= List of Malayalam films before 1960 =

This is a chronological list of original and dubbed Malayalam films released from the Malayalam language film industry's beginnings with Vigathakumaran (1928) through 1960.

== Released films ==
The following is a list of Malayalam films released from the beginning,

=== 1928 - 1949 ===
Movies	Year	Director	Story	Screenplay	Main actors
Vigathakumaran	1928	J. C. Daniel	J. C. Daniel	J. C. Daniel	J. C. Daniel, P. K. Rosy
Marthanda Varma	1933	P. V. Rao	C. V. Raman Pillai	P. V. Rao	Jaidev, A. V. P. Menon, Devaki, Padmini
Balan	1938	S. Nottani	Sundaram Pillai A	Muthukulam Raghavan Pillai	K. K. Aroor, Alleppey Vincent, M. K. Kamalam
Gnanambika	1940	S. Nottani	C. Madhavan Pillai	S. P. Pillai (debut)	K. K. Aroor, Alleppey Vincent, Sebastian Kunjukunju Bhagavathar
Prahlada	1941	K. Subramanyam	Mythology	N. P. Chellappan Nair	T. K. Balachandran, N. P. Chellappan Nair, Guru Gopinath, Thankamani Gopinath, Kumari Lakshmi
Nirmala	1948	P. V. Krishna Iyer	M. S. Jacob	Puthezhathu Raman Menon, Aranmula Ponnamma (debut)	Joseph Cherian, Baby Joseph
Vellinakshatram	1949	Felix J. Beyse	Kuttanad Ramakrishna Pillai		Miss Kumari, Alleppey Vincent, Gayaka Peethambaram, Ambujan, Kuttanadu Ramakrishna Pillai

=== 1950-1959 ===
No.	Movie	Date	Direction	Story	Screenplay	Main actors	Music
1	Nalla Thanka	14 January 1950	P. V. Krishna Iyer	Based on the legend of Nalla Thanka (Nalla Thankal in Tamil)	Muthukulam Raghavan Pillai	Augustine Joseph, Vaikom Mani, Miss Kumari, Miss Omana and S. P. Pillai	V. Dakshinamoorthy
2	Chechi	15 February 1950	T. Janaki Ram	N. P. Chellappan Nair	N. P. Chellappan Nair	Kottarakkara Sreedharan Nair Miss Kumari	G. K. Venkatesh
3	Sasidharan	13 April 1950	T. Janaki Ram	N. P. Chellappan Nair	N. P. Chellappan Nair	Nagavally R. S. Kurup, N. P. Chellappan Nair, Miss Kumari	P. Kalinga Rao
4	Sthree	21 April 1950	R. Velappan Nair	Thikkurissy Sukumaran Nair	Thikkurissy Sukumaran Nair (debut)	Thikkurissy Sukumaran Nair Vaikom M. P. Mani	B. A. Chidambaranath
5	Prasanna	17 August 1950	S. M. Sriramulu Naidu	Munshi Paramupillai	Munshi Paramupillai	Pappukutty Bhagavathar, Kottarakkara Sreedharan Nair, P. A. Thomas, (Lalitha, Padmini, Ragini -Travancore sisters; debut)	M. S. Gnanamani
6	Chandrika	24 August 1950	V. S. Raghavan	N. P. Chellappan Nair	Nagavally R. S. Kurup	Thikkurissy Sukumaran Nair, Nagavally R. S. Kurup	V. Dakshinamoorthy, G. Govindarajulu Naidu
7	Jeevitha Nouka	15 March 1951	K. Vembu	Muthukulam Raghavan Pillai	Muthukulam Raghavan Pillai	Thikkurissy Sukumaran Nair, B. S. Saroja, Sebastian Kunju Kunju Bhagavatar	V. Dakshinamoorthy
8	Navalokam	29 March 1951	V Krishnan	Ponkunnam Varkey	Ponkunnam Varkey	Thikkurissy Sukumaran Nair	V. Dakshinamoorthy
9	Kerala Kesari	17 May 1951	V. Krishnan	V. K. Kumar	N. Sankara Pillai	Kalaikkal Kumaran, K. K. Aroor, Durga Varma	Jnanamani
10	Rakthabandham	18 May 1951	M. R. Vittal	K. Chellappan Pillai	K. Chellappan Pillai	Kalaikkal Kumaran, T. R. Omana, Paravoor Bharathan (debut)	S. M. Subbaiah Naidu and S. N. Ranganathan
11	Vanamala	9 June 1951	G. Vishwanathan	G. Viswanath	G. Viswanath	P. A. Thomas, Ammini	P. S. Divakar
12	Yachakan	12 September 1951	R. Velappan Nair	Dr. P. S. Nair	Dr. P. S. Nair	M. P. Manmathan, Miss Kumari, Kottarakkara, S. P. Pillai	S. N. Ranganathan
13	Suhruthu	16 January 1952	Joseph Pallipad	Joseph Pallipad	Joseph Pallipad	M. S. Namboothiri, Alex Parakkal	G. Viswanath
14	Alphonsa	5 February 1952	O. J. Thottan	O. J. Thottan	O. J. Thottan	Jose Prakash, Miss Kumari	T. R. Pappa
15	Aathmasanthi	21 March 1952	Joseph Thaliyath	N. P. Chellappan Nair	N. P. Chellappan Nair	T. K. Madhavan Nair, Miss Kumari	T. R. Pappa
16	Kanchana	1 May 1952	S. M. Sriramulu Naidu	Lakshmi	Munshi Paramu Pillai	K. R. Ramasamy, Lalitha, Padmini, Miss Kumari, M. N. Nambiar	S. M. Subbaiah Naidu
17	Marumakal	9 May 1952	S. K. Chari	M. P. Productions	Kedamangalam Sadanandan	Prem Nazir (debut), Neyyatinkara Komalam	P. S. Divakar
18	Premalekha	25 July 1952	M. K. Ramani	Vanakutty Raman Pillai	Vanakutty Raman Pillai	Jose Prakash, S. P. Pillai	P. S. Divakar
19	Aathmasakhi	17 August 1952	G. R. Rao	KP Kottarakkara	KP Kottarakkara	Sathyan (debut), B. S. Saroja	Br Lakshmanan
20	Visappinte Vili	22 August 1952	Mohan Rao	Muthukulam Raghavan Pillai	Muthukulam Raghavan Pillai	Prem Nazir, Kumari Thankam, Thikkurissy Sukumaran Nair	P. S. Divakar
21	Amma	24 December 1952	K. Vembu	Nagavally R. S. Kurup		Thikkurissy Sukumaran Nair, Lalitha, B. S. Saroja	V. Dakshinamurthy
22	Achan	24 December 1952	M. R. S. Mani	Thikkurissy Sukumaran Nair	Thikkurissy Sukumaran Nair	Prem Nazir, B. S. Saroja, Thikkurissy Sukumaran Nair	P. S. Divakar
23	Velakkaran	12 February 1953	E. R. Kooper	Muthukulam Raghavan Pillai	Muthukulam Raghavan Pillai	Thikkurissy Sukumaran Nair, P. K. Saraswathi	V. Dakshinamurthy
24	Thiramala	17 April 1953	Vimal Kumar, P. R. S. Pillai	T. N. Gopinathan Nair	T. N. Gopinathan Nair	Sathyan, Kumari Thankam, Thomas Burleigh	Vimal Kumar
25	Genova	17 April 1953	F. Nagoor	Swami Brahmavrathan	Swami Brahmavrathan	M. G. Ramachandran, B. S. Saroja	T. A. Kalyanam, M. S. Gnanamani and M. S. Viswanathan
26	Lokaneethi	17 April 1953	R. Velappan Nair	Muthukulam Raghavan Pilla	Muthukulam Raghavan Pilla	Sathyan, B. S. Saroja	V. Dakshinamurthy
27	Sheriyo Thetto	5 September 1953	Thikkurissy Sukumaran Nair, V. A. Reynolds	Thikkurissy Sukumaran Nair	Thikkurissy Sukumaran Nair	Jose Prakash (debut), Thikkurissy Sukumaran Nair	V. Dakshinamurthy
28	Ashadeepam	18 September 1953	G. R. Rao	Ponkunnam Varkey	Ponkunnam Varkey	Sathyan, B. S. Saroja	V. Dakshinamurthy
29	Ponkathir	14 October 1953	E. R. Kooper	K.P. Kottarakkara, Muthukulam Raghavan Pillai	K.P. Kottarakkara, Muthukulam Raghavan Pillai	Prem Nazir, Lalitha	Br Lakshmanan
30	Avakasi	16 March 1954	Antony Mitradas	K. .P Kottarakkara	K. .P Kottarakkara	Prem Nazir, Miss Kumari, S. P. Pillai, Bahadoor (debut)	Br Lakshmanan
31	Sandehi	7 August 1954	F. Nagoor	F. Nagoor	N. N. Pisharady	Muthukulam Raghavan Pillai, T. R. Omana	T. R. Pappa
32	Manasakshi	20 August 1954	G. Vishwanath	P. S. Nair	P. S. Nair	Prem Nazir, Miss Kumari	S. G. K. Pillai
33	Puthradharmam	9 September 1954	Vimal Kumar	Film Company	Thikkurissy Sukumaran Nair	Thikkurissy Sukumaran Nair, Lakshmi Bai	P. S. Divakar
34	Avan Varunnu	18 September 1954	M. R. S. Mani	M. Kunchacko	Muthukulam Raghavan Pilla	Prem Nazir, Miss Kumari, Kumari Thankam	V. Dakshinamurthy
35	Neelakuyil	10 October 1954	Ramu Kariat, P. Bhaskaran	Uroob	Uroob, P. Bhaskaran	Sathyan, Miss Kumari, P. Bhaskaran	Lyrics: P. Bhaskaran, Music: K. Raghavan
36	Balyasakhi	23 December 1954	Antony Mitradas	K.P. Kottarakkara	K.P. Kottarakkara	Prem Nazir, Miss Kumari, Kumari Thankam	Br Lakshmanan
37	Snehaseema	30 December 1954	S. S. Rajan	Ponkunnam Varkey (Snehaseema)	Ponkunnam Varkey	Sathyan, Padmini, Kottarakkara Sridharan Nair, G. K. Pillai (debut)	V. Dakshinamurthy
38	Aniyathi	11 February 1955	M. Krishnan Nair	T. N. Gopinathan Nair	T. N. Gopinathan Nair	Prem Nazir, Miss Kumari, T. K. Balachandran	Br Lakshmanan
39	Kidappadam	11 February 1955	M. R. S. Mani	M. Kunchacko	Muthukulam Raghavan Pilla	Prem Nazir, Kumari Thankam	V. Dakshinamurthy
40	Harishchandra	19 March 1955	Antony Mitradas	Satyanath		Thikkurissy Sukumaran Nair, Miss Kumari	Br Lakshmanan
41	Kalam Marunnu	21 April 1955	R. Velappan Nair	Kailas Pictures	R. Velappan Nair	Sathyan, K. P. A. C. Sulochana	G. Devarajan, Br Lakshmanan
42	Newspaper Boy	13 May 1955	P. Ramdas	P. Ramdas	P. Ramdas	Master Moni, Nagavally R. S. Kurup, Veeran, T. R. Omana, Adoor Pankajam, Miss Kumari	Vijayan, A. Ramachandran
43	C.I.D.	27 August 1955	M. Krishnan Nair	T. N. Gopinathan Nair	T. N. Gopinathan Nair	Prem Nazir, Miss Kumari, Kumari Thankam	Br Lakshmanan
44	Rarichan Enna Pauran	10 February 1956	P. Bhaskaran	Uroob	Uroob	K.P. Ummer (debut), Vilasini (old), Prema Menon, Master Latheef, Kalamandalam Kalyanikutty Amma	K. Raghavan
45	Aathmaarpanam	23 March 1956	G. R. Rao	K. P. Kottarakkara	K. P. Kottarakkara	Prem Nazir, B. S. Saroja, Thikkurissy Sukumaran Nair	V. Dakshinamurthy
46	Manthravadi	18 August 1956	P. Subramanian	Nagavally R. S. Kurup	Nagavally R. S. Kurup	Prem Nazir, Kumari Thankam, Miss Kumari, Kottarakkara Sridharan Nair, Bahadoor, Jose Prakash	Br Lakshmanan
47	Koodappirappu	19 October 1956	J. D. Thottan	Muthukulam Raghavan Pillai	Ponjikkara Rafi	Prem Navas, T. S. Muthaiah, Muthukulam Raghavan Pillai, Ambika, Miss Kumari, Kumari Thankam, Adoor Pankajam	K. Raghavan
48	Avar Unarunnu	16 November 1956	N. Sankaran Nair	Muthukulam Raghavan Pillai	Muthukulam Raghavan Pillai	Prem Nazir, Sathyan, Miss Kumari	V. Dakshinamurthy
49	Padatha Painkili	22 March 1957	P. Subramaniam	Muttathu Varkey (Padatha Painkili)	Muttathu Varkey	Prem Nazir, Miss Kumari, K. V. Shanthi	Br Lakshmanan
50	Achanum Makanum	26 April 1957	Vimal Kumar	Jagathy N. K. Achary	Jagathy N. K. Achary	Prem Nazir, Kumari Thankam, Jagathy Sreekumar (debut)	Vimal Kumar
51	Minnaminugu	24 May 1957	Ramu Kariat	Ramu Kariat, Ponjikkara Rafi	Ponjikkara Rafi	Premji, Manavalan Joseph	M. S. Baburaj
52	Minnunnathellam Ponnalla	17 August 1957	R. Velappan Nair	K. P. Kottarakkara	K. P. Kottarakkara	Sathyan, Kumari Thankam	S. N. Ranganathan
53	Jailppulli	30 October 1957	P. Subramaniam	Muttathu Varkey	Muttathu Varkey	Prem Nazir, Miss Kumari, K. V. Shanthi	Br Lakshmanan
54	Thaskaraveeran	29 November 1957	S. M. Sriramulu Naidu	T. Ramalingam Pillai		Sathyan, Ragini, Sukumari (debut), Kottarakkara Sridharan Nair	C. Ramchandra, S. M. Subbaiah Naidu
55	Deva Sundari	25 December 1957	M. K. R. Nambiar	Sreemathi Munnas		Prem Nazir, Sathyan, Kumari Thankam	T. R. Pappa
56	Nairu Pidicha Pulivalu	14 February 1958	P. Bhaskaran	Uroob (Business)	Uroob	Sathyan, Ragini, S. P. Pillai, Bahadoor (first comedy movie in Malayalam)	K. Raghavan
57	Mariakutty	15 March 1958	P. Subramaniam	Muttathu Varkey	Muttathu Varkey	Prem Nazir, Miss Kumari, Kushalakumari	Br Lakshmanan
58	Randidangazhi	24 August 1958	P. Subramaniam	Thakazhi Sivasankara Pillai (Randidangazhi)	Thakazhi Sivasankara Pillai	P. J. Antony (debut), T. S. Muthaiah, Miss Kumari	Br Lakshmanan
59	Lilly	25 December 1958	F. Nagoor	Jimmy		Prem Nazir, K. V. Shanthi, Kumari Thankam, B. S. Saroja	Viswanathan–Ramamoorthy
60	Aana Valarthiya Vanampadi	18 February 1959	P. Subramaniam	Neela	Thikkurissy Sukumaran Nair	Bahadoor, Miss Kumari (double role), Thikkurissy Sukumaran Nair	Br Lakshmanan
61	Minnalppadayaali	25 April 1959	G. Viswanath	Muthukulam Raghavan Pilla	Muthukulam Raghavan Pilla	Sathyan, Padmini	P. S. Divakar, Ranganathan
62	Chathurangam	10 September 1959	J. D. Thottan	J. D. Thottan, Joshwa	Muthukulam Raghavan Pilla	Prem Nazir, Padmini	G. Devarajan
63	Naadodikal	11 September 1959	S. Ramanathan	S. Ramanathan	S. Ramanathan	Prem Navaz, Ambika Sukumaran	
