= Minnunnathellam Ponnalla =

- Poster
- Directed by: R. Velappan Nair
- Screenplay by: K. P. Kottarakkara
- Produced by: P. K. Sathyapal
- Starring: Sathyan; P. K. Sathyapal; Kumari Thankam
- Cinematography: P. Balasubramaniam
- Music by: S. N. Ranganathan
- Production company: Kerala Arts
- Release date: 17 August 1957
- Country: India
- Language: Malayalam

Minnunnathellam Ponnalla (transl. All that glitters is not gold) is a 1957 Indian Malayalam-language crime thriller film directed by R. Velappan Nair. It is a remake of the 1956 Hindi film CID and stars Sathyan, P. K. Sathyapal and Kumari Thankam. The song "Irul Moodukayo" from the film was singer S. Janaki's debut in Malayalam cinema.

== Cast ==
- Sathyan as Rajan
- P. K. Sathyapal as Dharmapalan
- G. K. Pillai as Judge
- K. P. Kottarakkara as newspaper editor
- Jose Prakash as Prosecutor
- T. S. Muthaiah as Pachan
- S. P. Pillai as Head Constable
- Anil Kumar as Vijayan
- Miss Kumari
- P. N. Menon as old man
- Mohanraj as Police Inspector
- Kozhikode Narayanan Nair as Nanu
- Santo Krishnan as Santo
- Pappi as Pappi
- Keshavan as Keshavan
- Kumari Thankam as Malathi
- K. V. Shanthi as Leela
- Adoor Pankajam as Kalyani
