= T. N. Gopinathan Nair =

Indian author

- Born: 24 April 1918; Thiruvananthapuram, Kerala, India
- Died: 24 May 1999 (aged 81); Kerala
- Education: Holy Angel's Convent Thiruvananthapuram; Government Model Boys Higher Secondary School; Government Arts College, Thiruvananthapuram
- Occupations: Playwright; novelist; poet; screenwriter
- Notable work: Vidhiyo Vidhi; Akavum Ouravum; Janadrohi; Ente Mini
- Spouse: Saudamini
- Children: 3
- Parent(s): P. K. Narayana Pillai; Parukutty Amma
- Awards: 1979 Kerala Sahitya Akademi Award for Drama

T. N. Gopinathan Nair (24 April 1918 – 24 May 1999), was an Indian dramatist, novelist, poet, screenwriter and biographer of Malayalam language. One of the prolific Malayalam playwrights, Nair published 39 plays, besides four novels, four poetry anthologies and five biographies. He was a member of the council of Kerala Sahitya Akademi and held the char of the Kerala Sangeetha Nataka Akademi. His drama, Pareeksha, received the Vikraman Nair Trophy for the best drama and the Kerala Sahitya Akademi selected his work, Sakshi, for their annual award for drama in 1979.

== Early life and education ==
Gopinathan Nair was born on 24 April 1918 in Thiruvananthapuram, in the south Indian state of Kerala to "Sahityapanchanan" P. K. Narayana Pillai, a noted scholar and lawyer and his wife, Parukutty Amma. His primary education was at Holy Angel's Convent Thiruvananthapuram and after passing 4th standard, he continued his schooling at the Government Model Boys High School before graduating from the Government Arts College, Thiruvananthapuram, then known as Maharaja's College of Arts. Subsequently, he studied law but abandoned the studies after failing in the first year examination and joined Malayalarajyam daily as a special correspondent.

== Work ==
Later, after working as a correspondent, he also served as the editor of Malayalarajyam film magazine for a year before founding P. K. Memorial Press, named after his father, from where he published a magazine under the name, Sakhi and a daily by name, Veerakesari. He also started a book stall but all his ventures failed resulting in heavy financial losses. It was to repay the debts, Nair turned to films and he made his debut with Thiramala, a 1953 film, for which wrote the story, screenplay and dialogues; he also acted in the film along with Sathyan and Kumari Thankam. He was associated with many more films including the 1958 film, Nairu Pidicha Pulivalu. The same year, he joined the Thiruvananthapuram station of the All India Radio (AIR) as a director of plays and he served AIR until his superannuation from service in 1975. Later, he served as a consultant to Manorajyam weekly, Akashvani and Doordarshan.

Gopinathan Nair's oeuvre comprises over 50 books, falling into genres such as plays, novels, poetry, biography and travelogues, which include Ente Mini, an elegiacal reminiscences on the death of his wife. Besides, he wrote screenplay for five films, of which three, Thiramala, Aniyathi and Pareeksha, were based on his own stories and he acted in 8 films. Pareeksha, one of his plays, received the Vikraman Nair Trophy best drama. He received the Kerala Sahitya Akademi Award for Drama for his play, Sakshi, in 1979.

== Personal life ==
Gopinathan Nair was married to Saudamini, fondly called Mini, the daughter of noted writer, Kuttippurath Kesavan Nair; the marriage taking place in 1950. The couple had two sons and a daughter. The eldest of the children, Ravi Vallathol, was a noted film and television actor. Saudamini predeceased Nair in 1973, and it was in her memory that he later wrote a book named Ente Mini. Nair died on 24 May 1999, at the age of 81.

== Selected bibliography ==
=== Plays ===
- Gopinathan Nair, T. N. (1955). Parivarthanam. Kottayam: Sahitya Pravarthaka Co-operative Society.
- Gopinathan Nair, T. N. (1957). Pookkaari. Kottayam: Sahitya Pravarthaka Co-operative Society.
- Gopinathan Nair, T. N. (1959). Nizhalkoothu. Kottayam: Sahitya Pravarthaka Co-operative Society.
- Gopinathan Nair, T. N. (1955). Akavum puravum. Kottayam: Sahitya Pravarthaka Co-operative Society.
- Gopinathan Nair, T. N. (1955). Aval oru pennaanu. Kottayam: Sahitya Pravarthaka Co-operative Society.
- Gopinathan Nair, T. N. (1962). Manam thelinju. S.P.C.S.
- T. N., Gopinathan Nair (1964). Veettile vellicham. Thrissur: Current Books.
- Gopinathan Nair, T. N. (1968). T. N. Gopinathan Nayarute natakangal. Kottayam: Sahitya Pravarthaka Co-operative Society.
- Gopinathan Nair, T. N. (1971). Ezhu nirangal. Kottayam: Sahitya Pravarthaka Co-operative Society.
- Gopinathan Nair, T. N. (1973). Nizhalukal akalunuu. Kottayam: Sahitya Pravarthaka Co-operative Society.
- Gopinathan Nair, T. N. (1974). Pazhamayum puthumayum. Lakshmanan Pillai.
- Gopinathan Nair, T. N. (1974). Mister gulugulu. Kottayam: Sahitya Pravarthaka Co-operative Society.
- Gopinathan Nair, T. N. (1976). Sakshi. Thrissur: DC Books.
- Gopinathan Nair, T. N. (1976). Anganeyengil angane. Kottayam: Sahitya Pravarthaka Co-operative Society.
- Gopinathan Nair, T. N. (1978). Dasapushpam. Kottayam: S.P.C.S.
- Gopinathan Nair, T. N. (1981). Pareeksha. Thrissur: Kerala Sahithya Academy.
- Gopinathan Nair, T. N. (1982). Grahanavum Onavum. Kottayam: Sahithya Pravarthaka Co-operative Society.
- Gopinathan Nair, T. N. (1984). Manthriyum mattum. Kottayam: Sahitya Pravarthaka Co-operative Society.
- Gopinathan Nair, T. N. (1990). Kayangal. Kozhikode: Poorna Publications.
- Gopinathan Nair, T. N. Samam samam.
- Gopinathan Nair, T. N. Pinthirippan prasthanam.
- Gopinathan Nair, T. N. Prathidhvani.
- Gopinathan Nair, T. N. (1997). Edavela. Kottayam: Sahitya Pravarthaka Co-operative Society.
- Gopinathan Nair, T. N. Nadakangal. Kottayam: Sahitya Pravarthaka Co-operative Society.
- Gopinathan Nair, T. N. Ammaveedu. Ernakulam: Sahitya Parishad.

=== One act plays ===
- Gopinathan Nair, T. N. Anachadanam. Punalur: Udaya.
- Gopinathan Nair, T. N. (1953). Swapna mekhala.
- Gopinathan Nair, T. N. (1957). Ghadikaram neengunnu. Gopinathan NairT.N.
- Gopinathan Nair, T. N. (1963). Pinnekkanam. Quilon: MS Book Depot.
- Gopinathan Nair, T. N. (1969). Ahithi (translation). S.P.C.S.

=== Novels ===
- Gopinathan Nair. T. N (1945). Sudha. Trivandrum: Reddiar Press & Book depot.
- Gopinathan Nair, T. N. (1989). Vaitharani. Kozhikode: Poorna.
- T. N., Gopinathan Nair (1958). Maleyute maala. Ernakulam: S P C S Ltd.
- T. N., Gopinathan Nair. Vaitharani. Kozhikode: Poorna Publications.

=== Poetry ===
- Gopinathan Nair, T. N. (1938). Kalithoni. S.P.C.S.
- Gopinathan Nair, T. N. (1987). T N nte kavithakal.
- Gopinathan Nair, T. N. Thilakam. Trivandrum: S. R. Press.

=== Memoirs ===
- Gopinathan Nair, T. N. (1980). Ente diary (smaranakal).
- Gopinathan Nair, T. N. (1981). Ente Mini (smarana).
- Gopinathan Nair, T. N. (1996). Ente album. Kottayam: DCB.

=== Biography ===
- Gopinathan Nair, T. N. (1983). Col. Godavarma Raja. Kottayam: Gopinathan Nair T.N.
- Gopinathan Nair, T. N. (1992). Avasaanathe naduvazhiyude amma.
- Gopinathan Nair, T. N; Author (1999). Sree Chithirathirunal: avasaanathe naaduvaazhi (2nd ed.). Thiruvananthapuram, Department of cultural publications Ke. ISBN 9788186365502.

=== Travelogue ===
- Gopinathan Nair, T. N. (1984). Theerthayaathra.
- Gopinathan Nair, T. N. (1986). Punya sankethangal.

=== Others ===
- Gopinathan Nair, T. N. (1995). Kudumba vijnanakosam. Trivandrum: Centre for Non- Conventional Education.
- Gopinathan Nair, T. N. (1999). Panchamritham. Aksharakairali. Thiruvananthapuram: Kerala State Institute of Children's Literature.

=== Screenplay ===
- T. N., Gopinathan Nair (1969). Sreevazhum ammaveedu. Thrissur: Current Books.

== Filmography ==
=== As an actor ===
- Thiramala (1953)
- Ashadeepam (1953)
- Padatha Painkili (1957)
- Nairu Pidicha Pulivalu (1958)
- Manavatti (1964)
- Aana (1983)
- Vembanaad (1990)
- Gouri (1992)

=== As a writer ===
- Thiramala (1953)
- C.I.D. (1955)
- Aniyathi (1955)
- Christmas Rathri
- Pareeksha (1967)

== See also ==
- List of Malayalam-language authors by category
- List of Malayalam-language authors
