= Alphonsa =

Alphonsa may refer to:

== People ==
- Alphonsa of the Immaculate Conception, Catholic saint
- Alphonsa, Indian film actress

== Institutions ==
- Alphonsa College, Thiruvambady
- Alphonsa Matriculation Higher Secondary School, Nagercoil

== Other uses ==
- Alphonsa, 1952 Indian film
- St. Alphonsa Church, Bharanganam
