= Lilly (1958 film) =

- Poster
- Directed by: F. Nagoor
- Written by: Jimmy
- Produced by: H. T. Pictures
- Starring: Prem Nazir; B. S. Saroja
- Cinematography: Vasudev Karnataki
- Edited by: A. Appu
- Music by: Viswanathan–Ramamoorthy
- Production company: Manneth Pictures
- Release date: 25 December 1958
- Country: India
- Language: Malayalam

Lilly is a 1958 Indian Malayalam-language film, directed by F. Nagoor and produced by Manneth David. The film stars Prem Nazir and Kumari Thankam. The film had musical score by Viswanathan–Ramamoorthy.

== Cast ==
- Prem Nazir
- B. S. Saroja
- Sathyan
- Bahadoor
- Kumari Thankam
- S. P. Pillai
- T. S. Muthaiah
- Muthukulam Raghavan Pillai
- K. V. Shanthi
- Susheela
