= C.I.D. In Jungle =

- Directed by: G. P. Kammath
- Written by: Muthukulam Raghavan Pillai
- Screenplay by: Muthukulam Raghavan Pillai
- Produced by: G. P. Kammath
- Starring: Sathyan; T. S. Muthaiah; Abbas; Devika
- Music by: Bhagyanath
- Production company: G. P. Kammath
- Distributed by: G. P. Kammath
- Release date: 22 January 1971
- Country: India
- Language: Malayalam

C.I.D. In Jungle is a 1971 Indian Malayalam film, directed and produced by G. P. Kammath. The film stars Sathyan, T. S. Muthaiah, Abbas and Devika in the lead roles. The film has a musical score by Bhagyanath.

== Cast ==
- Sathyan
- T. S. Muthaiah
- Abbas
- Devika
- Madhumathi
- S. P. Pillai
- K. V. Shanthi

== Soundtrack ==
The music was composed by Bhagyanath and the lyrics were written by Kedamangalam Sadanandan.

No.	Song	Singers	Lyrics	Length (m:ss)
1	"Durge Vanadurge"	Chorus, C. O. Anto	Kedamangalam Sadanandan	
2	"Poovallikkudilil"	L. R. Eeswari, Renuka	Kedamangalam Sadanandan	
3	"Thennale Thennale Poonthennale"	K. J. Yesudas, S. Janaki	Kedamangalam Sadanandan	
4	"Vandathaane"	L. R. Eeswari	Kedamangalam Sadanandan	
