= Pengal =

- Directed by: A. K. Sahadevan
- Written by: M. K. Sahadevan; Varghese Tholathu (dialogues)
- Screenplay by: M. K. Sahadevan
- Starring: Sathyan; T. S. Muthaiah; Kottayam Chellappan; MS Namboothiri
- Cinematography: P. K. Madhavan Nair
- Edited by: K. D. George
- Music by: K. V. Job; George
- Production company: Renowned Films
- Distributed by: Renowned Films
- Release date: 25 October 1968
- Country: India
- Language: Malayalam

Pengal is a 1968 Indian Malayalam-language film, directed by A. K. Sahadevan. The film stars Sathyan, T. S. Muthaiah, Kottayam Chellappan and M. S. Namboothiri. The film had musical score by K. V. Job and George.

== Cast ==
- Sathyan
- T. S. Muthaiah
- Kottayam Chellappan
- M. S. Namboothiri
- Madhumathi
- S. P. Pillai

== Soundtrack ==
The music was composed by K. V. Job and George with lyrics by T. P. Sukumaran and Santhakumar.

No.	Song	Singers	Lyrics	Length (m:ss)
1	"Kaarmukilolivarnna"	P. Leela	T. P. Sukumaran, Santhakumar	
2	"Kannupotthikkalikkunna"	K. J. Yesudas, L. R. Eeswari	T. P. Sukumaran, Santhakumar	
3	"Raararo Raariraro"	S. Janaki	T. P. Sukumaran, Santhakumar	
4	"Thedukayaanellaarum"	C. O. Anto	T. P. Sukumaran, Santhakumar	
5	"Vyaamoham"	K. J. Yesudas	T. P. Sukumaran, Santhakumar	
