= Vaikom Saraswathi =

South-Indian Carnatic singer and Playback Singer

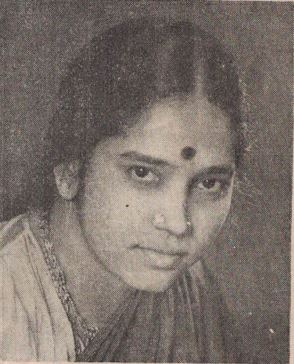
- Born: Vaikom, India
- Occupation: Carnatic vocalist
- Known for: Carnatic singer, Playback singer
- Relatives: Rajan (Brother, Malayalam Playback singer)

Vaikom Saraswathi was a South-Indian Carnatic singer and a Playback singer Her Carnatic songs have been published in gramophone records.

== Radio concerts ==
Her Carnatic music concerts have been broadcast over All India Radio stations.

== Playback singer ==
Though playback singing was introduced to Tamil films in 1938 (Nandakumar), it became popular after Sri Valli (1945). K. V. Mahadevan introduced Vaikom Saraswathi as playback singer in the 1947 film Dhana Amaravathi. She sang 3 songs - Kandenadi, Un Thiruvarul and Azhagai - for B. S. Saroja. She also sang 2 songs - Vaarum Indha Verlai and Saedhi Enna - for the 1948 film Jambam.

== Sibling ==
Vaikkom Saraswathi's brother, Rajan was also a playback singer. The song Swantham viyarpinaal.. sung by Rajan for the 1951 film Yachakan became popular. Soon after the recording for this film, Rajan died due to illness.
