= Ballatha Pahayan =

- Directed by: T. S. Muthaiah
- Written by: M. M. Ebrahimkutty; S. L. Puram Sadanandan (dialogues)
- Screenplay by: S. H. Gopalakrishnan
- Produced by: T. S. Muthaiah
- Starring: Prem Nazir; Jayabharathi; Thikkurissy Sukumaran Nair; Manavalan Joseph
- Cinematography: E. N. Balakrishnan
- Edited by: M. Umanath
- Music by: K. V. Job
- Production company: Sree Movies
- Distributed by: Sree Movies
- Release date: 27 February 1969
- Country: India
- Language: Malayalam

Ballatha Pahayan is a 1969 Indian Malayalam-language film, directed and produced by T. S. Muthaiah. The film stars Prem Nazir, Jayabharathi, Thikkurissy Sukumaran Nair and Manavalan Joseph. The film had musical score by K. V. Job.

== Cast ==
- Prem Nazir as Subair
- Jayabharathi as Salma
- Thikkurissy Sukumaran Nair as Hajiyaar
- Manavalan Joseph as Porinchu
- Sankaradi as Kaaranavar
- Changanasseri Chinnamma
- Abhayam
- Baby Indira as Sulekha
- Bahadoor as Aliyaar
- C. R. Lakshmi
- K. P. Ummer as Rajan
- Masood
- Master Sridhar
- Meena as Mymoon
- Paravoor Bharathan as Adraan
- S. P. Pillai as Pillai
- Sakunthala
- T. K. Balachandran as Chandran
- Usharani

== Soundtrack ==
The music was composed by K. V. Job and the lyrics were written by Sreekumaran Thampi.

No.	Song	Singers	Lyrics	Length (m:ss)
1	"Alathallum Kaattinte" (Mottaayum Poovaayum)	S. Janaki	Sreekumaran Thampi	
2	"Aliyaaru Kaakka"	Malini, Zero Babu	Sreekumaran Thampi	
3	"Bhoomiyilthanne Swargam"	L. R. Eeswari, Chorus	Sreekumaran Thampi	
4	"Kadalalarunnu"	K. J. Yesudas	Sreekumaran Thampi]	
5	"Manassinte Kithaabile"	K. J. Yesudas, S. Janaki	Sreekumaran Thampi	
6	"Snehathil Vidarunna"	P. Susheela, A. M. Rajah	Sreekumaran Thampi	
7	"Swargapputhumaran"	P. Leela, L. R. Eeswari, Chorus	Sreekumaran Thampi	
8	"Thirty Days in September"	P. Leela, Chorus, Malini	Sreekumaran Thampi	
9	"Veshathinu Reshanaayi"	C. O. Anto	Sreekumaran Thampi	
