= Devaalayam =

Malayalam film

- Directed by: N. S. Muthukumaran; Ramanathan
- Written by: M. A. Abbas; Kedamangalam Sadanandan (dialogues)
- Screenplay by: Kedamangalam Sadanandan
- Starring: Prem Nazir; Adoor Bhasi; Thikkurissy Sukumaran Nair; Kedamangalam Sadanandan
- Cinematography: P. K. Madhavan Nair
- Edited by: G. Veluswami; Shaly
- Music by: V. Dakshinamoorthy
- Production company: Manneth Films
- Distributed by: Manneth Films
- Release date: 20 March 1964
- Country: India
- Language: Malayalam

Devaalayam is a 1964 Indian Malayalam-language film, directed N. S. Muthukumaran and Ramanathan. The film was produced by Manneth David. It stars Prem Nazir, Adoor Bhasi, Thikkurissy Sukumaran Nair and Kedamangalam Sadanandan and features a musical score by V. Dakshinamoorthy.

== Cast ==
- Prem Nazir
- Adoor Bhasi
- Thikkurissy Sukumaran Nair
- Kedamangalam Sadanandan
- T. R. Omana
- T. S. Muthaiah
- Ambika
- J. A. R. Anand
- Kottarakkara Sreedharan Nair
- Mavelikkara Ponnamma
- Padmini
- S. P. Pillai
- Santha Devi

== Soundtrack ==
Music for Devaalayam was composed by V Dakshinamiollothy and Abhayadev penned the lyris

No.	Song	Singers	Lyrics	Length (m:ss)
1	"Aaraanullil"	P. Leela	Abhayadev	
2	"Kaithozhaam"	K. J. Yesudas	Abhayadev	
3	"Kannilppettathu"	P. B. Sreenivas	Abhayadev	
4	"Maanathu Kaaru Kandu"	P. Leela	Abhayadev	
5	"Naagaraadi Ennayundu"	V. Dakshinamoorthy	Abhayadev	
6	"Neela Viriyitta"	P. Leela	Abhayadev	
7	"Njaninnale"	K. J. Yesudas, P. Leela	Abhayadev	
8	"Odippokum"	P. Leela	Abhayadev	
9	"Poo Poocha Poochetti"	Latha Raju	Abhayadev	
