= Manthravadi =

- Directed by: P Subramaniam
- Written by: Nagavally R. S. Kurup
- Produced by: P Subramaniam
- Starring: Prem Nazir; Kumari Thankam
- Music by: Brother Laxmanan
- Production company: Neela
- Distributed by: Kumaraswamy & Co
- Release date: 18 August 1956
- Country: India
- Language: Malayalam

Mathravadi is a 1956 Indian Malayalam-language fantasy film, directed and produced by P Subramaniam. The film stars Prem Nazir, Kumari Thankam in lead roles. The film had music composed by Brother Laxmanan and lyrics by Thirunainarkurichy Madhavan Nair. The film was remade in Tamil under the same name.

== Cast ==
- Prem Nazir as Priyan
- Adoor Pankajam as Mayavathi
- Kottarakkara Sreedharan Nair as Mahedran
- Aranmula Ponnamma as Susheeladevi
- Bahadoor as Vibhinan
- Kumari Thankam as Kalyani
- S. P. Pillai as Mayadasan
- T. S. Muthaiah as Sugunan, Vinayan (double role), servant of Priya Kumaran
- G. K. Pillai as Kalyani's father
- Miss Kumari as Mallika
- Mavelikkara Ponnamma as Kanthimathi
- Jose Prakash as Veeravarman, father of Mallika
- Kottayam Shantha as Vasanthy
- Hari as Young Priyan
- Muttathara Soman as Mayavi
- Thiruvananthapuram Lalitha as Nalini
