= Antony Mitradas =

Indian film director (1913–2017)

- Born: 3 November 1913; Madurai, British India
- Died: February 20, 2017 (aged 103); Chennai, Tamil Nadu
- Occupation: director

Antony Mitradas (3 November 1913 – 20 February 2017) was an Indian film director who directed films in three languages: Tamil, Malayalam and Sinhalese.

== Early life ==
Mitradas was born in Madurai on 3 November 1913. He did his B.A. Statistics at American College, Madurai. His passion for film direction took him to Calcutta, and he enrolled in an institute run by Mr. Balchandani. There the noted director Ellis R. Dungan had come to deliver a guest lecture. Dungan was much impressed by Mitradas and recommended him to T. R. Sundaram of Modern Theatres, Salem. Thus he got the opportunity to direct his first film Dayalan starring P. U. Chinnappa in 1941, as soon as he finished his studies at the film institute.

== Career ==
Mitradas' best known films are Baalyasakhi, Avakasi and Pizhaikkum Vazhi. Avakasi was a turning point in the career of Prem Nazir. Duppathage Duka (1956) is the remake of the Tamil hit Ezhai Padum Padu. With the outbreak of the World War II, he felt the necessity to serve the nation. He joined the army and was posted in Singapore and Chittagong during 1942-1945. At the end of the war, he restarted his film career and directed a few films.

== Death ==
He died at the age of 103 on 20 February 2017 at Chennai.

== Filmography ==
S. No	Film name	Language	Year	Actors
1.	Dayalan	Tamil	1941	P.U. Chinnappa, T.R. Mahalingam, K.V. Jayagouri
2.	Pizhaikkum Vazhi	Tamil	1948	T. S. Durairaj, T. A. Jayalakshmi, T. S. Balaiah
3.	Baalyasakhi	Malayalam	1954	Prem Nazir, Kumari Thankam, Miss Kumari
4.	Avakasi	Malayalam	1954	Prem Nazir, Miss Kumari
5.	Harishchandra	Malayalam	1955	Thikkurisi Sukumaran Nair
6.	Duppathage Duka	Sinhalese	1956	Laddy Ranasinghe, Gerly Gunawardana
7.	Sivagami	Tamil	1960	M.K. Thyagaraja Bhagavathar, Devika

== See also ==
- List of Sri Lankan films of the 1950s for details of Duppathage Duka
