= Sabarimala Sree Dharmashastha =

- Directed by: M. Krishnan Nair
- Written by: Mythology; Kedamangalam Sadanandan (dialogues)
- Screenplay by: Kedamangalam Sadanandan
- Produced by: C. R. K. Nair
- Starring: Thikkurissy Sukumaran Nair; Hari; Manavalan Joseph; Sridevi
- Cinematography: Shailan Bose
- Music by: V. Dakshinamoorthy; Jaya Vijaya
- Production company: Sastha Films
- Distributed by: Sastha Films
- Release date: 11 December 1970
- Country: India
- Language: Malayalam

Sabarimala Sree Dharmashastha is a 1970 Indian Malayalam-language Hindu mythological drama film, directed by M. Krishnan Nair and produced by C. R. K. Nair. The film stars Thikkurissy Sukumaran Nair, Hari, Manavalan Joseph, and Sridevi. The film's music was composed by V. Dakshinamoorthy and Jaya Vijaya.

== Cast ==
- Thikkurissy Sukumaran Nair
- Hari
- Manavalan Joseph
- Sridevi
- T. S. Muthaiah
- Ambika
- Kottarakkara Sreedharan Nair
- Padmini
- Ragini
- S. P. Pillai

== Soundtrack ==
The music was composed by V. Dakshinamoorthy and Jaya Vijaya and the lyrics were written by M. P. Sivam, Bhoothanadha Sarvaswam, P. Bhaskaran, Vayalar Ramavarma, Traditional, Sankaracharyar, K. Narayanapilla and Sreekumaran Thampi.

No.	Song	Singers	Lyrics	Length (m:ss)
1	"Ayyappa Sharanam"	K. J. Yesudas	M. P. Sivam	
2	"Darshanam Punya Darshanam"	K. J. Yesudas	M. P. Sivam	
3	"Dhyaaye Charu Jata"	P. Jayachandran	Bhoothanadha Sarvaswam	
4	"Ellaam Ellaam"	K. P. Brahmanandan, Jaya Vijaya, K. K. Balan, M. Henry, R. C. Suresh, S. Joseph, Vaikkom Gopinath, V. T. Aravindakshamenon	P. Bhaskaran	
5	"Harisreeyennaadyamaay"	Nanu Aasan	Vayalar Ramavarma	
6	"Hemaambaraadambaree"	P. Leela	Vayalar Ramavarma	
7	"Karagre Vasathe"	Ambili	Traditional	
8	"Lapannachyuthananda"	K. J. Yesudas, P. Leela, Ambili, Latha Raju, P. Susheeladevi	Sankaracharyar	
9	"Madhuraapura Nayike"	P. Leela	Sankaracharyar	
10	"Mudaakaraatha Modakam" (Ganesha Pancharatnam)	P. Jayachandran, Ambili, K. P. Brahmanandan, Jaya Vijaya, Latha Raju, P. Susheeladevi	Sankaracharyar	
11	"Neyyitta Vilakku"	P. Susheela	K. Narayanapilla	
12	"Njaattuvelakku Njan Natta"	P. Susheeladevi	Vayalar Ramavarma	
13	"Om Namasthe Sarvashaktha"	P. Jayachandran, K. P. Brahmanandan, Kesavan Nampoothiri	K. Narayanapilla	
14	"Paarvanendu"	P. Leela, Ambili, Latha Raju, P. Susheeladevi, Leela Warrior	P. Bhaskaran	
15	"Sharanam Sharanam"	Jaya Vijaya	Sreekumaran Thampi	
16	"Shiva Rama Govinda"	K. J. Yesudas	Traditional	
17	"Thripura Sundaree Naadhan"	K. P. Brahmanandan, Jaya Vijaya, K. K. Balan, M. Henry, R. C. Suresh, S. Joseph, Vaikkom Gopinath, V. T. Aravindakshamenon	Sreekumaran Thampi	
18	"Unmaadinikal Udyaanalathakal"	P. Leela	Vayalar Ramavarma	
