= Achanum Makanum =

- Directed by: Vimalkumar
- Written by: Jagathy N. K. Achary
- Screenplay by: Jagathy N. K. Achari
- Starring: Prem Nazir; Kumari Thankam
- Cinematography: Vasudev Karnataki
- Edited by: A. Appu
- Music by: Vimalkumar
- Production company: Padma Pictures
- Release date: 26 April 1957
- Country: India
- Language: Malayalam

Achanum Makanum is a 1957 Indian Malayalam-language film, directed by Vimalkumar. The film stars Prem Nazir and Kumari Thankam. The film had musical score by V. Dakshinamoorthy. It is the first movie of actor Jagathy Sreekumar.

CAST

Prem nazir as Premchand

- Sathyan as Reghu
- Bahadoor as Arjunan
- K. V. Shanthi as Shrikala
- Kumari Thankam as Sarasu
- S. P. Pillai as Forest Officer
- T. S. Muthaiah as Premchand
- G. K. Pillai as Constable Velu Pilla
- Jagathy Sreekumar as Vikraman (Child Artist)
- Gopi as Neelan Kandan
- B. S. Saroja as Kamalam
- Kunjikkuttan as Muthalali
- Thikkurissy Sukumaran Nair as Shankaracharu
- Abraham Joseph as Vikraman
- Kuttan Pillai as Adv. Mohan Kumar
- Muthukulam Raghavan Pillai as Adv. Manoharam Pilla
- Anayara M. P. as Uttharavu Kaimal
- Kalaikkal Kumaran as Raman

== Soundtrack ==
The film's soundtrack contains 11 songs, all composed by Vimalkumar and Lyrics by Thirunalloor Karunakaran, Thirunainar Kurichi Madhavan Nair, and P. Bhaskaran.

#	Title	Singer(s)	Lyrics
1	"Aamalarkkaavil"	A. M. Rajah, K. Rani	Thirunalloor Karunakaran
2	"Ashathan Poonkavil"		Thirunainar Kurichi Madhavan Nair
3	"Katte Nee Veesharuthippol"	Shyamala	Thirunalloor Karunakaran
4	"Kannin Karalumaay Thanne"		Thirunalloor Karunakaran
5	"Karalithende"		Thirunalloor Karunakaran
6	"Kettille Ningal Vishesham"		Thirunainar Kurichi Madhavan Nair
7	"Njanoru Mulla"	K. Rani	Thirunainar Kurichi Madhavan Nair
8	"Poomala Vittodiyirangiya"	A. M. Rajah, Jikki, Chorus	P. Bhaskaran
9	"Poonchela Chuttiyilla"	Stella Varghese	P. Bhaskaran
10	"Thaare Vaa"	Santha P. Nair	Thirunainar Kurichi Madhavan Nair
11	"Vellaambal"	A. M. Rajah	Thirunalloor Karunakaran
