= Arakkillam =

- Directed by: N. Sankaran Nair
- Written by: S. L. Puram Sadanandan
- Screenplay by: S. L. Puram Sadanandan
- Produced by: N. Sankaran Nair
- Starring: Sathyan; Sharada; Miss Kumari; Adoor Bhasi
- Cinematography: R. N. Pillai
- Edited by: K. D. George
- Music by: G. Devarajan
- Production company: Kalanikethan
- Distributed by: Kalanikethan
- Release date: 14 April 1967
- Country: India
- Language: Malayalam

Arakkillam is a 1967 Indian Malayalam-language film, directed by N. Sankaran Nair and produced by N. Sankaran Nair. The film stars Sathyan, Sharada, Miss Kumari and Adoor Bhasi. The film had musical score by G. Devarajan.

== Cast ==
- Sathyan
- Sharada
- Miss Kumari
- Adoor Bhasi
- Paul Vengola
- Kaduvakulam Antony
- Kottayam Chellappan
- Rathidevi
- S. P. Pillai
- Sree Narayana Pillai

== Soundtrack ==
The music was composed by G. Devarajan and the lyrics were written by Vayalar Ramavarma.

No.	Song	Singers	Lyrics	Length (m:ss)
1	"Chithrashalabhame"	L. R. Eeswari	Vayalar Ramavarma	
2	"Kaatharamizhi"	P. Leela	Vayalar Ramavarma	
3	"Mayilaadum Mathilakathu"	P. Susheela	Vayalar Ramavarma	
4	"Ormakale"	S. Janaki, P. B. Sreenivas	Vayalar Ramavarma	
5	"Virahini"	K. J. Yesudas	Vayalar Ramavarma	
