= Inapraavugal =

Inapravugal
- Directed by: Kunchacko
- Written by: Muttathu Varkey
- Produced by: Kunchacko
- Music by: Dakshinamoorthy
- Production company: Udaya Studios
- Release date: 10 April 1965
- Country: India
- Language: Malayalam

Inapravugal is a 1965 Malayalam language film. It was directed by Kunchacko. Sharada made her debut in this movie. The movie has other notable actors like Satyan, Prem Nazir, Muthaiah, Thikkurissy Sukumaran Nair, Kottarakara Sreedharan Nair, S. P. Pillai and Pankajavalli, along with Sharada (in her major Malayalam debut).

== Plot ==
Kochappi is the neighbor of Kuncheria, a bullock cart owner. Kochappi is a ferry owner and his son Anthony is in love with Kuncheria's daughter Rahel. The two families decide to get them married according to the wishes of Rahel and Anthony. Chandy is a rich landlord of the village and his son Rajan returns to his village after doing his studies abroad. Rajan gets attracted to Rahel and approach her parents to express the interest to marry her. Rajan was unaware of Rahel's relationship with Anthony. Chandy refuses Rajan's proposal only because Rahel is poor, but finally agreed with his son's wish. Rahel's greedy parents agree with Rajan's proposal, forgetting the promise they had made to Anthony's parents. This decision creates enmity between both families, who were once good neighbors. Rahel is helpless and unable to object. Anthony falls ill and dies on the day of Rahel's marriage with Rajan. Unable to bear the grief, she faints and dies after a few days. Rahel is cremated near the grave of Anthony.

== Cast ==
- Satyan as Anthony
- Prem Nazir as Chandy's son Rajan
- T. S. Muthaiah as Kochappi
- Thikkurissy Sukumaran Nair as Chandy
- Kottarakara Sreedharan Nair as Kuncheria
- S. P. Pillai as Kutty
- Pankajavalli
- Sharada as Kuncheria's daughter Rahel (Debut)

== Soundtrack ==
The music was composed by V. Dakshinamoorthy and the lyrics were written by Vayalar Ramavarma.

Song	Singers
"Akkaraykkundo"	A. M. Rajah
"Ichirippoovalan"	Jikki, Latha Raju
"Kaakkathamburaatti"	K. J. Yesudas
"Karivala Karivala"	P. Leela, P. B. Sreenivas
"Kurutholapperunnalinu"	K. J. Yesudas, P. Susheela
"Pathupara Vithupaadu"	L. R. Eeswari, C. O. Anto
"Virinjathenthinu"	P. Susheela
