= Koodappirappu =

- Directed by: J. D. Thottan
- Written by: Muthukulam Raghavan Pillai
- Screenplay by: Ponjikkara Rafi
- Produced by: Rasheed
- Starring: Prem Navas, T. S. Muthaiah, Muthukulam Raghavan Pillai, Ambika, Miss Kumari, Kumari Thankam, Adoor Pankajam
- Cinematography: N. S. Mani
- Music by: K. Raghavan
- Distributed by: Chandrathara Pictures
- Release date: 19 October 1956
- Country: India
- Language: Malayalam

Koodappirappu (transl. Those born together) is a 1956 Malayalam film produced by Rasheed and directed by J. D. Thottan under the banner of Kadeeja Production. The story was written by Muthukulam Raghavan Pillai. This was the debut for both Vayalar Ramavarma and actress Sukumari Nair.

== Cast ==
- Prem Navas
- T. S. Muthaiah
- Muthukulam Raghavan Pillai
- Ambika
- Miss Kumari
- Kumari Thankam
- Adoor Pankajam

== Soundtrack ==
The film has 11 songs, 10 of which were written by Vayalar Rama Varma and 1 song by Swathi Thirunal, named Alarsharaparithaapam. The songs were composed by K. Raghavan and sung by A. M. Rajah, Santha P. Nair, M. L. Vasanthakumari and K. Raghavan.

No.	Song	Lyrics	Music	Singer
1	"Alarsharaparithaapam"	Swathi Thirunal	K. Raghavan	M. L. Vasanthakumari
2	"Aayiram Kaikalu"	Vayalar Rama Varma	K. Raghavan	K. Raghavan, Santha P. Nair (Chorus)
3	"Angaadee Thottu Madangiya"	Vayalar Rama Varma	K. Raghavan	A. M. Rajah, Santha P. Nair
4	"Budham Sharanam"	Vayalar Rama Varma	K. Raghavan	K. Raghavan
5	"Chingaarappenninte"	Vayalar Rama Varma	K. Raghavan	Santha P. Nair
6	"Enthinu Ponkanikal"	Vayalar Rama Varma	K. Raghavan	Santha P. Nair
7	"Maanasa Rani"	Vayalar Rama Varma	K. Raghavan	A. M. Rajah
8	"Manivarnane Innu Njan"	Vayalar Rama Varma	K. Raghavan	M. L. Vasanthakumari
9	"Paathumma Beeveede"	Vayalar Rama Varma	K. Raghavan	K. Raghavan
10	"Poomulla Poothallo"	Vayalar Rama Varma	K. Raghavan	Santha P. Nair
11	"Thumbi Thumbi Vava"	Vayalar Rama Varma	K. Raghavan	Santha P. Nair
