= Kidappadam =

- Directed by: M. R. S. Mani
- Written by: M. Kunchacko
- Screenplay by: Muthukulam Raghavan Pilla
- Produced by: M. Kunchacko
- Starring: Prem Nazir; Miss Kumari
- Cinematography: P. B. Mani
- Edited by: K. D. George
- Music by: V. Dakshinamoorthy
- Production company: Excel Productions
- Release date: 11 February 1955
- Country: India
- Language: Malayalam

Kidappadam is a 1955 Indian Malayalam-language film, directed by M. R. S. Mani and produced by M. Kunchacko. The film stars Prem Nazir and Kumari Thankam. The film had musical score by V. Dakshinamoorthy. The popular song "Kunkuma Chaaraninju" is from this movie.

== Cast ==
- Prem Nazir
- Miss Kumari
- Thikkurissy Sukumaran Nair
- Muthukulam Raghavan Pilla
- Boban Kunchacko
- Adoor Pankajam
- Kalaikkal Kumaran
