= Devatha (1965 film) =

- Directed by: K. Padmanabhan Nair; W. R. Subba Rao
- Written by: K. Padmanabhan Nair
- Screenplay by: K. Padmanabhan Nair
- Produced by: Bharathi Menon
- Starring: Prem Nazir; Sathyan; Adoor Bhasi; T. S. Muthaiah
- Cinematography: W. R. Subba Rao
- Music by: P. S. Divakar
- Release date: 14 January 1965
- Country: India
- Language: Malayalam

Devatha is a 1965 Indian Malayalam film, directed by K. Padmanabhan Nair and produced by Bharathi Menon. The film stars Prem Nazir, Sathyan, Adoor Bhasi and T. S. Muthaiah in the lead roles. The film had musical score by P. S. Divakar.

== Cast ==
- Prem Nazir
- Sathyan
- Adoor Bhasi
- T. S. Muthaiah
- Bharathi Menon
- Adoor Pankajam
- Ambika
- Baby Padmini
- S. P. Pillai
- Sasikala
- Sushama

== Soundtrack ==
The music was composed by P. S. Divakar and lyrics were written by Jayadevar and P. Bhaskaran, or are Traditional.

No.	Song	Singers	Lyrics	Length (m:ss)
1	"Dheerasameere	P. Leela, M. Balamuralikrishna	Jayadevar	
2	"Janmabhoomi Bhaaratham	K. J. Yesudas, Chorus, Latha Raju	P. Bhaskaran	
3	"Kaalam Thaychutharunnu"	K. J. Yesudas, P. Leela	P. Bhaskaran	
4	"Kaappiri Thannude Kannil"	K. J. Yesudas, P. Leela	P. Bhaskaran	
5	"Kannil Kaanunna"	M. Balamuralikrishna	P. Bhaskaran	
6	"Kannillengilum"	P. Leela	P. Bhaskaran	
7	"Kannukalennal"	K. J. Yesudas, P. Leela	P. Bhaskaran]	
8	"Kannukalennal"	Chorus, Latha Raju	P. Bhaskaran	
9	"Karutha Hridayam Moodaan"	K. J. Yesudas, P. Leela	P. Bhaskaran	
10	"Ormavaykkenam"	S. Janaki, M. Balamuralikrishna	P. Bhaskaran	
11	"Orunal Ennonanilaave"	S. Janaki	P. Bhaskaran	
12	"Padachavan Namukku"	K. J. Yesudas, K. P. Udayabhanu, Raghu	P. Bhaskaran	
13	"Thaalolam Unni"	P. Leela, M. Balamuralikrishna	P. Bhaskaran	
14	"Yogeendrarkkumalakashyanaay"	P. Leela	Traditional	
