= C.I.D. (1955 film) =

- Directed by: M. Krishnan Nair
- Written by: T. N. Gopinathan Nair
- Produced by: P. Subramaniam (Merryland)
- Starring: Prem Nazir; Miss Kumari; Kottarakkara Sreedharan Nair; Kumari Thankam
- Cinematography: N. S. Mani
- Edited by: K. D. George
- Music by: Br Lakshmanan (songs); Thirunayinarkurichi (lyrics)
- Production company: Neela Productions
- Distributed by: Kumaraswamy & Co. (Travancore); Film Distributing Co. (Malabar & Cochin)
- Release date: 27 August 1955
- Running time: 170 minutes
- Country: India
- Language: Malayalam

C.I.D. is a 1955 Indian Malayalam film made for Merryland Studio by director M. Krishnan Nair which stars Prem Nazir, Miss Kumari, Kottarakkara Sreedharan Nair and Kumari Thankam. It is generally considered as the first crime thriller movie in Malayalam.

The film was dubbed into Tamil with the same title and was released in the same year, 1955. K. Devanarayanan wrote the lyrics and dialogues.

== Plot ==
C.I.D. Sudhakaran discovers who is behind the murder and in the end marries Menon's daughter Vasanthi.

== Cast ==
- Prem Nazir as C.I.D. Sudhakaran
- Miss Kumari as Vasanthi
- Kottarakkara Sreedharan Nair as Vallabhan
- Kumari Thankam as Valsala
- S. P. Pillai as Pichu & Vava
- Soman as Rudrapalan
- T. S. Muthaiah as Pachan
- Adoor Pankajam as Panki
- Jose Prakash as Mukunda Menon
- Sreekantan Nair as Inspector
- Kuttan Pillai as Sivaraman
