= Chakravakam (1974 Malayalam film) =

- Directed by: Thoppil Bhasi
- Written by: M. K. Mani; Thoppil Bhasi (dialogues)
- Screenplay by: Thoppil Bhasi
- Starring: Prem Nazir; Kaviyoor Ponnamma; KPAC Lalitha; Adoor Bhasi
- Cinematography: U. Rajagopal
- Edited by: G. Venkittaraman
- Music by: Shankar–Ganesh
- Production company: Rainbow Enterprises
- Distributed by: Rainbow Enterprises
- Release date: 3 August 1974
- Country: India
- Language: Malayalam

Chakravakam is a 1974 Indian Malayalam film, directed by Thoppil Bhasi. The film stars Prem Nazir, Kaviyoor Ponnamma, KPAC Lalitha and Adoor Bhasi in the lead roles. The film has musical score by Shankar–Ganesh.

== Cast ==
- Prem Nazir as Raghavan
- Kaviyoor Ponnamma as Soshamma
- KPAC Lalitha as Branti Paru
- Adoor Bhasi as Sankaran
- Mani
- Shanthi
- T. S. Muthaiah as Devassia's father
- Baby Shanthi
- Indira
- Mohanan
- Oduvil Unnikrishnan as Mammad
- Paravoor Bharathan as Devassia
- Sujatha as Devaki
- Sumithra as Padmini
- Treesa

== Soundtrack ==
The music was composed by Shankar–Ganesh and the lyrics were written by Vayalar Ramavarma.

No.	Song	Singers	Lyrics	Length (m:ss)
1	"Gaganame Gaganame"	K. J. Yesudas	Vayalar Ramavarma	
2	"Makayiram Nakshathram"	S. Janaki	Vayalar Ramavarma	
3	"Makayiram Nakshathram" [D]	K. J. Yesudas, S. Janaki	Vayalar Ramavarma	
4	"Padinjaaroru Paalaazhi"	K. J. Yesudas, Latha Raju	Vayalar Ramavarma	
5	"Pambaanadiyile"	P. Susheela	Vayalar Ramavarma	
6	"Velutha Vavinum"	K. J. Yesudas, Adoor Bhasi, Sreelatha Namboothiri	Vayalar Ramavarma	
