= Aathmasakhi =

1952 film by G.R. Rao

- Poster
- Directed by: G. R. Rao
- Written by: K. P. Kottarakkara
- Screenplay by: Thirunayinaarkurichi Madhavan Nair
- Starring: Sathyan; B. S. Saroja
- Music by: Br Lakshmanan
- Release date: 17 October 1952
- Country: India
- Language: Malayalam

Aathmasakhi (transl. Soul partner) is a 1952 Indian Malayalam-language drama film directed by G. R. Rao. The film marks the acting debut of Sathyan, who played the lead role along with B. S. Saroja. The film has musical score by Br Lakshmanan.

The film was dubbed into Tamil with the title Priyasakhi and was released on 13 September 1952. Dialogues and lyrics were written by Kambadasan.

== Malayalam Cast ==
Male cast

- Sathyan
- Veeran
- M. N. Nambiar
- K. P. Kottarakkara
- T. S. Muthaiah
- Muthukulam Raghavan Pillai

Female cast

- Ambalappuzha Meenakshi
- B. S. Saroja
- Miss Kumari
- Pankajavalli
- Kumari Thankam
- C. R. Lakshmi
- N. R. Thankam

== Tamil Cast ==
Cast adapted from the song book

Male cast

- Sathyan as Ragu
- Veeran as Zamindar
- M. N. Nambiar as Mohan
- Ramaswami (Friend) as Kuppan
- K. P. Kottarakkarai as Hari
- Kalyanam as Raman
- Muthaiah as Rajan
- Venkitaraman as Doctor

Female cast

- Ambalapuzhai Meenakshi as Kalyani
- B. S. Saroja as Shantha
- Miss Kumari as Leela
- Pankajavalli as Kamalam
- Kumari Thankam as Indira
- C. R. Lakshmi Devi as Lakshmi
- N. R. Thangam as Malathi
