= Deva Sundari =

- Directed by: M. K. R. Nambiar
- Written by: Sreemathi Munnas
- Produced by: H. M. Munnas
- Starring: Sathyan; Prem Nazir
- Music by: T. R. Pappa
- Production company: Munna's Films
- Release date: 29 November 1957
- Country: India
- Language: Malayalam

Deva Sundari is a 1957 Indian Malayalam-language film, directed by M. K. R. Nambiar and produced by H. M. Munnas. The film stars Sathyan and Ragini. The film had musical score by T. R. Pappa.

== Cast ==
- Sathyan
- Prem Nazir
- Jose Prakash
- T. S. Muthaiah
- Adoor Pankajam
- G. K. Pillai
- Kumari Thankam
- S. P. Pillai
- Johnson
- Vijayan (Old)

== Music ==
1. "Jayajaya Suranayaka" - P. Leela
2. "Sree Padmanaava" - A. P. Komala
3. "Pachasumarasara" - Kameswara Rao
