= Agniputhri =

- Poster
- Directed by: M. Krishnan Nair
- Written by: S. L. Puram Sadanandan
- Produced by: Prem Navas
- Starring: Prem Nazir; Sheela; T. R. Omana; T. S. Muthaiah
- Cinematography: N. S. Mani
- Edited by: V. P. Krishnan
- Music by: M. S. Baburaj
- Release date: 18 March 1967
- Country: India
- Language: Malayalam

Agniputhri is a 1967 Indian Malayalam-language film, directed by M. Krishnan Nair and produced by Prem Navas. The film stars Prem Nazir, Sheela, T. R. Omana and T. S. Muthaiah. M. S. Baburaj composed the musical score and songs. It won the National Film Award for Best Screenplay. The film was remade in Hindi as Darpan (1970).

== Cast ==
- Prem Nazir as Rajendran
- Sheela as Sindhu
- T. R. Omana as Muthassi
- T. S. Muthaiah as Dr. Jayadevan
- Aranmula Ponnamma as Saraswathi
- Baby Usha (Usharani) as Bindu
- Meena
- T. K. Balachandran as Balachandran
- Vasantha as Sandhya
- Adoor Bhasi as Dance Master Parvathidas
- Bahadoor as Appunni Nair
- S. P. Pillai as Adukkalakkaran Embranthiri
- Kaduvakulam Antony

== Soundtrack ==
The music was composed by M. S. Baburaj and the lyrics were written by Vayalar Ramavarma.

No.	Song	Singers	Lyrics	Length (m:ss)
1	"Aakaashathile"	P. Susheela	Vayalar Ramavarma	
2	"Agninakshathrame"	P. Susheela	Vayalar Ramavarma	
3	"Iniyum Puzhayozhukum"	P. Jayachandran	Vayalar Ramavarma	
4	"Kannuthurakkaatha"	P. Susheela	Vayalar Ramavarma	
5	"Kilikiliparunthinu"	P. Susheela	Vayalar Ramavarma	
6	"Raajeeva Lochane"	P. Jayachandran	Vayalar Ramavarma	

== Awards ==
- Filmfare Award for Best Film - Malayalam won by Prem Nawaz (1967)
