= Marumakal =

- Directed by: M. K. Chari
- Screenplay by: Kedamangalam Sadanandan
- Story by: M. P. Productions
- Produced by: Paul Kallungal
- Starring: Prem Nazir; Kedamangalam Sadanandan; T. S. Muthaiah; S. J. Dev; Neyyattinkara Komalam; Revathi; Ammini; S. V. Susheela; L. Vijayalakshmi; Durga Varma
- Music by: P. S. Divakar
- Production company: M. P. Productions
- Distributed by: Pearl Pictures
- Release date: 9 May 1952
- Country: India
- Language: Malayalam

Marumakal (transl. Daughter-in-law) is a 1952 Indian Malayalam-language family drama film directed by M. K. Chari, written by Kedamangalam Sadanandan and produced by Paul Kallungal. The film marks the onscreen debut of Prem Nazir (then credited by his birth name Abdul Khader), who played the lead role, and also features Kedamangalam Sadanandan, T. S. Muthaiah, S. J. Dev, Neyyattinkara Komalam, Revathi, Ammini, S. V. Susheela, Vijayalakshmi and Durga Varma in other prominent roles.

== Cast ==
- Prem Nazir (credited as Abdul Khader)
- Kedamangalam Sadanandan
- T. S. Muthaiah
- S. J. Dev
- Neyyattinkara Komalam

== Box office ==
The film was a box office disaster.
