= Nairu Pidicha Pulivalu =

- Directed by: P. Bhaskaran
- Written by: Uroob
- Based on: "Business" by Uroob
- Produced by: T. E. Vasudevan
- Starring: Ragini; Sathyan
- Music by: K. Raghavan (songs); P. Bhaskaran (lyrics); K. V. Mahadevan (background score)
- Release date: 14 February 1958
- Country: India
- Language: Malayalam

Nairu Pidicha Pulivalu (transl. Tiger tail caught by Nair) is a 1958 Malayalam film directed by P. Bhaskaran and written by Uroob based on his own story "Business". Ragini and Sathyan play the lead roles, while Prema, Pankajavalli, and T.S. Muthayya appear in major supporting roles. The film received a certificate of merit at the National Film Awards.

== Plot ==
A traveling circus company owes money to Paithal Nair. When they cannot pay, Nair and his wife decide to confiscate the circus animals as collateral. Managing wild circus animals quickly becomes an absolute nightmare for the family. By trying to secure his money, Paithal Nair literally "catches a tiger by its tail," trapping himself in a chaotic disaster.

== Cast ==
- Ragini as Thankam
- Sathyan as Chandran
- Prema Menon as Lalitha, a circus performer who also loves Chandran
- Pankajavalli as Kalyani Amma
- T. S. Muthaiah as Paithal Nair
- Muthukulam Raghavan Pillai as Kuttappa Kurup
- S. P. Pillai as Chanthu, a circus joker
- Bahadoor as Keshu, a circus joker
- G. K. Pillai as Gopi
- T. N. Gopinathan Nair as Circus Proprietor
- Kochappan as Kirukkan Kochunni
- Kunhava as Khader
- Vaanakkutty as Kurup's Guru
- TKR Bhadran

== Soundtrack ==
The music was composed by K. Raghavan with lyrics by P. Bhaskaran.

No.	Song	Singers	Lyrics	Length (m:ss)
1	"Kaathu Sookshichoru"	Mehboob	P. Bhaskaran	
2	"Haalu Pidichoru Puliyachan"	Mehboob	P. Bhaskaran	
3	"Ponnaninjittila Njaan"	P Leela	P. Bhaskaran	
4	"Iniyennu Kaanumen"	P Leela	P. Bhaskaran	
5	"Kannuneerithu"	P Leela	P. Bhaskaran	
6	"Enthinithra Panchasaara"	KP Udayabhanu	P. Bhaskaran	
7	"Velutha Penne"	KP Udayabhanu, P Leela	P. Bhaskaran	
8	Dhinakku Dhinakku	K Raghavan, Chorus, Mehboob	P. Bhaskaran	
