= Velakkaran =

- Directed by: E. R. Cooper
- Written by: Muthukulam Raghavan Pilla
- Screenplay by: Muthukulam Raghavan Pilla
- Produced by: K. G. Sreedharan Nair
- Starring: Thikkurissy Sukumaran Nair, P. K. Saraswathi
- Cinematography: E. R. Cooper
- Music by: V. Dakshinamoorthy
- Production company: Bhadra Productions
- Release date: 12 February 1953
- Country: India
- Language: Malayalam

Velakkaran is a 1953 Indian Malayalam-language film, directed by E. R. Cooper and produced by K. G. Sreedharan Nair. The film stars Thikkurissy Sukumaran Nair and P. K. Saraswathi. It features a musical score by V. Dakshinamoorthy.

The song "Paahimaam Jagadeeswara" is recognized as the first recorded Ayyappa devotional song in Malayalam cinema history.

== Cast ==
- P. K. Saraswathi
- Pankajavalli
- S. P. Pillai
- Thikkurissy Sukumaran Nair
- Jagadamma
- K. G. Sreedharan Nair
- Sumathi
- Sasikumar
- Alleppey Shankar
- K. P. Kesavan
- Augustine Joseph
