= Ponkathir =

1953 film

Ponkathir / Irulukku Pin
- Directed by: E. R. Cooper
- Written by: Muthukulam Raghavan Pilla, K. P. Kottarakkara
- Screenplay by: Muthukulam Raghavan Pilla, K. P. Kottarakkara
- Produced by: P. Subramaniam
- Starring: Prem Nazir; Lalitha
- Cinematography: V. Ramamurthi
- Edited by: K. D. George
- Music by: Br Lakshmanan
- Production company: Neela
- Distributed by: A Kumaraswamy Release
- Release date: 17 October 1953
- Country: India
- Language: Malayalam

Ponkathir is a 1953 Indian Malayalam-language film, directed by E. R. Cooper and produced by P. Subramaniam. The film stars Prem Nazir and Thikkurissy Sukumaran Nair. The film was dubbed into Tamil with the title Irulukku Pin and released in 1954.

== Plot ==
Ravi is the son of a rich industrialist Prabhu. Madhu is the Factory Manager. Business flourishes under Madhu. Vikraman is Prabhu's nephew who tries to manipulate the assets of Prabhu. Ravi loves Radha, daughter of a poor farmer who is also a friend of Prabhu. Vikraman also loves Radha. The story is woven around these people. After many twists and turns, all ends well.

== Cast ==
Male cast

- Prem Nazir as Ravi
- S. P. Pillai as Pappan
- Thikkurissy Sukumaran Nair as Vikraman
- T. S. Muthaiah as Shanku
- C. I. Parameswaran Pillai
- K. P. Kottarakkara
- SR Pallatt
- Muthukulam Raghavan Pillai as Mathupilla
- Soman

Female cast

- Lalitha as Radha
- C. S. Radhadevi
- * T. R. Omana
- Adoor Pankajam
- Kumari Thankam
- K. V. Shanthi
- Aranmula Ponnamma
- Pankajavalli
- Ragini
- Bharathi

== Production ==
The film was produced under the banner Neela Productions and was directed by E. R. Cooper. The story and dialogues were written by K. P. Kottarakkara. Cinematography was handled by V. Ramamoorthy and the sound recording was done by Krishna Elamon. This is the film debut for Playback singer Kamukara Purushothaman and stage actor C. I. Parameswaran Pillai.

== Soundtrack ==
Music was composed by Br Lakshmanan and the lyrics were penned by Thirunainar Kurichi Madhavan Nair. Playback singers are Kaviyoor Revamma, Ganabhooshanam N. Lalitha, Jikki, Mehboob and Kamukara Purushothaman.

Anjana Sreedharaa Chaarumoorthey Krishnaa..., a song sung by N. Lalitha in traditional style, became popular and is considered one of the best devotional film songs in Malayalam.

No.	Song	Singers	Lyrics	Length (m:ss)
1	"Aanandaroopan	Jikki	Thirunainar Kurichi Madhavan Nair	02:42
2	"Aanandavaasam Amaravilaasam"	N. Lalitha	Thirunainar Kurichi Madhavan Nair	
3	"Aashankaathimiram"	Kamukara Purushothaman	Thirunainar Kurichi Madhavan Nair	00:52
4	"Ullaasam Ulakellam"	Mehboob, N. Lalitha & Kaviyoor Revamma	Thirunainar Kurichi Madhavan Nair	03:18
5	"Kaliyaadum Poove Varoo"	Jikki	Thirunainar Kurichi Madhavan Nair	02:54
6	"Oh Premamadhuramee"		Thirunainar Kurichi Madhavan Nair	
7	"Paadoo Maanasame"	Jikki	Thirunainar Kurichi Madhavan Nair	02:46
8	"Paarirulmoodi Paathayaake"	N. Lalitha	Thirunainar Kurichi Madhavan Nair	03:19
9	"Povukanaam"	Gokulapalan & P. Leela	Thirunainar Kurichi Madhavan Nair	07:11
10	"Pranayamohana Swapnam"	Gokulapalan & N. Lalitha	Thirunainar Kurichi Madhavan Nair	03:07
11	"Sakalam Vidhiyalle Paaril"	Mehboob	Thirunainar Kurichi Madhavan Nair	03:47
12	"Sukhame Sukhame"	Kamukara Purushothaman, N. Lalitha & Kaviyoor Revamma	Thirunainar Kurichi Madhavan Nair	
13	"Anjana Sreedhara"	N. Lalitha	Traditional	03:17
