= Suhruthu =

- Directed by: Joseph Pallippaattu
- Written by: Joseph Pallippaattu
- Screenplay by: Joseph Pallippaattu
- Starring: M. S. Namboothiri, Alex Parakkal
- Music by: G. Viswanath
- Release date: 16 January 1952
- Country: India
- Language: Malayalam

Suhruthu is a 1952 Indian Malayalam-language film, directed by Joseph Pallippaattu. The film stars M. S. Namboothiri and Alex Parakkal. The film had musical score by G. Viswanath.

== Cast ==
- M. S. Namboothiri
- Alex Parakkal
- G. M. Hastings
- M. P. Sanku
- P. M. Revamma
- V. Ramachandran
- P. K. Sankar
