= Padatha Painkili =

- Directed by: P. Subramaniam
- Written by: Muttathu Varkey
- Based on: Padatha Painkili by Muttathu Varkey
- Produced by: P. Subramaniam
- Starring: Prem Nazir; Miss Kumari; K. V. Shanthi
- Edited by: K. D. George
- Music by: Brother Lakshmanan
- Production company: Neela Productions
- Release date: 22 March 1957
- Country: India
- Language: Malayalam

Padatha Painkili (transl. The Mute Nightingale) is a 1957 Indian Malayalam-language drama film based on the novel of the same name by Muttathu Varkey and directed by P. Subramaniam from a screenplay by Varkey. The film revolves around marriage and dowry problems. It depicts the machinations of a wicked, though wealthy man, against a poverty-stricken, God-fearing schoolteacher, with the final defeat of evil in the end. It stars Prem Nazir, Miss Kumari and Shanthi.

The film released in theatres on 22 March and went on to become a major critical and commercial success.The film marks the debut of Shanthi. Bahadoor's role as Chakkaravakkal was his first break. It won the National Film Award for Best Feature Film in Malayalam.

== Cast ==
- Prem Nazir as Thankachan
- Miss Kumari as Chinnamma
- K. V. Shanthi as Lucy
- Kottarakkara Sreedharan Nair as Vendor Kutty
- Bahadoor as Chakkaravakkal
- T. S. Muthaiah as Luke (Luka Sir)
- Aranmula Ponnamma as Kunjadamma
- Vaanakkutti as Peeli
- S. P. Pillai as Mylan
- Adoor Pankajam as Thevi
- Pankajavalli
- T. N. Gopinathan Nair
- S. Menon
- Latheef
- Kuttiyamma

== Soundtrack ==
The film's music was composed by Brother Lakshmanan with lyrics penned by Thirunayinaarkurichi Madhavan Nair.

1. "Aaru Nee Agathiyo" — Kamukara, Santha P. Nair
2. "Kaalithan Thozhuthil" — P. Leela, Chorus
3. "Kalyaanaraave (Bit)" — Santha P. Nair
4. "Madhumaasamayallo" — Kamukara, Santha P. Nair
5. "Mangalam" — Kamukara, Santha P. Nair
6. "Naaduchutti Odivaroo" — Mehboob
7. "Naayaka Poroo" — Uncategorized
8. "Njan Natta Thoomulla" — Santha P. Nair
9. "Paadedi Paadedi" — Kamukara, C. S. Radhadevi
10. "Poomani Kovilil" — Santha P. Nair
11. "Snehame Karayatta Nin Kai" — Kamukara
12. "Thanthoya Thenundu" — P. Gangadharan Nair, C. S. Radhadevi
13. "Vellaambal Poothu" — Kamukara, Santha P. Nair

== Awards ==
- National Film Awards
  - 1957 - National Film Award for Best Feature Film in Malayalam
