= Aniyathi (film) =

- Newspaper snippet
- Directed by: M. Krishnan Nair
- Written by: M. Kunchacko
- Screenplay by: T. N. Gopinathan Nair
- Produced by: P. Subramaniam
- Starring: Prem Nazir; Miss Kumari
- Cinematography: N. S. Mani
- Edited by: K. D. George
- Music by: Br. Lakshmanan
- Production company: Neela
- Distributed by: Kumaraswamy & Co.
- Release date: 11 February 1955
- Country: India
- Language: Malayalam

Aniyathi is a 1955 Indian Malayalam-language film, directed by M. Krishnan Nair and produced by P. Subramaniam. The film stars Prem Nazir and Miss Kumari. The musical score by Br. Lakshmanan includes the popular song "Kunkuma Chaaraninju". Miss Kumari won Madras Film Fans Association Award for Best Actress (1956) for her performance in the film.

== Cast ==
- Prem Nazir as Rajappan
- Jayan as James
- Jayabharathi as Sreedevi
- Vincent as Vijayan
- Sukumaran as Raghavan
- Unnimary as Ragini
- K.P Ummer as Inspector.Madhavan
- Nandhitha Bose as Thankhamma
- Adoorbhasi as Vasu Pilla
