= Sasidharan =

- Directed by: T Janaki Ram
- Written by: N. P. Chellappan Nair
- Screenplay by: N. P. Chellappan Nair
- Produced by: Swami Narayanan, K. Kunjukrishnan
- Starring: Nagavally R. S. Kurup, N. P. Chellappan Nair, Miss Kumari
- Music by: P. Kalinga Rao
- Release date: 13 April 1950
- Country: India
- Language: Malayalam

Sasidharan is a 1950 Indian Malayalam-language film, directed by T Janaki Ram and produced by Swami Narayanan. The film stars Nagavally R. S. Kurup, N. P. Chellappan Nair and Miss Kumari in lead roles. The film had musical score by P. Kalinga Rao. It is the first Malayalam film adaptation of a popular stage play. It is the debut Malayalam film of P. Kalinga Rao, T. Janakiram, Aranmula Ponnamma, S. P. Pillai, N. P. Chellappan Nair, Kaviyoor Revamma, P. Mohankumari, and lyricist Thumpamon Padmanabhankutty.

== Cast ==
- Kottarakkara Sreedharan Nair as Rajasekharan
- Miss Kumari as Vilasini
- Nagavally R. S. Kurup as Kumar
- N. P. Chellappan Nair as Editor
- Kaviyoor CK Revamma as Kamalam
- S. P. Pillai as Maniyan
- PK Kamalakshi as Janu
- R Kumaran Bhagavathar as Sivaram
- KK Padmanabhankutty Asan as Panicker
- T. R. Omana as Indubala
- Ambalappuzha Krishnamoorthy as Sekharan
- E Kuttiyamma Bhagavathar as Meenu
- Vaikkam Mani as Madhu
- Aranmula Ponnamma as Kalyaniyamma
- PK Vikraman Nair as Sasidharan
