= Aathmasanthi =

1952 film by Joseph Thaliyath

- Directed by: Joseph Thaliyath
- Written by: N. P. Chellappan Nair
- Screenplay by: N. P. Chellappan Nair
- Produced by: N. X. George
- Starring: T. K. Madhavan Nair, Miss Kumari
- Cinematography: R. N. Pillai, K. Bora
- Edited by: P. S. Winfred
- Music by: T. R. Pappa
- Production company: Geo Pictures
- Release date: 21 March 1952
- Country: India
- Language: Malayalam

Aathmasanthi is a 1952 Indian Malayalam-language film, directed by Joseph Thaliyath. The film stars T. K. Madhavan Nair and Miss Kumari.

The film was dubbed into Tamil with the same title and released in the same year. Tamil dialogues and songs were written by Nanchilnadu T. N. Rajappa. Two songs, "Vandi Rendum Oduthu Paar" and "Kadhal Vaazhvil Thaaney" were written by K. P. Kamatchi.

== Cast ==
- T. K. Madhavan Nair
- Miss Kumari
- Neyyaattinkara Komalam
- S. P. Pillai
- Aranmula Ponnamma

== Cast as per Tamil version ==
- Vanchiyoor as Santhanam
- Kottarakara as Sekar
- K. Ramasamy as Raghu
- S. P. Pillai as Sankaran
- P. M. Devan as Damodhara Mudaliar
- P. B. Vairam as Shet
- Miss Kumari as Nirmala
- Komalam as Saratha
- Vani as Vimala
- Ponnamma as Mangalam
- Lakshmi as Parvathi
- Menaka as Komalam
- Prabulla as Bala Nirmala

== Soundtrack ==
Music was composed by T. R. Pappa.

Malayalam

Lyrics were written by Abhayadev.

No.	Song	Singer/s	Lyricist	Duration (m:ss)
1	"Madhumayamaay"	T. A. Mothi, P. Leela & A. P. Komala	Abhayadev	03:23
2	"Maayamaanu Paaril"	P. Leela	Abhayadev	03:04
3	"Kaliyaay Pandoru Aattidayan"		Abhayadev	
4	"Kochammayaakilum"	Janamma David & Vijaya Rao	Abhayadev	
5	"Panineerppoo Pole"	T. A. Mothi & P. Leela	Abhayadev	01:53
6	"Maaruvathille Lokame"	A. P. Komala	Abhayadev	02:47
7	"Valaroo Krisheevalaa"		Abhayadev	
8	"Pazhaaya Jeevithame"	A. P. Komala	Abhayadev	02:16
9	"Aananda Kaalam"	T. A. Mothi	Abhayadev	02:53
10	"Varamaay Priyatharamaay"	A. P. Komala	Abhayadev	02:12
11	"Madhuragaayaka"	A. P. Komala	Abhayadev	02:16
12	"Marayukayaay"	A. P. Komala	Abhayadev	02:17

Tamil

Lyrics were written by T. N. Rajappa and K. P. Kamatchisundaram.

No.	Song	Singer/s	Lyricist	Duration (m:ss)
1	"Vandirendum Odudhu Paar"	T. A. Mothi & P. Leela	K. P. Kamatchisundaram	03:23
2	"Kadhal Vaazhvil Thaaney"	P. Leela	K. P. Kamatchisundaram	03:04
3	"Malaiyoram Oru Maattidaiyan"		T. N. Rajappa	
4	"Pennoda Aanaiyum Aanoda Pennaiyum"		T. N. Rajappa	
5	"Pudhu Rojaap Pole"	T. A. Mothi & P. Leela	T. N. Rajappa	01:53
6	"Valluvan Solle Vedhamaam"	A. P. Komala	T. N. Rajappa	02:47
7	"Arisi Illaamathaan Aaravunsu Podaraar"		T. N. Rajappa	
8	"Veenaasai Yen Maname"	A. P. Komala	T. N. Rajappa	02:16
9	"Aadhaaram Yedhum Ilaiye"	T. A. Mothi	T. N. Rajappa	02:53
10	"Jegame Inbha Mayame"	A. P. Komala	T. N. Rajappa	02:12
11	"Manidha Vaazhvile, Mahimaiyaanadhe"	A. P. Komala	T. N. Rajappa	02:16
12	"Manamariyaa Kaadhale"	A. P. Komala	T. N. Rajappa	02:17
