= Avan Varunnu =

- Directed by: M. R.S Mani
- Written by: M. Kunchacko
- Screenplay by: Muthukulam Raghavan Pilla
- Produced by: M. Kunchacko
- Starring: Prem Nazir, Kalaikkal Kumaran, Kumari Thankam
- Cinematography: P. B. Mani
- Music by: V. Dakshinamoorthy
- Production company: Excel Productions
- Distributed by: Excel Release
- Release date: 10 September 1954
- Country: India
- Language: Malayalam

Avan Varunnu is a 1954 Indian Malayalam-language film, directed by M. R. S. Mani and produced by M. Kunchacko. The film stars Prem Nazir and Kumari Thankam. The film had musical score by V. Dakshinamoorthy.

== Cast ==
- Prem Nazir
- Muthukulam Raghavan Pillai
- Boban Kunchacko
- Adoor Pankajam
- Ambalappuzha Rajamma
- B. S. Saroja
- Kalaikkal Kumaran
- Kottarakkara Sreedharan Nair
- Kumari Thankam
- Mathappan
- S. P. Pillai
- Subrani
- Vanakkutty
- C. R. Rajakumari
