= Kathirunna Nikah =

- Directed by: M. Krishnan Nair
- Written by: K. G. Sethunath
- Produced by: M. Raju Mathan
- Starring: Prem Nazir; Sheela; Adoor Bhasi; Thikkurissy Sukumaran Nair
- Cinematography: Venkata Varanasi; Janardanan
- Edited by: N. Pokkalath
- Music by: G. Devarajan
- Production company: Thankam Movies
- Distributed by: Thankam Movies
- Release date: 7 September 1965
- Country: India
- Language: Malayalam

Kathirunna Nikah (transl. The Long-Awaited Marriage) is a 1965 Indian Malayalam-language film, directed by M. Krishnan Nair and produced by M. Raju Mathan. The film stars Prem Nazir, Sheela, Adoor Bhasi and Thikkurissy Sukumaran Nair. The film had musical score by G. Devarajan.

== Cast ==
- Prem Nazir as Kabir
- Sheela as Laila
- T. S. Muthaiah
- Adoor Bhasi as Mammali
- Thikkurissy Sukumaran Nair as Usman
- Ambika as Vahida
- Bahadoor as Abookar
- Haji Abdul Rahman as Kabir's father
- Meena as Fathima
- S. P. Pillai as Moideen
- Kottayam Chellappan as Layla's father
- Nilambur Ayisha as Mammali's mother
- Sarala as Madhavi

== Soundtrack ==
The music was composed by G. Devarajan and the lyrics were written by Vayalar Ramavarma.

No.	Song	Singers	Lyrics	Length (m:ss)
1	"Agaadhaneelimayil"	K. J. Yesudas	Vayalar Ramavarma	
2	"Kandaalazhakulla"	L. R. Eeswari, Chorus	Vayalar Ramavarma	
3	"Kaniyallayo"	P. Susheela	Vayalar Ramavarma	
4	"Maadappiraave"	A. M. Rajah	Vayalar Ramavarma	
5	"Nenmeni Vaakappoonkaavil"	P. Susheela	Vayalar Ramavarma	
6	"Pachakkarimbu Kondu"	K. P. Udayabhanu	Vayalar Ramavarma	
7	"Swapnathilenne"	P. Susheela	Vayalar Ramavarma	
8	"Veettil Orutharum"	P. Susheela, A. M. Rajah	Vayalar Ramavarma	
