= Harishchandra (1955 film) =

- Directed by: Antony Mitradas
- Produced by: P. Subramaniam
- Starring: Thikkurissy Sukumaran Nair; Miss Kumari; Master Hari; G. K. Pillai; Jose Prakash; T. S. Muthiah
- Cinematography: N. S.Mani
- Music by: Br Lakshmanan
- Production company: Neela Productions
- Distributed by: The Film Distributing Corporation
- Release date: 19 March 1955
- Country: India
- Language: Malayalam

Harishchandra is a 1955 Malayalam film produced by P. Subramaniam and directed by Anthony Mithradas. The film was based on the legend of King Harishchandra, recounted in the Ramayana and the Mahabharata. Starring Thikkurissy Sukumaran Nair, Miss Kumari, Master Hari, G. K. Pillai, Jose Prakash and T. S. Muthiah in major roles, it features cinematography by N. S. Mani and music by Brother Lakshmanan.

Harishchandra was heavily inspired by Raja Harishchandra (1913, Hindi), which was the first film adaptation of the legend. The film also borrows inspiration from Satya Harishchandra (1943, Kannada) as well as Harishchandra (1945, Tamil). Several scenes from these movies were directly reused in Harishchandra.

It was the first Malayalam film to be shot outdoors. Previous films were filmed from studios or indoor units. However, a few parts of the film was shot from Merryland Studios. The film was marketed well before its release and the songs were aired continuously in radio channels. P. Subrahmaniam could attract people through the content and theme of the film, which was new for Malayalam films. The film released on 19 March 1955 in Kerala theatres. It was a big box office success and paved the way for many films in this genre.

The music was composed by Brother Lakshmanan with lyrics by Thirunainar Kurichi. The film had 15 songs including "Aathmavidyalame", sung by Kamukara Purushothaman, which is considered a classic. The lyrics and the sequence of this song is inspired by the famous Grave Diggers scene in Shakespeare's Hamlet. P. B. Sreenivas debuted as a playback singer through this film.

== Cast ==
- Thikkurissy Sukumaran Nair as Harishchandra
- Miss Kumari as Chandramathi
- Master Hari as Lohithaksha
- G. K. Pillai as Vishvamitran
- Jose Prakash as Sathyakeerthi (Minister)
- T. S. Muthaiah as Shukran (Vishvamitra's helper)
- S. P. Pillai as Kalakantan
- Adoor Pankajam as Kalakanta's wife
- Kanakajam & Malayajam as dancers
