= Avakasi =

- Directed by: Antony Mitradas
- Written by: K. P. Kottarakkara
- Screenplay by: K. .P Kottarakkara
- Produced by: P. Subramaniam
- Starring: Prem Nazir>br> Miss Kumari
- Cinematography: N. S. Mani
- Edited by: K. D. George
- Music by: Br. Lakshmanan
- Production company: Neela
- Release date: 19 March 1954
- Country: India
- Language: Malayalam

Avakasi is a 1954 Indian Malayalam-language film, directed by Antony Mitradas and produced by P. Subramaniam. The film stars Prem Nazir and Miss Kumari. It features a musical score by Br. Lakshmanan.

This film was dubbed into Tamil as Avan Yaar and released the same year. Kambadasan wrote the screenplay and lyrics.

== Cast ==
- Prem Nazir as Vijayan
- Pankajavalli as Madhavi
- S. P. Pillai as Marthandan
- Miss Kumari as Kumari
- Adoor Pankajam as Sheelavathi
- Nanukkuttan as Thrivikraman Thampi
- Kottarakkara Sreedharan Nair as Prathapan
- Ambalappuzha Rajamma as Paarvathi
- Ambalappuzha Meenakshi
- T. S. Muthaiah as Kurup
- Soman as Rudran
- Sreekantan Nair
- Muthukulam Raghavan Pilla as Manmadan
- Sethulakshmi (Old artist)
- Bahadoor
