= Sheriyo Thetto =

1951 Malayalam movie

- Directed by: Thikkurissy Sukumaran Nair; V. A. Reynolds
- Written by: Thikkurissy Sukumaran Nair
- Produced by: Mangala Pictures, Kottayam.
- Edited by: S. Williams
- Music by: V. Dakshinamoorthy
- Production company: Udaya Studios
- Distributed by: S. T. Reddiar & Sons, Alleppy.
- Release date: 5 September 1953
- Country: India
- Language: Malayalam

Sheriyo Thetto is a Malayalam-language film released in 1953 under the production of Mangala Pictures. The film was written and directed by Thikkurissy in his directorial debut. Though the movie was not a commercial success it was noted for its camera work and editing. It is also the debut film of actors Adoor Bhavani, Meena Sulochana, and Jose Prakash, and dance director N. Damodaran. The camera work is done by M. R. Ranganathan and the dances were choreographed by Ramunni as well as N. Damodaran.

== Plot ==
The story revolves around Appu (Thikkurissi) and his family. Appu is employed as a lorry driver in his hometown. He has completed his military services.

== Soundtracks ==
There are 14 songs written by Thikkurissi, with music by V. Dakshinamoorthy.

Song title	Singer(s)
"Kamala Lochana Kanna"	Meena Sulochana
"Paadu Pettu Paadangalil"	Jose Prakash
"Vaarmazhaville Vaa"	Jose Prakash, P. Leela
"Prathikara Chintha"	Kuttappa Bhagavathar, Vijayalakshmi

== Cast ==
- Thikkurissy Sukumaran Nair as Appu
- Sebastian Kunjukunju Bhagavathar
- S. P. Pillai
- Miss Kumari
- Sethulakshmi
- Adoor Pankajam
- T. R. Omana
- Adoor Bhavani
- Jose Prakash
- Meena Sulochana

== Reception ==
The film was not a box office hit and could not impress the audience which made the movie a commercial failure.
