= Jailppulli =

- Poster
- Directed by: P. Subramaniam
- Written by: Muttathu Varkey
- Produced by: P. Subramaniam
- Starring: Prem Nazir; Miss Kumari; K. V. Shanthi
- Edited by: K. D. George
- Music by: Br Lakshmanan
- Production company: Neela Productions
- Release date: 3 October 1957
- Country: India
- Language: Malayalam

Jailppulli (Victory Point) is a 1957 Indian Malayalam-language crime thriller film, directed and produced by P. Subramaniam. The film stars Prem Nazir and Miss Kumari. It was released on 3 October 1957.

== Cast ==
- Prem Nazir as Gopi/Ravi
- Miss Kumari as Shantha
- Kottarakkara Sreedharan Nair as Madhu
- T. S. Muthaiah as Shekharan
- K. V. Shanthi as Prema
- Bahadoor as Muthu
- Kumari Thankam as Sudha
- S. P. Pillai as Jambulingam
- Kottayam Santha as Lakshmi

== Soundtrack ==
The film had musical score by Br Lakshmanan with lyrics penned by Thirunayinaarkurichi Madhavan Nair. The song "Njaan Ariyathen" is based on "Brindavanamadi Andaridi Govindudu Andarivadele" from the Telugu film Missamma (1955).
