= Amma (1952 film) =

- Poster
- Directed by: Jairus Paul Victor
- Written by: Nagavally R. S. Kurup
- Produced by: T. E. Vasudevan
- Starring: Thikkurissy Sukumaran Nair; Lalitha; B. S. Saroja; Aranmula Ponnamma; M. N. Nambiar; T. S. Durairaj; P. M. Devan; Gopalan Nair; T. S. Muthaiah; Sharma; Paul Vengola
- Cinematography: V. Rajagopal
- Edited by: R. Rajagopal
- Music by: V. Dakshinamurthy
- Production company: Associated Producers
- Release date: 6 December 1952
- Country: India
- Languages: Malayalam; Tamil
- Budget: ₹10 lakh

Amma (transl. Mother) is a 1952 Indian Malayalam-language film directed by Jairus Paul Victor, written by Nagavally R. S. Kurup and produced by T. E. Vasudevan. The film is based on L. V. Prasad's Telugu movie Shavukar.

The film was a moderate success at the box office. It was one of only two films that enjoyed success among the 11 Malayalam films released in 1952, the other being the Prem Nazir-starrer Visappinte Vili.

The film was simultaneously made in Tamil with the same title; Amma. Sandilyan wrote the dialogues.

== Cast ==
Male cast

- Thikkurissy Sukumaran Nair
- M. N. Nambiar
- T. S. Durairaj
- P. M. Devan
- Gopalan Nair
- T. S. Muthaiah
- Sharma

Female cast

- B. S. Saroja
- Lalitha
- Aranmula Ponnamma
- P. Shanthakumari

== Soundtrack ==
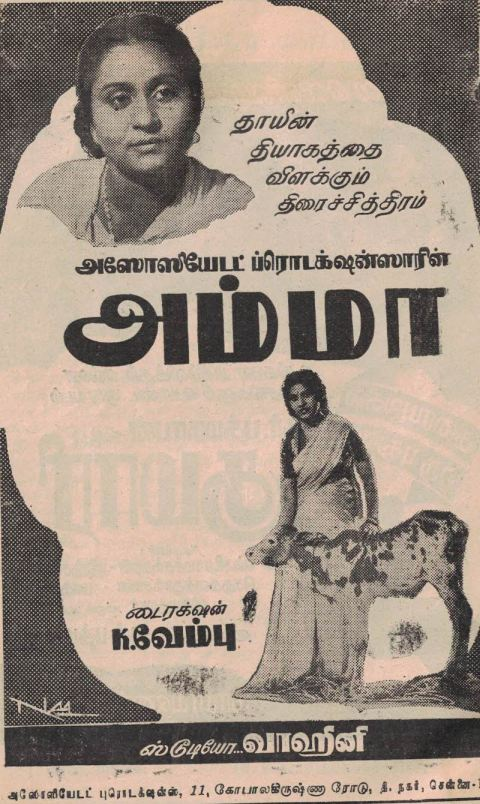
Poster of the Tamil version

Music was composed by V. Dakshinamurthy for both Malayalam and Tamil editions.

Malayalam

There were 14 songs in the film and many were hits. Lyrics were penned by P. Bhaskaran. Playback singers were V. Dakshinamurthy (debut), Gokulapalan (debut), Ghantasala (debut in Malayalam), Balakrishnan (AIR artiste) and P. Leela.

Tamil

Lyrics were penned by Chidambaram Varadarajan. One song by Mahakavi Bharathiyar was also included in the film.

"Ammaave Deivam Ulaginile", sung by Jikki and "Idhai Yaarodum Sollavum Koodaadhu", sung by T. A. Mothi and Janamma were hits.

Song	Singer/s	Lyricist
"Jayamundu Bayamillai Maname"	P. Leela	Mahakavi Bharathiyar
"Vedhanaiyaal Kann Kalangkida"	P. Leela	Chidambaram Varadarajan
"Ammaave Deivam Ulaginile"	Jikki	Chidambaram Varadarajan
"Anaivarumae Varuveer"	Lalitha & group	Chidambaram Varadarajan
"Padagae Namadhu Thunaiye"	V. Dakshinamurthy, P. Leela & group	Chidambaram Varadarajan
"Aandavan Padaipilae"	V. Dakshinamurthy & P. Leela	Chidambaram Varadarajan
"Nal Thiruvonam Varudhe"	V. Dakshinamurthy & P. Leela	Chidambaram Varadarajan
"Vidhiyo Paingkili"	Thiruchi Loganathan	Chidambaram Varadarajan
"Udamaiyum Varumaiyum"	Ghantasala	Chidambaram Varadarajan
"Rohttu Maele Motaaru"		Chidambaram Varadarajan
"Varuvaai Aasai Kiliye"	Gokulapalan & Jikki	Chidambaram Varadarajan
"Vaazhvilum Thaazhvilum Maathaave"		Chidambaram Varadarajan
"Varuga Varuga Yen Sodharikarl"	Lalitha	Chidambaram Varadarajan
"Idhai Yaarodum Sollavum"	T. A. Mothi & Jaanamma	Chidambaram Varadarajan

== Reception ==
Both Malayalam and Tamil editions of the film fared well at the box office. The film is remembered for the outstanding acting by Aranmula Ponnamma. The film will also be remembered for the debut of Gokulapalan and Dakshinamoorthy as playback singers.
