= Christmas Rathri =

- Directed by: P. Subramaniam
- Written by: Muttathu Varkey
- Screenplay by: T. N. Gopinathan Nair
- Produced by: P. Subramaniam
- Starring: T. K. Balachandran; Thikkurissy Sukumaran Nair; Miss Kumari; M. G. Soman; Adoor Pankajam
- Cinematography: N. S. Mani
- Edited by: K. D. George
- Music by: Br. Lakshmanan
- Production company: Neela Productions
- Release date: 28 January 1961
- Country: India
- Language: Malayalam

Christmas Rathri (transl. Christmas Night) is a 1961 Indian Malayalam-language social drama film, directed and produced by P. Subramaniam and was filmed at Merryland Studio. The film stars T. K. Balachandran, Thikkurissy Sukumaran Nair, Miss Kumari, M. G. Soman and Adoor Pankajam. The film had musical score by Br. Lakshmanan.

The plot revolves around Advocate George (Thikkurissi) and his wife Annie (Miss Kumari). George mistakenly suspects his wife of having an affair with Dr. Mathews (T. K. Balachandran). Despite its title, the film has very little to do with Christmas, except that the climax of the film occurs on Christmas Eve. The film was also made in Tamil as Yar Manamagan? and released on 22 September 1961.

== Cast ==
- T. K. Balachandran as Dr. Mathews
- Thikkurissy Sukumaran Nair as George
- M. G. Soman
- Adoor Pankajam as Mariya
- Aranmula Ponnamma as Annamma
- Ambika Sukumaran as Gracy
- Bahadoor as Kurian
- Kannamma
- Kottarakkara Sreedharan Nair as Valyedathu Vareechan
- Miss Kumari as Annie
- N. Govindankutty as Philip
- Pankajavalli as Thresiamma
- Paravoor Bharathan as Porinchu
- S. P. Pillai as Thoma
- Benjamin F.

== Soundtrack ==
The music was composed by Br. Lakshmanan and the lyrics were written by P. Bhaskaran.

No.	Song	Singers	Lyrics	Length (m:ss)
1	"Aattummanammele" (Unniyarcha Naadakam)	P. Leela, Kamukara, A. P. Komala	P. Bhaskaran	
2	"Appozhe Njan"	Kamukara, A. P. Komala	P. Bhaskaran	
3	"Enthininiyum"	P. B. Sreenivas	P. Bhaskaran	
4	"Kanmani Karayalle"	P. Leela	P. Bhaskaran	
5	"Karinkaaru Nerthallo"	Kamukara	P. Bhaskaran	
6	"Kinaavinte"	A. P. Komala	P. Bhaskaran	
7	"Lelam Kale"	A. P. Komala	P. Bhaskaran	
8	"Mishihaanaadhan"	T. S. Kumaresh	P. Bhaskaran	
9	"Nanmaniranjoramme"	P. Leela	P. Bhaskaran	
10	"Varanondu Laathi"	T. S. Kumaresh	P. Bhaskaran	
11	"Vinnil Ninnum"	P. Leela, Chorus	P. Bhaskaran	

== See also ==
- List of Christmas films
