= Nalla Thanka =

- Directed by: P. V. Krishna Iyer
- Written by: Muthukulam Raghavan Pillai
- Produced by: Kunchacko; R. A. Krishnan; K. V. Koshy
- Starring: Augustine Joseph; Vaikom Mani; Miss Kumari; Miss Omana; S. P. Pillai
- Cinematography: A. Shanmugham; P. K. Madhavan Nair
- Edited by: S. Williams
- Music by: V. Dakshinamoorthy
- Production companies: K & K Combines; Udaya Studios
- Release date: 1950
- Country: India
- Language: Malayalam

Nalla Thanka is a 1950 Indian Malayalam-language mythological film directed by P. V. Krishna Iyer and produced by K. V. Koshy and Kunchacko under the banner of Udaya Studios and K & K Combines. It was the second film produced at the Udaya Studios, the first being Vellinakshatram (1949). The film stars Miss Kumari in the title role along with Augustine Joseph, Vaikom Mani and Miss Omana in supporting roles. The film is based on the legend of Nalla Thanka, which is based on a popular Tamil folk tale.

== Cast ==
Principal cast

- Miss Kumari as Nalla Thanka, Queen of Ratnapuri and Nallannan's sister
- Augustine Joseph as Nallannan, the King of Madhurapuri
- Vaikom Mani as Somanathan, the King of Ratnapuri and Nalla Thanka's husband
- Miss Omana as Alankari, Queen of Madhurapuri and Nallannan's wife
- Baby Girija as one of Nalla Thanka's children
- S. P. Pillai
- TR Omana
- Muthukulam Raghavan Pillai as Lord Shiva

== Production ==
=== Development ===
The success of Tamil operas based on the folk tale of Nalla Thanka in Kerala prompted Vaidyaratnam P. S. Varier to script a Malayalam drama based on the same story. He then authored the musical opera Nalla Thanka, for the drama troupe Kottakkal Paramasiva Vilasam. The drama became very popular in Kerala.

After the failure of their first feature film Vellinakshatram (1949), K. V. Koshy and Kunchacko were in deep debt. They decided to produce another feature film to recoup their losses. They decided to adopt the drama into a film as it was already popular and was a guaranteed success. Kunchacko mortgaged all his land and sold the family's jewellery to complete the film. The screenplay and dialogues were written by Muthukulam Raghavan Pillai. The screenplay followed the stage play with just a few minor changes. The film was shot in Udaya Studios. A. Shanmugham and P. K. Madhavan Nair were the cinematographers, V. Dakshinamoorthy was the composer and the film was edited by S. Williams.

=== Casting ===
Thresiamma (Miss Kumari) had earlier done a dance in Udaya's first film Vellinakshatram. Struck by her appearance and screen presence Kunchacko and Koshy cast her in the title role. She was rechristened Miss Kumari on the sets of the film. Augustine Joseph, the founder of the Udaya Kerala Natana Kala Samithi was asked to play the main lead. He had already established himself as a matinee idol in Kerala through his music operas based on Biblical and Mythological stories. Vaikom Mani had previously acted in various Tamil films. Kunchacko cast him due to his popularity in Tamil Nadu.

== Soundtrack ==
The soundtrack consists of a total of 15 songs. The film score and all the songs were composed by V. Dakshinamoorthy, with lyrics from Abhayadev.

Song	Singer(s)	Raga(s)
"Rathnam Vithachaal"	P. Leela, Janamma David	
"Mahesha Maayamo"	Augustine Joseph	
"Pathiye Daivam"	Mrs Kuruvilla	
"Sodara Bandhamathonne"	P. Leela, Vaikkom Mani	
"Imbamerum Ithalaakum"	Augustine Joseph	
"Manoharamee Raajyam"	P. Leela	
"Shambho Shambho Shivane"	Vaikkom Mani	
"Kripaalo Valsaraakum"	P. Leela	
"Ammathan Prema Soubhaagya"	P. Leela	
"Shambho Njan"	P. Leela	

== Reception ==
Nalla Thanka was released on 14 January 1950. The film was a major success both at the box-office and with the critics. It was Udaya Studio's breakthrough and was one of the earliest commercially successful films in Malayalam cinema. According to Ashish Rajadhyaksha and Paul Willemen in the book Encyclopedia of Indian Cinema, Nalla Thanka was the first "big hit" in Malayalam cinema. In 2010, B. Vijayakumar of The Hindu wrote that: "The performances of Augustine Joseph, Vaikom Mani, Miss Kumari and Miss Oamana were impressive. In fact, Miss Omana's character became so popular that the name Alankari became a synonym for a wicked woman. The special effect scenes was another highlight." Concluding he wrote, "Will be remembered as the first mega hit in Malayalam cinema and for its good music." The film was remade in Tamil in 1955 as Nalla Thangal.
