= Balyasakhi =

- Directed by: Antony Mitradas
- Written by: K. P. Kottarakkara
- Screenplay by: K. P. Kottarakkara
- Produced by: P. Subramaniam
- Starring: Prem Nazir; Miss Kumari
- Cinematography: N. S. Mani
- Edited by: K. D. George
- Music by: Br. Lakshmanan
- Production company: Neela
- Release date: 19 March 1954
- Country: India
- Language: Malayalam

Balyasakhi is a 1954 Indian Malayalam-language film, directed by Antony Mitradas and produced by P. Subramaniam. The film stars Prem Nazir and Miss Kumari. The film had musical score by Br. Lakshmanan and lyrics were written by Thirunainarkurichy Madhavan Nair.

== Cast ==
- Prem Nazir as Vijayan
- Kumari Thankam
- S. P. Pillai
- Miss Kumari
- Vanchiyoor Madhavan Nair
- Jose Prakash
- Sebastian Kunjukunju Bhagavathar
- T. S. Muthaiah
- Adoor Pankajam
- Aranmula Ponnamma
- Baby Indira
- Bahadoor
- Master Hari
- Veeran
- Snehalatha
- Saraswathi
