= Alphonsa (film) =

- Directed by: O. J. Thottan
- Written by: O. J. Thottan
- Screenplay by: O. J. Thottan
- Produced by: N. X. George
- Starring: Jose Prakash, Miss Kumari
- Cinematography: O. J. Thottan
- Edited by: N. M. Sankar
- Music by: T. R. Pappa
- Production company: Jeo Productions
- Release date: 5 December 1952
- Country: India
- Language: Malayalam

Alphonsa is a 1952 Indian Malayalam-language film, directed by O. J. Thottan and produced by N. X. George. The film stars Jose Prakash and Miss Kumari. The film had musical score by T. R. Pappa.

== Cast ==
- Jose Prakash
- Miss Kumari
- E. C. Jacob
- Surendranath R.
- Rose
- Kamalakshi
- T. M. Abraham
- Ansalees
- C. R. Lakshmi
- P. K. Mohan

== Songs ==
1. "Aadithya Prabha"
2. "Allalamallinte"
3. "Alphonse Alphonse"
4. "Bhaava Jeevikalkkaaswaasa" - Nagayya
5. "Kaniyoo Dayaanidhe"
6. "Kelkuka Ha" - Jose Prakash
7. "Maanasaveena" - P. Leela, Mothi
8. "Nanma Niranjoramme"
9. Prema Jeevitha Malarvaadi"
10. "Thaaramaarum Aarum Chernna" - Janamma David
11. "Varumo Varumo" - A. P. Komala, Mothi
