= Sandehi =

- Directed by: F. Nagoor
- Written by: F. Nagoor
- Screenplay by: N. N. Pisharady
- Produced by: F. Nagoor
- Starring: Muthukulam Raghavan Pillai, T. R. Omana
- Cinematography: E. Kumaradevan
- Edited by: G. Viswanath
- Music by: T. R. Pappa
- Production company: Nagoor Cine Productions
- Release date: 20 August 1954
- Country: India
- Language: Malayalam

Sandehi is a 1954 Indian Malayalam-language film, directed and produced by F. Nagoor. The film stars Muthukulam Raghavan Pillai and T. R. Omana. The film had musical score by T. R. Pappa.

== Cast ==
- S. P. Pillai
- Muthukulam Raghavan Pilla
- T. R. Omana
- Santhadevi
- M. G. Chakrapani
- Neyyaattinkara Komalam
