= Aana Valarthiya Vanampadi =

1959 film directed by P. Subramaniam

- Title card
- Directed by: P. Subramaniam
- Written by: Neela
- Screenplay by: Thikkurissy Sukumaran Nair
- Produced by: P. Subramaniam
- Starring: Thikkurissi, S.P.Pillai, Bahadoor, Miss Kumari etc
- Cinematography: E. N. C. Nair
- Edited by: K. D. George
- Music by: Br Lakshmanan
- Production company: Neela
- Distributed by: Kumaraswamy & Co.
- Release date: 11 September 1959
- Country: India
- Language: Malayalam

Aana Valarthiya Vanampadi is a 1959 Indian Malayalam-language film directed and produced by P. Subramaniam. The film stars Thikkurissi, S. P. Pillai, Bahadoor, M. N. Nambiar, and Miss Kumari in a daul role.

The film was released in Tamil on 27 November 1959, titled Yaanai Valartha Vaanambadi. Somasundaram wrote the dialogues. A sequel, titled Aana Valarthiya Vanampadiyude Makan, was released in 1971.

== Cast ==
- Thikkurissy Sukumaran Nair as Lakshmi's husband
- Bahadoor as Azhakan
- Friend Ramaswamy as Mani
- MN Nambiar as Kandappan
- Miss Kumari as Lakshmi, Malli/Meena (double role)
- SD Subbalakshmi as Thankamani
- SP Pillai as Idea Annan thampi
- K. V. Shanthi as Mohana
- Sreeram as Sekhar

== Soundtrack ==
Malayalam songs

The music was composed by Br Lakshmanan, and the lyrics were penned by Thirunayinaarkurichi Madhavan Nair.

Song	Singer/s	Duration (mm:ss)
"Kanne Varna"	A. M. Rajah	03:20
"Avaniyil Thaano Njan Akappeduvaano"	P. B. Sreenivas & K. Jamuna Rani	02:59
"Kaananame"	P. Leela	03:38
"Paimpaalozhukum"	A. M. Rajah & P. Leela	03:35
"Zimboho Zimbahai"	P. B. Sreenivas, K. Jamuna Rani & group	06:24
"Om Maha Kaali.... Koottukkulle"	K. Jamuna Rani & group	02:53
"Jodiyulla Kaale"	P. B. Sreenivas	02:52

Tamil songs

Song	Singer/s	Lyricist	Duration (mm:ss)
"Kanne Vanna Pasungkiliye"	Sirkazhi Govindarajan	Ku. Ma. Balasubramaniam	03:20
"Avasaram Thaano, Naan Agapaduveno"	Jikki	Ku. Ma. Balasubramaniam	02:59
"Kaanagame Engal Thaayagame"	P. Leela	Surabhi	03:38
"Pann Paadi Varum Odai Neeril"	A. M. Rajah & P. Leela	Surabhi	03:35
"Zimboho Zimbahai"	P. B. Sreenivas, K. Jamuna Rani & group	Kambadasan	06:24
"Om Maha Kaali.... Koottukkulle"	K. Jamuna Rani & group	Kambadasan	02:53
"Jodi Kaalai Maade Neeye"	Thiruchi Loganathan	Kambadasan	02:52
