= Chechi (film) =

- Directed by: T. Janakiram
- Written by: N. P. Chellappan Nair
- Screenplay by: N. P. Chellappan Nair
- Produced by: Swami Narayanan
- Starring: Kottarakkara Sreedharan Nair; Miss Kumari
- Edited by: P. G. Mohan
- Music by: G. K. Venkatesh
- Release date: 15 February 1950
- Country: India
- Language: Malayalam

Chechi is a 1950 Indian Malayalam-language film, directed by T. Janaki Ram and produced by Swami Narayanan. The film stars Kottarakkara Sreedharan Nair and Miss Kumari in lead roles. The film was dubbed into Tamil with the title Nadigai and was released in 1951. It is the debut film of music director G. K. Venkatesh, playback singer T. A. Lakshmi and director T. Janakiram. It is known for the classical-based song "Kalitha Kalamaya Kailasavasa".

== Cast ==
- Kottarakkara Sreedharan Nair
- Miss Kumari
- Aranmula Ponnamma
- T. R. Omana
- Cherthala Vasudeva Kurup
- S. A. Hameed
- S. P. Pillai
- Vaikkom Raju

== Soundtrack ==
- "Aasha Thakarukayo" - Kalinga Rao, Kaviyoor CK Revamma
- "Kalitha Kalaamaya" - Kaviyoor CK Revamma
- "Varika Varika" - G.K. Venkitesh, Kaviyoor
- "Varumo En" - T.A. Lakshmi
- "Athi Dooreyirunnu" - N/A
- "Oh Ponnushassa" - Mohanakumari
- "Oru Vichaaram" - Kalinga Rao, Mohanakumari
- "Chirakaala Manobhaavam" - Kalinga Rao, Mohanakumari
- "Nee Maathraminnu" - Mohanakumari
- "Chudu Chintha Than" - Kalinga Rao, Mohanakumari
- "Vaasavathi" - V.N. Rajan
