= Premalekha =

- Directed by: M. K. Ramani
- Written by: Vanakkutty
- Screenplay by: Vanakkutty
- Starring: Jose Prakash, S. P. Pillai
- Music by: P. S. Divakar
- Production company: Aravind Productions
- Release date: 25 July 1952
- Country: India
- Language: Malayalam

Premalekha is a 1952 Indian Malayalam-language film, directed by M. K. Ramani. The film stars Jose Prakash and S. P. Pillai. The film's score was composed by P. S. Divakar.

== Cast ==
- Jose Prakash
- S. P. Pillai
- Omalloor Chellamma
- Adoor Pankajam
- Ambalappuzha Meenakshi
- S. R. Pallatt
- Chitoor Madhavankutty Menon
- V D Mathew
- Vanakkutty
