= Aathmaarpanam =

- Directed by: G. R. Rao
- Written by: K. P. Kottarakkara
- Screenplay by: K. P. Kottarakkara
- Starring: Prem Nazir; B. S. Saroja
- Cinematography: Balasubramaniam
- Edited by: M. K. Ramani
- Music by: V. Dakshinamoorthy
- Production company: Merryland
- Release date: 23 March 1956
- Country: India
- Language: Malayalam

Aathmaarpanam is a 1956 Indian Malayalam-language film, directed by G. R. Rao. The film stars Prem Nazir and B. S. Saroja. The film had musical score by V. Dakshinamoorthy. The popular song "Kunkuma Chaaraninju" is from this movie.

== Cast ==
- Prem Nazir
- B. S. Saroja
- Thikkurissy Sukumaran Nair
- T. S. Muthaiah
- Ali Khan
- Bahadoor
- Damodaran
- Husain Khan
- Kottarakkara Sreedharan Nair
- Kuttan Pillai
- Masood
- Muttathara Soman
- N. R. Thankam
- S. P. Pillai
- S. S. Anandan
- Sreedharan
- Vijayam
