= Miss Kumari =

Indian actress

- Born: Thresiamma Thomas; 1 June 1932; Bharananganam, Travancore, British India
- Died: 9 June 1969 (aged 37)
- Occupation: Actress
- Years active: 1949–1969
- Spouse: Hormis Thaliath
- Children: 3
- Website: https://misskumari.com/

Miss Kumari (1932–1969), born Thresiamma Thomas, was an Indian actress active in the Malayalam film industry between 1949 and 1969. In the '50s and early '60s she was the most prominent female lead in the Malayalam film industry. She briefly worked as a teacher before she made her film debut in the 1949 film Vellinakshatram. She took on the stage name Miss Kumari on the sets of her second film, Nalla Thanka.

Miss Kumari is noted for her performance in films such as Sasidharan (1950), Chechi (1950), Yachakan (1951), Navalokam (1951), Aathmasakhi (1952), Alphonsa (1952), Sheriyo Thetto (1953), Avakaasi (1954), Neelakuyil (1954), C.I.D. (1955), Padatha Paingili (1957), Randidangazhi (1958), Mudiyanaya Puthran (1961), Aana Valarthiya Vanampadi (1961) and Pattaabhishekam (1962). Miss Kumari has, in her career spanning 18 years done, 34 films.

Miss Kumari has won two Madras State Award for Best Actress for her performances in Aniyathi (1955) and Aana Valarthiya Vanampadi (1961). Her film Neelakuyil (1954) was the first Malayalam film to win the All India Certificate of Merit for Best Feature Film and is now regarded as a landmark film in the history of Malayalam cinema, It was Miss Kumari's breakthrough and the most memorable film in her career. Another film, Padatha Paingili (1957) won the President's Silver Medal, being the second Malayalam film to do so.

== Early life ==
Miss Kumari, born Thresiamma on 1 June 1932, was the daughter of Thomas and Eliyamma. She was born in Bharananganam, in the district of Kottayam, then part of Travancore in British India—a region that later became incorporated into the present-day state of Kerala.

She received her primary education at Sacred Hearts High School in Bharananganam, an all-girls institution administered by the Franciscan Clarist Congregation. Upon completing her studies, she was employed for a short period as a teacher at the same school.

== Career ==
=== 1949 - 54 ===
Thresiamma debuted in Malayalam with the 1949 film Vellinakshatram, the first production of Udaya Studios and the 7th Malayalam feature film. Unfortunately, the film was a commercial failure. But, impressed with her screen presence in the film Udaya Studios launches her as the main lead in their next film, Nalla Thanka. It was in this film she took on the stage name Miss Kumari. Nalla Thanka was a huge success at the box office, establishing herself as a leading actress in the industry. After the success of Nalla Thanka, she starred in a series of films like Sasidharan (1950), Chechi (1950), Yachakan (1951), Navalokam (1951), Aathmasakhi (1952), Alphonsa (1952), Aatmashaanthi (1952), Sheriyo Thetto (1953) and Avakaasi (1954). However, her fame reached a fever pitch in 1954 with the release of Neelakuyil, where she starred alongside Sathyan. Neelakuyil was a huge success at the box office and wins the President's Silver Medal and marks the first time this honor had been bestowed on a South Indian film. It is now regarded a landmark film in Malayalam film history.

== Personal life ==
In 1963, Miss Kumari married Hormis Thaliath, an engineer at F.A.C.T Kochi. She immediately retired from the industry to focus on family life. The couple has three children: Johnny, Thomas, and Babu. Johnny is in the finance business, Thomas is a Computer Engineer in California and Babu is a Professor in the Centre of German Studies at Jawaharlal Nehru University (JNU), New Delhi. She died from complications of stomach ailments on 9 June 1969 at the age of 37. The burial took place in Bharananganam, her native place. Miss Kumari Memorial Stadium was built in Bharananganam, which was inaugurated by veteran actor Prem Nazir.

== Filmography ==
Year	Title	Role	Notes
1949	Vellinakshatram		Film debut
1950	Sasidharan	Vilasini, daughter of Kalyaniyamma	
1950	Nalla Thanka	Nalla Thanka	
1950	Chechi	Radhika; a stage actress	
1951	Yachakan	Sathi the daughter of Raghu Raman	
1951	Navalokam	Devaki	
1952	Kanchana	Doctor Seetha	Tamil debut
1952	Aathmasakhi	Nirmala	
1952	Alphonsa		
1953	Sheriyo Thetto	Geetha	
1954	Neelakuyil	Neeli	
1954	Kidappadam	Kalyani, wife of Sankaran	
1954	Balyasakhi	Lakshmi	
1954	Avakashi	Kumari	
1955	Harishchandra	Chandramathi	
1955	C.I.D	Vasanthi, daughter of Mukunda Menon	
1955	Aniyathi	Ammini	Won the Madras State Award For Best Actress
1956	Manthravadi	Rajkumari Mallika	
1956	Koodappirappu		
1956	Avar Unarunnu		
1957	Padatha Paingili	Chinnamma	
1957	Jailppulli	Santha	
1958	Randidangazhi	Chirutha	
1958	Mariakutty	Mariakutty	
1959	Aana Valarthiya Vanampadi	Lakshmi, wife of Selvapathi / Malli, daughter of Lakshmi and Selvapathi	Won the Madras State Award For Best Actress
1960	Petraval Kanda Peruvazhvu		Tamil
1961	Mudiyanaya Puthran	Chellamma	
1961	Christmas Rathri	Annie	
1961	Bhakta Kuchela	Suseela	
1962	Dakshayagnam		
1962	Snehadeepam	Lakshmi	
1962	Sreerama Pattabhishekam	Kaikeyi	
1963	Susheela	Susheela, daughter of Madhavi Amma	
1963	Snapaka Yohannan	Miriam	
1967	Kaanatha Veshangal		
1967	Arakkillam	Soosi	Final film role
