= S. P. Pillai =

Indian actor

- Born: S. Pankajakshan Pillai; 28 November 1913; Ettumanoor, Travancore, British India
- Died: 12 June 1985 (aged 71); Ettumanoor, Kottayam district, India
- Years active: 1940–1973

S. P. Pillai (28 November 1913 – 12 June 1985) was an Indian film and stage actor, best known for his comic roles in Malayalam films.

== Biography ==
S. Pankajakshan Pillai alias S. P. Pillai was born in 1913 in the temple town of Ettumanoor in Kottayam district. His father Shankara Pillai, was a police constable. Pillai lost his parents at a young age. He could not afford basic education but obtained training in Ottan Thullal from Kalamandalam for a few years. He started his career as a supporting actor in stage plays. His first film, Appan Thamburan's Bhootharayar, did not release. His first released film was Jnanambika (1940). He shot to fame as a comedy actor after the superhit film Nalla Thanka (1951). He did notable roles in more than 300 films, including Snehaseema, Nayaru pidichapulivalu, Chemmen, Bharya, Vidarunna Mottukal. He played the role of Paananar in almost all the Vadakkan Pattu films of Udaya. He has even sung the song Vayaranu Nammalkku Daivam for the movie Thaskaraveeran, in 1957. Sanchari (1981) was his last film. He won the Kerala State Film Award for Second Best Actor for his performance in Taxi Driver. He died on 12 June 1985. Actress Manju Pillai is his granddaughter.

== Awards ==
Kerala State Film Awards:

- Second Best Actor – 1977 – Taxi Driver
- He was also honoured with the Kalaratnam Award by the Travancore Devaswom Board
- Mayoora Award. Okay

== Filmography ==
=== As an actor ===
==== 1950s ====
Year	Title	Role	Notes
1950	Nalla Thanka		
1950	Chandrika		
1950	Sasidharan	Maniyan	
1950	Chechi		
1951	Jeevitha Nouka	Shanku, Janu's brother	
1951	Yachakan		
1951	Vanamala		
1952	Achan	Mathu	
1952	Premalekha		
1952	Visappinte Vili		
1952	Aathmasanthi		
1953	Genova		
1953	Velakkaran		
1953	Sheriyo Thetto		
1953	Lokaneethi		
1953	Ponkathir	Pappan	
1954	Sandehi		
1954	Snehaseema	Paili	
1954	Balyasakhi	Pankan	
1954	Avakashi	Marthandan	
1954	Avan Varunnu		
1955	Aniyathi	S. P.	
1955	C.I.D.	Pichu & Vava	
1955	Harishchandra	Kalakantan	
1956	Aathmaarpanam		
1956	Manthravadi	Mayadasan	
1957	Deva Sundari		
1957	Jailppulli	Jambulingam	
1957	Thaskaraveeran	Pappu Pilla	
1957	Achanum Makanum	Forest Officer	
1957	Padatha Painkili	Mayilan	
1958	Mariakutty	Naanu	
1958	Nairu Pidicha Pulivalu	Chanthukutty	
1958	Lilly		
1959	Aana Valarthiya Vanampadi	Idea Annan thampi	

==== 1960s ====
Year	Title	Role	Notes
1960	Poothali		
1960	Umma	Vattathil Kurup	
1961	Bhakta Kuchela		
1961	Arappavan	Raphael Mappila	
1961	Sabarimala Ayappan		
1961	Kandam Becha Kottu	Minnal Moideen	
1961	Ummini Thanka		
1961	Jnaanasundari	Antony	
1961	Christmas Rathri	Thoma	
1962	Puthiya Akasam Puthiya Bhoomi	Mammutty	
1962	Palattu Koman	Pankan	
1962	Snehadeepam	Njaramban/Karnan	
1962	Sreekovil		
1962	Kannum Karalum		
1962	Bharya	Uthuppu	
1963	Snapaka Yohannan	Samuel	
1963	Kadalamma	Ramabhadran	
1963	Kalayum Kaminiyum		
1963	Ninamaninja Kalpadukal	Bomb Kunjooju	
1963	Ammaye Kaanaan	Sankunni Nair	
1963	Doctor	Keshavan	
1963	Chilamboli		
1964	Oral Koodi Kallanayi	Kammathi	
1964	School Master	Kuttan Pilla	
1964	Manavatty		
1964	Thacholi Othenan	Chandu	
1964	Omanakuttan		
1964	Aadyakiranangal	Avaran	
1964	Althaara		
1964	Atom Bomb	Kuttan Karanavar	
1964	Anna		
1964	Karutha Kai	Damu	
1964	Devaalayam		
1964	Sree Guruvayoorappan	Panamaran	
1964	Ore Bhoomi Ore Raktham		
1965	Pattuthoovaala	Philip	
1965	Kavyamela	Swami	
1965	Kaliyodam	Kittu pilla	
1965	Murappennu		
1965	Mayavi	Kaimani	
1965	Muthalali	Paramu	
1965	Chemmeen	Achankunju	
1965	Inapraavugal	Kutty	
1965	Devatha		
1965	Odayil Ninnu	Thomachan	
1965	Kattupookkal		
1965	Jeevithayaathra	Ringmaster	
1965	Kathirunna Nikah	Moideen	
1966	Puthri	Madhavan	
1966	Kadamattathachan		
1966	Anarkali	Kasim	
1966	Priyathama		
1966	Kaattumallika		
1967	Pavappettaval	Pappu Ashan	
1967	Kasavuthattam	Paarakkoottathil Aliyaar	
1967	Chekuthante Kotta		
1967	Chithramela		
1967	Mulkireedam		
1967	Kavalam Chundan		
1967	Mynatharuvi Kolakase		
1967	Karutha Rathrikal		
1967	Lady Doctor	Thommi	
1967	Thalirukal		
1967	Khadeeja		
1967	N.G.O		
1967	Agniputhri	Embranthiri	
1967	Ollathumathi		
1967	Naadan Pennu	Aliyaar	
1967	Arakkillam		
1968	Karutha Pournami		
1968	Adhyapika		
1968	Punnapra Vayalar	Ouseph	
1968	Kodungallooramma	Konkammavan	
1968	Kaliyalla Kalyanam		
1968	Hotel High Range	Velu Pilla	
1968	Pengal		
1968	Kadal	Peter	
1968	Thirichadi	P. C. Chacko	
1969	Poojapushpam		
1969	Kuruthykkalam		
1969	Jwala	Pankan	
1969	Koottukudumbam		
1969	Soosi	Thomachan	
1969	Chattambikkavala	Ponnan	
1969	Urangatha Sundari	Bhrandan	
1969	Janmabhoomi	Pillai	
1969	Ballatha Pahayan	Pillai	
1969	Nurse		
1969	Kumara Sambhavam	Vikadan	

==== 1970s ====
Year	Title	Role	Notes
1970	Sabarimala Sree Dharmashastha		
1970	Thara	Ayyappan	
1970	Nilakkatha Chalanangal		
1970	Swapnangal	Chellappan	
1970	Madhuvidhu	Ganesh	
1970	Dathuputhran	Kunjavarachan	
1970	Abhayam	Pachu Pilla	
1970	Pearl View	Boss	
1970	Othenante Makan	Anakkan	
1970	Ningalenne Communistakki	Pappu	
1970	Nazhikakkallu	Gopalan	
1970	Palunku Pathram		
1971	Avalalpam Vaikippoyi		
1971	Kochaniyathi	Kunju Nair	
1971	Marunnattil Oru Malayali	Vittal	
1971	Agnimrigam	Shankunni	
1971	C.I.D. In Jungle		
1971	Panchavan Kaadu	Kannappan	
1971	Aabhijathyam	Pappiashan	
1971	Lora Neeyevide	Ponnappan	
1971	Kuttyedathi	Govindan Nair	
1971	Puthenveedu		
1971	Sarasayya	Chackochan	
1971	Bobanum Moliyum	Kittu Pilla	
1972	Sree Guruvayoorappan		
1972	Naadan Premam	Kunjan	
1972	Vidhyarthikale Ithile Ithile		
1972	Oru Sundariyude Katha	Pappu Shipayi	
1972	Postmane Kananilla	Nanu Nair	
1972	Gandharavakshetram	Govindan Nair	
1972	Preethi		
1972	Sathi		
1972	Prathikaram	Shobha's father	
1972	Manushyabandhangal	Nanu Nair	
1973	Panitheeratha Veedu	Chacko/Jose's father	
1973	Thenaruvi	Thulasi's father	
1973	Dharmayudham	Sankaran	
1973	Chenda		
1973	Nakhangal	Pappunni	
1973	Periyar		
1973	Thekkan Kattu	Mathai	
1973	Kaadu	Sankar	
1973	Azhakulla Saleena	Paappi	
1973	Aashachakram		
1973	Manushyaputhran	Kunjandi	
1973	Pavangal Pennungal		
1973	Ponnapuram Kotta		
1973	Enippadikal		
1973	Masappady Mathupillai		
1973	Kaliyugam		
1973	Nirmalyam		
1973	Swargaputhri	Hospital Warden	
1974	Nellu	Vaattuvelu	Guest appearance
1974	Youvanam	Kunju Nair	
1974	Udayam Kizhakku Thanne		
1974	Thumbolarcha	Panar	
1974	Thacholi Marumakan Chanthu	Vayttil Thampan	
1974	Checkpost		
1974	Durga	Ambu	
1974	Vandikkari		
1974	Pathiravum Pakalvelichavum		
1975	Swami Ayyappan		
1975	Boy Friend		
1975	Ullasa Yaathra		
1975	Abhimaanam	Vasu Pilla	
1976	Pushpasharam		
1977	Vidarunna Mottukal	Pappan Pilla	
1977	Taxi Driver		
1977	Achaaram Ammini Osharam Omana	Paulose	
1978	Kaithappoo		
1978	Kadathanaattu Maakkam	Paanan	
1979	Swapnangal Swanthamalla		

==== 1980s ====
Year	Title	Role	Notes
1980	Paalattu Kunjikannan		
1981	Sanchari	Palpu's father	
1983	Pallamkuzhi		
1983	Kaathirunna Naal		
1984	Sabarimala Dharshanam		
1985	Madhuvidhu Theerum Mumbe		

=== As a singer ===
- Vayaranu Nammalkku Daivam as Thaskaraveeran 1957
