= Navalokam =

- Directed by: V. Krishnan
- Written by: Ponkunnam Varkey
- Screenplay by: Ponkunnam Varkey
- Produced by: Pappachan
- Starring: Thikkurissy Sukumaran Nair, Miss Kumari
- Cinematography: P. K. Madhavan Nair
- Edited by: K. D. George
- Music by: V. Dakshinamoorthy
- Release date: 29 March 1951
- Country: India
- Language: Malayalam

Navalokam is a 1951 Indian Malayalam-language film, directed by V. Krishnan and produced by Pappachan. The film stars Thikkurissy Sukumaran Nair and Miss Kumari in lead roles. The film had musical score by V Dakshinamoorthy.

== Cast ==
- Thikkurissy Sukumaran Nair
- Miss Kumari
- Muthukulam Raghavan Pilla
- Vanchiyoor Madhavan Nair
- Sebastian Kunjukunju Bhagavathar
- Sethulakshmi (Old)
- T. S. Muthaiah
