= Yachakan =

- Directed by: R. Velappan Nair
- Written by: P. S. Nair
- Screenplay by: P. S. Nair
- Produced by: K. S. Akhileswarayyar
- Starring: Prof. M. P. Manmathan; Kottarakkara Sreedharan Nair; Miss Kumari
- Cinematography: R. Velappan Nair
- Edited by: K. D. George
- Music by: S. N. Chaami (S. N. Ranganathan)
- Production company: Kairali Productions
- Distributed by: Central Pictures Release, Kottayam
- Release date: 12 September 1951
- Country: India
- Language: Malayalam

Yachakan is a 1951 Indian Malayalam-language film, directed by R. Velappan Nair and produced by K. S. Akhileswarayyar. The film stars Prof. M. P. Manmathan, Kottarakkara Sreedharan Nair and Miss Kumari. The musical score is by S. N. Chaami (S. N. Ranganathan).

== Cast ==
- Prof. M. P. Manmathan
- Kottarakkara Sreedharan Nair
- Miss Kumari
- Muthukulam Raghavan Pilla
- Aranmula Ponnamma
- S. P. Pillai
- Achamma
- Pallam Joseph
- Thankam
- Ambalappuzha Krishnamoorthy
- Lakshmikkutti
- Rajamma
- Ambalappuzha Meenakshi
- S. J. Dev
- Thiruvananthapuram Kuttan Pillai
