= Kumari Thankam =

Indian actress

- Born: Ammukutty Parvathy Thankam; 2 June 1901; Thiruvananthapuram, Kerala, India
- Died: 8 March 2011 (aged 109); Chennai, Tamil Nadu, India
- Occupation: Actress
- Years active: 1952–1970
- Spouse: P. K. Sathyapal
- Children: 3
- Relatives: Sreelatha Namboothiri (niece) Travancore Sisters

Kumari Thankam was an Indian actress who acted in Malayalam cinema. She was a lead actress during the late 1950s and 1960s in Malayalam. She made her debut in Aathmasakhi in 1952. She acted in more than 50 movies.

== Personal life ==
Kumari came from Poojapura, Thiruvananthapuram. She was married to a brother of the Lalitha-Padmini-Ragini trio, producer P. K. Sathyapal. They had three children: late S. Padmanabhan, late S. Jayapal and Asha. She died on 8 March 2011 at Shenoy Nagar, Chennai.

== Filmography ==
=== As an actress ===
Year	Title	Role	Notes
1952	Aathmasakhi		
1952	Visappinte Vili		
1953	Thiramala		
1953	Lokaneethi		
1953	Ponkathir		
1954	Balyasakhi		
1954	Avan Varunnu		
1955	C.I.D.		
1955	Aniyathi	Jayanthy	
1956	Manthravadi	Kalyani	
1956	Minnunnathellam Ponnalla		
1956	Koodappirappu		
1957	Jailppulli	Sudha	
1957	Deva Sundari		
1957	Achanum Makanum	Sarasu	
1970	Moodalmanju		
1976	Madhuram Thirumadhuram		

=== As a singer ===
- Vannaalum Mohanane ... Minnunnathellaam Ponnalla (1957)
