= T. S. Muthaiah =

Indian actor

- Born: Sachidhananthan Pillai, Muthaiah Pillai; 22 January 1923; Fort Kochi, Kingdom of Cochin, British India
- Died: 17 February 1992 (aged 69)
- Occupations: Actor; director
- Years active: 1951–1992

T. S. Muthaiah (22 January 1923 – 17 February 1992) was a Malayalam and Tamil film actor. He was a popular actor in both film industries and usually played character and supporting roles in the 1950s and 1960s.

== Background ==
T. S. Muthaiah was born in 1923 to T. M. Sachidhananthan Pillai and Gomathi Ammal in Kochi. His first film was Navalokam in 1951. He died in 1992.

== Filmography ==
=== Director ===
- Ballatha Pahayan
- Chithramela

=== Actor ===
- Sreemad Bhagavadgeetha (1977)
- Pushpasharam (1976)
- Anubhavam (1976)
- Vanadevatha (1976) as Prof Das
- Chirikkudukka (1976)
- Ozhukkinethire (1976)
- Pravaaham (1975) as Gopala Pilla
- Kalyaanappanthal (1975)
- Thiruvonam (1975)
- Love Marriage (1975) as RK Nair
- Paalazhi Madhanam (1975)
- Alibabayum 41 Kallanmaarum (1975) as Rahman
- Chattambikkalyaani (1975) as Pareed
- Sindhu (1975) as Govinda Menon
- Babumon (1975) as Ashaan
- Ayodhya (1975)
- Ulsavam (1975) as Chief Engineer
- Ankathattu (1974)
- Panchathanthram (1974) as Dinesh Chandran
- Suprabhaatham (1974)
- Night Duty (1974)
- Pattabhishekam (1974) as Gopi Pilla
- Bhoogolam Thiriyunnu (1974)
- Ayalathe Sundari (1974) as Panikkar
- Arakkallan Mukkaalkkallan (1974)
- Chakravakam 1974) as Devassia's father
- College Girl (1974)
- Chandrakaantham (1974)
- Oru Pidi Ari (1974)
- Raajahamsam (1974)
- Kaamini (1974)
- Urvashi Bharathi (1973)
- Veendum Prabhatham (1973)
- Udayam (1973) as Vasu Pilla
- Kaalachakram (1973)
- Maram (1973) as Govindan Nair
- Nakhangal (1973)
- Bhadradeepam (1973) as Govinda Pilla
- Ladies Hostel (1973) as Raghavan
- Driksakshi (1973) as Sadanandan
- Thottavadi (1973) as Priest
- Thaniniram (1973) as P. K. Warrier
- Interview (1973) as Keshava Pilla
- Panchavadi (1973) as Thamarassery Kartha
- Brahmachaari (1972)
- Manthrakodi (1972)
- Maravil Thirivu Sookshikkuka (1972) as Muniyandi
- Nrithasaala (1972) as Govinda Panikkar
- Miss Mary (1972) as Paul
- Taxi Car (1972) as Father Frederick
- Kandavarundo (1972)
- Sambhavami Yuge Yuge (1972) as Shivasankara Panikkar
- Lakshyam (1972)
- Pushpaanjali (1972) as Madhava Menon
- Gangaasangamam (1971)
- Manpeda (1971)
- Navavadhu (1971)
- Puthen Veedu (1971)
- Sindooracheppu 1971) as Appunni Kaimal
- Ernakulam Junction (1971) as Vasavan
- Yogamullaval (1971)
- Shiksha (1971) as Ramunni Menon
- C.I.D. in Jungle (1971)
- Oru Penninte Katha (1971)
- Makane Ninakku Vendi (1971) as Peelippochan
- Vilaykku Vaangiya Veena (1971) as Raghava Panikkar
- Thapaswini (1971)
- Rathri Vandi (1971) as Peter
- C.I.D. Nazir (1971) as Sankara Panikkar
- Vivaaham Swargathil (1970)
- Ammayenna Sthree (1970)
- Bheekara Nimishangal (1970) as Vikraman Thampi
- Kalpana (1970)
- Sabarimala Sree Dharmashastha (1970)
- Detective 909 Keralathil (1970)
- Anaadha (1970)
- Palunku Paathram (1970)
- Vivaahitha (1970) as Meena's Father
- Virunnukari (1969) as Panikkar
- Pooja Pushpam (1969)
- Mooladhanam (1969) as Malathy's Father
- Puthiya Bhoomi (1968) as Veeraiya
- Agni Pareeksha (1968) as Raghavan
- Velutha Kathreena (1968) as Thevan
- Anchusundarikal (1968)
- Pengal (1968)
- Anaachadanam (1969)
- Collector Malathy (1967) as Chathan Master
- Iruttinte Athmavu(1967) as Rajan
- Anveshichu Kandethiyilla (1967)
- Udyogastha (1967)
- Agniputhri (1967) as Dr.Jayadevan
- Balyakalasakhi (1967)
- Pooja (1967)
- Ollathu Mathi (1967)
- Naadan Pennu (1967)
- Kudumbam (1967)
- Jeevikkaan Anuvadikkoo (1967)
- Maadi Veettu Mappillai (1967) as Balu's Father
- Rowdy (1966)
- Kalyana Rathriyil (1966)
- Kanakachilanka (1966)
- Pinchuhridayam (1966)
- Kalithozhan (1966)
- Thankakudam (1965)
- Porter Kunjali (1965) as Kunjali
- Muthalali (1965)
- Kathirunna Nikah (1965)
- Rajamalli (1965)
- Inapraavugal (1965)
- Shyamala Chechi (1965)
- Devatha (1965)
- Kochumon (1965)
- Rosie (1965)
- Bhoomiyile Malakha (1965) as Achuthan Nair
- Ore Bhoomi Ore Raktham (1964)
- Sree Guruvayoorappan (1964) as Melpathoor Narayana Battathiri
- Devaalayam (1964)
- Bharthavu (1964)
- Thayin Madiyil (1964) (Tamil)
- Kalanju Kittiya Thankam (1964) as Unnithan
- School Master (1964) as Sekharan Nair
- Oraal Koodi Kallanaayi (1964) as Govindan
- Chilamboli (1963)
- Doctor (1963) as Alex
- Swargarajyam (1962)
- Bhaagyajaathakam (1962)
- Annai (1962)
- Laila Majnu (1962)
- Puthiya Akasam Puthiya Bhoomi (1962) as Sankarankutty Nair
- Krishna Kuchela(1961)
- Kandam Becha Kottu(1961) as Mammad
- Ummini Thanka (1961) as Ramayya
- Arappavan (1961) as Paramu
- Sthreehridayam (1960)
- Naadodikal (1959)
- Chathurangam (1959)
- Nairu Pidicha Pulivalu (1958) as Paithal Nair
- Mariakutty (1958) as Thoma
- Randidangazhi (1958)
- Padatha Painkili (1957) as Lucko
- Achanum Makanum (1957)
- Jailppulli (1957) as Shekharan
- Deva Sundari (1957)
- Koodappirappu (1956)
- Manthravaadi (1956)
- Aathmaarpanam (1956)
- CID (1955)
- Aniyathi (1955) as Bhargavan
- Harishchandra(1955)
- Kaalam Maarunnu (1955)
- Avakasi (1954) as Kurup
- Baalyasakhi (1954) as Nair
- Ponkathir (1953)
- Lokaneethi (1953)
- Thiramala(1953)
- Amma (1952)
- Marumakal (1952)
- Aathmasakhi (1952)
- Navalokam (1951)
