= Merryland Studio =

Malayalam film production studio

- Type: Private
- Industry: Motion pictures
- Founded: 1951; 75 years ago
- Founder: P. Subramaniam
- Headquarters: Nemom, Thiruvananthapuram, Kerala, India
- Area served: Kerala
- Products: Films
- Services: Film production; Film distribution
- Subsidiaries: Neela Productions Vaika Merryland Release

Merryland Studio is an Indian film studio based in Thiruvananthapuram, Kerala. It was established in 1950 by former Thiruvananthapuram mayor and businessman P. Subramaniam. He produced 70 films, 59 of them directed by himself. He was active between 1951 – 1979. The studio's home productions were made under the company Neela Productions. Merryland Studio was famous for their professional rivalry with Kunchacko's Udaya Studios. In 2024, the company started distributing Tamil films under Vaika Merryland Release in Kerala.

== History ==
Subramaniam bought land at Nemom, Thiruvananthapuram, and founded the studio in 1951. Their first production was Aaathmasakhi (1952). Subramaniam primarily worked as a director for the studio. The studio's list includes a string of landmark films of Malayalam cinema history.

In the 1950s, Malayalam film production were shuttling between Madras and Udaya Studio in Alappuzha. It was at that time Merryland Studio was set up at five-and-a-half acres of land, easing the productions of Malayalam films. At its peak, the studio used to employ close to 80 personnel. Many of the actors and actresses frequently appeared in Merryland films: Prem Nazir, who acted in at least 30 films in the first 10 years of his career; Sathyan, who was introduced in Aaathmasakhi; Madhu, who was also a family friend of theirs; K. V. Shanthi, also known as "Merryland Shanthi"; the Travancore sisters trio (Lalitha, Padmini, and Ragini); and Sharada. Others who were introduced through Neela Productions' films are Kottarakkara Sreedharan Nair, Miss Kumari, Vinodini Sasimohan, Srividya, Aranmula Ponnamma, S. P. Pillai among others. The competition between Udaya Studio and Merryland Studio was so intense that at one point, when Merryland released Bhaktha Kuchela, Udaya released Krishna Kuchela (1961) with the same story; after that film, they decided to stop the practice. Their Kumarasambhavam (1969) won the first Kerala State Film Award for Best Film when it was established in 1969. Merryland's films revolved around either social issues or mythology; they were mostly known for mythological films, which were the most successful. Bhakta Kuchela, Sree Guruvayoorappan (1972), Swami Ayyappan (1975), and Sreemurukan (1977) were among their most successful mythological films.

Hridayathinte Nirangal was released before Subramaniam died in 1978. In 2021, screenwriter John Paul wrote in an article that "The studios set up by P. Subramaniam and Kunchacko—Merryland and Udaya—respectively, led to the development of a full-fledged Malayalam film industry".

In 2022, Merryland Studios resumed film production under the newly christened Merryland Cinemas, headed by Visakh Subramaniam, who was also the founder of Funtastic Films, with Hridayam (2022) serving as its first production.

The company distributed Tamil films Demonte Colony 2 (2024), Viduthalai Part 2 (2024), and Retro (2025) in Kerala under Vaika Merryland Release.

== Films produced ==
=== Under Neela Productions ===
Year	Title	Director	Notes
1952	Aathmasakhi	G. R. Rao	First film to produce
1953	Ponkathir	E. R. Cooper	
1954	Balya Sakhi	Antony Mitradas	
1954	Avakasi	Antony Mitradas	
1955	C.I.D.	M. Krishnan Nair	
1955	Aniyathi	M. Krishnan Nair	
1956	Manthravadi	P. Subramaniam	
1957	Padatha Painkili	P. Subramaniam	
1957	Jailpully	P. Subramaniam	
1958	Randidangazhi	P. Subramaniam	
1958	Mariakutty	P. Subramaniam	
1959	Aana Valarthiya Vanampadi	P. Subramaniam	
1960	Poothali	P. Subramaniam	
1960	Petraval Kanda Peruvazhvu	P. Subramaniam	Tamil film
1961	Christmas Rathri	P. Subramaniam	
1961	Bhakta Kuchela	P. Subramaniam	
1962	Snehadeepam	P. Subramaniam	
1962	Shree Rama Pattabhishekam	G.K. Ramu	
1963	Snapaka Yohannan	P. Subramaniam	
1963	Kalayum Kaminiyum	P. Subramaniam	
1964	Atom Bomb	P. Subramaniam	
1964	Althaara	P. Subramaniam	
1965	Pattuthoovaala	P. Subramaniam	
1965	Kaliyodum	P. Subramaniam	
1966	Puthri	P. Subramaniam	
1966	Priyathama	P. Subramaniam	
1966	Kaattumallika	P. Subramaniam	
1968	Hotel Highrange	P. Subramaniam	
1968	Adhyapika	P. Subramaniam	
1969	Urangatha Sundary	P. Subramaniam	
1969	Kumara Sambhavam	P. Subramaniam	
1970	Swapnangal	P. Subramaniam	
1971	Kochaniyathi	P. Subramaniam	
1971	Aana Valarthiya Vanampadiyude Makan	P. Subramaniam	
1972	Sree Guruvayoorappan	P. Subramaniam	
1972	Professor	P. Subramaniam	
1972	Preethi	William Thomas	
1973	Swarga Puthri	P. Subramaniam	
1973	Malai Naattu Mangai	P. Subramaniam	Tamil film
1973	Kaadu	P. Subramaniam	
1974	Vandikkari	P. Subramaniam	
1974	Devi Kanyakumari	P. Subramaniam	
1975	Swami Ayyappan	P. Subramaniam	
1976	Hiridhayam Oru Kshethram	P. Subramaniam	
1976	Amba Ambika Ambalika	P. Subramaniam	
1977	Vidarunna Mottugal	P. Subramaniam	
1977	Sreemurukan	P. Subramaniam	
1977	Rowdy Rajamma	P. Subramaniam	
1979	Hridhayathinte Nirangal	P. Subramaniam	

=== Under Merryland Cinemas ===
Year	Title	Director	Notes
2022	Hridayam	Vineeth Sreenivasan	3rd highest-grossing film of the year
2024	Varshangalkku Shesham	Vineeth Sreenivasan	
2025	Karam	Vineeth Sreenivasan	

== Films distributed ==
=== Vaika Merryland Release ===
Year	Title	Director	Language
2024	Demonte Colony 2	R. Ajay Gnanamuthu	Tamil
2024	Viduthalai Part 2	Vetrimaaran	Tamil
2025	Retro	Karthik Subbaraj	Tamil

== Television ==
The following serials are produced by Karthikeyan, Murugan and Saranya Subramaniam under the banner of Merryland, Sree Subramaniam Enterprises, Sree Saravana Enterprises and Sree Saran Creations.

- All TV series are in Malayalam.

Year	Title	Genre	Director	Channel	Notes
2004–2005	Kadamattathu Kathanar	Horror	T. S. Saji	Asianet	
2005	Ezham Kadalinakkare	Thriller	Suresh Unnithan	Asianet	
2005	Krishna Kripa Sagaram	Mythology	Rajasenan	Amrita TV	
2006–2008	Swami Ayyappan	Mythology	Suresh Unnithan	Asianet	
2008	Shri Krishna Leela	Mythology	Suresh Unnithan	Asianet	
2008–2010	Shri Mahabhagavatham	Mythology	Thulasidas	Asianet	
2009	Swami Ayyappan Saranam	Mythology	Thulasidas	Asianet	
2008–2012	Devimahathmyam	Mythology	Viji Thampi, Thulasidas	Asianet	longest running mythological TV series, Completed 1000 episodes
2010–2012	Alavudeente Albuthavilakku	Fantasy	T.S.Suresh Babu	Asianet	
2012–2015	Amma	Emotional	Kannan Thamarakkulam/Dileep Thavanur	Asianet	Remake of Maa aired in Star Jalsha
2012	Sabarimala Shri Dharmashastha	Mythology	Thulasidas	Asianet	
2015–2016	Vazhve Mayam	Drama	Manoj L. M.	DD Malayalam	
2015	Sreekrishna Vijayam	Mythology	Manoj L. M.	Janam TV	
2015	Durga	Drama	Kurupp Mararikkulam	Janam TV	
2015	7 Rathrikal	Horror	Manoj L. M.	Asianet	
2015–2017	Pranayam	Drama	Sudheesh Sankar/Thulasidas	Asianet	
2016–2018	Sathyam Shivam Sundaram	Mythology	Manoj LM	Amrita TV	
2018	Kumarasambhavam	Mythology	Manoj L. M.	Amrita TV	
2019–2020	Sabarimala Swami Ayyappan	Mythology	Kannan Thamarakkulam	Asianet	
2020–2023	Paadatha Painkilli	Drama	Sudheesh Sankar	Asianet	
2023	Madhanakamarajan	Epic	Manoj L.M.	YouTube	Web serial
2023-2025	Malikappuram: Apathbandhavan Ayyappan	Mythology	Sudheesh Sankar; Vinod Bhagavathinada	Asianet	
2023- 2024	Amme Bhagavathy	Mythology	Viji Thampi	Flowers TV	
2024	Attukal Amma	Mythology	Viji Thampi	Flowers TV	
2024- 2025	Etho Janma Kalpanayil	Drama	Sachin K Ibaque	Asianet	
2026- present	Valyettan	Drama	Binu Vellathooval	Zee Keralam	
2026- present	Thenmavin Kombathu	Drama	Vasudev Sanal	Sun Surya	
