= Karutha Rathrikal =

1968 film by P. Subramaniam

- Promotional poster
- Directed by: P. Subramaniam
- Screenplay by: Nagavally R. S. Kurup
- Based on: Strange Case of Dr Jekyll and Mr Hyde by Robert Louis Stevenson
- Produced by: P. Subramaniam
- Starring: Madhu; K. V. Shanthi; T. K. Balachandran; Rajasree
- Cinematography: Nair E. N. C.
- Edited by: N. Gopalakrishnan
- Music by: M. S. Baburaj
- Production company: Neela Productions
- Release date: 9 June 1967
- Country: India
- Language: Malayalam

Karutha Rathrikal (transl. The Darkest Nights) is a 1967 Indian Malayalam-language science fiction thriller film directed by P. Subramaniam under the name Mahesh. An adaptation of the 1886 novella Strange Case of Dr Jekyll and Mr Hyde by Robert Louis Stevenson, it was the first science fiction film in the history of Malayalam cinema.

== Plot ==
Santhan, a medical practitioner, is in love with his cousin Vimala, with whom his marriage is fixed. Vimala's father, a banker, died under mysterious circumstances. Santhan develops a medicine, which transforms a person into a monstrous creature when consumed. He also invents the formula that reverts the person back to their original self. Santhan keeps this invention a secret. After reading his uncle's diary, Santhan realises that other voracious directors of the bank are responsible for his death. Santhan plans revenge on them by utilising his invention.

Vimala's cousin Mohan is in love with Vilasini, a night club dancer. The other bank directors influence Mohan, through Vilasini, and try to steal the bank documents from Vimala's house. A monstrous creature appears before Vilasini and threatens her death if she acts accordingly. Vilasini discovers that Santhan is the one killing the bank directors. Mohan also learns about the secret that Santhan is the monstrous creature.

Vimala's uncle Kochammavan comes to the city to conduct Vimala and Santhan's marriage. The police also arrive there in pursuit of the monstrous creature. Mohan reaches the spot and exposes Santhan, who then transforms himself into the monstrous creature. But before the police can arrest Santhan, he commits suicide.

== Cast ==
- Madhu as Santhan
- T. K. Balachandran as Mohan
- Vaikkom Mani as Kochammavan
- K. V. Shanthi as Vimala
- Rajasree as Vilasini

== Production ==
Karutha Rathrikal, adapted from the novella Strange Case of Dr Jekyll and Mr Hyde by Robert Louis Stevenson, was the first science fiction film in Malayalam cinema.

== Soundtrack ==
The music was composed by Baburaj and the lyrics were written by O. N. V. Kurup. Songs like "Aararivoo Aararivoo" and "Omanathinkale" attained popularity.

No.	Song	Singers	Lyrics	Length
1	"Aararivoo Aararivoo"	Kamukara	O. N. V. Kurup	
2	"Chirikkudukke"	K. J. Yesudas, B. Vasantha	O. N. V. Kurup	
3	"Kilimakale"	S. Janaki	O. N. V. Kurup	
4	"Maanathekku"	Kamala, Zero Babu	O. N. V. Kurup	
5	"Maayayalla"	L. R. Eeswari, M. S. Baburaj	O. N. V. Kurup	
6	"Omanathinkale" (Sad Scene II)	S. Janaki	O. N. V. Kurup	
7	"Omanathinkale" (Happy)	S. Janaki	O. N. V. Kurup	
8	"Omanathinkale" (Sad)	S. Janaki	O. N. V. Kurup	
9	"Pookkalaanen Koottukaar"	L. R. Eeswari	O. N. V. Kurup	

== See also ==
- Science fiction films in India
