= Lady Doctor =

- Directed by: K. Sukumar
- Written by: K. Jacob; Nagavally R. S. Kurup (dialogues)
- Screenplay by: Nagavally R. S. Kurup
- Produced by: P. Subramaniam
- Starring: Madhu; Sheela; Muthukulam Raghavan Pillai; Vaikkam Mani
- Cinematography: E. N. C. Nair
- Edited by: N. Gopalakrishnan
- Music by: V. Dakshinamoorthy
- Production company: Neela
- Distributed by: Neela
- Release date: 14 April 1967
- Country: India
- Language: Malayalam

Lady Doctor is a 1967 Indian Malayalam film, directed by K. Sukumar and produced by P. Subramaniam. The film stars Madhu, Sheela, Muthukulam Raghavan Pillai and Vaikkam Mani in the lead roles. The film had musical score by V. Dakshinamoorthy.

== Cast ==
- Madhu as Johny
- Sheela as Lilly
- Muthukulam Raghavan Pillai as Mathai
- Vaikkam Mani
- Aranmula Ponnamma as Shoshamma
- Joseph Chacko
- Kottarakkara Sreedharan Nair
- Pankajavalli as Eliyamma
- Rajeshwari
- S. P. Pillai as Thommi
- K. V. Shanthi as Marykutty

== Soundtrack ==
The music was composed by V. Dakshinamoorthy and the lyrics were written by P. Bhaskaran.

No.	Song	Singers	Lyrics	Length (m:ss)
1	"Avideyumilla Visesham"	A. P. Komala	P. Bhaskaran	
2	"Ellaam Ellaam Thakarnallo"	P. Leela	P. Bhaskaran	
3	"Kanninayum Kanninayum"	S. Janaki, Kamukara	P. Bhaskaran	
4	"Madhurikkum Ormakale"	Kamukara	P. Bhaskaran	
5	"Manoharam"	L. R. Eeswari	P. Bhaskaran	
6	"Vidilla Njaan"	S. Janaki, Kamukara	P. Bhaskaran	
