= Karutha Kai =

- Directed by: M. Krishnan Nair
- Written by: Sree
- Produced by: P. Subramaniam
- Starring: Prem Nazir; Sheela; Adoor Bhasi; Thikkurissy Sukumaran Nair
- Cinematography: M. Kannappan
- Edited by: N. Gopalakrishnan
- Music by: M. S. Baburaj
- Production company: Neela Productions
- Release date: 14 August 1964
- Country: India
- Language: Malayalam

Karutha Kai (transl. Black Hand; metaphor for "guilty") is a 1964 Indian Malayalam-language film, directed by M. Krishnan Nair and produced by P. Subramaniam. The film stars Prem Nazir, Sheela, Adoor Bhasi and Thikkurissy Sukumaran Nair. It was released on 14 August 1964. The film was remade in Telugu as Loguttu Perumallakeruka (1966).

== Cast ==
- Prem Nazir as Basu
- Sheela as Latha
- K. V. Shanthi as Radha
- S. P. Pillai as Detective
- Adoor Bhasi as Detective
- Thikkurissy Sukumaran Nair as Thambi
- Mannoor Velayudhan Pillai as police officer
- Jose Prakash as Vikraman
- Aranmula Ponnamma
- Baby Vinodini
- Kundara Bhasi
- Paravoor Bharathan as Khader

== Soundtrack ==
The music was composed by M. S. Baburaj and the lyrics were written by Thirunayinaarkurichi Madhavan Nair.

Song	Singers
"Ezhu Nirangalil Ninnude Roopam"	S. Janaki, Kamukara Purushothaman
"Kallane Vazhiyil"	K. J. Yesudas, M. S. Baburaj
"Kannukal"	L. R. Eeswari, Kamukara Purushothaman
"Maanatheppenne"	P. Leela
"Mungaakkadalil"	L. R. Eeswari
"Paalappoovin"	S. Janaki
"Panchavarnnathatha"	K. J. Yesudas, Kamukara Purushothaman
