= Sreemurukan =

Indian film by P. Subramaniam

- Directed by: P. Subramaniam
- Written by: Nagavally R. S. Kurup (dialogues)
- Screenplay by: Nagavally R. S. Kurup
- Produced by: P. Subramaniam
- Starring: Kaviyoor Ponnamma; Thikkurissy Sukumaran Nair; P. C. George; Hari; Rajasree
- Cinematography: Thara
- Edited by: N. Gopalakrishnan
- Music by: G. Devarajan
- Production company: Neela
- Distributed by: Neela
- Release date: 26 August 1977
- Country: India
- Language: Malayalam

Sreemurukan is a 1977 Indian Malayalam-language film, directed and produced by P. Subramaniam. The film, based on the stories of the Hindu god Kartikeya, also called as Murugan, stars Kaviyoor Ponnamma, Thikkurissy Sukumaran Nair, P. C. George and Hari. The film has musical score by G. Devarajan.

== Cast ==
- Ravikumar as Murugan
  - Baby Sumathi as child Murugan
  - Master Raghu as adolescent Murugan
- Kaviyoor Ponnamma as Kamalakshi
- Thikkurissy Sukumaran Nair as Padmanabha Pilla
- P. C. George as Temple Manager
- Hari as Naradan
- Kedamangalam Sadanandan as Madhavan Pilla
- Raghavan
- Adoor Bhavani
- Anandavally as Lakshmi
- Aranmula Ponnamma as Bharathi
- Aroor Sathyan
- Chavara V. P. Nair as Broker Pilla
- Dr. Namboothiri as Devendran
- Gemini Ganesan as Shivan
- Rajasree as Rajeswari

*Ushakumari as Amritavalli, Valli

- Vanchiyoor Madhavan Nair as Murugadas
- Kottarakkara Sreedharan Nair as Nambi Rajavu
- Kalashala Babu as Sukumaran

== Soundtrack ==
The music was composed by G. Devarajan.

No.	Song	Singers	Lyrics	Length (m:ss)
1	"Darshanam Nalkille"	P. Madhuri, Ambili	Sreekumaran Thampi	
2	"Devasenapathi"	K. J. Yesudas, Chorus	Sreekumaran Thampi	
3	"Jnaanappazham"	P. Susheela, P. Madhuri	Sreekumaran Thampi	
4	"Kainokki Phalam"	K. J. Yesudas, P. Madhuri	Sreekumaran Thampi	
5	"Muruka Unaroo"	P. Madhuri	Sreekumaran Thampi	
6	"Sachidaanandam"	K. J. Yesudas	Sreekumaran Thampi	
7	"Shakthi Than Aananda"	K. J. Yesudas	Sreekumaran Thampi	
8	"Thenavelanja Paadam"	P. Madhuri, Chorus	Sreekumaran Thampi	
9	"Thirumadhuram Nirayum"	P. Madhuri, Ambili	Sreekumaran Thampi	
10	"Thottu Poyallo Appooppan"	P. Madhuri	Sreekumaran Thampi	
11	"Vala Veno Chippivala"	K. J. Yesudas	Sreekumaran Thampi	
