= Kaattumaina =

- Theatrical release poster in Malayalam
- Directed by: M. Krishnan Nair
- Written by: Neela; Nagavally R. S. Kurup (dialogues)
- Screenplay by: Nagavally R. S. Kurup
- Produced by: P. Subramaniam
- Starring: J. Sasikumar; K. V. Shanthi; Muttathara Soman; Muthukulam Raghavan Pillai
- Edited by: N. Gopalakrishnan
- Music by: Br Lakshmanan
- Production company: Neela
- Release dates: 31 August 1963 (Malayalam); 18 October 1963 (Tamil)
- Country: India
- Languages: Malayalam; Tamil

Kaattumaina (transl. Forest Myna) is a 1963 Indian film, directed by M. Krishnan Nair and produced by P. Subramaniam. Shot simultaneously in Malayalam and Tamil languages, the film stars J. Sasikumar, K. V. Shanthi, Muttathara Soman and Muthukulam Raghavan Pillai. The Tamil version was on released on 18 October 1963 and the Malayalam version on 31 August the same year. Both versions were successful.

== Cast ==
- J. Sasikumar
- K. V. Shanthi
- Muttathara Soman
- Rajasree
- Vijayalalitha
- Muthukulam Raghavan Pillai
- C. L. Anandan
- Jose Prakash
- Sheela
- Prem Nazir

== Soundtrack ==
The music was composed by Br Lakshmanan and the lyrics were written by Thirunayinaarkurichi Madhavan Nair.

Song	Singers
"Kaattukurinji Kaattukurinji"	P. Susheela
"Kaavilamme"	Kamukara
"Kazhuthil Chippiyum"	P. Leela, Renuka
"Maayapettiyundu"	Mehboob
"Malamukalil Maamarathil"	Kamukara
"Naanathaal"	Kamukara, Gracy
"Nalla Nalla Kayyaanallo"	P. Leela
"Paadaan Chundu"	P. Leela
"Vaa Vaa Vanaraajaave"	P. Susheela, K. P. Udayabhanu
