= Nurse (film) =

- Directed by: Thikkurissy Sukumaran Nair
- Written by: Kanam E. J.
- Screenplay by: Kanam E. J.
- Produced by: P. Subramaniam
- Starring: Jayabharathi; Thikkurissy Sukumaran Nair; Muthukulam Raghavan Pillai; Bahadoor
- Cinematography: E. N. C. Nair
- Edited by: N. Gopalakrishnan
- Music by: M. B. Sreenivasan
- Production company: Neela
- Distributed by: Neela
- Release date: 20 June 1969
- Country: India
- Language: Malayalam

Nurse is a 1969 Indian Malayalam-language social drama film, directed by Thikkurissy Sukumaran Nair and produced by P. Subramaniam. The film stars Jayabharathi, Thikkurissy Sukumaran Nair, Muthukulam Raghavan Pillai and Bahadoor. The film had musical score by M. B. Sreenivasan.

== Plot ==
The film explores the societal, familial, and personal struggles of the working-class female protagonist (a nurse, played by Jayabharathi) navigating her career and emotional relationships.

== Cast ==
- Jayabharathi
- Thikkurissy Sukumaran Nair
- Muthukulam Raghavan Pillai
- Bahadoor
- Kottarakkara Sreedharan Nair
- Pankajavalli
- Pushpalatha
- Ramakrishna
- S. P. Pillai
- K. V. Shanthi

== Soundtrack ==
The music was composed by MB Sreenivasan with lyrics by Sreekumaran Thampi.

No.	Song	Singers	Lyrics	Length (m:ss)
1	"Harinaamakeerthanam"	K. J. Yesudas	Sreekumaran Thampi	
2	"Harinaamakeerthanam" (D)	K. J. Yesudas, S. Janaki	Sreekumaran Thampi	
3	"Kaadurangi Kadalurangi"	P. Susheela	Sreekumaran Thampi	
4	"Muttiyaal Thurakkaatha"	Kamukara	Sreekumaran Thampi	
5	"Muzhukkirukkee"	C. S. Radhadevi, Gopi	Sreekumaran Thampi	
6	"Vasantham Thurannu"	P. Susheela	Sreekumaran Thampi	
