= Kumara Sambhavam =

- Theatrical release poster
- Directed by: P. Subramaniam
- Screenplay by: Nagavally R. S. Kurup
- Story by: Kalidasa
- Produced by: P. Subramaniam
- Starring: Gemini Ganesan; Padmini; Sridevi; Srividya; Thikkurissy Sukumaran Nair
- Cinematography: U. Rajagopal
- Edited by: N. Gopalakrishnan
- Music by: G. Devarajan
- Production company: Neela
- Distributed by: Neela
- Release date: 26 December 1969
- Country: India
- Language: Malayalam

Kumara Sambhavam is a 1969 Indian Malayalam-language Hindu mythological film directed and produced by P. Subramaniam. Based on the epic poem of the poet Kalidasa of the same name, it stars Gemini Ganesan, Padmini, Srividya and Thikkurissy Sukumaran Nair. The film won the first ever Kerala State Film Award for Best Film. The film stood apart in technical quality when compared to previous Malayalam films and is hence regarded as a landmark in the history of Malayalam cinema. It also marked Sridevi's first Malayalam film. The film was dubbed in Bengali as Hara Parvati in 1971 and Tamil under the same title.

== Cast ==
- Sridevi as Subramanian
- Gemini Ganesan as Paramashivan
- Padmini as Parvathi/Sathi
- Srividya as Menaka
- Thikkurissy Sukumaran Nair as Himavan, Parvathi's Father
- Jose Prakash as Devendran
- T. R. Omana
- Adoor Pankajam
- Aranmula Ponnamma as Parvathi's Mother
- Rajasree as Urvasi
- Kottarakkara Sreedharan Nair as Dakshan
- Pankajavalli
- S. P. Pillai
- T. K. Balachandran as Naradan

== Soundtrack ==
The songs written by Vayalar Rama Varma and ONV Kurup were set to tune by Devarajan. Most of them were based on classical ragas, like ‘Priyasakhi Gangey...' (Madhuri) in Suddha Dhanyasi, ‘Satya Siva soundaryangal...' (K. J. Yesudas) in Kalyani, and the dance number ‘Maya natana...' (P. Leela and Radha-Jayalakshmi) set in Khamas. The other hits include ‘Indukalamouli....' (Madhuri), ‘Nalla Haimavatha...' (P. Susheela and chorus), and a ragamalika, ‘Saravana poykayil...' (Kamukara Purushotaman).

Song	Singers	Lyrics
"Asthyutharasyaam (Bit)	K. J. Yesudas	Mahakavi Kalidasan
"Ellaam Sivamayam	Renuka	O. N. V. Kurup
"Indukkalaamouli	P. Madhuri	Vayalar Ramavarma
"Ksheerasaagara Nandini Pournami	P. Leela	Vayalar Ramavarma
"Maayaanadanavihaarini	P. Leela, Radha Jayalakshmi	O. N. V. Kurup
"Mallaakshee Manimaaril	M. G. Radhakrishnan, B. Vasantha	Vayalar Ramavarma
"Nallahaimavathabhoomiyil	P. Susheela, Chorus	O. N. V. Kurup
"Omkaaram Omkaaram	K. J. Yesudas	Vayalar Ramavarma
"Padmaasanathil	P. B. Sreenivas	Vayalar Ramavarma
"Polthinkalkkala	K. J. Yesudas	O. N. V. Kurup
"Priyasakhi Gange	P. Madhuri	O. N. V. Kurup
"Priyasakhi Gange (Movie Version)	P. Madhuri	O. N. V. Kurup
"Shailanandini	K. J. Yesudas, B. Vasantha	O. N. V. Kurup
"Sharavanappoykayil Avathaaram	P. Leela, Kamukara	Vayalar Ramavarma
"Thapassirunnu Devan	K. J. Yesudas	O. N. V. Kurup
