= Kochaniyathi =

- Directed by: P. Subramaniam
- Written by: S. L. Puram Sadanandan
- Screenplay by: S. L. Puram Sadanandan
- Produced by: P Subramaniam
- Starring: Madhu; Jayabharathi; Vincent; Ramachandran
- Cinematography: E. N. C. Nair
- Edited by: N. Gopalakrishnan
- Music by: Pukazhenthi
- Production company: Neela
- Distributed by: Neela
- Release date: 24 December 1971
- Country: India
- Language: Malayalam

Kochaniyathi is a 1971 Indian Malayalam film, directed and produced by P. Subramaniam. The film stars Madhu, Jayabharathi, Vincent and Ramachandran in the lead roles. The film had musical score by Pukazhenthi.

== Cast ==
- Madhu as Raju
- Jayabharathi as Indu
- Vincent as Doctor Mohan
- Ramachandran
- T. R. Omana as Raju's Mother
- Alummoodan as Cook
- Annamma
- Aranmula Ponnamma as Doctor's Mother
- Baby Sumathi as Indu (childhood)
- KPAC Sunny as Raghu
- Master Prabhakar as Raju (childhood)
- Pankajavalli as Kunchu Nair's Wife
- Paravoor Bharathan as Rowdy Soman
- S. P. Pillai as Kunchu Nair
- K. V. Shanthi as Karthyayini
- Sarasamma
- Somasekharan Nair

== Soundtrack ==
The music was composed by Pukazhenthi and the lyrics were written by Sreekumaran Thampi.

No.	Song	Singers	Lyrics	Length (m:ss)
1	"Agniparvatham"	K. J. Yesudas	Sreekumaran Thampi	
2	"Kochilam Kaatte"	K. J. Yesudas	Sreekumaran Thampi	
3	"Sundararaavil"	S. Janaki	Sreekumaran Thampi	
4	"Theyyaare Thaka Theyyaare"	S. Janaki, P. Jayachandran, Chorus	Sreekumaran Thampi	
5	"Thinkaleppole Chirikkunna"	P. Leela	Sreekumaran Thampi	
6	"Thinkaleppole Chirikkunna"	S. Janaki	Sreekumaran Thampi	
