= Kadal (1968 film) =

- Poster
- Directed by: M. Krishnan Nair
- Written by: Muttathu Varkey
- Produced by: P. Subramaniam
- Starring: Madhu; Sharada; Thikkurissy Sukumaran Nair; Shobha; Rajasree
- Cinematography: E. N. C. Nair
- Edited by: N. Gopalakrishnan
- Music by: M. B. Sreenivasan
- Production company: Neela
- Distributed by: Neela
- Release date: 15 August 1968
- Country: India
- Language: Malayalam

Kadal is a 1968 Indian Malayalam-language film, directed by M. Krishnan Nair and produced by P. Subramaniam. The film stars Madhu, Sharada, Thikkurissy Sukumaran Nair and Shobha. The film had musical score by M. B. Sreenivasan.

== Plot ==
Antony, a poor, hardworking fisherman who struggles to provide for his loving wife and their young daughter. While out fishing alone one day, Antony discovers a box of gold bars that smugglers had abandoned and hidden at sea. Antony brings the gold back home and the family's struggling days are over, at least in terms of money worries. However, the immense wealth completely turns the family's life upside down, and triggers testing changes in their peaceful existence.

== Cast ==
- Madhu as Antony
- Sharada as Mary
- K. P. Ummer as Lazar
- Rajasree as Rajeena
- S. P. Pillai as Peter
- Bahadoor as Paul
- K. V. Shanthi as Reetha
- Nellikode Bhaskaran as Lopez
- Baby Shobha
- Baby Sree Thikkurissi
- Baby Vijaya

== Soundtrack ==
The music was composed by M. B. Sreenivasan and the lyrics were written by Sreekumaran Thampi.

No.	Song	Singers	Lyrics	Length (m:ss)
1	"Aarum Kaanaathayyayya"	M. S. Padma, Renuka	Sreekumaran Thampi	
2	"Chirikkumpol Koode"	S. Janaki	Sreekumaran Thampi	
3	"Kadalinenthu Moham"	K. J. Yesudas	Sreekumaran Thampi	
4	"Kallanmaar Kaaryakkaaraayi"	K. J. Yesudas, Kamukara	Sreekumaran Thampi	
5	"Manushyan Kothikkunnu"	Kamukara	Sreekumaran Thampi	
6	"Paadaanaavaatha Raagam"	L. R. Eeswari	Sreekumaran Thampi]	
7	"Valayum Vanchiyum"	K. J. Yesudas, [Kamukara], Gomathy	Sreekumaran Thampi	
