= Hotel High Range =

- Directed by: P. Subramaniam
- Screenplay by: Nagavally R. S. Kurup
- Story by: Neela Productions Story Department
- Produced by: P. Subramaniam
- Starring: Sharada; Thikkurissy Sukumaran Nair; Ramakrishna; Aranmula Ponnamma
- Cinematography: E. N. C. Nair
- Edited by: N. Gopalakrishnan
- Music by: G. Devarajan
- Production company: Neela Productions
- Release date: 28 June 1968
- Country: India
- Language: Malayalam

Hotel High Range is a 1968 Indian Malayalam-language spy thriller film, directed and produced by P. Subramaniam. The film stars Sharada, Ramakrishna, Thikkurissy Sukumaran Nair, Kallayam Krishnadas and Aranmula Ponnamma. It was released on 28 June 1968.

== Cast ==
- Sharada as Nalini
- Thikkurissy Sukumaran Nair as Rajasahib
- Kallayam Krishnadas
- Aranmula Ponnamma as Ramesh's mother
- Bahadoor
- Jyothi
- Kottarakkara Sreedharan Nair as Dhanesh
- Nellikode Bhaskaran
- Paravoor Bharathan as Vasu
- Ramakrishna as Ramesh
- S. P. Pillai as Velu Pilla
- K. V. Shanthi as Madhumathi/Gracy

== Soundtrack ==
The music is composed by G. Devarajan, and lyrics were written by Vayalar Ramavarma.

No.	Title	Singer(s)	Length
1.	"Ajnaatha Gaayaka"	P. Susheela
2.	"Gangaa Yamunaa"	Kamukara
3.	"Kainiraye"	P. Susheela
4.	"Pandoru Shilpi"	K. J. Yesudas, B. Vasantha, T. R. Omana
5.	"Puthiya Raagam Puthiya Thaalam"	L. R. Eswari
6.	"Snehaswaroopini"	K. J. Yesudas
