= Viplavakarikal =

- Directed by: Mahesh
- Written by: Kedamangalam Sadanandan
- Screenplay by: Kedamangalam Sadanandan
- Produced by: P. Subramaniam
- Starring: Madhu; K. V. Shanthi; Muthukulam Raghavan Pillai; Ramachandran
- Cinematography: E. N. C. Nair
- Edited by: N. Gopalakrishnan
- Music by: G. Devarajan
- Production company: Neela
- Distributed by: Neela
- Release date: 12 January 1968
- Country: India
- Language: Malayalam

Viplavakarikal is a 1968 Indian Malayalam film, directed by Mahesh and produced by P. Subramaniam. The film stars Madhu, K. V. Shanthi, Muthukulam Raghavan Pillai and Ramachandran in the lead roles. The film had musical score by G. Devarajan.

== Cast ==
- Madhu as Madhava Menon/Raghavan
- K. V. Shanthi as Leela
- Muthukulam Raghavan Pillai
- Ramachandran
- Bahadoor as Govindan
- Vijaya Lalitha as Radha
- Kamaladevi as Kamakshi
- Nellikode Bhaskaran as Vaasu
- Paravoor Bharathan as Sankaran
- T. K. Balachandran as Ravi
- Sri Narayanapilla
- Ramachandran
- K. Annamma

== Soundtrack ==
The music was composed by G. Devarajan and the lyrics were written by Vayalar Ramavarma.

No.	Song	Singers	Lyrics	Length (m:ss)
1	"Kasthoori Vakappoonkatte"	K. J. Yesudas	Vayalar Ramavarma	
2	"Thamburaattikkoru"	P. Susheela, P. Leela	Vayalar Ramavarma	
3	"Thookkanaamkuruvi"	K. J. Yesudas, S. Janaki	Vayalar Ramavarma	
4	"Velimalayil"	L. R. Eeswari, Kamukara	Vayalar Ramavarma	
5	"Villum Sharavum"	Kamukara, Chorus	Vayalar Ramavarma	
