= Thirichadi =

- Directed by: Kunchacko
- Written by: Kanam E. J. S. L. Puram Sadanandan (dialogues)
- Produced by: M. Kunchacko
- Starring: Prem Nazir; Sheela; Adoor Bhasi; Adoor Pankajam
- Music by: R. Sudarsanam
- Production company: Excel Productions
- Release date: 8 March 1968
- Country: India
- Language: Malayalam

Thirichadi (English: Retaliation) is a 1968 Indian Malayalam-language film, directed and produced by Kunchacko. The film stars Prem Nazir, Sheela, Adoor Bhasi and Adoor Pankajam.

== Cast ==
- Prem Nazir as Kuttappan, Venu (double role)
- Sheela as Ramani
- Adoor Bhasi as Anthappan
- Adoor Pankajam as Ammukutti
- Bahadoor as Gopalan
- Devaki as Kuttappan's mother
- Kaduvakulam Antony as Appunni
- Kottarakkara Sreedharan Nair as Venu's father
- N. Govindankutty as Ramani's father
- Pankajavalli as Bharathi
- S. P. Pillai as P. C. Chacko
- Manavalan Joseph as Naanu Kaniyan
- Kanchana (old)

== Soundtrack ==
The music was composed by R. Sudarsanam and the lyrics were written by Vayalar Ramavarma.

| No. | Song | Singers | Length |
|---|---|---|---|
| 1 | "Indulekhe" (FD) | K. J. Yesudas, P. Susheela | |
| 2 | "Indulekhe" (MD) | K. J. Yesudas, P. Susheela | |
| 3 | "Kadukolam Theeyundengil" | K. J. Yesudas, C. O. Anto | |
| 4 | "Kalppakappoonchola" | K. J. Yesudas, S. Janaki | |
| 5 | "Paathi Vidarnnaal" | P. Susheela | |
| 6 | "Poo Pole" | P. Susheela | |
| 7 | "Vellathaamara Mottu" | K. J. Yesudas, P. Susheela | |
