= Althaara =

1964 film

- Directed by: P. Subramaniam
- Written by: Ponkunnam Varkey
- Screenplay by: Ponkunnam Varkey
- Produced by: P. Subramaniam
- Starring: Prem Nazir; Sheela; Adoor Bhasi; K. S. Gopinath
- Cinematography: E. N. C. Nair
- Edited by: N. Gopalakrishnan
- Music by: M. B. Sreenivasan
- Production company: Neela
- Distributed by: Neela
- Release date: 24 December 1964
- Country: India
- Language: Malayalam

Althaara (transl. Altar) is a 1964 Indian Malayalam-language film, directed and produced by P. Subramaniam. The film stars Prem Nazir, Sheela, Adoor Bhasi and K. S. Gopinath. The film had musical score by M. B. Sreenivasan.

== Cast ==
- Prem Nazir
- Sheela
- Adoor Bhasi
- K. S. Gopinath
- Joseph Chacko
- Kanchana (old)
- Kottarakkara Sreedharan Nair
- Mary
- N. S. Ittan
- Paravoor Bharathan
- S. P. Pillai
- K. V. Shanthi

== Soundtrack ==
The music was composed by M. B. Sreenivasan and the lyrics were written by Thirunayinaarkurichi Madhavan Nair.

No.	Song	Singers	Lyrics	Length (m:ss)
1	"Achaayan Kothichathum"	Chorus, K. P. Udayabhanu	Thirunayinaarkurichi Madhavan Nair	
2	"Deepame Nee Nadathuka"	K. J. Yesudas, Chorus	Thirunayinaarkurichi Madhavan Nair	
3	"Kannezhuthi Pottumthottu"	S. Janaki	Thirunayinaarkurichi Madhavan Nair	
4	"Kanyaamariyame Punyaprakaashame"	S. Janaki, P. Susheela	Thirunayinaarkurichi Madhavan Nair	
5	"Onathumpee Vannaatte"	L. R. Eeswari	Thirunayinaarkurichi Madhavan Nair	
6	"Paathiraappoovonnu Kanthurannaal" (Sad)	S. Janaki, L. R. Eeswari, Kamukara	Thirunayinaarkurichi Madhavan Nair	
7	"Parihaaramillaatha"	Kamukara	Thirunayinaarkurichi Madhavan Nair	
8	"Pathiraappoovonnu Kanthurakkan" (Happy)	S. Janaki, Kamukara	Thirunayinaarkurichi Madhavan Nair	
9	"Varum Oru Naal Sukham"	S. Janaki	Thirunayinaarkurichi Madhavan Nair	
