= Randu Janmam =

- Directed by: Nagavally R. S. Kurup
- Written by: Nagavally R. S. Kurup
- Screenplay by: Nagavally R. S. Kurup
- Starring: M. G. Soman; Ushanandini; Thikkurissy Sukumaran Nair; Veeran
- Cinematography: Ashok Kumar
- Music by: M. G. Radhakrishnan
- Production company: Prasanthi Productions
- Distributed by: Prasanthi Productions
- Release date: 1 September 1978
- Country: India
- Language: Malayalam

Randu Janmam is a 1978 Indian Malayalam-language film, directed by Nagavally R. S. Kurup. The film stars M. G. Soman, Ushanandini, Thikkurissy Sukumaran Nair and Veeran. The film has musical score by MG Radhakrishnan.

== Cast ==
- M. G. Soman
- Ushanandini
- Thikkurissy Sukumaran Nair
- Veeran
- Adoor Bhasi
- KPAC Lalitha
- Sreelatha

== Soundtrack ==
The music was composed by M. G. Radhakrishnan and the lyrics were written by Kavalam Narayana Panicker.

No.	Song	Singers	Lyrics	Length (m:ss)
1	"Adimudi Aninjorungi"	K. J. Yesudas, S. Janaki	Kavalam Narayana Panicker	
2	"Akkaattum Poy"	Sujatha Mohan	Kavalam Narayana Panicker	
3	"Karpoorakkuliraniyum"	K. J. Yesudas	Kavalam Narayana Panicker	
4	"Maamalakkudannayil"	S. Janaki	Kavalam Narayana Panicker	
5	"Ormakal Ormakal"	K. J. Yesudas	Kavalam Narayana Panicker	
6	"Ormakal Ormakal"	Vani Jairam	Kavalam Narayana Panicker	
