= Collector Malathy =

- Directed by: M. Krishnan Nair
- Written by: S. L. Puram Sadanandan
- Produced by: A. K. Subrahmaniam
- Starring: Prem Nazir; Sheela; Ambika; Sukumari
- Cinematography: N. Karthikeyan
- Music by: M. S. Baburaj
- Production company: Saravanabhava Pictures
- Distributed by: Saravanabhava Pictures
- Release date: 14 September 1967
- Country: India
- Language: Malayalam

Collector Malathy is a 1967 Indian Malayalam-language film directed by M. Krishnan Nair and produced by A. K. Subrahmaniam. The film stars Prem Nazir, Sheela, Ambika and Sukumari in the lead roles, with a musical score by M. S. Baburaj.

== Cast ==
- Prem Nazir as Ravi Varma
- Sheela as Malathi
- Ambika as Indu
- Sukumari as Madhavikkutty
- Adoor Bhasi as Kittunni
- Manavalan Joseph as Appoonju
- Pattom Sadan as Sarasan
- Sankaradi as Thirumeni
- Aranmula Ponnamma as Subhadra
- Jayakumari
- Kottarakkara Sreedharan Nair as Thirumeni
- T. S. Muthaiah

== Soundtrack ==
The music was composed by M. S. Baburaj and the lyrics were written by Vayalar Ramavarma.

No.	Song	Singers	Lyrics	Length (m:ss)
1	"Ambalapparambil"	K. J. Yesudas, P. Leela	Vayalar Ramavarma	
2	"Bhaarathappuzhayile"	K. J. Yesudas	Vayalar Ramavarma	
3	"Karuthapenne Ninte"	K. J. Yesudas, P. Susheela	Vayalar Ramavarma	
4	"L.O.V.E. Love Birds"	K. J. Yesudas, L. R. Eeswari, Chorus	Vayalar Ramavarma	
5	"Neelakkoovala Poovukalo"	K. J. Yesudas	Vayalar Ramavarma	
