= Priyathama =

- Directed by: P. Subramaniam
- Written by: Kanam E. J.
- Screenplay by: Kanam E. J.
- Produced by: P. Subramaniam
- Starring: Prem Nazir; Sheela; Shanthi; Adoor Bhasi
- Cinematography: E. N. C. Nair
- Edited by: N. Gopalakrishnan
- Music by: Br Lakshmanan
- Production company: Neela
- Distributed by: Neela
- Release date: 22 December 1966
- Country: India
- Language: Malayalam

Priyathama is a 1966 Indian Malayalam-language film, directed and produced by P. Subramaniam. The film stars Prem Nazir, Sheela, Shanthi and Adoor Bhasi. Br Lakshmanan composed the musical score.

== Cast ==
- Prem Nazir
- Sheela
- Shanthi
- Adoor Bhasi
- Thikkurissy Sukumaran Nair
- Vaikkam Mani
- Aranmula Ponnamma
- Kanchana (old)
- Pankajavalli
- S. P. Pillai

== Soundtrack ==
The music was composed by Br Lakshmanan with lyrics by Sreekumaran Thampi.

No.	Song	Singers	Lyrics	Length (m:ss)
1	"Anuragathinnalakadal"	S. Janaki, P. Leela	Sreekumaran Thampi	
2	"Jeevitham Oru Kochu"	P. B. Sreenivas	Sreekumaran Thampi	
3	"Kanavil Vannen"	P. Susheela	Sreekumaran Thampi	
4	"Kannaadikkadappurathu"	L. R. Eeswari	Sreekumaran Thampi	
5	"Karalin Vaathilil"	K. J. Yesudas, S. Janaki	Sreekumaran Thampi	
6	"Muthe Nammude Muttathum"	P. Leela	Sreekumaran Thampi	
7	"Poovaay Virinjathellam"	Kamukara	Sreekumaran Thampi	
