= Puthri =

- Directed by: P. Subramaniam
- Written by: Kanam E. J.
- Screenplay by: Kanam E. J.
- Produced by: P. Subramaniam
- Starring: Madhu; Thikkurissy Sukumaran Nair; Babu Joseph; Aranmula Ponnamma
- Cinematography: E. N. C. Nair
- Edited by: N. Gopalakrishnan
- Music by: M. B. Sreenivasan
- Production company: Neela
- Distributed by: Neela
- Release date: 4 March 1966
- Country: India
- Language: Malayalam

Puthri is a 1966 Indian Malayalam-language film, directed and produced by P. Subramaniam. The film stars Madhu, Thikkurissy Sukumaran Nair, Babu Joseph and Aranmula Ponnamma. The film had musical score by M. B. Sreenivasan.

== Cast ==
- Madhu
- K. V. Shanthi
- Thikkurissy Sukumaran Nair
- Aranmula Ponnamma
- G. K. Pillai
- Babu Joseph
- Jyothikumar
- Pankajavalli
- S. P. Pillai
- Sarasamma

== Soundtrack ==
The music was composed by M. B. Sreenivasan and the lyrics were written by O. N. V. Kurup.

No.	Song	Singers	Lyrics	Length (m:ss)
1	"Kaanaan Kothichenne"	S. Janaki	O. N. V. Kurup	
2	"Kaattupoovin Kalyaanathinu"	K. J. Yesudas	O. N. V. Kurup	
3	"Kanpeeli"	P. Leela, Kamukara	O. N. V. Kurup	
4	"Paapathin Pushpangal"	Kamukara	O. N. V. Kurup	
5	"Thaazhathe Cholayil"	S. Janaki	O. N. V. Kurup	
6	"Thozhukaithirinaalam"	P. Leela	O. N. V. Kurup	
7	"Vaarmukile Vaarmukile"	Kamukara	O. N. V. Kurup	
8	"Vaarmukile Vaarmukile"	S. Janaki	O. N. V. Kurup	
