= Kasavuthattam =

- Directed by: Kunchacko
- Written by: Thoppil Bhasi
- Screenplay by: Thoppil Bhasi
- Produced by: M. Kunchacko
- Starring: Prem Nazir; Sharada; Adoor Bhasi; Manavalan Joseph
- Cinematography: P. Dathu
- Edited by: Ramaswamy
- Music by: G. Devarajan
- Production company: Excel Productions
- Distributed by: Excel Productions
- Release date: 1 December 1967
- Country: India
- Language: Malayalam

Kasavuthattam is a 1967 Indian Malayalam-language film directed and produced by Kunchacko. The film stars Prem Nazir, Sharada, Adoor Bhasi and Manavalan Joseph in the lead roles. The film has musical score by G. Devarajan.

== Cast ==
- Prem Nazir as Abu
- Sharada as Jameela
- Adoor Bhasi as Khader
- Manavalan Joseph as Thomas
- Jijo
- Bahadoor as Pokkar
- Kottarakkara Sreedharan Nair as Abdukarim Musaliar Muthalali
- Nagu
- Pankajavalli as Musaliar Muthalali's Mother
- Rajeshwari as Amina
- S. P. Pillai as Paarakkoottathil Aliyaar

== Soundtrack ==
The music was composed by G. Devarajan and the lyrics were written by Vayalar Ramavarma.

No.	Song	Singers	Lyrics	Length (m:ss)
1	"Aaluvaappuzhayil Meen"	P. Susheela	Vayalar Ramavarma	
2	"Dhoomarashmithan"	P. B. Sreenivas, Chorus	Vayalar Ramavarma	
3	"Kallukondo Karinkallu"	K. J. Yesudas	Vayalar Ramavarma	
4	"Maanikya Maniyaaya Poomole" (Bit)	B. Vasantha, Chorus	Vayalar Ramavarma	
5	"Mayilppeelikkannu Kondu"	P. Susheela, A. M. Rajah	Vayalar Ramavarma	
6	"Mayilppeelikkannu Kondu" (Sad)	P. Susheela, A. M. Rajah	Vayalar Ramavarma	
7	"Paalkkari Paalkkari"	K. J. Yesudas	Vayalar Ramavarma	
8	"Pandumugalkkottaarathil"	P. Susheela	Vayalar Ramavarma	
