= Randidangazhi (film) =

- Directed by: P. Subramaniam
- Written by: Thakazhi Sivasankara Pillai
- Based on: Randidangazhi by Thakazhi Sivasankara Pillai
- Produced by: P. Subramaniam
- Starring: Miss Kumari; P. J. Antony; T. S. Muthaiah; Thikkurissy Sukumaran Nair; Kottarakkara Sreedharan Nair
- Cinematography: N. S. Mani
- Edited by: K. D. George
- Music by: Br. Lakshman (songs); Thirunayinarkurichi (lyrics)
- Production company: Neela Productions
- Release date: 24 August 1958
- Country: India
- Language: Malayalam

Randidangazhi (transl. Two Measures) is a 1958 Indian Malayalam political film based on the novel of the same name by Thakazhi Sivasankara Pillai and directed by P. Subramaniam with Miss Kumari, P. J. Antony, T. S. Muthaiah, Thikkurissy Sukumaran Nair, Kottarakkara Sreedharan Nair, S. P. Pillai, Bahadoor, Adoor Pankajam, Soman and J. A. R. Anand in the cast. It received a certificate of merit at the National Film Awards.

== Cast ==
- Miss Kumari as Chirutha
- P. J. Antony as Koran
- T. S. Muthaiah as Chathan
- Thikkurissy Sukumaran Nair
- Kottarakkara Sreedharan Nair
- S. P. Pillai, Bahadoor
- Adoor Pankajam
- Soman
- J. A. R. Anand

== Awards ==
National Film Awards

- 1959 - National Film Award for Best Feature Film in Malayalam - Certificate of Merit
