= Amba Ambika Ambalika =

Amba Ambika Ambaalika
- Directed by: P. Subramaniam
- Written by: Nagavally R. S. Kurup (dialogues)
- Screenplay by: Nagavally R. S. Kurup
- Produced by: P. Subramaniam
- Starring: Srividya; Kaviyoor Ponnamma; Hari; Jose Prakash
- Cinematography: M. Masthan; V. Karunakaran
- Edited by: N. Gopalakrishnan
- Music by: G. Devarajan
- Production company: Neela
- Distributed by: Neela
- Release date: 4 September 1976
- Country: India
- Language: Malayalam

Amba Ambika Ambaalika (dubbed into Hindi as Mahayudh) is a 1976 Indian Malayalam film, directed and produced by P. Subramaniam. The film stars Srividya, Kaviyoor Ponnamma, Hari and Jose Prakash in the lead roles. The film has musical score by G. Devarajan. This film was based on Mahabharata.

== Cast ==
- Srividya as Amba
- Rani Chandra as Ambika
- Unnimary as Ambalika
- Ushakumari as Teenage Sathyavathi
- Kaviyoor Ponnamma as Old Age Sathyavathi
- Hari as Devavrathan (Bheeshmar's teenage)
- Jose Prakash as Bheeshmar
- Raghavan as Saalvan
- Sudheer as Vichitravirya
- Kedamangalam Sadanandan
- Prema as Padmavathi
- Ramachandran as Kalinga Raajaavu
- Sankaradi as Fishermen's King
- Anandavally as Maid Lalitha
- C. I. Paul as Emperor Shanthanu
- Kottarakkara Sreedharan Nair as Parashuraman
- Kuthiravattam Pappu as Madhavyan
- Master Sekhar as Sree Murukan
- Pankajavalli as Sathyavathi's Mother
- Vanchiyoor Madhavan Nair

== Soundtrack ==
The music was composed by G. Devarajan and the lyrics were written by Sreekumaran Thampi.

No.	Song	Singers	Lyrics	Length (m:ss)
1	"Chandrakirana Tharangini"	K. J. Yesudas, P. Madhuri, Ambili	Sreekumaran Thampi	
2	"Kaalavrikshathin Dalangal"	K. J. Yesudas	Sreekumaran Thampi	
3	"Muruka Muruka"	P. Madhuri	Sreekumaran Thampi	
4	"Olangale Kunjolangale Odi Va"	P. Madhuri	Sreekumaran Thampi	
5	"Rajakumari"	K. J. Yesudas, P. Madhuri	Sreekumaran Thampi	
6	"Sapthaswarangal Paadum"	P. Susheela, P. Madhuri, Ambili	Sreekumaran Thampi	
7	"Thaazhikakkudangal"	K. J. Yesudas	Sreekumaran Thampi	
