= Aranmula Ponnamma =

Indian actress

- Born: 8 April 1914; Aranmula, Quilon division, Kingdom of Travancore
- Died: 21 February 2011 (aged 96); Thiruvananthapuram, Kerala, India
- Occupation: Actress
- Years active: 1943–2004
- Spouse: Kochu Krishna Pillai
- Children: Rajamma; Rajashekharan
- Parent(s): Malethu Kesava Pillai; Parukutty Amma
- Relatives: Suresh Gopi (Grandson-in-law)
- Awards: 2006 - J.C. Daniel Award for Lifetime Achievement

Aranmula Ponnamma (8 April 1914 – 21 February 2011) was an Indian actress known for her roles as mother of the protagonist in numerous films in a career spanning over five decades. She is widely described as a mother figure in Malayalam cinema. In 2005, she was honoured with the J. C. Daniel Award, Kerala government's highest honour for contributions to Malayalam cinema.

== Early life ==
Ponnamma was born as one of five children of M. Kesava Pillai of the Malethu house and Parukutty Amma in Aranmula, Old Quilon, Travancore (present-day Pathanamthitta district). She has four siblings, Ramakrishna Pillai, Pankiyamma, Bhaskara Pillai and Thankamma. She started her career at the age of 12 as a Carnatic music vocalist. She began by singing before meetings organised by the Hindu Mahamandal on the banks of the Pampa river. At the age of 15, she was appointed as a music teacher in a primary school in Pala, before starting to teach in the senior classes. Later she joined the first batch of students at the Swati Tirunal Music Academy. After the course, she was appointed as the music teacher in Cotton Hill Girls' High School in Trivandrum.

== Family ==
She was married to late Kochu Krishna Pillai. The couple had a daughter, late Rajamma and a son, late Rajashekharan. Her granddaughter Radhika Suresh, herself a singer, is married to Suresh Gopi, and their son actor Gokul Suresh is her great-grandson.

== Career ==
Ponnamma's acting debut happened at the age of 29, in a play titled Bhagyalakshmi. Before making her film debut, she went on to perform in plays like Prasanna, Chechi, Jeevithayathra, and Rakthabandham. Her debut role was that of the mother of the character played by Miss Kumari, a prominent actress at that time, in Sasidharan (1950). The same year she did another role as a mother in the Thikkurissy Sukumaran Nair starrer Amma, which was the first film of noted producer T. E. Vasudevan and also the 18th Malayalam film. In 1968, she acted in the film Viruthan Shanku directed by P. Venu, the first full-length comedy in Malayalam cinema. She was typecasted in mother roles. In her own words: "I did play a negative role in Paadunna Puzha and that of a wayward woman in Yachakan. But after that I was always cast as the mother. As the mother of two children, I was very comfortable in that role. My role model was my mother, Parukutty Amma, who had to look after her five children on her own after my father, Malethu Kesava Pillai, passed away when I was nine. In fact, in Amma, my fifth film, I was merely acting as my mother." In her career spanning over 60 years, she acted as the mother or grandmother of first generation actors like Thikkurissy Sukumaran Nair, second generation actors like Prem Nazir and Sathyan and third generation actors like Mammootty, Mohanlal and Suresh Gopi.

She appeared last in the film Gourisankaram (2004). She died on 21 February 2011, aged 96, at a private hospital in Thiruvananthapuram.

== Awards ==
=== National Film Awards ===
- 1996: Best Supporting Actress - Kathapurushan

=== Kerala State Film Awards ===
- 2005: J. C. Daniel Award
- 1996: Second Best Actress - Kathapurushan

=== Asianet Film Awards ===
- 1998: Lifetime Achievement Award

== Filmography ==
| Year | Title | Role | Notes |
|---|---|---|---|
| 2003 | Gourisankaram | - | |
| 2003 | Swapnam Kondu Thulabharam | Ammu's grandmother | |
| 2000 | Indriyam | Muthassi | |
| | Baalapattangal | Ammoomma | Short film |
| | Parajayathil Patharatha Karmayogi | - | Documentary |
| | Malayala Cinemayude Karnavar | - | Documentary |
| 1997 | Janathipathyam | Thirumupad's mother | |
| 1997 | Lelam | Revathi Thirunal thampuratti | |
| 1996 | Kadhapurushan | Muthassi | |
| 1995 | Sindoorarekha | Muthassi | |
| 1995 | Puthukkottayile Puthumanavalan | Achamma | |
| 1995 | Highway | Vinod's grandmother | |
| 1994 | Tharavadu | Rajani's grandmother | |
| 1994 | Sagaram Sakshi | Devotee | |
| 1994 | Sudhinam | Bhargavi Amma | |
| 1994 | Njan Kodiswaran | Muthassi | |
| 1993 | Maya Mayooram | Narendran's grandmother | |
| 1993 | Aakashadoothu | Annamma | |
| 1993 | Kalipattam | Venu's grandmother | |
| 1992 | Kingini | Mahesh's grandmother | |
| 1992 | Savidam | Ramji's cheriyamma | |
| 1991 | Adwaytham | Muthassi | |
| 1991 | Vishnulokam | Savithri's grandmother | |
| 1990 | Champion Thomas | Valiammachi | |
| 1990 | Purappadu | Elippennu | |
| 1989 | Oru Sayahnathinte Swapnam | Saraswathiyamma | |
| 1989 | Aazhikkoru Muthu | Prabhakarar's mother | |
| 1987 | Kanikanum Neram | Muthassi | |
| 1987 | Achuvettante Veedu | Achuthankutty's Mother | |
| 1987 | Swargam | Jayan's mother | |
| 1986 | Rareeram | Nandakumar's Mother | |
| 1986 | Kaveri | Balu's Mother | |
| 1985 | Madhuvidhu Theerum Munpe | | |
| 1985 | Navadakku Paniyedukku | | |
| 1985 | Vellam | - | |
| 1985 | Puzhayozhugum Vazhi | Hari's Mother | |
| 1985 | Azhiyatha Bandhangal | Meenakshi | |
| 1985 | Pathamudayam | B. G. Menon's Sister | |
| 1984 | Poomadathe Pennu | Muthassi | |
| 1983 | Prem Nazirine Kanmanilla | Herself | |
| 1983 | Ahankaram | Sreedevi | |
| 1983 | Pallankuzhi | | |
| 1983 | Enne Njan Thedunnu | Parukuttyamma | |
| 1983 | Bandham | Muthassi | |
| 1982 | Vazhvey Maayam | Paatti | Tamil film Dubbed for herself in Malayalam dubbed version "Premabhishekam" also |
| 1982 | Yagam | | |
| 1982 | Ee Nadu | Parvathiyamma | |
| 1982 | Drohi | | |
| 1982 | Ente Shathrukkal | | |
| 1982 | Ithum Oru Jeevitham | Madhavi | |
| 1981 | Archana Teacher | Sukumaran's aunt | |
| 1981 | Ira Thedunna Manushyar | | |
| 1981 | Manassinte Theerthayathra | Muthassi | |
| 1981 | Sneham Oru Pravaaham | | |
| 1981 | Arikkari Ammu | | |
| 1981 | Dhanya | | |
| 1981 | Aakramanam | Devakiyamma | |
| 1981 | Neruppile Pootha Malar | | Tamil movie |
| 1980 | Ambalavilakku | Savithri's Mother-in-law | |
| 1980 | Thirayum Theeravum | Muthassi | |
| 1980 | Makaravilakku | | |
| 1980 | Oppol | | |
| 1980 | Theekadal | Balakrishnan's Mother | |
| 1980 | Avan Oru Ahankari | | |
| 1980 | Swantham Enna Padam | Sunil's grandmother | |
| 1980 | Seetha | | |
| 1979 | Lajjavathi | | |
| 1979 | Rajaveedhi | | |
| 1979 | Bharyaye Aavashyamundu | | |
| 1979 | Prabhathasandhya | | |
| 1979 | Amrithachumbanam | | |
| 1979 | Oru Ragam Pala Thalam | | |
| 1979 | Venalil Oru Mazha | | |
| 1979 | Enikku Njaan Swantham | Madhavankutty's mother | |
| 1979 | Tharangam | Madhu's mother | |
| 1979 | Ivide Kattinu Sugantham | Pushkaran's grandmother | |
| 1979 | Sayoojyam | Saraswathy | |
| 1978 | Aanappachan | Sarojiniyamma | |
| 1978 | Premashilpi | Prakash's mother | |
| 1978 | Uthradarathri | - | |
| 1978 | Hemantharathri | - | |
| 1978 | Avar Jeevikkunnu | | |
| 1978 | Kodiyettam | Neighbour | |
| 1978 | Rowdy Ramu | Lakshmykuttyamma | |
| 1978 | Urakkam Varatha Rathrikal | | |
| 1978 | Naalumanippookkal | | |
| 1978 | Rapadikalude Gatha | | |
| 1978 | Njan Njan Mathram | | |
| 1978 | Padasaram | Bhavani | |
| 1978 | Ahalya | | |
| 1978 | Kaithappo | - | |
| 1977 | Yudhakandam | Amma | |
| 1977 | Sathyavan Savithri | - | |
| 1977 | Vidarunna Mottukal | Gopal's mother | |
| 1977 | Sree Murukan | Bharathi | |
| 1976 | Hridayam Oru Kshethram | Ramesh's mother | |
| 1975 | Makkal | Gouriyamma | |
| 1975 | Sathyathinte Nizhalil | - | |
| 1975 | Swami Ayyappan | | |
| 1974 | Youvanam | Ravi's mother | |
| 1974 | Devi Kanyakumari | - | |
| 1973 | Swapnam | Viswanathan's mother | |
| 1973 | Ponnapuram Kotta | Kunjikanni | |
| 1972 | Sree Guruvayoorappan | - | |
| 1972 | Prathikaram | Raju's mother | |
| 1971 | Muthassi | Muthassi | |
| 1971 | Kochaniyathi | Mohan's Mother | |
| 1970 | Engirundho Vandhaal | Shanthavalli | Tamil film |
| 1970 | Kurukshethram | | |
| 1970 | Pearl View | Pristina | |
| 1970 | Sthree | Devakiyamma | |
| 1970 | Madhuvidhu | Gopi's Mother | |
| 1970 | Ambalapravu | Saraswathiyamma | |
| 1970 | Lottery Ticket | | |
| 1970 | Dathuputhran | Kunjachan's mother | |
| 1970 | Cross Belt | Ammukuttiyamma | |
| 1970 | Thara | Kamalamma | |
| 1970 | Nilakkatha Chalanangal | | |
| 1969 | Mannippu | Dhanam Ammal | Tamil Film |
| 1969 | Padicha Kallan | Saraswathiyamma | |
| 1969 | Jwala | Saraswathiyamma | |
| 1969 | Poojapushppam | - | |
| 1969 | Susi | Thresiamma | |
| 1969 | Vila Kuranja Manushyan | | |
| 1969 | Kumara Sambhavam | Minavati | |
| 1968 | Adhyapika | - | |
| 1968 | Love In Kerala | Mother of Chandran and Shankar | |
| 1968 | Agnipareeksha | Mohan's Mother | |
| 1968 | Padunna Puzha | Bhanumathiyamma | |
| 1968 | Kodugalooramma | Kavunthi | |
| 1968 | Vidyarthi | | |
| 1968 | Hotel High Range | Ramesh's mother | |
| 1968 | Midumidukki | - | |
| 1968 | Viruthan Shanku | Kunjulakshmi | |
| 1967 | Lady Doctor | Shoshamma | |
| 1967 | Collector Malathi | Subhadramma | |
| 1967 | Agniputhri | Saraswathi | |
| 1967 | Kavalam Chundan | Saraswathi Kunjamma | |
| 1967 | Pavapettaval | Bhavaniyamma | |
| 1967 | Pareeksha | Lakshmi | |
| 1966 | Priyathama | - | |
| 1966 | Tharavattamma | Lakshmiyamma | |
| 1966 | Archana | Meenakshiyamma/Rajagopalan's Mother | |
| 1966 | Koottukar | Kunjamma | |
| 1966 | Puthri | Layamma | |
| 1966 | Archana | Meenakshiyamma | |
| 1965 | Mayavi | Raghu's mother | |
| 1965 | Muthalali | Saraswathiyamma | |
| 1965 | Kaliyodam | Janakiyamma | |
| 1965 | Shakunthala | Gauthami | |
| 1964 | Atom Bomb | Janaki | |
| 1964 | Manavatti | Babu's mother | |
| 1964 | Kudumbini | Parukuttiyamma | |
| 1964 | Bharthavu | Kalyaniyamma | |
| 1964 | Karuthakai | Radha's aunt | |
| 1964 | Kalajukittiya Thankam | Sharada | |
| 1964 | School Master | Jaanu | |
| 1963 | Kalayum Kaminiyum | Usha's mother | |
| 1963 | Kaattu Maina | - | |
| 1962 | Snehadeepam | Kalyani | |
| 1962 | Veluthambi Dalawa | Dalawa's mother | |
| 1962 | Sreeramapattabhisekham | Kausalya | |
| 1962 | Kalpadukal | Antharjanam | |
| 1962 | Viyarppinte Vila | Amma | |
| 1961 | FACT | | Documentary |
| 1961 | Kandam Becha Kottu | Amina | |
| 1961 | Umminithanka | Abhirama | |
| 1961 | Bhakta Kuchela | Yashoda | |
| 1961 | Jnana Sundari | Maharani | |
| 1961 | Christmas Rathri | Annamma | |
| 1960 | Poothali | Madhan Menon's sister | |
| 1958 | Mariakutty | Achamma | |
| 1957 | Padathapainkili | Kunjandamma | |
| 1957 | Thaskaraveeran | SanthaLa | |
| 1956 | Koodapirappu | - | |
| 1956 | Manthravadi | Susheeladevi | |
| 1956 | Avar Unarunnu | Bharathi | |
| 1955 | Aniyathi | Kalyaniyamma | |
| 1955 | Kaalam Maarunnu | | |
| 1954 | Balyasakhi | Parvathiyamma | |
| 1953 | Asai Magan | | Tamil film |
| 1953 | Ponkathir | Madhu's mother | |
| 1953 | Ashadeepam | Lakshmiyamma | |
| 1953 | Lokaneedhi | Devakiyamma | |
| 1952 | Amma | Lakshmiyamma | |
| 1952 | Kaanchana | Ponnammal | |
| 1952 | Aathmashanthi | Janakiyamma | |
| 1951 | Yachakan | Anandam | |
| 1950 | Chechi | Kankam | |
| 1950 | Chandrika | Saralabhai | |
| 1950 | Sasidharan | Kalyaniyamma | |

== Television ==
- Akashadoothu (Surya TV) - 2011
- Kadamattathu Kathanar (Asianet) - 2004
- Chuvappu Naada
- Akshayapaathram
- Mangalyasoothram

== Dramas ==
- Bhagyalakshmi
- Rakthabandham
- Chechi
- Jeevithayathra
- Prasanna
- Randu Janmam
