= Bhagyajathakam =

1962 film

- Directed by: P. Bhaskaran
- Written by: P. Bhaskaran; Jagathy N. K. Achari (dialogues)
- Screenplay by: Jagathy N. K. Achari
- Produced by: P. Bhaskaran; B. N. Kondareddy
- Starring: Sathyan; Sheela; Adoor Bhasi; Sam
- Cinematography: D. V. Rajaram
- Edited by: T. T. Kripasankar
- Music by: M. S. Baburaj; Irayimman Thampi; Thyagaraja
- Release date: 16 November 1962
- Country: India
- Language: malayalam

Bhagyajathakam (transl. The Lucky Horoscope) is a 1962 Indian Malayalam film, directed and produced by P. Bhaskaran. The film stars Sathyan, Sheela (Debut), Adoor Bhasi and Sam in lead roles. The film had musical score by M. S. Baburaj, Irayimman Thampi, P. Bhaskaran and Thyagaraja.

== Cast ==
- Sathyan
- Sheela (Debut)
- Adoor Bhasi
- Sam
- T. S. Muthaiah
- Thomas
- Adoor Bhavani
- Adoor Pankajam
- Ali
- Bahadoor
- Chithradevi
- J. N. Rajam
- Kottarakkara Sreedharan Nair
- M. G. Menon
- Nanukkuttan
- Pankajavalli

== Soundtrack ==
The music was composed by M. S. Baburaj, Irayimman Thampi and Thyagaraja and the lyrics were written by P. Bhaskaran, Irayimman Thampi and Thyagaraja.

No.	Song	Singers	Lyrics	Length (m:ss)
1	"Aadyathe Kanmani"	K. J. Yesudas, P. Leela	P. Bhaskaran	
2	"Anuraagakkodathiyil"	Mehboob	P. Bhaskaran	
3	"En Penninalpam"	Mehboob	P. Bhaskaran	
4	"Kannukalil Kavanayumaay"	Kottayam Santha, Mehboob	P. Bhaskaran	
5	"Karuna Chaivaanenthu Thaamasam"	Sudhan	Irayimman Thampi	
6	"Maanodothu Valarnilla"	K. Jamuna Rani	P. Bhaskaran	
7	"Nolkkaatha Noyambu"	P. Leela	P. Bhaskaran	
8	"Om Jeevithaananda"	Chorus, Mehboob	P. Bhaskaran	
9	"Parayaan Vayyallo"	K. J. Yesudas	P. Bhaskaran	
10	"Vaasudevakeerthanam" (Vaasavathi)	K. J. Yesudas, Paramasivan Bhagavathar	Thyagaraja	
