= Kottarakkara Sreedharan Nair =

Indian actor (1922–1986)

- Born: N. Sreedharan Nair; 11 September 1922; Kottarakkara, Quilon, Travancore (present-day Kollam, Kerala)
- Died: 19 October 1986 (aged 64); Thiruvananthapuram, Kerala, India
- Years active: 1950–1986
- Spouse: Vijayalakshmi Amma
- Children: 8, including Shobha Mohan and Sai Kumar
- Parent(s): Narayana Pillai; Ummini Amma

N. Sreedharan Nair (11 September 1922 – 19 October 1986), popularly known as Kottarakkara Sreedharan Nair or just Kottarakkara, was an Indian actor, born as the son of Narayana Pillai and Ummini Amma in Kollam district, Kerala. He appeared in Malayalam movies. He is regarded as one of the original actors of all time in Malayalam movies.

Sreedharan Nair won two Kerala state film awards. In 1970, he won the best actor award and in 1969 the second best actor award.

He is best remembered for his role as Chempankunju in the national award winning film Chemmeen directed by Ramu Kariat. Other impressive performances were in the films Veluthampi Dalava (as Veluthampi Dalava), Thommante Makkal (1965) as Thomman, and Pazhassi Raja (1964) as Pazhassi Raja, Viruthan Shanku (1968) by P. Venu. Sreedharan Nair is also known for playing the role of devil magician in the 1984 fantasy film My Dear Kuttichathan. Popular Malayalam actor Saikumar is his son.

== Personal life ==
Sreedharan Nair was born in 1922 to Padinjattinkara Korattiyode Narayana Pillai and Ummini Amma. He had his primary education from Eswara vilasam higher secondary school. He started acting in dramas at the age of 10. He owned drama troupes Jayasree and Kalamandiram.

He was known to be a very outspoken, stubborn man with a short temper. Once, he walked out of the set of Ara Nazhika Neram due to some disputes. He did not allow anyone seeking compromise to open the gate and enter into his house compound to discuss with him. When everyone was afraid to talk to him, someone suggested that actor Sathyan should approach Sreedharan Nair to resolve the issue. After talking with Sathyan, Sreedharan Nair set aside the disputes & agreed to act in the movie.

Sreedharan Nair married Vijayalakshmi Amma. They had eight children, Jaysree, Geetha, Laila, Shobha, Kala, Sai Kumar, Beena, and Shaila. His son Sai Kumar, daughters Shobha Mohan, and Sylaja, son-in-law Mohan Kumar, grandchildren Anil Pappan, Vinu Mohan, Anu Mohan, Vaishnavi Saikumar and great-grandson Kailasveswar S Nair are all film/TV actors.

== Awards ==
- 1970 Kerala State Film Award for Best Actor -Ara Nazhika Neram
- 1969 Kerala State Film Award for Second Best Actor – Koottukudumbam

== Filmography ==
=== Malayalam ===
Year	Title	Role	Notes
1950	Prasanna		
1950	Sasidharan	Rajasekharan	
1950	Chechi		
1951	Yachakan		
1952	Aathmasanthi		
1953	Lokaneethi		
1954	Snehaseema	Dr. Baby	
1954	Kidappadam		
1954	Manasakshi		
1954	Avan Varunnu		
1954	Avakashi	Prathapan	
1955	Aniyathi	Pachu Kurup	
1955	Kalam Marunnu		
1955	C.I.D.	Vallabhan	
1956	Manthravadi	Mahedran	
1956	Aathmaarpanam		
1957	Jailppulli	Madhu	
1957	Padatha Painkili	Vendor Kutti	
1958	Thaskaraveeran	Vijayan	
1958	Randidangazhi		
1958	Mariakutty	Kora	
1959	Minnalppadayaali		
1959	Nadodikal		
1960	Sthree Hridayam		
1960	Poothali		
1961	Shri Sabarimalai Shri Ayaappan		
1961	Umminithanka	Marthanda Varma	
1961	Bhakta Kuchela	Sisupala	
1961	Christmas Rathri	Valyedathu Vareechan	
1962	Laila Majnu		
1962	Snehadeepam	Sankar	
1962	Bhagyajathakam		
1962	Sreekovil		
1962	Puthiya Akasam Puthiya Bhoomi	Johnson	
1962	Sreerama Pattabhishekam	Ravanan	
1962	Veluthambi Dalawa	Veluthambi Dalawa	
1963	Kadalamma	Jayarajan	
1963	Snapaka Yohannan	Naman	
1963	Sathyabhama		
1963	Rebecca		
1963	Nithyakanyaka		
1964	Devalayam		
1964	Anna		
1964	Althaara		
1964	Pazhassi Raja	Pazhassi Raja	
1965	Sarpakadu	Temple Priest	
1965	Mayavi	Prathapan	
1965	Kattuthulasi		
1965	Pattuthoovaala	Francis	
1965	Shyamala Chechi		
1965	Thommante Makkal	Thomachan	
1965	Chemmeen	Chembankunju	
1965	Shakuntala		
1965	Inapraavugal	Kuncheria	
1965	Kalyana Photo		
1966	Jail		
1966	Mayor Nair		
1966	Kanmanikal		
1966	Anarkali	Mana Singhan	
1966	Koottukar	Mammootty	
1966	Kalyana Rathriyil	KB Nair	
1966	Pennmakkal		
1966	Thilottama		
1966	Kunjali Marakkar	Kunjali Marakkar	
1966	Rowdy		
1967	Collector Malathy	Thirumeni	
1967	Jeevikkan Anuvadikku		
1967	Lady Doctor		
1967	Cochin Express	Gangster	
1967	Mynatharuvi Kolakase		
1967	Balyakalasakhi		
1967	Pooja		
1967	Kasavuthattam	Abdukarim Musaliar	
1967	Kottayam Kolacase		
1967	Ollathumathi		
1968	Hotel High Range	Dhanesh	
1968	Midumidukki		
1968	Kodungallooramma	Pandya Rajavu	
1968	Thirichadi	Venu's father	
1968	Viruthan Shanku	Ukkannanunni Nair	
1968	Adhyapika		
1968	Punnapra Vayalar	Neelakandan	
1969	Jwala	Kunjomana's father	
1969	Janmabhoomi	Mathai	
1969	Koottukudumbam	Ilanjikkal Rama Kurup	
1969	Nurse		
1969	Vilakuranja Manushyan		
1969	Aalmaram	Kesava Pillai	
1969	Soosi	Chacko Sir	
1969	Kumara Sambhavam	Dakshan	
1970	Detective 909 Keralathil		
1970	Cross Belt	D.Y.S.P.	
1970	Kakkathamburatti	Kunju Panikkan	
1970	Sabarimala Sree Dharmashastha		
1970	Kurukshethram		
1970	Aranazhikaneram	Kunjenachan	
1970	Pearl View	Mariyan	
1971	Gangasangamam		
1971	Makane Ninakku Vendi	Mathachan	
1971	Jalakanyaka		
1971	Puthenveedu		
1972	Pulliman		
1972	Panimudakku	Sethuraman	
1972	Chhayam		
1972	Ananthasayanam		
1972	Professor	Vasumathi's Father	
1972	Sree Guruvayoorappan		
1972	Chembarathi	Sankaran	
1972	Thottilla	Karamachandran	
1972	Achanum Bappayum	Krishnan	
1973	Mazhakaaru	Panikkar	
1973	Dharmayudham	Puthumadam KR Iyyer	
1973	Driksakshi	Menon	
1973	Swargaputhri	Thomachan	
1973	Achani	Raghavan Muthalali	
1973	Swapnam		
1973	Nirmalyam	Variyar	
1973	Yamini	Indira's Father	
1973	Padmavyooham	Ummachan	
1973	Checkpost		
1973	Pacha Nottukal	Rappael	
1973	Chenda		
1973	Enippadikal		
1973	Thottavadi	Vaasu Pilla	
1973	Darsanam		
1973	Chuzhi		
1973	Kaadu	Menon	
1973	Thekkan Kattu	Chacko Vakeel	
1973	Gayathri		
1974	Athidhi		
1974	Devi Kanyakumari	Padmavathi's husband	
1974	Chanchala		
1974	Nellu	Chundeli	
1975	Prayanam	Bharathan	
1975	Akkaldaama		
1975	Kaamam Krodham Moham		
1976	Panchami	Rangan Mooppan	
1976	Amba Ambika Ambalika	Parashuraman	
1976	Colonel And Collector		
1976	Paalkkadal	PN Menon	
1977	Vezhambal	Stanley Jose	
1977	Sreemurukan	Nambi Rajavu	
1978	Priyadarshini	Peruvarum Chandrasekhar	
1978	Paadasaram	Poomangalathu Unnithan	
1979	Neeyo Njaano	Maayyandi	
1979	Radha Enna Pennkutti	Radha's father	
1980	Vedikettu		
1980	Kadalkkaattu	Fernandez	
1980	Raagam Thaanam Pallavi	Marar	
1980	Kalika	Appachan	
1981	Parvathy	Thampuran	
1981	Manassinte Theerthayathra		
1982	Ithum Oru Jeevitham	Old man	
1982	Kazhumaram		
1982	Snehapoorvam Meera		
1983	Purappadu		
1984	Sabarimala Darshanam		
1984	My Dear Kuttichathan	The Cruel Magician	
1985	Dheivatheyorthu		
1986	Chilambu	Grandfather	
1986	Mizhineerppoovukal	Priest	

=== Kannada ===
- 1968 - Bangalore Mail

== See also ==
- National Film Awards
- Kerala State Film Awards
- Chemmeen
- Sai Kumar
