= Urangatha Sundary =

- Directed by: P. Subramaniam
- Written by: Sree
- Screenplay by: Sree
- Produced by: P. Subramaniam
- Starring: Sathyan; Rajasree; K. V. Shanthi; Jayabharathi
- Cinematography: E. N. C. Nair
- Edited by: N. Gopalakrishnan
- Music by: G. Devarajan
- Production company: Neela Productions
- Distributed by: Neela
- Release date: 1969
- Country: India
- Language: Malayalam

Urangatha Sundari (transl. Sleepless beauty) is a 1969 Indian Malayalam-language romantic psychological thriller film directed and produced by P. Subramaniam. It is a remake of Alfred Hitchcock's film Rebecca (1940). The film stars Sathyan, Rajasree, K. V. Shanthi and Jayabharathi in the lead roles. The film had musical score by G. Devarajan.

== Plot ==
Prabhavathi meets rich Vikraman Karthavu and they both fall in love and get married. Vikraman brings Prabhavathi to his home - A huge imposing mansion in the middle of Moors. Prabhavathi learns from servants about Vikraman's first wife Vilasini who died in mysterious circumstances about a year ago. The housekeeper who was also the nanny of Vilasini is visibly disturbed by this and is cold towards Prabhavathi. Vikraman leaves on a business trip for a few weeks and Prabavathi is left to herself. This is when she encounters supernatural phenomena in the mansion and is haunted by the memories and spirit of Vilasini. Recovering from shock, Prabavathi decides to do her own investigation of Vilasini's mysterious death. One by one she uncovers shocking dark secrets about Vilasini, Vikraman and various other people.

== Cast ==
- Sathyan as Vikraman Kartha
- Rajasree as Vilasini
- K. V. Shanthi as Prabhavathi
- Jayabharathi as Madhumathi
- Adoor Pankajam as Madhavi
- Bahadoor as Panicker
- K. P. Ummer as Sudhakaran
- Karamana Janardanan Nair as Advocate John
- Nellikode Bhaskaran as Purushothaman
- Pankajavalli as Ammavi
- S. P. Pillai as Madman

== Soundtrack ==
The music was composed by G. Devarajan and the lyrics were written by Vayalar Ramavarma.

No.	Song	Singers	Lyrics	Length (m:ss)
1	"Chandanakkallil"	P. Susheela	Vayalar Ramavarma	
2	"Enikkum Braanthu"	Kamukara	Vayalar Ramavarma	
3	"Gorochanam Kondu"	P. Leela	Vayalar Ramavarma]	
4	"Paalaazhi Madhanam"	P. Susheela	Vayalar Ramavarma	
5	"Paalaazhi Madhanam"	K. J. Yesudas	Vayalar Ramavarma	
6	"Paathiraappakshikale"	P. Susheela	Vayalar Ramavarma	
7	"Priyadarshini"	K. J. Yesudas, B. Vasantha	Vayalar Ramavarma	
