= Hridhayathinte Nirangal =

- Directed by: P. Subramaniam
- Written by: Nagavally R. S. Kurup
- Screenplay by: Nagavally R. S. Kurup
- Based on: Naanum Oru Penn
- Produced by: P. Subramaniam
- Starring: Madhu; Thikkurissy Sukumaran Nair; Raghavan; Unnimary
- Cinematography: N. A. Thara
- Edited by: Hrishikesh Mukherjee
- Music by: G. Devarajan; R. Sudarsanam
- Production company: Neela
- Distributed by: Neela
- Release date: 13 May 1979
- Country: India
- Language: Malayalam

Hridhayathinte Nirangal (transl. Colours of Heart) is a 1979 Indian Malayalam-language film, directed and produced by P. Subramaniam and starring Madhu, Thikkurissy Sukumaran Nair, Raghavan and Unnimary. The film has a musical score by G. Devarajan and R. Sudarsanam. The film was a remake of the Tamil film Naanum Oru Penn an adaptation of Sri Shailesh Dey's Bengali play Bodhu.

== Cast ==
- Madhu
- Thikkurissy Sukumaran Nair
- Raghavan
- Unnimary
- Jayaprabha
- Mallika Sukumaran

== Soundtrack ==
The music was composed by G. Devarajan and R Sudarsanam and the lyrics were written by Sreekumaran Thampi.

No.	Song	Singers	Lyrics	Length (m:ss)
1	"Aaromal Janichillallo"	K. J. Yesudas	Sreekumaran Thampi	
2	"Inangiyaalum Soundaryam"		Sreekumaran Thampi	
3	"Kanna Kaarmukil Varnna"	P. Susheela	Sreekumaran Thampi	
4	"Oru Gaana Veechika"	P. Jayachandran	Sreekumaran Thampi	
5	"Oru Gaana Veechika"	P. Madhuri	Sreekumaran Thampi	
6	"Poo Pole Poo Pole"	P. Jayachandran, P. Madhuri	Sreekumaran Thampi	
7	"Sankalpathinte"	K. J. Yesudas, P. Madhuri	[Sreekumaran Thampi	
