= Pankajavalli =

Indian Malayalam actress

- Born: Chengannur, Alappuzha, Kerala, India
- Occupation: Film actor
- Years active: 1951-1984
- Spouse: Nanukuttan (Deceased)
- Children: 3
- Relatives: Kaveri (granddaughter)

Pankajavalli is an Indian former actress in Malayalam movies. She was known for her supporting roles during the late 1960s and 1970s in Malayalam. She made her debut in Jeevitha Nouka in 1951. She has acted in more than 50 movies. Her granddaughter Kaveri is also an actress in Tamil and Malayalam movies.

== Personal life ==
Pankajavalli hails from Chengannur, Alappuzha. She is married to comedy actor and Mridangam player Nanukuttan. They have three children.

== Filmography ==
| Year | Title | Role | Notes |
|---|---|---|---|
| 1951 | Jeevitha Nouka | | |
| 1952 | Achan | | |
| 1952 | Aathmasakhi | | |
| 1952 | Visappinte Vili | | |
| 1953 | Velakkaran | | |
| 1953 | Lokaneethi | | |
| 1953 | Ashadeepam | Bhanu Amma | |
| 1954 | Avakasi | Madhavi | |
| 1955 | Kalam Marunnu | | |
| 1957 | Padatha Painkili | Kocheli | |
| 1958 | Mariakutty | Annamma | |
| 1958 | Nairu Pidicha Pulivalu | Kalyani | |
| 1960 | Poothali | | |
| 1961 | Christmas Rathri | Thresiamma | |
| 1961 | Jnaanasundari | Jnanasundari's stepmother | |
| 1961 | Kandam Becha Kottu | Khadeeja | |
| 1962 | Snehadeepam | Devakiyamma | |
| 1962 | Bhagyajathakam | | |
| 1963 | Snapaka Yohannan | Herodias | |
| 1964 | Oral Koodi Kallanayi | Karthi | |
| 1964 | School Master | Bhavaniyamma | |
| 1964 | Omanakuttan | | |
| 1964 | Ayisha | | |
| 1965 | Pattuthoovaala | Annakutti | |
| 1965 | Kaliyodam | Bhargaviyamma | |
| 1966 | Kusruthykuttan | Lakshmi's mother | |
| 1966 | Puthri | Deenamma | |
| 1966 | Sthanarthi Saramma | Mariyamma | |
| 1966 | Kanakachilanka | | |
| 1966 | Priyathama | | |
| 1966 | Rowdy | | |
| 1967 | Kudumbam | | |
| 1967 | Kasavuthattam | Musaliar's mother | |
| 1967 | Kavalam Chundan | | |
| 1967 | Mynatharuvi Kolakase | | |
| 1967 | Sahadharmini | | |
| 1967 | Lady Doctor | Eliyamma | |
| 1968 | Thirichadi | | |
| 1968 | Punnapra Vayalar | Prabhakaran's mother | |
| 1968 | Anchu Sundarikal | | |
| 1969 | Kumara Sambhavam | Veerani | |
| 1969 | Urangatha Sundary | Ammayi | |
| 1969 | Jwala | Meenakshi | |
| 1969 | Nurse | | |
| 1970 | Dathuputhran | Rahel | |
| 1970 | Thara | Matron | |
| 1970 | Othenente Makan | Unnichara | |
| 1970 | Madhuvidhu | Kalyaniyamma | |
| 1971 | Kochaniyathi | Bhavani | |
| 1971 | Boban and Molly | | |
| 1974 | Thumbolarcha | Thumbolarcha's mother | |
| 1976 | Amba Ambika Ambalika | Sathyavathi's mother | |
| 1977 | Vezhambal | | |
| 1978 | Onappudava | | |
| 1984 | Ethirppukal | | |
