= Prathikaram =

- Directed by: Kumar
- Written by: T Rao; Kedamangalam Sadanandan (dialogues)
- Starring: Jayabharathi; Thikkurissy Sukumaran Nair; Alummoodan; C. L. Anandan
- Music by: M. B. Sreenivasan
- Production company: Sreekumar Productions
- Distributed by: Sreekumar Productions
- Release date: 14 January 1972
- Country: India
- Language: Malayalam

Prathikaram (transl. Revenge) is a 1972 Indian Malayalam-language revenge drama film, directed by Kumar. The film stars Jayabharathi, Thikkurissy Sukumaran Nair, Alummoodan and C. L. Anandan. The film's score was composed by M. B. Sreenivasan.

== Cast ==
- Jayabharathi as Shobha
- Thikkurissy Sukumaran Nair as Pankajakshan Nair
- Alummoodan as Peethambharan
- C. L. Anandan as Raju, Soman
- Aranmula Ponnamma as Raju's mother
- Kanchana (old)
- S. P. Pillai as Shobha's father
- Jose Prakash as Sreedharan Thampi
- Adoor Pankajam as Kamalam
- K. V. Shanthi as Vimala
- Baby Sumathi as Leela
- Kamal Haasan Uncredited role of a Punjabi singer in a song

== Production ==
Prathikaram film produced by Sreekumar Productions. This film was shot in black-and-white. It was given an "U" (Unrestricted) certificate by the Central Board of Film Certification. The final length of the film was 4,009.33 metres (13,154.0 ft).

== Soundtrack ==
The music was composed by M. B. Sreenivasan with lyrics by Sreekumaran Thampi.

No.	Song	Singers	Lyrics	Length (m:ss)
1	"Chirichappol"	K. J. Yesudas, Aruna	Sreekumaran Thampi	
2	"Madhuram Madhuram"	L. R. Eeswari	Sreekumaran Thampi	
3	"Suve Wazire Waaliyaan"	S. Janaki, P. B. Sreenivas		
4	"Swapnam Kaanukayo"	S. Janaki	Sreekumaran Thampi	
