= Madhuvidhu =

- Directed by: N. Sankaran Nair
- Written by: Babu Nanthancode; Muttathu Varkey (dialogues)
- Screenplay by: Muttathu Varkey
- Produced by: P. Subramaniam
- Starring: Jayabharathi; Jose Prakash; Maya; Prameela
- Cinematography: E. N. C. Nair
- Edited by: N. Gopalakrishnan
- Music by: M. B. Sreenivasan
- Production company: Sreekumar Productions
- Distributed by: Sreekumar Productions
- Release date: 15 October 1970
- Country: India
- Language: Malayalam

Madhuvidhu (transl. Honeymoon) is a 1970 Indian Malayalam film, directed by N. Sankaran Nair and produced by P. Subramaniam. The film stars Jayabharathi, Jose Prakash, Maya and Prameela in the lead roles. The film had musical score by M. B. Sreenivasan.

== Ploy ==
A wealthy heir named Gopi squanders his inheritance on a reckless lifestyle of alcohol and womanizing until his life changes completely upon meeting his exact lookalike, Madhu.

== Cast ==
- Vincent
- Geethanjali
- K. V. Shanthi
- Jayabharathi
- S. P. Pillai
- Nellikode Bhaskaran
- Jose Prakash
- Aranmula Ponnamma
- Alummoodan
- Pankajavalli
- Maya
- Prameela
- Annamma
- KPAC Sunny
- Mala Aravindan
- Philip
- Sarasamma

== Soundtrack ==
All lyrics are written by O. N. V. Kurup; all music is composed by M. B. Sreenivasan.

Track listing
No.	Title	Artist(s)	Length
1.	"Aathirakkulirulla"	S. Janaki
2.	"Oru Madhuraswapnamalla"	K. J. Yesudas
3.	"Raavu Maayum Nilaavu Maayum"	K. J. Yesudas
4.	"Ulsavam Madirolsavam"	L. R. Eswari
5.	"Yamunaatheeravihaari"	S. Janaki
