= Pattuthoovaala =

1965 film by P. Subramaniam

- Directed by: P. Subramaniam
- Written by: Muttathu Varkey
- Screenplay by: Muttathu Varkey
- Produced by: P. Subramaniam
- Starring: Madhu; Sheela; Adoor Bhasi; Kanchana (old)
- Cinematography: E. N. C. Nair
- Edited by: N. Gopalakrishnan
- Music by: G. Devarajan
- Production company: Neela
- Distributed by: Neela
- Release date: 20 November 1965
- Country: India
- Language: Malayalam

Pattuthoovaala (transl. Silk Handkerchief) is a 1965 Indian Malayalam-language film, directed and produced by P. Subramaniam. The film stars Madhu, Sheela, Adoor Bhasi and Kanchana (old). The film had musical score by G. Devarajan.

== Cast ==
- Madhu
- Sheela
- Adoor Bhasi
- Kanchana (old)
- Kottarakkara Sreedharan Nair
- Laila
- Nellikode Bhaskaran
- Pankajavalli
- Philomina
- S. P. Pillai
- K. V. Shanthi

== Soundtrack ==
The music was composed by G. Devarajan with lyrics by Vayalar Ramavarma.

No.	Song	Singers	Lyrics	Length (m:ss)
1	"Aakaashappoykayil"	P. Susheela, Kamukara	Vayalar Ramavarma	
2	"Kannil Neelakkayaampoo"	L. R. Eeswari	Vayalar Ramavarma	
3	"Maanathe Pichakkaaranu"	Kamukara, L. R. Anjali	Vayalar Ramavarma	
4	"Pookkal Nalla Pokkal"	L. R. Eeswari	Vayalar Ramavarma	
5	"Pottikkarayikkaan Maathram"	P. Susheela, Kamukara	Vayalar Ramavarma	
6	"Shabdasaagara Puthrikale"	P. Susheela	Vayalar Ramavarma	
