= Midumidukki =

- Directed by: Crossbelt Mani
- Written by: K. G. Sethunath
- Screenplay by: K. G. Sethunath
- Produced by: Ponnappan
- Starring: Sathyan; Sharada; Adoor Bhasi; Hari
- Edited by: K. D. George
- Music by: M. S. Baburaj
- Production company: Deepthi Films
- Distributed by: Deepthi Films
- Release date: 14 September 1968
- Country: India
- Language: Malayalam

Midumidukki is a 1968 Indian Malayalam film, directed by Crossbelt Mani and produced by Ponnappan. The film stars Sathyan, Sharada, Adoor Bhasi and Hari in the lead roles. The film had musical score by M. S. Baburaj.

== Plot ==
Radha and Ravi are lovers and neighbours. Radha work in a hospital. Her sister is married to Raghu, a rich businessman. Ravi had a jovial life with his father. Things go smoothly until Radha's brother-in-law Raghu develops a crush on Radha and plans to marry her. He sends her wife Saraswathy and daughter to Saraswathy 's parents' home and proposes to Radha.

== Cast ==
- Sathyan as Ravi
- Sharada as Radha
- Adoor Bhasi as Padmanabha Kurup
- Hari as Gopan
- Sankaradi
- Ambika as Saraswati
- Aranmula Ponnamma as mother
- Kottarakkara Sreedharan Nair as Raghu
- Rajani
- Bahadoor as Purushothaman

== Soundtrack ==
The music was composed by M. S. Baburaj and the lyrics were written by Sreekumaran Thampi.

No.	Song	Singers	Lyrics	Length (m:ss)
1	"Akale Akale Neelakaasham"	K. J. Yesudas, S. Janaki	Sreekumaran Thampi	
2	"Daivamevide"	K. J. Yesudas	Sreekumaran Thampi	
3	"Kanakapratheekshathan"	P. Susheela	Sreekumaran Thampi	
4	"Pineapple Poloru"	K. J. Yesudas	Sreekumaran Thampi	
5	"Ponnum Tharivala"	K. J. Yesudas	Sreekumaran Thampi	
