= Kaadu (1973 Malayalam film) =

- Directed by: P. Subramaniam
- Written by: S. L. Puram Sadanandan
- Screenplay by: S. L. Puram Sadanandan
- Starring: Madhu; Thikkurissy Sukumaran Nair; Shanthi; C. L. Anandan
- Cinematography: U. Rajagopal
- Music by: Vedpal Verma
- Release date: 1 September 1973
- Country: India
- Language: Malayalam

Kaadu is a 1973 Indian Malayalam-language film, directed by P. Subramaniam. The film stars Madhu, Thikkurissy Sukumaran Nair, Shanthi and C. L. Anandan. The film had musical score by Vedpal Verma.

The film was simultaneously made in Tamil as Malai Naattu Mangai, with Gemini Ganesan, in the lead role along with Sasikumar and C. L. Anandan in prominent roles. The film was remade in Hindi as Hum Junglee Hain.

== Cast ==
- Madhu as Rajendran
- Vijayasree as Maala
- P. R. Varalakshmi as Menon's daughter
- Vincent as Veeran
- Thikkurissy Sukumaran Nair as Kaattumooppan
- K. V. Shanthi as Ganga
- C. L. Anandan as Vikraman/Swami
- Kottarakkara Sreedharan Nair as Menon
- Bahadoor as Sekhar
- S. P. Pillai as Sankar

== Soundtrack ==
All lyrics are written by Sreekumaran Thampi; all music is composed by Vedpal Verma.

Track listing
No.	Title	Artist(s)	Length
1.	"Ambili Vidarum Ponmaanam"	K. J. Yesudas, S. Janaki
2.	"En Chundil Raagamandaaram"	P. Susheela
3.	"En Chundil Raaganombaram"	S. Janaki
4.	"Ezhilam Paala Poothu"	K. J. Yesudas, P. Susheela
5.	"Pournamithan"	K. P. Brahmanandan, B. Vasantha, Choir
6.	"Veno Veno"	L. R. Eswari, P. B. Sreenivas
