= Aalmaram =

- Directed by: A. Vincent
- Written by: Bilahari; Thoppil Bhasi (dialogues)
- Screenplay by: Thoppil Bhasi
- Produced by: T. K. Pareekutty
- Starring: Prem Nazir; Madhu; Sheela; Kaviyoor Ponnamma
- Cinematography: A. Venkat
- Edited by: G. Venkittaraman
- Music by: A. T. Ummer
- Production company: Chandrathara Productions
- Distributed by: Chandrathara Productions
- Release date: 26 January 1969
- Country: India
- Language: Malayalam

Aalmaram (transl. Banyan tree) is a 1969 Indian Malayalam-language film directed by A. Vincent and produced by T. K. Pareekutty. The film stars Prem Nazir, Madhu, Sheela and Kaviyoor Ponnamma. It features a musical score by A. T. Ummer.

== Cast ==
- Prem Nazir as Soman
- Madhu as Gopi
- Sheela as Kusumam
- Kaviyoor Ponnamma as Ammini Amma
- Adoor Bhasi
- P. J. Antony as Govinda Kurup
- Sankaradi
- Paul Vengola
- Kottarakkara Sreedharan Nair as Kesava Pillai
- Kuthiravattam Pappu
- Kuttyedathi Vilasini
- Paravoor Bharathan
- K. V. Shanthi

== Soundtrack ==
The music was composed by A. T. Ummer and the lyrics were written by P. Bhaskaran.

No.	Song	Singers	Lyrics	Length (m:ss)
1	"Ellaam Vyartham"	P. Jayachandran	P. Bhaskaran	
2	"Noothana Gaanathin"	K. J. Yesudas, B. Vasantha, Chorus	P. Bhaskaran	
3	"Paraaga Surabhila"	S. Janaki	P. Bhaskaran	
4	"Pinneyum Inakkuyil"	S. Janaki, P. Jayachandran	P. Bhaskaran	
5	"Pullani Varambathu"	P. Leela, C. O. Anto	P. Bhaskaran	
