= Lokaneethi =

- Directed by: R. Velappan Nair
- Written by: Muthukulam Raghavan Pilla
- Screenplay by: Muthukulam Raghavan Pilla
- Produced by: Swami Narayanan
- Starring: Sathyan, B. S. Saroja
- Cinematography: P. Balasubramaniam
- Edited by: K. D. George
- Music by: V. Dakshinamoorthy
- Production company: Kailas Pictures
- Distributed by: Cine Films
- Release date: 24 December 1952
- Country: India
- Language: Malayalam

Lokaneethi (transl. Worldly Justice) is a 1952 Indian Malayalam-language film, directed by R. Velappan Nair and produced by Swami Narayanan. The film stars Sathyan and B. S. Saroja. The film had musical score by V. Dakshinamoorthy.

== Cast ==
- Sathyan
- Pankajavalli
- S. P. Pillai
- B. S. Saroja
- Aranmula Ponnamma
- K. K. Subramaniam
- Kumari Rajam
- Kottarakkara Sreedharan Nair
- Nanukkuttan
- Rajasekharan
- Muthukulam Raghavan Pilla
- Kalaikkal Kumaran
- Kumari Thankam
- P. O. Pappankutty Ashan
- Soman
- Jagathy N. K. Achari
- Kanisukumaran
- Madhuri (old)
- Sivarama Pillai
- T. S. Muthaiah
- Mohan (Old)
- Prabha Kumari
- Sreekumari
- K. Ramabhadran Nair
