= Jwala (1969 film) =

- Directed by: M. Krishnan Nair
- Written by: Kanam E. J. S. L. Puram Sadanandan (dialogues)
- Starring: Prem Nazir; Sheela; Sharada; Adoor Bhasi
- Music by: G. Devarajan
- Production company: Excel Productions
- Distributed by: Excel Productions
- Release date: 26 August 1969
- Country: India
- Language: Malayalam

Jwala (transl. Flame) is a 1969 Indian Malayalam-language film directed by M. Krishnan Nair. The film stars Prem Nazir, Sheela, Sharada and Adoor Bhasi in the lead roles. The film has musical score by G. Devarajan.

== Cast ==
- Prem Nazir as Ravi
- Sheela as Rajamma
- Sharada as Kunjomana, Kunjammini (double role)
- Adoor Bhasi as Menon
- Manavalan Joseph as Police constable
- Adoor Pankajam as Panki
- Aranmula Ponnamma as Swaraswathi
- Kaduvakulam Antony as Police constable
- Kottarakkara Sreedharan Nair as Kunjomana's father
- N. Govindankutty as Govinda Pilla
- Pankajavalli as Meenakshi
- S. P. Pillai as Pankan

== Soundtrack ==
All lyrics are written by Vayalar Ramavarma; all music is composed by G. Devarajan.

No.	Title	Artist(s)	Length
1.	"Jwaala Njanoru"	P. Susheela
2.	"Kudamullappoovinum"	K. J. Yesudas, B. Vasantha
3.	"Thaarakapoovana"	K. J. Yesudas, P. Susheela
4.	"Vadhoovaranmaare"	P. Susheela
5.	"Vadhoovaranmaare" (Pathos)	B. Vasantha
