= Vezhambal =

- Directed by: Stanley Jose
- Written by: S. Kanakam
- Screenplay by: S. Kanakam
- Produced by: S. Gopinathan
- Starring: Vincent; M. G. Soman; Sridevi; Ratheesh
- Cinematography: E. N. C. Nair
- Music by: M. K. Arjunan
- Production company: Swayamprabha Movie Makers
- Distributed by: Swayamprabha Movie Makers
- Release date: 7 October 1977
- Country: India
- Language: Malayalam

Vezhambal is a 1977 Indian Malayalam film, directed by Stanley Jose. The film stars Vincent, M. G. Soman, Sridevi and Ratheesh in the lead roles. The film has musical score by M. K. Arjunan.

== Cast ==
- Vincent
- M. G. Soman
- Ratheesh
- Sridevi
- Jagathy Sreekumar
- Kaviyoor Ponnamma
- Jose Prakash
- Manavalan Joseph
- Sankaradi
- Aroor Sathyan
- Baby Sheela
- Baby Supriya
- Bahadoor
- Kottarakkara Sreedharan Nair
- Mallika Sukumaran
- Master Raghu
- Meena
- P. K. Abraham
- Pankajavalli
- Paravoor Bharathan
- Reena

== Soundtrack ==
The music was composed by M. K. Arjunan.

No.	Song	Singers	Lyrics	Length (m:ss)
1	"Chandrakumarikku"	K. P. Brahmanandan, Pattanakkad Purushothaman	Vayalar	
2	"Muthukal Kortha"	K. J. Yesudas	O. N. V. Kurup	
3	"Naale Neeyoru Thaaram"	Pattanakkad Purushothaman	O. N. V. Kurup	
4	"Raghupathiraghava"	P. Susheela	Vayalar	
5	"Sree Mahaalakshmi"	P. Leela	Vayalar	
6	"Thiruvaakacharthinu"	Jency	Vayalar	
