= Kurukshethram (1970 film) =

- Directed by: P. Bhaskaran
- Written by: Uroob
- Produced by: B. S. Ranga
- Starring: Sathyan; Sheela; Adoor Bhasi; P. J. Antony
- Music by: K. Raghavan
- Production company: Basanth Pictures
- Distributed by: Basanth Pictures
- Release date: 6 March 1970
- Country: India
- Language: Malayalam

Kurukshethram is a 1970 Indian Malayalam film, directed by P. Bhaskaran and produced by B. S. Ranga. The film stars Sathyan, Sheela, Adoor Bhasi and P. J. Antony in the lead roles. The film had musical score by K. Raghavan.

== Cast ==
- Sathyan as Balakrishnan
- Sheela as Sethulakshmi
- Adoor Bhasi
- P. J. Antony
- B. K. Pottekkad
- Adoor Bhavani
- Aranmula Ponnamma
- Kottarakkara Sreedharan Nair
- Paravoor Bharathan

== Soundtrack ==
The music was composed by K. Raghavan and the lyrics were written by P. Bhaskaran.

No.	Song	Singers	Lyrics	Length (m:ss)
1	"Cherupeelikalilakunnoru"	P. Leela	P. Bhaskaran	
2	"Kaalam Mudikkettil"	S. Janaki	P. Bhaskaran	
3	"Kaarmukil Pennu"	S. Janaki	P. Bhaskaran	
4	"Poornendumukhi"	P. Jayachandran	P. Bhaskaran	
5	"Thiruvegappurayulla"	S. Janaki	P. Bhaskaran	
