= Kaattumallika =

- Directed by: P. Subramaniam
- Written by: Kanam E. J.
- Screenplay by: Kanam E. J.
- Produced by: P. Subramaniam
- Starring: Vaikkam Mani; Kalpana; Babu Joseph; C. L. Anandan
- Cinematography: E. N. C. Nair
- Edited by: N. Gopalakrishnan
- Music by: M. S. Baburaj
- Production company: Neela
- Release date: 9 July 1966
- Country: India
- Language: Malayalam

Kaattumallika is a 1966 Indian Malayalam-language film, directed and produced by P. Subramaniam. The film stars Vaikkam Mani, Kalpana, Babu Joseph and C. L. Anandan. The film had musical score by M. S. Baburaj. Kattumallika is essentially a remake of the 1941 Tamil film Vana Mohini.

== Cast ==
- Vaikkam Mani
- Kalpana
- Babu Joseph
- C. L. Anandan
- Geethanjali
- Natarajan
- Paravoor Bharathan
- Rajamma
- S. P. Pillai
- K. V. Shanthi

== Soundtrack ==
The music was composed by M. S. Baburaj and the lyrics were written by Sreekumaran Thampi. This was Thampi's first film.

No.	Song	Singers	Lyrics	Length
1	"Avalude Kannukal"	P. B. Sreenivas	Sreekumaran Thampi	
2	"Kalyaanamaakaatha"	S. Janaki, P. Leela	Sreekumaran Thampi	
3	"Kannuneerkkaattile"	S. Janaki, P. Leela	Sreekumaran Thampi	
4	"Maanathe Poomarakkaattil"	L. R. Eeswari	Sreekumaran Thampi	
5	"Maranathin Nizhalil"	Kamukara	Sreekumaran Thampi	
6	"Pandathe Paattukal"	P. Leela, Kamukara	Sreekumaran Thampi	
7	"Penne Nin Kannile"	Kamukara, B. Vasantha	Sreekumaran Thampi	
8	"Rande Randunaalu"	L. R. Eeswari, P. B. Sreenivas	Sreekumaran Thampi	
9	"Thaamarathoniyil"	K. J. Yesudas, S. Janaki	Sreekumaran Thampi	
10	"Thimthimithaaro"	P. Leela, Chorus	Sreekumaran Thampi	
