= K. V. Shanthi =

Indian actress (1937–2020)

- Born: 25 June 1937; Kottayam, Kerala, India
- Died: 21 September 2020 (aged 83)
- Occupation: Actress
- Years active: 1953–1975
- Spouse(s): G.Sasikumar, Trivandrum.

K. V. Shanthi (25 June 1937 – 21 September 2020) known by her stage name Shanthi was an Indian actress who worked in Malayalam, Telugu, Hindi and Tamil movies. She was a prominent lead actress and dancer in Indian Cinema during the late 1950s, 1960s and 1970s. She appeared in famous Hindi films like Chori Chori of 1956.

== Background ==
She was born at Samkranthi, Kottayam, Kerala, and later moved to Chennai. She was married to Sasikumar and they had one son named Shyam Kumar. She was one of the permanent actresses of Merryland Studio's movies. She has acted in more than 50 Malayalam movies and a few movies in Tamil, Kannada, Telugu and Hindi.

== Filmography ==
Malayalam

1. Kaamam Krodham Moham (1975)
2. Akkaldaama (1975)
3. Devi Kanyaakumaari (1974)
4. Youvanam (1974) as Lakshmi
5. Chanchala (1974)
6. Nellu (1974)
7. Kaadu (1973) as Ganga
8. Professor (1972) as Vasumathi
9. Prathikaram (1972) as Vimala
10. C.I.D. In Jungle (1971)
11. Aana Valarthiya Vaanampaadiyude Makan (1971)
12. Kochaniyathi (1971) as Karthi
13. Aval Alpam Vaikippoyi (1971)
14. Madhuvidhu (1970) as Lakshmi
15. Swapnangal (1970) as Rajamma's mother
16. Aa Chithrashalabham Parannotte (1970)
17. Chattambikkavala (1969) as Thresya
18. Vila Kuranja Manushyan (1969)
19. Nurse (1969)
20. Urangatha Sundary (1969) as Prabhavathi
21. Aalmaram (1969)
22. Adhyaapika (1968)
23. Kadal (1968) as Reetha
24. Viplavakaarikal (1968) as Leela
25. Hotel Highrange (1968) as Madhumathi/Gracy
26. Lady Doctor (1967) as Marykutty
27. Madatharuvi (1967)
28. Karutha Rathrikal (1967)
29. Postman (1967)
30. Jeevikkaan Anuvadikku (1967)
31. Puthri (1966) as Jessy
32. Kallipennu (1966)
33. Kaattumallika (1966)
34. Kaliyodam (1965)
35. Mayavi (1965) as Malathi/Jayanthi
36. Pattuthoovala (1965) as Ameena
37. Althaara (1964)
38. Atom Bomb (1964) as Kamala
39. Karutha Kai (1964) as Radha
40. Snapaka Yohannan (1963) as Esther
41. Doctor (1963) as Seetha
42. Kalayum Kaaminiyum (1963)
43. Kaattumaina (1963)
44. Snehadeepam (1962) as Prabha
45. Sreekovil (1962)
46. Shree Rama Pattabhishekam (1962)
47. Arappavan (1961) as Ammini
48. Bhakta Kuchela (1961) as Sathyabhama
49. Poothali (1960)
50. Aana Valarthiya Vaanampaadi (1959)
51. Mariakutty (1958) as Ruby
52. Lilly (1958)
53. Padatha Painkili (1957) as Lusie
54. Minnunnathellam Ponnalla (1957) as Leela
55. Achanum Makanum (1957) as Srikala
56. Jailppulli (1957) as Prema
57. Ponkathir (1953) as a dancer

Other Languages

Chori Chori (1956) – Hindi

Rajkumar (1964 film) (1964) – Hindi

Penn Kulathin Pon Vilakku (1959) - Tamil

Marutha Nattu Veeran (1961) – Tamil

Ellam Unakkaga (1961) – Tamil

Aadi Perukku (film) (1962) – Tamil

B. Vittalacharya's Telugu movies
