= Jeevikkan Anuvadikku =

- Directed by: P. A. Thomas
- Written by: N. Prakash; Jagathy N. K. Achari (dialogues)
- Screenplay by: Jagathy N. K. Achari
- Produced by: N. Prakash
- Starring: Prem Nazir; Adoor Bhasi; Manavalan Joseph; Pattom Sadan
- Cinematography: N. Prakash
- Edited by: B. S. Mani
- Music by: Vijayabhaskar
- Production company: Movie Crafts
- Distributed by: Movie Crafts
- Release date: 24 February 1967
- Country: India
- Language: Malayalam

Jeevikkan Anuvadikku (transl. Let me Live) is a 1967 Indian Malayalam film, directed by P. A. Thomas and produced by N. Prakash. The film stars Prem Nazir, Adoor Bhasi, Manavalan Joseph and Pattom Sadan in the lead roles. The film had musical score by Vijayabhaskar.

== Cast ==
- Prem Nazir
- Adoor Bhasi
- Manavalan Joseph
- Pattom Sadan
- T. R. Omana
- T. S. Muthaiah
- Kottarakkara Sreedharan Nair
- Meena
- K. S. Parvathy
- K. V. Shanthi
- T. K. Balachandran
- Ushakumari
- Vidhubala

== Soundtrack ==
The music was composed by Vijayabhaskar and the lyrics were written by P. Bhaskaran.

No.	Song	Singers	Lyrics	Length (m:ss)
1	"Arappiriyilakiyathaarkkaanu"	K. J. Yesudas, Pattom Sadan	P. Bhaskaran	
2	"Nilaavinte Neelappoykayil"	K. J. Yesudas, L. R. Eeswari	P. Bhaskaran	
3	"Njanjivide Elpikkunnu"	S. Janaki, P. B. Sreenivas	P. Bhaskaran	
4	"Pirannappol Swayam"	K. J. Yesudas	P. Bhaskaran	
5	"Sugandhamozhukum"	B. Vasantha	P. Bhaskaran	
