= Aana Valarthiya Vanampadiyude Makan =

- Poster
- Directed by: P. Subramaniam
- Written by: Neela; Nagavally R. S. Kurup (dialogues)
- Screenplay by: Nagavally R. S. Kurup
- Produced by: P. Subramaniam
- Starring: Gemini Ganesan; C. L. Anandan; Rajasree; K. V. Shanthi; Vijayanirmala
- Cinematography: Masthan
- Edited by: N. Gopalakrishnan
- Music by: K. V. Mahadevan
- Production company: Neela
- Distributed by: Neela
- Release date: 22 July 1971
- Country: India
- Language: Malayalam

Aana Valarthiya Vanampadiyude Makan is a 1971 Indian Malayalam-language film, directed and produced by P. Subramaniam. The film stars Gemini Ganesan, Rajasree, C. L. Anandan, K. V. Shanthi and Vijayanirmala. It is a sequel to Subramaniam's 1959 film Aana Valarthiya Vanampadi. The film had musical score by K. V. Mahadevan. The film is said to be the first sequel for a Malayalam film. It was dubbed in Tamil as Yaanai Valartha Vaanampadi Magan.

== Cast ==
- Gemini Ganesan
- C. L. Anandan
- Rajasree
- K. V. Shanthi
- Vijayanirmala
- Vijayasree
- Sridevi
- Manorama
- S. D. Subbalakshmi
- T. K. Balachandran

== Soundtrack ==
The music was composed by K. V. Mahadevan and the lyrics were written by O. N. V. Kurup.

Song	Singers
"Engengo Ullaasayaathra"	S. Janaki
"Heyya Villedu Vaaledu"	L. R. Eeswari
"Jaam Jaam Jamennu"	K. J. Yesudas, P. Leela
"Kankonil Kanavinte"	K. J. Yesudas, S. Janaki
"Raajaavinte Thirumakanu"	P. Leela, P. Madhuri
"Virunninu Vili Kelkkanda"	S. Janaki, L. R. Eeswari
