= Sree Guruvayoorappan (1972 film) =

- Directed by: P. Subramaniam
- Written by: Mythology; Nagavally R. S. Kurup (dialogues)
- Screenplay by: Nagavally R. S. Kurup
- Produced by: P. Subramaniam
- Starring: Gemini Ganesan, Sharada Kaviyoor Ponnamma Thikkurissy Sukumaran Nair Rajasree Jose Prakash
- Cinematography: U. Rajagopal
- Edited by: N. Gopalakrishnan
- Music by: V. Dakshinamoorthy
- Production company: Neela
- Distributed by: Neela
- Release date: 23 August 1972
- Country: India
- Language: Malayalam

Sree Guruvayoorappan is a 1972 Indian Malayalam-language devotional and mythological drama film, directed and produced by P. Subramaniam. The film stars Gemini Ganesan, Sharada, Kaviyoor Ponnamma, Thikkurissy Sukumaran Nair and Jose Prakash. The film had musical score by V. Dakshinamoorthy. The plot includes the origin story of Guruvayoor Temple. As soon as Dwarka went beneath the sea, Uddhava reached then shore as instructed by Lord Krishna prior to his demise. He with the help of Vayu got hold of the divine idol worshipped by Lord Krishna and his parents for all three Yugas. With help of Parashurama and Brihaspati the idol was installed in divine land created by Parasurama by his axe. Bhargava Kshetra, modern day Kerala. The miracles of Lord Guruvayoorappan forms the crux of plot.

== Cast ==
- Gemini Ganesan
- Sharada
- Kaviyoor Ponnamma
- Thikkurissy Sukumaran Nair
- Jose Prakash
- Kedamangalam Sadanandan
- karamana Bhasi
- Unnimary
- Adoor Pankajam
- Aranmula Ponnamma
- Baby Kumari
- Baby Sumathi
- Baby Suneetha
- Kanta Rao
- K. S. Gopinath
- Rajasree
- Kottarakkara Sreedharan Nair
- Rani Chandra
- S. P. Pillai
- Somasekharan Nair
- T. K. Balachandran
- Veeran
- Vijayasree

== Soundtrack ==
The music was composed by V. Dakshinamoorthy and the lyrics were written by O. N. V. Kurup, Melpathoor and Poonthanam, or are Traditional.

No.	Song	Singers	Lyrics	Length (m:ss)
1	"Aadiyil Malsyamaay"	K. J. Yesudas	O. N. V. Kurup	
2	"Agre Pashyaami"	K. J. Yesudas	Melpathoor	
3	"Chithrasalabhangalaam Chithirappon"	S. Janaki	O. N. V. Kurup	
4	"Eeshwaran Manushyanaayavatharichu"	K. J. Yesudas	O. N. V. Kurup	
5	"Guruvayoorappante"	Ambili	O. N. V. Kurup	
6	"Indeevaradalanayanaa"	K. J. Yesudas, Chorus	O. N. V. Kurup	
7	"Innaleyolam"	K. J. Yesudas	Poonthanam	
8	"Karayatta Bhakthithan"	K. J. Yesudas	O. N. V. Kurup	
9	"Oru Varam Thedi"	S. Janaki	O. N. V. Kurup	
10	"Peelippoomudi"	P. Leela, Soolamangalam Rajalakshmi	O. N. V. Kurup	
11	"Ponnambala Nada"	P. Susheela	O. N. V. Kurup	
12	"Radhike" (D)	P. Susheela, K. P. Brahmanandan	O. N. V. Kurup	
13	"Radhike" (F)	Ambili, B. Vasantha	O. N. V. Kurup	
14	"Shivathaandavam" (Instrumental)			
15	"Thaapangal Akattuka"	P. Leela	O. N. V. Kurup	
16	"Thankamakudam Choodi"	V. Dakshinamoorthy, K. P. Brahmanandan	O. N. V. Kurup	
17	"Thankamakudam Choodi" (V2)	K. J. Yesudas, K. P. Brahmanandan	O. N. V. Kurup	
18	"Thiravalikkum"	P. Jayachandran	O. N. V. Kurup	
19	"Thirumizhimunayaal"	S. Janaki	O. N. V. Kurup	
20	"Vinnil Thinkaludichappol"	K. J. Yesudas	O. N. V. Kurup	
21	"Yada Yadaahi Dharmasya"	K. J. Yesudas	Traditional	
