= Archana (film) =

- Directed by: K. S. Sethumadhavan
- Written by: C. N. Sreekandan Nair
- Screenplay by: C. N. Sreekandan Nair
- Produced by: T. E. Vasudevan
- Starring: Madhu; Sharada; K. P. Ummer; Adoor Bhasi
- Cinematography: N. S. Mani
- Edited by: T. R. Sreenivasalu
- Music by: K. Raghavan
- Production company: Jaya Maruthi
- Distributed by: Jaya Maruthi
- Release date: 19 March 1966
- Country: India
- Language: Malayalam

Archana is a 1966 Indian Malayalam film, directed by K. S. Sethumadhavan and produced by T. E. Vasudevan. The film stars Madhu, Sharada, K. P. Ummer and Adoor Bhasi. The musical score is by K. Raghavan.

== Cast ==
- Madhu as Rajagopalan
- Sharada as Malathi
- K. P. Ummer as Gopi
- Adoor Bhasi as Bhaskara Menon/Bhasi
- Hari as Rajan's collegemate
- Muthukulam Raghavan Pillai
- Aranmula Ponnamma as Meenakshiyamma/Rajagopalan's Mother
- Kumudam
- Prathapachandran as Rajan's collegemate
- Paul Vengola as Kainottakaran

== Soundtrack ==
All lyrics are written by Vayalar Ramavarma; all music is composed by K. Raghavan.

No.	Title	Artist(s)	Length
1.	"Allenkilumee College Pennungal"	Uthaman, Chorus
2.	"Ammakku Njanoru" (Pathos)	Renuka
3.	"Ammakku Njanoru"	Renuka
4.	"Dhanumaasa Pushpathe"	P. Leela
5.	"Ethra Kandaalum"	L. R. Eeswari
6.	"Kollaamedi Kollaamedi Penne"	P. Leela, Chorus
7.	"Omanappaattumaay"	L. R. Eeswari
