= Swargaputhri =

- Directed by: P. Subramaniam
- Written by: Kanam E. J.
- Screenplay by: Kanam E. J.
- Produced by: P. Subramaniam
- Starring: Madhu; Vijayasree; Thikkurissy Sukumaran Nair; Muthukulam Raghavan Pillai; Kottarakkara Sreedharan Nair
- Cinematography: R. C. Purushothaman
- Edited by: N. Gopalakrishnan
- Music by: G. Devarajan
- Production company: Neela
- Distributed by: Neela
- Release date: 7 December 1973
- Country: India
- Language: Malayalam

Swargaputhri is a 1973 Indian Malayalam-language film, directed and produced by P. Subramaniam. The film stars Madhu, Vijayasree, Thikkurissy Sukumaran Nair and Muthukulam Raghavan Pillai. The film had musical score by G. Devarajan.

== Cast ==
- Madhu as Babu
- Vijayasree as Lissy
- Thikkurissy Sukumaran Nair as Mathai
- Muthukulam Raghavan Pillai as Poulose
- Nilambur Balan as Pappachan
- Raghavan as Doctor
- Adoor Pankajam as Mariyakutty
- Bahadoor as Kunjali
- KPAC Sunny as Thampi
- Kottarakkara Sreedharan Nair as Thomas
- S. P. Pillai as Hospital Warden
- Sujatha as Thampi's Wife

== Soundtrack ==
The music was composed by G. Devarajan and the lyrics were written by Sreekumaran Thampi.

No.	Song	Singers	Lyrics	Length (m:ss)
1	"Aakaashathaamara"	K. J. Yesudas, P. Madhuri	Sreekumaran Thampi	
2	"Daivaputhra Nin"	P. Madhuri	Sreekumaran Thampi	
3	"Kaakke Kaakke"	P. Madhuri	Sreekumaran Thampi	
4	"Kaakke Kaakke" (Pathos)	P. Madhuri	Sreekumaran Thampi	
5	"Maninaadam Maninaadam"	K. J. Yesudas, [P. Madhuri	Sreekumaran Thampi	
6	"Swargaputhree" (Swapnam Vilambiya)	P. Jayachandran	Sreekumaran Thampi	
7	"Swarnamukhi Nin"	P. Jayachandran	Sreekumaran Thampi	
