= Vidyarthi =

Vidyarthi is a surname. Notable people with the surname include:

- Ashish Vidyarthi (born 1962), Indian actor
- Ganesh Shankar Vidyarthi (1890–1931), Indian journalist and activist
- L. P. Vidyarthi (1931–1985), Indian anthropologist
- Prabhudayal Vidyarthi (1922-1977), Indian politician

== See also ==
- Akhil Bharatiya Vidyarthi Parishad, an Indian student organization
