= Professor (1972 film) =

- Poster
- Directed by: P. Subramaniam
- Written by: Thoppil Bhasi
- Screenplay by: Thoppil Bhasi
- Produced by: P Subramaniam
- Starring: Sharada; Gemini Ganesan; Thikkurissy Sukumaran Nair; Baby Rajashree
- Cinematography: E. N. C. Nair
- Edited by: N. Gopalakrishnan
- Music by: G. Devarajan
- Production company: Neela
- Distributed by: Neela
- Release date: 1 April 1972
- Country: India
- Language: Malayalam

Professor is a 1972 Indian Malayalam-language film, directed and produced by P. Subramaniam. The film stars Sharada, Gemini Ganesan, Thikkurissy Sukumaran Nair and Baby Rajashree. The film had musical score by G. Devarajan.

== Cast ==
- Gemini Ganesan as Professor Mangalassery
- Sharada as Lakshmi
- Vijayasree as Mayadevi
- Thikkurissy Sukumaran Nair as Principal
- Alummoodan as Raju Malathinkal
- Baby Rajashree as Latha
- Baby Sumathi as Rema
- Bahadoor as Carnival Magician
- Kottarakkara Sreedharan Nair as Vasumathi's Father
- K. V. Shanthi as Vasumathi
- Kundara Bhasi
- T. K. Balachandran as Film Producer
- K. P. A. C. Sunny as Hostel Warden

== Soundtrack ==
The music was composed by G. Devarajan and the lyrics were written by Vayalar Ramavarma.

No.	Song	Singers	Lyrics	Length (m:ss)
1	"Aaraadhanaavigrahame"	K. J. Yesudas	Vayalar Ramavarma	
2	"Kanyaakumaarikkadappurathu"	P. Leela, Chorus	Vayalar Ramavarma	
3	"Kanyaakumaarikkadappurathu" (Pathos, Bit)	P. Leela	Vayalar Ramavarma	
4	"Kshethrapaalaka Kshamikkoo"	P. Madhuri	Vayalar Ramavarma	
5	"Preethiyayo Priyamulla"	P. Madhuri	Vayalar Ramavarma	
6	"Swayamvaram"	P. Madhuri	Vayalar Ramavarma	
