= Snapaka Yohannan =

- Directed by: P. Subramaniam
- Written by: Muttathu Varkey (dialogues)
- Screenplay by: Muttathu Varkey
- Produced by: P. Subramaniam
- Starring: Jose Prakash; Prem Nazir; Thikkurissy Sukumaran Nair; Adoor Pankajam
- Cinematography: N. S. Mani
- Edited by: N. Gopalakrishnan
- Music by: Br. Lakshmanan
- Production company: Neela
- Distributed by: Neela
- Release date: 31 March 1963
- Country: India
- Language: Malayalam

Snapaka Yohannan (transl. John the Baptist) is a 1963 Indian Malayalam-language biblical epic film about John the Baptist, directed and produced by P. Subramaniam. The film stars Jose Prakash, Prem Nazir, Thikkurissy Sukumaran Nair, Miss Kumari, S. P. Pillai, K. V. Shanthi, L. Vijayalakshmi and Adoor Pankajam. The film had musical score by Br. Lakshmanan. The movie chronicles the life of John the Baptist alongside key events from the New Testament.

== Cast ==
- Jose Prakash as Snaapaka Yohannaan
- Prem Nazir as Julius
- Thikkurissy Sukumaran Nair as Herodias Anthippas
- Adoor Pankajam as Cook
- G. K. Pillai as Pilate
- Kanchana
- Kottarakkara Sreedharan Nair as Naman
- Miss Kumari as Miriam
- Murali as Barabbas
- S. P. Pillai as Samuel
- K. V. Shanthi
- L. Vijayalakshmi as Salome

== Soundtrack ==
The music was composed by Br. Lakshmanan and the lyrics were written by Thirunayinaarkurichi Madhavan Nair and Vayalar Ramavarma.

No.	Song	Singers	Lyrics	Length (m:ss)
1	"Aakashathin Mahimaave"	P. Leela	Thirunayinaarkurichi Madhavan Nair	
2	"Bethlaheminte" (Thiri Koluthuvin)	K. J. Yesudas, P. Leela	Vayalar Ramavarma	
3	"Galilea Kadalilu"	K. J. Yesudas, A. P. Komala, Chorus	Thirunayinaarkurichi Madhavan Nair	
4	"Neeradaam"	P. Susheela, Chorus, Renuka	Thirunayinaarkurichi Madhavan Nair	
5	"Oshaana Daveedin"	Kamukara, A. P. Komala, Chorus	Thirunayinaarkurichi Madhavan Nair	
6	"Pranayam"	S. Janaki	Thirunayinaarkurichi Madhavan Nair	
7	"Shaaronil Viriyum"	P. Susheela, Kamukara	Thirunayinaarkurichi Madhavan Nair	
8	"Thaaraakumaarikale"	S. Janaki	Vayalar Ramavarma	
9	"Thannepol Thannayalkkaarane" (Kaalvari)	P. B. Sreenivas	Thirunayinaarkurichi Madhavan Nair	
10	"Yoodaya Varu"	P. Susheela	Thirunayinaarkurichi Madhavan Nair	
