= Vandikkari =

- Directed by: P. Subramaniam
- Written by: Ponkunnam Varkey
- Screenplay by: Ponkunnam Varkey
- Produced by: P Subramaniam
- Starring: Thikkurissy Sukumaran Nair; Muthukulam Raghavan Pillai; Adoor Pankajam; S. P. Pillai
- Cinematography: E. N. C. Nair
- Edited by: N. Gopalakrishnan
- Music by: G. Devarajan
- Production company: Neela
- Distributed by: Neela
- Release date: 11 April 1974
- Country: India
- Language: Malayalam

Vandikkari is a 1974 Indian Malayalam-language film, directed and produced by P. Subramaniam. The film stars Thikkurissy Sukumaran Nair, Muthukulam Raghavan Pillai, Adoor Pankajam and S. P. Pillai. The film has musical score by G. Devarajan.

== Cast ==
- Thikkurissy Sukumaran Nair
- Muthukulam Raghavan Pillai
- Adoor Pankajam
- S. P. Pillai
- Vijayasree

== Soundtrack ==
The music was composed by G. Devarajan and the lyrics were written by Sreekumaran Thampi.

No.	Song	Singers	Lyrics	Length (m:ss)
1	"Idavappaathikkoluvarunnu"	P. Madhuri	Sreekumaran Thampi	
