= Hridayam Oru Kshethram =

- Directed by: P. Subramaniam
- Screenplay by: Nagavally R. S. Kurup
- Story by: C. V. Sridhar
- Based on: Nenjil Or Aalayam (1962)
- Produced by: P. Subramaniam
- Starring: Madhu; Srividya; Raghavan; KPAC Lalitha
- Cinematography: N. A. Thara
- Edited by: N. Gopalakrishnan
- Music by: G. Devarajan
- Production company: Neela
- Release date: 24 December 1976
- Country: India
- Language: Malayalam

Hridayam Oru Kshethram (transl. The heart is a temple) is a 1976 Indian Malayalam-language film, directed and produced by P. Subramaniam. The film stars Madhu, Srividya, Raghavan and KPAC Lalitha. It is a remake of the Tamil film Nenjil Or Aalayam. The film was released on 24 December 1976.

== Cast ==
- Madhu as Dr. Ramesh
- Srividya as Prema
- Raghavan as Hari
- KPAC Lalitha as Kamalakshi
- Kedamangalam Sadanandan as Priest
- Anandavally as Kalyanimma
- Aranmula Ponnamma as Ramesh's mother
- Baby Sumathi as Sumam
- Bahadoor as Bada Balan Pilla
- KPAC Sunny as Dr. Sunny
- Kuthiravattam Pappu as Naanu
- Treesa
- KPAC Beatrice as Vanaja

== Soundtrack ==
The music was composed by G. Devarajan, with lyrics by Sreekumaran Thampi.

Track listing
No.	Title	Singer(s)	Length
1.	"Enthinenne Vilichu Veendumee"	P. Madhuri
2.	"Kannupothi"	K. J. Yesudas
3.	"Manassil Theenaalam"	P. Madhuri
4.	"Mangalam Nerunnu"	K. J. Yesudas
5.	"Oru Devan Vaazhum"	K. J. Yesudas
6.	"Punchiriyo" (Happy)	P. Madhuri
7.	"Punchiriyo" (Sad)	P. Madhuri
