= Swapnangal =

- Directed by: P. Subramaniam
- Written by: S. L. Puram Sadanandan
- Screenplay by: S. L. Puram Sadanandan
- Produced by: P. Subramaniam
- Starring: Geethanjali; Madhu; K. V. Shanthi; S. P. Pillai
- Cinematography: E. N. C. Nair
- Edited by: N. Gopalakrishnan
- Music by: G. Devarajan
- Production company: Neela
- Distributed by: Neela
- Release date: 2 October 1970
- Country: India
- Language: Malayalam

Swapnangal is a 1970 Indian Malayalam film, directed and produced by P. Subramaniam. The film stars Geethanjali, Madhu, K. V. Shanthi and S. P. Pillai in the lead roles. The film had musical score by G. Devarajan.

== Cast ==
- Geethanjali as Rajamma
- Madhu as Dr. Balakrishnan
- K. V. Shanthi as Rajamma's mother
- S. P. Pillai as Chellappan
- Kanakasree as Kamalamma
- DK Chellappan as Gopala Pilla
- Sridevi as young Rajamma
- Srividya as Radha
- Vincent as Chandran
- Philip as Soman Nair
- Ramachandran
- Mani
- Radhakrishnan

== Soundtrack ==
The music was composed by G. Devarajan and the lyrics were written by Vayalar Ramavarma.

No.	Song	Singers	Lyrics	Length (m:ss)
1	"Akkuthikkuthaana Varambel"	Renuka	Vayalar Ramavarma	
2	"Kalimankudililirunnu"	P. Susheela	Vayalar Ramavarma	
3	"Madiraakshi Nin"	K. J. Yesudas, P. Madhuri	Vayalar Ramavarma	
4	"Pichalappaalkudam"	K. J. Yesudas	Vayalar Ramavarma	
5	"Pooja Pooja"	P. Susheela	Vayalar Ramavarma	
6	"Thirumayilppeeli"	P. Leela, Latha Raju	Vayalar Ramavarma	
7	"Thirumayilppeeli" (Pathos)	P. Leela, Renuka	Vayalar Ramavarma	
8	"Urangiyaalum Swapnangal"	P. Madhuri	Vayalar Ramavarma	
