= Mariakutty =

- Poster
- Directed by: P. Subramaniam
- Written by: Muttathu Varkey
- Based on: Mariakutty by Muttathu Varkey
- Produced by: P. Subramaniam
- Starring: Prem Nazir; Miss Kumari
- Cinematography: N. S. Mani
- Edited by: K. D. George
- Music by: Br. Lakshmanan
- Production company: Neela Productions
- Release date: 15 March 1958
- Country: India
- Language: Malayalam

Mariakutty is a 1958 Indian Malayalam-language film, directed and written by Muttathu Varkey. The film stars Prem Nazir and Miss Kumari. It is based on Varkey's 1957 novel of the same name, centering around a young village woman named Mariakutty.

== Cast ==
- Prem Nazir as Pappachan
- Miss Kumari as Mariyakutty
- K. V. Shanthi as Ruby
- Thikkurissy Sukumaran Nair as Variyalle Kuruvachan
- Bahadoor as Kasim
- Jose Prakash as Ponnappachan
- S. P. Pillai as Naanu
- T. S. Muthaiah as Thoma
- Changanasseri Chinnamma as Chacko's mother
- Abraham Joseph as Kucheri
- Aranmula Ponnamma as Achamma
- Baby Indira as Kuruvachan's youngdaughter
- William Thomas as Chacko
- Kottarakkara Sreedharan Nair as Kora
- T. D. Kusalakumari as Betty
- Nanukkuttan as Pillachan
- Pankajavalli as Annamma
- Thankam as Pathumma
- Kottayam Shantha as Mariakutty's friend

== Soundtrack ==
The music was composed by Br. Lakshmanan. The song "Poonkuyil Paadidumbol" is based on "Bade Armaan Se Rakha Hai", composed by Roshan for Malhar (1951). "Karalil Kaniyum Rasamey" is based on "Amudhai Pozhiyum Nilave", composed by T. G. Lingappa for Thangamalai Ragasiyam (1957).
