= Kalam Marunnu =

- Directed by: R. Velappan Nair
- Written by: Kailas Pictures
- Screenplay by: R. Velappan Nair
- Produced by: Swami Narayanan
- Starring: Sathyan; K. P. A. C. Sulochana
- Cinematography: P. B. Mani
- Edited by: K. D. George
- Music by: G. Devarajan, Br. Lakshmanan
- Distributed by: Excel Release
- Release date: 21 April 1955
- Country: India
- Language: Malayalam

Kalam Marunnu (transl. Times Are Changing) is a 1955 Indian Malayalam-language film, directed by R. Velappan Nair and produced by Swami Narayanan. The film stars Sathyan and K. P. A. C. Sulochana. The film had musical score by G. Devarajan and Br. Lakshmanan.

== Cast ==
- Sathyan
- K. P. A. C. Sulochana
- Thikkurissy Sukumaran Nair
- Chandni (Old)
- Kambisseri Karunakaran
- O. Madhavan
- T. S. Muthaiah
- Pankajavalli
