= Preethi =

- Directed by: William Thomas
- Written by: Hamrabi; N. Govindankutty (dialogues)
- Screenplay by: N. Govindankutty
- Starring: Madhu; Sheela; Prem Navas; Baby Shabnam
- Cinematography: U. Rajagopal
- Edited by: V. P. Krishnan
- Music by: A. T. Ummer
- Production company: KK Films Combines
- Distributed by: KK Films Combines
- Release date: 6 April 1972
- Country: India
- Language: Malayalam

Preethi is a 1972 Indian Malayalam-language film, directed by William Thomas. The film stars Madhu, Sheela, Prem Navas and Baby Shabnam. The film's score was composed by A. T. Ummer.

== Cast ==
- Madhu
- Sheela
- Prem Nawas
- Baby Shabnam
- Bahadoor
- Kaduvakulam Antony
- N. Govindankutty
- Philomina
- S. P. Pillai

== Soundtrack ==
The music was composed by A. T. Ummer with lyrics by Pavithran.

| No. | Song | Singers | Lyrics | Length (m:ss) |
|---|---|---|---|---|
| 1 | "Adharam Madhuchashakam" | K. J. Yesudas | Pavithran | |
| 2 | "Kanna Kaarvarnna" (Thoovenna Kandal) | S. Janaki | Pavithran | |
| 3 | "Kannuneeril" | K. J. Yesudas | Pavithran | |
| 4 | "Kizhakku Ponmalayil" | P. Jayachandran | Pavithran | |
| 5 | "Naadha Varoo Prananaadha" | L. R. Eeswari | Pavithran | |
| 6 | "Umma Tharumo" | S. Janaki, K. C. Varghese Kunnamkulam, Latha Raju | Pavithran | |
