= P. Subramaniam =

Indian film director

- Born: 19 February 1905; Nagercoil, Kingdom of Travancore, British India (present day Kanyakumari, Tamil Nadu, India)
- Died: 4 October 1979 (aged 69)
- Occupations: Film director; Producer; Mayor
- Years active: 1956-1979
- Spouse: Meenakshi Ammal
- Children: 6

Padmanabha Subramaniam (19 February 1905 – 4 October 1979) was an Indian film producer, film director, distributor, theatre owner, and mayor. He is the founder of Merryland Studio (established in 1951), the second film studio in Kerala.

From mid-1950s to late 1970s, he produced 69 films of which 59 films were directed by himself. His Kumara Sambhavam won the first ever Kerala State Film Award for Best Film. His 1958 film Randidangazhi received the National Film Award for Best Feature Film in Malayalam. He contributed the proceedings from his 1975 film Swami Ayyappan for the development of Sabarimala shrine in Kerala, where he constructed a road named Swamy Ayyappan Road.

He contributed significantly to the Malayalam cinema, by starting cinema exhibition houses, distribution ventures, a film studio and a production company for making films with both devotional and social themes. His venture Merryland Studio (established in 1951) was the second film production studio of Kerala, after its major competitor Udaya Studio. The films were produced under the banner Neela Productions, named after his mother, Neelammal.

== Early life ==
P. Subramaniam was born to Padmanabha Pillai and Neelammal in Nagercoil, (present-day Kanyakumari District) on 19 February 1910. He joined college in Thiruvananthapuram for his intermediate course. He, however, did not complete the course as he got posted as a clerk in Trivandrum Water Works, the water authority.

At Trivandrum Water Works, the first order of installion of water supply came from Kowdiar Palace of the Travancore royal family. It was during this project that his hard work and honesty made an impression with members of the royal family and the Diwan of Travancore, Sir C. P. Ramaswami Iyer.

One year later, Subramaniam joined the government Stationery Department, where he continued to make an impression with the Diwan.

== Career ==
=== Business ===
His connections with the Diwan and the royal household helped him quit his job and start his first business - a bus service in Thiruvananthapuram, the capital of erstwhile Travancore. Sir C. P. Ramaswami Iyer first helped him buy an eight-seater vehicle. Subramaniam later added two more buses to his fleet.

=== Early productions ===
When the Travancore government decided to start renovation works in and around Thampanoor railway station (Thiruvananthapuram Central station), the Diwan helped Subramaniam get a piece of marshy land near the railway station, on lease. Subramaniam decided to fill the marshy land and start a Theatre. Thus, 'New Theatre' came into being in Thiruvananthapuram. New Theatre is still a prominent cinema theatre in the city. Later on, he started two more theatres - one named Sreekumar and the other named Sree Vishakh. Among them, the former is a part of Malayalam film history as the theatre which witnessed the longest theatrical run of a Malayalam film - The evergreen Malayalam film Godfather, released in 1991, which ran 405 days in Sreekumar Theatre.

Even before this venture, Subramaniam produced Prahlada, a film that is believed to have been actually financed by the royal family. Again, Sir C. P. Ramaswami Iyer provided assistance to Subramaniam in this venture.

=== Merryland Studio ===
Subramaniam later joined director K. Subramaniam as his assistant. It was in 1951 that he started producing films, when he started Merryland Studio in Thiruvananthapuram. Neela Productions, his production company, was named after his mother Neelammal. Named after Lord Subramanya and being a devotee himself, he used his namesake's picture as the studio emblem. His first film was Aathmasakhi, released in 1952. It was the first released film of the legendary actor Sathyan, who later became one of the greatest actors ever in the Malayalam film industry.

Subramaniam soon became a major figure in the film industry, and continued to produce and direct films. Along with his competitor M. Kunchacko, he was one of the pioneering figures of Malayalam film industry in its early days. They produced various types of films. Merryland was usually popular for producing epic films, like Bhakta Kuchela, Sree Rama Pattabhishekam, Snapaka Yohannan, Kumara Sambhavam, Sree Guruvayoorappan, Swami Ayyappan, Amba Ambika Ambalika and Sree Murugan. They also used socially relevant stories.

Subramaniam's films were also popular for their songs. Thirunainar Kurichi Madhavan Nair and Br Lakshmanan were the duo which created the songs during their early days. Subramaniam was also instrumental in developing the career of the popular singer Kamukara Purushothaman. In almost all Merryland films until 1970, the trio was used to add music. The songs like 'Athmavidyalayame', 'Eeswara Chinthayithonne', 'Naale Naale Ennayittu', etc. are very popular songs from this team. Later on, he also used lyricists like P. Bhaskaran, Vayalar Ramavarma, O. N. V. Kurup, Sreekumaran Thampi, etc. and musicians like G. Devarajan, M. S. Baburaj, V. Dakshinamoorthy and M. B. Sreenivasan.

Subramaniam continued to produce films until he died on 4 October 1979, at the age of 69. Now his company is run by his children. Merryland later was popular for remaking their old film Swami Ayyappan in TV serial format.

== Personal life ==
Subramaniam was married to Meenakshi Ammal. Their marriage happened when both of them were less than 20 years old, according to the prevalent customs. The couple had six children - S. Kumar, S. Padmanabhan, M. Leela, M. S. Sivakumar, S. Karthikeyan and S. Murugan. The eldest son, S. Kumar, later became a noted film producer on his own right, and founded a new company named 'Sastha Productions' after his father's death. The fourth and youngest sons, Karthikeyan and Murugan, revamped Merryland Studios in mid 2000's.

Subramaniam was a deeply religious Hindu throughout his life, and was a devotee of his namesake Lord Murugan. Despite being relocated to Thiruvananthapuram long back, he used to visit Velimalai Kumaraswamy Temple in Thuckalay whenever possible. It was due to his devotion to Lord Murugan that he chose the form of Lord Murugan standing with peacock over Earth as the logo of Merryland Studios, and four of his five sons - with the exception of Padmanabhan-were named after Lord Murugan.

== Filmography ==
=== Films ===
- Hridhayathinte Nirangal (1979)
- Rowdy Rajamma (1977)
- Sree Murugan (1977)
- Vidarunna Mottugal (1977)
- Amba Ambika Ambalika (1976)
- Hiridhayam Oru Kshethram (1976)
- Swami Ayyappan (1975)
- Devi Kanyakumari (1974)
- Vandikkari (1974)
- Kaadu (1973)
- Malai Naattu Mangai (1973) [Tamil]
- Swarga Puthri (1973)
- Preethi (1972)
- Professor (1972/I)
- Sree Guruvayoorappan (1972)
- Aana Valarthiya Vanampadiyude Makan (1971)
- Kochanijathy (1971)
- Swapnangal (1970)
- Kumara Sambhavam (1969)
- Urangatha Sundary (1969)
- Adhyapika (1968)
- Hotel Highrange (1968)
- Kaattumallika (1966)
- Priyathama (1966)
- Puthri (1966)
- Kaliyodum (1965)
- Pattuthoovaala (1965)
- Althaara (1964)
- Atom Bomb (1964)
- Kalayum Kaminiyum (1963)
- Snapaka Yohannan (1963)
- Shree Rama Pattabhishekam (1962)
- Snehadeepam (1962)
- Bhaktha Kuchela (1961)
- Christmas Rathri (1961)
- Poothali (1960)
- Aana Valarthiyal Vanampady (1959)
- Mariakutty (1958)
- Randidangazhi (1958)
- Jailpully (1957)
- Padatha Painkili (1957)
- Manthravadi (1956)

== Awards ==
National Film Awards

- 1957 - President's Silver Medal for Best Feature Film in Malayalam - Padatha Painkili
- 1958 - Certificate of Merit in Malayalam - Randidangazhi

Kerala State Film Awards

- Kerala State Film Award for Best Film: Kumara Sambhavam - 1969
- Kerala State Film Award for Best Film with Popular Appeal and Aesthetic Value: Swami Ayyappan - 1976
