= Nagavally R. S. Kurup =

Indian writer, commentator and broadcaster

Nagavally R. Sreedhara Kurup
- Born: 1917; Ramankary, Kingdom of Travancore, British India (present day Alappuzha, Kerala, India)
- Died: 27 December 2003 (aged 85–86); Thiruvananthapuram, Kerala, India
- Occupations: Writer; Scriptwriter; Commentator; Broadcaster
- Spouse: Rajamma
- Children: 4 (incl. Venu Nagavally)
- Parents: P. M. Rama Kurup; Kuttiyamma

Nagavally Rama Sreedhara Kurup, popularly known as Nagavally (1917 – 27 December 2003), was an Indian writer, commentator and broadcaster best known for his works with the All India Radio. He was the father of the Malayalam actor and director Venu Nagavally. He authored over 50 literary works including plays and around 20 film scripts. He penned the script for the Malayalam film Newspaper Boy which is regarded as the first neo-realist movie in Malayalam.

He was honoured by the Kerala Sahithya Akademi for his overall contributions to Malayalam literature. The Kerala Sangeetha Nataka Akademi also honoured him with Kerala Sangeetha Nataka Akademi Award in 1993.

== Early life and career ==
Nagavally Rama Sreedhara Kurup was born to Adv P. M. Rama Kurup and Kuttiyamma at Ramankary village in Kuttanad of Alappuzha district in 1917. He had his primary education from Sanatana Dharma Vidyasala High School, Alappuzha, St. Berchmans College and Maharaja's College, Ernakulam. His articles appeared in Malayarajyam weekly, Kollam. After his graduation, he started his career with the Indian Bank but left it to join the SD College, Alappuzha, as a lecturer in the Department of Psychology and worked there for 9 years. In 1951, he joined All India Radio. He was senior producer at the time of his retirement from AIR in 1977.

== Personal life ==
He was married to Rajamma. The couple had four children Venu Nagavally, Ramachandran, Vasundara and Lalithambi.

== Contributions ==
Movies

- Amma (1952) - Scriptwriter
- Newspaper Boy (1955) - Scriptwriter
- Bhakta Kuchela (1961)
- Sreerama Pattabhishekam (1962)
- Kumara Sambhavam (1969) - Screenplay
- Sree Guruvayoorappan (1972) - Screenplay
- Devi Kanyakumari (1974) - Scriptwriter
- Chottanikkara Amma (1976) - Scriptwriter
- Hridayam Oru Kshethram (1976) - Scriptwriter
- Jagadguru Aadisankaran (1977)
- Randu Janmam (1978) - Director
- Bhaktha Hanuman (1980) - Written by
