= Kamukara Purushothaman =

- Born: 4 December 1930; Thiruvattar, Kanyakumari, India
- Died: 25 May 1995 (aged 64)
- Occupations: Playback singer, School teacher
- Years active: 1953-1995

Kamukara Purushothaman (4 December 1930 – 26 May 1995) was a noted Indian playback singer of Malayalam cinema during its early years. He recorded over 170 songs in 68 movies in various South Indian languages.

== Early life ==
Kamukara was born on 4 December 1930 in Thiruvattar in Kanyakumari district of present day Tamil Nadu. He was the son of Parameswara Kurup and Lekshmikkutty Amma. He started learning music from an early age under Karnatic music guru Thiruvattar Arumugham Pillai Bhagavathar, along with his sister, Leela Omchery, a known singer and musicologist. His career debut was at the local temple, Aadi Keshava Temple, Thiruvattar. He started music concerts by the age of 15 and became an artist at Trivandrum Broadcasting Corporation by the age of 20 and became active in All India Radio music programmes.

== Career ==
His first recording for a film was in 1953 for the Malayalam film, Ponkathir, a Merryland Studio production to start a film career which spanned over 20 years and 68 Malayalam (total 125) films. He was the leading male singer in Malayalam films during the 50s and 60s till K.J. Yesudas appeared on the scene. Two of his soulfully rendered songs, "Aathmavidyalayame" for the film Harishchandra and "Ekanthathayude" for Bhargavi Nilayam are widely considered to be among the all-time great songs of Malayalam film music. He was a regular singer in Merryland films until the 1970s. Most of his songs were written by Thirunainar kurichi Madhavan Nair and composed by Brother Lakshmanan.

Later in his career, Kamukara Purushothaman, along with K. P. Udayabhanu and other senior singers formed a music troupe by name Old is Gold and performed stage programs all over India and abroad.

In 1983, he received the Kerala Sangeetha Nataka Akademi Award.

== Death ==
Kamukara, who was a school teacher by profession, and retired as the Principal of Thiruvattar Govt. School, died suddenly on 26 May 1995 after suffering from a massive heart attack while on a journey to Thiruvananthapuram. He was aged 64 at the time of his death. He is survived by his four children, children-in-law and grandchildren. Ramani Purushothaman, his wife, died on 30 January 2025, aged 88.

== Popular songs ==
Song	Film
Aathmavidyalayame	Harishchandra
Eeswara chintha ithonne manushyanu	Bhakta Kuchela
Nale Nale ennayittum Bhagavane	Bhakta Kuchela
Ganga Yamuna	Hotel Highrange
Sangeethame Jeevitham	Jail Pulli
Osana, Osana	Snapaka Yohannan
Mattoru Seethaye	Tharavattamma
Ekanthathyude Apara theeram	Bhargavi Nilayam
Pancha Varna Thatha Pole	Karutha kai
Asoka Vanathile Seethamma	Kallichellamma
Marakkan Kazhiyumo	Kannur Deluxe
Padachavan Padachappol	Kayamkulam Kochunni
Panineer Malarinorithal kozhinjalum	Njana Sundari
Thumpappoo peyyana poonilaave	Randidangazhi
Poovinu manamilla kinavinu kulirilla	Chilamboli
Chandrande prabhayil chandana mazhayil	
Poothaliyundo kinave poopanthalundo nilave	Indulekha
Mindathathenthanu thathe	Njanasundari
Kanninayum kanninayum bandham nischayichu	Lady doctor

== Kamukara Awards ==
Kamukara Award is instituted in the remembrance of Kamukara Purushothaman, to exemplary musicians. It was started in 1997, as a part of Kamukara's second death anniversary. Awardees by the year are:

V. Dakshinamoorthy, K. Raghavan, P. Leela, K. J. Yesudas, P. Jayachandran, P. Susheela, S. Janaki, Vani Jairam, P. B. Sreenivas, M. S. Baburaj, B. Vasantha, L. R. Eswari, K. J. Joy, M. S. Viswanathan, M. K. Arjunan, M. G. Radhakrishnan, Shyam (composer), K. P. Udayabhanu, P. Madhuri, Ouseppachan, Sujatha Mohan, K. S. Chithra and M. G. Sreekumar.
