= Vayalar Ramavarma filmography =

Vayalar Ramavarma (25 March 1928 – 27 October 1975), better identified by the name of his birthplace, Vayalar, was an Indian poet and lyricist of Malayalam language. He was known for his poems as well as for over 1,300 songs he composed for 256 Malayalam films.

Film	Year	Composer	Director
Aa Chithrashalabham Parannotte	1970	G. Devarajan	P. Balthasar
Abhayam	1970	V. Dakshinamoorthy	Ramu Kariat
Achanum Bappayum	1972	G. Devarajan	K. S. Sethumadhavan
Adimakal	1969	G. Devarajan	K. S. Sethumadhavan
Adyathe Kadha	1972	M. K. Arjunan	K. S. Sethumadhavan
Agnimrigam	1971	G. Devarajan	M. Krishnan Nair
Agnipareeksha	1968	G. Devarajan	M. Krishnan Nair
Agniputhri	1967	Baburaj	M. Krishnan Nair
Akkarappacha	1972	G. Devarajan	M. M. Nesan
Alibabayum 41 Kallanmaarum	1975	G. Devarajan	J. Sasikumar
Ammayenna Sthree	1970	A. M. Rajah	K. S. Sethumadhavan
Anaachaadhanam	1968	G. Devarajan	M. Krishnan Nair
Anaarkali	1966	Baburaj	Kunchacko
Anaavaranam	1976	G. Devarajan	A. Vincent
Ankathattu	1974	G. Devarajan	T. R. Raghunath
Anna	1964	G. Devarajan	K. S. Sethumadhavan
Anubhavangal Paalichakal	1971	G. Devarajan	K. S. Sethumadhavan
Anugraham	1977	Shankar–Ganesh	Melattoor Ravi Varma
Arakkillam	1967	G. Devarajan	N. Sankaran Nair
Aranazhika Neram	1970	G. Devarajan	K. S. Sethumadhavan
Archana	1966	K. Raghavan	K. S. Sethumadhavan
Aromalunni	1972	G. Devarajan	Kunchacko
Ashwamedham	1967	G. Devarajan	A. Vincent
Athidhi	1975	G. Devarajan	K. P. Kumaran
Aval	1967	G. Devarajan	P. M. A. Azeez
Aval Oru Thudarkatha	1975	M. S. Viswanathan	K. Balachander
Avalalpam Vaikippoyi	1971	G. Devarajan	John Sankaramangalam
Avar Unarunnoo	1956	V. Dakshinamoorthy	N. Sankaran Nair
Aayisha	1964	R. K. Shekhar	Kunchacko
Azhakulla Saleena	1973	K. J. Yesudas	K. S. Sethumadhavan
Bada Dosth	2006	M. Jayachandran	Viji Thampi
Bhaarya	1962	G. Devarajan	Kunchacko
Bhadradeepam	1973	Baburaj	M. Krishnan Nair
Bheekara Nimishangal	1970	Baburaj	M. Krishnan Nair
Bhoomidevi Pushpiniyaayi	1974	G. Devarajan	Hariharan
Bobanum Moliyum	1971	Joseph Krishna	M. Sasikumar
Brahmachaari	1972	V. Dakshinamoorthy	M. Sasikumar
Chaayam	1973	G. Devarajan	P. N. Menon
Chakravaakam	1974	Shankar–Ganesh	Thoppil Bhasi
Chakravarthini	1977	G. Devarajan	Charles Ayyampally
Chalanam	1975	G. Devarajan	N. R. Pillai
Chandanachola	1975	K. J. Joy	Jeassy
Chathurangam	1959	G. Devarajan	J. D. Thottan
Chattakkari	1974	G. Devarajan, Usha Uthup	K. S. Sethumadhavan
Checkpost	1974	P. S. Divakar	J. D. Thottan
Cheenavala	1975	M. K. Arjunan	Kunchacko
Chembarathi	1972	G. Devarajan	P. N. Menon
Chemmeen	1965	Salil Chowdhury	Ramu Kariat
Chenda	1973	G. Devarajan	A. Vincent
Cheruppakkar Sookshikkuka	1977	V. Dakshinamoorthy	Unknown
Chettathi	1965	Baburaj	Puttanna Kanagal
Chukku	1973	G. Devarajan	K. S. Sethumadhavan
Chuvanna Sandhyakal	1975	G. Devarajan	K. S. Sethumadhavan
Collector Malathi	1967	Baburaj	M. Krishnan Nair
Daaham	1965	G. Devarajan	K. S. Sethumadhavan
Darsanam	1973	G. Devarajan	P. N. Menon
Dathuputhran	1970	G. Devarajan	Kunchacko
Devi	1972	G. Devarajan	K. S. Sethumadhavan
Devi Kanyaakumaari	1974	G. Devarajan	P. Subramaniam
Dharmakshethre Kurushethre	1975	M. S. Viswanathan	Kunchacko
Durga	1974	G. Devarajan	Kunchacko
Dweep	1977	Baburaj	Ramu Kariat
Enikku Nee Mathram	1975	G. Devarajan	Unknown
Enippadikal	1973	G. Devarajan	Thoppil Bhasi
Ente Ponnu Thampuran	1992	G. Devarajan	A. T. Abu
Ezhu Raathrikal	1968	Salil Chowdhury, Santha P. Nair	Ramu Kariat
Gayathri	1973	G. Devarajan	P. N. Menon
Gandharvakshethram	1972	G. Devarajan	A. Vincent
Gangaasangamam	1971	G. Devarajan	J. D. Thottan
Hello Darling	1975	M. K. Arjunan	A. B. Raj
Hotel High Range	1968	G. Devarajan	P. Subramaniam
Ilaneer	1981	Shyam	Sithara Venu
Inapraavukal	1965	V. Dakshinamoorthy	Kunchacko
Iniyoru Janmam Tharoo	1972	M. B. Sreenivasan	K. Vijayan
Inqulab Zindabbad	1971	G. Devarajan	K. S. Sethumadhavan
Interview	1973	V. Dakshinamoorthy	M. Sasikumar
Jail	1966	G. Devarajan	Kunchacko
Jeevikkaan Marannu Poya Sthree	1974	M. S. Viswanathan	K. S. Sethumadhavan
Jesus	1973	M. S. Viswanathan	P. A. Thomas
Jwaala	1969	G. Devarajan	M. Krishnan Nair
Kaapalika	1973	R. K. Shekhar	Crossbelt Mani
Kappiri Thuruthu	2016	Rafeeq Yusuf	Saheer Ali
Kathirunna Nikah	1965	G. Devarajan	M. Krishnan Nair
Kaattuthulasi	1965	Baburaj	M. Krishnan Nair
Kaavaalam Chundan	1967	G. Devarajan	M. Sasikumar
Kavyamela	1965	V. Dakshinamoorthy	M. Krishnan Nair
Kacha Devayani	NA	G. Devarajan	Unknown
Kadalamma	1963	G. Devarajan	Kunchacko
Kadalppaalam	1969	G. Devarajan	K. S. Sethumadhavan
Kadathukaaran	1965	Baburaj	M. Krishnan Nair
Kalanjukittiya Thankam	1964	G. Devarajan	Puttanna Kanagal
Kalithozhi	1971	G. Devarajan, K. Raghavan	D. M. Pottekkad
Kaliyugam	1973	G. Devarajan	K. S. Sethumadhavan
Kalpana	1970	V. Dakshinamoorthy	K. S. Sethumadhavan
Kalyana Photo	1965	K. Raghavan	J. D. Thottan
Kalyanarathriyil	1966	G. Devarajan	M. Krishnan Nair
Kanaatha Veshangal	1967	B. A. Chidambaranath	M. Krishnan Nair
Kanakachilanka	1966	Baburaj	M. Krishnan Nair
Kanmanikal	1966	G. Devarajan	M. Sasikumar
Kannum Karalum	1962	M. B. Sreenivasan	K. S. Sethumadhavan
Kanyakumari	1974	M. B. Sreenivasan	K. S. Sethumadhavan
Karakaanaakkadal	1971	G. Devarajan	K. S. Sethumadhavan
Karinizhal	1971	G. Devarajan	J. D. Thottan
Kasavuthattam	1967	G. Devarajan	Kunchacko
Kenalum Collectorum	1976	G. Devarajan	M. M. Nesan
Kodungallooramma	1968	K. Raghavan	Kunchacko
Koodappirappu	1956	K. Raghavan	J. D. Thottan
Koottukaar	1966	Baburaj	M. Sasikumar
Koottukudumbam	1969	G. Devarajan	K. S. Sethumadhavan
Kottaaram Vilkkaanundu	1975	G. Devarajan	K. Suku
Kottayam Kolakkes	1967	B. A. Chidambaranath	K. S. Sethumadhavan
Kudumbam	1967	R. Sudarsanam	M. Krishnan Nair
Kumara Sambhavam	1969	G. Devarajan	P. Subramaniam
Kuttavaali	1970	V. Dakshinamoorthy	K. S. Sethumadhavan
Kuttichaathan	1975	R. K. Shekhar	Crossbelt Mani
Lahari	1982	G. Devarajan	T. K. Ramachandran
Line Bus	1971	G. Devarajan	K. S. Sethumadhavan
Lora Nee Evide	1971	Baburaj	T. R. Raghunath
Madhavikkutty	1973	G. Devarajan	Thoppil Bhasi
Maanishaada	1975	G. Devarajan	Kunchacko
Maratha Nadu	2004	Raveendran, Robin Thirumala, G. Devarajan	Haridas
Maasappadi Maathupilla	1973	G. Devarajan	A. N. Thampi
Mainatharuvi Kolakkes	1967	V. Dakshinamoorthy	Kunchacko
Makane Ninakku Vendi	1971	G. Devarajan	E. N. Balakrishnan
Makkal	1975	G. Devarajan	K. S. Sethumadhavan
Manavaatti	1964	G. Devarajan	K. S. Sethumadhavan
Manushyaputhran	1973	G. Devarajan	Baby
Maravil Thirivu Sookshikkuka	1972	G. Devarajan	M. Sasikumar
Mayilaadumkunnu	1972	G. Devarajan	S. Babu
Mayor Nair	1966	L. P. R. Varma	Puttanna Kanagal
Mazhakkaaru	1973	G. Devarajan	P. N. Menon
Mister Sundari	1974	Kannur Rajan	S. S. Vasan
Mucheettukalikkaarante Makal	1975	G. Devarajan	Thoppil Bhasi
Naadan Pennu	1967	G. Devarajan	K. S. Sethumadhavan
Nadeenadanmaare Aavasyamundu	1974	R. K. Shekhar	Crossbelt Mani
Nadi	1969	G. Devarajan	A. Vincent
Nakhangal	1973	G. Devarajan	A. Vincent
Navavadhu	1971	G. Devarajan	P. Bhaskaran
Neelakkannukal	1974	G. Devarajan	Madhu
Neelapponmaan	1975	Salil Chowdhury	Kunchacko
Nellu	1974	Salil Chowdhury	Ramu Kariat
Night Duty	1974	V. Dakshinamoorthy	M. Sasikumar
Nilakkatha Chalanangal	1970	G. Devarajan	K. Suku
Ningalenne Communistaakki	1970	G. Devarajan	Thoppil Bhasi
Nithyakanyaka	1963	G. Devarajan	K. S. Sethumadhavan
Nizhalattam	1970	G. Devarajan	A. Vincent
Nurayum Pathayum	1977	G. Devarajan	J. D. Thottan
Odakkuzhal	1975	M. K. Arjunan	P. N. Menon
Odayil Ninnu	1965	G. Devarajan	K. S. Sethumadhavan
Ollathumathi	1967	L. P. R. Varma	K. S. Sethumadhavan
Omana	1972	G. Devarajan	J. D. Thottan
Omanakuttan	1964	G. Devarajan	K. S. Sethumadhavan
Orkkuka Vallappozhum	2009	M. Jayachandran	Sohan Lal
Oru Penninte Kadha	1971	G. Devarajan	K. S. Sethumadhavan
Oru Sundariyude Kadha	1972	G. Devarajan	Thoppil Bhasi
Oru Swakaaryam	1983	M. B. Sreenivasan	Harikumar
Othenante Makan	1970	G. Devarajan	Kunchacko
Paalaattu Koman (Konkiyamma)	1962	Baburaj, G. Ramanathan	Kunchacko
Paapathinu Maranamilla	1979	G. Devarajan	N. Sankaran Nair
Paavangal Pennungal	1973	G. Devarajan	Kunchacko
Padicha Kallan	1969	G. Devarajan	M. Krishnan Nair
Panchavankaadu	1971	G. Devarajan	Kunchacko
Panimudakku	1972	Baburaj	P. N. Menon
Panineer Mazha	1976	M. K. Arjunan	B. K. Pottekkad
Panitheeratha Veedu	1973	M. S. Viswanathan	K. S. Sethumadhavan
Pattuthoovala	1965	G. Devarajan	P. Subramaniam
Pazhassi Raja	1964	R. K. Shekhar	Kunchacko
Pearl View	1970	G. Devarajan	Kunchacko
Penmakkal	1966	Baburaj	M. Sasikumar
Penpada	1975	R. K. Shekhar	Crossbelt Mani
Ponnaapuram Kotta	1973	G. Devarajan	Kunchacko
Poochakkanni	1966	Baburaj	Puttanna Kanagal
Postmaane Kaanaanilla	1972	G. Devarajan	Kunchacko
Postman	1967	B. A. Chidambaranath	P. A. Thomas
Prathisandhi	1968	G. Devarajan	Adoor Gopalakrishnan
Prayaanam	1975	M. B. Sreenivasan	Bharathan
Premalekhanam	1985	G. Devarajan	P. A. Backer
Priyadarshini	1978	M. K. Arjunan	Peruvaaram Chandrasekaran
Priyamulla Sophia	1975	G. Devarajan	A. Vincent
Priye Ninakkuvendi	1975	R. K. Shekhar	Mallikarjuna Rao
Professor	1972	G. Devarajan	P. Subramaniam
Punarjanmam	1972	G. Devarajan	K. S. Sethumadhavan
Punnapra Vayalar	1968	K. Raghavan	Kunchacko
Puthanveedu	1971	Baburaj	K. Suku
Puthooramputhri Unniyarcha	2002	Usha Khanna, G. Devarajan	P. G. Vishwambharan
Puthrakameshti	1972	V. Dakshinamoorthy	Crossbelt Mani
Raagam	1975	Salil Chowdhury	A. Bhimsingh
Rajahamsam	1974	G. Devarajan	Hariharan
Raasaleela	1975	Salil Chowdhury	N. Sankaran Nair
Rahasyaraathri	1974	M. K. Arjunan	A. B. Raj
Rajani	1981	G. Devarajan	Unknown
Rebecca	1963	K. Raghavan	Kunchacko
Romeo	1976	G. Devarajan	S. S. Nair
Rowdy	1966	G. Devarajan	K. S. Sethumadhavan
Sabarimala Sree Dharmashastha	1970	V. Dakshinamoorthy, Jaya-Vijaya	M. Krishnan Nair
Sahadharmini	1967	B. A. Chidambaranath	P. A. Thomas
Sammanam	1975	V. Dakshinamoorthy	M. Sasikumar
Sandhya	1969	Baburaj	S. S. Vasan
Sandhyavandanam	1983	L. P. R. Varma	M. Sasikumar
Sarasayya	1971	G. Devarajan	Thoppil Bhasi
School Master	1964	G. Devarajan	Puttanna Kanagal
Sakthi	1972	V. Dakshinamoorthy	Crossbelt Mani
Shakunthala	1965	G. Devarajan	Kunchacko
Shiksha	1971	G. Devarajan	N. Prakash
Snapaka Yohannan	1963	Br Lakshmanan	P. Subramaniam
Sooryavamsham	1975	M. K. Arjunan	A. B. Raj
Sthanarthi Saramma	1966	L. P. R. Varma	K. S. Sethumadhavan
Suprabhatham	1974	G. Devarajan	M. Krishnan Nair
Soosi	1969	G. Devarajan	Kunchacko
Swami Ayyappan	1975	G. Devarajan	P. Subramaniam
Swapnabhoomi	1967	G. Devarajan	Puttanna Kanagal
Swapnangal	1970	G. Devarajan	P. Subramaniam
Swimming Pool	1976	M. K. Arjunan	M. Sasikumar
Thamarathoni	1975	R. K. Shekhar	Crossbelt Mani
Thara	1970	G. Devarajan	M. Krishnan Nair
Thaniniram	1973	G. Devarajan	M. Sasikumar
Thapaswini	1971	G. Devarajan	M. Krishnan Nair
Theekkanal	1976	K. J. Yesudas	Madhu
Thenaruvi	1973	G. Devarajan	Kunchacko
Thettu	1971	G. Devarajan	K. S. Sethumadhavan
Thilothama	1966	G. Devarajan	Kunchacko
Thirichadi	1968	R. Sudarsanam	Kunchacko
Thokkukal Kadha Parayunnu	1968	G. Devarajan	K. S. Sethumadhavan
Thomasleeha	1975	Salil Chowdhury, Sebastian Joseph	P. A. Thomas
Thommante Makkal	1965	Baburaj, Job	M. Sasikumar
Thottavadi	1973	L. P. R. Varma	M. Krishnan Nair
Thriveni	1970	G. Devarajan	A. Vincent
Thulabharam	1968	G. Devarajan	A. Vincent
Thulavarsham	1976	Salil Chowdhury, V. Dakshinamoorthy	N. Sankaran Nair
Thumbolarcha	1974	G. Devarajan	Kunchacko
Urangatha Sundari	1969	G. Devarajan	P. Subramaniam
Vaazhve Mayam	1970	G. Devarajan	K. S. Sethumadhavan
Velicham Akale	1975	R. K. Shekhar	Crossbelt Mani
Vezhambal (Ahalyamoksham)	1977	M. K. Arjunan	Stanley Jose
Vidhi	1968	Laxmikant-Pyarelal	A. Salam
Vidyaarthi	1968	B. A. Chidambaranath	M. Sasikumar
Vidyarthikale Ithile Ithile	1972	M. B. Sreenivasan	John Abraham
Vimochanasamaram	1971	M. B. Sreenivasan	Mohan Gandhiraman
Viplavakaarikal	1968	G. Devarajan	P. Subramaniam
Vishnuvijayam	1974	G. Devarajan	N. Sankaran Nair
Vivaaham Swargathil	1970	Baburaj	J. D. Thottan
Vivahasammanam	1971	G. Devarajan	J. D. Thottan
Vivahitha	1970	G. Devarajan	M. Krishnan Nair
Yakshagaanam	1976	M. S. Viswanathan	Sheela
Yakshi	1968	G. Devarajan	K. S. Sethumadhavan
