= List of Malayalam films of 1970 =

The following is a list of Malayalam films released in the year 1970.

Opening		Sl. No.	Film	Cast	Director	Music director	Notes
F E B	6	1	Saraswathi (1970)	Prem Nazir, Ragini	Thikkurissy Sukumaran Nair	M. S. Baburaj	
F E B	19	2	Ammayenna Sthree (1972)	Sathyan, Prem Nazir, KR Vijaya	K. S. Sethumadhavan	A. M. Rajah	
F E B	20	3	Anadha (1974)	Sathyan, Prem Nazir, Sheela, Vijayasree	J. D. Thottan	MS Baburaj	
F E B	27	4	Olavum Theeravum (1970)	Madhu, Ushanandini	P. N. Menon	M. S. Baburaj	
M A R	6	5	Kurukshethram (1974)	Sathyan, Sheela	P. Bhaskaran	K. Raghavan	
M A R	14	6	Nishagandhi (1974)	Prem Nazir, Sathyan, K. R. Vijaya,	A. N. Thampi	G. Devarajan	
M A R	28	7	Kalpana (1974)	Sathyan, Prem Nazir, Sheela	K. S. Sethumadhavan	V. Dakshinamoorthy	
A P R	10	8	Sthree (1973)	Sathyan, Sharada	P. Bhaskaran	V. Dakshinamoorthy	
M A Y	21	9	Ezhuthatha Kadha (1974)	Prem Nazir, Sheela	A. B. Raj	V. Dakshinamoorthy	
M A Y	29	10	Bheekara Nimishangal (1974)	Sathyan, Madhu	M. Krishnan Nair	MS Baburaj	
J U L	17	11	Rakthapushpam (1973)	Vijayasree, Prem Nazir	J. Sasikumar	M. K. Arjunan	
J U L	31	12	Nizhalattam (1970)	Sathyan, Prem Nazir, Sheela,	A. Vincent	G. Devarajan	
A U G	14	13	Othenente Makan (1973)	Sathyan and Vijayasree, Prem Nazir and Sheela, K. PUmmer and Ragini	Kunchacko	G. Devarajan	
A U G	15	14	Thurakkatha Vathil (1973)	Prem Nazir and Ragini	P. Bhaskaran	K. Raghavan	
A U G	21	15	Kuttavali (1973)	Sathyan, Sharada	K. S. Sethumadhavan	V. Dakshinamoorthy	
S E P	4	16	Abhayam (1974)	Madhu, Sheela	Ramu Kariat	V. Dakshinamoorthy	
S E P	11	17	Vivahitha (1973)	Prem Nazir, Sathyan, Padmini	M. Krishnan Nair	G. Devarajan	
S E P	11	18	Palunkupaathram (1973)	Prem Nazir and Sheela, Sathyan and Vijayasree	M. Krishnan Nair	G. Devarajan	
S E P	11	19	Ningalenne Communistakki (1970)	Sathyan, Prem Nazir and Sheela,	Thoppil Bhasi	G. Devarajan	
S E P	25	20	Nilakkatha Chalanangal (1972)	Sathyan, Madhu	K Sukumaran Nair	G. Devarajan	
O C T	2	21	Swapnangal (1970)	Geethanjali, Madhu	P. Subramaniam	G. Devarajan	
O C T	9	22	Kakkathamburatti (1972)	Prem Nazir, Madhu and Sharada	P. Bhaskaran	K. Raghavan	
O C T	15	23	Madhuvidhu (1970)	Jayabharathi, Vincent	N. Sankaran Nair	M. B. Sreenivasan	
O C T	28	24	Vivaham Swargathil (1974)	Prem Nazir, Sheela	J. D. Thottan	MS Baburaj	
O C T	29	25	Aa Chithrashalabham Parannotte (1973)	Prem Nazir, Sheela	P Balthasar	G. Devarajan	
N O V	7	26	Ambalapravu (1974)	Prem Nazir, Sheela	P. Bhaskaran	M. S. Baburaj	
N O V	14	27	Vaazhve Mayam (1974)	Sathyan, Sheela	K. S. Sethumadhavan	Devarajan	
N O V	14	28	Moodalmanju (1970)	Prem Nazir, Sheela	Sudin Menon	Usha Khanna	
N O V	14	29	Mindapennu (1971)	Prem Nazir, Sheela and Sharada	K. S. Sethumadhavan	G. Devarajan	
N O V	21	30	Nazhikakkallu (1969)	Prem Nazir, Sheela	Sudin Menon	Kanu Ghosh	
N O V	27	31	Priya (1970)	Madhu, Lilly Chakravarthi, Adoor Bhasi, Sukumari	Madhu	MS Baburaj	
N O V	28	32	Cross Belt (1973)	Sathyan, Sharada	Crossbelt Mani	M. S. Baburaj	
N O V	28	33	Lottery Ticket (1974)	Prem Nazir, Sheela	AB Raj	V. Dakshinamoorthy	
D E C	4	34	Thriveni (1970)	Prem Nazir, Sathyan and Sharada	A. Vincent	G. Devarajan	
D E C	11	35	Sabarimala Sree Dharmashastha (1970)	Thikkurissy Sukumaran Nair, Hari	M. Krishnan Nair	V. Dakshinamoorthy	
D E C	18	36	Pearl View (1971)	Prem Nazir, Sharada	Kunchacko	G. Devarajan	
D E C	18	37	Thara (1975)	Jayabharathy, Sathyan, Prem Nazir, K. PUmmer	M. Krishnan Nair	G. Devarajan	
D E C	24	38	Detective 909 Keralathil (1973)	K. PUmmer and Vijayasree	P. Venu	M. K. Arjunan	
D E C	25	39	Aranazhika Neram (1974)	Sathyan and Ragini, Prem Nazir and Sheela	K. S. Sethumadhavan	G. Devarajan	
D E C	25	40	Dathuputhran (1973)	Sathyan and Jayabharathy, Prem Nazir and Sheela, KP Ummer and Vijayasree	Kunchacko	G. Devarajan	
