= Ashwamedham =

- Poster
- Directed by: A. Vincent
- Written by: Thoppil Bhasi
- Based on: Ashwamedham by Thoppil Bhasi
- Produced by: Hari Pothan
- Starring: Sathyan; Prem Nazir; Madhu; Sheela
- Cinematography: P. Bhaskara Rao
- Edited by: G. Venkittaraman
- Music by: G. Devarajan
- Production company: Supriya Pictures
- Release date: 15 September 1967
- Country: India
- Language: Malayalam

Ashwamedham is a 1967 Indian Malayalam-language film, directed by A. Vincent and written by Thoppil Bhasi. It is based on Bhasi's play of the same name. The film stars Sathyan, Sheela and Prem Nazir in lead roles along with Madhu and Sukumari in supporting roles. The film follows Sarojam (Sheela), a woman who faces deep social exile and medical ignorance after contracting leprosy. A sequel, Sarasayya, was released in 1971.

== Cast ==
- Sheela as Sarojam
- Sathyan as Dr. Thomas
- Prem Nazir as Mohanan
- Madhu as Sadanandan
- Sukumari as Gely
- Adoor Bhasi as Manthravaadi
- P. J. Antony as Keshava Swami
- T. R. Omana as Mohanan's Mother
- Bahadoor as Health Visitor
- GK Pillai as Mohanan's Father
- Indira Thampi as Sarala
- Kambissery Karunakaran as Kushtarogi
- Junior Sheela
- Santha Devi as Lakshmi

== Soundtrack ==
The music was composed by G. Devarajan and the lyrics were written by Vayalar Ramavarma.

Song	Singers
"Ezhu Sundara Raathrikal"	P. Susheela
"Karutha Chakravaalamathilukal"	P. Susheela, Chorus
"Oridathu Jananam"	K. J. Yesudas
"Thekkumkooradiyaathi"	B. Vasantha
"Udayagiri Chuvannu"	P. Susheela
