= Priyadarshini (film) =

- Directed by: Peruvaaram Chandrasekaran
- Written by: Thulasi
- Screenplay by: Thulasi
- Produced by: Mrs. Parambi Kayamkulam
- Starring: T. R. Omana; Raghavan; Bahadoor; Jayasudha
- Edited by: G Venkittaraman
- Music by: M. K. Arjunan
- Production company: Mahal Productions
- Distributed by: Mahal Productions
- Release date: 10 March 1978
- Country: India
- Language: Malayalam

Priyadarshini is a 1978 Indian Malayalam-language film, directed by Peruvaaram Chandrasekaran. The film stars T. R. Omana, Raghavan, Bahadoor and Jayasudha. The film's score was composed by M. K. Arjunan.

== Cast ==
- T. R. Omana
- Raghavan
- Bahadoor
- Jayasudha
- Kottarakkara Sreedharan Nair
- M. G. Soman

== Soundtrack ==
The music was composed by M. K. Arjunan with lyrics by Vayalar Ramavarma.

No.	Song	Singers	Lyrics	Length (m:ss)
1	"Chirichu Chirichu"	S. Janaki	Vayalar Ramavarma	
2	"Kallakkanneru Kondu"	Jolly Abraham	Vayalar Ramavarma	
3	"Mangalaathirappookkal"	K. J. Yesudas	Vayalar Ramavarma	
4	"Pakshi Pakshi"	L. R. Eeswari	Vayalar Ramavarma	
5	"Pushpamanjeeram"	K. J. Yesudas	Vayalar Ramavarma	
6	"Shudha Madhalathin"	Latha Raju, Malathi	Vayalar Ramavarma	
