= Agni Pareeksha (1968 film) =

- Directed by: M. Krishnan Nair
- Written by: Tagore; Thoppil Bhasi (dialogues)
- Screenplay by: Thoppil Bhasi
- Produced by: M. Krishnan Nair
- Starring: Prem Nazir; Sathyan; Sheela; Sharada
- Cinematography: S. J. Thomas
- Music by: G. Devarajan
- Production company: Azeem Company
- Distributed by: Azeem Company
- Release date: 13 December 1968
- Country: India
- Language: Malayalam

Agni Pareeksha (transl. Trial by fire) is a 1968 Indian Malayalam-language film, directed by M. Krishnan Nair and produced by M. Krishnan Nair. The film stars Prem Nazir, Sathyan, Sheela and Sharada.

== Cast ==
- Prem Nazir as Ramesh
- Sathyan as Dr. Mohan
- Sheela as Hema
- Sharada as Hemalatha
- Adoor Bhasi as Unni
- Pattom Sadan as Manoharan
- T. R. Omana as Shankari
- T. S. Muthaiah as Raghavan
- Aranmula Ponnamma as Dr. Mohan's Mother
- C. A. Balan
- G. K. Pillai as Krishna Kurup
- K. P. Ummer as Gopal
- Panjabi
- Sree Subha as Sumathi

== Soundtrack ==
The music was composed by G. Devarajan and the lyrics were written by Vayalar Ramavarma.

Song	Singers
"Kairali Kairali Kaavya Kairali"	P. Susheela, Chorus, Renuka
"Muthuvaaraan Poyavare"	K. J. Yesudas
"Thinkalum Kathiroliyum"	P. Susheela
"Urangikidanna Hridayam"	K. J. Yesudas
