= Anaachadanam =

- Directed by: M. Krishnan Nair
- Written by: Thoppil Bhasi
- Screenplay by: Thoppil Bhasi
- Produced by: M. Raju Mathan
- Starring: Prem Nazir; Sheela; Sukumari; Jayabharathi
- Cinematography: T. N. Krishnankutty Nair
- Music by: G. Devarajan
- Production company: Thankam Movies
- Distributed by: Thankam Movies
- Release date: 3 January 1969
- Country: India
- Language: Malayalam

Anaachadanam is a 1969 Indian Malayalam-language film, directed by M. Krishnan Nair and produced by M. Raju Mathan. The film stars Prem Nazir, Sheela, Sukumari and Jayabharathi. The film has musical score by G. Devarajan.

== Cast ==
- Prem Nazir
- Sheela
- Sukumari
- Jayabharathi
- Adoor Bhasi
- T. S. Muthaiah
- Rani Chandra
- Santha Devi
- Vanakkutty

== Soundtrack ==
The music was composed by G. Devarajan and the lyrics were written by Vayalar Ramavarma.

No.	Song	Singers	Lyrics	Length (m:ss)
1	"Aripirivalli"	P. Susheela, B. Vasantha	Vayalar Ramavarma	
2	"Madhuchandrikayude"	P. Jayachandran	Vayalar Ramavarma	
3	"Mizhi Meen Pole"	P. Susheela	Vayalar Ramavarma	
4	"Oru Pootharumo"	P. Susheela	Vayalar Ramavarma	
5	"Penninte Manassil"	P. Jayachandran	Vayalar Ramavarma	
