= Shiksha (film) =

Indian film by N.Prakash

- Directed by: N. Prakash
- Written by: Thoppil Bhasi
- Screenplay by: Thoppil Bhasi
- Produced by: M. Azim
- Starring: Prem Nazir; Sathyan; Sheela; Kaviyoor Ponnamma
- Cinematography: S. J. Thomas
- Edited by: K. Narayanan
- Music by: G. Devarajan
- Production company: Azeem Company
- Distributed by: Azeem Company
- Release date: 5 February 1971
- Country: India
- Language: Malayalam

Shiksha (English: Punishment) is a 1971 Indian Malayalam-language film directed by N. Prakash and produced by M. Azim. The film stars Prem Nazir, Sathyan, Sheela and Kaviyoor Ponnamma in the lead roles. The film has musical score by G. Devarajan.

== Cast ==
- Prem Nazir as Shiva Sankaran
- Sathyan as Surendran
- Sheela as Shobha
- Kaviyoor Ponnamma as Meenakshi
- Adoor Bhasi as Krishna Pilla
- T. R. Omana as Thankamma
- T. S. Muthaiah as Ramunni Menon
- K. P. Ummer as Prabha
- Sadhana as Jayamala
- Vijayachandrika as Dancer
- Vijayasree as Dancer
- N. Govindankutty as Prathapan
- Paravoor Bharathan as Pankan Pilla

== Soundtrack ==
The music was composed by G. Devarajan and the lyrics were written by Vayalar Ramavarma.

No.	Song	Singers	Lyrics	Length (m:ss)
1	"Mallike Mallike"	P. Susheela	Vayalar Ramavarma	
2	"Pranayakalahamo"	K. J. Yesudas	Vayalar Ramavarma	
3	"Rahasyam Ithu Rahasyam"	P. Susheela	Vayalar Ramavarma	
4	"Swapnamennoru Chithralekha"	K. J. Yesudas	Vayalar Ramavarma	
5	"Velliyaazhcha Naal"	L. R. Eeswari	Vayalar Ramavarma	
