= Kudumbam (1967 film) =

- Directed by: M. Krishnan Nair
- Written by: Thoppil Bhasi
- Screenplay by: Thoppil Bhasi
- Produced by: Muhammad Assam
- Starring: Prem Nazir; Sathyan; Sheela; Adoor Bhasi
- Cinematography: U. Rajagopal
- Music by: R. Sudarsanam
- Release date: 1967
- Country: India
- Language: Malayalam

Kudumbam (transl. Family) is a 1967 Indian Malayalam film, directed by M. Krishnan Nair and produced by Muhammad Assam. The film stars Prem Nazir, Sathyan, Sheela and Adoor Bhasi in the lead roles. The film's musical score is by R. Sudarsanam.

== Cast ==
- Prem Nazir
- Sathyan
- Sheela
- Adoor Bhasi
- T. S. Muthaiah
- Pankajavalli

== Soundtrack ==
Sudarsanam composed the music to Vayalar Ramavarma's lyrics.

No.	Song	Singers	Lyrics	Length (m:ss)
1	"Baalyakaalasakhi"	K. J. Yesudas, S. Janaki	Vayalar Ramavarma	
2	"Chithraapaurnami Raathriyil"	K. J. Yesudas, S. Janaki	Vayalar Ramavarma	
3	"Pookkilanjorivechu"	L. R. Eeswari	Vayalar Ramavarma	
4	"Unarookanna Nee"	S. Janaki	Vayalar Ramavarma	
