= Kavalam Chundan (film) =

- Directed by: J. Sasikumar
- Written by: J. Sasikumar; Thoppil Bhasi (dialogues)
- Screenplay by: Thoppil Bhasi
- Produced by: V. P. M. Manikkam
- Starring: Sathyan; Sharada; Adoor Bhasi; P. J. Antony
- Cinematography: U. Rajagopal
- Edited by: Vijaya Rangan
- Music by: G. Devarajan
- Production company: Bhagavathy Pictures
- Distributed by: Bhagavathy Pictures
- Release date: 17 November 1967
- Country: India
- Language: Malayalam

Kavalam Chundan is a 1967 Indian Malayalam film, directed and co-written by J. Sasikumar and produced by V. P. M. Manikkam. The film stars Sathyan, Sharada, Adoor Bhasi and P. J. Antony in the lead roles, and features a musical score by G. Devarajan.

== Cast ==
- Sathyan
- Sharada
- Adoor Bhasi
- P. J. Antony
- Adoor Bhavani
- Adoor Pankajam
- Aranmula Ponnamma
- Kaduvakulam Antony
- Kottarakkara Sreedharan Nair
- Pankajavalli
- S. P. Pillai

== Soundtrack ==
The music was composed by G. Devarajan and the lyrics were written by Vayalar Ramavarma.

No.	Song	Singers	Lyrics	Length (m:ss)
1	"Aambal poove"	K. J. Yesudas, Chorus	Vayalar Ramavarma	03:46
2	"Akalukayo Thammil"	K. J. Yesudas	Vayalar Ramavarma	03:32
3	"Cheekiminukkiya"	S. Janaki	Vayalar Ramavarma	
4	"Kanniyilam Muthalle"	P. Susheela	Vayalar Ramavarma	
5	"Kuttanaadan Punchayile"	K. J. Yesudas, Chorus	Vayalar Ramavarma	03:00
