= Madhavikutty (film) =

Indian film by Thoppil Bhasi

- Directed by: Thoppil Bhasi
- Written by: Vaikkom Chandrasekharan Nair; Thoppil Bhasi (dialogues)
- Screenplay by: Thoppil Bhasi
- Produced by: Hari Pothan
- Starring: Madhu; Jayabharathi; KPAC Lalitha; Adoor Bhasi
- Cinematography: U. Rajagopal
- Edited by: G. Venkittaraman
- Music by: G. Devarajan
- Production company: Supriya
- Distributed by: Supriya
- Release date: 30 November 1973
- Country: India
- Language: Malayalam

Madhavikutty is a 1973 Indian Malayalam film directed by Thoppil Bhasi and produced by Hari Pothan. The film stars Madhu, Jayabharathi, KPAC Lalitha and Adoor Bhasi in the lead roles. The film has musical score by G. Devarajan.

== Cast ==
- Madhu
- Jayabharathi
- KPAC Lalitha
- Adoor Bhasi
- Sankaradi
- Sreelatha Namboothiri
- T. R. Omana
- Vijayakumar
- Bahadoor
- M. G. Soman

== Soundtrack ==
The music was composed by G. Devarajan and the lyrics were written by Vayalar Ramavarma.

No.	Song	Singers	Lyrics	Length (m:ss)
1	"Chirakulla Kilikalkke"	P. Madhuri	Vayalar Ramavarma	
2	"Maanathu Kannikal"	P. Jayachandran	Vayalar Ramavarma	
3	"Maveli Naduvaneedum Kalam"	P. Leela, Chorus	Vayalar Ramavarma	
4	"Sreemangalya"	P. Madhuri	Vayalar Ramavarma	
5	"Veeraviraatakumaara"	P. Madhuri, Chorus		
