= Thokkukal Kadha Parayunnu =

- Poster
- Directed by: K. S. Sethumadhavan
- Written by: Thoppil Bhasi
- Produced by: M. O. Joseph
- Starring: Prem Nazir; Sathyan; Sheela; Jayabharathi
- Cinematography: Melli Irani
- Edited by: M. S. Mani
- Music by: G. Devarajan
- Production company: Navajeevan Films
- Release date: 10 April 1968
- Country: India
- Language: Malayalam

Thokkukal Kadha Parayunnu (transl. Guns Tell the Story) is a 1968 Indian Malayalam-language crime thriller film, directed by K. S. Sethumadhavan and produced by M. O. Joseph. The film stars Prem Nazir, Sathyan, Sheela and Jayabharathi. It features a musical score by G. Devarajan.

== Cast ==
- Prem Nazir as Aniyankunju
- Sathyan as Raghu
- Sheela as Rema
- Jayabharathi as Thankam
- Muthukulam Raghavan Pillai
- Bahadoor
- K. P. Ummer as Raju
- Mala Aravindan
- Nellikode Bhaskaran
- Santha Devi as Raghu's mother

== Soundtrack ==
The music was composed by G. Devarajan and the lyrics were written by Vayalar Ramavarma.

No.	Song	Singers	Lyrics	Length
1	"Kannukal Ajnaatha"	K. J. Yesudas	Vayalar Ramavarma	
2	"Njan Piranna Nattil"	P. Susheela	Vayalar Ramavarma	
3	"Paarijaatham Thirumizhi"	K. J. Yesudas	Vayalar Ramavarma	
4	"Poovum Prasadavum"	P. Jayachandran	Vayalar Ramavarma	
5	"Premichu Premichu"	K. J. Yesudas	Vayalar Ramavarma	
