= Karinizhal =

- Directed by: J. D. Thottan
- Written by: P. Madhav; Parappurathu (dialogues)
- Screenplay by: Parappurathu
- Produced by: Kovai Ramaswamy
- Starring: Prem Nazir; Sathyan; Sheela; Sukumari
- Cinematography: P. Ramaswami
- Edited by: V. P. Krishnan
- Music by: G. Devarajan
- Production company: Sakthi Productions
- Distributed by: Sakthi Productions
- Release date: 14 April 1971
- Country: India
- Language: Malayalam

Karinizhal (Darkness) is a 1971 Indian Malayalam film directed by J. D. Thottan and produced by Kovai Ramaswamy. It stars Prem Nazir, Sathyan, Sheela and Sukumari in the lead roles and features a musical score by G. Devarajan.

== Cast ==
- Prem Nazir as Ramachandran
- Sathyan as Colonel Rajasekharan
- Sheela as Malathy/Baby
- Sukumari as Lourde Ammal
- Kaviyoor Ponnamma as Vishva Lakshmi
- Adoor Bhasi as Ayyappa Pilla
- William Thomas as Ravi
- Alummoodan as Devassya
- K. P. Ummer as Mohan
- Saleema as Nirmala

== Soundtrack ==
The music was composed by G. Devarajan and the lyrics were written by Vayalar Ramavarma.

No.	Song	Singers	Lyrics	Length (m:ss)
1	"Abhinandanam"	P. Susheela	Vayalar Ramavarma	
2	"Kaamaakshi"	K. J. Yesudas	Vayalar Ramavarma	
3	"Nirakudam Thulumbi"	K. J. Yesudas	Vayalar Ramavarma	
4	"Vallabhan Praana Vallabhan"	P. Madhuri	Vayalar Ramavarma	
5	"Vennakallu Kondalla"	K. J. Yesudas	Vayalar Ramavarma	
