= Sarasayya =

Indian film by Thoppil Bhasi

- Directed by: Thoppil Bhasi
- Written by: Thoppil Bhasi
- Produced by: P. V. Sathyam
- Starring: Sathyan; Madhu; Sheela; Jayabharathi
- Cinematography: V. Namas
- Edited by: K. Narayanan
- Music by: G. Devarajan
- Production company: Azeem Company
- Release date: 2 July 1971
- Country: India
- Language: Malayalam

Sarasayya (transl. The Bed of Arrows) is a 1971 Indian Malayalam-language film, directed by Thoppil Bhasi and produced by P. V. Sathyam. The film stars Sathyan, Madhu, Sheela and Jayabharathi. It is a sequel to the Malayalam film Ashwamedham (1967), and an adaptation of Thoppil Bhasi's play of the same name. It won the Kerala State Film Award for Best Film.

== Cast ==
- Sathyan as Dr. Thomas
- Madhu as Dr. Hari
- Sheela as Sarojam
- Jayabharathi as Sarala
- Kaviyoor Ponnamma as Dr. Thomas's Mother
- Adoor Bhasi
- Alummoodan
- KPAC Lalitha as Galy
- N. Govindankutty as Mohanan
- S. P. Pillai as Chacko
- Thoppil Krishna Pillai

== Soundtrack ==
The music was composed by G. Devarajan and the lyrics were written by Vayalar Ramavarma.

Song	Singers
"Choodaarathnam"	P. Madhuri
"Maahendraneela"	P. Madhuri
"Mukham Manassinte Kannaadi"	K. J. Yesudas
"Neelaambarame"	P. Madhuri
"Njan Ninne Premikkunnu"	K. J. Yesudas
"Uthishtatha Jaagratha"	P. Madhuri, M. G. Radhakrishnan
