= Puthenveedu =

- Directed by: K. Sukumaran Nair
- Written by: K. G. Sethunath
- Screenplay by: K. G. Sethunath
- Starring: Prem Nazir; Sheela; Jayabharathi; T. R. Omana
- Music by: M. S. Baburaj
- Production company: Soma Films
- Distributed by: Soma Films
- Release date: 29 October 1971
- Country: India
- Language: Malayalam

Puthenveedu (English: The New Home) is a 1971 Indian Malayalam-language film directed by K. Sukumaran Nair. The film stars Prem Nazir, Sheela, Jayabharathi and T. R. Omana in the lead roles. The film has musical score by M. S. Baburaj.

== Cast ==
- Prem Nazir
- Sheela
- Jayabharathi
- T. R. Omana
- T. S. Muthaiah
- Adoor Bhavani
- Bahadoor
- Kottarakkara Sreedharan Nair
- S. P. Pillai
- Veeran

== Soundtrack ==
The music was composed by M. S. Baburaj and the lyrics were written by Vayalar Ramavarma.

No.	Song	Singers	Lyrics	Length (m:ss)
1	"Ellapookkalum Chirikkatte"	M. G. Radhakrishnan	Vayalar Ramavarma	
2	"Kaattil Chuzhalikkaattil"	S. Janaki, Kamukara	Vayalar Ramavarma	
3	"Kayyil Malleeeshara"	S. Janaki	Vayalar Ramavarma	
4	"Neelevayalinu Poothirunaalu"	K. J. Yesudas, P. Susheeladevi	Vayalar Ramavarma	
