= Karakanakadal =

Indian film by K.S. Sethumadhavan

- Theatrical poster
- Directed by: K. S. Sethumadhavan
- Screenplay by: S. L. Puram Sadanandan
- Story by: Muttathu Varkey
- Produced by: Hari Pothan
- Starring: Sathyan; Madhu; Jayabharathi; Kaviyoor Ponnamma
- Cinematography: Melli Irani
- Edited by: T. R. Sreenivasalu
- Music by: G. Devarajan
- Production company: Supriya
- Release date: 3 September 1971
- Country: India
- Language: Malayalam

Karakanakadal (English: The Shoreless Ocean) is a 1971 Indian Malayalam-language film, directed by K. S. Sethumadhavan and produced by Hari Pothan. The film stars Sathyan, Madhu, Jayabharathi, Vincent, Sankaradi and Kaviyoor Ponnamma. It is based on the novel of the same name by Muttathu Varkey. The film won the National Film Award for Best Feature Film in Malayalam.

== Cast ==
- Sathyan as Thoma
- Madhu as Kariya
- Jayabharathi as Mary
- Kaviyoor Ponnamma as Tharathi
- Thikkurissy Sukumaran Nair as Muthalali
- Sankaradi as Peelipochan
- Shobha as Ammini (Child Artist)
- T. R. Omana as Akkachedathi
- Adoor Bhavani as Thoma's Mother
- Adoor Pankajam as Maria
- Alummoodan as Kunjaammoo
- C. A. Balan as Pulayan Mathai
- Kedamangalam Ali as Kollan Narayanan
- Meena as Kunjeli
- Murali as Mathaikkutty
- Paravoor Bharathan as Ickochan
- Vincent as Joy

== Soundtrack ==
The music is composed by G. Devarajan, with lyrics by Vayalar Ramavarma.

Track listing
No.	Title	Singer(s)	Length
1.	"Illarillam Kaattinullil"	P. Madhuri, Choir
2.	"Kaattu Vannu Kallane Pole"	P. Susheela
3.	"Njaalippoovan Vaazhappoo"	K. J. Yesudas
