= Oru Penninte Katha =

- Directed by: K. S. Sethumadhavan
- Written by: E. Moses
- Produced by: K. S. R Murthi
- Starring: Sathyan; Sheela; K. P. Ummer; N. Govindan Kutty; Adoor Bhasi; T. R. Omana
- Narrated by: Sathyan
- Cinematography: Melly Irani
- Edited by: Shrinivasalu
- Music by: G. Devarajan
- Distributed by: Chithranjali
- Release date: 22 January 1971
- Country: India
- Language: Malayalam

Oru Penninte Katha (A Women's Story) is a 1971 Indian Malayalam language film. It was written by E. Moses, directed by K. S. Sethumadhavan and produced by K. S. R Murthi. The film stars Sathyan and Sheela in lead roles along with K. P. Ummer, N. Govindan Kutty and Adoor Bhasi in supporting roles. The film has a musical score by G. Devarajan and cinematography was done by Melly Irani.

The film revolves around Savitri (Sheela), the daughter of a plantation worker, and her revenge against Madhavan Thampi (Sathyan), who arrests her lover on false charges and rapes her. The film takes some plot elements from the Hollywood film The Visit (1964). Some subplots of the film is used in another 2012 Malayalam film, Mr. Marumakan.

The film was released on 22 January 1971.

== Plot ==
Savithri is the only daughter of Govindan, who is employed in the tea estates owned by Madhavan Thampi. One day Madhavan Thampi spots Savithri singing near the stream and is attracted towards her. Raghavan is the local leader of the laborers. Rajan, another leader of the estate workers is involved in a criminal case framed against him by the estate owners and the police is in search of him. Rajan gets refuge in Savithri's house through Raghavan. Love blooms between Savithri and Rajan. One day Madhavan Thampi happens to see Rajan in his hideout. Savithri fears that Thampi may report it to the police. Her friend Thankamma advises her to approach Thampi and plead with him to not report to the police. Accordingly, Savithri reaches Thampi's bungalow and is raped by him. Thampi then informs the police and Rajan is arrested.

Savithri becomes pregnant, but Thampi disowns her. Govindan commits suicide and the helpless Savithri leaves town after giving birth to a child whom she leaves in the hospital. Thampi marries Subhadra and they live happily with their daughter Sreedevi. Mismanagement of the business by Thampi results in huge losses. Thampi's estate and property is bought by a rich woman, Gayathri Devi, who comes from Bombay. Thampi contests the Assembly elections and loses. Raghavan, who is a nominee of Gayathri Devi, wins.

Gayathri Devi repays Thampi's debts too and she files a suit against Thampi for recovery of money she paid to clear his debts. Thampi's house is about to be attached when Subhadra approaches Gayathri Devi with a request to wait till their daughter gets married.

Gayathri Devi narrates to Subhadra the reason behind her actions. Gayathri Devi is none other than Savithri, the daughter of Thampi's poor servant Govindan, who was abandoned by him mercilessly. After abandoning her newborn baby, Savitri became a prostitute and finally inherits a huge amount of wealth from a benefactor in Bombay.

Thampi writes a letter to Gayathri Devi, in which he tells Sreedevi that it is her own daughter whom he adopted from the hospital. Gayathri Devi transfers all her wealth into Sreedevi's name, but Sreedevi refuses to accept it and Gayathri Devi returns to Bombay.

== Cast ==
- Sathyan as Madhavan Thampi
- Sheela as Savithri/Gayathri Devi
- K. P. Ummer as Rajan
- N. Govindan Kutty as Raghavan
- Adoor Bhasi as Unnithan
- Sankaradi as Manager
- Muthukulam Raghavan Pillai
- T. S. Muthaiah as Govindan Mesthiri
- C. Narayana Pillai as Nair
- Paul Vengola
- T. R. Omana as Muthassi
- Jayabharathi as Thankamma
- Kaviyoor Ponnamma as Subhadra
- Paravoor Bharathan as Raman Nair
- Prema as Nun
- Junior Sheela as Sreedevi
- Abbas as Watchman

== Soundtrack ==
The music was composed by G. Devarajan with lyrics by Vayalar Ramavarma.

No.	Song	Singers	Lyrics	Length (m:ss)
1	"Kaadezhu Kadalezhu"	P. Jayachandran, P. Madhuri, Chorus	Vayalar Ramavarma	
2	"Maanavum Bhoomiyum"	P. Leela	Vayalar Ramavarma	
3	"Poonthenaruvi"	P. Susheela	Vayalar Ramavarma	
4	"Sooryagrahanam"	K. J. Yesudas	Vayalar Ramavarma	
5	"Sraavana Chandrika"	P. Susheela	Vayalar Ramavarma	
