= Daaham =

- Poster
- Directed by: K. S. Sethumadhavan
- Written by: Bilahari; Muthukulam Raghavan Pillai (dialogues); B. K. Pottekkad (dialogues)
- Screenplay by: K. S. Sethumadhavan
- Produced by: M. P. Anand; P. Rangaraj; V. Abdulla
- Starring: Sathyan; Sheela; Kaviyoor Ponnamma; K. P. Ummer
- Cinematography: P. Ramaswami
- Music by: G. Devarajan
- Production company: Thirumurukan Pictures
- Distributed by: Thirumurukan Pictures
- Release date: 22 October 1965
- Country: India
- Language: Malayalam

Daaham (Thirst) is a 1965 Indian Malayalam film, directed by K. S. Sethumadhavan and produced by M. P. Anand, P. Rangaraj and V. Abdulla. The film stars Sathyan, Sheela, Kaviyoor Ponnamma and K. P. Ummer in the lead roles. The film had musical score by G. Devarajan.

== Cast ==
- Sathyan
- Sheela
- Kaviyoor Ponnamma
- K. P. Ummer
- B. K. Pottekkad
- Prathapachandran
- A. M. Babu
- Bahadoor
- Indira
- Master Shaji
- Miss Barie
- K. S. Parvathy
- Sree Narayana Pillai
- Vijayan

== Soundtrack ==
All lyrics are written by Vayalar Ramavarma; all music is composed by G. Devarajan.

Track listing
| No. | Title | Artist(s) | Length |
|---|---|---|---|
| 1. | "Ekaantha Kaamuka" | P. Susheela, A. M. Rajah |
| 2. | "Kizhakku Kizhakku" | Renuka |
| 3. | "Padachavanundenkil" | C. O. Anto |
| 4. | "Vedana Vedana" | K. J. Yesudas |
