= Nishagandhi =

- Directed by: A. N. Thampi
- Written by: A. N. Thampi; S. L. Puram Sadanandan (dialogues)
- Screenplay by: S. L. Puram Sadanandan
- Produced by: Prabhakaran Sankara Nair
- Starring: Sathyan; Jayabharathi; Adoor Bhasi; Pattom Sadan
- Cinematography: N. S. Mani
- Edited by: K. D. George
- Music by: G. Devarajan
- Release date: 14 March 1970
- Country: India
- Language: Malayalam

Nishagandhi is a 1970 Indian Malayalam-language film, directed by A. N. Thampi. The film stars Sathyan, Jayabharathi, Adoor Bhasi and Pattom Sadan. The film had musical score by G. Devarajan.

== Cast ==
- Sathyan
- Jayabharathi
- Adoor Bhasi
- Pattom Sadan
- P. J. Antony
- Sankaradi
- T. R. Omana
- K. P. A. C. Azeez
- K. P. Ummer
- Khadeeja
- Kottarakkara Sreedharan Nair
- Vijayakala
- Vijayanirmala

== Soundtrack ==
The music was composed by G. Devarajan and the lyrics were written by O. N. V. Kurup.

No.	Song	Singers	Lyrics	Length (m:ss)
1	"Maniveena"	S. Janaki	ONV Kurup	
2	"Neelavaaname"	S. Janaki	O. N. V. Kurup	
3	"Neelavaaname" (Pathos)	S. Janaki	O. N. V. Kurup	
4	"Nishaagandhi Nishaagandhi"	K. J. Yesudas	O. N. V. Kurup	
5	"Oru Palunkupaathram"	P. Susheela	O. N. V. Kurup	
6	"Paathivirinjoru"	K. J. Yesudas	O. N. V. Kurup	
7	"Poovaalankili Poovaalankili"	S. Janaki	ONV Kurup	
