= Sheelavathi =

- Directed by: P. B. Unni
- Screenplay by: P. J. Antony
- Starring: Sathyan; K. R. Vijaya; P. J. Antony; Sankaradi
- Cinematography: Pachu
- Edited by: G. Venkittaraman
- Music by: G. Devarajan
- Production company: Aeris Films
- Distributed by: Aeris Films
- Release date: 3 March 1967
- Country: India
- Language: Malayalam

Sheelavathi is a 1967 Indian Malayalam film, directed by P. B. Unni. The film stars Sathyan, K. R. Vijaya, P. J. Antony and Sankaradi in the lead roles. The film had musical score by G. Devarajan.

== Cast ==
- Sathyan as Ugrathapassu
- K. R. Vijaya as Sheelaavathi
- P. J. Antony as Athri Maharshi
- Sankaradi as Thandulan
- T. R. Omana as Anasooya
- Nellikode Bhaskaran as Anangan
- S. P. Pillai as Sunethran
- Ushakumari as Saraswathi
- Vijayalalitha as Dancer
- Kottayam Chellappan as Maandavyan

== Soundtrack ==
The music was composed by G. Devarajan and the lyrics were written by P. Bhaskaran.

No.	Song	Singers	Lyrics	Length (m:ss)
1	"Chirichukondodi"	K. J. Yesudas	P. Bhaskaran	
2	"Kaarthika Manideepa"	S. Janaki, P. Jayachandran, Chorus	P. Bhaskaran	
3	"Maheshwari"	P. Susheela	P. Bhaskaran	
4	"Mathi Mathi Janani"	P. Susheela	P. Bhaskaran	
5	"Muttathu Prathyoosha"	S. Janaki	P. Bhaskaran	
6	"Surabheemaasam"	S. Janaki, Chorus	P. Bhaskaran	
7	"Uthareeyam"	S. Janaki	P. Bhaskaran	
8	"Valkkalamooriya"	K. J. Yesudas, P. Susheela	P. Bhaskaran	
9	"Vanee Varavanee"	K. J. Yesudas, P. B. Sreenivas, G. Devarajan	P. Bhaskaran	
