= Sandhya (film) =

- Directed by: Dr. Vasan
- Written by: Dr. Vasan; K Padmanabhan Nair (dialogues)
- Produced by: T. Komala
- Starring: Sathyan; Padmini; Sharada; Jayabharathi; Adoor Bhasi
- Music by: M. S. Baburaj
- Production company: Reetha Enterprises
- Distributed by: Reetha Enterprises
- Release date: 20 July 1969
- Country: India
- Language: Malayalam

Sandhya is a 1969 Indian Malayalam film, directed by Dr. Vasan and produced by T. Komala. The film stars Sathyan, Padmini, Sharada, Jayabharathi and Adoor Bhasi in the lead roles. The film had musical score by M. S. Baburaj.

== Cast ==
- Sathyan
- Padmini
- Sharada
- Jayabharathi
- Adoor Bhasi
- Muthukulam Raghavan Pillai
- Bahadoor
- K. P. Ummer
- Khadeeja
- Lakshmi

== Soundtrack ==
The music was composed by M. S. Baburaj and the lyrics were written by Vayalar Ramavarma.

No.	Song	Singers	Lyrics	Length (m:ss)
1	"Aadumuthe"	S. Janaki	Vayalar Ramavarma	
2	"Asthamanakkadalinnakale"	K. J. Yesudas, S. Janaki	Vayalar Ramavarma	
3	"Asthamanakkadalinnakale"	P. B. Sreenivas	Vayalar Ramavarma	
4	"Daaham Daaham"	S. Janaki	Vayalar Ramavarma	
5	"Kaaviyuduppumay"	P. B. Sreenivas	Vayalar Ramavarma	
