= Thacholi Othenan (film) =

- Poster
- Directed by: S. S. Rajan
- Written by: P. K. Sarangapani
- Produced by: T. K. Pareekutty
- Starring: Sathyan
- Cinematography: A. Vincent
- Music by: M. S. Baburaj
- Production company: Chandratara Productions
- Release date: 31 January 1964
- Country: India
- Language: Malayalam

Thacholi Othenan is a 1964 Indian Malayalam-language historical drama film directed by S. S. Rajan and starring Sathyan in the title role. The film won the National Film Award for Best Feature Film in Malayalam for the year 1964.

It was followed by Othenante Makan (1970) and Kadathanadan Ambadi (1990).

== Cast ==
- Sathyan as Thacholi Othenan
- P. J. Antony as Kathiroor Gurukkal
- Ambika Sukumaran as Kunki
- Devaki as Kunhikanni
- Adoor Bhasi as Ambu
- Kunhandy as Chaappan
- Sukumari as Unniyarcha
- Kottayam Chellappan as Payyanadan Chindan
- Master Prasad as Kunhambadi

== Soundtrack ==
Music by M. S. Baburaj. The song "Anjanakkannezhuthi" written by P. Bhaskaran and sung by S. Janaki was well received. A writer called the film's verses "evocative".

- 'Anjanakkannezhuthi' (S. Janaki)
- ‘Appam Venam Ada Venam,' (P. Leela, Santha P. Nair)
- ‘Kanni Nilavathu' (P. Leela)
- ‘Kottum Njaan Kettilla' (P. Leela & chorus)
- ‘Nallola Painkili' (P. Leela & chorus)
- ‘Naavulla Veenayanu' (K. P. Udayabhanu)
- ‘Ezhimala Kaadukali' (P. Leela & chorus)

== Reception ==
In a review of the film for The Hindu in 2012, B. Vijayakumar wrote that the film would be remembered "its excellent music and one of the best films in the popular ‘vadakkan paattu' genre". Sathyan's portrayal of Othenan was one of his landmark performances.
