= Anubhavangal Paalichakal =

- Poster
- Directed by: K. S. Sethumadhavan
- Screenplay by: Thoppil Bhasi
- Based on: Anubhavangal Paalichakal by Thakazhi Sivasankara Pillai
- Produced by: M. O. Joseph
- Starring: Sathyan; Prem Nazeer; Sheela
- Cinematography: Melli Irani
- Edited by: M. S. Mani
- Music by: Devarajan
- Production company: Manjilas Films
- Distributed by: Vimala Films
- Release date: 6 August 1971
- Running time: 133 minutes
- Country: India
- Language: Malayalam

Anubhavangal Paalichakal (transl. Experiences and mistakes) is a 1971 Malayalam-language film scripted by Thoppil Bhasi and directed by K. S. Sethumadhavan. It is based on the novel of the same name written by Thakazhi Sivasankara Pillai. The film stars Sathyan, Prem Nazeer and Sheela. It was the last film of Sathyan's career, who died before all the scenes were shot. This movie also marks the on-screen debut of Mammootty who appears as a junior artist.

== Plot ==
The film is set in the Punnapra-Vayalar-Haripad area of coastal Kerala, a hotbed during the Communist movement in Kerala in the 1950s. The story is about Chellappan a fiercely dedicated Communist and an employee at Chacko's business, where he has become a respected leader among the working class by organising pickets and strikes. He, however, neglects his family, abusing his wife Bhavani and their two children, a boy named Kuttappan (to whom Chellappan is indifferent), and a younger girl named Kumari (on whom he dotes). Chellappan is depicted as a man of weak moral fiber (he is shown to have a weakness for numerous other women). Moreover, he is highly suspicious of his wife Bhavani, who is still rather comely and of clean habits. He often accuses her of infidelity (the reason behind his indifference towards his son, as he believes that he's not his son's biological father), and often wonders whether his wife is having an affair with his friend Gopalan, another day-labourer. Due to this suspicion he constantly fights with and physically abuses his wife.

Life is depicted as a daily fight against hunger and hardship. One day, Chellappan is fired from his job by Chacko. A belligerent Chellappan happens to meet Chacko on a bylane and accosts him. A nervous Chacko escapes somehow and complains to the police of a possible threat to his life by Chellappan. The police come looking for Chellappan, but he has vanished underground, leaving behind his wife and children to fend for themselves. In order to support her family, bhavani joins the ranks of day labourers. Gopalan befriends her and offers her sympathy and a shoulder to cry on. After a while, despite her conscience, they soon enter into a relationship. Bhavani sells her house to a local businessman, who promises to get her another small parcel of land elsewhere where she can construct her own house. The children miss their father, especially the little daughter Kumari.

The local chapter of the Communist Party has now arranged temporary hiding for Chellappan with a family of humble working-class people, also Communist sympathisers, under a false alias 'Prabhakaran'. To them, he is an honoured, but mysterious guest, a minor celebrity. They shower him with honest warmth and affection; especially their grown-up daughter Parvathy, who harbours in her heart a desire for matrimonial union. Prabhakaran reads those subtle signals and tries to seduce her, but she does not succumb. He feels ashamed and realises he has been neglecting his wife and children, and travels back to his village incognito. There he learns that his wife has sold their old home and is now openly residing with Gopalan. Moreover, she is pregnant. Chellappan is remorseful, and starts blaming himself for the change of events. Without a word, he goes back to Ernakulam, but now he has changed significantly; he is deeply philosophical, and truly alone.

Wandering around the town, he notices some agitation outside the gates of a factory, organised by the local chapter of the Communist Party, agitating against the factory owner, whom they accuse for the disappearance of one Paulose, whose beautiful daughter was coveted by the mill owner. Soon some hired goons arrive, agents of the factory owner, and there is a scuffle. Chellappan joins the fight against the goons and inflicts injuries on the goons. The police arrive and briefly arrest Chellappan. However, the local Communist organisers are not impressed by this newcomer and remark darkly against him. However, his bravery is noticed by Hamza who runs a small ramshackle tea stall just outside the main gates of the factory. The goons have long terrorised Hamza and often take his stuff for free. Hamza the shopkeeper, now emboldened, shows scant respect to the factory-owner's goons, who then demolish his shack at night. The next morning Hamza rushes to see the ruins of his kiosk and vows revenge against the mill owner (a scene where Mammootty, is also present, as a young, clean-shaven, dhoti-clad bystander).

News reaches his hosts that his guest was none other than Chellappan and that 'Prabhakaran' was just an alias, and that he is married with two children. Parvathy gets disconsolate, and pines for Chellappan. After his release he comes back to his hosts where he has now become a real Communist celebrity and is greeted with simple pomp. That night, after everyone has gone to sleep, she goes to him and offers herself without reserve. But Chellappan is now a different person: he refuses and leaves the place.

Chellappan comes back to his village and visits his estranged wife at her new home. He learns from his son that his daughter has died of jaundice. Bhavani, now with baby in arm, meets him, and asks him to show love to his very own son Kuttappam. Chellappan now looks at his son with love, and blesses him tenderly, telling him to study, work hard and become a great man. He then departs, silently, without looking back.

Soon arrives that Chellappan has been arrested for the murder of the factory owner, and that Chellappan has given a full confession to the Police to that effect. Chellappan goes to trial, where he openly accepts blame for the crime. Consequently, he is found guilty and sentenced to death by hanging. As he is taken away to jail in a vehicle, the scene shows his ex-wife Bhavani, disconsolately running behind the van, crying, restrained by Gopalan: a very poignant scene. [Note: Sathyan the actor had already died (he was a terminally-ill cancer patient) and a double actor had to be employed for the finals scenes of this movie, especially this scene. In retrospect the grief displayed by Sheela seems real.]

News of his sentencing brings together all those who were close to him: Bhavani, Gopalan, Kuttappan, so also Parvathy and her family, who truly lament the loss of their beloved hero. The sentence is carried out. Bhavani and Gopalan bear the body back home in a rented car (for which they had mortgaged their land and house).

The final scene shows two mounds outside their house. A large for Chellappan and, next to him, a smaller mound, that of his beloved daughter Kumari.

== Cast ==
- Sathyan as Chellappan/Prabhakaran
- Prem Nazeer as Gopalan
- Sheela as Bhavani, Chellappan's wife
- K.P.A.C. Lalitha as Parvathi
- Baby Sumathi as Kumari
- Master Selvi as Kuttappan
- Adoor Bhasi as Ambalappuzha Rajappan
- Bahadoor as Hamza
- Sankaradi as Kochunni
- Philomina as Kochunni's wife
- T. K. Balachandran as Kumaran, Parvathi's brother
- Muthukulam Raghavan Pillai as Kurupu
- N. Govindan Kutty as Union President
- Paravoor Bharathan as local leader
- Gireesh Kumar
- A.T.Samuel (Sam)
- Mammootty (Junior Artist)

== Production ==
The film's principal photography occurred in various parts of Kottayam and Alappuzha districts. The interiors were filmed at Vikram, Bharani and Shyamala Studios. R. B. S. Mani was the art director.

== Soundtrack ==
The film has a successful soundtrack composed by Devarajan with lyrics written by Vayalar.

1. "Sarvaraajyathozhilalikale" — K. J. Yesudas, P. Leela & Chorus
2. "Kalyani Kalavani" — P. Madhuri
3. "Pravachakanmare Parayoo" — K. J. Yesudas
4. "Agniparvatham Pukanju" — K. J. Yesudas

== Reception ==
Kamal Haasan called it one of his favourite films and said "It had an astounding story [..] It was so suspenseful, so intriguing in the way it explored the human mind."
