= Kalithozhi =

- theatrical poster
- Directed by: D. M. Pottekkad
- Written by: Changampuzha; D. M. Pottekkad (dialogues)
- Screenplay by: D. M. Pottekkad
- Produced by: D. M. Pottekkad
- Starring: Prem Nazir; Sheela; Sathyan; Jayabharathi
- Cinematography: Chandra
- Edited by: K. Narayanan
- Music by: G. Devarajan; K. Raghavan
- Production company: Cine Kerala
- Distributed by: Cine Kerala
- Release date: 8 January 1971
- Country: India
- Language: Malayalam

Kalithozhi is a 1971 Indian Malayalam film directed and produced by D. M. Pottekkad. The film features actors Prem Nazir, Sheela, Sathyan and Jayabharathi. The musical score was composed by G. Devarajan and K. Raghavan.

== Synopsis ==
Amminikutty (Ammini) and Ravi are depicted as childhood friends who share everything. After they grow up, Ravi moves to Madras (Chennai) to look for work, but returns home after a few months. Ammini is excited to see him. They meet and realize that they are in love. However, Thamphi also loves Ammini, who doesn't reciprocate Thamphi's feelings, so Thamphi tries to separate Ammini and Ravi. One day, when Ammini comes back from Sarppakkavu, Thamphi tries to rape her. A witness rescues her. Thamphi then goes about saying that Ammini understands his feelings and everyone should accept their love. At first, Ravi doesn't believe the story but eventually, his mother and relatives prevail upon him.

When Ammini realizes Thamphi has been lying, she goes to Ravi's house. He avoids her and tells her never to see him again. Against his wishes, Raghavan's mother arranges his marriage to Murappennu Mallika. He is forced to marry. Afterwards, he beats his wife and abuses her verbally, forcing Mallika to go back to her parents. Ammini attempts suicide, but she is brought to elderly Dr Mathews whose saves her and asks her to marry him, but she doesn't accept because she still loves Ravi.

Dr Manuel doesn't understand why she refused his proposal. Eventually, he marries her. After a few days, Ravi sees Ammini in a hospital, finds out they are still in love and remember intimate moments from the past. Dr Manuel has lingering doubts about their relationship.

A few days later, Ammini finds out that she's pregnant. Dr. Mathews thought that Ravi is the person for her pregnancy. He commits suicide .

Ravi's mother tells her son to patch up with Mallika as she truly loves him. Ravi feels sorry and asks Mallika to forgive him. His mother sends him back to his new house.

Ammini, with the baby in hand, attempts suicide by lying on a railway track. Thamphi tries to stop her by saying that he loves Ammini more than anyone. He takes the baby. He steps backwards but when he turns around, Ammini is dead. He goes to Ravi and hands him the baby, saying that Ammini is dead and that they must take care of the child. Ravi refuses to look after the baby, but Thamphi explains he is this baby's father. Thamphi returns home.

== Cast ==
- Prem Nazir as Ravi
- Sheela as Ammini
- Sathyan as Dr. Issac Matthew
- Jayabharathi as Mallika
- Paul Vengola as Pilla
- Kaviyoor Ponnamma as Ravi's mother
- Alummoodan as Vaidyar Antony
- Kaduvakulam Antony as Puramboku
- Meena as Amritham
- N. Govindankutty as Keshavan Thampi
- T. P. Radhamani as Nurse

== Soundtrack ==
The music was composed by G. Devarajan and K. Raghavan and the lyrics were written by Vayalar Ramavarma and Changampuzha.

No.	Song	Singers	Lyrics	Length (m:ss)
1	"Athithikale"	P. Susheela	Vayalar Ramavarma	
2	"Gaayaka"	P. Jayachandran	Vayalar Ramavarma	
3	"Ilaneer"	P. Madhuri	Vayalar Ramavarma	
4	"Kanakachilanka"	Chorus, Radha	Changampuzha	
5	"Naazhikamaniyude"	P. Susheela	Vayalar Ramavarma	
6	"Priyathozhi"	K. J. Yesudas	Vayalar Ramavarma	
7	"Priyathozhi" (version 2)	K. J. Yesudas	Vayalar Ramavarma	
8	"Snehagangayil"	K. J. Yesudas	Vayalar Ramavarma	
9	"Snehagangayil" (bit version)	K. J. Yesudas	Vayalar Ramavarma	
