= Akkarapacha =

1972 film

- Directed by: M. M. Nesan
- Written by: Parappurath
- Screenplay by: Parappurath
- Produced by: Sukumaran/M. M. Nesan
- Starring: Sathyan; Jayabharathi; Kaviyoor Ponnamma
- Cinematography: P. B. Mani
- Edited by: G. Venkittaraman
- Music by: G. Devarajan
- Production company: VS Cine Arts
- Distributed by: VS Cine Arts
- Release date: 29 July 1972
- Country: India
- Language: Malayalam

Akkarapacha is a 1972 Indian Malayalam film, directed by M. M. Nesan and produced by M. M. Nesan/Sukumaran. The film stars Sathyan, Jayabharathi, Kaviyoor Ponnamma and Sunil in the lead roles. The film had musical score by G. Devarajan.

== Cast ==
- Sathyan as Vasudevan
- Jayabharathi as Janamma
- Kaviyoor Ponnamma as Bhageerathi
- Sujatha as Devaki
- Sunil as Vijayan
- T. R. Omana as Mariya
- Paul Vengola as Flirt
- Adoor Bhavani as Naaniyamma
- Alummoodan as Chellappan
- Bahadoor as Shivankutty
- Changanacherry Thankam
- K. P. Ummer as Bhaskaran
- Kollam Lalitha as Sarasamma
- N. Govindankutty as Bhargavan
- Pala Thankam as Saraswathi
- Puthuval as Pappu
- Ramankutty Menon as Kochachan
- Usha as Chellamma
- Vanchiyoor Radha as Janaki
- Baby Indira as Anandavally

== Soundtrack ==
All lyrics are written by Vayalar Ramavarma; all music is composed by G. Devarajan.

No.	Title	Artist(s)	Length
1.	"Aayiram Villodinju"	K. J. Yesudas, P. Madhuri
2.	"Bengal Kizhakkan Bengal"	P. Madhuri
3.	"Ezharapponnana"	P. Madhuri
4.	"Manassoru Mayilppeda"	K. J. Yesudas
