= Chathurangam (1959 film) =

1959 film

- Directed by: J. D. Thottan
- Written by: J. D. Thottan; Joshwa
- Screenplay by: Muthukulam Raghavan Pilla
- Starring: Prem Nazir; Padmini
- Cinematography: E. N. C. Nair
- Edited by: M. S. Mani
- Music by: G. Devarajan
- Production company: JJ Arts
- Release date: 10 September 1959
- Country: India
- Language: Malayalam

Chathurangam is a 1959 Indian Malayalam-language film, written and directed by J. D. Thottan. The film stars Prem Nazir and Miss Kumari, and features a musical score by G. Devarajan.

== Cast ==
- Prem Nazir
- Sathyan
- T. S. Muthaiah
- Jose Prakash
- P. A. Thomas
- Padmini
- Priyadarsini
