= Mindapennu =

- Directed by: K. S. Sethumadhavan
- Written by: Uroob
- Screenplay by: Uroob
- Produced by: V. M. Sreenivasan for Ambili Films
- Starring: Prem Nazir; Sheela; Sharada; Sukumari
- Cinematography: U. Rajagopal
- Edited by: G. Venkittaraman
- Music by: G. Devarajan
- Production company: Ambili Films
- Distributed by: Ambili Films
- Release date: 14 November 1970
- Country: India
- Language: Malayalam

Mindapennu (lit. 'Silent girl') is a 1970 Indian Malayalam film, directed by K. S. Sethumadhavan and produced by V. M. Sreenivasan. The film stars Prem Nazir, Sheela, Sharada and Sukumari in the lead roles. The film had musical score by G. Devarajan.

== Cast ==
- Prem Nazir as Chandran
- Sheela as Kamalam
- Sharada as Kunjulakshmi
- Sukumari as Pankajakshi
- Adoor Bhasi
- T. R. Omana as Dakshayani
- Bahadoor as Unnikrishnan
- Bhanji
- G. K. Pillai as Chandran's Father
- Paravoor Bharathan as Kunjappan
- Premji as Chandran's Ammaavan
- Vanchiyoor Radha

== Soundtrack ==
The music was composed by G. Devarajan and the lyrics were written by Yusufali Kechery.

No.	Song	Singers	Lyrics	Length (m:ss)
1	"Ambaadippaithale"	S. Janaki	Yusufali Kechery	
2	"Anuraagam Kannil"	K. J. Yesudas	Yusufali Kechery	
3	"Anuraagam Kannil"	P. Susheela	Yusufali Kechery	
4	"Inakkili Inakkili"	K. J. Yesudas	Yusufali Kechery	
5	"Kandaal Nalloru"	P. Leela, Chorus	Yusufali Kechery	
6	"Poomanimaarante Kovilil"	S. Janaki	Yusufali Kechery	
7	"Premamennal"	L. R. Eeswari, C. .O Anto	Yusufali Kechery	
