= Kalpana (1970 film) =

- Directed by: K. S. Sethumadhavan
- Written by: K. T. Muhammad
- Screenplay by: K. T. Muhammad
- Starring: Prem Nazir; Sathyan; Sheela; Sheela
- Cinematography: Melli Irani
- Edited by: P. V. Narayanan
- Music by: V. Dakshinamoorthy
- Production company: Selvam Productions
- Distributed by: Selvam Productions
- Release date: 28 March 1970
- Country: India
- Language: Malayalam

Kalpana is a 1970 Indian Malayalam film, directed by K. S. Sethumadhavan. The film stars Prem Nazir, Sathyan, and Sheela (in dual roles) in the lead roles. This was the first dual role for Sheela and the first ever well made, seamless double act in Malayalam cinema. The film had musical score by V. Dakshinamoorthy.

== Plot ==
Surendran joins a new company whose owner T S Muthaiah has twin daughters, Susheela and Sushama. Susheela is a traditional girl who wears traditional clothes and visits the temple frequently. Sushama is a modern girl who wears modern clothes and has a contemporary outlook. Muthiah wants to marry off one of his daughters to Surendran. Sushama falls in love with Surendran. Susheela on the other hand is in a relationship with Balan and has promised to marry him. Finally, the father decides to get Surendran married to Susheela and she doesn't object. This shatters Sushama. Balan too is shocked at Susheela's betrayal. Unable to stay in the same house as Surendran and her sister, Sushama leaves home and her father disowns her.

Sushama starts staying at Balan's home. Balan has a bedridden mother. Everyone thinks Balan and Sushama are a couple though they aren't. Muthaiah leaves all his property to Susheela in his will but on his death bed, he has a change of heart and wants to alter his will, but dies before it can happen.

Susheela doesn't want Surendran to know of her past and asks him to get Sushama married to Balan. Surendran thinks it is a good idea but Balan and Sushama resist the idea. Susheela gets pregnant in the meantime. Still in love with Surendran and unable to move past him, Sushama tries to commit suicide and Balan asks Susheela to come and see her. Susheela goes with him reluctantly and in a heated exchange of words, he slaps Susheela leading to her death. He quickly replaces Sushama with Susheela and fakes Susheela's suicide because he doesn't want to leave his bedridden mother helpless and alone. The police take Susheela's body for post-mortem where it is revealed that Susheela was three months pregnant.

The police finally deduce that Susheela died due to Balan and he is arrested. Sushama takes over the responsibility of looking after Balan's mother after his incarceration. Surendran asks Sushama to marry him and she accepts.

== Cast ==
- Prem Nazir as Surendran
- Sathyan as Balan
- Sheela as Sushama, Susheela and Kalpana
- Kaviyoor Ponnamma as Surendran's Mother
- Adoor Bhasi as Nanu
- T. S. Muthaiah as Kalpana's Father
- Meena as Lakshmi

== Soundtrack ==
The music was composed by V. Dakshinamoorthy and the lyrics were written by Vayalar Ramavarma.

| No. | Song | Singers | Lyrics | Length (m:ss) |
|---|---|---|---|---|
| 1 | "Amrithavarshini" | S. Janaki, L. R. Eeswari | Vayalar Ramavarma | |
| 2 | "Anuraagam" | K. J. Yesudas | Vayalar Ramavarma] | |
| 3 | "Kunnathe Poomaram" | S. Janaki | Vayalar Ramavarma | |
| 4 | "Prapanchamundaaya" | P. Leela | Vayalar Ramavarma | |
| 5 | "Vajrakireedam" | S. Janaki | Vayalar Ramavarma | |
