= Mooladhanam =

- Directed by: P. Bhaskaran
- Written by: Thoppil Bhasi
- Screenplay by: Thoppil Bhasi
- Produced by: M. Azim
- Starring: Sathyan; Premnazir; Sharada; Jayabharathi; K. P. Ummer
- Cinematography: P. R. Ramalingam
- Edited by: K. Narayanan; K. Sankunni
- Music by: G. Devarajan
- Production company: Azeem Company
- Distributed by: Azeem Company
- Release date: 15 August 1969
- Country: India
- Language: Malayalam

Mooladhanam (transl. Capital) is a 1969 Indian Malayalam-language film directed by P. Bhaskaran, written by Thoppil Bhasi and produced by M. Azim. The film stars Sathyan, Prem Nazir, Sharada and Jayabharathi in the lead roles. The film has musical score by G. Devarajan. The cinematography was handled by P. R. Ramalingam.

The film is set amidst the Communist movement in Kerala during the 1960s.

== Cast ==
- Sathyan as Ravi
- Prem Nazir as Mammootty
- Sharada as Sharada
- Ambika Sukumaran as Malathy
- Jayabharathi as Nabeeza
- Adoor Bhasi as Kuruppu
- Manavalan Joseph as I.D Kasimpilla
- Sankaradi as Hassanar
- Sreelatha Namboothiri as Chinnamma
- C.A. Balan
- K. P. Ummer as Madhu
- Kottayam Chellappan as Sharada's Brother
- Paravoor Bharathan as Nanu

== Soundtrack ==
The music was composed by G. Devarajan and the lyrics were written by P. Bhaskaran.

| No. | Song | Singers | Lyrics | Length (m:ss) |
|---|---|---|---|---|
| 1 | "Ente Veenakambiyellaam" | K. J. Yesudas | P. Bhaskaran | |
| 2 | "Olichu Pidichu" | P. Susheela | P. Bhaskaran | |
| 3 | "Oro Thullichorayil" | K. J. Yesudas, C. O. Anto, Venu | P. Bhaskaran | |
| 4 | "Pularaaraayappol" | P. Susheela | P. Bhaskaran | |
| 5 | "Swarga Gayike" | K. J. Yesudas | P. Bhaskaran | |
