= Sathyan (Malayalam actor) =

Indian Malayalam actor (1912-1971)

- Born: Cheruvilakathu Veetil Manuel Sathyanesan Nadar; 9 November 1912; Aramada, Thiruvananthapuram, Travancore
- Died: 15 June 1971 (aged 58); Madras, Tamil Nadu, India
- Resting place: Thiruvananthapuram LMS Compound
- Other names: Sathyan Master, Sathyan Mashu
- Occupations: Actor, Police inspector, soldier (Viceroy's Commissioned Officer), clerk, school teacher
- Years active: 1951–1971
- Spouse: Jessy Sathyan
- Children: Prakash Sathyan, Satheesh Sathyan, Jeevan Sathyan,
- Awards: 2 Kerala State Film Awards

Sathyan (born Cheruvilakathu Veetil Manuel Sathyanesan Nadar; 9 November 1912 – 15 June 1971) was an Indian actor known for his work in Malayalam cinema. Known for his own style and versatility in acting, Satyan was one of the pioneers of realistic acting in Indian film industry. He is respectfully called Sathyan Master. He was also a soldier in the British Indian Army and later a police officer with the Travancore State Police.

Sathyan served as an officer in the British Indian Army during World War II. After the war he joined the Travancore state police as an inspector in the late 1940s. During this time he got interested in acting and acted in amateur stage plays. He made his debut film in 1952 film Athmasakhi and rose to stardom with the critically acclaimed film Neelakuyil in 1954. He dominated the Malayalam film industry over two decades ( 1952 – 1971) along with his contemporary Prem Nazir.

He is remembered for his performances in Anubhavangal Palichakal (1971), Karinizhal (1971), Kadalpalam (1969), Yakshi (1968), Odayilninnu (1965), Udhyogastha (1967), Veettu Mrugam (1969), Vazhvemayam (1970), Oru Penninte Kadha (1971), Karakanakadal (1971), Pakalkinavu (1966), Ningalenne Communist Akki (1970), Kayamkulam Kochunni (1966), Sarasayya (1971), Rowdy (1966), Mooladhanam (1969),Chemmeen (1965), Ammayenna Sthree (1970), Kuttavali (1970), Crossbelt (1970), Adimakal (1969), Thacholi Othenan (1964), Aadyakiranangal (1964) and Mudiyanaya Puthran (1961).

Sathyan won the Best Actor Award at the inaugural Kerala State Film Award ceremony for his double role in Kadalpalam. He won the Kerala State Film Award for Best Actor again in 1971 for his film Karakanakadal.

== Personal life ==
Sathyan was born in Aramada, Thiruvananthapuram on 9 November 1912. His parents' names were Manuel and Emily. The eldest of five sons, his younger brothers were Chellayya, Neshan, Devadas, and Jacob. His family were Nadar Christians who belonged to the Anglican Church (C.I.B.C.) (later Church of South India (C.S.I.). Their family home in Aramada was called Cheruvilakathu Veettil.

Sathyan passed the Vidwan exam, equivalent to Master of Arts before joining St. Joseph's Higher Secondary School, Trivandrum as a teacher. After some time, he got job as a clerk in the Kerala Secretariat and worked there for about a year. He joined the army in 1941 and got posted as a Commissioned Officer of the Viceroy of India. He served the British army in Manipur, Burma (now Myanmar) and British Malaya (now Malaysia) during the World War II period. After finishing his term in the army, he returned home and joined the then Travancore State Police as a police inspector. During the Punnapra-Vayalar uprising in 1946, Sathyan was the inspector at Alappuzha North Police Station.

Sathyan was married to Jessy until his death in 1971. They have three sons: Prakash, Satheesh and Jeevan.

== Entry to films ==
Sathyan's entry into the field of acting started during his tenure as the police officer. At that time he acted in several amateur plays and that experience made him more interested in acting. His entry to film industry was accidental. He got introduced to a film musician Sebastian Kunjukunju Bhagavathar during his tenure as Inspector in Alappuzha North Police Station. The musician introduced Sathyan to various film personalities and one producer promised to cast him in a film; however, Sathyan did not get any calls from the producer. Sathyan came to know about a film that Kaumudi Chief Editor and his neighbour K. Balakrishnan were planning. He met Balakrishnan and the latter was impressed by Sathyan. Balakrishnan cast him as the protagonist in the film written and produced by him, titled Thyagaseema. The then Deputy Superintendent of Police, Mary Arputham, objected to Sathyan acting in the film. Sathyan resigned from his job to act in this film and shortened his name to Sathyan from Sathyaneshan. However, the film was dropped. Thyagaseema was also incidentally the first film for Prem Nazir.

In 1952 P. Subramaniam established Neela Productions. He happened to see the rushes of Thyagaseema and was impressed by Sathyan's performance. Subramaniam invited Sathyan to act as hero in his first film Athmasakhi (1952) which was Sathyan's first release.

== Film career ==
=== Rise to stardom ===
In 1952, Sathyan's first film got released. The film was titled Athmasakhi and it earned him recognition in the industry. Sathyan rose to fame with the legendary Neelakkuyil (1954). The film was also a milestone in Malayalam film history. It was the first film to have an authentic Malayalam story. The film was written by renowned literary figure Uroob and directed by Ramu Karyat-P. Bhaskaran duo. The songs in the film written by P. Bhaskaran and set to tunes by K. Raghavan were superhits. The film became the first Malayalam film to win national recognition when it was awarded the Rajat Kamal (Silver Lotus Award). The film's success at the box office raised Sathyan and his co-star Miss Kumari to stardom.

=== Peak time ===
Sathyan's career was influenced by great directors like K. S. Sethumadhavan, P. Venu, A. Vincent and Ramu Karyat. Sathyan's roles in various films directed by K. S. Sethumadhavan like Pappu in Odayil Ninnu, Jayarajan in Daham, Prof. Sreeni in Yakshi (first psychological thriller in Malayalam) and the pratogonist in Vazhve Mayam were well appreciated. Sathyan's other major performances include those in Udhyogastha, Snehaseema, Nairu Pidicha Pulivalu, Veettu Mrugam, Mudiyanaya Puthran, Bharya, Shakuntala, Kayamkulam Kochunni, Adimakal and Karakanakadal. His famous title character 'Othenan' in the film Thacholi Othenan became highly popular among the masses. His role in Chemmeen, the poignant love story set against the background of the coast of Alappuzha did not win him the best actor award for the year, but is one of the most popular roles of his career. He acted in over 150 Malayalam films and two Tamil films.

Sathyan won the first Kerala State Film Award for Best Actor in 1969 for the double role in Kadalpalam.

=== Final films ===
Vazhve Mayam, Anubhavangal Paalichakal, Karakanakadal which won high critical acclaim were among his final films. Other releases were Bhikara Nimishankal, Aranazhikaneram and Oru Penninte Katha (as Madhavan Thambi). Sathyan died before completing the movie 'Anubhavangal Paalichakal.' It is said that the expressions of Sathyan in the song 'Pravaachankanmare' in that movie is real because of the pain he suffered in real life. It is also said that, the final scenes of Sathyan in the movie are made with a dupe and the crying scene of Sheela in the climax is real because of the departure of Sathyan in real life. He was posthumously awarded the Kerala State Film Award for Best Actor in 1971 for his performance in Karakanakadal. Mammootty and Suresh Gopi debuted in film as child artists in Sathyan's movies. Mammootty in Anubhavangal Paalichakal and Suresh Gopi in Odayil Ninnu.

=== Death ===
Sathyan died of leukemia on 15 June 1971 at Madras, after fighting the disease for a year and four months. He was 58 years old. His body was taken back to his native place Thiruvananthapuram, and was buried with full state honours at CSI Mateer Memorial Church cemetery. Thousands attended his funeral. His wife outlived him by 16 years, dying in 1987. His eldest son Prakash Sathyan died on Vishu day in 2014.

== Accolades and legacy ==
Sathyan was a prominent actor to be considered as a superstar in Malayalam film industry after Thikkurissy Sukumaran Nair. During the late 1950s and the whole of the 1960s, he and Prem Nazir formed a bipolar industry with a considerable number of films starring at least one of them. He won the inaugural Kerala State Film Award for best actor in 1969 & again posthumously in 1971. There is a Sathyan Memorial Art Gallery in Thiruvananthapuram.

=== Awards and recognition ===
Kerala State Film Awards:

- 1969: Best Actor – Kadalpalam (First State Award receiver)
- 1971: Best Actor – Karakanakkadal

Film Film Awards:

- 1969: Adimakal

=== Popular roles ===
Below are a few of the most popular & critically praised characters played by Sathyan:

- Neelakuyil (1954) – Sreedharan Nair
- Thacholi Othenan (1964) – Othenan
- Odayil Ninnu (1965) – Pappu
- Chemmeen (1965) – Palani
- Yakshi (1968) – Sreeni
- Kadalpalam (1969) – Double Role
- Mooladhanam (1969) – multistarrer with Nazeer
- Vazhve Mayam (1970) – Sudhi
- Karinizhal (1970) – Colonel
- Anubhavangal Paalichakal (1971) – Chellappan
- Karakanakadal (1971) – posthumous state award winner

== Memorials ==
=== Awards established in his name ===
Sathyan National Film Award (Sathyan Foundation) : An award instituted by the "Sathyan Foundation" a charitable organization formed with the basic objective of perpetuating the memory of veteran actor Sathyan by his children and grand child. The "Sathyan National Film Award" is presented annually to an eminent personality of Indian cinema. Memento, certificate and Rs. 25000/- are given as award for the awardees.

- Winners: Murali, Thilakan, P. Bhaskaran, Balachandra Menon, Kalabhavan Mani, Sheela, Nedumudi Venu, Dileep, K. S. Chithra, K.J Yesudas, Kalabhavan Mani, Madhu, Sharada, Suresh Gopi, M. Jayachandran, Sreekumaran Thampi, Jerry Amaldev.

Sathyan Award: An award instituted by the Kerala Cultural Forum. The award carries a sum of Rs. 10000 and a plaque.

- Winner: Innocent (2007)

Sathyan Memorial Film Award: An award instituted by the Sathyan Memorial Arts and Sports Club. The award is given in various fields including Best Actor, Best Actress, Best Anti-Hero, Best Comedian, Best Newcomer and Best Singers (male and female), taking the last year's performances into consideration.

== Filmography ==
=== Malayalam ===
==== 1950s ====
Year	Title	Role	Notes
1951	Thyaagaseema		Unreleased film
1952	Aathmasakhi		
1953	Thiramala	Vijayan	
1953	Lokaneethi		
1953	Ashadeepam	Chandran	
1954	Snehaseema	Johny	
1954	Neelakuyil	Sreedharan Nair	
1955	Kalam Marunnu		
1956	Avar Unarunnu		
1957	Deva Sundari		
1957	Thaskaraveeran	Kumar/Maayavi/Khan Sahib	
1957	Achanum Makanum	Reghu	
1957	Minnunnathellam Ponnalla	Rajan	
1958	Lilly		
1958	Nairu Pidicha Pulivalu	Chandran	
1959	Chathurangam		
1959	Minnalppadayaali		

==== 1960s ====
Year	Title	Role	Notes
1961	Unniyarcha	Aromal Chekavar	
1961	Mudiyanaya Puthran	Rajasekharan Pilla	
1961	Arappavan	Vettukaaran Ramu	
1961	Krishna Kuchela		
1962	Bhaarya	Benny	
1962	Viyarppinte Vila	Gopi	
1962	Kannum Karalum	Mohan	
1962	Puthiya Akasam Puthiya Bhoomi	Sukumaran	
1962	Sreekovil		
1962	Vidhi Thanna Vilakku		
1962	Laila Majnu	Baqthum	
1962	Bhagyajathakam		
1962	Palattu Koman	Palattu Koman	
1963	Kadalamma	Neelan	
1963	Moodupadam		
1963	Ammaye Kaanaan	Chandran	
1963	Doctor	Rajendran	
1963	Nithyakanyaka		
1963	Rebecca	Johny	
1964	Pazhassi Raja	Baber	
1964	Kalanjukittiya Thankam	Sugathan	
1964	Thacholi Othenan	Thacholi Othenan	
1964	Anna		
1964	Manavaatti		
1964	Omanakuttan		
1964	Aayisha	Abubacker Sahib	
1964	Aadyakiranangal	Kunjukutty	
1965	Ammu	Shekharan	
1965	Kattuthulasi		
1965	Chettathi	Premachandran	
1965	Odayil Ninnu	Pappu	
1965	Devatha		
1965	Shyamala Chechi		
1965	Inapraavugal	Anthony	
1965	Kadathukaran	Ramu	
1965	Daaham	Jayaraj	
1965	Shakuntala		
1965	Chemmeen	Palani	
1965	Thommante Makkal	Pappachan	
1966	Koottukaar		
1966	Jail		
1966	Pakalkkinavu	Babu	
1966	Kayamkulam Kochunni	Kayamkulam Kochunni	
1966	Kallipennu		
1966	Station Master		
1966	Tharavattamma	Gopi	
1966	Thilothama		
1966	Anarkali	Akbar	
1966	Rowdy		
1967	Arakkillam		
1967	Pavappettaval	Gopi	
1967	Kudumbam		
1967	Ashwamedham	Dr. Thomas	
1967	Naadan Pennu	Chacko	
1967	Chekuthante Kotta	Lawrence	
1967	Ollathumathi		
1967	Postman		
1967	Udhyogastha	Rajan	
1967	Anweshichu Kandethiyilla	Thomas	
1967	Sheelavathi	Ugrathapassu	
1967	Kavalam Chundan		
1967	Swapnabhoomi		
1967	N. G. O.		
1967	Mynatharuvi Kolakase		
1967	Khadeeja		
1967	Thalirukal		
1967	Sahadharmini		
1968	Karthika	Kunju	
1968	Midumidukki	Ravi	
1968	Vazhi Pizhacha Santhathi		
1968	Pengal		
1968	Kaliyalla Kalyanam		
1968	Thokkukal Kadha Parayunnu	Raghu	
1968	Velutha Kathreena	Chellappan	
1968	Yakshi	Prof. Sreenivasan	
1968	Agni Pareeksha	Dr. Mohan	
1968	Manaswini		
1968	Aparadhini		
1969	Kuruthykkalam		
1969	Vilakkapetta Bendhangal		
1969	Kattukurangu	Prabhakaran	
1969	Koottukudumbam	Appukkuttan	
1969	Chattambikkavala	John Joseph	
1969	Mooladhanam	Ravi	
1969	Velliyazhcha	Ravi	
1969	Adimakal	Appukuttan	
1969	Urangatha Sundari	Vikraman Kartha	
1969	Kadalpalam	Narayana Kaimal, Raghu	
1969	Sandhya		
1969	Veettu Mrugam		

==== 1970s ====
Year	Title	Role	Notes
1970	Vivahitha	Ashok	
1970	Vazhve Mayam	Sudhindharan Nair	
1970	Nilakkatha Chalanangal		
1970	Thara	Balakrishna Pilla	
1970	Kuttavaali	Kedi Krishnan	
1970	Kalpana	Balan	
1970	Thriveni	Damodaran Muthalali	
1970	Ningalenne Communistaakki	Paramu Pilla	
1970	Othenente Makan	Othenan Kurup	
1970	Cross Belt	Rajasekharan Nair	
1970	Bheekara Nimishangal	Mancheri Raghavan	
1970	Dathuputhran	Kunjachan	
1970	Ammayenna Sthree	Advocate	
1970	Nishagandhi		
1970	Aranazhika Neram	Mathukkutty	
1970	Sthree		
1970	Kurukshethram	Balakrishnan	
1971	Kalithozhi	Dr. Issac Matthew	
1971	Vimochanasamaram		
1971	Karinizhal	Colonel Rajasekharan	
1971	Oru Penninte Katha	Madhavan Thampi	
1971	Karakanakadal	Thoma	
1971	C.I.D. In Jungle		
1971	Shiksha	Surendran	
1971	Moonnupookkal		
1971	Panchavan Kaadu	Ananda Kurup	
1971	Anubhavangal Paalichakal	Chellappan/Prabhakaran	
1971	Sarasayya	Dr. Thomas	
1971	Thettu	Johny	
1971	Kuttyedathi	Appunni	
1971	Agnimrigam	Mukundan	
1972	Lakshyam		
1972	Kalippava		
1972	Akkarapacha	Vasudevan	
1972	Baalyaprathijna	Chandran	
1973	Thenaruvi	Rajan's brother	
1973	Aashachakram	Ravichandran	
1974	Checkpost		

=== Tamil ===
Year	Title	Role	Notes
1960	Aalukkoru Veedu		
1967	Pesum Deivam		
