= Othenente Makan =

- Theatrical poster
- Directed by: Kunchacko
- Written by: N. Govindankutty (Story and dialogues)
- Screenplay by: N. Govindankutty
- Produced by: M. Kunchacko
- Starring: Prem Nazir; Sathyan; Ragini; Sheela; Kaviyoor Ponnamma
- Edited by: S. Williams
- Music by: G. Devarajan
- Production company: Udaya
- Distributed by: Udaya
- Release date: 14 August 1970
- Country: India
- Language: Malayalam

Othenente Makan (transl. Son of Othenan) is a 1970 Indian Malayalam-language action drama film directed and produced by Kunchacko. It is a sequel to the 1964 film Thacholi Othenan, followed by Kadathanadan Ambadi (1990). The film stars Prem Nazir, Ragini, Sathyan, Sheela and Kaviyoor Ponnamma. The film had musical score by G. Devarajan.

== Plot ==
The feudal families of Thekkumpattu and Vadakkumpattu have been friendly, though scheming, rivals in the region. The scions of the two families, Thekkumpattu Kunji and Vadakkumpattu Chandutty, are set to marry. However, when the Vadakkumpattu family conducts the yearly festival at the temple, the Vadakkumpattu family head makes sure that their own side of the fair eclipses that of Themkkumpattus'. In a fit of jealousy, the Thekkumpattu family head (Kunji's father) disturbs an elephant in order to spoil the charm, but in the ensuing chaos, the Vadakkumpattu family head is crushed by the elephant.

Chandutty learns that the Thekkumpattu head is responsible for his uncle's brutal death. Enraged, he attacks the Thekkumpattu family, kills the family head and all males and lays siege to the family, prohibiting any relations including marriage. As a result, Kunji becomes an orphan and a prisoner in her own house under the patrol of the soldiers of her ex-fiancé. She is left with nobody except a couple of trusted maids and servants. Chandutty himself is consumed in bitterness and anger, and distances himself from Kunji as well as normal family life.

One of Kunji's uncles, who was travelling, arrives. He tries to protect Kunji and trains her in martial arts, but is killed as soon as he is discovered by Chandutty's men.

One day, the legendary warrior from the north, Thacholi Manikkoth Othenan, finds himself at the door of Thekkumpattu house. Smitten by Kunji, he requests to be accommodated for the night. Kunji is no less smitten by the impressive Othenan as well. Othenan is accommodated unbeknownst to Chandutty's patrol. At this point Kunji wishes that she might bear a son who can avenge the insult that Chandutty has inflicted on her family. She pours her heart out to Othenan, winning his emotional support, and they consummate their relationship that night. Othenan leaves in the morning with a promise to return on the day of the coming festival to face off Chandutty, liberate Kunji and marry her.

When Othenan reaches home, his well-known courting of Kavil Chathothe Kunki means that he is expected to marry her on the day of the festival. Kunji realises that she is pregnant with Othenan's child. Her happiness is, however, short lived as she soon learns about Othenan and Kunki's marriage ironically from none other than the unsuspecting Chandutty who was invited. Kunji delivers her son, Ambu, and raises him clandestinely inside the house.

Twenty years later, Ambu has grown into a brave, able young man, trained in martial arts by Kunji. Ambu is allowed out to visit Lokanarkavu and return by the next morning. Along the way, Ambu meets Unnimathu, Othenan's niece. Othenan comes along the way and confronts Ambu. Othenan and Ambu have a war of words which leads to a challenge for duel between them. Meanwhile, Unnimathu is impressed by the young man's courage and they fall in love soon after.

Kunji is shocked to hear that her son must duel his father. During the duel, Ambu gives Othenan a tough time. Ambu survives Othenan's much feared signature strike "Thacholi Othiram". The puzzled Othenan is locked at swordpoint by Ambu, but Kunji who was present in disguise interferes before he is killed and reveals that Ambu is Othenan's son. An enraged Chandutty, realising that he was deceived, challenges them and is easily beheaded by Othenan.

== Cast ==
- Sathyan as Othenan Kuruppu
- Prem Nazir as Ambu
- Ragini as Thekkumpattu Kunji
- Sheela as Unnimaathu
- Vijayasree as Chathothe Kunki
- K. P. Ummer as Chandutty
- Adoor Bhasi as the Feudal Lord
- Kaviyoor Ponnamma as Naani
- Manavalan Joseph as Chappan
- Abbas
- Adoor Pankajam as Uppatti
- Alummoodan as Koman Nair
- G. K. Pillai as Kunkan
- Kanchana
- Kottayam Chellappan as Thekkumpattu Karnavar
- N. Govindankutty as Vadakkumpattu Karanavar
- Pankajavalli as Unnichara
- Premji as Thacholi Valiya Kuruppu
- S. P. Pillai as Anakkan
- KPAC Lalitha as Pullivathi
- Radhamani

== Soundtrack ==
The music was composed by G. Devarajan with lyrics by Vayalar Ramavarma.

No.	Song	Singers	Lyrics	Length (m:ss)
1	"Ankappattu Njorinjuduthu" (Bit)	K. J. Yesudas	Vayalar Ramavarma	
2	"Chandranudikkunna Dikkil"	K. J. Yesudas, B. Vasantha	Vayalar Ramavarma	
3	"Guruvayoorambalanadayil"	K. J. Yesudas	Vayalar Ramavarma	
4	"Kadaleevanangalkkarikilallo"	P. Susheela	Vayalar Ramavarma	
5	"Mangalam Kunnile"	K. J. Yesudas	Vayalar Ramavarma	
6	"Onnaanaam Kulakkadavil"	B. Vasantha, Chorus	Vayalar Ramavarma	
7	"Raamayanathile Seetha"	P. Leela, M. G. Radhakrishnan	Vayalar Ramavarma	
8	"Vellottu Valayittu"	P. Susheela	Vayalar Ramavarma	
9	"Yaamini Yaamini"	P. Susheela	Vayalar Ramavarma	
