= Ammayenna Sthree =

1970 film

- Directed by: K. S. Sethumadhavan
- Written by: K. T. Muhammad
- Screenplay by: K. T. Muhammad
- Starring: Prem Nazir; Sathyan; K. R. Vijaya; Ragini
- Cinematography: Melli Irani
- Edited by: M. S. Mani
- Music by: A. M. Rajah
- Production company: Chithranjali
- Distributed by: Chithranjali
- Release date: 19 February 1970
- Country: India
- Language: Malayalam

Ammayenna Sthree is a 1970 Indian Malayalam-language film, directed by K. S. Sethumadhavan. The film stars Prem Nazir, Sathyan, K. R. Vijaya and Ragini. The film has musical score by A. M. Rajah.

== Plot ==
Hari and Ravi are roommates. Their landlord Sanku Pillai's daughter Girija falls for Ravi. Hari also is in love with Girija, but never worked up the nerve to tell her. One night Ravi disappears after stealing Hari's money and valuables. Girija gets engaged to Sadanandan, but it turns out that she is pregnant with Ravi's child. Girija reveals the truth to Sadanandan and the wedding is called off at the last moment. A heartbroken Sanku Pillai commits suicide. Hari saves Girija from committing suicide and marries her. Hari's parents abandon him. Girija and Hari move to a new city to start a new life. A baby boy is born followed by a baby girl. Misfortune strikes again when Hari dies from police firing while he is near a protesting crowd.

After the funeral, Hari's father Gopala Pillai forcefully takes the daughter and leaves back to home. Girija follows them and takes the daughter. Gopala Pillai seeks the help of an advocate. He convinces Girija to leave the custody of the daughter to Gopala Pillai himself.

== Cast ==
- Prem Nazir as Hari
- Sathyan as Advocate
- K. R. Vijaya as Girija
- Ragini as Bhanu
- Jayabharathi as Bindu
- Kaviyoor Ponnamma as Jaanu
- Adoor Bhasi as Sanku Pilla
- Thikkurissy Sukumaran Nair as Sreedharan Pilla
- Sankaradi as Kittu Pilla
- Raghavan as Sasi
- T. S. Muthaiah as Gopala Pilla
- Bahadoor as Ramu
- K. P. Ummer as Ravi
- Paravoor Bharathan as Police officer
- Thodupuzha Radhakrishnan as Sadanandan
- Kottayam Santha as Ammini
- Usharani as Malathy

== Soundtrack ==
The music was composed by A. M. Rajah and the lyrics were written by Vayalar Ramavarma, or are Traditional. This is the only Malayalam film for which Rajah composed music, though he was a popular music director in Tamil and Telugu film industries.

No.	Song	Singers	Lyrics	Length (m:ss)
1	"Aadithyadevante Kanmani"	P. Susheela	Vayalar Ramavarma	
2	"Aalimali Aattinkarayil"	P. Susheela	Vayalar Ramavarma	
3	"Amma Pettamma"	Jikki	Vayalar Ramavarma	
4	"Madyapaathram Madhurakaavyam"	K. J. Yesudas	Vayalar Ramavarma	
5	"Nale Ee Panthalil"	A. M. Rajah	Vayalar Ramavarma	
6	"Pattum Valayum"	A. M. Rajah	Vayalar Ramavarma	
7	"Thamasso Ma Jyothirgamaya"	P. B. Sreenivas	Traditional	
