= Nilakkatha Chalanangal =

- Directed by: K. Sukumaran Nair
- Written by: Sunny Mammoottil; Kanam E. J. (dialogues)
- Screenplay by: Kanam E. J.
- Starring: Sathyan; Madhu; Jayabharathi; Jose Prakash
- Cinematography: C. J. Mohan
- Edited by: G. Venkittaraman
- Music by: G. Devarajan
- Release date: 25 September 1970
- Country: India
- Language: Malayalam

Nilakkatha Chalanangal is a 1970 Indian Malayalam-language film, directed by K. Sukumaran Nair. The film stars Sathyan, Madhu, Jayabharathi and Jose Prakash in the lead roles. The film had musical score by G. Devarajan.The film was produced by EK Sivaram for Santhi Productions Konni

== Cast ==
- Sathyan
- Madhu
- Jayabharathi
- Jose Prakash
- Alummoodan
- Aranmula Ponnamma
- Kottayam Chellappan
- S. P. Pillai
- Renuka

== Soundtrack ==
All lyrics are written by Vayalar Ramavarma; all music is composed by G. Devarajan.

No.	Title	Artist(s)	Length
1.	"Dukha Velliyaazhchakale"	P. Susheela
2.	"Madhyavenalavadhiyaayi"	P. Susheela
3.	"Priyamvadayallayo"	K. J. Yesudas
4.	"Sharathkaalayaamini Sumangaliyaay"	P. Madhuri
5.	"Sreenagarathile"	P. Jayachandran
