= T. R. Omana =

Indian film actress

- Born: Alappuzha, Kerala
- Occupation: Film actor
- Years active: 1950–present
- Parent(s): T R Gopala Pillai, P K Meenakshiamma

T. R. Omana is an Indian actress in Malayalam films. She mainly acts in supporting roles and mother roles. She has acted in more than 500 films.

== Personal life ==
T. R. Omana was born as the eldest among five children to T. R. Gopala Pillai, a timber merchant and P K Meenakshiamma, a housewife in Alappuzha. She has four younger sisters Lalitha, Padmaja, Geetha and Lekha. She had education till Intermediate (pre-university degree) which she did at Sanatana Dharma College, Alappuzha. She is a trained classical dancer. She is also a Kathakali artist and had given many stage performances. T. R. Omana never married.

== Career ==
Her family shifted to Chennai when her father had a big loss in business and to fulfill her dream of becoming actress. She made her debut with Nallathanka, a Malayalam movie in 1950, as a child artist. She continued to act in few movies as child artist. She was the heroine of movie Puthradharmam in 1954. She acted in mother role for the first time at the age of 23 in Veluthambi Dalawa in 1954. In 1968, she acted in the first full-length comedy in Malayalam cinema Viruthan Shanku directed by P. Venu. She lent her voice to Sharada in almost all her movies in Malayalam. She has also dubbed for Lilly Chakravarthy, Waheeda Rehman, Srividya, Lakshmi, Shuba etc. Tamil movie industry Nadigar Sangam honored her with Venthirevani for her contributions to movie industry.

== Partial filmography ==
=== As an actress ===
1. Sarvopari Palakkaran (2017)
2. Ente Priyapptta Muthuvinu (2000)
3. Nishasurabhikal (2000)
4. Megham (1999) as Ravivarma Thampuran's mother
5. Friends (1999) as Padmini's grandmother
6. Gloria Fernandes From U.S.A. (1998) as Ammachi
7. Maasmaram (1997) as Darsan Das's mother
8. Kannur (1997) as Sivankutty's mother
9. Ishtadhaanam (1997) as Muthassi
10. Sathyabhaamaykkoru Pranayalekhanam (1996) as Lakshmi
11. Punnaaram (1995)
12. Sargavasantham (1995) as Mariya
13. Maanikyachempazhukka (1995)
14. Vaardhakyapuraanam (1994) as Achamma
15. Nandini Oppol (1994) as Sundari's mother
16. Saubhaagyam (1993)
17. Samooham (1993) as Rajalekshmi's mother
18. Porutham (1993) as Bavaniyamma
19. Kizhakkan Pathrose (1992)
20. Maanthrikacheppu (1992)
21. Raajashilpi (1992)
22. Vietnam Colony (1992)
23. Kavacham (1992)
24. Karppooradeepam (1991) as Unni's mother
25. Ente Sooryaputhrikku (1991)
26. Adholokam (1988)
27. Bheekaran(1988)
28. Achuvettante Veedu (1987)
29. Ellaavarkkum Nanmakal (1987)
30. Ente Shabdam (1986) as Rajan's mother
31. Ithramathram (1986) as Shanthamma
32. Choodaatha Pookkal (1985)
33. Yathra (1985)
34. Aattuvanchi Ulanjappol (1984) as Murali's mother
35. Visa (1983) as Shareef's mother
36. Bandham (1983) as Gopi' mother
37. Anandham Ajantham (1983)
38. Ente Mohangal Poovaninju (1982)
39. Saravarsham(1982) as Devakiyamma
40. Ankachamayam (1982)
41. Lahari (1982)
42. Ponnum Poovum (1982) as Radha
43. Priyasakhi Radhe (1982)
44. Olangal (1982)
45. Ammakkorumma(1981)
46. Dwanthayudham (1981)
47. Pathirasooryan (1981) as Devakiyamma
48. Muthuchippikal (1980) as Bhargaviyamma
49. Aniyatha Valakal (1980) as Ganesh's mother
50. Karipuranda Jeevithangal (1980)
51. Ishtamaanu Pakshe (1980)
52. Chandrahaasam (1980)
53. Prakadanam (1980) as Preethi's mother
54. Sikharangal (1979)
55. Nithya Vasantham (1979)
56. Manavadharmam (1979)
57. Manushyan (1979)
58. Pennorumbattal (1979)
59. Vijayam Nammude Senani(1979)
60. Valeduthavan Vaalal (1979)
61. Allauddinum Albhutha Vilakkum (1979)
62. College Beauty (1979)
63. Indradhanussu (1979) as Janakiamma
64. Vijayanum Veeranum (1979) as Aaya
65. Sayoojyam (1979) as Madhavi
66. Kanyaka (1978) as Bhavaniyamma
67. Tharoo Oru Janmam Koodi (Thadavukaari) (1978)
68. Kanalkattakal (1978) as Lakshmiyamma
69. Kalpavriksham (1978) as Devakiyamma
70. Karimpuli (1978)
71. Aval Viswasthayaayirunnu (1978) as Johny's Mother
72. Vilakkum Velichavum (1978)
73. Snehathinte Mukhangal (1978) as Doctor
74. Rathinirvedam (1978)
75. Priyadarshini (1978)
76. Ashtamudikkayal (1978)
77. Nithyavasantham (1978)
78. Harshabashpam (1978) as Eliyama
79. Pichipoo (1978)
80. Theerangal (1978)
81. Mattoru Karnan (1978)
82. Hematharathri (1978)
83. Mattoru Karnan (1978)
84. Snehikkanoru Pennu (1978)
85. Manoradham (1978)
86. Gaandharvam (1978)
87. Anugraham (1977) as Kamakshiyamma
88. Samudram (1977) as Kamalamma
89. Pallavi (1977)
90. Muttathe Mulla (1977) as Lakshmiyamma
91. Abhinivesham (1977) as Devaki
92. Rathimanmadhan (1977)
93. Akshayapaathram (1977)
94. Sreemad Bhagavadgeetha (1977)
95. Ormakal Marikkumo (1977) as Thankamani
96. Aayiram Janmangal (1976) as Cheriyamma
97. Anubhavam (1976)
98. Mohiniyattam (1976) as Nalini
99. Maanasaveena (1976)
100. Swapnadanam (1976) as Gopi's mother
101. Chirikkudukka (1976)
102. Themmadi Velappan (1976) as Bhavaniyamma
103. Manishada (1975) as Karthyayani
104. Chief Guest (1975)
105. Kottaaram Vilkkaanundu (1975)
106. Sooryavamsham (1975)
107. Kalyaanappanthal (1975)
108. Love Letter (1975)
109. Padmaraagam (1975)
110. Chattambikkalyaani (1975) as Sethutty
111. Ayodhya (1975)
112. Alibabayum 41 Kallanmaarum (1975) as Naseema Begam
113. Panchathanthram (1974) as Gayathri Thampuratti
114. Night Duty (1974) as Devakiyamma
115. Bhoogolam Thiriyunnu (1974) as Gouriyamma
116. Thacholi Marumakan Chandu (1974) as Maakkam
117. Ayalathe Sundari (1974) as Saraswathiyamma
118. Arakkallan Mukkaalkkallan (1974) as Gouriyamma
119. Chandrakaantham (1974) as Teacher
120. Raajahamsam (1974) as Nanukuttans Mother
121. Sapthaswarangal (1974) as Omanayamma
122. Jeevikkan Marannu Poya Sthree (1974)
123. Alakal (1974)
124. Kaamini (1974) as Lakshmi
125. Pattabhishekam (1974) as Devaki
126. Maadhavikkutty (1973) as Kunjulakshmiyamma
127. Soundarya Pooja (1973)
128. Kaliyugam (1973) as Karthyayaniyamma
129. Interview (1973) as Shankari
130. Manushyaputhran (1973)
131. Azhakulla Saleena (1973) as Chinnamma
132. Udayam (1973) as Lakshmikutty
133. Manassu (1973)
134. Aphala (1973)
135. Football Champion (1973) as Soudamini
136. Thottavadi (1973) as Bhagiradhiyamma
137. Nakhangal (1973) as Pankiyamma
138. Sasthram Jayichu Manushyan Thottu (1973) as Devakiyamma
139. Bhadradeepam (1973) as Lakshmiyamma
140. Maaya (1972) as Easwari
141. Brahmachaari (1972)
142. Akkarapacha (1972) as Mariya
143. Miss Mary (1972) as Gouri
144. Naadan Premam (1972) as Paaru
145. Ananthasayanam (1972)
146. Mayilaadumkunnu (1972) as Rosamma
147. Sneehadeepame Mizhi Thurakku (1972) as Mary Fernandez
148. Ummachu (1971)
149. Thettu (1971) as Thankamma
150. Puthen Veedu (1971)
151. Sumangali (1971) as Lilly Simon
152. Shiksha (1971) as Thankamma
153. Karakanakadal (1971) as Akku Chedathi
154. Makane Ninakku Vendi (1971) as Eali
155. Oru Penninte Katha (1971)
156. Anaadha Shilpangal (1971) as Kamalamma
157. Poompaatta (1971) as Devaki
158. Vilaykku Vaangiya Veena (1971) as Nirmala Menon
159. Vimochanasamaram (1971)
160. Rathri Vandi (1971) as Lakshmiyamma
161. Kochaniyathi (1971) as Kamalamma
162. Ambalapraavu (1970) as Subhdara Thampuratti
163. Mindaapennu (1970) as Dakshyayani
164. Nilakkatha Chalanangal (1970)
165. Nishaagandhi (1970)
166. Ezhuthaatha Kadha (1970) as Mrs. Nair
167. Aa Chithrashalabham Parannotte (1970)
168. Naazhikakkallu (1970)
169. Kuttavaali (1970) as Radhakrishnan's Mother
170. Moodalmanju(1970) as Madhaviyamma
171. Nadhi (1969) as Mariya
172. Virunnukari (1969) as Surendran's mother
173. Veettu Mrugam (1969)
174. Padicha Kallan (1969) as Bharathiyamma
175. Kumarasambhavam (1969) as Avvayyar
176. Janmabhoomi (1969) as Mariya
177. Velliyazhcha (1969) as Parvathiyamma
178. Kannoor Deluxe (1969)
179. Vilakkappetta Bandhangal (1969)
180. Agnipareeksha (1968) as Shankari
181. Padunna Puzha (1968) as Bhavaniyamma
182. Velutha Kathreena (1968) as Dr. Sainabha
183. Vidyaarthi (1968)
184. Bhaaryamaar Sookshikkuka (1968) as Devaki Amma
185. Vazhi Pizhacha Santhathi (1968)
186. Viruthan Shanku (1968) as Kalyanikuttyamma
187. Sahadharmini (1967)
188. Madatharuvi (1967)
189. Pareeksha (1967) as Bhageeradhi
190. Mulkkireedam (1967)
191. Sheelavathi (1967) as Anasooya
192. Chithramela (1967)
193. Agniputhri (1967) as Muthassi
194. Postman (1967)
195. Kudumbam (1967)
196. Thalirukal (1967)
197. Balyakalasakhi (1967)
198. Ollathu Mathi (1967)
199. Ashwamedham (1967) as Mohanan's Mother
200. Jeevikkaan Anuvadikkoo (1967)
201. Kadamattathachan (1966)
202. Station Master (1966) as Pappadakkari
203. Sthanarthi Saramma (1966) as Ealikutty
204. Kallippennu (1966)
205. Rowdy (1966) as Sreedeviyamma
206. Kayamkulam Kochunni (1966) as Ayyappan Nair's wife
207. Porter Kunjali (1965) as Kunjipathumma
208. Shyamala Chechi (1965) as Padmavathi
209. Kochumon (1965) as Annamma
210. Devaalayam (1964)
211. Aadya Kiranangal (1964) as Pennukunju
212. Anna (Old) (1964)
213. Swargarajyam (1962)
214. Puthiya Aaksham Puthiya Bhoomi (1962)
215. Veluthambi Dalawa (1962) as Rebecca
216. Seetha (1960) as Malini
217. Naadodikal (1959)
218. Newspaper Boy (1955)
219. Puthradharmam (1954) as Leela
220. Manasaakshi (1954) as Sarala
221. Sandehi (1954) as Sudha
222. Ponkathir (1953)
223. Sheriyo Thetto (1953)
224. Lokaneethi (1953)
225. Premalekha (1952)
226. Rakthabandham (1951) as Kanchana
227. Omana (1951)
228. Chechi (1950)
229. Sasidharan (1950)
230. Nalla Thanka (1950)

=== As a singer ===
- "Udayatharaka Pole" - Mattoru Seetha (1975)
- "Kamini Mouliyam" - Mattoru Seetha (1975)
- "Nin Padhangalil" - Nazhikakkallu (1970)
- "Pandoru Shlipi" - Hotel Highrange (1968)

=== As a dubbing artist (Partial list) ===
| Year | Film | Character | Dubbed for |
|---|---|---|---|
| 1962 | Shantinivas | | |
| 1964 | Bhargavi Nilayam | Bhargavi's mother | Mala Shantha |
| 1966 | Pakalkkinavu | Malathi | Sharada |
| 1967 | Karthika | Karthika | Sharada |
| 1967 | Udhyogastha | Vimala | Sharada |
| 1968 | Thulabharam | Vijaya | Sharada |
| 1968 | Midumidukki | Radha | Sharada |
| 1968 | Agni Pareeksha | Hemalatha | Sharada |
| 1969 | Mooladhanam | Saradha | Sharada |
| 1970 | Thara | Vasanthi | Sharada |
| 1970 | Thriveni | Thankamma | Sharada |
| 1970 | Mindapennu | Kunjulakshmi | Sharada |
| 1970 | Crossbelt | Ammu | Sharada |
| 1970 | Sthree | Savithri | Sharada |
| 1970 | Priya | | Lily Chakravarty |
| 1971 | Lora Neeyevide | Lora | Ushakumari |
| 1972 | Swayamvaram | Seetha | Sharada |
| 1972 | Thrisandhya | Indu | Waheeda Rehman |
| 1972 | Manthrakodi | Valsala | Vijayasree |
| 1972 | Brahmachari | Vasanthy | Sharada |
| 1972 | Professor | Lakshmi | Sharada |
| 1972 | Pushpanjali (1972 film) | Usha | Vijayasree |
| 1972 | Maaya | Gomathy | Sharada |
| 1973 | Thekkan Kattu | Sosamma | Sharada |
| 1973 | Chuzhi | Elizabeth | Savitri |
| 1973 | Poonthenaruvi | Valsamma | Nanditha Bose |
| 1975 | Abhimaanam | Indu | Sharada |
| 1975 | Raagam | Priyamvada | Sharada |
| 1975 | Chattambikkalyaani | Kalyani | Lakshmi |
| 1976 | Mohiniyaattam | Anasooya | Kanakadurga |
| 1976 | Paalkkadal | Sujatha | Sharada |
| 1976 | Amritavahini | Geetha | Sharada |
| 1977 | Vishukkani | Rajani | Sharada |
| 1978 | Randu Lokam | Santha | Sharada |
| 1978 | Adimakkachavadam | Ponnamma | Shubha |
| 1978 | Maattoly | Malathy | Sharada |
| 1978 | Mannu | Paru | Sharada |
| 1978 | Etho Oru Swapnam | Sathyavathi | Kanakadurga |
| 1978 | Aaravam | Kaveri | Prameela |
| 1978 | Thamburatti | Ragini Thampuratti | Prameela |
| 1978 | Snehathinte Mukhangal | Savithri | Kanakadurga |
| 1980 | Adhikaram | Vimala | Sharada |
| 1980 | Ivar | Savithri/Margaret | Sharada |
| 1980 | Thaliritta Kinakkal | | Tanuja |
| 1982 | Elippathayam | Rajamma | Sharada |
| 1982 | Ponmudy | Madhavi | Sharada |
| 1982 | Anguram | Malini | Sharada |
| 1983 | Nizal Moodiya Nirangal | Shoshamma | Sharada |
| 1987 | Oru Minnaminunginte Nurunguvettam | Saraswathy amma tr | Sharada |
| 1990 | Innale | | |
| 1991 | Parallel College | | |

== Television ==
- Manasi (Doordarshan)
- Snehaseema (Doordarshan)
- Pennurimai (Doordarshan)
- Kazhcha (Surya TV)
- Nirmalayam (Asianet)
- Ninavugalae Neengividu (DD Podhigai)
- Chandanamazha (Asianet) as Mahathiyamma
- Deivam Thandha Veedu (Star Vijay) as Annapoorani -Tamil
- Rani Maharani (Reality Show)
- Kanmani (Sun TV Tamil)

== Awards ==
- Honour by Nadigar Sangam with "Venthirevani"
- Honour by Friends of Arts& Cultural Entertainments (FACE Dubai) - "Thriveni Sangamam" 2013
- Flowers TV Awards 2015- Life Time Achievement Award ( Chandanamazha)
- Asianet Television awards 2016 - Life Time Achievement Award ( Chandanamazha)
- Honour by Kerala State Film Awards 2019
