= Thoppil Bhasi =

Indian playwright (1924–1992)

- തോപ്പിൽ ഭാസി
- Born: Thoppil Bhaskara Pillai; 8 April 1924; Vallikunnam, Kingdom of Travancore, British India (present day Alappuzha, Kerala, India)
- Died: 8 December 1992 (aged 68)
- Occupations: Playwright; Script writer; Film director
- Spouse: Amminiamma
- Children: 5 (incl. Ajayan)
- Writing career
- Language: Malayalam
- Notable awards: Kerala Sahitya Akademi Award; Kerala Sangeetha Nataka Academy; Prof. N. Krishna Pillai Award; Soviet Land Nehru Award

Thoppil Bhaskara Pillai, known as Thoppil Bhasi (8 April 1924 – 8 December 1992) was an Indian Malayalam-language playwright, screenwriter, and film director. He was associated with the communist movement in Kerala and his play Ningalenne Communistakki (You Made Me a Communist) is considered to be a groundbreaking event in the history of Malayalam theatre.

== Early life ==
Thoppil Bhaskara Pillai was born on 8 April 1924 at Vallikunnam in the erstwhile Kingdom of Travancore. Bhasi was the eldest son of Thoppil Parameshwaran Pillai and Nanikkutti Amma.

=== Education ===
His elementary education was at the SNDP Sanskrit School, and later on at the Sanskrit School, Changankulangara, from where he graduated in the Sanskrit Shastri course. Knowing fully well his desire to learn indigenous medicine, his father had him enrolled at the Ayurveda College, Thiruvananthapuram. It was here that he spearheaded the Students' Agitation that led to installing many of the facilities and rights enjoyed currently by students at the College of Ayurveda. He also graduated securing the top rank in the Vaidya Kalanidhi examination.

== Social life ==
His deep and enduring friendship with Kambisseri Karunakaran that extended through all spheres of their lives, also saw them at the forefront of some of the most significant political agitations in central Kerala. Once a staunch supporter and activist of the Indian Congress party, Thoppil Bhasi soon distanced himself from the same on matters of principles and found his direction in the neo movement of Communism via the Communist Party of India. He was associated with the communist movements that took place in Kerala during the 1940s and 1950s. Branded a Subversive and a Wanted Man by the government, he was on the run and went underground during the period of 1948–52, as a top priority suspect in the infamous Sooranad Incident, with a Rs 1000 bounty on his head. He was later acquitted, and went on to contest the first Panchayat elections in Kerala. He won, becoming the first president of the Vallikunnom panchayat. He was elected twice to the state assembly contesting the State elections, from Bharanikkavu in 1954 against Pushpathadom Raghavan a prominent congress leader and close associate to Jawaharlal Nehru and Pathanamthitta in 1957.

=== KPAC, theatre and Malayalam films ===
Thoppil Bhasi never contested any more elections post his 1957 win, to devote his entire energies to this new direction his life has set course on – theatre. He had written his first One-act play Munnettam (The Advance) while on the run from the state, and based on the feedback received from the underground collective, had revisited, refined and re-energised the plot from a different perspective, creating the historical Ningalenne Communistaakki, both under his pseudonym Soman, for fear of revealing his true identity. The drama helped KPAC to become a force to reckon with on Kerala's theatrical arena. Later, he wrote scripts for 110 Malayalam films starting from 'Mudiyanaya Puthran' in 1961.

His association with KPAC started with the staging of Ningalenne Communistaakki, and the entire proceedings from the show were donated towards the attorney fees needed to free the rest of accused in the Soornad Incident. He wrote the play Ningalenne Communistakki while in hiding in connection with the Sooranad case, which resulted from a revolt by agricultural workers against a landlord. Bhasi had to write the play under the name, Soman. Ningalenne Communistakki was first staged (under the banner of KPAC) in Chavara in Kollam district on 6 December 1952. He wrote 16 plays, for KPAC, each more spectacular and socially relevant than its predecessor and it used to be said in the 60s and 70s that there wasn't a day where at least one of his plays was not staged at any part of Kerala! Such was the influence of his creative power. From KPAC, he slowly moved to the film industry (some say it was a natural progression), authoring over 100 Screenplays and turned to directing 16 movies in Malayalam language, most of them box-office successes.

=== Stageplays by Thoppil Bhasi ===
- Ningalenne Communistakki (1952)
- Sarvekkallu (1954)
- Vishakkunna Karinkali (1954)
- Shelter (1956)
- Mudiyanaya Puthran (1957)
- Mooladhanam (1958)
- Azhiyatha Kettukal (1958)
- Puthiya Aaksaham, Puthiya Bhoomi (1959)
- Premavum Thyagavum (1960)
- Anthyavym Thudakkavum (1961)
- Ashwamedham (1962)
- Sharashayya (1964)
- Yudhdhakaandam (1965)
- Koottukudumbam (1967)
- Thulabharam (1968)
- Innale, Innu Naale (1972)
- Layanam (1974)
- Kayyum Thalayum Purathidaruthu (1980)
- Sookshikkuka, Idathuvasham Povuka (1984)
- Mrichchakadikam (translation from Sanskrit, 1985)
- Shakunthalam translation from Sanskrit, 1987)
- Panchali (1987)
- Rajani (1988)
- Olivile Ormakal (drama adaptation of Thoppil Bhasi's autobiography)

== Awards and recognition ==
Thoppil Bhasi's dramas, Mudiyanaya Puthran and Puthiya Akasham, Puthiya Bhumi were awarded the Kerala Sahitya Akademi Award, and the Kerala Sangeetha Nataka Academy awarded him its fellowship in 1981. He is also the recipient of the Prof. N. Krishna Pillai Award and the Soviet Land Nehru Award. He also was awarded the Kerala State Film Award for Best Film for directing Sarasayya in 1971 and the Kerala State Film Award for Best Story for Mooladhanam in 1969.

== Literary works ==
Thoppil Bhasi was prolific in terms of his creative output during his active years in theatre and movies. He authored 16 full-length plays, screenplays for over 100 movies, directed 16 movies and his autobiography was titled, Oliviley Ormakal. He was a regular contributor to the Janayugom Magazine and short stories to various publications which are yet to be collated and archived.

=== Significant books written by Thoppil Bhasi which influenced the politics of Kerala for many years to come ===
1. Ningalenne Communistakki: a dramha which has influenced the politics of Kerala > Ningalenne Communistakki-. 31 January 2020.
2. Olivile Ormmakal: Memoir that throws light on the lives of many unsung communists leaders > Olivile Ormmakal-. 31 December 2019.
3. Thulabharam and many screen plays.

== Death ==
Thoppil Bhasi died on 8 December 1992, after suffering from poor health for years. He was aged 68 then. His body was cremated with full state honours at the premises of his home the next day.

== Filmography ==
Director

- Ningalenne Communistakki (1970)
- Sarasayya (1971)
- Oru Sundariyude Katha (1972)
- Eanippadikal (1973)
- Madhavikutty (1973)
- Chakravakam (1974)
- Mucheettukalikkarante Makal (1975)
- Ponni (1976)
- Missi (1976)
- Yudhakaandam (1977)
- Mochanam (1979)
- Ente Neelakaasham (1979)

Writer

- Mudiyanaya Puthran (1961)
- Aadyakiranangal (1964)
- Adimakal (1969)
- Thulabharam (1968)
- Vivahitha (1970)
- Anubhavangal Paalichakal (1971)
- Chattakkari (1974)
- Sandhyakku Virinja Poovu (1983)
- Ente Upasana (1984)
