= Vayalar Ramavarma =

Indian poet and lyricist (1928–1975)

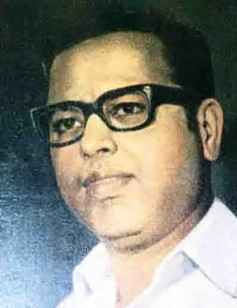
- Born: 25 March 1928; Vayalar, Alappuzha, Travancore, India
- Died: 27 October 1975 (aged 47); Government Medical College, Thiruvananthapuram
- Occupations: Lyricist, poet
- Spouses: Chandramathi Thamburatti (m. 1951–1956); Bharathi Thamburatti (m. 1957)
- Children: 4, including Vayalar Sarath Chandra Varma
- Parents: Kerala Varma; Ambalika Thamburatti
- Writing career
- Years active: 1956–1975
- Genres: Poetry, lyrics
- Notable works: Paadamudrakal; Enikku Maranamilla; Oru Judas Janikkunnu; Ente Maattolikkavithakal
- Notable awards: 1962 Kerala Sahitya Akademi Award for Poetry; 1969 Kerala State Film Award for Best Lyrics; 1972 National Film Award for Best Lyrics; 1972 Kerala State Film Award for Best Lyrics; 1974 Kerala State Film Award for Best Lyrics; 1975 Kerala State Film Award for Best Lyrics

Vayalar Ramavarma (25 March 1928 – 27 October 1975), also known as Rama Varma Vayalar or simply, Vayalar, was an Indian poet and lyricist of Malayalam language. He is known for his poems, including Sargasangeetham, Mulankaadu, Aayisha, and Oru Judas janikkunnu, and for around 1,300 songs he penned for 256 Malayalam films. He received the National Film Award for Best Lyrics in 1972 and was the winner of the Kerala State Film Award for Best Lyricist in its year of inception which he received three more times. He was also a recipient of the Kerala Sahitya Akademi Award for Poetry in 1962. His collaborations with G. Devarajan produced the golden era of Malayalam film music and many songs written and composed by this duo remain classics in Malayalam. Ramavarma is regarded as one of the most successful and critically acclaimed lyricist in the history of Malayalam cinema.

== Biography ==
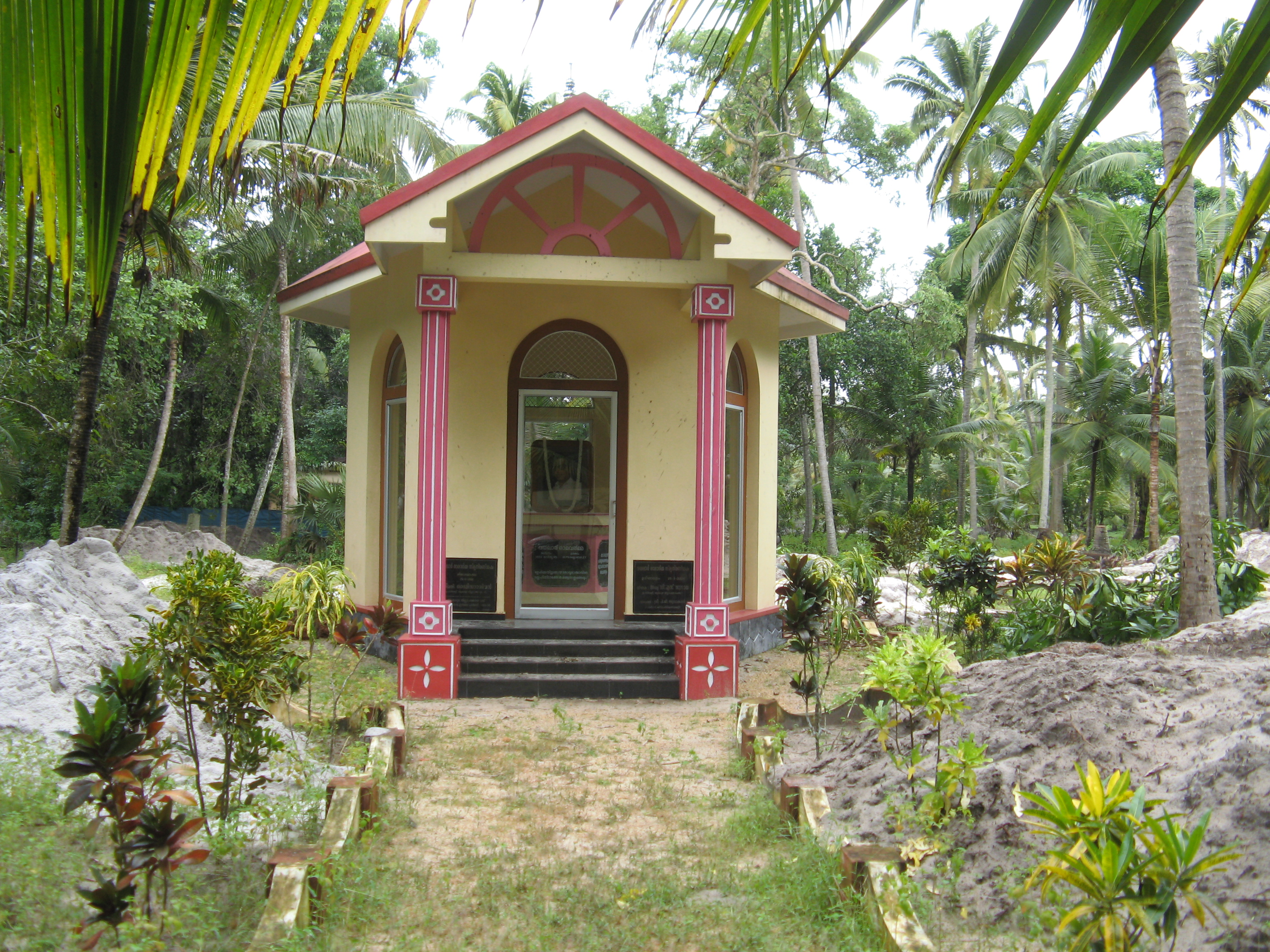
The memorial at the poet's home Raghavaparambu, in Vayalar

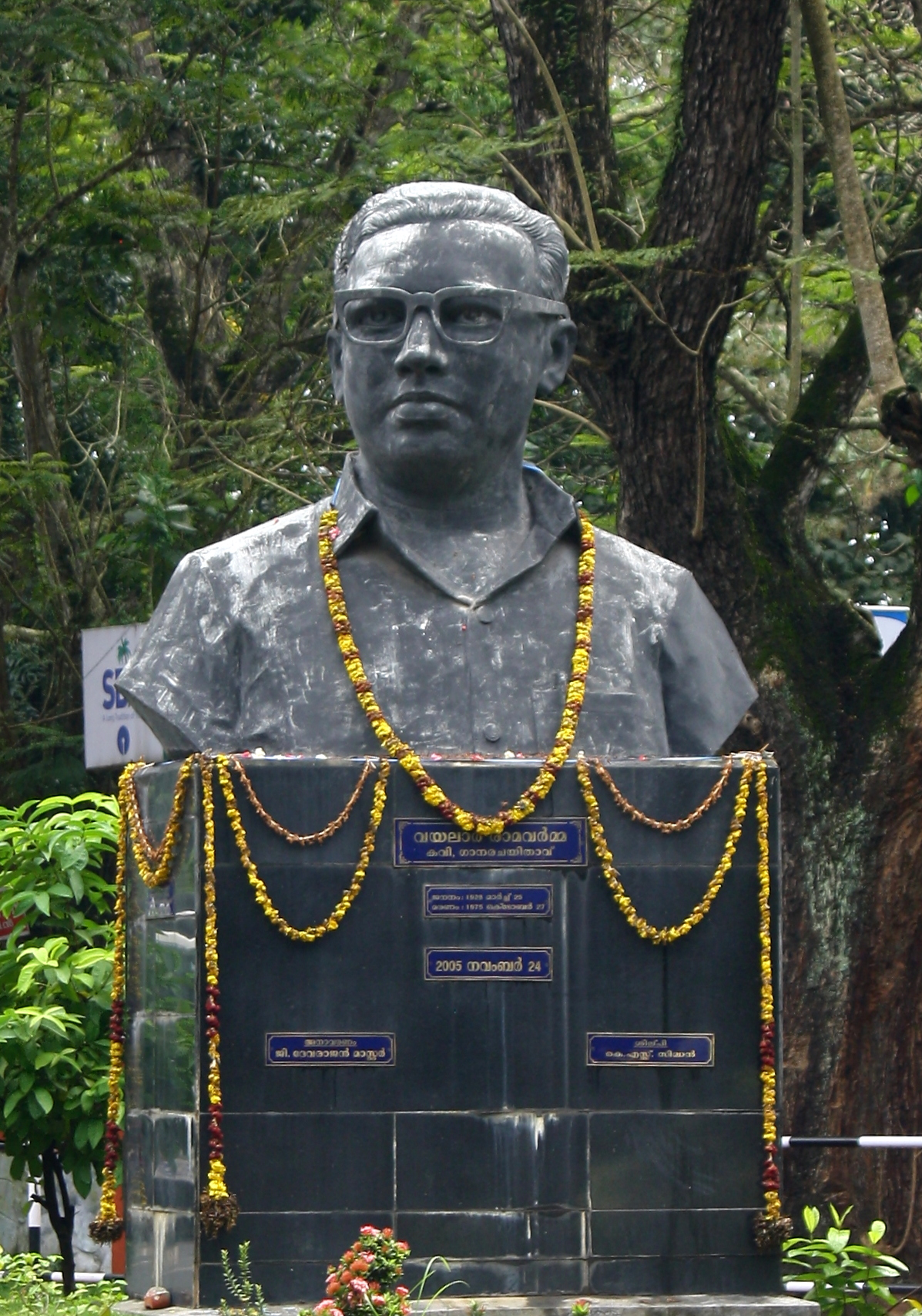
Bust of Vayalar Ramavarma in Manaveeyam Veedhi, Thiruvananthapuram.

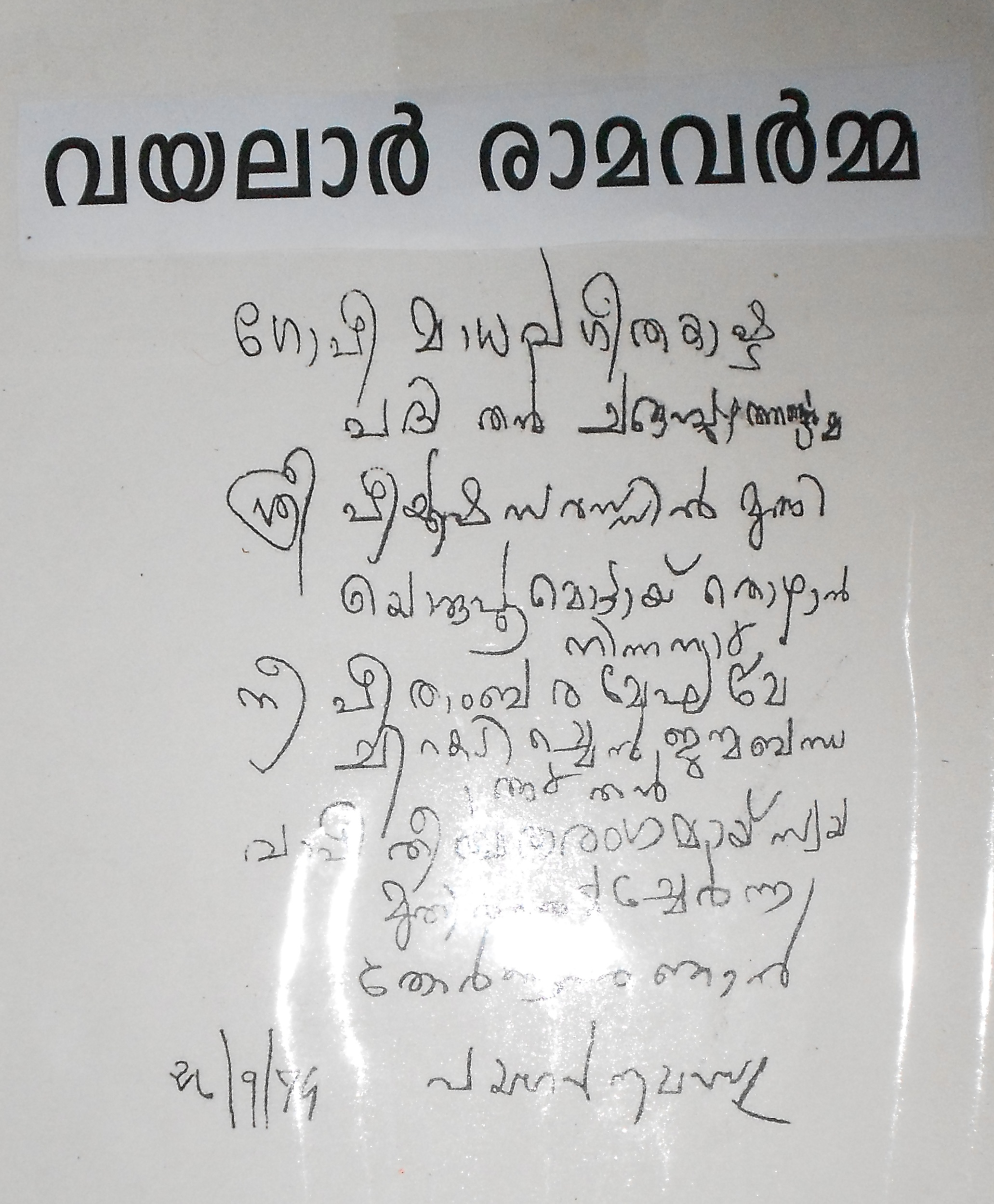
Vayalar handwriting

Ramavarma was born on 25 March 1928, at Vayalar, a small village in Alappuzha district of the south Indian state of Kerala to Vellarappilli Kerala Varma and Raghavaparambil Ambalika Thamburatti. He lost his father at an early age and his education in the traditional gurukula way, was supervised by his uncle, which was followed by formal education at the Sanskrit School as well as Cherthala English School. He started writing poetry while in school, publishing the first poem in "Swarat" magazine, which he continued after discontinuing education after 9th standard and published poems in periodicals such as "Arunodayam" and "Chakravalam". He started a weekly in 1951, under the name, Janadhipathyam, but the weekly, which published articles promoting communist ideals, did not last long. Subsequently, he served as the editor of a publication from Madras.

Ramavarma married Puthekovilakathu Chandramathi Thamburatti in 1951; the couple did not have children. In 1957, he married Bharathi Thamburatti, the younger sister of Chandramathi Thamburatti, and the couple had a son, Vayalar Sarath Chandra Varma, a noted poet and lyricist, and three daughters, Indulekha, Yamuna and Sindhu. He died on 27 October 1975, at the age of 47, following a surgery at the Government Medical College, Thiruvananthapuram where he had been admitted for the treatment of cirrhosis. Later revelations by poet, Ezhacherry Ramachandran, that the actual cause of death was medical negligence, created a controversy, but Ramachandran later refused to stand by his earlier statement. The memoirs of his wife, Bharathi Thamburatti, titled Indradanussinte Theerathu, also became controversial due to certain remarks made in the book about K. J. Yesudas.

== Legacy ==
=== As a poet ===
Ramavarma's first poetry anthology was Padamudrakal, in 1948 which reflected his affinity towards Gandhian ideals in those days. Later he changed his thought towards communism and keep close contact with the communist party of India. There are notable literature works against cast and communal systems in Kerala even though he is from an upper caste family. But he had a good affinity towards Indian culture which is reflected in the poem Sargga Sangeetham. Between 1950 and 1961, he published a number of anthologies including Konthayum Poonoolum (1950), Naadinte Nadam, Enikku Maramamilla, Mulankadu (1955), Oru Judas Janikkunnu (1955), Ente Mattolikavithakal (1957), and Sargasangeetham (1961), a khandakavyam titled Ayisha, two short story anthologies, Raktham Kalarnna Mannu and Vettum Thiruthum as well as a travelogue by name, Purushantharangaliloode, which detailed his experiences during his first trip to Delhi in 1956 to participate in the Asian Writers' Conference. With the popularity of his poems, he was known to have brought poetry to the common man's domain.

=== As a poet and inspirer ===
Ramavarma shifted his base to Madras to take up the editorship of a magazine and this move to the city helped him to get associated with Malayalam film industry which was based there during those days. In 1956, he got the opportunity to write the lyrics for Koodappirappu, a J. D. Thottan film, for which 10 songs composed by K. Raghavan were written by him. Overall, he wrote over 1300 songs for 245 Malayalam movies, 135 songs for 29 music albums and for several plays, of which 755 songs were composed by G. Devarajan. One among the three major lyricists of his times, P. Bhaskaran and O. N. V. Kurup completing the trio, Rama Varma's lyrics were known to have brought the Malayalam film songs closer to poetry.

== Awards and honours ==
Ramavarma received the Kerala Sahitya Akademi Award for Poetry in 1962 for his poetry anthology, Sargasangeetham. Kerala State Chalachitra Academy selected his songs for the films, Nadhi and Kadalpalam for the inaugural Kerala State Film Award for Best Lyricist in 1969; he would receive the award three more times, in 1972 for Chemparathy, in 1974 for Nellu and Athidhi and in 1975 for Chuvanna Sandhyakal and Swami Ayyappan. In between, he received the National Film Award for Best Lyrics for the song, Manushyan mathangale srushtichu in the film, Achanum Bappayum in 1972.

An annual literary award, Vayalar Award, has been instituted in his memory by Vayalar Rama Varma Memorial Trust. The award is given on 27 October, the poet's death anniversary and the recipients include Lalithambika Antharjanam, Thakazhi Sivasankara Pillai, Sugathakumari, M. T. Vasudevan Nair, Ayyappa Paniker and K. Satchidanandan. The trust has constructed a memorial for Ramavarma at his residence in Vayalar, which houses a literary museum, library, office, auditorium, martyr square and conference room. Vayalar Ramavarma Samskarika Vedi, another Thiruvananthapuram-based eponymous organization, has instituted an annual award, Vayalar Ramavarma award, to recognize excellence in television programmes. The organization has instituted two more awards, Vayalar Ramavarma Sangeetha Puraskaram and Vayalar Ramavarma Natya Ratna Puraskaram, music and dance awards respectively, in honour of the poet. The Government of Kerala installed a bust of Rama Varma at Manaveeyam Veedhi, the road between Althara junction to the Museum-Vellayambalam road in Thiruvananthapuram, on 24 November 2005.

== Selected bibliography ==
=== Khandakavyam ===
- Ramavarma, Vayalar (2008). Ayisha. Kottayam: Sahithya Pravarthaka Sahakarana Sangam.

=== Song collections ===
- Ente Chalachitragaanangal in 6 parts

=== Poetry anthology ===
- Vayalar Ramavarmma (1948). "Padamudrakal". Narasimhavilasam.
- Ramavarma, Vayalar (1950). Konthayum poonoolum. Thrissur: Current Books.
- Vayalar Ramavarmma (1955). Enikku maranamilla. Current books, Thrissur: Current Books.
- Ramavarma, Vayalar (1955). Mulankaadu. Kottayam, SPCS.
- Ramavarma, Vayalar (1955). Oru Judas Janikkunnu (in Malayalam). Thrissur, Current Books.
- Rama Varma Vayalar (1957). Ente Maattoli Kavithakal.
- Rama Varma Vayalar (1961). Sarga sangeetham. Kottayam: Sahitya Pravarthaka Sahakarana Sangam.

=== Short story anthology ===
- Vayalar Ramavarmma (1956). Raktham Kalarnna Mannu. Jayasree: Jayasree.
- Ramavarma, Vayalar (1987). Vettum thiruthum. Thiruvananthapuram, Prabhath.

=== Essay compilations ===
- Vayalar Ramavarmma (1965). Purushandarangalilude. Current books: Current Books.
- Ramavarma, Vayalar (1985). Kuppichillukalum rosadalangalum. Kottayam: National Book Stall.

=== Collected works ===
- Rama Varma Vayalar (1976). Vayalar krithikal: kavithakalum gaanagalum. Kottayam: S.P.C.S.
- Rama Varma Vayalar (1984). Vayalar Kavithakal. Kottayam: S.P.C.S.

== See also ==
- List of Malayalam-language authors by category
- List of Malayalam-language authors
