= P. B. Sreenivas =

Indian singer, musician, poet (1930–2013)

Background information
- Also known as: PBS
- Born: Prathivadhi Bhayankara Sreenivas; 22 September 1930; Kakinada, Madras Presidency, British Raj (now in Andhra Pradesh, India)
- Died: 14 April 2013 (aged 82) Chennai, Tamil Nadu, India
- Genres: Playback singing, Carnatic music, ghazal
- Occupation: Playback singer
- Instrument: Harmonium
- Years active: 1951-2013

Prathivadhi Bhayankara Sreenivas (22 September 1930 – 14 April 2013) widely known as P. B. Sreenivas, was an Indian playback singer, composer, harmonium player, lyricist and poet known for his works in various Indian languages. The major chunk of his work has been in Kannada, Tamil and Telugu languages, though he sang many songs in Malayalam and Hindi too. He was the recipient of the Kannada Rajyotsava Prashasti, the Tamil Kalaimamani Award, and the Madhavapeddi Satyam Award by the Andhra Siva Foundation, for his contributions to music and cinema.

In his honour, Sri Kala Sudha Telugu Association of Chennai, instituted the P. B. Sreenivas Mahapurusha Award to honour veteran singers.

== Early life ==
Prathivadhi Bhayankara Sreenivas was born into a Telugu-speaking Brahmin musical family to Prathivadhi Bhayankara Phanindraswamy and Seshagiriamma as their younger son in Kakinada, Madras Presidency, British Raj (now in Kakinada district, Andhra Pradesh, India). His father was a civil servant and his mother a musician. His father wanted him to become a government officer and Sreenivas received a Bachelor of Commerce degree and then passed the Hindi Visharad from the Dakshina Bharat Hindi Prachar Sabha.

== Musical career ==
His uncle, Kidambi Krishnaswamy, was a drama artist and a singer. When Sreenivas was 12, Krishnaswamy gave him a chance to sing in a drama. Later, Sreenivas, a trained harmonium player and singer, went to Gemini Studios, Madras. Emani Sankara Sastry, a veena player, was one of the residing musicians. He introduced Sreenivas to S. S. Vasan, the owner of Gemini Studios. There, Sreenivas sang a super hit song sung by Mohammed Rafi, his favourite singer. It was "Huye Hum Jinke Liye Barbad", from Deedar (1951), composed by Naushad Ali, which landed him the opportunity to become professional playback singer.

== Voice of Dr. Rajkumar ==
PBS has sung at least 300 super hit numbers for Rajkumar. The actor once described Sreenivas as his Shàreera (voice in Kannada) while he himself was a mere Sharira (body in Kannada), summing up how some of the best-known films of the actor are unimaginable without Sreenivas lending his voice.

Until 1974, Sreenivas was Rajkumar's most frequent singing voice in films. However, once when Sreenivas was not available to sing for the movie Sampattige Sawaal, Composer G K Venkatesh encouraged Rajkumar to sing the song Yaare Koogadali that was supposed to be sung by Sreenivas. With that song, Rajkumar restarted his singing career, which had stopped after the movie Ohileshwara. Thus began his journey as the most famous actor-singer that Kannada film industry has ever seen.

== Biography on PBS ==
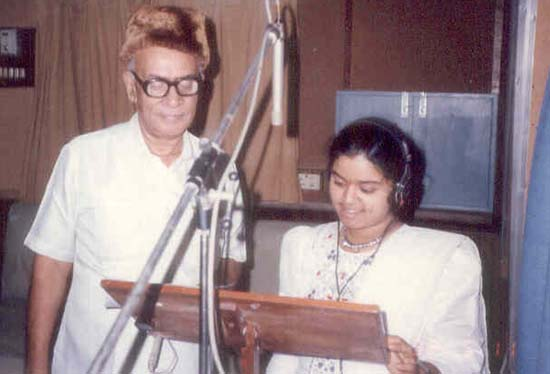
Srinivas, recording in studio with singer Sangeetha Katti

The Kannada biography titled Madhurya Saarvabhowma Dr. P. B. Srinivas-Naadayogiya Sunaadayaana (penned by R. Srinath, Publishers: Surabhi Prakashana, Bengaluru) was released on 7 May 2013 at the Palace Grounds, Bangalore by the singers S. P. Balasubrahmanyam, Vani Jairam and K. J. Yesudas.

== Awards ==
- The second highest award of Karnataka State, the Kannada Rajyothsava Award awarded by the chief minister of the state
- The Tamil Nadu state's honorary Kalaimamani Award
- Dr. Rajkumar Souhardha award given by the super star's family
- The prestigious Karnataka Nadoja Award - constituted by Kannada University, Hampi, Karnataka awarded by the governor of Karnataka
- Tamil Nadu State Film Honorary Award - Kalaivanar Award in 2002

== Filmography ==
Year	Title	Language	Song	Music Director	Co-Singer
1952	Mr. Sampat	Hindi	Aji Hum Bharat Ke	B. S. Kalla and Emani Sankara Sastry	Geeta Dutt
1952	Mr. Sampat	Hindi	Jagah Nahi	B. S. Kalla and Emani Sankara Sastry	Geeta Dutt
1952	Mr. Sampat	Hindi	Lo Bar Jipsi	B. S. Kalla and Emani Sankara Sastry	Shamshad Begum
1952	Mr. Sampat	Hindi	Din Control Ke	B. S. Kalla and Emani Sankara Sastry	Geeta Dutt and Jikki
1953	Jatagam	Tamil	Sindhanai En Selvam	R. Govardhanam	
1953	Jatagam	Tamil	Mooda Nambikkaiyaale Pala Kaedu Vilaiyum	R. Govardhanam	
1953	Jathaka Phala	Kannada	Chintisadiru Ramani	R. Govardhanam	
1953	Jathaka Phala	Kannada	Ee Moodhathanavidheke	R. Govardhanam	
1953	Jathakaphalam	Telugu	Chintisadiru Ramani	R. Govardhanam	
1953	Jathakaphalam	Telugu	Ee Moodhathanavidheke	R. Govardhanam	
1954	Viduthalai	Tamil	Anbodu Inbamagaa Vaazhalaam	Letchumanan Kurunath	
1955	C.I.D.	Malayalam	Kaimuthal Vediyaathe	Br Lakshmanan	
1955	C.I.D.	Malayalam	Nillu Nillu	Br Lakshmanan	
1955	Harishchandra	Malayalam	Mahal Thyaagame	Br Lakshmanan	
1956	Bhale Ramudu	Telugu	Gopaladeva Kaapada Raava	S. Rajeswara Rao	P. Leela
1956	Bhale Ramudu	Telugu	Bangaru Bomma	S. Rajeswara Rao	Jikki
1956	Bhale Ramudu	Telugu	Bhayamela O Manasa	S. Rajeswara Rao	
1956	Nalla Veedu	Tamil	Kalaimathiye En Kaadhal	Krishnamurthi & Nagaraja Iyer	R. Balasaraswathi Devi
1956	Ohileshwara	Kannada	Naa Paapavedena Maadidenu	G. K. Venkatesh	
1956	Pasavalai	Tamil	Malarodu Vishanaagam.... Needhi Idhuthaanaa	Viswanathan–Ramamoorthy	
1956	Penki Pellam	Telugu	Ledoyee Ledoyee Vere Haayi	Pendyala Nageswara Rao	P. Susheela
1956	Prema Pasam	Tamil	Anaitthaalum Neeye Aditthaalum Neeye	S. Rajeswara Rao	P. Leela
1956	Prema Pasam	Tamil	Avan Allaaal Puvi Mele	S. Rajeswara Rao	
1957	Allauddin Adhbhuta Deepam	Telugu	Sogasari Dananayya Rangeli Singari	S. Rajeswara Rao & S. Hanumantha Rao	K. Rani
1957	Bhaktha Markandeya	Tamil	Anbin Uruve Neeye	Viswanathan–Ramamoorthy	Soolamangalam Rajalakshmi
1957	Bhale Ammayilu	Telugu	Cheetiki Maatiki	S. Rajeswara Rao & S. Hanumantha Rao	Jikki
1957	Bhale Ammayilu	Telugu	Bombay Guddalu	S. Rajeswara Rao & S. Hanumantha Rao	
1957	Karpukkarasi	Tamil	Kaniyo Paago Karkando	G. Ramanathan	M. L. Vasanthakumari
1957	M.L.A.	Tamil	Kaaman Kandu Mogam	Pendyala Nageswara Rao	Jikki
1957	Magathala Nattu Mary	Tamil	Kannukku Naere Minnidum Thaarai	R. Parthasarathy	S. Janaki
1957	Makkalai Petra Magarasi	Tamil	Ondru Serndha Anbu Maarumaa	K. V. Mahadevan	Udutha Sarojini
1957	Minnunnathellam Ponnalla	Malayalam	Kannum En Kannumaay	S. N. Ranganathan	P. Leela
1957	Samaya Sanjeevi	Tamil	Gama Gamavena Narumanam Veesudhe	G. Ramanathan	Jikki
1957	Sati Savitri	Telugu	Enduko Ohoho Vilasala	S. V. Venkatraman	S. Varalakshmi
1957	Sati Savitri	Telugu	Raavelano	S. V. Venkatraman	S. Varalakshmi
1957	Sathiyavan Savithri	Tamil	Edhuko Indraanandham	S. Rajeswara Rao & Babu Rao	S. Varalakshmi
1957	Sathiyavan Savithri	Tamil	Raavelano	S. Rajeswara Rao & Babu Rao	S. Varalakshmi
1957	Soubhagyavathi	Tamil	Thatthajam Thatthitthajam	Pendyala Nageswara Rao	
1957	Thaskaraveeran	Malayalam	Malarthorum Mandahaasam	S. M. Subbaiah Naidu	Soolamangalam Rajalakshmi
1957	Veguchukka	Telugu	Thempunnadi	Vedha	Ghantasala, Pithapuram Nageswara Rao & Madhavapeddi Satyam
1958	Anna Thammudu	Telugu	Chinnari Chethula Chirugaali Mrothalaa	G. Aswatthama	K. Rani
1958	Atha Okinti Kodale	Telugu	Rammante Vachaaru Ammaayi Garu	Pendyala Nageswara Rao	Jikki
1958	Badi Pantulu	Telugu	Radhaa Madhava Vinodaleela	T. G. Lingappa	P. Susheela
1958	Badi Pantulu	Telugu	Undaali Sampaadana Jagati	T. G. Lingappa	P. Susheela
1958	Chenchu Lakshmi	Telugu	Kaallaku Gajjelu	S. Rajeswara Rao	Jikki
1958	Illarame Nallaram	Tamil	Marane Un Malarkanai	K. G. Moorthy	P. Susheela & S. Janaki
1958	Inti Guttu	Telugu	Arachethilo	M. S. Prakash	
1958	Karthavarayuni Katha	Telugu	Okkasari Choodava	G. Ramanathan & G. Aswatthama	
1958	Karthavarayuni Katha	Telugu	Kaavali Kaavali	G. Ramanathan & G. Aswatthama	
1958	Karthavarayuni Katha	Telugu	Ananda Mohana	G. Ramanathan & G. Aswatthama	
1958	Kudumba Gouravam	Tamil	Serum Kaalam Vandhachu	Viswanathan–Ramamoorthy	K. Jamuna Rani & L. R. Eswari
1958	Thirudargal Jakkirathai	Tamil	Azhage Unnai Kandom	K. V. Mahadevan	S. Janaki
1959	Aana Valarthiya Vanampadi	Malayalam	Avaniyil Thaano Njan Akappeduvaano	Br Lakshmanan	K. Jamuna Rani
1959	Aana Valarthiya Vanampadi	Malayalam	Om Kali	Br Lakshmanan	K. Jamuna Rani
1959	Aana Valarthiya Vanampadi	Malayalam	Jodiyulla Kaale	Br Lakshmanan	
1959	Abba Aa Hudugi	Kannada	Hrudaya Deviye Ninna	P. Kalinga Rao	S. Janaki
1959	Abba Aa Hudugi	Kannada	Asheya Gopura Nirmisikondu	P. Kalinga Rao	S. Janaki
1959	Arumai Magal Abirami	Tamil	Thanga Niram Idhazh Sembavalam	V. Dakshinamoorthy	P. Susheela
1959	Aval Yaar	Tamil	Pudhu Azhagai Rasikka Varum	S. Rajeswara Rao	Jikki
1959	Azhagarmalai Kalvan	Tamil	Poonthendrale Vandhiduvaai.. Kanindha kadhal	B. Gopalam	P. Susheela
1959	Daiva Balam	Telugu	Andhaala Oh Chandhamaamaa Raavoyi	G. Aswatthama	S. Janaki
1959	Daiva Balam	Telugu	Ninu Variyinchi	G. Aswatthama	S. Janaki
1959	Daiva Balam	Telugu	Om Namo Bagavate	G. Aswatthama	
1959	Deiva Balam	Tamil	Adichchaa Adi Vayitthile Aditchchidanum	G. Aswatthama	A. L. Raghavan
1959	Deiva Balam	Tamil	Malarodu Vilaiyaadum	G. Aswatthama	S. Janaki
1959	Deiva Balam	Tamil	En Manavaanil Aadum Rani	G. Aswatthama	S. Janaki
1959	Deiva Balam	Tamil	Nilavathu Thavari Pennaai Maari	G. Aswatthama	S. Janaki
1959	Engal Selvi	Tamil	Unnai Nambi Aval Irundhaal	K. V. Mahadevan	
1959	Jayabheri	Telugu	Maadi Saradadevi	Pendyala Nageswara Rao	Ghanrtasala & Raghunath Panigrahi
1959	Kalaivaanan	Tamil	Kalai Saaradhaa Dhevi En Thaaye	Pendyala Nageswara Rao	Ghanrtasala & Raghunath Panigrahi
1959	Kalyanikku Kalyanam	Tamil	Indha Maanilathai Paaraai Magane	G. Ramanathan	P. Susheela
1959	Koodi Vazhnthal Kodi Nanmai	Tamil	Padhumai Thaano, Paayum Pulli	T. Chalapathi Rao	
1959	Koodi Vazhnthal Kodi Nanmai	Tamil	Mathaa Pithaavin Manam Kulira	T. Chalapathi Rao	
1959	Mahishasura Mardini	Kannada	Sree Hari Muraari Chakradhaari	G. K. Venkatesh	
1959	Mahishasura Mardini	Kannada	Sri Hari Narayana Vanamaali	G. K. Venkatesh	
1959	Mala Oru Mangala Vilakku	Tamil	Naan Paada Nee Aadu Kanne	C. N. Pandurangan	
1959	Mala Oru Mangala Vilakku	Tamil	Penn Manam Pole	C. N. Pandurangan	Soolamangalam Rajalakshmi
1959	Minnalppadayaali	Malayalam	Neram Pularnnu	S. N. Ranganathan & P. S. Divakar	Kumareshan
1959	Minnalppadayaali	Malayalam	Poovaname Puthuvame	S. N. Ranganathan & P. S. Divakar	S. Janaki
1959	Minnal Veeran	Tamil	Thaalelo	Vedha	
1959	Naadodikal	Malayalam	Innum Kaanum	V. Dakshinamoorthy	P. Leela
1959	Naan Sollum Ragasiyam	Tamil	Kandene Unnai Kannaale	G. Ramanathan	P. Susheela
1959	Naatukoru Nallaval	Tamil	Needhi Aneedhi Modhum Kalamanro	Master Venu	
1959	Nala Damayanthi	Tamil	Anname Thaen Piraiyaale	B. Gopalam	
1959	Nala Damayanthi	Tamil	Prabho Yae Prabho	B. Gopalam	
1959	Odi Vilaiyaadu Paapa	Tamil	Paattu Mudiyum Munne	V. Krishnamoorthy	
1959	Pandithevan	Tamil	Kal Udaithu Malai Pilandhu	C. N. Pandurangan & Meenakshi Subramanyam	T. V. Rathnam, A. G. Rathnamala, S. V. Ramanan & Gomathi
1959	Penn Kulathin Perumai	Tamil	Arputha Kaatchiyil Aayiram Aayiram	G. Ramanathan	K. Jamuna Rani
1959	President Panchatcharam	Tamil	Indru Netru Vandha Sondhama	G. Ramanathan	K. Jamuna Rani
1959	President Panchatcharam	Tamil	Nadai Nadakam	G. Ramanathan	K. Jamuna Rani
1959	Raja Malaiya Simman	Tamil	Maaligaiyilae Vasikkum	Viswanathan–Ramamoorthy	Seerkazhi Govindarajan & G. K. Venkatesh
1959	Raja Malaiya Simman	Tamil	Azhage Amudhe	Viswanathan–Ramamoorthy	P. Susheela
1959	Raja Malaya Simha	Telugu	Oranna Mosappukaalam	Viswanathan–Ramamoorthy	Pithapuram Nageswara Rao & G. K. Venkatesh
1959	Raja Malaya Simha	Telugu	Aase Virise	Viswanathan–Ramamoorthy	P. Susheela
1959	Sumangali	Tamil	Kaadhal Thandha Jothi	M. Ranga Rao	P. Leela
1959	Veerapandiya Kattabomman	Tamil	Inbam Pongum Vennila	G. Ramanathan	P. Susheela
1959	Veerapandya Kattabrahmana	Telugu	Impu Sompu Vennele	G. Ramanathan	S. Janaki
1959	Yaanai Valartha Vanampadi	Tamil	Avaniyil Thaano Naan Akappeduvaano	Br Lakshmanan	K. Jamuna Rani
1959	Yaanai Valartha Vanampadi	Tamil	Om Kali	Br Lakshmanan	K. Jamuna Rani
1960	Aalukkoru Veedu	Tamil	Anbumanam Kanindhapinne	Viswanathan–Ramamoorthy	P. Susheela
1960	Aasha Sundari	Kannada	Neela Megha Gaaliyol	S. Dakshinamurthi	
1960	Aasha Sundari	Kannada	Shrungara Saare	S. Dakshinamurthi	
1960	Adutha Veettu Penn	Tamil	Sayonara Tokyo	P. Adinarayana Rao	S. Janaki
1960	Adutha Veettu Penn	Tamil	Enakkaga Neeye	P. Adinarayana Rao	P. Susheela
1960	Adutha Veettu Penn	Tamil	Maalayil Malar Solaiyil	P. Adinarayana Rao	
1960	Adutha Veettu Penn	Tamil	Kannale Pesi Pesi Kolladhe	P. Adinarayana Rao	
1960	Adutha Veettu Penn	Tamil	Vaadaatha Pushpame.... Vanithaa Maniye	P. Adinarayana Rao	
1960	Annapurna	Telugu	Manasemito Telisindile	S. Dakshinamurthi	P. Susheela
1960	Annapurna	Telugu	Neevevvaro Chirunavvulato	S. Dakshinamurthi	
1960	Bhakta Kanakadasa	Kannada	Deena Naanu.... Baagilanu Teredu	M. Venkataraju	
1960	Bhakta Kanakadasa	Kannada	Badukidenu Badukidenu	M. Venkataraju	
1960	Bhakta Kanakadasa	Kannada	Kula Kula Kulavendu	M. Venkataraju	
1960	Bhakta Kanakadasa	Kannada	Singara Sheela	M. Venkataraju	S. Janaki
1960	Bhakta Kanakadasa	Kannada	Eethaneega Vasudevanu	M. Venkataraju	
1960	Bhakta Kanakadasa	Kannada	Eesha Ninna Charana	M. Venkataraju	
1960	Bhakta Kanakadasa	Kannada	Enthuge Ninna Deha	M. Venkataraju	
1960	Bhaktha Sabari	Telugu	Emi Raama Kathaa	Pendyala Nageswara Rao	P. Susheela
1960	Bhaktha Sabari	Telugu	Paada Paada Thein	Pendyala Nageswara Rao	
1960	Bhaktha Sabari	Telugu	Raamcharaname	Pendyala Nageswara Rao	
1960	Bhaktha Sabari	Telugu	Ranaiyunnadu	Pendyala Nageswara Rao	
1960	Bhaktha Sabari	Telugu	Emi Raama Kathaa	Pendyala Nageswara Rao	
1960	Chavukkadi Chandrakantha	Tamil	Naanum Neeyum Yaaro Evaro	G. Ramanathan	P. Susheela
1960	Daku Bhupat	Hindi	Naina Jo Naino Se Mile	S L Merchant	P. Susheela
1960	Dashavathara	Kannada	Vaidehi Yenadalo	G. K. Venkatesh	
1960	Devanthakudu	Telugu	Entha Madhura Seemaa	G. Aswatthama	S. Janaki
1960	Devanthakudu	Telugu	Go Go Go Go Gonguraa	G. Aswatthama	S. Janaki
1960	Devanthakudu	Telugu	Nee Evaro Nen Evaro	G. Aswatthama	S. Janaki
1960	Devanthakudu	Telugu	Jagamanthaa Maarinadhe	G. Aswatthama	S. Janaki
1960	Ivan Avanethan	Tamil	Devi Jagan Matha	M. Ranga Rao	P. Leela
1960	Ivan Avanethan	Tamil	Inba Yellai Kaanum Neram	M. Ranga Rao	S. Janaki
1960	Kadavulin Kuzhandhai	Tamil	Chinna Chinna Poove	G. Ramanathan	P. Susheela
1960	Kadavulin Kuzhandhai	Tamil	Kaithozhil Ondrai Katrukkol	G. Ramanathan	
1960	Kadeddulu Ekaram Nela	Telugu	Chalule Naa Gulabi	C. M. Raju	Swarnalatha
1960	Kanakadurga Pooja Mahima	Telugu	Anuraagaseema Manameluthama	Rajan–Nagendra	Jikki
1960	Kanakadurga Pooja Mahima	Telugu	Jaya Jaya Namo Kanakadhurgaa	Rajan–Nagendra	Madhavapeddi Satyam
1960	Maharajan Petra Mainthan	Tamil	Kaniyaadha Inba Malarpondra Anbe	Rajan–Nagendra	Jikki
1960	Maharajan Petra Mainthan	Tamil	Jaya Jaya Namo Kanakadhurgaa	Rajan–Nagendra	Seerkazhi Govindarajan
1960	Mangaikku Maangalyame Pradhaanam	Tamil	Kaadhalil Inbathil Moozhgi	Jeevan	K. Rani
1960	Mangaikku Maangalyame Pradhaanam	Tamil	Idhaya Dheviye Kanne	Jeevan	A. P. Komala
1960	Mannadhi Mannan	Tamil	Neeyo Naano Yaar Nilave	Viswanathan–Ramamoorthy	K. Jamuna Rani & P. Susheela
1960	Naan Kanda Sorgam	Tamil	O Thimi Thimthimikku Thimi Endru	G. Aswatthama	
1960	Naan Kanda Sorgam	Tamil	Nee Yaaro Naan Yaaro	G. Aswatthama	S. Janaki
1960	Nagatthil Zimbo	Tamil	Aasai Machaan Kaatthirukken	Vijaya Bhaskar	K. Jamuna Rani
1960	Paadhai Theriyudhu Paar	Tamil	Thennangkeetru Oonjalile	M. B. Sreenivasan	S. Janaki
1960	Pillalu Thechchina Rajyam	Telugu	Ninu Choochi Choochi Veedichipoduna	T. G. Lingappa	K. Rani
1960	Ponni Thirunaal	Tamil	Veesu Thendrale Veesu	K. V. Mahadevan	P. Susheela
1960	Ponni Thirunaal	Tamil	Kannum Kannum Kadhai Pesi	K. V. Mahadevan	P. Susheela
1960	Ponni Thirunaal	Tamil	Yaen Sirithai Enai Paarthu	K. V. Mahadevan	
1960	Neeli Saali	Malayalam	Vaanile Manideepam	K. Raghavan	
1960	Nithya Kalyanam Paccha Thoranam	Telugu	Asalu Neevu Raanela	Pendyala Nageswara Rao	Jikki
1960	Nithya Kalyanam Paccha Thoranam	Telugu	Nee Madhi Paadenu	Pendyala Nageswara Rao	P. Susheela
1960	Nithya Kalyanam Paccha Thoranam	Telugu	Evariki Vaare	Pendyala Nageswara Rao	
1960	Ranadheera Kanteerava	Kannada	Radha Madhava	G. K. Venkatesh	A. P. Komala
1960	Ranadheera Kanteerava	Kannada	Sangeetha Devatheye	G. K. Venkatesh	
1960	Ranadheera Kanteerava	Kannada	Enidu Rosha	G. K. Venkatesh	
1960	Rani Honnamma	Kannada	Jeevana Hoovina Haasige	Vijaya Bhaskar	A. P. Komala
1960	Rani Honnamma	Kannada	Haarutha Doora Doora	Vijaya Bhaskar	P. Susheela
1960	Rani Honnamma	Kannada	Srikrishnanekinta	Vijaya Bhaskar	S. Janaki
1960	Rani Honnamma	Kannada	Raja Rajeshwariya	Vijaya Bhaskar	
1960	Rani Ratnaprabha	Telugu	Yekkada Daachava Sipayee	S. Rajeswara Rao	P. Susheela
1960	Rani Ratnaprabha	Telugu	Anuraagamu Olike Ee Reyi	S. Rajeswara Rao	P. Susheela
1960	Runanubandham	Telugu	Andhamaina Baava	P. Adinarayana Rao	S. Janaki
1960	Runanubandham	Telugu	Yehe Yehe	P. Adinarayana Rao	P. Susheela
1960	Sahasra Siracheda Apoorva Chinthamani	Telugu	Gutilo Naa Chilaka	K. V. Mahadevan	M. Sathyam
1960	Seetha	Malayalam	Paavana Bharatha	V. Dakshinamoorthy	A. M. Rajah
1960	Seetha	Malayalam	Prajakalundo Prajakalundo	V. Dakshinamoorthy	Jikki, A. M. Rajah & Punitha
1960	Seetha	Malayalam	Lankayil Vaana	V. Dakshinamoorthy	
1960	Seetha	Malayalam	Kaanmu Njan	V. Dakshinamoorthy	
1960	Seetha	Malayalam	Seethe Lokamaathe	V. Dakshinamoorthy	
1960	Shanthi Nivasam	Telugu	Sri Raghuram Jaya Raghuram	Ghantasala	P. Susheela
1960	Thozhan	Tamil	Alai Pola Thendral	G. Ramanathan	P. Susheela
1960	Umma	Malayalam	Thallaanum Kollaanum	M. S. Baburaj	
1960	Umma	Malayalam	Kanneerenthinu Vaanambaadi	M. S. Baburaj	
1960	Uthami Petra Rathinam	Tamil	Thediduthe Vanaminge	T. Chalapathi Rao	
1960	Vidivelli	Tamil	Pannodu Pirandhadu	A. M. Rajah	Jikki
1961	Anbu Magan	Tamil	Kodukka Therindha Maname Unakku	T. Chalapathi Rao	
1961	Arabu Naattu Azhagi	Tamil	Mana Kottai Theernthathanaal	Vijaya Bhaskar	P. Susheela
1961	Arabu Naattu Azhagi	Tamil		Vijaya Bhaskar	P. Susheela
1961	Arappavan	Malayalam	Jaathi MathaJaathi	G. K. Venkatesh & P. S. Divakar	P. Leela & KPAC Sulochana
1961	Arappavan	Malayalam	Mathupidikkum	G. K. Venkatesh & P. S. Divakar	P. Leela
1961	Arappavan	Malayalam	Vaadikkariyunna	G. K. Venkatesh & P. S. Divakar	
1961	Bhakta Jayadeva	Telugu	Radhamano Ramana	S. Rajeswara Rao	
1961	Bikari Ramudu	Telugu	Thambi Thambi	B. Gopalam	
1961	Christmas Rathri	Malayalam	Enthinu Neeyiniyum	Br Lakshmanan	
1961	Durga Mata	Hindi	Jai Jagdishwari Jai Jai Ambe	G. K. Venkatesh	
1961	Iddaru Mitrulu	Telugu	Chakkani Chukka Sarasaku Raave	S. Rajeswara Rao	P. Susheela
1961	Intiki Deepam Illale	Telugu	Neeve Neeve	Viswanathan–Ramamoorthy	P. Susheela
1961	Intiki Deepam Illale	Telugu	Yevariki Vaaru Kapala	Viswanathan–Ramamoorthy	
1961	Jnaanasundari	Malayalam	Kezhaathe Kanmani	V. Dakshinamoorthy	
1961	Kaanal Neer	Tamil	Manamenum Maaligai Meedhu	Master Venu	K. Jamuna Rani
1961	Kandam Becha Kottu	Malayalam	Allaavin Thiruvullam	M. S. Baburaj	
1961	Kantheredu Nodu	Kannada	Hennina Mele	G. K. Venkatesh	S. Janaki
1961	Kantheredu Nodu	Kannada	Bangaradodave	G. K. Venkatesh	
1961	Kantheredu Nodu	Kannada	Bangaradodave Beke	G. K. Venkatesh	
1961	Kantheredu Nodu	Kannada	Hagalu Irulu	G. K. Venkatesh	
1961	Kantheredu Nodu	Kannada	Kallu Sakkare	G. K. Venkatesh	
1961	Kantheredu Nodu	Kannada	Ninagidu Nyayave	G. K. Venkatesh	
1961	Kantheredu Nodu	Kannada	Sharanu Kaveri	G. K. Venkatesh	
1961	Kantheredu Nodu	Kannada	Sigadhanna	G. K. Venkatesh	
1961	Kantheredu Nodu	Kannada	Siriye Karunada	G. K. Venkatesh	
1961	Kappalottiya Thamizhan	Tamil	Kaatru Veliyidai Kannamma	G. Ramanathan	P. Susheela
1961	Kittur Chennamma	Kannada	Sanne Eneno Maadithu Kannu	T. G. Lingappa	S. Janaki
1961	Kittur Chennamma	Kannada	Ahorathri Niladodi	T. G. Lingappa	
1961	Krishna Kuchela	Malayalam	Kanninaal	K. Raghavan	
1961	Krishna Kuchela	Malayalam	Pattiniyaaluyir Vaadi	K. Raghavan	
1961	Krishna Prema	Telugu	Sudhaa Maduramu	Pendyala Nageswara Rao	P. Susheela
1961	Krishna Prema	Telugu	Sarva Sarvamsaha Chakra Sa Radha	Pendyala Nageswara Rao	
1961	Krishna Prema	Telugu	Nadu Thulabara Natakamuna	Pendyala Nageswara Rao	Ghantasala
1961	Manapanthal	Tamil	Paarthu Paarthu Nindrathile	Viswanathan–Ramamoorthy	P. Susheela
1961	Manapanthal	Tamil	Udalukku Uyir Kaaval	Viswanathan–Ramamoorthy	
1961	Marutha Nattu Veeran	Tamil	Kallirukkum.... Enge Selkindaraai	S. V. Venkatraman	
1961	Mera Suhag	Hindi	Kaisa Hamara Anurag Pyara	Arun Raghavan	
1961	Naaga Nandhini	Tamil	Kavi Kuyil Neethana	R. Sudarsanam	K. Jamuna Rani
1961	Paapa Pariharam	Telugu	Lokanike Nava vasantham	Viswanathan–Ramamoorthy	
1961	Pangaaligal	Tamil	Ethanai Naal Kaathirundhen	S. Dakshinamurthi	P. Susheela
1961	Panithirai	Tamil	Orey Kelvi	K. V. Mahadevan	P. Susheela
1961	Panithirai	Tamil	Yedho Manidhan	K. V. Mahadevan	
1961	Pasamalar	Tamil	Yaar Yaar Avar Yaaro	Viswanathan–Ramamoorthy	P. Susheela
1961	Pava Mannippu	Tamil	Kalangalil Aval Vasandham	Viswanathan–Ramamoorthy	
1961	Pendli Pilupu	Telugu	Telusuko O Javaraala	K. Prasada Rao	
1961	Punar Janmam	Tamil	Podhum Sarithaan Mister	T. Chalapathi Rao	Jikki
1961	Punar Janmam	Tamil	Engum Sondhamillai Endha Oorumillai	T. Chalapathi Rao	
1961	Sabaash Mapillai	Tamil	Vellipanathukkum	K. V. Mahadevan	
1961	Santha	Telugu	Kalalalo Kavitha Latha	Pasupuleti Ramesh Naidu	S. Janaki
1961	Santha	Telugu	O Paluvannela Pavurama	Pasupuleti Ramesh Naidu	S. Janaki
1961	Sati Sulochana	Telugu	Aadave Vayaari	T. V. Raju	K. Rani
1961	Seetharama Kalyanam	Malayalam	Deva Deva Parandhaamaa	Ghantasala	
1961	Seetharama Kalyanam	Telugu	Deva Deva Parandhaamaa	Gali Penchala Narasimha Rao	
1961	Seetharama Kalyanam	Telugu	Inupa Kattadaal	Gali Penchala Narasimha Rao	
1961	Seetharama Kalyanam	Telugu	Nandhinavamaaninchi	Gali Penchala Narasimha Rao	
1961	Seetharama Kalyanam	Telugu	Bhoomiki	Gali Penchala Narasimha Rao	
1961	Seetharama Kalyanam	Telugu	Chiru Nagavu	Gali Penchala Narasimha Rao	
1961	Shri Shaila Mahathme	Kannada	Birugaali Beesidaga	T. A. Kalyanam	
1961	Shri Shaila Mahathme	Kannada	Mallikaarjunanu Nelesiha	T. A. Kalyanam	
1961	Thayilla Pillai	Tamil	Padikka Venum Pudhiya Paadam	K. V. Mahadevan	K. Jamuna Rani
1961	Thirudadhe	Tamil	Kannum Kannum Serave	S. M. Subbaiah Naidu	K. Jamuna Rani
1961	Thirudadhe	Tamil	En Aruge Nee Irundhaal	S. M. Subbaiah Naidu	P. Susheela
1961	Usha Parinayam	Telugu	Brathikee Phalambemi Ekakinai Itupai	S. Hanumantha Rao	K. Jamuna Rani
1961	Unniyaarcha	Malayalam	Jayabheri	K. Raghavan	A. M. Rajah
1961	Unniyaarcha	Malayalam	Udavaale Padavaale	K. Raghavan	A. M. Rajah
1961	Unniyaarcha	Malayalam	Om Shuklaambaradharam	K. Raghavan	
1961	Unniyaarcha	Malayalam	Prathikaara Durge	K. Raghavan	
1961	Varalakshmi Vratham	Telugu	Andaalu Chindu Mana Prema	Rajan–Nagendra	Jikki
1961	Veera Kumar	Tamil		Rajan–Nagendra	Jikki
1961	Vijayanagarada Veeraputhra	Kannada	Apaara Keerthi	Viswanathan–Ramamoorthy	
1961	Yar Manamagan	Tamil	Kum Kuma Kuma Romba Vegama	Br Lakshmanan	K. Jamuna Rani
1962	Aadi Perukku	Tamil	Puriyaathu	A. M. Rajah	
1962	Aatma Bandhuvu	Telugu	Dhakkenule Naakku Nee Sogasu	K. V. Mahadevan	K. Jamuna Rani
1962	Annai	Tamil	Azhagiya Midhilai Nagarinile	R. Sudarsanam	P. Susheela
1962	Azhagu Nila	Tamil	Chinna Chinna Rojaa	K. V. Mahadevan	
1962	Bale Pandiya	Tamil	Aadhi Manidhan	Viswanathan–Ramamoorthy	K. Jamuna Rani
1962	Bale Pandiya	Tamil	Athikkaai Kaai Kaai	Viswanathan–Ramamoorthy	T. M. Soundararajan, K. Jamuna Rani & P. Susheela
1962	Bandha Pasam	Tamil	Idhazh Mottu Virindhida	Viswanathan–Ramamoorthy	P. Susheela
1962	Bandha Pasam	Tamil	Kavalaigal Kidaikattum	Viswanathan–Ramamoorthy	T. M. Soundararajan
1962	Bhishma	Telugu	Manasuloni Korika	S. Rajeswara Rao	P. Susheela
1962	Bhishma	Telugu	Bava Karunude	S. Rajeswara Rao	
1962	Bhishma	Telugu	Samaramatanchu	S. Rajeswara Rao	
1962	Bhishma	Telugu	Poru Nashtambu	S. Rajeswara Rao	
1962	Bhishma	Telugu	Nannu Nevvaniga	S. Rajeswara Rao	
1962	Bhishma	Telugu	Chesina Karmaye	S. Rajeswara Rao	
1962	Bhishma	Telugu	Pandavulunu Kunthi	S. Rajeswara Rao	
1962	Dakshayagnam	Tamil	Kaadhale Kanintha Kaadhale	S. Hanumantha Rao	K. Jamuna Rani
1962	Dakshayagnam	Tamil	Idhayam Unai Naadudhe	S. Hanumantha Rao	S. Janaki
1962	Dakshayagnam	Telugu	Jabilli Ohoho Jabilli	S. Hanumantha Rao	K. Jamuna Rani
1962	Dakshayagnam	Telugu	Idhi Chakkani Lokam	S. Hanumantha Rao	S. Janaki
1962	Deivathin Deivam	Tamil	En Aaruyire	G. Ramanathan	S. Janaki
1962	Indira En Selvam	Tamil	Kannipparuvam Aval	H. R. Padmanabha Sasthri & C. N. Pandurangan	Soolamangalam Rajalakshmi
1962	Indira En Selvam	Tamil	Inbam Kondaadum Maalai	H. R. Padmanabha Sasthri & C. N. Pandurangan	K. Rani
1962	Gaali Gopura	Kannada	Anuraagade Nee	T. G. Lingappa	P. Susheela
1962	Gaali Medalu	Telugu	Navaraagalu Paadindi	T. G. Lingappa	P. Susheela
1962	Kannadi Maaligai	Tamil	Naanam Eno Intha Velayile	D. Padman	S. Janaki
1962	Karuneye Kutumbada Kannu	Kannada	Nijavo Sullo	G. K. Venkatesh	S. Janaki
1962	Karuneye Kutumbada Kannu	Kannada	Kanneradoo	G. K. Venkatesh	
1962	Kathiruntha Kangal	Tamil	Kaatru Vandhaal Thalai Saayum	Viswanathan–Ramamoorthy	P. Susheela
1962	Kathiruntha Kangal	Tamil	Valarntha Kalai Marandhu Vittaal	Viswanathan–Ramamoorthy	P. Susheela
1962	Kathiruntha Kangal	Tamil	Kanpadume Pirar Kanpadume	Viswanathan–Ramamoorthy	
1962	Kathiruntha Kangal	Tamil	Thulli Thirintha Penn Ondru	Viswanathan–Ramamoorthy	
1962	Kavitha	Tamil	Parakkum Paravai Neeye	K. V. Mahadevan	K. Jamuna Rani
1962	Khaidi Kannayya	Telugu	Ee Nijam Thelusuko	Rajan–Nagendra	S. Janaki
1962	Kula Gotralu	Telugu	Raave Raave Balaa	S. Rajeswara Rao	K. Jamuna Rani
1962	Mangaiyar Ullam Mangatha Selvam	Tamil	Idhuve Vaazhvil Aanandhame	P. Adinarayana Rao	P. Susheela
1962	Mangaiyar Ullam Mangatha Selvam	Tamil	Yenoh Yenoh En Naalum Illaa Aanandame	P. Adinarayana Rao	P. Susheela & S. Janaki
1962	Naagamalai Azhagi	Tamil	Konji Konji Pesalaam	S. P. Kodandapani & T. A. Mothi	L. R. Eswari
1962	Neeya Naana	Tamil	Ponnum Porulum Parisalla	K. V. Mahadevan	P. Susheela
1962	Nenjil Or Aalayam	Tamil	Ninaipadhellam Nadandhuvittaal	Viswanathan–Ramamoorthy	
1962	Nichaya Thaamboolam	Tamil	Maalai Soodum Mana Naal	Viswanathan–Ramamoorthy	P. Susheela
1962	Paadha Kaanikkai	Tamil	Kadhal Embathu Edhu Varai	Viswanathan–Ramamoorthy	J. P. Chandrababu, P. Susheela & L. R. Eswari
1962	Paadha Kaanikkai	Tamil	Poojaikku Vantha Malare Vaa	Viswanathan–Ramamoorthy	S. Janaki
1962	Paasam	Tamil	Maalaiyum Iravum Sandhikkum	Viswanathan–Ramamoorthy	S. Janaki
1962	Paasam	Tamil	Pal Vannam Paruvam Kandu	Viswanathan–Ramamoorthy	P. Susheela
1962	Padithaal Mattum Podhuma	Tamil	Kaalam Seidha Komalithanatthil	Viswanathan–Ramamoorthy	A. L. Raghavan & G. K. Venkatesh
1962	Padithaal Mattum Podhuma	Tamil	Nallavan Enakku Naane	Viswanathan–Ramamoorthy	T. M. Soundararajan
1962	Padithaal Mattum Podhuma	Tamil	Pon Ondru Kanden	Viswanathan–Ramamoorthy	T. M. Soundararajan
1962	Palattu Koman	Malayalam	Ooruka Padavaal	M. S. Baburaj	
1962	Policekaran Magal	Tamil	Nilavukku Emmel Ennadi Kobam	Viswanathan–Ramamoorthy	
1962	Policekaran Magal	Tamil	Indha Mandrathil Odi Varum	Viswanathan–Ramamoorthy	S. Janaki
1962	Policekaran Magal	Tamil	Indha Mandrathil Odi Varum (Pathos)	Viswanathan–Ramamoorthy	S. Janaki
1962	Policekaran Magal	Tamil	Ponn Embean Siru Poo	Viswanathan–Ramamoorthy	S. Janaki
1962	Policekaran Magal	Tamil	Aandrondru Ponaal	Viswanathan–Ramamoorthy	S. Janaki
1962	Prajasakthi	Telugu	Lokamunele Raajakumaari	Viswanathan–Ramamoorthy	P. Susheela
1962	Raktha Sambandham	Telugu	Yevaro Nanu Kavvinchi	Ghanrtasala	P. Susheela
1962	Rathna Manjari	Kannada	Neerahotha Neere Jaane	T. G. Lingappa	S. Janaki
1962	Rathna Manjari	Kannada	Badukidenu	T. G. Lingappa	
1962	Rathna Manjari	Kannada	Deenanaanu Baagilanu	T. G. Lingappa	
1962	Rathna Manjari	Kannada	Kula Kula Kulavendu	T. G. Lingappa	
1962	Rathna Manjari	Kannada	Jayahe Jeevanadodeya	T. G. Lingappa	
1962	Saradha	Tamil	Oruthi Oruvanai	K. V. Mahadevan	P. Susheela
1962	Sengamala Theevu	Tamil	Malarai Parithaai Thalaiyil Vaithaai	K. V. Mahadevan	L. R. Eswari
1962	Sengamala Theevu	Tamil	Ennai Paarthaa Parihaasam	K. V. Mahadevan	
1962	Shantinivas	Malayalam	Sree Raghuram	Ghanrtasala	P. Leela
1962	Shantinivas	Malayalam	Devi Radhe	Ghanrtasala	Jikki
1962	Siri Sampadalu	Telugu	Kondammo	Master Venu	Swarnalatha
1962	Snehadeepam	Malayalam	Moodayaam Sahodari	M. B. Sreenivasan	
1962	Sreerama Pattabhishekam	Malayalam	Ninne Piriyukil	Br Lakshmanan	
1962	Sreerama Pattabhishekam	Malayalam	Pokunnitha	Br Lakshmanan	
1962	Sreerama Pattabhishekam	Malayalam	Thaathan Nee Mathavu	Br Lakshmanan	
1962	Sumaithaangi	Tamil	Manithan Embavan	Viswanathan–Ramamoorthy	
1962	Sumaithaangi	Tamil	Mayakkammaa Kalakkamaa	Viswanathan–Ramamoorthy	
1962	Sumaithaangi	Tamil	Puriyadhu	Viswanathan–Ramamoorthy	
1962	Sumaithaangi	Tamil	Endhan Paruvathin Kelvikku	Viswanathan–Ramamoorthy	S. Janaki
1962	Sumaithaangi	Tamil	O Mambazhathu Vandu	Viswanathan–Ramamoorthy	S. Janaki
1962	Swarna Gowri	Kannada	Baara Chanramaa	T. G. Lingappa	S. Janaki
1962	Swarna Gowri	Kannada	Beeso Gaali Ale	T. G. Lingappa	S. Janaki
1962	Swarna Gowri	Kannada	Nudimana Shivaguna	T. G. Lingappa	P. Susheela
1962	Swarna Gowri	Kannada	Bare Nee Eheluve	T. G. Lingappa	
1962	Swargarajyam	Malayalam	Aadu Sakhi	M. B. Sreenivasan	
1962	Thayi Karulu	Kannada	Baa Thaaye Bharathiye	G. K. Venkatesh	
1962	Thendral Veesum	Tamil	Azhagaana Malare Arivaana Porule	Viswanathan–Ramamoorthy	
1962	Veerathirumagan	Tamil	Paadatha Paattellam	Viswanathan–Ramamoorthy	S. Janaki
1962	Veerathirumagan	Tamil	Roja Malarae Raajakumaari	Viswanathan–Ramamoorthy	P. Susheela
1962	Vidhi Thanna Vilakku	Malayalam	Chandanakkinnam	V. Dakshinamoorthy	P. Leela
1962	Vidhi Thanna Vilakku	Malayalam	Karakku Kampani	V. Dakshinamoorthy	
1962	Vidhi Vilasa	Kannada	Daari Kaanene Nova Thaalalaarene	T. Padman	S. Janaki
1962	Vidhi Vilasa	Kannada	Aananda Saamrajyada	T. Padman	S. Janaki
1962	Vidhi Vilasa	Kannada	Ariyade Ninnaya Gunagala	T. Padman	
1962	Viyarppinte Vila	Malayalam	Thedithediyalanju Njan	V. Dakshinamoorthy	P. Leela
1962	Viyarppinte Vila	Malayalam	Munnottu Poku Sahaja	V. Dakshinamoorthy	
1963	Chaduvukunna Ammayilu	Telugu	Oho Chakkani Chinnadi	S. Rajeswara Rao	Ashalatha Kulkarni
1963	Constable Koothuru	Telugu	Vennelakela Napai Kopam	R. Govardhanam	
1963	Constable Koothuru	Telugu	Chiguraakula Vooyalalo	R. Govardhanam	P. Susheela
1963	Constable Koothuru	Telugu	Chiguraakula Vooyalalo (Pathos)	R. Govardhanam	P. Susheela
1963	Constable Koothuru	Telugu	Poovu Vale	R. Govardhanam	P. Susheela
1963	Guruvunu Minchina Sishyudu	Telugu	Yededu Janmalanundi	S. P. Kodandapani	P. Susheela
1963	Guruvunu Minchina Sishyudu	Telugu	Vakra Thundaa	S. P. Kodandapani	M. Sathyam & S. Janaki
1963	Guruvunu Minchina Sishyudu	Telugu	Ye Divya Lokaala	S. P. Kodandapani	
1963	Idhayathil Nee	Tamil	Poo Varaiyum Poongkodiye	Viswanathan–Ramamoorthy	
1963	Idhayathil Nee	Tamil	Yaar Sirithaal Enna	Viswanathan–Ramamoorthy	
1963	Idhayathil Nee	Tamil	Odivathu Pol Idai	Viswanathan–Ramamoorthy	P. Susheela
1963	Irugu Porugu	Telugu	Jigi Jigelumani	Master Venu	S. Janaki
1963	Irugu Porugu	Telugu	Sannajaji Chelimi Kori	Master Venu	S. Janaki
1963	Irugu Porugu	Telugu	Nrutya Rupakam	Master Venu	S. Janaki
1963	Kadavulai Kanden	Tamil	Ungal Kaikal Uyarattum	K. V. Mahadevan	J. P. Chandrababu
1963	Kadavulai Kanden	Tamil	Poi Sonnaare, Poi Sonnaare	K. V. Mahadevan	
1963	Kalayum Kaminiyum	Malayalam	Malakale Puzhakale	M. B. Sreenivasan	
1963	Kanyarathna	Kannada	Suvvi Suvvi	G. K. Venkatesh	S. Janaki
1963	Kanyarathna	Kannada	Yelliharo Nalla	G. K. Venkatesh	S. Janaki
1963	Kanyarathna	Kannada	Binkada Singaari	G. K. Venkatesh	
1963	Kattu Roja	Tamil	Entha Oor Endravane	K. V. Mahadevan	
1963	Kulavadhu	Kannada	Hennina Mele	G. K. Venkatesh	S. Janaki
1963	Kulavadhu	Kannada	Hagalu Irulu	G. K. Venkatesh	
1963	Kulavadhu	Kannada	Ninagidu Nyayave	G. K. Venkatesh	
1963	Kulavadhu	Kannada	Sigadhanna	G. K. Venkatesh	
1963	Kulavadhu	Kannada	Olavina Priyalate	G. K. Venkatesh	
1963	Malli Maduve	Kannada	Naguve Naaka Aluve Naraka	G. K. Venkatesh	G. K. Venkatesh
1963	Malli Maduve	Kannada	Olavanthe Geluvanthe	G. K. Venkatesh	P. Susheela
1963	Mana Mecchida Madadi	Kannada	Love Love Andarenu	Vijaya Bhaskar	K. Jamuna Rani
1963	Mana Mecchida Madadi	Kannada	Yesu Nadigala Daati	Vijaya Bhaskar	L. R. Eswari & Latha Raju
1963	Mana Mecchida Madadi	Kannada	Hadona Olavina	Vijaya Bhaskar	P. Susheela
1963	Mana Mecchida Madadi	Kannada	Jai Bharata Jananiya	Vijaya Bhaskar	
1963	Nanda Deepa	Kannada	Naliva Mana	M. Venkataraju	S. Janaki
1963	Nanda Deepa	Kannada	Yaarige Yaaro	M. Venkataraju	
1963	Neengadha Ninaivu	Tamil	Kadhaiyai Kettadhum Maranthuvidu	K. V. Mahadevan	
1963	Nenjam Marappathillai	Tamil	Azhagukkum Malarukkum	Viswanathan–Ramamoorthy	S. Janaki
1963	Nenjam Marappathillai	Tamil	Nenjam Marappathillai	Viswanathan–Ramamoorthy	P. Susheela
1963	Nenjam Marappathillai	Tamil	Nenjam Marappathillai (Pathos)	Viswanathan–Ramamoorthy	P. Susheela
1963	Nenjam Marappathillai	Tamil	Nenjam Marappathillai	Viswanathan–Ramamoorthy	
1963	Ninaipadharku Neramillai	Tamil	Ninaipatharkku Neramillai	K. V. Mahadevan	
1963	Ninaipadharku Neramillai	Tamil	Pazhi Vangum Ninaivu	K. V. Mahadevan	
1963	Ninamaninja Kalpadukal	Malayalam	Padinjaare Maanathulla	M. S. Baburaj	P. Leela
1963	Ninamaninja Kalpadukal	Malayalam	Maamalakalkkapurathu	M. S. Baburaj	
1963	Paar Magaley Paar	Tamil	Aval Parandhu Ponaale	Viswanathan–Ramamoorthy	T. M. Soundararajan
1963	Paar Magaley Paar	Tamil	Ennai Thottu Sendrana	Viswanathan–Ramamoorthy	P. Susheela
1963	Paar Magaley Paar	Tamil	Madhura Nagaril Thamizh Sangam	Viswanathan–Ramamoorthy	P. Susheela
1963	Pempudu Koothuru	Telugu	Kannula Vindav Andaalu	T. G. Lingappa	P. Susheela
1963	Rebecca	Malayalam	Baliyallaa	K. Raghavan	
1963	Rebecca	Malayalam	Iniyoru Jananamundo	K. Raghavan	
1963	Rebecca	Malayalam	Muzhangee Muzhangee	K. Raghavan	
1963	Rebecca	Malayalam	Nithyasahaaya Naadha	K. Raghavan	
1963	Saaku Magalu	Kannada	Onde Ondu Hosa Haadu	T. G. Lingappa	S. Janaki
1963	Santha Thukaram	Kannada	Mareyade Sooryanu	Vijaya Bhaskar	S. Janaki
1963	Santha Thukaram	Kannada	Pativrate Kurudalu	Vijaya Bhaskar	
1963	Santha Thukaram	Kannada	Aadi Bee Jaondene	Vijaya Bhaskar	
1963	Santha Thukaram	Kannada	Entha Karunanidhiyo	Vijaya Bhaskar	
1963	Santha Thukaram	Kannada	Horatesere Namma	Vijaya Bhaskar	
1963	Santha Thukaram	Kannada	Jayathu Jayavitala	Vijaya Bhaskar	
1963	Santha Thukaram	Kannada	Kivivarege Seledamba	Vijaya Bhaskar	
1963	Santha Thukaram	Kannada	Pathivrathe Kurudalu	Vijaya Bhaskar	
1963	Santha Thukaram	Kannada	Pundaleekanigaagi	Vijaya Bhaskar	
1963	Santha Thukaram	Kannada	Sada Kanna Munde	Vijaya Bhaskar	
1963	Sathi Shakthi	Kannada	Ee Vilaasi	T. G. Lingappa	S. Janaki
1963	Sathyabhama	Malayalam	Mannavanaayaalum	V. Dakshinamoorthy	
1963	Savati Koduku	Telugu	Manasara Neevu	Satyam	P. Susheela
1963	Snapaka Yohannan	Malayalam	Thannepol Thannayalkkaarane	Br Lakshmanan	
1963	Sri Ramanjaneya Yuddha	Kannada	Jagadeeshanaaduva	Satyam	
1963	Susheela	Malayalam	Thaskaranalla Njan	V. Dakshinamoorthy	K. P. Udayabhanu & Prabha
1963	Yarukku Sontham	Tamil	Vandukku Thaen Vendum	K. V. Mahadevan	P. Susheela
1964	Aandavan Kattalai	Tamil	Kannirandum Minnaminna	Viswanathan–Ramamoorthy	L. R. Eswari
1964	Aayiram Roobai	Tamil	Parpodi Kalnaar Parpodi	K. V. Mahadevan	P. Susheela
1964	Aayiram Roobai	Tamil	Paarthaalum Paarthen Naan	K. V. Mahadevan	P. Susheela
1964	Aayisha	Malayalam	Yaathrakkaara Povuka	R. K. Shekhar	
1964	Annapoorna	Kannada	Kannadave Thaynudiyu	Rajan–Nagendra	
1964	Annapoorna	Kannada	Hrudaya Veene	Rajan–Nagendra	
1964	Atom Bomb	Malayalam	Romeo Romeo	Br Lakshmanan	P. Leela
1964	Atom Bomb	Malayalam	Azhakil Mikachathethu	Br Lakshmanan	S. Janaki
1964	Bobbili Yuddham	Telugu	Sevalu Cheyyale	S. Rajeswara Rao	S. Janaki
1964	Chandavalliya Thota	Kannada	Balli Hange	T. G. Lingappa	S. Janaki
1964	Chandavalliya Thota	Kannada	Ee Neethi Ee Nyaya	T. G. Lingappa	
1964	Chinnada Gombe	Kannada	Thavare Hookere	T. G. Lingappa	P. Susheela
1964	Chinnada Gombe	Kannada	Honnase Ullavage	T. G. Lingappa	
1964	Devaalayam	Malayalam	Kannilppettathu	V. Dakshinamoorthy	
1964	Dr. Chakravarthy	Telugu	Ontiga Samayam Chikkindhi	S. Rajeswara Rao	S. Janaki
1964	Idhaya Kamalam	Tamil	Thol Kandaen	K. V. Mahadevan	P. Susheela
1964	Idhaya Kamalam	Tamil	Nee Pogum Idamellaam	K. V. Mahadevan	P. Susheela
1964	Kaadhalikka Neramillai	Tamil	Anubavam Pudhumai	Viswanathan–Ramamoorthy	P. Susheela
1964	Kaadhalikka Neramillai	Tamil	Naalaam Naalaam Thirunaalaam	Viswanathan–Ramamoorthy	P. Susheela
1964	Kaadhalikka Neramillai	Tamil	Unga Ponnana Kaigal	Viswanathan–Ramamoorthy	
1964	Kaadhalikka Neramillai	Tamil	Viswanathan Velai Vendum	Viswanathan–Ramamoorthy	
1964	Kalaavati	Kannada	Odandi Bekuendu	G. K. Venkatesh	
1964	Kalai Kovil	Tamil	Naan Unnai Serndha	Viswanathan–Ramamoorthy	P. Susheela
1964	Kalai Kovil	Tamil	Mullil Roja	Viswanathan–Ramamoorthy	L. R. Eswari
1964	Kalanjukittiya Thankam	Malayalam	Bhoomi Kuzhichu	G. Devarajan	
1964	Karnan	Tamil	Aayiram Karangal Neetti	Viswanathan–Ramamoorthy	T. M. Sounderarajan, Seerkazhi Govindarajan & Thiruchi Loganathan
1964	Karnan	Tamil	Ennakoduppaan	Viswanathan–Ramamoorthy	
1964	Kuttikkuppayam	Malayalam	Thottilil Ninnu Thudakkam	M. S. Baburaj	
1964	Main Bhi Ladki Hoon	Hindi	Chanda Se Hoga Wo Pyaara	Chitragupta	Lata Mangeshkar
1964	Manchi Manishi	Telugu	Oho Gulabi Bala	S. Rajeswara Rao & T. Chalapathi Rao	
1964	Maayamani	Tamil	Kala Mangaiyo Kala Mangaiyo	Laxmikant Pyarelal	
1964	Maayamani	Tamil	Ondril Ondru Ullam Ondriya Pin	Laxmikant Pyarelal	P. Susheela
1964	Maayamani	Tamil		Laxmikant Pyarelal	P. Susheela
1964	Mane Aliya	Kannada	Preethiya Hoogala Mudidavale	T. Chalapathi Rao	
1964	Muriyada Mane	Kannada	Mathiheena Naanade	Vijaya Krishnamurthy	
1964	Naandi	Kannada	Sathyakke Endigu Jayavemba	Vijaya Bhaskar	S. Janaki
1964	Naandi	Kannada	Namma Thayi Bharathi	Vijaya Bhaskar	
1964	Naandi	Kannada	Haadonda Haaduve	Vijaya Bhaskar	
1964	Naanum Manithan Thaan	Tamil	Kaatru Varum Kaalamondru	G. K. Venkatesh	S. Janaki
1964	Navajeevana	Kannada	Ide Ide Savi Baladina	Rajan–Nagendra	S. Janaki
1964	Navajeevana	Kannada	Yo Yo Yaam Yaam	Rajan–Nagendra	
1964	Navakoti Narayana	Kannada	Madhukara Vruththi	Shivaprasad	M. Balamuralikrishna & P. Leela
1964	Navakoti Narayana	Kannada	Dasarendare	Shivaprasad	
1964	Pachai Vilakku	Tamil	Kanni Venduma Kavithai Venduma	Viswanathan–Ramamoorthy	L. R. Eswari
1964	Pasamum Nesamum	Tamil	Ellaam Naadaga Medai	Vedha	
1964	Pasamum Nesamum	Tamil	Unnai Paarththadhu Ange	Vedha	
1964	Post Master	Kannada	Indenu Hunnimeyo	Vijaya Bhaskar	S. Janaki
1964	Post Master	Kannada	Kannadadha Kuladevi	Vijaya Bhaskar	
1964	Ramadasu	Telugu	Adigo Bhadradri	G. Ashwathama & Chittor V. Nagaiah	Ghantasala & A. P. Komala
1964	School Master	Malayalam	Niranja Kannukalode	G. Devarajan	
1964	Server Sundaram	Tamil	Poga Poga Theriyum	Viswanathan–Ramamoorthy	P. Susheela
1964	Server Sundaram	Telugu	Poota Pooche Hrudayam	Viswanathan–Ramamoorthy	P. Susheela
1964	Shivagange Mahathme	Kannada	Shiva Gangavara	Raghu	
1964	Teen Dost	Hindi	Hamko Hai Jaan Se Bhi Pyara	T. R. Pappa	Manna Dey
1964	Teen Dost	Hindi	Rasiya Mere Man Basiya	T. R. Pappa	S. Janaki
1964	Thotalo Pilla Kotalo Rani	Telugu	Kanule Kalise Vela	S. P. Kodandapani	S. Janaki
1964	Vazhkai Vazhvatharke	Tamil	Aatthoram Manal Eduthu	Viswanathan–Ramamoorthy	P. Susheela
1964	Vazhkai Vazhvatharke	Tamil	Naan Paadiya Paadalai	Viswanathan–Ramamoorthy	P. Susheela
1964	Vazhkai Vazhvatharke	Tamil	Nenjatthil Iruppadhu	Viswanathan–Ramamoorthy	P. Susheela
1964	Vivaha Bandham	Telugu	Neetilona Ningilona	M. B. Sreenivasan	P. Bhanumathi
1964	Vivaha Bandham	Telugu	Neetilona Ningilona	M. B. Sreenivasan	P. Bhanumathi
1965	Aada Brathuku	Telugu	Aaha Andam Chinde	Viswanathan–Ramamoorthy	P. Susheela
1965	Aada Brathuku	Telugu	Bujji Bujji Papayi	Viswanathan–Ramamoorthy	
1965	Aada Brathuku	Telugu	Kanulu Palakarinchenu	Viswanathan–Ramamoorthy	
1965	Aada Brathuku	Telugu	Thanuvukenni Gayalaina	Viswanathan–Ramamoorthy	
1965	Amarajeevi	Kannada	Halliyoora Hammera	Vijaya Bhaskar	
1965	Anbu Karangal	Tamil	Iravu Mudindhuvidum	R. Sudarsanam	P. Susheela
1965	Bettada Huli	Kannada	Aakashada Lokadi Doora	T. G. Lingappa	S. Janaki
1965	Bettada Huli	Kannada	Aaduthiruva Modagale	T. G. Lingappa	
1965	Chettathi	Malayalam	Veedaayaal Vilakku	M. S. Baburaj	S Janaki
1965	Devata	Telugu	Bhalare Dheeruda	S. P. Kodandapani	S. Janaki
1965	Enga Veetu Penn	Tamil	Aatru Vellam.... Sirippu Paadhi	K. V. Mahadevan	
1965	Gudi Gantalu	Telugu	Neeli Kannula Needala Lona	Ghantasala	P. Susheela
1965	Hello Mister Zamindar	Tamil	Ilamai Koluvirukkum Iyarkai	Viswanathan–Ramamoorthy	
1965	Hello Mister Zamindar	Tamil	Hello Mister Jameendar	Viswanathan–Ramamoorthy	P. Susheela
1965	Hello Mister Zamindar	Tamil	Kaadhal Nilave Kanmani Radha (Pathos)	Viswanathan–Ramamoorthy	
1965	Hello Mister Zamindar	Tamil	Kaadhal Nilave Kanmani Radha	Viswanathan–Ramamoorthy	
1965	Inapraavugal	Malayalam	Karivala Karivalam	V. Dakshinamoorthy	P. Leela
1965	Jwala Dweepa Rahasyam	Telugu	Chukkalanni Chusthunnai	S. P. Kodandapani	P. Susheela
1965	Jwala Dweepa Rahasyam	Telugu	Le Le Letha Vayasugala	S. P. Kodandapani	P. Susheela
1965	Kalyana Mandapam	Tamil	Poothirukkum Vizhiyeduthu	R. Parthasarathy	P. Susheela
1965	Kattuthulasi	Malayalam	Thulasi Thulasi Vili Kelkoo	M. S. Baburaj	
1965	Kavyamela	Malayalam	Swapnangal Swapnangal	V. Dakshinamoorthy	K. J. Yesudas, V. Dakshinamoorthy, P. Leela & M. B. Sreenivasan
1965	Kochumon	Malayalam	Uttavalo	Alleppey Usman	
1965	Mahasathi Anasuya	Kannada	Narayanam Bhajare	S. Hanumantha Rao	
1965	Mahasathi Anasuya	Kannada	Sreedhara Keshava Narayana	S. Hanumantha Rao	
1965	Mahasathi Anasuya	Kannada	Thrimurthkala Roopa	S. Hanumantha Rao	
1965	Mavana Magalu	Kannada	Naane Veene Neene Thanthi	T. Chalapathi Rao	S. Janaki
1965	Miss Leelavathi	Kannada	Bayake Balli	R. Sudarsanam	S. Janaki
1965	Miss Leelavathi	Kannada	Neerinalli Neenu	R. Sudarsanam	S. Janaki
1965	Naga Pooja	Kannada	Madhumaaya Chandrana	T. G. Lingappa	
1965	Nanna Kartavya	Kannada	Nannalli Neenagi	G. K. Venkatesh	S. Janaki
1965	Nanna Kartavya	Kannada	Hadinarara Hareyada	G. K. Venkatesh	
1965	Nee!	Tamil	One Day One Way	M. S. Viswanathan	L. R. Eswari
1965	Nee!	Tamil	Sandhosham Vandhaal	M. S. Viswanathan	P. Susheela
1965	Pathala Mohini	Kannada	Oh Mavana Magale	Rajan–Nagendra	S. Janaki
1965	Pathala Mohini	Kannada	Enidu Yaaridu	Rajan–Nagendra	S. Janaki
1965	Pazhani	Tamil	Aarodum Mannil Engum Neerodum	Viswanathan–Ramamoorthy	T. M. Soundararajan & Seerkazhi Govindarajan
1965	Poojaikku Vandha Malar	Tamil	Maiyendhum Vizhiyaada	Viswanathan–Ramamoorthy	P. Susheela
1965	Porter Kunjali	Malayalam	Odippokum Kaatte	M. S. Baburaj	P. Leela
1965	Porter Kunjali	Malayalam	Pinneyumozhukunnu	M. S. Baburaj	
1965	Porter Kunjali	Malayalam	Poovaniyukilliniyum	M. S. Baburaj	
1965	Preminchi Choodu	Telugu	Meda Meeda Meda Katti	Master Venu	
1965	Preminchi Choodu	Telugu	Mee Andala Chetulu	Master Venu	
1965	Preminchi Choodu	Telugu	Adi Oka Idile	Master Venu	P. Susheela
1965	Preminchi Choodu	Telugu	Vennela Reyi	Master Venu	P. Susheela
1965	Santhi	Tamil	Senthur Murugan	Viswanathan–Ramamoorthy	P. Susheela
1965	Santhi	Tamil	Vaazhnthu Paarkka Vendum	Viswanathan–Ramamoorthy	T. M. Soundararajan
1965	Sarasa B. A.	Tamil	Iravin Madiyil Ulagam Urangum	Vedha	
1965	Sati Sakkubhai	Telugu	Baadale Teeredha	P. Adinarayana Rao	
1965	Shakuntala	Malayalam	Vanadevathamaare	G. Devarajan & K. Raghavan	
1965	Sri Simhachala Kshetra Mahima	Telugu	Raavoyi Raaja Kanaraavoyi	T. V. Raju	S. Janaki
1965	Sri Simhachala Kshetra Mahima	Telugu	Jayahe Mohana Roopa Gaana Kalaapa	T. V. Raju	
1965	Sri Simhachala Kshetra Mahima	Telugu	Raave Viribala Dari Raave Eevela	T. V. Raju	
1965	Sumangali	Telugu	Yevevo Chilipi Talapulu	K. V. Mahadevan	S. Janaki
1965	Thayin Karunai	Tamil	Poonthendral Isaipaada	G. K. Venkatesh	
1965	Thene Manasulu	Telugu	Aey Endukani	K. V. Mahadevan	P. Susheela
1965	Thene Manasulu	Telugu	Purushudu Nenai Puttali	K. V. Mahadevan	P. Susheela
1965	Thiruvilaiyadal	Tamil	Podhigai Malai Uchiyile	K. V. Mahadevan	S. Janaki
1965	Thodu Needa	Telugu	Valapuloni	K. V. Mahadevan	S. Janaki
1965	Thommante Makkal	Malayalam	Nillu Nillu Naanakkudukkakale	M. S. Baburaj	P. Leela, S. Janaki & K. P. Udayabhanu
1965	Thommante Makkal	Malayalam	Kocheekkaarathi	M. S. Baburaj	K. P. Udayabhanu
1965	Vaazhkai Padagu	Tamil	Netru Varai Nee Yaaro	Viswanathan–Ramamoorthy	
1965	Vaazhkai Padagu	Tamil	Chinna Chinna Kannanukku	Viswanathan–Ramamoorthy	
1965	Vaazhkai Padagu	Tamil	Kangale Kangale	Viswanathan–Ramamoorthy	
1965	Vathsalya	Kannada	Shramadi Naav Dudidhu	Vijaya Krishnamurthy	Jikki
1965	Vathsalya	Kannada	Maagida Hannu	Vijaya Krishnamurthy	
1965	Veera Abhimanyu	Tamil	Velum Vizhiyum	K. V. Mahadevan	P. Susheela
1965	Veera Abhimanyu	Tamil	Povom Pudhu Ulagam	K. V. Mahadevan	P. Susheela
1965	Veera Abhimanyu	Tamil	Paarthen, Sirithen	K. V. Mahadevan	P. Susheela
1965	Veera Abhimanyu	Tamil	Neeyum Oru Pennaanaal	K. V. Mahadevan	P. Susheela
1965	Vennira Aadai	Tamil	Chithirame Nilladi	Viswanathan–Ramamoorthy	S. Janaki
1965	Vennira Aadai	Tamil	Oruvan Kadhalan	Viswanathan–Ramamoorthy	P. Susheela
1966	Aame Evaru?	Telugu	Tikkiriki Tikkiriki Tattata	Vedha	L. R. Eswari
1966	Aame Evaru?	Telugu	Neevu Choose Choopulo	Vedha	L. R. Eswari
1966	Adugu Jaadalu	Telugu	Bhayamu Vadelenule	Master Venu	L. R. Eswari
1966	Anarkali	Malayalam	Sapthaswarasudhaa	M. S. Baburaj	M. Balamuralikrishna
1966	Annavin Aasai	Tamil	Paateluthattum Paruvam	K. V. Mahadevan	P. Susheela
1966	Chitthi	Tamil	Sandhippoma Indru Sandhippoma	M. S. Viswanathan	L. R. Eswari
1966	Chitthi	Tamil	Sandhippoma Indru Sandhippoma (Pathos)	M. S. Viswanathan	L. R. Eswari
1966	Dr. Anand	Telugu	Musugu Thiyavoyi	K. V. Mahadevan	
1966	Dudde Doddappa	Kannada	Neenu Nanu	T. G. Lingappa	Renuka
1966	Dudde Doddappa	Kannada	Bhakthi Beku	T. G. Lingappa	
1966	Emme Thammanna	Kannada	Neenaarigadayo Ele Manava	T. G. Lingappa	Bangalore Latha
1966	Emme Thammanna	Kannada	Kanneradu Kareyuthide	T. G. Lingappa	S. Janaki & Bangalore Latha
1966	Emme Thammanna	Kannada	Kolalanoodi Kuniva	T. G. Lingappa	Bangalore Latha
1966	Emme Thammanna	Kannada	Belli Hakki Aguva	T. G. Lingappa	S. Janaki
1966	Jail	Malayalam	Michelangelo.... Charithrathinte Veedhiyil	G. Devarajan	K. J. Yesudas & P. Jayachandran
1966	Kaattumallika	Malayalam	Rande Randunaalu	M. S. Baburaj	L. R. Eswari
1966	Kaattumallika	Malayalam	Avalude Kannukal	M. S. Baburaj	
1966	Kappu Bilupu	Kannada	Ide Roopa	R. Rathna	
1966	Kappu Bilupu	Kannada	Indina Hindu Deshada	R. Rathna	
1966	Katari Veera	Kannada	Haayaada Ee Sangama	Upendra Kumar	S. Janaki
1966	Kusruthykuttan	Malayalam	Punnellu Koythallo	Vijaya Bhaskar	S. Janaki
1966	Kodimalar	Tamil	Mouname Paarvayaal	M. S. Viswanathan	
1966	Kumari Penn	Tamil	Nadandhadhu Ennvendru Neeye Sollu	M. S. Viswanathan	L. R. Eswari
1966	Kumari Penn	Tamil	Jaavera Jaa Intha Gettukku	M. S. Viswanathan	
1966	Leta Manasulu	Telugu	Andaala O Chilaka	M. S. Viswanathan	P. Susheela
1966	Leta Manasulu	Telugu	Andaala O Chilaka (Pathos)	M. S. Viswanathan	P. Susheela
1966	Leta Manasulu	Telugu	Ee Poovulalo	M. S. Viswanathan	P. Susheela
1966	Leta Manasulu	Telugu	Hello Madam Satyabhama	M. S. Viswanathan	Pithapuram Nageswara Rao
1966	Madhu Malathi	Kannada	Priyathame Madhumayi	G. K. Venkatesh	
1966	Madhu Malathi	Kannada	Shodashi Shodashi	G. K. Venkatesh	T. A. Mothi
1966	Manase Mandiram	Telugu	Thalachinade Jariginadaa	M. S. Viswanathan	
1966	Mangalasutram	Telugu	Andala Chinadanini	T. Chalapathi Rao	S. Janaki
1966	Mangalasutram	Telugu	Bhale Bhale Posukolu Bavaiah	T. Chalapathi Rao	S. Janaki
1966	Mangalasutram	Telugu	Edi Chikati Jeevitham	T. Chalapathi Rao	
1966	Mantralaya Mahatme	Kannada	Indu Enage Govinda	Rajan–Nagendra	
1966	Mantralaya Mahatme	Kannada	Kaliyirondu Paatavannu	Rajan–Nagendra	
1966	Mantralaya Mahatme	Kannada	Thungaatheera Viraajam	Rajan–Nagendra	
1966	Mantralaya Mahatme	Kannada	Neenu Baralilla	Rajan–Nagendra	
1966	Monagallaku Monagadu	Telugu	Andhala Bommalaga	Vedha	P. Susheela
1966	Monagallaku Monagadu	Telugu	Vachame Nee Kosam	Vedha	Madhavapeddi Satyam & P. Susheela
1966	Monagallaku Monagadu	Telugu	Ahaha Chudu Andhamu Chudu	Vedha	
1966	Monagallaku Monagadu	Telugu	Yevevo Ashalatho	Vedha	
1966	Motor Sundaram Pillai	Tamil	Kathiruntha Kangale	M. S. Viswanathan	P. Susheela
1966	Palnati Yuddham	Telugu	Teeyani Tolireyi	S. Rajeswara Rao	S. Janaki
1966	Poochakkanni	Malayalam	Kakka Kondu	M. S. Baburaj	B. Vasantha
1966	Poochakkanni	Malayalam	Geethe Hridayasakhi	M. S. Baburaj	
1966	Priyathama	Malayalam	Jeevitham Oru Kochu	Br Lakshmanan	
1966	Ramu	Tamil	Nilave Ennidam	M. S. Viswanathan	P. Susheela
1966	Ramu	Tamil	Pachai Maram Ondru	M. S. Viswanathan	P. Susheela
1966	Rangula Ratnam	Telugu	Manusu Manasu Kalise	S. Rajeswara Rao & B. Gopalam	
1966	Sandhya Raga	Kannada	Deena Naa Bandiruve	G. K. Venkatesh	
1966	Sri Kanyaka Parameshwari Kathe	Kannada	Nintalli Avalu Kulitalli Avalu	Rajan–Nagendra	
1966	Sri Krishna Pandaveeyam	Telugu	Yemitaya Nee Leela Krishna	T. V. Raju	
1966	Thoogudeepa	Kannada	Manave Mandira 1	Vijaya Bhaskar	Rajkumar
1966	Thoogudeepa	Kannada	My Fair Lady	Vijaya Bhaskar	L. R. Eswari
1966	Thoogudeepa	Kannada	Helale Haadale	Vijaya Bhaskar	
1966	Thoogudeepa	Kannada	Manave Mandira 2	Vijaya Bhaskar	
1966	Thoogudeepa	Kannada	Needibanni Praanadaana	Vijaya Bhaskar	
1966	Thoogudeepa	Kannada	Nimma Muddina Kandha	Vijaya Bhaskar	
1966	Thoogudeepa	Kannada	Thoogu Deepavidoo	Vijaya Bhaskar	
1966	Yaar Nee?	Tamil	Tikkiriki Tikkiriki Tattata	Vedha	L. R. Eswari
1967	Anuradha	Kannada	Thooguve Rangana	Rajan–Nagendra	P. Leela
1967	Arakkillam	Malayalam	Ormakale	G. Devarajan	S. Janaki
1967	Balyakalasakhi	Malayalam	Nin Rakthamente	M. S. Baburaj	S. Janaki
1967	Balyakalasakhi	Malayalam	Evideyaanu Thudakkam	M. S. Baburaj	
1967	Balyakalasakhi	Malayalam	Karalil Kanneer Mukil	M. S. Baburaj	
1967	Bangarada Hoovu	Kannada	Do Do Do Basavanna	Rajan–Nagendra	L. R. Eswari
1967	Bangarada Hoovu	Kannada	Oduva Nadi Sagarava	Rajan–Nagendra	P. Susheela
1967	Bangarada Hoovu	Kannada	Aa Mogavu Entha Cheluvu	Rajan–Nagendra	
1967	Beedi Basavanna	Kannada	Love Love Love Andre Prema	T. G. Lingappa	
1967	Belli Moda	Kannada	Belli Modada	Vijaya Bhaskar	
1967	Belli Moda	Kannada	Ideega Nee	Vijaya Bhaskar	P. Susheela
1967	Belli Moda	Kannada	Ide Nanna Uthara	Vijaya Bhaskar	P. Susheela
1967	Belli Moda	Kannada	Odeyithu	Vijaya Bhaskar	
1967	Bhagyamudra	Malayalam	Indranandanavaadiyil	Pukazhenthi	L. R. Eswari
1967	Chakra Theertha	Kannada	Eko Ee Pulaka	T. G. Lingappa	S. Janaki
1967	Chakra Theertha	Kannada	Ninninda Neenendoo Hagalirulu	T. G. Lingappa	S. Janaki
1967	Chakra Theertha	Kannada	Ninna Roopa Kannali	T. G. Lingappa	P. Susheela
1967	Chakra Theertha	Kannada	Vidhiyu Thaleda Kopa	T. G. Lingappa	
1967	Chikkadu Dorakadu	Telugu	Avuraa Veeraadhi	T. V. Raju	Ghantasala
1967	Devara Gedda Manava	Kannada	Chakkal Gulli Ittaadisi	Rajan–Nagendra	
1967	Gange Gowri	Kannada	Neerahotha Neere Jaane	T. G. Lingappa	S. Janaki
1967	Gange Gowri	Kannada	Bhavathi Bhikshandehi	T. G. Lingappa	
1967	Jeevikkan Anuvadikku	Malayalam	Njanjivide Elpikkunnu	Vijaya Bhaskar	S. Janaki
1967	Kasavuthattam	Malayalam	Dhoomarashmithan	G. Devarajan	
1967	Kottayam Kolacase	Malayalam	Ponnambalamettil	B. A. Chidambaranath	
1967	Lagna Pathrike	Kannada	Brahmachari Sharanada	Vijaya Bhaskar	A. L. Raghavan
1967	Lagna Pathrike	Kannada	Seenu Subbu Subbu Seenu	Vijaya Bhaskar	A. L. Raghavan
1967	Lagna Pathrike	Kannada	Gandu Muththina Chendu	Vijaya Bhaskar	L. R. Eswari
1967	Lagna Pathrike	Kannada	Illi Yaru Illa	Vijaya Bhaskar	L. R. Eswari & Latha Raju
1967	Lagna Pathrike	Kannada	Nijavo Sullo	Vijaya Bhaskar	S. Janaki
1967	Lagna Pathrike	Kannada	Kanneradoo	Vijaya Bhaskar	
1967	Manassiddare Marga	Kannada	Ee Jeevana Bevu Bella	M. Ranga Rao	
1967	Muddu Meena	Kannada	O Gelathi Nanna	Upendra Kumar	B. K. Sumithra
1967	Nakkare Ade Swarga	Kannada	Baalondu Baavageethe	M. Ranga Rao	P. Susheela
1967	Nakkare Ade Swarga	Kannada	Baalkondu Bhaava Geethe	M. Ranga Rao	
1967	Nakkare Ade Swarga	Kannada	Nagabeku Nagisabeku	M. Ranga Rao	
1967	Nenjirukkum Varai	Tamil	Nenjirukkum Engalukku	M. S. Viswanathan	T. M. Soundararajan
1967	Onde Balliya Hoogalu	Kannada	Ore Notada	Satyam	B. K. Sumitra
1967	Onde Balliya Hoogalu	Kannada	Riksha Gadi Mister	Satyam	
1967	Ooty Varai Uravu	Tamil	Raja Raja Sri Rajan	M. S. Viswanathan	L. R. Eswari
1967	Ooty Varai Uravu	Tamil	Yaarodum Pesakkoodathu	M. S. Viswanathan	L. R. Eswari
1967	Padavidhara	Kannada	Yarigagi Badukidano	R. Rathna	
1967	Parvathi Kalyana	Kannada	Vanamaali Vaikuntapathe	G. K. Venkatesh	Lata Mangeshkar
1967	Premakkoo Permitte	Kannada	Premisona Baara	Vijaya Bhaskar	S. Janaki
1967	Premakkoo Permitte	Kannada	Premakkoo Permitte	Vijaya Bhaskar	
1967	Premakkoo Permitte	Kannada	Kempu Roja Mogadavale	Vijaya Bhaskar	
1967	Private Master	Telugu	Ekkada Untavo	S. Rajeswara Rao	S. Janaki
1967	Rajadurgada Rahasya	Kannada	Kaanuva Thanaka	G. K. Venkatesh	S. Janaki
1967	Rajadurgada Rahasya	Kannada	Balli Sontatha	G. K. Venkatesh	
1967	Rajadurgada Rahasya	Kannada	Devi Devi	G. K. Venkatesh	
1967	Ramanan	Malayalam	Maanasam Kallukondu	K. Raghavan	
1967	Sakshi	Telugu	Radha Madhavam	K. V. Mahadevan	P. Susheela
1967	Sati Sumathi	Telugu	Hayee Veredhi	P. Adinarayana Rao	S. Janaki
1967	Sheelavathi	Malayalam	Vanee Varavanee	G. Devarajan	K. J. Yesudas
1967	Sri Purandara Dasaru	Kannada	Aparadhi Nanallaa	C. N. Pandurangan	
1967	Sri Purandara Dasaru	Kannada	Sakalagrahabala	C. N. Pandurangan	
1967	Sri Sri Sri Maryada Ramanna	Telugu	Emiyee Vinta Moham	S. P. Kodandapani	P. Susheela, S. P. Balasubrahmanyam & K. Raghuramayya
1967	Vasantha Sena	Telugu	Oha Vasantha Yaamin	S. Rajeswara Rao	
1968	Adda Dari	Kannada	Kudukarella Huccharalla	Rajan–Nagendra	
1968	Adda Dari	Kannada	Ecchara Thangi Ecchara	Rajan–Nagendra	
1968	Amayakudu	Telugu	Anukona	B. Shankar	
1968	Amma	Kannada	Bangaara Vaagali	T. G. Lingappa	S. Janaki
1968	Aparadhini	Malayalam	Devayaani	M. B. Sreenivasan	P. Susheela
1968	Bangalore Mail	Kannada	Kannugale Kamalagalu	Satyam	S. Janaki
1968	Bedi Bandavalu	Kannada	Neera Mele Aleya Ungura	R. Sudarsanam	P. Susheela
1968	Bhagyada Bagilu	Kannada	Naane Rajakumara	Vijaya Bhaskar	
1968	Buthisaaligal	Tamil	Aattukku Vaalai Alanthu	V. Kumar	K. Jamuna Rani, A. L. Raghavan & K. Swarna
1968	Chinnari Puttanna	Kannada	Roopayi Thanodi Banth	T. G. Lingappa	S. Janaki
1968	Chinnari Puttanna	Kannada	Nanalli Neenaga Beku	T. G. Lingappa	
1968	Devi	Tamil	Devi Sri Devi	V. Dakshinamoorthy	
1968	Dhoomakethu	Kannada	Anandha Chenda Thumbhi	T. G. Lingappa	P. Susheela
1968	Dhoomakethu	Kannada	Aaha Aaha Idenu Nade	T. G. Lingappa	
1968	Ethir Neechal	Tamil	Thamarai Kannangal	V. Kumar	P. Susheela
1968	Ezhu Rathrikal	Malayalam	Raathri Raathri	Salil Chowdhary & Shantha P. Nair	K. P. Udayabhanu & J. M. Raju
1968	Galatta Kalyanam	Tamil	Engal Kalyanam	M. S. Viswanathan	T. M. Soundararajan, P. Susheela, L. R. Eswari & C. S. Ganesh
1968	Hannele Chiguridaga	Kannada	Ide Hudugi Ide Bedagi	M. Ranga Rao	P. Susheela
1968	Kodungallooramma	Malayalam	Sthree Hridayam	K. Raghavan	
1968	Kuzhanthaikkaga	Tamil	Raman Enbathu	M. S. Viswanathan	T. M. Soundararajan & Seerkazhi Govindarajan
1968	Manassakshi	Kannada	Alealeyali Vuliyulididhe	G. K. Venkatesh	
1968	Manku Dinne	Kannada	Madhura Madhura Ee	Vijaya Bhaskar	P. Susheela
1968	Manku Dinne	Kannada	Baa Bega Manamohini	Vijaya Bhaskar	S. Janaki
1968	Manku Dinne	Kannada	O Gelathi Nanna	Vijaya Bhaskar	B. K. Sumithra
1968	Mannina Maga	Kannada	Alutghihudhu Maanava	Vijaya Bhaskar	
1968	Mannina Maga	Kannada	Bhagavantha Kaikotta	Vijaya Bhaskar	
1968	Nadamanthrapu Siri	Telugu	Nee Challani Manasu	T. Chalapathi Rao	P. Susheela
1968	Pelliroju	Telugu	Aanaati Chelimi	M. S. Sriram	
1968	Poovum Pottum	Tamil	Un Azhagai Kandu Kondaal	R. Govarthanam	
1968	Ram Aur Rahim	Hindi	Hare Ram Bhaj Re	Pamarthi Ashwatham	
1968	Rowdy Ranganna	Kannada	O Geleya Ramaiah	Vijaya Bhaskar	S. Janaki
1968	Rowdy Ranganna	Kannada	Kanneradu Nanage	Vijaya Bhaskar	S. Janaki
1968	Rowdy Ranganna	Kannada	Aadaddhu Ondu	Vijaya Bhaskar	
1968	Sarvamangala	Kannada	Nannavalu Nannadaya	Satyam	P. Susheela
1968	Sarvamangala	Kannada	Javaraya Bandare	Satyam	
1968	Sarvamangala	Kannada	Kannadave Thaynudiyu	Satyam	
1968	Sarvamangala	Kannada	Paripariya Parimalidhi	Satyam	
1968	Thalli Prema	Telugu	Ledaa Ledaa	R. Sudarsanam	P. Susheela
1968	Thalli Prema	Telugu	Ninna Monna	R. Sudarsanam	P. Susheela
1968	Thalli Prema	Telugu	Talli Ninnu Talanchi	R. Sudarsanam	
1968	Madhu Malathi	Tamil	Solaiyil Kaatru Sonnadhu Netru	M. Ranga Rao	
1968	Veeranjaneya	Telugu	Nava Ragame Saagenule	S. Rajeswara Rao	M. Balamuralikrishna
1968	Veeranjaneya	Telugu	Rama Neenamamu	S. Rajeswara Rao	Ghantasala
1968	Velutha Kathreena	Malayalam	Onnaam Kandathil	G. Devarajan	P. Leela
1968	Vidhi	Malayalam	Amritham Pakarna Raathri	Laxmikant–Pyarelal	K. J. Yesudas & S. Janaki
1969	Anbalippu	Tamil	Gopalan Enge Undo	M. S. Viswanathan	T. M. Soundararajan, P. Susheela, L. R. Eswari & Tharapuram Soundararajan
1969	Anbalippu	Tamil	Madhulam Pazhathukku	M. S. Viswanathan	P. Susheela
1969	Avare En Daivam	Tamil	Azhage Unakku Gunam Irandu	T. R. Pappa	L. R. Eswari
1969	Choori Chikkanna	Kannada	Kele Kele Nanna Kathe Heluve	Satyam	Rathnakar
1969	Choori Chikkanna	Kannada	Karaneri Banda	Satyam	
1969	Choori Chikkanna	Kannada	Mellage Nade Mellage	Satyam	
1969	Gejje Pooje	Kannada	Panchama Vedha Premadha Naadha	Vijaya Bhaskar	
1969	Kannur Deluxe	Malayalam	Kannundaayathu Ninne	V. Dakshinamoorthy	P. Leela
1969	Kannur Deluxe	Malayalam	Ee Muhabathenthoru	V. Dakshinamoorthy	K. J. Yesudas & S. Janaki
1969	Kumara Sambhavam	Malayalam	Padmaasanathil	G. Devarajan	
1969	Maduve Maduve Maduve	Kannada	Alli Poorna Chandrama	Satyam	
1969	Mallammana Pavaada	Kannada	Haadona Olavina	Vijaya Bhaskar	P. Susheela
1969	Mallammana Pavaada	Kannada	Naanoonu Nim Haage	Vijaya Bhaskar	
1969	Mayor Muthanna	Kannada	Onde Naadu	Rajan–Nagendra	S. Janaki
1969	Mayor Muthanna	Kannada	Haavige Mungusiyuntu	Rajan–Nagendra	L. R. Eswari & Dwarakish
1969	Mayor Muthanna	Kannada	Halliyadarenu Shiva	Rajan–Nagendra	
1969	Mooga Nomu	Telugu	Voorumaarinaa Unikimaarunaa	R. Govardhanam	
1969	Natakala Rayudu	Telugu	Nalabhai Ki Debbai Ki Theda Enta	G. K. Venkatesh	Ghantasala, P. Susheela & B. Vasantha
1969	Nil Gavani Kadhali	Tamil	Engeyo Paartha Mugam	M. S. Viswanathan	
1969	Punarjanma	Kannada	Godholi Haruva	Satyam	P. Susheela
1969	Punarjanma	Kannada	Kannadathi Nammodathi	Satyam	P. Susheela
1969	Punarjanma	Kannada	Muluga Bayasuve	Satyam	
1969	Punarjanma	Kannada	Olumeya Hoove	Satyam	
1969	Sandhya	Malayalam	Asthamanakkadalinnakale	M. S. Baburaj	
1969	Sandhya	Malayalam	Kaaviyuduppumay	M. S. Baburaj	
1969	Saptaswaralu	Telugu	Hayiga Padana Geetam Jagamulu Pogadaga Jejelu	T. V. Raju	Ghantasala
1969	Saptaswaralu	Telugu	Yakumbendu Tusharahara Dhavala Ya Subhavastra	T. V. Raju	
1969	Tara Sasankam	Telugu	Vande Janani Vande Sudhavahini	T. V. Raju	Ghantasala
1969	Thanga Malar	Tamil	Amaidhu Amaidhi	T. G. Lingappa	P. Susheela
1969	Thanga Malar	Tamil	Aasai Vaitthaal Adhu Mosam	T. G. Lingappa	
1969	Uyyale	Kannada	Kaddu Kaddu Nodo	Vijaya Bhaskar	
1969	Uyyale	Kannada	Nagutha Haadale	Vijaya Bhaskar	
1969	Uyyale	Kannada	Kallu Kavitheya Haaduvudu	Vijaya Bhaskar	
1969	Vilakkapetta Bendhangal	Malayalam	Penninte Kannil	A. T. Ummer	L. R. Eswari
1970	Aa Chithrashalabham Parannotte	Malayalam	Kavithayo Ninte Kannil	G. Devarajan	K. Sivadas
1970	Akhandudu	Telugu	Oyyammo Intha Kopam	T. Chalapathi Rao	P. Susheela
1970	Akhandudu	Telugu	Raa Raa Rammante	T. Chalapathi Rao	P. Susheela
1970	Akhandudu	Telugu	Oh Hamsa Nadaladhana	T. Chalapathi Rao	
1970	Ammayenna Sthree	Malayalam	Thamasso Ma Jyothirgamaya	A. M. Rajah	
1970	Arishina Kumkuma	Kannada	Honnaase Ullavage	Vijaya Bhaskar	
1970	Arishina Kumkuma	Kannada	Thaavare Hoo Kere	Vijaya Bhaskar	P. Susheela
1970	Arishina Kumkuma	Kannada	Ilidu Baa Thaaye	Vijaya Bhaskar	
1970	Baalu Belagithu	Kannada	Cheluvada Muddada	Vijaya Bhaskar	P. Susheela
1970	Baalu Belagithu	Kannada	Kamalada Hoovinda	Vijaya Bhaskar	
1970	Baalu Belagithu	Kannada	Neethivantha Baalale Beku	Vijaya Bhaskar	
1970	Bhale Jodi	Kannada	Manikyadantha Maavayya	R. Rathna	L. R. Eswari
1970	Bhale Jodi	Kannada	Amma Amma	R. Rathna	
1970	Bhale Jodi	Kannada	Nanna Kanasina Raaniye	R. Rathna	
1970	Bhoopathi Ranga	Kannada	Hakkiyu Haaruthide	Vijaya Bhaskar	
1970	Bhoopathi Ranga	Kannada	Oho Muddina Mallige	Vijaya Bhaskar	
1970	Bhoopathi Ranga	Kannada	Hasuvina Veshada	Vijaya Bhaskar	
1970	C.I.D. Rajanna	Kannada	Yaavurappa Ninna Hesarenappa	Satyam	S. Janaki
1970	C.I.D. Rajanna	Kannada	Nannaleno Hosa Baavane	Satyam	P. Susheela & S. P. Balasubrahmanyam
1970	C.I.D. Rajanna	Kannada	Nee Baluki Baluki Nadevaaga	Satyam	
1970	C.I.D. Rajanna	Kannada	Amma Thaaye Amma Thaaye	Satyam	
1970	Devara Makkalu	Kannada	Haadi Hoovu	G. K. Venkatesh	S. Janaki
1970	Devara Makkalu	Kannada	Ee Dina Maja	G. K. Venkatesh	
1970	En Annan	Tamil	Kannukku Theriyadha Andha Sugam	K. V. Mahadevan	L. R. Eswari
1970	Hasiru Thorana	Kannada	Ondu Dina Ellindalo	Upendra Kumar	S. Janaki
1970	Hasiru Thorana	Kannada	Nodu Nodu Mellage	Upendra Kumar	
1970	Hasiru Thorana	Kannada	Seethe Hrudaya Sakhi	Upendra Kumar	
1970	Karulina Kare	Kannada	Mysooru Dasara	M. Ranga Rao	
1970	Karulina Kare	Kannada	Kande Naa Kande	M. Ranga Rao	
1970	Karulina Kare	Kannada	Hodeyuva Kai Ondu	M. Ranga Rao	
1970	Karulina Kare	Kannada	Asathoma Sadgamaya	M. Ranga Rao	
1970	Mr. Rajkumar	Kannada	Gangi Ninmele	S. Rajeswara Rao	S. Janaki
1970	Mr. Rajkumar	Kannada	Balliyondu	S. Rajeswara Rao	
1970	Mr. Rajkumar	Kannada	Kudiyona Ba	S. Rajeswara Rao	
1970	Nanna Thamma	Kannada	Ide Hosa Haadu	Ghantasala	
1970	Paropakari	Kannada	Hodare Hogu Nanagenu	Upendra Kumar	S. Janaki
1970	Paropakari	Kannada	Kannu Reppe Ondhanondhu	Upendra Kumar	S. Janaki
1970	Paropakari	Kannada	Guttondhu Heluve	Upendra Kumar	
1970	Paropakari	Kannada	Ice Cream Beke	Upendra Kumar	
1970	Sambarala Rambabu	Telugu		V. Kumar	P. Susheela
1970	Seetha	Kannada	Ee Cheluvanu	Vijaya Bhaskar	L. R. Anjali
1970	Seetha	Kannada	Barede Neenu Ninna Hesara	Vijaya Bhaskar	
1970	Sri Krishnadevaraya	Kannada	Bahunanmada Poojaphala	T. G. Lingappa	S. Janaki
1970	Sri Krishnadevaraya	Kannada	Kalyanaadbhuta Tirupatigirivasa	T. G. Lingappa	P. Susheela & S. Janaki
1970	Sri Krishnadevaraya	Kannada	Krishnana Hesare Lokapriya	T. G. Lingappa	Soolamangalam Rajalakshmi & S. Janaki
1970	Thriveni	Malayalam	Kezhakku Kezhakkoraana	G. Devarajan	Latha Raju
1971	Baala Bandana	Kannada	Chinnadanta Naadige	G. K. Venkatesh	P. Susheela
1971	Baala Bandana	Kannada	Nijavanne Heluve Naanu	G. K. Venkatesh	
1971	Baala Bandana	Kannada	Baachi Baithale	G. K. Venkatesh	
1971	Bhale Adrushtavo Adrushta	Kannada	Navu Haaduvude	Vijaya Bhaskar	A. L. Raghavan
1971	Bhale Adrushtavo Adrushta	Kannada	Kannadathi O Gelathi	Vijaya Bhaskar	L. R. Eswari
1971	Bhale Adrushtavo Adrushta	Kannada	Ee Maithri Apoorva Maithri	Vijaya Bhaskar	
1971	Bhale Adrushtavo Adrushta	Kannada	Balegaara Chenniaiah	Vijaya Bhaskar	
1971	Bhale Adrushtavo Adrushta	Kannada	Kalpana Roopa Rasi	Vijaya Bhaskar	
1971	Chelleli Kapuram	Telugu	Ee Dhaari Nee Swamy	K. V. Mahadevan	S. Janaki
1971	Jai Jawan Jai Kisan	Hindi	Nakhrewali Chaal		
1971	Jalakanyaka	Malayalam	Ezhu Kadalodi	A. T. Ummer	K. J. Yesudas & P. Jayachandran
1971	Kankaatchi	Tamil	Kaanum Kalaiyellaam Kankaatchi	Kunnakudi Vaidyanathan	M. R. Vijaya
1971	Kasidre Kailasa	Kannada	Gudiyalli Adagiha	Satyam	
1971	Kasidre Kailasa	Kannada	O Makkale Ee Nadina	Satyam	
1971	Kasturi Nivasa	Kannada	Aadisi Nodu Beelisi Nodu	G. K. Venkatesh	
1971	Kasturi Nivasa	Kannada	Aadona Neenu Naanu	G. K. Venkatesh	
1971	Kasturi Nivasa	Kannada	Nee Bandhu Ninthaaga	G. K. Venkatesh	P. Susheela
1971	Kula Gourava	Kannada	Ondu Maathu Ondu Maathu	T. G. Lingappa	P. Susheela
1971	Kula Gourava	Kannada	Ye Hudugi Ye Bedagi	T. G. Lingappa	P. Susheela
1971	Kula Gourava	Kannada	Naa Haadabeke	T. G. Lingappa	
1971	Naguva Hoovu	Kannada	Onde Ondu Hoovu	G. K. Venkatesh	S. Janaki
1971	Namma Samsara	Kannada	Namma Samsara Ananda Sagara	M. Ranga Rao	P. Susheela & S. P. Balasubrahmanyam
1971	Namma Samsara	Kannada	Namma Samsara Ananda Sagara (Pathos)	M. Ranga Rao	P. Susheela
1971	Namma Samsara	Kannada	Hennu Endare	M. Ranga Rao	S. Janaki
1971	Navavadhu	Malayalam	Ammayum Nee	G. Devarajan	
1971	Navavadhu	Malayalam	Priyathama Priyathama	G. Devarajan	
1971	Nyayave Devaru	Kannada	Kunidaaduva Vayasidu	Rajan–Nagendra	
1971	Nyayave Devaru	Kannada	Aakaashave Beelali Mele	Rajan–Nagendra	
1971	Oru Thaai Makkal	Tamil	Paadinal Oru Paattu	M. S. Viswanathan	T. M. Soundararajan
1971	Sakshatkara	Kannada	Januma Janumadha Anubandha	M. Ranga Rao	
1971	Sakshatkara	Kannada	Olave Jeevana Sakshatkara	M. Ranga Rao	P. Susheela
1971	Sampoorna Ramayanam	Telugu	Vedalenu Kodandapani	K. V. Mahadevan	P. Susheela
1971	Samshaya Phala	Kannada	Ideega Nee Doorade	Salil Chowdhury	P. Susheela
1971	Samshaya Phala	Kannada	Prema Virinchiya	Salil Chowdhury	Sabitha Chowdhary
1971	Sharapanjara	Kannada	Kodagina Kaveri	Vijaya Bhaskar	P. Susheela
1971	Sharapanjara	Kannada	Uttara Dhruvadim Dakshina Dhruvaku	Vijaya Bhaskar	P. Susheela
1971	Sri Krishna Rukmini Satyabhama	Kannada	Nodalu Kangalu	R. Sudarsanam	S. Janaki
1971	Sri Krishna Rukmini Satyabhama	Kannada	Parama Sundari Bhama	R. Sudarsanam	
1971	Sri Krishna Rukmini Satyabhama	Kannada	Bhama Satyabhama	R. Sudarsanam	
1971	Sri Krishna Rukmini Satyabhama	Kannada	Aaha Entha Samaya	R. Sudarsanam	
1971	Thayi Devaru	Kannada	Haayagide Ee Dina Mana	G. K. Venkatesh	S. Janaki
1971	Thayi Devaru	Kannada	Onde Marada	G. K. Venkatesh	
1971	Vimochanasamaram	Malayalam	Ee Nalla Nattilellam	M. B. Sreenivasan	
1972	Achanum Bappayum	Malayalam	Oru Matham Oru Jathi	G. Devarajan	P. Madhuri
1972	Bangaarada Manushya	Kannada	Aaha Mysooru Mallige	G. K. Venkatesh	P. Susheela
1972	Bangaarada Manushya	Kannada	Hani Hani Goodidre	G. K. Venkatesh	S. P. Balasubrahmanyam & P. Susheela
1972	Bangaarada Manushya	Kannada	Nagu Naguta Nali	G. K. Venkatesh	
1972	Bangaarada Manushya	Kannada	Aagadu Endu	G. K. Venkatesh	
1972	Bhale Huchcha	Kannada	Yaaru Neenu	Rajan–Nagendra	L. R. Eswari
1972	Bhale Huchcha	Kannada	Ballige Hoovu Chenda	Rajan–Nagendra	S. Janaki
1972	Bhale Huchcha	Kannada	Hey Ene Subbi	Rajan–Nagendra	
1972	Bhale Huchcha	Kannada	Kallade Ekendu Balle	Rajan–Nagendra	
1972	Hrudaya Sangama	Kannada	Nee Thanda Kanike	Vijaya Bhaskar	S. Janaki
1972	Hrudaya Sangama	Kannada	Nade Nade Nade Manave	Vijaya Bhaskar	
1972	Iniyoru Janmam Tharu	Malayalam	Athyunnathangalirikkum	M. B. Sreenivasan	
1972	Jaga Mecchida Maga	Kannada	Idu Yaava Janmada	Satyam	S. Janaki
1972	Jaga Mecchida Maga	Kannada	Olagina Aase Heluva Bashe	Satyam	
1972	Jaga Mecchida Maga	Kannada	Thaa Thai	Satyam	
1972	Janma Rahasya	Kannada	Beeso Gaali Ale	M. Ranga Rao	S. Janaki
1972	Kranti Veera	Kannada	Kaniveya Kelagina	Satyam	P. Susheela
1972	Kranti Veera	Kannada	Harikathe	Satyam	Rajkumar
1972	Kranti Veera	Kannada	Yaaru Enu Maduvaru	Satyam	
1972	Lakshyam	Malayalam	Paapathin Kurishenthi	M. K. Arjunan	
1972	Mareyada Deepavali	Kannada	Jeevanave Sukha Payana	Vijaya Bhaskar	S. Janaki
1972	Naa Mechida Huduga	Kannada	Cheluve Oh Cheluve	Vijaya Bhaskar	A. L. Raghavan
1972	Naa Mechida Huduga	Kannada	Beladingalina Nore Haalu	Vijaya Bhaskar	S. Janaki
1972	Naagarahaavu	Kannada	Kannada Naadina Veera	Vijaya Bhaskar	
1972	Naagarahaavu	Kannada	Baare Baare	Vijaya Bhaskar	
1972	Naagarahaavu	Kannada	Sangama Sangama	Vijaya Bhaskar	P. Susheela
1972	Nanda Gokula	Kannada	Nanjana Goodinda	Vijaya Bhaskar	S. P. Balasubrahmanyam
1972	Nanda Gokula	Kannada	Nee Janisida Dinavu	Vijaya Bhaskar	
1972	Nanda Gokula	Kannada	Ee Dina Januma Dina	Vijaya Bhaskar	
1972	Prathikaram	Malayalam	Suve Wazire Waaliyaan	M. B. Sreenivasan	S. Janaki
1972	Sipayi Ramu	Kannada	Ellige Payana Yaavudo Daari	Upendra Kumar	
1972	Sipayi Ramu	Kannada	Nidireyu Sadaa Eko Doora	Upendra Kumar	P. Susheela
1972	Thavapudhalavan	Tamil	Ulagin Mudalisai	M. S. Viswanathan	T. M. Soundararajan
1973	Bahaadur Ladkiyaan	Hindi	Ye Dil Udas Hai	Satyam	S. P. Balasubrahmanyam & Vani Jairam
1973	Bahaadur Ladkiyaan	Hindi	Kitni Hasin Maat Hai	Satyam	S. P. Balasubrahmanyam & Vani Jairam
1973	Bahaadur Ladkiyaan	Hindi	Ye Dil Ka Khel	Satyam	S. P. Balasubrahmanyam & Vani Jairam
1973	Bahaadur Ladkiyaan	Hindi	Aao Naino Se Khelo	Satyam	S. P. Balasubrahmanyam & Vani Jairam
1973	Bahaadur Ladkiyaan	Hindi	Hare Ram Hare Krishna	Satyam	S. P. Balasubrahmanyam & Vani Jairam
1973	Bidugade	Kannada	Bedagina Henna	M. Ranga Rao	P. Susheela
1973	Bidugade	Kannada	Baanige Neeliya	M. Ranga Rao	P. Susheela
1973	CID 72	Kannada	Heegay Iruva Haayagiruva	Vijaya Bhaskar	P. Susheela
1973	Devaru Kotta Thangi	Kannada	Ee Lokavella	Vijaya Bhaskar	
1973	Doorada Betta	Kannada	Preethine Aa Dhyaavru Thanda	G. K. Venkatesh	P. Susheela
1973	Doorada Betta	Kannada	Kaamanna Kathige	G. K. Venkatesh	T. A. Mothi
1973	Doorada Betta	Kannada	Savaalu Haaki Solisi Ellara	G. K. Venkatesh	Asha Bhosle & T. A. Mothi
1973	Gandhada Gudi	Kannada	Ellu Hogalla	Rajan–Nagendra	S. Janaki
1973	Gandhada Gudi	Kannada	Naavaaduva Nudiye Kannada	Rajan–Nagendra	
1973	Ganga Gowri	Tamil	Andharangam Naan Ariven	M. S. Viswanathan	S. Janaki
1973	Hum Junglee Hain	Hindi	Hathi Ke Daant Le Lo	Vedpal Varma	L. R. Eswari
1973	Kaadu	Malayalam	Veno Veno	Vedpal Verma	L. R. Eswari
1973	Masappady Mathupillai	Malayalam	Zindabaad Zindabaad	G. Devarajan	
1973	Paattondru Ketten	Tamil	Kungumam Pirandhadhu Maratthilaa	C. Ramchandra	P. Susheela
1973	Paattondru Ketten	Tamil	Azhage Uruvai Aval Vandhal	C. Ramchandra	
1973	Prethangalude Thazhvara	Malayalam	Muthu Mehboobe	G. Devarajan	Sathi
1973	Ponnapuram Kotta	Malayalam	Aadiparaashakthi	G. Devarajan	K. J. Yesudas, P. Susheela, P. Madhuri & P. Leela
1973	Sankalpa	Kannada	Sirivanthanaadaru	Vijaya Bhaskar	
1973	Seethe Alla Savithri	Kannada	Devi Aatagaathiyu Neenu	Vijaya Bhaskar	S. Janaki
1973	Seethe Alla Savithri	Kannada	Samaagama Manorama	Vijaya Bhaskar	
1974	Bangaarada Panjara	Kannada	Bittare Sigadone	G. K. Raghu	S. Janaki
1974	Bangaarada Panjara	Kannada	Kariya Kambali	G. K. Raghu	S. Janaki
1974	Bangaarada Panjara	Kannada	Come And Meet Me	G. K. Raghu	S. Janaki
1974	Bangaarada Panjara	Kannada	Suy Anno Gaali	G. K. Raghu	S. Janaki
1974	Bhakta Kumbara	Kannada	Naanu Neenu Nentarayya	G. K. Venkatesh	
1974	Bhakta Kumbara	Kannada	Hari Namave Chanda	G. K. Venkatesh	
1974	Bhakta Kumbara	Kannada	Manava Dehavu Moole Mamsada Thadike	G. K. Venkatesh	
1974	Bhakta Kumbara	Kannada	Vitala Vitala Panduranga Vitala	G. K. Venkatesh	
1974	Bhakta Kumbara	Kannada	Kande Hariya Kande	G. K. Venkatesh	
1974	Bhakta Kumbara	Kannada	Lakshmi Sthothram	G. K. Venkatesh	
1974	Bhakta Kumbara	Kannada	Vitala Panduranga	G. K. Venkatesh	
1974	Bhootayyana Maga Ayyu	Kannada	Malenaada Henna	G. K. Venkatesh	S. Janaki
1974	Bhootayyana Maga Ayyu	Kannada	Maariya Gathiyendu	G. K. Venkatesh	G. K. Venkatesh
1974	Devi Kanyakumari	Malayalam	Sree Bhagavathi	G. Devarajan	
1974	Do Haath 100 Bandooken	Hindi	Ab Na Ja	Satyam	B. Vasantha
1974	Durga	Malayalam	Amme Maalikappurathamme	G. Devarajan	L. R. Eswari
1974	Eradu Kanasu	Kannada	Thamnam Thamnam	Rajan–Nagendra	S. Janaki
1974	Eradu Kanasu	Kannada	Endendu Ninnanu Marethu	Rajan–Nagendra	Vani Jayaram
1974	Eradu Kanasu	Kannada	Baadi Hoda Balliyinda	Rajan–Nagendra	
1974	Eradu Kanasu	Kannada	Endu Ninna Noduve	Rajan–Nagendra	
1974	Lav Kush	Hindi	Jai Jai Ram Jug Abhiram	Ghantasala & J. V. Raghavulu	P. Susheela & Vani Jayaram
1974	Lav Kush	Hindi	Ashwamedh Yagya Ki Jai Ho	Ghantasala & J. V. Raghavulu	
1974	Lav Kush	Hindi	Chuk Chuk Chhaba	Ghantasala & J. V. Raghavulu	
1974	Naan Avanillai	Tamil	Naan Chinna Chiru	M.S. Viswanathan	P. Susheela
1974	Professor Huchuraya	Kannada	Doora Doora Alle Nilli	Rajan–Nagendra	P. Susheela
1974	Sampathige Savaal	Kannada	Raja Muddu Raja	G. K. Venkatesh	S. Janaki
1974	Sampathige Savaal	Kannada	Naguvudo Aluvudo	G. K. Venkatesh	
1974	Sati Anusuya	Hindi	Kaisi Ye Maya Kya Daiv Leela	P. Adinarayana Rao & M. Ranga Rao	
1974	Sati Anusuya	Hindi	O Piye Bahio Me Aa Jhool Ke	P. Adinarayana Rao & M. Ranga Rao	S. Janaki
1974	Upasane	Kannada	Karaagre Vasathe Lakshmi	Vijaya Bhaskar	L. R. Anjali
1975	Alakh Niranjan	Hindi	Raam Hai Sugun	Satyam	
1975	Alakh Niranjan	Hindi	Dev Danam Ke Sagar Manthan Se	Satyam	
1975	Bhagya Jyothi	Kannada	Kumkuma Haneyali	Vijaya Bhaskar	Vani Jayaram
1975	Bhakti Mein Bhagwan	Hindi	Dekho Hari Dekho	G. K. Venkatesh & M. Ranga Rao	
1975	Daari Tappida Maga	Kannada	Kaapadu Sri Satyanarayana	G. K. Venkatesh	A. P. Komala & S. Janaki
1975	Daari Tappida Maga	Kannada	Haayaadha Ee Vele	G. K. Venkatesh	S. Janaki
1975	Daari Tappida Maga	Kannada	Kannanchina Ee Mathali	G. K. Venkatesh	
1975	Devara Gudi	Kannada	Naa Bayasada Bhagya	Rajan–Nagendra	P. Susheela
1975	Kalla Kulla	Kannada	Suthha Muthha Yaaru Illa	Rajan–Nagendra	Vani Jayaram
1975	Kalla Kulla	Kannada	Madana Prema Sadana	Rajan–Nagendra	S. Janaki
1975	Kalla Kulla	Kannada	Amma Endare	Rajan–Nagendra	H. Krishnamurthy
1975	Kaveri	Kannada	Aakashadalli Baanaa Diyaagi	M. Ranga Rao	S. Janaki
1975	Mayura	Kannada	Kelo Manganna	G. K. Venkatesh	
1975	Shubhamangala	Kannada	Shubhamangala Sumuhurthave	Vijaya Bhaskar	Vani Jayaram
1975	Uttarayanam	Malayalam	Sreemahaaganesha Sthothram	K. Raghavan	
1976	Badavara Bandhu	Kannada	Naga Beda Naga Beda	M. Ranga Rao	
1976	Bahaddur Gandu	Kannada	Alle Nillu	M. Ranga Rao	S. Janaki
1976	Besuge	Kannada	Arere Intha Gandige	Vijaya Bhaskar	Kasthuri Shankar, L. R. Anjali & Mahesh
1976	Dashavtar	Hindi	Satya Mite Jab	S. Rajeswara Rao & M. Ranga Rao	
1976	Dashavtar	Hindi	Vachan Pita Ka Mantar Naam Hai	S. Rajeswara Rao & M. Ranga Rao	S. Janaki & Manna Dey
1976	Dashavtar	Hindi	Hiranyay Namha Ye To Bolo Re	S. Rajeswara Rao & M. Ranga Rao	Latha Raju & Prakash Latkar
1976	Hudugatada Hudugi	Kannada	Hindendu Kandilla Naane Ullasa	M. Ranga Rao	
1976	Jeevan Jyoti	Hindi		Salil Chowdhury	
1976	Love In Kashmir	Hindi	Kya Hai Gham Yuhi Aap Hum Muskuraye	C. Arjun	Vani Jairam
1976	Mayooraa	Hindi	Dekho Bandar Laal	G. K. Venkatesh & M. Ranga Rao	
1976	Mayooraa	Hindi	Naino Se Door To Na Jaao	G. K. Venkatesh & M. Ranga Rao	
1976	Naa Ninna Mareyalare	Kannada	Sihi Muthu Sihi Muthu	Rajan–Nagendra	S. Janaki
1976	Premada Kanike	Kannada	Chinna Endu Naguthiru	Upendra Kumar	
1976	Raja Nanna Raja	Kannada	Nooru Kannu Saladu	G. K. Venkatesh	S. P. Balasubrahmanyam
1976	Raja Nanna Raja	Kannada	Ninade Nenapu Dinavu	G. K. Venkatesh	
1976	Seetha Swayamvaram	Malayalam	Shudhalakshmeer	K. V. Mahadevan & V. Dakshinamoorthy	
1976	Seetha Swayamvaram	Malayalam	Lakshmeem	K. V. Mahadevan & V. Dakshinamoorthy	
1976	Seetha Swayamvaram	Malayalam	Vanasanchaaram Cheyyum	K. V. Mahadevan & V. Dakshinamoorthy	K. P. Brahmanandan & Jayashree
1976	Sita Kalyanam	Telugu	Kalyanam Choodam	K. V. Mahadevan	P. Susheela
1976	Sita Kalyanam	Telugu	Mahavishnuvu	K. V. Mahadevan	P. Susheela
1976	Sita Kalyanam	Telugu	Seetha Ramula	K. V. Mahadevan	P. Susheela & S. P. Balasubrahmanyam
1976	Swapnadanam	Malayalam	Kanneerkkadalil	Bhaskar Chandavarkar	
1977	Babruvahana	Kannada	Ninna Kanna Notadalli	T. G. Lingappa	
1977	Babruvahana	Kannada	Yaaru Thiliyaru Ninna Bhujabalada	T. G. Lingappa	Rajkumar
1977	Bayasade Banda Bhagya	Kannada	Preethisu Sameepisu	Rajan–Nagendra	S. Janaki
1977	Bhagyavantharu	Kannada	Bhagyavantharu Naave	Rajan–Nagendra	S. Janaki & S. P. Balasubrahmanyam
1977	Chakradhari	Telugu		G. K. Venkatesh	
1977	Devara Duddu	Kannada	Godhuli	Rajan–Nagendra	P. Susheela
1977	Devara Duddu	Kannada	Krishna..Gaaliya Patadanthe	Rajan–Nagendra	
1977	Dhanalakshmi	Kannada	Dhanalakshmi Daye Thoru	M. Ranga Rao	
1977	Hemavathi	Kannada	Guhanalli Sodara Vaatsalya	L. Vaidyanathan	
1977	Hemavathi	Kannada	Shuddabrahma	L. Vaidyanathan	
1977	Jagadguru Aadisankaran	Malayalam	Nabhramir Nathoyam	V. Dakshinamoorthy	
1977	Jagadguru Aadisankaran	Malayalam	Paryankatham Vrajathiya	V. Dakshinamoorthy	
1977	Kanneshwara Rama	Kannada	Naraveera Kanneshwara Rama	B. V. Karanth	
1977	Maagiya Kanasu	Kannada	Neene Nanna Kavyakannake	Vijaya Bhaskar	
1977	Nagarahole	Kannada	Hey Hey Piltu Hey Hey Chiltu	Satyam	S. Janaki
1977	Sanaadi Appanna	Kannada	Naane Thaayi Naane Thande	G. K. Venkatesh	
1977	Shani Prabhava	Kannada	Namo Namo Shaniraja	M. Ranga Rao	
1977	Sose Tanda Soubhagya	Kannada	Ravi Varmana	G. K. Venkatesh	S. Janaki
1977	Tabbaliyu Neenade Magane	Kannada	Dharani Mandala Madhyadolage	Bhaskar Chandavarkar	
1977	Zee Boom Baa	Hindi	Dil Ka Le Le Salaam	M. Ranga Rao	
1977	Zee Boom Baa	Hindi	Kaun Si Cheez Hai Aisi	M. Ranga Rao	Vani Jairam
1977	Zee Boom Baa	Hindi	Sakhi Sapne Me Priyatam Ke Sang Soyi Ri	M. Ranga Rao	Vani Jairam
1977	Zee Boom Baa	Hindi	Aiyi Bahare Kho Ja	M. Ranga Rao	Vani Jairam & Madhukar
1978	Gorantha Deepam	Telugu	He Mohana Ranga	K. V. Mahadevan & Sajjad Hussain	P. Susheela
1978	Muyyige Muyyi	Kannada	Belli Chukki Belli Chukki	Satyam	S. P. Balasubrahmanyam, Bangalore Latha & P. Susheela
1978	Paduvaaralli Pandavaru	Kannada	Haadomme Haadabeku	Vijaya Bhaskar	S. P. Balasubrahmanyam
1978	Paduvaaralli Pandavaru	Kannada	Thookadisi Thookadisi Beeladiru Thamma	Vijaya Bhaskar	
1978	Raju Rahim	Malayalam	Bruce Lee Kunjallayo	M. K. Arjunan	P. Jayachandran & C. O. Anto
1978	Swarna Bhoomi	Kannada	Kaanada Devaru; Siri Kannada Naadu		
1979	Asadhya Aliya	Kannada	Kannalli Kanna Ittu	G. K. Venkatesh	S. P. Balasubrahmanyam
1979	Inikkum Ilamai	Tamil	Maalai Mayanginaal	Shankar–Ganesh	S. P. Sailaja
1979	Kadavul Amaitha Medai	Tamil	Thendrale Nee Pesu	Ilaiyaraaja	
1979	Laxmi Pooja	Hindi	Pranaam Barambar		Vani Jairam
1979	Sri Tirupati Venkateswara Kalyanam	Telugu	Suprabhatham	Pendyala Nageswara Rao	S. P. Balasubrahmanyam & V. Ramakrishna
1980	Aakali Rajyam	Telugu	Tu Hai Raja	M. S. Viswanathan	S. Janaki
1980	Driver Hanumanthu	Kannada	Vande	Vijaya Bhaskar	
1980	Pattanakke Banda Pathniyaru	Kannada	Elli Nanna Gilimariyu	M. Ranga Rao	S. P. Balasubrahmanyam
1980	Pattanakke Banda Pathniyaru	Kannada	Shankara	M. Ranga Rao	S. P. Balasubrahmanyam, S. Janaki & Banglore Latha
1980	Rama Parushurama	Kannada	Hombisilu Bandaayithu	Rajan–Nagendra	S. Janaki
1980	Varumayin Niram Sivappu	Tamil	Tu Hai Raja	M. S. Viswanathan	S. Janaki
1981	Keralida Simha	Kannada	Amma Neenu Namagaagi	Satyam	Rajkumar
1981	Mareyada Haadu	Kannada	Baanalli Thara	G. K. Venkatesh	
1982	Hasyaratna Ramakrishna	Kannada	Bhoomiya Thanditta	T. G. Lingappa	
1982	Jimmy Gallu	Kannada	Nanna Janumave	Vijaya Bhaskar	Vani Jayaram
1982	Maanasa Sarovara	Kannada	Vedanthi Helidanu	Vijaya Bhaskar	
1982	Suvarna Sethuve	Kannada	Venku Chinku	Vijaya Bhaskar	Bangalore Latha
1983	Kokilamma	Telugu	Madhuram Madhuram Nadam	M. S. Viswanathan	S. P. Balasubrahmanyam
1983	Kranthiyogi Basavanna	Kannada	Odhagite Namagintha Bhagya	M. Ranga Rao	Vani Jairam
1984	Gandu Bherunda	Kannada	Gaganake Soorya	Satyam	S. P. Balasubrahmanyam
1984	Huli Hejje	Kannada	Ahamevaasmi	Vijaya Bhaskar	Vani Jayaram
1985	Ade Kannu	Kannada	Ninnee Naguve	G. K. Venkatesh	Rajkumar
1985	Bettada Hoovu	Kannada	Thaayi Sharade	Rajan–Nagendra	Puneeth Rajkumar
1986	Oomai Vizhigal	Tamil	Tholvi Nilayenna Ninaitthaal	Manoj–Gyan & Aabavanan	Aabavanan
1989	Nanjundi Kalyana	Kannada	Baalu Ondu Bandi	Upendra Kumar	
1989	Poo Manam	Tamil	Silaneram Yedhedho Nadakum	Vidyasagar	
1990	Purappadu	Malayalam	Doore Doore Doore	Ouseppachan	K. S. Chithra
1992	Naalaya Seidhi	Tamil	Uyire Unnai Idhayam	Adithyan	Sangeethakatti
1993	Airport	Tamil	Uyire Unnai	S. P. Venkatesh	
1995	Srigandha	Kannada	O Andharamma Andharu	Hamsalekha	
2004	7G Rainbow Colony	Tamil	Ithu Enna Maatram	Yuvan Shankar Raja	
2010	Ayirathil Oruvan	Tamil	Pemmanae	G. V. Prakash Kumar	Bombay Jayashri

== Death ==
Sreenivas died of a massive heart attack at home in Chennai on 14 April 2013 at the age of 82. He was cremated on the next day. He was survived by his wife and children.
