= Sathyabhama (1963 film) =

Sathyabhaama
- Directed by: M. S. Mani
- Written by: Mythology; Ponkunnam Varkey (dialogues)
- Screenplay by: Ponkunnam Varkey
- Produced by: T. E. Vasudevan
- Starring: Prem Nazir; Adoor Bhasi; Thikkurissy Sukumaran Nair; C. R. K. Nair
- Cinematography: Melli Irani
- Edited by: M. S. Mani
- Music by: V. Dakshinamoorthy
- Production company: Associated Producers
- Distributed by: Associated Producers
- Release date: 14 April 1963
- Country: India
- Language: Malayalam

Sathyabhaama (transl. Illustrious Truth) is a 1963 Indian Malayalam-language film, directed by M. S. Mani and produced by T. E. Vasudevan. The film stars Prem Nazir, Adoor Bhasi, Thikkurissy Sukumaran Nair and C. R. K. Nair. The film had musical score by V. Dakshinamoorthy.

== Cast ==
- Prem Nazir
- Adoor Bhasi
- Thikkurissy Sukumaran Nair
- C. R. K. Nair
- Ambika
- Baby Padmini
- Kottarakkara Sreedharan Nair
- L. Vijayalakshmi

== Soundtrack ==
The music was composed by V. Dakshinamoorthy and the lyrics were written by Abhayadev.

No.	Song	Singers	Lyrics	Length (m:ss)
1	"Araamathin Sundariyalle"	S. Janaki	Abhayadev	
2	"Gokulathil Pandu"	P. Leela	Abhayadev	
3	"Idathu Kannilakunnathenthinaano"	S. Janaki	Abhayadev	
4	"Jaya Jaya Naarayana"	Kamukara	Abhayadev	
5	"Kaadinte Karaluthudichu"	P. Leela, Chorus	Abhayadev	
6	"Maathe Jaganmaathe"	P. Leela	Abhayadev	
7	"Mannavanaayaalum"	P. B. Sreenivas	Abhayadev	
8	"Mathi Mathi Maayaaleelakal"	P. Leela	Abhayadev	
9	"Oru Vazhi Cholken"	P. Susheela	Abhayadev	
10	"Prabhaathakaale Brahmaavaayee"	K. J. Yesudas	Abhayadev	
11	"Prakaasha Roopa Sooryadeva"	K. J. Yesudas	Abhayadev	
12	"Vaadaruthee Malarini"	P. Leela, K. P. Udayabhanu	Abhayadev	
