= Kusruthykuttan =

- Directed by: M. Krishnan Nair
- Screenplay by: Thikkurissy Sukumaran Nair
- Produced by: Muhammad Assam
- Starring: Thikkurissy Sukumaran Nair; Ambika; Suresh Varma; Sukumari
- Music by: Vijayabhaskar
- Release date: 11 March 1966
- Country: India
- Language: Malayalam

Kusruthykuttan (transl. The Mischievous Boy) is a 1966 Indian Malayalam-language film, directed by M. Krishnan Nair and produced by Muhammad Assam. The film stars Thikkurissy Sukumaran Nair, Ambika, Suresh Varma and Sukumari. The film had musical score by Vijayabhaskar. This film was inspired by the Bollywood film Deeksha.

== Cast ==
- Thikkurissy Sukumaran Nair as Madhavan Nair
- Ambika as Lakshmi
- Suresh Varma as Gopi
- Sukumari
- Adoor Bhasi
- Muthukulam Raghavan Pillai
- B. N. Nambiar
- Pankajavalli as Lakshmi's mother
- Suresh Kumar

== Soundtrack ==
The music was composed by Vijayabhaskar and the lyrics were written by P. Bhaskaran.

No.	Song	Singers	Lyrics	Length (m:ss)
1	"Ammaye Kalippikkan"	S. Janaki	P. Bhaskaran	
2	"Ammaye Kalippikkan" (Pathos)	S. Janaki, B. Vasantha	P. Bhaskaran	
3	"Ammaye Kalippikkan"	S. Janaki, B. Vasantha	P. Bhaskaran	
4	"Manichilambe"	B. Vasantha	P. Bhaskaran	
5	"Punnellu Koythallo"	S. Janaki, P. B. Sreenivas	P. Bhaskaran	
6	"Raareero Unni"	S. Janaki	P. Bhaskaran	
