= Sita Kalyanam (1976 film) =

Seetha Kalyanam
- Directed by: Bapu
- Written by: Mullapudi Venkata Ramana
- Based on: Ramayanam by Valmiki
- Produced by: Pinjala Ananda Rao; P.Subba Rao
- Starring: Ravikumar; Jaya Prada; Gummadi; Dhulipala; Mikkilineni; Kaikala Satyanarayana; Mukkamala; Jamuna; Hemalatha
- Cinematography: K. S. Prasad
- Edited by: Kandaswamy
- Music by: K. V. Mahadevan
- Production company: Ananda Lakshmi Art Movies
- Release date: 8 October 1976
- Running time: 125 minutes
- Country: India
- Language: Telugu

Seetha Kalyanam is a 1976 Indian Telugu-language Hindu mythological film directed by Bapu from a screenplay written by Mullapudi Venkata Ramana. It is an adaptation of Ranganatha Ramayanam in Telugu. Based on the Bala Kanda, the ensemble cast film relates events from the birth of Lord Rama, the seventh incarnation of Vishnu, up to his wedding to Seetha, incarnation of Lakshmi.

The film won the Filmfare Award for Best Direction (Telugu). It was screened at the BFI London Film Festival, Chicago International Film Festival, San Reno and Denver International Film Festivals in 1978, and is part of the course work at the British Film Institute.

== Plot ==
Granted several boons by the gods Brahma and Shiva, Ravana, the demon king of Lanka, uses his many powers to plague all creation, notably molesting women, many of whom he kidnaps. At the appeal of the gods and the sages, Vishnu assures them that he shall take an incarnation as a mortal, as the arrogant Rakshasa had never sought protection from men (or apes).

The goddess Lakshmi chooses to accompany her divine consort, first as the ascetic Vedaavati (who is insulted by Ravana), then as a baby who appears from a golden lotus in Ravana’s own palace in Lanka, and finally as the child who is discovered when Janaka, king of Videha, is performing the ritual of ploughing the ground before a sacrifice.

The film then describes the events that reunite the divine couple, stringing along the way various tales, in song and dance form, from the Rāmāyana that are tangentially related to the main narrative, including the creation of Lord Shiva’s bow, Vishnu’s avatar as Vamana, and the descent of the Ganga.

The movie ends with Parasurama, Visvamitra, and Vasishta being granted a vision of Rama, Seetha, Lakshmana, Bharata, and Shatrughna in their true, celestial, forms.

== Cast ==
- Ravi Kumar as Lord Vishnu / Lord Rama
- Jaya Prada as Goddess Lakshmi / Goddess Seetha
- Gummadi as Dasharatha
- Kanta Rao as Narada
- Mikkilineni as Janaka
- Mukkamala as Vishwamitra
- Kaikala Satyanarayana as Ravana
- Dhulipala as Vashistha
- Tyagaraju as Parashurama
- Hemalata as Kausalya
- Jamuna as Kaikeyi
- P. R. Varalakshmi as Sumitra
- Mamata as Mandodari
- P.J. Sarma as Sukracharya
- Bheemaraju as Bali Chakravarthi

== Soundtrack ==
The film has music composed by K. V. Mahadevan with lyrics written by Thyagaraya Swamy, Bhakta Ramadasu, Arudra, and C. Narayana Reddy. Playback singers P. Susheela, S.P. Balasubrahmanyam, V. Ramakrishna, Vasantha, and P. B. Sreenivas gave vocals.

== Release ==
The film was released in Hindi with the title Sita Swayamvar and Malayalam as Seetha Swayamvaram.

== Awards ==
Filmfare Awards South

- 1976 - Filmfare Best Director Award (Telugu) – Bapu
- 1976 - Filmfare Special Award for Excellent Performance - Gummadi
