= Ambika Sukumaran =

Indian actress

- Born: Thiruvananthapuram, Kerala, India
- Occupations: Classical dancer Actress
- Years active: 1952 – 1979
- Spouse: K. V. Sukumaran
- Children: 2
- Relatives: Travancore family, Raja Ravi Varma (Great Grandfather)

Ambika Sukumaran Nair is an Indian former actress best known for her work in Malayalam cinema during the 1950s and 1960s. She is a close relative of the Travancore Sisters; Lalitha, Padmini and Ragini, and also Shobana, Vineeth, Krishna and Sukumari. Ambika debuted in Udaya Studio's film Visappinte Vili in 1952; she is also the first heroine of Prem Nazir. In 1968, she acted as the lead actress in the first full-length comedy in Malayalam cinema Viruthan Shanku, directed by P. Venu. She acted in more than 80 movies.

== Personal life ==
She married Sukumaran and left cinema, settling in the US. They have two daughters. She is a trained Bharatanatyam dancer. She ran a dance school in New Jersey before retiring.

== Partial filmography ==
=== Malayalam ===
Year	Title	Role	Notes
1952	Visappinte Vili	Dancer	
1956	Koodappirappu	Parvathi	
1959	Naadodikal	Sharadha	
1959	Aana Valarthiya Vanampadi		
1960	Sthreehridayam		
1961	Mudiyanaya Puthran	Radha	
1961	Bhakta Kuchela	Rukmini	
1961	Arappavan	Kalyani	
1961	Christmas Rathri	Gracy	
1961	Sabarimala Ayyappan	Panthalam Rani	
1961	Ummini Thanka	Dancer	
1961	Kandam Becha Kottu	Kunju Bivi	
1961	Krishna Kuchela	Sathyabhama	
1962	Kannum Karalum	Sarala	
1962	Sreekovil	Radha	
1962	Veluthambi Dalawa	Seethalakshmi	
1962	Snehadeepam	Vilasini	
1962	Swargarajyam	Baby	
1963	Ninamaninja Kalpadukal	Thankamma	
1963	Moodupadam	Amina	
1963	Susheela	Nalini	
1963	Ammaye Kaanaan	Madhavi	
1963	Chilamboli	Sumangala	
1963	Sathyabhama	Sathyabhama	
1963	Nithya Kanyaka	Nalini	
1964	Oral Koodi Kallanayi	Devaki	
1964	School Master	Vishalam	
1964	Kalanju Kittiya Thankam	Girija	
1964	Thacholi Othenan	Kunji Kunki	
1964	Kutti Kuppayam	Subaida	
1964	Pazhassi Raja		
1964	Omanakuttan	Bhavani	
1964	Aadya Kiranangal	Gracy	
1964	Devaalayam	Sumathi	
1964	Sree Guruvayoorappan	Manjula	
1965	Ammu	Ammu	
1965	Kathirunna Nikah	Wahida	
1965	Chettathi	Nirmala	
1965	Jeevitha Yaathra	Lakshmi	
1965	Devatha	Ammini	
1965	Subaidha	Subaida	
1965	Shyamala Chechi	Shyamala	
1965	Kadathukaran	Thankamma	
1965	Thommante Makkal	Soshamma	
1965	Sarpakadu	Nagaprabha	
1965	Kuppivala	Khadeeja	
1965	Thankakudam	Suhara	
1966	Koottukar	Khadeeja	
1966	Kusruthykuttan	Lakshmi	
1966	Kayamkulam Kochunni		
1966	Poochakkanni		
1966	Penmakkal	Kamala	
1966	Pinchuhridhayam	Malathy	
1966	Anarkali	Jodhabhai	
1967	Kudumbam	Radha	
1967	Chekuthante Kotta		
1967	N.G.O		
1967	Collector Malathy	Indu	
1968	Viruthan Shanku	Kunjikkavu	
1968	Midumidukki	Saraswati	
1968	Vazhi Pizhacha Santhathi		
1968	Adhyapika	Thankamma	
1968	Aparadhini		
1969	Kuruthykkalam		
1969	Vilakkapetta Bendhangal		
1969	Velliyazhcha	Chitra	
1969	Mooladhanam	Malathi	
1969	Virunnukari	Malathi	
1969	Nadhi	Leela	
1970	Sabarimala Sree Dharmashastha		
1970	Ara Nazhika Neram	Kuttiyamma	
1970	Sthree	Vasanthi	
1971	Moonu Pookkal	Valsala	
1972	Kalippava		
1974	Checkpost		
1977	Allahu Akbar		
2011	Naayika	Herself	Video footage
2014	Tharangal	Herself	photo
2019	Thanka Bhasma Kuriyitta Thamburatty	Herself	photo

=== Tamil ===
Year	Title	Role	Notes
1953	Ponni	Dancer	
1956	Rambaiyin Kaadhal	Menaka	
1956	Raja Rani	Dancer	
1956	Mathar Kula Manikkam	Dancer	
1957	Pudhu Vazhvu	Dancer	
1959	Yaanai Valartha Vanampadi		
1960	Rathinapuri Ilavarasi		
1960	Ivan Avanethan		
1961	Sri Valli		
1963	Naan Vanangum Deivam		
1967	Kandhan Karunai	Padumakomalai	
1968	Thillana Mohanambal	Maragatham	

=== Telugu ===
Year	Title	Role	Notes
1956	Charana Daasi	Dancer	
1960	Rani Ratnaprabha	Dancer	
1962	Dakshayagnam	Urvashi	

=== Kannada ===
Year	Title	Role	Notes
1959	Abba Aa Hudugi	Dancer	

=== Hindi ===
Year	Title	Role	Notes
1963	Royal Mail	Rajkumari	
1965	Mahabharat	Hidimbi	

== TV Shows - Guest ==
- Sthree (ACV)
- Morning Guest (Media One)
- Interview (Manorama News)
- Rangoli (Doordarshan Malayalam)
- Innalathe Tharam (Amrita TV)
- Film Views

== Dramas ==
- Kuttavum Shikshayum
