= Susheela (film) =

- Poster
- Directed by: K. S. Sethumadhavan
- Written by: Ganesh Subrahmaniam; Ponkunnam Varkey (dialogues)
- Screenplay by: K. S. Sethumadhavan
- Produced by: N. S. Dravyam
- Starring: Prem Nazir; Sheela; Adoor Bhasi; Thikkurissy Sukumaran Nair
- Cinematography: P. Ramaswami
- Music by: V. Dakshinamoorthy
- Release date: 10 May 1963
- Country: India
- Language: Malayalam

Susheela is a 1963 Indian Malayalam-language film, directed by K. S. Sethumadhavan and produced by N. S. Dravyam. The film stars Prem Nazir, Sheela, Adoor Bhasi and Thikkurissy Sukumaran Nair. It is a remake of Tamil film Kumudham. The film had musical score by V. Dakshinamoorthy.

== Cast ==
- Prem Nazir
- Sheela
- Adoor Bhasi
- Thikkurissy Sukumaran Nair
- Ambika
- Bahadoor
- Miss Kumari

== Soundtrack ==
The music was composed by V. Dakshinamoorthy and the lyrics were written by P. Bhaskaran, Abhayadev and Vallathol.

No.	Song	Singers	Lyrics	Length (m:ss)
1	"Kandotte Onnu Kandotte"	P. Susheela	P. Bhaskaran	
2	"Kandu Njaan Ninmukham"	S. Janaki	P. Bhaskaran	
3	"Kulirkaatte Nee"	P. Leela	Abhayadev	
4	"Njanoru Kadha Parayaam"	P. Leela, Kamukara	Abhayadev	
5	"Thaalolam"	M. L. Vasanthakumari	Abhayadev	
6	"Thaalolam" (Pathos)	P. Susheela	Abhayadev	
7	"Thaskaranalla Njan" (Bharathastreekalthan)	P. B. Sreenivas, K. P. Udayabhanu, Prabha	Vallathol	
8	"Yaathrakkaara Vazhiyaathrakkaara"	K. P. Udayabhanu	Abhayadev	
