= Swargarajyam =

- Directed by: P. B. Unni
- Written by: Norbert Pavana
- Screenplay by: Norbert Pavana
- Produced by: Shanmukha Pictures
- Starring: K.P. Ummer, G.K. Pillai, T. R. Omana; T. S. Muthaiah; Ambika; Angamuthu
- Cinematography: Baby
- Edited by: Baby
- Music by: M. B. Sreenivasan
- Production company: Seetha Films
- Distributed by: Seetha Films
- Release date: 26 October 1962
- Country: India
- Language: Malayalam

Swargarajyam (English: The Kingdom of Heaven) is a 1962 Indian Malayalam-language film, directed by P. B. Unni and produced by Shanmukha Pictures. The film stars T. R. Omana, T. S. Muthaiah, Ambika and Angamuthu. It featured a musical score by M. B. Sreenivasan.

== Cast ==
- T. R. Omana
- T. S. Muthaiah
- Ambika
- Angamuthu
- GK Pillai
- K. P. Ummer
- Kumari Saraswathi
- Kunjandi
- Mary Eddy
- Sarasa

== Soundtrack ==
The music was composed by M. B. Sreenivasan and the lyrics were written by P. Bhaskaran.

No.	Song	Singers	Lyrics	Length (m:ss)
1	"Aadu Sakhi"	P. B. Sreenivas	P. Bhaskaran	
2	"Ellam Kazhinju Thelinja"	S. Janaki	P. Bhaskaran	
3	"Irunduvallo Paarum Vaanum"	Shantha P. Nair	P. Bhaskaran	
4	"Karalinte Karalile"	M. B. Sreenivasan	P. Bhaskaran	
5	"Oru Nadeetheerathil"	K. R. Balakrishnan, Santha	P. Bhaskaran	
6	"Pandu Pandu Pande"	R. Balasaraswathi Devi	P. Bhaskaran	
7	"Thinkale"	Shantha P. Nair	P. Bhaskaran	
8	"Vannaatte Thathamma"	K. P. Udayabhanu	P. Bhaskaran	
9	"Veluvelungane"	Shantha P. Nair	P. Bhaskaran	
