= Pinjala Ananda Rao =

Indian film producer

P. Ananda Rao
- Born: Andhra Pradesh, India
- Occupation: Producer

Pinjala Ananda Rao was an Indian film producer known for his work in Telugu cinema. He has mostly produced and distributed mythological and folklore films under the production house Ananda Lakshmi Art Movies. In 1976, he produced Seeta Kalyanam was screened at the BFI London Film Festival, Chicago International Film Festival

== Selected filmography ==
- Seeta Kalyanam
- Lakshmi Pooja
- Maha Shakthi
- Vikramarka Vijayam
- Jaganmohini
