= Shyamala Chechi =

- Directed by: P. Bhaskaran
- Written by: P. Bhaskaran; Thoppil Bhasi (dialogues)
- Screenplay by: Thoppil Bhasi
- Produced by: R. Chella Durai; V. Abdulla
- Starring: Sathyan; Ambika; Sukumari; Adoor Bhasi
- Cinematography: U. Rajagopal
- Edited by: R. Venkattaraman
- Music by: K. Raghavan
- Release date: 18 February 1965
- Country: India
- Language: Malayalam

Shyamala Chechi is a 1965 Indian Malayalam film directed by P. Bhaskaran and produced by R. Chella Durai and V. Abdulla. The film stars Sathyan, Ambika, Sukumari and Adoor Bhasi. The film has a musical score by K. Raghavan.

== Cast ==
- Sathyan
- Ambika
- Sukumari
- Adoor Bhasi
- Pappukutty Bhagavathar
- T. R. Omana
- T. S. Muthaiah
- Bahadoor
- Kottarakkara Sreedharan Nair
- Pariyanampatta
- Premji
- T. Damodaran

== Soundtrack ==
The music was composed by K. Raghavan, with lyrics by Thunchathezhuthachan and P. Bhaskaran. Background music was composed by M. B. Sreenivasan.

No.	Song	Singers	Lyrics	Length (m:ss)
1	"Ennathu Kettu"	P. Leela	Thunchathezhuthachan	
2	"Enthe Chandran"	S. Janaki	P. Bhaskaran	
3	"Kaanumbolingane"	S. Janaki	P. Bhaskaran	
4	"Kaithozhaam Kanna"	P. Leela, A. P. Komala	P. Bhaskaran	
5	"Kanakakkinaavinte"	K. J. Yesudas	P. Bhaskaran	
6	"Kandaalaarkum"	P. Leela	P. Bhaskaran	
7	"Kannupotthikkali"	A. P. Komala	P. Bhaskaran	
8	"Pettavalanne"	K. P. Udayabhanu	P. Bhaskaran	
