= Thaskaraveeran =

Thaskaraveeran may refer to:

- Thaskaraveeran (1957 film), Malayalam film starring Sathyan and Ragini
- Thaskaraveeran (2005 film), Malayalam film starring Mammootty and Nayantara
