= Vilakkapetta Bendhangal =

- Directed by: M. S. Mani
- Written by: Kousalya Devi; S. L. Puram Sadanandan (dialogues)
- Starring: Prem Nazir; Sathyan; Ambika; Adoor Bhasi
- Music by: A. T. Ummer
- Production company: Kalalaya Films
- Release date: 19 September 1969
- Country: India
- Language: Malayalam

Vilakkapetta Bendhangal (transl. Forbidden relationships) is a 1969 Indian Malayalam-language film directed by M. S. Mani. The film stars Prem Nazir, Sathyan, Ambika and Adoor Bhasi in the lead roles. It is a remake of the Telugu film Doctor Chakravarty.

== Cast ==
- Prem Nazir
- Sathyan
- Ambika
- Adoor Bhasi
- T. R. Omana
- K. P. Ummer
- Khadeeja
- Sadhana
- T. K. Balachandran
- Ushakumari

== Production ==
The filming was held at Venus Studios.

== Soundtrack ==
The music was composed by A. T. Ummer and the lyrics were written by Dr. Pavithran.

Song	Singers	Lyrics	Length (m:ss)
"Kaiviral Thumbonnu"	K. J. Yesudas, B. Vasantha	Dr. Pavithran	
"Paadano Njan Paadano"	S. Janaki	Dr. Pavithran	
"Paadume Njan Paadume"	S. Janaki	Dr. Pavithran	
"Penninte Kannil"	L. R. Eeswari, P. B. Sreenivas	Dr. Pavithran	
"Swarnamukilukal Swapnam"	S. Janaki	Dr. Pavithran	
