= Arappavan =

1961 film

- Directed by: K. Shankar
- Written by: Kedamangalam Sadanandan
- Screenplay by: Kedamangalam Sadanandan
- Produced by: K. Kumar
- Starring: Sathyan; KPAC Sulochana; Kedamangalam Sadanandan; Pattom Sadan
- Cinematography: Thambu
- Edited by: K. Narayanan
- Music by: G. K. Venkatesh; P. S. Divakar
- Production company: Seva Films
- Distributed by: Seva Films
- Release date: 24 August 1961
- Country: India
- Language: Malayalam

Arappavan (transl. Half a gold coin) is a 1961 Indian Malayalam film, directed by K. Shankar and produced by K. Kumar. The film stars Sathyan, KPAC Sulochana, Kedamangalam Sadanandan and Pattom Sadan. The film had musical score by G. K. Venkatesh and P. S. Divakar.

== Cast ==
- Sathyan as Vettukaaran Ramu
- K. P. A. C. Sulochana as Muthalali's Wife
- Kedamangalam Sadanandan
- Pattom Sadan as Paramu's Brother
- T. S. Muthaiah as Paramu
- Prem Nawas as Bhasi
- Ambika as Kalyani
- GK Pillai as Muthalali
- Kalaikkal Kumaran
- T. R. Omana
- S. P. Pillai as Raphael Mappila
- K. V. Shanthi as Ammini
- Sree Narayana Pillai

== Soundtrack ==
The music was composed by G. K. Venkatesh and P. S. Divakar and lyrics were written by Kedamangalam Sadanandan.

No.	Song	Singers	Lyrics	Length (m:ss)
1	"Aaraadhaneeyam"	KPAC Sulochana	Kedamangalam Sadananda	
2	"Benmihiya"	Pattom Sadan	Kedamangalam Sadanandan	
3	"Chekkanum Vanne"	A. P. Komala	Kedamangalam Sadanandan	
4	"Jaathi MathaJaathi"	P. Leela, P. B. Sreenivas, KPAC Sulochana	Kedamangalam Sadanandan	
5	"Kanjikku"	KPAC Sulochana	Kedamangalam Sadanandan	
6	"Karayaathe Karayaathe"	P. Leela	Kedamangalam Sadanandan	
7	"Mathupidikkum"	P. Leela, P. B. Sreenivas	Kedamangalam Sadanandan	
8	"Nithyapattini Thinnu"	KPAC Sulochana	Kedamangalam Sadanandan	
9	"Pinneyum Ozhukunnu"	Kedamangalam Sadanandan	Kedamangalam Sadanandan	
10	"Vaadikkariyunna"	P. B. Sreenivas	Kedamangalam Sadanandan	
