= Ivan Avanethan =

- Theatrical release poster
- Directed by: P. Sridhar
- Screenplay by: Kalaipithan
- Story by: Rashmi
- Produced by: T. G. Raj
- Starring: Udhayakumar; Ambika
- Cinematography: T. V. Balu
- Edited by: G. Venkataraman
- Music by: M. Ranga Rao
- Production company: T. G. R. Pictures
- Release date: 25 March 1960
- Country: India
- Language: Tamil

Ivan Avanethan (transl. That is him) is a 1960 Indian Tamil-language film directed by P. Sridhar. The film stars Udhayakumar and Ambika. It was released on 25 March 1960, and became a success. No print of the film is known to survive, making it a lost film.

== Plot ==
Muthu is an uneducated village lad who is in love with his aunt's daughter, Malini. Malini, who has no father and was raised by her mother, is wealthy and well educated. However, she hates Muthu. Sundar, a playboy married to Lakshmi, also has a lover, Prema. Sundar becomes infatuated with Malini's beauty and wealth and entices her to become a stage actress. He is waiting for an opportunity to claim her and her wealth, but Muthu stands as an obstacle to his plans. A psychiatrist named Dr. Gunabhushanam treats Muthu, Malini, Sundar, Lakshmi, and Prema at his clinic. He studies each case and understands the situation. The rest of the story focuses on how he cures everyone and solves their problems.

== Cast ==
The following list is adapted from Film News Anandan's database.

- Udhayakumar
- S. V. Sahasranamam
- K. Sarangapani
- Pandaribai
- Ambika
- Devika
- A. K. Veerasamy
- S. N. Lakshmi
- Rajamani
- Uma

== Production ==
The film, primarily in black-and-white, had three dance sequences in Gevacolor.

== Soundtrack ==
The music was composed by M. Ranga Rao.

| Song | Singer/s | Lyricist | Length |
|---|---|---|---|
| "Devi Jagan Matha" | P. B. Srinivas & P. Leela | Thanjai N. Ramaiah Dass | |
| "Kanne Adi Penne" | Thiruchi Loganathan | M. S. Subramaniam | |
| "Edhu Nijam Edhu Poi" | S. C. Krishnan & M. S. Rajeswari | M. S. Subramaniam | |
| "Penn Endral Paeyum Manam" | Seerkazhi Govindarajan | M. S. Subramaniam | |
| "Happy Jolly Good Day" | S. Janaki | M. S. Subramaniam | |
| "Sembattu Veytti Katti" | S. C. Krishnan | Kalaipithan | |
| "Vaazhkaiyin Paadam" | Thiruchi Loganathan & S. Janaki | Villiputhan | 03:25 |
| "Inba Ellai Kaanum Neram" | P. B. Srinivas & S. Janaki | Villiputhan | 03:19 |
| "Maamuniye Maathavame" | S. Janaki | Kovai Sabapathy | |

== Reception ==
Ivan Avanethan was a box office success, but no print of it is known to survive, making it a lost film.
