= Naadodikal =

- Directed by: S. Ramanathan
- Written by: S. Ramanathan
- Screenplay by: S. Ramanathan
- Produced by: T. K. Pareekutty
- Starring: Prem Nawas; Ambika Sukumaran
- Cinematography: U. K. B. Mani
- Edited by: G. Venkittaraman
- Music by: V. Dakshinamoorthy
- Production company: Chandrathara
- Release date: 11 September 1959
- Country: India
- Language: Malayalam

Naadodikal is a 1959 Indian Malayalam-language film, written and directed by S. Ramanathan and produced by T. K. Pareekutty. The film stars Prem Nawas and Ambika Sukumaran. The film had musical score by V. Dakshinamoorthy.

== Cast ==
- Prem Nawas
- Ambika Sukumaran
- T. R. Omana
- Sukumari
- P. A. Thomas
- T. S. Muthaiah
- Adoor Pankajam
- Kottarakkara Sreedharan Nair
- S. A. Fareed
