= List of Malayalam films of 1974 =

The following is a list of Malayalam films released in the year 1974.

Opening		Sl. No.	Film	Cast	Director	Music director	Notes
J A N	3	1	Angathattu	Prem Nazir, Vijayasree	T. R. Raghunath	G. Devarajan	
J A N	25	2	Kamini	Raghavan, Sobhana	Subair	M. S. Baburaj	
J A N	25	3	Manyasree Viswamithran	Madhu, Sheela	Madhu	Shyam	
F E B	1	4	Pattabhishekam	Prem Nazir, Ushanandini	Mallikarjuna Rao	R. K. Shekhar	
F E B	1	5	Oru Pidi Ari	Madhu, Sharada	P. Bhaskaran	A. T. Ummer	
F E B	15	6	Shapamoksham	Jayan, Sheela	Jesey	G. Devarajan	
F E B	22	7	Jeevikkan Marannupoya Sthree	Sheela, Vijayasree	K. S. Sethumadhavan	M. S. Viswanathan	
F E B	28	8	Chandrakantham	Prem Nazir, Jayabharathi	Sreekumaran Thampi	M. S. Viswanathan	
M A R	1	9	Suprabatham	Prem Nazir, Adoor Bhasi	M. Krishnan Nair	G. Devarajan	
M A R	8	10	Checkpost	Sathyan, Adoor Bhasi	J. D. Thottan	P. S. Divakar	
M A R	15	11	Mister Sundari	Internet Movie Database,	Dr. Vasan	Kannur Rajan	
M A R	22	12	Pancha Thanthram	Prem Nazir, Jayabharathi	J. Sasikumar	G. Devarajan	
M A R	23	13	Rahasyarathri	Prem Nazir, Jayabharathi	A. B. Raj	M. K. Arjunan	
M A R	28	14	Pathiravum Pakalvelichavum	Prem Nazir, Jayabharathi	M. Azad	K. Raghavan	
A P R	5	15	Durga	Prem Nazir, Vijayanirmala	Kunchacko	G. Devarajan	
A P R	11	16	Youvanam	Madhu, Vijayasree	Babu Nanthankodu	V. Dakshinamoorthy	
A P R	11	17	Bad Romance	Zac Crowe	Brenden Wesson	Lady Gaga	
A P R	13	18	Nathoon	Rani Chandra, Vincent	K. Narayanan	M. S. Baburaj	
A P R	19	19	Sethubandhanam	Prem Nazir, Jayabharathi, Baby Sumathi,	J. Sasikumar	G. Devarajan	
M A Y	1	20	Neelakannukal	Madhu, Jayabharathi	Madhu	G. Devarajan	
M A Y	10	21	Chattakkari	Lakshmi, Mohan Sharma	K. S. Sethumadhavan	G. Devarajan	
M A Y	17	22	Night Duty	Prem Nazir, Jayabharathi	J. Sasikumar	V. Dakshinamoorthy	
J U N	7	23	Alakal	Rajesh, Vijayasree	M. D. Mathews	V. Dakshinamoorthy	
J U N	14	24	Moham	Sudheer, Raghavan	Rander Guy	M. K. Arjunan	
J U N	28	25	Nagaram Sagaram	Raghavan, Sumithra	K. P. Pillai	G. Devarajan	
J U L	5	26	Aswathy	Prem Nazir, Sheela	Jesey	V. Dakshinamoorthy	
J U L	12	27	College Girl	Prem Nazir, Vidhubala	Hariharan	A. T. Ummer	
J U L	12	28	Bhoogolam Thiriyunnu	Raghavan, Rani Chandra	Sreekumaran Thampi	V. Dakshinamoorthy	
J U L	26	29	Kanyakumari	Kamal Haasan, Rita Bhaduri	K. S. Sethumadhavan	M. B. Sreenivasan	
A U G	2	30	Ayalathe Sundari	Prem Nazir, Jayabharathi	Hariharan	Shankar–Ganesh	
A U G	3	31	Chakravakam	Prem Nazir, Sujatha	Thoppil Bhasi	Shankar–Ganesh	
A U G	12	32	Chanchala	Prem Nazir, Kaviyoor Ponnamma	S. Sabu	M. K. Arjunan	
A U G	23	33	Thumbolarcha	Prem Nazir, Sheela	Kunchacko	G. Devarajan	
A U G	23	34	Nellu	Prem Nazir, Jayabharathi	Ramu Kariat	Salil Chowdhury	
A U G	29	35	Thacholi Marumakan Chandu	Prem Nazir, Jayabharathi	P. Bhaskaran	V. Dakshinamoorthy	
A U G	30	36	Devi Kanyakumari	Baby Vinodini, Kaviyoor Ponnamma	P. Subramaniam	G. Devarajan	
S E P	27	37	Nadeenadanmare Avasyamundu	Adoor Bhasi, Thikkurissy Sukumaran Nair	Crossbelt Mani	R. K. Shekhar	
O C T	11	38	Rajahamsam	Prem Nazir, Jayabharathi	Hariharan	G. Devarajan	
O C T	17	39	Swarnavigraham	Jayabharathi, Adoor Bhasi	Mohan Gandhiraman	M. B. Sreenivasan	
O C T	25	40	Vishnu Vijayam	Sheela, Kamalahasan	N. Sankaran Nair	G. Devarajan	
N O V	8	41	Sapthaswaragal	Srividya, Raghavan	Baby	V. Dakshinamoorthy	
N O V	10	42	Poonthenaruvi	Prem Nazir, Nanditha Bose	J. Sasikumar	M. K. Arjunan	
N O V	29	43	Bhoomidevi Pushpiniyayi	Prem Nazir, Madhu	Hariharan	G. Devarajan	
D E C	5	44	Honeymoon	Prem Nazir, Jose Prakash	A. B. Raj	M. K. Arjunan	
D E C	8	45	Udayam Kizhakku Thanne	Sukumaran, Sujatha, Pattom Sadan	P. N. Menon	K. J. Yesudas	
D E C	13	46	Vrindavanam	Srividya, Vincent	K. P. Pillai	M. K. Arjunan	
D E C	20	47	Arakkallan Mukkalkkallan	Prem Nazir, Jayabharathi	P. Bhaskaran	V. Dakshinamoorthy	
D E C	21	48	Kunjikkaikal	Prem Nazir, Jayabharathi		K. K. Antony	

== Dubbed movies ==
Movie	Director	Cast	Music	Lyrics
Pennum Ponnum	V. Ramachandra Rao			
Aramanarahasyam	P. Naga Anjanayelu			
Chandana Kadu	(dubbing)			
Pakaram Njangal Chodikkum	Dwarai Bhagavan			
Vilakkapetta Kani	S. R. Puttanna	Nazeer		
Swarnnam Chirikyunnu	Sasikumar	Nazeer, Jayabharathi, A. T. Ummer	M. K. Arjunan	Thampi
