= List of Malayalam films of 1965 =

This a list of Malayalam-language films released in 1965.

Opening		Sl. no.	Film	Cast	Director	Music director	Notes
J A N	14	1	Devatha	Prem Nazir, Sathyan	K. Padmanabhan Nair, W. R. Subba Rao	P. S. Divakar	
F E B	3	2	Subaidha	Madhu, Ambika	M. S. Mani	M. S. Baburaj	
F E B	18	3	Shyamala Chechi	Sathyan, Ambika	P. Bhaskaran	K. Raghavan	
M A R	5	4	Odayil Ninnu	Prem Nazir, Sathyan	K. S. Sethumadhavan	Devarajan	
M A R	12	5	Kadathukaran	Sathyan, Sheela	M. Krishnan Nair	M. S. Baburaj	
A P R	9	6	Porter Kunjali	Prem Nazir, Sheela	J. Sasikumar	M. S. Baburaj	
A P R	10	7	Inapraavugal	Prem Nazir, Satyan	Kunchacko	Dakshinamoorthy	
A P R	10	8	Kaliyodam	Prem Nazir, Madhu	P. Subramaniam	G. Devarajan	
A P R	30	9	Muthalali	Prem Nazir, Sheela	M. A. V. Rajendran	Pukazhenthi	
A P R	30	10	Kalyana Photo	Madhu, Adoor Bhasi	J. D. Thottan	K. Raghavan	
M A Y	7	11	Ammu	Sathyan, Madhu	N. N. Pisharady	M. S. Baburaj	
M A Y	7	12	Kuppivala	Prem Nazir, Sukumari	S. S. Rajan	M. S. Baburaj	
M A Y	28	13	Thankakudam	Prem Nazir, Sheela	S. S. Rajan	M. S. Baburaj	
J U N	4	14	Rosy	Prem Nazir, Kaviyoor Ponnamma	P. N. Menon	K. V. Job	
J U L	10	15	Kattuthulasi	Sathyan, Sharada	M. Krishnan Nair	M. S. Baburaj	
A U G	19	16	Chemmeen	Sathyan, Madhu	Ramu Kariat	Salil Chowdhury	
A U G	28	17	Mayavi	Prem Nazir, Madhu	G. K. Ramu	M. S. Baburaj	
S E P	2	18	Jeevithayaathra	Prem Nazir, Madhu	J. Sasikumar	P. S. Divakar	
S E P	3	19	Rajamalli	Prem Nazir, Sharada	R. S. Prabhu	B. A. Chidambaranath	
S E P	3	20	Kattupookkal	Madhu, Adoor Bhasi	K. Thankappan	G. Devarajan	
S E P	7	21	Kathirunna Nikah	Prem Nazir, Sheela	M. Krishnan Nair	G. Devarajan	
O C T	8	22	Kochumon	Prem Nazir, Sheela	K. Padmanabhan Nair	Alleppey Usman	
O C T	9	23	Bhoomiyile Malakha	Prem Nazir, Sukumari	P. A. Thomas	Jaya Vijaya, M. A. Majeed, P. S. Divakar	
O C T	22	24	Daaham	Sathyan, Sheela	K. S. Sethumadhavan	G. Devarajan	
O C T	22	25	Kavyamela	Prem Nazir, Sheela	M. Krishnan Nair	Dakshinamoorthy	
N O V	13	26	Shakuntala	Prem Nazir, Sathyan	Kunchacko	G. Devarajan	
N O V	20	27	Pattuthoovaala	Madhu, Sheela	P. Subramaniam	G. Devarajan	
N O V	26	28	Chettathi	Prem Nazir, Sathyan	S. R. Puttanna Kanagal	Baburaj	
D E C	24	29	Murappennu	Prem Nazir, K. P. Ummer	A. Vincent	B. A. Chidambaranath	
D E C	24	30	Thommante Makkal	Sathyan, Madhu	J. Sasikumar	M. S. Baburaj	
D E C	31	31	Sarppakavu	Madhu, Sukumari	J. D. Thottan	M. S. Baburaj	
