= Kudumbini =

- Directed by: P. A. Thomas; J. Sasikumar
- Written by: K. G. Sethunath; Kanam E. J. (dialogues)
- Screenplay by: Kanam E. J.
- Produced by: P. A. Thomas
- Starring: Prem Nazir; Sheela; Kaviyoor Ponnamma; Adoor Bhasi
- Cinematography: P. B. Mani
- Edited by: K. D. George
- Music by: L. P. R. Varma
- Production company: Thomas Pictures
- Distributed by: Thomas Pictures
- Release date: 22 December 1964
- Country: India
- Language: Malayalam

Kudumbini is a 1964 Indian Malayalam-language film, directed and produced by P. A. Thomas. The film stars Prem Nazir, Sheela, Kaviyoor Ponnamma and Adoor Bhasi and features a musical score by L. P. R. Varma. It received a certificate of merit at the annual National Film Awards. It was remade in Kannada in 1966 as Premamayi.

== Cast ==
- Prem Nazir
- Sheela
- Kaviyoor Ponnamma
- Adoor Bhasi
- Thikkurissy Sukumaran Nair
- K. K. Aroor
- Muthukulam Raghavan Pillai
- Sreemoolanagaram Vijayan
- P. A. Thomas
- Meena

== Plot ==
Kaviyoor Ponnamma is married to Thikkurissy Sukumaran Nair, the eldest in a well to do family. The family is a joint family with Thikkurissi's younger brother Prem Nazir and a younger married sister Sharadha and their mother. Sharadha is the antagonist who tries her best to create misunderstanding between her family and the daughter in law of the family, Kaviyoor Ponnamma. Soon the misunderstandings are sorted and Prem Nazir falls in love with a feisty girl Janu (Sheela) and marries her. Janu turns out to be a mean spirited woman. Sharadha tries and succeeds in turning Janu against her elder sister in law. In the mix arrives the flamboyant son in law of the house, who is basically living off his wife's family. After some time of trying to get some money off his in laws, he is pressurized by the wife to take her to his place of work and residence. He is running a failing circus business with his girl friend. He is arrested for cheating his employees and Sharadha is left alone. Meanwhile, Janu drives out her brother in law and wife out of the house as the house is willed to her husband.

A despondent Sharadha goes back to her brothers home but Janu doesn't accept her. She goes to her elder brother's home and is received warmly. Soon Janu goes into labour and the midwife informs Prem Nazir that she needs medical help. Janu is rushed for a caesarean and her elder sister in law donates her blood to save her, dying in the process. Janu decides to bring up her sister in laws son as her own.

== Soundtrack ==
The music was composed by L. P. R. Varma and the lyrics were written by Abhayadev.

No.	Song	Singers	Lyrics	Length (m:ss)
1	"Ambilimaaman Pidicha"	K. J. Yesudas	Abhayadev	
2	"Enthelaam Kadhakal"	P. Leela	Abhayadev	
3	"Kanninu Kanninu"	Zero Babu	Abhayadev	
4	"Karayaathe Karayaathe"	P. Leela	Abhayadev	
5	"Olathil Thulli"	P. Leela	Abhayadev	
6	"Swapnathin Pushparadhathil"	K. J. Yesudas, P. Leela	Abhayadev	
7	"Vedanayellaamenikku"	P. Leela	Abhayadev	
8	"Veedinu Ponmani"	C. O. Anto	Abhayadev	
