= Police Ariyaruthe =

- Directed by: M. S. Senthil Kumar
- Screenplay by: N. Govindankutty
- Produced by: M. S. Senthil Kumar
- Starring: Madhu; K. P. Ummer; Rani Chandra; Ushanandini; Sudheer
- Cinematography: N. Karthikeyan
- Edited by: T. R. Natarajan
- Music by: V. Dakshinamoorthy
- Production company: Vetrivel Productions
- Distributed by: Vetrivel Productions
- Release date: 22 June 1973
- Country: India
- Language: Malayalam

Police Ariyaruthe is a 1973 Indian Malayalam-language film, directed and produced by M. S. Senthil Kumar. The film stars Madhu, K. P. Ummer, Rani Chandra and Sudheer. The film's score was composed by V. Dakshinamoorthy.

== Cast ==
- Madhu
- K. P. Ummer
- Rani Chandra
- Sudheer
- Ushanandini
- Sukumari
- O. Ramdas
- Mancheri Chandran
- Abbas (Old)
- N. Govindankutty
- Philomina

== Soundtrack ==
The music was composed by V. Dakshinamoorthy with lyrics by Mankombu Gopalakrishnan.

No.	Song	Singers	Lyrics	Length (m:ss)
1	"Aarodum Mindaathe"	S. Janaki	Mankombu Gopalakrishnan	
2	"Kaarirumbaani"	S. Janaki	Mankombu Gopalakrishnan	
