= Nizhalattam =

Indian film by A. Vincent

- Directed by: A. Vincent
- Written by: M. T. Vasudevan Nair
- Screenplay by: M. T. Vasudevan Nair
- Produced by: Hari Pothan
- Starring: Prem Nazir; Sheela; Sudheer; Kaviyoor Ponnamma; Thikkurissy Sukumaran Nair
- Cinematography: A. Venkat; Soorya Prakash
- Edited by: G. Venkittaraman
- Music by: G. Devarajan
- Production company: Supriya
- Distributed by: Supriya
- Release date: 31 July 1970
- Country: India
- Language: Malayalam

Nizhalattam (transl. Shadow play) is a 1970 Indian Malayalam-language drama film directed by A. Vincent and written by M. T. Vasudevan Nair and produced by Hari Pothan. The film stars Prem Nazir, Sheela, Sudheer, Kaviyoor Ponnamma and Thikkurissy Sukumaran Nair. The film marked the acting debut of Sudheer and Balan K. Nair. This is one of the few films in which Nazir played villain.

== Plot ==
Karunakaran is a shrewd and rich businessman who has amassed wealth mostly through unethical means. His wife pretends to be paralyzed and is bedridden. He has two sons Raveendran who is meek and Haridas who is principled and has left their home. After a visit to his concubine, Karunakaran dies of an apparent heart attack and Raveendran takes over the family's business.

Raveendran worships his dead father and starts spending money recklessly on alcohol, parties and women. He keeps his brother under his control and is surrounded by friends who keep exploiting him. His wife Shanta is the daughter of a school teacher and tries unsuccessfully to mend his ways. Their businesses start losing money and Raveendran goes on a downward spiral. Madhavi the servant of the house, leaves after Raveendran tries to molest her. As their business totally crumbles, all his supposed friends leave him and Raveendran becomes more reckless, ultimately killing their dog. Haridas is fed up, takes his mother and moves in with Madhavi, ultimately marrying her.

What happens to Raveendran and his family forms the rest of the story.

== Cast ==
- Prem Nazir as Ravi/Raveendran
- Sheela as Shantha
- Sudheer as Dasan/HariDasan
- Kaviyoor Ponnamma as Ravi's Mother
- Thikkurissy Sukumaran Nair as Karunakaran Muthalali
- Jose Prakash as Bhaskaran
- Kottayam Santha as Mrs. Nair
- Pattom Sadan as Music Conductor
- Sankaradi as Kumaran
- Jesey
- Nilambur Balan
- Abbas as Security Guard
- Bahadoor as Kurup
- Balan K. Nair as Balan
- M. Bhanumathi as Madhavi
- Metilda
- N. Govindankutty as Paul
- Nellikode Bhaskaran as Old Man
- P. R. Menon
- Paravoor Bharathan as Abraham
- R. K. Nair
- Thodupuzha Radhakrishnan
- Devika
- Kunchan
- Kedamangalam Ali
- Mohan
- R.K Nair
- Thapi Mohammed
- Sabu

== Soundtrack ==
The music was composed by G. Devarajan and the lyrics were written by Vayalar Ramavarma.

Song	Singers
"Chillaattam Parakkumee"	P. Madhuri
"Daaliyappookkale"	P. Susheela
"Devadaasiyalla Njan"	L. R. Eeswari
"Swargaputhri Navarathri"	K. J. Yesudas
"Yakshagaanam Muzhangi"	P. Susheela

== Box office ==
The film was commercial success.
