= Kuttavum Shikshayum =

Kuttavum Shikshayum may refer to these Indian films in Malayalam:

- Kuttavum Shikshayum (1976 film), a film by M. Masthan
- Kuttavum Shikshayum (2021 film), a film by Rajeev Ravi
