= Udyaanalakshmi =

- Directed by: K. S. Gopalakrishnan; Subash
- Written by: Pappanamkodu Lakshmanan
- Screenplay by: Pappanamkodu Lakshmanan
- Starring: Sudheer; Rani Chandra; KPAC Lalitha; Hari; Jose Prakash; Manju
- Cinematography: V. Karunakaran
- Edited by: N. Gopalakrishnan
- Music by: G. Devarajan
- Production company: Sreekumar Productions
- Distributed by: Sreekumar Productions
- Release date: 6 May 1976
- Country: India
- Language: Malayalam

Udyaanalakshmi is a 1976 Indian Malayalam film, directed by K. S. Gopalakrishnan. The film stars Sudheer, Rani Chandra, KPAC Lalitha, Hari, Jose Prakash and Manju in the lead roles. The film has musical score by G. Devarajan.

== Cast ==
- Sudheer
- Rani Chandra
- KPAC Lalitha
- Hari
- Jose Prakash
- Manju
- Mohan Sharma
- Ramachandran
- Sankaradi
- Shubha
- Vijayan
- Anandavally
- Bhargavi
- G. K. Pillai
- K. G. P. Menon
- Khadeeja
- Kuthiravattam Pappu
- Prabhavathi
- Sathyan
- Shekhar
- Soman Nair
- Vanchiyoor Madhavan Nair

== Soundtrack ==
The music was composed by G. Devarajan and the lyrics were written by Sreekumaran Thampi.

No.	Song	Singers	Lyrics	Length (m:ss)
1	"Aadi Lakshmi"	P. Jayachandran, Chorus	Sreekumaran Thampi	
2	"Devi Vigrahamo"	K. J. Yesudas, P. Madhuri	Sreekumaran Thampi	
3	"Naayakanaaru"	P. Madhuri	Sreekumaran Thampi	
4	"Raajayogam"	P. Madhuri	Sreekumaran Thampi	
5	"Thaatheyyam Thetti Moottil, Ezhunirangal"	P. Madhuri	Sreekumaran Thampi	
6	"Thulasimaala"	P. Madhuri	Sreekumaran Thampi	
