= Mohile =

Mohile is a surname. Notable people with the surname include:

- Amar Mohile, Indian film score composer
- Anil Mohile (1940–2012), Indian music composer and music arranger
- Supriya Gupta Mohile, American geriatric oncologist
- Shaila Mohile - Indian Playback Singer
