= Chief Guest =

1975 Indian Malayalam-language film

- Directed by: A. B. Raj
- Written by: T. K. Balachandran; Nagavally R. S. Kurup (dialogues)
- Screenplay by: Nagavally R. S. Kurup
- Produced by: T. K. Balachandran
- Starring: Prem Nazir; Jayabharathi; Adoor Bhasi; Muthukulam Raghavan Pillai
- Cinematography: P. B. Mani
- Edited by: K. Narayanan
- Music by: A. T. Ummer
- Production company: Teakebees
- Distributed by: Teakebees
- Release date: 3 January 1975
- Country: India
- Language: Malayalam

Chief Guest is a 1975 Indian Malayalam-language film directed by A. B. Raj and produced by T. K. Balachandran. The film stars Prem Nazir, Jayabharathi, Adoor Bhasi and Muthukulam Raghavan Pilleeiieeeorai in the lead roles. The film has musical score by A. T. Ummer.

== Cast ==
- Prem Nazir
- Jayabharathi
- Adoor Bhasi
- Muthukulam Raghavan Pillai
- Prema
- Sebastian
- Sreelatha Namboothiri
- T. R. Omana
- Karunakaran
- Vijayanand
- Mancheri Chandran]
- Paul Vengola
- A. Madhavan
- Alummoodan
- Aravindan
- Baby Sumathi
- Bahadoor
- Balaraj
- C. A. Balan
- Girija
- Joseph
- K. P. Ummer
- Kaduvakulam Antony
- Kunchan
- Kuttan Pillai
- Padma
- Prathapan
- Radhamani
- Reena
- T. P. Madhavan
- T. R. Radhakrishnan
- Thankan
- Treesa
- Unni Warrier
- Vanchiyoor Madhavan Nair
- Vijaya

== Soundtrack ==
The music was composed by A. T. Ummer.

No.	Song	Singers	Lyrics	Length (m:ss)
1	"Kanna Ninne"	Ambili	O. N. V. Kurup	
2	"Kavithayanu Nee"	K. J. Yesudas	O. N. V. Kurup	
3	"Madhumakshike"	S. Janaki	O. N. V. Kurup	
4	"Swarnapushpasharamulla"	K. J. Yesudas	O. N. V. Kurup	
5	"Thennithenni"	S. Janaki, Chorus	O. N. V. Kurup	
