= Yagaswam =

Yagashwam
- Directed by: Hariharan
- Written by: Hariharan
- Screenplay by: Hariharan
- Starring: Prem Nazir; Adoor Bhasi; Jose Prakash; Sankaradi
- Cinematography: T. N. Krishnankutty Nair
- Edited by: M. S. Mani
- Music by: G. Devarajan; M. S. Baburaj
- Production company: Hymavathy Movie Makers
- Distributed by: Hymavathy Movie Makers
- Release date: 21 December 1978
- Country: India
- Language: Malayalam

Yagashwam is a 1978 Indian Malayalam film, directed by Hariharan. The film stars Prem Nazir, Adoor Bhasi, Jose Prakash and Sankaradi in the lead roles. The film has musical score by G. Devarajan and M. S. Baburaj.

== Cast ==
- Prem Nazir as Unnikrishnan
- K. R. Vijaya as Sreedevi
- Vidhubala as Nandini
- K. P. Ummer as Balachandran
- Adoor Bhasi as Gopala Pilla
- Jose Prakash as Vishvanathan Pilla
- Sankaradi as Govinda Marar
- Sathaar as Appukuttan
- Janardanan as Vijayan
- Pattom Sadan as Narayanan
- Oduvil Unnikrishnan as Villager
- Meena as Ammalu
- Paravoor Bharathan as Kuttan Pilla
- Bhaskara Kuruppu as Kuruppu
- Priya as Reetha

== Soundtrack ==
The music was composed by G. Devarajan and M. S. Baburaj and the lyrics were written by Mankombu Gopalakrishnan and Yusufali Kechery.

| No. | Song | Singers | Lyrics | Length (m:ss) |
|---|---|---|---|---|
| 1 | "Krishnapriyadalam" | Vani Jairam | Mankombu Gopalakrishnan | |
| 2 | "Manichilanke Thuyilunaroo" | P. Susheela | Yusufali Kechery | |
| 3 | "Thrikkaakkare Theerthakkare" | P. Susheela | Mankombu Gopalakrishnan | |
| 4 | "Velicham" | K. J. Yesudas | Mankombu Gopalakrishnan | |
