= Poonthenaruvi =

- Directed by: J. Sasikumar
- Written by: Muttathu Varkey; Thoppil Bhasi (dialogues)
- Screenplay by: Thoppil Bhasi
- Produced by: C. C. Baby; V. M. Chandi
- Starring: Prem Nazir; Nanditha Bose; Vincent; Sudheer; Jayan; Jayabharathi
- Edited by: V. P. Krishnan
- Music by: M. K. Arjunan
- Production company: MS Productions
- Distributed by: MS Productions
- Release date: 10 November 1974
- Country: India
- Language: Malayalam

Poonthenaruvi is a 1974 Indian Malayalam-language film, directed by J. Sasikumar and produced by C. C. Baby and V. M. Chandi. The film stars Prem Nazir, Nanditha Bose, Vincent, Sudheer and Jayan. The music score is by M. K. Arjunan.

== Cast ==
- Prem Nazir as Ouseppachan
- Nanditha Bose as Valsamma (Dubbing: T. R. Omana)
- Jayabharathi as Rosily
- Vincent as Sunny
- Rani Chandra as Vimala
- Sudheer as Shaji
- Jayan as Dr. John
- Sukumari as Mariamma
- K. P. A. C. Lalitha as Kunjamma
- Adoor Bhasi as Ummachen
- Jose Prakash as Priest
- Sankaradi as Isaac
- Baby Sumathi as Valsamma's Childhood
- Bahadoor as Poovan
- Khadeeja as Anna
- Meena as Saramma
- Philomina as Achamma

== Soundtrack ==
The music was composed by M. K. Arjunan with lyrics by Sreekumaran Thampi.

No.	Song	Singers	Lyrics	Length (m:ss)
1	"Hridayathinoru Vaathil"	K. J. Yesudas	Sreekumaran Thampi	
2	"Kulirodi Kuliredi"	K. J. Yesudas	Sreekumaran Thampi	
3	"Nandyaarvattappoo"	P. Jayachandran	Sreekumaran Thampi	
4	"Oru Swapnathin Manchal"	K. J. Yesudas	Sreekumaran Thampi	
5	"Rambha Praveshamo"	K. J. Yesudas	Sreekumaran Thampi	
6	"Thankakkudame"	P. Jayachandran, P. Leela, Rajmohan	Sreekumaran Thampi	
7	"Vedana Thaanguvaan"	P. Madhuri	Sreekumaran Thampi	
