= Urvashi Bharathi =

1973 film by Thikkurissy Sukumaran Nair

- Poster
- Directed by: Thikkurissy Sukumaran Nair
- Written by: Thikkurissy Sukumaran Nair
- Produced by: Ramachandran
- Starring: Prem Nazir; Jayabharathi; Sudheer vincent Raghavan
- Music by: V. Dakshinamoorthy
- Production company: Murali Movies
- Distributed by: Murali Movies
- Release date: 3 August 1973
- Country: India
- Language: Malayalam

Urvashi Bharathi is a 1973 Indian Malayalam-language film, directed by Thikkurissy Sukumaran Nair and produced by Ramachandran. The film stars Prem Nazir, Jayabharathi, Sudheer and Adoor Bhasi. The film had musical score by V. Dakshinamoorthy. and story A.V. Francis.

== Cast ==
- Prem Nazir
- Sudheer
- Vincent
- Raghavan
- Adoor Bhasi
- Thikkurissy Sukumaran Nair
- T. S. Muthaiah
- Paul Vengola
- Bahadoor
- Kaduvakulam Antony
- Pattom Sadan
- N. Govindankutty
- Paravoor Bharathan
- Innocent
- Jayabharathi
- Meena
- Sadhana

== Soundtrack ==
The music was composed by V. Dakshinamoorthy and the lyrics were written by Thikkurissy Sukumaran Nair.

No.	Song	Singers	Lyrics	Length (m:ss)
1	"Enthu Venam"	K. J. Yesudas	Thikkurissy Sukumaran Nair	
2	"Kaarkoonthal Kettilenthinu"	K. J. Yesudas	Thikkurissy Sukumaran Nair	
3	"Nisheedhini Nisheedhini"	K. J. Yesudas	Thikkurissy Sukumaran Nair	
4	"Onnichu Kalichu Valarnnu"	P. Leela	Thikkurissy Sukumaran Nair	
5	"Penninenthorazhaku"	L. R. Eeswari	Thikkurissy Sukumaran Nair	
6	"Thullithulli Nadakkunna"	P. Jayachandran, B. Vasantha	Thikkurissy Sukumaran Nair	
7	"Udyaanapaalaka"	P. Susheela	Thikkurissy Sukumaran Nair	
