= Sooryakanthi =

- Directed by: Baby
- Written by: Vijayan; Surasu (dialogues)
- Screenplay by: Surasu
- Starring: Sukumaran; Sudheer; M. G. Soman; Mallika Sukumaran; Kuthiravattam Pappu
- Cinematography: P. S. Nivas
- Edited by: K. Sankunni
- Music by: Jaya Vijaya
- Production company: Rajpriya Pictures
- Distributed by: Rajpriya Pictures
- Release date: 9 December 1977
- Country: India
- Language: Malayalam

Sooryakanthi is a 1977 Indian Malayalam film, directed by Baby. Screenplay and story are by Surasu. The film stars Sukumaran, Sudheer, Kuthiravattam Pappu, M. G. Soman and Mallika Sukumaran in the lead roles. The film has musical score by Jaya Vijaya.

== Cast ==
- Sukumaran
- M. G. Soman
- Sudheer
- Kuthiravattam Pappu
- Mallika Sukumaran

== Soundtrack ==
The music was composed by Jaya Vijaya and the lyrics were written by Poovachal Khader and Dr. Pavithran.

No.	Song	Singers	Lyrics	Length (m:ss)
1	"Karaye Nokki"	K. J. Yesudas	Poovachal Khader	
2	"Maanathaare"	S. Janaki, P. Jayachandran	Dr. Pavithran	
3	"Paalaazhithira"	P. Jayachandran	Dr. Pavithran	
4	"Shilaayugam Muthal"	K. J. Yesudas	Poovachal Khader	
