= Soundaryapooja =

- Directed by: B. K. Pottekkad
- Written by: Parasala Divakaran
- Screenplay by: Parasala Divakaran
- Starring: Madhu; Jayabharathi; Rani Chandra; Adoor Bhasi
- Cinematography: C. Ramachandra Menon
- Edited by: Ravi
- Music by: M. S. Baburaj
- Production company: Muthappan Movies
- Distributed by: Muthappan Movies
- Release date: 20 July 1973
- Country: India
- Language: Malayalam

Soundaryapooja is a 1973 Indian Malayalam film, directed by B. K. Pottekkad. The film stars Madhu, Jayabharathi, Rani Chandra and Adoor Bhasi in the lead roles. The film had musical score by M. S. Baburaj.

== Cast ==
- Madhu
- Jayabharathi
- Rani Chandra
- Adoor Bhasi
- Sreelatha Namboothiri
- T. R. Omana
- Bahadoor
- Balan K. Nair
- Radhamani

== Soundtrack ==
The music was composed by M. S. Baburaj and the lyrics were written by Mankombu Gopalakrishnan and Sreekumaran Thampi.

No.	Song	Singers	Lyrics	Length (m:ss)
1	"Aapaadachoodam Panineeru"	K. J. Yesudas	Mankombu Gopalakrishnan	
2	"Ambalakkunnile"	P. Susheela	Mankombu Gopalakrishnan	
3	"Asthamayachakravaalam"	K. J. Yesudas	Sreekumaran Thampi	
4	"Hridayam Maya"	S. Janaki	Sreekumaran Thampi	
5	"Kaarthikathirunnaal"	P. Susheela	Mankombu Gopalakrishnan	
