= Yatheem =

- Directed by: M. Krishnan Nair
- Written by: Moidu Padiyath
- Produced by: T. E. Vasudevan
- Starring: Sheela; K. P. Ummer; Sudheer; Vidhubala; Adoor Bhasi; Thikkurissy Sukumaran Nair; Kottayam Santha
- Cinematography: N.Karthikeyan
- Music by: M. S. Baburaj; P. Bhaskaran (lyrics)
- Production company: Jaijaya Combines
- Distributed by: Jaya Maruthi
- Release date: 14 September 1977
- Country: India
- Language: Malayalam

Yatheem (transl. Orphan) is a 1977 Indian Malayalam-language film, scripted by Moidu Padiyath, directed by M. Krishnan Nair and produced by T. E. Vasudevan. The film stars Sheela, K. P. Ummer, Sudheer, Vidhubala, Adoor Bhasi, Thikkurissy Sukumaran Nair and Kottayam Santha. It features a musical score by M. S. Baburaj.

== Cast ==
- Sheela
- K. P. Ummer
- Sudheer
- Vidhubala as Zainaba
- Ravikumar as Siddhique
- Sathaar as Azees
- Unnimary
- Bahadoor
- Adoor Bhasi
- Thikkurissy Sukumaran Nair
- Kottayam Santha
- Prameela
- Sankaradi
- Sreemoolanagaram Vijayan
- Nilambur Balan
- Khadeeja
- Kunjava
- Nellikode Bhaskaran as Sakkath Mammad
- Pala Thankam
- Paravoor Bharathan as Hameed
- Philomina
- Santha Devi
- Vanchiyoor Radha

== Soundtrack ==
The music was composed by MS Baburaj and the lyrics were written by P. Bhaskaran.

No.	Song	Singers	Lyrics	Length (m:ss)
1	"Allaavin Kaarunyamillenkil"	K. J. Yesudas	P. Bhaskaran	
2	"Innukaanum Ponkinakkal"	Ambili	P. Bhaskaran	
3	"Maanathu Sandhya"	S. Janaki, Chorus	P. Bhaskaran	
4	"Manippiraave Ninte Kalithozhaninnu"	Vani Jairam, L. R. Eeswari	P. Bhaskaran	
5	"Neelamegha Maalikayil"	P. Jayachandran	P. Bhaskaran	
6	"Pandu Pandoru Paadusha"	P. Susheela	P. Bhaskaran	
7	"Pandu Pandoru Paadusha" (Bit)	P. Susheela	P. Bhaskaran	
8	"Thankavarnappattudutha"	L. R. Eeswari, Chorus	P. Bhaskaran	
