= Kuttikkuppayam =

1964 Indian film

- Directed by: M. Krishnan Nair
- Written by: Moidu Padiyath
- Based on: Kaneer Panthal by Moidu Padiyath
- Produced by: T. E. Vasudevan nair
- Starring: Prem Nazir; Madhu; Sheela; Adoor Bhasi
- Cinematography: C. J. Mohan
- Edited by: T. R. Sreenivasalu
- Music by: M. S. Baburaj
- Production company: Jaya Maruthi
- Distributed by: Jaya Maruthi
- Release date: 22 February 1964
- Country: India
- Language: Malayalam

Kuttikkuppayam (transl. Short dress) is a 1964 Indian Malayalam-language drama film directed by M. Krishnan Nair and written by Moidu Padiyath based on his novel Kaneer Panthal. The film was a major commercial success at the box office that year and also had a successful soundtrack composed by M. S. Baburaj.

== Plot ==
Jabbar marries Zubaida against the wish of his mother, who had plans to bring her niece Safia as her son's bride. Zubaida is accused of being infertile by her mother-in-law and other members of the family.

Jabbar loves his wife, but gradually falls to the constant taunts, manipulations and emotional blackmailing over not having a child and blames his wife for that. Jabbar finally decides to separate from his wife.

Jabbar marries Safia, while Zubaida's father Kareem forces his daughter to marry Siddique. The marriage broker does not tell Siddique that Zubaida had married earlier. When he learns of this, he sends Zubaida back home. After Kareem dies, Siddique brings back Zubaida and they leave for Madras where Siddique gets a job.

Zubaida gives birth to a child. Jabbar is surprised to hear of this from a relative. He gathers courage and undergoes a medical examination that confirms that he is infertile. At the same time, Safia becomes pregnant. His own cousin is held responsible for this.

Jabbar reaches Madras in search of Zubaida and Siddique and meets them at a festival ground. Zubaida's child was on a merry go round. Suddenly the machine goes out of control. Jabbar jumps in to save the life of Zubaida's child, but is fatally injured. Jabbar breathes his last in the presence of Zubaida.

== Cast ==
- Prem Nazir
- Madhu
- Sheela
- Adoor Bhasi
- Ambika
- Murali
- Nilambur Ayisha
- Philomina
- Santha Devi

== Soundtrack ==
All lyrics are written by P. Bhaskaran; all music is composed by Baburaj.

No.	Title	Artist(s)	Length
1.	"Innente Karalile"	P. Leela
2.	"Kalyaana Rathriyil"	P. Leela
3.	"Naadum Nagaravum" (Bit)	Baburaj
4.	"Oru Kotta"	L. R. Eswari, Choir
5.	"Pon Valayillenkilum"	K. P. Udayabhanu
6.	"Pottichirikkuvaan"	P. Leela, Gomathy, Uthaman
7.	"Pullimanalla"	L. R. Eswari, Choir
8.	"Thottilil Ninnu Thudakkam"	P. B. Sreenivas
9.	"Ummaakkum Bappaakkum"	L. R. Eswari
10.	"Velukkumbol"	A. P. Komala
11.	"Virunnu Varum"	P. Leela, Uthaman

== Trivia ==
This was the debut film of Philomina. This was also the debut Malayalam film of playback singer L. R. Eswari.
