= Manithali =

- Poster
- Directed by: M. Krishnan Nair
- Written by: Moidu Padiyath
- Produced by: T. E. Vasudevan
- Starring: Prem Nazir; Mammootty; Seema; Unnimary; Balan K. Nair
- Music by: A. T. Ummer
- Production company: Jaijaya Combines
- Distributed by: Chalachitra
- Release date: 18 February 1984
- Country: India
- Language: Malayalam

Manithali is a 1984 Indian Malayalam film, scripted by Moidu Padiyath directed by M. Krishnan Nair and produced by T. E. Vasudevan. The film stars Prem Nazir, Mammootty, Unnimary and Balan K. Nair in the lead roles. The film has musical score by A. T. Ummer.

== Plot ==
Zulfikar and Ramlath are happily married. Zulfikar's family disapproves of his marriage while his father-in-law Judgal Abu is not happy about Zulfikar not providing him with handouts.

Judgal Abu meets Kunjumuhammed, a divorced rich man returning to the village and hatches a scheme in hope of getting money from Kunjumuhammed. He manages to create a misunderstanding between Zulfikar and Ramlath. He forces Zulfikar to divorce Ramlath. A disappointed Zulfikar runs away from the village. Judgal Abu forces Ramlath to marry Kunjumuhammed.

On their wedding night, Ramlath reveals to Kunjumuhammed that she is pregnant with Zulfikar's child. Kunjumuhammed, though disappointed, promises Ramlath that he will bring back Zulfikar.

== Cast ==
- Prem Nazir as Kunjumuhammed
- Mammootty as Zulfikar
- Seema as Ramlath
- Unnimary as Sajna
- Balan K. Nair as Dajjal Abu
- Bahadoor as Kunjanikka (Marriage Consultant)
- Mala Aravindan as Subaid (Man servant)
- Paul Vengola
- Shubha as Mariyamma
- Sankaradi as Musthafakka (Restaurant owner)
- Adoor Bhasi as Abdullakunji (Zulfikar's father)
- Kunchan as Kili
- Jose Prakash
- Kaviyoor Ponnamma as Zulfikar's mother
- Adoor Bhavani as Chenachi Umma (Maid servant)

== Soundtrack ==
The music was composed by A. T. Ummer and the lyrics were written by P. Bhaskaran.

No.	Song	Singers	Lyrics	Length (m:ss)
1	"Karimbennu Karuthi"	K. J. Yesudas, Ambili	P. Bhaskaran	
2	"Moncherum Poovani"	Vani Jairam	P. Bhaskaran	
3	"Unnikalkkulsavamela"	K. J. Yesudas	P. Bhaskaran	
4	"Vinnilum Mannilum"	Vani Jairam	P. Bhaskaran	
5	"Yaa Habbi"	K. J. Yesudas, Jolly Abraham, Kannur Salim	P. Bhaskaran	
