= Rajalakshmi Jayaram =

Indian actress (died 2021)

- Died: 18 October 2021 (aged 82); Kottayam, Attingal, Kerala, India
- Occupation: Actress
- Spouse: D Jayaram
- Children: C. J. Rajeshkumar, C. J. Girishkumar

Rajalakshmi Jayaram was an Indian Cine- Theatre actress who acted prominently in Malayalam films.

== Filmography ==
The first movie of Rajalakshmi is Bhoomiyile Malakha as heroine and Prem Nazir is the hero of the film. She has acted also in Kaliyodam and Mayavi Malayalam movies

== Personal life ==
Rajalakshmi was the heroine of all the major plays of Deshabhimani Theaters. Rajalakshmi married late D Jayaram, the former chairman of Attingal Municipal Council. After the marriage she left acting. They have two sons, Adv. C. J. Rajeshkumar, the former chairman of Attingal Municipal Council and C. J. Girishkumar.

== Death ==
Rajalakshmi died in her 82nd year on 18 October 2021.
