= Vivaham Swargathil =

- Directed by: J. D. Thottan
- Written by: K. T. Muhammad
- Produced by: P. A. Muhammad Kasim
- Starring: Prem Nazir; Sheela; Thikkurissy Sukumaran Nair; Prema
- Music by: M. S. Baburaj
- Production company: Sony Pictures
- Distributed by: Sony Pictures
- Release date: 28 October 1970
- Country: India
- Language: Malayalam

Vivaham Swargathil (lit. 'Marriage in heaven') is a 1970 Indian Malayalam-language film, directed by J. D. Thottan and produced by P. A. Muhammad Kasim. The film stars Prem Nazir, Sheela, Thikkurissy Sukumaran Nair and Prema, and features music composed by M. S. Baburaj.

== Cast ==
- Prem Nazir
- Sheela
- Thikkurissy Sukumaran Nair
- Prema
- T. S. Muthaiah
- Adoor Bhavani
- Kaduvakulam Antony
- K. S. Parvathy
- Rani Chandra
- T. K. Balachandran
- Vijayanirmala

== Soundtrack ==
The music was composed by M. S. Baburaj and the lyrics were written by Vayalar Ramavarma.

No.	Song	Singers	Lyrics	Length (m:ss)
1	"Chumbikkaanoru"	S. Janaki	Vayalar Ramavarma	
2	"Murukkaan Chellam Thuranna"	P. Susheela	Vayalar Ramavarma	
3	"Pravaachakanmaar"	K. J. Yesudas	Vayalar Ramavarma	
4	"Pravaahini Pravaahini"	K. J. Yesudas	Vayalar Ramavarma	
