= Porter Kunjali =

- Directed by: P. A. Thomas; J. Sasikumar
- Written by: N. N. Pillai
- Screenplay by: J. Sasikumar
- Produced by: P. A. Thomas
- Starring: Prem Nazir; Sheela; Adoor Bhasi; Muthukulam Raghavan Pillai
- Cinematography: P. B. Maniyam
- Edited by: K. D. George
- Music by: M. S. Baburaj
- Production company: Thomas Pictures
- Distributed by: Thomas Pictures
- Release date: 9 April 1965
- Country: India
- Language: Malayalam

Porter Kunjali is a 1965 Indian Malayalam-language film, directed and produced by P. A. Thomas. The film stars Prem Nazir, Sheela, Adoor Bhasi and Muthukulam Raghavan Pillai. The film's score was composed by M. S. Baburaj.

== Plot ==
A hardworking porter named Kunjali joins the military for World War II. He leaves his family and livelihood in the care of his foster son, Kochuraman. Kochuraman betrays this trust, steals Kunjali's belongings, and uses them to become a corrupt, wealthy businessman. While Kunjali is away, a kind man named Pareed steps up to support Kunjali's struggling family. He hopes to marry Kunjali’s daughter, Amina, who is secretly in love with their neighbor, Doctor Sali.

== Cast ==
- Prem Nazir as Doctor Sali
- Sheela as Amina
- Adoor Bhasi as Mollakka
- Muthukulam Raghavan Pillai as Keshavan Pillai
- O. Ramdas
- T. R. Omana AS Kunjipathumma
- P. A. Thomas as Kochuraman
- T. S. Muthaiah as Kunjali
- Annie as Dr. Bhanumathi
- Bahadoor as Pareed
- Meena as Vanithasamajam member
- V.S. Achari
- Geetha as Janamma
- Chandni as Madavi
- Suprabha
- Thankam

== Soundtrack ==
The music was composed by M. S. Baburaj with lyrics by Abhayadev and Sreemoolanagaram Vijayan.

No.	Song	Singers	Lyrics	Length (m:ss)
1	"Jannathu Thaamara"	P. Leela	Abhayadev	
2	"Katturumbinte Kaathukuthinu"	A. P. Komala	Abhayadev	
3	"Odippokum Kaatte"	P. Leela, P. B. Sreenivas	Abhayadev	
4	"Paadaam Paadaam Thakarum"	S. Janaki	Abhayadev	
5	"Pinneyumozhukunnu" (Bit)	P. B. Sreenivas	Abhayadev	
6	"Poovaniyukilliniyum"	P. B. Sreenivas	Abhayadev	
7	"Vandikkaran Beeran"	Zero Babu	Sreemoolanagaram Vijayan	
