= Moidu Padiyath =

Indian novelist, writer, director (1931–1989)

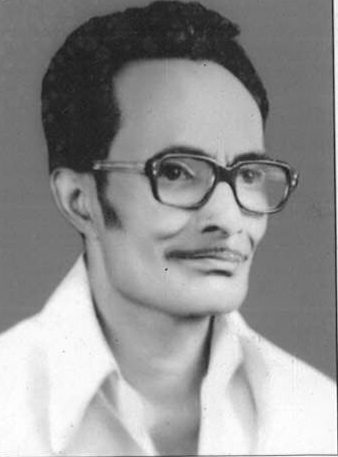
- At age 50
- Born: 28 May 1931; Eriyad, Kodungallur, Kerala
- Died: 11 January 1989 (aged 57)
- Occupations: Writer, screenplay writer, novelist
- Spouse: khadeeja Moidu
- Children: 5
- Parent(s): Mohammed Haji Padiyath and Fathima Valiyaveettil
- Relatives: Kamal

Moidu Padiyath or Moithu Padiyathu (28 May 1931 – 11 January 1989) was an Indian novelist, screenplay writer, and director in Mollywood.

== Early life ==
Padiyath was born in 1931, in the coastal village Eriyad, near Kodungallur town, Trichur district, Kerala.

== Career ==
Padiyath narrated stories from his own family history, covering subjects such as his Muslim family's backward caste, family subjects such as biased performance, harassment between mothers-in-law, daughters-in-law, sisters-in-law, divorce, multiple spouses, etc.

He gained entry into the cinema through the veteran director Kunchacko under the banner of Udaya Studio for whom he produced his controversial novel Umma. He furnished dozen of novels rewritten as screenplays such as Kuttikkuppayam, Kuppivala, Yatheem, Mylanji, Manithali, Maniyara and Kaalam Maari Kadha Maari, most of which gained commercial success. He directed a movie entitled Allahu Akbar.

His son Siddique Shameer followed in the same field. Veteran film director Kamal and actor Bahadoor are Padiyath's relatives.

Padiyath is said in the Encyclopaedia of Indian Literature to have written for "the ordinary reader". He is described in A History of Malayalam Literature as "extraordinarily prolific".

Padiyath died on 11 January 1989, at the age of 57.

== Works ==
- The Cuckoo That Yearned to Sing (1958)
