= Anchu Sundarikal =

- Directed by: M. Krishnan Nair
- Written by: Jagathy N. K. Achari
- Screenplay by: Jagathy N. K. Achari
- Produced by: Kasim
- Starring: Prem Nazir; Jayabharathi; Adoor Bhasi; Pappukutty Bhagavathar
- Music by: M. S. Baburaj
- Production company: Sony Pictures
- Distributed by: Sony Pictures
- Release date: 11 October 1968
- Country: India
- Language: Malayalam

Anchu Sundarikal is a 1968 Indian Malayalam-language film, directed by M. Krishnan Nair and produced by Kasim. The film stars Prem Nazir, Jayabharathi, Adoor Bhasi and Pappukutty Bhagavathar. The film had musical score by M. S. Baburaj.

== Cast ==
- Prem Nazir
- Jayabharathi
- Adoor Bhasi
- Pappukutty Bhagavathar
- T. S. Muthaiah
- G. K. Pillai
- Pankajavalli
- Paravoor Bharathan
- Rani Chandra
- Udaya Chandrika

== Soundtrack ==
The music was composed by M. S. Baburaj and the lyrics were written by Yusufali Kechery.

No.	Song	Singers	Lyrics	Length (m:ss)
1	"Amrithum Thenum"	K. J. Yesudas	Yusufali Kechery	
2	"Anju Sundarikal"	K. J. Yesudas	Yusufali Kechery	
3	"Maayaajaalacheppinullile"	K. J. Yesudas	Yusufali Kechery	
4	"Paattupadi"	P. Susheela	Yusufali Kechery	
5	"Pathinezhilethiya"	S. Janaki	Yusufali Kechery	
6	"Sindooracheppilum Kandilla"	K. J. Yesudas	Yusufali Kechery	
