= Radha Enna Pennkutti =

Radha Enna Penkutti
- Directed by: Balachandra Menon
- Written by: Balachandra Menon
- Screenplay by: Balachandra Menon
- Produced by: Krishnaswami Reddiar
- Starring: Sankaradi; Sukumaran; Baby Sumathi; Jalaja
- Cinematography: Divakara Menon
- Edited by: A. Sukumaran
- Music by: Shyam
- Production company: Sreelekshmipriya Productions
- Distributed by: Sreelekshmipriya Productions
- Release date: 4 May 1979
- Country: India
- Language: Malayalam

Radha Enna Penkutti is a 1979 Indian Malayalam film, directed by Balachandra Menon and produced by Krishnaswami Reddiar. The film stars Sankaradi, Sukumaran, Baby Sumathi and Jalaja in the lead roles. The film has musical score by Shyam.

== Cast ==
- Sankaradi
- Sukumaran
- Baby Sumathi
- Jalaja
- Ravi Menon
- Vidhubala

== Soundtrack ==
The music was composed by Shyam.

No.	Song	Singers	Lyrics	Length (m:ss)
1	"Irulala Churulu Nivarthum"	S. Janaki	Devadas	
2	"Kaattukurinjipoovu"	P. Jayachandran	Devadas	
3	"Moham Daaham"	Vani Jairam, Chorus	Devadas	
4	"Varnaradhangalil"	P. Jayachandran	Devadas	
