= Sarpakadu =

- Directed by: J. D. Thottan
- Written by: K. V. R. Acharya; Muthukulam Raghavan Pillai (dialogues)
- Screenplay by: P. K. Sathyapal
- Produced by: P. K. Sathyapal
- Starring: Madhu; Sukumari; Ambika; Adoor Bhasi
- Cinematography: P. K. Madhavan Nair
- Edited by: K. Narayanan; G. Venkittaraman
- Music by: M. S. Baburaj
- Production company: Naga Films
- Release date: 31 December 1965
- Country: India
- Language: Malayalam

Sarpakadu (transl. Grove of snakes) is a 1965 Indian Malayalam-language film, directed by J. D. Thottan and produced by P. K. Sathyapal. The film stars Madhu, Sukumari, Ambika and Adoor Bhasi. It was released on 31 December 1965.

== Plot ==
Dr. Krishnan and his son Dr. Balan are dedicated to eradicating death by snakebite. They go on a mission to the dense forests surrounding the mountain ranges in search of the Thanka Sarpam or the Golden Snake, believed to be the most poisonous in the world. Their intention is to conduct research based on its venom and perhaps invent an anti-venom that would be a remedy for all snakebites. Their compounder also accompanies them. They stay in the forest guesthouse and the watcher there, Raghavan Pilllai, guides them in their search. But their efforts fail. Balan falls in love with Nagaprabha, the elder daughter of Swami, a hermit who lives in the forests along with his daughters and engaged in worshipping his family deity Nagamma, the Snake Goddess. The compounder falls in love with the younger daughter Nagalatha. One day, Balan and the compounder reach Swami's hermitage and see the Thanka Sarpam on the idol of Nagamma inside the cave temple. Balan and his father request Swami to hand over the Thanka Sarpam to them and offer a huge sum of money. Swami becomes furious and drives them away. Meanwhile, Nagalatha is attacked by a bear and Krishnan's attempts to save her fail. Swami is shocked when he learns on his return to the hermitage that the Thanka Sarpam was stolen by Balan while he was away. Swami reaches the guesthouse and begins playing the makudi (snake charmer's flute). The Thanka Sarpam leaves the pouch in which it was tied up. Swami forces the snake to bite Balan and Krishnan is unable to save him. Nagaprabha begs her father to save the life of her beloved. Swami accedes to the request. He plays the makudi, the snake sucks out the venom, and fatally strikes it head on the floor. Balan is saved. Kari Nagam or the Mountain Cobra believed to be the companion of the Thanka Sarpam reaches there and bites Swami. Krishnan shoots the snake to death. Before dying Swami wishes Krishnan success in inventing the anti-venom but also requests him to respect snake worship, not to kill snakes, and to honour the traditional methods of treatment for snakebite.

== Cast ==
- Madhu as Balachandran
- Sukumari as Nagalatha, Nagaprabha's sister
- Ambika as Nagaprabha
- Adoor Bhasi as Compounder Unni
- Muthukulam Raghavan Pillai as Watchman Raghavan Pilla
- Kottarakkara Sreedharan Nair as Temple Priest
- Kottayam Chellappan as Doctor

== Soundtrack ==
The music was composed by M. S. Baburaj and the lyrics were written by Abhayadev.

Song	Singers
"Aashanabhassil"	K. J. Yesudas, P. Leela
"Innale Njanoru"	P. Leela
"Koodappirappe Nee"	P. Leela
"Malamakal"	P. Leela, A. P. Komala
"Nanma Cheyyanam"	P. Leela, Kamukara, A. P. Komala
"Sringaara Lahari"	Kamukara, M. S. Baburaj
