= Njan Ninne Premikkunnu =

- Theatrical release poster
- Directed by: K. S. Gopalakrishnan
- Screenplay by: R. C. Santhi; Surasu (dialogues)
- Story by: V. K. Kumar
- Produced by: Vishnu; Vazhunnavar
- Starring: Kamal Haasan; Janardhanan; Sudheer; Murali Sr; Ushakumari
- Cinematography: J. Williams
- Edited by: A. Ramesan
- Music by: M. S. Baburaj
- Production company: Devi Prabha Arts
- Distributed by: Devi Prabha Arts
- Release date: 25 July 1975
- Country: India
- Language: Malayalam

Njan Ninne Premikkunnu (transl. I Love You) is a 1975 Indian Malayalam-language film, directed by K. S. Gopalakrishnan. The film stars Kamal Haasan, Ushakumari, Sudheer, Girija, Janardhanan and Murali Sr. The film has musical score by M. S. Baburaj. The film dubbed Tamil language as Muradan.

== Cast ==
- Kamal Haasan as Suresh
- Ushakumari (Vennira Aadai Nirmala) as Gracy
- Sudheer
- Girija
- Janardhanan as John
- Murali

== Production ==
Njan Ninne Premikkunnu film produced by Vishnu and Vazhunnavar under production banner Devi Prabha Arts. It was given an "U" (Unrestricted) certificate by the Central Board of Film Certification. The final length of the film was 3,831.04 metres (12,569.0 ft).

== Soundtrack ==
The music was composed by M. S. Baburaj with lyrics by P. Bhaskaran and Bichu Thirumala.

No.	Song	Singers	Lyrics	Length (m:ss)
1	"Aakaashathinu Mounam"	K. J. Yesudas	P. Bhaskaran	
2	"Dhoomam Dhoomaananda"	Bichu Thirumala, Ambili, K. P. Brahmanandan, Kamal Haasan	Bichu Thirumala	
3	"Manasse Ashwasikkoo"	S. Janaki	Bichu Thirumala	
4	"Vasantham Maranjappol"	K. J. Yesudas, L. R. Anjali	P. Bhaskaran	
