= Manikyakottaram =

- Directed by: U. Rajagopal
- Written by: M. M. Ebrahimkutty
- Screenplay by: M. M. Ebrahimkutty
- Produced by: H. H. Abdulla Settu
- Starring: Madhu; Sharada; Kamalam; P. K. Sathyapal
- Cinematography: U. Rajagopal
- Music by: M. S. Baburaj
- Production company: Rubeena Films
- Distributed by: Rubeena Films
- Release date: 21 January 1966
- Country: India
- Language: Malayalam

Manikyakottaram is a 1966 Indian Malayalam film, directed by U. Rajagopal and produced by H. H. Abdulla Settu. The film stars Madhu, Sharada, Kamalam and P. K. Sathyapal in the lead roles. The film had musical score by M. S. Baburaj.

== Cast ==
- Madhu
- Sharada
- Kamalam
- P. K. Sathyapal
- Baby Padmini
- Bahadoor
- K. P. Ummer
- Nellikode Bhaskaran
- Philomina
- Suprabha

== Soundtrack ==
The music was composed by M. S. Baburaj and the lyrics were written by Kaniyapuram Ramachandran.

| No. | Song | Singers | Lyrics | Length (m:ss) |
|---|---|---|---|---|
| 1 | "Kallante Peru" | S. Janaki | Kaniyapuram Ramachandran | |
| 2 | "Manassinte Malarani" | K. J. Yesudas | Kaniyapuram Ramachandran | |
| 3 | "Nakshathrappunnukal Aayiram" | Kozhikode Abdul Khader | Kaniyapuram Ramachandran | |
| 4 | "Pachamarakkaadukale" | K. J. Yesudas | Kaniyapuram Ramachandran | |
| 5 | "Pennu Kelkkaan" | L. R. Eeswari | Kaniyapuram Ramachandran | |
