= Bhrashtu =

1978 film

- Directed by: Thriprayar Sukumaran
- Written by: Madambu Kunjukuttan; M. R. Joseph (dialogues)
- Screenplay by: M. R. Joseph
- Produced by: T. K. Baburajan
- Starring: Sukumaran; Kuthiravattam Pappu; MS Namboothiri; Paravoor Bharathan
- Cinematography: R. M. Kasthoori (Moorthy)
- Edited by: Ravi
- Music by: M. S. Baburaj
- Production company: Ragachira
- Distributed by: Ragachira
- Release date: 19 October 1978
- Country: India
- Language: Malayalam

Bhrashtu is a 1978 Indian Malayalam film, directed by Thriprayar Sukumaran and produced by T. K. Baburajan. The film stars Sukumaran, Kuthiravattam Pappu, M. S. Namboothiri and Paravoor Bharathan in the lead roles. The film has musical score by M. S. Baburaj.

== Cast ==
- Sukumaran
- Kuthiravattam Pappu
- M. S. Namboothiri
- Paravoor Bharathan
- Ravi Menon
- Reena
- Sreekala
- Sujatha
- Gemini Ganesan

== Soundtrack ==
The music was composed by M. S. Baburaj and the lyrics were written by Naattika Sivaram.

No.	Song	Singers	Lyrics	Length (m:ss)
1	"Bhrashtu Bhrashtu"	K. J. Yesudas	Naattika Sivaram	
2	"Neeyevide Kanna"	S. Janaki	Naattika Sivaram	
3	"Thechi Poothe"	Vani Jairam, Chorus	Naattika Sivaram	
4	"Veli Kazhinja"	S. Janaki	Naattika Sivaram	
