= Allahu Akbar (1977 film) =

- Poster
- Directed by: Moidu Padiyath
- Written by: Moidu Padiyath
- Starring: Jayabharathi; Jesey; Vincent; K. P. Ummer
- Music by: M. S. Baburaj
- Production company: Hashim Production
- Distributed by: Hashim Production
- Release date: 4 February 1977
- Country: India
- Language: Malayalam

Allahu Akbar (transl. God is the greatest) is a 1977 Indian Malayalam-language film, directed by Moidu Padiyath, who is better known for being a novelist, and Mollywood screenplay writer. The film stars Jayabharathi, Jeassy and Vincent in the lead roles. The film has musical score by M. S. Baburaj.

== Cast ==
- Jayabharathi
- Ambika old
- Jeassy
- Vincent
- K. P. Ummer
- Raghavan
- Bahadoor
- Jose Prakash
- Prema
- Kunhava

== Soundtrack ==
The music was composed by M. S. Baburaj and the lyrics were written by P. Bhaskaran.

| No. | Song | Singers | Lyrics | Length (m:ss) |
|---|---|---|---|---|
| 1 | "Aadithya Chandranmaare" | C. O. Anto | P. Bhaskaran | |
| 2 | "Ambilikkaarayilunniyappam" | S. Janaki | P. Bhaskaran | |
| 3 | "Arabikkadhayile Raajakumari" | K. J. Yesudas, B. Vasantha | P. Bhaskaran | |
| 4 | "Pathinezhaam Vayassinte" | L. R. Eeswari | P. Bhaskaran | |
