= Supriya =

Supriya is a feminine given name.

== People ==
Notable people with this name include the following

- Supriya Aiman (born 1991) Indian actress
- Supriya Chaudhuri, Indian scholar
- Supriya Devi (Supriya Choudhury; 1933 – 2018), Indian actress
- Supriya Ganesh (born 1997), American actress
- Supriya Jatav (born 1991), Indian karateka
- Supriya Karnik (fl. 1994 – present) Indian actress
- Supriya Lohith, Indian singer
- Supriya Maskey (born 2000), Nepalese beauty queen
- Supriya Gupta Mohile, American geriatric oncologist
- Supriya Mondal (born 1997), Indian swimmer
- Supriya Pathak (born 1961), Indian actress
- Supriya Pathare (born 1972), Indian actress
- Supriya Pilgaonkar, known by her screen name Supriya (born 1967), Indian actress
- Supriya Routray (born 1990), Indian footballer
- Supriya Sahu (born 1968), Indian bureaucrat
- Supriya Shukla (born Supriya Raina), Indian actress
- Supriya Sule (born 1969), Indian politician

=== Fictional ===
- Supriya, a character depicted as the second wife of Karna in some novels.
