= Sakhakkale Munnoottu =

- Directed by: J. Sasikumar
- Written by: J. Sasikumar; Mankombu Gopalakrishnan (dialogues)
- Screenplay by: Mankombu Gopalakrishnan
- Produced by: T. K. Balachandran
- Starring: Prem Nazir; KPAC Lalitha; Thikkurissy Sukumaran Nair; Jose Prakash
- Cinematography: Kanniyappan
- Edited by: K. Narayanan
- Music by: G. Devarajan
- Release date: 5 May 1977
- Country: India
- Language: Malayalam

Sakhakkale Munnoottu is a 1977 Indian Malayalam-language film, directed by J. Sasikumar and produced by T. K. Balachandran. The film stars Prem Nazir, KPAC Lalitha, Thikkurissy Sukumaran Nair and Jose Prakash. The film has musical score by G. Devarajan.

== Cast ==
- Prem Nazir
- KPAC Lalitha
- Thikkurissy Sukumaran Nair
- Jose Prakash
- Sankaradi
- Sreelatha Namboothiri
- Sumithra
- T. K. Balachandran
- Vidhubala

== Soundtrack ==
The music was composed by G. Devarajan and the lyrics were written by Mankombu Gopalakrishnan.

No.	Song	Singers	Lyrics	Length (m:ss)
1	"Akshaya Shakthikale"	P. Jayachandran, Chorus	Mankombu Gopalakrishnan	
2	"Makayirappanthal"	C. O. Anto, Karthikeyan	Mankombu Gopalakrishnan	
3	"Paalaazhi Mankaye"	K. J. Yesudas, P. Madhuri	Mankombu Gopalakrishnan	
4	"Pachakkarimbinte"	K. J. Yesudas	Mankombu Gopalakrishnan	
5	"Varnachirakulla"	P. Jayachandran	Mankombu Gopalakrishnan	
