= Bheekara Nimishangal =

1970 film

- Directed by: M. Krishnan Nair
- Screenplay by: Jagathy N. K. Achari
- Story by: K. Balachander
- Produced by: P. Arunachalam
- Starring: Sathyan; Madhu; Sheela; Adoor Bhasi
- Cinematography: Dathu
- Edited by: V. P. Krishnan
- Music by: M. S. Baburaj
- Production company: Savithri Pictures
- Distributed by: Savithri Pictures
- Release date: 29 May 1970
- Country: India
- Language: Malayalam

Bheekara Nimishangal (transl. Terrifying Moments) is a 1970 Indian Malayalam film, directed by M. Krishnan Nair and produced by P. Arunachalam. The film stars Sathyan, Madhu, Sheela and Adoor Bhasi in the lead roles. The film had a musical score by M. S. Baburaj. It was a remake of the 1965 Tamil film Naanal.

== Cast ==
- Sathyan as Mancheri Raghavan
- Madhu as Inspector Venu
- Sheela as Savithry
- Adoor Bhasi as Ranger James
- T. S. Muthaiah as Vikraman Thampi
- Sankaradi
- Bahadoor
- N. Govindankutty as Velu
- Paravoor Bharathan
- Ushakumari as Indira
- Vincent as Murali
- Khadeeja
- Abbas
- Baby Savitha
- Geetha
- Kuttan Pillai
- Hema

== Soundtrack ==
The music was composed by MS Baburaj and the lyrics were written by Vayalar Ramavarma.

No.	Song	Singers	Lyrics	Length (m:ss)
1	"Anjalippoo"	P. Susheela	Vayalar Ramavarma	
2	"Pirannaal Innu Pirannaal"	L. R. Eeswari	Vayalar Ramavarma	
3	"Thulasi Devi"	P. Susheela	Vayalar Ramavarma	
4	"Vaisaakha Poojaykku"	K. J. Yesudas, S. Janaki	Vayalar Ramavarma	
