= Nathoon =

- Directed by: K. Narayanan
- Written by: Muttathu Varkey; A. Sheriff (dialogues)
- Screenplay by: A. Sheriff
- Starring: Rani Chandra; Sudheer; Vincent; Bahadoor
- Cinematography: Kanniyappan
- Edited by: K. Narayanan
- Music by: M. S. Baburaj
- Production company: Malithra Productions
- Distributed by: Malithra Productions
- Release date: 13 April 1974
- Country: India
- Language: Malayalam

Nathoon is a 1974 Indian Malayalam-language film, directed by K. Narayanan. The film stars Rani Chandra, Vincent, Sudheer and Bahadoor. The film has musical score by M. S. Baburaj.

== Cast ==
- Rani Chandra
- Sudheer
- Vincent
- Adoor Bhasi
- Thikkurissy Sukumaran Nair
- Sankaradi
- Sreelatha Namboothiri
- Bahadoor
- N. Govindankutty

== Soundtrack ==
The music was composed by M. S. Baburaj and the lyrics were written by Sreekumaran Thampi.

No.	Song	Singers	Lyrics	Length (m:ss)
1	"Kaarthika Njaattuvela"	K. J. Yesudas, Chorus	Sreekumaran Thampi	
2	"Kavilathu Kannoru"	S. Janaki	Sreekumaran Thampi	
3	"Oru Kannil Oru Kadal"	K. J. Yesudas, L. R. Anjali	Sreekumaran Thampi	
4	"Sathyathin Chirakodinju"	K. J. Yesudas	Sreekumaran Thampi	
5	"Yesumaathave"	S. Janaki	Sreekumaran Thampi	
