= Swimming Pool (1976 film) =

- Poster
- Directed by: J. Sasikumar
- Written by: Jagathy N. K. Achary
- Produced by: Thayyil Kunjikandan
- Starring: Kamal Haasan; M. G. Soman; Sumithra; Thikkurissy Sukumaran Nair; Rani Chandra
- Cinematography: C. J. Mohan
- Edited by: G. Venkittaraman
- Music by: M. K. Arjunan
- Production company: Chelavoor Pictures
- Release date: 26 March 1976
- Country: India
- Language: Malayalam

Swimming Pool is a 1976 Indian Malayalam-language film, directed by J. Sasikumar, starring Kamal Haasan, M. G. Soman, Sumithra, Rani Chandra and Thikkurissy Sukumaran Nair.

== Cast ==
- Kamal Haasan
- M. G. Soman
- Sumithra
- Rani Chandra
- Thikkurissy Sukumaran Nair
- Bahadoor
- Sankaradi
- Paravoor Bharathan

== Production ==
Swimming Pool film directed by J. Sasikumar, produced by Thayyil Kunjikandan under production banner Chelavoor Pictures. This film was shot in black-and-white. The final length of the film was 3,997.96 metres (13,116.7 ft), down from 3,999.18 metres (13,120.7 ft) by the Central Board of Film Certification.

== Soundtrack ==
The music was composed by M. K. Arjunan.

Track listing
No.	Title	Lyrics	Singer(s)	Length
1.	"Ente Premam"	Vayalar Ramavarma	K. J. Yesudas
2.	"Kanna Karimukil Varnna"	P. Bhaskaran	Vani Jairam
3.	"Kannaalen Nenjathu"	P. Bhaskaran	P. Jayachandran, Ambili
4.	"Neelathadaakathile"	Vayalar Ramavarma	P. Jayachandran, Ambili
5.	"Sumangalaathira Rathri"	Bharanikkavu Sivakumar	K. J. Yesudas
