= Anadha =

1970 film

- Directed by: J. D. Thottan
- Written by: Parappurathu
- Screenplay by: Parappurathu
- Produced by: P. I. M. Kasim
- Starring: Prem Nazir; Sheela; Jayabharathi; Kaviyoor Ponnamma
- Cinematography: P. Dathu
- Edited by: V. P. Krishnan
- Music by: M. S. Baburaj
- Production company: Sony Pictures
- Distributed by: Sony Pictures
- Release date: 20 February 1970
- Country: India
- Language: Malayalam

Anadha (transl. Orphan) is a 1970 Indian Malayalam-language film directed by J. D. Thottan and produced by P. I. M. Kasim. The film stars Prem Nazir, Sheela, Jayabharathi and Kaviyoor Ponnamma in the lead roles. The film has musical score by M. S. Baburaj.

== Cast ==
- Prem Nazir
- Sheela
- Jayabharathi
- Kaviyoor Ponnamma
- Adoor Bhasi
- Kottayam Santha
- Sreelatha Namboothiri
- T. S. Muthaiah
- K. P. Ummer
- Meena

== Soundtrack ==
The music was composed by M. S. Baburaj and the lyrics were written by P. Bhaskaran.

No.	Song	Singers	Lyrics	Length (m:ss)
1	"Etho Sundara"	S. Janaki	P. Bhaskaran	
2	"Hemantha Nidrayil"	S. Janaki	P. Bhaskaran	
3	"Indulekha Than"	K. J. Yesudas	P. Bhaskaran	
4	"Mullappoo Baanathaal"	P. Susheela	P. Bhaskaran	
5	"Thaalolam Kili"	P. Susheela	P. Bhaskaran	
