= Athirthikal =

- Directed by: J. D. Thottan
- Written by: M. T. Vasudevan Nair
- Screenplay by: M. T. Vasudevan Nair
- Starring: Madhu; Srividya; Jagathy Sreekumar; Sankaradi
- Cinematography: Melly Dayalan
- Edited by: V. P. Krishnan
- Music by: G. Devarajan
- Production companies: T & T Productions
- Distributed by: T & T Productions
- Release date: 13 August 1988
- Country: India
- Language: Malayalam

Athirthikal is a 1988 Indian Malayalam film, directed by J. D. Thottan. The film stars Madhu, Srividya, Jagathy Sreekumar and Sankaradi in the lead roles. The film has musical score by G. Devarajan.

== Plot ==
Based on M. T. Vasudevan Nair's short story 'Dar-Es-Salaam', the plot follows Keshavan, a cosmetics salesman working in town and living on the outskirts with his pregnant wife Devi, and their daughter, Anitha. He goes around shops with his driver Velayudhan and is efficient in coaxing shop owners to display his company's products. He is not a dedicated salesman but knows how to sugarcoat his area Manager Pillai. When he meets an old acquaintance of his, Stanly, who is back in town and staying at a lodge, Keshu fakes to his wife and neighbour Krishnan Ammavan that it is eosinophilia caused by his daily scooter ride to the town, and that doctor advised him to stay in the city. Keshu moves to the lodge and spends time drinking. On one attempt, he and Stanly try to catch up with an old hangout of theirs, an aunty but fails to meet her. When one of his products gets slammed by a woman complaining to a prominent magazine, Keshu is asked to look into it. He meets the complainant Reetha and her husband Major Mukundan, who served many years in Dar-Es-Salaam, Tanzania and have even named their house so. Major finds Keshu's father-in-law was a childhood friend of his which makes him open up to him. Keshu finds them welcoming and the house having African curios and showpieces. They have a son who is studying in UK and prefers not to visit them. Major spends his days in the house, having drinks in the evening while Reethu is engaged with women's association working for orphanages and other social activities among children. Keshu notices Major taking digs at such activities of women which Reetha laughs off.

Another day, Reetha helps Keshu in boosting his sales of a nail polish. He visits her house when Major happens to be out and over drinks, they talk about her activities; she asks him about Devi's interests and he replies she is a silent type who has none. A drunk Major makes Reetha confide in Keshu about him already having had an attack and that she would be alone if something happens to him. Keshu and Reetha end up being intimate. They start meeting each other in tourist spots. Keshu finds his wife not beautiful enough when compared to Reetha and not having any interests, he stops visiting his home on weekends. He takes money from his boss citing wife's pregnancy and spends it on Reetha. Major goes with Keshu on one of his visits home and bonds with Devi and Anitha. When Anitha later asks about Reetha, Keshu avoids the subject.

When Reetha meets with an accident and Devi is taken to hospital for delivery, Keshu goes for checking out on Reetha. Her death destroys him. When he meets Major to extend his condolences, he finds a Major who wanted to kill Reetha when she was alive, he explains her to be nymphomaniac who had a wayward sexual life while in Africa. Major reveals to Keshu the African curio which is hidden in the store room of the house - Reetha's African daughter. Major calls Reetha a hypocrite who worked for orphans while hiding her own child from the world. He tells him about Reetha being the reason their son won't visit them. Finally, Major thanks Keshu for his company. Keshu goes back to his home prays at the thulasithara and accepts the responsibility of his wife, child and newborn baby.

== Cast ==
- Rajkumar Sethupathy as Keshavan/Keshu
- Madhu as Major Mukundan
- Srividya as Reetha Mukundan
- Jalaja as Sreedevi/Devi
- Jagathy Sreekumar as Stanly
- Sankaradi as Manager Pilla
- Bahadoor as Krishnamman
- Mala Aravindan as Velayudhan
- Baby Soumya as Anitha
- Devan as guest appearance in a song
- Thrissur Elsy as Devi's mother

== Soundtrack ==
The music was composed by G. Devarajan and the lyrics were written by P. Bhaskaran.

No.	Song	Singers	Lyrics	Length (m:ss)
1	"Numberu Lesham"	Vincent Gomes	P. Bhaskaran	
2	"Onnakkam Onnakkam"	K. J. Yesudas	P. Bhaskaran	
