= Mylanji =

1982 film directed by M. Krishnan Nair

- Directed by: M. Krishnan Nair
- Music by: A. T. Ummer
- Release date: 9 July 1982
- Country: India
- Language: Malayalam

Mylanji (transl. Henna Tattoo) is a 1982 Indian Malayalam film, written by Moidu Padiyath and directed by M. Krishnan Nair. A. T. Ummer composed the music. Mylanji also means henna in Malayalam.

== Cast ==
- Janardhanan as Moideen
- K.R.Vijaya as Moideen's illegal wife
- Shubha as Moideen's legal wife
- Ambika as Shahitha Moideen's illegal daughter
- Shanavas as Mansoor
- Lalu Alex
- Anjali Naidu as Moideen's legal daughter
- Balan K. Nair as Abdul Rahman Haji
- Sankaradi as Beenran Kunju
- Mala Aravindan as Moosa

== Soundtrack ==
The music was composed by A. T. Ummer and the lyrics were written by P. Bhaskaran.

| No. | Song | Singers | Lyrics | Length (m:ss) |
|---|---|---|---|---|
| 1 | "Alankaara Chamayathaal" | Chorus, Laila Razak | Bappu velliparamb | |
| 2 | "College Laila" | K. J. Yesudas, Ambili | P. Bhaskaran | |
| 3 | "Ithuvare Ithuvare" | K. J. Yesudas, Ambili | P. Bhaskaran | |
| 4 | "Kaalu Manniluraykkaatha" | K. J. Yesudas | P. Bhaskaran | |
| 5 | "Kokkara Kokkara" | Vilayil Valsala, V. M. Kutty | P. Bhaskaran | |
| 6 | "Maamalayile" | K. J. Yesudas | P. Bhaskaran | |
| 7 | "Malarvaaka Poomaaran" | Chorus, Laila Razak | | |
