= Dhikku Theriyadha Kaattil =

1972 film by N. C. Chakravarthi

- Theatrical poster
- Directed by: N. C. Chakravarthi
- Story by: Nagesh; N. C. Chakravarthi; V. S. Raghavan
- Starring: Jayalalithaa; R. Muthuraman; Baby Sumathi
- Cinematography: B. S. Lokanath
- Edited by: N. M. Shankar
- Music by: M. S. Viswanathan
- Production company: Ramkumar Films
- Release date: 11 February 1972
- Running time: 141 minutes
- Country: India
- Language: Tamil

Dhikku Theriyadha Kaattil (transl. Lost in the dense forest) is a 1972 Indian Tamil-language film directed by N. C. Chakravarthi and produced by Ramkumar Films. The film's story was written by Nagesh, V. S. Raghavan and N. C. Chakravarthi and dialogue by Thuyavan with music by M. S. Viswanathan. The film stars R. Muthuraman, Jayalalithaa and Baby Sumathi. It was released on 11 February 1972.

== Plot ==
A child gets lost in a forest converged upon by several groups of people, each with their own purpose.

== Cast ==
- Jayalalithaa as Vijaya
- R. Muthuraman as Vijaya's Husband
- Nagesh as Constable 1
- V. K. Ramasamy as Constable 2
- Baby Sumathi as Meena
- M. N. Nambiar as Prisoner Kali Muthu
- V. S. Raghavan as Prisoner Raju
- Major Sundarrajan as Williams, Hunter
- Senthamarai as Police Inspector
- Sudharsan as Joseph, Hunter/Williams friend
- Sachu as Raji, College Student 1
- V. Gopalakrishan as Ganesh, College Student 2
- Vennira Aadai Moorthy as College Students 3
- Maali as Kailasam
- Kaathadi Ramamoorthy as College Student 4
- Jambu as College Student 5
- Saibaba as College Student 6
- Pushpa as College Student 7
- Kalpana as College Student 8
- Sujatha as College Student 9
- Girija as College Student 10
- Lakshmi as College Student 11

== Soundtrack ==
The music was composed by M. S. Viswanathan and lyrics were written by Vaali.

Songs	Singers	Length
"Poo Poova Paranthu"	M. S. Rajeswari	03:51
"Pattukkaran Paadi"	L. R. Eswari, S. P. Balasubrahmanyam, B. S. Vasantha, Saibaba	04:57
"Kettathellam Naan"	S. P. Balasubrahmanyam, P. Susheela	05:04
"Kuliradikuthey"	L. R. Eswari, M. L. Srikanth, S. P. Balasubrahmanyam, S. Janaki	04:20
"Kaatradikkum Thesaiyinile"	Sirkazhi Govindarajan	03:35
Dance Music	Instrumental	02:58

== Release and reception ==
Dhikku Theriyatha Kaattil was released on 11 February 1972. Film World said, "The treatment is inane, in spite of the comedy patches provided by Nagesh and V. K. Ramaswami. The performances on the whole are mediocre." The film was later dubbed in Hindi as Barah Ghante.
