= Swarnna Malsyam =

- Directed by: B. K. Pottekkad
- Written by: Sreekumari; Mankombu Gopalakrishnan (dialogues)
- Produced by: P. M. Sreenivasan
- Starring: Madhu; Jayabharathi; Adoor Bhasi; Thikkurissy Sukumaran Nair
- Cinematography: N. Karthikeyan
- Edited by: N. R. Natarajan
- Music by: M. S. Baburaj
- Production company: Manappuram Movies
- Distributed by: Manappuram Movies
- Release date: 3 January 1975
- Country: India
- Language: Malayalam

Swarnna Malsyam is a 1975 Indian Malayalam-language film, directed by B. K. Pottekkad and produced by P. M. Sreenivasan. The film stars Madhu, Jayabharathi, Adoor Bhasi and Thikkurissy Sukumaran Nair. The film has musical score by M. S. Baburaj.

== Cast ==
- Madhu
- Jayabharathi
- Adoor Bhasi
- Thikkurissy Sukumaran Nair
- Sreelatha Namboothiri
- Adoor Pankajam
- Khadeeja
- Rani Chandra

== Soundtrack ==
The music was composed by M. S. Baburaj and the lyrics were written by Mankombu Gopalakrishnan.

No.	Song	Singers	Lyrics	Length (m:ss)
1	"Aashakalerinjadangi"	P. Susheela	Mankombu Gopalakrishnan	
2	"Maanikyappoomuthu"	K. J. Yesudas	Mankombu Gopalakrishnan	
3	"Njaattuvelakkaaru"	K. P. Brahmanandan, M. S. Baburaj, P. Susheeladevi, Radha	Mankombu Gopalakrishnan	
4	"Paalapookkumee Raavil"	K. J. Yesudas	Mankombu Gopalakrishnan	
5	"Thulaavarsha Meghamoru"	K. J. Yesudas	Mankombu Gopalakrishnan	
