= Moham =

- Directed by: Rander Guy
- Written by: V. T. Nandakumar
- Screenplay by: V. T. Nandakumar
- Produced by: Rander Guy
- Starring: Sudheer; Raghavan; Baby Sumathi; Janardanan
- Cinematography: Ashok Kumar
- Edited by: Ramesh
- Music by: M. K. Arjunan
- Production company: Mareena Productions
- Distributed by: Mareena Productions
- Release date: 14 June 1974
- Country: India
- Language: Malayalam

Moham is a 1974 Indian Malayalam film, directed and produced by Rander Guy. The film stars Sudheer, Raghavan, Baby Sumathi and Janardanan in the lead roles. The film had musical score by M. K. Arjunan.

== Cast ==
- Sudheer
- Raghavan
- Baby Sumathi
- Janardanan
- Kavitha
- Kuthiravattam Pappu
- Radhadevi
- Sreelatha Namboothiri

== Soundtrack ==
The music was composed by M. K. Arjunan and the lyrics were written by P. Bhaskaran.

No.	Song	Singers	Lyrics	Length (m:ss)
1	"Cheppo Cheppo"	P. Madhuri	P. Bhaskaran	
2	"Madanapushpavana Shalabhangale"	P. Madhuri	P. Bhaskaran	
3	"Vishaala Jeevitha"	K. J. Yesudas	P. Bhaskaran	
