= Sathyathinte Nizhalil =

- Directed by: Babu Nandancode
- Screenplay by: Sreekumaran Thampi
- Story by: Prema Shanmugham
- Produced by: Prema Shanmugham
- Starring: Sudheer; Bahadoor; Janardanan; Kunchan; KP Ummer; Pappu; Ushanandini
- Cinematography: P. S. Nivas
- Edited by: Sasikumar
- Music by: V. Dakshinamoorthy
- Production company: Hariram Movies
- Release date: 10 October 1975
- Country: India
- Language: Malayalam

Sathyathinte Nizhalil (transl. In the shadow of truth) is 1975 Indian Malayalam-language crime thriller film directed by Babu Nandancode. The story was written by Prema Shanmugham with screenplay by Sreekumaran Thampi. The film stars Sudheer, K. P. Ummer, Ushanandini, Bahadoor, Pappu, Thikkurisi Sukumaran Nair, Philomina, Janardanan and Kunchan. Sudheer won the Kerala State Film Award for Best Actor for his role in the film. This was P. S. Nivas's first film as an independent cinematographer.

== Cast ==
- Sudheer
- KP Ummer
- Bahadoor
- Janardanan
- Kunchan
- Thikkurisi Sukumaran Nair
- Pappu
- Philomina
- Ushanandini
- Usharani

== Soundtrack ==
The music was composed by V. Dakshinamoorthy and the lyrics were written by Sreekumaran Thampi.

Song	Singers
"Kaaladevathathanna Veena"	P. Susheela
"Njanuminnoru Dushyanthanaayi"	K. J. Yesudas
"Swargathilulloru"	K. J. Yesudas
"Swarnamalli Pushpavanathil"	K. J. Yesudas, Ambili

== Reception ==
A critic from Free India praised the film noting "Pleasing music and photography make the film entertaining".
