= Ival Eevazhi Ithu Vare =

- Directed by: K. G. Rajasekharan
- Written by: Mankombu Gopalakrishnan
- Screenplay by: Mankombu Gopalakrishnan
- Produced by: V. Gangadharan
- Starring: Jayabharathi; Adoor Bhasi; Jose Prakash; Balan K Nair
- Cinematography: T. V. Kumar
- Edited by: V. P. Krishnan
- Music by: Shankar–Ganesh
- Production company: Darsanalayam
- Distributed by: Darsanalayam
- Release date: 12 December 1980
- Country: India
- Language: Malayalam

Ival Eevazhi Ithu Vare is a 1980 Indian Malayalam film, directed by K. G. Rajasekharan and produced by V. Gangadharan. The film stars Jayabharathi, Adoor Bhasi, Jose Prakash and Balan K. Nair in the lead roles. The film has musical score by Shankar–Ganesh.

== Cast ==
- Jayabharathi
- Adoor Bhasi
- Jose Prakash
- Balan K. Nair
- M. G. Soman

== Soundtrack ==
The music was composed by Shankar–Ganesh and the lyrics were written by Mankombu Gopalakrishnan.

No.	Song	Singers	Lyrics	Length (m:ss)
1	"Manassinte Mandaara"	K. J. Yesudas, Ambili	Mankombu Gopalakrishnan	
2	"Moodal Manjil"	K. J. Yesudas, Ambili	Mankombu Gopalakrishnan	
3	"Thaalam"	K. J. Yesudas	Mankombu Gopalakrishnan	
4	"Ushassinte"	Vani Jairam	Mankombu Gopalakrishnan	
