= Aaradhika =

- Directed by: B. K. Pottekkad
- Written by: N. Govindankutty
- Screenplay by: N. Govindankutty
- Produced by: G. P. Balan
- Starring: Jayabharathi; Raghavan; Rani Chandra; Vincent
- Cinematography: K. K. Menon
- Edited by: V. P. Krishnan
- Music by: M. S. Baburaj
- Production company: Chanthamani Films
- Distributed by: Chanthamani Films
- Release date: 11 May 1973
- Country: India
- Language: Malayalam

Aaradhika is a 1973 Indian Malayalam film, directed by B. K. Pottekkad and produced by G. P. Balan. The film stars Jayabharathi, Raghavan, Rani Chandra and Vincent in the lead roles. The film had musical score by M. S. Baburaj.

== Cast ==
- Jayabharathi as Hema
- Raghavan as Hari
- Rani Chandra as Latha
- Vincent as Jayan
- Adoor Bhasi as Settu
- Sreelatha Namboothiri as Lucy
- Nilambur Balan as Prem
- Paul Vengola as Paul
- Philomina as Hostel Warden
- Vijayan (Old)
- Lathika (Old)

== Soundtrack ==
The music was composed by M. S. Baburaj and the lyrics were written by Sreekumaran Thampi.

No.	Song	Singers	Lyrics	Length (m:ss)
1	"Aashrama Pushpame"	K. J. Yesudas	Sreekumaran Thampi	
2	"Chottaannikkara Bhagavathi"	L. R. Eeswari	Sreekumaran Thampi	
3	"Kaamadevante Sreekovilil"	K. J. Yesudas	Sreekumaran Thampi	
4	"Sangeethamaathmaavin Sougandhikam"	P. Leela, B. Vasantha	Sreekumaran Thampi	
5	"Thaamaramalarin Thankadalathil"	P. Susheela	Sreekumaran Thampi	
6	"Unaroo Vasanthame"	L. R. Eeswari	Sreekumaran Thampi	
