= Nurayum Pathayum =

- Directed by: J. D. Thottan
- Written by: Thakazhi Sivasankara Pillai; Thoppil Bhasi (dialogues)
- Screenplay by: Thoppil Bhasi
- Produced by: J. D. Thottan
- Starring: Madhu; Adoor Bhasi; P. J. Antony; Sankaradi
- Cinematography: Ashok Kumar
- Edited by: V. P. Krishnan
- Music by: G. Devarajan
- Production company: JJ Arts
- Distributed by: JJ Arts
- Release date: 11 March 1977
- Country: India
- Language: Malayalam

Nurayum Pathayum is a 1977 Indian Malayalam-language film, directed and produced by J. D. Thottan. It is based on the works and social themes of writer Thakazhi Sivasankara Pillai. The film stars Madhu, Adoor Bhasi, P. J. Antony and Sankaradi in the lead roles. G. Devarajan composed the music.

== Cast ==
- Madhu
- Adoor Bhasi
- P. J. Antony
- Sankaradi
- Shobha
- Prathapachandran
- Bahadoor
- Kanakadurga
- Sadhana

== Soundtrack ==
The music was composed by G. Devarajan with lyrics for the songs by Vayalar Ramavarma and P. Bhaskaran.

No.	Song	Singers	Lyrics	Length (m:ss)
1	"Akkareyoru Poomaram"	P. Madhuri	Vayalar Ramavarma	
2	"Maanathe Venkthinkal"	P. Madhuri	P. Bhaskaran	
3	"Manujaabhilaashangal"	K. J. Yesudas	P. Bhaskaran	
4	"Urakkathil Chumbichu"	K. J. Yesudas	P. Bhaskaran	
