= Mayavi (1965 film) =

- Directed by: G. K. Ramu
- Written by: Neela; Sree (dialogues)
- Screenplay by: Sree
- Produced by: P. Subramaniam
- Starring: Prem Nazir; Madhu; Sheela; K. V. Shanthi; Rajalakshmi; Adoor Bhasi
- Cinematography: G. K. Ramu
- Edited by: N. Gopalakrishnan
- Music by: M. S. Baburaj
- Production company: Neela
- Distributed by: Neela
- Release date: 28 August 1965
- Country: India
- Language: Malayalam

Mayavi (transl. Illusionist) is a 1965 Indian Malayalam-language film, directed by G. K. Ramu and produced by P. Subramaniam. The film stars Prem Nazir, Madhu, Sheela, K. V. Shanthi, Rajalakshmi and Adoor Bhasi. The film had musical score by M. S. Baburaj.

== Cast ==
- Prem Nazir as Raghu
- Madhu as Madhu
- Sheela as Vasanthy
- K. V. Shanthi as Jayanthi/Maalini
- Rajalakshmi
- Adoor Bhasi as Bhasi
- Kottarakkara Sreedharan Nair as Prathapan
- Aranmula Ponnamma as Raghu's mother
- Thikkurissy Sukumaran Nair as Krishna Menon
- S. P. Pillai as Kaimani
- Paravoor Bharathan as Police officer
- Sreekantan Nair
- Anandavally
- Kundara Bhasi
- Muttathara Soman
- Soman
- Vaikom Mani
- M.R Bharathan

== Soundtrack ==
The music was composed by M. S. Baburaj and the lyrics were written by P. Bhaskaran and .

No.	Song	Singers	Lyrics	Length (m:ss)
1	"Ee Jeevitham Innoru"	Kamukara, K. P. Udayabhanu	P. Bhaskaran	
2	"Harinaakshi" (Kadhakalipadam)			
3	"Kalivaakku Chollumbol"	L. R. Eeswari, Chorus	P. Bhaskaran	
4	"Kannaaram Pothi"	P. Leela, Kamukara	P. Bhaskaran	
5	"Pandorikkal"	P. Leela	P. Bhaskaran	
6	"Pavizhakkunnil"	S. Janaki	P. Bhaskaran	
7	"Valakilukkum Vaanampaadi"	S. Janaki, K. P. Udayabhanu	P. Bhaskaran	
8	"Vandaaranikkuzhali"	L. R. Eeswari, Kamukara	P. Bhaskaran	
