= Zero Babu =

Indian actor

- Born: K J Babu; 28 December 1939; Kochi, Kerala, India
- Died: 21 October 2020 (aged 80)
- Genres: Playback singing, Carnatic music
- Occupation: Singer
- Instrument: Vocals
- Years active: 1964–1982
- Label: Audiotracs

K. J. Mohammed Babu (28 December 1939 – 21 October 2020), also known as Zero Babu, was an Indian film singer, actor and music composer who was active in Malayalam cinema during the 1980s. He was a theater artist turned movie actor. His debut film song was for Kudumbini in 1964 at the age of 18. In a P. J. Antony’s play, Babu played the role of a man who is fed up with life owing to the cotton gambling game that prevailed in the past. Open Zero was the name of the game. Ever since he acted the role and performed a song called Open Zero, he was known as Zero Babu. He also composed a few songs including Nakshathrangal Chimmum for the 1983 film Marakkilorikkalum, Manavaattippennorungi for the 1982 movie Kurukkante Kalyaanam. He was a recipient of the Kerala Sangeetha Nataka Akademi Award and also sung in nearly 90 films and various plays. He has sung more than 300 movie songs.

== Personal life ==
He was married to Athikka and has four children, Sooraj, Sulfikar, Deepa and Sabitha. He died on 21 October 2020 due to age-related illness. He was 80. His funeral held at Ernakulam North Thottathumpadi Juma Masjid on Thursday at 11 am.

== Filmography ==
=== As an actor ===
- Maadatharuvi (1967)
- Kaboolivala (1993)

=== As a music composer ===
- Ponnonathumbikalum Ponveyilum ... Kurukkante Kalyaanam 1982
- Anuragame En Jeevanilunaroo ... Kurukkante Kalyaanam 1982
- Manavaattippennorungi ... Kurukkante Kalyaanam 1982
- En manassil [F] ... Marakkilorikkalum 1983
- En manassil [M] ... Marakkilorikkalum 1983
- Nakshathrangal chimmum ... Marakkilorikkalum 1983

=== As a singer ===
- Kanninu Kanninu ... Kudumbini 1964
- Mundoppaadatu Koythinu ... Bhoomiyile Maalakha 1965
- Aakaashathambalamuttathu (duet with S. Janaki and Bangalore Latha ... Bhoomiyile Malakha 1965
- Kaivittupoya ... Bhoomiyile Maalakha 1965
- Pattiniyaal Pallaykkullil ... Jeevithayaathra 1965
- Vandikkaran Beeran ... Porter Kunjali 1965
- Kalyaanam Kalyaanam ... Station Master 1966
- Kumbalam Nattu ... Postman 1967
- Maanathekku ... Karutha Raathrikal 1967
- Paampine Pedichu ... NGO 1967
- Chakkaravaakku ... Khadeeja 1967
- Karakaanaakkayalile ... Aval 1967
- Love in Kerala ... Love In Kerala 1968
- Aliyaaru Kaakka ... Ballaatha Pahayan 1969
- Neeyoru Raajaavu ... Saraswathi 1970
- Vrindaavanathile Raadhe ... Love Marriage 1975
- Dukhithare ... Love Letter 1975
- Malayattoor Malayumkeri ... Thomasleeha 1975
- Premathinu Kannilla ... Tourist Bungalow 1975
- Kaanthaari ... Criminals (Kayangal) 1975
- Paalanchum ... Sthreedhanam 1975
- Uncle Santa Clause ... Anubhavam 1976
- Aashaane Namukku Thodangam (Maniyan Chettikku) ... Aval Oru Devaalayam 1977
- Kale Ninne Kandappol ... Mohavum Mukthiyum 1977
- Muthubeevi ... Choondakkari 1977
- Maasapadikkare ... Ithikkarappakki 1980
- Pathinaalam Beharinu (Koottiladachitta painkili) ... Ithikkarappakki 1980
- Maamoottil Beerante (Komban Meesakkaaran) ... Ithikkarappakki 1980
- Thinkalkkala Thirumudiyil Choodum ... Ithikkarappakki 1980
- Thaamarappoovanathile ... Ithikkarappakki 1980
- Aayilyam ... Naagamadathu Thampuraatti 1982
- Dukhathin Kaippillaathe ... Innallenkil Naale 1982
- Swargathil N.O.C ... Kanmanikkorumma (Ushnabhoomi) 1982
- Sangathi kozhanjallu ... Visa 1983
