= Kuttavum Shikshayum (1976 film) =

- Promotional Poster
- Directed by: M. Masthan
- Written by: Mankombu Gopalakrishnan (dialogues)
- Screenplay by: M. Masthan
- Produced by: K. S. R. Moorthy
- Starring: Kamal Haasan; Sridevi; Bahadoor; K. P. Ummer
- Cinematography: C. Namasivayam
- Edited by: P. V. Narayanan
- Music by: M. S. Viswanathan
- Production company: Chithranjali
- Distributed by: Central pictures
- Release date: 9 July 1976
- Country: India
- Language: Malayalam

Kuttavum Shikshayum (transl. Crime and punishment) is a 1976 Indian Malayalam-language film, directed by M. Masthan and produced by K. S. R. Moorthy. The film stars Kamal Haasan, Sridevi, Bahadoor and K. P. Ummer. The film has musical score by M. S. Viswanathan. It was a remake of the 1973 Tamil film Pennai Nambungal.

== Cast ==
- Kamal Haasan
- Sridevi
- Bahadoor
- K. P. Ummer
- M. G. Soman
- Rajakokila
- Vidhubala
- Sukumari

== Soundtrack ==
The music was composed by M. S. Viswanathan and the lyrics were written by Mankombu Gopalakrishnan.

No.	Song	Singers	Lyrics	Length (m:ss)
1	"Aavani Poorna"	S. Janaki, P. Jayachandran	Mankombu Gopalakrishnan	
2	"Kannanaamunni"	P. Susheela, P. Leela	Mankombu Gopalakrishnan	
3	"Krishna Mukunda"	M. S. Viswanathan, Saibaba	Mankombu Gopalakrishnan	
4	"Malarilum Manassilum"	Vani Jairam	Mankombu Gopalakrishnan	
5	"Swayamvarathirunaal"	K. J. Yesudas	Mankombu Gopalakrishnan	
