= Kamini (film) =

1974 Indian film

- Directed by: Subair
- Screenplay by: Subair
- Story by: Subair; Sreerangam Vikraman Nair
- Produced by: H.H. Abdulla Settu, Anwar
- Starring: Raghavan; Rani Chandra
- Cinematography: Ashok Kumar
- Edited by: Ramesh
- Music by: M. S. Baburaj
- Production company: Chitrabharathi
- Distributed by: Chitrabharathi
- Release date: 25 January 1974
- Country: India
- Language: Malayalam
- Box office: Super Hit

Kamini is a 1974 Indian Malayalam film, directed by Subair and produced by H.H. Abdulla Settu and Anwar. The film stars Rani Chandra, Prema, T. R. Omana, Raghavan and T. S. Muthaiah in the lead roles. The film has musical score by M. S. Baburaj.

== Cast ==
- Prema as Doctor
- T. R. Omana as Lakshmi
- Raghavan as Chandran
- T. S. Muthaiah as Rajasekharan
- Alleppey Vincent as Prakash
- Baby Sumathi as Young Hema
- Bahadoor as Ashokan
- Kuthiravattam Pappu as Appu
- Rani Chandra as Vasanthi
- Roja Ramani as Hema

== Soundtrack ==
The music was composed by M. S. Baburaj and the lyrics were written by Subair.

No.	Song	Singers	Lyrics	Length (m:ss)
1	"Muralikayoothunna"	S. Janaki	Subair	
2	"Manmadhanorukkum"	K. J. Yesudas	Subair	
3	"Ashicha Kadavil"	S. Janaki	Subair	
4	"Venna Kondo"	K. J. Yesudas	Subair	
