= Rani Chandra =

Indian dancer and film actress (1949–1976)

- Born: 2 June 1949; Fort Kochi, Travancore-Cochin, India
- Died: 12 October 1976 (aged 27); Bombay, Maharashtra, India

Rani Chandra (2 June 1949 – 12 October 1976) was an Indian actress, model, and a winner of Miss Kerala. She died when Indian Airlines Flight 171 crashed in Bombay in 1976. She acted in several landmark films such as Nellu (Malayalam, 1974), Bhadrakali (Tamil, 1976) and Swapnadanam (Malayalam, 1976).

== Background ==
She was born to Chandran and Kanthimathi in 1949 at Fort Kochi, Travancore-Cochin (now Kerala). She had four sisters and a brother. She pursued degree from St Thereses College Ernakulam. She owned a dance troupe. Actress Chippy is the daughter of Rani Chandra's brother Shaji. Rani Chandra was selected as Miss Kerala in 1972.

== Career ==
Her first film, Anjusundarikal, was widely accepted by the audience. Other major films included Ulsavam, Kadarumasam, Nellu, Swapnadanam, Oonjal, Alinganam, Abhinandanam, Sindoooram, Thirumadhuram, and Anuragam. She won the Kerala State Film Award for Best Actress for the film Swapnadanam. Rani Chandra played the major role in the very popular Tamil cinema song in the film Bhadrakali.

== Death ==
Rani Chandra, her mother, and three sisters were killed in Indian Airlines Flight 171 crash in 1976. They were on a return flight from Bombay when their plane caught fire and nose dived near the airport, killing everyone on board. They were returning from a dance performance in the Middle East. Their earlier flight from Bombay to Madras returned to Bombay shortly after takeoff after a snag hit. The aircraft and all passengers were re-boarded onto the flight. The dead included members of her music troupe as well.

After her death, the unfinished portion of the movie Bhadrakali was finished using a double. The movie ends using earlier footage of Rani Chandra.

== Awards ==
Kerala State Film Awards:

- 1975 - Best Actress - Swapnadanam

== Filmography ==
=== Malayalam ===
1. Oonjal (1977)
2. Sindooram (1976)
3. Amba Ambika Ambaalika(1976) as Ambika
4. Ayalkkaari (1976) as Sathi
5. Swapnaadanam (1976) as Sumithra
6. Chirikkudukka (1976) as Malathi
7. Anaavaranam (1976)
8. Mallanum Mathevanum (1976)
9. Muthu (1976)
10. Madhuram Thirumadhuram (1976) as Radha
11. Lakshmivijayam (1976)
12. Swimming Pool (1976)
13. Abhinandanam (1976) as Radha
14. Udyaanalakshmi (1976)
15. Aalinganam (1976) as Dr. Raji
16. Malsaram (1975)
17. Criminals (Kayangal) (1975)
18. Swarnna Malsyam (1975)
19. Hello Darling (1975) as Sumithra
20. Mucheettukalikkaarante Makal (1975) as Zainaba
21. Ayodhya (1975)
22. Chalanam (1975) as Joyamma
23. Odakkuzhal (1975)
24. Ulsavam (1975) as Leela
25. Love Marriage (1975) as Viji
26. Ullaasayaathra (1975)
27. Boy Friend (1975)
28. Swaami Ayyappan (1975)
29. Swarnnavigraham (1974)
30. Bhoogolam Thiriyunnu (1974) as Vijayamma
31. Naathoon (1974)
32. Poonthenaruvi (1974) as Vimala
33. Devi Kanyaakumaari (1974)
34. Shaapamoksham (1974)
35. Sapthaswarangal (1974) as Mini
36. Youvanam (1974) as Sharada
37. Kaamini (1974)
38. Nellu (1974) as Javani
39. Soundarya Pooja (1973)
40. Swapnam (1973) as Vasumathi
41. Udayam (1973) as Hema
42. Kaattuvithachavan (1973)
43. Police Ariyaruthu (1973) as Alice
44. Kaalachakram (1973) as Geetha.
45. Ragging (1973)
46. Pacha Nottukal(1973) as Rosie
47. Aaraadhika (1973) as Latha
48. Jesus (1973) as Kanaikkari
49. Kaapaalika(1973) as Lillykutti
50. Ajnaathavasam(1973) as Kamala
51. Driksaakshi (1973) as Rajamma
52. Omana (1972) as Pennamma
53. Brahmachaari (1972)
54. Puthrakameshti (1972)
55. Sree Guruvayoorappan (1972)
56. Devi (1972)
57. Chembarathi (1972) as Savithri
58. Prathidhwani (1971)
59. Vivaaham Swargathil (1970)
60. Vivahasammanam (1970) as Sundari
61. Anaachaadhanam (1969)
62. Anchusundarikal (1968)
63. Pavappettaval (1967) (credited as Miss Kerala)

=== Tamil ===
1. Bhadrakali (1976)
2. Swami Ayyappan (1975)
3. Then Sindhudhe Vaanam (1975)
4. Radha (1973)
5. Porchilai (1969)
