= Vanchiyoor Madhavan Nair =

Indian theatre artist and actor

- Occupation: Film actor
- Years active: 1951–1986
- Parent(s): Kunjan Pillai; Parukuttiyamma

Madhu (Vanchiyoor Madhavan Nair) was an Indian theatre artist and actor in Malayalam movies of the 1960s and 1970s. He appeared in several films of "Neela Studios" of Thiruvananthapuram. His popular movies are Navalokam (1951), Baalyasakhi (1954) and Chief Guest (1975). He had acted in dramas on more than 4000 stages. He was the elder brother of Malayalam actor T. K. Balachandran. He was born to Kunjan Pilla and Parukuttiyamma at Thiruvananthapuram.

== Partial filmography ==
- Navalokam (1951)
- Aathmashanthi (1952)
- Baalyasakhi (1954)
- Poymukhangal (1973)
- Chief Guest (1975)
- Chottaanikkara Amma (1976)
- Udyaanalakshmi (1976)
- Amba Ambika Ambaalika (1976)
- Sreemurukan (1977)
- Kaayalum Kayarum (1979)
- Pralayam (1980)
- Kaattu Kallan (1981)
- Paavaadapraayathil (1989)
- A Sreenarayana Guru (1986)
- Swamy Ayyappan (1976)
- Devi Kanyakumari (1974)
