= Checkpost (film) =

- Directed by: J. D. Thottan
- Written by: J. D. Thottan; S. L. Puram Sadanandan (dialogues)
- Screenplay by: S. L. Puram Sadanandan
- Produced by: J. D. Thottan
- Starring: Sathyan; Adoor Bhasi; Thikkurissy Sukumaran Nair; Muthukulam Raghavan Pillai
- Edited by: V. P. Krishnan
- Music by: P. S. Divakar
- Production companies: T&T Productions
- Distributed by: T&T Productions
- Release date: 8 March 1974
- Country: India
- Language: Malayalam

Checkpost is a 1974 Indian Malayalam-language film, directed, produced and co-written by J. D. Thottan. The film stars Sathyan, Adoor Bhasi, Thikkurissy Sukumaran Nair and Muthukulam Raghavan Pillai. The film had musical score by P. S. Divakar.

== Cast ==
- Sathyan
- Adoor Bhasi
- Thikkurissy Sukumaran Nair
- Muthukulam Raghavan Pillai
- Pattom Sadan
- Ambika
- Bahadoor
- Kamaladevi
- Kottarakkara Sreedharan Nair
- S. P. Pillai
- Sadhana
- Shailasree
- Ushanandini

== Soundtrack ==
The music was composed by P. S. Divakar and the lyrics were written by P. Bhaskaran.

No.	Song	Singers	Lyrics	Length (m:ss)
1	"Kalluvalayitta Kayyil"	Pattom Sadan	P. Bhaskaran	
2	"Poothachedayan Kaadu"	K. J. Yesudas, Kalyani Menon	P. Bhaskaran	
3	"September Moon"	K. J. Yesudas, Latha Raju	P. Bhaskaran	
4	"Thaalolam Kiliyude"	S. Janaki	P. Bhaskaran	
5	"Thaamarathoniyil"	K. J. Yesudas	P. Bhaskaran	
