= Youvanam =

- Directed by: Babu Nanthankode
- Written by: Sreekumaran Thampi
- Screenplay by: Sreekumaran Thampi
- Produced by: P. Subramaniam
- Starring: Madhu; Raghavan; Vijayasree; Thikkurissy Sukumaran Nair; Rani Chandra
- Cinematography: E. N. C. Nair
- Edited by: N. Gopalakrishnan
- Music by: V. Dakshinamoorthy
- Production company: Neela
- Distributed by: Neela
- Release date: 11 April 1974
- Country: India
- Language: Malayalam

Youvanam is a 1974 Indian Malayalam-language film, directed by Babu Nanthankode and produced by P. Subramaniam. The film stars Madhu, Thikkurissy Sukumaran Nair, Raghavan, Vijayasree and Rani Chandra. The film had musical score by V. Dakshinamoorthy.

== Cast ==
- Madhu as Mohan
- Raghavan as Ravi
- Vijayasree as Mini
- Rani Chandra as Sharada
- Thikkurissy Sukumaran Nair
- K. V. Shanthi as Lakshmi
- Aranmula Ponnamma as Ravi's mother
- S. P. Pillai as Kunju Nair
- Paravoor Bharathan as Mathew
- Radhamani as Margaret
- Bahadoor as Rajan
- Anandavally as Doctor
- Adoor Pankajam as Rajan's Girlfriend

== Soundtrack ==
The music was composed by V. Dakshinamoorthy and the lyrics were written by Sreekumaran Thampi.

No.	Song	Singers	Lyrics	Length (m:ss)
1	"Daivame Deepame"	S. Janaki	Sreekumaran Thampi	
2	"Hare Raama"	Chorus	Sreekumaran Thampi	
3	"Kannaadi Vilakkumaay"	K. J. Yesudas	Sreekumaran Thampi	
4	"Madhurameenakshi"	S. Janaki	Sreekumaran Thampi	
5	"Swararagamadhuthoovum"	K. J. Yesudas	Sreekumaran Thampi	
6	"Swarnappoonchola"	K. J. Yesudas, S. Janaki	Sreekumaran Thampi	
