= Swarnavigraham =

- Directed by: Mohan Gandhiraman
- Written by: Mankombu Gopalakrishnan
- Screenplay by: Mankombu Gopalakrishnan
- Produced by: Mohan Gandhiraman
- Starring: Jayabharathi; Adoor Bhasi; Sreelatha Namboothiri; Raghavan
- Cinematography: Beypore Mani
- Music by: M. B. Sreenivasan
- Production company: Gandhi Raman Films
- Release date: 17 October 1974
- Country: India
- Language: Malayalam

Swarnavigraham (transl. Golden idol) is a 1974 Indian Malayalam-language film, directed and produced by Mohan Gandhiraman. The film stars Jayabharathi, Adoor Bhasi, Sreelatha Namboothiri and Raghavan and featured a musical score by M. B. Sreenivasan.

== Cast ==
- Vincent
- Raghavan
- Jayabharathi
- Adoor Bhasi
- Sreelatha Namboothiri
- Khadeeja
- Rani Chandra
- Sadhana

== Soundtrack ==
The music was composed by M. B. Sreenivasan and the lyrics were written by Mankombu Gopalakrishnan and Thikkurissy Sukumaran Nair.

No.	Song	Singers	Lyrics	Length (m:ss)
1	"Bhagavaante Munnil"	K. J. Yesudas	Mankombu Gopalakrishnan	
2	"Manasse Nee Marakkoo"	L. R. Eeswari	Mankombu Gopalakrishnan	
3	"Naanam Maraykkaan"	K. J. Yesudas, Adoor Bhasi	Thikkurissy Sukumaran Nair	
4	"Swarnavigrahame"	K. J. Yesudas, S. Janaki	Mankombu Gopalakrishnan	
5	"Sweekarikkoo"	L. R. Eeswari	Mankombu Gopalakrishnan	
