= Bhoomiyile Malakha =

Malayalam film

- Directed by: P. A. Thomas
- Written by: C. L. Jose; Jesey (dialogues)
- Screenplay by: Jesey
- Produced by: P. A. Thomas
- Starring: Prem Nazir; Rajalakshmi; Sukumari; Lakshmi; Adoor Bhasi; Thikkurissy Sukumaran Nair
- Cinematography: P. B. Maniyam
- Edited by: T. R. Sreenivasalu
- Music by: Jaya Vijaya; M. A. Majeed; P. S. Divakar
- Production company: Thomas Pictures
- Release date: 9 October 1965
- Country: India
- Language: Malayalam

Bhoomiyile Malakha (Angel on Earth) is a 1965 Indian Malayalam-language film, directed and produced by P. A. Thomas. The film stars Prem Nazir and Rajalakshmi, with Sukumari, Lakshmi, Adoor Bhasi and Thikkurissy Sukumaran Nair in supporting roles. The film had musical score by Jaya Vijaya, M. A. Majeed and P. S. Divakar.

== Cast ==
- Prem Nazir as Sunny
- Rajalakshmi
- Sukumari
- Lakshmi as Chinamma
- Adoor Bhasi
- Thikkurissy Sukumaran Nair
- Kedamangalam Sadanandan
- Muthukulam Raghavan Pillai
- O. Ramdas
- Devidasan
- Jesey
- T. S. Muthaiah
- Aravindakshan
- Gopalan
- Kaduvakulam Antony
- Kalaikkal Kumaran
- Master Shaji Thomas
- Mohan
- Nirmala
- Panjabi
- Paravoor Bharathan
- Sumathi
- T. K. Balachandran
- V. S. Achari
- Vijayan

== Soundtrack ==
The music was composed by Jaya Vijaya, M. A. Majeed and P. S. Divakar and the lyrics were written by Thomas Parannoor, K. C. Muttuchira, K. M. Alavi, Varghese Vadakara and Sreemoolanagaram Vijayan.

| No. | Song | Singers | Lyrics | Length (m:ss) |
|---|---|---|---|---|
| 1 | "Aakaashathambalamuttathu" | S. Janaki, Bangalore Latha, Zero Babu | Thomas Parannoor | |
| 2 | "Kaivittupoya" | Chorus, Zero Babu | K. C. Muttuchira | |
| 3 | "Maadappiraavalle" | S. Janaki | K. M. Alavi | |
| 4 | "Mulmudichodiya Naadha" | S. Janaki | Varghese Vadakara | |
| 5 | "Mundoppaadatu Koythinu" | P. Leela, Zero Babu | Sreemoolanagaram Vijayan | |
