= Kuppivala =

- Directed by: S. S. Rajan
- Written by: Moidu Padiyath
- Produced by: N. Krishnan
- Starring: Prem Nazir; Sukumari; Ambika; Bahadoor
- Edited by: G. Venkittaraman
- Music by: M. S. Baburaj
- Production company: Lotus Pictures
- Release date: 7 May 1965
- Country: India
- Language: Malayalam

Kuppivala (transl. Glass bangles) is a 1965 Indian Malayalam-language film, written by Moidu Padiyath directed by S. S. Rajan and produced by N. Krishnan. The film stars Prem Nazir, Sukumari, Ambika and Bahadoor. It was released on 7 May 1965.

== Cast ==
- Prem Nazir as Majeed
- Sukumari as Pachumma
- Ambika as Khadeeja
- Bahadoor as Porker/Chellathodu
- Kottayam Chellappan as Beeran Sahib
- Nilambur Ayisha as Pathiri Amina
- Johnson as Muhammedali
- Muthukulam Raghavan Pilla as Kittumman
- Haji Abdul Rahman as Maulavi
- S. Malathi as Vijayamma
- Kutty Padmini as Tharabi

== Soundtrack ==
All lyrics are written by P. Bhaskaran; all music is composed by M. S. Baburaj.

No.	Title	Artist(s)	Length
1.	"Ithu Bappa Njan Umma"	Renuka	02:54
2.	"Kaanaan Pattaatha"	A. M. Rajah	03:32
3.	"Kaattupaaya Thakarnnallo"	K. J. Yesudas	03:33
4.	"Kanmani Neeyen Karam"	P. Susheela, A. M. Rajah	03:03
5.	"Kuru Kuru Mecham Pennundo"	L. R. Eswari, Choir	04:52
6.	"Kurunthottikkaaya"	A. P. Komala	03:15
7.	"Madhurappoovana"	L. R. Eswari, Choir	03:42
8.	"Peraattin Karayil Vachu"	Baburaj	02:17
9.	"Pottichirikkalle"	P. Leela	03:20
