= Sumathi (actress) =

Indian actress from Madurai, Tamil Nadu

- Born: Sumathi; 19 August 1964 (age 62); Madurai, Tamil Nadu, India
- Other names: Baby Sumathi, Sumi
- Occupation: Actress
- Years active: 1966–1989
- Relatives: Master Prabhakar (brother)

Sumathi is an Indian actress from Madurai, Tamil Nadu. She started her career at the age of two. She starred in many Malayalam, Tamil, Telugu, Kannada, and Hindi language films.

== Personal life ==
Sumathi was born in Madurai a city in Tamil Nadu India. Her father and mother were originally from Madurai. Her father managed several businesses such as photo studio and printing press. Her mother, was a housewife taking care of Sumathi and her seven brothers and three sisters. Her elder brother Master Prabhakar was the first one in the family to enter the film industry.

In 1966, Sumathi moved in with her Aunt along with Prabhakar to pursue her dreams. Sumathi entered the film industry when a director was looking for a young baby to play a role in a Malayalam film along with veteran actor Bharath Gopi.

Sumathi is married and settled in America with their daughter and son.

== Career ==
She started her film career in Tamil movies as a child actress (Baby Sumathi) by playing the role of daughter of Gopi in the late 60's. She appeared in many children's movies. She played dual roles and in some movies acted as a boy. Soon she moved to Telugu and Malayalam films, where she starred in many films.

As Baby Sumathi grew up, she took to modeling and started endorsing many products. She has won many Nandi and Filmfare awards as a child. She acted many films with her third elder brother Master Prabhakar and second younger brother Kumar. As soon as her brothers entered the film industry, most of her family members were interested to go on the same line. Sumathi's cousin was a well known actress who was successful in various Tamil films. Sumathi's other cousins were cinematography and assistant directors. Sumathi also dubbed for many actresses in the past in many languages.

In her acting career, she was often stereotyped as the girl next door. She acted with many stars such as M. G. Ramachandran, Sivaji Ganesan, Gemini Ganesan, Jaya Bachchan, Manorama, Nagesh, Rajinikanth, Jayalalithaa, Ambika, and Bhagyaraj to name a few. Her debut film, as heroine, was Bhagyaraj's directorial debut; Suvarillatha Chithirangal (1978) in Tamil. She gave up her acting career at the peak after her marriage in 1989 to move to America.

== Awards ==
=== Child Artist awards in Malayalam ===
Baby Sumathi is a three-time winner Kerala State Film Award for Best Child Artist (female).

- 1969 Best Female Child Artist (female) Baby Sumathi - Nadhi
- 1972 Best Female Child Artist (female) Baby Sumathi
- 1977 Best Female Child Artist(female) Baby Sumathi - Shankupushpam

== Filmography ==
=== Malayalam ===
- Nadhi (1969) as Babymol
- Kuttavali (1970) as Young Santhi
- Kochaniyathi (1971) as Young Indu
- Anubhavangal Paalichakal (1971) as Kumari
- Thettu (1971) as Minimol
- Muthassi (film) (1971) as Rekha
- Panitheeratha Veedu (1972)
- Prathikaram (1972) as Leela
- Professor (1972) as Rema
- Sree Guruvayoorappan (1972)
- Achanum Bappayum (1972) as Young Amina
- Maram (1973)
- Padmavyooham (1973) as Leenamol
- Panitheeratha Veedu (1973) as Roshini
- Veendum Prabhatham (1973) as Young Ravi
- Azhakulla saleena (1973) as Sajan
- Kamini (1974) as Young Seema
- Moham (1974)
- Nagaram Sagaram (1974)
- Chandrakantham (1974) as Young Vinayan, Bindu (double role)
- Poonthenaruvi (1974) as Young Valsamma
- Jeevikkan Marannu Poya Sthree (1974)
- Bhoogolam Thiriyunnu (1974) as Gopi's daughter
- Sethubandanam (1974) as in dual role as Kavitha / Saritha
- Swamy Ayyappan (1975) Young Girl
- Chattambikkalyaani (1975) as Young Kalyani
- Dharmakshetre Kurukshetre (1975) as
- Soorya Vamsham (1975)
- Chief Guest (1975)
- Thiruvonam (1975) as Manju
- Pravaham (1975) as Young Ragini
- Hiridhayam Oru Kshethram (1976) as Sumam
- Abhimaanam (1976) as Latha
- Anubhavam (1976) as Young Mary
- Chennaya Valarthiya Kutty (1976) as Young Omana
- Thulavarsham (1976) as Young Ammini
- Chottanikkara Amma (1976)
- Shankupushpam (1977) as Mini
- Sathyavan Savithri (1977)
- Hridayame Sakshi (1977)
- Sree Murukan (1977)
- Aradhana (1977)
- Sneha Yamuna (1977)
- Amme Anupame (1977)
- Aa Nimisham (1977)
- Veedu Oru Swargam (1977)
- Aasheervatham (1977)
- Aval Oru Devalayam (1977)
- Neethipeedham (1977)
- Vidarunna Mottukal (1977) Kanchana
- Samudram (1977) as Bindu
- Rathi Nirvedam (1978) as Shanthi
- Kaithappo (1978)
- Avalude Ravukal (1978)
- Ashtamudikkayal (1978)
- Avalkku Maranamilla (1978)
- Aaru Manikkoor (1978)
- Mudramothiram (1978) as Amina
- Sarapanchaaram (1979) as Young Baby
- Choola (1979)
- Radha Enna Pennkutti (1979)
- Raathrikal Ninakku Vendi (1979)
- Lajjavathi (1979) as Sandhya
- Lovely (1979)
- Pathivritha (1979)
- Indradhanussu (1979)
- Maani Koya Kurup (1979)
- Kanathavalayam (1980)
- Vazhiyile Yathrakkar (1981)
- Enne Njan Thedunnu (1983) as Janaki
- Aval Kaathirunnu Avanum (1986)

=== Tamil ===
- Iru Kodugal (1969)
- Vaa Raja Vaa (1969)
- Thirudan (1969) as Guest Role
- Avare En Deivam (1969)
- Enga Mama (1970) as Anni Pesant
- Thirumalai Thenkumari (1970)
- Penn Deivam (1970)
- Engirundho Vandhaal (1970)
- Engal Mama (1970) as Annie Pesant
- Thangaikkaaga (1971) as Young Radha
- Annai Velankanni (1971)
- Justice Viswanathan (1971)
- Velli Vizha (1972)
- Appa Tatta! (1972)
- Naan Yen Pirandhen (1972)
- Dhikku Theriyadha Kaattil (1972) as Meena
- Komatha En Kulamatha (1973) as Punithavathi
- Karaikkal Ammaiyar (1973) as Valli
- Swamy Ayyappan (1975) as Young Girl
- Avandhan Manidhan (1975) as Selvi
- Vattathukkul Chaduram (1978)
- Ennai Pol Oruvan (1978) as Shanthi
- Suvarilladha Chiththirangal (1979) as Saroja
- Sigappukkal Mookkuthi (1979) as Janaki
- Saranam Ayyappa (1980)
- Pennin Vazhkai (1981)
- Ponnazhagi (1981)
- Azhagu (1984)
- Naan Sigappu Manithan (1985)
- Amman Kaatiya Vazhi (1991)

=== Telugu ===
- Balaraju Katha (1970)
- Manchivadu (1973) as Rani
- Pasi Hrudayalu (1973)
- Bangaru Kalalu (1974)
- Urvashi (1974) as Suguna & Aruna
- Rakta Sambandhalu (1975)
- Swarganiki Nichchenalu (1977)
- Sangeeta (1981)
- Pedala Brathukulu (1981)

=== Kannada ===
- Mannina Magalu (1974)

=== Hindi ===
- Ghar Ghar Ki Kahani (1970, film, as Baby Sumathi)
- Swarg Narak (1978, film, as Baby Sumathi)
