= Bhoogolam Thiriyunnu =

- Directed by: Sreekumaran Thampi
- Written by: Sreekumaran Thampi
- Screenplay by: Sreekumaran Thampi
- Produced by: Sreekumaran Thampi
- Starring: Raghavan; Rani Chandra; Roja Ramani; Vincent
- Cinematography: Vipin Das
- Edited by: M. S. Mani
- Music by: V. Dakshinamoorthy
- Production company: Rajashilpi
- Distributed by: Rajashilpi
- Release date: 12 July 1974
- Country: India
- Language: Malayalam

Bhoogolam Thiriyunnu is a 1974 Indian Malayalam film, directed and produced by Sreekumaran Thampi. The film stars Raghavan, Rani Chandra, Roja Ramani and Vincent in the lead roles. The film featured original songs composed by V. Dakshinamoorthy.

== Cast ==
- Raghavan as Sukumaran
- Rani Chandra as Vijayamma
- Roja Ramani as Mani
- Vincent as Jayan
- Sukumari as Chandramathi
- KPAC Lalitha as Vatsala
- Sankaradi as Aanashanku Pilla
- T. R. Omana as Gauriyamma
- T. S. Muthaiah as Subramanyan Aashaari
- Paul Vengola as Marriage broker
- Alummoodan as Prakkattu Kurup
- Baby Sumathi as Gopi's Daughter
- Bahadoor as Krishnan Kutty
- C. K. Aravindakshan as Varghese
- C. K. Saraswathi as Elzabeth
- Janardanan as Gopi
- Kunchan as Aanakkaaran Panikkar
- Kuthiravattam Pappu as Vandikkaaran
- Master Rajakumaran Thampi as Gopi's Son
- Sadhana as Morukaari Paaru
- M. G. Soman as Dr. Murali

== Soundtrack ==
The music was composed by V. Dakshinamoorthy and the lyrics were written by Sreekumaran Thampi.

No.	Song	Singers	Lyrics	Length
1	"Kaurava Sadassil"	P. Susheela	Sreekumaran Thampi	2:47
2	"Njanoru Paavam Morris"	P. Jayachandran	Sreekumaran Thampi	3:14
3	"Ochirakkalikaanan Kondupokam"	K. J. Yesudas	Sreekumaran Thampi	3:09
4	"Thulasi Pootha"	K. J. Yesudas	Sreekumaran Thampi	3:30
