= Kaliyodam =

- Directed by: P. Subramaniam
- Written by: Kanam EJ
- Screenplay by: Kanam EJ
- Produced by: P Subramaniam
- Starring: Prem Nazir; Madhu; Rajalakshmi; Thikkurissy Sukumaran Nair; Babu Joseph
- Cinematography: E. N. C. Nair
- Edited by: N. Gopalakrishnan
- Music by: G. Devarajan
- Production company: Neela
- Distributed by: Neela
- Release date: 10 April 1965
- Country: India
- Language: Malayalam

Kaliyodam is a 1965 Indian Malayalam-language film, directed and produced by P. Subramaniam. The film stars Prem Nazir, Madhu, Rajalakshmi, Thikkurissy Sukumaran Nair and Babu Joseph. The film had musical score by G. Devarajan.

== Cast ==
- Prem Nazir as Gopi
- Madhu as Venu
- Thikkurissy Sukumaran Nair as Raman Nair
- Rajalakshmi
- Babu Joseph as Ramesh
- Anandavally
- Jayanthi as Vasanthy
- Pankajavalli as Bhargaviyamma
- Ramachandran Nair
- S. P. Pillai as Kittu pilla
- K. V. Shanthi as Radha
- Aranmula Ponnamma as Janaki
- Baby Vinodini

== Soundtrack ==
The music was composed by G. Devarajan and the lyrics were written by O. N. V. Kurup.

No.	Song	Singers	Lyrics	Length (m:ss)
1	"Illoru Thulli Panineeru"	P. Susheela	O. N. V. Kurup	
2	"Kaamuki Njaan"	S. Janaki	O. N. V. Kurup	
3	"Kaliyodam"	K. J. Yesudas, S. Janaki, P. Leela	O. N. V. Kurup	
4	"Kaliyodam" (F)	P. Leela, Chorus	O. N. V. Kurup	
5	"Maathalamalare"	Kamukara	O. N. V. Kurup	
6	"Munnil Peruvazhimaathram"	K. J. Yesudas	O. N. V. Kurup	
7	"Ormakal Than Ithaliloorum"	K. J. Yesudas, S. Janaki, Kamukara	O. N. V. Kurup	
8	"Pambayaarozhukunna Nade"	P. Leela	O. N. V. Kurup	
9	"Thankatheril"	P. Susheela, Kamukara	O. N. V. Kurup	
