= Supriya Gupta Mohile =

American geriatric oncologist

Supriya Gupta Mohile is an American geriatric oncologist specialized in clinical trials and genitourinary and gastrointestinal cancers. She is a professor of Medicine and Surgery at the James P. Wilmot Cancer Center at the University of Rochester. Mohile holds the Philip and Marilyn Wehrheim Professorship. She completed a MD at the Thomas Jefferson Medical College in 1998. She completed a fellowship in oncology at the University of Chicago Medical Center.
