= J. D. Thottan =

Indian film director (1922–1997)

J. D. Thottan (23 February 1922 – 23 September 1997) was an Indian director and screenwriter of Malayalam language films. Indian Cinema cited him along with M. Krishnan Nair, S. S. Rajan, and A. B. Raj as one of the Malayalam film industry's successful film directors.

== Films ==
He directed films such as Sthreehridayam (1960) and Karinizhal (1971).

== Selected filmography ==
- Koodappirappu (1956)
- Chathurangam (1959)
- Sthreehridayam (1960)
- Kalyaana Photo (1964)
- Sarpakadu (1965)
- Anadha (1970)
- Vivaaham Swargathil (1970)
- Karinizhal (1971)
- Gangaasangamam (1971)
- Vivaahasammanam (1971)
- Omana (1972)
- Checkpost (1974)
- Nurayum Pathayum (1977)
- Athirthikal (1988)
