= M. S. Baburaj =

Music composer

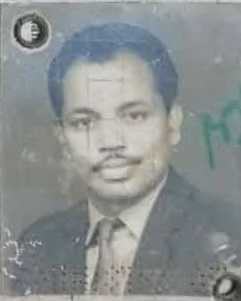

Background information
- Also known as: Baburaj, Babukka
- Born: Mohammad Sabir Baburaj; 3 March 1929; Calicut, Malabar District, Madras Presidency, British India
- Died: 7 October 1978 (aged 49) Madras, Tamil Nadu, India
- Genres: Film score, Mappila songs
- Occupations: Composer; Singer; Instrumentalist
- Instrument: Harmonium pump organ
- Years active: 1957–1978
- Label: His Master's Voice

Mohammad Sabir Baburaj (3 March 1929 – 7 October 1978) was an Indian music composer. He is often credited with the renaissance of Malayalam film music. Baburaj rendered music for many evergreen Malayalam film songs.

== Biography ==
=== Early life ===
Baburaj was born on 3 March 1929 in Kozhikode. He was the son of Jan Muhammed Khan, a Hindustani musician from West Bengal, and a Malayali mother. His father, who frequently performed in Kerala, abandoned the family during Baburaj's childhood and returned to Kolkata. As a result, Baburaj grew up in financially difficult circumstances and is reported to have sung on trains to earn money.

=== Music career ===
Baburaj is noted for incorporating elements of Hindustani music into Malayalam film music. He composed melodies based on Hindustani ragas and adapted them to Malayalam-language lyrics, many of which were written by poets such as P. Bhaskaran and Vayalar Ramavarma.

According to biographical accounts, Baburaj received his earliest exposure to Hindustani music from his father. He later travelled to West Bengal, Mumbai and Sri Lanka, where he continued his musical studies and learned to play the harmonium.

After returning to Kerala, Baburaj faced financial difficulties and reportedly sang in public to earn a living. During this period, he came under the care and support of Kunjumuhammed, a policeman from Kozhikode and a music enthusiast, who recognised his musical talent and encouraged his development.

Baburaj subsequently composed music for Malayalam stage dramas in the Malabar region before entering the film industry. In 1957, he made his debut as a film composer with Minnaminugu, directed by Ramu Kariat. He later collaborated with P. Venu on Udhyogastha (1967), for which he composed songs including "Anuragaganam Pole", "Ezhuthiyatharanu Sujatha" and "Kalichirimaaratha Penne".

The collaboration between Baburaj, P. Bhaskaran and K. J. Yesudas produced a number of notable Malayalam songs during the 1960s and 1970s. Many of Baburaj's duets were performed by P. Leela, Yesudas and S. Janaki, who also recorded several of his solo compositions. A number of his songs, including "Oru Pushpam Mathramen", have remained popular in Kerala and continue to be performed at public events and musical programmes.

His last recorded song was "Thrikkakkare Theerthakkare", sung by P. Susheela for the film Yagaswam (1978), directed by Hariharan.

=== Death ===
Baburaj died on 7 October 1978 at a general hospital in Madras (now Chennai) at the age of 49 after suffering a massive haemorrhagic stroke.

== Legacy ==
Although Baburaj achieved recognition as a composer, he experienced financial difficulties throughout his life. Various cultural and musical organisations have organised programmes in his memory, with some events raising funds for his family.

In 1983, Baburaj posthumously received the Kerala Sangeetha Nataka Akademi Award in the Light Music category.

Manorama Music acquired an audio cassette in 2005, containing recordings of Baburaj performing some of his own compositions in an informal setting. The recordings were remixed and released under the title Baburaj Padunnu. The album introduced these recordings to a new audience and highlighted Baburaj's singing style.

In 2014, he was posthumously honoured with the Kamukara Music Award, established by the Kamukara Foundation. The award was received by his wife, Bicha Baburaj.

== Personal life ==
Baburaj married Bicha, daughter of Kallayi Kundungal Moideen and Bichamina, in 1956. They had nine children: Sabira, Deedar, Gulnar, Abdul Jabbar, Shamshad, Roshna, Zulfikar, Farhad and Shamna.

== Notable songs ==
- Thamasamenthe Varuvan Pranasakhi
- Pranasakhi
- Anuraga Ganam Pole
- Oru Pushpam Mathramen Hridayathil Sookshikkam
- Vaasantha Panjami Naalil
- Ezhuthiyatharanu Sujatha
- Kanneerum Swapnangalum Vilkkuvanaayi Vannavan Njan
- Eeranuduthumkondambaram Chuttunna
- Aadiyil Vachanamundaayi
- Kalichirimaaratha Penne
- Vichana Theerame
- Innale Mayangumbol
- Thankam Vegam
- Chandramimbam Nenjilettum
- Pavada prayathil
- Annu ninte Nunakkuzhi
- Vellichilankayaninjum
- Kadali Vazha Kayyilirunnu
- Surumayezhuthiya Mizhikale
- Pathiravayilla Pournamikanyakku Pathinezhoe Pathinettoe Prayam
- Pottatha Ponnin Kinavu Kondoru Pattunoolonjala Ketti Njan
- Panja Varna Thatha Pole Konji Vanna Penne
- Pranasakhee Njan Verumoru
- Thaliritta Kinakkal Than Thamara Maala vangan
- Thaane Thirinjum Marinjum
- Sooryakanthee... Sooryakanthee...
- Oru Kochu Swapnathin Chirakumayi
- Kadale Neela Kadale
- Akale Akale Neelakasam
- Ikkarayanente Thamasam
- Pottithakarnna kinavinte
- Anjana Kannezhuthi
- Arabi Kadaloru Manavalan
- Kanmani Neeyen
- Kanmaniye Karayathurangu
- Adyathe Kanmani
- Innente Karalile
- Oru Kotta Ponnundallo
- Nadikalil Sundari Yamuna
- Thamarakumbilallo Mama Hrudayam
- Maamalakalkkappurathu
- Thedunnathaare shoonyathayil
- Anuraaga Nadakathin
- Aadanumariyaam
- Jeevitheswarikkekuvaanoru
- Kottum njan keettilla
- Kaanan pattatha kanakathin manimuthe
- Vinnile kavil pularumbol (Priya)
- Kanninu Kannaya Kanna (Priya)
- Kanneeraloru puzhayundakki (Priya)
- Aadanumariyam kamuka hridayathe (Priya)

== Discography ==
- Minnaminugu (1957)
- Umma (1960)
- Kandam Becha Kottu (1961)
- Mudiyanaya Puthran (1961)
- Laila Majnu (1962)
- Palattu Koman (Konkiyamma) (1962)
- Bhagyajathakam (1962)
- Ninamaninja Kalpadukal (1963)
- Moodupadam (1963)
- Thacholi Othenan (1964)
- Kuttikkuppayam (1964)
- Karutha Kai (1964)
- Bhargavi Nilayam (1964)
- Bharthavu (1964)
- Subaidha (1965)
- Kadathukaran (1965)
- Porter Kunjali (1965)
- Ammu (1965)
- Kuppivala (1965)
- Thankakkudam (1965)
- Kattuthulasi (1965)
- Mayavi (1965)
- Chettathi (1965)
- Thommante Makkal (1965)
- Sarppakkaadu (1965)
- Maanikyakottaram (1966)
- Penmakkal (1966)
- Koottukar (1966)
- Kaattumallika (1966)
- Anarkali (1966)
- Tharavattamma (1966)
- Poochakkanni (1966)
- Kanakachilanga (1966)
- Iruttinte Athmavu (1967)
- Agniputhri (1967)
- Balyakalasakhi (1967)
- Udhyogastha (1967)
- Karutha Rathrikal (1967)
- Khadeeja (1967)
- Anweshichu Kandethiyilla (1967)
- Collector Malathy (1967)
- Pareeksha (1967)
- Manaswini (1968)
- Inspector (1968)
- Kaarthika (1968)
- Lakshaprabhu (1968)
- Love in Kerala (1968)
- Midumidukki (1968)
- Anchu Sundarikal (1968)
- Sandhya (1969)
- Velliyazhcha (1969)
- Virunnukari (1969)
- Saraswathi (1970)
- Anadha (1970)
- Olavum Theeravum (1970)
- Bheekara Nimishangal (1970)
- Vivaham Swargathil (1970)
- Ambalapravu (1970)
- Priya (1970)
- Cross Belt (1970)
- Kuttyedathi (1971)
- Manpeda (1971)
- Lora Neeyevide (1971)
- Rathrivandi (1971)
- Puthenveedu (1971)
- Ernakulam Junction (1971)
- Panimudakku (1972)
- Pulliman (1972)
- Sambhavami Yuge Yuge (1972)
- Azhimukham (1972)
- Mappusakshi (1972)
- Bhadradeepam (1973)
- Aaradhika (1973)
- Ladies Hostel (1973)
- Soundaryapooja (1973)
- Manassu (1973)
- Chuzhi (1973)
- Kaamini (1974)
- Nathoon (1974)
- Swarnna Malsyam (1975)
- Bhaaryaye Aavashyamundu (Samarppanam) (1975)
- Criminals (Kayangal) (1975)
- Njaan Ninne Premikkunnu (1975)
- Sthreedhanam (1975)
- Appooppan (Charithram Aavarthikkunnilla) (1976)
- Srishti (1976)
- Pushpasharam (1976)
- Allahu Akbar (1977)
- Dweepu (1977)
- Yatheem (1977)
- Gaandharvam (Kanakam) (1978)
- Bhrashtu (1978)
- Yagaswam (1978)
- College Beauty (1979)
- Krishnatulasi (1979)

== See also ==
- List of Indian composers
