= Sudheer =

Sudheer is an Indian given name.

== People ==
- Sudheer (Kannada actor)
- Sudheer (Malayalam actor)
- Sudheer Babu, Indian actor and former professional badminton player
- Sudheer Karamana, Indian actor of Malayalam films
- Sudheer Sharma, Nepali author and journalist.
- Sudheer Varma, Indian film director in Telugu cinema
- Sudigali Sudheer, Indian actor and television presenter

== See also ==
- Sudhir
