= Mankombu Gopalakrishnan =

Indian film lyricist and poet (1947 or 1948 – 2025)

- Born: 1947 or 1948; Monkombu, Kingdom of Travancore (present day Alappuzha, Kerala), India
- Died: 17 March 2025 (aged 78); Kochi, Ernakulam, Kerala, India
- Occupations: Lyricist; Scriptwriter
- Years active: 1971–2025
- Spouse: Kanakamma
- Children: 4 Yadhu Krishnan, Rekha Ashokan, Swapna Vinod, (unknown..)
- Parents: Govindan Nair; Devaki Amma

Mankombu Gopalakrishnan (1947 or 1948 – 17 March 2025) was an Indian film lyricist, poet and scriptwriter in the Malayalam film industry.

Gopalakrishnan wrote more than 700 songs for about 200 Malayalam movies. He also wrote the story, screenplay and dialogue for at least 10 Malayalam movies. He died on 17 March 2025, at the age of 78.

== Selected filmography ==
=== Lyrics ===
- Lakshrchana Kandu (Film :Ayalathe sundari)
- Thrayampakam villodinju (Film :Ayalathe Sundadi)
- Chithra Varna pushppathalam (Film:Ayalathe sundae)
- Ilamulla Poove Idanenjin (Lady Teacher)
- Naadan pattinte (film: Babu mon)
- Ashada masam (film:yudha bhoomi
- Raja suyam kazinju (film:Ambili Ammavan)
- sharapanjarathin ullil (film :Karanaparavam)
- Kalidasante kavyabhavanaye (film: sujatha)
- Thalippoo ... Peelippoo (film: sujatha)
- Ashritha valsalane (film:sujatha)
- Swyamvara Subhadina Mangalangal (film: Sujatha)
- Alila thoniyil (film:Avalkku maranamilla)
- Ashtta Mangalaya suprabhatham (film: chennai valarthiya kutty)
- Velicham villakanchu (film: yagaswayam)
- Thozukai netti unarum (film:Boing Boing)
- Nadhagalayi nee varu (film: Ninnishtam Ennishtam)
- Ilam manjin Kulirumayoru kuyil (Film:Ninnishtam Ennishtam)
- Bhagavathi Kavil (film: Mayookham)
- Ee puzhayum (film: Mayookham)
- Mukil Varna mukunda (film:Bahubali 2)
- "Priyam", "Karinthol", "Janani", "Komuram Bheemano", "Etthuka Jenda", "Komba Ninn Kaada" from RRR
- "Pennaale", "Nee Vere Njan", "Neeyanakhilam Thaathaa", "Pala Mukhangal", "Kashmirin Saanu", "Enivarumo Aa Nall", "Enivarumo Aa Nall(Extended Film Version)" and "Pala Mukhangal(Soul Version)" from Animal
- "Fear Song", "Kanninathan Kamanottam" , "Daavudi" , "Pala Mukhangal", "Ayudha Pooja" from Devara: Part 1 - 2024

=== Dialogue ===
- Swarnavigraham (1974)
- Swarnna Malsyam (1975)
- Kuttavum Shikshayum (1976)
- Sakhakkale Munnoottu (1977)
- Ival Eevazhi Ithu Vare (1980)
- Angachamayam (1982)
- Shabadham (1984)

==== Dubbed versions ====
- Chuvanna Pushpam (1982)
- Sangeetha Sangamam (1988)
- 48 Manikkoor (1990)
- Yuvashakthi (1997)
- Ramayanam (1997) (Asianet)
- Mahabharatham (1997–98)
- Chanakyan (1998)
- Company (2002)
- Popcorn (2003)
- Arya (2004)
- Target (2005)
- Glamour Nagaram (2008)
- Police Academy (2008)
- Drona (2009)
- Honeymoon (2009)
- Life Style (2009)
- Dheera (2009)
- Kilimozhi Kinaaram (2010)
- Kaalidaas (2010)
- Sri Rama Rajyam (2012)
- Veera (2013)
- Eecha (2013)
- Baahubali: The Beginning (2015)
- Baahubali: The Conclusion (2017)
- Yathra (2019)
- RRR (2022)

=== Story ===
- Swarnavigraham (1974)
- Ival Eevazhi Ithu Vare (1980)
- Ee Mazha Thenmazha (2000)
- Njaan Anaswaran (2013)

=== Screenplay ===
- Swarnavigraham (1974)
- Sakhakkale Munnoottu (1977)
- Ival Eevazhi Ithu Vare (1980)
