= Abhayadev =

- Abhayadev

Background information
- Born: Ayyappan Pillai; 25 June 1913; Pallam, Kottayam, Kerala, India
- Died: 26 July 2000 (aged 87)
- Occupations: Poet, lyricist
- Years active: 1949–2000
- Label: Audiotracs

Ayyappan Pillai, better known by his pen name Abhayadev (25 June 1913 – 26 July 2000) was an Indian poet and lyricist during the 1970s in Malayalam movies. He wrote lyrics for around 500 films and dialogues for 25 Malayalam movies. He was born to Karimalil Kesava Pillai who was also a well-known poet, at Pallam near Kottayam. He made his debut as a lyricist in the film Vellinakshatram (1949). He was actively involved in the activities of Sahitya Pravarthaka Cooperative Society (SPCS), Hindi Prachar Sabha, and numerous other social and cultural organisations till his death. He was awarded the J. C. Daniel Award in 1995. His grandsons Ambilikuttan is a playback singer, and Jayadevan is a violinist settled in Canada.

== Partial filmography ==
=== Lyrics ===
- Jeevitha Vaadi ... Vellinakshathram 1949
- Aashaheenam ... Vellinakshathram 1949
- Premamanoharame ... Vellinakshathram 1949
- Evam Niravadhiroopangal ... Vellinakshathram 1949
- Alolamala ... Vellinakshathram 1949
- Thrikkodi ... Vellinakshathram 1949
- Aashaamohaname ... Vellinakshathram 1949
- Porinaay Iranguvin ... Vellinakshathram 1949
- Shokavikalame ... Vellinakshathram 1949
- Raagaramya Madhukale ... Vellinakshathram 1949
- Vidhiyude Leela ... Prasanna 1950
- Kalaanikethe Keralamaathe ... Prasanna 1950
- Sukritharaaga ... Prasanna 1950
- Dhavalaroopa ... Prasanna 1950
- Gaanamohana Hare ... Prasanna 1950
- Kaayikasoubhaagyam ... Prasanna 1950
- Sneham Thookum ... Prasanna 1950
- Jaathivairam Neethirahitham ... Prasanna 1950
- Bhaarathamaatha Paripoorna ... Prasanna 1950
- Aagathamaay Madhukaalam ... Prasanna 1950
- Ninnai Sharanaandainthen ... Prasanna 1950
- Ponne Neeyum Njanum ... Prasanna 1950
- Thakarukayo Sakalamen ... Prasanna 1950
- Ellaam Sundaramayam ... Prasanna 1950
- Rathnam Vithachaal ... Nallathanka 1950
- Mahesha Maayamo ... Nallathanka 1950
- Pathiye Daivam ... Nallathanka 1950
- Sodara Bandhamathonne ... Nallathanka 1950
- Imbamerum Ithalaakum ... Nallathanka 1950
- Manoharamee Raajyam ... Nallathanka 1950

=== Dialogue ===
- Yaachakan (1951)
- Desabhakthan (1952)
- Natyathaara (1955)
- Shaanthi Nivas (1962)
- Ardharaathri (1969)
- Jeevithasamaram (1971)
- Sreekrishna Leela (1971)
- Sathi Anasooya (1972)
- Vilakkappetta Kani (1974)
- Aval Oru Thudarkadha (1975)
- Raja Mayoora Varma (1976)
- Kollakkaaran (1976)
- Seethaa Swayamvaram (1976)
- Velaankanni Mathavu (1977)
- Chila Nerangalil Chila Manushyar (1977)
- Misiha Charithram (1978)
- Sankaraabharanam (1980)
- Sapthapadi (1981)
- Thirakal Ezhuthiya Kavitha (1980)
- Panineerppookkal (1981)
- Thennal Thedunna Poovu (1984)
- Mayoori (1985)
