= Sudheer (Malayalam actor) =

Indian actor

- Born: Padiath Abdul Rahim
- Died: 17 September 2004
- Occupation: Film actor
- Years active: 1970–2004
- Spouse: Safiya
- Parent: P. A. Mohiyuddin

Sudheer (died 2004) was an Indian actor who predominantly worked in the Malayalam film industry. He was a lead actor during the 1970s. He acted in more than 100 movies. His role in the movie Chembarathy in 1972 was well noted. He won a Kerala State Film Award in 1975 for his performance in the movie Sathyathinte Nizhalil.

Sudheer has also played the second lead in the 1978 Rajinikanth starrer Bairavi and has played the lead role in Sonna Namba Mateengae.

== Background ==
Sudheer hailed from Kodungallur and was the son of Padiyath P. A. Mohiyuddin, a former District Judge. His first film was Nizhalattam in 1970.

== Awards ==
- 1975 Kerala State Film Awards: Best Actor - Sathyathinte Nizhalil

== Filmography ==
=== Malayalam ===
1. Maaraatha Naadu (2004)
2. Cheri (2003)
3. The Judgement (2003)
4. Nirnnayam (1995) as Adv. Rajendran
5. Kaakkaykkum Poochaykkum Kalyaanam (1995)
6. Aavarthanam (1995)
7. Manassasthrajnante Diary (1995)
8. Sargavasantham (1995)
9. Karma (1995)
10. Kadal (1994)
11. Nepolean (1994)
12. Uppukandam Brothers (1993) as Inspector
13. Bhoomi Geetham (1993) as Doctor Philip
14. Aparna (1993)
15. Kathanayika (1991)
16. Prosecution (1990)
17. Nammude Naadu (1990)
18. Sthreekku Vendi Sthree (1990)
19. Aval Oru Sindhu (1989)
20. Janmashathru (1988)
21. Evidence (1988)
22. Bheekaran (1988)
23. Agnichirakulla Thumpi (1988)
24. Mangalya Charthu (1987) as College Principal
25. Janangalude Sredhakku (1987)
26. Gorilla (1985)
27. Kaatturaani (1985)
28. Chorakku Chora (1985)
29. Ottayaan (1985)
30. Kiraatham (1985) as Adv Ramakrishnan Nair
31. Nishedi (1984) as Williams
32. Raajavembaala (1984) as Varghese
33. Bandham (1983)
34. Shaari Alla Shaarada(1982)
35. Theekkali (1981)
36. Anthappuram (1980)
37. Swargadevatha (1980)
38. Vilkkanundu Swapnangal (1980)
39. Youvanam Daaham (1980)
40. Pancharathnam (1979)
41. Avano Atho Avalo (1979)
42. Kalliyankaattu Neeli (1979)
43. Lovely (1979)
44. Driver Madyapichirunnu (1979)
45. Aval Niraparaadhi (1979)
46. Avalude Prathikaaram (1979)
47. Black Belt (1978)
48. Aalmaaraattam (1978)
49. Seemanthini (1978)
50. Ashokavanam (1978)
51. Puthariyankam (1978)
52. Beena (1978) as Prasad
53. Tiger Salim (1978)
54. Mattoru Karnan (1978)
55. Raghuvamsham (1978)
56. Kaithappoo (1978)
57. Pokkattadikkaari (1978)
58. Aanayum Ambaariyum (1978)
59. Varadakshina (1977)
60. Pattalaam Jaanaki (1977)
61. Sooryakanthi (1977)
62. Muhoorthangal (1977)
63. Raajaparampara (1977)
64. Thaalappoli (1977)
65. Yatheem (1977) as Latheef
66. Nirakudam (1977)
67. Muttathe Mulla (1977)
68. Sindooram (1976)
69. Aayiram Janmangal (1976) as Babu
70. Amba Ambika Ambaalika (1976)
71. Chirikkudukka (1976) as Chandran Menon
72. Thulavarsham (1976) as Maniyan
73. Themmadi Velappan (1976) as Vijayan
74. Agnipushpam (1976)
75. Missi (1976)
76. Udyaanalakshmi (1976)
77. Sathyathinte Nizhalil(1975)
78. Omanakkunju (1975)
79. Hello Darling (1975) as Rajesh
80. Kalyaanappanthal (1975)
81. Gnan Ninne Premikkunnu (1975)
82. Chalanam (1975)
83. Priye Ninakkuvendi (1975)
84. Chandanachola (1975)
85. Love Letter (1975)
86. Penpada (1975) as Chandran
87. Madhurappathinezhu (1975)
88. Boy Friend (1975)
89. Swaami Ayyappan (1975)
90. Poonthenaruvi (1974) as Shaji
91. Vrindaavanam (1974)
92. Pattaabhishekam (1974)
93. Suprabhaatham (1974)
94. Naathoon (1974)
95. Ayalathe Sundari (1974) as Police Inspector
96. College Girl (1974)
97. Oru Pidi Ari (1974)
98. Moham (1974)
99. Thadavukar (1974)
100. Honeymoon (1974)
101. Urvashi Bharathi (1973)
102. Raakkuyil (1973)
103. Kaliyugam (1973)
104. Maasappadi Maathupilla (1973)
105. Swapnam (1973) as Bindu
106. Achaani (1973) as Babu
107. Police Ariyaruthu (1973) as Johnson
108. Kaalachakram (1973)
109. Manassu (1973)
110. Ragging (1973)
111. Chenda (1973)
112. Periyar (1973)
113. Chaayam (1973)
114. Theertha Yathra (1972)
115. Chembarathi (1972) as Rajan
116. Ernakulam Junction (1971) as Ramu
117. Anaadha Shilpangal (1971) as Suresh
118. Nizhalattam (1970) as Haridasan
119. Detective 909 Keralathil (1970)
120. Palunku Paathram (1970)
121. Rest House (1969)

=== Tamil ===
1. Raman Ethanai Ramanadi (1970)
2. Bairavi (1978)
3. Neeya? (1979)
4. Devathai (1979)
5. Soolam (1980)
6. Sonna Namba Mateenga (1984)
7. Kalyanam Oru Kaalkattu (1985)
8. Lesa lesa (2003)
