= List of Malayalam films of 1973 =

The following is a list of Malayalam films released in the year 1973.

Opening		Sl. No.	Film	Cast	Director	Music director	Notes
J A N	19	1	Panitheeratha Veedu	Prem Nazir, Nanditha Bose	K. S. Sethumadhavan	M. S. Viswanathan	
F E B	9	2	Eanippadikal	Madhu, Sharada	Thoppil Bhasi	G. Devarajan	
F E B	16	3	Periyar	Thilakan, Raghavan	P. J. Antony	K. V. Job, P. K. Sivadas	
F E B	22	4	Ragging	P. J. Antony, Vincent	N. N. Pisharady	M. K. Arjunan	
F E B	23	5	Panchavadi	Prem Nazir, Adoor Bhasi	J. Sasikumar	M. K. Arjunan	
M A R	2	6	Bhadradeepam	Prem Nazir, Sharada	M. Krishnan Nair	M. S. Baburaj	
M A R	2	7	Thiruvabharanam	Prem Nazir, Madhu	J. Sasikumar	R. K. Shekhar	
M A R	9	8	Masappady Mathupillai	Jayabharathi, Sudheer	A. N. Thampi	G. Devarajan	
M A R	14	9	Gayathri	Jayabharathi, Soman	P. N. Menon	G. Devarajan	
M A R	16	10	Udayam	Madhu, Sharada	P. Bhaskaran	V. Dakshinamoorthy	
M A R	16	11	Kaalachakram	Prem Nazir, Jayabharathi	K. Narayanan	G. Devarajan	
M A R	30	12	Ponnapuram Kotta	Prem Nazir, Vijayasree	Kunchacko	G. Devarajan	
A P R	12	13	Kaliyugam	Sudheer, Jayabharathi	K. S. Sethumadhavan	G. Devarajan	
A P R	13	14	Kavitha	Ummer, Vijaya Nirmala	Andrew Rynes, Oliver Kohn, Michael Jackson	K. Raghavan	
A P R	27	15	Chenda	Madhu, Srividya	A. Vincent	G. Devarajan	
A P R	27	16	Veendum Prabhatham	Prem Nazir, Sharada	P. Bhaskaran	V. Dakshinamoorthy	
M A Y	11	17	Aaradhika	Jayabharathi, Raghavan	B. K. Pottekkad	M. S. Baburaj	
M A Y	11	18	Manushyaputhran	Madhu, Jayabharathi	Baby	G. Devarajan	
J U N	1	19	Raakuyil	Sudheer, Sujatha	P. Vijayan	Pukazhenthi	
J U N	15	20	Thaniniram	Prem Nazir, Thikkurissy Sukumaran Nair	J. Sasikumar	G. Devarajan	
J U N	22	21	Police Ariyaruthe	Madhu, K. P. Ummer	M. S. Senthil Kumar	V. Dakshinamoorthy	
J U N	29	22	Ladies Hostel	Prem Nazir, Jayabharathi	Hariharan	M. S. Baburaj	
J U L	6	23	Darsanam	Raghavan, Roja Ramani	P. N. Menon	G. Devarajan	
J U L	12	24	Achani	Prem Nazir, Nanditha Bose	A. Vincent	G. Devarajan	
J U L	20	25	Soundaryapooja	Madhu, Jayabharathi	B. K. Pottekkad	M. S. Baburaj	
A U G	3	26	Swapnam	Madhu, Nanditha Bose, Sudheer	Babu Nanthankodu	Salil Chowdhary	
A U G	3	27	Mazhakaaru	Madhu, Kanakadurga	P. N. Menon	G. Devarajan	
A U G	3	28	Urvashi Bharathi	Prem Nazir, Jayabharathi	Thikkurissy Sukumaran Nair	V. Dakshinamoorthy	
A U G	17	29	Kattuvithachavan	Ummer, Thikkurissy Sukumaran Nair, Prema	Rev Suvi	PeterReuben	
A U G	17	30	Thenaruvi	Prem Nazir, Adoor Bhasi	Kunchacko	G. Devarajan	
S E P	1	31	Kaadu	Madhu, Vijayashree	P. Subramaniam	Vedpal Verma	
S E P	7	32	Pavangal Pennungal	Prem Nazir, Adoor Bhasi	Kunchacko	G. Devarajan	
S E P	8	33	Nakhangal	Madhu, Jayabharathi	A. Vincent	G. Devarajan	
S E P	9	34	Pachanottukal	Prem Nazir, Vijayasree	A. B. Raj	M. K. Arjunan	
S E P	21	35	Dharmayudham	Prem Nazir, Srividya	A. Vincent	G. Devarajan	
S E P	28	36	Prethangalude Thazhvara	Raghavan, Vijayashree	P. Venu	G. Devarajan	
S E P	28	37	Chukku	Madhu, Sheela	K. S. Sethumadhavan	G. Devarajan	
O C T	5	38	Sasthram Jayichu Manushyan Thottu	Prem Nazir, Jayabharathi	A. B. Raj	V. Dakshinamoorthy	
O C T	12	39	Interview	Prem Nazir, Jayabharathi	J. Sasikumar	V. Dakshinamoorthy	
O C T	12	40	Driksakshi	Ummer, Prema	P. G. Vasudevan	V. Dakshinamoorthy	
O C T	19	41	Ajnathavasam	Prem Nazir, Vijayasree	A. B. Raj	M. K. Arjunan	
O C T	19	42	Azhakulla Saleena	Prem Nazir, Jayabharathi	K. S. Sethumadhavan	K. J. Yesudas	
O C T	25	43	Thottavadi	Prem Nazir, Jayabharathi	M. Krishnan Nair	L. P. R. Varma	
O C T	25	44	Manassu	Prem Nazir, Jayabharathi	Hameed Kakkassery	M. S. Baburaj	
O C T	25	45	Poymughangal	Prem Nazir, Jayabharathi	B. N. Prakash	V. Dakshinamoorthy	
O C T	26	46	Maram	Prem Nazir, Jayabharathi	Yusuf Ali Kechery	G. Devarajan	
N O V	9	47	Yamini	Madhu, Jayabharathi	M. Krishnan Nair	M. K. Arjunan	
N O V	9	48	Kaapalika	Sheela, Ummer, Adoor Bhasi	Crossbelt Mani	R. K. Shekhar	
N O V	12	49	Abala	Madhu, Jayabharathi	Thoppil Bhasi	V. Dakshinamoorthy	
N O V	16	50	Divyadharsanam	Madhu, Jayabharathi	J. Sasikumar	M. S. Viswanathan	
N O V	23	51	Nirmaalyam	P. J. Antony, Sukumaran	M. T. Vasudevan Nair	K. Raghavan	
N O V	23	52	Ithu Manushyano	Sheela, Ummer	Thomas Berly	M. K. Arjunan	
N O V	30	53	Madhavikutty	Madhu, Jayabharathi	Thoppil Bhasi	G. Devarajan	
N O V	30	54	Thekkan Kattu	Madhu, Sharada	J. Sasikumar	A. T. Ummer	
D E C	7	55	Chuzhi	Savitri, Salam	Triprayar Sukumaran	M. S. Baburaj	
D E C	7	56	Swargaputhri	Madhu, Vijayasree	P. Subramaniam	G. Devarajan	
D E C	11	57	Chayam	Sheela, Sudheer	P. N. Menon	G. Devarajan	
D E C	14	58	Aashachakram	Sathyan, Thikkurissy Sukumaran Nair	Dr. Seetharamaswamy	B. A. Chidambaranath	
D E C	21	59	Jesus	Jesus, Gemini Ganesan	P. A. Thomas	M. S. Viswanathan	
D E C	21	60	Padmavyooham	Prem Nazir, Vijayasree	J. Sasikumar	M. K. Arjunan	
D E C	14	62	Football Champion	Prem Nazir, Sujatha	A. B. Raj	V. Dakshinamoorthy	
