= Angathattu =

1974 film

- Directed by: T. R. Raghunath
- Written by: M. Azim; N. Govindankutty (dialogues)
- Screenplay by: N. Govindankutty
- Produced by: M. Azim
- Starring: Prem Nazir; Vijayasree; Adoor Bhasi; K. P. Ummer; Thikkurissy Sukumaran Nair; Jose Prakash
- Edited by: K. Rajagopal
- Music by: G. Devarajan
- Production company: Azeem Company
- Distributed by: Azeem Company
- Release date: 3 January 1974
- Country: India
- Language: Malayalam

Angathattu is a 1974 Indian Malayalam-language film directed by T. R. Raghunath and produced by M. Azim. The film stars Prem Nazir, Adoor Bhasi, Thikkurissy Sukumaran Nair and Jose Prakash in the lead roles. The film has musical score by G. Devarajan.

== Cast ==
Vijayasree

- Prem Nazir as Kadathanadan Ambadi
- Vijayasree as Aarcha
- Adoor Bhasi as Karuppan
- Thikkurissy Sukumaran Nair as Nangar
- K. P. Ummer as Thacholi Ambu
- Sankaradi as Kochukuruppu
- Kaviyoor Ponnamma as Kunjukutty
- Jose Prakash
- Sreelatha Namboothiri as Malu
- T. S. Muthaiah as Choyi
- Paul Vengola
- Bahadoor as Chandunni
- Sadhana
- Kaduvakulam Antony as Transilater
- N. Govindankutty as Panacheri kuruppu
- Paravoor Bharathan
- Meena as Kaavu
- Usharani as Chinnu

== Soundtrack ==
The music was composed by G. Devarajan and the lyrics were written by Vayalar Ramavarma.

No.	Song	Singers	Lyrics	Length
1	"Allimalarkkaavil"	P. Madhuri	Vayalar Ramavarma	
2	"Anganamar Moule"	K. J. Yesudas	Vayalar Ramavarma	
3	"Ankathattukaluyarnna Naadu"	P. Leela, P. Madhuri, Ayiroor Sadasivan	Vayalar Ramavarma	
4	"Swapnalekhe Ninte"	P. Jayachandran, P. Madhuri	Vayalar Ramavarma	
5	"Thankappavan Kinnam"	P. Madhuri	Vayalar Ramavarma	
6	"Valluvanaattile"	K. J. Yesudas, P. Madhuri	Vayalar Ramavarma	
