= Rakthapushpam =

- Directed by: J. Sasikumar
- Written by: K. P. Kottarakkara
- Screenplay by: K. P. Kottarakkara
- Produced by: K. P. Kottarakkara
- Starring: Prem Nazir; Vijayasree; Sadhana; KR Savithri
- Cinematography: P. B. Mani
- Edited by: K. Sankunni
- Music by: M. K. Arjunan
- Production company: Ganesh Pictures
- Distributed by: Ganesh Pictures
- Release date: 17 July 1970
- Country: India
- Language: Malayalam

Rakthapushpam is a 1970 Indian Malayalam-language film directed by J. Sasikumar and produced by K. P. Kottarakkara. The film stars Prem Nazir, Vijayasree, Sadhana and K. R. Savithri in the lead roles. The film has musical score by M. K. Arjunan.

== Cast ==
- Prem Nazir as Shivan
- Vijayasree as Rani
- Sadhana as Devi
- K. R. Savithri
- K. P. Ummer as Kurup
- Sankaradi as Pisharady
- Prema as Valli
- Adoor Bhasi as Burma Nanappan
- Kunchan as Jambu
- Meena as Mankamma
- Govindankutty as Kannan
- Padmanjali as Gouri
- Rajkumar as Balan
- Kamala as Rajamma
- Santo Krishnan as Santo
- Jose Prakash as Mooppan

== Soundtrack ==
The music was composed by M. K. Arjunan and the lyrics were written by Sreekumaran Thampi.

No.	Song	Singers	Lyrics	Length (m:ss)
1	"Kaashithettipoovinoru"	S. Janaki, Chorus	Sreekumaran Thampi	
2	"Malarambanarinjilla"	S. Janaki, P. Jayachandran	Sreekumaran Thampi	
3	"Neelakkuda Nivarthi"	K. J. Yesudas	Sreekumaran Thampi	
4	"Orothullichorakkum"	P. Leela, Chorus, C. O. Anto	Sreekumaran Thampi	
5	"Sindoorappottuthottu"	K. J. Yesudas	Sreekumaran Thampi	
6	"Thakkaalippazhakkavilil"	K. J. Yesudas, P. Madhuri	Sreekumaran Thampi	
7	"Varoo Panineeru Tharoo"	K. J. Yesudas	Sreekumaran Thampi	
