= Alakal =

1974 film

- Directed by: M. D. Mathews
- Written by: M. D. Mathew; A. Sheriff (dialogues)
- Screenplay by: A. Sheriff
- Produced by: M. D. Mathew
- Starring: Rajesh; Vijayasree; Adoor Bhasi; Pattom Sadan
- Cinematography: Vipin Das
- Edited by: R. G. Radhakrishnan
- Music by: V. Dakshinamoorthy
- Production company: Merry Films
- Distributed by: Merry Films
- Release date: 7 June 1974
- Country: India
- Language: Malayalam

Alakal is a 1974 Indian Malayalam film, directed and produced by M. D. Mathews. The film stars Rajesh, Vijayasree, Adoor Bhasi and Pattom Sadan in the lead roles. The film had musical score by V. Dakshinamoorthy.

== Cast ==
- Rajesh
- Vijayasree
- Adoor Bhasi
- Pattom Sadan
- Sankaradi
- T. R. Omana
- Paul Vengola
- Dr. Chinnayyan
- Kavitha
- Leela
- Meena
- P. O. Thomas
- Shyamkumar

== Soundtrack ==
The music was composed by V. Dakshinamoorthy and the lyrics were written by Mankombu Gopalakrishnan.

No.	Song	Singers	Lyrics	Length (m:ss)
1	"Ashtamipoothinkale"	K. J. Yesudas	Mankombu Gopalakrishnan	
2	"Chandanakkuri Chaarthi"	K. J. Yesudas, S. Janaki, Ayiroor Sadasivan	Mankombu Gopalakrishnan	
3	"Pournami Chandrikayil"	S. Janaki	Mankombu Gopalakrishnan	
4	"Premanubhoothiyumaayennil"	P. Leela	Mankombu Gopalakrishnan	
5	"Vaassanakkulirumay"	K. J. Yesudas	Mankombu Gopalakrishnan	
