= Ajnathavasam =

Ajnaathavasam
- Directed by: AB Raj
- Written by: K. P. Kottarakkara
- Screenplay by: K. P. Kottarakkara
- Produced by: K. P. Kottarakkara
- Starring: Prem Nazir; Vijayasree; Adoor Bhasi; Jose Prakash
- Cinematography: Mohan; J. G. Vijayam
- Edited by: K. Sankunni
- Music by: M. K. Arjunan
- Production company: Ganesh Pictures
- Distributed by: Ganesh Pictures
- Release date: 19 October 1973
- Country: India
- Language: Malayalam

Ajnaathavasam is a 1973 Indian Malayalam film directed by A. B. Raj and produced by K. P. Kottarakkara. The film stars Prem Nazir, Vijayasree, Adoor Bhasi and Jose Prakash in the lead roles. The film has musical score by M. K. Arjunan.

== Cast ==
- Prem Nazir as Ravindran
- Vijayasree as Kunjulakshmi
- Adoor Bhasi as Minnal
- Jose Prakash as Jayaraj
- Prema as Rajamma
- Sankaradi as Kochuraman
- Paul Vengola as Geetha's Father
- C. R. Lakshmi as Ravi's mother
- Manjeri Chandran as Manager
- Kaduvakulam Antony as Director London
- Khadeeja as Mrs. Rajeswari Simon
- Kunchan as Hippy Ram Ram
- N. Govindankutty as R. K. Chittoor
- Paravoor Bharathan as Hotel Boy
- Rani Chandra as Kamala
- Sadhana as Bindu
- Santo Krishnan as Jayaraj's henchman
- Sankar as Madhavan
- Sujatha as Geetha
- V. M. K. Nair as Jayaraj's henchman

== Soundtrack ==
The music was composed by M. K. Arjunan and the lyrics were written by Sreekumaran Thampi.

No.	Song	Singers	Lyrics	Length (m:ss)
1	"Ambili Naalam"	K. J. Yesudas	Sreekumaran Thampi	
2	"Kaaverippoompattanathil"	P. Leela, K. P. Brahmanandan	Sreekumaran Thampi	
3	"Kochuraama Karinkaalee"	K. J. Yesudas, Ayiroor Sadasivan, B. Vasantha	Sreekumaran Thampi	
4	"Muthukilungi Manimuthu Kilungi"	P. Jayachandran	Sreekumaran Thampi	
5	"Thaazhampoo Mullappoo"	L. R. Eeswari	Sreekumaran Thampi	
6	"Udayasoubhagyathaarakayo"	K. J. Yesudas, S. Janaki, Ayiroor Sadasivan	Sreekumaran Thampi	
