= Padmavyooham (1973 film) =

- Directed by: J. Sasikumar
- Written by: J. Sasikumar; S. L. Puram Sadanandan (dialogues)
- Screenplay by: S. L. Puram Sadanandan
- Produced by: C. C. Baby; V. M. Chandi
- Starring: Prem Nazir; Vijayasree; Sukumari; Adoor Bhasi; Jose Prakash
- Cinematography: T. N. Krishnankutty Nair
- Music by: M. K. Arjunan
- Production company: MS Productions
- Distributed by: MS Productions
- Release date: 21 December 1973
- Country: India
- Language: Malayalam

Padmavyooham is a 1973 Indian Malayalam-language film directed by J. Sasikumar and produced by C. C. Baby and V. M. Chandi. The film stars Prem Nazir, Vijayasree, Sukumari, Adoor Bhasi and Jose Prakash. The film has musical score by M. K. Arjunan.

== Cast ==
- Prem Nazir as Stephen
- Vijayasree as Jaya, Rani (Double role)
- Vincent as Sunny
- Sukumari as Maaya
- Adoor Bhasi as Pathrose
- Jose Prakash as Mathachan
- Prema as Rosamma
- Baby Sumathi as Leenamol
- Bahadoor as Paulose
- Kottarakkara Sreedharan Nair as Ummachan
- Meena as Anappara Kunjamma
- Philomina as Raheal
- Sadhana as Chinnamma
- N Govindankutty as Philip
- Khadeeja as Ealiyamma

== Soundtrack ==
The music was composed by M. K. Arjunan, with lyrics written by Sreekumaran Thampi.

No.	Song	Singers	Lyrics	Length (m:ss)
1	"Aadaaminte Santhathikal"	S. Janaki	Sreekumaran Thampi	
2	"Aattum Manammele"	P. Madhuri, K. P. Brahmanandan, Chorus	Sreekumaran Thampi	
3	"Kuyilinte Maninaadam"	K. J. Yesudas	Sreekumaran Thampi	
4	"Nakshathrakkannulla"	K. J. Yesudas	Sreekumaran Thampi	
5	"Paalaruvikkarayil"	K. J. Yesudas	Sreekumaran Thampi	
6	"Panchavadiyile"	P. Jayachandran, P. Leela	Sreekumaran Thampi	
7	"Sindoorakiranamaay"	K. J. Yesudas, P. Madhuri	Sreekumaran Thampi	
