= Paravoor Bharathan =

Indian actor

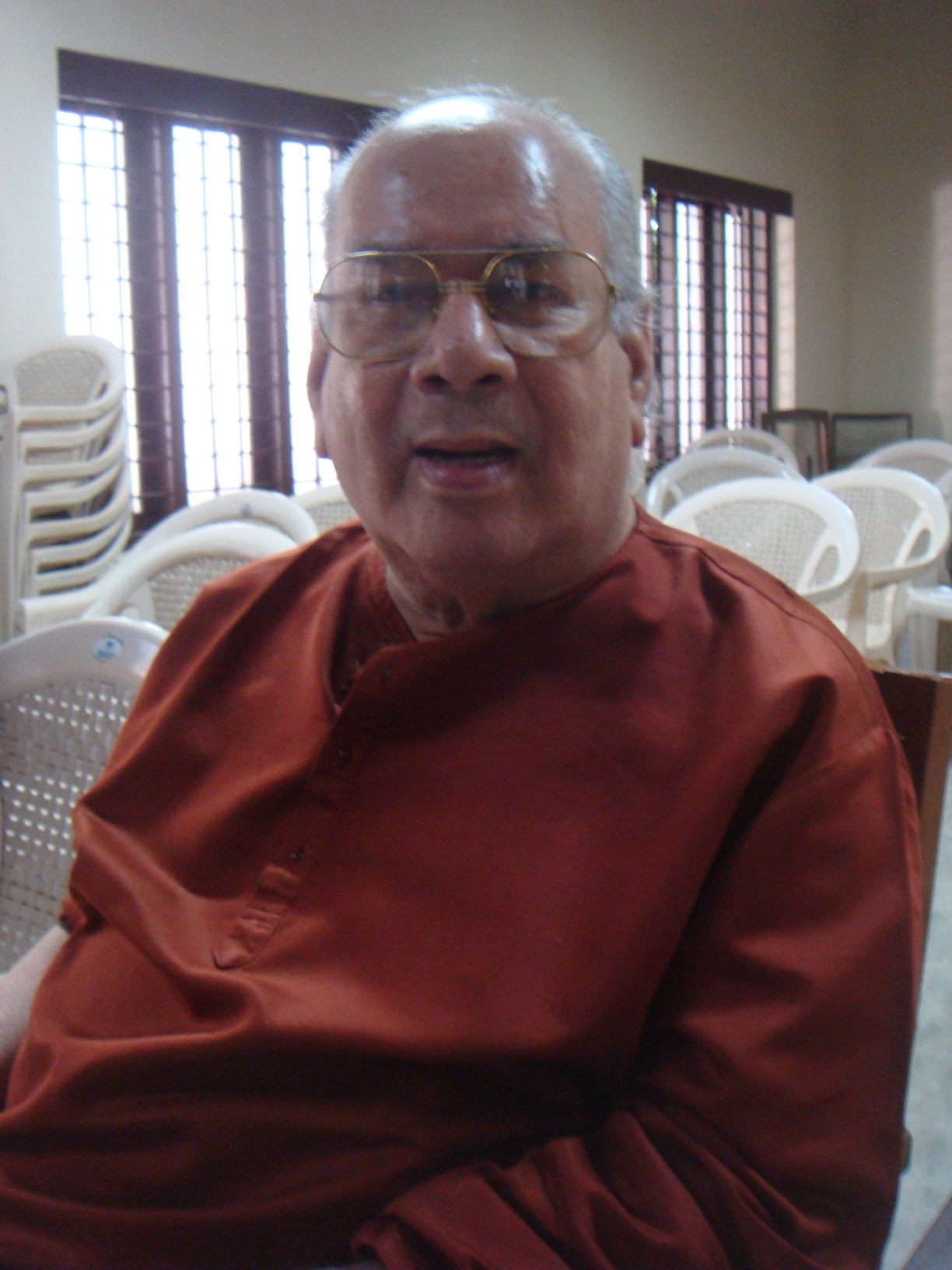
- Born: Vadakkekarayil Koran Bharathan; 16 January 1929; Vavakkad, Travancore
- Died: 19 August 2015 (aged 86); North Paravur, Kerala, India
- Spouse: Thankamani
- Children: 4
- Parent(s): V. K. Koran; Kurumbakutty

Vadakkekarayil Koran Bharathan (16 January 1929- 19 August 2015), better known as Paravoor Bharatan was an Indian actor who worked in Malayalam films. He started his career in movies during the 1950s. Bharathan was known as a versatile actor and played a variety of roles including negative roles, character roles and comedy roles.

== Life ==
Bharathan was born on 16 January 1929, to Kurumbakutty and V. K. Koran, son of Kochannan of the Vadakkekarayil house at Vavakkad, Moothakunnam in North Paravoor, Cochin.

Bharathan attended S. N. M. High School in Moothakunnam. Following the death of his father during his childhood, he was unable to continue his formal education. He was subsequently raised by his mother.

He used to act during his school days as well. On one occasion, he caught the eye of Kedamangalam Sadanandan, a noted Kathaprasangam artiste, who introduced him to the state troupe - Pushpitha during mid-1940s. He started acting in stage shows in and around Paravoor. He has also performed dramas in actor Jose Prakash's drama troupe.

When the play Rakthabandham was being made into a film, Vijayabhanu recommended Bharathan's name for a role. The movie released in 1951 and was directed by Vel Swamy. It had Cherthala Vasudeva Kurup, Ambalapuzha Meenakshi, S. D. Subbiah and others in main roles. Bharathan went on to act in films like Kerala Kesari and Marumakal.

Bharathan spent a good amount of his early life as a stage actor. The turning point was his comic role in the play Maattoli in the early 50s. Acting alongside Bharathan in this play was Thankamani (she played a cameo in Neelakuyil), whom he later married. Parethante Vilapam was the last telefilm and Changathikoottam released in 2009 was the last film he acted in.

== Family ==
He was married to Thankamani. They had four children, Pradeep, Madhu, Ajayan and Bindu.

== Death ==
Bharathan died on 19 August 2015 morning at his home in Paravoor. He was suffering from various age-related ailments and was under treatment. Coincidentally he died on the fiftieth anniversary of the film Chemmeen's release, in which he had played a minor role.

== Awards ==
- 2004 Bahadoor Award

== Filmography ==
=== 1950s ===
Year	Title	Role	Notes
1951	Rakthabandham		
1951	Kerala Kesari		
1952	Marumakal		

=== 1960s ===
Year	Title	Role	Notes
1961	Bhakta Kuchela		
1961	Unniyarcha		
1961	Christmas Rathri	Porinchu	
1962	Kalpadukal		
1962	Snehadeepam	Mohan	
1964	Althaara		
1964	Atom Bomb		
1965	Bhoomiyile Malakha		
1965	Mayavi	Police officer	
1965	Rajamalli		
1965	Kaliyodam		
1965	Kadathukaran	Bhadran	
1965	Karutha Kai	Khader	
1965	Kattupookkal	Vareechan	
1965	Chemmeen		
1966	Kalyana Rathriyil		
1966	Kaattumallika		
1968	Thulabharam		
1968	Viplavakarikal	Sankaran	
1968	Hotel High Range	Vaasu	
1968	Anchu Sundarikal		
1968	Bharyamar Sookshikkuka	Dileep	
1969	Padichakallan		
1969	Vilakuranja Manushyan		
1969	Nadi	Neighbour	
1969	Kallichellamma	Vasu	
1969	Kannoor Deluxe	Manager	
1969	Adimakal	Unnithan	
1969	Mister Kerala		
1969	Velliyazhcha	Velu Pilla	
1969	Mooladhanam	Naanu	
1969	Rest House		
1969	Ballatha Pahayan	Adraan	
1969	Aalmaram		
1969	Rahasyam	Vikraman	
1969	Danger Biscuit	Chellappanashari	

=== 1970s ===
Year	Title	Role	Notes
1970	Kurukshethram		
1970	Vazhve Mayam	Swami	
1970	Ambalapravu		
1970	Mindapennu	Kunjappan	
1970	Thriveni	Mathai	
1970	Priya		
1970	Lottery Ticket	Rajamma's father	
1970	Bheekara Nimishangal	Mathai	
1970	Aranazhika Neram	Kochukutty	
1970	Cross Belt	Kaduva Narayanapilla	
1970	Nizhalattam	Abraham	
1970	Olavum Theeravum	Suleiman	
1971	Marunnattil Oru Malayali	Kariyachan	
1971	Shiksha	Pankan Pilla	
1971	Anubhavangal Paalichakal	Local leader	
1971	Lanka Dahanam	Inspector	
1971	Kochaniyathi	Rowdy Soman	
1971	Thettu	Kurian	
1971	Sindooracheppu	Kittu Kurup	
1971	Inqulab Zindabbad	Head Constable Mathan	
1971	Karakanakadal	Ekkoyi	
1971	Panchavan Kaadu	Fisherman	
1971	Oru Penninte Katha	Raman Nair	
1972	Maaya	Mute	
1972	Punarjanmam	College Principal	
1972	Panimudakku	Mohammed	
1972	Manthrakodi	Bharathan	
1972	Maravil Thirivu Sookshikkuka	Wan Lan/Esthappan	
1972	Sakthi		
1972	Chembarathi	Rasheed	
1972	Postmane Kananilla		
1972	Gandharavakshetram	Govinda Menon	
1972	Iniyoru Janmam Tharu		
1972	Mayiladumkunnu	George	
1972	Vidhyarthikale Ithile Ithile		
1972	Manushyabandhangal	Varghese	
1972	Devi		
1973	Thaniniram	Kozhi Krishnan/Aathmanantha Guru Swami	
1973	Urvashi Bharathi		
1973	Divyadharsanam		
1973	Thottavadi	Madhavan	
1973	Kaliyugam		
1973	Masappady Mathupillai		
1973	Dharmayudham	Appunni	
1973	Ponnapuram Kotta		
1973	Football Champion	Roti Raman Pillai	
1973	Sasthram Jayichu Manushyan Thottu	Sreedhara Menon	
1973	Ladies Hostel	Vakkeel Pillai	
1973	Ajnathavasam	Rajappan	
1973	Kaapalika	Adibharamantha Swami/Antony	
1973	Panchavadi	Manager Kumar	
1973	Nakhangal	John Sebastian	
1974	Youvanam	Mathew	
1974	Rahasyarathri	RR Das	
1974	Thumbolarcha	Kunjuneeli's father	
1974	Angathattu		
1974	Chakravakam	Devassia	
1974	College Girl	Kittunni Ammavan	
1974	Nadeenadanmare Avasyamundu		
1974	Vishnu Vijayam	Unni's friend	
1974	Rajahamsam	Padhmanabhan	
1975	Ayodhya	Kittu Panikkar	
1975	Abhimaanam	Murali's Uncle	
1975	Chuvanna Sandhyakal		
1975	Hello Darling	Sekhar	
1975	Mucheettukalikkarante Makal	Kaduva Mathan	
1975	Kalyaanappanthal		
1975	Bhaarya Illaatha Raathri		
1975	Chandanachola		
1975	Love Letter		
1975	Madhurappathinezhu		
1975	Kalyana Sougandhikam		
1976	Priyamvada		
1976	Themmadi Velappan	Chaathu	
1976	Swimming Pool		
1976	Sexilla Stundilla		
1976	Panchami	DFO	
1977	Yatheem	Hameed	
1977	Anugraham	Rowdi Kuttan nair	
1977	Vezhambal		
1977	Guruvayur Kesavan	Shop Owner	
1977	Ormakal Marikkumo	Narayanan	
1977	Agninakshathram		
1977	Kaduvaye Pidicha Kiduva		
1977	Aparadhi	Raman Nair	
1977	Ormakal Marikkumo	Narayanan	
1977	Chathurvedam		
1977	Aval Oru Devaalayam		
1978	Velluvili	Naanu	
1978	Kudumbam Namukku Sreekovil	Karadi Kuttappan	
1978	Kanalkattakal	Govindan	
1978	Midukkipponnamma		
1978	Bhrashtu		
1978	Thacholi Ambu		
1979	Irumbazhikal	Raghavan	
1979	Ezhunirangal	Sankunni	
1979	Kalliyankattu Neeli	Suryakaladi Bhattadiri	
1979	Enikku Njaan Swantham	Mohan's father	
1979	Vaaleduthaven Vaalaal		
1979	Jimmy	Varghese	
1979	Neeyo Njaano	Sankara Pilla	

=== 1980s ===
Year	Title	Role	Notes
1980	Meen		
1980	Muthuchippikal	Velu	
1980	Kochu Kochu Thettukal		
1980	Rajaneegandhi	Shivaraman Nair	
1980	Ivar	Savithri's father	
1980	Theekkadal	Kochu	
1980	Karimpana		
1981	Orikkal Koodi		
1981	Avatharam	Velichappadu	
1981	Ellaam Ninakku Vendi	Panchayat President	
1981	Sahasam		
1982	Ee Nadu	Bharathan	
1982	Padayottam	Mammootty	
1982	Enikkum Oru Divasam	Chandrika's father	
1982	Aayudham	Menon	
1982	Anuraagakkodathi	Kunjunni	
1982	Raktha Sakshi		
1982	Mylanji	Karim	
1982	Kurukkante Kalyanam	Sankaran Nair	
1983	Mandanmar Londonil	Kuttappan	
1983	Changatham	Swamy	
1983	Kuyiline Thedi		
1983	Iniyengilum		
1983	Nanayam	Bharagavan	
1984	Unaroo		
1984	Adiyozhukkukal		
1985	Idanilangal		
1985	Onningu Vannengil		
1985	Kannaram Pothi Pothi	Murali	
1985	Ambada Njaane!		
1985	Anakkorumma	Police officer	
1985	Avidathe Pole Ivideyum		
1985	Oru Sandesam Koodi	House Owner	
1985	Oru Kudakeezhil	Potti	
1985	Iniyum Kadha Thudarum	Bharathan	
1985	Ee Lokam Ivide Kure Manushyar		
1985	Anubandham	Rtd. Judge	
1985	Janakeeya Kodathi		
1985	Muhurtham Pathnonnu Muppathinu	Dr. Warrier	
1986	Sayam Sandhya	Iyer	
1986	Oru Yugasandhya		
1986	Nyayavidhi	Kochettan	
1986	Snehamulla Simham	Karunakaran Pillai	
1986	Doore Doore Oru Koodu Koottam	Karyasthan	
1987	Idanaazhiyil Oru Kaalocha	Vattoly Thomachan	
1988	Abkari	Swamy	
1988	Ponmuttayidunna Tharavu		
1988	Moonnam Mura	Balakrishnan	
1988	Janmandharam	Kittu	
1988	Pattanapravesham	Prof. Vidyadharan	
1989	Kodungallur Bhagavathi		
1989	Jagratha	Producer Thomas	
1989	Mrugaya	Pillai	
1989	Mudra	SP Bhargavan Menon IPS	
1989	Mazhavilkavadi	Vasu	
1989	Peruvannapurathe Visheshangal	Kalari Gurukkal	

=== 1990s ===
Year	Title	Role	Notes
1990	His Highness Abdullah	Kunjikrishna Menon	
1990	Vidhyarambham	Govindan Nair	
1990	Pavam Pavam Rajakumaran	Broker Narayanan Nair	
1990	Marupuram	Kannappan	
1990	Kalikkalam	Krishnettan	
1990	Shubhayathra	Balachandran	
1990	Kadathanadan Ambadi	Unni Kurup	
1990	Dr. Pasupathy	Kurup	
1990	Nammude Naadu	Govinda Kuruppu	
1990	Thalayanamanthram	Contractor	
1990	In Harihar Nagar	Maya's grandfather	
1990	Varthamanakaalam	Thommachan	
1990	Sasneham	Narayana Iyer	
1990	Gajakesariyogam	Khader	
1991	Aakasha Kottayile Sultan	Raghavan Nair	
1991	Ennum Nanmakal	Velandi	
1991	Amina Tailors	Vaasu	
1991	Pookkalam Varavayi	Bus Driver	
1991	Ottayal Pattalam	Police Officer	
1991	Kanalkkattu		
1991	Ganamela	K. S. Pillai	
1991	Godfather	Anappara Parasuraman	
1991	Mookkilyarajyathu	Oomen	
1992	Apaaratha		
1992	Ellarum Chollanu	Mathunni	
1992	Ente Ponnu Thampuran	Bharathan Pilla	
1993	Sthalathe Pradhana Payyans	Minister	
1993	Ammayane Sathyam	Iyer	
1993	Customs Diary		
1993	Bandhukkal Sathrukkal	Appukkuttan	
1993	Meleparambil Aanveedu	Paramashivan	
1994	Varabhalam	Pillai	
1994	Kudumba Visesham	Kikkili Kochamma's Husband	
1994	Bharya		
1994	Manathe Kottaram	Swamy	
1994	Pavam I. A. Ivachan		
1994	Moonam Loka Pattalam		
1994	Pingami	Adv. Basheer Haji	
1995	Achan Kombathu Amma Varampathu	Maya's father	
1995	Aniyan Bava Chetan Bava	Premachandran's father	
1995	Thirumanassu	Nandan's father	
1995	Spadikam	Joseph	
1996	Saamoohyapaadam	Lambodaran Pilla	
1996	Aramana Veedum Anjoorekkarum	Phaelwan Phalgunan Pillai	
1997	Hitler Brothers	Achuthankutty	
1997	Gajaraja Manthram		
1997	Junior Mandrake	'Patti' Menon	
1997	Aniathipravu	Udayavarma Thampuran	
1998	Kusruthi Kuruppu	Mathayi	
1999	The Porter		

=== 2000s ===
Year	Title	Role	Notes
2001	Chithrathoonukal		
2001	Achaneyanenikkishtam		
2002	Swararaga Ganga		
2003	Mazhanoolkkanavu	Varma	
2003	C.I.D. Moosa	Meena's grandfather	
2003	Arimpara		
2003	Njan Salperu Ramankutty	Kunjambu	
2009	Changathikoottam		
