= Detective 909 Keralathil =

- Directed by: P. Venu
- Screenplay by: P. Venu; P. J. Antony (dialogues)
- Story by: P. Venu
- Produced by: T. C. Sankar
- Starring: KP Ummer; Jayabharathi; Sudheer; Sankaradi; Vijayasree
- Music by: M. K. Arjunan
- Production company: Prince Productions
- Release date: 24 December 1970
- Country: India
- Language: Malayalam

Detective 909 Keralathil is a 1970 Indian Malayalam-language spy film directed by P. Venu and produced by T. C. Sankar. The film stars Jayabharathi, KP Ummer, Sudheer, Vijayasree, Hemalatha, Sankaradi and Sreelatha Namboothiri. The film had musical score by M. K. Arjunan.

== Cast ==
- Jayabharathi
- K. P. Ummer
- Kottarakkara Sreedharan Nair
- Sudheer
- Vijayasree
- Hemalatha
- Sankaradi
- Sreelatha Namboothiri
- T. S. Muthaiah
- Sadhana
- Abbas
- Alummoodan
- Girish Kumar
- Junior Sheela
- Kshema
- Kuttan Pillai
- M. S. Namboothiri
- Meena
- Nambiar
- Panjabi
- Ramu
- Shamsudeen
- Shyam Shankar
- Sreekumar

== Soundtrack ==
The music was composed by M. K. Arjunan and the lyrics were written by P. Bhaskaran.

No.	Song	Singers	Lyrics	Length (m:ss)
1	"Maanasa Theerathe"	S. Janaki	P. Bhaskaran	
2	"Manmadha Devante"	K. J. Yesudas	P. Bhaskaran	
3	"Paala Poothu"	Chorus, K. P. Chandramohan, Latha Raju	P. Bhaskaran	
4	"Prema Saagarathin"	P. Jayachandran	P. Bhaskaran	
5	"Rangapooja Thudangi"	Usha Ravi	P. Bhaskaran	
