= Maravil Thirivu Sookshikkuka =

- Poster
- Directed by: J. Sasikumar
- Written by: N. Govindankutty; S. L. Puram Sadanandan (dialogues)
- Screenplay by: S. L. Puram Sadanandan
- Produced by: R. S. Rajan
- Starring: Prem Nazir; Vijayasree; Adoor Bhasi; Thikkurissy Sukumaran Nair
- Cinematography: P. Ganesapandyan; V. Selvaraj
- Edited by: V. P. Krishnan
- Music by: G. Devarajan
- Production company: Rajan Productions
- Distributed by: Rajan Productions
- Release date: 23 August 1972
- Country: India
- Language: Malayalam

Maravil Thirivu Sookshikkuka (transl. Beware of the Blind Turn) is a 1972 Indian Malayalam-language crime thriller film, directed by J. Sasikumar and produced by R. S. Rajan. The film stars Prem Nazir, Vijayasree, Adoor Bhasi and Thikkurissy Sukumaran Nair. The film had musical score by G. Devarajan.

== Plot ==
Jayadevan is a script writer who goes to a hill station to write his new script. He is welcomed by Muniyandi and his daughter Maalu who are caretakers of the guest house he stays in. On the night of arrival, Jayadevan faces some mysterious characters with negative intentions and merely escapes from a gunshot. Next morning he is determined to solve the mysterious happenings going around in the forest as well as an infamous hairpin bend in the area. He meets Kaduva Kurian who owns a jeep and also happens to be a fan of Jayadevan and his scripts. With Kaduva Kurian's help, Jayadevan learns about an accident and the death of a foreigner at the hairpin bend. The natives believe all the accidents happening are caused by the ghost of the said foreign national. Jayadevan and Kaduva Kurian proceeds to meet Mr K B Menon who is a rich Estate owner in the area. Jayadevan was treated unpleasantly by Menon's guards. He decided to write his story with K B Menon as the main villain. However, Mr Menon visits Jayadevan at his guest house to convey his apology for the behaviour of his guards and invites him to his estate. There he meets Indumathi, niece of K B Menon, with whom he later falls in love.

There is also a parallel relationship in the movie with Maalu and Murukan. Marukan is Maalu's Fiancée and works as K B Menon's clerk.

== Cast ==
- Prem Nazir as Jayadevan
- Vijayasree as Indumathi
- Adoor Bhasi as Kaduva Kurian
- Thikkurissy Sukumaran Nair as K. B. Menon
- Ushakumari as Maalu
- Sreelatha Namboothiri as Chinnamma
- T. S. Muthaiah as Watchman Muniyandi
- Baby Indira as Baijumon
- Baby Shylaja
- Bahadoor as Puncture Anthony
- Meena as Allu Maria
- N. Govindankutty as Thampi
- Pala Thankam as Jayadevan's mother
- Paravoor Bharathan as Wan Lan/Esthappan
- Thodupuzha Radhakrishnan as Film Producer
- Vanchiyoor Radha as Valsamma
- Vincent as Murukan
- Santo Krishnan as Gopalan

== Soundtrack ==
The music was composed by G. Devarajan and the lyrics were written by Vayalar Ramavarma.

| No. | Song | Singers | Lyrics | Length (m:ss) |
|---|---|---|---|---|
| 1 | "Kaadukal Kaliveedukal" | K. J. Yesudas | Vayalar Ramavarma | |
| 2 | "Kadunthudi Kayyil" | P. Jayachandran, P. Madhuri | Vayalar Ramavarma | |
| 3 | "Kaduvaa Kalla Baduva" | K. J. Yesudas, C. O. Anto | Vayalar Ramavarma | |
| 4 | "Mooliyalankaari" | P. Madhuri, Radha Viswanath | Vayalar Ramavarma | |
| 5 | "Nencham Ninakkoru" | P. Jayachandran | Vayalar Ramavarma | |
| 6 | "Sahyaadri Saanukkal" | K. J. Yesudas | Vayalar Ramavarma | |
| 7 | "Sooryante Therinu" | P. Madhuri | Vayalar Ramavarma | |
