= Sumangali (1971 film) =

- Directed by: M. K. Ramu
- Written by: Swamy; Jagathy N. K. Achari (dialogues)
- Screenplay by: Jagathy N. .K Achari
- Produced by: P. S. Veerappa
- Starring: Sheela; Prasad; Kamalam; Sankaradi
- Cinematography: C. J. Mohan
- Edited by: S. A. Murukesh
- Music by: R. K. Shekhar
- Production company: PSV Pictures
- Distributed by: PSV Pictures
- Release date: 5 November 1971
- Country: India
- Language: Malayalam

Sumangali is a 1971 Indian Malayalam film, directed by M. K. Ramu and produced by P. S. Veerappa. The film stars Sheela, Prasad, Kamalam and Sankaradi in the lead roles. The film had musical score by R. K. Shekhar.

== Cast ==
- Sheela
- Prasad
- M. L. Saraswathi
- Kamala
- Sankaradi
- Bahadoor
- T. R. Omana
- Paul Vengola
- Khadeeja
- Baby Indira
- Master Vijaykumar

== Soundtrack ==
The music was composed by R. K. Shekhar and the lyrics were written by Sreekumaran Thampi.

No.	Song	Singers	Lyrics	Length (m:ss)
1	"Maanmizhikaladanju"	P. Jayachandran	Sreekumaran Thampi	
2	"Neelakkarimbinte"	S. Janaki, P. Jayachandran	Sreekumaran Thampi	
3	"Nishaageethamaay Ozhuki"	S. Janaki, Chorus	Sreekumaran Thampi	
4	"Pulakamunthiri Poovanamo"	K. J. Yesudas	Sreekumaran Thampi	
5	"Ushasso Sandhyayo"	K. J. Yesudas	Sreekumaran Thampi	
