= Anweshanam =

- Theatrical release poster
- Directed by: J. Sasikumar
- Written by: S. L. Puram Sadanandan
- Screenplay by: S. L. Puram Sadanandan
- Starring: Prem Nazir; Sharada; Kaviyoor Ponnamma; Adoor Bhasi
- Cinematography: V. Namas
- Edited by: B. Satheesh
- Music by: M. K. Arjunan
- Production company: Deepak Combines
- Distributed by: Deepak Combines
- Release date: 6 October 1972 (India)
- Country: India
- Language: Malayalam

Anweshanam is a 1972 Indian Malayalam-language mystery-thriller drama film directed by J. Sasikumar. The film stars Prem Nazir, Sharada, Kaviyoor Ponnamma and Adoor Bhasi in the lead roles. The film has musical score by M. K. Arjunan.

== Cast ==
- Prem Nazir
- Sharada
- Kaviyoor Ponnamma
- Adoor Bhasi
- Jose Prakash
- Sankaradi
- Bahadoor
- Sujatha
- Vijayasree

== Soundtrack ==
The music was composed by M. K. Arjunan and the lyrics were written by Sreekumaran Thampi.

No.	Song	Singers	Lyrics	Length (m:ss)
1	"Chandra Rashmithan"	P. Susheela	Sreekumaran Thampi	
2	"Chandra Rasmithan" (Happy)	P. Susheela	Sreekumaran Thampi	
3	"Maanathu Ninnoru"	K. J. Yesudas, S. Janaki	Sreekumaran Thampi	
4	"Manjakkili Paadum"	P. Jayachandran, P. Madhuri	Sreekumaran Thampi	
5	"Panchami Chandrika"	K. J. Yesudas	Sreekumaran Thampi	
6	"Thudakkam Chiriyude"	K. J. Yesudas	Sreekumaran Thampi	
7	"Thulaavarsha Meghangal"	S. Janaki	Sreekumaran Thampi	
