= Aazhi Alayaazhi =

1978 film directed by Mani Swamy

- Directed by: Mani Swamy
- Written by: Kakkanadan
- Screenplay by: Kakkanadan
- Starring: Kaviyoor Ponnamma; Anupama; Sukumaran; K. P. Ummer
- Cinematography: Melli Irani
- Edited by: G. Venkittaraman
- Music by: G. Devarajan
- Production company: Kalabindu Films
- Distributed by: Kalabindu Films
- Release date: 10 November 1978
- Country: India
- Language: Malayalam

Aazhi Alayaazhi is a 1978 Indian Malayalam film, directed by Mani Swamy. The film stars Kaviyoor Ponnamma, Anupama, Sukumaran and K. P. Ummer in the lead roles. The film has musical score by G. Devarajan.

== Cast ==
- Kaviyoor Ponnamma
- Anupama
- Sukumaran
- K. P. Ummer
- Kuthiravattam Pappu

== Soundtrack ==
The music was composed by G. Devarajan and the lyrics were written by P. Bhaskaran.

No.	Song	Singers	Lyrics	Length (m:ss)
1	"Pollunna Theeyaanu Sathyam"	K. J. Yesudas	P. Bhaskaran	
2	"Poonilaavil"	P. Madhuri	P. Bhaskaran	
