= Manthrakodi =

- Directed by: M. Krishnan Nair
- Screenplay by: R. M. Veerappan
- Produced by: R. M. Veerappan
- Starring: Prem Nazir; Vijayasree; Kaviyoor Ponnamma; Adoor Bhasi
- Cinematography: P. Dathu
- Edited by: K. R. Krishnan; S. M. Sundaram
- Music by: M. S. Viswanathan
- Production company: Selvi Enterprises
- Distributed by: Selvi Enterprises
- Release date: 16 March 1972
- Country: India
- Language: Malayalam

Manthrakodi is a 1972 Indian Malayalam film, directed by M. Krishnan Nair and produced by R. M. Veerappan. The film stars Prem Nazir, Vijayasree, Kaviyoor Ponnamma and Adoor Bhasi in the lead roles. The film had musical score by M. S. Viswanathan. It is a remake of Tamil film Deiva Thai.

== Cast ==
- Prem Nazir as Venugopal
- Vijayasree as Valsala
- Kaviyoor Ponnamma as Saraswathi
- Adoor Bhasi as Karnnadhanan
- Jose Prakash as S. R. Nair/Swamiji
- Pattom Sadan as Ghada Govindan
- T. S. Muthaiah as Bhaskara Menon
- Abbas
- K. P. Ummer as Vikraman
- Kanchana (old) as Dancer
- Nadarajan
- Paravoor Bharathan as Bharathan
- Philomina as Valsala's grandmother
- Sadhana as Rani

== Soundtrack ==
The music was composed by M. S. Viswanathan and the lyrics were written by Sreekumaran Thampi.

| No. | Song | Singers | Lyrics | Length (m:ss) |
|---|---|---|---|---|
| 1 | "Aadi Varunnu" | L. R. Eeswari | Sreekumaran Thampi | |
| 2 | "Arabikkadalilakivarunnu" | P. Jayachandran, Chorus | Sreekumaran Thampi | |
| 3 | "Kathirmandapamorukki" | P. Susheela | Sreekumaran Thampi | |
| 4 | "Kilukkaathe Kilungunna" | P. Susheela, P. Jayachandran | Sreekumaran Thampi | |
| 5 | "Malarambanezhuthiya" | P. Jayachandran | Sreekumaran Thampi | |
