= Orkkuka Vallappozhum (1978 film) =

- Directed by: S. Babu
- Written by: S. Babu; Jayan Puthuvathu (dialogues)
- Starring: Jayabharathi; Jayan; K. P. Ummer; M. G. Soman; Master Rajeev
- Music by: A. T. Ummer
- Production company: OA Brothers
- Distributed by: OA Brothers
- Release date: 3 February 1978
- Country: India
- Language: Malayalam

Orkkuka Vallappozhum is a 1978 Indian Malayalam-language film, directed by S. Babu. The film stars Jayabharathi, Jayan, K. P. Ummer, MG Soman and Master Rajeev. The film has musical score by A. T. Ummer.

== Cast ==
- Jayabharathi
- K. P. Ummer
- M. G. Soman
- Jayan
- Master Rajeev

== Soundtrack ==
The music was composed by A. T. Ummer with lyrics by P. Bhaskaran.

No.	Song	Singers	Lyrics	Length (m:ss)
1	"Hemantha Sheethala"	K. J. Yesudas	P. Bhaskaran	
2	"Kollaathe Kollunna"	K. J. Yesudas, S. Janaki	P. Bhaskaran	
3	"Sukhamenna Ponman"	K. J. Yesudas	P. Bhaskaran	
4	"Swapana Yamunathan"	P. Susheela	P. Bhaskaran	
5	"Swapnamandaakini Theerathu"	S. Janaki	P. Bhaskaran	
