= Amme Anupame =

- Directed by: K. S. Sethumadhavan
- Written by: Thoppil Bhasi
- Screenplay by: Thoppil Bhasi
- Produced by: K. S. R. Moorthy
- Starring: Sharada; K. P. Ummer; Vidhubala; Sukumari
- Cinematography: Ramachandra Babu
- Music by: M. S. Viswanathan
- Production company: Chithranjali
- Distributed by: Chithranjali
- Release date: 28 May 1977
- Country: India
- Language: Malayalam

Amme Anupame is a 1977 Indian Malayalam film, directed by K. S. Sethumadhavan and produced by K. S. R. Moorthy. The film stars Sharada, K. P. Ummer, Vidhubala and Sukumari in the lead roles. The film has musical score by M. S. Viswanathan.

== Cast ==
- Sharada
- K. P. Ummer
- Vidhubala
- Sukumari
- Pattom Sadan
- Prameela
- Sankaradi
- Sridevi
- Sreelatha Namboothiri
- M. G. C. Sukumar
- Baby Sumathi
- Nedumangad Krishnan

== Soundtrack ==
The music was composed by M. S. Viswanathan and the lyrics were written by Mankombu Gopalakrishnan.

No.	Song	Singers	Lyrics	Length (m:ss)
1	"Bandhangalokkeyum"	M. S. Viswanathan	Mankombu Gopalakrishnan	
2	"Neeradagandharva Kanyakal"	P. Susheela	Mankombu Gopalakrishnan	
3	"Paachotti Pookkunna"	Vani Jairam	Mankombu Gopalakrishnan	
4	"Thudikkum Manassile"	K. J. Yesudas, Vani Jairam	Mankombu Gopalakrishnan	
