= Thalirukal =

- Directed by: M. S. Mani
- Written by: Dr. Balakrishnan
- Screenplay by: Dr. Balakrishnan
- Starring: Sathyan; Paul Vengola; C. R. Lakshmi; Chandni
- Edited by: M. S. Mani
- Music by: A. T. Ummer
- Production company: Reshmi Films
- Distributed by: Reshmi Films
- Release date: 1967
- Country: India
- Language: Malayalam

Thalirukal is a 1967 Indian Malayalam film, directed by M. S. Mani. The film stars Sathyan, Paul Vengola, C. R. Lakshmi and Chandni in lead roles. The film had musical score by A. T. Ummer.

== Cast ==
- Sathyan
- Paul Vengola
- C. R. Lakshmi
- Chandni
- Kottayam Chellappan
- M. G. Menon
- Nagesh
- S. P. Pillai
- Ushakumari
- Sunitha

== Soundtrack ==
The music was composed by A. T. Ummer and the lyrics were written by Dr Pavithran.

No.	Song	Singers	Lyrics	Length (m:ss)
1	"Akashaveedhiyil"	K. J. Yesudas	Dr. Pavithran	
2	"Kuthichu Paayum"	A. K. Sukumaran, K. P. Udayabhanu	Dr. Pavithran	
3	"Pakaroo Gaanarasam"	M. Balamuralikrishna	Dr. Pavithran	
4	"Pandu Pandoru Kaattil"	K. J. Yesudas, S. Janaki	Dr. Pavithran	
5	"Poovaadithorum"	S. Janaki	Dr. Pavithran	
6	"Pularippon"	A. K. Sukumaran	Dr. Pavithran	
