= Thenaruvi =

- Directed by: Kunchacko
- Written by: P. K. Sarangapani
- Produced by: M. Kunchacko
- Starring: Prem Nazir; Vijayasree; Adoor Bhasi; G. K. Pillai; K. P. Ummer
- Music by: G. Devarajan
- Production company: Udaya
- Distributed by: Udaya
- Release date: 17 August 1973
- Country: India
- Language: Malayalam

Thenaruvi is a 1973 Indian Malayalam film, directed and produced by Kunchacko. The film stars Prem Nazir, Vijayasree, Adoor Bhasi, G. K. Pillai and K. P. Ummer in the lead roles. The film had musical score by G. Devarajan.

== Cast ==
- Prem Nazir as Rajan, Mannan (double role)
- Sathyan as Rajan's brother - shots of Sathyan used from the movie Kaattuthulasi
- Vijayasree as Neeli/Madhavi
- Vijayanirmala as Sudha
- Adoor Bhasi as Raman Nair
- G. K. Pillai as Vakkeel
- K. P. Ummer as Madhusudhanan
- Sumithra as Ichira
- KPAC Lalitha as Mariyamma
- Kaduvakulam Antony as Lazar
- Radhika as Rajan's mother
- S. P. Pillai as Thulasi's father
- Ushakumari as Thulasi
- Adoor Pankajam as Kotha
- Alummoodan as Swami
- Manavalan Joseph as Swami
- Aryad Gopalakrishnan as Cheeran
- Vijayakala
- Baby Indira as Devi

== Soundtrack ==
The music was composed by G. Devarajan and the lyrics were written by Vayalar Ramavarma.

No.	Song	Singers	Lyrics	Length (m:ss)
1	"Devikulam Malayil"	K. J. Yesudas, P. Madhuri	Vayalar Ramavarma	
2	"Kudikkoo Kudikkoo"	P. Susheela	Vayalar Ramavarma	
3	"Mrigam Mrigam"	K. J. Yesudas	Vayalar Ramavarma	
4	"Naayattukaarude"	P. Madhuri	Vayalar Ramavarma	
5	"Parvatha Nandini"	K. J. Yesudas	Vayalar Ramavarma	
6	"Pranayakala Vallabha"	P. Susheela	Vayalar Ramavarma	
7	"Tata Tata Thaazhvarakale"	K. J. Yesudas	Vayalar Ramavarma	
