= Khadeeja (actress) =

Indian actress

- Born: Khadeeja C. P 1939 or 1940; Perumbavoor, Ernakulam
- Died: 26 July 2017; Vaduthala, Ernakulam
- Occupation: Actress, Film actress
- Years active: 1967–1994
- Spouse: K. V. Mathew
- Children: Vinni, Leena, Sony, Teddy, Sophie, Stency
- Parent(s): Moideen, Pathayi

Khadeeja (1939/40 - 26 July 2017) was a prominent Indian lead actress in Malayalam cinema during the late 1960s and 1970s. In 1968, she acted in Viruthan Shanku, the first full-length comedy in Malayalam cinema directed by P. Venu. She was born in Odakaali in Perumbavoor, Kerala, a Muslim girl who had suffered a lot for learning dance in Kalamandalam. She acted in more than 50 movies.

== Personal life ==
She was born as the second among the six children of Moideen and Pathayi at Chittethupadi, Perumbavoor. Her siblings were Sainaba, Nabeesa, Khasim, Ibrahim and Salimraj. She received her primary education from Perumbavur Government high school, Ernakulam. She was married to K.V. Mathew. They had six children, Vinni, Leena, Sony, Teddy, Stency and Sophie. Khadeeja died on 26 July 2017 due to lung cancer at her residence in Vaduthala, Ernakulam.

== Filmography ==
1. Saat Rang Ke Sapne (1998) as Tribal lady - Hindi movie
2. Shibiram (1997) as Hostel warden
3. Sathyabhaamaykkoru Pranayalekhanam (1996) as Kunjimaalu
4. Thenmavin Kombath (1994) as Aadivasi
5. Bhaarya (1994)
6. Kudumbavishesham (1993)
7. Shankaran Kuttikku Pennu Venam (1990)
8. Aalasyam (1990)
9. Kiratham (1985) as Mariyamma
10. Nishedi (1984) as Mariyamma
11. Vilkkanundu Swapnangal (1980)
12. Lovely (1979)
13. Pancharatnam (1979)
14. Kaithappoo (1978)
15. Puthariyankam (1978)
16. Kudumbam Namukku Sreekovil (1978) as Puli Narayani
17. Beena (1978) as Betty's Mother
18. Pocketadikkari (1978)
19. Prarthana (1978)
20. Varadakshina (1977)
21. Yatheem (1977)
22. Amma (1976)
23. Prasadam (1976) as Sankari
24. Chirikkudukka (1976)
25. Udyaanalakshmi (1976)
26. Sexilla Stundilla (1976)
27. Swarnna Malsyam (1975)
28. Chandanachoa (1975)
29. Chattambikkalyaani (1975) as Paaru
30. Kalyaanappanthal (1975)
31. Love Letter (1975)
32. Hello Darling (1975) as Kamalabhai
33. Pattaabhishekam (1974)
34. Swarnnavigraham (1974)
35. Ayalathe Sundari (1974) as Pushkosa
36. College Girl (1974)
37. Nathoon (1974)
38. Poonthenaruvi (1974) as Anna
39. Maasappadi Maathupilla (1973)
40. Bhadradeepam (1973)
41. Manassu (1973)
42. Enipadikal (1973)
43. Thiruvabharanam (1973)
44. Manushyaputhran (1973) as Kaalikutty
45. Pacha Nottukal (1973) as Mariamma
46. Kapalika (1973)
47. Jesus (1973)
48. Periyar (1973)
49. Padmavyooham (1973) as Ealiyamma
50. Ladies Hostel (1973) as Karthyayani
51. Ajnaathavasam (1973) as Rajeswari Simon
52. Driksaakshi (1973) as Janakikutty
53. Punarjanmam(1972)
54. Baalya Prathijna (1972)
55. Aadyathe Kadha (1972) as Kunjalakshmi
56. Kandavarundo (1972) as Ambujam
57. Sambhavami Yuge Yuge (1972) as Radhamma
58. Myladum Kunnu (1972)
59. Lakshyam (1972)
60. Omana (1972) as Rajamma
61. Devi (1972)
62. Aaromalunni (1972)
63. Lanka Dahanam (1971)
64. Sumangali (1971) as Rathnamma
65. Ernakulam Junction (1971) as Vilasini
66. Yogamullaval (1971)
67. Makane Ninakku Vendi (1971) as Kalyani
68. Line Bus (1971) as Kathreena
69. Moonnu Pookkal (1971)
70. Jalakanyaka (1971)
71. Kaakkathampuraatti (1970)
72. Ambalapraavu (1970)
73. Nishaagandhi (1970)
74. Priya (1970)
75. Bheekara Nimishangal (1970) as Janaki
76. Vazhve Mayam (1970) as Kamalkshi
77. Thurakkaatha Vaathil (1970) as Janakiyamma
78. Aa Chithrashalabam Paranaotte (1970)
79. Sthree (1970)
80. Sarasathy (1970)
81. Vila Kuranja Manushyan(1969)
82. Kallichellamma (1969)
83. Sandhya (1969)
84. Aryankavu Kollasangham (1969)
85. Velliyazhcha (1969)
86. Kattu Kurangu (1969)
87. Kannoor Deluxe (1969)
88. Vilakkappetta Bandhangal (1969)
89. Pooja Pushpam (1969)
90. Manaswini (1968)
91. Punnapra Vayalar (1968) as Mariya
92. Lakshaprabhu (1968)
93. Velutha Kathreena (1968)
94. Laskhaprabu (1968)
95. Thulabharam (1968) as Karthyayani
96. Asuravithu (1968)
97. Viruthan Shanku (1968) as Ichikkavu
98. Madatharuvi (1967)
99. Pareeksha(1967) as Pankajam
100. Chithramela (1967)
101. Cochin Express (1967)
102. Kaavalam Chundan (1967)
103. Pavappettaval (1967)

== Dramas ==
- Inqulabinte Makkal
- Vishakkunna Karinkali
