= Pachanottukal =

- Poster
- Directed by: A. B. Raj
- Written by: Muttathu Varkey; K. P. Kottarakkara (dialogues)
- Screenplay by: Muttathu Varkey
- Produced by: K. P. Kottarakkara
- Starring: Prem Nazir; Vijayasree; Adoor Bhasi; Jose Prakash
- Cinematography: P. B. S. Mani
- Edited by: K. Sankunni
- Music by: M. K. Arjunan
- Production company: Ganesh Pictures
- Distributed by: Ganesh Pictures
- Release date: 9 September 1973
- Country: India
- Language: Malayalam

Pachanottukal is a 1973 Indian Malayalam-language film directed by A. B. Raj and produced by K. P. Kottarakkara. The film stars Prem Nazir, Vijayasree, Adoor Bhasi and Jose Prakash. The film has musical score by M. K. Arjunan.

== Cast ==
- Prem Nazir as Paulose
- Vijayasree as Leelamma
- Adoor Bhasi as Thommi Aashaan
- Jose Prakash as Mathews Muthalali
- Prema as Lovelamma
- Sankaradi
- Paul Vengola as Lonappi
- C. R. Lakshmi as Shoshamma
- Kaduvakulam Antony as Puluvan Thoma
- Khadeeja as Mariamma
- Kottarakkara Sreedharan Nair as Rappael
- Leela as Lalitha
- N. Govindankutty as Anthappan
- Radhamani as Monimma
- Rani Chandra as Rosey
- Sadhana

== Soundtrack ==
The music was composed by M. K. Arjunan with lyrics by Sreekumaran Thampi.

No.	Song	Singers	Lyrics	Length (m:ss)
1	"Deva Divyadarshanam"	K. J. Yesudas	Sreekumaran Thampi	
2	"Karakaviyum Kinginiyaaru"	S. Janaki	Sreekumaran Thampi	
3	"Pachanottukal"	K. P. Brahmanandan	Sreekumaran Thampi	
4	"Pandu Pandoru Sanyaasi"	P. Leela, Chorus	Sreekumaran Thampi	
5	"Paribhavichodunna"	K. J. Yesudas	Sreekumaran Thampi	
6	"Thaamaramotte"	K. J. Yesudas, B. Vasantha	Sreekumaran Thampi	
