= Baalyaprathijna =

- Directed by: A. S. Nagarajan
- Written by: A. S. Nagarajan; Muthukulam Raghavan Pillai (dialogues)
- Screenplay by: Muthukulam Raghavan Pillai
- Produced by: Ammukutti Narayanan, P. N. K. Marar
- Starring: Sathyan; Sheela; Adoor Bhasi; Kottayam Santha
- Cinematography: N. Karthikeyan
- Edited by: B. S. Mani
- Music by: K. K. Antony
- Production company: Jayavijayi Pictures
- Distributed by: Jayavijayi Pictures
- Release date: 30 March 1972
- Country: India
- Language: Malayalam

Baalyaprathijna is a 1972 Indian Malayalam film, directed and produced by A. S. Nagarajan. The film stars Sathyan, Sheela, Adoor Bhasi and Kottayam Santha in the lead roles. The film had musical score by K. K. Antony.

== Cast ==
- Sathyan as Chandran
- Sheela as Kusuma
- Adoor Bhasi as Paappan
- Kottayam Santha as Ammini
- Muthukulam Raghavan Pillai as Omkara Pilla
- Sankaradi as Muthalali
- Rajan as Soman
- Baby Indira as Bala Kusuma
- Bahadoor as Appu
- Bindu as Mother
- K. P. Ummer as Vijayan
- Khadeeja as Parvathi
- Mani Varughese as House owner
- Master Chandrasekharan as Bala Soman
- Master Deenachandran as Bala Vijayan
- Master Shivarama Babu as Bala Chandran
- Pothuvan as Teacher
- Rathidevi as Nalini
- Vanaja as Mallika
- Vasudevan as Shankaran

== Soundtrack ==
The music was composed by K. K. Antony and the lyrics were written by P. Bhaskaran.

No.	Song	Singers	Lyrics	Length (m:ss)
1	"Bharathavamsa"	S. Janaki	P. Bhaskaran	
2	"Innale Née Kuberan"	K. J. Yesudas	P. Bhaskaran	
3	"Jeevitham Oru Van Nadi"	S. Janaki	P. Bhaskaran	
4	"Kittee Kittee"	C. O. Anto, P. R. Nirmala	P. Bhaskaran	
5	"Malaroli Thiralunnu"	K. J. Yesudas, S. Janaki	P. Bhaskaran	
6	"Marathakappattudutha Vilaasini"	P. Jayachandran, P. Leela, J. M. Raju, P. R. Nirmala	P. Bhaskara	
7	"Pottithakarnna"	C. O. Anto, J. M. Raju	P. Bhaskaran	
8	"Suravana Ramanikal"	K. J. Yesudas, S. Janaki	P. Bhaskaran	
