= Jeevikkan Marannupoya Sthree =

- Directed by: K. S. Sethumadhavan
- Written by: Vettor Raman Nair; Thoppil Bhasi (dialogues)
- Screenplay by: K. S. Sethumadhavan
- Produced by: K. S. R. Moorthy
- Starring: Sheela; Vijayasree; Mohan Sharma; Sankaradi
- Cinematography: Balu Mahendra
- Edited by: T. R. Sreenivasalu
- Music by: M. S. Viswanathan
- Production company: Chithrakalakendram
- Distributed by: Chithrakalakendram
- Release date: 22 February 1974
- Country: India
- Language: Malayalam

Jeevikkan Marannupoya Sthree is a 1974 Indian Malayalam film, directed by K. S. Sethumadhavan and produced by K. S. R. Moorthy. The film stars Sheela, Vijayasree, Mohan Sharma and Sankaradi in the lead roles. The film had musical score by M. S. Viswanathan.

== Cast ==
- Sheela as Bhama
- Vijayasree as Kanakam
- KPAC Lalitha as Malini
- Mohan Sharma as Chandran
- Sankaradi as Panikker
- Baby Sumathi as Nalini
- Bahadoor as Rajan
- M. G. Soman as Balan
- TR Omana as Bhama's Mother

== Soundtrack ==
The music was composed by M. S. Viswanathan and the lyrics were written by Vayalar Ramavarma.

No.	Song	Singers	Lyrics	Length (m:ss)
1	"Ashtapadiyile"	P. Jayachandran	Vayalar Ramavarma	
2	"Brahmanandini"	K. J. Yesudas, B. Vasantha	Vayalar Ramavarma	
3	"Maalineethadame"	S. Janaki	Vayalar Ramavarma	
4	"Shilpi Devashilpi"	K. J. Yesudas	Vayalar Ramavarma	
5	"Veena Poove"	S. Janaki	Vayalar Ramavarma	
6	"Veena Poove"	K. J. Yesudas	Vayalar Ramavarma	
