= Sankaradi =

Indian actor and comedian

- Portrait of Sankaradi
- Born: K. C. P. Chandrashekaran Menon; 14 July 1924; North Pavavur Kingdom of Cochin, British India (present day Ernakulam, Kerala, India)
- Died: 8 October 2001 (aged 77); Cherai, Kochi, Kerala, India
- Occupations: Actor; Politician; Journalist
- Years active: 1963 – 1998
- Spouse: Sharada
- Parents: Paravoor Memana Parameswara Pillai; Chankaradiyil Thoppil Parambil Janaki Amma
- Awards: Kerala State Film Awards; 1970, 1971 - Second Best Actor

Kanakku Chembakarama Parameswara Chandrashekara Menon, better known by his screen name Sankaradi (14 July 1924 – 8 October 2001), was an Indian actor. He was a veteran Malayalam comedian and character artist, who had over 700 Malayalam films to his credit. He dominated the Malayalam film scene from the 1960s to the 1980s as a comedian along with Adoor Bhasi and Bahadoor. Later, he switched to character roles.

== Early life ==
He was born to Memana Parameswara Pillai and Chankaradiyil Thoppil Parambil Janaki Amma in 1924 at Cherai, Kochi, India. He had four siblings, Balan Menon, Sarojini, Lakshmikuty and Indira. Later on, he adopted the screen name 'Sankaradi' from the name of his matrilineal family name "Chankaradiyil" by discarding the "-yil" and changing "Chankaradi" to "Sankaradi".

Sankaradi passed intermediate from Maharajas College, Ernakulam. Before entering films, Sankaradi briefly dabbled in politics, journalism and theatre. He had earlier joined the Indian National Congress, but later became a cardholder of the undivided Communist Party of India (CPI). However, he handed in his party card after the CPI split in 1964 and turned to theatre.

Sankaradi joined the trade union movement at Baroda Railways while he was studying Marine engineering at Baroda. He abandoned his studies to pursue a job as a journalist in The Literary Review, a newspaper based in Mumbai.

== Film career ==
A stint in theatre in the mid-1960s in Kerala prepared Sankaradi for his foray into films. After his debut in Kunchacko's Kadalamma, he remained an integral part of Malayalam cinema till his death.

In 1968, he acted in Viruthan Shanku, the first full-length comedy in Malayalam cinema, directed by P. Venu. Sankaradi won the state's best character artiste award in 1969–71. He holds the record for featuring in over 300 films with Prem Nazir.

== Awards ==
Kerala State Film Awards:

- Second Best Actor - 1970 - Vazhve mayam, Ezhuthatha Kadha
- Second Best Actor - 1971 - Various Films

== Personal life ==
Sankaradi remained a bachelor for a long time till he married Sharada in the late 1980s; the couple had no children. He was known throughout his film career by his house name (Tharavadu) "Sankaradi". He died at his home in Cherai at 10 PM on 8 October 2001, aged 77. He was ailing for a while until his death. He was cremated with full state honours at the premises of his home the next day. Harikrishnans (1998), directed by Fazil, was his last film.

== Filmography ==
=== 1970s ===
Year	Title	Role	Notes
1970	Thriveni	Sankara Pilla	
1970	Vazhve Mayam	Neelakantappillai	
1970	Nizhalattam	Kumaran	
1970	Rakthapushpam	Pisharady	
1970	Detective 909 Keralathil		
1970	Nazhikakkallu		
1970	Aa Chithrashalabham Parannotte	Keshava Kurup	
1970	Ezhuthatha Kadha	Shanku Asan	
1970	Abhayam	Comrade Sankaran	
1970	Bheekara Nimishangal	Panikkar	
1970	Lottery Ticket	Velappan	
1970	Priya		
1970	Ambalapravu	Dhamu	
1970	Kakkathamburatti	Kittuashan	
1970	Aranazhika Neram	Geevareeth	
1971	Marunnattil Oru Malayali	Sheshadri/Pathrose	
1971	Vilakkyu Vaangiya Veena	Sankara Pilla	
1971	Poompatta	Kelu Kaniyar	
1971	Anadha Shilpangal	Iyyer	
1971	Oru Penninte Katha	Manager	
1971	Moonnupookkal		
1971	Inqulab Zindabbad	Neerkunnam Neelaambaran	
1971	Bobanum Moliyum	Mammad	
1971	Sindooracheppu	Sankaran Nair	
1971	Anubhavangal Paalichakal	Kochutty	
1971	Lankadahanam	Adiyodi	
1971	Sumangali		
1971	Aabhijathyam		
1971	Vithukal	Achuthan Nair P Bhaskaran	
1971	Thapaswini		
1971	Karakanakadal	Philippose	
1972	Omana	Kunjumman Kochukoshi	
1972	Maaya	Velu Pilla	
1972	Sambhavami Yuge Yuge	Nagappan Nair	
1972	Brahmachari	Unnithan	
1972	Punarjanmam	Ashan	
1972	Panimudakku	George	
1972	Baalyaprathijna	Muthalali	
1972	Chembarathi	Manager	
1972	Aadhyathe Katha	Appu Pilla	
1972	Theerthayathra	Krishnan Ashan	
1972	Sathi		
1972	Aaradimanninte Janmi	Sankara Kuruppu	
1972	Nrithasala	Sekhara/Durodana Panikkar	
1972	Miss Mary	Keshava Pilla	
1972	Naadan Premam	Gopalan	
1972	Anweshanam		
1972	Kandavarundo	Kuttappan	
1972	Mayiladumkunnu	Outha	
1972	Lakshyam		
1972	Snehadeepame Mizhi Thurakku		
1973	Mazhakaaru	Krishnanda Swami	
1973	Sasthram Jayichu Manushyan Thottu	Kottu Kurup	
1973	Raakuyil		
1973	Thottavadi	Kuttan Nair	
1973	Madhavikutty		
1973	Veendum Prabhatham	Sarigama Kurup	
1973	Nirmalyam	Ravunni Nair	
1973	Kaliyugam		
1973	Interview	Govinda Pilla	
1973	Enippadikal		
1973	Achani	Banker Menon	
1973	Azhakulla Saleena	Agausthi	
1973	Aashachakram	Ramu	
1973	Udayam	Raman Pilla	
1973	Manassu		
1973	Football Champion	Ramakrishna Pilla	
1973	Ragging		
1973	Pachanottukal		
1973	Chukku	Kammath	
1973	Chenda		
1973	Thaniniram	Vaidyan	
1973	Periyar		
1973	Gayathri		
1973	Darsanam		
1973	Devi		
1973	Ajnathavasam	Kochuraman	
1973	Chayam		
1973	Divyadharsanam	Kunju Kuttan	
1973	Angathattu	Kochukuruppu	
1973	Nakhangal	Achuthan Nair	
1974	Bhoomidevi Pushpiniyayi	Pachu Pilla	
1974	Vrindavam		
1974	Rahasyarathri	Sankara Pilla	
1974	Pattabhishekam	Pothuval	
1974	Pancha Thanthram	Kuruppu	
1974	Kanyakumari	North Indian businessman	
1974	Pathiravum Pakalvelichavum		
1974	Night Duty	Kuttan Pilla	
1974	Nathoon		
1974	Neelakannukal	Mathew Sakhavu	
1974	Thacholi Marumakan Chandu	Kannoth Moothor	
1974	Jeevikkan Marannupoya Sthree	Panikker	
1974	Ayalathe Sundari	Kuttan Nair	
1974	Manyasree Viswamithran	Vakkeel	
1974	College Girl	Parakulam Raman Nair	
1974	Poonthenaruvi	Issac	
1974	Chandrakantham	Sreesankara Pilla	
1974	Oru Pidi Ari		
1974	Honeymoon		
1974	Rajahamsam	Radha's father	
1974	Sapthaswaragal	Kunju Panikkar	
1974	Alakal		
1974	Aswathy		
1974	Nellu	Damodhara Warrier	
1974	Chattakkari	Mr. Warrier	
1975	Pravaham	Damodhara Menon	
1975	Kaamam Krodham Moham		
1975	Sammanam		
1975	Abhimaanam	Damodharan Nair	
1975	Chuvanna Sandhyakal		
1975	Akkaldaama		
1975	Hello Darling	Pachu Pilla	
1975	Ayodhya	Sarasamma	
1975	Kalyaanappanthal		
1975	Raasaleela		
1975	Aaranya Kandam		
1975	Chandanachola		
1975	Love Letter		
1975	Love Marriage	Major Nair	
1975	Utsavam	Sankaran	
1975	Madhurappathinezhu		
1975	Raagam	Dharmapalan	
1975	Makkal		
1975	Babumon	Pathiru Menon	
1975	Cheenavala	Konthi	
1976	Kamadhenu	Menon	
1976	Priyamvada		
1976	Paalkkadal	Mesthiri	
1976	Sindhooram		
1976	Nee Ente Lahari		
1976	Amba Ambika Ambalika	Fishermen's King	
1976	Anubhavam	Press owner	
1976	Chennaaya Valarthiya Kutty		
1976	Appooppan	Sankaran Menon	
1976	Ayalkkaari	Suku's Uncle	
1976	Manimuzhakkam		
1976	Mohiniyaattam		
1976	Aruthu		
1976	Chirikkudukka	Keshavan Nair	
1976	Light House	Raghavan Pilla	
1976	Surveykkallu		
1976	Samasya		
1976	Prasaadam	Gopala Pilla	
1976	Kanyaadaanam		
1976	Pick Pocket	Krishna Kurup	
1976	Muthu		
1976	Ponni	Nanjan	
1976	Ajayanum Vijayanum	Pilla	
1976	Amrithavaahini	Madhava Kuruppu	
1976	Swimming Pool		
1976	Agni Pushpam		
1976	Missi		
1976	Udyaanalakshmi		
1976	Ammini Ammaavan	Ranger Paramupilla	
1976	Theekkanal		
1976	Panchami	Yohannan	
1977	Thaalappoli		
1977	Anjali		
1977	Yatheem	Khader Haji	
1977	Nurayum Pathayum		
1977	Veedu Oru Swargam		
1977	Agninakshathram		
1977	Makam Piranna Manka		
1977	Amme Anupame		
1977	Madhura Swapanam		
1977	Yudhakandam		
1977	Sneha Yamuna		
1977	Jagadguru Aadisankaran	Moorkkathu Namboothiri	
1977	Guruvayur Kesavan	Komunni Nair	
1977	Varadakshina		
1977	Panchamrutham	Avarachan	
1977	Samudram	Gopalan Nair	
1977	Vezhambal		
1977	Oonjaal	Thirumeni	
1977	Lakshmi	Madhavan Thamphi	
1977	Rathimanmadhan	Kuruppu	
1977	Kaduvaye Pidicha Kiduva		
1977	Vishukkani	Prabhakaran Pillai	
1977	Niraparayum Nilavilakkum		
1977	Ormakal Marikkumo	Chandrasekharan's uncle	
1977	Innale Innu	Nanu Nair	
1977	Minimol		
1977	Aaraadhana		
1977	Sreedevi	P. K. Menon	
1977	Chathurvedam		
1977	Satyavan Savithri	Rajaguru	
1977	Sakhakkale Munnoottu		
1977	Hridayame Sakshi	Kurup	
1977	Manassoru Mayil		
1977	Ammaayi Amma		
1977	Itha Ivide Vare	Sivaraman Nair	
1978	Kudumbam Namukku Sreekovil	Swaminathan	
1978	Aniyara		
1978	Uthrada Rathri		
1978	Vishwaroopam		
1978	Mudramothiram	Swami	
1978	Eeta	Annamma's father	
1978	Prarthana		
1978	Kanyaka		
1978	Madanolsavam	D'Cruz	
1978	Agni		
1978	Sathrusamhaaram		
1978	Manoradham		
1978	Adimakkachavadam	Varkey Muthalali	
1978	Tharoo Oru Janmam Koodi		
1978	Anumodhanam		
1978	Nakshathrangale Kaaval		
1978	Nivedyam	Kuruppu	
1978	Avalude Ravukal	Damodaran	
1978	Njaan Njaan Maathram		
1978	Snehikkan Samayamilla		
1978	Aarum Anyaralla	Naanu Pilla	
1978	Avakaasham		
1978	Premashilpi		
1978	Raghuvamsham		
1978	Aval Viswasthayayirunnu	Thomachan	
1978	Rajan Paranja Kadha		
1978	Adavukal Pathinettu	Shekharan Kutty's father	
1978	Snehikkan Oru Pennu		
1978	Yagaswam	Govinda Marar	
1978	Asthamayam	Swami	
1978	Ninakku Njaanum Enikku Neeyum	Kurup	
1978	Vadakakku Oru Hridayam		
1978	Iniyum Puzhayozhukum	Kurupu	
1978	Ithaa Oru Manushyan	Krishnan Potti	
1978	Bandhanam	Achumman	
1978	Randilonnu	Kuttappan	
1979	Agni Vyooham	Shekharan Pilla	
1979	Kathirmandapam		
1979	Thuramukham	Vasu Mesthiri	
1979	Shudhikalasham	Vikraman Kartha	
1979	Oru Raagam Pala Thaalam		
1979	Aarattu	Vareethu	
1979	Neeyo Njaano	Govindaswami Gounder	
1979	Allauddinum Albhutha Vilakkum	Aboobakkar's father	
1979	Kaalam Kaathu Ninnilla		
1979	Ivide Kattinu Sugandam	Sreedharan	
1979	Anubhavangale Nanni		
1979	Jimmy	Paulose	
1979	Radha Enna Pennkutti		
1979	Ente Neelakaasham	Raghava Panikker	
1979	Rakthamillatha Manushyan	Appayya/Mathai	
1979	College Beauty		
1979	Oolkatal	Fr. Chenadan	
1979	Angakkuri	Ramachandhran's uncle	
1979	Vellayani Paramu	Swamikal	
1979	Ezhunirangal	Narendran	
1979	Choola		
1979	Prabhaathasandhya	Thirumeni	
1979	Edavazhiyile Poocha Minda Poocha	Sankaran Nair	
1979	Puthiya Velicham	Panikkar	

=== 1980s ===
Year	Title	Role	Notes
1980	Akalangalil Abhayam	Panikkar	
1980	Raagam Thaanam Pallavi	Jayachandran's father	
1980	Ammmayum Makalum		
1980	Eden Thottam	Rappai	
1980	Ivar	Susammma's father	
1980	Ishtamanu Pakshe		
1980	Lorry		
1980	Karimpana		
1980	Adhikaram	Bhaskara Menon	
1980	Pralayam	Professor	
1980	Arangum Aniyarayum	Suppu Iyyer	
1980	Moorkhan		
1980	Oru Varsham Oru Maasam		
1980	Makara Vilakku		
1980	Ithikkara Pakki		
1980	Benz Vasu	Pappu's father	
1980	Meen	Moopan	
1980	Muthuchippikal	Kurup	
1980	Puzha		
1980	Dooram Arike	Mani Iyyar	
1980	Pavizha Mutthu	Malathy's father	
1980	Swandam Enna Padam	Usha's Uncle	
1980	Vaiki Vanna Vasantham	Velu Pilla	
1980	Dwik Vijayam	Sankara Panikkar	
1980	Aagamanam	Raman Nair	
1980	Angaadi	Karunakaran	
1980	Air Hostess	Sankara Panikkar	
1980	Aniyaatha Valakal	Sujatha's Uncle	
1981	Sphodanam	Krishnan	
1981	Asthamikkatha Pakalukal	Sankaran	
1981	Oru Vilippadakale		
1981	Ellaam Ninakku Vendi	Ammavan	
1981	Kolilakkam		
1981	Pinneyum Pookkunna Kaadu		
1981	Thadavara	Prof. Gopinath	
1981	Oppol	Kunjan Nair	
1981	Archana Teacher		
1981	Sambavam		
1981	Orikkal Koodi		
1981	Grihalakshmi		
1981	Sanchari	Sankaran	
1981	Raktham	Pillechan ashan	
1981	Thaaraavu	Raman	
1981	Avatharam	Mammukka	
1981	Swarangal Swapnagal	Janardhanan sir	
1981	Tharattu		
1981	Vayal	Kaimal	
1981	Maniyan Pilla Adhava Maniyan Pilla		
1981	Chayam		
1981	Thrishna	Parameswaran	
1981	Vida Parayum Munpe	Panicker	
1981	Theekkali	Krishnan Thampi	
1982	Nagamadathu Thampuratti	Seshayya	
1982	Ethiraalikal	Mammukka	
1982	Kurukkante Kalyanam	Thrivikraman	
1982	Veedu		
1982	Marupacha	Sankaradi Sankunni	
1982	Kakka		
1982	Jambulingam		
1982	Karthavyam	Menon	
1982	Chiriyo Chiri		
1982	Aalolam		
1982	Ilakkagal		
1982	Vaarikuzhi		
1982	Aarambham	Velu	
1982	Enthino Pookunna Pookkal	Kurupp	
1982	Mylanji	Beerankunju	
1982	Njan Ekananu	Ramettan	
1982	Anthiveyilile Ponnu		
1982	Njanonnu Parayatte	Sankaran Nair	
1982	Sooryan	A R C Menon	
1982	Ee Nadu	Kuttyahammed	
1982	Innalenkil Nale	Kannan	
1982	Ponmudy	Kesummavan	
1983	Thaalam Thettiya Tharattu	Velupilla	
1983	Rathilayam	Vasu Pilla	
1983	Onnu Chirikku	Ananthapadmanabhan Iyer	
1983	Parasparam	Appachan	
1983	Aashrayam		
1983	Maniyara	Sulaiman	
1983	Aana	Alikka	
1983	Mandanmmar Londanil	Kunjunni maashu	
1983	Asthram	Nanu Maashu	
1983	Nathi Muthal Nathi Vare	Velu Mooppan	
1983	Iniyengilum	Govinda Pai	
1983	Bandham		
1983	Engane Nee Marakkum		
1983	Oru Madapravinte Katha		
1983	Mazha Nilaavu	Sankara Pilla	
1984	Ente Nandinikutty		
1984	Unni Vanna Divasam	Kurup	
1984	Vanitha Police	Chelleppan Pilla	
1984	Poochakkoru Mookkuthi	Adv. Sankaran Kutty	
1984	Manasariyathe	Sankaran	
1984	Athirathram		
1984	Rakshassu	Sankaran	
1984	Aksharangal	Writer Kumaran	
1984	Unaroo		
1984	Aattuvanchi Ulanjappol	Bank Manager	
1984	Manithali	Musthafakka	
1984	Nethavu		
1984	Arante Mulla Kochu Mulla	Former Bank Manager	
1984	Adiyozhukkukal	Joseph	
1984	Paavam Poornima	Nanu Kuruppu	
1984	Appunni	Adhikari	
1984	Athirathram		
1984	Muthodumuthu	Thekkedathu Krishna Karnavar	
1985	Gaayathridevi Ente Amma	Nambiar	
1985	Avidathe Pole Ivideyum		
1985	Koodum Thedi	Esho	
1985	Akalathe Ambili	Ambili's father	
1985	Nayakan	Murari Dance Master	
1985	Anakkorumma	Potti	
1985	Njan Piranna Nattil	Psychiatrist Varma	
1985	Guruji Oru Vakku		
1985	Onnanam Kunnil Oradi Kunnil	Col. Raghavan Nair	
1985	Pacha Velicham	Mukundan's father	
1985	Ente Ammu Ninte Thulasi Avarude Chakki	Vasu Pillai	
1985	Boeing Boeing	M. T. E. Damodaran	
1985	Mukhyamanthri		
1985	Anu Bandham	Joseph	
1985	Janakeeya Kodathi	Sankaran	
1986	Hello My Dear Wrong Number	Judge Narayanan Kurup	
1986	Koodanayum Kattu		
1986	Ithramathram	K. V. Menon	
1986	Aavanazhi	Viswanathan	
1986	Ninnistham Ennishtam	Doctor	
1986	Rakkuyilin Ragasadassil	Chandu	
1986	Manasiloru Manimuthu		
1986	Vivahithare Ithile	Psychiatrist Dr. Satheesh	
1986	Oru Yugasandhya	Kuttayi	
1986	Thalavattam	Thirumeni	
1986	Nandi Veendum Varika	Chathukutty	
1986	Sanmanassullavarkku Samadhanam	Adv. P. Sreedharan Nair	
1986	Oppam Oppathinoppam	Paramu Nair	
1986	Sukhamo Devi	Rajasekharan	
1987	Kalam Mari Katha Mari	Sulaiman	
1987	Nirabhethagal	Salini's father	
1987	Aalippazhangal		
1987	Rithubhedam	Karunakara Panikkar	
1987	Idanazhiyil Oru Kaalocha	Principal	
1987	Sarvakalashala	Charachara Achan	
1987	Ithrayum Kaalam	Maani	
1987	Cheppu	Karunakaran Nair	
1987	Vrutham	Kaimal	
1987	Swargam		
1987	Nadodikkattu	Panicker	
1987	Adimakal Udamakal	Govindan	
1987	Sreedharante Onnam Thirumurivu	Kumaran	
1987	Sruthi	Keshava Menon	
1987	Thoovanathumbikal	Radha's father	
1987	Ivide Ellavarkkum Sukham	Lazar	
1988	Ponmuttayidunna Tharavu	Madhavan Nair	
1988	Mukthi	Ravunni Warrier	
1988	Ayitham	Vikraman	
1988	Daisy	Teacher	
1988	Abkari	Govindan	
1989	Oru Sayahnathinte Swapnam	Pisharadi	
1989	Padippura		
1989	Utharam	Achuvettan	
1989	Chakkikotha Chankaran	Police Officer	
1989	Mazhavilkavadi	Kuriya Varkey	
1989	Vadakkunokkiyantram	Thalathil Chanthu Nair	
1989	Mrigaya	Shankunni	
1989	Jaithra Yathra	Advocate	
1989	Kireedam	Krishnan Nair	
1989	Peruvannapurathe Visheshangal	College Principal	
1989	Ramji Rao Speaking	Manager	

=== 1990s ===
Year	Title	Role	Notes
1990	Superstar	Swapna's father	
1990	Brahmaraksassu		
1990	Minda Poochakku Kalyanam		
1990	Vidyarambham		
1990	Kalikkalam	Ammavan	
1990	Kouthuka Varthakal	Aswathy's father	
1990	His Highness Abdulla	Raman Menon, Secretary to the Maharaja	
1990	Sasneham	Padmanabhan	
1990	Thalayanamanthram	Thankappan	
1990	Thaazhvaaram	Nanu	
1991	Pookkalam Varavayi		
1991	Kizhakkunarum Pakshi	Ishwaramaman	
1991	Kanalkattu		
1991	Ulladakkam		
1991	Anaswaram		
1991	Amina Tailors	Nair	
1991	Uncle Bun	Ittiyachan	Cameo
1991	Aakasha Kottayile Sultan	Pillaichan	
1991	Godfather	Advocate	
1991	Mukha Chithram	Sunanda's father	
1991	Nayam Vyakthamakkunnu	Sankaranarayanan Thampi	
1991	Ennum Nanmakal	Radha Devi's Uncle	
1991	Sandesam	Kumara Pillai	
1991	Nettippattam	Achyuthan Nair	
1992	Utsavamelam	Thekkumpuram Karnavar	
1992	Thiruthalvaadi	Raghavan Master	
1992	Nakshthrakoodaram		
1992	Kasarkode Khaderbai	Pachalam Pappachan	
1992	Mr and Mrs		
1992	Kallanum Policum		
1992	Adhwaytham	Chief Minister	
1992	Snehasagaram		
1992	Johnnie Walker	Principal	
1992	Vietnam Colony	Insane man	
1992	Aayushkalam	Fernandez	
1992	Pappayude Swantham Appoos	Kurupp Ammavan	
1993	Aagneyam	Ammavan	
1993	Chenkol	Krishnan Nair	
1993	Aayirappara	Priest	
1993	Devasuram	Kuttikrishnan Nair	
1993	Aalavattam	Madhavan Maman	
1993	Ponnaram Thottathe Rajavu		
1993	Sopanam	Marar	
1993	Samooham	Rajalakshmi's Uncle	
1993	Golanthara Vartha	Panchayat president	
1993	Kabooliwala	Tea Shop Owner	
1993	Midhunam	Sethu's 'Ammavan'	
1994	Minnaram	Iyer	
1994	Chanakya Soothrangal	Velu Pilla	
1994	Pingami	Muthappan	
1994	Sankeerthanam Pole		
1994	Moonnam Loka Pattalam	Ezhuthachan Panikkar	
1994	Thenmavin Kombath	Manikkan's father	
1995	Alancheri Thamprakkal	Chekutty Writer	
1995	Mazhayethum Munpe	Uma's father	
1995	No 1 Snehatheeram Bangalore North	Danielkutty	
1995	Spadikam	Judge	
1995	Sindoorarekha	House Owner Pisharodi	
1995	The King	Pillai	
1996	Lalanam	Madhavan Pillai	
1996	Kalapani	Musaliar	
1996	The Porter		
1996	Thooval Kottaram	Advocate	
1997	Oral Mathram	Tea Shop owner	
1997	Aniyathipravu	Colonel	
1997	April 19		
1997	Vamsam		
1997	Aaraam Thampuran	Ezhuthachan	
1998	Meenathil Thalikettu	Durga's Husband	
1998	Kusruthi Kuruppu	Captain	
1998	Sundarakilladi	Malliyannan	
1998	Harikrishnans	Kunjikelu	
1998	Malabaril Ninnoru Manimaaran		

=== Posthumus ===
The 2017 Malayalam film, Varnyathil Ashanka, directed by Sidharth Bharathan shows the reprisal of Sankaradi's character (photograph only), leftist ideologue, Kumara Pillai from Sandesham, along with his party worker Bobby Kottarakkara as Uthaman, and rival party chief Yashwanth Sahai (Innocent).
