= Pavangal Pennungal =

- Directed by: Kunchacko
- Written by: P. K. Sarangapani
- Screenplay by: P. K. Sarangapani
- Produced by: M. Kunchacko
- Starring: Prem Nazir; Vijayasree; Ushakumari; Adoor Bhasi; K. P. Ummer; N. Govindankutty
- Cinematography: N. A. Thara
- Music by: G. Devarajan
- Production company: Excel Productions
- Distributed by: Excel Productions
- Release date: 7 September 1973
- Country: India
- Language: Malayalam

Pavangal Pennungal is a 1973 Indian Malayalam-language film directed and produced by Kunchacko. The film stars Prem Nazir, Vijayasree, Adoor Bhasi, K. P. Ummer and N. Govindankutty. The film has musical score by G. Devarajan. This was Prem Nazir's 300th film and was an average hit.

== Cast ==
- Prem Nazir
- Vijayasree
- Ushakumari
- Adoor Bhasi
- K. P. Ummer
- N. Govindankutty
- S. P. Pillai

== Soundtrack ==
The music was composed by G. Devarajan with lyrics by Vayalar Ramavarma.

No.	Song	Singers	Lyrics	Length (m:ss)
1	"Aalundelayundu"	K. J. Yesudas	Vayalar Ramavarma	
2	"Kunjalle Pinchukunjalle"	P. Jayachandran, Ambili	Vayalar Ramavarma	
3	"Onnaam Ponnona"	K. J. Yesudas, P. Susheela, Chorus	Vayalar Ramavarma	
4	"Paavangal Pennungal"	K. J. Yesudas	Vayalar Ramavarma	
5	"Pokoo Maraname"	P. Jayachandran	Vayalar Ramavarma	
6	"Prathimakal"	P. Jayachandran, P. Madhuri	Vayalar Ramavarma	
7	"Swarnakhanikalude"	P. Susheela, P. Leela, P. Madhuri	Vayalar Ramavarma	
8	"Thuramukhame"	K. J. Yesudas	Vayalar Ramavarma	
