= Dathuputhran =

- Directed by: Kunchacko
- Written by: Kanam E. J.
- Produced by: M. Kunchacko
- Starring: Sathyan; Prem Nazir; Sheela; Jayabharathi; Vijayasree
- Music by: G. Devarajan
- Production company: Excel Productions
- Distributed by: Excel Productions
- Release date: 25 December 1970
- Country: India
- Language: Malayalam

Dathuputhran is a 1970 Indian Malayalam film, directed and produced by Kunchacko. The film stars Sathyan, Prem Nazir, Sheela and Jayabharathi in the lead roles. The film had musical score by G. Devarajan.

== Plot ==
Ponnachan is a scion of a well-to-do family. He is in love with Gracy, who is from a low-income family. Ponnachan decides to marry Gracy despite his parents' objections. After the wedding, he leaves for Madras in search of a job to support his family. He cannot find a suitable job as he is educated, and all available positions are menial. Meanwhile, Kunjachan supports Gracy and her family. Ponnachna's parents marry off his sister Annakutty to Jose, a playboy. As per his pre-marital conditions, Ponnachan's parents transfer the ownership of their property to the names of Jose and Annakutty. Soon, Jose's parents come to live with him and drive Ponnachan's parents from their home. Jose also starts selling properties by getting Annakutty to sign off on property papers. In the meantime, Ponnachan gets a good job and comes home to support his homeless parents and wife.

== Cast ==
- Sathyan as Kunjachan
- Prem Nazir as Ponnachan
- Sheela as Gracy
- Jayabharathi as Annakutty
- Adoor Pankajam as Achamma
- Alummoodan as Kothan Mathai
- K. P. Ummer as Jose
- Kottayam Chellappan as Police Officer
- S. P. Pillai as Kunjavarachan
- Ushakumari as Omana
- Pankajavalli as Rahel
- Kaduvakulam Antony as Paulose
- Vijayasree as Vanaja
- PJ Antony as Maanichan
- Adoor Bhasi as Jose's father
- Aranmula Ponnamma as Kunjachan's mother
- AJ Abraham as Doctor

== Soundtrack ==
The music was composed by G. Devarajan and the lyrics were written by Vayalar Ramavarma.

No.	Song	Singers	Lyrics	Length (m:ss)
1	"Aazhi Alayaazhi"	K. J. Yesudas	Vayalar Ramavarma	
2	"Swargathekkal"	K. J. Yesudas	Vayalar Ramavarma	
3	"Theeraatha Dukhathin"	P. Susheela	Vayalar Ramavarma	
4	"Thurannitta Jaalakangal"	P Susheela	Vayalar Ramavarma	
5	"Wine Glass"	L. R. Eeswari	Vayalar Ramavarma	
