= Thaniniram =

- Directed by: J. Sasikumar
- Written by: S. L. Puram Sadanandan
- Screenplay by: S. L. Puram Sadanandan
- Produced by: Muhammad Assam
- Starring: Prem Nazir; Vijayasree; Thikkurissy Sukumaran Nair; Jose Prakash; Sankaradi
- Cinematography: Durai Rajendran
- Edited by: K. Sankunni
- Music by: G. Devarajan
- Production company: Azeem Company
- Distributed by: Azeem Company
- Release date: 15 June 1973
- Country: India
- Language: Malayalam

Thaniniram is a 1973 Indian Malayalam-language film directed by J. Sasikumar and produced by Muhammad Assam. The film stars Prem Nazir, Vijayasree, Thikkurissy Sukumaran Nair, Jose Prakash and Sankaradi. The film has musical score by G. Devarajan.

== Cast ==
- Prem Nazir as Prabhakaran
- Thikkurissy Sukumaran Nair as Gopalan Master
- Vijayasree as Radha
- Jose Prakash as Mathai/Mathew Philip
- Sankaradi as Vaidyan
- K. P. Ummer as Tank Madhavan
- Sadhana as Menaka
- Usharani as Vasanthy
- Meena as Insane lady
- Paravoor Bharathan as Kozhi Krishnan/Aathmanantha Guru Swami
- N. Govindankutty as Aadu Veladuyhan
- T. S. Muthaiah as P. K. Warrier
- Kaviyoor Ponnamma as Subhadra
- Adoor Bhasi as Vishvambharan
- Pattom Sadan as Sukumarankutty

== Soundtrack ==
The music was composed by G. Devarajan and the lyrics were written by Vayalar Ramavarma and P. Bhaskaran.

| No. | Song | Singers | Lyrics | Length (m:ss) |
|---|---|---|---|---|
| 1 | "Enthuttaanee Premam" | P. Jayachandran | Vayalar Ramavarma | |
| 2 | "Gurukulam Valarthiya" | K. J. Yesudas, P. Madhuri | Vayalar Ramavarma | |
| 3 | "Ivan Whiskey" | P. Madhuri, A. P. Komala | Vayalar Ramavarma | |
| 4 | "Nandyaarvattappoo Choodi" | P. Madhuri | Vayalar Ramavarma | |
| 5 | "Oro Thulli Chorayil" (Replayed from Mooladhanam) | K. J. Yesudas, C. O. Anto | P. Bhaskaran | |
| 6 | "Vigraha Bhanjakare" | K. J. Yesudas | Vayalar Ramavarma | |
