= K. P. Ummer =

Indian Malayalam actor

- Born: 11 October 1930; Kozhikode, Malabar District, Madras Presidency, British India (present day Kozhikode, Kerala, India)
- Died: 29 October 2001 (aged 71); Chennai, Tamil Nadu, India
- Occupation: Actor
- Spouse: Beechami
- Children: 3 (incl. Rasheed)

Kachinamthoduka Puthiyapurayil Ummer known as K. P. Ummer (11 October 1930 - 29 October 2001) was an Indian actor from Thekkepuram quarter of Kozhikode, Kerala, India. He was active in the Malayalam cinema from the early 1960s to the late 1990s.

He was born to T. Mohamed Koya and Beevi on 11 October 1930 in Kozhikode. His first film was Rarichan Enna Pauran (1956). He frequently played the villain opposite Prem Nazir, who played the hero. Ummer was also a character artist from the 1960s to the 1980s. In 1967, he did his first character role in the film Udhyogastha directed by P. Venu. Later he worked in many of Venu's films.

Ummer was a professional drama actor of K.P.A.C. and other troupes. He was a brilliant football player.

K. P. Ummer was the first actor in Kerala to turn down a state government award. The K. P. Ummer Anusmarana Samithi created an award instituted in his memory for the people who contribute to Malayalam movies.

== Filmography ==
=== 1950s ===
Year	Title	Role	Notes
1956	Rarichan Enna Pauran	Saidali	

=== 1960s ===
Year	Title	Role	Notes
1960	Umma	Hameed	
1962	Swargarajyam		
1965	Daaham	Sukumar	
1965	Murappennu	Aniyan	
1966	Kayamkulam Kochunni	Diwan	
1966	Tharavattamma	Suresh	
1966	Manikyakottaram		
1966	Station Master		
1966	Archana	Gopi	
1966	Karuna		
1967	Kaanatha Veshangal		
1967	Madatharuvi		
1967	Aval		
1967	Khadeeja		
1967	Nagarame Nanni	Captain Das	
1967	Udhyogastha		
1967	Chithramela		
1967	Postman		
1967	Ollathumathi		
1968	Love In Kerala	Sankar	
1968	Agni Pareeksha	Gopal	
1968	Padunna Puzha	Ravindran Nair	
1968	Vidyarthi		
1968	Kayalkkarayil		
1968	Lakshaprabhu		
1968	Kadal	Lazar	
1968	Inspector		
1968	Bharyamar Sookshikkuka	Dr Sreedhara Poduval	
1968	Karthika	Bharathan	
1968	Vazhi Pizhacha Santhathi		
1968	Chitra Mela		Segment: Nagarathinte Mukhangal
1968	Thokkukal Kadha Parayunnu	Raju	
1969	Vilakuranja Manushyan		
1969	Kallichellamma		
1969	Virunnukari	Surendran	
1969	Sandhya		
1969	Padichakallan		
1969	Kadalpalam	Prabhakaran	
1969	Urangatha Sundary	Sudhakaran	
1969	Ballatha Pahayan	Rajan	
1969	Mister Kerala		
1969	Rest House	Balan	
1969	Mooladhanam	Madhusudhanan Pilla	
1969	Chattambikkavala	Cheriyan	
1969	Kannur Deluxe	Venu	
1969	Kattukurangu	Chakrapani	
1969	Vilapetta Bandangal		
1969	Rahasyam	Prasad	
1969	Danger Biscuit	Dr. Sudhakaran	

=== 1970s ===
Year	Title	Role	Notes
1970	Aranazhika Neram	Thomas	
1970	Ambalapravu	Appunni	
1970	Nishagandhi		
1970	Lottery Ticket	S. R. Menon	
1970	Dathuputhran	Jose	
1970	Othenente Makan	Chandutty	
1970	Ezhuthatha Kadha	Gopalan Nair	
1970	Pearl View	Professor Stephen	
1970	Ningalenne Communistakki	Mathew	
1970	Vivahitha	Suresh	
1970	Nizhalattam		
1970	Detective 909 Keralathil		
1970	Thara	Gopinathan Nair	
1970	Rakthapushpam	Kurup	
1970	Anadha		
1970	Saraswathi	Vikraman	
1970	Vazhve Mayam	Sasidaharan Nair	
1971	Oru Penninte Katha	Rajan	
1971	Line Bus	Chandrasenan	
1971	C.I.D. Nazir		
1971	Rathrivandi	Willy	
1971	Thapaswini		
1971	Achante Bharya	Vijayan	
1971	Vithukal	Chandran	
1971	Agnimrigam	Raveendran	
1971	Karinizhal	Mohan	
1971	Muthassi	Vikraman	
1971	Shiksha	Prabhakaran/Rajan	
1971	Yogamullaval		
1971	Panchavan Kaadu	Marthanda Varma	
1971	Anubhavangal Paalichakal		
1971	Thettu	Mathew	
1971	Lanka Dahanam	Sekharan	
1971	Lora Neeyevide	Somappan	
1971	Vivahasammanam	Madhavankutty	
1972	Baalyaprathijna	Vijayan	
1972	Maaya	Vasutty	
1972	Akkarapacha	Bhaskaran	
1972	Postmane Kananilla	Madhu	
1972	Oru Sundariyude Kadha	Engineer	
1972	Nrithasala	Jayadevan	
1972	Azhimukham		
1972	Naadan Premam	Ravi	
1972	Ananthasayanam		
1972	Sambhavami Yuge Yuge	Raju	
1972	Kalippava		
1972	Mayiladumkunnu	Rajappan	
1972	Aromalunni	Thampikkutti	
1972	Achanum Bappayum	Musthafa	
1973	Thiruvabharanam		
1973	Pavangal Pennungal		
1973	Kavitha		
1973	Ponnapuram Kotta		
1973	Divyadharsanam	Rajashekharan	
1973	Ithu Manushyano		
1973	Kattuvithachavan		
1973	Police Ariyaruthe	Cheriyan	
1973	Maram	Khadar	
1973	Manassu		
1973	Football Champion	Ravi	
1973	Thaniniram	Tank Madhavan	
1973	Thenaruvi		
1973	Bhadradeepam	Manager Prakashan	
1973	Jesus	Herod Antipas	
1973	Kaapalika	Nair/Alex	
1973	Driksashi	Raghunath	
1973	Panchavadi	Babu	
1973	Ladies Hostel	Gopi	
1974	Angathattu	Thacholi Ambu	
1974	Pancha Thanthram	Menon	
1974	Durga	Kunjikannan	
1974	Thacholi Marumakan Chandu	Kandarar Menon	
1974	Thumbolarcha	Elamannur Madathil Chandu	
1974	Ayalathe Sundari	Damu	
1974	Arakkallan Mukkalkkallan	Ugran Varma	
1974	College Girl	Kunjahammed Hajiyar	
1974	Bhoomidevi Pushpiniyayi	Madhava Menon	
1974	Shapamoksham		
1974	Rajahamsam	Soman	
1974	Ayalathe Sundari	Dhamodaran	
1974	Nadeenadanmare Avasyamundu		
1974	Aswathy		
1974	Nellu	Joseph	
1975	Criminals		
1975	Manishada	Kareem	
1975	Neela Ponman	Pavithran	
1975	Alibabayum 41 Kallanmaarum	Sherkhan	
1975	Thaamarathoni		
1975	Sathyathinte Nizhalil		
1975	Chief Guest		
1975	Ashtamirohini		
1975	Kottaaram Vilkkaanundu		
1975	Thiruvonam	Damotharan	
1975	Padmaragam		
1975	Palazhi Madanam		
1975	Chattambikkalyaani	Vaasu	
1975	Utsavam	Vasu	
1975	Kuttichaathan		
1975	Love Marriage	Raju	
1975	Madhurappathinezhu		
1975	Pennpada	Raghavan	
1975	Boy Friend		
1975	Velicham Akale		
1975	Babumon	Rajagopal	
1975	Cheenavala	Prathapachandran	
1976	Kuttavum Shikshayum		
1976	Nee Ente Lahari		
1976	Aayiram Janmangal	Adv. Sukumaran	
1976	Chennaaya Valarthiya Kutty		
1976	Appooppan	Gopinath	
1976	Rajayogam		
1976	Vanadevatha	Lohithakshan	
1976	Mohiniyaattam	Narendran	
1976	Kenalum Collectorum		
1976	Raathriyile Yaathrakkaar		
1976	Rajaankanam		
1976	Ozhukkinethire		
1976	Mallanum Mathevanum		
1976	Yakshagaanam	Dr. Venu	
1976	Ajayanum Vijayanum	Godhavarma Raja	
1976	Missi		
1976	Yudhabhoomi		
1976	Abhinandanam	Venu Menon	
1976	Ammini Ammaavan	Parameshwaran	
1976	Aalinganam	Dr. Gopinath	
1977	Ivanente Priya Puthran		
1977	Angeekaaram	Madhava Menon	
1977	Oonjaal	Bhaskara Menon	
1977	Aasheervaadam		
1977	Tholkan Enikku Manassilla		
1977	Yudhakandam		
1977	Amme Anupame		
1977	Harshabashpam		
1977	Sujatha		
1977	Anthardaaham		
1977	Veedu Oru Swargam		
1977	Anugraham	Sreedhara Menon	
1977	Yatheem	Kunjahammed	
1977	Saritha		
1977	Kaduvaye Pidicha Kiduva		
1977	Akshayapaathram		
1977	Niraparayum Nilavilakkum		
1977	Aparadhi	Johnson	
1977	Karnaparvam		
1977	Chakravarthini		
1977	Muttathe Mulla	Panikkar	
1977	Hridayame Sakshi	Vasudevan	
1977	Neethipeedam		
1977	Achaaram Ammini Osharam Omana	Nalukettil Sivan Pillai	
1977	Itha Ivide Vare	Vasu	
1977	Kannappanunni	Chandu	
1978	Raju Rahim	Rahim	
1978	Vishwaroopam		
1978	Society Lady		
1978	Aalmaaraattam		
1978	Ee Manohara Theeram	Sankaran	
1978	Ithaa Oru Manushyan	Inspector	
1978	Aazhi Alayaazhi		
1978	Velluvili		
1978	Manoradham		
1978	Orkkuka Vallappozhum		
1978	Anubhoothikalude Nimisham		
1978	Samayamaayilla Polum	Krishnadas	
1978	Kanalkattakal	James/Rajan	
1978	Nivedyam		
1978	Ee Ganam Marakkumo	Kurup	
1978	Aasramam		
1978	Ashtamudikkaayal		
1978	Sthree Oru Dukham		
1978	Kadathanaattu Maakkam	Thacholi Othenan	
1978	Bashpeekaranam		
1978	Hemantharaathri		
1978	Premashilpi	Prakash	
1978	Vilakkum Velichavum		
1978	Yagaswam	Balachandran	
1978	Thacholi Ambu	Kathiroor Gurukkal	
1979	Avano Atho Avalo	Mohan	
1979	Agni Vyooham		
1979	Aavesham	Raghavan	
1979	Irumbazhikal	Chandran	
1979	Mani Koya Kurup		
1979	Kathirmandapam		
1979	Vijayam Nammude Senani		
1979	Vaaleduthaven Vaalaal		
1979	Pushyaraagam	Sreedharan	
1979	Indradhanussu	Menon	
1979	Ival Oru Naadody		
1979	Jimmy	Thomas	
1979	Ente Neelakaasham	Keshava Pilla	
1979	Yakshi Paaru		
1979	College Beauty		
1979	Indradhanussu	Menon	
1979	Krishnapparunthu		
1979	Aavesham	Raghavan	
1979	Angakkuri	Thampi	

=== 1980s ===
Year	Title	Role	Notes
1980	Ashwaradham	Shankar	
1980	Kochu Kochu Thettukal		
1980	Ammayum Makalum	Kurup / Anandan	
1980	Ishtamanu Pakshe		
1980	Dwik Vijayam	Vishwambaran	
1980	Swarga Devatha		
1980	Pralayam		
1980	Kaavalmaadam	Kollapanikkar	
1980	Dooram Arike	Shirley's father	
1980	Shalini Ente Koottukari	Shalini's father	
1980	Aagamanam	Divakaran	
1980	Lava	Rajasekharan	
1981	Kolilakkam		
1981	Sambhavam		
1981	Thadavara	S. P. Chandrasekhar	
1981	Parankimala		
1981	Asthamikkatha Pakalukal		
1981	Oothikachiya Ponnu	Mathachan	
1981	Chaatta		
1981	Sahasam		
1981	Sphodanam	Police Officer	
1981	Sanchari	Mammad	
1981	Valarthumrugangal	Gopi	
1981	Dhruvasangamam	Krishna Das	
1981	Theekkali	Sankarankutti	
1982	Beedi Kunjamma	Sankara Pilla	
1982	Dheera	Sankaran Nair	
1982	Sharam		
1982	Chilanthivala	Menon	
1982	Aayudham	Vishwanathan	
1982	Chambalkadu	Govind Singh	
1982	Shila		
1982	Odukkam Thudakkam		
1982	Madrasile Mon		
1982	Arambam	Khader	
1982	Ente Mohangal Poovaninju		
1983	Surumaitta Kannukal		
1983	Sandhya Vandanam	Ramachandran's father	
1983	Mansoru Maha Samudram	Ranjini's father	
1983	Thimingalam	Menon	
1983	Shesham Kazhchayil		
1983	Pourasham	Rajasekharan Thampi	
1983	Kodungattu	IG R.C Sekharan Thampi IPS	
1983	Bandam		
1983	America America	Capt. R. K. Menon	
1983	Karyam Nissaram	Avarachan	
1983	Eettappuli	Pareed	
1983	Nanayam	Thambi	
1983	Onnu Chirikku	Govindankutty	
1984	Ente Nandinikuttikku		
1984	Nokkathaa Dhoorathu Kannum Nattu	Mathews	
1984	Paavam Krooran	Menon	
1984	Uyarangalil	Santhosh Varma	
1984	Poomadhathe Pennu	Sreedharan	
1984	Ente Kalithozhan		
1984	Veruthe Oru Pinakkam		
1984	Ivide Thudangunnu	Pappachan	
1984	Nishedhi	Madhavan Thampi	
1984	Ulpathi		
1984	Athirathram	Thara Shankar	
1984	Lakshmana Rekha	Col. Rajasekharan Nair	
1984	Manasse Ninakku Mangalam	Raghunath	
1984	Mangalam Nerunnu		
1984	Panchavadi Palam	Jahangir Thatha	
1985	Angadikkappurathu	Dasappan	
1985	Ivide Ee Theerathu	Keshava Kaimal	
1985	Ithu Nalla Thamasha	'Meesha' Vasu Pillai	
1985	Oru Naal Innoru Naal	Thampi	
1986	Manasiloru Manimuthu		
1986	Moonnu Masangalku Mumbu	Unnithan	
1986	Shobhraj	DSP Mohandas	
1986	Shyama	Menon	
1986	Ennennum Kannettante	Kannan's father	
1986	Sayam Sandhya	Sivaprasad's father	
1986	Iniyum Kurukshetrum	Krishnan Menon	
1987	Adimakal Udamakal	Andrews	
1987	Mangalya Charthu	MRG Menon	
1987	Kilippattu		
1987	Swargam		
1988	Dheerkha Sumgali Bava		
1988	Sanghunadam	Thampi	
1988	Ormayil Ninnum	Doctor	
1988	1921	Amu Sahib	
1988	Orkkappurathu	Chacha	
1988	Dhwani	Omalloor Sadasivan	
1989	Maharajavu		
1989	Jaithra Yathra	Nair	

=== 1990s ===
Year	Title	Role	Notes
1990	Kadathanadan Ambadi		
1990	Kshanakkathu	Parvathy's father	
1990	Niyamam Enthucheyyum		
1990	Iyer the Great	G.D. Nair	
1990	Midhya	Nambiar	
1990	Arhatha	Sreedharan Unnithan	
1990	Varthamana Kalam	K. P. Menon	
1991	Adayalam	Shankara Menon	
1991	Nayam Vyakthamakkunnu		
1993	Aacharyan	Priest Alexander	
1993	Butterflies	Bharathan Menon	
1994	Chanakya Soothrangal	Madhavan Nair	
1994	Minnaram	Chackochan	
1995	Sundarimare Sookshikkuka		
1995	Mannar Mathai Speaking	Prathapa Varma	
1995	Keerthanam	Fr. Pulikkottil	
1997	The Car	Advocate	
1998	Harikrishnans	Hostel Warden	
1998	Kallu Kondoru Pennu	Dr. Suresh's father	
