= Ponnapuram Kotta =

- Directed by: Kunchacko
- Written by: N. Govindankutty
- Produced by: Kunchacko
- Starring: Prem Nazir; Vijayasree; Kaviyoor Ponnamma; K. P. A. C. Lalitha; Adoor Bhasi; Rajasree
- Edited by: Veerappan
- Music by: G. Devarajan
- Production company: Excel Productions
- Distributed by: Udaya
- Release date: 30 March 1973
- Country: India
- Language: Malayalam

Ponnapuram Kotta (transl. Ponnapuram fortress) is a 1973 Indian Malayalam-language period drama film directed and produced by Kunchacko and written by N. Govindankutty. The film stars Prem Nazir, Vijayasree, Kaviyoor Ponnamma, K. P. A. C. Lalitha and Adoor Bhasi. G. Devarajan composed the musical score and songs.

== Cast ==
- Prem Nazir
- Vijayasree
- Kaviyoor Ponnamma
- K.P.A.C. Lalitha
- Adoor Bhasi
- Thikkurissy Sukumaran Nair
- Manavalan Joseph
- Adoor Pankajam
- Alummoodan
- Aranmula Ponnamma
- G. K. Pillai
- Rajasree
- K. P. Ummer
- N. Govindankutty
- Premji
- S. P. Pillai
- Sabnam
- Vijayanirmala

== Soundtrack ==
The music was composed by G. Devarajan with lyrics by Vayalar and A. P. Gopalan.

| No. | Song | Singers | Lyrics | Length (m:ss) |
|---|---|---|---|---|
| 1 | "Aadiparaashakthi" | K. J. Yesudas, P Leela, P. Susheela, P. Madhuri, P. B. Sreenivas | Vayalar | |
| 2 | "Chaamundeshwari" | K. J. Yesudas | Vayalar | |
| 3 | "Manthramothiram" | K. J. Yesudas | Vayalar | |
| 4 | "Nalacharithathile" | P. Susheela | Vayalar | |
| 5 | "Roopavathi Ruchiraangi" | K. J. Yesudas | Vayalar | |
| 6 | "Valliyoorkkaavile" | P. Jayachandran | Vayalar | |
| 7 | "Vayanaadan Keloonte" | K. J. Yesudas, P. Madhuri | A.P. Gopalan | |

== Filming ==
Most of scenes were filmed in Gavi, Pathanamthitta, and inside the forest also. While filming a scene in the film where Vijayasree was bathing in the waterfalls, her dress slipped revealing her nipples. The scene was used in the film without her knowledge.
