= Kattuvithachavan =

- Directed by: Rev Suvi
- Written by: A. Sheriff
- Produced by: Rev Suvi
- Starring: Thikkurissy Sukumaran Nair; Prema; Shobha; JC George
- Music by: Peter; Reuben
- Production company: Crisarts
- Distributed by: Crisarts
- Release date: 17 August 1973
- Country: India
- Language: Malayalam

Kattuvithachavan is a 1973 Indian Malayalam-language film, directed and produced by Rev Suvi. The film stars Thikkurissy Sukumaran Nair, Prema, Shobha and J. C. George. The film had musical score by Peter and Reuben.

== Cast ==
- Thikkurissy Sukumaran Nair
- Prema
- Shobha
- J. C. George
- Baby Padma
- Bahadoor
- Girish Kumar
- Junior Balayya
- K. P. Ummer
- Madhavan Kutty
- Muthu
- Radhamani
- Rani Chandra
- Sujatha
- Vijayanirmala

== Soundtrack ==
The music was composed by Peter and Reuben and the lyrics were written by Poovachal Khader.

No.	Song	Singers	Lyrics	Length (m:ss)
1	"Mazhavillin Ajnaathavaasam"	K. J. Yesudas	Poovachal Khader	
2	"Neeyente Praarthana"	Chorus, Mary Shaila	Poovachal Khader	
3	"Soundarya Poojakku"	K. J. Yesudas	Poovachal Khader	
4	"Swargathilallo Vivaaham"	S. Janaki	Poovachal Khader	
