= Veendum Prabhatham =

- Poster
- Directed by: P. Bhaskaran
- Written by: Sreekumaran Thampi
- Screenplay by: Sreekumaran Thampi
- Produced by: M. P. Rao; M. R. K. Moorthy
- Starring: Prem Nazir; Vijayasree; Sharada; Jose Prakash; Prema
- Cinematography: S. J. Thomas
- Edited by: K. Sankunni
- Music by: V. Dakshinamoorthy
- Production company: Prathap Arts Pictures
- Release date: 27 April 1973
- Country: India
- Language: Malayalam

Veendum Prabhatham (Morning Again) is a 1973 Indian Malayalam-language film, directed by P. Bhaskaran and produced by M. P. Rao and M. R. K. Moorthy. The film stars Prem Nazir, Vijayasree, Sharada, Jose Prakash and Prema. It was released on 27 April 1973 and became a success.

== Plot ==
Gopalan Nair works in a factory and struggles to bring up his children. However, an accident in the factory makes him blind. Afraid of being a burden on his young children, he leaves them. Will his 10-year-old daughter Lakshmi and her brothers find their father?

== Cast ==
- Prem Nazir as Ravi
- Sharada as Lakshmi (dubbed by KPAC Lalitha)
- Vijayasree as Sarojam
- Adoor Bhasi as Sasi
- Jose Prakash as Madhu
- Radhamani as Latha
- Sankaradi as Sarigama Kurup
- Veeran as Prabhakara Kaimal
- T. S. Muthaiah as Gopalan Nair
- Bahadoor as Vikraman
- Prema as Mariyamma
- Baby Shobha as Young Lakshmi
- Baby Sumathi as Young Ravi
- C. A. Balan as Pathros Muthalali
- Paul Vengola as Lonachan
- Ramankutty Menon as Kaimal's Servant
- Thodupuzha Radhakrishnan as Supervisor
- Abbas as Drama Proprietor
- Vanchiyoor Radha as Parvathi
- Master Vijaykumar as Young Madhu

== Soundtrack ==
The music was composed by V. Dakshinamoorthy.

Song	Singers	Lyrics
"Aalolaneela Vilochanangal"	K. J. Yesudas, S. Janaki	P. Bhaskaran
"Chukkaala"	K. J. Yesudas, V. Dakshinamoorthy	P. Bhaskaran
"Ente Veedinu"	S. T. Sasidharan	P. Bhaskaran
"Jaya Jaya Gokulapaalaa" (Bit)	V. Dakshinamoorthy	Traditional
"Kumudinikal"	K. J. Yesudas	P. Bhaskaran
"Nalinamukhee"	K. J. Yesudas	P. Bhaskaran
"Nee Kelana"	K. J. Yesudas	Traditional
"Oonjaala"	K. J. Yesudas, P. Susheela	P. Bhaskaran
"Oonjaala"	P. Susheela	P. Bhaskaran
"Oonjaala Oonjaala"	Ambili	P. Bhaskaran
"Raadhaasamethane" (Bit)	K. J. Yesudas	Traditional
