= Budur =

- village
- Location in Tamil Nadu, India Budur (India)
- Coordinates: 13.2371513°N 80.2042054°E
- Country: India
- State: Tamil Nadu
- District: Tiruvallur
- Taluk: Gummidipoondi
- Elevation: 17 m (56 ft)

Population (2011)
  - Total: 1,863
- Time zone: UTC+5:30 (IST)
- 2011 census code: 628574

Budur is a village in the Tiruvallur district of Tamil Nadu, India. It is located in the Gummidipoondi taluk.

== Demographics ==
According to the 2011 census of India, Budur has 495 households. The effective literacy rate (i.e. the literacy rate of population excluding children aged 6 and below) is 62.01%.

Demographics (2011 Census)
	Total	Male	Female
Population	1863	934	929
Children aged below 6 years	173	92	81
Scheduled caste	1160	570	590
Scheduled tribe	30	17	13
Literates	1048	595	453
Workers (all)	1124	589	535
Main workers (total)	679	349	330
Main workers: Cultivators	3	3	0
Main workers: Agricultural labourers	598	286	312
Main workers: Household industry workers	14	10	4
Main workers: Other	64	50	14
Marginal workers (total)	445	240	205
Marginal workers: Cultivators	53	35	18
Marginal workers: Agricultural labourers	359	186	173
Marginal workers: Household industry workers	12	6	6
Marginal workers: Others	21	13	8
Non-workers	739	345	394
