= Mister Kerala =

- Directed by: G. Viswanath
- Written by: Thoppil Bhasi
- Screenplay by: Thoppil Bhasi
- Produced by: Muhammad Assam
- Music by: Vijayakrishnamoorthy
- Release date: 14 March 1969
- Country: India
- Language: Malayalam

Mister Kerala is a 1969 Indian Malayalam film, directed by G. Viswanath and produced by Muhammad Assam. The film had musical score by Vijayakrishnamoorthy.

== Cast ==
- Prem Nazir
- Sheela
- Adoor Bhasi

== Soundtrack ==
The music was composed by Vijayakrishnamoorthy and the lyrics were written by P. Bhaskaran.

| No. | Song | Singers | Lyrics | Length (m:ss) |
|---|---|---|---|---|
| 1 | "Chundil Pushpathaalam" | K. J. Yesudas, P. Susheela | P. Bhaskaran | |
| 2 | "Evideyo Lakshyam" | K. J. Yesudas | P. Bhaskaran | |
| 3 | "Hridayamuraliyil" | K. J. Yesudas, P. Susheela | P. Bhaskaran | |
| 4 | "Kandille Kandille" | P. Susheela | P. Bhaskaran | |
| 5 | "Kannu Vilikkunnu" | P. Susheela | P. Bhaskaran | |
| 6 | "Onnu Vanne" | L. R. Eeswari, C. O. Anto | P. Bhaskaran | |
