= Vijayasree =

Indian actress

Vijayasri
- Born: 8 January 1953; Travancore–Cochin (present-day Kerala, India)
- Died: 17 March 1974 (aged 21); Madras (now Chennai)
- Cause of death: Suicide
- Other names: Snehalatha; Naseema
- Occupation: Actress
- Parent(s): Father : Vasu Pillai; Mother : Vijayamma

Vijayasree was an Indian actress who predominantly worked in Malayalam cinema in the 1970s. She acted in many movies opposite Prem Nazir and also worked in Tamil, Hindi, Telugu and Kannada films.

== Biography ==
Vijaysree was born in a Malayali family, to Vasu Pillai and Vijayamma. Her roots are from Travancore–Cochin (present-day Kerala, India).

Her first appearance onscreen was in the Tamil film Chitthi (1966). Her first film in Malayalam was Poojapushpam (1969), directed by the patriarch Thikkurissy Sukumaran Nair. She ended up being a part of 3 of the 6 movies Thikkurissy directed in his prolific career as a director. She also got to share screen space with the leading lady of the times, Sheela in her debut movie itself.

She gained popularity due to her beauty in the Malayalam film history. She was a contemporary of the popular Malayalam actress Jayabharathi. Her most notable films are Angathattu (1973), Postmane Kananilla (1972), Lanka Dahanam (1971), Maravil Thirivu Sookshikkuka (1972), Pacha Nottukal (1973), Taxi Car (1972), Aromalunni (1972) and Ponnapuram Kotta (1973). In all these films, she starred opposite Prem Nazir and the Prem Nazir-Vijayasree pair created biggest hits in box office. "Theirs was the most successful pair in Malayalam cinema ever, I cannot think of a single film of theirs flopping," said R. Gopalakrishnan, one of the senior-most still photographers in Malayalam cinema. Many of her movies are directed by Kunchacko. At the end of her career, she parted ways with Kunchacko and started working with P. Subramaniam. She also acted in a number of Tamil films but in supporting roles. She had played an important role in Babu (1971), a Sivaji Ganesan starrer, as the pair of Sivaji who is killed early in the story. She had also acted opposite Gemini Ganesh in Chitthi, a hit. Other notable ones are Deivamagan (1970), Adhe Kangal (1967) and Kulavilakku (1968).

Many celebrities praised the beauty of Vijayasree. "She is the most beautiful woman I have ever met", said director Bharathan to his associate, Jayaraj, once. "She was verily the Marilyn Monroe of Malayalam. No other actress had as many male admirers as she had. No other actress had as many hits as her in such a short span of time. No actress had made such a sudden impact in Malayalam cinema. People went to the theatre to see her, and that is something that has not happened before (her time)", said Jayaraj. He directed a film Naayika, by which the character in the movie named "Vani" (played by actress Sarayu) portrays slight resemblance to Vijayasree's life. "If Jayan epitomised the essence in manly beauty among male actors, then there has never been an actress in Malayalam whose voluptuous beauty compared to Vijayasree's. Her graceful statuesque beauty was almost a symbol of God's artistry", said actor Kaduvakulam Antony. Many actors and directors said, due to the bad fate, Malayalam film fans could not see the great Jayan-Vijayasree combination on the screen. "She was extremely beautiful of course, but she was a capable performer too.", said actor Raghavan.

She committed suicide at the age of 21 on 17 March 1974. However, there were lot of controversies around the suicide and many still believe that she was murdered.

Vijayasree loved children with all her innocence, she used to distribute sweets or candies whenever she saw children nearby.

== Filmography ==
=== Malayalam ===
1. Youvanam (1974) as Minikutti
2. Alakal (1974)
3. Jeevikkan Marannupoya Sthree (1974)
4. Ajnathavasam (1973) as Kunjulakshmi
5. Angathattu (1973) as Archa
6. Padmavyooham (1973) as Jaya, Rani (Double role)
7. Panchavadi (1973) as Nalini
8. Veendum Prabhatham (1973) as Sarojam
9. Pavangal Pennungal (1973)
10. Ponnapuram Kotta (1973)
11. Thiruvabharanam (1973)
12. Swargaputhri (1973) as Lisy
13. Thenaruvi (1973) as Neeli
14. Pacha Nottukal (1973) as Leenamma
15. Thaniniram (1973) as Radha
16. Prethangalude Thazhvara (1973)
17. Kaadu (1973) as Maala
18. Aromalunni (1972)
19. Manthrakodi (1972)
20. Maravil Thirivu Sookshikkuka (1972) as Indumathi
21. Postmane Kananilla (1972) as Kamalam
22. Pushpanjali (1972) as Usha
23. Adyathe Kadha (1972) as Rajakumari
24. Anweshanam (1972)
25. Maaya (1972) as Kamala
26. Professor (1972) as Mayadevi
27. Sree Guruvayoorappan (1972)
28. Sambhavami Yuge Yuge (1972) as Sumathy
29. Taxi Car (1972) as Rani
30. Shiksha (1971) as Dancer
31. Bobanum Moliyum (1971)
32. Lanka Dahanam (1971) as Rajani
33. Marunnattil Oru Malayali (1971) as Geetha
34. Achante Bharya (1971) as Omana
35. Palunkupaathram (1970)
36. Dathuputhran (1970) as Vanaja
37. Othenante Makan (1970) as Kunji Kunki
38. Detective 909 Keralathil (1970)
39. Rakthapushpam (1970)
40. Poojapushpam (1969)

=== Tamil ===
1. Chitthi (1966)
2. Adhey Kangal (1967)
3. Naan (1967)
4. Kulavilakku (1968)
5. Naalum Therindhavan (1968)
6. Neeyum Naanum (1968)
7. Deiva Magan (1969)
8. Thalattu (1969)
9. Nilave Nee Satchi (1970)
10. Jeevanadi (1970)
11. Thedi Vandha Mappillai (1970) as a seducer
12. Kathal Jothi (1970)
13. Babu (1971) as Kannamma
14. Yanai Valartha Vanampadi Magan (1971)
15. Delhi To Madras (1972)
16. Kanimuthu Paappa (1972)
17. Maru Piravi (1973)
18. Malai Naattu Mangai (1973)
19. Akkarai Pachai (1974) - Last movie in Tamil

=== Kannada ===
1. Bangalore Mail (1968)
2. Broker Bheeshmachari (1969)
3. Sri Krishnadevaraya (1970)
4. Naguva Hoovu (1970)
5. Kasturi Nivasa (1971)
6. Nanda Gokula (1972)
7. Janma Rahasya (1972)

=== Telugu ===
1. Bhimanjaneya Yuddham (1966)
2. Rangula Ratnam (1966)
3. Manchi Kutumbam (1968)
4. Prema Kanuka (1969)
5. Ukku Pidugu (1969) as Sarpakesi, Nagakanya
6. Jeevitha Chakram (1971)
7. Revolver Rani (1971) as Lilly
8. Kathanayakuralu (1971) as Hema
9. Kiladi Bullodu (1972)
10. Kalavari Kutumbam (1972) as Ruby
11. Dora Babu (1974)
12. Nippulanti Manishi (1974) as Rani
