= Paul Vengola =

- Born: Ernakulam, Kerala, India
- Occupation: Film actor
- Years active: 1967–1984

Paul Vengola was an Indian actor in Malayalam cinema. He mainly acted in comedy roles and supporting roles. He was an active comedian during the 1970s and 1980s in Malayalam film.

== Career ==
He was a drama artist before coming into film industry and had a drama troupe of his own. He had acted in more than 50 films. He was also a film distributor under the banner of Sheeba Films. He worked as a homeo doctor which many people doesn't know.

== Filmography ==
- Manithali (1984)
- Maniyara (1983) as Kunjabdulla
- Vaadaka Veettile Athidhi (1981)
- Benz Vasu (1980)
- Swathu (1980)
- Lovely (1979)
- Kazhukan (1979) as Pimp Vasu
- Kanyaka (1978) as Pachu Pilla
- Balapareekshanam (1978)
- Beena (1978) as Pachan
- Kanalkattakal (1978) as Esperd Kunjapppu
- Karimpuli (1978)
- Varadakshina (1977)
- Madhuraswapnam (1977)
- Sukradasa (1977)
- Rathimanmadhan (1977)
- Aadyapaadam (1977)
- Amma (1976)
- Light House (1976)
- Aalinganam (1976) as Gangadharan
- Omanakkunju (1975)
- Chief Guest (1975)
- Ayodhya (1975) as Pakru
- Mattoru Seetha (1975)
- Ankathattu (1974)
- Bhoogolam Thiriyunnu (1974)
- Arakkallan Mukkaalkkallan (1974)
- College Girl (1974) as Konthan
- Sapthaswarangal (1974) as Pappukutty
- Alakal (1974)
- Urvashi Bharathi (1973)
- Driksakshi (1973) as Kuttappan
- Kalachakram (1973)
- Veendum Prabhatham (1973)
- Shaasthram Jayichu Manushyan Thottu (1973) as Shivam
- Football Champion (1973) as Paulose
- Pacha Nottukal (1973) as Lonappan
- Aaraadhika (1973)
- Ajnaathavasam (1973) as Geetha's Father
- Thekkan Kattu (1973) as Kora
- Maaya (1972) as Antony
- Akkarapacha (1972)
- Aaradi Manninte Janmi (1972) as Ramu
- Miss Mary (1972)
- Kandavarundo (1972) as Themmadiparamu
- Lakshyam (1972)
- Vidyarthikale Ithile Ithile (1972)
- Gangaasangamam (1971)
- Sumangali (1971) as Panchayat member Johnny
- Anaadha Shilpangal (1971) as Krishnankutty
- Poompaatta (1971)
- Vilaykku Vaangiya Veena (1971) as Kariya
- Marunaattil Oru Malayaali (1971)
- Kalithozhi (1971)
- Kaakkathampuraatti (1970)
- Lottery Ticket (1970)
- Vazhve Mayam (1970)
- Velliyazhcha (1969)
- Aalmaram (1969)
- Thalirukal (1967)
- Arakkillam (1967)
- Kayamkulam Kochunni as Moosu Thirumeni
- Archana (1966) as Pakshinottakkaran
- Kalanju Kittiya Thankam (1964)
