= N. Govindan Kutty =

Indian actor (1924–1994)

- Born: 17 October 1924; Fort Kochi, Kingdom of Cochin, British India (present day Ernakulam, Kerala, India)
- Died: 23 August 1994 (aged 69); Thiruvananthapuram, Kerala, India
- Occupation: Actor
- Years active: 1961–1993
- Children: Rekha
- Parents: Sankara Narayanan; Nanukutty Amma

N. Govindan Kutty (17 October 1924 – 23 August 1994) was an Indian actor who worked in the Malayalam film industry. He appeared in around 100 films, acting mainly in villain roles.

== Background ==
Kutty was born at Fort Kochi in 1924, as the son of Sankara Narayanan and Nanukutty Amma. He was a natural actor and was prominent as a villain during the time when Prem Nazir and Jayan were heroes. He had written several professional dramas and screenplays for Malayalam films. He died in 1993.

== Filmography ==
=== As an actor ===
- Sakshal Sreeman Chathunni (1993) as Aazhvancheri Illathu Theekran Namboothiri
- Ithile Iniyum Varu (1986) as Chief editor Menon
- Thacholi Thankappan (1984) as Chandu
- Padayottam (1982)
- Ariyappedatha Rahasyam (1981) as Gopi
- Sanchari (1981) as Vasu
- Naayaattu (1980)
- Idimuzhakkam (1980) as Varkey
- Swathu (1980)
- Paalaattu Kunjikkannan (1980)
- Mamaankam (1979)
- Aavesham (1979)
- Ponnil Kulicha Raathri (1979)
- Avar Jeevikkunnu (1978)
- Njaan Njaan Maathram (1978)
- Kadathanaattu Maakkam (1978)
- Jagadguru Aadisankaran (1977)
- Agninakshathram (1977)
- Sreemad Bhagavadgeetha (1977)
- Vanadevatha (1976) as Thankappan
- Agnipushpam (1976)
- Prasadam (1976) as Keshavan
- Panchami (1976) as Moochaari
- Tourist Bungalow (1975)
- Neelapponmaan (1975)
- Omanakkunju (1975)
- Chattambikkalyaani (1975)
- Penpada (1975)
- Madhurappathinezhu (1975)
- Ankathattu (1974)
- Kanyakumari (1974) .... Veerappan
- Durga (1974)
- Naathoon (1974)
- Thumbolaarcha (1974)
- Thacholi Marumakan Chandu (1974) as Kunjikelu
- Arakkallan Mukkaalkkallan (1974)
- Chanchala (1974)
- Urvashi Bharathi (1973)
- Pavangal Pennungal (1973)
- Ponnapuram Kotta (1973)
- Thaniniram (1973) as Aadu Veladuyhan
- Chuzhi (1973) as Varghese
- Police Ariyaruthu (1973) as Thomas Augustine
- Pacha Nottukal (1973) as Anthappan
- Padmavyooham (1973) as Philip
- Panitheeratha Veedu (1973) as Thankayyan
- Kaapalika (1973) as A.G.Nambiar
- Ajnaathavasam (1973) as K. S. Pilla
- Driksakshi (1973) as Inspector Radhakrishnan
- Maravil Thirivu Sookshikkuka (1972) as Thampi
- Aadyathe Kadha (1972) as Inquilab Pankan
- Preethi (1972)
- Akkarappacha (1972)
- Postmane Kananilla (1972) as Vallabha Panikkar
- Ananthashayanam (1972)
- Sambhavami Yuge Yuge (1972) as Swami
- Lakshyam (1972)
- Lanka Dahanam (1971)
- Sarasayya (1971) as Mohan
- Anubhavangal Paalichakal (1971)
- Shiksha (1971) as Prathapan
- Panchavan Kaadu (1971)
- Ernakulam Junction (1971)
- Vithukal (1971) as Raghavan
- Vimochanasamaram (1971)
- Marunaattil Oru Malayaali (1971) as Govindan
- Raathrivandi (1971) as Robert
- Kalithozhi (1971)
- Ara Nazhika Neram (1970) as Peelippochan
- Bheekara Nimishangal (1970) as Ugran Velu
- Cross Belt (1970)
- Pearl View (1970) as Bastain
- Othenante Makan (1970) as Vadakkumpattu Karanavar
- Nizhalaattam (1970) as Paul
- Vazhve Mayam (1970) as Ramachandran Nair
- Lottery Ticket (1970) as Madhavankutty
- Kadalppaalam (1969) as Karthavu
- Adimakal (1969) as Pachu Kurup
- Susie (1969)
- Kannoor Deluxe (1969) as K B S Nair
- Kaattukurangu (1969)
- Jwala (1969) as Govinda Pilla
- Rahasyam (1969) as Govindankutty
- Danger Biscuit (1969) as Mathew
- Love In Kerala (1968) as R.K.Raja
- Dial 2244 (1968)
- Thulaabharam (1968)
- Yakshi (1968) as Chandran
- Kodungallooramma (1968)
- Ezhu Raathrikal (1968) as Govindan
- Thirichadi (1968)
- Punnapra Vayalar (1968) as Achuthan
- Mainatharuvi Kolakkes (1967)
- Karutha Rathrikal (1967)
- Mulkkireedam (1967)
- Naadan Pennu (1967)
- Pavappettaval (1967)
- Kadamattathachan (1966)
- Christmas Rathri (1961) as Dr Philip

=== Screenplay ===
- Raathrivandi (1971)
- Ernakulam Junction (1971)
- Preethi (1972)
- Aaraadhika (1973)
- Police Ariyaruthu (1973)
- Arakkallan Mukkaalkkallan (1974)
- Thacholi Marumakan Chanthu (1974)
- Durga (1974)
- Ankathattu (1974)
- Rajaankanam (1976)
- Guruvayoor Kesavan (1977)
- Thacholi Ambu (1978)
- Avar Jeevikkunnu (1978)
- Maamaankam (1979)
- Pichaathikkuttappan (1979)
- Padayottam (1982)

=== Dialogue ===
- Othenante Makan (1970)
- Raathrivandi (1971)
- Ernakulam Junction (1971)
- Preethi (1972)
- Aaraadhika (1973)
- Police Ariyaruthu (1973)
- Ponnaapuram Kotta (1973)
- Arakkallan Mukkaalkkallan (1974)
- Thacholi Marumakan Chanthu (1974)
- Durga (1974)
- Ankathattu (1974)
- Rajaankanam (1976)
- Ormakal Marikkumo (1977)
- Guruvayoor Kesavan (1977)
- Thacholi Ambu (1978)
- Avar Jeevikkunnu (1978)
- Maamaankam (1979)
- Pichaathikkuttappan (1979)
- Padayottam (1982)

=== Story ===
- Rathrivandi (1971)
- Ernakulam Junction (1971)
- Maravil Thirivu Sookshikkuka (1972)
- Aaraadhika (1973)
- Ponnaapuram Kotta (1973)
- Arakkallan Mukkaalkkallan (1974)
- Thacholi Marumakan Chanthu (1974)
- Durga (1974)
- Panathukkaga (1974)
- Rajaankanam (1976)
- Thacholi Ambu (1978)
- Avar Jeevikkunnu (1978)
- Maamaankam (1979)
- Randu Mukhangal (1981)
- Naagamadathu Thampuraatti (1982)
