= Sadhana (Malayalam actress) =

Indian actress in Malayalam movies

- Born: Andhra Pradesh
- Occupation: Actress
- Years active: 1969–1981
- Parent(s): Babu, Beegam

Sadhana was an Indian actress in Malayalam movies. She was a leading actress during the late 1960s and the 1970s in Malayalam and Tamil movies. She acted in more than 100 movies.

== Personal life ==
She was born into a Muslim family to Babu and Beegam, as the eldest of six children, at Guntur, Andhra Pradesh.

Her sister Saleema also acted in a few Tamil movies. She is living in small rented house near Budur, Tamil Nadu with her husband, Ram. They have no children. She's absconded according to sources.

== Partial filmography ==
1. Ek Phool Do Mali (1969) as Somna
2. Danger Biscuit (1969) as Gracy
3. Vilakkappetta Bandhangal (1969)
4. Rest House (1969) as Sathi
5. Raktha Pushpam (1970)
6. Detective 909 Keralathil (1970)
7. Kuttavaali (1970) as Shanthi
8. Lottery Ticket (1970) as Rajamma
9. C.I.D. Nazir (1971) as Lovely
10. Lanka Dahanam (1971)
11. Rathri Vandi (1971)
12. Marunaattil Oru Malayaali (1971) as Rajamma
13. Shiksha (1971) as Jayamala
14. Ernakulam Junction (1971) as Rathi
15. Thettu (1971) as Kukku
16. Vivaha Sammanam (1971)
17. Pushpaanjali (1972) as Salomi
18. Sambhavami Yuge Yuge (1972) as Meena
19. Kandavarundo (1972) as Biatriz
20. Manthrakodi (1972)
21. Maaya (1972).... Ambujam
22. Ananthasayanam (1972)
23. Naadan Premam (1972)
24. Taxi Car (1972) .... Reetha
25. Miss Mary (1972)
26. Nrithasaala (1972)
27. Aaradi Manninte Janmi (1972)
28. Theertha Yathra (1972)
29. Panimudakku (1972)
30. Punarjanmam (1972)
31. Panchavadi (1973) as Leela
32. Padmavyooham (1973) as Chinnamma
33. Ajnaathavasam (1973) as Bindu
34. Ladies Hostel (1973) as Reetha
35. Thaniniram (1973) as Menaka
36. Pachanottukal (1973)
37. Yaamini (1973) as Radha
38. Urvashi Bharathi (1973)
39. Nadeenadanmaare Aavasyamundu (1974)
40. Night Duty (1974)
41. Sethubandhanam (1974)
42. Poonthenaruvi (1974) as Susie
43. College Girl (1974) as Leela
44. Ayalathe Sundari (1974) as Margosa
45. Check Post (1974)
46. Bhoogolam Thiriyunnu (1974)
47. Swarnnavigraham (1974)
48. Pattabhishekam (1974) as Susie
49. Suprabhaatham (1974)
50. Panchathanthram (1974) as Julie/Vimala Gupta
51. Ulsavam (1975) as Kalyani
52. Boy Friend (1975)
53. Love Marriage (1975) as Kaanchi
54. Chandanachola (1975)
55. Kalyaanappanthal (1975)
56. Yakshagaanam (1976) as Panki
57. Rajaankanam (1976)
58. Raathriyile Yaathrakkaar (1976)
59. Kaadaaru Maasam (1976)
60. Pushpasharam (1976)
61. Nurayum Pathayum (1977)
62. Oonjal (1977) as Kochuparu
63. Lakshmi (1977)
64. Paavaadakkaari (1978)
65. Rowdy Ramu (1978)
66. Velluvili (1978) as Sarojini
67. Aalmaaraattam (1978)
68. Aval Vishwasthayayirunnu (1978) as Nurse
69. Kanalkattakal (1978) as Karumbi
70. Ithaanente Vazhi (1978)
71. Indradhanussu (1979)
72. Aval Niraparaadhi (1979)
73. Ente Sneham Ninakku Maathram (1979)
74. Vellayani Paramu (1979) as Janaki
75. Raajaveedhi (1979)
76. Maani Koya Kurup (1979)
77. Akalangalil Abhayam (1980)
78. Theenalangal (1980) as Mariyamma
79. Ithikkarappakki (1980)
80. Ariyappedaatha Rahasyam (1981) as Reetha
81. Velicham Vitharunna Penkutty /Punitha Malaar(1982) as Pankajam
82. Marupacha (1982) as Sadhana
83. Sandhya Vandanam (film) (1983) as Kalyani
84. Ithramathram (1986) as Stella
