= P. Madhuri =

Indian singer

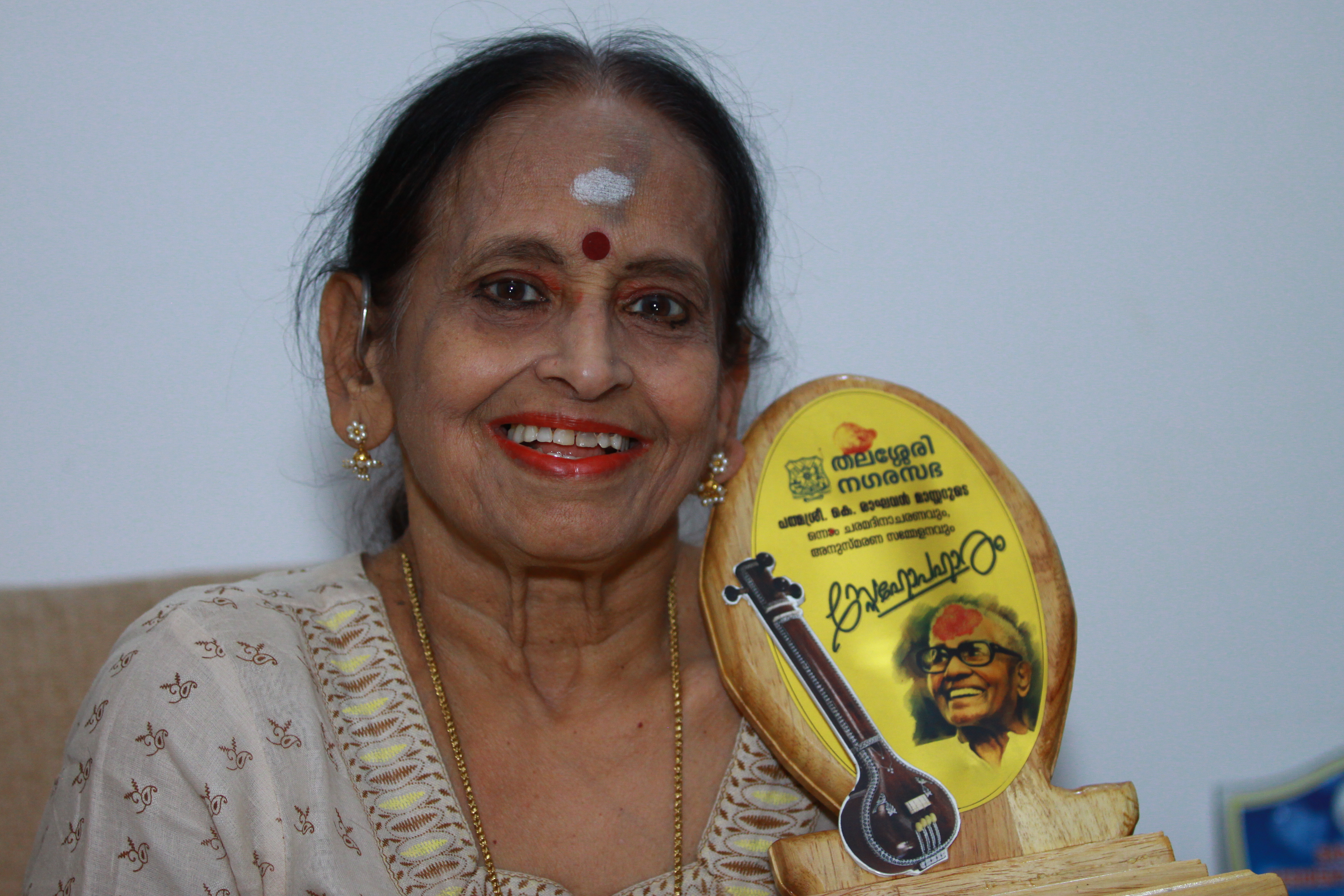
- Madhuri in 2014

Background information
- Born: Shivagnanam; 1941 (age 84–85); Trichinopoly, Tamil Nadu, India
- Occupation: Playback singer

Shivagnanam, known by the stage name P. Madhuri, is a South Indian playback singer. She has sung songs in Malayalam, Tamil, and Telugu. She has twice won Kerala State Film Award for best playback singer.

== Early life ==
Madhuri was born in Trichinopoly in a Tamil Brahmin family. Her birth name was Shivagnanam. She married V. Jayaram at the age of 13 and had given birth to two children by age 16. She was part of an amateur drama troupe when Malayalam music director G. Devarajan happened to watch one of her performances at Madras. She was introduced to films by Devarajan through Kadalppalam (1969), in which she sang the famous Mappila song "Kasthuri Thailamittu Mudi Minukki". Devarajan handpicked her and groomed her into one of the most successful Malayalam playback singers of all time.

== Career ==
She mainly sang in Malayalam films. She was probably the fourth most prominent female singer after S. Janaki, P. Susheela and P. Leela in Malayalam cinema in the 1970s and mainly sang songs composed by G. Devarajan Master. She has sung a total of 552 songs in Malayalam out of which the majority is under G. Devarajan. She has several folk songs, comedy songs, classical songs, devotional songs, romantic songs, sad songs under her credit, but what made her more popular was her ability to sing in high pitches. She had sung for all the music directors of that time, except MS Baburaj.
