= List of Malayalam songs recorded by S. Janaki =

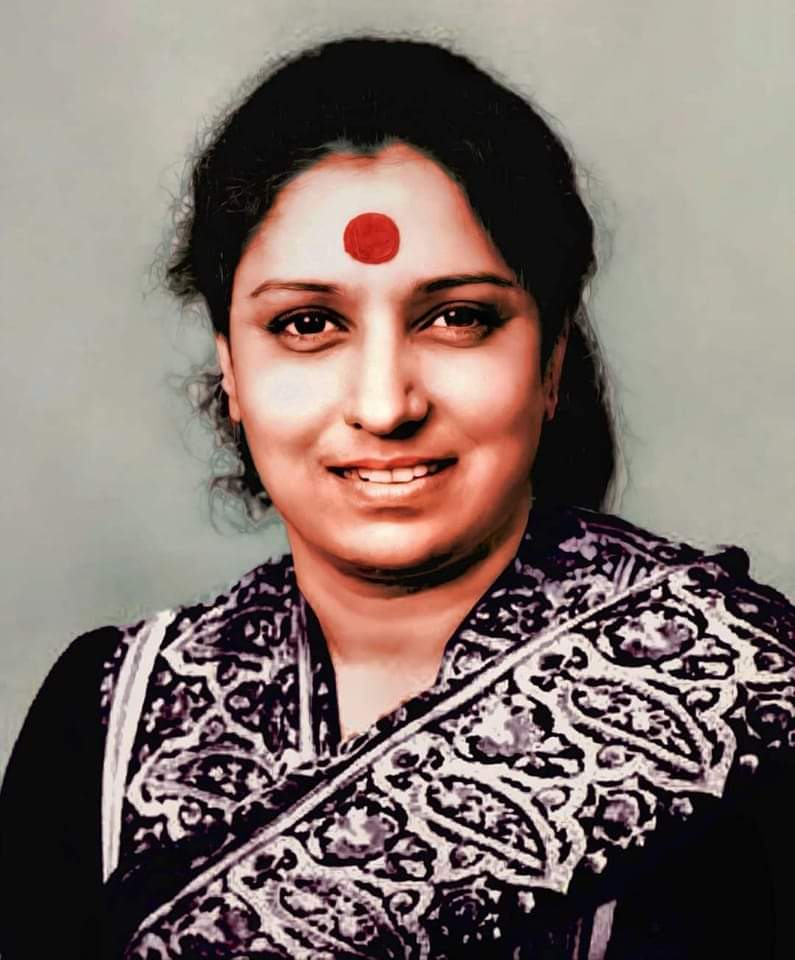
S. Janaki

S. Janaki (23 April 1938 – 11 July 2026) was an Indian singer who has sung over 48,000 songs in various Indian languages. She recorded her first Malayalam film song in 1957 for the film, Minnunnathellam Ponnalla. Following this, she went on to record thousands of songs until her last song, "Ammappoovinum" for the film, 10 Kalpanakal (2016).

Janaki, although recorded songs for all the leading Malayalam composers, her maximum songs were for music directors such as M. S. Baburaj, Shyam and A. T. Ummer. Her maximum duet songs were paired up with K. J. Yesudas followed by P. Jayachandran.

The following is a list of Malayalam film songs recorded by her:

== Before 1990s ==
=== 1950s ===
Year	Film	Song	Music director	Writer	Co-singer	Ref
1957	Minnunnathellam Ponnalla	"Irul Moodukayo"	S. N. Chaami	P. N. Dev	Solo	
1959	Minnalppadayaali	"Raakkuyile"	P. S. Divakar; S. N. Chaami	P. Bhaskaran	A. M. Rajah	
1959	Minnalppadayaali	"Valayitta Kochu Kaikale"	P. S. Divakar; S. N. Chaami	Abhayadev	Solo	
1959	Minnalppadayaali	"Poovaname Puthuvame"	P. S. Divakar; S. N. Chaami	Abhayadev	P. B. Sreenivas	

=== 1960s ===
Year	Film	Song	Music director	Writer	Co-singer	Ref
1960	Seetha	"Mangalam Neruka"	V. Dakshinamoorthy	Abhayadev	Solo	
1961	Unniyarcha	"Urangaathenthunni"	K. Raghavan	P. K. Sarangapani	P. Susheela	
1961	Unniyarcha	"Ponnoonjaale"	K. Raghavan	P. Bhaskaran	P. Susheela	
1961	Umminithanka	"Jai Jagadeesha"	V. Dakshinamoorthy	P. Bhaskaran	Solo	
1962	Snehadeepam	"Chandrante Prabhayil"	M. B. Sreenivasan	P. Bhaskaran	Kamukara Purushothaman	
1962	Snehadeepam	"Odum Paava Chaadum Paava"	M. B. Sreenivasan	P. Bhaskaran	Kamukara Purushothaman	
1962	Kalpadukal	"Thaakin Thaararo"	M. B. Sreenivasan	P. Bhaskaran	K. P. Udayabhanu, Anandavalli	
1962	Kalpadukal	"Oru Jaathi Oru Matham"	M. B. Sreenivasan	Sree Narayana Guru	K. P. Udayabhanu	
1962	Sreerama Pattabhishekam	"Mohini Njaan"	Br Lakshmanan	Thirunainar Kurichi Madhavan Nair	Solo	
1962	Kannum Karalum	"Valarnnu Valarnnu"	M. B. Sreenivasan	Vayalar Ramavarma	Solo	
1962	Swargarajyam	"Ellam Kazhinju Thelinja"	M. B. Sreenivasan	P. Bhaskaran	Solo	
1962	Bharya	"Kaanan Nalla Kinavukal"	G. Devarajan	Vayalar Ramavarma	Solo	
1963	Ninamaninja Kalpadukal	"Main To Gunghuru"	M. S. Baburaj	Meera bhajan	Solo	
1963	Snapaka Yohannan	"Pranayam"	Br Lakshmanan	Thirunainar Kurichi Madhavan Nair	Solo	
1963	Snapaka Yohannan	"Thaarakumaarikale"	Br Lakshmanan	Thirunainar Kurichi Madhavan Nair	Solo	
1963	Moodupadam	"Thaliritta Kinakkal"	M. S. Baburaj	P. Bhaskaran	Solo	
1963	Susheela	"Kandu Njaan Ninmukham"	V. Dakshinamoorthy	P. Bhaskaran	Solo	
1963	Kadalamma	"Ayirathiri"	G. Devarajan	Vayalar Ramavarma	Jikki	
1963	Kadalamma	"Mungi Mungi"	G. Devarajan	Vayalar Ramavarma	Jikki	
1963	Kadalamma	"Thiruvaathirayude Nattenno"	G. Devarajan	Vayalar Ramavarma	Solo	
1963	Ammaye Kaanaan	"Konnappoove"	K. Raghavan	P. Bhaskaran	Solo	
1963	Ammaye Kaanaan	"Unarunaroo Unnippoove"	K. Raghavan	P. Bhaskaran	Solo	
1963	Rebecca	"Kothikkalle Kothikkalle"	K. Raghavan	Vayalar Ramavarma	Solo	
1964	Thacholi Othenan	"Anjanakkanezhuthi"	M. S. Baburaj	P. Bhaskaran	Solo	
1964	Anna	"Aruvee"	G. Devarajan	Vayalar Ramavarma	K. J. Yesudas	
1964	Anna	"Manoraajyathinnathirilla"	G. Devarajan	Vayalar Ramavarma	P. Leela	
1964	Atom Bomb	"Azhakil Mikachathethu"	Br Lakshmanan	Thirunainar Kurichi Madhavan Nair	P. B. Sreenivas	
1964	Atom Bomb	"Love Venamo"	Br Lakshmanan	Thirunainar Kurichi Madhavan Nair	Solo	
1964	Atom Bomb	"Oh My Darling"	Br Lakshmanan	Thirunainar Kurichi Madhavan Nair	Kamukara Purushothaman	
1964	Karutha Kai	"Ezhu Nirangalil"	M. S. Baburaj	Thirunainar Kurichi Madhavan Nair	Kamukara Purushothaman ||	
1964	Karutha Kai	"Paalappoovin"	M. S. Baburaj	Thirunainar Kurichi Madhavan Nair	Solo	
1964	Pazhassi Raja	"Chirakaattuveenoru"	R. K. Shekhar	Vayalar Ramavarma	A. M. Rajah	
1964	Pazhassi Raja	"Panchavadiyil"	R. K. Shekhar	Vayalar Ramavarma	Solo	
1964	Bhargavi Nilayam	"Anuraaga Madhuchashakam"	M. S. Baburaj	P. Bhaskaran	Solo	
1964	Bhargavi Nilayam	"Pottatha Ponnin"	M. S. Baburaj	P. Bhaskaran	Solo	
1964	Bhargavi Nilayam	"Pottithakarnna Kinaavu"	M. S. Baburaj	P. Bhaskaran	Solo	
1964	Bhargavi Nilayam	"Vaasantha Panchami Naalil"	M. S. Baburaj	P. Bhaskaran	Solo	
1964	Althaara	"Kanyaamariyame Punyaprakaashame"	M. B. Sreenivasan	Thirunainar Kurichi Madhavan Nair	P. Susheela	
1964	Althaara	"Kannezhuthi Pottumthottu"	M. B. Sreenivasan	Thirunainar Kurichi Madhavan Nair	Solo	
1964	Althaara	"Paathiraappovonnu Kanthurannal"	M. B. Sreenivasan	Thirunainar Kurichi Madhavan Nair	L. R. Eeswari, Kamukara Purushothaman	
1964	Althaara	"Paathiraappovonnu Kanthurannal"	M. B. Sreenivasan	Thirunainar Kurichi Madhavan Nair	Kamukara Purushothaman	
1964	Althaara	"Varum Oru Naal"	M. B. Sreenivasan	Thirunainar Kurichi Madhavan Nair	Solo	
1965	Devatha	"Ormavaykkenam"	P. Divakar	P. Bhaskaran	M. Balamuralikrishna	
1965	Devatha	"Orunal Ennonanilaave"	P. Divakar	P. Bhaskaran	Solo	
1965	Shyamala Chechi	"Enthe Chandran"	K. Raghavan	P. Bhaskaran	Solo	
1965	Shyamala Chechi	"Kaanumbolingaane"	K. Raghavan	P. Bhaskaran	Solo	
1965	Odayil Ninnu	"Muttathe Mullayil"	G. Devarajan	Vayalar Ramavarma	Solo	
1965	Kadathukaran	"Kallachiriyanu"	M. S. Baburaj	Vayalar Ramavarma	Solo	
1965	Kadathukaran	"Manimukile"	M. S. Baburaj	Vayalar Ramavarma	A. K. Sukumaran	
1965	Porter Kunjali	"Paadaam Paadaam Thakarum"	M. S. Baburaj	Abhayadev	Solo	
1965	Kaliyodam	"Kaamuki Njaan"	G. Devarajan	O. N. V. Kurup	Solo	
1965	Kaliyodam	"Ormakal Than Ithaliloorum"	G. Devarajan	O. N. V. Kurup	K. J. Yesudas, Kamukara Purushothaman	
1965	Kaliyodam	"Kaliyodam"	G. Devarajan	O. N. V. Kurup	K. J. Yesudas, P. Leela	
1965	Muthalali	"Ethu Poovu Choodanam"	Pukazhenthi	P. Bhaskaran	Solo	
1965	Muthalali	"Kaniyaanum Vannilla"	Pukazhenthi	P. Bhaskaran		
1965	Muthalali	"Mullappoothailamittu"	Pukazhenthi	P. Bhaskaran	K. J. Yesudas	
1965	Muthalali	"Ponnaara Muthalali"	Pukazhenthi	P. Bhaskaran	B. Vasantha, Soolamangalam Rajalakshmi	
1965	Ammu	"Konchikkonchi"	M. S. Baburaj	Yusufali Kechery	K. P. Udayabhanu	
1965	Ammu	"Kunjippenninu"	M. S. Baburaj	Yusufali Kechery	L. R. Eeswari, M. S. Baburaj, Machad Vasanthi, Chandrashekharan Thambi	
1965	Ammu	"Thedunnathaare"	M. S. Baburaj	Yusufali Kechery	Solo	
1965	Thankakudam	"Madhurikkum Maathalappazhamaanu"	M. S. Baburaj	P. Bhaskaran	Solo	
1965	Kattuthulasi	"Sooryakaanthi Sooryakaanthi"	M. S. Baburaj	Vayalar Ramavarma	Solo	
1965	Mayavi	"Pavizhakkunnil"	M. S. Baburaj	P. Bhaskaran	Solo	
1965	Mayavi	"Valakilukkum Vaanampaadi"	M. S. Baburaj	P. Bhaskaran	K. P. Udayabhanu	
1965	Jeevithayaathra	"Pattiniyaal Pallaykkillil"	P. S. Divakar	P. Bhaskaran	Kamukara Purushothaman, Zero Babu	
1965	Rajamalli	"Jayakaali"	B. A. Chidambaranath	P. Bhaskaran	K. J. Yesudas	
1965	Rajamalli	"Karppoora Thenmaavil"	B. A. Chidambaranath	P. Bhaskaran	Solo	
1965	Rajamalli	"Kunninmele Neeyenikku"	B. A. Chidambaranath	P. Bhaskaran	Solo	
1965	Rajamalli	"Neelamukilukal"	B. A. Chidambaranath	P. Bhaskaran	Solo	
1965	Kochumon	"Maalakhamaare Marayalle"	Alleppey Usman	P. J. Eezhakkadavu	Solo	
1965	Bhoomiyile Malakha	"Aakaashathambalamuttathu"	P. S. Divakar	Thomas Parannoor	Bangalore Latha, Zero Babu	
1965	Bhoomiyile Malakha	"Maadappiravalle"	P. S. Divakar	K. M. Alavi	Solo	
1965	Bhoomiyile Malakha	"Mulmudichodiya Naadha"	P. S. Divakar	Varghese Vadakara	Solo	
1965	Shakuntala	"Manichilamboli"	G. Devarajan	Vayalar Ramavarma	Solo	
1965	Chettathi	"Ee Premapanchavadiyil"	M. S. Baburaj	Vayalar Ramavarma	Solo	
1965	Chettathi	"Kannanaamunni Urangu"	M. S. Baburaj	Vayalar Ramavarma	Solo	
1965	Chettathi	"Veedaayaal Vilakku"	M. S. Baburaj	Vayalar Ramavarma	P. B. Sreenivas	
1965	Murappennu	"Kadavathu Thoni"	B. A. Chidambaranath	P. Bhaskaran	Santha P. Nair	
1965	Murappennu	"Kalithozhimarenne Kaliyaakki"	B. A. Chidambaranath	P. Bhaskaran	K. J. Yesudas, Choir	
1965	Thommante Makkal	"Angane Angane"	M. S. Baburaj	Vayalar Ramavarma	K. J. Yesudas	
1965	Thommante Makkal	"Nillu Nillu"	M. S. Baburaj	Vayalar Ramavarma	P. Leela, P. B. Sreenivas, K. P. Udayabhanu	
1965	Thommante Makkal	"Njanurangaan Pokum"	M. S. Baburaj	Varghese Maliyekkal	Solo	
1965	Thommante Makkal	"Njanurangaan (bit)"	M. S. Baburaj	Varghese Maliyekkal	Solo	
1966	Manikyakottaram	"Kallante Peru"	M. S. Baburaj	Kaniyapuram Ramachandran	Solo	
1966	Kalithozhan	"Maalika Meloru"	G. Devarajan	P. Bhaskaran	A. M. Rajah	
1966	Kalithozhan	"Nandanavaniyil"	G. Devarajan	P. Bhaskaran	A. M. Rajah	
1966	Kalithozhan	"Pularee Pularee"	G. Devarajan	P. Bhaskaran	A. M. Rajah	
1966	Kalithozhan	"Urakkamille"	G. Devarajan	P. Bhaskaran	Solo	
1966	Puthri	"Kaanaan Kothichenne"	M. B. Sreenivasan	O. N. V. Kurup	Solo	
1966	Puthri	"Thaazhathe Cholayil"	M. B. Sreenivasan	O. N. V. Kurup	Solo	
1966	Puthri	"Vaarmukile Vaarmukile"	M. B. Sreenivasan	O. N. V. Kurup	Solo	
1966	Kusruthykuttan	"Ammaye Kalipikkan"	Vijaya Bhaskar	P. Bhaskaran	Solo	
1966	Kusruthykuttan	"Ammaye Kalipikkan (sad)"	Vijaya Bhaskar	P. Bhaskaran	B. Vasantha	
1966	Kusruthykuttan	"Ammaye Kalipikkan"	Vijaya Bhaskar	P. Bhaskaran	B. Vasantha	
1966	Kusruthykuttan	"Punnellu Koythallo"	Vijaya Bhaskar	P. Bhaskaran	P. B. Sreenivas	
1966	Kusruthykuttan	"Raareero Unni"	Vijaya Bhaskar	P. Bhaskaran	Solo	
1966	Station Master	"Jeevithanadakavedhi"	B. A. Chidambaranath	P. Bhaskaran	Solo	
1966	Station Master	"Oru Thulasi"	B. A. Chidambaranath	P. Bhaskaran	Solo	
1966	Station Master	"Pandorikkal"	B. A. Chidambaranath	P. Bhaskaran	Solo	
1966	Pakalkkinavu	"Guruvayoorilloru"	B. A. Chidambaranath	P. Bhaskaran	Solo	
1966	Pakalkkinavu	"Keshaadipaadam Thozhunnen"	B. A. Chidambaranath	P. Bhaskaran	Solo	
1966	Pakalkkinavu	"Nidrathan Neerazhi"	B. A. Chidambaranath	P. Bhaskaran	Solo	
1966	Rowdy	"Pakshisaastrakkaara"	G. Devarajan	Vayalar Ramavarma	Solo	
1966	Jail	"Killiyaattin Akkareyundoru"	G. Devarajan	Vayalar Ramavarma	Solo	
1966	Jail	"Thankavilakkathu"	G. Devarajan	Vayalar Ramavarma	Solo	
1966	Koottukar	"Kurumozhimulla"	M. S. Baburaj	Vayalar Ramavarma	K. J. Yesudas	
1966	Kaattumallika	"Thaamarathoniyil"	M. S. Baburaj	Sreekumaran Thampi	K. J. Yesudas	
1966	Kaattumallika	"Kalyaanamaakaatha"	M. S. Baburaj	Sreekumaran Thampi	P. Leela	
1966	Kaattumallika	"Kannuneerkaattile"	M. S. Baburaj	Sreekumaran Thampi	P. Leela	
1966	Kalyana Rathriyil	"Aadyathe Rathriyil"	G. Devarajan	Vayalar Ramavarma	Solo	
1966	Kalyana Rathriyil	"Alliyaambal Poovukale"	G. Devarajan	Vayalar Ramavarma	P. Jayachandran	
1966	Kalyana Rathriyil	"Maathalappoonkaavilinnale"	G. Devarajan	Vayalar Ramavarma	Solo	
1966	Kayamkulam Kochunni	"Kumkumappoovukal Poothu"	B. A. Chidambaranath	P. Bhaskaran	K. J. Yesudas	
1966	Kayamkulam Kochunni	"Viravaalan Kuruvi"	B. A. Chidambaranath	P. Bhaskaran	Solo	
1966	Tharavattamma	"Oru Kochu Swapnathin"	M. S. Baburaj	P. Bhaskaran	Solo	
1966	Tharavattamma	"Pandu Nammal"	M. S. Baburaj	P. Bhaskaran	B. Vasantha	
1966	Kanmanikal	"Aattin Manippurathe"	G. Devarajan	Vayalar Ramavarma	A. M. Rajah	
1966	Poochakkanni	"Pandoru Raajyathe"	M. S. Baburaj	Vayalar Ramavarma	Solo	
1966	Kallipennu	"Odakkuzhalochayumaay"	B. A. Chidambaranath	P. Bhaskaran	Solo	
1966	Kallipennu	"Pathinezham Vayassinte"	B. A. Chidambaranath	P. Bhaskaran	B. Vasantha	
1966	Kallipennu	"Thaarukal Chirikkunna"	B. A. Chidambaranath	P. Bhaskaran	K. J. Yesudas	
1966	Karuna	"Kalpatharuvin Thanalil"	G. Devarajan	O. N. V. Kurup	K. J. Yesudas	
1966	Karuna	"Poothu Poothu"	G. Devarajan	O. N. V. Kurup	Solo	
1966	Sthanarthi Saramma	"Akkarappachayile"	L. P. R. Varma	Vayalar Ramavarma	Solo	
1966	Priyathama	"Anuragathinnalakadal"	Br. Lakshmanan	Sreekumaran Thampi	P. Leela	
1966	Priyathama	"Karalil Vathilil"	Br. Lakshmanan	Sreekumaran Thampi	K. J. Yesudas	
1966	Mayor Nair	"Mudiniraaye Pookkalumaay"	L. P. R. Varma	Vayalar Ramavarma	P. Jayachandran	
1966	Mayor Nair	"Vaanampaadi Vanampaadi"	L. P. R. Varma	Vayalar Ramavarma	P. Jayachandran	
1966	Mayor Nair	"Varnna Pushpangal"	L. P. R. Varma	Vayalar Ramavarma	P. Jayachandran	
1967	Sahadharmini	"Aalolam"	B. A. Chidambaranath	Vayalar Ramavarma	P. Leela	
1967	Sahadharmini	"Chaanchakkam"	B. A. Chidambaranath	Vayalar Ramavarma	Solo	
1967	Jeevikkan Anuvadikku	"Njaanivide Elpikkunnu"	Vijaya Bhaskar	P. Bhaskaran	P. B. Sreenivas	
1967	Iruttinte Athmavu	"Eeranuduthukondambaram"	M. S. Baburaj	P. Bhaskaran	Solo	
1967	Iruttinte Athmavu	"Ambadikkannanu Maampazham"	M. S. Baburaj	P. Bhaskaran	Solo	
1967	Iruttinte Athmavu	"Irukaneerthullikal"	M. S. Baburaj	P. Bhaskaran	Solo	
1967	Iruttinte Athmavu	"Vaakachaarthu Kazhinjoru"	M. S. Baburaj	P. Bhaskaran	Solo	
1967	Sheelavathi	"Kaarthika Manideepa"	G. Devarajan	P. Bhaskaran	P. Jayachandran	
1967	Sheelavathi	"Muttatthu Prathyoosha"	G. Devarajan	P. Bhaskaran	Solo	
1967	Sheelavathi	"Surabheemaasam"	G. Devarajan	P. Bhaskaran	Solo	
1967	Sheelavathi	"Uthareeyam"	G. Devarajan	P. Bhaskaran	Solo	
1967	Udhyogastha	"Ezhuthiyathaaranu"	M. S. Baburaj	Yusufali Kechery	K. J. Yesudas	
1967	Udhyogastha	"Maankidaavine"	M. S. Baburaj	Yusufali Kechery	Solo	
1967	Udhyogastha	"Sharanam Nin Charanam"	M. S. Baburaj	Yusufali Kechery	Solo	
1967	Udhyogastha	"Thankam Vegam"	M. S. Baburaj	Yusufali Kechery	Solo	
1967	Arakkillam	"Ormakal"	G. Devarajan	Vayalar Ramavarma	P. B. Sreenivas	
1967	Balyakalasakhi	"Nin Rakthamente"	M. S. Baburaj	P. Bhaskaran	P. B. Sreenivas	
1967	Balyakalasakhi	"Oru Koottam Njaaninnu"	M. S. Baburaj	P. Bhaskaran	Solo	
1967	Lady Doctor	"Kanninayum Kanninayum"	V. Dakshinamoorthy	P. Bhaskaran	Kamukara Purushothaman	
1967	Lady Doctor	"Vidilla Njaan"	V. Dakshinamoorthy	P. Bhaskaran	Kamukara Purushothaman	
1967	Karutha Rathrikal	"Kilimakale"	M. S. Baburaj	O. N. V. Kurup	Solo	
1967	Karutha Rathrikal	"Omanathinkale (happy)"	M. S. Baburaj	O. N. V. Kurup	Solo	
1967	Karutha Rathrikal	"Omanathinkale (sad)"	M. S. Baburaj	O. N. V. Kurup	Solo	
1967	Aval	"Aariyankaaviloraattidayan"	G. Devarajan	Vayalar Ramavarma	Solo	
1967	Aval	"Innallo Kaamadevanu"	G. Devarajan	Vayalar Ramavarma	P. Susheela	
1967	Bhagyamudra	"Madhurapratheekshathan"	Pukazhenthi	P. Bhaskaran	K. J. Yesudas	
1967	Bhagyamudra	"Ethu Koottil Nee"	Pukazhenthi	P. Bhaskaran	Solo	
1967	Khadeeja	"Karalil Virinja"	M. S. Baburaj	Yusufali Kechery	Solo	
1967	Khadeeja	"Ananthashayanaa"	M. S. Baburaj	Yusufali Kechery	B. Vasantha	
1967	Anweshichu Kandethiyilla	"Kavilathe Kanneer Kandu"	M. S. Baburaj	P. Bhaskaran	Solo	
1967	Anweshichu Kandethiyilla	"Murivaalan Kurangachhan"	M. S. Baburaj	P. Bhaskaran	Solo	
1967	Anweshichu Kandethiyilla	"Thaamarakkumbilallo"	M. S. Baburaj	P. Bhaskaran	Solo	
1967	Anweshichu Kandethiyilla	"Pavananaam Aattidaya"	M. S. Baburaj	P. Bhaskaran	B. Vasantha	
1967	Chithramela	"Madam Pottichirikkunna"	G. Devarajan	Sreekumaran Thampi	K. J. Yesudas	
1967	Kunjali Marakkar	"Neeyillathaarundabhayam"	B. A. Chidambaranath	P. Bhaskaran	Solo	
1967	Kunjali Marakkar	"Ololam Kaavilulla"	B. A. Chidambaranath	P. Bhaskaran	Solo	
1967	Thalirukal	"Pandu Pandoru Kaattil"	A. T. Ummer	Dr. Pavithran	K. J. Yesudas	
1967	Thalirukal	"Poovaadithorum"	A. T. Ummer	Dr. Pavithran	Solo	
1967	Kudumbam	"Balyakalaasakhi"	R. Sudarsanam	Vayalar Ramavarma	K. J. Yesudas	
1967	Kudumbam	"Chithrapournami Rathriyil"	R. Sudarsanam	Vayalar Ramavarma	K. J. Yesudas	
1967	Kudumbam	"Unarookanna Nee"	R. Sudarsanam	Vayalar Ramavarma	Solo	
1967	Pareeksha	"Avidunnen Gaanam Kelkkan"	M. S. Baburaj	P. Bhaskaran	Solo	
1967	Pareeksha	"En Praananayakane"	M. S. Baburaj	P. Bhaskaran	Solo	
1967	Pareeksha	"Chelil Thaamara"	M. S. Baburaj	P. Bhaskaran	Solo	
1967	Cochin Express	"Irathedi Piriyum"	V. Dakshinamoorthy	Sreekumaran Thampi	Uthaman	
1967	Cochin Express	"Kadhayonnu Kettu"	V. Dakshinamoorthy	Sreekumaran Thampi	Solo	
1967	Pooja	"Maanasa Saarasamalar"	G. Devarajan	P. Bhaskaran	Solo	
1967	Pooja	"Swargeeya Sundaranimisham"	G. Devarajan	P. Bhaskaran	Solo	
1967	Pooja	"Vidoorayaya Thaarake"	G. Devarajan	P. Bhaskaran	Solo	
1967	N.G.O	"Kaanan Azhakulloru"	B. A. Chidambaranath	P. Bhaskaran	K. J. Yesudas	
1967	Kavalam Chundan	"Cheekiminukkiya"	G. Devarajan	Vayalar Ramavarma	Solo	
1967	Naadan Pennu	"Eeyide Penninoru"	G. Devarajan	Vayalar Ramavarma	Solo	
1967	Chekuthante Kotta	"Kaanana Sadanathin"	B. A. Chidambaranath	P. Bhaskaran	Solo	
1967	Paathirapattu	"Nizhalaay Ninte Pirake"	Vijaya Bhaskar	P. Bhaskaran	Solo	
1967	Mulkireedam	"Kanakaswapna"	Prathap Singh	Sreekumaran Thampi	Solo	
1967	Mulkireedam	"Kulikazhinju"	Prathap Singh	Sreekumaran Thampi	Solo	
1968	Viplavakarikal	"Thookkanamkuruvi"	G. Devarajan	Vayalar Ramavarma	K. J. Yesudas	
1968	Thirichadi	"Kalppakappoonchola"	R. Sudarsanam	Vayalar Ramavarma	K. J. Yesudas	
1968	Karutha Pournami	"Kavithayil Mungi"	M. K. Arjunan	P. Bhaskaran	Solo	
1968	Karutha Pournami	"Maanathin Muttatthu"	M. K. Arjunan	P. Bhaskaran	Solo	
1968	Karutha Pournami	"Shishuvineppol Punchirithooki"	M. K. Arjunan	P. Bhaskaran	K. J. Yesudas	
1968	Manaswini	"Aaraadhikayude Poojakusumam"	M. S. Baburaj	P. Bhaskaran	Solo	
1968	Manaswini	"Muttivilikkunnu Vaathilil"	M. S. Baburaj	P. Bhaskaran	Solo	
1968	Manaswini	"Paathiravaayilla"	M. S. Baburaj	P. Bhaskaran	K. J. Yesudas	
1968	Inspector	"Kanavil Njaan Theertha"	M. S. Baburaj	P. Bhaskaran	Solo	
1968	Asuravithu	"Kattakattakkarayittu"	K. Raghavan	P. Bhaskaran	Solo	
1968	Karthika	"Kanmaniye Karayaathurangoo"	M. S. Baburaj	Yusufali Kechery	Solo	
1968	Karthika	"Kanmaniye (sad)"	M. S. Baburaj	Yusufali Kechery	Solo	
1968	Karthika	"Madhumaasaraathri"	M. S. Baburaj	Yusufali Kechery	Solo	
1968	Padunna Puzha	"Paadunnu Puzha"	V. Dakshinamoorthy	Sreekumaran Thampi	P. Leela	
1968	Padunna Puzha	"Paadunnu Puzha (bit)"	V. Dakshinamoorthy	Sreekumaran Thampi	Solo	
1968	Yakshi	"Chandrodayathile"	G. Devarajan	Vayalar Ramavarma	K. J. Yesudas	
1968	Yakshi	"Chandrodayathile (solo)"	G. Devarajan	Vayalar Ramavarma	Solo	
1968	Lakshaprabhu	"Swarnavalakalitta"	M. S. Baburaj	P. Bhaskaran	Solo	
1968	Lakshaprabhu	"Vennilaavinenthariyaam"	M. S. Baburaj	P. Bhaskaran	Solo	
1968	Kaliyalla Kalyanam	"Kannil Swapnathil"	A. T. Ummer	P. Bhaskaran	L. R. Eeswari	
1968	Kaliyalla Kalyanam	"Thaarunya Swapnangal"	A. T. Ummer	P. Bhaskaran	P. Jayachandran, Latha Raju	
1968	Love in Kerala	"Athithi"	M. S. Baburaj	Sreekumaran Thampi	Solo	
1968	Kadal	"Chirikkumbol Koode"	M. B. Sreenivasan	Sreekumaran Thampi	Solo	
1968	Thulabharam	"Prabhaatha Gopura"	G. Devarajan	Vayalar Ramavarma	K. J. Yesudas	
1968	Ragini	"Aavani Mulla"	Allepey Usman	Latha Vaikkam	Solo	
1968	Ragini	"Anantha Kodi"	Allepey Usman	Latha Vaikkam	Solo	
1968	Ragini	"Nimisham Thorum"	Allepey Usman	Latha Vaikkam	Solo	
1968	Ragini	"Kadalippoovin"	Allepey Usman	Latha Vaikkam	K. J. Yesudas	
1968	Midumidukki	"Akale Akale Neelakasham"	M. S. Baburaj	Sreekumaran Thampi	K. J. Yesudas	
1968	Anchu Sundarikal	"Pathinezhilethiya"	M. S. Baburaj	Yusufali Kechery	Solo	
1968	Pengal	"Raararo Raariraaro"	K. V. Job; George	T. P. Sukumaran; Santhakumar	Solo	
1968	Aparadhini	"Raajahamsame"	M. B. Sreenivasan	P. Bhaskaran	Solo	
1968	Aparadhini	"Kottidayadachoren"	M. B. Sreenivasan	P. Bhaskaran	K. J. Yesudas	
1968	Kodungallooramma	"Bhadradeepam"	K. Raghavan	Vayalar Ramavarma	Solo	
1968	Kayalkkarayil	"Devan Thannathu"	Vijaya Bhaskar	P. Bhaskaran	K. J. Yesudas	
1968	Bharyamar Sookshikkuka	"Vaikkathashtami Naalil"	V. Dakshinamoorthy	Sreekumaran Thampi	K. J. Yesudas	
1969	Aalmaram	"Paraaga Surabhila"	A. T. Ummer	P. Bhaskaran	Solo	
1969	Aalmaram	"Pinneyum Inakkuyil"	A. T. Ummer	P. Bhaskaran	P. Jayachandran	
1969	Janmabhoomi	"Malaranimandaarame"	B. A. Chidambaranath	P. Bhaskaran	M. Balamuralikrishna	
1969	Janmabhoomi	"Manathe Mannaathikkoru"	B. A. Chidambaranath	P. Bhaskaran	Solo	
1969	Ballatha Pahayan	"Mottaayum Poovayum"	K. V. Job	Sreekumaran Thampi	Solo	
1969	Rahasyam	"Ayiram Kunnukalkkappurath"	B. A. Chidambaranath	Sreekumaran Thampi	Solo	
1969	Kannur Deluxe	"Varumallo Raavil"	V. Dakshinamoorthy	Sreekumaran Thampi	Solo	
1969	Kannur Deluxe	"Ee Mohabbathinenthoru"	V. Dakshinamoorthy	Sreekumaran Thampi	P. B. Sreenivas, K. J. Yesudas	
1969	Nurse	"Harinaamakeerthanam"	M. B. Sreenivasan	Sreekumaran Thampi	K. J. Yesudas	
1969	Sandhya	"Aadumutthe"	M. S. Baburaj	Vayalar Ramavarma	Solo	
1969	Sandhya	"Asthamaanakkadalinakale"	M. S. Baburaj	Vayalar Ramavarma	K. J. Yesudas	
1969	Sandhya	"Daaham Daaham"	M. S. Baburaj	Vayalar Ramavarma	Solo	
1969	Vilakuranja Manushyan	"Ente Kannil"	Pukazhenthi	P. Bhaskaran	Solo	
1969	Vilakuranja Manushyan	"Madhyaahna Sundara"	Pukazhenthi	P. Bhaskaran	Solo	
1969	Kuruthykkalam	"Virunnorukke"	Jaya-Vijaya	P. Bhaskaran	Solo	
1969	Poojapushpam	"Kodi Jenmameduthaalum"	V. Dakshinamoorthy	Thikkurissy Sukumaran Nair	K. J. Yesudas	
1969	Poojapushpam	"Mohamo Daahamo"	V. Dakshinamoorthy	Thikkurissy Sukumaran Nair	Solo	
1969	Vilakkapetta Bendhangal	"Paadano Njaan Paadano"	A. T. Ummer	Dr. Pavithran	Solo	
1969	Vilakkapetta Bendhangal	"Paadume Njaan Paadume"	A. T. Ummer	Dr. Pavithran	Solo	
1969	Vilakkapetta Bendhangal	"Swarnamukilukal Swapnam"	A. T. Ummer	Dr. Pavithran	Solo	
1969	Chattambikkavala	"Anjanakkulir Neela"	B. A. Chidambaranath	O. N. V. Kurup	K. J. Yesudas	
1969	Chattambikkavala	"Anthimalarkkili Koodananju"	B. A. Chidambaranath	O. N. V. Kurup	K. J. Yesudas	
1969	Chattambikkavala	"Mayilppeeli Mizhikalil"	B. A. Chidambaranath	O. N. V. Kurup	K. J. Yesudas	
1969	Velliyazhcha	"Kettippidichappol"	M. S. Baburaj	P. Bhaskaran	Solo	
1969	Velliyazhcha	"Paarvana Rajani"	M. S. Baburaj	P. Bhaskaran	Raveendran	
1969	Danger Biscuit	"Kaamukan Vannal"	V. Dakshinamoorthy	Sreekumaran Thampi	Solo	
1969	Danger Biscuit	"Kannil Kannil"	V. Dakshinamoorthy	Sreekumaran Thampi	Solo	
1969	Danger Biscuit	"Parayaan Enikku Naanam"	V. Dakshinamoorthy	Sreekumaran Thampi	Solo	
1969	Virunnukari	"Innale Njaanoru"	M. S. Baburaj	P. Bhaskaran	C. O. Anto	
1969	Virunnukari	"Muttathemullathan"	M. S. Baburaj	P. Bhaskaran	Solo	
1969	Rest House	"Vasanthame Vaariyeriyoo"	M. K. Arjunan	Sreekumaran Thampi	Solo	
1969	Rest House	"Yamune Yadukula Rathidevanevide"	M. K. Arjunan	Sreekumaran Thampi	P. Jayachandran	

=== 1970s ===
Year	Film	Song	Music director	Writer	Co-singer	Ref
1970	Saraswathi	"Aaru Paranju"	M. S. Baburaj	Thikkurissy Sukumaran Nair	Solo	
1970	Saraswathi	"Marathakamanivarnna"	M. S. Baburaj	Thikkurissy Sukumaran Nair	Solo	
1970	Anadha	"Etho Sundara"	M. S. Baburaj	P. Bhaskaran	Solo	
1970	Anadha	"Hemantha Nidrayil"	M. S. Baburaj	P. Bhaskaran	Solo	
1970	Olavum Theeravum	"Chaampakkam Cholayil"	M. S. Baburaj	P. Bhaskaran	Solo	
1970	Olavum Theeravum	"Idakkonnu Chirichu"	M. S. Baburaj	P. Bhaskaran	Solo	
1970	Kurukshethram	"Kaalam Mudikkettil"	K. Raghavan	P. Bhaskaran	Solo	
1970	Kurukshethram	"Karmukil Pennu"	K. Raghavan	P. Bhaskaran	Solo	
1970	Kurukshethram	"Thiruvegappurayulla"	K. Raghavan	P. Bhaskaran	Solo	
1970	Nishagandhi	"Maniveena"	G. Devarajan	O. N. V. Kurup	Solo	
1970	Nishagandhi	"Neelavaaname"	G. Devarajan	O. N. V. Kurup	Solo	
1970	Nishagandhi	"Poovaalankkili Poovaalankkili"	G. Devarajan	O. N. V. Kurup	Solo	
1970	Nishagandhi	"Neelavaaname (sad)"	G. Devarajan	O. N. V. Kurup	Solo	
1970	Kalpana	"Kunnathe Poomaram"	V. Dakshinamoorthy	Vayalar Ramavarma	Solo	
1970	Kalpana	"Vajrakireedam"	V. Dakshinamoorthy	Vayalar Ramavarma	Solo	
1970	Kalpana	"Amrithavarshini"	V. Dakshinamoorthy	Vayalar Ramavarma	L. R. Eeswari	
1970	Sthree	"Ambala Veliyil"	V. Dakshinamoorthy	P. Bhaskaran	Solo	
1970	Sthree	"Kavitha Paadiya"	V. Dakshinamoorthy	P. Bhaskaran	Solo	
1970	Sthree	"Innale Neeyoru"	V. Dakshinamoorthy	P. Bhaskaran	K. J. Yesudas	
1970	Bheekara Nimishangal	"Vaishaka Poojaykku"	M. S. Baburaj	Vayalar Ramavarma	K. J. Yesudas	
1970	Rakthapushpam	"Kaashithettippoovinoru"	M. K. Arjunan	Sreekumaran Thampi	Solo	
1970	Rakthapushpam	"Malarambanarinjilla"	M. K. Arjunan	Sreekumaran Thampi	P. Jayachandran	
1970	Thurakkatha Vathil	"Kadakannin Muna Kondu"	K. Raghavan	P. Bhaskaran	Renuka	
1970	Thurakkatha Vathil	"Manassinnullil"	K. Raghavan	P. Bhaskaran	Solo	
1970	Abhayam	"Neeradalathaagriham"	V. Dakshinamoorthy	G. Sankara Kurup	Solo	
1970	Kakkathamburatti	"Panchavarnnappainkilikal"	K. Raghavan	Sreekumaran Thampi	K. J. Yesudas	
1970	Kakkathamburatti	"Uthrattathiyil"	K. Raghavan	P. Bhaskaran	Solo	
1970	Madhuvidhu	"Aathirakkulirulla"	M. B. Sreenivasan	O. N. V. Kurup	Solo	
1970	Madhuvidhu	"Yamunaatheeravihari"	M. B. Sreenivasan	O. N. V. Kurup	Solo	
1971	Moonnupookkal	"Onnaanaam Poomarathil"	Pukazhenthi	P. Bhaskaran	Solo	
1971	Moonnupookkal	"Thiriyo Thiri"	Pukazhenthi	P. Bhaskaran	Solo	
1971	Moonnupookkal	"Sakhee Kunkumamo"	Pukazhenthi	P. Bhaskaran	K. J. Yesudas	
1971	C.I.D. In Jungle	"Thennale Thennale"	Bhagyanath	Kedamangalam Sadanandan	K. J. Yesudas	
1971	Kuttyedathi	"Prapancha Chethana"	M. S. Baburaj	Sreekumaran Thampi	Solo	
1971	Jalakanyaka	"Aaro Aaro"	A. T. Ummer	Dr. Pavithran	Solo	
1971	Jalakanyaka	"Aadyaraavil Athiraraavil"	A. T. Ummer	Dr. Pavithran	K. J. Yesudas	
1971	C.I.D. Nazir	"Pranayasarovarame"	M. K. Arjunan	Sreekumaran Thampi	Solo	
1971	Vithukal	"Gopuramukalil"	Pukazhenthi	P. Bhaskaran	Solo	
1971	Lora Neeyevide	"Karpoora Nakshatradeepam"	M. S. Baburaj	Vayalar Ramavarma	Solo	
1971	Anadha Shilpangal	"Achankkovilaattile"	R. K. Shekhar	Sreekumaran Thampi	P. Jayachandran	
1971	Anadha Shilpangal	"Paathividarnnoru"	R. K. Shekhar	Sreekumaran Thampi	Solo	
1971	Muthassi	"Premakaumudi"	V. Dakshinamoorthy	P. Bhaskaran	K. J. Yesudas	
1971	Muthassi	"Pambayaarin Panineer"	V. Dakshinamoorthy	P. Bhaskaran	Solo	
1971	Rathrivandi	"Vaarmazhavillinte"	M. S. Baburaj	P. Bhaskaran	Solo	
1971	Rathrivandi	"Poovukal Chirichu"	M. S. Baburaj	P. Bhaskaran	K. J. Yesudas	
1971	Aana Valarthiya Vanampadiyude Makan	"Engengo Ullasayaathra"	K. V. Mahadevan	O. N. V. Kurup		
1971	Aana Valarthiya Vanampadiyude Makan	"Kankonil Kanavinte"	K. V. Mahadevan	O. N. V. Kurup	K. J. Yesudas	
1971	Aana Valarthiya Vanampadiyude Makan	"Virunninu Vili Kelkkanda"	K. V. Mahadevan	O. N. V. Kurup	L. R. Eeswari	
1971	Achante Bharya	"Aariraaro Thamarappoomizhi"	V. Dakshinamoorthy	Thikkurissy Sukumaran Nair	Solo	
1971	Achante Bharya	"Vahinee Premavahinee"	V. Dakshinamoorthy	Thikkurissy Sukumaran Nair	K. J. Yesudas	
1971	Achante Bharya	"Varumo Nee Varumo"	V. Dakshinamoorthy	Thikkurissy Sukumaran Nair	K. J. Yesudas	
1971	Aabhijathyam	"Mazhamukiloli Varnnan"	A. T. Ummer	P. Bhaskaran	Solo	
1971	Vimochanasamaram	"Amritha Kiranam"	M. B. Sreenivasan	P. Bhaskaran	K. J. Yesudas	
1971	Vimochanasamaram	"Kaattilirunnu Virunnu"	M. B. Sreenivasan	Vayalar Ramavarma	Solo	
1971	Vimochanasamaram	"Neelanilaavin Paalkkadalil"	M. B. Sreenivasan	P. N. Dev	Rangarajan	
1971	Vimochanasamaram	"Prapancha Hridaya"	M. B. Sreenivasan	Mankombu Gopalakrishnan	P. Leela	
1971	Marunnattil Oru Malayali	"Govardhana Giri"	V. Dakshinamoorthy	Sreekumaran Thampi	Solo	
1971	Marunnattil Oru Malayali	"Manassilunaroo"	V. Dakshinamoorthy	Sreekumaran Thampi	K. J. Yesudas	
1971	Puthenveedu	"Kayyil Malleeshara"	M. S. Baburaj	Vayalar Ramavarma		
1971	Puthenveedu	"Kaattil Chuzhalikkaattil"	M. S. Baburaj	Vayalar Ramavarma	Kamukara Purushothaman	
1971	Sumangali	"Neelakkarimbinte"	R. K. Shekhar	Sreekumaran Thampi	P. Jayachandran	
1971	Sumangali	"Nishaageethamaay Ozhuki"	R. K. Shekhar	Sreekumaran Thampi	Solo	
1971	Ummachu	"Veenakkambi Thakarnnal"	K. Raghavan	P. Bhaskaran	Solo	
1971	Ernakulam Junction	"Vanarodhanam Kettuvo"	M. S. Baburaj	P. Bhaskaran	Solo	
1971	Yogamullaval	"Neelasaagara Theeram"	R. K. Shekhar	Sreekumaran Thampi	S. P. Balasubrahmanyam	
1971	Yogamullaval	"Padarnnu Padarnnu"	R. K. Shekhar	Sreekumaran Thampi	S. P. Balasubrahmanyam	
1971	Vilakku Vangiya Veena	"Iniyurangoo"	V. Dakshinamoorthy	P. Bhaskaran	Solo	
1971	Vilakku Vangiya Veena	"Iniyurangoo (sad)"	V. Dakshinamoorthy	P. Bhaskaran	Solo	
1971	Kochaniyathi	"Sundararaavil"	Pukazhenthi	Sreekumaran Thampi	Solo	
1971	Kochaniyathi	"Thinkaleppole Chirikkunna"	Pukazhenthi	Sreekumaran Thampi	Solo	
1972	Prathikaram	"Swapnam Kaanukayo"	M. B. Sreenivasan	Sreekumaran Thampi	Solo	
1972	Prathikaram	"Suve Wazire Waaliyaan"	M. B. Sreenivasan	Sreekumaran Thampi	P. B. Sreenivas	
1972	Aaradimanninte Janmi	"Innale Raaviloru"	R. K. Shekhar	P. Bhaskaran	Solo	
1972	Aaradimanninte Janmi	"Pathinanchithalulla Pournamipoovinte"	R. K. Shekhar	Sreekumaran Thampi	Solo	
1972	Panimudakku	"Maanasasarassin"	M. S. Baburaj	Vayalar Ramavarma	Solo	
1972	Panimudakku	"Vijayadashami Vidarumee"	M. S. Baburaj	Vayalar Ramavarma	Susheeladevi	
1972	Kandavarundo	"Udukkukottipaadum"	R. K. Shekhar	Sreekumaran Thampi	Solo	
1972	Kandavarundo	"Varnnashaalayil Varoo"	R. K. Shekhar	Sreekumaran Thampi	Solo	
1972	Maaya	"Ammathan Kanninamritha"	V. Dakshinamoorthy	Sreekumaran Thampi	Solo	
1972	Maaya	"Valampiri Shankil"	V. Dakshinamoorthy	Sreekumaran Thampi	Solo	
1972	Baalyaprathijna	"Bharathavamsa"	K. K. Anthony	P. Bhaskaran	Solo	
1972	Baalyaprathijna	"Jeevitham Oru Van Nadi"	K. K. Anthony	P. Bhaskaran	Solo	
1972	Baalyaprathijna	"Malaroli Thiralunnu"	K. K. Anthony	P. Bhaskaran	K. J. Yesudas	
1972	Baalyaprathijna	"Suravana Ramanikal"	K. K. Anthony	P. Bhaskaran	K. J. Yesudas	
1972	Preethi	"Kanna Kaarvarnna"	A. T. Ummer	Pavithran	Solo	
1972	Preethi	"Umma Tharumo"	A. T. Ummer	Pavithran	K. C. Varghese Kunnamkulam, Latha Raju	
1972	Pulliman	"Aayiram Varnangal"	M. S. Baburaj	Sreekumaran Thampi	Solo	
1972	Pulliman	"Vaidoorya Rathnamaalacharthi"	M. S. Baburaj	Sreekumaran Thampi	Solo	
1972	Vidhyarthikale Ithile Ithile	"Nalanda Thakshashila"	M. B. Sreenivasan	Vayalar Ramavarma	Solo	
1972	Vidhyarthikale Ithile Ithile	"Velichame Nayichaalum"	M. B. Sreenivasan	Vayalar Ramavarma	Solo	
1972	Kalippava	"Neela Neela Vanamatha"	B. A. Chidambaranath	Sugathakumari	M. Balamuralikrishna	
1972	Kalippava	"Olam Kunjolam"	B. A. Chidambaranath	Sugathakumari	Solo	
1972	Kalippava	"Thaamarappoove"	B. A. Chidambaranath	Sugathakumari	Solo	
1972	Iniyoru Janmam Tharu	"Arali Thulasi"	M. B. Sreenivasan	Vayalar Ramavarma	Solo	
1972	Iniyoru Janmam Tharu	"Shabdhasaagara Nandinimaare"	M. B. Sreenivasan	Vayalar Ramavarma	K. J. Yesudas, Jaya Vijaya	
1972	Miss Mary	"Sangeethame"	R. K. Shekhar	Sreekumaran Thampi	Ambili	
1972	Thottilla	"Aakashathottilil"	R. K. Shekhar	Sreekumaran Thampi	K. J. Yesudas	
1972	Nrithasala	"Manjaninja Madhumaasa"	V. Dakshinamoorthy	P. Bhaskaran	Solo	
1972	Sree Guruvayoorappan	"Chitrashalabhangalaam Chithirapponnin"	V. Dakshinamoorthy	O. N. V. Kurup	Solo	
1972	Sree Guruvayoorappan	"Oru Varam Thedi"	V. Dakshinamoorthy	O. N. V. Kurup	Solo	
1972	Sree Guruvayoorappan	"Thirumizhimunayaal"	V. Dakshinamoorthy	O. N. V. Kurup	Solo	
1972	Azhimukham	"Karukarambathu"	M. S. Baburaj	Poochakkal Shahul Hameed	Solo	
1972	Azhimukham	"Orila Eerila"	M. S. Baburaj	Mankombu Gopalakrishnan	Solo	
1972	Anweshanam	"Maanathu Ninnoru"	M. K. Arjunan	Sreekumaran Thampi	K. J. Yesudas	
1972	Anweshanam	"Thulaavarsha Meghangal"	M. K. Arjunan	Sreekumaran Thampi		
1972	Snehadeepame Mizhi Thurakku	"Lokam Muzhuvan"	Pukazhenthi	P. Bhaskaran	Solo	
1972	Snehadeepame Mizhi Thurakku	"Lokam Muzhuvan"	Pukazhenthi	P. Bhaskaran	K. P. Brahmanandan, Raveendran, B. Vasantha	
1972	Snehadeepame Mizhi Thurakku	"Naadakam Theernu"	Pukazhenthi	P. Bhaskaran		
1972	Ananthasayanam	"Sandhyaa Megham"	K. Raghavan	Sreekumaran Thampi	Solo	
1972	Ananthasayanam	"Udayachandrike"	K. Raghavan	Sreekumaran Thampi	Solo	
1972	Puthrakameshti	"Maasam Madhumaasam"	V. Dakshinamoorthy	Vayalar Ramavarma	Solo	
1972	Sakthi	"Kuliro Kuliro"	V. Dakshinamoorthy	Vayalar Ramavarma	Solo	
1972	Mappusakshi	"Vrischika Karthika Poo"	M. S. Baburaj	Sreekumaran Thampi	Solo	
1973	Periyar	"Anthivilakku"	K. V. Job; P. K. Sivadas	P. J. Antony	Freddy	
1973	Periyar	"Marakkaanum Piriyaanum"	K. V. Job; P. K. Sivadas	P. J. Antony	Freddy	
1973	Ragging	"Aakaashagangayil Njaanorikkal"	M. K. Arjunan	P. J. Antony	Solo	
1973	Panchavadi	"Manassinakathoru Paalaazhi"	M. K. Arjunan	Sreekumaran Thampi	Solo	
1973	Bhadradeepam	"Kaalindi Thadathile"	M. S. Baburaj	Vayalar Ramavarma	Solo	
1973	Bhadradeepam	"Kannukal Karinkoovala"	M. S. Baburaj	Vayalar Ramavarma	Solo	
1973	Udayam	"Chaale Chaalicha"	V. Dakshinamoorthy	P. Bhaskaran	Solo	
1973	Udayam	"Ente Makan Krishananunni"	V. Dakshinamoorthy	P. Bhaskaran	Solo	
1973	Udayam	"Kalayude Devi"	V. Dakshinamoorthy	Sreekumaran Thampi	Ambili	
1973	Veendum Prabhatham	"Aalolaneela Vilochanangal"	V. Dakshinamoorthy	P. Bhaskaran	K. J. Yesudas	
1973	Raakuyil	"Innathe Mohana"	Pukazhenthi	P. Bhaskaran	Solo	
1973	Raakuyil	"Shyaamasundari"	Pukazhenthi	P. Bhaskaran	Solo	
1973	Police Ariyaruthe	"Aarodum Mindaathe"	V. Dakshinamoorthy	Mankombu Gopalakrishnan	Solo	
1973	Police Ariyaruthe	"Kaarirumbaani"	V. Dakshinamoorthy	Mankombu Gopalakrishnan	Solo	
1973	Ladies Hostel	"Kaattaruvi Chilankaketti"	M. S. Baburaj	Sreekumaran Thampi	Solo	
1973	Soundaryapooja	"Hridayam Maya"	M. S. Baburaj	Sreekumaran Thampi	Solo	
1973	Swapnam	"Sharike En Sharike"	Salil Chowdhury	O. N. V. Kurup	Solo	
1973	Swapnam	"Mazhavilkodi"	Salil Chowdhury	O. N. V. Kurup	Solo	
1973	Kattuvithachavan	"Swargathilo Vivaham"	Peter; Reuben	Poovachal Khader	Solo	
1973	Kaadu	"Ambili Vidarum Ponmaanam"	Vedpal Verma	Sreekumaran Thampi	K. J. Yesudas	
1973	Kaadu	"En Chundil Raaganombaram"	Vedpal Verma	Sreekumaran Thampi	Solo	
1973	Pachanottukal	"Karakaviyum Kinginiyaaru"	M. K. Arjunan	Sreekumaran Thampi	Solo	
1973	Sasthram Jayichu Manushyan Thottu	"Eerezhulakam"	V. Dakshinamoorthy	Sreekumaran Thampi	V. Dakshinamoorthy	
1973	Driksakshi	"Odakkuzhal Vili"	V. Dakshinamoorthy	Sreekumaran Thampi	Solo	
1973	Driksakshi	"Oru Chumbanam"	V. Dakshinamoorthy	Sreekumaran Thampi	Solo	
1973	Ajnathavasam	"Udayasoubhagyathaarakayo"	M. K. Arjunan	Sreekumaran Thampi	K. J. Yesudas, Ariyoor Sadasivan	
1973	Azhakulla Saleena	"Kaalameghathoppi Vecha"	K. J. Yesudas	Vayalar Ramavarma	Solo	
1973	Thottavadi	"Aavemariya"	L. P. R. Varma	Vayalar Ramavarma	Solo	
1973	Manassu	"Ellaamarinjavan Nee Maathram"	M. S. Baburaj	P. Bhaskaran	Solo	
1973	Manassu	"Krishna Dayaamaya"	M. S. Baburaj	P. Bhaskaran	Solo	
1973	Poymughangal	"Abhinavajeevitha"	V. Dakshinamoorthy	P. Bhaskaran	Solo	
1973	Poymughangal	"Amme Amme Ellam"	V. Dakshinamoorthy	P. Bhaskaran	Solo	
1973	Abala	"Annarkkanna"	V. Dakshinamoorthy	Sreekumaran Thampi	Solo	
1973	Abala	"Pathivrithayaakanam"	V. Dakshinamoorthy	Puthukkad Krishnakumar	Solo	
1973	Thekkan Kattu	"Varillennu Chollunnu"	A. T. Ummer	P. Bhaskaran	Solo	
1973	Chuzhi	"Hridhyathil Nirayunna"	M. S. Baburaj	Sreekumaran Thampi	Solo	
1973	Padmavyooham	"Aadaminte Santhathikal"	M. K. Arjunan	Sreekumaran Thampi	Solo	
1973	Football Champion	"Pathinezho Pathinetto"	V. Dakshinamoorthy	Sreekumaran Thampi	Solo	
1974	Kamini	"Muralikayoothunna"	M. S. Baburaj	Zubair	Solo	
1974	Kamini	Aashicha Kadavil	M. S. Baburaj	Zubair	Solo	
1974	Manyasree Viswamithran	"Kanavu Neythoru"	Shyam	P. Bhaskaran	K. P. Brahmanandan	
1974	Oru Pidi Ari	"Poomarappoothile Thaamarakkuruvi"	A. T. Ummer	P. Bhaskaran	Solo	
1974	Oru Pidi Ari	"Atham Pathinu"	A. T. Ummer	P. Bhaskaran	Solo	
1974	Jeevikkan Marannupoya Sthree	"Maalineethadame"	M. S. Viswanathan	Vayalar Ramavarma	Solo	
1974	Jeevikkan Marannupoya Sthree	"Veenappoove"	M. S. Viswanathan	Vayalar Ramavarma	Solo	
1974	Chandrakantham	"Aa Nimishathinte Nirvrithiyil"	M. S. Viswanathan	Sreekumaran Thampi	Solo	
1974	Checkpost	"Thaalolam Kiliyude"	P. S. Divakar	P. Bhaskaran	Solo	
1974	Pathiravum Pakalvelichavum	"Nattu Nanaykkaathe"	K. Raghavan	Yusufali Kechery	Solo	
1974	Youvanam	"Daivame Deepame"	V. Dakshinamoorthy	Sreekumaran Thampi	Solo	
1974	Youvanam	"Madhurameenakshi"	V. Dakshinamoorthy	Sreekumaran Thampi	Solo	
1974	Youvanam	"Swarnappoonchola"	V. Dakshinamoorthy	Sreekumaran Thampi	K. J. Yesudas	
1974	Nathoon	"Kavilathu Kannoru"	M. S. Baburaj	Sreekumaran Thampi	Solo	
1974	Nathoon	"Yesumaathaave"	M. S. Baburaj	Sreekumaran Thampi	Solo	
1974	Night Duty	"Vilwamangalam Kandu"	V. Dakshinamoorthy	Vayalar Ramavarma	Solo	
1974	Alakal	"Chandanakkuri Chaarthi"	V. Dakshinamoorthy	Mankombu Gopalakrishnan	K. J. Yesudas, Ayiroor Sadasivan	
1974	Alakal	"Pournami Chandrikayil"	V. Dakshinamoorthy	Mankombu Gopalakrishnan	Solo	
1974	Aswathy	"Peraarin Theeratho"	V. Dakshinamoorthy	P. Bhaskaran	K. J. Yesudas	
1974	College Girl	"Anjanamizhikal"	M. K. Arjunan	Dr. Balakrishnan	K. J. Yesudas	
1974	Kanyakumari	"Chandrappalungu Manimaala"	M. B. Sreenivasan	Vayalar Ramavarma	K. J. Yesudas	
1974	Chakravakam	"Makayiram Nakshathram"	Shankar Ganesh	Vayalar Ramavarma	K. J. Yesudas	
1974	Chakravakam	"Makayiram Nakshathram (solo)"	Shankar Ganesh	Vayalar Ramavarma	Solo	
1974	Chanchala	"Sthreeye Neeyoru"	M. K. Arjunan	O. N. V. Kurup	Solo	
1974	Thacholi Marumakan Chandu	"Induchoodan Bhagavante"	V. Dakshinamoorthy	P. Bhaskaran	Solo	
1974	Thacholi Marumakan Chandu	"Vadakkini Thalathile"	V. Dakshinamoorthy	P. Bhaskaran	Solo	
1974	Thacholi Marumakan Chandu	"Kannalmizhi Kanimalare"	V. Dakshinamoorthy	P. Bhaskaran	K. J. Yesudas	
1974	Swarnavigraham	"Swarnavigrahame"	M. B. Sreenivasan	Mankombu Gopalakrishnan	K. J. Yesudas	
1974	Sapthaswarangal	"Anuraaga Narthanathil"	V. Dakshinamoorthy	Sreekumaran Thampi	Solo	
1974	Arakkallan Mukkalkkallan	"Mullappoom Pallilo"	V. Dakshinamoorthy	P. Bhaskaran	K. J. Yesudas	
1974	Arakkallan Mukkalkkallan	"Naranayingane"	V. Dakshinamoorthy	P. Bhaskaran	Solo	
1974	Arakkallan Mukkalkkallan	"Pachamalappanamkuruvi"	V. Dakshinamoorthy	P. Bhaskaran	Solo	
1974	Arakkallan Mukkalkkallan	"Thinkalmukhi"	V. Dakshinamoorthy	P. Bhaskaran	Solo	
1975	Chief Guest	"Madhumakshike"	A. T. Ummer	O. N. V. Kurup	Solo	
1975	Chief Guest	Thennithenni	A. T. Ummer	O. N. V. Kurup	Solo	
1975	Madhurappathinezhu	"Malsaram Malsaram"	A. T. Ummer	Sreekumaran Thampi	K. J. Yesudas	
1975	Madhurappathinezhu	"Uparodham Kondu Naam"	A. T. Ummer	Sreekumaran Thampi	Solo	
1975	Chumaduthangi	"Ethusheethalachaaya"	V. Dakshinamoorthy	P. Bhaskaran	K. J. Yesudas	
1975	Chumaduthangi	"Maanathoru Kaavadiyaattam"	V. Dakshinamoorthy	P. Bhaskaran	Solo	
1975	Akkaldaama	"Akkaldaamathan"	Shyam	Bharanikkavu Sivakumar	K. P. Brahmanandan	
1975	Criminals	"Purushanmarude Gandham"	M. S. Baburaj	Poovachal Khader	Solo	
1975	Ninne Pinne Kandolaam	"Hemantha Ramacha"	Satyam	Poochakkal Shahul Hameed	P. Jayachandran	
1975	Kalyana Sougandhikam	"Chandana Mukilin"	Pukazhenthi	P. Bhaskaran	S. T. Sasidharan	
1975	Prayanam	"Mounangal Padukayayirunnu"	M. B. Sreenivasan	M. B. Sreenivasan	K. J. Yesudas	
1975	Odakkuzhal	"Dukhadevathe Unaroo"	M. K. Arjunan	Vayalar Ramavarma	Solo	
1975	Njan Ninne Premikkunnu	"Manasse Ashwasikkoo"	M. S. Baburaj	Bichu Thirumala	Solo	
1975	Neela Ponman	"Kannil Meenadum"	Salil Chowdhury	Vayalar Ramavarma	B. Vasantha	
1975	Neela Ponman	"Kilu Kilum	Salil Chowdhury	Vayalar Ramavarma		
1975	Neela Ponman	"Poomaala Ponkuzhali"	Salil Chowdhury	Vayalar Ramavarma		
1975	Dharmakshetre Kurukshetre	"Chanchalitha"	M. S. Viswanathan	Vayalar Ramavarma	K. J. Yesudas	
1975	Dharmakshetre Kurukshetre	Manassoru Swapnakhani"	M. S. Viswanathan	Vayalar Ramavarma	K. J. Yesudas	
1975	Sooryavamsham	"Erinjaal Kollunna"	M. K. Arjunan	Vayalar Ramavarma	Solo	
1975	Raagam	"Ivide Kaattinu Sugandham"	Salil Chowdhury	Vayalar Ramavarma	K. J. Yesudas	
1975	Ashtamirohini	"Navarathna Pedakam"	M. K. Arjunan	Sreekumaran Thampi	Solo	
1975	Padmaragam	"Poonilaave Vaa"	M. K. Arjunan	Sreekumaran Thampi	Solo	
1975	Utsavam	"Aadyasamaagama Lajjayil"	A. T. Ummer	Poovachal Khader	K. J. Yesudas	
1975	Utsavam	"Swayamvarathinu"	A. T. Ummer	Poovachal Khader	K. J. Yesudas	
1975	Kuttichaathan	"Kaaveri Kaaveri"	R. K. Shekhar	Vayalar Ramavarma	Solo	
1975	Aval Oru Thudarkatha	"Kannile"	M. S. Viswanathan	Vayalar Ramavarma	Solo	
1976	Priyamvada	"Maanikya Sreekovil"	V. Dakshinamoorthy	Sreekumaran Thampi	K. J. Yesudas	
1976	Priyamvada	Maanikya Sreekovil (sad)	V. Dakshinamoorthy	Sreekumaran Thampi	K. J. Yesudas	
1976	Yakshagaanam	"Nisheedhini Nisheedhini"	M. S. Viswanathan	Vayalar Ramavarma	Solo	
1976	Yakshagaanam	Pokaam Namakku	M. S. Viswanathan	Vayalar Ramavarma	Solo	
1976	Appooppan	"Anandakuttaninnu Pirannaalu"	M. S. Baburaj	P. Bhaskaran	Solo	
1976	Srishti	"Nithyakaamuki Ninne"	M. S. Baburaj	O. N. V. Kurup	Solo	
1976	Samasya	"Adithottu Mudiyolam"	Shyam	P. Bhaskaran	Solo	
1976	Swapnadanam	"Swarga Gopura Vaathil"	Bhaskar Chandavarkar	P. J. Eezhakkadavu	Solo	
1976	Thulavarsham	"Swapnadaanam"	Salil Chowdhury	Chowalloor Krishnankutty	Solo	
1976	Thulavarsham	"Yamune Nee Ozhuku"	Salil Chowdhury	Vayalar Ramavarma	K. J. Yesudas	
1976	Thulavarsham	"Paarayidukkil Mannundo"	V. Dakshinamoorthy	P. Bhaskaran	Kamala, Selma George	
1976	Prasaadam	"Pulayanar Maniyamma"	V. Dakshinamoorthy	P. Bhaskaran	Solo	
1976	Kaayamkulam Kochunniyude Makan	"Swapnangal Thaazhikakkudam"	M. K. Arjunan	Pappanamkodu Lakshmanan	K. J. Yesudas	
1976	Chirikkudukka	"Madhuramadhuramen"	Shankar-Ganesh	Yusufali Kechery	Solo	
1976	Sexilla Stundilla	"Yaa Illahi"	V. Dakshinamoorthy	Sreekumaran Thampi	Solo	
1976	Njavalppazhangal	"Amme Amme Amme"	Shyam	Mullanezhi	P. Jayachandran	
1976	Njavalppazhangal	"Thurakkoo Mizhithurakkoo"	Shyam	Mullanezhi	Solo	
1976	Sindhooram	"Sindorapushpavana Chakoram"	A. T. Ummer	Bharanikkavu Sivakumar	Solo	
1976	Anubhavam	"Kuruvikal Osana Paadum"	A. T. Ummer	Bichu Thirumala	Solo	
1976	Anubhavam	"Souramayookham"	A. T. Ummer	Bichu Thirumala	K. J. Yesudas, Anita Reddy	
1976	Kuttavum Shikshayum	"Aavani Poorna"	M. S. Viswanathan	Mankombu Gopalakrishnan	Solo	
1976	Aayiram Janmangal	"Uthama Mahila Manikyam"	M. S. Viswanathan	P. Bhaskaran	Raveendran, M. S. Viswanathan, Shakeela Balakrishnan, Saibaba	
1976	Madhuram Thirumadhuram	"Thaazhvarayil Manju Peythu"	A. T. Ummer	Ravi Vallathol	Cochin Ibrahim	
1976	Madhuram Thirumadhuram	"Vedana Vilichothi"	A. T. Ummer	Muppathu Ramachandran	Solo	
1976	Maanasaveena	"Thulasi Vivaaha Naaalil"	M. L. Srikanth	Sreekumaran Thampi	Solo	
1976	Neela Sari	"Priyadarshini Nin"	V. Dakshinamoorthy	Pappanamkodu Lakshmanan	Solo	
1976	Aalinganam	"Thushaarabindukkale"	A. T. Ummer	Bichu Thirumala	Solo	
1976	Abhinandanam	"Pathu Paisaakkoru"	Kannur Rajan	Sreekumaran Thampi	Solo	
1976	Amrithavaahini	"Abhayadeepame"	A. T. Ummer	Sreekumaran Thampi	Solo	
1976	Amrithavaahini	"Kodunkaatte Nee"	A. T. Ummer	Sreekumaran Thampi	Solo	
1977	Dheerasameere Yamuna Theere	"Dheerasameere Yamuna Theere"	Shyam	O. N. V. Kurup	K. J. Yesudas	
1977	Dheerasameere Yamuna Theere	Manassinte Thaalukalkkidayil	Shyam	O. N. V. Kurup	Solo	
1977	Thuruppu Gulan	"Kanmani Nin"	V. Dakshinamoorthy	Sreekumaran Thampi	K. J. Yesudas	
1977	Thuruppu Gulan	Enthu Cheyyendu	V. Dakshinamoorthy	Sreekumaran Thampi	K. J. Yesudas	
1977	Allahu Akbar	"Ambilikkaarayilunniyappam"	M. S. Baburaj	P. Bhaskaran	Solo	
1977	Panchamrutham	"Meghangal Thazhum"	A. T. Ummer	Sreekumaran Thampi	K. J. Yesudas	
1977	Aparadhi	"Muraleedhara Mukunda"	Salil Chowdhury	P. Bhaskaran	Solo	
1977	Sankhupushpam	"Aayiram Ajantha"	M. K. Arjunan	Sreekumaran Thampi	K. J. Yesudas	
1977	Madhura Swapanam	"Tharunya Pushpavanathil"	M. K. Arjunan	Sreekumaran Thampi	P. Jayachandran	
1977	Rajaparambara	"Snehikkan Padichoru"	A. T. Ummer	Bharanikkavu Sivakumar	Solo	
1977	Saritha	"Hemanthathin"	Shyam	Sathyan Anthikkad	Solo	
1977	Kannappanunni	"Ithiri Mullappoo Mottalla"	K. Raghavan	P. Bhaskaran	Solo	
1977	Vishukkani	"Malarkkodipole"	Salil Chowdhury	Sreekumaran Thampi	Solo	
1977	Angeekaaram	"Neelajalahsayathil"	A. T. Ummer	Bichu Thirumala	Solo	
1977	Angeekaaram	"Shishiramaasa Sandhyayile"	A. T. Ummer	Bichu Thirumala	Solo	
1977	Abhinivesham	"Mareechike Mareechike"	Shyam	Sreekumaran Thampi	K. J. Yesudas	
1977	Ashtamangalyam	"Munthiri Neerinu"	M. K. Arjunan	Kanam E. J.	Solo	
1977	Yatheem	"Maanathu Sandhya"	M. S. Baburaj	P. Bhaskaran	Solo	
1977	Aaraadhana	"Aaraaro Aariraaro"	K. J. Joy	Bichu Thirumala	K. J. Yesudas	
1977	Aaraadhana	"Pon Thaamarakal"	K. J. Joy	Bichu Thirumala	K. J. Yesudas	
1977	Aaraadhana	"Thaalam Thaalathil"	K. J. Joy	Bichu Thirumala	K. J. Yesudas	
1977	Ammaayi Amma	"Aattinkutti Thullichaadi"	A. T. Ummer	Anukuttan	Solo	
1977	Ammaayi Amma	"Mazhavil Maanathinte Maaril"	A. T. Ummer	Anukuttan	K. J. Yesudas	
1977	Muhoorthangal	"Pakalkkili Parannu Poyi"	M. K. Arjunan	O. N. V. Kurup	Solo	
1977	Taxi Driver	"Raareeraarooo"	Joshi	O. N. V. Kurup	Solo	
1977	Jagadguru Aadisankaran	"Kumudini Priyathamanudichu"	V. Dakshinamoorthy	P. Bhaskaran	Solo	
1977	Aparaajitha	"Varnnavum Neeye"	A. T. Ummer	Sreekumaran Thampi	K. J. Yesudas	
1977	Aparaajitha	"Varnnavum Neeye (sad)"	A. T. Ummer	Sreekumaran Thampi	K. J. Yesudas	
1977	Hridayame Sakshi	"Vasanthame Nee Vannu"	M. S. Viswanathan	Sreekumaran Thampi	Solo	
1977	Sooryakanthi	"Maanathaare"	Jaya-Vijaya	Dr. Pavithran	P. Jayachandran	
1977	Pattalam Janaki	"Koottalaayoru Kili"	K. J. Joy	Bharanikkavu Sivakumar	Solo	
1977	Akshayapaathram	"Kannante Chundathu"	M. S. Viswanathan	Sreekumaran Thampi	K. J. Yesudas	
1977	Akshayapaathram	"Manassoru Thaamarapoyka"	M. S. Viswanathan	Sreekumaran Thampi	Solo	
1977	Swarna Medal	"Ponnu Pootha Maanathu"	Joseph Krishna	Thomas Parannoor	Solo	
1977	Swarna Medal	"Oonjaalattaan"	Joseph Krishna	Augustine Vanchimala	Solo	
1978	Gaandharvam	"Arayil Kidakkumen"	M. S. Baburaj	P. Bhaskaran	Solo	
1978	Aanayum Ambaariyum	"Kandanaal Muthal"	Shyam	Bharanikkavu Sivakumar	Solo	
1978	Kaithappoo	"Kaatte Vaa Kaatte Vaa"	Shyam	Bichu Thirumala	P. Susheela	
1978	Kaithappoo	"Sarigama Paadunna"	Shyam	Bichu Thirumala	P. Susheela	
1978	Agni	"Mullappoomanam Veeshum"	A. T. Ummer	Sakunthala Rajendran	Solo	
1978	Madanolsavam	"Sandhye Kanneerithenthe"	Salil Chowdhury	O. N. V. Kurup	Solo	
1978	Madanolsavam	"Ee Malarkanyakal"	Salil Chowdhury	O. N. V. Kurup	Solo	
1978	Orkkuka Vallappozhum	"Kollaathe Kollunna"	A. T. Ummer	P. Bhaskaran	K. J. Yesudas	
1978	Orkkuka Vallappozhum	"Swapnamandaakini Theerathu"	A. T. Ummer	P. Bhaskaran	Solo	
1978	Kaathirunna Nimisham	"Maavuppoothu"	M. K. Arjunan	Sreekumaran Thampi	Solo	
1978	Rowdy Ramu	"Manjin Thereri"	Shyam	Bichu Thirumala	Vani Jairam	
1978	Velluvili	"Mukilukale"	M. S. Viswanathan	Bichu Thirumala	Solo	
1978	Avalude Ravukal	"Raagendu Kiranangal"	A. T. Ummer	Bichu Thirumala	Solo	
1978	Avalude Ravukal	"Unni Aaraariro"	A. T. Ummer	Bichu Thirumala	Solo	
1978	Kalpavriksham	"Madhyamo Maayayo"	V. Dakshinamoorthy	Chirayinkeezhu Ramakrishnan Nair	Solo	
1978	Kalpavriksham	"Vaidoorya Rathnamala"	V. Dakshinamoorthy	Chirayinkeezhu Ramakrishnan Nair	Solo	
1978	Randilonnu	"Panchavankattile"	M. S. Viswanathan	Mankombu Gopalakrishnan	M. S. Viswanathan	
1978	Priyadarshini	"Chirichu Chirichu"	M. K. Arjunan	Vayalar Ramavarma	Solo	
1978	Maattoly	"Aakaasham Swarnam"	Jaya-Vijaya	Bichu Thirumala	K. P. Brahmanandan	
1978	Maattoly	"Vannaatte Varivari Ninnaatte"	Jaya-Vijaya	Bichu Thirumala	Solo	
1978	Black Belt	"Maamala Vaazhum"	Shyam	Bharanikkavu Sivakumar	Vani Jairam	
1978	Vyaamoham	"Neeyo Njaano"	Ilaiyaraaja	Dr. Pavithran	P. Jayachandran	
1978	Vyaamoham	"Poovadikalil"	Ilaiyaraaja	Dr. Pavithran	K. J. Yesudas	
1978	Vyaamoham	"Poovadikalil"	Ilaiyaraaja	Dr. Pavithran	Solo	
1978	Ithaa Oru Manushyan	"Mayiline Kandorikkal"	M. S. Viswanathan	Sreekumaran Thampi	P. Jayachandran	
1978	Ithaa Oru Manushyan	"Sharathkaalachandrika Vidaparanju"	M. S. Viswanathan	Sreekumaran Thampi	Solo	
1978	Avakaasham	"Muralee Neeyoru Gaanam"	M. K. Arjunan	Gopi Kottarapat	Solo	
1978	Ahalya	"Lalitha Sahasranamam"	K. J. Joy	Bichu Thirumala	Solo	
1978	Ahalya	"Happy Music"	K. J. Joy	Bichu Thirumala	B. Vasantha	
1978	Aval Kanda Lokam	"Thushara Bindukkale"	M. K. Arjunan	Sreekumaran Thampi	Solo	
1978	Adavukal Pathinettu	"Sooryanamaskaram"	A. T. Ummer	Bichu Thirumala	Solo	
1978	Adavukal Pathinettu	"Thaamarapoonkulakkadavinu"	A. T. Ummer	Bichu Thirumala	Solo	
1978	Raghuvamsham	"Veena Vaayikkum"	A. T. Ummer	Anwar Suber	Idava Basheer	
1978	Seemanthini	"Nalina Vanathil"	Jaya-Vijaya	Biju Ponneth	K. J. Yesudas	
1978	Pichipoo	"Kaamadevan Karimbinaal"	Jaya-Vijaya	P. Bhaskaran	Solo	
1978	Ithaanente Vazhi	"Manideepanalam"	K. J. Joy	Bichu Thirumala	Solo	
1978	Ithaanente Vazhi	"Meele Neelaakaasham"	K. J. Joy	Bichu Thirumala	Solo	
1978	Ithaanente Vazhi	"Somarasa Shaalakal"	K. J. Joy	Bichu Thirumala	P. Jayachandran	
1978	Soothrakkaari	"Ekaanthathayil"	A. T. Ummer	Bichu Thirumala	Solo	
1978	Soothrakkaari	"Vellappalunkotha"	A. T. Ummer	Bichu Thirumala	K. J. Yesudas	
1978	Chakraayudham	"Thamburaane Thirumeni"	K. J. Joy	Mankombu Gopalakrishnan	Solo	
1978	Randu Janmam	"Adimudi Aninjorungi"	M. G. Radhakrishnan	Kavalam Narayana Panicker	K. J. Yesudas	
1978	Randu Janmam	"Maamalakudannayil"	M. G. Radhakrishnan	Kavalam Narayana Panicker	Solo	
1978	Urakkam Varaatha Raathrikal	"Thiramaala Thedunnu"	Shyam	Bichu Thirumala	Solo	
1978	Asthamayam	"Rathilayam Rathilayam"	Shyam	Sathyan Anthikkad	K. J. Yesudas	
1978	Ashokavanam	"Premathin Lahariyil"	V. Dakshinamoorthy	Vellanad Narayanan	Ambili	
1978	Anubhoothikalude Nimisham	"Evideyaa Mohathin"	A. T. Ummer	Sreekumaran Thampi	Solo	
1978	Bhrashtu	"Neeyevide Kanna"	M. S. Baburaj	Naatikka Sivaram	Solo	
1978	Bhrashtu	"Veli Kazhinja"	M. S. Baburaj	Naatikka Sivaram	Solo	
1978	Hemantharaathri	"Madanonmaada Raathri"	A. T. Ummer	Bichu Thirumala	Solo	
1978	Hemantharaathri	"Rajathakamalangal"	A. T. Ummer	Bichu Thirumala	P. Susheela	
1978	Sundarimaarude Swapnangal	"Janmam Nediyethenthinu"	M. S. Viswanathan	Chirayinkeezhu Ramakrishnan Nair	Solo	
1978	Aaravam	"Kaattil Thekkanam Kaattil"	M. G. Radhakrishnan	Kavalam Narayana Panicker	Solo	
1978	Madaalasa	"Amruthozhukum Gaanam"	K. J. Joy	Yusufali Kechery	Solo	
1978	Snehikkan Samayamilla	"Sandhye Nee Vaavaa"	A. T. Ummer	Dr. Balakrishnan	P. Jayachandran	
1978	Ee Ganam Marakkumo	"Ee Kaikalil"	Salil Chowdhury	O. N. V. Kurup	Solo	
1978	Tiger Salim	"Chingathennal"	Shyam	Bichu Thirumala	K. J. Yesudas	
1978	Tiger Salim	"Roopa Lavanyame"	Shyam	Bichu Thirumala	K. J. Yesudas	
1978	Tiger Salim	"Jil Jil Enna"	Shyam	Bichu Thirumala	Solo	
1979	Angakkuri	"Somabimba Vadana"	A. T. Ummer	Bichu Thirumala	Solo	
1979	Raathrikal Ninakku Vendi	"Kamaladalangal"	A. T. Ummer	Mankombu Gopalakrishnan	Solo	
1979	Pichathy Kuttappan	"Annanada Ponnala"	K. Raghavan	Yusufali Kechery	Solo	
1979	Driver Madyapichirunnu	"Onnuriyaadaan"	K. Raghavan	Kallada Sasi	Solo	
1979	Ival Oru Naadody	"Manmadha Manjariyil"	S. D. Shekhar	Dr. Shahjahan	Malaysia Vasudevan	
1979	Kalliyankattu Neeli	"Nizhalaay Ozhukivarum"	Shyam	Bichu Thirumala	Solo	
1979	Vadaka Veedu	"Sugama Sangeetham"	M. S. Viswanathan	Bichu Thirumala	Solo	
1979	Shuddhikalasham	"Yauvanam Thanna Veenayil"	Shyam	Sreekumaran Thampi	Solo	
1979	Shuddhikalasham	"Mounaragappainkili Nin"	Shyam	Sreekumaran Thampi	Solo	
1979	Kaumarapraayam	"Ee Raavil Njan"	Shyam	Chunakkara Ramankutty	Solo	
1979	Irumbazhikal	"Pramadavanathil Rithumathippoo"	M. K. Arjunan	R. K. Damodaran	Solo	
1979	Lovely	"Innatthe Raathrikku"	M. K. Arjunan	T. V. Gopalakrishnan	Solo	
1979	Lovely	"Raathri Sisira Raathri"	M. K. Arjunan	T. V. Gopalakrishnan	Solo	
1979	Enikku Njaan Swantham	"Medamaasakkaalam"	Shyam	Bichu Thirumala	Solo	
1979	Enikku Njaan Swantham	"Melam Unmaadathaalam"	Shyam	Bichu Thirumala	P. Jayachandran	
1979	Ente Sneham Ninakku Mathram	"Saayamkaalam"	Shyam	Bichu Thirumala	Solo	
1979	Itha Oru Theeram	"Premamenna Kalayil"	K. J. Joy	Yusufali Kechery	Solo	
1979	Anupallavi	"Ore Raaga Pallavi"	K. J. Joy	Bichu Thirumala	K. J. Yesudas	
1979	Radha Enna Pennkutti	"Irulala Churulu Nivarthum"	Shyam	Devadas	Solo	
1979	Mani Koya Kurup	"Chadukudu Chadukudu"	M. S. Viswanathan	P. Bhaskaran	P. Jayachandran	
1979	Kannukal	"Jyothirmayi Nee"	V. Dakshinamoorthy	Ravi Vilangan	Solo	
1979	Aval Niraparaadhi	"Kannile Neelapushpam"	A. T. Ummer	Yusufali Kechery	Solo	
1979	Vijayanum Veeranum	"Madhyamo Maayayo"	A. T. Ummer	Chirayinkeezhu Ramakrishnan Nair	Solo	
1979	Vijayanum Veeranum	"Udyaanapushpame"	A. T. Ummer	Chirayinkeezhu Ramakrishnan Nair	K. J. Yesudas	
1979	Agni Vyooham	"Yaaminee"	A. T. Ummer	Sathyan Anthikkad	Solo	
1979	Nakshathrangale Sakshi	"Thaalipoovum Kalyanapudavum"	K. J. Joy	Sathyan Anthikkad	Solo	
1979	Edavazhiyile Poocha Minda Poocha	"Viswa Mahakshetra"	M. B. Sreenivasan	Yusufali Kechery	Solo	
1979	Edavazhiyile Poocha Minda Poocha	"Vivaahanaalil"	M. B. Sreenivasan	Yusufali Kechery	Solo	
1979	Manasa Vacha Karmana	"Prabhaatham Poomarakkombil"	A. T. Ummer	Bichu Thirumala	Solo	
1979	Maamaankam	"Theeraatha Dukhatthil"	K. Raghavan	P. Bhaskaran	Solo	
1979	Chuvanna Chirakukal	"Yaminee Devi"	Salil Chowdhury	O. N. V. Kurup	Solo	
1979	Chuvanna Chirakukal	"Bhoomi Nandini Nin"	Salil Chowdhury	O. N. V. Kurup	Solo	
1979	Prabhu	"Aaramadevathamaare"	Shankar Ganesh	Ettumanoor Sreekumar	Solo	
1979	Choola	"Sindhoora Sadhyaykku Mounam"	Raveendran	Poovachal Khader	K. J. Yesudas	
1979	Pathivritha	"Kalam Kalam Malarmelam"	M. S. Viswanathan	Bichu Thirumala	Solo	
1979	Thakara	"Mouname"	M. G. Radhakrishnan	Poovachal Khader	Solo	
1979	Thakara	"Kudayolam Bhoomi"	M. G. Radhakrishnan	Poovachal Khader	K. J. Yesudas	
1979	Puthiya Velicham	"Manasse Nin Ponnambalam"	Salil Chowdhury	Sreekumaran Thampi	Solo	
1979	Ivide Kattinu Sugandam	"Ivide Kattinu Sugandham"	K. J. Joy	Bichu Thirumala	K. J. Yesudas	
1979	Iniyathra	"Kaanaathe Nee Vannu"	Shyam	Poovachal Khader	Solo	
1979	Iniyathra	"Karayaan Polum Kazhiyaathe"	Shyam	Poovachal Khader	Solo	
1979	Aadipaapam	"Aadipaapam Paarilinnum"	Shyam	Poovachal Khader	Solo	
1979	Pambaram	"Vaarika Nee Vasanthame"	A. T. Ummer	Chirayinkeezhu Ramakrishnan Nair	Jolly Abraham	
1979	Pratheeksha	"Kochu Swapnangal"	Salil Chowdhury	O. N. V. Kurup	Solo	
1979	Pratheeksha	"Nerukayil Nee"	Salil Chowdhury	O. N. V. Kurup	Solo	
1979	Tharangam	"Mazhamukil Mayangi"	K. J. Joy	Chirayinkeezhu Ramakrishnan Nair	K. J. Yesudas	
1979	Sandhya Raagam	"Onnaaman"	K. Raghavan	P. Bhaskaran	Solo	
1979	Neeyo Njaano	"Kaadupoothathu"	Shyam	Sathyan Anthikkad	C. O. Anto	
1979	Neeyo Njaano	"Thenmullapoove"	Shyam	Sathyan Anthikkad	Solo	
1979	Raajaveedhi	"Panineeraninja"	A. T. Ummer	Bichu Thirumala	Solo	
1979	Aavesham	"Maan Maan Maan"	A. T. Ummer	Bichu Thirumala	Solo	
1979	Prabhaathasandhya	"Chandanalathakalilonnu"	Shyam	Sreekumaran Thampi	K. J. Yesudas	
1979	Pushyaraagam	"Oru Manikingini"	A. T. Ummer	Sakunthala Rajendran	K. J. Yesudas	
1979	Pushyaraagam	"Pathupetta"	A. T. Ummer	Sakunthala Rajendran	Solo	
1979	Sikharangal	"Ninakku Njaan Swantham"	K. J. Joy	Dr. Pavithran	Solo	
1979	Aarattu	"Ee Manjaveyilpoo"	A. T. Ummer	Bichu Thirumala	Solo	

=== 1980s ===
Year	Film	Song	Music director	Writer	Co-singer	Ref
1980	Kadalkkaattu	"Ozhuki Ozhuki Oduvilee"	A. T. Ummer	Bichu Thirumala	K. J. Yesudas	
1980	Aarohanam	"Ore Raagageetham"	Shyam	Poovachal Khader	Solo	
1980	Kari Puranda Jeevithangal	"Shabdhaprapancham"	M. K. Arjunan	Chirayinkeezhu Ramakrishnan Nair	Solo	
1980	Kochu Kochu Thettukal	"Prabhaatha Gaanangal"	Shyam	Bichu Thirumala	Solo	
1980	Dooram Arike	"Paalaruvi Paadivaru"	Ilaiyaraaja	O. N. V. Kurup	Solo	
1980	Love in Singapore	"Madamilakanu Meyyake"	Shankar Ganesh	Ettumanoor Sreekumar	P. Jayachandran	
1980	Love in Singapore	"Njaan Raaja"	Shankar Ganesh	Ettumanoor Sreekumar	P. Jayachandran	
1980	Love in Singapore	"Rithulayamunarunnu	Shankar Ganesh	Ettumanoor Sreekumar	P. Jayachandran	
1980	Ammayum Makalum	"Kuyile"	Shyam	O. N. V. Kurup	Solo	
1980	Ammayum Makalum	"Thatthammapenninu"	Shyam	O. N. V. Kurup	Solo	
1980	Agni Kshethram	"Pon Kamalangalum"	K. J. Joy	Madhu Alappuzha	Solo	
1980	Benz Vasu	"Ragaraga Pakshi"	A. T. Ummer	B. Manikyam	Solo	
1980	Benz Vasu	"Swapnam Swayamvaramaayi"	A. T. Ummer	B. Manikyam	K. J. Yesudas	
1980	Angadi	"Kannum Kannum"	Shyam	Bichu Thirumala	K. J. Yesudas	
1980	Angadi	"Life is Just Like"	Shyam	Bichu Thirumala	Jomon	
1980	Kaavalmaadam	"Vayanaadan Kulirinte"	A. T. Ummer	Sathyan Anthikkad	Vani Jairam	
1980	Vilkkanundu Swapnangal	"Bhoothalam Ninte Bhadrasanam"	M. B. Sreenivasan	Sreedharanunni	Solo	
1980	Mr. Michael	"Vaasantha Mandaanilan"	K. Chakravarthy	Bichu Thirumala	K. J. Yesudas	
1980	Mr. Michael	"Sangeetha Marathaka"	K. Chakravarthy	Yusufali Kechery	Solo	
1980	Maro Charitra	"Pathinezhaam Vayassil"	M. S. Viswanathan	Mankombu Gopalakrishnan	Solo	
1980	Idi Muzhakkam	"Kaalam Thelinju"	Shyam	Sreekumaran Thampi	P. Jayachandran	
1980	Saraswathi Yaamam	"Kulirilam"	A. T. Ummer	Vellanad Narayanan	Solo	
1980	Kaantha Valayam	"Palliyankanathil"	Shyam	Ettumanoor Somadasan	Solo	
1980	Chamaram	"Naadha Nee Varum"	M. G. Radhakrishnan	Poovachal Khader	Solo	
1980	Thaliritta Kinakkal	"En Mooka Vishadham"	Jithin Shyam	Jamal Kochangadi	Solo	
1980	Youvanam Daaham	"Kili Kili Panikili"	M. G. Radhakrishnan	Kaniyapuram Ramachandran	Solo	
1980	Aniyaatha Valakal	"Madiyil Mayangunna"	A. T. Ummer	Bichu Thirumala	Solo	
1980	Aniyaatha Valakal	"Oru Mayilpeeliyayi Njaan"	A. T. Ummer	Bichu Thirumala	Bichu Thirumala	
1980	Sakthi	"Mizhiyilennum Nee Choodum"	K. J. Joy	Bichu Thirumala	Gopan	
1980	Sakthi	"Thennale Thoomanam"	K. J. Joy	Bichu Thirumala	Solo	
1980	Lorry	"Arinju Naam Thammil"	M. S. Viswanathan	Poovachal Khader	Solo	
1980	Swarga Devatha	"Krishnashilaathala Hrudayangale"	M. S. Viswanathan	Mankombu Gopalakrishnan	Solo	
1980	Hridhayam Paadunnu	"Thechippoove Mizhithurakku"	K. J. Joy	Yusufali Kechery	K. J. Yesudas	
1980	Swandam Enna Padam	"Aarambhamevide"	Shyam	Sreekumaran Thampi	K. J. Yesudas	
1980	Swandam Enna Padam	"Raagangal Than Raagam"	Shyam	Sreekumaran Thampi		
1980	Shishirathil Oru Vasantham	"Nenjil Nenchu"	Shyam	Poovachal Khader	Solo	
1980	Karimpana	"Karimbaarakalkkillilum Kanmadam"	A. T. Ummer	Bichu Thirumala	Solo	
1980	Oru Varsham Oru Maasam	"Murukiya Izhakalil"	Raveendran	Poovachal Khader	Solo	
1980	Oormakale Vida Tharu	"Jeevitha Nritham"	K. J. Joy	Dr. Pavithran	Solo	
1980	Pappu	"Kurumozhi Koonthalil"	K. J. Joy	Bichu Thirumala	K. J. Yesudas	
1980	Muthuchippikal	"Alakayilo"	K. J. Joy	A. P. Gopalan	Solo	
1980	Moorkhan	"Shaarada Sandhyaykku"	A. T. Ummer	B. Manikyam	K. J. Yesudas	
1980	Naayattu	"Enne Njaan Marannu"	Shyam	Sreekumaran Thampi	Jolly Abraham	
1980	Aagamanam	"Krishnavarnna Meni"	Vidyadharan	O. N. V. Kurup	Solo	
1980	Sathyam	"Swapnam Kandu Njaan"	A. T. Ummer	Bichu Thirumala	K. J. Yesudas	
1980	Manushya Mrugam	"Ajantha Shilpangalil"	K. J. Joy	Pappanamkodu Lakshmanan	P. Jayachandran	
1980	Ashwaradham	"Thulaavarsha Melam"	Shyam	Mankombu Gopalakrishnan	K. J. Yesudas	
1980	Ashwaradham	"Ushamalarikal"	Shyam	Mankombu Gopalakrishnan	Solo	
1980	Manjil Virinja Pookkal	"Manjani Kombil"	Jerry Amaldev	Bichu Thirumala	Solo	
1980	Manjil Virinja Pookkal	"Mizhiyoram"	Jerry Amaldev	Bichu Thirumala	Solo	
1980	Manjil Virinja Pookkal	"Mizhiyoram (Revival)"	Jerry Amaldev	Bichu Thirumala	Solo	
1980	Sankarabharanam	"Saamajavaragamana"	K. V. Mahadevan	Thyagaraja	S. P. Balasubrahmanyam	
1981	Ariyappedatha Rahasyam	"Vaasara Kshetrathil"	M. K. Arjunan	P. Bhaskaran	Solo	
1981	Greeshma Jwala	"Thirunelli Kaadu"	A. T. Ummer	Poovachal Khader	Solo	
1981	Kalopaasana	"Pandu Pandoru"	K. Raghavan	Poovachal Khader	Manoharan	
1981	Aakkramanam	"Muthukudayenthi"	Shyam	Sreekumaran Thampi	K. J. Yesudas	
1981	Aakkramanam	"Peethambaradhaariyitha"	Shyam	Sreekumaran Thampi	Solo	
1981	Sanchari	"Anuraaga Vallari"	K. J. Yesudas	Yusufali Kechery	K. J. Yesudas	
1981	Sanchari	"Thaliraninju Malaraninju"	K. J. Yesudas	Yusufali Kechery	K. J. Yesudas	
1981	Asthamikkatha Pakalukal	"Ithirippoovinu"	A. T. Ummer	Sathyan Anthikkad	Solo	
1981	Abhinayam	"Amminjappaalinnilamchundu"	K. J. Yesudas	Vijayan	Solo	
1981	Oppol	"Ettumaanoorambalathil Ezhunnallathu"	M. B. Sreenivasan	P. Bhaskaran	Solo	
1981	Sphodanam	"Maari Maari Poomaari"	Shankar Ganesh	O. N. V. Kurup	Solo	
1981	Chootthattam	"Koottilirunnu Paattukkal Paadaam"	Shyam	Chunakkara Ramankutti	Ambili	
1981	Thushaaram	"Manje Vaa Madhuvidu Vaa"	Shyam	Yusufali Kechery	S. P. Balasubrahmanyam, K. J. Yesudas	
1981	Thushaaram	"Youvanam Poovanam"	Shyam	Yusufali Kechery	Solo	
1981	Valarthumrugangal	"Oru Murikkannadiyilonnu Nokki"	M. B. Sreenivasan	M. T. Vasudevan Nair	Solo	
1981	Veliyattam	"Kalyaana Melangal"	M. K. Arjunan	Poovachal Khader	K. J. Yesudas	
1981	Venal	"Kaantha Mridulasmera"	M. B. Sreenivasan	Kavalam Narayana Panicker	Solo	
1981	Sangharsham	"Kandu Kandarinju"	Shankar Ganesh	Bichu Thirumala	P. Jayachandran	
1981	Avathaaram	"Chingappennin"	A. T. Ummer	Sathyan Anthikkad	Solo	
1981	Garjanam	"Ente Pularkkalam"	Ilaiyaraaja	Sreekumaran Thampi	P. Jayachandran	
1981	Garjanam	"Oru Mohathin"	Ilaiyaraaja	Sreekumaran Thampi	P. Jayachandran	
1981	Garjanam	"Vannathu Nallathu"	Ilaiyaraaja	Sreekumaran Thampi	P. Jayachandran	
1981	Attimari	"Pakaraam Njaan"	K. J. Joy	Pappanamkodu Lakshmanan	Solo	
1981	Prema Geethangal	"Swapnam Verumoru Swapnam"	Johnson	Devadas	K. J. Yesudas	
1981	Sambhavam	"Vayalinnoru Kalyanam"	V. Dakshinamoorthy	Sathyan Anthikkad	K. J. Yesudas	
1981	Manassinte Theerthayathra	"Neeyetho Mounasangeetham"	M. B. Sreenivasan	O. N. V. Kurup	Solo	
1981	Manassinte Theerthayathra	"Nishakudeeram"	M. B. Sreenivasan	O. N. V. Kurup	Solo	
1981	Adima Changala	"Kaayal Naabhi"	M. K. Arjunan	R. K. Damodaran	Solo	
1981	Adima Changala	"Madarajani"	M. K. Arjunan	R. K. Damodaran	Solo	
1981	Archana Teacher	"Oro Nimishavum"	Shyam	Sreekumaran Thampi	P. Jayachandran	
1981	Ilaneer	"Ee Thaalam"	Shyam	Sithara Venu	K. J. Yesudas	
1981	Ilaneer	"Malavaakapoove"	Shyam	Vayanar Vallabhan	Solo	
1981	Thrishna	"Mainaakam Kadalil Ninnuyarunnuvo"	Shyam	Bichu Thirumala	Solo	
1981	Thrishna	"Shruthiyil Ninnyarum"	Shyam	Bichu Thirumala	Solo	
1981	Thrishna	"Theyyaattam Dhamanikalil"	Shyam	Bichu Thirumala	K. J. Yesudas	
1981	Swarnappakshikal	"Thaamarappoovilayaalum"	Raveendran	Mullanezhi	Solo	
1981	Kadathu	"Manjanaathi Kunnummel"	Shyam	Bichu Thirumala	Solo	
1981	Kadathu	"Premaragam Padivannoru"	Shyam	Bichu Thirumala	Solo	
1981	Kadathu	"Venillaacholayil"	Shyam	Bichu Thirumala	Unni Menon	
1981	Aarathi	"Kaumaara Swapnangal"	M. B. Sreenivasan	Sathyan Anthikkad	Solo	
1981	Thenum Vayambum	"Thenum Vayambum"	Raveendran	Bichu Thirumala	Solo	
1981	Hamsa Geetham	"Chanchala Noopura Thaalam"	Shyam	Bichu Thirumala	Solo	
1981	Hamsa Geetham	"Kannil Naanam"	Shyam	Sathyan Anthikkad	Solo	
1981	Hamsa Geetham	"Ee Swaram"	Shyam	Sathyan Anthikkad	Kalyani Menon	
1981	Itha Oru Dhikkari	"Ente Janmam Neeyeduthu"	A. T. Ummer	Poovachal Khader	K. J. Yesudas	
1981	Itha Oru Dhikkari	"Meghangal"	A. T. Ummer	Poovachal Khader	K. J. Yesudas	
1981	Visham	"En Nayanangal"	Raghu Kumar	Poovachal Khader	Solo	
1981	Visham	"Nirangal Ezhu Nirangal"	Raghu Kumar	Poovachal Khader	Vani Jairam	
1981	Visham	"Swapnam Kaanum Prayam"	Raghu Kumar	Poovachal Khader	Vani Jairam	
1981	Oothikachiya Ponnu	"Ee Raavil Ninte"	M. K. Arjunan	Poovachal Khader	Solo	
1981	Ammakkorumma	"Makane Vaa"	Shyam	Sreekumaran Thampi	Solo	
1981	Ammakkorumma	"Ormavacha Naal"	Shyam	Sreekumaran Thampi	K. J. Yesudas	
1981	Ahimsa	"Kaattu Tharattum"	A. T. Ummer	Bichu Thirumala	K. J. Yesudas	
1981	Ahimsa	"Sulthano"	A. T. Ummer	Bichu Thirumala	K. J. Yesudas	
1981	Ahimsa	"Jalasankhu Pushpam"	A. T. Ummer	Bichu Thirumala	Solo	
1982	Ilakkangal	"Aavani Raathingal"	M. B. Sreenivasan	Kavalam Narayana Panicker	Solo	
1982	Ilakkangal	"Saradha Neelambara"	M. B. Sreenivasan	Kavalam Narayana Panicker	Kavalam Sreekumar	
1982	Ilakkangal	"Aa Thintho Thinathintho"	M. B. Sreenivasan	Kavalam Narayana Panicker	Kavalam Sreekumar	
1982	Ilakkangal	"Thushaara Manigal"	M. B. Sreenivasan	Kavalam Narayana Panicker	Kaviyoor Ponnamma	
1982	Idiyum Minnalum	"Raama Rasam"	Shyam	Bichu Thirumala	Solo	
1982	Anthiveyilile Ponnu	"Allimalarkkavil"	Salil Chowdhary	O. N. V. Kurup	Solo	
1982	Shila	"Prema Raagam"	A. T. Ummer	Dr. Pavithran	Solo	
1982	Niram Marunna Nimishangal	"Nanma Niranjori"	Shyam	Bichu Thirumala	Solo	
1982	Niram Marunna Nimishangal	"Omanakal"	Shyam	Bichu Thirumala	Solo	
1982	Theeraatha Bandhangal	"Edi Enthedi Rajamme"	K. Raghavan	Poovachal Khader	Kanakambaran	
1982	Theeraatha Bandhangal	"Saayam Sandhya"	K. Raghavan	Poovachal Khader	Solo	
1982	Mattuvin Chattangale	"Ee Raavil Njaan"	Shankar Ganesh	Mankombu Gopalakrishnan	Solo	
1982	Mattuvin Chattangale	"Himabindu Haaram Choodi"	Shankar Ganesh	K. J. Yesudas		
1982	Bheeman	"Maanasamaniyara"	A. T. Ummer	K. G. Menon	Solo	
1982	Gaanam	"Aalaapanam"	V. Dakshinamoorthy	Sreekumaran Thampi	K. J. Yesudas	
1982	Gaanam	"Maanasa"	V. Dakshinamoorthy	Sreekumaran Thampi		
1982	Gaanam	"Sindhooraruna Vigraham"	V. Dakshinamoorthy	Sreekumaran Thampi		
1982	Ivan Oru Simham	"Kanmani Pookkaniyaayi"	A. T. Ummer	Poovachal Khader	Solo	
1982	Ivan Oru Simham	"Kanmani Pookaniyayi (sad)"	A. T. Ummer	Poovachal Khader	Solo	
1982	Dheera	"Melle Nee Melle Varu"	Raghu Kumar	Poovachal Khader	Satheesh Babu	
1982	Dheera	"Pongi Pongippaarum"	Raghu Kumar	Poovachal Khader	Solo	
1982	Ee Nadu	"Aakaasha Perunthachan"	Shyam	Yusufali Kechery	J. M. Raju	
1982	Ee Nadu	"Ambili Manavatti"	Shyam	Yusufali Kechery	K. J. Yesudas, P. Jayachandran, C. O. Anto, S. P. Sailaja, J. M. Raju	
1982	Ee Nadu	"Maanathe Kottarathil"	Shyam	Yusufali Kechery	Solo	
1982	Kilukilukkam	"Anjali Pushpaanjali"	Johnson	O. N. V. Kurup	Solo	
1982	Aranjaanam	"Neelamegha Maalakal"	K. J. Joy	P. Bhaskaran	K. J. Yesudas	
1982	Kayam	"Kaayalkkaryil Thanichu"	M. K. Arjunan	Poovachal Khader	Solo	
1982	Ithum Oru Jeevitham	"Maaranicheppile"	R. Somashekharan	Vellanad Narayanan	R. Somashekaran	
1982	Aayudham	"Mailaanchi"	A. T. Ummer	Sathyan Anthikkad	K. J. Yesudas	
1982	Chillu	"Oru Vattam Koodiyen"	M. B. Sreenivasan	O. N. V. Kurup	Solo	
1982	Saravarsham	"Then Pookkalil"	Shyam	Poovachal Khader	Unni Menon, Kausalya	
1982	Ponmudy	"Doore Neerunna"	Jithin Shyam	Balu Kiriyath	Solo	
1982	Marupacha	"Anuraagame Nin Veedhiyil"	A. T. Ummer	Poovachal Khader	K. J. Yesudas	
1982	Ithu Njangalude Katha	"Swarnamukile Swarnamukile"	Johnson	P. Bhaskaran	Solo	
1982	Aalolam	"Veene Veene"	Ilaiyaraaja	Kavalam Narayana Panicker	Solo	
1982	Enthino Pookunna Pookkal	"Neeranu Neeranu"	Shyam	Poovachal Khader	K. J. Yesudas	
1982	Olangal	"Thumbi Vaa"	Ilaiyaraaja	O. N. V. Kurup	Solo	
1982	Olangal	"Vezhaambal Kelum Venalkkudeeram"	Ilaiyaraaja	O. N. V. Kurup	K. J. Yesudas	
1982	Ina	"Kinaavinte Varambathu"	A. T. Ummer	Bichu Thirumala	K. J. Yesudas, Krishnachandran	
1982	Ina	"Poovirinjilla"	A. T. Ummer	Bichu Thirumala	P. Jayachandran	
1982	Aarambham	"Ayyayyo Ennarikilitha"	Shyam	Poovachal Khader	Solo	
1982	Aarambham	"Chelotha Puthumaaran"	A. T. Ummer	Poovachal Khader	K. J. Yesudas	
1982	John Jaffer Janardhanan	"Nirangal Nirayum"	Shyam	Sreekumaran Thampi	Solo	
1982	John Jaffer Janardhanan	"Poonthattam Pongumpol"	Shyam	Sreekumaran Thampi	Unni Menon	
1982	Aadharsam	"Jeevan Pathanju Pongum"	Shyam	Bichu Thirumala	K. J. Yesudas	
1982	Aadharsam	"Laharikal Nurayumee"	Shyam	Bichu Thirumala	Solo	
1982	Aadharsam	"Kannu Poothalle"	Shyam	Bichu Thirumala	Solo	
1982	Oru Vilippadakale	"Ellam Ormakal"	Jerry Amaldev	P. Bhaskaran	P. Jayachandran	
1982	Oru Vilippadakale	"Prakaasha Naalam"	Jerry Amaldev	P. Bhaskaran		
1982	Sree Ayyappanum Vavarum	"Nilaavenna Pole"	A. T. Ummer	Poovachal Khader	Solo	
1982	Kaattile Paattu	"Ambilikkombatthe Ponnoonjaalil"	K. Raghavan	Mullanezhi	Solo	
1982	Beedi Kunjamma	"Madanante Thuneeram"	A. T. Ummer	Poovachal Khader	Solo	
1982	Beedi Kunjamma	"Thotu Thotu"	A. T. Ummer	Poovachal Khader	Solo	
1982	Marmaram	"Angam Prathi Anangan"	M. S. Viswanathan	Kavalam Narayana Panicker	Unni Menon	
1982	Marmaram	"Karnaamritham Kannanu"	M. S. Viswanathan	Kavalam Narayana Panicker	Solo	
1982	Marmaram	"Om"	M. S. Viswanathan	Kavalam Narayana Panicker	Solo	
1982	Marmaram	"Vattathil Vattaaram"	M. S. Viswanathan	Kavalam Narayana Panicker	Solo	
1982	Uvvu	"Manjuthulliyude Kunju Kavililum"	M. B. Sreenivasan	O. N. V. Kurup	K. J. Yesudas	
1982	Uvvu	"Nilaavu Veenu Mayangi"	M. B. Sreenivasan	O. N. V. Kurup	Solo	
1982	Kakka	"Elalamaali"	K. V. Mahadevan	P. Bhaskaran	K. J. Yesudas	
1982	Kakka	"Manavaalan Paara"	K. V. Mahadevan	P. Bhaskaran		
1982	Aa Divasam	"Chithrashalabhame Vaa"	Shyam	Chunakkara Ramankutty	Solo	
1982	Aa Divasam	"Manikutty Chunakkutty"	Shyam	Chunakkara Ramankutty	K. J. Yesudas	
1982	Ente Mohangal Poovaninju	"Aashada Meghangal"	V. Dakshinamoorthy	Puthiyankam Murali	K. J. Yesudas	
1982	Ente Mohangal Poovaninju	"Chakkini Raja"	V. Dakshinamoorthy	Thyagaraja	M. Balamuralikrishna	
1982	Ente Mohangal Poovaninju	"Manasuloli Marmamunu"	V. Dakshinamoorthy	Thyagaraja	K. J. Yesudas	
1982	Ente Mohangal Poovaninju	"Manasuna Neekai Marugutho"	V. Dakshinamoorthy	Thyagaraja	M. Balamuralikrishna, K. J. Yesudas	
1982	Ente Mohangal Poovaninju	"Nananju Neriya Patturumal"	V. Dakshinamoorthy	Bichu Thirumala	K. J. Yesudas	
1982	Ente Mohangal Poovaninju	"Thamburu Thaane"	V. Dakshinamoorthy	Bichu Thirumala	Solo	
1982	Sindoora Sandhyakku Mounam	"Aakashagangayil Varnangalaal"	Shyam	Bichu Thirumala	Krishnachandran	
1982	Sindoora Sandhyakku Mounam	"Aakashagangayil Varnangalaal"	Shyam	Bichu Thirumala	Solo	
1982	Sindoora Sandhyakku Mounam	"Kelilolam Thooval"	Shyam	Bichu Thirumala	K. J. Yesudas	
1982	Sindoora Sandhyakku Mounam	"Shaaleenayaam Saralprasaadame"	Shyam	Bichu Thirumala	K. J. Yesudas	
1982	Sindoora Sandhyakku Mounam	"Leelarangam"	Shyam	Bichu Thirumala	P. Jayachandran	
1982	Velicham Vitharunna Penkutty	"Raaga Sandhya Manjala"	Shyam	Mankombu Gopalakrishnan	K. J. Yesudas	
1982	Chiriyo Chiri	"Kokkaamandi"	Raveendran	Bichu Thirumala	K. J. Yesudas	
1982	Anuraagakkodathi	"Thennithenni"	A. T. Ummer	Sathyan Anthikkad	Solo	
1982	Innalenkil Nale	"Karalithiletho Kilipaadi"	Shyam	Yusufali Kechery	K. J. Yesudas	
1982	Theeram Thedunna Thira	"Kanninnte Karppooram"	Shyam	Kozhissery Balaraman	Solo	
1982	Theeram Thedunna Thira	"Nee Varille"	Shyam	Kozhissery Balaraman	Solo	
1982	Theeram Thedunna Thira	"Sundaramaam Kanmunayal"	Shyam	P. Bhaskaran	Solo	
1983	Mazha Nilaavu	"Paathiraakaattu Vannu"	Raveendran	Chunakkara Ramankutty	Solo	
1983	Mazha Nilaavu	"Raavil Raaga Nilaavil"	Raveendran	Poovachal Khader	Solo	
1983	Mazha Nilaavu	"Virinjittum Viriyatha"	Raveendran	Poovachal Khader	Kausalya	
1983	Pourasham	"Iniyum Ithal Choodi"	A. T. Ummer	Vellanad Narayanan	K. J. Yesudas	
1983	Hello Madras Girl	"Kandaal Oru Poovu"	Gangai Amaran	Poovachal Khader	Solo	
1983	Justice Raja	"Janmam Thorum"	Gangai Amaran	Poovachal Khader	K. J. Yesudas	
1983	Justice Raja	"Mungaakkadal Muthum"	Gangai Amaran	Poovachal Khader	K. J. Yesudas	
1983	Sandhyakku Virinja Poovu	"Manjum Kulirum"	Ilaiyaraaja	O. N. V. Kurup	Krishnachandran	
1983	Himam	"Gomedakam"	Shyam	Bichu Thirumala	K. J. Yesudas	
1983	Himam	"Gomedakam (extended)"	Shyam	Bichu Thirumala	S. P. Balasubrahmanyam, Jolly Abraham	
1983	Himam	"Lilli Pookkalaadum"	Shyam	Bichu Thirumala	P. Jayachandran	
1983	Himam	"Raagavathi Priya"	Shyam	Mankombu Gopalakrishnan	Unni Menon	
1983	Pallamkuzhi	"Ethu Naattilaano"	K. Raghavan	Ettamanoor Sreekumar	K. J. Yesudas	
1983	Kuyiline Thedi	"Mullavallikkudilil"	Shyam	Chunakkara Ramankutty	Solo	
1983	Kuyiline Thedi	"Mullavallikkudilil (duet)"	Shyam	Chunakkara Ramankutty	K. J. Yesudas	
1983	Thaalam Thettiya Tharattu	"Hemantha Geetham"	Raveendran	R. K. Damodaran	K. J. Yesudas	
1983	Naseema	"Ennittum Neeyenne Arinjillallo"	Johnson	P. Bhaskaran	Solo	
1983	Rachana	"Kaalamayoorame"	M. B. Sreenivasan	Mullanezhi	Solo	
1983	Rachana	"Onnaanam Kaattile"	M. B. Sreenivasan	Mullanezhi	Unni Menon	
1983	Oru Swakaryam	"Aalolam Thaalolam"	M. B. Sreenivasan	M. D. Rajendran	Solo	
1983	Mansoru Maha Samudram	"Thudakkam"	M. K. Arjunan	Kanam E. J.	Solo	
1983	Thaavalam	"Arimullaykkum Chiri Vannu"	Johnson	Poovachal Khader	Solo	
1983	Thaavalam	"Gandham Purushagandham"	Johnson	Poovachal Khader	Solo	
1983	Kadamba	"Aandi Vannaandi Vannu"	K. Raghavan	Bichu Thirumala	Solo	
1983	Karyam Nissaram	"Konchi Ninna Panchamiyo"	Kannur Rajan	Konniyoor Bhas	Solo	
1983	Karyam Nissaram	"Thaalam Shruthilaya Thaalam"	Kannur Rajan	Konniyoor Bhas	K. J. Yesudas	
1983	Aa Raathri	"Ee Neelima Than"	Ilaiyaraaja	Poovachal Khader	K. J. Yesudas	
1983	Aa Raathri	"Kiliye Kiliye"	Ilaiyaraaja	Poovachal Khader	Solo	
1983	America America	"Daffodils Veendum Viriyunnu"	Shyam	Bichu Thirumala	K. J. Yesudas	
1983	America America	"Therirangiyithile Varoo"	Shyam	Bichu Thirumala	P. Jayachandran	
1983	Visa	"Raathriyil Pookkunna"	Jithin Shyam	Bichu Thirumala	Solo	
1983	Aadhipathyam	"Deepangal Engumengum"	Shyam	Sreekumaran Thampi	K. J. Yesudas	
1983	Aadhipathyam	"Paradesakkaranu"	Shyam	Sreekumaran Thampi	Unni Menon, Jolly Abraham	
1983	Kathi	"Paathiraakaattil"	M. B. Sreenivasan	O. N. V. Kurup	Solo	
1983	Ente Katha	"Allallalla Killikkilli"	A. T. Ummer	Poovachal Khader	Solo	
1983	Oru Mukham Pala Mukham	"Ente Udal Cherrnnu"	A. T. Ummer	Poovachal Khader	Solo	
1983	Oru Mukham Pala Mukham	"Ponnin Pushpangal"	A. T. Ummer	Poovachal Khader	Solo	
1983	Oru Mukham Pala Mukham	"Thoomanjin Thooval Veeshi"	A. T. Ummer	Poovachal Khader	K. J. Yesudas	
1983	Aashrayam	"Pirannaalillatha"	M. B. Sreenivasan	Poovachal Khader	K. J. Yesudas, Nedumudi Venu	
1983	Aashrayam	"Thaazhikakkudavumaay"	M. B. Sreenivasan	Poovachal Khader	K. J. Yesudas	
1983	Ee Vazhi Mathram	"Kanni Veyilu"	Shyam	Kallada Sasi	P. Jayachandran	
1983	Pinnilavu	"Nishaamanoree"	Ilaiyaraaja	Yusufali Kechery	K. J. Yesudas, P. Jayachandran	
1983	Pinnilavu	"Priyane Uyir Neeye"	Ilaiyaraaja	Yusufali Kechery	K. J. Yesudas	
1983	Aaroodam	"Kaathiripoo Kunjarippoovu"	Shyam	Kavalam Narayana Panicker	Solo	
1983	Nathi Muthal Nathi Vare	"Karalinnum Karalaay"	Raghu Kumar	Chowalloor Krishnankutty	Solo	
1983	Nathi Muthal Nathi Vare	"Maanatthum Haalu"	Raghu Kumar	Chowalloor Krishnankutty	K. J. Yesudas	
1983	Mandanmmar Londonil	"Mounamohangal Niram Tharum"	Shyam	Sathyan Anthikkad	Solo	
1983	Oomakkuyil	"Kaatte Kaatte"	Ilaiyaraaja	O. N. V. Kurup	P. Jayachandran, Krishnachandran	
1983	Oomakkuyil	"Ormakalaay Koode Varoo"	Ilaiyaraaja	O. N. V. Kurup	K. J. Yesudas	
1983	Oomakkuyil	"Thaazhampoothaali Nin"	Ilaiyaraaja	O. N. V. Kurup	Solo	
1983	Oomakkuyil	"Thaazhampoothaali Nin (sad)"	Ilaiyaraaja	O. N. V. Kurup	Solo	
1983	Oomakkuyil	"Thaazhampoothaali Nin (bit)"	Ilaiyaraaja	O. N. V. Kurup	Solo	
1983	Iniyengilum	"Kunkuma Sooryan"	Shyam	Yusufali Kechery	K. J. Yesudas	
1983	Iniyengilum	"Mouna Raagam"	Shyam	Yusufali Kechery	K. J. Yesudas	
1983	Iniyengilum	"Swarga Vaathil Thurannu"	Shyam	Yusufali Kechery	P. Jayachandran, Vani Jairam, Unni Menon, Krishnachandran, Kausalya, J. M. Raju	
1983	Swapnalokam	"Paaduvan Marannu"	Jerry Amaldev	O. N. V. Kurup	Solo	
1983	Sandhya Mayangum Neram	"Olangalilulayum"	Shyam	O. N. V. Kurup	Vani Jairam, Krishnachandran, C. O. Anto	
1983	Sandhya Mayangum Neram	"Varu Nee"	Shyam	O. N. V. Kurup	Solo	
1983	Paalam	"Orajnjaatha Pushpam Vidarnnu"	A. T. Ummer	Poovachal Khader	Krishnachandran	
1983	Oomana Thinkal	"Amma Ammamma"	M. B. Sreenivasan	Bichu Thirumala	Solo	
1983	Oomana Thinkal	"Olanjaalikkiliyude"	M. B. Sreenivasan	Bichu Thirumala	Solo	
1983	Sandhya Vandanam	"Thenilanji"	L. P. R. Varma	Vayalar Ramavarma	Solo	
1983	Kingini Kombu	"Pon Kinaavinu"	Raveendran	Mullanezhi	K. P. Brahmanandan	
1983	Kingini Kombu	"Poonalivin Alakalil"	Raveendran	Mullanezhi	Solo	
1983	Saagaram Santham	"Elam Pookkum Kaalam Vannu"	M. B. Sreenivasan	O. N. V. Kurup	P. Jayachandran	
1983	Engane Nee Marakkum	"Romeo Juliet"	Shyam	Chunakkara Ramankutty	Krishnachandran	
1983	Koodevide	"Aadi Vaa Katte"	Johnson	O. N. V. Kurup	Solo	
1983	Koodevide	"Ponnurukum Pookkaalam"	Johnson	O. N. V. Kurup	Solo	
1983	Parasparam	"Kilivaathilinarikil"	M. B. Sreenivasan	O. N. V. Kurup	K. J. Yesudas	
1983	Parasparam	"Nirangal Than Nritham"	M. B. Sreenivasan	O. N. V. Kurup	Solo	
1983	Parasparam	"Nirangal Than (sad)"	M. B. Sreenivasan	O. N. V. Kurup	Solo	
1983	Kaikeyi	"Jhil Jhil Jhilenu"	M. S. Viswanathan	Poovachal Khader	Krishnachandran	
1983	Ee Yugam	"Kanna Nin Kilikkonchal"	A. T. Ummer	Poovachal Khader	Solo	
1983	Ee Yugam	"Maanathin Manimuttathu"	A. T. Ummer	Poovachal Khader	Jolly Abraham	
1983	Asthram	"Kingini Ponmani Manjeeram"	Shyam	Poovachal Khader	Solo	
1983	Aattakalasam	"Njaan Rajanithan Kusumam"	Raveendran	Poovachal Khader	Solo	
1983	Maniyara	"Viphalam"	A. T. Ummer	P. Bhaskaran	Solo	
1983	Prasnam Gurutharam	"Leela Thilakam"	Raveendran	Bichu Thirumala	K. J. Yesudas	
1983	Ponnethooval	"Kanna Guruvayoorappa"	Raghu Kumar	Poovachal Khader	Solo	
1983	Kattathe Kilikkoodu	"Gopike Nin Viral"	Johnson	Kavalam Narayana Panicker	Solo	
1983	Changatham	"Gaagultha Malayil Ninnum"	Raveendran	Puthiyankam Murali	K. J. Yesudas	
1983	Changatham	"Pradhamaraavin"	Raveendran	Puthiyankam Murali	Solo	
1983	Changatham	"Vishama Vrithathil"	Raveendran	Puthiyankam Murali	Solo	
1983	Aadyathe Anuraagam	"Manjakkanikkonna"	Raveendran	Madhu Alappuzha	Solo	
1983	Sesham Kazhchayil	"Moham Kondu Njaan"	Johnson	Konniyoor Bhas	Solo	
1983	Sesham Kazhchayil	"Kannukalil Pooviriyum"	Johnson	Konniyoor Bhas	K. J. Yesudas	
1983	Bandham	"Kanni Thennal Pole"	Shyam	Poovachal Khader	K. J. Yesudas	
1983	Bandham	"Munnil Njaninmeleri"	Shyam	Poovachal Khader	Mohan Sharma	
1983	Asuran	"Varoo Sakhi"	A. T. Ummer	Bichu Thirumala	K. J. Yesudas	
1983	Asuran	"Vrindavana Kanna"	A. T. Ummer	Bichu Thirumala	K. J. Yesudas	
1983	Asuran	"Mummy Daddy"	A. T. Ummer	Bichu Thirumala	Solo	
1983	Sagara Sangamam	"Bala Kanakamaya"	Ilaiyaraaja	Thyagaraja	Solo	
1983	Sagara Sangamam	"Om Namah Shivaya"	Ilaiyaraaja	Sreekumaran Thampi	Solo	
1983	Sagara Sangamam	"Mounam Polum Madhuram"	Ilaiyaraaja	Sreekumaran Thampi	P. Jayachandran	
1984	Inakkily	"Chollam Nin Kaathil"	Shyam	Poovachal Khader	K. J. Yesudas	
1984	Inakkily	"Ente Manomayee"	Shyam	Poovachal Khader	K. J. Yesudas	
1984	Inakkily	"Kannippunnarakkiliye"	Shyam	Poovachal Khader	K. J. Yesudas	
1984	Inakkily	"Vinnin Vellippookkal"	Shyam	Poovachal Khader	K. J. Yesudas	
1984	Ente Upasana	"Sundarippoovinu Naanam"	Johnson	Poovachal Khader	Solo	
1984	Ente Upasana	"Sundarippovinu Naanam (sad)"	Johnson	Poovachal Khader	Solo	
1984	Ente Kalithozhan	"Arayannappida"	Shyam	Chunakkara Ramankutty	K. J. Yesudas	
1984	Ente Kalithozhan	"O Malaraay Madhuvaay"	Shyam	Chunakkara Ramankutty	Solo	
1984	Oru Sumangaliyude Katha	"Chilanke"	Shyam	P. Bhaskaran	Solo	
1984	Radhayude Kamukan	"Punchiri Thookumen"	A. T. Ummer	Kaniyapuram Ramachandran	Solo	
1984	Kodathy	"Nilaavin Poykayil"	Shyam	Poovachal Khader	K. J. Yesudas	
1984	Veruthe Oru Pinakkam	"Ragavum Thalavum"	Raveendran	Sathyan Anthikkad	K. J. Yesudas	
1984	Unaroo	"Deepame"	Ilaiyaraaja	Yusufali Kechery	C. O. Anto, Krishnachandran	
1984	Unaroo	"Theeram Thedi Olam Paadi"	Ilaiyaraaja	Yusufali Kechery	Solo	
1984	Vepraalam	"Varoo Arike Arike"	K. V. Mahadevan	Balu Kiriyath	Solo	
1984	Nethavu	"Madhuramam Lahariyil"	A. T. Ummer	O. N. V. Kurup	K. J. Yesudas	
1984	Veendum Chalikkunna Chakram	"Devi Nee Prabhathamaay"	Shyam	Chunakkara Ramankutty	K. J. Yesudas	
1984	Parannu Parannu Parannu	"Karimizhikkuruvikal"	Johnson	O. N. V. Kurup	K. J. Yesudas	
1984	Parannu Parannu Parannu	"Thaalamaay Varoo"	Johnson	O. N. V. Kurup	Solo	
1984	Aalkoottathil Thaniye	"Allimalar"	Shyam	Kavalam Narayana Panicker	Solo	
1984	Aksharangal	"Alasathaa Vilasitham"	Shyam	O. N. V. Kurup	Unni Menon	
1984	Aksharangal	"Karutha Thonikkaara"	Shyam	O. N. V. Kurup	P. Jayachandran	
1984	Velichamillatha Veedhi	"Mangalyaswapnangale"	K. P. Udayabhanu	Vellanad Narayanan	Solo	
1984	Theere Pratheekshikkathe	"Ethu Raagam"	A. T. Ummer	Poovachal Khader	Solo	
1984	Athirathram	"Kanikal"	M. S. Viswanathan	Kavalam Narayana Panicker	K. J. Yesudas	
1984	Umaanilayam	"Madhumazhapozhiyum"	Shyam	Poovachal Khader	Unni Menon	
1984	Umaanilayam	"Thottunokkiyal"	Shyam	Poovachal Khader	P. Jayachandran	
1984	Chakkarayumma	"Thalarunnu Oridam Tharoo"	Shyam	Poovachal Khader	Solo	
1984	April 18	"Aadivaroo Azhake"	A. T. Ummer	Bichu Thirumala	K. J. Yesudas	
1984	April 18	"Kalindee Theeram"	A. T. Ummer	Bichu Thirumala	K. J. Yesudas	
1984	Onnum Mindatha Bharya	"Ruhiyante"	Raghu Kumar	Balu Kiriyath	Jolly Abraham, Satheesh Babu	
1984	Onnum Mindatha Bharya	"Vasantham Vannu"	Raghu Kumar	Balu Kiriyath	Solo	
1984	Piriyilla Naam	"Kaikalkottipaaduka"	K. V. Mahadevan	Poovachal Khader	Unni Menon, Krishnachandran	
1984	Piriyilla Naam	"Kasthoorimaninte Thozhi"	K. V. Mahadevan	Poovachal Khader	K. J. Yesudas	
1984	Piriyilla Naam	"Munnazhi Mutthumaay"	K. V. Mahadevan	Poovachal Khader	K. J. Yesudas	
1984	Piriyilla Naam	"Oru Kudam Kulirum"	K. V. Mahadevan	Poovachal Khader	Solo	
1984	NH 47	"Punnarappoomanimaaran"	Shyam	Poovachal Khader	Solo	
1984	Kilikkonjal	"Peyyathe Poya Meghame"	Darsan Raman	Bichu Thirumala	Solo	
1984	Kilikkonjal	"Raathrikku Neelam Poraa"	Darsan Raman	Bichu Thirumala	Chandran	
1984	Paavam Poornima	"Pularvanappoonthoppil"	Raghu Kumar	Balu Kiriyath	Solo	
1984	Lakshmana Rekha	"Enno Engengo"	A. T. Ummer	Bichu Thirumala	Solo	
1984	Thathamme Poocha Poocha	"Thathamme Poocha Poocha"	M. B. Sreenivasan	Balu Kiriyath	Kalyani Menon	
1984	Manasse Ninakku Mangalam	"Chiriyil Njaan"	Raveendran	Poovachal Khader	K. J. Yesudas	
1984	Manasse Ninakku Mangalam	"Daaham Theera Daaham"	Raveendran	Poovachal Khader		
1984	Koottinilamkili	"Kilukkaam Petti"	Shyam	Chunakkara Ramankutty	P. Jayachandran	
1984	Unni Vanna Divasam	"Chithram Oru Chithram"	A. T. Ummer	Devadas	K. J. Yesudas	
1984	Unni Vanna Divasam	"Varrnamaala"	A. T. Ummer	Devadas	Solo	
1984	Thacholi Thankappan	"Paadathe Njarinum"	Raveendran	P. Bhaskaran	Solo	
1984	Thacholi Thankappan	"Thattathinullil"	Raveendran	P. Bhaskaran	Solo	
1984	Karimbu	"Maarathu Marukulla"	Shyam	Poovachal Khader	Unni Menon	
1984	Kanamarayathu	"Kasthurimaan Kurunne"	Shyam	Bichu Thirumala	Solo	
1984	Kanamarayathu	"Illiyilam Kili Chillimulam Kili"	Shyam	Bichu Thirumala	Solo	
1984	Ithiri Poove Chuvannapoove	"Omana Thinkal Kidavo"	Raveendran	Kavalam Narayana Panicker	Solo	
1984	Paavam Krooran	"Thaalangal Unarnnidum"	A. T. Ummer	Poovachal Khader	Solo	
1984	My Dear Kuttichathan	"Aalippazham Perukkaan"	Ilaiyaraaja	Bichu Thirumala	S. P. Sailaja	
1984	Anthichuvappu	"Vellichilankayaninju Vaadee"	A. T. Ummer	Poovachal Khader	Solo	
1984	Muthodu Muthu	"Kannil Nee Thenmalaraay"	Shyam	Chunakkara Ramankutty	K. J. Yesudas	
1984	Sreekrishna Parunthu	"Mothirakkai Viralukalaal"	K. Raghavan	P. Bhaskaran	Solo	
1984	Ivide Ingane	"Arayannatheril"	Shyam	Poovachal Khader	K. J. Yesudas	
1984	Ivide Ingane	"Thadiya Podiya"	Shyam	Poovachal Khader	Solo	
1984	Shabadham	"Yaamam Kuliru Peyyum"	Raveendran	Devadas	Solo	
1984	Sandyakkenthinu Sindhooram	"Chanthamerina Poovilum"	Shyam	Kavalam Narayana Panicker	Solo	
1984	Sandyakkenthinu Sindhooram	"Manasasarovaram"	Shyam	Kavalam Narayana Panicker	Solo	
1984	Sandyakkenthinu Sindhooram	"Manassin Arohanam"	Shyam	Kavalam Narayana Panicker	Solo	
1984	Sandyakkenthinu Sindhooram	"Marubhoomi Chodichu"	Shyam	Kavalam Narayana Panicker	Solo	
1984	Sandyakkenthinu Sindhooram	"Ponnanthiyil"	Shyam	Kavalam Narayana Panicker	K. J. Yesudas	
1984	Minimol Vathicanil	"Kunjikannukal Thuranna"	M. S. Viswanathan	Poovachal Khader	Solo	
1984	Minimol Vathicanil	"Ninmizhiyum Enmizhiyum"	M. S. Viswanathan	Poovachal Khader	K. J. Yesudas	
1984	Swantham Sharika	"Aa Viral Nulliyal"	Kannur Rajan	P. Bhaskaran	Solo	
1984	Swantham Sharika	"Aadya Chumbanathil"	Kannur Rajan	P. Bhaskaran	K. J. Yesudas	
1984	Enganeyundashaane	"Pinangunnuvo"	Raveendran	Balu Kiriyath	Solo	
1984	Enganeyundashaane	"Sopana Gaayikaye"	Raveendran	Balu Kiriyath	K. J. Yesudas, Raveendran	
1984	Onnanu Nammal	"Kalkkandam Chundil"	Ilaiyaraaja	Bichu Thirumala	K. J. Yesudas	
1984	Onnanu Nammal	"Vaalittezhuthiya"	Ilaiyaraaja	Bichu Thirumala	K. J. Yesudas	
1984	Vasantholsavam	"Hey Kema Ee Nammalodu"	Ilaiyaraaja	Poovachal Khader	Solo	
1984	Vasantholsavam	"Chumma Ninneedalle"	Ilaiyaraaja	Poovachal Khader	P. Jayachandran	
1984	Vasantholsavam	"Varunnu Varunne Ini"	Ilaiyaraaja	Poovachal Khader	S. P. Balasubrahmanyam	
1984	Thennal Thedunna Poovu	"Nin Neela Nayanangalil"	M. S. Viswanathan	Mankombu Gopalakrishnan	K. J. Yesudas	
1985	Chillu Kottaram	"Njaan Choodilaada"	A. T. Ummer	Poovachal Khader	Solo	
1985	Chillu Kottaram	"Valakilukkam Thalakilukkam"	A. T. Ummer	Poovachal Khader	Solo	
1985	Avidathe Pole Ivideyum	"Deepam"	M. K. Arjunan	P. Bhaskaran	Solo	
1985	Ee Thanalil Ithiri Nerum	"Aa Ramya Sreerangame"	Shyam	Poovachal Khader	Solo	
1985	Ee Thanalil Ithiri Nerum	"Mummy Mummy"	Shyam	Poovachal Khader	Solo	
1985	Ee Thanalil Ithiri Nerum	"Maanam Mannil"	Shyam	Poovachal Khader	K. J. Yesudas	
1985	Ee Thanalil Ithiri Nerum	"Poovaninju Maanasam"	Shyam	Poovachal Khader	K. J. Yesudas	
1985	Aazhi	"Alliyilam Poo"	Raj Kamal	Bichu Thirumala	K. J. Yesudas	
1985	Aazhi	"Ezhu Paalam Kadannu"	Raj Kamal	Bichu Thirumala	K. P. Brahmanandan	
1985	Pacha Velicham	"Swararagamaay"	Shyam	Chunakkara Ramankutty	Solo	
1985	Pacha Velicham	"Swararagamaay (sad)"	Shyam	Chunakkara Ramankutty	Solo	
1985	Nayakan	"Suhaasam"	A. T. Ummer	Balu Kiriyath	Solo	
1985	Ozhivukaalam	"Saayanthanam Nizhalveeshiyilla"	Johnson	K. Jayakumar	K. J. Yesudas	
1985	Jeevante Jeevan	"En Karalil"	Shyam	Poovachal Khader	K. J. Yesudas	
1985	Jeevante Jeevan	"Kandaalumen Priyane"	Shyam	Poovachal Khader	Solo	
1985	Oru Sandesam Koodi	"Oraayiram"	Shyam	R. K. Damodaran	P. Jayachandran	
1985	Onathumbikkoru Oonjaal	"Onnanam Kunnirangi Vaavaaa"	A. T. Ummer	Poovachal Khader	Solo	
1985	Nerariyum Nerathu	"Orupaadu Swapnangal"	Johnson	Ezhacheri Ramachandran	K. J. Yesudas	
1985	Nerariyum Nerathu	"Premakala Devathamarude"	Johnson	Ezhacheri Ramachandran	Solo	
1985	Manya Mahajanangale	"Pathinezhaam Vayassinte"	Shyam	Poovachal Khader	Solo	
1985	Bindhu	"Bhaaratha Naadin"	Peter, Reuben	Bharanikkavu Sivakumar	Solo	
1985	Bindhu	"Chaithanyame"	Peter, Reuben	Bharanikkavu Sivakumar	Solo	
1985	Bindhu	"Poovilikal"	Peter, Reuben	Bharanikkavu Sivakumar	Solo	
1985	Bindhu	"Kadalippoovinte"	Peter, Reuben	Bharanikkavu Sivakumar	P. Jayachandran	
1985	Ayanam	"Swargasthanaya Punyapithave"	M. B. Sreenivasan	Mullanezhi	Unni Menon	
1985	Akkacheyude Kunjuvava	"Sundarikutty Chirikkunna"	Johnson	Poovachal Khader	Solo	
1985	Akkacheyude Kunjuvava	"Thaalam Thaalolam"	Johnson	Poovachal Khader	Solo	
1985	Iniyum Kadha Thudarum	"Oru Chirithan"	Shyam	Poovachal Khader	Solo	
1985	Yathra	"Yamune Ninnude"	Ilaiyaraaja	O. N. V. Kurup	Solo	
1985	Pournami Raavil 3D	"Paala Poothu"	Shankar Ganesh	P. Bhaskaran	Solo	
1985	Kaiyum Thalayum Purathidaruthe	"Ambalappoove Nin"	Raveendran	Poovachal Khader	Solo	
1985	Kaattu Rani	"Aanandameko Anuragameko"	Rajan Nagendra	Anthikkad Mani	K. J. Yesudas	
1985	Kaattu Rani	"Kaalidarunnu"	Rajan Nagendra	Anthikkad Mani	K. J. Yesudas	
1985	Kaattu Rani	"Omkaari"	Rajan Nagendra	Anthikkad Mani	Solo	
1986	Bhagavan	"Mailanchikkaram"	M. S. Viswanathan	Poovachal Khader	Solo	
1986	Nilaavinte Naattil	"Aattakkuruvi"	Shyam	Kavalam Narayana Panicker	Solo	
1986	Kunjattakilikal	"Ee Ponnu Poottha"	A. J. Joseph	K. Jayakumar	Solo	
1986	Poomukhappadiyil Ninneyum Kaathu	"Konche Karayalle"	Ilaiyaraaja	Bichu Thirumala	K. J. Yesudas	
1986	Poomukhappadiyil Ninneyum Kaathu	"Poonkaattinodum"	Ilaiyaraaja	Bichu Thirumala	K. J. Yesudas	
1986	Oru Manju Thulli Pole	"Kaalathin Kaliyodam"	Raveendran	Vellanad Narayanan	Solo	
1986	Meenamasathile Sooryan	"Adaykkaakkuruvikal"	M. B. Sreenivasan	Ezhacheri Ramachandran	Solo	
1986	Bharya Oru Manthri	"Vaathsyayante Raathrikal"	Kannur Rajan	Bichu Thirumala	Solo	
1986	Yuvajanotsavam	"Aa Mukham Kanda Naal"	Raveendran	Sreekumaran Thampi	Satheesh Babu	
1986	Thidambu	"Ente Raaga"	Johnson	Ravi Vilangan	Solo	
1986	Thidambu	"Malayaja Maamalayil"	Johnson	Ravi Vilangan	Solo	
1986	Aayiram Kannukal	"Athyunnathangalil"	Raghu Kumar	Shibu Chakravarthy	Solo	
1986	Aayiram Kannukal	"Ee Kulir Nisheedhiniyil"	Raghu Kumar	Shibu Chakravarthy	Unni Menon	
1986	Chithrashalabhangal	"Nimmi Darling"	A. T. Ummer	Poovachal Khader	K. J. Yesudas	
1986	Moonnu Masangalku Mumbu	"Poyakaalam Pooviricha"	Shyam	Poovachal Khader	Solo	
1986	Surabhi Yaamangal	"Swapnathil Polum"	Kannur Rajan	Pappanamkodu Lakshmanan	Manoharan	
1986	Nimishangal	"Mullapperiyarinu"	M. B. Sreenivasan	P. Bhaskaran	Solo	
1986	Ninnistham Ennishtam	"Ilam Manjin Kulirumayoru"	Kannur Rajan	Mankombu Gopalakrishnan	K. J. Yesudas	
1986	Veendum	"Thenoorum Malar Pootha"	Ouseppachan	Shibu Chakravarthy	K. J. Yesudas	
1986	Shobhraj	"Kannalle Kallan"	L. Vaidyanathan	Cheramangalam	Solo	
1986	Viswasichalum Illenkilum	"Viswasichalum"	Kannur Rajan	T. K. Layan	Solo	
1986	Priyamvadakkoru Pranayageethom	"Amma Achanu"	M. S. Viswanathan	Poovachal Khader	Solo	
1987	Amme Bhagavathi	"Aayiram Ithalulla"	M. S. Viswanathan	Sreekumaran Thampi	K. J. Yesudas	
1987	Neela Kurinji Poothappol	"Mele Nandanam Poothe"	Jerry Amaldev	Kavalam Narayana Panicker	Krishnachandran	
1987	Kurukkan Rajavayi	"Thaarunyathin Vaniyil"	A. T. Ummer	Poovachal Khader	Solo	
1987	Kaiyethum Doorathu	"Vellimaan Kalledukkukale"	M. S. Viswanathan	Kavalam Narayana Panicker	Solo	
1987	Kaiyethum Doorathu	"Poovamban Paadi"	M. S. Viswanathan	Kavalam Narayana Panicker	P. Jayachandran	
1987	Avalude Katha	"Kanmani Neeyurangoo"	A. T. Ummer	Poovachal Khader	Solo	
1987	Swathi Thirunal	"Mamava Sada Varade"	M. B. Sreenivasan	Swathi Thirunal	Solo	
1987	Swathi Thirunal	"Omanathinkal Kidavo"	M. B. Sreenivasan	Irayimman Thampi	Solo	
1988	Rahasyam Parama Rahasyam	"Pularunnu Bhoomiyil"	S. P. Venkatesh	Poovachal Khader	Solo	
1988	Isabella	"Thalir Munthiri"	Johnson	O. N. V. Kurup	Solo	
1988	Kanana Sundari	"Prayamayya"	Jerry Amaldev	Devadas	Solo	
1988	Alpha	"Shankhuchakram"	Jaya Vijaya	N. S. Kumar	Solo	
1988	Sangeetha Sangamam	"Sree Saradha"	K. V. Mahadevan	Mankombu Gopalakrishnan	Solo	
1989	Najangalude Kochu Doctor	"Mekhangal"	Darsan Raman	S. Ramesan Nair	Alice	
1989	Aazhikkoru Muthu	"Ekaanthathaye Pulki"	M. G. Radhakrishnan	Chunakkara Ramankutty	Solo	
1989	Aazhikkoru Muthu	"Rathipathiyaay"	M. G. Radhakrishnan	Chunakkara Ramankutty	M. G. Sreekumar	
1989	Monchulla Raavu	"Monchulla"	A. T. Ummer	Poovachal Khader	Solo	
1989	Pandu Pandoru Desathu	"Poovudayaadakal"	Johnson	O. N. V. Kurup	Solo	

== After 1990s ==
Year	Film	Song	Music director	Writer	Co-singer	Ref
1990	Iyer the Great	"Chalanam Jwalanam"	M. S. Viswanathan	Poovachal Khader	Solo	
1990	Iyer the Great	"Chalanam Jwalanam (duet)"	M. S. Viswanathan	Poovachal Khader	P. Jayachandran	
1990	Kuruppinte Kanakku Pustakom	"Theeyum Kaattum Pole"	Balachandra Menon	S. Ramesan Nair	Unni Menon	
1990	Geethanjali	"Om Namaha"	Ilaiyaraaja	Anthikkad Mani	S. P. Balasubrahmanyam	
1992	Johnnie Walker	"Chemmaanappoomancham"	S. P. Venkatesh	Gireesh Puthenchery	Solo	
1992	Kallan Kappalil Thanne	"Kaanaakkombil Pookkum"	Mohan Sithara	R. K. Damodaran	Solo	
1992	Pappayude Swantham Appoos	"En Poove"	Ilaiyaraaja	Bichu Thirumala	Solo	
1992	Pappayude Swantham Appoos	"Olathumbathirunnooyalaadum"	Ilaiyaraaja	Bichu Thirumala	Solo	
1992	Pappayude Swantham Appoos	"En Poove (sad)"	Ilaiyaraaja	Bichu Thirumala	Solo	
1992	Ennodu Ishtam Koodamo	"Hey Nilaakkili"	S. P. Venkatesh	Kaithapram	Solo	
1993	Aalavattam	"Naamavum Roopavum"	Mohan Sithara	Kaithapram	Solo	
1993	Kavadiyattam	"Kaattu Thulli"	Mohan Sithara	O. N. V. Kurup	K. J. Yesudas	
1993	Maya Mayooram	"Kaikkudanna Niraye"	Raghu Kumar	Gireesh Puthenchery	K. J. Yesudas	
1993	Samagamam	"Vaazhthidunnitha"	Johnson	O. N. V. Kurup	Solo	
1993	Samagamam	"Paadippookkam"	Johnson	O. N. V. Kurup	Johnson	
1993	Samagamam	"Vaazhthidunnitha (bit)"	Johnson	O. N. V. Kurup	C. O. Anto	
1993	Yaadhavam	"Anthikkattin Kayyil"	Raghu Kumar	Gireesh Puthenchery	Solo	
1993	Bhaasuram	"Chippi Poo"	S. P. Venkatesh	Bichu Thirumala	K. J. Yesudas	
1993	Paamaram	"Thulasee Sandhyayeriyum Neram"	Johnson	Kaithapram	Solo	
1993	Paamaram	"Naadodi Koothaadan Vaa"	Johnson	Kaithapram	Johnson	
1994	Pidakkozhi Koovunna Noottandu	"Ezhaazhi Neenthi"	S. P. Venkatesh	Kavalam Narayana Panicker	S. P. Balasubrahmanyam	
1994	Ladies Only	"Veettil Ninne"	Ilaiyaraaja	Mankombu Gopalakrishnan	Solo	
1994	Ladies Only	"Thattanam Muttile"	Ilaiyaraaja	Mankombu Gopalakrishnan	Solo	
1994	Ladies Only	"Cricket Ball Onnu"	Ilaiyaraaja	Mankombu Gopalakrishnan	M. G. Sreekumar	
1994	Nandini Oppol	"Mailaanchi"	Ouseppachan	O. N. V. Kurup	Solo	
1995	Simhavalan Menon	"Ee Poonthoovalum"	S. P. Venkatesh	Gireesh Puthenchery	Solo	
1995	Aadyathe Kanmani	"Akale Akale" (resung)	M. S. Baburaj	Sreekumaran Thampi	K. J. Yesudas	
1995	No. 1 Snehatheeram Bangalore North	"Mele Mele Maanam"	Jerry Amaldev	Gireesh Puthenchery	Solo	
1995	Minnaminuginum Minnukettu	"Thankathamburuvo"	S. P. Venkatesh	Gireesh Puthenchery	Solo	
1995	Mazhayethum Munpe	"Ennittum Nee Paadeelallo"	Raveendran	Kaithapram	Solo	
1995	Special Squad	"Manjaniyum"	Mohan Sithara	Mudavanmugal Vasantha Kumari	Solo	
1995	Hai Sundary	"Priyathama Ithu Manassilunarum"	Ilaiyaraaja	Mankombu Gopalakrishnan	M. G. Sreekumar	
1995	"Imayo Then Navamalar"		Ilaiyaraaja	Mankombu Gopalakrishnan	M. G. Sreekumar	
1996	April 19	"Sharappoli Maala Chaarthi"	Raveendran	S. Ramesan Nair	K. J. Yesudas	
1996	"Mazha Peythal"		Raveendran	S. Ramesan Nair	K. J. Yesudas	
1996	"Devike Nin Meyyil"		Raveendran	S. Ramesan Nair	K. J. Yesudas	
1996	Sangamasandhya	"Meyurungu"	Chandrabose	Poovachal Khader	Solo	
1996	"Thanka Thinkal"		Chandrabose	Poovachal Khader	Solo	
1996	"Udayadri"		Chandrabose	Poovachal Khader	Solo	
1996	"Rajathi"	P. Jayachandran	Chandrabose	Poovachal Khader		
1997	Aattuvela	"Anjanakannezhuthi"	Raveendran	Gireesh Puthenchery	K. S. Chithra, M. G. Sreekumar	
1997	Ente Priyathamanu	"Lallalam Chollum Poonkkatte"	Albert Vijayan	Dr. Sadasivan	Solo	
1998	Mayilpeelikkavu	"Mayilaay Parannu Vaa"	Berny Ignatius	S. Ramesan Nair	Solo	
1998	Thalolam	"Omanathinkalkkidavo"	Kaithapram	Kaithapram	Solo	
1998	Maayajaalam	"Mirdu Sirdu"	S. P. Venkatesh	Bichu Thirumala	Solo	
1999	Diamond Palace	"Poomani Maarano"	K. J. Vijay	Sainuddheen	K. J. Yesudas	
2000	Devadoothan	"En Jeevane"	Vidyasagar	Kaithapram	Solo	
2001	Mazhamegapraavukal	"Kanne Kanmani"	Palakkadu K. L. Sreeram	Gireesh Puthenchery	Solo	
2001	Dubai	"Saandhyathaaram Thiriyanachu"	Vidyasagar	Gireesh Puthenchery	Solo	
2001	Akashathile Paravakal	"Ponnumkudathinu"	S. Balakrishnan	S. Ramesan Nair	K. J. Yesudas	
2001	Akashathile Paravakal	"Kaattunjalidaam"	S. Balakrishnan	S. Ramesan Nair	M. G. Sreekumar	
2001	Onnaam Raagam	"Manjuneeril Nananju"	Jerson Antony	Bichu Thirumala	Solo	
2001	Chethaaram	"Manasse Ninte"	Mohan Sithara	Gireesh Puthenchery	Solo	
2001	Ponnu	"Kilikal Kilikal"	Subhash	Sidharthan	Solo	
2001	"Kalaasubhage"		Subhash	Sidharthan	Solo	
2002	Kanal Kireedam	"Chirikkumbol Koode" (resung)	M. B. Sreenivasan	Sreekumaran Thampi	Solo	
2002	Onnaman	"Mizhiyithalil"	S. P. Venkatesh	Gireesh Puthenchery	K. J. Yesudas	
2005	Chanthupottu	"Aazhakkadalinte"	Vidyasagar	Vayalar Sarathchandra Varma	Solo	
2008	Kanal Kannaadi	"Ennunnippoovinu"	Edwin Abraham	O. N. V. Kurup	Solo	
2008	Mizhikal Sakshi	"Thaazhampoothottilil"	V. Dakshinamoorthy	O. N. V. Kurup	Solo	
2015	Uthara Chemmeen	"Kadale Alakadale"	K. S. Binu Anand	Vayalar Sarathchandra Varma	Solo	
2015	Uthara Chemmeen	"Pazhamozhiyude Choondakalode"	K. S. Binu Anand	Vayalar Sarathchandra Varma	M. G. Sreekumar	
2016	10 Kalpanakal	"Ammappoovinum"	Mithun Eshwar	Roy Puramadom	Solo	
