= Theeraatha Bandhangal =

- Directed by: Dr. Joshua
- Starring: Babu Joseph; Salini
- Music by: K. Raghavan
- Production company: GJ Arts
- Distributed by: GJ Arts
- Release date: 26 February 1982
- Country: India
- Language: Malayalam

Theeraatha Bandhangal is a 1982 Indian Malayalam film, directed by Dr. Joshua. The film stars Babu Joseph and Salini in the lead roles. The film has musical score by K. Raghavan.

== Cast ==
- Babu Joseph
- Salini

== Soundtrack ==
The music was composed by K. Raghavan and the lyrics were written by Poovachal Khader.

| No. | Song | Singers | Lyrics | Length (m:ss) |
|---|---|---|---|---|
| 1 | "Edi Enthedi Raajamme" | S. Janaki, Kanakambaran | Poovachal Khader | |
| 2 | "Enthe Oru Naanam" | P. Susheela | Poovachal Khader | |
| 3 | "Saayam Sandhya" | S. Janaki | Poovachal Khader | |
| 4 | "Udayam Namukkiniyum" | K. J. Yesudas | Poovachal Khader | |
