= Prem Nazir filmography =

This is a partial filmography of Prem Nazir. Prem Nazir was an Indian actor who worked primarily in Malayalam cinema films. Nazir holds two Guinness World Records; for playing the lead role in a record 724 films, and for playing opposite the same actress in 110 films (with Sheela). He has acted with 80 actresses and 39 films were released in a single year once.

== Malayalam ==
He has acted in about 900 movies.

=== 1950s ===
Year	Film	Role	Notes
1951	Thyagaseema		First film he acted but it never got released
1952	Marumakal		Debut. Credited as Abdul Khader.
1952	Visappinte Vili		First film with the name Prem Nazir.
1952	Achan		
1953	Ponkathir	Ravi	
1954	Manasakshi	Vijayan	
1954	Balya Sakhi	Venu	
1954	Avan Varunnu		
1954	Avakashi	Vijayan	
1955	Kidappadam		
1955	C.I.D.	C.I.D. Sudhakaran	
1955	Aniyathi	Appu	
1956	Manthravadi	Priyan	
1956	Athmarpanam		
1956	Avar Unarunnu		
1957	Padatha Painkili	Thankachan	
1957	Jailppulli	Gopi/Ravi	
1957	Deva Sundari		
1958	Mariakutty	Pappachan	
1958	Lilly		
1959	Chathurangam		

=== 1960s ===
Year	Film	Role	Notes
1960	Seeta	Sreeraman	
1961	Unniyarcha	Kunjiraman	
1961	Krishna Kuchela	Krishnan	
1961	Jnaanasundari	Prince Philendran	
1962	Shree Rama Pattabhishekam	Sree Raman	
1962	Laila Majnu	Qais	
1962	Kalpadukal		
1963	Snapaka Yohannan	Julius	
1963	Sathyabhama		
1963	Ninamaninja Kalpadukal	Thankachan	
1963	Kalayum Kaminiyum	Ravi	
1963	Kaattumaina		
1963	Chilamboli		
1964	School Master	Aniyan	
1964	Pazhassi Raja	Kannavathu Nambiar	
1964	Oral Koodi Kallanayi	Prabhakaran	
1964	Kutti Kuppayam	Jabbar	
1964	Kudumbini	Madhavan	
1964	Karutha Kai	Baasu	
1964	Devaalayam		
1964	Bhargavi Nilayam	Sasikumar	
1964	Aayisha	Basheer	
1964	Althaara		
1965	Thankakudam		
1965	Shakuntala		
1965	Rosy		
1965	Rajamalli		
1965	Porter Kunjali	Shalee Doctor	
1965	Odeyil Ninnu	Gopi	
1965	Muthalali	Venu/Velu	
1965	Murappennu	Balan	
1965	Mayavi	Raghu	
1965	Kuppivala	Majeed	
1965	Kochumon	George	
1965	Kavyamela	Jayadevan	
1965	Kathirunna Nikah	Kabir	
1965	Kaliyodam	Gopi	
1965	Jeevitha Yaathra	Venu/Minnal Ramu	
1965	Inapravugal	Anthony	
1965	Devatha		
1965	Chettathy	Prabhakaran	
1965	Bhoomiyile Malakha	Sunny	
1966	Thilothama		
1966	Sthanarthi Saramma	Johny	
1966	Station Master		
1966	Priyathama		
1966	Poochakkanni		
1966	Pinchu Hridhayam		
1966	Pennmakkal		
1966	Kunjali Marakkar	Antonio/Narayana Nair	
1966	Koottukar	Rahim	
1966	Kanmanikal		
1966	Kanaka Chilanga		
1966	Kalyana Rathriyil	Rajagopal	
1966	Kalithozhan	Venu	
1966	Kadamattathachan		
1966	Iruttinte Athmavu	Velayudhan	
1966	Anarkali	Prince Salim	
1967	Udhyogastha	Gopi	
1967	Swapna Bhoomi		
1967	Ramanan	Ramanan	
1967	Pooja		
1967	Pareeksha	Vijayan	
1967	Paathirapattu		
1967	Ollathu Mathi		
1967	N.G.O		
1967	Nagareme Nandi	Madhavankutty	
1967	Naadan Pennu	Babu	
1967	Kudumbam		
1967	Kottayam Kolacase		
1967	Kasavuthattam	Abu	
1967	Kaanatha Veshangal		
1967	Jeevikkan Anuvadikku		
1967	Collector Malathy	Ravi Varma	
1967	Cochin Express	Rajan	
1967	Chitramela	Babu	
1967	Bhagyamudra		
1967	Balyakalasakhi	Majeed	
1967	Ashwamedham	Mohanan	
1967	Agniputhri	Rajendran	
1968	Vidyarthi		
1968	Velutha Kathreena	Thirumeni	
1968	Thulabharam	Ramu	
1968	Thokkukal Kadha Parayunnu	Aniyankunju	
1968	Thirichadi	Kuttappan, Venu	Double role
1968	Punnapra Vayalar	Prabhakaran	
1968	Padunna Puzha	Jayachandran	
1968	Love in Kerala	Jayachandran	
1968	Lakshaprabhu		
1968	Kodungallooramma	Kovalan	
1968	Kayalkkarayil		
1968	Inspector		
1968	Dial 2244		
1968	Bharyamar Sookshikkuka	Suresh	
1968	Asuravithu	Govindankutty	
1968	Anchu Sundarikal		
1968	Agni Pareeksha	Ramesh	
1969	Virunnukari	Madhavankutty	
1969	Vilakuranja Manushyan		
1969	Soosi	Rajan	
1969	Rest House	Reghu	
1969	Rahasyam	Babu, K.K.Nair	Double role
1969	Poojapushpam		
1969	Padicha Kallan		
1969	Nadhi	Johnny	
1969	Mr. Kerala		
1969	Mooladhanam	Mammootty	
1969	Koottukudumbam	Radhakrishna Kurup	
1969	Kannoor Deluxe	Thirumeni /CID Officer	
1969	Kallichellamma	Kunjachan	
1969	Kadalpalam	Murali	
1969	Jwala	Ravi	
1969	Danger Biscuit	Balachandran	
1969	Ballatha Pahayan	Subair	
1969	Anaachadanam		
1969	Adimakal	Raghavan (Pottan)	
1969	Aalmaram	Soman	

=== 1970s ===
Year	Film	Role	Notes
1970	Vivahitha	Rajendran	
1970	Vivaham Swargathil		
1970	Thriveni	Shivaraman	
1970	Thurakkatha Vathil	Bappu	
1970	Thara	Venugopal	
1970	Saraswathi	Unni Kurup	
1970	Rakthapushpam	Shivan	
1970	Pearl View	Lorence	
1970	Palunku Pathram		
1970	Othenente Makan	Ambu	
1970	Nizhalattam	Ravi	
1970	Ningalenne Communistakki	Gopalan	
1970	Nazhikakkallu	Suresh	
1970	Moodalmanju	Rajesh/Raju	
1970	Mindapennu	Chandran	
1970	Lottery Ticket	Venugopal	
1970	Kurukshethram		
1970	Kalpana	Surendran, Ezhuthukaran	Double role
1970	Kakkathamburatti	Naanu	
1970	Ezhuthatha Katha	Prathapachandran	
1970	Dathuputhran	Ponnachan	
1970	Aranazhikaneram	Rajan	
1970	Anadha		
1970	Ammayenna Sthree	Hari	
1970	Ambalapravu	Udhaya Varma	
1970	Aa Chithrasalabham Parannotte	Chandran	
1971	Vilakkuvangiya Veena	Vijayan	
1971	Sumangali		
1971	Shiksha	Shiva Sankaran/Prabhakaran	
1971	Puthanveedu		
1971	Neethi		
1971	Muthassi	Venu	
1971	Moonupukkal		
1971	Makane Ninakku Vendi	Sam, Thomachan	Double role
1971	Marunnattil Oru Malayali	Mathai/Villuvadri Iyyer	
1971	Lanka Dahanam	Appunni/Jayachandran	
1971	Kalithozhi	Ravi	
1971	Gangasangamam	Thomaskutty	
1971	Ernakulam Junction	Madhu, Vikraman, Ravi	Triple role
1971	C.I.D. Nazir	C. I. D. Nazir	
1971	Anubhavangal Paalichakal	Gopalan	
1972	Taxi Car	CID Nazir	
1972	Sambhavami Yuge Yuge	Vasu	
1972	Pushpanjali	Ravi, Thampi, Chandran	Triple role
1972	Punarjanmam	Aravindan	
1972	Postmane Kananilla	Ramu/Ramachandran, Ramu's Father	Double role
1972	Oru Sundariyude Katha	Maadan/Kuttappan	
1972	Omana	Babu	
1972	Nirthasala	Rajendran	
1972	Miss Mary	Gopi	
1972	Mayiladumkunnu	Joy	
1972	Maaya	Madhavankutty	
1972	Maravil Thirivu Sookshikkuka	Jayadevan	
1972	Manushyabandhangal	Sekharan	
1972	Manthrakodi	Venu	
1972	Gandharava Kshetram	Gandharvan, Gopalan	Double role
1972	Devi		
1972	Brahmachari	Jayachandran	
1972	Aromalunni	Kunjiraman, Aromalunni	Double role
1972	Anveshanam		
1972	Aaradi Manninte Janmi	K Sethumadhavan Nair	
1972	Aadhyathe Katha	Soman	
1973	Veendum Prabatham	Ravi	
1973	Urvashi Bharathi		
1973	Thottavadi	Dr. John	
1973	Thiruvabharanam		
1973	Maram	Ibrahim	
1973	Thenaruvi		
1973	Thaniniram	Prabhakaran	
1973	Sasthram Jayichu Manushyan Thottu	Prakash	
1973	Poymughangal		
1973	Ponnapuram Kotta		
1973	Police Ariyaruthu		
1973	Pavangal Pennungal		
1973	Panitheeratha Veedu	Jose	
1973	Panchavadi	Satheesh	
1973	Padmavyooham	Stephen	
1973	Pacha Nottukal	Paulose	
1973	Manassu		
1973	Ladies Hostel	Rajan	
1973	Kaalachakram	Ravi	
1973	Interview	Vijayan	
1973	Football Champion	Vijayan, Thakil Veerachami	Double role
1973	Divyadharsanam		
1973	Dharmayudham	Kochaniyan	
1973	Darshanam		
1973	Chukku		
1973	Bhadradeepam	Rajasekharan	
1973	Azhakulla Saleena	Kunjachan	
1973	Angathattu	Kadathanadan Ambadi	
1973	Ajnathavasam	Ravindran	
1973	Achaani	Vasu	
1974	Thumbolarcha	Aromal Chekavar	
1974	Thacholi Marumakan Chandu	Othenan, Chandu	Double role
1974	Suprabhatham		
1974	Sethubandhanam	Gopinath	
1974	Sapthaswaragal		
1974	Rahasyarathri	Venu	
1974	Rajahamsam	Chandran	
1974	Pattabhishekam		
1974	Pancha Thanthram	Rajendran, Sekhar	Double role
1974	Pathiravum Pakalvelichavum		Double role
1974	Night Duty	Radhakrishnan	
1974	Nellu	Raghavan Nair	
1974	Neela Kannukal		
1974	Honeymoon		Double role
1974	Durga	Prof. Damodaran, Ramu	Double role
1974	College Girl	Rajan	
1974	Chandrakantham	Vinayan, Ajayan	Double role
1974	Chanchala		
1974	Poonthenaruvi	Ouseph	
1974	Chakravakam	Raghavan	
1974	Bhoomi Devi Pushpiniyayi	Sethumadhavan	
1974	Ayalathe Sundari	Ravi	
1974	Aswathy		
1974	Arakkallan Mukkalkkallan	Naagan	
1975	Tourist Bungalow		
1975	Thaamarathoni		
1975	Thiruvonam	Babu	
1975	Sooryavamsham		
1975	Sindhu	Jayadevan	
1975	Sammanam	Bhaskaran	
1975	Raasaleela		
1975	Pulivalu		
1975	Priyamulla Sophia		
1975	Pravaham		
1975	Picnic	Rajagopal, Ravivarma	Double role
1975	Palaazhi Madhanam		
1975	Padmaragam		
1975	Neela Ponman	Ivano	
1975	Manishada	Gopi	
1975	Love Marriage	Madhu	
1975	Kottaram Vilakkanundu	Murali	Double role
1975	Hello Darling	Venu	
1975	Dharmakshetre Kurukshetre		
1975	Chumaduthangi	Narendran	
1975	Chief Guest		
1975	Cheenavala	Pushkkaran	
1975	Chattambi Kalyani	Gopi/CID Narendranath	
1975	Babu Mon	Unnikrishnan	
1975	Ayodhya	Narayanan	
1975	Ashtamirohini		
1975	Alibabayum 41 Kallanmaarum	Alibaba	
1975	Abhimaanam	Murali	
1975	Aaranya Kandam	Unnikrishnan, duplicate Unnikrishnan	Double role
1976	Vazhivilakku		
1976	Vanadevatha	Suresh, Chandran	Double role
1976	Thulavarsham	Balan	
1976	Themmadi Vellappan	Velappan	
1976	Seemantha Puthran		
1976	Rajayogam		
1976	Pushpasaram		
1976	Prasaadam	Sankarankutti	
1976	Pick Pocket	Chandran	
1976	Panchami	Ranger Soman	
1976	Paarijatham		Double role
1976	Ozhukkinethire		
1976	Mallanum Mathevanum		
1976	Light House	Ravi/Omanakuttan	
1976	Kaayamkulam Kochunniyude Makan		
1976	Kanyadanam		
1976	Kamadhenu	Chandran	
1976	Chottanikkara Amma		
1976	Chirikudukka	Preman	
1976	Chennai Valarthiya Kutty	Sreeni, Maranchadi	Double role
1976	Amrithavaahini	Vijayan	
1976	Ammini Ammaavan	Gopi	
1976	Ajayanum Vijayanum	Ajayan, Vijayan	Double role
1976	Agnipushpam		
1976	Aayiram Janmangal	Madhavan Nair	
1977	Vishukkani	Gopi	
1977	Veedu Oru Swargam		
1977	Varadhakshina		
1977	Thuruppu Gulan		
1977	Tholkkan Enikku Manassilla		
1977	Sujatha		
1977	Sooryakaanthi		
1977	Samudram	Rajashekharan Nair	
1977	Saghakkale Munottu		
1977	Rathimanmathan	Maran / Sreekumar	
1977	Randu Lokam	Surendran	
1977	Parivarthanam	Madhu	
1977	Panchamrutham	Dr. Rajan	
1977	Muttathe Mulla	Gopi	
1977	Mohavum Mukthiyum		
1977	Mini Mol		
1977	Lakshmi	Krishnan	
1977	Kannappanunni	Kannappanuni, Durgadasan	Double role
1977	Kaduvaye Pidicha Kiduva		
1977	Ivanente Priyaputhran		
1977	Innale Innu	Gopi	
1977	Hridayame Sakshi	Murali	
1977	Chathurvedam		
1977	Aval Oru Devaalayam		
1977	Aparadhi	Rajan	
1977	Aparaajitha		
1977	Anugraham	Rajan	
1977	Anjali		
1977	Akshayapaathram		
1977	Acharam Ammini Osaram Omana	Pakkaran	
1978	Yagaswam	Unnikrishnan	
1978	Vilakkum Velichavum		
1978	Tharu Oru Janmam Koodi		
1978	Thacholi Ambu	Thacholi Ambu	
1978	Sundharimarude Swapnangal		
1978	Snehathinte Mukhangal	Sreedharan	
1978	Sathrusamhaaram		
1978	Raju Rahim	Raju	
1978	Prarthana		
1978	Paadasaram		
1978	Nivedhyam	Jayadevan	
1978	Ninakku Njaanum Enikku Neeyum	Balan	
1978	Mudra Mothiram	Sudhakaran	
1978	Lisa	Murali	
1978	Kudumbam Namakku Sreekovil	Gopi	
1978	Kanal Kattakal	Panikkar, Vijayan	Double role
1978	Kalpa Vriksham	Rajendran	
1978	Kadathanattu Maakkam	Nambeeshan, Kannan	Double role
1978	Jayikkaanaay Janichavan	Minnal Raju	
1978	Gaandharvam		
1978	Ee Ganam Marakkumo	Gopi	
1978	Bharyayum Kamukiyum		
1978	Ashtamudikkaayal		
1978	Amarsham		
1978	Aana Paachan	Paachan/Gopi	
1978	Ward No. 7		
1979	Vijayanum Veeranum	Vijayan, Veeran	Double role
1979	Vellayani Paramu	Paramu	
1979	Vaaleduthaven Vaalaal		
1979	Thirayum Theeravum	Adv. Premachandran	
1979	Tharangam	Madhu	
1979	Sarpam	Ramesh	
1979	Prabhu	Prabhu	
1979	Pichathy Kuttappan	Pichathy Kuttappan	
1979	Pambaram	Hari	
1979	Ormayil Nee Maathram	Suresh	
1979	Manava Dharmam		
1979	Maamaankam	Chanthunni	
1979	Kathirmandapam		
1979	Kaalam Kaathu Ninnilla		
1979	Irumbazhikal	Inspector Rajan	
1979	Iniyum Kaanaam	Ramdas	
1979	Indradhanussu	Gopi	

=== 1980s ===
Year	Film	Role	Notes
1980	Theeram Thedunnavar		
1980	Theekkadal	Balakrishnan	
1980	Pralayam	Rajashekharan	
1980	Paallattu Kunjikannan	Palattu Kunjikannan	
1980	Naayattu	Rowdy Abdulla	
1980	Mr. Michael	Michael	
1980	Lava	Ramu	
1980	Kari Puranda Jeevithangal	Balan	
1980	Ithikkara Pakki	Ithikkara Pakki	
1980	Digvijayam	Vasu	
1980	Chandrahaasam	Rajan	
1980	Anthappuram	Vijayan	
1980	Air Hostess	Jayan	
1980	Agnikshethram	Suresh	
1980	Love in Singapore	Premachandran	
1981	Asthamikkatha Pakalukal	Prabhakaran	
1981	Vida Parayum Mumbe	Madhavan Kutty	
1981	Thenum Vayambum	V. C. Menon	
1981	Theekkali		Double role
1981	Thakilu Kottampuram	Rajakrishna Kurup	
1981	Thadavara		
1981	Thaalam Manasinte Thaalam		
1981	Sankharsham	Rajashekaran	
1981	Sanchari	Sumesh, Suresh	Double role
1981	Raktham	CI Haridas	
1981	Parvathy	Urimees	
1981	Paathira Sooryan	James	
1981	Kodumudikal	P K Gopalan	
1981	Kilungaatha Changalakal	Mohan	
1981	Kadathu	Gopinadhan	
1981	Kattukallan	Balram	
1981	Kaahalam		
1981	Ithihaasam		
1981	Itha Oru Dhikkari	Ravi	
1981	Ellaam Ninakku Vendi	Dr. Rajendran	
1981	Dhruvasangamam		
1981	Choothattam		
1981	Charam	James	
1981	Attimari	Soman	
1981	Ariyappedatha Rahasyam	Vijayan	
1981	Adima Changala		
1982	Irattimadhuram	Achuthan Nair	
1982	Sree Ayyappanum Vavarum	Vavaru	
1982	Raktha Sakshi		
1982	Post Mortem	Vikariyachan, C.I.of Police	Double role
1982	Ponmudy	Diwakaran	
1982	Padayottam	Udayan	
1982	Paanjajanyam	Venu	
1982	Oru Thira Pinneyum Thira	Gopinath	
1982	Nagamadathu Thampuratti	Jayadevan	
1982	Mazha Nilaavu	Singapore Menon	
1982	Mylanji		
1982	Marupacha	Premachandran, Prem Kumar	
1982	Keni	Premachandran, Prem Kumar	Double role
1982	Jambulingam	Jambulingam Nadar	
1982	Ivan Oru Simham	Babu Suresh	
1982	Idiyum Minnalum		
1982	Dhrohi		
1982	Champalkaadu	Kumar	
1982	Anguram	Jayan	
1982	Anga Chamayam	Jayadevan	
1982	Aarambham	Devarajan	
1982	Aakrosham	Rajashekharan Thambi	
1982	Aadharsam	Raveendran	
1983	Yudham	Bappootty	
1983	Theeram Thedunna Thira	Sudhakaran	
1983	Prathigna	Prabhakaran/Prabhu	
1983	Prasnam Gurutharam	Ramamurthy	
1983	Passport	Khader	
1983	Oru Madapravinte Katha	Ravi Prasad	
1983	Onnu Chirikku	Unnikrishnan	
1983	Mortuary	Rajashekaran	
1983	Marakkillorikkalum	Madhavan Thampi	
1983	Mahabali	Mahabali	
1983	Kodungattu	DSP Sudheendran IPS	
1983	Karyam Nissaram	Unnithan	
1983	Justice Raja	Justice Raja, Gopi	Double role
1983	Himam	Prasad	
1983	Ente Katha	Sreekumar, Sankar	Double role
1983	Mazhanilavu	Singapore Menon	
1983	Ee Yugam	Dr. Prasad	
1983	Deepaaradhana	Rahim	
1983	Chakravalam Chuvannappol	Dr. Menon	
1983	Bhookambam	Mahendran	
1983	Bandham		
1983	Attakkalasham	C. K. Balachandran	
1983	Angam	Antony/ William D'curz	
1983	Adhyathe Anuragam	Suresh	
1983	Adhipathyam	Raveendran	
1983	Aashrayam		
1983	Prem Nazirine Kanmanilla	Prem Nazir	Special appearance as himself
1984	Vikatakavi	Sankunni Nair	
1984	Vellam	Krishnanunni	
1984	Vanitha Police	Pilla	
1984	Nilaavinte Naattil	Ramesh	
1984	Poomadhathe Pennu	Vasudevan	
1984	Piriyilla Naam	Rajashekharan	
1984	Oru Thettinte Katha		
1984	Ningalil Oru Sthree	Ravi	
1984	Manithali	Kunjumuhammed	
1984	Manase Ninakku Mangalam		
1984	Makale Mappu Tharu		
1984	Kurissu Yuddham	James	
1984	Krishna Guruvayoorappa	Poonthanam	
1984	Kadamattathachan	Fr.Paulose	
1984	Inakkily	Zachariah	
1984	Ente Nandinikutty		
1984	Amme Narayana	Vedan, Senadhipathi Chanthu, Vilwamangalam Swamikal	Triple role
1984	Alakadalinakkare	Yusaph	
1985	Vellarikka Pattanam	Alex	
1985	Uyirthezhunnelppu		
1985	Snehicha Kuttathinu	Mohandas	
1985	Shathru		
1985	Sannaham	Varma	
1985	Ozhivukaalam	Das	
1985	Oru Naal Innoru Naal	Khader	
1985	Orikkal Oridathu	Kesava Kurup	
1985	Nerariyum Nerathu	Rajan	
1985	Mukhyamanthri	Ramachandran Menon	
1985	Madhuvidhu Theerum Mumbe	Fr. Kizhakkethil	
1985	Dheivatheyorthu		
1985	Oru Sandesam Koodi		Cameo
1985	Manya Mahajanangale	Nizar Ahammed	
1986	Udayam Padinjaru	Ittychan	
1986	Ayalvasi Oru Daridravasi	Adithya Varma	
1988	Dhwani	Rajasekharan Nair	
1989	Lal Americayil	Ravi Varma	Posthumous film
1990	Kadathanadan Ambadi	Payyappilly Chanthu Gurukkal	Posthumous film

== Tamil films ==
Year	Film	Role	Notes
1952	Pasiyin Kodumai		Debut Tamil film
1953	Thanthai	Chandran	
1956	Manthravadi		
1958	Thai Pirandhal Vazhi Pirakkum	Varadhan	
1958	Nalla Idathu Sambandham	Manickam	
1958	Naan Valartha Thangai		
1958	Peria Koil		
1959	Arumai Magal Abirami		
1959	Ulagam Sirikkirathu	Sankar	
1959	Uzhavukkum Thozhilukkum Vandhanai Seivom		
1959	Orey Vazhi		
1959	Kalyanikku Kalyanam	Sundaram	
1959	Koodi Vazhnthal Kodi Nanmai		
1959	Sahodhari	Chandran	
1959	Sollu Thambi Sollu	Chinnathambi	
1959	Vannakili	Mayan	
1959	Thamarai Kulam		
1960	Irumanam Kalanthal Thirumanam		
1960	Ondrupattal Undu Vazhvu		
1960	Thangam Manasu Thangam	Rajan	
1960	Thangarathinam		
1960	Thilakam		
1960	Aasthikkoraanum Ashaikkoru Pennum		
1960	Anbukor Anni		
1960	Petraval Kanda Peruvazhvu		
1960	Paavai Vilakku	Thanikachalam's friend	Guest appearance
1961	Palum Pazhamum	Sekar	
1962	Pirandha Naal		
1962	Thendral Veesum		
1963	Kaattumaina		
1964	Muradan Muthu	Chinna Zamindar	
1966	Kattu Malligai		
1977	Uyarnthavargal		Guest appearance

== Other languages ==
Year	Film	Role	Language	Notes
1953	Gunasagari		Kannada	
