= Kaviyoor Ponnamma =

Indian actress (1945–2024)

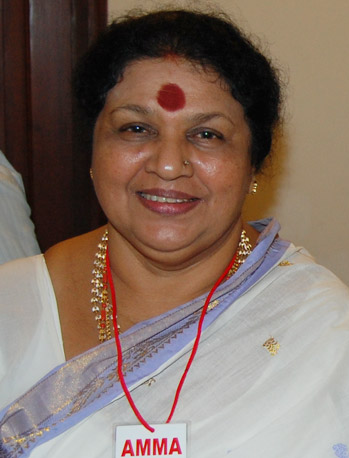
- Ponnamma in 2007
- Born: 10 September 1945; Kaviyoor, Thiruvalla, Kingdom of Travancore, British India
- Died: 20 September 2024 (aged 79); Kochi, Kerala, India
- Occupation: Actress
- Years active: 1959–2022
- Spouse: M. K. Maniswami (m. 1969; died 2011)
- Children: 1
- Parents: T. P. Damodharan; Gauri
- Relatives: Kaviyoor Renuka (sister)

Kaviyoor Ponnamma (10 September 1945 – 20 September 2024) was an Indian actress who appeared in Malayalam films and television. Ponnamma had acted in around 700 movies in her career spanning more than six decades. She began her career performing in theatre dramas before foraying into cinema. She also acted in TV serials and commercials and had playback singing credits in few films.

Ponnamma was a four-time Kerala State Film Award for Second Best Actress winner. Her sister Kaviyoor Renuka was also an actress. Often called as the "mother to all actors", she acted as mother of almost all actors in her career spanning over decades. At the age of 20, she played the mother of older actors Sathyan and Madhu in Thommente Makkal (1965). She particularly gained critical acclaim for acting as the mother of Mohanlal.

== Early life ==
Ponnamma was born to T. P. Damodharan and Gauri, as the eldest of seven children, on 10 September 1945 in Kaviyoor, Thiruvalla. She had six siblings among whom Kaviyoor Renuka (d. 2004), her younger sister, was also an actress. Even though she was born in Kaviyoor, her childhood was spent in Ponkunnam where her father was doing business. She began taking singing lessons from age five. Ever since she saw a live concert of M. S. Subbulakshmi, she wanted to be a singer and even "look like her". Her arengettam (singing debut) was held in Kaviyoor when she was 11 years old, where she was first introduced by her stage name "Kaviyoor Ponnamma".

== Career ==
As a five-year-old, she learned music and sang in stage shows. Ponnamma started her career as a singer with 'Pratibha Arts' theatre group at the age of 14. She was a disciple of popular musicians RLP Varma and Vechoor S Harihara Subramanya Aiyer. At around that time (In 1958), she was spotted by Kerala People's Arts Club (KPAC) who was looking for a girl who can sing in their stage play. They also gave her the role of heroine in Mooladhanam, her debut stage drama at age 13. It was directed by Thoppil Bhasi. After five years came her first movie Kudumbini, in which she did the title role of the mother of two children.

== Personal life and death ==
Ponnamma was married to film producer Maniswami in 1969. The couple has a daughter Bindhu who is married and settled in the United States. Maniswami died in 2011 after a long illness.

Ponnamma died from cancer at Lissie Hospital in Kochi, Kerala, on 20 September 2024, at the age of 79.

== Awards ==
=== Kerala State Film Awards ===
- Second Best Actress in 1971, 1972, 1973 and 1994

=== Other awards ===
- Film City Magazine- Chalachitra Ratnam' Title – 2006
- Pappanamkode Lakshmanan Award – 2006
- O Madhavan Award – 2009
- Bharath Murali Award – 2012
- Kala Ratna award – EV Kala Mandalam – 2013
- PK Rosy Award – 2015
- Good Knight Film and Business Awards – 2017
- Gurupranam – Honour by Malayalam Cine Technicians’ Association (MACTA) – 2013
- Honour by KSFDC – 2015
- Honour by Kerala State Film Awards – 2016
- Felicitation by Kerala State Film Awards – 2017
- Kausalya Vandanam programme Honour – 2017
- Kalaiselvam Award – Government of Tamil Nadu
- Honour by Kaviyoor Panchayat
- DLSA Honour

== Filmography ==
=== As an actress ===
==== 1950s ====
Year	Title	Role	Notes
1958	Mariakutty		

==== 1960s ====
Year	Title	Role	Notes
1962	Sreerama Pattabhishekam	Mandodari	
1963	Kalayum Kaminiyum		
1964	Bharthavu	Santha	
1964	Atom Bomb	Dolly Lakshmi	
1964	Kudumbini	Lakshmi	
1965	Daaham	Lakshmi Teacher	
1965	Thommante Makkal	Achaamma	
1965	Odayil Ninnu	Kalyani	
1965	Rosie	Rosi	
1966	Kanmanikal		
1966	Kayamkulam Kochunni		
1966	Jail	Karthyayaniyamma	
1966	Pinchu Hridayam	Saraswathi	
1967	Swapnabhoomi	Saraswathy	
1967	Pooja	Eeswariyamma	
1967	Postman		
1967	Sahadharmini		
1967	Anweshichu Kandethiyilla	Annie's mother	
1968	Asuravithu	Kunjootty	
1968	Vazhi Pizhacha Santhathi		
1968	Velutha Kathreena	Martha Pulayi	
1969	Vilakuranja Manushyan		
1969	Kattukurangu	Thulasi	
1969	Aalmaram	Ammini Amma	
1969	Nadhi	Thresia	

==== 1970s ====
Year	Title	Role	Notes
1970	Palunku Pathram		
1970	Ammayenna Sthree	Jaanu	
1970	Aa Chithrashalabham Parannotte	Lakshmi	
1970	Kalpana	Dakshayaniyamma	
1970	Othenente Makan	Naani	
1970	Cross Belt	Bhavani	
1970	Vivahitha	Kamala	
1970	Thriveni	Parvathi	
1970	Nizhalattam	Ravi's Mother	
1970	Anadha	Sarojam	
1971	C.I.D. In Jungle		
1971	Jalakanyaka		
1971	Bobanum Moliyum	Santhamma	
1971	Kalithozhi	Parvathy Amma	
1971	Sarasayya	Thomaskutty's mother	
1971	Karinizhal	Vishva Lakshmi	
1971	Vivahasammanam	Parukuttyamma	
1971	Oru Penninte Katha	Subhadra	
1971	Karakanakadal	Tharuthi	
1971	Shiksha	Meenakshi	
1971	Vithukal	Ammini	
1971	Makane Ninakku Vendi	Thomachan's mother	
1971	Aabhijathyam	Janaki	
1972	Kalippava		
1972	Anweshanam	Ponnamma	
1972	Puthrakameshti	Malati	
1972	Snehadeepame Mizhi Thurakku	Seetha	
1972	Sathi	Pick-pocket's mother	
1972	Sree Guruvayoorappan	Kururamma	
1972	Theerthayathra	Kochikkavu	
1972	Akkarapacha	Bhageerathi	
1972	Manthrakodi	Saraswathi	
1972	Aromalunni	Thumbolarcha	
1972	Gaandharvakshethram	Kalamezuthu Pattukari	
1972	Aadhyathe Katha	Ammukuttiyamma	
1972	Pushpanjali	Bhagi	
1973	Kavitha		
1973	Chenda		
1973	Enippadikal		
1973	Periyar	Thresiakutty	
1973	Thiruvabharanam	Antharjanam	
1973	Ponnapuram Kotta	Uppaathi	
1973	Nakhangal	Kakkachi	
1973	Divyadharsanam	Poojarini Amma	
1973	Angathattu	Kunjukutti	
1973	Dharmayudham	Bhadra Thampuratti	
1973	Interview	Saraswathi	
1973	Thaniniram	Subhadra	
1973	Nirmalyam	Narayani	
1974	Chanchala		
1974	Neelakannukal	Chellamma	
1974	Suprabhatham	Baadal's mother	
1974	Arakkallan Mukkalkkallan	Lakshmi Thampuratti	
1974	Nellu	Savithri Varassyar	
1974	Manyasree Viswamithran	Bhageeradhiyamma	
1974	Thacholi Marumakan Chandu	Unnichirutha	
1974	Night Duty	Savithriyamma	
1974	Chakravakam	Shosamma	
1974	Devi Kanyakumari	Old lady	
1975	Malsaram		
1975	Sammanam		
1975	Tourist Bungalow		
1975	Mattoru Seetha		
1975	Padmaragam		
1975	Abhimaanam	Kamalamma	
1975	Raagam	Blind school principal	
1975	Sindhu	Parvathy Amma	
1975	Chumaduthangi	Lakshmi Amma	
1975	Thiruvonam	Jaanamma	
1975	Makkal	Leela	
1975	Prayanam	Ammini amma	
1975	Utsavam	Gopi's mother	
1975	Pravaham	Lakshmi	
1976	Aruthu		
1976	Paarijatham		
1976	Priyamvada		
1976	Kanyaadaanam		
1976	Seemantha Puthran		
1976	Romeo		
1976	Kaayamkulam Kochunniyude Makan	Suhara	
1976	Vazhivilakku	Janakiyamma	
1976	Ajayanum Vijayanum	Susheela	
1976	Appooppan	Saraswathy	
1976	Chottanikkara Amma	Indu's grandmother	
1976	Amba Ambika Ambalika	Old age Satyavati	
1976	Amrithavaahini	Lakshmi	
1976	Thulavarsham	Balan's mother	
1977	Rowdy Rajamma		
1977	Sreemad Bhagavad Geetha		
1977	Akshayapaathram		
1977	Vezhambal		
1977	Siva Thandavum		
1977	Varadakshina		
1977	Aa Nimisham		
1977	Dheerasameere Yamuna Theere		
1977	Rajaparambara		
1977	Mini Mol	Lakshmiyamma	
1977	Innale Innu	Radha's mother	
1977	Jagadguru Aadisankaran	Kaippilly Aryadevi Antarjanam	
1977	Sreemurukan	Kamalakshi	
1977	Nirakudam	Sathi	
1977	Oonjaal	Bharathi	
1977	Muttathe Mulla	Maheshwari	
1977	Satyavan Savithri	Arundathi Devi	
1977	Itha Ivide Vare	Kamalakshi	
1977	Kodiyettam	Kamalamma	
1977	Randu Lokam	Madhavi	
1977	Achaaram Ammini Osharam Omana	Dakshayani	
1977	Vidarunna Mottukal	Lakshmi	
1977	Paadasaram	Kamalakshi	
1978	Aazhi Alayaazhi		
1978	Aniyara		
1978	Naalumanippookkal		
1978	Seemanthini		
1978	Tiger Salim		
1978	Udayam Kizhakku Thanne		
1978	Sathrathil Oru Raathri		
1978	Pichipoo		
1978	Anubhoothikalude Nimisham		
1978	Society Lady		
1978	Rajan Paranja Kadha		
1978	Prarthana		
1978	Sthree Oru Dukham		
1978	Samayamaayilla Polum	Savithri	
1978	Uthrada Rathri	Gopan's mother	
1978	Kalpavriksham	Nun	
1978	Eeta	Philomina	
1978	Avalude Ravukal	Lakshmi	
1978	Kudumbam Namukku Sreekovil	Yashodha Devi	
1978	Rathinirvedam	Saraswathi	
1978	Randilonnu	Maheshwari	
1979	Manushyan		
1979	Driver Madyapichirunnu		
1979	Pambaram		
1979	Pushyaraagam	Amma	
1979	Aayiram Vasanthangal		
1979	Cheriyachante Kroorakrithyangal	Eliyamma	
1979	Aarattu	Annamma	
1979	Sarpam	Bhavani	
1979	Prabhu	Devaki	
1979	Yakshi Paaru	Thampi's wife	
1979	Itha Oru Theeram	Madhavi	
1979	Prabhaathasandhya	Usha's Mother	
1979	Mamangam	Chathunni's Mother	

==== 1980s ====
Year	Title	Role	Notes
1980	Karnan		
1980	Moorkhan		
1980	Oru Varsham Oru Maasam		
1980	Chamaram	Karthyayani	
1980	Manushya Mrugam	Babu's Mother	
1980	Thirayum Theeravum	Mohan's mother	
1980	Anthappuram	Bhavani	
1980	Pappu	Actress	Guest appearance
1980	Karimpana	Muthan's mother	
1980	Love in Singapore	Premachandran's Mother	
1981	Aarathi		
1981	Swapnaragam		
1981	Anandharam		
1981	Chamayam		
1981	Saahasam		
1981	Nizhal Yudham	Devaki	
1981	Oppol	Narayani amma	
1981	Orikkal Koodi	Chandran's Mother	
1981	Maniyan Pilla Adhava Maniyan Pilla	Devaki	
1981	Sphodanam	Gopi's Mother	
1981	Vayal	Saraswathi	
1981	Agnisaram	Bhavani	
1981	Avatharam	Lakshmikuttyamma	
1981	Thrishna	Chinammu Amma	
1982	Kallimullu		
1982	Bheeman		
1982	Balloon	Lakshmiyamma	
1982	Kaaliya Mardhanam	Geetha's mother	
1982	Beedi Kunjamma	Madhavan's Mother	
1982	Kaattile Paattu	Raji	
1982	Ilakkangal	Unnis' mother	
1982	Maattuvin Chattangale	Jayan's mother	
1982	Paanjajanyam	Lakshmidevi	
1982	Marupacha	Ponnamma	
1983	Pourasham	Saraswathi	
1983	Nathi Muthal Nathi Vare	Adv. Lakshmi	
1983	Oomana Thinkal	Gopi's mother	
1983	Bandham	Sreedeviyamma	
1983	Sesham Kazhchayil	Shankar's mother	
1983	Enikku Vishakunnu	Chinnamma	
1983	Hello Madras Girl	Sreedevi Amma	
1983	Nizhal Moodiya Nirangal	Thambi's & Unni's mother	
1983	Enne Njan Thedunnu	Lakshmiyamma	
1983	Mansoru Maha Samudram	Devaki	
1983	Marakkillorikkalum	Sharada	
1984	Mukhamukham		
1984	Somayagam		
1984	Ente Nandhinikutty		
1984	Ente Gramam		
1984	Ningalil Oru Sthree	Latha's mother	
1984	Oru Painkilikatha	Kamaalakshi	
1984	Swanthamevide Bandhamevide	Lakshmi	
1984	Kodathy	Meenakshiyamma	
1984	Thirakal	Madhaviyamma	
1984	Manithali	Zulfikar's mother	
1984	Lakshmana Rekha	Radha's mother	
1984	Kanamarayathu	Mother Superior	
1984	Ariyaatha Veethikal	Janakiyamma	
1984	Adiyozhukkukal	Mariyamma	
1985	Guerrilla		
1985	Mounam Nombaram	Indu's mother	
1985	Ee Thanalil Ithiri Nerum	Savithri	
1985	Angadikkappurathu	Rosi	
1985	Thinkalaazhcha Nalla Divasam	Janakikutty	
1985	Ente Ammu Ninte Thulasi Avarude Chakki	Sathyabhama	
1985	Adhyayam Onnu Muthal	Lakshmi	
1985	Makan Ente Makan	Paruvamma	
1985	Karimpinpoovinakkare	Bhadran's Mother	
1986	Ariyatha Bandhukkal		
1986	Vishwasichallum Illenkilum		
1986	Kaveri		
1986	Ente Sonia	Shanti	
1986	Akalangalil	Sethu's mother	
1986	Koodanayum Kattu	Annie's Mother	
1986	Sukhamo Devi	Nandan's Mother	
1986	Namukku Parkkan Munthirithoppukal	Rita	
1986	Ennu Nathante Nimmi	Chithambaram's mother	
1986	Iniyum Kurukshetrum	Gomathi	
1986	Surabhi Yaamangal	Meenakshi	
1986	Malarum Kiliyum	Padmavathiyamma	
1986	Manasiloru Manimuthu	Mohan's mother	
1986	Nakhakshathangal	Valiyamma	
1986	Kshamichu Ennoru Vakku	Dr. Shanthamma	
1987	Oru Maymasa Pulariyil		
1987	Irupatham Noottandu	Meenakshmiyamma	
1987	Achuvettante Veedu	Vipin's Mother	
1987	Kaiyethum Doorathu	Janaki	
1987	Thaniyavarthanam	Balan's mother	
1987	Anantaram	Yogini Amma	
1988	Onnum Onnum Pathinonnu		
1988	Marikkunilla Njaan	Narayaniyamma	
1988	1921	Keshavankutty's mother	
1988	Vidaparayamanthram	Karthi	
1988	Ente Amma	Sathyabhama	
1988	Sathyaa	Malayali shop owner	Tamil film
1988	Mukthi	Madhaviyamma	
1989	Swantham Ennu Karuthi		
1989	Unnikrishnante Adyathe Christmas	Aliyamma	
1989	Ulsavapittennu	Kalyaniyamma	
1989	Peruvannapurathe Visheshangal	Devaki Amma	Cameo
1989	Oru Sayahnathinte Swapnam	Mariyamma	
1989	Mazhavilkavadi	Velayudhankutty's mother	
1989	Muthukkudayum Choodi	Madhavi	
1989	Vandanam	Unnikrishnan's mother	
1989	Adhipan	Shyam Prakash's mother	
1989	Aksharathettu	Sumati's mother	
1989	Kireedam	Sethu's mother	
1989	Jaathakam	Janaki	
1989	Devadas	Devadas' Mother	
1989	Dasharatham	Chandradas' Mother	

==== 1990s ====
Year	Title	Role	Notes
1990	Ee Thanutha Veluppan Kalathu	Nurse Leelavathi	
1990	Purappadu	Kunjimaluvamma	
1990	Kadathanadan Ambadi	Kunki	
1990	Kshanakkathu	Vivekanandan's mother	
1990	Nanma Niranjavan Sreenivasan	Sreenivasan's mother	
1990	Kattukuthira	Manka	
1990	Rajavazhcha	Naniyamma	
1990	Kuruppinte Kanakku Pustakom	Vinayachandran's Mother	
1990	In Harihar Nagar	Andrew's mother	
1990	His Highness Abdullah	Bhagirathi Valiya Thampurati	
1990	Midhya	Rajagopal's Mother	
1990	Oliyampukal	Annamma	
1991	Nithyavasanthan Nithyavismayam	Herself	Documentary
1991	Ulladakkam	Sunny's Mother	
1991	Sandesam	Bhanumathi	
1991	Pookkalam Varavayi	Nandan's Mother	
1991	Dhanam	Sivasankaran's mother	
1991	Bharatham	Devaki	
1991	Apoorvam Chilar	Sarojam	
1991	Arangu	Madhavi	
1991	Ezhunnallathu	Mrs. James	
1991	Kizhakkunarum Pakshi	Ananthan's mother	
1991	Aparaahnam	Janakiyamma	
1992	Kudumbasametham	Kochukutty	
1992	Aayushkalam	Aby's mother	
1992	Mugha Mudra	Lakshmi	
1992	Sabarimalayil Thanka Sooryodayam	Chandran Pillai's wife	
1992	Ponnurukkum Pakshi	Lakshmi Amma	
1992	Mahanagaram	Viswanathan's Mother	
1992	Pappayude Swantham Appoos	Meenakshi's mother	
1992	Kingini		
1993	Vietnam Colony	Parvathiyammal	
1993	Samagamam	Annakutty	
1993	Oru Kadankatha Pole	Sekaharan's mother	
1993	Sopanam	Sethulakshmi Varma	
1993	Ottayadipathakal	Anoop's mother	
1993	Gandharvam	Gracy Kutty	
1993	Kalippattam	Sarojam's mother	
1993	Chenkol	Sethumadhavan's mother	
1993	Kavadiyattam	Sethulakshmi	
1993	Maya Mayooram	Janakiyamma	
1993	Vatsalyam	Janaki Amma	
1993	Ithu Manjukalam	Aswathy's and Revathy's mother	
1994	Paamaram		
1994	Vendor Daniel State Licency	Annamma Daniel	
1994	Kudumba Vishesham	Bharathi	
1994	Njan Kodiswaran	Janaki	
1994	Santhanagopalam	Kurup's wife	
1994	Sukrutham	Ravishankar's mother	
1994	Thenmavin Kombath	Yeshodhamma	
1994	Bheesmacharya	Ponnutty	
1994	Chukkan	Lakshmi	
1995	Mumpe Parakkunna Pakshi		
1995	Puzhayorathoru Poojari	Sreedevi	
1995	No. 1 Snehatheeram Bangalore North	Vijayabhaskar's mother	
1995	Saadaram	Bhanumathi	
1995	Minnaminuginum Minnukettu	Hari's mother	
1995	Mannar Mathai Speaking	Meera's Mother	
1995	Karma	Rukmini	
1997	Swantham Makalkku Snehapoorvam		
1997	Itha Oru Snehagatha	Daniel's mother	
1997	Snehasindhooram	Uma's mother	
1997	Amme Prabhathamayi		Short film
1998	Aram Jaalakam		
1998	Priyuralu	Subhadra's mother	Telugu film
1998	Manjeeradwani	Subhadra's mother	
1998	Kottaram Veettile Apputtan	Appoottan's mother	
1998	Poothiruvathira Raavil	Raghu's mema	
1998	Amma Ammaayiyamma	Sarada teacher	
1999	Pallavur Devanarayanan	Bhageerathi	
1999	Njangal Santhushtaranu	Mother of the Orphanage	
1999	The Godman	Amarnath's Mother	
1999	Ezhupunna Tharakan	Kunjannamma	

==== 2000s ====
Year	Title	Role	Notes
2000	Arayannangalude Veedu	Lakshmi	
2000	Ramayanakkili		
2001	Kakkakuyil	Sethu Lakshmi Bhai 'Thampuratty'	
2001	Akashathile Paravakal	Sridevi's grandmother	
2001	Uthaman	Jayaraj's mother	
2002	Nandanam	Unni Amma	
2003	Mr. Brahmachari	Ananthan Thampi's Mother	
2003	Hariharan Pilla Happy Aanu	Padmavathiyamma	
2003	Sahodaran Sahadevan	Mother of Aravindan & Mukundan	
2003	Swantham Malavika	Vysakhan's mother	
2003	Ammakilikkoodu	Marykutty Teacher	
2003	Pattanathil Sundaran	Bhavaniyamma	
2003	Parinamam	Malathi	
2004	Nothing but Life		Cameo
2004	Parijatham		
2004	Njan Salperu Ramankutty	Ramankutty's mother	
2004	Vismayathumbathu	Sreekumar's mother	
2004	Runway	Bharathiyamma	
2004	Natturajavu	Charlie's Mother	
2004	Mampazhakkalam	Lakshmi	
2006	Vadakkumnadhan	Rugmavathi Amma	
2006	Aanachandam		
2006	Baba Kalyani	Meenakshiamma	
2007	Anamika		
2007	Komban	Kichan's mother	
2007	Anchil Oral Arjunan	Easweriyamma	
2008	Twenty:20	Bharathi Amma	
2008	Sultan	Patient	
2008	De Ingottu Nokkiye	Vettikadu Sadasivan's mother	
2008	Gulmohar	Devaki	
2008	Kavyam		
2009	Women in Malayalam Cinema	Herself	
2009	Ividam Swargamanu	Elssama	
2009	Meghatheertham	Gayathri Devi	
2009	2 Harihar Nagar	Andrew's mother	
2009	Kappal Muthalaali	Bhoominathan's mother	

==== 2010s ====
Year	Title	Role	Notes
2011	Christian Brothers	Joseph Vadakkan's mother	
2011	Marananantharam		
2011	101 Ruppika		
2011	Collector	Avinash Varma's mother	
2011	Swapnamalika		
2011	Ithu Nammude Katha	Vinod's grandmother	
2012	Best Wishes		
2012	Lumiere Brothers	Herself	Archive footage
2012	Orkut Oru Ormakoot	Amminiyamma	
2012	Mazhavillinattam Vare		
2012	Namukku Parkkan	Rajeev's mother	
2012	Manjadikuru	Devayani	
2012	Theruvu Nakshatrangal	Mukundan's mother	
2012	Mr. Marumakan	Bhavani Amma	
2013	Ginger	Vivekanandan's mother	
2013	Kadal Kadannu Oru Maathukutty	Mariyamma	
2014	Tharangal	Herself	Photo only
2014	Avatharam	Madhavan's mother	
2014	100 Degree Celsius	Lovely's mother-in-law	
2015	Njan Samvidhanam Cheyyum	Swamini Amma	
2016	Kammal		
2016	Dhanayathra	Vijila's mother	
2016	Poy Maranju Paranju	Vinu's grandmother	
2016	Pa Va	Agnes/Sister amma	
2016	Oppam	Jayaraman's valiyammayi	
2016	Thoppil Joppan	Joppan's mother	
2016	Oru Muthassi Gadha		
2017	Manchatti	Mariyamma	Short film
2017	Achayans	Valyammichi	
2017	Vedam	Sabarinath's grandmother	
2019	Mr. Pavanayi 99.99	Soni's grandmother	
2019	Muthassikkoru Muthu	Naani Muthassi	
2019	Mamangam	Puthumana Thampuratti	

==== 2020s ====
Year	Title	Role	Notes
2021	Aanum Pennum	Kuttan's mother	Segment : Rani
2021	Ammachikoottile Pranayakalam	Ummachi	
2022	Aaraattu	—N/a	Uncredited voice only
2022	Kannadi		

=== As a film playback singer ===
- 1963 – "Kaavilamme Karinkali" – Kaattumaina
- 1968 – "Methikkalathile" – Velutha Kathreena
- 1972 – "Ambike Jagadambike" – Theerthayaathra
- 1973 – "Mangalaam Kaavile" – Dharmayudham
- 1982 – "Thushaaramanikal" – Illakkangal
- 1982 – "Palathum Paranju" – Chiriyo Chiri
- 1999 – "Unknown" – Pallavur Devanarayanan

== Television ==
=== Serials ===
- 1997 – Mandan Kunju (Doordarshan)
- 1999 – Kalanum Kandakashani (Doordarshan)
- 2000 – Manasi
- 2001 – Akshayapaathram
- 2001 – Swantham Malootty
- 2002 – Akkarappacha (Asianet)
- Nagamma
- 2004 – Dambathya geethangal (Asianet)
- 2004 – Black and White (Asianet)
- 2005 – Krishnakripaasaagaram (Amrita TV)
- 2005 – Amma (Amrita TV)- Telefilm
- 2006 – Manthrakodi (Asianet)
- 2006 – Sthree 2 (Asianet)
- 2006 – Ponnunjal (Asianet)
- 2007 – Sree Ayappanum Vavarum (Surya TV)
- 2007 – Alilathali (Asianet)
- 2007 – Manassariyathe (Surya TV)
- 2007 – Guruvayoor Sree Krishna Darsanam - Devotional show
- 2008 – Meera (Asianet)
- 2008 – Vishudha Thomasleeha (Asianet)
- 2008 – Gajarajan Guruvayoor Kesavan (Surya TV)
- 2008 – Ammathottil (Asianet)
- 2009 – Chandrettanum Shobedathiyum
- 2009 – Pakal Mazha (Amrita TV)
- 2012 – Ramayanam (Mazhavil Manorama)
- 2012 – Kathayile Rajakumari (Mazhavil Manorama)
- 2016 – Amme Mahamayee (Surya TV)
- 2017 – Thatteem Mutteem (Mazhavil Manorama) – Cameo appearance
- 2018 – Gauri (Surya TV)

=== Other programmes ===
- Home Sweet Home
- JB Junction
- News Hour
- Movies
- Arabian Dreams
- Cinema Diary
- Ponnamma Manassu
- Comedy Super Nite
- Comedy Super Nite 2
- Kathayillithu Jeevitham
- Kayyoppu
- Ponnamma Manssu Thurakkunnu
- Malayalee House
- On Record
- Mukhamukham
- Samagamam
- FM Rainbow
- Badayi Bungalow
- Female Film Festival
- Women in Action programme
- Onam Cooking Show (Kairali We)
- Thiranottam
- Top Talk
- CN Vlogs Onam 2019
- Kayyur Film
- Nithyaharitham Book release
- Ee Vazhitharayil
- Charithram Enniloode
- International Children’s Film Festival of Kerala (ICFFK)
- Mathrusparsham
- KSFDC
- Valthsallyam
- Mothers’ Day programme
- K.G. Jayan Felicitation
- Aanachamayam
- Thombil Palace Samrakshana Samiti Programme
- Lohithadas Award Function
- 65th Hindu Religious Meet
- Interview (Kairali TV)
- Onam Thoughts (Jaihind TV)
- Ammakkorumma
- Amma Ponnamma
- Cinemayile Amma Ponnamma
- Mohanam 2016
- Limelight
- Anjaloonjal
- Attukal festival
- Oru Vattam Koodi
- Stall at Desam
- Children's day Magic Show
- Prem Nazir film festival
- Media Award Presentation
- Swantham Gramam Sundara Gramam
- Amruthageethangal
- Film Supporting Artistes’ Welfare Association
- Good Knight Film and Business Awards 2017
- Annorikkal
- Nere Chovve
- Lal Salam
- Madhuram Madhuram Onam
- Comedy Stars
- Onathammamar
- Star Singer
- Red FM Malayalam Music Awards
- Thanima Cultural Festival
- Ormayile Ponnonam
- JC Daniel Award - Jury
- Katha Ithuvare
- Amma Nakshathram
- Chapter Day
- Mathrumadhuram Onam
- Prem Nazir Foundation Award
- 50 years of Vellithirayile Perunthachan
- Janaseva Sisu Bhavan Snehaveedu
- Honour to IV Sasi
- Minnalai Television Award Night
- Velicham Intensive Educational Development Project
- Vishu Interview (Jaihind TV)
- Run Kerala, Run
- Golden Jubilee celebrations of the formation of the State
- Krishna Jayanthi
- Hiroshima Day Programme
- Jubilee Fete of the Neeravil Prakash Kala Kendram
- Bharathan's 10th death anniversary

== Drama ==
=== As drama actress ===
- Mooladhanam
- Puthiya Akasham Puthiya Bhoomi
- Janani Janmbhoomi
- Doctor

=== As a drama singer ===
- "Vellilam Kaattilolichu Kalikkuvan"
- "Pookkaara Pootharumo" (Doctor)
- "Onappooviliyil" (Mooladhanam)
- "Kaalchilambil" (Mooladhanam)
- "Oru vazhithaarayil" (Althara)
- "Pottichirichu"
- "Mannil Piranna"(Althara)
- "Mulchedikkaattil"(Althara)
- "Vala Vala"(Althara)
- (Yagashala)
- (Maya)

== Albums ==
- Karyasiddhi Pooja
- Ente Malayalam
- Sreeramajapam
- Makam - (Singer)
- Ellam Ente Chottanikkara Amma - (Singer)
- Krishna Krishna Hare Hare - (Singer)

== Advertisements ==
- Sreelakshmi General & Pooja Store Payyoli
- Fawaz Wedding Centre
- Manohar Jewellers
- Kalabhacharthu
- Joy Alukkas Wedding Center
- Santhimadam Villa
- Sreenivas Idli and Dosa Powder
- Mas Curry Powder
- Siva Emu
