= Azhiyatha Bandhangal =

- Directed by: J. Sasikumar
- Screenplay by: S. L. Puram Sadanandan
- Story by: J. Sasikumar
- Produced by: Royal Achenkunju
- Starring: Mohanlal; Shobana; Srividya; Nedumudi Venu
- Cinematography: Vipindas
- Edited by: G. Venkataraman
- Music by: Shyam
- Production company: Royal Pictures
- Distributed by: Royal Pictures
- Release date: 17 November 1985
- Country: India
- Language: Malayalam

Azhiyatha Bandhangal (translation: Unbreakable Bonds) is a 1985 Indian Malayalam-language film directed by J. Sasikumar and written by S. L. Puram Sadanandan from a story by J.Sasikumar. The film stars Mohanlal, Shobana, Srividya, Nedumudi Venu in the lead roles. The film has musical score by Shyam. The film was a commercial success.

== Plot ==
Balakrishnan (Mohanlal), an honest government officer, who relaxes his strict household rules during his disciplinarian mother's absence and falls in love with a new office recruit, Geetha (Shobana). Complications arise when the mother returns and insists that Balakrishnan marry a bride of her own choice.

== Cast ==
- Mohanlal as Balakrishan
- Shobana as Geetha
- Srividya as Vasundhara Menon
- Nedumudi Venu as Unnikrishnan
- Sumithra as sulochana
- Prathapachandran as Achuthan Nair
- Thikkurissy Sukumaran Nair as Thampi
- Bahadoor as Easwara Pillai
- Jagathy Sreekumar as Sugunachandran
- Meena as Rajalakshmi
- Aranmula Ponnamma as Meenakshi

== Soundtrack ==
The music was composed by Shyam and the lyrics were written by O. N. V. Kurup. According to lyricist K. Jayakumar, the song "Karukathan Kaiviral" was written while thinking about the plot of Kunjattakilikal (1986).

No.	Song	Singers	Lyrics
1	"Etho Vasantha Nishwaasamo"	K. J. Yesudas	O. N. V. Kurup
2	"Maanmizhi Thenmozhi"	K. J. Yesudas, K. S. Chithra	O. N. V. Kurup
3	"Karukathan Kaiviral"	Ambilikkuttan	O. N. V. Kurup
