= Manasiloru Manimuthu =

- Theatrical release poster
- Directed by: J. Sasikumar
- Screenplay by: S. L. Puram Sadanandan
- Story by: J. Sasikumar
- Produced by: Royal Achankunju
- Starring: Mohanlal; Suresh Gopi; Urvashi; Sankaradi
- Cinematography: Vipin Das
- Edited by: G. Venkittaraman
- Music by: Shyam; Johnson (Score)
- Production company: Royal Movies
- Distributed by: Royal Release
- Release date: 21 September 1986
- Country: India
- Language: Malayalam

Manasiloru Manimuthu (transl. A bell pearl in mind) is a 1986 Indian Malayalam-language drama film directed by J. Sasikumar and written by S. L. Puram Sadanandan from a story by Sasikumar, produced by Royal Achankunju. The film stars Mohanlal, Suresh Gopi, Urvashi and Sankaradi. The film's songs were composed by Shyam, while the background score was provided by Johnson.

The narrative centers around Mohan (portrayed by Mohanlal), a wealthy individual known for his flawed personality. He falls in love with a woman (played by Urvashi), who ultimately marries another man (played by Suresh Gopi), and they have a child together. Tragedy strikes when Suresh Gopi's character is murdered, and Mohan becomes the prime suspect in the eyes of the community. The film unfolds as a drama exploring themes of love, jealousy, and the quest for justice.

== Cast ==
- Mohanlal
- Suresh Gopi
- Urvashi
- Sankaradi
- Jagathy Sreekumar
- Vijayaraghavan
- K. P. Ummer
- Thikkurissy Sukumaran Nair
- Meena
- Kaviyoor Ponnamma
- Babitha
- Baby Adheena
- Devi
- Raji
- Mythili
