= Swanthamevide Bandhamevide =

1985 Indian film

Swanthamevide? Bandhamevide?
- Poster designed by Gayathri Ashokan
- Directed by: J. Sasikumar
- Screenplay by: S. L. Puram Sadanandan
- Story by: J. Sasikumar
- Based on: Thommante Makkal (1965) by J. Sasikumar
- Produced by: Royal Achankunju; Josekutty Cherupushpam
- Starring: Mohanlal; Lalu Alex; Jagathy Sreekumar; Swapna; Menaka; Jose Prakash; Sonia; Meenakumari
- Cinematography: C. Ramachandra Menon
- Edited by: G. Venkittaraman
- Music by: Johnson
- Production company: Royal Pictures
- Distributed by: Royal & Cherupushpam Release
- Release date: 4 March 1984
- Country: India
- Language: Malayalam

Swanthamevide? Bandhamevide? (transl. Where is kinship? Where is relationship?) is a 1984 Indian Malayalam-language family drama film directed by J. Sasikumar and written by S. L. Puram Sadanandan from a story by Sasikumar. It is a remake of Sasikumar's 1965 film Thommante Makkal in which Kaviyoor Ponnamma reprised her role. The film stars Mohanlal, Jose Prakash, Swapna, Lalu Alex, Menaka, and Adoor Bhasi. It features music composed by Johnson. The plot follows the issues that arise in a family after the marriage of two sons.

== Plot ==
Madhavan Nair, a lorry driver, is loyal and honest to his master Keshava Panicker. In return, Panicker offers him a lorry, and a house in which to stay along with his family consisting of Lakshmi, his wife and two sons. With time, Madhavan Nair turns into a rich businessman who owns several buses, automobile workshops, and trucks. Balachandran, his elder son runs his business, while Rajendran, younger son is of carefree nature, who is also in his final years in college.

Rajendran falls in love with Usha, Panicker's daughter, while Balachandran is in love with Indu, daughter of Varma, an old feudal family, who had lost all his wealth with time. With the consent of parents, both Rajendran and Balachandran marry and their hearts throb. But life turns more troublesome after the marriage.

Both Indu and Usha get into petty quarrels leading to serious clashes inside the house. Things even get out of hand with both the brothers getting into physical fights in front of the parents. In such a fight between Rajendran and Balan, Madhavan Nair and Lakshmi interfere, but accidentally, the blow hit on Lakshmi's head, leading to her death, shocking everyone.

== Cast ==
- Mohanlal as Rajendran, Madhavan Nair's Younger Son
- Swapna as Usha Paniker, Rajendran's wife
- Lalu Alex as Balachandran, Madhavan Nair's Elder Son
- Menaka as Indulekha, Balachandran's wife
- Jose Prakash as Madhavan Nair
- Kaviyoor Ponnamma as Leshmi, Madhavan Nair's wife
- Jagathy Sreekumar as Gopakumar, Madhavan Nair's Son in law
- Anu (Babitha) as Madhavan Nair's Daughter and Gopakumar's Wife
- Adoor Bhasi as Keshava Paniker, Usha's Father
- Meena as Bhagirathi, Ushas's mother
- Kundara Johnny as Sreedharan
- M. S. Thripunithura as Indu's father
- Sukumari as Indu's Mother
- Kollam G. K. Pillai as Sankara Pillai

== Soundtrack ==
The songs were composed by Johnson and the lyrics were by Poovachal Khader.

Swanthamevide Bandhamevide (Original Motion Picture Soundtrack)
No.	Title	Singer(s)	Length
1.	"Amrithum Kulirum"	K. J. Yesudas	4:25
2.	"Oro Thazhvaravum"	P. Jayachandran, Vani Jairam	4:20
3.	"Odi Odi Odi Vannu Njan"	J. M. Raju, Vani Jairam	4:16
4.	"Shapamo Ee Bhavanam"	K. J. Yesudas	4:25

== Box office ==
The film was a commercial success at the box office. It was one among the most successful films of Sasikumar.
