= Kunjattakilikal =

- Poster
- Directed by: J. Sasikumar
- Screenplay by: S. L. Puram Sadanandan
- Story by: Prekshaka
- Produced by: Prem Prakash; N. J. Siriac; Thomas Kora
- Starring: Mohanlal; Shobana; M. G. Soman; Sukumari
- Cinematography: C. E. Babu
- Edited by: G. Venkittaraman
- Music by: A. J. Joseph; Johnson (Score)
- Production company: Prekshaka Films
- Distributed by: Century Release
- Release date: 6 April 1986
- Country: India
- Language: Malayalam

Kunjattakilikal (transl. Old World sparrows) is a 1986 Indian Malayalam-language family drama film directed by J. Sasikumar and written by S. L. Puram Sadanandan. The film stars Mohanlal, Shobana, M. G. Soman, and Sukumari. It features songs composed by A. J. Joseph and background score by Johnson.

== Plot ==
Balakrishnan brings his cousin Ramachandran's four children to Ramchandran's father's home after the demise of Ramachandran and his wife in an accident. Since Ramachandran married his father's watchman's daughter, his father asked him to leave the house. At first, Vishwanatha Menon refuses to accept the children, but he changes his mind and decides to care for them. He arranges a home tutor for the kids. Over time, Balakrishnan falls in love with the children's tutor, Usha. When Usha takes the children for a picnic without Menon's permission, he sacks her. He then realizes that the kids and Balakrishnan love her and calls her back. Usha's parents assume that Menon wants to marry Usha, when he goes to pick Usha up from her house. They are greedy at the thought of their daughter marrying the millionaire Menon. Usha leaves Menon's house when she learns about her parents' plan to fix her wedding with Menon. But Menon stops her and arranges for her marriage with Balakrishnan.

== Cast ==
- Mohanlal as Balakrishnan
- Shobana as Usha
- M. G. Soman as Vishwanatha Menon
- Sukumari as Kamalamma
- Mala Aravindan as Panikkar
- Thilakan as Ayyappan Nair
- V. D. Rajappan as Dasappan
- Meena as Bhageerathi
- Alummoodan as Discipline d'Cruz
- Thodupuzha Vasanthi as Madhavi

== Soundtrack ==
The music was composed by A. J. Joseph, and the lyrics were written by K. Jayakumar.

No.	Song	Singers	Lyrics	Length
1	"Aakaashaganga"	K. S. Chithra	K. Jayakumar	
2	"Ee Ponnu Pootha Kaadukalil"	S. Janaki, Chorus	K. Jayakumar	
3	"Ormavekkaan Oru Divasam"	Chorus, Valsa	K. Jayakumar	
4	"Prabhaatham Vidarnnu"	K. J. Yesudas	K. Jayakumar	
