= Thommante Makkal =

1965 Indian film

- Directed by: J. Sasikumar
- Written by: J. Sasikumar; P. J. Antony (dialogues)
- Produced by: V. P. M. Manickam; M. S. Kasi
- Starring: Sathyan; Madhu; Sheela; Kottarakkara Sreedharan Nair; Kaviyoor Ponnamma
- Cinematography: W. R. Subbarao; N. Karthikeyan
- Edited by: A. Thankaraj
- Music by: M. S. Baburaj
- Production company: Bhagavathy Pictures
- Distributed by: Thirumeni Pictures
- Release date: 24 December 1965
- Country: India
- Language: Malayalam

Thommante Makkal (transl. Children of Thomman) is a 1965 Indian Malayalam-language comedy-drama film written and directed by J. Sasikumar, with dialogues by P. J. Antony. The film stars Sathyan, Madhu, Sheela and Kaviyoor Ponnamma, and was the debut of Shobha Mohan as a child artist. It featured a musical score by M. S. Baburaj.

The film was successful at the box office. Sasikumar remade it in 1984 as Swanthamevide Bandhamevide.

== Cast ==
- Sathyan as Pappachan
- Madhu as Kunjachan
- Ambika as Shoshamma
- Sheela as Marykutty
- Kottarakkara Sreedharan Nair as Thomachan
- Kaviyoor Ponnamma as Achamma, Thomachan's wife
- Adoor Bhasi as Ousephachan
- Adoor Pankajam as Oromma
- K. S. Gopinath as James
- Nilumbur Ayisha as Shoshamma's mother
- Joseph Chacko as Kapyar
- Raadha as Chinnamma, Thomachan's daughter
- Shobha Mohan as Young Chinnama/Child Artist

== Soundtrack ==
The music was composed by M. S. Baburaj and the lyrics were written by Vayalar Ramavarma and Varghese Maliyekkal.

No.	Song	Singers	Lyrics	Length (m:ss)
1	"Aadyaraathri Madhuvidhu"	K. J. Yesudas	Vayalar Ramavarma	
2	"Angane Angane En Karal"	K. J. Yesudas, S. Janaki	Vayalar Ramavarma	
3	"Chekuthaan Kayariya"	K. J. Yesudas	Vayalar Ramavarma	
4	"Kocheekkaarathi"	P. B. Sreenivas, K. P. Udayabhanu	Vayalar Ramavarma	
5	"Nillu Nillu Naanakkudukkakale"	S. Janaki, P. Leela, P. B. Sreenivas, K. P. Udayabhanu	Vayalar Ramavarma	
6	"Njaanurangaan Pokum"	S. Janaki	Varghese Maliyekkal	
7	"Njaanurangaan Pokum" [Pathos][Bit]	S. Janaki	Varghese Maliyekkal	

== Reception ==
The film was a commercial success at the box office. The film was remade in 1984 as Swanthamevide Bandhamevide by Sasikumar.
