= Vivahasammanam =

Indian film by J.D. Thottan

- Directed by: J. D. Thottan
- Written by: S. K. Marar; S. L. Puram Sadanandan (dialogues)
- Screenplay by: S. L. Puram Sadanandan
- Starring: Prem Nazir; Sheela; Kaviyoor Ponnamma; Adoor Bhasi
- Edited by: V. P. Krishnan
- Music by: G. Devarajan
- Production company: Aruna Productions
- Distributed by: Aruna Productions
- Release date: 1 October 1971
- Country: India
- Language: Malayalam

Vivahasammanam (lit. 'Wedding gift') is a 1971 Indian Malayalam-language film, directed by J. D. Thottan. The film stars Prem Nazir, Sheela, Kaviyoor Ponnamma and Adoor Bhasi. The film had musical score by G. Devarajan.

== Cast ==
- Prem Nazir as Kannankutty Nair
- Sheela as Gourikkutty
- Kaviyoor Ponnamma as Parukuttyamma
- Adoor Bhasi as Kunjiraman Nair
- Thikkurissy Sukumaran Nair as Thahasildar
- Prema as Thahasildar's wife
- T. S. Muthaiah as Panikker
- Alummoodan as Achuthan
- K. P. Ummer as Madhavankutty
- Meena as Madhavi
- Rani Chandra as Sundari
- Sadhana as Meenakshi
- T. K. Balachandran as Velukutty Nair
- Muthukulam as Valyammavan
- Vanchiyoor Radha as Cheriyamma
- P. R. Menon as Raman Nair

== Soundtrack ==
The music was composed by G. Devarajan and the lyrics were written by Vayalar Ramavarma.

No.	Song	Singers	Lyrics	Length (m:ss)
1	"Ambarathi Chembrathi"	P. Madhuri	Vayalar Ramavarma	
2	"Kaalam Sharathkaalam"	A. M. Rajah, Chorus	Vayalar Ramavarma	
3	"Mohabhangangal"	K. J. Yesudas	Vayalar Ramavarma	
4	"Veenedam Vishnulokam"	K. J. Yesudas	Vayalar Ramavarma	
5	"Velutha Vaavinekkaal"	K. J. Yesudas	Vayalar Ramavarma	
