= Kavitha (1973 film) =

- Directed by: Vijaya Nirmala
- Written by: A. Sheriff
- Screenplay by: A. Sheriff
- Starring: Kaviyoor Ponnamma; Adoor Bhasi; Thikkurissy Sukumaran Nair; K. P. Ummer
- Cinematography: Gopi Krishna
- Edited by: Gopal
- Music by: K. Raghavan
- Production company: Sangamam Pictures
- Distributed by: Sangamam Pictures
- Release date: 13 April 1973
- Country: India
- Language: Malayalam

Kavitha is a 1973 Indian Malayalam-language film, directed by Vijaya Nirmala. The film stars Kaviyoor Ponnamma, Adoor Bhasi, Thikkurissy Sukumaran Nair and K. P. Ummer. The film had musical score by K. Raghavan.This is the first film to be directed by a female director in the history of Malayalam cinema.

== Cast ==
- Kaviyoor Ponnamma
- Adoor Bhasi
- Thikkurissy Sukumaran Nair
- K. P. Ummer
- Meena
- Vijayanirmala
- Vincent

== Soundtrack ==
The music was composed by K. Raghavan and the lyrics were written by P. Bhaskaran and Poovachal Khader.

No.	Song	Singers	Lyrics	Length (m:ss)
1	"Aadam Ente Appooppan"	P. Susheela, S. P. Balasubrahmanyam	P. Bhaskaran	
2	"Abalakalennum"	P. Susheela	P. Bhaskaran	
3	"Kaalamaam Ozhukkuthilurumbaay"	P. Susheela	Poovachal Khader	
4	"Kaayalkkaattinte Thalam"	K. J. Yesudas	P. Bhaskaran	
5	"Nischalam Kidapporeejalam"	P. Susheela	Poovachal Khader	
6	"Pinneyum Vaalmeekangal"	K. J. Yesudas	Poovachal Khader	
7	"Swapnangal Neettum Kumbil"	K. J. Yesudas	Poovachal Khader	
8	"Swargathil Vilakku Vakkum"	P. Susheela	P. Bhaskaran	
9	"Vaaridhi Vaanine Pulkumee"	P. Susheela	Poovachal Khader	
10	"Vettanaaykkalal Choozhum"	P. Susheela	Poovachal Khader	
