= Ponmudy (film) =

- Directed by: N. Sankaran Nair
- Written by: N. Sankaran Nair; K. T. Muhammad (dialogues)
- Screenplay by: K. T. Muhammad
- Produced by: TP Bava, Anwar Creations
- Starring: Prem Nazir; Sharada; Divya; Sankaradi
- Cinematography: Vipin Das
- Edited by: K. Sankunni
- Music by: Jithin Shyam
- Production company: Anwar Creations
- Distributed by: Munavar Films
- Release date: 30 July 1982
- Country: India
- Language: Malayalam

Ponmudy is a 1982 Indian Malayalam-language film, directed by N. Sankaran Nair. Produced by TP Bava of Anwar Creations. The film stars Prem Nazir, Sharada, Divya and Sankaradi. The film's score was composed by Jithin Shyam.

== Cast ==
- Prem Nazir as Divakaran
- Sharada as Madhavi
- Sankaradi as Keshavan
- Raghavan as Gopi
- Kuttyedathi Vilasini as Radhamma
- Meena as Karthu
- Mohan as Raju
- Nellikode Bhaskaran as Bhaskaran
- Paravana Abdulrahman
- Sharmila as Vidhu
- Divya
- Kallara Sasi

== Soundtrack ==
The music was composed by Jithin Shyam with lyrics by Balu Kiriyath and Perumpuzha Gopalakrishnan.

No.	Song	Singers	Lyrics	Length (m:ss)
1	"Doore Neerunna"	S. Janaki	Balu Kiriyath	
2	"Jaladevathe Unaraan Neramaay"	K. J. Yesudas	Balu Kiriyath	
3	"Kilukilukkam Kaattil"	S/ Janaki, Babu	Perumpuzha Gopalakrishnan	
4	"Vidaruvaan Vithumbumee"	Vani Jairam	Balu Kiriyath	
