= Jeevithayaathra =

Malayalam film

- Poster
- Directed by: J. Sasikumar
- Screenplay by: K. P. Kottarakkara
- Produced by: K. P. Kottarakkara
- Starring: Prem Nazir; Madhu; Sheela; Ambika; Sukumari; Adoor Bhasi
- Music by: P. S. Divakar
- Production company: Ganesh Pictures
- Distributed by: Ganesh Pictures
- Release date: 2 September 1965
- Country: India
- Language: Malayalam

Jeevithayaathra (transl. Journey of Life) is a 1965 Indian Malayalam-language film, directed by J. Sasikumar and written and produced by K. P. Kottarakkara. The film stars Prem Nazir, Madhu, Sheela, Ambika, Sukumari and Adoor Bhasi. The film had musical score by P. S. Divakar.

== Cast ==
- Prem Nazir as Venu/Minnal Ramu
- Madhu as Rajan
- Sheela as Radha
- Ambika as Lakshmi
- Sukumari as Vasanthy
- Adoor Bhasi as Madhavan
- Bahadoor as Kochappan
- S. P. Pillai as Ring master
- Kunchan
- Thikkurissy Sukumaran Nair as Parameshwara Kurup/Venu's father
- Sobha as Meena
- Friend Ramaswamy as Menon
- Prathapachandran as Registrar
- Pattom Sadan (Uncredited)
- Kottayam Chellappan as Police Inspector
- M.G Menon
- R. Viswanathan
- Baby Rajani

== Soundtrack ==
The music was composed by P. S. Divakar and the lyrics were written by Abhayadev and P. Bhaskaran.

No.	Song	Singers	Lyrics	Length (m:ss)
1	"Achhane Aadyamaay" (Bit)	P. Leela	Abhayadev	
2	"Azhakin Neelakkadal"	L. R. Eeswari	P. Bhaskaran	2.38
3	"Kilivaathilin Idayilkkoodi"	L. R. Eeswari	P. Bhaskaran	2.42
4	"Parayatte Njan"	P. Susheela, Kamukara	P. Bhaskaran	
5	"Pattiniyaal Pallaykkullil"	S. Janaki, Kamukara, Zero Babu	P. Bhaskaran	
6	"Thankakkudame Urangoo"	K. J. Yesudas, P. Leela	Abhayadev	
