= Ormayil Nee Maathram =

- Directed by: J. Sasikumar
- Written by: S. L. Puram Sadanandan
- Screenplay by: S. L. Puram Sadanandan
- Produced by: R. Devarajan
- Starring: Prem Nazir; Seema; Sathar; Reena
- Cinematography: C. Ramachandra Menon
- Music by: G. Devarajan
- Production company: Sreevardhini Productions
- Distributed by: Sreevardhini Productions
- Release date: 10 August 1979
- Country: India
- Language: Malayalam

Ormayil Nee Maathram is a 1979 Indian Malayalam-language film, directed by J. Sasikumar and produced by R. Devarajan. The film stars Prem Nazir, Seema, Sathar and Reena in the lead roles. The film has musical score by G. Devarajan.

== Cast ==
- Prem Nazir as Suresh
- Jayabharathi as Shanthi
- Sathar as Babu
- Priyamvada as Sreedevi
- Sudheesh as Chandhran

== Soundtrack ==
The music was composed by G. Devarajan with lyrics by Yusufali Kechery.

No.	Song	Singers	Lyrics	Length (m:ss)
1	"Mundirichaarinu Lahariyundo"	P. Madhuri	Yusufali Kechery	
2	"Paathiraavin Neelayamuna"	K. J. Yesudas	Yusufali Kechery	
3	"Sneham Daivam Ezhuthiya"	P. Susheela, Raju Felix	Yusufali Kechery	
