= Rahasyam (1969 film) =

- Theatrical release poster
- Directed by: J. Sasikumar
- Written by: K. P. Kottarakkara
- Screenplay by: K. P. Kottarakkara
- Produced by: K. P. Kottarakkara
- Starring: Prem Nazir; Sheela; Jayabharathi; Adoor Bhasi
- Cinematography: P. B. Mani
- Edited by: T. R. Sreenivasalu
- Music by: B. A. Chidambaranath
- Production company: Ganesh Pictures
- Distributed by: Ganesh Pictures
- Release date: 20 March 1969
- Country: India
- Language: Malayalam

Rahasyam (transl. Secret) is a 1969 Indian Malayalam-language film directed by J. Sasikumar and produced by K. P. Kottarakkara. The film stars Prem Nazir, Sheela, Jayabharathi and Adoor Bhasi in the lead roles. The film has musical score by B. A. Chidambaranath.

== Cast ==
- Prem Nazir as Babu & CID K. K. Nair (Double Role)
- Sheela as Ammini
- Jayabharathi as Sulochana
- Adoor Bhasi as Shankaran
- Jose Prakash as Damodaran
- C. R. Lakshmi
- Friend Ramaswamy
- K. P. Ummer as Prasad
- Leela
- Meena as Mrs. Shyamala Thambi
- N. Govindankutty as Dance Master Govindankutty
- Paravoor Bharathan as Vikraman

== Soundtrack ==
The music was composed by B. A. Chidambaranath and the lyrics were written by Sreekumaran Thampi.

No.	Song	Singers	Lyrics	Length (m:ss)
1	"Aayiram Kunnukalkkappurath"	S. Janaki	Sreekumaran Thampi	
2	"Hum To Pyar Karne Aaye"	P. Jayachandran, B. Vasantha, C. O. Anto	Sreekumaran Thampi	
3	"Mazhavillu Kondo"	P. Leela	Sreekumaran Thampi	
4	"Mazhavillukondo Bit"	P. Leela	Sreekumaran Thampi	
5	"Thottaal Veezhunna Praayam"	Kamukara	Sreekumaran Thampi	
6	"Urangan Vaikiya"	K. J. Yesudas	Sreekumaran Thampi	
