= Padmaragam =

- Directed by: J. Sasikumar
- Written by: Sreekumaran Thampi (dialogues)
- Screenplay by: Sreekumaran Thampi
- Produced by: V. M. Chandi
- Starring: Prem Nazir; Jayabharathi; Kaviyoor Ponnamma; Adoor Bhasi
- Cinematography: J. G. Vijayam
- Edited by: V. P. Krishnan
- Music by: M. K. Arjunan
- Production company: MS Productions
- Distributed by: MS Productions
- Release date: 14 November 1975
- Country: India
- Language: Malayalam

Padmaragam is a 1975 Indian Malayalam-language film, directed by J. Sasikumar and produced by V. M. Chandi. The film stars Prem Nazir, Jayabharathi, Kaviyoor Ponnamma and Adoor Bhasi. The film has musical score by M. K. Arjunan.

== Cast ==
- Prem Nazir
- Jayabharathi
- Kaviyoor Ponnamma
- Adoor Bhasi
- Thikkurissy Sukumaran Nair
- Sreelatha Namboothiri
- T. R. Omana
- Bahadoor
- K. P. Ummer

== Soundtrack ==
The music was composed by M. K. Arjunan with lyrics by Sreekumaran Thampi.

No.	Song	Singers	Lyrics	Length (m:ss)
1	"Kaattuvannu Thottaneram"	K. J. Yesudas, Vani Jairam	Sreekumaran Thampi	
2	"Malayalam Beauty"	K. P. Brahmanandan, Sreelatha Namboothiri	Sreekumaran Thampi	
3	"Poonilaave Vaa"	S. Janaki	Sreekumaran Thampi	
4	"Saandhyatharake"	K. J. Yesudas	Sreekumaran Thampi	
5	"Sindhunadee Theerathu"	K. J. Yesudas, B. Vasantha, Chorus	Sreekumaran Thampi	
6	"Urangaan Kidannaal"	K. J. Yesudas	Sreekumaran Thampi	
7	"Ushassaam Swarnathaamara"	K. J. Yesudas	Sreekumaran Thampi	
