= Nivedyam (1978 film) =

- Directed by: J. Sasikumar
- Written by: Joseph Anand; S. L. Puram Sadanandan (dialogues)
- Screenplay by: S. L. Puram Sadanandan
- Starring: Prem Nazir; KR Vijaya; KP Ummer; MG Soman
- Cinematography: M. C. Sekhar
- Edited by: K. Sankunni
- Music by: G. Devarajan
- Production company: Make-up Movies
- Distributed by: Make-up Movies
- Release date: 18 August 1978
- Country: India
- Language: Malayalam

Nivedyam is a 1978 Indian Malayalam-language film, directed by J. Sasikumar. The film stars Prem Nazir, KR Vijaya, KP Ummer and MG Soman in the lead roles. The film has musical score by G. Devarajan.

== Cast ==
- Prem Nazir
- K. P. Ummer
- K. R. Vijaya
- M. G. Soman
- Adoor Bhasi
- Sankaradi
- Sreelatha Namboothiri
- Unnimary

== Soundtrack ==
The music was composed by G. Devarajan and the lyrics were written by Sreekumaran Thampi, Mankombu Gopalakrishnan, Yusufali Kechery and Chirayinkeezhu Ramakrishnan Nair.

No.	Song	Singers	Lyrics	Length (m:ss)
1	"Ammathan"	P. Madhuri	Sreekumaran Thampi	
2	"Kavilathenikkoru"	P. Jayachandran, Vani Jairam	Mankombu Gopalakrishnan	
3	"Mini Skirtkaari"	P. Jayachandran	Yusufali Kechery	
4	"Paadasaram Aniyunna"	K. J. Yesudas, P. Madhuri	Chirayinkeezhu Ramakrishnan Nair	
