= Bhaaryayum Kaamukiyum =

1978 film

- Directed by: J. Sasikumar
- Written by: Thrilok Chandar; Pappanamkodu Lakshmanan (dialogues)
- Screenplay by: Pappanamkodu Lakshmanan
- Starring: Prem Nazir; Sheela; Adoor Bhasi; Sreelatha Namboothiri
- Cinematography: C. J. Mohan
- Edited by: K. Sankunni
- Music by: M. K. Arjunan
- Production company: Shanmukharatna Films
- Distributed by: Shanmukharatna Films
- Release date: 9 June 1978
- Country: India
- Language: Malayalam

Bhaaryayum Kaamukiyum is a 1978 Indian Malayalam film, directed by J. Sasikumar. The film stars Prem Nazir, Sheela, Adoor Bhasi and Sreelatha Namboothiri in the lead roles. The film has musical score by M. K. Arjunan.

== Cast ==
- Prem Nazir
- Sheela
- Adoor Bhasi
- Sreelatha Namboothiri
- K. R. Vijaya
- Meena
- Nellikode Bhaskaran

== Soundtrack ==
The music was composed by M. K. Arjunan and the lyrics were written by Chirayinkeezhu Ramakrishnan Nair and Sreekumaran Thampi.

No.	Song	Singers	Lyrics	Length (m:ss)
1	"Kaadinakam Nadane"	P. Jayachandran	Chirayinkeezhu Ramakrishnan Nair	
2	"Nizhal Veezhthiyodunna"	K. J. Yesudas	Sreekumaran Thampi	
3	"Ponnum Thenum Chaalicha"	K. J. Yesudas	Sreekumaran Thampi	
