= J. Sasikumar =

Indian film director (1927-2014)

- Born: N. V. John; 14 October 1927; Alappuzha, Kerala, India
- Died: 17 July 2014 (aged 86); Kochi, Kerala
- Occupations: Director, actor, writer
- Years active: 1957–1990
- Spouse: Thresiamma

Nambiathusseril Varkey John (14 October 1927 – 17 July 2014), better known by his screen name Sasikumar, was an Indian film director who worked in Malayalam cinema. He has directed more than 141 films in his career which began in the mid-1960s. He is often referred to as Hitmaker Sasikumar due to the commercial success of his films. In 2012, he was awarded the J. C. Daniel Award, Kerala government's highest honour for contributions to Malayalam cinema

Sasikumar holds record for directing most films (141) after Telugu film director Dasari Narayana Rao (151), most films having the same actor as hero Prem Nazir in 84 films and the most films directed in a year, 15 films in 1977. He died in 2014 at the age of 86.

== Early life ==
He was born on 14 October 1927 to Mariya and N. L. Varkey of the Nambiathusseril family in Allappuzha, Kerala. He had displayed a great flair for acting in dramas even when he was a boy of 10. He completed his school education from Leo Thirteenth High school, Alleppey and St. Ephrem's School, Mannanam. During his college life he had represented Kerala University football team. He passed out as a graduate in economics from Sacred Hearts College, Thevara.

== Career ==
=== Early work ===
During his studies in the schools and colleges, he had acted in dramas of the Shakespearean genre. Later on, Kunchacko of Udaya Studios, Alleppey, identified his talent and gave him a role to act in his film Visappinte Vili in which he acted as villain against the Evergreen Hero, Prem Nazir. This happened to be the first film in Malayalam in which a villain fights with the hero without a dupe and that role was performed with aplomb by Sasikumar. Subsequently, in addition to acting in several films produced by Udaya Studios he worked as the assistant director of Kunchacko in those films.

Later on, he joined Merryland Studios, owned by the veteran director-producer P. Subramaniam. It was under his tutelage that Sasikumar was transformed into a great director. While in Merryland he worked with many renowned actors of that time, including T. K. Balachandran, Prem Nazir and Thikkurissy Sukumaran Nair. He worked as associate director to P. Subramaniam in addition to acting in some roles himself. Sasikumar still considers P.Subramanyam as a fatherly icon who had showered upon him fatherly affection and regards during his tenure at Merryland. The first independent film directed by Sasikumar was a documentary, namely ONAKKAZHCHA for Fertilisers and Chemicals Travancore Limited (FACT) regarding the use and effectiveness of fertilizers in agriculture.

=== Peak years ===
Following the advice of his friend Prem Nazir, Sasikumar went to Chennai in the 1960s. He directed Thommante Makkal and Porter Kunjali for Thomas Pictures in 1965. He also directed, along with P. A. Thomas, the movie Kudumbini (1964) for Thomas Pictures, which received a Certificate of Merit at the annual National Film Awards. Subsequently, he directed an art film, Kavalam Chundan, which was a flop. As a result, a dejected Sasikumar decided to give up film direction and return to Kerala to join his father's oil mill business. It was Prem Nazir who encouraged him to return to Chennai where he directed the commercial film Jeevitha Yaathra which became a major hit. After this, Sasikumar understood that he could not make an art film like Kavalam Chundan with producers' money. But after his change of style from art to commercial films he never looked back.

Along with Prem Nazir he helped many producers who had lost their land and jewellery through movie production. Sathyan, Prem Nazir, Adoor Bhasi, S. P. Pillai, Madhu, Jose Prakash, Sheela, Vijayasree, K.R.Vijaya, Sharada, Vidhubala, Lakshmi, Sreelatha, Jayabharathi, Sreevidya, Nanditha Bose, Unni Mary, Kamal Haasan, Mammootty, Sukumaran, Soman, Ravikumar, Jayan, Vincent, Sobhana, Shankar, Mohanlal and Suresh Gopi all acted in his films. Kaviyoor Ponnamma, who had acted in the role of a mother in his old movie Thommante Makkal which had a story with a Christian background acted in the same movie, remade with a Hindu background and retitled Swanthamevide Banthamevide taking the same role after 25 years. Some years later, Sasikumar remade the same movie under the title "Raja Vazhcha". It was Sasikumar who introduced a new sophisticated villain to the Malayalam film world in the form of "Silver Head" enacted by Jose Prakash in Love in Kerala (1968). During his long career in film he has directed more than 140 films in Malayalam and one film in Tamil. The trio consisting of Sasikumar, Sreekumaran Thampi and M.K Arjunan was the rage of the period 1969–1980.

=== Acting ===
Sasikumar acted in small roles in films like Thiramala, Sreerama Pattabhishekam, Velakkaran, Thommante Makkal, Seetha, Snehadeepam, Umma, Bhakta Kuchela, Snapaka Yohannan, Kattumaina, Visappinte Vili, Oral Koodi Kallanayi etc. He has also written the story, cinema script and dialogue for many of his films.

== Collaborators ==
Sasikumar launched the career of Malayalam film music composer Ravindran with his film Choola. The Malayalam music director M. K. Arjunan became popular after scoring music for Sasikumar's movie Rest House. Other films had music by other well-known composers – Devarajan, A. T. Ummer, Salil Chowdhury, Shyam, Johnson and M. S. Viswanathan. His lyricists included Vayalar Rama Varma, Sreekumaran Thampy, O. N. V. Kurup, P. Bhaskaran and K. Jayakumar, but Sreekumaran Thampy has been the lyricist in most of his films. All the songs in his film Devadasi of which the music was scored by Salil Chowdhury became great hits even though the film was not released on account of some problems with its producer, Adoor Padmakumar.

Senthil, the comedian in Tamil cinema, was introduced to film audiences through the film "Ithikkara Pakki" and Jagathy Sreekumar, a comedian in Malayalam cinema, made his film debut with "Chattambi Kalyani". Sasikumar introduced Jayabharathi to Malayalam cinema through his film "Pen Makkal". Several of his assistants, including P. G. Viswambharan, G. Prem Kumar, Crossbelt Mani, Baby, Thampi Kannanthanam, and Asokan, later became independent film directors. Several artists who worked with or received support from Sasikumar later received national recognition and many awards. Sasikumar's films were noted for their appeal to contemporary audiences and reflected popular themes of their period.

== World records ==
- Maximum number of films directed by any director: 141
- Maximum number of films having the same actor as hero : 84 (Prem Nazir)
- Maximum number of films directed in a year by any director in world cinema : 15 films in 1977

The Kerala state Government honoured him in the year 2013 by conferring on him the coveted J. C. Daniel Award for his manifold contributions to the Malayalam cinema.

== Death ==
Sasikumar died at Lakeshore Hospital in Kochi on 17 July 2014 at the age of 87. He was buried according to Christian rites at St. Michael's Church Alappuzha, his home-town, on 19 July. He is survived by two daughters. His wife Thresiamma and son Shaji predeceased him, both in 2009.

== Filmography ==
1. Kudumbini (1964 Sasikumar and P. A. Thomas)
2. Jeevitha Yaathra (1965)
3. Thommante Makkal (1965)
4. Porter Kunjali (1965)
5. Pennmakkal (1966)
6. Koottukar (1966)
7. Kanmanikal (1966)
8. Kavalam Chundan (1967)
9. Balyakalasakhi (1967)
10. Vidyarthi (1968)
11. Velutha Kathreena (1968)
12. Love in Kerala (1968)
13. Rest House (1969)
14. Rahasyam (1969)
15. Rakthapushpam (1970)
16. Lanka Dahanam (1971)
17. Bobanum Moliyum (1971)
18. Pushpanjali (1972)
19. Maravil Thirivu Sookshikkuka (1972)
20. Brahmachari (1972)
21. Anveshanam (1972)
22. Thiruvabharanam (1973)
23. Thekkan Kattu (1973)
24. Thaniniram (1973)
25. Panchavadi (1973)
26. Padmavyooham (1973)
27. Interview (1973)
28. Divyadharsanam (1973)
29. Sethu Bandhanam (1974)
30. Poonthenaruvi (1974)
31. Pancha Thanthram (1974)
32. Night Duty (1974)
33. Sindhu (1975)
34. Sammanam (1975)
35. Pulivalu (1975)
36. Pravaham (1975)
37. Picnic (1975)
38. Palaazhi Madhanam (1975)
39. Padmaragam (1975)
40. Chattambi Kalyani (1975)
41. Alibabayum 41 Kallanmaarum (1975)
42. Abhimaanam (1975)
43. Aaranya Kaandum (1975)
44. Swimming Pool (1976)
45. Pushpa Sarem (1976)
46. Pickpocket (1976)
47. Kayamkulam Kochunniyude Maghan (1976)
48. Kamadhenu (1976)
49. Amrudha Vahini (1976)
50. Ajayanum Vijayanum (1976)
51. Vishukkani (1977)
52. Varadhakshina (1977)
53. Thuruppu Gulam (1977)
54. Saghakkale Munottu (1977)
55. Rathi Manmathan (1977)
56. Randu Lokam (1977)
57. Parivarthanam (1977)
58. Panchamrutham (1977)
59. Muttathe Mulla (1977)
60. Mohavum Mukthiyum (1977)
61. Mini Mol (1977)
62. Lakshmi (1977)
63. Chathur Vedam (1977)
64. Aparaajitha (1977)
65. Akshaya Paathram (1977)
66. Sathru Samharam (1978)
67. Nivedhyam (1978)
68. Ninakku Njanum Enikku Neeyum (1978)
69. Mukkuvane Snehicha Bhootham (1978)
70. Mudhra Mothiram (1978)
71. Mattoru Karnan (1978)
72. Kanyaka (1978)
73. Kalpa Vriksham (1978)
74. Jayikkanaayi Janichavan (1978)
75. Bharyayum Kamukiyum (1978)
76. Nithya Vasantham (1979)
77. Choola (1979)
78. Manava Dharmam (1979)
79. Vellayani Paramu (1979)
80. Ormayil Nee Mathram (1979)
81. Devadasi (1979; Unreleased)
82. Theenalangal (1980)
83. Prakadanam (1980)
84. Oru Varsham Oru Maasam (1980)
85. Karipuranda Jeevithangal (1980)
86. Ithikkara Pakki (1980)
87. Kodumudikal (1981)
88. Theerathinu Ariyumo Thirayude vedana (Unreleased 1995)
89. Attimari (1981)
90. Ellam Ninakku Vendi (1981)
91. Dhruva Sangamam (1981)
92. Theekali (1981)
93. Nagamadathu Thampuratti (1982)
94. Thuranna Jail (1982)
95. Sooryan (1982)
96. Post Mortem (1982)
97. Madrasile Mon (1982)
98. Koaritharicha Naal (1982)
99. Jumbulingam (1982)
100. Keni (1982)
101. Yuddham (1983)
102. Sandhya Vandanam (1983)
103. Pourasham (1983)
104. Mahabali (1983)
105. Kolakomban (1983)
106. Kattaruvi (1983)
107. Chakravalam Chuvannappol (1983)
108. Attakkalasam (1983)
109. Arabikadal (1983)
110. Swanthamevide Bandhamevide (1984)
111. Makale Mappu Tharu (1984)
112. Ivide Thudangunnu (1984)
113. Pathamudayam (1985)
114. Ezhu Muthal Onpathu Vare (1985)
115. Azhiyatha Bandhangal (1985)
116. Makan Ente Makan (1985)
117. Mounanombaram (1985)
118. Ente Kanakkuyil (1985)
119. Shobaraj (1986)
120. Kunjattakilikal (1986)
121. Iniyum Kurukshethrum (1986)
122. Ente Entethu Mathram (1986)
123. Manasil Oru Manimuthu (1986)
124. Mauna Nombaram (1986)
125. Akalangalil (1986)
126. Jaithra Yaathra (1987)
127. Ithu Ente Neethi (1987)
128. Nagapanchami (1989)
129. Rajavazhcha (1990)
130. Paadatha Veenayum Paadum (1990)
131. Dollar (1993 produced by Mr.Raju Joseph, Thushara films, shot in USA & India)
132. FACT (Documentary 1961, starring Sasikumar, Jose Prakash & Aranmula Ponnamma), namely ONAKKAZHCHA
133. Panchamurtham( Tamil-1978 starring M.R.Radha&Jaishankar-Yesodha films, Producer- Sahul; www.cinesouth.com)
134. Oralkoodi Kallanayi(1964– Sasikumar &P.A Thomas – Thomas Pictures)
135. Woodlex Furniture (Advt. film for Woodlex furniture, Calicut: produced by Mr.Usman)

== See also ==
- List of Malayalam films from 1976 to 1980
- List of Malayalam films from 1981 to 1985
- List of Malayalam films from 1986 to 1990
