= Meena (Malayalam actress) =

Malayalam actress

- Born: 22 April 1941; Haripad, Kingdom of Travancore
- Died: 17 September 1997 (aged 56)
- Other names: Mary Joseph, Mummy
- Occupation: Actress
- Years active: 1960s–1997
- Spouse: K. K. Joseph
- Parent(s): Koikkalethu Itty Cheria Eapen; Eleyamma Eapen

Mary Joseph, known professionally as Meena (22 April 1941 – 17 September 1997), was an Indian actress. She primarily appeared in Malayalam movies. She died on 17 September 1997 due to a cardiac arrest.

== Early life ==
Meena (Mary Joseph) was the eighth child in a Mar Thoma Syrian Christian family from Kumarapuram-Haripad, in Alappuzha. Born on 22 April 1941 to Koyikkaleth Itty Cheria Eapen and his wife, Eleyamma Eapen, she began her early career in theatre in Kalanilayam and Geetha Arts Club. Kudumbini (1964) was her Malayalam film debut.

== Personal life ==
She was married to K.K. Joseph. She died on 17 September 1997 on the set of Anjara Kalyanam.

== Filmography ==
=== 1960s ===
Year	Title	Role	Notes
1964	Kudumbini	Sundari Kaniyathi	
1965	Kathirunna Nikah	Laila's mother	
1965	Kochumon	Mary	
1965	Porter Kunjali	Vanithasamajam Member	
1965	Subaidha	Ayisha	
1966	Thankakudam	Johny's wife	
1966	Pinchuhridhayam	Subhadra Ammayi	
1966	Kanmanikal		
1966	Poochakkanni		
1966	Mayor Nair	Lakshmi	
1966	Sthanarthi Saramma	Rosamma	
1966	Penmakkal	Kunjamma	
1967	Anweshichu Kandethiyilla	Annamma	
1967	Jeevikkan Anuvadikku		
1967	Bhagyamudra		
1967	Naadan Pennu	Saramma	
1967	Ollathu Mathi		
1967	Ramanan	Madhavi Amma	
1967	Balyakalasakhi		
1967	Agniputhri		
1967	Chithramela		
1967	Aval		
1968	Karthika	Rajamma's mother	
1968	Viruthan Shanku	Bhargavi	
1968	Kaliyalla Kalyanam		
1968	Lakshaprabhu		
1968	Velutha Kathreena	Maryamma	
1968	Manaswini	Jaanamma	
1968	Pengal	Saina	
1968	Adhyapika		
1969	Rahasyam	Shyamala Thampi	
1969	Kattu Kurangu	Kamalam	
1969	Chattambi Kavala	Rosamma	
1969	Rest House	Prof. Lakshmi	
1969	Velliyazhcha	Parvathiyamma	
1969	Ballatha Pahayan	Mymoon	
1969	Kallichellamma	Kalyani	
1969	Poojapushpam		

=== 1970s ===
Year	Title	Role	Notes
1970	Sabarimala Sree Dharmashastha		
1970	Aranazhika Neram	Annamma	
1970	Saraswathi	Meenakshi	
1970	Anadha	Kamalam	
1970	Detective 909 Keralathil		
1970	Kalpana	Lakshmi	
1970	Ezhuthatha Kadha	Mrs. Nair	
1970	Lottery Ticket	Rajamma's mother	
1970	Rakthapushpam	Mankamma	
1970	Nilakkatha Chalanangal		
1970	Kurukshethram		
1970	Priya		
1970	Ambalapravu	Rudrani	
1971	Vivahasammanam	Madhavi	
1971	Gangasangamam	Michael's wife	
1971	Aval Alpam Vaikippoyi		
1971	Line Bus	Pankiyamma	
1971	Kalithozhi	Amritham	
1971	Jalakanyaka		
1971	Achante Bharya	Karunakaran's mother	
1971	Karakanakadal	Kunjeli	
1971	Muthassi	Meenakshikutty	
1971	Makane Ninakku Vendi	Martha	
1971	Yogamullaval		
1971	Bobanum Moliyum	Saramma	
1972	Devi		
1972	Omana		
1972	Lakshyam	Mariya	
1972	Puthrakameshti		
1972	Ananthasayanam		
1972	Achanum Bappayum	Kunjupathumma	
1972	Maravil Thirivu Sookshikkuka	Allu Mariya	
1973	Panchavadi	Vishalam	
1973	Padmavyooham	Anappara Kunjamma	
1973	Thiruvabharanam	Mrs. Gonsalves	
1973	Thekkan Kattu	Soshamma's mother	
1973	Ladies Hostel	Warden Malathi	
1973	Nakhangal	Annamma	
1973	Achani	Srimathi Raghavan	
1973	Thaniniram	Insane lady	
1973	Pavangal Pennungal		
1973	Kavitha		
1973	Masappady Mathupillai	Naniyamma	
1973	Thottavadi	Subhashini	
1973	Urvashi Bharathi		
1974	Angathattu		
1974	Alakal		
1974	Nadeenadanmare Avasyamundu		
1974	Night Duty	Kamalamma	
1974	Rajahamsam	Chandran's mother	
1974	Thacholi Marumakan Chandu	Eppennu	
1974	Sethubandhanam	Parukutty	
1974	Vrindavanam		
1974	Honeymoon		
1974	Oru Pidi Ari		
1974	Poonthenaruvi	Saramma	
1974	Bhoomidevi Pushpiniyayi	Lady Doctor	
1974	Chattakari	Mrs. Warrier	
1974	College Girl	Meenakshi	
1974	Manyasree Viswamithran	Aluvalia	
1974	Ayalathe Sundari	Meenakshi	
1974	Pancha Thanthram	Kochang Faroka/Kochuparu	
1975	Dharmakshetre Kurukshetre		
1975	Thaamarathoni		
1975	Pulivaalu		
1975	Manishada		
1975	Madhurappathinezhu		
1975	Pennpada	Meenakshi Chechi	
1975	Love Marriage	Mini/Meenakshiyamma	
1975	Kuttichaathan		
1975	Alibabayum 41 Kallanmaarum	Pathumma	
1975	Velicham Akale		
1975	Paalazhi Madhanam		
1975	Aaranyakaandam		
1975	Priyamulla Sophia		
1975	Manishada	Meenakshi	
1975	Ayodhya	Jayaraman's mother	
1975	Hello Darling	Kochu Narayani	
1975	Chuvanna Sandhyakal	Gowriyamma	
1975	Pravaham	Savithri	
1975	Picnic	Sarojiniyamma	
1975	Abhimaanam	Chandrika	
1975	Cheenavala	Paaru	
1976	Aalinganam	Sharadamma	
1976	Panchami	Periyakka	
1976	Chottanikkara Amma		
1976	Abhinandanam	Saraswathi	
1976	Yudhabhoomi		
1976	Ajayanum Vijayanum	Gomathi	
1976	Kaamadhenu	Bhavani	
1976	Amrithavaahini	Dakshyani	
1976	Pick Pocket	Panchali	
1976	Paarijatham		
1976	Kenalum Collectrum		
1976	Kanyaadaanam		
1976	Light House	Meenakshi	
1976	Kaayamkulam Kochunniyude Makan		
1976	Ayalkkaari	Flory	
1976	Rajayogam		
1976	Aayiram Janmangal	Lakshmi's mother	
1976	Anubhavam	Reetha	
1976	Surveykkallu		
1976	Pushpasharam		
1977	Ammini Ammaavan	Meenakshi	
1977	Muttathe Mulla	Kalyani	
1977	Ammaayi Amma		
1977	Karnaparvam		
1977	Chathurvedam	Valsala's mother	
1977	Sangamam		
1977	Aadhya Paadam		
1977	Mohavum Mukthiyum		
1977	Randu Lokam		
1977	Ninakku Njaanum Enikku Neeyum	Bhargavi	
1977	Minimol		
1977	Innale Innu		
1977	Akale Aakaasham		
1977	Rathimanmadhan		
1977	Thaalappoli		
1977	Lakshmi		
1977	Aparaajitha		
1977	Abhinivesham	Saraswathy	
1977	Itha Ivide Vare	Jaanuvamma	
1977	Achaaram Ammini Osharam Omana	Paruvamma	
1977	Yudhakaandam	Vilasini	
1977	Angeekaaram	Devaki Teacher	
1977	Vezhambal		
1977	Anugraham	Ravi's Aunty	
1977	Varadakshina		
1977	Panchamrutham	Mariamma	
1978	Avakaasham		
1978	Puthariyankam		
1978	Yagaswam	Ammalu	
1978	Avalude Ravukal	Mariyaamma Chedathi	
1978	Thacholi Ambu	Thacholi Ambu's mother	
1978	Ninakku Njaanum Enikku Neeyum	Bhargavi	
1978	Midukkipponnamma		
1978	Anubhoothikalude Nimisham		
1978	Kaithappoo		
1978	Snehikkan Oru Pennu		
1978	Madhurikkunna Raathri		
1978	Premashilpi	Reetha's mother	
1978	Kadathanaattu Maakkam	Bhayami	
1978	Snehikkan Samayamilla		
1978	Rathinirvedam	Narayaniyamma	
1978	Ashtamudikkaayal		
1978	Ee Ganam Marakkumo		
1978	Padakuthira		
1978	Sathrusamhaaram		
1978	Madanolsavam	Mariyamma	
1978	Madaalasa	Kochamma	
1978	Thamburatti	Thampuratti's mother	
1978	Eeta		
1978	Mudramothiram	Sudhakaran's mother	
1978	Kudumbam Namukku Sreekovil		
1978	Bhaaryayum Kaamukiyum		
1979	Maanavadharmam		
1979	Chuvanna Chirakukal		
1979	Anubhavangale Nanni		
1979	Nithyavasantham		
1979	Mochanam		
1979	Choola		
1979	Iniyum Kaanaam	Janakiyamma	
1979	Ente Neelakaasham	Devaki	
1979	Angakkuri	Amminiyamma	
1979	Ezhunirangal	Madhavi	
1979	Rakthamillatha Manushyan	Sumathi's mother	
1979	Puthiya Velicham		
1979	Allauddinum Albhutha Vilakkum	Fathima	
1979	Neeyo Njaano	Akkaal	
1979	Vellayani Paramu	Kalyaniyamma	
1979	Iniyethra Sandhyakal		
1979	Aavesham		
1979	Aarattu	Thresya	
1979	Vaaleduthaven Vaalaal		
1979	Thuramukham	Pankajakshi	
1979	Enikku Njaan Swantham	Vasanthi	
1979	Kathirmandapam		

=== 1980s ===
Year	Title	Role	Notes
1980	Naayattu	Janaki	
1980	Puzha		
1980	Oru Varsham Oru Maasam		
1980	Raagam Thaanam Pallavi	Jayachandran's mother	
1980	Lorry	Thankamma	
1980	Ivar	Savithri's mother	
1980	Adhikaram	Lakshmi	
1980	Ethikkara Pakky	Pathumma	
1980	Arangum Aniyarayum	Thankamani	
1980	Prakadanam	Gopalan's mother	
1980	Air Hostess	Rathi's mother	
1980	Swandam Enna Padam	Santhamma	
1980	Ammayum Makalum	Lakshmi	
1980	Swarga Devatha		
1980	Youvanam Daaham		
1980	Kaantha Valayam	Margaret/Maggie	
1980	Meen	Maryamma	
1981	Dhruvasangamam	Doctor	
1981	Agni Yudham		
1981	Arikkari Ammu		
1981	Kilungaatha Changalakal		
1981	Itha Oru Dhikkari		
1981	Theekkali		
1981	Asthamikkatha Pakalukal		
1981	Karimpoocha	Annamma	
1981	Sambhavam		
1981	Kolilakkam		
1982	Post Mortem	Reethamma	
1982	Nagamadathu Thampuratti	Thamburatti	
1982	Mazha Nilaavu	Meenakshi	
1982	Sooryan	Lakshmi	
1982	Beedi Kunjamma	Paruvamma	
1982	Marmaram	Narayan Iyer's mother	
1982	Thuranna Jail	Kunjikutty	
1982	Kaaliya Mardhanam	Mrs. Menon	
1982	Ivan Oru Simham	Usha's mother	
1982	Mukhangal	Rukmini	
1982	Madrasile Mon		
1982	Odukkam Thudakkam		
1982	Jambulingam		
1982	Sree Ayyappanum Vavarum		
1982	Chilanthivala	Mary	
1982	Ponmudy	Karthu	
1982	Kurukkante Kalyanam	Amina	
1982	Enikkum Oru Divasam	Pathumma	
1982	Saravarsham	Savitha's mother	
1982	Padayottam	Queen of Kolathunadu	
1983	Deepaaradhana	Chinthamani Chellamma	
1983	Mahabali		
1983	Kaikeyi		
1983	Kaathirunna Naal		
1983	Guru Dakshina	Keshavan's wife	
1983	Eenam		
1983	Ente Katha	Kunjulakshmi	
1983	Aaroodam	Devaki	
1983	Paalam	Venu's mother	
1983	Thaavalam	Kamalakshi	
1983	Bandham	Maaluvamma	
1983	Lekhayude Maranam Oru Flashback	Actress Jayamalathi's mother	
1983	Ee Vazhi Mathram	Rajan's mother	
1983	Mazhanilavu	Meenakshi	
1983	Ee Yugam	Lakshmi	
1983	Kaattaruvi	Achamma	
1983	Kinnaram	Mrs. Das	
1983	Passport	Mariyamma	
1983	Pourasham	Chellamma	
1983	Aattakalasam	Marykutty's mother	
1984	Mangalam Nerunnu	Thresiamma	
1984	Kadamattathachan	Thresia	
1984	Vanitha Police	Chellappan Pilla's wife	
1984	Oru Nimsham Tharoo	Madhu's mother	
1984	Ethirppukal	Ravi's mother	
1984	Sreekrishna Parunthu		
1984	Amme Narayana		
1984	Kooduthedunna Parava	Sarasamma	
1984	Anthichuvappu		
1984	Akkacheyude Kunjuvava		
1984	Krishna Guruvayoorappa	Parvathi	
1984	Ivide Thudangunnu	Saradha	
1984	Athirathram	Annamma	
1984	Kaliyil Alpam Karyam	Lakshmi	
1984	Ente Upasana	Arjunan's mother	
1984	Thirakkil Alppa Samayam	Bhanumathi	
1984	Makale Mappu Tharu	Lakshmi	
1984	Onnanu Nammal	Karthyayaniyamma	
1984	Appunni	Menon's mother	
1984	Swanthamevide Bandhamevide	Bhageerathi	
1985	Madhuvidhu Theerum Mumbe	Shoshamma	
1985	Aram + Aram = Kinnaram		
1985	Idanilangal	Kalikutttiyamma	
1985	Azhiyatha Bandhangal	Rajalakshmiyamma	
1985	Premalekhanam	Eliyamma	
1985	Mulamoottil Adima	Parvathyamma	
1985	Ente Kaanakkuyil	Bharathi	
1985	Ee Lokam Evide Kure Manushyar	Ummer's mother	
1985	Thammil Thammil	Rajagopal's mother in law	
1985	Principal Olivil		
1985	Manicheppu Thurannappol		
1985	Mounanombaram		
1985	Karimpinpoovinakkare	Thampi's mother	
1986	Railway Cross		
1986	Bhagavan		
1986	Chilambu	Appu Nair's second wife	
1986	Oppam Oppathinoppam		
1986	Pappan Priyappetta Pappan	Ammini	
1986	Akalangalil	Madhavi	
1986	Ennennum Kannettante	Lakshmi	
1986	Onnu Randu Moonnu	Lakshmi	
1986	Manasiloru Manimuthu	Sukumari	
1986	Shyama	Chandran's mother	
1986	Aalorungi Arangorungi	Padmavathi	
1986	Oru Katha Oru Nunakkatha	Sulochana Menon	
1986	Iniyum Kurukshetrum	Karthyayani	
1986	Kunjattakilikal	Bhageerathi	
1987	Rithubhedam	Lakshmikuttyamma	
1987	Itha Samayamayi	Sunny's mother	
1987	Kaala Rathri		
1987	Kaiyethum Doorathu		
1987	Swargam	Soudaminiyamma	
1987	Achuvettante Veedu	Saradha	
1987	Vazhiyorakazchakal	Sridevi's mother	
1987	Nadodikkattu	Radha's mother	
1987	Aankiliyude Tharattu	Gomathi	
1988	Kandathum Kettathum	Mrs. Padmanabhan	
1988	Charavalayam		
1989	Kodungalloor Bhagavathi		
1989	Rathibhavam		
1989	Aattinakkare		
1989	Maharajavu		
1989	Annakkuttee Kodambaakkam Villikkunnu	Chinnammu	
1989	Varnam	Major's wife	
1989	Mazhavilkavadi	Nangeli	
1989	Devadas	Karthyayani	
1989	Adikkurippu	Bhaskara Pillai's mother	
1989	Oru Sayahnathinte Swapnam		
1989	Varavelpu	Rugmini	

=== 1990s ===
Year	Film	Role	Notes
1990	Anantha Vruthantham	Subbamma	
1990	Orukkam	Kamalamma	
1990	Indrajaalam	Mariyamma	
1990	Sasneham	Aliyamma	
1990	Dr. Pasupathy	Pappan's mother	
1990	Thalayanamanthram	Gigi Daniel	
1991	Aakasha Kottayile Sultan	Pappy's sister	
1991	Ulladakkam		
1991	Kanalkkattu		
1991	Thudar Katha	Vishnu's mother	
1991	Ganamela	Karthyayani	
1991	Pookkalam Varavayi	Jayaraj's sister	
1992	Priyapetta Kukku	Sandhya's mother	
1992	Yodha	Vasumathi	
1992	Mahanagaram	Advocate	
1992	Ayalathe Adheham	Premachandran's mother	
1993	Thirasheelakku Pinnil (Nangachithrangalkkethire)		
1993	Meleparambil Aanveedu	Bhanumathi	
1993	Sthreedhanam	Amma	
1993	Midhunam	Housemaid	
1993	CID Unnikrishnan B.A., B.Ed.		
1994	Cheppadividya	Kalyani	
1994	Varaphalam	Geetha's mother	
1994	Pingami	Mrs. Menon	
1994	Kudumba Vishesham	Kikkili Kochamma	
1994	Vishnu	Vishnu's mother	
1994	Vardhakya Puranam	Susanna	
1995	Avittam Thirunaal Aarogya Sriman		
1995	Sindoora Rekha	Balachandran's mother	
1995	Aniyan Bava Chetan Bava	Aniyan Bava's wife	
1995	Mangalam Veettil Manaseswari Gupta	Annamma Nurse	
1995	Kakkakkum Poochakkum Kalyanam	Janakiyamma	
1996	Kanjirappilly Kariyachan	Thresia	
1996	April 19	Jayan's aunt	
1996	Hey Madam		
1997	Kilikkurishiyil Kudumbamela	Pankajam	
1997	Kannur		
1997	Shobhanam		
1997	The Car	Janakiyamma	
1998	Thirakalkkappuram		

== Dramas ==
- Nirdhoshi
