= Rest House =

- Directed by: J. Sasikumar
- Written by: K. P. Kottarakkara
- Screenplay by: K. P. Kottarakkara
- Produced by: K. P. Kottarakkara Ganesh Pictures
- Starring: Prem Nazir; Sheela; Sreelatha Namboothiri; Raghavan
- Cinematography: C. J. Mohan
- Edited by: T. R. Sreenivasalu
- Music by: M. K. Arjunan
- Production company: Ganesh Pictures
- Distributed by: Ganesh Pictures
- Release date: 18 December 1969
- Country: India
- Language: Malayalam

Rest House is a 1969 Indian Malayalam film, directed by J. Sasikumar and produced by K. P. Kottarakkara under the Ganesh Pictures banner. The film stars Prem Nazir, Sheela, Sreelatha Namboothiri and Raghavan in the lead roles. The film had musical score by M. K. Arjunan.

== Cast ==
- Prem Nazir as Raghu
- Sheela as Leela
- K. P. Ummer as Balan
- Adoor Bhasi (Double Role) as Beetle Appu and Professor Das
- Sreelatha Namboothiri as Latha
- Raghavan
- Friend Ramaswamy as Watcher
- Kunchan
- Lakshmi
- Meena as Professor Lakshmi
- Paravoor Bharathan
- Vincent
- Sadhana as Sathi
- Kottayam Chellappan
- Hamza
- Nabeesa
- Vijaya Kamalam
- Hema

== Soundtrack ==
All lyrics are written by Sreekumaran Thampi; all music is composed by M. K. Arjunan.

| No. | Title | Artist(s) | Length |
|---|---|---|---|
| 1. | "Maanakkedaayallo" | P. Jayachandran, C. O. Anto |
| 2. | "Maanakkedaayallo" (Female) | P. Leela, L. R. Eswari |
| 3. | "Muthilum Muthaaya" | K. J. Yesudas |
| 4. | "Paadaatha Veenayum" | K. J. Yesudas |
| 5. | "Pournami Chandrika Thottu Vilichu" | K. J. Yesudas |
| 6. | "Vasanthame Vaariyeriyoo" | S. Janaki |
| 7. | "Vilakkevide" | C. O. Anto |
| 8. | "Yamune Yadukula Rathidevanevide" | S. Janaki, P. Jayachandran |
