= Parivarthanam =

- Directed by: J. Sasikumar
- Written by: Sreekumaran Thampi
- Screenplay by: Sreekumaran Thampi
- Produced by: N. C. Menon
- Starring: Prem Nazir; Srividya; Sripriya; Adoor Bhasi
- Cinematography: C. J. Mohan
- Edited by: K. Sankunni
- Music by: M. S. Viswanathan
- Production company: Dhanalakshmi Kalamandir
- Distributed by: Dhanalakshmi Kalamandir
- Release date: 22 July 1977
- Country: India
- Language: Malayalam

Parivarthanam is a 1977 Indian Malayalam-language film, directed by J. Sasikumar and produced by N. C. Menon. The film stars Prem Nazir, Srividya, Sripriya and Adoor Bhasi. The film has musical score by M. S. Viswanathan.

== Cast ==
- Prem Nazir as Madhu
- Srividya as Gracy
- Sripriya as Usha
- Adoor Bhasi as Mathew
- Thikkurissy Sukumaran Nair as Bhaskaran
- Jose Prakash as Father Zacharia
- Manavalan Joseph as Warrier
- Sreelatha Namboothiri as Radha
- Prathapachandran as Father Francis
- Bahadoor as Jayan
- Thodupuzha Radhakrishnan as Prathapan

== Soundtrack ==
The music was composed by M. S. Viswanathan with lyrics by Sreekumaran Thampi.

No.	Song	Singers	Lyrics	Length (m:ss)
1	"Amaavaasiyil"	P. Jayachandran	Sreekumaran Thampi	
2	"Ambalappuzha Paalppaayasam"	Jolly Abraham	Sreekumaran Thampi	
3	"Jeevitham Pole Nadi"	K. J. Yesudas	Sreekumaran Thampi	
4	"Mazhavillaal Makarasandhya"	P. Susheela	Sreekumaran Thampi	
5	"Ragamalika Paadi"	K. J. Yesudas	Sreekumaran Thampi	
6	"Thankakkireedam Choodiya"	P. Jayachandran	Sreekumaran Thampi	
