= Pancha Thanthram =

Panchathanthram
- Directed by: J. Sasikumar
- Screenplay by: J. Sasikumar
- Produced by: E. K. Thyagarajan
- Starring: Prem Nazir; Jayabharathi; Adoor Bhasi; Jose Prakash
- Cinematography: C. J. Mohan
- Edited by: K. Sankunni
- Music by: G. Devarajan
- Production company: Sree Murugalaya
- Release date: 22 March 1974
- Running time: 141 minutes
- Country: India
- Language: Malayalam

Pancha Thanthram is a 1974 Indian Malayalam-language fantasy thriller film directed by J. Sasikumar and produced by E. K. Thyagarajan. The script was written by Sasikumar, Sreemoolanagaram Vijayan, music by G. Devarajan and lyrics by Sreekumaran Thampi. The cast includes Prem Nazir, Jayabharathi, Adoor Bhasi, Jose Prakash, Sankaradi, Sreelatha, T. R. Omana, T. S. Muthaiah, Bahadoor. K. P. Ummer and Vincent were in guest appearances. The film was released on 22 March 1974.

== Plot ==
The story pivots around the mysterious death of Raja Vamana Varma, the king of a small city-state in Kerala. A huge bronze statue of the king murders several people with a sword. It is believed that the ghost of the king enters the statue and commits the murders. The statue attempts to murder the queen, Gayathri Devi, and her five-year-old son. The queen escapes and the prince runs away from the palace.

She shifts to the annex of the palace. Years roll by. The government appoints anthropologist Dr. Menon to investigate the murders in and around the palace. Menon comes to the palace with his daughter Sindhu and his assistant Krishnankutty to investigate the mystery. The ghost murders Menon. Sindhu decides to stay back in the palace to solve the mystery behind the murders by the king's 'ghost'.

The ghost also murders a police officer appointed for the investigation. Detective officers Rajendran and Gupta are sent by the Central Government for the investigation. Rajendran centres his investigation on Hotel Ding Mona, owned by a Chinese woman Kochang Farooka.

Hotel dancer Julie, receptionist Charlie, a regular visitor to the hotel – Sardar Garnayal Singh are the prime suspects in the mystery behind the murders. Rajendran falls in love with Sindhu.

Rajendran's lookalike and brother, Shekhar, comes to the hotel and joins the suspects in the murder case. And several twists and turns in the investigation unravel the facts behind the mysteries around the palace.

It turns out that the palace manager Kurup and the queen's faithful servant Kochu Paru are the real culprits. Their aim is to unearth treasures – gold, gems and diamonds – hidden in the palace by the king's faithful servant Dinesh Chandran. Kochu Paru disguised as Kochang Farooka and Kurup disguised as an Arab were implementing their plan to find the hidden treasure. Dinesh Chandran, held captive by them does not reveal where the treasure is hidden.

Rajendran succeeds in solving the mystery and it turns out that he is none other than the prince who ran away from the palace years ago. The queen identifies him by the scar on his chest. It is revealed that Shekhar, Rajendran's lookalike brother, was in fact Rajendran himself. It was all a part of his plan to crack the mystery murders. Kurup and his men murdered the king and the 'ghost' was Kurup himself. Kurup committed the murders by getting into a bronze mould identical to the statue.

The dancer Julie is none other than Vimala Gupta, Rajendran's assistant Gupta's wife. She took up the job at the hotel, which was the culprits' hangout, in order to uncover their plans. The culprits get arrested and Rajendran marries Sindhu.

== Cast ==
- Prem Nazir as Rajendran
- Jayabharathi as Sindhu
- Adoor Bhasi as Krishnankutty
- Bahadoor as Gupta
- Jose Prakash as Sardar Garnayal Singh
- Mohan Sharma
- Sankaradi as Kurup
- Sreelatha Namboothiri
- T. R. Omana
- Sadhana as Julie
- T. S. Muthaiah
- Paul Vengola
- Baby Vijaya
- Kaduvakulam Antony as Charlie
- Lakshmanan
- M. G. Soman
- Meena
- Vijaya
- K. P. Ummer as Professor(Guest appearance)
- Vincent

== Soundtrack ==
The music was composed by G. Devarajan with lyrics by Sreekumaran Thampi.

Song	Singers
"Aavanipponpulari"	K. J. Yesudas
"Jeevithamoru Madhushaala"	K. J. Yesudas, Chorus
"Kasthoorimanam"	P. Madhuri
"Raajamallikal"	K. J. Yesudas, P. Madhuri
"Shaarada Rajanee"	K. J. Yesudas
