= Chathurvedam =

- Directed by: J. Sasikumar
- Written by: S. L. Puram Sadanandan
- Screenplay by: S. L. Puram Sadanandan
- Produced by: S. S. R. Kalaivaanan
- Starring: Prem Nazir; Adoor Bhasi; Thikkurissy Sukumaran Nair; Sankaradi; Padmapriya
- Cinematography: C. J. Mohan
- Edited by: K. Sankunni
- Music by: G. Devarajan
- Production company: Manikantan Productions
- Distributed by: Manikantan Productions
- Release date: 29 April 1977
- Country: India
- Language: Malayalam

Chathurvedam is a 1977 Indian Malayalam-language film, directed by J. Sasikumar and produced by S. S. R. Kalaivaanan. The film stars Prem Nazir, Adoor Bhasi, Thikkurissy Sukumaran Nair, Sankaradi, Padmapriya. The film has musical score by G. Devarajan.

== Cast ==
- Prem Nazir
- Adoor Bhasi
- Thikkurissy Sukumaran Nair
- Sankaradi
- Padmapriya
- Sreelatha Namboothiri
- Alummoodan
- Bahadoor
- Meena
- Paravoor Bharathan
- Philomina

== Soundtrack ==
The music was composed by G. Devarajan and the lyrics were written by Sreekumaran Thampi.

No.	Song	Singers	Lyrics	Length (m:ss)
1	"Chaaru Sumaraaji Mukhi"	K. J. Yesudas	Sreekumaran Thampi	
2	"Chiriyude Poonthoppil"	K. J. Yesudas, P. Madhuri	Sreekumaran Thampi	
3	"Padaan Bhayamilla"	K. J. Yesudas	Sreekumaran Thampi	
4	"Udayaasthamaya Pooja"	K. J. Yesudas	Sreekumaran Thampi	
