= Oru Varsham Oru Maasam =

1980 film by J. Sasikumar

- Directed by: J. Sasikumar
- Written by: Kanam E. J.
- Screenplay by: Kanam E. J.
- Starring: Jayabharathi; Sankaradi; Bahadoor; M. G. Soman
- Cinematography: J. G. Vijayam
- Edited by: V. P. Krishnan
- Music by: Raveendran
- Production company: Navaratna Movies
- Distributed by: Navaratna Movies
- Release date: 16 October 1980
- Country: India
- Language: Malayalam

Oru Varsham Oru Maasam is a 1980 Indian Malayalam-language film directed by J. Sasikumar and starring Jayabharathi, Sankaradi, Bahadoor and M. G. Soman. The film has a musical score by Raveendran.

== Cast ==
- Jayabharathi
- Sankaradi
- Bahadoor
- M. G. Soman
- Meena
- P. R. Varalakshmi

== Soundtrack ==
The music was composed by Raveendran with lyrics by Poovachal Khader.

No.	Song	Singers	Lyrics	Length (m:ss)
1	"Bhoolokathil"	C. O. Anto, Jolly Abraham, Sherin Peters	Poovachal Khader	
2	"Iniyente Omalinaayoru"	K. J. Yesudas	Poovachal Khader	
3	"Kooduvediyum Dehiyakalum"	K. J. Yesudas	Poovachal Khader	
4	"Murukiya Izhakalil"	S. Janaki	Poovachal Khader	
