= Night Duty =

- Directed by: J. Sasikumar
- Written by: S. L. Puram Sadanandan
- Screenplay by: S. L. Puram Sadanandan
- Produced by: Thiruppathi Chettiyar
- Starring: Prem Nazir; Jayabharathi; Kaviyoor Ponnamma; Adoor Bhasi
- Edited by: K. Sankunni
- Music by: V. Dakshinamoorthy
- Production company: Evershine Productions
- Distributed by: Evershine Productions
- Release date: 17 May 1974
- Country: India
- Language: Malayalam

Night Duty is a 1974 Indian Malayalam-language film directed by J. Sasikumar and produced by Thiruppathi Chettiyar. The film stars Prem Nazir, Jayabharathi, Kaviyoor Ponnamma and Adoor Bhasi in the lead roles. V. Dakshinamoorthy composed the music.

== Cast ==
- Prem Nazir as Radhakrishnan
- Jayabharathi as Vimala
- Kaviyoor Ponnamma as Savithriyamma
- Adoor Bhasi as Padmanabha Panikker
- Sankaradi as Kuttan pilla
- Sreelatha Namboothiri as Rajamma
- T. R. Omana as Devakiyamma
- T. S. Muthaiah as Warrier
- Bahadoor as Krishnankutty
- Meena as Kamalamma
- Sobha as Ammini
- Muthukulam Raghavan Pillai as Ponnuvelan

== Soundtrack ==
The music was composed by V. Dakshinamoorthy and the song lyrics were written by Vayalar Ramavarma.

No.	Song	Singers	Lyrics	Length (m:ss)
1	"Aayiram Mukhangal"	K. J. Yesudas	Vayalar Ramavarma	
2	"Anthimalarikal Poothu"	K. J. Yesudas	Vayalar Ramavarma	
3	"Innu Ninte Youvanathinezhazhaku"	L. R. Eeswari, Ambili, Sreelatha Namboothiri	Vayalar Ramavarma	
4	"Manassoru Devikshethram"	K. J. Yesudas, P. Susheela	Vayalar Ramavarma	
5	"Pushpasaayaka Nin"	P. Susheela	Vayalar Ramavarma	
6	"Sreemahaaganapathi"	Chorus, Jayashree, Sreelatha Namboothiri	Vayalar Ramavarma	
7	"Vilwamangalam Kandu"	S. Janaki	Vayalar Ramavarma	
