= Sethubandhanam (film) =

1974 film by J. Sasikumar

- Poster
- Directed by: J. Sasikumar
- Written by: Sreekumaran Thampi
- Screenplay by: Sreekumaran Thampi
- Produced by: R. Somanathan
- Starring: Prem Nazir; Sukumari; Jayabharathi; Adoor Bhasi
- Cinematography: J. G. Vijayam
- Edited by: K. Sankunni
- Music by: G. Devarajan
- Production company: Soorya Pictures
- Distributed by: Soorya Pictures
- Release date: 19 April 1974
- Country: India
- Language: Malayalam

Sethubandhanam is a 1974 Indian Malayalam-language film, directed by J. Sasikumar and produced by R. Somanathan. The film stars Prem Nazir, Sukumari, Jayabharathi and Adoor Bhasi in the lead roles. The film has musical score by G. Devarajan. It is a remake of Tamil movie Kuzhandaiyum Deivamum, which itself was based on the 1961 film The Parent Trap - both based on the Erich Kästner's 1949 German novel Lisa and Lottie (German: Das doppelte Lottchen).

== Cast ==
- Prem Nazir as Gopinath
- Sukumari as Parvathi
- Jayabharathi as Latha
- Adoor Bhasi as Unnithan
- Prema as Schoolteacher
- Baby Sumathi as Saritha, Kavitha (double role)
- Bahadoor as Sasi
- Meena as Parukutty
- Sadhana as Susheela
- Anandavally as Gracy
- Muthukulam Raghavan Pillai as Vakkeel
- TS Muthaiah as Muthalali

== Soundtrack ==
The music was composed by G. Devarajan and the lyrics were written by Sreekumaran Thampi.

No.	Song	Singers	Lyrics	Length (m:ss)
1	"Kasthoori Gandhikal" (Om Namo Narayananaya)	K. J. Yesudas, P. Madhuri, Ayiroor Sadasivan	Sreekumaran Thampi	
2	"Manjakkilee Swarnakkilee"	Latha Raju	Sreekumaran Thampi	
3	"Munkopakkaari"	K. J. Yesudas	Sreekumaran Thampi	
4	"Pallavi Paadi"	K. J. Yesudas, P. Madhuri	Sreekumaran Thampi	
5	"Pidakkozhi Koovunna"	K. J. Yesudas, Chorus	Sreekumaran Thampi	
6	"Pinchu Hridayam"	P. Madhuri, Chorus	Sreekumaran Thampi	
7	"Pinchu Hridayam"	Latha Raju	Sreekumaran Thampi	
