= Brahmachari (1972 film) =

- Directed by: J. Sasikumar
- Written by: S. L. Puram Sadanandan
- Screenplay by: S. L. Puram Sadanandan
- Produced by: S. S. T. Lakshmanan; S. S. T. Subramaniyam; Thiruppathi Chettiyar
- Starring: Prem Nazir; Sharada; Adoor Bhasi; Jose Prakash
- Cinematography: J. G. Vijayam
- Edited by: K. Sankunni
- Music by: V. Dakshinamoorthy
- Production company: Evershine
- Release date: 13 October 1972
- Country: India
- Language: Malayalam

Brahmachari is a 1972 Indian Malayalam language film, directed by J. Sasikumar and produced by S. S. T. Lakshmanan, S. S. T. Subramaniyam and Thiruppathi Chettiyar. The film stars Prem Nazir, Sharada, Adoor Bhasi and Jose Prakash in the lead roles. The film had musical score by V. Dakshinamoorthy. The film was a remake of the 1967 Tamil film Penne Nee Vaazhga which was also remade in Telugu as Brahmachari (1968) and in Hindi as Ek Nari Ek Brahmachari (1971).

== Cast ==
- Prem Nazir as Jayachandran
- Sharada as Sreedevi/Vasanthy
- Adoor Bhasi as Veeramarthandan Pilla
- Bahadoor as Soman
- T. R. Omana as Bhargavi Pilla
- Jose Prakash as Venugopal
- Rani Chandra as Vimala
- Sujatha as Suvarna
- Kunchan as Kuttappan
- Sankaradi as Unnithan
- Baby
- T. S. Muthaiah as Sreedevi's father
- V. D. Rajappan as the Appunni
- Yamuna
- Ambili
- Girija
- John Varghese
- Justin
- Oolan Ramu
- Treesa

== Soundtrack ==
The music was composed by V. Dakshinamoorthy and the lyrics were written by Vayalar Ramavarma.

No.	Song	Singers	Lyrics	Length (m:ss)
1	"Chithrashilaapaalikal"	K. J. Yesudas	Vayalar Ramavarma	
2	"Innalathe Vennilaavin"	K. J. Yesudas	Vayalar Ramavarma	
3	"Karayoo Nee Karayoo"	P. Susheela	Vayalar Ramavarma	
4	"Njan Njan Njanenna"	K. J. Yesudas	Vayalar Ramavarma	
5	"Pathinezhu Thikayaatha"	K. J. Yesudas	Vayalar Ramavarma	
