= Thirayum Theeravum =

- Directed by: K. G. Rajasekharan
- Starring: Prem Nazir; Jayabharathi; Aranmula Ponnamma; Jayaprabha
- Edited by: K. Sankunni
- Music by: G. Devarajan
- Production company: KC Productions
- Distributed by: KC Productions
- Release date: 12 June 1980
- Country: India
- Language: Malayalam

Thirayum Theeravum (transl. Wave and Beach) is a 1980 Indian Malayalam film, directed by K. G. Rajasekharan. The film stars Prem Nazir, Jayabharathi, Aranmula Ponnamma and Jayaprabha in the lead roles. The film has musical score by G. Devarajan.

== Cast ==
- Prem Nazir as Adv. Premachandran
- Jayabharathi as Savithri
- Aranmula Ponnamma as Muthassi
- Jayaprabha as Usha
- M. G. Soman as Mohan
- Ravikumar as Balagopal
- Kaviyoor Ponnamma as Mohan's mother

== Soundtrack ==
The music was composed by G. Devarajan and the lyrics were written by Yusufali Kechery.

No.	Song	Singers	Lyrics	Length (m:ss)
1	"Gaaname Manojnja Sooname"	K. J. Yesudas, P. Madhuri	Yusufali Kechery	
2	"Leelaathilakam Nananju"	K. J. Yesudas, Vani Jairam, Chorus	Yusufali Kechery	
3	"Thedum Mizhikale"	Vani Jairam	Yusufali Kechery	
4	"Vassantha Chandralekhe"	K. J. Yesudas, P. Madhuri	Yusufali Kechery	
