= Akshayapaathram =

- Directed by: J. Sasikumar
- Written by: Kedamangalam Sadanandan; Sreekumaran Thampi (dialogues)
- Screenplay by: M. P. Rajeevan
- Produced by: Sreekumaran Thampi
- Starring: Prem Nazir; Kaviyoor Ponnamma; Adoor Bhasi; Lakshmi
- Cinematography: J. M. Vijayan
- Edited by: K. Sankunni
- Music by: M. S. Viswanathan
- Production company: Bhavani Rajeswari
- Distributed by: Bhavani Rajeswari
- Release date: 23 December 1977
- Country: India
- Language: Malayalam

Akshayapaathram is a 1977 Indian Malayalam film, directed by J. Sasikumar and produced by Sreekumaran Thampi. The film stars Prem Nazir, Kaviyoor Ponnamma, Adoor Bhasi and Lakshmi in the lead roles. The film has musical score by M. S. Viswanathan.

== Cast ==
- Prem Nazir
- Kaviyoor Ponnamma
- Adoor Bhasi
- Lakshmi
- Sreelatha Namboothiri
- T. R. Omana
- K. P. Ummer

== Soundtrack ==
The music was composed by M. S. Viswanathan and the lyrics were written by Sreekumaran Thampi.

| No. | Song | Singers | Lyrics | Length (m:ss) |
|---|---|---|---|---|
| 1 | "Kannante Chundathu" | K. J. Yesudas, S. Janaki | Sreekumaran Thampi | |
| 2 | "Madhuramulla Nombaram" | Vani Jairam | Sreekumaran Thampi | |
| 3 | "Manassoru Thaamarapoyka" | S. Janaki, Chorus | Sreekumaran Thampi | |
| 4 | "Marannuvo Nee Hridayeshwari" | K. J. Yesudas | Sreekumaran Thampi | |
| 5 | "Priyamulla Chettan" | P. Susheela | Sreekumaran Thampi | |
