= Lankadahanam =

- Directed by: J. Sasikumar
- Written by: K. P. Kottarakkara
- Screenplay by: K. P. Kottarakkara
- Produced by: K. P. Kottarakkara
- Starring: Prem Nazir; Adoor Bhasi; Jose Prakash; Sankaradi
- Cinematography: J. G. Vijayam
- Edited by: K. Sankunni
- Music by: M. S. Viswanathan
- Production company: Ganesh Pictures
- Distributed by: Ganesh Pictures
- Release date: 26 March 1971
- Country: India
- Language: Malayalam

Lankadahanam is a 1971 Indian Malayalam film, directed by J. Sasikumar and produced by K. P. Kottarakkara. The film stars Prem Nazir, Adoor Bhasi, Jose Prakash and Sankaradi in the lead roles. The film had musical score by M. S. Viswanathan.

== Cast ==
- Prem Nazir as Appunni Mash
- K. P. Ummer as Sekhar, Customs officer
- Adoor Bhasi as Mathai/Thirumeni
- Jose Prakash as Das
- Sankaradi as Adiyodi
- Sreelatha Namboothiri
- Friend Ramaswamy
- Paravoor Bharathan as Inspector
- Khadeeja as Rejani's Mother
- N. Govindankutty Police superintendent
- Ragini as Maheswariamma
- Vijayasree as Rejani

== Soundtrack ==
The music was composed by M. S. Viswanathan and the lyrics were written by Sreekumaran Thampi.

No.	Song	Singers	Lyrics	Length (m:ss)
1	"Eeshwaranorikkal"	K. J. Yesudas	Sreekumaran Thampi	
2	"Kilukile Chirikkum"	L. R. Eeswari	Sreekumaran Thampi	
3	"Nakshathra Raajyathe"	K. J. Yesudas	Sreekumaran Thampi	
4	"Panchavadiyile"	P. Jayachandran	Sreekumaran Thampi	
5	"Sooryanennoru Nakshathram"	K. J. Yesudas	Sreekumaran Thampi	
6	"Swarganandini"	K. J. Yesudas	Sreekumaran Thampi	
7	"Thiruvaabharanam Chaarthi"	P. Jayachandran, Chorus	Sreekumaran Thampi	
