= Mudramothiram =

- Directed by: J. Sasikumar
- Written by: Pappanamkodu Lakshmanan
- Screenplay by: Pappanamkodu Lakshmanan
- Produced by: E. K. Thyagarajan
- Starring: Prem Nazir; Jayabharathi; Jagathy Sreekumar; Sankaradi
- Cinematography: Anandakuttan
- Edited by: K. Sankunni
- Music by: G. Devarajan
- Production company: Sree Murugalaya Films
- Distributed by: Sree Murugalaya Films
- Release date: 24 March 1978
- Country: India
- Language: Malayalam

Mudramothiram is a 1978 Indian Malayalam film, directed by J. Sasikumar and produced by E. K. Thyagarajan. The film stars Prem Nazir, Jayabharathi, Jagathy Sreekumar and Sankaradi in the lead roles. The film has musical score by G. Devarajan.

== Cast ==
- Prem Nazir as Sudhakaran
- Jayabharathi as Usha
- Jagathy Sreekumar
- Sankaradi as Swami
- Manavalan Joseph as Mathai
- Kunchan as Baiju
- Maniyanpilla Raju as Kuttappan
- Baby Sumathi as Amina
- Bahadoor as Doctor
- Nellikode Bhaskaran as Beeran
- Sreelatha Namboothiri as Kamalamma
- Meena as Sudhakaran's Mother
- Stanley
- Seema as Rani

== Soundtrack ==
The music was composed by G. Devarajan and the lyrics were written by Sreekumaran Thampi.

No.	Song	Singers	Lyrics	Length (m:ss)
1	"Bhoomi Nammude Pettamma"	P. Susheela, P. Jayachandran, Chorus	Sreekumaran Thampi	
2	"Daivathin Veedevide"	K. J. Yesudas	Sreekumaran Thampi	
3	"Mazhamukil Chithravela"	K. J. Yesudas	Sreekumaran Thampi	
4	"Pallavi Nee Paadumo"	P. Susheela, P. Madhuri	Sreekumaran Thampi	
