= Iniyum Kaanaam =

- Directed by: Charles Ayyampally
- Written by: Thoppil Bhasi (dialogues)
- Screenplay by: Thoppil Bhasi
- Produced by: S. S. R. Thambidurai
- Starring: Prem Nazir; Vincent; Thikkurissy Sukumaran Nair; Ushakumari; Alummoodan
- Cinematography: P. Dathu
- Edited by: M. Babu
- Music by: M. S. Viswanathan
- Production company: Pankaj Art Pictures
- Distributed by: Pankaj Art Pictures
- Release date: 16 November 1979
- Country: India
- Language: Malayalam

Iniyum Kaanaam is a 1979 Indian Malayalam-language film, directed by Charles Ayyampally and produced by S. S. R. Thambidurai. The film stars Prem Nazir, Thikkurissy Sukumaran Nair, Ushakumari and Alummoodan. The film has musical score by M. S. Viswanathan.

== Cast ==
- Prem Nazir as Ramadas
- Vincent as Devan/Madanlal
- Ushakumari as Nirmala
- Vijayalalitha as Rita
- Vijaya
- Thikkurissy Sukumaran Nair as Ramdas's father
- Alummoodan as Kesavan
- Meena as Janakiamma
- Kottayam Santha as Parvathyamma
- Stanley
- Thodupuzha Radhakrishnan

== Soundtrack ==
The music was composed by M. S. Viswanathan and the lyrics were written by Chirayinkeezhu Ramakrishnan Nair.

No.	Song	Singers	Lyrics	Length (m:ss)
1	"Aalumkombathaadum"	P. Jayachandran, Jolly Abraham	Chirayinkeezhu Ramakrishnan Nair	
2	"Maamsapushpam Vidarnnu"	L. R. Eeswari	Chirayinkeezhu Ramakrishnan Nair	
3	"Neelappoykayil"	Vani Jairam	Chirayinkeezhu Ramakrishnan Nair	
