= Poojapushpam =

- Directed by: Thikkurissy Sukumaran Nair
- Written by: K. S. Gopalakrishnan; Thikkurissy Sukumaran Nair (dialogues)
- Produced by: K. S. Gopalakrishnan
- Starring: Prem Nazir; Sheela; Thikkurissy Sukumaran Nair; T. S. Muthaiah
- Music by: V. Dakshinamoorthy
- Production company: Sarada Pictures
- Distributed by: Sarada Pictures
- Release date: 17 September 1969
- Country: India
- Language: Malayalam

Poojapushpam is a 1969 Indian Malayalam-language film, directed by Thikkurissy Sukumaran Nair and produced by K. S. Gopalakrishnan (Tamil). The film stars Prem Nazir, Sheela, Thikkurissy Sukumaran Nair and T. S. Muthaiah. The film's score was composed by V. Dakshinamoorthy.

== Cast ==
- Prem Nazir
- Sheela
- Thikkurissy Sukumaran Nair
- T. S. Muthaiah
- Aranmula Ponnamma
- Bahadoor
- Khadeeja
- Meena
- S. P. Pillai
- Vijayasree

== Soundtrack ==
The music was composed by V. Dakshinamoorthy with lyrics by Thikkurissy Sukumaran Nair.

No.	Song	Singers	Lyrics	Length (m:ss)
1	"Akkare Nikkana"	K. J. Yesudas, L. R. Eeswari	Thikkurissy Sukumaran Nair	
2	"Kaamini Nin"	K. J. Yesudas	Thikkurissy Sukumaran Nair	
3	"Kasthoorippottu Maanju"	K. J. Yesudas, Renuka	Thikkurissy Sukumaran Nair	
4	"Kodi Janmameduthaalum" (Rajamallike)	K. J. Yesudas, S. Janaki	Thikkurissy Sukumaran Nair	
5	"Mohamo Daahamo"	S. Janaki	Thikkurissy Sukumaran Nair	
6	"Viralukalillaatha Vidwaante Kayyil"	K. J. Yesudas	Thikkurissy Sukumaran Nair	
