= Pooja (1967 film) =

- Directed by: P. Karamachandran
- Written by: P. Karamchandran
- Screenplay by: P. Karamchandran
- Produced by: P.V. Premachandran
- Starring: Prem Nazir; Sheela; Sukumari; T. S. Muthaiah
- Cinematography: R. N. Pillai
- Edited by: N. M. Victor
- Music by: G. Devarajan
- Production company: Shivachandra Productions
- Distributed by: Shivachandra Productions
- Release date: 8 November 1967
- Country: India
- Language: Malayalam

Pooja is a 1967 Indian Malayalam-language film written and directed by P. Karamachandran and produced by P.V. Premachandran. The film stars Prem Nazir, Sheela, Sukumari and T. S. Muthaiah. The film's score was composed by G. Devarajan.

== Cast ==
- Prem Nazir
- Sheela
- Sukumari
- T. S. Muthaiah
- Bahadoor
- G. K. Pillai
- Kottarakkara Sreedharan Nair
- Panjabi
- Prathapan
- Vijayanirmala

== Soundtrack ==
The music was composed by G. Devarajan with lyrics by P. Bhaskaran.

No.	Song	Singers	Lyrics	Length (m:ss)
1	"Maanasa Saarasamalar" (F)	S. Janaki	P. Bhaskaran	
2	"Maanasa Saarasamalarmanjariyil" (M)	K. J. Yesudas	P. Bhaskaran	
3	"Maavin Thayyinum"	P. Susheela	P. Bhaskaran	
4	"Olakkathaaliyum"	P. Susheela	P. Bhaskaran	
5	"Oru Kochu Swapnathinte"	P. Leela	P. Bhaskaran	
6	"Swargeeya Sundaranimisham"	S. Janaki	P. Bhaskaran	
7	"Vanachandrikayude"	P. Leela	P. Bhaskaran	
8	"Vidoorayaya Thaarake"	S. Janaki	P. Bhaskaran	

== Producer ==
- P.V. Premachandran
