= Kanmanikal =

1966 film by J. Sasikumar

- Directed by: J. Sasikumar
- Written by: Swarnnam; Thoppil Bhasi (dialogues)
- Screenplay by: Thoppil Bhasi
- Produced by: P. Ramakrishnan
- Starring: Prem Nazir; Sharada; Adoor Bhasi; Thikkurissy Sukumaran Nair
- Cinematography: W. R. Subba Rao
- Music by: G. Devarajan
- Release date: 16 October 1966
- Country: India
- Language: Malayalam

Kanmanikal (transl. Apple of the Eye) is a 1966 Indian Malayalam-language film, directed by J. Sasikumar and produced by P. Ramakrishnan. The film stars Prem Nazir, Sharada, Adoor Bhasi and Thikkurissy Sukumaran Nair. The film had musical score by G. Devarajan.

== Cast ==
- Prem Nazir
- Sharada
- Adoor Bhasi
- Thikkurissy Sukumaran Nair
- Kamala
- Baby Ajitha
- Kottarakkara Sreedharan Nair
- Master Narayanan
- Meena
- Jayabharathi (cameo role in the song 'ilaneere ilaneere)

== Soundtrack ==
The music was composed by G. Devarajan and the lyrics were written by Vayalar Ramavarma.

No.	Song	Singers	Lyrics	Length (m:ss)
1	"Aattin Manappurathe"	K. J. Yesudas	Vayalar Ramavarma	
2	"Ashtamangalya Thalikayumaay"	M. S. Padma	Vayalar Ramavarma	
3	"Attin Manappurathe" [D]	S. Janaki, A. M. Rajah	Vayalar Ramavarma	
4	"Ilaneere"	L. R. Anjali	Vayalar Ramavarma	
5	"Konchum Mozhikale"	K. J. Yesudas	Vayalar Ramavarma	
6	"Pandoru Kaalam"	Renuka	Vayalar Ramavarma	
