= Kodumudikal =

- Directed by: J. Sasikumar
- Written by: Chirayinkeezhu Ramakrishnan Nair
- Screenplay by: Chirayinkeezhu Ramakrishnan Nair
- Produced by: K. K. Nambiar
- Starring: Prem Nazir; Jayabharathi; Adoor Bhasi; Kanakadurga
- Cinematography: Rajkumar
- Edited by: K. Sankunni
- Music by: M. K. Arjunan
- Production company: Devi Jayasree Productions
- Distributed by: Devi Jayasree Productions
- Release date: 1 May 1981
- Country: India
- Language: Malayalam

Kodumudikal is a 1981 Indian Malayalam film, directed by J. Sasikumar and produced by K. K. Nambiar. The film stars Prem Nazir, Jayabharathi, Adoor Bhasi and Kanakadurga in the lead roles. The film has musical score by M. K. Arjunan.

== Plot ==
The story centers around the character of Sakavu Gopalan (Prem Nazir). He is a simple, ordinary man struggling to make ends meet for his family. His life takes an unexpected turn when he accidentally meets a wealthy woman, Sunanda (Jayabharathi). This encounter sets off a chain of events that significantly impact the lives of Gopalan and his family.

== Cast ==
- Prem Nazir as Sakavu Gopalan
- Jayabharathi as Sunanda
- Adoor Bhasi as Vasukuttan Pilla
- Kanakadurga as Chittamma
- Kuthiravattam Pappu as Nanappan
- M. G. Soman as Bava
- T. G. Ravi as Engineer Das
- Sathaar
- C. I. Paul as Jacob
- Thampi Kannanthanam
- Kaval Surendran
- Sreelatha Namboothiri as Ponnamma
- P. R. Varalakshmi
- Radhadevi
- Dhanya
- K.V.S Ilayath
- T.K Moorthi
- Prasadh
- Gopalakrishnan
- Devarajan
- Thaikadu rajan
- Dancer Thambi
- Jayan
- Rajamani
- Ramu Shasthamangalam
- C.M.S
- T.K.V Nair
- Balan
- Karunakaran
- Janarajan
- Sivarajan
- Ratheesh
- Rajakala
- Master Boban
- Baby Sheela

== Soundtrack ==
The music was composed by M. K. Arjunan and the lyrics were written by Pappanamkodu Lakshmanan.

No.	Song	Singers	Lyrics	Length (m:ss)
1	"Engo Ninnoru"	Rajan, Geetha	Pappanamkodu Lakshmanan	
2	"Inquilabin Makkal Njangal"	K. J. Yesudas	Pappanamkodu Lakshmanan	
3	"Radhe Radhe Kanmani Radhe"	K. J. Yesudas	Pappanamkodu Lakshmanan	

== See also ==
- Punnapra Vayalar (1968)
- Thulabharam (1968)
- Mooladhanam
- Ningalenne Communistakki (1970)
- Anubhavangal Paalichakal (1971)
- Neelakannukal
- Raktha Sakshi (1982)
- Mukhamukham (1984)
- Sakhavu (1986)
- Adimakal Udamakal (1987)
- Lal Salam (1990)
- Rakthasakshikal Sindabad (1998)

== View the film ==
{https://www.youtube.com/watch?v=_xT_NbRfZpQ KODUMUDIKAL}MALAYALAM FILM
