= Yakshi Paaru =

- Directed by: K. G. Rajasekharan
- Written by: K. G. Rajasekharan; Pappanamkodu Lakshmanan (dialogues)
- Screenplay by: Pappanamkodu Lakshmanan
- Produced by: Evershine
- Starring: Sheela; MG Soman; Kaviyoor Ponnamma; Hari
- Cinematography: C. Ramachandra Menon
- Edited by: K. Sankunni
- Music by: M. K. Arjunan
- Production company: Evershine
- Distributed by: Evershine
- Release date: 3 August 1979
- Country: India
- Language: Malayalam

Yakshi Paaru is a 1979 Indian Malayalam film, directed by K. G. Rajasekharan and produced by Evershine. The film stars Sheela, M. G. Soman, Kaviyoor Ponnamma and Hari in the lead roles. The film has musical score by M. K. Arjunan.

== Cast ==
- Sheela as Paru
- M. G. Soman as Rajan
- Kaviyoor Ponnamma as Wife of Thampi
- Hari
- Jose Prakash as Thampi
- Manavalan Joseph as Forest Guard
- Ambika
- Balan K. Nair as Irumban
- Janardanan as Shekharan
- K. P. Ummer
- Kunchan
- Kuthiravattam Pappu as Forest Guard
- Roja Ramani

== Soundtrack ==
The music was composed by M. K. Arjunan and the lyrics were written by Pappanamkodu Lakshmanan and Chirayinkeezhu Ramakrishnan Nair.

No.	Song	Singers	Lyrics	Length (m:ss)
1	"Aaromal Ponmakale"	Vani Jairam, Chorus	Pappanamkodu Lakshmanan	
2	"Manmadhapuriyile"	P. Jayachandran, Vani Jairam	Chirayinkeezhu Ramakrishnan Nair	
3	"Thathammappenninu"	Ambili	Chirayinkeezhu Ramakrishnan Nair	
