= Nammude Naadu =

Nammude Naade
- Directed by: K. Suku
- Written by: Pappanamkodu Lakshmanan
- Produced by: K. Suku
- Starring: Madhu; Jayabharathi; Urvashi; Balan K. Nair
- Cinematography: Jayanan Vincent
- Music by: Vidyadharan
- Release date: 1990
- Country: India
- Language: Malayalam

Nammude Naade is a 1990 Indian Malayalam-language film, produced and directed by K. Suku. The film stars Madhu, Jayabharathi, Urvashi and Balan K. Nair. The film has musical score by Vidyadharan.

== Cast ==
- Madhu as Krishna Menon
- Jayabharathi as Lakshmi, Wife of Krishna Menon
- Urvashi as Dr. Bindu
- Kuthiravattom Pappu as Driver Musthafa
- Balan K. Nair as Maliyekkal Chacko
- Lalu Alex as Collector Nandakumar
- Paravoor Bharathan as Ramachandran, Nandakumar's Father
- Vijayaraghavan as Balan
- P. K. Abraham as Shekharankutty, Farm Worker
- Prathapachandran as Prabhakara Panikkar
- Vincent as SI Gopinath
- Jagannatha Varma as DGP Anand Pillai
- Captain Raju as SP Devarajan IPS
- Janardanan as CI Joseph
- Sudheer as College Student

== Soundtrack ==
The music was composed by Vidyadharan and the lyrics were written by O. N. V. Kurup.

No.	Song	Singers	Lyrics	Length (m:ss)
1	"Enteyee Poonkudil"	K. J. Yesudas	O. N. V. Kurup	
2	"Madanappoonkula Pole"	K. S. Chithra	O. N. V. Kurup	
3	"Malayamaarutha Gaanalapam"	K. J. Yesudas	O. N. V. Kurup	
4	"Nammude Naadine"	M. G. Sreekumar	O. N. V. Kurup	
