= Kari Puranda Jeevithangal =

- Theatrical release poster
- Directed by: J. Sasikumar
- Written by: Pappanamkodu Lakshmanan
- Screenplay by: Pappanamkodu Lakshmanan
- Starring: Prem Nazir; Jayan; Jayabharathi; Jagathy Sreekumar
- Cinematography: Sai Prasad
- Edited by: K. Sankunni
- Music by: M. K. Arjunan
- Production company: Devi Jayasree Productions
- Distributed by: Devi Jayasree Productions
- Release date: 15 February 1980
- Country: India
- Language: Malayalam

Kari Puranda Jeevithangal is a 1980 Indian Malayalam film, directed by J. Sasikumar. The film stars Prem Nazir, Jayan, Jayabharathi and Jagathy Sreekumar in the lead roles. The film has musical score by M. K. Arjunan. This movie was later dubbed into Tamil-language as Meendum Savithri.

== Plot ==
Train Engine drivers Balan and Raghavan are best friends. Balan was an orphan who was taken up by Daniel an official at the Railways and is in love with his daughter Daisy. Raghavan is a widower with a small child. When Balan rescues Savitri from hoodlums and takes her home, he's turned off by Daniel who cuts off all ties with him. Balan settles in the Railway quarters with Savitri whom everybody assumes is his wife.Raghavan is shocked to see her at Balan's home, for Savitri is his own wife whom he had abandoned years ago. Savitri's mother was the madam at a brothel and Raghavan suspected that she had taken the same way.

In the present day, the situation grows fraught as a distraught Savitri tries to see her daughter. But Raghavan callously prevents her. But she's aided in her efforts by the tea-seller Mammookka who baby-sits the child. However, when Raghavan learns of it, he's furious. A fight erupts between Balan and Raghavan when the latter insults Savitri. She admits to the truth that Raghavan is her husband. Meanwhile, the child is kidnapped by hoodlums who are after Daisy, Balan's girl friend. Balan and Raghavan reunite to recover the child and the two friends and the two couples are reconciled.

== Cast ==
- Prem Nazir as Balan
- Jayan as Raghavan
- Jayabharathi as Savitri
- Jagathy Sreekumar as Kunjappan
- Adoor Bhasi as Mammookka
- Prameela
- Sreelatha Namboothiri as Sarojini
- T. R. Omana as Kamalakshiyamma
- Cochin Haneefa as Muthalali
- Balan K. Nair as Daniel
- C. I. Paul as Bhaskaran
- Sathyakala as Daisy
- Vanchiyoor Radha as Katrina

== Soundtrack ==
The music was composed by M. K. Arjunan and the lyrics were written by Chirayinkeezhu Ramakrishnan Nair.

No.	Song	Singers	Lyrics	Length (m:ss)
1	"Deepamundenkil"	K. J. Yesudas	Chirayinkeezhu Ramakrishnan Nair	
2	"Kudamullakkaavile"	P. Jayachandran, Ambili	Chirayinkeezhu Ramakrishnan Nair	
3	"Nimisham"	K. J. Yesudas	Chirayinkeezhu Ramakrishnan Nair	
4	"Shabdaprapancham"	S. Janaki	Chirayinkeezhu Ramakrishnan Nair	
