= Vijayanum Veeranum =

- Directed by: C. N. Venkita Swamy
- Written by: K. Padmanabhan Nair; Chirayinkeezhu Ramakrishnan Nair (dialogues)
- Starring: Prem Nazir; Seema; Jose Prakash; Shubha
- Music by: A. T. Ummer
- Production company: Chandrakala Pictures
- Distributed by: Chandrakala Pictures
- Release date: 5 July 1979
- Country: India
- Language: Malayalam

Vijayanum Veeranum is a 1979 Indian Malayalam film, directed by C. N. Venkita Swamy. The film stars Prem Nazir, Seema, Jose Prakash and Shubha in the lead roles. It became the South Indian movie with the second-highest budget at the time of its release. A. T. Ummer composed the musical score.

== Cast ==
- Prem Nazir as Vijayan & Veeran
- Seema as Maya
- Jose Prakash as Surendran Nair
- Shubha as Malini
- T. R. Omana
- Alummoodan as Appu
- Kunchan as Romeshi
- Elizabeth
- Janardanan as Prakash
- P. K. Abraham as Shivasankaran
- Jaggi as Appu
- A.T. Samuel(Sam)
- Rajashekaran

== Soundtrack ==
The music was composed by A. T. Ummer with lyrics written by Chirayinkeezhu Ramakrishnan Nair.

No.	Song	Singers	Lyrics	Length (m:ss)
1	"Maarijuvaana"	K. J. Yesudas, Chorus	Chirayinkeezhu Ramakrishnan Nair	
2	"Madyamo Maayayo"	S. Janaki	Chirayinkeezhu Ramakrishnan Nair	
3	"Mindaappennu"	K. J. Yesudas	Chirayinkeezhu Ramakrishnan Nair	
4	"Udyaanapushpame"	K. J. Yesudas, S. Janaki	Chirayinkeezhu Ramakrishnan Nair	
