= Aadharsam =

- Directed by: Joshiy
- Written by: Pappanamkodu Lakshmanan
- Produced by: M. D. George
- Starring: Prem Nazir; Jayabharathi; Srividya; Menaka
- Music by: Shyam
- Production company: Amala Arts
- Distributed by: Amala Arts
- Release date: 1 October 1982
- Country: India
- Language: Malayalam

Aadharsam is a 1982 Indian Malayalam-language film directed by Joshiy and produced by M. D. George. The film stars Prem Nazir, Jayabharathi, Srividya and Menaka in the lead roles. The film has musical score by Shyam.

== Cast ==
- Prem Nazir as Raveendran
- Jayabharathi as Sathi/Lakshmi
- Srividya as Sulochana
- Menaka as Malathi
- Sumalatha as Radha
- Sathaar as Rajan
- M. G. Soman as Mohan
- Cochin Haneefa as Babu
- Balan K. Nair as Jagadish/James
- Janardhanan as Varghese
- Thodupuzha Radhakrishnan as Manager Alex
- Prathapachandran as Police Commissioner
- Vanitha Krishnachandran as Simmy
- Sankaradi as Velu pilla
- Vanchiyoor Radha as Hostel Metron
- Jayamalini as dancer
- P. R. Menon as Groom's relative

== Soundtrack ==
The music was composed by Shyam and the lyrics were written by Bichu Thirumala.

No.	Song	Singers	Lyrics	Length (m:ss)
1	"Jeevan Pathanju Pongum"	K. J. Yesudas, S. Janaki, Chorus	Bichu Thirumala	
2	"Kannu Pothalle"	S. Janaki, Chorus	Bichu Thirumala	
3	"Laharikal Nurayumee"	S. Janaki	Bichu Thirumala	
4	"Swapnangal Than Chithayil"	K. J. Yesudas	Bichu Thirumala	
