= Ninakku Njaanum Enikku Neeyum =

- Directed by: J. Sasikumar
- Written by: Pappanamkodu Lakshmanan
- Screenplay by: Pappanamkodu Lakshmanan
- Produced by: Thiruppathi Chettiyar
- Starring: Prem Nazir; Jagathy Sreekumar; KPAC Lalitha; Sankaradi
- Cinematography: C. Ramachandra Menon
- Edited by: K. Sankunni
- Music by: V. Dakshinamoorthy
- Production company: Evershine Productions
- Distributed by: Evershine Productions
- Release date: 3 November 1978
- Country: India
- Language: Malayalam

Ninakku Njaanum Enikku Neeyum is a 1978 Indian Malayalam-language film, directed by J. Sasikumar and produced by Thiruppathi Chettiyar. The film stars Prem Nazir, Jagathy Sreekumar, KPAC Lalitha and Sankaradi in the lead roles. The film has musical score by V. Dakshinamoorthy.

== Cast ==
- Prem Nazir as Balan
- Jagathy Sreekumar as Babu
- KPAC Lalitha as Thankamma
- Sankaradi as Kurup
- Sreelatha Namboothiri as Pankajakshi
- Junior Ragini as Sarojini
- Baby Indira as Young Sarasvathi
- Baby Shanthi as Young Lakshmi
- Kuthiravattam Pappu as Kuttappan
- Meena as Bhargavi
- Ravikumar as Gopi
- Vanchiyoor Radha as Nun
- Vidhubala as Sarasvathi
- Bhavani as Lakshmi
- Pala Thankam as Hostel Matron Nun
- Master Joe as Young Kuttappan
- Master Sunil as Young Balan
- Ambili as Rajumon

== Soundtrack ==
The music was composed by V. Dakshinamoorthy and the lyrics were written by Chirayinkeezhu Ramakrishnan Nair and Pappanamkodu Lakshmanan.

No.	Song	Singers	Lyrics	Length (m:ss)
1	"Aayiram Raathri Pularnnaalum"	P. Jayachandran	Chirayinkeezhu Ramakrishnan Nair	
2	"Dukhangal Ethuvare"	K. J. Yesudas	Pappanamkodu Lakshmanan	
3	"Kalladikkum Ponnaliya"	P. Jayachandran, K. P. Brahmanandan	Chirayinkeezhu Ramakrishnan Nair	
4	"Veerabhageeradhan"	K. J. Yesudas	Pappanamkodu Lakshmanan	
