= Kanyaka (film) =

- Directed by: J. Sasikumar
- Written by: J. Sasikumar; M. R. Jose (dialogues)
- Screenplay by: M. R. Jose
- Starring: Madhu; Jayan; Jayabharathi; KPAC Lalitha
- Cinematography: Anandakuttan
- Edited by: K. Sankunni
- Music by: M. K. Arjunan
- Production company: Sree Sarkkareswari Films
- Distributed by: Sree Sarkkareswari Films
- Release date: 24 February 1978
- Country: India
- Language: Malayalam

Kanyaka is a 1978 Indian Malayalam-language film, directed by J. Sasikumar. The film stars Madhu, Jayan, Jayabharathi and KPAC Lalitha. The film has musical score by M. K. Arjunan.

== Cast ==
- Madhu as Sreekumar
- Jayan as Ayappan
- Sheela as Geetha
- Jayabharathi as Malathi
- KPAC Lalitha as Nandini
- Maniyanpilla Raju
- Thikkurissy Sukumaran Nair
- Sankaradi
- T. R. Omana as Bhavaniyamma
- Bahadoor as Aliyar
- Janardanan as Raghavan
- Nellikode Bhaskaran as Raman Nair
- Vanjiyoor Radha as Bivathu
- Sukumari as Madhaviyamma
- Paul Vengola as Pachu Pilla
- Thodupuzha Radhakrishnan as Thommi

== Soundtrack ==
The music was composed by M. K. Arjunan and the lyrics were written by Pappanamkodu Lakshmanan.

No.	Song	Singers	Lyrics	Length (m:ss)
1	"Aavanikkuda Choodunne"	K. J. Yesudas, Chorus	Pappanamkodu Lakshmanan	
2	"Enthinu Swarnamayoora"	K. J. Yesudas, Vani Jairam	Pappanamkodu Lakshmanan	
3	"Kanninum Kannaaya"	Ambili, C. O. Anto, Jolly Abraham	Pappanamkodu Lakshmanan	
4	"Maanaseshwara"	P. Susheela	Pappanamkodu Lakshmanan	
5	"Shaarikathenmozhikal"	P. Jayachandran, Ambili	Pappanamkodu Lakshmanan	
