= Chakravalam Chuvannappol =

- Poster
- Directed by: J. Sasikumar
- Screenplay by: Pavithran
- Story by: Ranka
- Starring: Prem Nazir; Mohanlal; Mammootty; Sumalatha
- Cinematography: R. R. Rajkumar
- Edited by: K. Sankunni
- Music by: M. K. Arjunan
- Production company: Soorya Productions
- Distributed by: Central Pictures
- Release date: 24 March 1983
- Country: India
- Language: Malayalam

Chakravalam Chuvannappol (transl. When the horizon turned red) is a 1983 Indian Malayalam-language drama film directed by J. Sasikumar. A remake of the Tamil-language film Keezh Vaanam Sivakkum (1981), the film stars Prem Nazir, Mohanlal, Mammootty, and Sumalatha. The film features music composed by M. K. Arjunan.

== Plot ==
Menon is a doctor, whose only daughter, Latha, has an incurable disease. He tries to conceal the same from her and his son-in-law, Suresh. One day a blind patient, Vasu, comes to see Menon to restore his sight so that he can avenge the death of his only sister by her lover who duped her. The patient shows him the photo and Menon is shocked to see it is none other than Suresh.

His daughter is sympathetic to the same patient, and she set on seeing the photo. From then on, it is a battle of wits between the father and daughter. Latha dies and her eyes are given to Vasu, who burns the photo of his sister's murderer.

== Cast ==
- Prem Nazir as Dr. Menon
- Mammootty as Vasu
- Mohanlal as Suresh
- Sumalatha as Latha
- Vanitha Krishnachandran as Prabha
- Jagathy Sreekumar as Thalavakkuzhi
- Baby Reena
- Bindulekha
- C. I. Paul as Dr. James
- Kaval Surendran
- Radhadevi

== Soundtrack ==
The music was composed by M. K. Arjunan and the lyrics were written by Chirayinkeezhu Ramakrishnan Nair.

No.	Song	Singers	Lyrics	Length
1	"Kuttathippenne"	Balagopalan Thampi	Chirayinkeezhu Ramakrishnan Nair	
2	"Ore Veenathan"	K. J. Yesudas	Chirayinkeezhu Ramakrishnan Nair	
3	"Panineer Thalikkunna"	Vani Jairam	Chirayinkeezhu Ramakrishnan Nair	
4	"Thaamarappoykaye"	K. J. Yesudas, Vani Jairam, Chorus	Chirayinkeezhu Ramakrishnan Nair	
