= Angam (1983 film) =

- Directed by: Joshiy
- Written by: Vietnamveedu Sundaram; Pappanamkodu Lakshmanan (dialogues)
- Screenplay by: Pappanamkodu Lakshmanan
- Starring: Prem Nazir; Madhu; Seema; Jagathy Sreekumar
- Cinematography: N. A. Thara
- Edited by: K. Sankunni
- Music by: Shankar–Ganesh
- Production company: Evershine Productions
- Distributed by: Evershine Productions
- Release date: 23 April 1983
- Country: India
- Language: Malayalam

Angam is a 1983 Indian Malayalam film, directed by Joshiy. The film stars Prem Nazir, Madhu, Seema and Jagathy Sreekumar in the lead roles. The film has musical score by Shankar–Ganesh. It was a remake of the Tamil film Gnana Oli, which was remade in Hindi as Devata and in Telugu as Chakravarthy.

== Cast ==
- Prem Nazir as Antony / William D'Cruz
- Madhu as Inspector Lawrence
- Seema as Marykkutti
- Jagathy Sreekumar as Ponnan
- Jose Prakash as Chacko
- Rajalakshmi as Tressa
- Shankar as Johnny
- Prathapachandran as Dr. Rehman
- Balan K. Nair as Father John
- Janardanan
- Kunchan as Chinnan
- P. R. Varalakshmi as Dr. Rehman's wife
- Raveendran as Rajan (Dubbing Chandramohan)
- Srividya as Thresya
- P. R. Menon... as Maash

== Soundtrack ==
The music was composed by Shankar–Ganesh and the lyrics were written by Pappanamkodu Lakshmanan.

No.	Song	Singers	Lyrics	Length (m:ss)
1	"Maankannu Thudichu	P. Jayachandran	Pappanamkodu Lakshmanan	
2	"Sharathkaalangal Ithal Choodunnatho"	P. Jayachandran, Vani Jairam	Pappanamkodu Lakshmanan	
