= Mulamoottil Adima =

- Poster
- Directed by: P. K. Joseph
- Written by: Pappanamkodu Lakshmanan
- Produced by: E. K. Thyagarajan
- Starring: Mohanlal; Mucherla Aruna; Janardanan; Surekha
- Cinematography: R. R. Rajkumar
- Edited by: K. Sankunni
- Music by: M. K. Arjunan; S. P. Venkatesh (Score)
- Production company: Sree Murugalaya Films
- Distributed by: Dinny Films
- Release date: 12 August 1985
- Country: India
- Language: Malayalam

Mulamoottil Adima is a 1985 Indian Malayalam-language period drama film directed by P. K. Joseph, written by Pappanamkodu Lakshmanan and produced by E. K. Thyagarajan. It is based on the life of Adimakannu / Mulamoottil Adima, an outlaw active in the Central Travancore region known for stealing from rich and giving to poor. The film stars Mohanlal in the title role, alongside Mucherla Aruna, Janardanan and Surekha. The film features songs composed by M. K. Arjunan and a score by S. P. Venkatesh.

== Cast ==
- Mohanlal as Adimakannu / Mulamoottil Adima
- M. G. Soman as Moideen
- Adoor Bhasi as Shiva Swamy
- Mucherla Aruna as Sainaba
- Santhosh as Abu
- Janardanan as Ibrahim
- C. I. Paul as Chembakaraman
- Surekha as Devamma
- Meena as Parvathiamma
- Jagathy Sreekumar as Lawrence
- G. K. Pillai as Hydraman
- P. R. Varalakshmi as Laila
- Stanly
- Murali Mohan
- Kaduvakulam Antony
- Jaffer Khan

== Soundtrack ==
The film's songs were composed by M. K. Arjunan and the lyrics were written by Pappanamkodu Lakshmanan, Devadas, and Cheramangalam. Film's score was composed by S. P. Venkatesh. Soundtrack album was released by Nisari Audios on 12 August 1985.

No.	Title	Lyrics	Singer(s)	Length
1.	"Ardhanaareeswara"	Devadas	Vani Jayaram	4:48
2.	"Aayiram Madanapo"	Pappanamkodu Lakshmanan	Lathika	5:12
3.	"Dhaaham"	Cheramangalam	Vani Jayaram	4:40
