= C. I. Paul =

Indian actor

- Born: 1944; Thrissur
- Died: 14 December 2005 (aged 61)
- Occupation: Actor
- Years active: 1967–2005

C. I. Paul (1944 – 14 December 2005) was a Malayalam film and television actor.

He was a member of the working party led by Fr. Vadakkan and came to acting through the famous dramas by V. L. Jose. He was well appreciated for his performance in Kalanilayam dramas.

His silver screen break came with Madatharuvi, in which he played the role of Fr Benedict. He acted in around 300 films and several TV serials since then. Paul, who started out as a character actor proved that he could handle comedy and villain roles with equal panache.

C. I. Paul died on 14 December 2005 in Thrissur due to heart failure.

== Filmography ==
=== 1960s ===
Year	Title	Role	Notes
1967	Madatharuvi	Fr. Benedict	
1967	Pavappettaval	Doctor	
1968	Vazhi Pizhacha Santhathi		

=== 1970s ===
Year	Title	Role	Notes
1975	Thomasleeha		
1976	Amba Ambika Ambalika	Emperor Shanthanu	
1977	Vidarunna Mottukal	Hassan	

=== 1980s ===
Year	Title	Role	Notes
1980	Chandrahasam	Shekaran	
1980	Ithikkara Pakky	Sayyippu	
1980	Kari Puranda Jeevithangal	Bhaskaran	
1980	Theenalangal	Robert	
1981	Thenum Vayambum	School Principal	
1981	Sangharsham		
1981	Nizhal Yudham	Sekhar	
1981	Kodumudikal	Jacob	
1982	Nagamadathu Thampuratti		
1982	Anuraagakkodathi	Shivaraman	
1982	Aayudham	Thambi	
1982	Thuranna Jail	Vaasu	
1982	Kazhumaram	John Robert	
1982	Aarambham	Dr. John	
1982	Kelkkaatha Sabdham	Sreemangalathu Narayana Pillai	
1983	Chakravalam Chuvannappol	Dr. James	
1983	Thaavalam	Gopalan contractor	
1983	Mahabali		
1983	Vaashi		
1983	Kolakomban	Unnithan	
1983	Coolie	Shekharan	
1983	Nanayam	Company Manager	
1983	Mortuary	Williams	
1983	Iniyenkilum	Police Officer	
1983	Bhookambam	Robert	
1984	Poochakkoru Mookkuthi	'Thenga' Govinda Pillai	
1984	Kurishuyudham	Paili	
1984	Enganeyundashaane	Viswanathan Menon	
1984	Kadamattathachan	Pathrose	
1984	NH 47	Bhargavan Pillai	
1984	Oru Kochukatha Aarum Parayatha Katha		
1984	Makale Mappu Tharu	Velayudhan	
1985	Uyirthezhunnelppu		
1985	Jeevante Jeevan	Master	
1985	Snehicha Kuttathinu		
1985	Pathamudayam	Bhadran	
1985	Aram + Aram = Kinnaram	Nandakumar	
1985	Mulamoottil Adima	Chempaka Raman Pilla	
1985	Akkare Ninnoru Maran	Groom's father	
1985	Ee Sabdam Innathe Sabdam	Advocate	
1985	Madhuvidhu Theerum Mumbe	Advocate	
1986	Iniyum Kurukshetrum	Balagangadharan	
1986	Mazha Peyyunnu Maddalam Kottunnu	KT Nair	
1986	Gandhinagar 2nd Street	Varkey	
1986	Aavanazhi	Chandrahasan	
1986	Nyayavidhi		
1986	Shobhraj		
1986	Hello My Dear Wrong Number	Police Commissioner Sathyanathan	
1987	Kaiyethum Doorathu		
1987	Yagagni		
1987	Nadodikkattu	Police Inspector	
1987	Naalkavala	Chackochan	
1987	Vrutham	Chandran Pillai	
1987	Naradhan Keralathil	Indran	
1988	Vellanakalude Nadu	Raghavan	
1988	Janmandharam	Bappu	
1988	Anuragi	Ummachan	
1988	Oru CBI Diary Kurippu	Minister	
1988	Abkari	Georgekutty	
1988	1921	Kunjikkoya Thangal	
1988	Mukthi	John Mathai	
1989	Vadakkunokkiyantram	Raghavan Nair	
1989	Moonnam Mura	Minister	
1989	Pradeshika Varthakal	Kallan Kochappi	
1989	Jagratha	Bhargavan	

=== 1990s ===
Year	Title	Role	Notes
1990	Kadathanadan Ambadi	Chandrappan's Brother	
1990	Samrajyam	Priest	
1990	Kalikkalam	Ambalakkadu Krishnan	
1991	Ganamela	Sahadevan	
1992	Maanthrika Cheppu	Madhusoodanan	
1992	Daddy	Constable Chacko	
1993	Samooham	Minister Narayanan Nair	
1993	Bhoomi Geetham	Chief Minister	
1993	Mithunam	Kannan, Chief Engineer	
1994	Varanamalyam	Minister	
1994	Pavithram	Punchiri's Husband	
1994	Manathe Kottaram	Sebastian Pettah	
1995	Tom & Jerry	Lazar	
1995	The King	Chacko	
1996	Aayiram Naavulla Ananthan	O. C. Pillai	
1996	Mahathma	DYSP Madhavan Nair	
1997	Mannadiar Penninu Chenkotta Checkan		
1997	Asuravamsam	Thattel Mani	
1997	Arjunan Pillayum Anchu Makkalum	'Jubba' Menon	
1999	The Godman	Bhargavan Pillai	
1999	Pallavur Devanarayanan	Rappayi	
1999	Deepasthambham Mahascharyam	Madhavan	
1999	Chandamama	Vakkachan	

=== 2000s ===
Year	Title	Role	Notes
2000	Darling Darling	Palathinkal Kurupu	
2001	Aakashathile Paravakal	President Raghavan	
2001	Uthaman	Kunjirama Menon	
2002	Thandavam	Raghavan Pillai	
2002	Pakalppooram	Rishikeshan Namboothiri	
2002	Yathrakarude Sradhakku	Pradeep's Father	
2003	Hariharan Pillai Happy Aanu	Sathyapalan	
2004	Thekkekkara Superfast	Priest	Film was made in 1996; Delayed release
2004	Youth Festival	Arjun's Father	
2005	Junior Senior	K. K. Nambiar	
2008	Magic Lamp	Balan Menon	Film was made in 2001; Posthumous release

=== 2010s ===
Year	Title	Role	Notes
2010	Pathinonnil Vyazham	Chandran Pillai	Film was made in 2005; Posthumous release
