= Sundarimaarude Swapnangal =

- Directed by: K. Shankar
- Written by: M. K. Mani; Pappanamkodu Lakshmanan (dialogues)
- Starring: Prem Nazir; Sharada; Jayabharathi; Thikkurissy Sukumaran Nair; Hema Choudhary
- Music by: M. S. Viswanathan
- Production company: Pankaj Arts
- Distributed by: Pankaj Arts
- Release date: 10 November 1978
- Country: India
- Language: Malayalam

Sundarimaarude Swapnangal is a 1978 Indian Malayalam-language film, directed by K. Shankar. The film stars Prem Nazir, Sharada, Jayabharathi and Thikkurissy Sukumaran Nair. The film has musical score by M. S. Viswanathan.

== Cast ==
- Prem Nazir
- Sharada
- Jayabharathi
- Thikkurissy Sukumaran Nair
- Hema Choudhary
- Bahadoor
- Sattar
- Shylaja

== Soundtrack ==
The music was composed by M. S. Viswanathan and the lyrics were written by Chirayinkeezhu Ramakrishnan Nair.

No.	Song	Singers	Lyrics	Length (m:ss)
1	"Aalolam Aalolam"	P. Jayachandran	Chirayinkeezhu Ramakrishnan Nair	
2	"Janmam Nediyathenthinu Seetha"	S. Janaki	Chirayinkeezhu Ramakrishnan Nair	
3	"Purana Kadhayile"	P. Jayachandran	Chirayinkeezhu Ramakrishnan Nair	
4	"Sundarimaarude"	M. S. Viswanathan	Chirayinkeezhu Ramakrishnan Nair	
