= P. R. Varalakshmi =

Indian actress

- Occupation: Actress
- Years active: 1971 - 2012; 2017 - Present

P. R. Varalakshmi is an Indian actress. She was active in movies during the 1970s and 1980s. She was a prominent lead actress during the 1980s in Tamil, Malayalam, Telugu, and Kannada films. She has acted around 600 movies in all major south Indian languages. Her debut film was Kettikaran in 1971, directed by H.S Venu.

She has acted with former Tamil Nadu Chief Minister MGR, former Tamil Nadu Chief minister Jayalalitha and Andhra Pradesh Chief Minister Rama Rao.

She has also acted with two Generations actors, with Muthuraman and his son Karthik, Sivaji Ganesan and his son Prabhu, Telugu star Krishna and his son Mahesh Babu. During her period she has acted as the heroine to famous heroes Gemini Ganesan, Kamal Haasan, AVM Rajan and so on.

== Filmography ==
=== Tamil ===
Year	Title	Role	Notes
1971	Kettikaran	Sivagami	
1971	Kulama Gunama	Dancer	
1972	Vazhaiyadi Vazhai		
1973	Ponvandu	Lakshmi	
1973	Deivamsam		
1973	Malai Naattu Mangai		
1973	Deiva Kuzhandhaigal		
1974	Ore Satchi		
1974	Naan Avanillai	Vijayasri	
1974	Swathi Nakshathram		
1974	Tiger Thathachari		
1975	Cinema Paithiyam	Kamala	
1975	Pattampoochi		
1975	Avalukku Aayiram Kangal		
1976	Dasavatharam	Parvati/Kali	
1976	Veedu Varai Uravu		
1977	Navarathinam	Maragadam	
1977	Kalamadi Kalam		
1977	Munnooru Naal		
1977	Punniyam Seithaval		
1978	Shri Kanchi Kamakshi		
1978	Manidharil Ithanai Nirangala!		
1978	Mela Thalangal		
1979	Mayandi		
1979	Nadagame Ulagam		
1979	Kandhar Alangaaram		
1980	Valli Mayil		
1980	Neer Nilam Neruppu		
1980	Raman Parasuraman		
1981	Kannadi		
1981	Sankarlal		
1981	Rajangam		
1983	Kalvadiyum Pookal		
1984	Sarithira Nayagan		
1984	Naanayam Illatha Naanayam	Maya	
1984	Anbe Odi Vaa	Mahesh's sister	
1985	Mayavi		
1985	Mayoori		
1986	Kanmaniye Pesu		
1986	Vidinja Kalyanam		
1988	Manamagale Vaa		
1988	Sakkarai Pandhal		
1989	Thaai Naadu	Sister	
1990	Pattanamthan Pogalamadi		
1990	Durga	Muthu's mother	
1990	Vaazhkai Chakkaram		
1992	Unna Nenachen Pattu Padichen	Chinna Thayi	
1992	Naane Varuven	Sathya's mother	
1994	Vaa Magale Vaa	Saraswathi	
1995	Jameen Kottai	Sujatha	
1996	Musthaffaa	Lakshmanan's mother	
1996	Poove Unakkaga	Lakshmi	
1997	Gopura Deepam		
1999	Thirupathi Ezhumalai Venkatesa	Alamelu	
1999	Rojavanam		
2000	Puthira Punithama		
2002	Padai Veetu Amman	Shankar's mother	
2005	Kaatrullavarai		
2007	Naan Avan Illai	Annamalai's foster mother	
2009	Innoruvan		
2019	Kannadi		
2024	Birthmark	Kundhavi	

=== Malayalam ===
Year	Title	Role	Notes
1966	Tharavattamma		
1971	Achante Bharya	Thankhamma	
1972	Panimudakku		
1973	Kaadu	Menon's daughter	
1974	Sreerama Hanumaan Yudham		
1976	Light House	Usha	
1977	Aval Oru Devaalayam		
1977	Ammaayi Amma		
1978	Beena	Malathy	
1978	Avalku Maranamilla		
1979	Ival Oru Naadody		
1979	Jimmy		
1979	Kazhukan	Pimp Mani's wife	
1979	Sukhathinte Pinnale	Kalyani	
1979	Aval Niraparathi		
1979	Irumbazhikal	Geetha	
1980	Oru Varsham Oru Maasam		
1980	Swattu		
1980	Lava	Rajasekharan's wife	
1980	Kodumudikal	Sarojini	
1981	Agnisaram		
1981	Ellaam Ninakku Vendi		
1982	Jumbulingam		
1982	Chambalkadu		
1982	Paanjajanyam		
1983	Kolakkomaban		
1983	Angam	Dr. Rehman's wife	
1983	Himam	Sharada	
1984	Manasse Ninakku Mangalam		
1985	Thozhil Allengil Jail		
1985	Mulamoottil Adima		
1985	Mayoori		
1990	Wait a Minute		
1992	Simhadhwani		
1997	Kulam	Ammayi	
2003	Janakeeyam	Surya's mother	

=== Telugu ===
Year	Title	Role	Notes
1969	Mathru Devata		
1971	Tahsildar Gari Ammayi		
1971	Kathanayakuralu	Radha	
1972	Koduku Kodalu	Vasundhara	
1972	Bhale Mosagadu		
1973	Neramu Siksha	Prabha	
1973	Dhanama? Daivama?	Shanti	
1974	Manushullo Devudu	Sudha	
1974	Inti Kodalu		
1975	Thota Ramudu		
1975	Jebu Donga		
1975	Maya Machindhra		
1975	Maa Voori Ganga		
1976	Ee Kalapu Pillalu		
1976	Sita Kalyanam	Sumitra	
1976	Bhakta Kannappa	Parvati	
1977	Dongalaku Donga		
1979	Maa Voori Devatha		
1979	Bottu Katuka		
1979	Namala Tatayya		
1980	Kaksha		
1980	Badai Basavayya		
1981	Swargam		
1981	Gadasari Atta Sogasari Kodalu		
1982	Andagaadu	Dhanalakshmi	
1982	Radha My Darling		
1982	Billa Ranga		
1982	Kalavari Samsaram	Sumathi	
1982	Kayyala Ammayi Kalavari Abbayi		
1982	Krishnavataram		
1983	Adavalle Aligithe	Rajeswari	
1983	Puli Debba		
1984	Railu Dopidi		
1985	Mayuri		
1985	Visha Kanya		
1985	Darja Donga		
1985	Moodila muchata		
1985	Pachani Kapuram		
1985	Maya Mohini		
1985	Koteeswarudu	Koulasya	
1986	Papikondalu		
1986	Prema Gharshana		
1987	Manmadha Leela Kamaraju Gola		
1987	Muddayi		
1987	Punnami Chandrudu		
1987	Srimathi Oka Bahumathi		
1987	Veera Viharam		
1988	Illu Illalu Pillalu		
1988	Station Master	Pushpa's mother	
1988	Chinnodu Peddodu		
1988	Pelli Chesi Choodu		
1988	Thodallullu		
1988	Aadade Aadharam		
1988	Sridevi Kamakshi Kataksham		
1989	Chennapatnam Chinnollu	Radha's mother	
1990	Idem Pellam Baboi		
1990	Magaadu		
1990	Papa Kosam		
1991	Kulamma Gunamma		
1992	Kalaratrilo Kannepilla		
1992	Samsarala Mechanic	Sumathi	
1992	Asadhyulu		
1993	Ankuram		
1995	Aadaalla Majaka		

=== Kannada ===
Year	Title	Role	Notes
1969	Chovkadha Deepa		Debut Film
1973	Bethadha Bairava		
1976	Rajanarthakiya Rahasya		
1976	Bengaluru Bhootha		
1984	Baddi Bangaramma		
1984	Police Papanna		
1988	Sangliyana		
1989	Avane Nanna Ganda		

=== Hindi ===
Year	Title	Role	Notes
1971	Parde Ke Peechey	Special appearance	
1972	Shehzada	Special appearance	
2001	Devi Durga Shakti		

== Television serials ==
Year	Serial	Role	Language	Channel
1999–2000	Idi Katha Kaadu		Telugu	ETV Telugu
2001–2002	Atthamma		Telugu	Gemini TV
2005–2006	Selvi	Saraswathi	Tamil	Sun TV
2007–2009	Arasi	Saraswathi	Tamil	Sun TV
2007–2010	Ammayi Kaapuram		Telugu	Gemini TV
2007–2008	Chellamadi Nee Enakku		Tamil	Sun TV
2010–2012	Chellamey	Visalatchi	Tamil	Sun TV
2017–2018	Ninaika Therintha Manamae	Kamakshi	Tamil	Star Vijay
2018–2019	Neelakuyil		Tamil	Star Vijay
2019	Yaaradi Nee Mohini	Kulagini	Tamil	Zee Tamil
2019–2020	Thenmozhi B. A.	Deivanai	Tamil	Star Vijay
2019–2022	Roja	Arulvakhu Amuthanayaki	Tamil	Sun TV
2021	Kaatrukenna Veli	Vennila's Grandmother	Tamil	Star Vijay
2021–2024	Sundari	Ganthimathi	Tamil	Sun TV
2022	Amman	Thaayamma	Tamil	Colors Tamil
2022	Pachakili		Tamil	Colors Tamil
2022	Ninaithale Inikkum	Special Appearance	Tamil	Zee Tamil
2023	Modhalum Kaadhalum		Tamil	Star Vijay
2023	Sandhya Raagam	Ramaniyamal	Tamil	Zee Tamil
