= Jayabharathi =

Indian actress

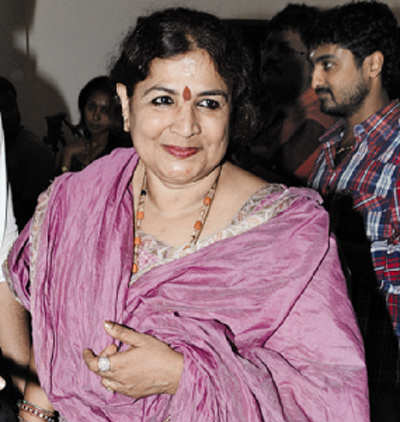
- Jayabharathi at a function
- Born: Lakshmi Bharathi; 28 June 1954 (age 72); Kollam, Kerala
- Spouse(s): Hari Pothan (m. 1974; div. 1976) Sathaar (m. 1979; div. 1987)
- Children: Krish J. Sathaar
- Parents: Shivasankaran Pillai; Sharada
- Relatives: Jayan (cousin)

Jayabharathi (born 28 June 1954 as Lekshmi Bharathi) is an Indian actress and two-time recipient of the Kerala State Film Award for Best Actress and National Film Award by Special Jury Award - Special Mention.

Jayabharathi's first leading role was given by director P. Bhaskaran for his movie Kattukurangu in 1969. Later, she became one of the most successful Malayalam film actresses and performed with notable leading men such as Prem Nazir, Madhu, Vincent, Jayan, M. G. Soman, Kamal Haasan and Rajinikanth. Jayabharathi-MG Soman was a popular on-screen pair of the 1970s and early 1980s. She won the Kerala State Film Awards for her performances in various films in 1972 and Madhavikutty in 1973. One of her famous films was Rathinirvedam, directed by Bharathan, which became one of the biggest box office hits in Kerala's history. It inspires similar productions all over South India, even decades after its release.

After undergoing training since the age of five under Kalamandalam Natarajan, Rajaram (a student of Vazhuvoor Ramaiah Pillai), and Vazhuvoor Samraj Pillai, Jayabharathi entered films as a teenager. Her life revolved around film studios, dance rehearsals, and stage performances. The actress is currently busy with her dance school, Aswathi Arts Academy, which she runs from home. She is also starting another one in Coimbatore. In 2003, Jayabharathi performed in nine temples in and around Kerala.

== Personal life ==
She was born Lakshmi Bharathi to Malayali Nair parents, Shivasankaran Pillai and Sharada. Her roots are in Kollam, Kerala and Malayalam actor Jayan was her first cousin (Jayabharathi's mother, Sharada Pillai, is the sister of Jayan's father, Madhavan Pillai).

She was married to film producer Hari Pothan for a brief period. She later married actor Sathaar in 1979 and they have a son Krish J. Sathaar (Unnikrishnan), born in 1984.

== Awards and honours ==
Year	Award	Award Category	Awarded Work
1990	National Film Awards	Special Jury Award / Special Mention	Marupakkam
1973	Kerala State Film Awards	Best Actress	Madhavikutty
1972	Kerala State Film Awards	Best Actress	Various films

== Filmography ==
=== Malayalam ===
==== 1960s ====
Year	Title	Role	Notes
1966	Kadamattathachan		
1966	Kanmanikal		
1966	Penmakkal		
1967	Kaanatha Veshangal		
1967	Khadeeja		
1967	Naadan Pennu	Sainabha	
1968	Kaliyalla Kalyanam		
1968	Velutha Kathreena	Rosa	
1968	Anchu Sundarikal		
1968	Padunna Puzha	Sharada	
1968	Vidyarthi		
1968	Kayalkkarayil		
1968	Viruthan Shanku	Kamakshi	
1968	Anaachadanam		
1968	Thokkukal Kadha Parayunnu	Thankam	
1969	Ballatha Pahayan	Salma	
1969	Urangatha Sundary	Madhumathi	
1969	Veettumrugam		
1969	Mooladhanam	Nabeesu	
1969	Virunnukari	Shantha	
1969	Nurse		
1969	Sandhya		
1969	Kattukurangu	Ambili	
1969	Rahasyam	Sulochana	
1969	Kadalpalam	Geetha	

==== 1970s ====
Year	Title	Role	Notes
1970	Kurukshethram		
1970	Sthree		
1970	Kakkathamburatti	Sarala	
1970	Madhuvidhu	Malini	
1970	Priya		
1970	Dathuputhran	Annakutty	
1970	Ammeyenna Sthree	Bindu	
1970	Ningalenne Communistakki	Maala	
1970	Detective 909 Keralathil		
1970	Nilakkatha Chalanangal		
1970	Thara	Usha	
1970	Anadha		
1970	Palunku Pathram		
1970	Thurakkatha Vathil	Nabeesa	
1970	Vivahitha	Sukumari	
1971	Vilakku Vangiya Veena	Sunanda	
1971	Oru Penninte Kadha	Thankamma	
1971	Gangasangamam	Molly	
1971	Kuttyedathi	Jaanu	
1971	Manpeda		
1971	Puthenveedu		
1971	Sarasayya	Sarala	
1971	Sindooracheppu	Ammalu	
1971	Moonnu Pookkal		
1971	Inquilab Sindabad	Vasanthi	
1971	Kalithozhi	Mallika	
1971	Avalalppam Vaikippoyi		
1971	Kochaniyathi	Indu	
1971	Achanum Bappyum	Sainaba/Amina	
1971	Linebus	Sarasamma	
1971	Karakanakadal	Marykutty	
1971	Vidhyarthigale Ithile Ithile		
1971	C.I.D. Nazir	Shanthi	
1972	Aradi Manninte Janmi	Sumathi	
1972	Sathi		
1972	Thottilla		
1972	Nrithashala	Priyamvadha	
1972	Azhimukam		
1972	Prathikaram	Shobha	
1972	Iniyoru Janmam Tharoo		
1972	Ananthasayanam		
1972	Aadhyathe Katha	Bhramin Ghost Lady	Guest appearance
1972	Akkarapacha	Janamma	
1972	Mayiladumkunnu	Lisa	
1972	Mappusakshi		
1972	Lakshyam		
1972	Manushyabandhangal	Nirmala	
1972	Oru Sundariyude Katha	Sundari	
1972	Punarjanmam	Radha, Aravindan's mother	
1973	Sasthram Jayichu Manushyan Thottu	Sulochana	
1973	Aaradhika	Hema	
1973	Gayathri		
1973	Poymughangal		
1973	Maram	Aamina	
1973	Divya Darshanam	Indira	
1973	Manushyaputhran	Madhavi	
1973	Enippadikal		
1973	Thiruvabharanam		
1973	Soundaryapooja		
1973	Madhavikutty		
1973	Kaliyugam		
1973	Masappady Mathupillai		
1973	Interview	Susheela	
1973	Yamini	Indira	
1973	Manassu		
1973	Thottavadi	Savithri	
1973	Nakhangal	Gomathi	
1973	Ladies Hostel	Lalli	
1973	Urvashi Bharathi		
1973	Kalachakram	Radha	
1973	Jesus	Veronica	
1973	Azhakulla Saleena	Selena	
1974	Pathiravum Pakalvelichavum		
1974	Rahasyarathri	Syamala	
1974	Swarnavigraham		
1974	Night Duty	Vimala	
1974	Neelakannukal	Malu	
1974	Thacholi Marumakan Chandu	Thekkumadom Maathu	
1974	Manyasree Vishwamithran	Padmam	
1974	Poonthenaruvi	Rosily	
1974	Chandrakantham	Rajani	
1974	Sethubandhanam	Latha	
1974	Neelakannukal	Malu	
1974	Pancha Thanthram	Sindhu/Rajkumari Sathi	
1974	Arakkallan Mukkalkkallan	Mangamma Rani	
1974	Ayalathe Sundari	Sreedevi	
1974	Bhoomidevi Pushpiniyayi	Indu	
1974	Rajahamsam	Radha	
1974	Adimakkachavadam	Sita	
1974	Nellu	Mala	
1975	Kaamam Krodham Moham		
1975	Sammanam	Vasanthi	
1975	Tourist Bunglow		
1975	Swarna Malsyam		
1975	Thamarathoni		
1975	Chief Guest		
1975	Hello Darling	Syamala	
1975	Priye Ninakku Vendi		
1975	Kottaram Vilkkanundu		
1975	Sooryavamsham		
1975	Dharmakshethre Kurushethre		
1975	Padmaraagam		
1975	Palazhi Madanam		
1975	Alibabayum 41 Kallanmarum	Margiyana	
1975	Love Marriage	Manju	
1975	Makkal		
1975	Pulivalu		
1975	Kalyana Sougandhikam		
1975	Chumaduthangi	Indu	
1975	Cheenavala	Pennal	
1975	Babu Mon	Indumathi	
1976	Sexilla Stundilla		
1976	Rathriyile Yathrakkar		
1976	Kayamkulam Kochunniyude Makan		
1976	Chennay Valarthiya Kutty		
1976	Nee Ente Lahari		
1976	Pushpasharam		
1976	Rajayogam		
1976	Manasaveena		
1976	Rajankanam		
1976	Ozhukkinethire		
1976	Vazhivilakku		
1976	Abhinandanam	Geetha	
1976	Seemanda Puthran		
1976	Ammini Ammavan	Ammini	
1976	Sindooram		
1976	Anubhavam	Mary	
1976	Sujatha		
1976	Agnipushpam	Reshmi	
1976	Appoppan	Bindu	
1976	Themmadi Velappan	Sindhu	
1976	Light House	Geetha	
1976	Prasadam	Sumathi	
1976	Kamadhenu	Lakshmi	
1976	Panchami	Panchami	
1976	Ayalkkari	Geetha	
1977	Sreemad Bagavadgeetha		
1977	Makam Piranna Manka		
1977	Bharyavijayam		
1977	Rajaparambara		
1977	Allahu Akbar		
1977	Pallavi		
1977	Yudhakandam		
1977	Aparajitha		
1977	Tholkkan Enikku Manassilla		
1977	Varadhakshina		
1977	Lakshmi	Nirmala	
1977	Sukradasa		
1977	Rathimanmadhan	Shalini	
1977	Karnaparvam		
1977	Thuruppu Gulan		
1977	Hridayame Sakshi		
1977	Manasoru Mayil		
1977	Ammayi Amma		
1977	Kavilamma		
1977	Aval Oru Devalayam		
1977	Panchamrutham	Stella	
1977	Samudram	Shobana	
1977	Anugraham	Jyothi	
1977	Aparadhi	Lissy	
1977	Itha Ivide Vare	Ammini	
1977	Randu Lokam	Radha	
1977	Kannapanunni	Kunjudevi	
1977	Guruvayoor Kesavan	Nandini Kutty	
1978	Aarum Anyaralla	Gracy	
1978	Rowdy Ramu	Vasanthy	
1978	Nakshathragale Kaval		
1978	Kanalkattakal	Rajani	
1978	Sundarimarude Swapnagal		
1978	Snehathinte Mukhangal	Lakshmi	
1978	Velluvili	Lakshmi	
1978	Avar Jeevikkunnu		
1978	Adimakkachavadam	Sita	
1978	Orkkuka Vellappozhum		
1978	Kanyaka	Malathi	
1978	Seemanthini		
1978	Lisa	Herself	
1978	Theerangal		
1978	Beena	Beena	
1978	Padmatheertham	Malini	
1978	Ashtamudikayal		
1978	Rathinirvedam	Rathi	
1978	Aval Vishvasthyayirunnu	Padmini	
1978	Balapareekshanam	Nirmala	
1978	Kadathanattu Makkam	Unniyamma	
1978	Midukki Ponnamma		
1978	Arum Anyaralla	Gracy	
1978	Mattoru Karnan		
1978	Mattoly	Radha	
1978	Mannu		
1978	Mudramothiram	Rani	
1978	Prarthana		
1978	Premashilpi	Bharathi	
1978	Kaathirunna Nimisham	Ramani/Devi	
1978	Kalpavrisham	Radhika/Rani	
1978	Jayikkanayi Janichavan		
1978	Ee Manohara Theeram	Sarada	
1978	Vadakakku Oru Hridayam	Aswathi	
1978	Njan Njan Matram	Devu	
1978	Itha Oru Manushyan	Ammini	
1978	Avakasham		
1978	Hemantharathri	Radha/Usha	
1979	Ankakkuri	Geetha	
1979	Kalliyankattu Neeli	Latha/Neeli	
1979	Upasana		
1979	Kannukal	Jalaja	
1979	Kathirmandapam		
1979	Vellayani Paramu	Lakshmikutty	
1979	Ival Oru Nadodi		
1979	Chuvanna Chirakukal	Stella Mathews	
1979	Pennorumbettaal		
1979	Rakthamillatha Manushyan	Rukmini	
1979	Sugathinu Pinnale	Rajani	
1979	Kalam Kaathuninnilla		
1979	Ivide Kattinu Sugantham	Indu	
1979	Anubhavangale Nandi		
1979	Ormayil Nee Mathram	Shanthi	
1979	Ishtapraneshwari		
1979	College Beauty		
1979	Indradhanusu	Sindhu	
1979	Manasa Vacha Karmana	Sumithra	
1979	Kayalum Kayarum	Jaanu	
1979	Itha Oru Theeram	Sudha	
1979	Irumbazhikal	Maya	
1979	Sayoojyam	Rama	
1979	Mochanam	Sreedevi	
1979	Puthiya Velicham	Lilly	

==== 1980s ====
Year	Title	Role	Notes
1980	Akalangalil Abhayam		
1980	Thirayum Theeravum	Savithri	
1980	Oru Varsham Oru Masam		
1980	Pralayam	Malathi	
1980	Ival Eevazhi Ithu Vare		
1980	Eden Thottam	Shantha	
1980	Ammayum Makalum	Bharathi	
1980	Palattu Kunjikannan	Aryamala	
1980	Chandra Bimbam	Rathi	
1980	Chandrahasam	Rama	
1980	Kadalkkaattu	Lisy	
1980	Karipurandajeevithangal	Savithri	
1980	Ithikkara Pakki		
1981	Itha Oru Dhikkari	Ramani	
1981	Ira Thedunna Manushyar		
1981	Swarnagal Swapnagal	Indira	
1981	Pathirasooryan	Rajani	
1981	Choothattam		
1981	Aakkramanam	Shanthi	
1981	Arikkari Ammu		
1981	Theekkali	Geetha	
1981	Kodumudikal	Sunantha	
1981	Agnisaram		
1981	Agni Yudham		
1981	Attimari	Lakshmi	
1981	Ariyappedatha Rahasyam	Geetha	
1982	Niram Marunna Nimishangal		
1982	Thuranna Jail	Thulasi	
1982	Aadharsam	Sathi/Lakshmi	
1982	Theeram Thedunna Thira		
1982	Jambulingam	Subhadra	
1982	Nagamadathu Thamburatti	Sathi Thampuratti	
1982	Njanonnu Parayatte	Bhargavi	
1983	Swapname Ninakku Nandi	Nabeesa	
1983	Thaavalam	Meenakshi	
1983	Mahabali		
1983	Prashnam Gurutharam	Dr. Sujatha	
1983	Sandhya Mayangum Neram	Yasodha	
1985	Madhuvidhu Theerum Mumbe		
1985	Kaanathaya Penkutty	Bharathi	
1986	Aval Kaathirunnu Avanum		
1987	Idanazhiyil Oru Kalocha	Parvathy	
1987	Manja Mantharangal	Sarah Thomas	
1987	January Oru Orma	Padmavathi	
1988	Ambalakkara Panjayath		
1988	Moonam Pakkam	Pachu's mother	
1988	Witness	Dr. Sridevi	
1988	Dhwani	Malathi	
1989	Dasharatham	Dr. Zeenat	
1989	Adharvam	Malu	

==== 1990s ====
Year	Title	Role	Notes
1990	Veena Meettiya Vilangukal		
1990	Aalasyam		
1990	Nammude Naadu	Lakshmi	
1990	No. 20 Madras Mail	Geetha	
1991	Vembanad		
1992	Ootty Pattanam	Lakshmi	
1993	Kanyakumariyil Oru Kavitha	Sathyabhama	
1994	Vishnu	Adv. Padmaja Menon	
1996	Man of the Match	Suhra	
1996	Kavadam		
1998	Sooryaputhran	Hema's mother	
1999	Ezhupunna Tharakan	Aswathi's aunt	

==== 2000s ====
Year	Title	Role	Notes
2000	Nakshathragal Parayathirunnathu	Sivaranjini's mother	
2002	Onnaman	Ravi's mother	

=== Tamil ===
Year	Title	Role	Notes
1966	Chinnanchiru Ulagam		
1966	Parakkum Pavai		
1967	Anubavi Raja Anubavi	Ramamani	
1967	Pesum Deivam	Suganthi	
1967	Raja Veetu Pillai	Anandhi	
1969	Suba Dhinam		
1970	Thalaivan		
1970	Namma Veettu Deivam		
1970	Dharisanam		
1971	Pudhiya Vazhkai	Vijaya	
1972	Enna Muthalali Sowkiyama		
1974	Naan Avanillai	Ammukutty	
1978	Kaadhal Vedham		
1979	Alavudinum Arbutha Vilakkum	Roshni	
1979	Pasi	Gowri	
1980	Saranam Ayyappa	Saraswathi	
1981	Mohana Punnagai	Radha	
1989	Varusham 16	Sundari	
1990	Michael Madana Kama Rajan	Sushila	
1990	Thangathin Thangam		
1990	Sirayil Pootha Chinna Malar	Chitra's mother	
1990	Madurai Veeran Enga Saami	Theivanai	
1990	Marupakkam	Janaki	
1991	Moondrezhuthil En Moochirukkum	Mary	
1992	Annai Vayal		
1992	Mudhal Kural		
1994	Ungal Anbu Thangachi		
1995	Muthu	Sivakamiyammal	
1996	Aavathum Pennale Azhivathum Pennale	Chandra	
1998	Aasai Thambi		

=== Telugu ===
Year	Title	Role	Notes
2006	Lakshmi	Lakshmi's mother	

=== Hindi ===
Year	Title	Role	Notes
1980	Pratishodh		
1992	Nagin Aur Lootere	Rajni	

== Television career ==
- Peythozhiyathe (Surya TV)
- Kottaipurathu Veedu (DD Podhigai)
- Nimmathi Ungal Choice
- Kilikkoodu (Asianet)
