= Kanalkattakal =

- Directed by: A. B. Raj
- Written by: Pappanamkodu Lakshmanan
- Screenplay by: Pappanamkodu Lakshmanan
- Produced by: Thomas Abraham
- Starring: Prem Nazir; Jayabharathi; Adoor Bhasi; Thikkurissy Sukumaran Nair
- Cinematography: C. Ramachandra Menon
- Music by: V. Dakshinamoorthy
- Production company: Salini Pictures
- Distributed by: Salini Pictures
- Release date: 27 May 1978
- Country: India
- Language: Malayalam

Kanalkattakal is a 1978 Indian Malayalam-language action film directed by A. B. Raj and produced by Thomas Abraham. The film stars Prem Nazir, Vincent, K. P. Ummer, Jayabharathi, Adoor Bhasi and Thikkurissy Sukumaran Nair. The film has musical score by V. Dakshinamoorthy.

== Cast ==
- Prem Nazir as Vijayan/Panikkar (Double Roll)
- Jayabharathi as Rajani
- Adoor Bhasi as Compounder
- Thikkurissy Sukumaran Nair as Mental Doctor
- Jose Prakash as Vikraman / Prasad
- T. R. Omana as Lakshmi
- Jayakumari
- K. P. Ummer as James / Rajan
- Paravoor Bharathan
- Vincent as Maaran / Venu
- Prathapachandran as Moopan
- Maniyanpilla Raju as Man at mental hospital
- Manavalan Joseph
- Paul Vengola
- Kaduvakkulam Antony
- Thodupuzha Radhakrishnan
- Aravindhakshan
- Murali Menon
- Santo Krishnan
- Balan
- Sudeer Kumar
- Sadana
- Vijaya Lakshmi
- Prema
- Lissi
- Daisy
- Jayanthi
- Radha Devi
- Baby Babitha
- Baby Vandhana
- Baby Lakshmi
- Master kumar
- Master Rajkumar

== Soundtrack ==
The music was composed by V. Dakshinamoorthy and the lyrics were written by Chirayinkeezhu Ramakrishnan Nair, Pappanamkodu Lakshmanan and P. Bhaskaran.

No.	Song	Singers	Lyrics	Length (m:ss)
1	"Aanandavalli Aayiravalli"	V. Dakshinamoorthy, Ambili	Chirayinkeezhu Ramakrishnan Nair, Pappanamkodu Lakshmanan	
2	"Ananthamaam Chakravaalam"	K. J. Yesudas	Chirayinkeezhu Ramakrishnan Nair, Pappanamkodu Lakshmanan	
3	"Elamani"	P. Susheela	P. Bhaskaran	
4	"Induvadane"	K. J. Yesudas	Chirayinkeezhu Ramakrishnan Nair, Pappanamkodu Lakshmanan	
5	"Manmadha Kadhayude"	[K. J. Yesudas	P. Bhaskaran	

== YouTube ==
- kanalkkattakal
