= Kaalam Kaathu Ninnilla =

1979 Indian Malayalam film directed by A. B. Raj

- Directed by: A. B. Raj
- Written by: Thoppil Bhasi
- Screenplay by: Thoppil Bhasi
- Produced by: TK Balachandran
- Starring: Prem Nazir; Jayabharathi; Sankaradi
- Cinematography: P. B. Mani
- Edited by: K. Narayanan
- Music by: A. T. Ummer
- Production company: Teakebees
- Distributed by: Teakebees
- Release date: 2 March 1979
- Country: India
- Language: Malayalam

Kaalam Kaathu Ninnilla is a 1979 Indian Malayalam film, directed by A. B. Raj and produced by T. K. Balachandran. The film stars Prem Nazir, Jayabharathi and Sankaradi in the lead roles. The film has musical score by A. T. Ummer.

== Cast ==
- Prem Nazir
- Jayabharathi
- Sankaradi
- Priya
- Sreelatha Namboothiri
- Poojappura Ravi
- Oduvil Unnikrishnan
- Vanchiyoor Radha

== Soundtrack ==
The music was composed by A. T. Ummer and the lyrics were written by Mankombu Gopalakrishnan and Chirayinkeezhu Ramakrishnan Nair.

| No. | Song | Singers | Lyrics | Length (m:ss) |
|---|---|---|---|---|
| 1 | "Bhagavathippattuduthu" | K. J. Yesudas | Mankombu Gopalakrishnan | |
| 2 | "Kanwa Kanyake" | Jolly Abraham | Chirayinkeezhu Ramakrishnan Nair | |
| 3 | "Manjalakalil" | Vani Jairam | Mankombu Gopalakrishnan | |
| 4 | "Mavelippaattinte" | K. J. Yesudas | Mankombu Gopalakrishnan | |
| 5 | "Punchiriyo" | P. Jayachandran | Mankombu Gopalakrishnan | |
| 6 | "Swargamundenkil" | Vani Jairam | Mankombu Gopalakrishnan | |
