= Nagamadathu Thampuratti =

- Directed by: J. Sasikumar
- Written by: N. Govindankutty; Pappanamkodu Lakshmanan (dialogues)
- Produced by: E. K. Thyagarajan
- Starring: Prem Nazir; Jayabharathi; Sankaradi
- Music by: M. K. Arjunan
- Production company: Sree Murugalaya Films
- Distributed by: Sree Murugalaya Films
- Release date: 8 January 1982
- Country: India
- Language: Malayalam

Nagamadathu Thampuratti is a 1982 Indian Malayalam film, directed by J. Sasikumar and produced by E. K. Thyagarajan. The film stars Prem Nazir, Jayabharathi, Sankaradi and Adoor Bhasi in the lead roles along with Meena, C I Paul, Jagathy Sreekumar, Unni Mary. The film has musical score by M. K. Arjunan. It was dubbed into Hindi as Nag Log.

== Cast ==
- Prem Nazir as Mannarkavu Jayadevan
- Jayabharathi as Nagamadathu Thampuratti (Sathi)
- Ravikumar as Veerabhadran
- Adoor Bhasi as Thamburan
- Meena Joseph as Thamburatti
- Jagathy Sreekumar as Devadathan
- Unnimary as Nagarani Chakshuki (Serpent queen)
- C. I. Paul as Iravikutty
- Sankaradi as Seshayya
- Alummoodan as Madampparampil Shakunan

== Soundtrack ==
The music was composed by M. K. Arjunan and the lyrics were written by Pappanamkodu Lakshmanan, Poovachal Khader and Devadas.

No.	Song	Singers	Lyrics	Length (m:ss)
1	"Aayilyam"	Chorus, Latha Raju, Zero Babu	Pappanamkodu Lakshmanan	
2	"Ethoru Karmavum"	K. J. Yesudas	Poovachal Khader	
3	"Maanmizhiyaal Manam Kavarnnu"	P. Jayachandran	Devadas	
4	"Somarasam Pakarum Lahari"	P. Susheela, Chorus	Pappanamkodu Lakshmanan	
