= Aadhyathe Katha =

1972 film

- Directed by: K. S. Sethumadhavan
- Written by: P. Kesavadev; Thoppil Bhasi (dialogues)
- Screenplay by: Thoppil Bhasi
- Produced by: K. S. R. Moorthy
- Starring: Prem Nazir; Vijayasree; Sujatha; Kaviyoor Ponnamma
- Cinematography: Masthan
- Edited by: T. R. Sreenivasalu
- Music by: M. K. Arjunan
- Production company: Chitranjali Studio
- Distributed by: Chithranjali
- Release date: 29 September 1972
- Country: India
- Language: Malayalam

Aadhyathe Katha is a 1972 Indian Malayalam film, directed by K. S. Sethumadhavan and produced by K. S. R. Moorthy. The film stars Prem Nazir, Vijayasree, Sujatha and Kaviyoor Ponnamma in the lead roles. The film had musical score by M. K. Arjunan.

It is the debut movie of Janardanan.

== Cast ==
- Prem Nazir as Soman
- Vijayasree as Rajakumari
- Sujatha as Nalini
- Jayabharathi (guest appearance) as ghost of Brahmin lady
- Kaviyoor Ponnamma as Ammukuttyamma
- Bahadoor as Kuttan Pillai
- Sreelatha Namboothiri as Leelamma
- Sreemoolanagaram Vijayan as Naanu Ammavan
- Sankaradi as Appu Pillai
- Adoor Pankajam as Appu Pillai's wife
- N. Govindankutty as Pankajakshan Pillai (a.k.a. Inquilab Pankan)
- Alummoodan as Padmanabhan Pillai
- Sarasamma as Kochukarthyayani
- Jameela Malik as Padmini
- Janardanan as Mohan
- Khadeeja as Kunjulakshmi teacher
- Jaya Gopalan as Sulochana
- Master Vijayakumar as Bhaskaran

== Soundtrack ==
The music was composed by M. K. Arjunan and the lyrics were written by Vayalar Ramavarma.

No.	Song	Singers	Lyrics	Length (m:ss)
1	"Aaluvaappuzhakkakare"	Latha Raju	Vayalar Ramavarma	
2	"Bhaamini Bhaamini"	K. J. Yesudas	Vayalar Ramavarma	
3	"Hare Krishna Hare Krishna"	P. Susheela	Vayalar Ramavarma	
4	"Ottuvalayedukkaan"	P. Susheela	Vayalar Ramavarma	
5	"Shukrachaaryarude"	P. Susheela	Vayalar Ramavarma	
