= Kolakomban =

- Theatrical release poster
- Directed by: J. Sasikumar
- Written by: A. D. Rajan
- Screenplay by: Pappanamkodu Lakshmanan
- Produced by: J. Sasikumar
- Starring: Mohanlal; M. G. Soman; Manavalan Joseph; Menaka; Prathapachandran
- Cinematography: N. A. Thara
- Edited by: K. Sankunni
- Music by: Johnson
- Production company: Rajakala Films
- Distributed by: Soori Release
- Release date: 12 November 1983
- Country: India
- Language: Malayalam

Kolakomban (transl. Deadly Tusker) is a 1983 Indian Malayalam-language film directed and produced by J. Sasikumar. The film stars Mohanlal, M. G. Soman, Manavalan Joseph, Menaka and Prathapachandran. The film features a musical score by Johnson.

== Cast ==
- Mohanlal as Gopi
- M. G. Soman as Khalid
- Manavalan Joseph
- Menaka
- Prathapachandran
- Alummoodan as Mathai
- C. I. Paul as Unnithan
- Mala Aravindan
- Rajeshwari
- T. G. Ravi as Velu
- Varalakshmi

== Soundtrack ==
The music was composed by Johnson and the lyrics were written by A. D. Rajan.

No.	Song	Singers	Lyrics	Length (m:ss)
1	"Poonkili Painkili"	J. M. Raju, Lathika	A. D. Rajan	
2	"Prakrithi Neerattu Kazhinju"	Unni Menon	A. D. Rajan	
