= Prarthana (1978 film) =

- Directed by: A. B. Raj
- Written by: T. K. Balachandran; Pappanamkodu Lakshmanan (dialogues)
- Screenplay by: Pappanamkodu Lakshmanan
- Produced by: T. K. Balachandran
- Starring: Prem Nazir; Jayabharathi; Kaviyoor Ponnamma; Sankaradi
- Cinematography: Kanniyappan
- Edited by: K. Narayanan
- Music by: V. Dakshinamoorthy
- Production company: Teakebees
- Distributed by: Teakebees
- Release date: 11 February 1978
- Country: India
- Language: Malayalam

Prarthana is a 1978 Indian Malayalam-language film, directed by A. B. Raj and produced by T. K. Balachandran. The film stars Prem Nazir, Jayabharathi, Kaviyoor Ponnamma and Sankaradi. The film's score was composed by V. Dakshinamoorthy.

== Cast ==
- Prem Nazir
- Jayabharathi
- Kaviyoor Ponnamma
- Sankaradi
- Sukumaran
- Poojappura Ravi
- Reena

== Soundtrack ==
The music was composed by V. Dakshinamoorthy with lyrics by Mankombu Gopalakrishnan.

No.	Song	Singers	Lyrics	Length (m:ss)
1	"Aadi Jeevakanam"	K. J. Yesudas	Mankombu Gopalakrishnan	
2	"Aashamsakal"	P. Susheela	Mankombu Gopalakrishnan	
3	"Chaarumukhi Ninnenokki"	K. J. Yesudas	Mankombu Gopalakrishnan	
4	"Ente Manoradhathile"	K. J. Yesudas	Mankombu Gopalakrishnan	
