= Prasaadam =

- Directed by: A. B. Raj
- Written by: S. L. Puram Sadanandan
- Screenplay by: S. L. Puram Sadanandan
- Produced by: T. K. Balachandran
- Starring: Prem Nazir; Jayabharathi; KPAC Lalitha; Adoor Bhasi
- Cinematography: Kanniyappan
- Edited by: K. Narayanan
- Music by: V. Dakshinamoorthy
- Production company: Teakebees
- Distributed by: Teakebees
- Release date: 1 April 1976
- Country: India
- Language: Malayalam

Prasaadam is a 1976 Indian Malayalam-language film directed by A. B. Raj and produced by T. K. Balachandran. The film stars Prem Nazir, Jayabharathi, K. P. A. C. Lalitha and Adoor Bhasi. The score was composed by V. Dakshinamoorthy.

== Cast ==
- Prem Nazir as Shankarankutty
- Jayabharathi as Sumathi
- KPAC Lalitha as Bhageerathi
- Adoor Bhasi as Dr. Dussasanan
- Sankaradi as Gopalappilla
- Sreelatha Namboothiri as nurse
- Bahadoor as attender
- Janardanan as Sukumaran
- govindankutty as Oochaali Keshavan
- muthukulam as broker Pachupilla
- Reena as Meenakshi
- TK Balachandran as Chellappan
- khadeeja as Shankari

== Soundtrack ==
The music was composed by V. Dakshinamoorthy with lyrics by P. Bhaskaran.

No.	Song	Singers	Lyrics	Length (m:ss)
1	"Gaanathin Kalloliniyil"	Vani Jairam	P. Bhaskaran	
2	"Haritha Kaanana"	P. Jayachandran, Ambili	P. Bhaskaran	
3	"Pulayanar Maniyamma"	K. J. Yesudas	P. Bhaskaran	
4	"Pulayanar Maniyamma"	S. Janaki	P. Bhaskaran	
5	"Udara Vedana" (Vaatham Pitham)	K. J. Yesudas	P. Bhaskaran	
