= Thaavalam =

- Directed by: Thampi Kannanthanam
- Written by: Thampi Kannanthanam; Pappanamkodu Lakshmanan (dialogues)
- Screenplay by: Pappanamkodu Lakshmanan
- Produced by: Koshi Ninan; Philip Maryvilla
- Starring: M. G. Soman; Mohanlal; Shubha; Menaka
- Cinematography: Rajkumar
- Edited by: K. Sankunni
- Music by: Johnson
- Production company: Sargadhara Cine Movies
- Distributed by: Sargadhara Cine Movies
- Release date: 25 March 1983
- Country: India
- Language: Malayalam

Thaavalam is a 1983 Indian Malayalam film, directed by Thampi Kannanthanam and produced by Koshi Ninan and Philip Maryvilla. The film stars M. G. Soman, Mohanlal, Jayabharathi, Shubha and Menaka in the lead roles. The film has musical score by Johnson.

== Cast ==
- Jayabharathi
- Mohanlal
- Shubha
- Menaka
- Balan K. Nair
- C. I. Paul
- Kuthiravattam Pappu
- M. G. Soman
- Mala Aravindan
- Ravikumar
- Uma Bharani
- Raveendran

== Soundtrack ==
The music was composed by Johnson and the lyrics were written by Poovachal Khader.

No.	Song	Singers	Lyrics	Length (m:ss)
1	"Arimullaykkum Chiri Vannu"	S. Janaki	Poovachal Khader	
2	"Gandham Purusha Gandham"	S. Janaki	Poovachal Khader	
3	"Oro Paravayum"	K. J. Yesudas, Chorus	Poovachal Khader	
4	"Shilayil Ninnoru"	P. Susheela, P. Jayachandran	Poovachal Khader	
5	"Shilayil Ninnoru Sangeetham"	K. J. Yesudas	Poovachal Khader	
