= Indradhanussu =

- Directed by: K. G. Rajasekharan
- Starring: Prem Nazir; Jayabharathi; K. P. Ummer
- Music by: M. S. Viswanathan
- Release date: 1979
- Country: India
- Language: Malayalam

Indradhanussu is a 1979 Indian Malayalam film, directed by K. G. Rajasekharan.

== Cast ==
- Prem Nazir as Gopi
- Jayabharathi as Sindhu
- Manavalan Joseph as Mathai
- K. P. Ummer as Menon
- T. R. Omana as Janakiyamma
- Balan K Nair as Mammad
- Sathaar as Inspector Nair
- Jose Prakash as Karuppai
- Nellikode Bhaskaran as Govindan
- P. K. Abraham as Balan Mashu
- Pattom Sadan as Sankarankutty
- Kunchan as Kuttappan
- Sadhana as Annamma
- Janardhanan as Inspector Babu
- Priya as Nirmala

== Soundtrack ==
lyrics :Chirayinkeezhu Ramakrishnan Nair
music :M.S. Viswanathan

No	song	singer	raga
1	Allah Allah (Padachonte Kayyile)	Ambili, Jolly Abraham, Chorus	
2	I'll sing for you	L. R. Eswari, Pattom Sadan	
3	Pakalkkiliyorukkiya	P. Jayachandran	
4	Vijayam vijayam	P. Jayachandran P. Leela Ambili	
