= Ammaayi Amma =

- Directed by: M. Masthan
- Written by: Pappanamkodu Lakshmanan
- Screenplay by: Pappanamkodu Lakshmanan
- Produced by: Harifa Rasheed
- Starring: Sukumari; Jayabharathi; Adoor Bhasi; Ashalatha
- Cinematography: K. N. Sai
- Edited by: K. Sankunni
- Music by: A. T. Ummer
- Production company: HR Combines
- Distributed by: HR Combines
- Release date: 15 September 1977
- Country: India
- Language: Malayalam

Ammaayi Amma is a 1977 Indian Malayalam film, directed by M. Masthan and produced by Harifa Rasheed. The film stars Sukumari, Jayabharathi, Adoor Bhasi and Ashalatha in the lead roles. The film has musical score by A. T. Ummer.

== Cast ==
- Sukumari
- Jayabharathi
- Adoor Bhasi
- Ashalatha
- Pattom Sadan
- Sankaradi
- Sreelatha Namboothiri
- Prathapachandran
- Kanchana
- M. G. Soman
- Meena
- P. K. Venukkuttan Nair
- P. R. Varalakshmi
- Sreekala (Rathidevi)
- Vincent

== Soundtrack ==
The music was composed by A. T. Ummer and the lyrics were written by Anukuttan.

No.	Song	Singers	Lyrics	Length (m:ss)
1	"Aattinkutti Thullichaadi"	S. Janaki	Anukuttan	
2	"Krishna Jagannaadha"	P. Susheela	Anukuttan	
3	"Mazhavil Maanathinte Maaril"	K. J. Yesudas, S. Janaki	Anukuttan	
