= Sayoojyam =

- Directed by: G.Prem Kumar
- Written by: T. K. Prasad; Pappanamkodu Lakshmanan (dialogues)
- Screenplay by: Pappanamkodu Lakshmanan
- Produced by: Sukuprasad
- Starring: Jayabharathi; MG Soman; Jayan; Thikkurissy Sukumaran Nair
- Cinematography: G. V. Suresh
- Edited by: K. Narayanan
- Music by: K. J. Joy
- Production company: Aksharachithra
- Distributed by: Aksharachithra
- Release date: 20 July 1979
- Country: India
- Language: Malayalam

Sayoojyam is a 1979 Indian Malayalam-language film, directed by G. Premkumar and produced by Sukuprasad. The film stars Jayabharathi, M. G. Soman, Jayan and Thikkurissy Sukumaran Nair. The film has musical score by K. J. Joy.

== Plot ==
Rama believes that her lover Balan and child are dead. She is persuaded by her parents to marry Rajan. Unfortunately she can't conceive a second time.She's shocked when Rajan brings his blind friend home for treatment -for he is none other than her old lover. She also learns that her child is in fact alive and in an orphanage. She begins visiting the child secretly. When Rajan learns the truth he forbids her from seeing the child again. But when her son falls sick and calls for her, she has to break all promises to run to his bedside. Rajan accepts Rama's son as his own and brings his wife and child home.

== Cast ==
- Jayabharathi as Rama
- MG Soman as Balan
- Jayan as Rajan
- Thikkurissy Sukumaran Nair as Madhavan Thampi (Rama's Father)
- Sreelatha Namboothiri as Aamina
- T. R. Omana as Balan's Mother
- Aranmula Ponnamma as Lakshmi Amma (Rama's Mother)
- K. P. A. C. Azeez as Raghavan
- Jalaja as Radha
- Poojappura Ravi
- Kollam G. K. Pillai

== Soundtrack ==
The music was composed by K. J. Joy and the lyrics were written by Yusufali Kechery.

No.	Song	Singers	Length (m:ss)
1	"Kaalithozhuthil"	P. Susheela, Chorus	
2	"Maranjirunnaalum" (F)	Vani Jairam	
3	"Maranjirunnaalum" (M)	K. J. Yesudas	
4	"Swargathilekko"	P. Jayachandran	

== view film ==
- saayoojyam 1979
