= NH 47 (film) =

1984 film directed by Baby

- Directed by: Baby
- Written by: Saj Movies; Pappanamkodu Lakshmanan (dialogues)
- Screenplay by: Pappanamkodu Lakshmanan
- Produced by: Sajan
- Starring: Sukumaran; T. G. Ravi; Lalu Alex; Balan K. Nair; Jagathy Sreekumar; C. I. Paul; Jose; Shubha; Prathapachandran
- Cinematography: K. B. Dayalan
- Edited by: K. Sankunni
- Music by: Shyam
- Production company: Saj Productions
- Distributed by: Saj Productions
- Release date: May 19, 1984 (India)
- Country: India
- Language: Malayalam

NH 47 is a 1984 Indian Malayalam-language crime Thriller film, directed by Baby and produced by Sajan. The film stars TG Ravi, Sukumaran, Balan K Nair, CI Paul, Jose, Shubha and Prathapachandran. The film has musical score by Shyam. Sukumaran played as the victim Chacko of the notorious Chacko Murder Case that shook Kerala and T. G. Ravi played the character of Sukumara Kurup, who allegedly plotted the murder.

Even though in real life, Kurup still remains untraced, the film showed that he was caught by the Police.

== Plot ==
Sudhakaran Pilla, a businessman arrives from the Gulf for the housewarming of his new house under construction. His subordinate Sunny accompanies him from the Gulf. Thankappan, Sudhakaran Pillai's driver stays with his mother Gauriyamma and daughter Mini. Rahim, a medical representative, is Thankappan's neighbour and stays with his wife Nazeera and father-in-law Khaderikka. Ramani is the younger sister of Sudhakaran Pillai's wife Sumathi. Ramani's husband Bhargavan Pilla is not on good terms with Sudhakaran Pillai as he had borrowed money from him long ago and has not returned it till now. Moreover they done a illicit affair without bhargavan's knowledge.

In the meanwhile, Sunny makes a short visit to his house near the beach. Sunny's father was a fisherman and has three daughters, the elder being Elsy, who is still not married owing to their poor financial circumstance. After an injury that disabled one of his hands, Sunny's father is not able to go to work and they have a terrible time making a living. They were heartbroken after finding that Sunny did not bring anything for them in their visit. Sunny tells them that once he receives the money that Sudhakaran Pillai had promised to give him, he will settle all financial problems. That night, Sunny was shocked to find out that Elsy was spending nights with another man in that area who was funding his family in return.

Things take a turn on one midnight when the police get informed that a car is set on fire on the National Highway. It was found that the person in drivers seat is burnt to death. Police has some suspicion on finding the presence of gloves near the burnt car. From the confirmation provided by Bhargavan Pilla, police infer that it is Sudhakaran Pillai, and they bury the body as per custom (if one's mother is alive, the body cannot be cremated, and it has to be buried).

S. I. Johnson, the main investigator behind the case, takes the suspected persons under custody and finds out that it was Rahim who was burnt to death instead of Sudhakaran Pillai. The plan was constructed by Sudhakaran Pillai whose main aim was to get the compensation from the Dubai-based company where Sudhakaran Pillai was employed. Sudhakaran Pillai consults an advocate to debate his case, however the advocate refuses. Finally the crowd punishes Sudhakaran Pillai.

== Cast ==
- T. G. Ravi as Sudhakara Pillai
- Sukumaran as Rahim (Chacko)
- Sreenath as Sunny
- Jagathy Sreekumar as Pushpangathan
- Balan K. Nair as Thankappan
- C. I. Paul as Bhargavan Pillai
- Jose as Alikunju
- Shubha as Ramani
- Prathapachandran as Advocate
- Baby Shalini as Mini
- Harippad Soman
- Jalaja as Nazeera
- Kunjandi as Sunny's father
- Lalu Alex as SI Johnson
- Mala Aravindan as PC Velu Pilla
- Nanditha Bose as Sumathi
- Nellikode Bhaskaran as Khaderikka
- Philomina as Sudhakaran's mother
- Sathyakala as Elsy
- Vallathol Unnikrishnan as P. C. Purushu
- Radhadevi as Gauriyamma/Thankappan's mother

== Music ==
The music was composed by Shyam and the lyrics were written by Poovachal Khader.

No.	Song	Singers	Lyrics	Length (m:ss)
1	"Allah Allah Allah"	K. J. Yesudas, Poovachal Khader, C. A. Aboobacker	Poovachal Khader	
2	"Kannukondu Kessezhuthum"	K. J. Yesudas, Chorus	Poovachal Khader	
3	"Punnarapoomanimaran"	S. Janaki	Poovachal Khader	
