= Oottyppattanam =

- Poster
- Directed by: Haridas
- Written by: Rajan Kiriyath; Vinu Kiriyath
- Produced by: A. R. Rajan
- Starring: Jayaram; Siddique; Jagathy Sreekumar; Easwari Rao; Narendra Prasad; Jayabharathi; Anju
- Cinematography: Prathapan
- Edited by: G. Murali
- Music by: Johnson; Gireesh Puthenchery (lyrics)
- Production companies: G. K. Films; Malayalam Films
- Distributed by: Manorajyam Films
- Release date: 1992
- Country: India
- Language: Malayalam

Oottyppattanam (Ootty Town) is a 1992 Malayalam-language comedy drama film directed by Haridas and starring Jayaram, Siddique, Jagathy Sreekumar, Easwari Rao, Narendra Prasad, Jayabharathi and Anju in pivotal roles.

== Plot ==
Prince Rajasekharan is without an heir and decides to adopt a brave man from a royal family to inherit his property. He faces many challenges when several people turn up wanting to be adopted.

== Cast ==
- Jayaram as Pavithran
- Siddique as Jimmy
- Jagathy Sreekumar as Basheer
- Easwari Rao as Seena/Ranjini Thampuratti
- Narendra Prasad as Rajasekhara varma
- Jayabharathi as Lakshmi/Rajasekhara Varma's wife
- Babu Namboothiri as Surya Namboothiri
- Mahesh Anand as Dharmaraj
- Augustine as Shinkaravelan
- K. B. Ganesh Kumar as murdered prince Ramavarma
- Anju as deceased princess
- Janardhanan as Advocate Bhaskaran
- Zainuddin as man arriving to be adopted
- Mala Aravindan as Kannan, driver
- Philomina as Narayani Amma
- Krishnankutty Nair as Santhosh, policeman
