= Theenalangal =

Theenaalangal
- Directed by: J. Sasikumar
- Written by: Pappanamkodu Lakshmanan
- Screenplay by: Pappanamkodu Lakshmanan
- Starring: Jayan; Sheela; Ravikumar; Seema
- Edited by: G. Venkittaraman
- Music by: M. K. Arjunan
- Production company: Parvathi Arts Pictures
- Distributed by: Parvathi Arts Pictures
- Release date: 25 April 1980
- Country: India
- Language: Malayalam

Theenaalangal is a 1980 Indian Malayalam film, directed by J. Sasikumar. The film stars Jayan, Sheela, Ravikumar and Seema in the lead roles. Its musical score is by M. K. Arjunan.

== Cast ==
- Jayan as Ramu
- Sheela as Devamma
- Ravikumar as Babu (Police Officer)
- Seema as Raji
- Master Raghu
- Janardhanan as Madhavan/Raja Shekaran
- C. I. Paul as Robert
- K. P. A. C. Sunny as Damodaran Master
- Prathapachandran as Priest
- Maniyanpilla Raju as Appu Servant
- Thodupuzha Radhakrishnan
- Poojappura Ravi as Kunjappan
- Sadhana
- G.K. Pilla
- Peethambaran
- Sukumaran
- Bapukutty
- Sebastiann Kariyil
- Vanchiyoor Radha
- Cherthala Thankam
- Cherthala Sumathi

== Soundtrack ==
The music was composed by M. K. Arjunan.

No.	Song	Singers	Lyrics	Length (m:ss)
1	"Galeeliyaa Raajanandini"	K. J. Yesudas, Chorus	Pappanamkodu Lakshmanan	
2	"Neerchola Paadunna"	K. J. Yesudas	Pappanamkodu Lakshmanan	
3	"Pookkurunji"	Vani Jayaram	Pappanamkodu Lakshmanan	
4	"Saaradhimaar Ningal"	K. J. Yesudas, Chorus	Pappanamkodu Lakshmanan	
