= Rathimanmadhan =

- Directed by: J. Sasikumar
- Screenplay by: Pappanamkodu Lakshmanan
- Produced by: M. A. Rahman; Naseema Kabeer
- Starring: Prem Nazir; Jayabharathi; Jayan; Sukumari
- Cinematography: J. Williams
- Edited by: K. Narayanan
- Music by: M. S. Viswanathan
- Production company: Manoj Movie Makers
- Distributed by: Manoj Movie Makers
- Release date: 18 November 1977
- Country: India
- Language: Malayalam

Rathimanmadhan is a 1977 Indian Malayalam-language film, directed by J. Sasikumar and produced by M. A. Rahman and Naseema Kabeer. The film stars Prem Nazir, Jayabharathi, Jayan and Sukumari. The film has musical score by M. S. Viswanathan. The film was a remake of Tamil film Kumari Penn.

== Cast ==
- Prem Nazir as Maran / Sreekumar
- Jayabharathi as Shalini
- Jayan as Sekharan
- Sukumari as Gomathi
- Adoor Bhasi as Dassapan
- Thikkurissy Sukumaran Nair as Thampi
- Sankaradi as Kuruppu
- Sreelatha Namboothiri
- T. R. Omana
- Cochin Haneefa
- Paul Vengola
- Bahadoor as Dr Keshava Pilla
- KPAC Sunny
- Kunchan
- Meena
- T. P. Madhavan

== Soundtrack ==
The music was composed by M. S. Viswanathan and the lyrics were written by Pappanamkodu Lakshmanan.

| No. | Song | Singers | Lyrics | Length (m:ss) |
|---|---|---|---|---|
| 1 | "Jaagre Jaa" (Kalpanayidunnoru) | P. Jayachandran | Pappanamkodu Lakshmanan | |
| 2 | "Jin Jinakkadi" (M) | K. J. Yesudas | Pappanamkodu Lakshmanan | |
| 3 | "Kaapaalikare" | Jolly Abraham | Pappanamkodu Lakshmanan | |
| 4 | "Kashmeera Chandrikayo" | K. J. Yesudas | Pappanamkodu Lakshmanan | |
| 5 | "Kudumayil Arimulla" (Jin Jinakkadi) [F] | L. R. Eeswari, Chorus | Pappanamkodu Lakshmanan | |
| 6 | "Sarppa Santhathimaare" | K. J. Yesudas, P. Jayachandran | Pappanamkodu Lakshmanan | |
