= Thuranna Jail =

1982 film by J. Sasikumar

- Directed by: J. Sasikumar
- Starring: Jayabharathi; Sathaar; Sukumaran; M. G. Soman
- Music by: Johnson
- Production company: St. Sebastian Movies
- Distributed by: St. Sebastian Movies
- Release date: 20 February 1982
- Country: India
- Language: Malayalam

Thuranna Jail is a 1982 Indian Malayalam film, directed by J. Sasikumar. The film stars Jayabharathi, Sathaar, Sukumaran and M. G. Soman in the lead roles. The film has musical score by Johnson. The film was a remake of the Hindi film Do Aankhen Barah Haath.

== Cast ==
- Jayabharathi as Thulasi
- Sathaar as James
- Sukumaran as Gopi
- M. G. Soman as Rajan
- Prathapachandran as Habeeb
- Kunchan as Thankappan
- KPAC Azeez as Chachappan
- Alummoodan as Dasappan
- KPAC Sunny as Kuttan Pilla
- Jagannatha Varma as Venukuttan
- C. I. Paul as Vaasu
- Reena as Mercy
- Meena as Kunjikutty

== Soundtrack ==
The music was composed by Johnson and the lyrics were written by Poovachal Khader and P. Bhaskaran.

No.	Song	Singers	Lyrics	Length (m:ss)
1	"Maama Maama Karayalle"	Latha Raju, Sherin Peters, Srikanth	Poovachal Khader	
2	"Shaaleena Bhaavathil"	P. Jayachandran, Vani Jairam	Poovachal Khader	
3	"Sharanamayyappaa Sharanamayyappaa"	K. J. Yesudas	P. Bhaskaran	
4	"Thathammappenninu Kalyaanam"	J. M. Raju	Poovachal Khader	
