= Avalku Maranamilla =

1978 film

- അവൾക്കു മരണമില്ല
- Directed by: Melattoor Ravi Varma
- Written by: M. R. Joseph
- Screenplay by: M. R. Joseph
- Starring: Prathapachandran; Baby Sumathi; Bahadoor; Janardanan
- Cinematography: U. Rajagopal
- Edited by: K. Narayanan
- Music by: G. Devarajan
- Production company: Jameela Enterprises
- Distributed by: Jameela Enterprises
- Release date: 19 October 1978
- Country: India
- Language: Malayalam

Avalku Maranamilla (മലയാളം:അവൾക്കു മരണമില്ല) is a 1978 Indian Malayalam film, directed by Melattoor Ravi Varma. The film stars Prathapachandran, Baby Sumathi, Bahadoor and Janardanan in the lead roles. The film has musical score by G. Devarajan.

== Cast ==
- Prathapachandran
- Baby Sumathi
- Bahadoor
- Janardanan
- Kuthiravattam Pappu
- M. G. Soman
- P. R. Varalakshmi
- Vidhubala

== Soundtrack ==
The music was composed by G. Devarajan and the lyrics were written by Mankombu Gopalakrishnan.

No.	Song	Singers	Lyrics	Length (m:ss)
1	"Aalilathoniyil"	K. J. Yesudas, P. Madhuri	Mankombu Gopalakrishnan	
2	"Navaneetha Chandrike"	K. J. Yesudas	Mankombu Gopalakrishnan	
3	"Navaneetha Chandrike" (F)	Vani Jairam	Mankombu Gopalakrishnan	
4	"Shankhanaadam Muzhakkunnu"	P. Madhuri	Mankombu Gopalakrishnan	
