= Snehathinte Mukhangal =

- Directed by: Hariharan
- Written by: S. L. Puram Sadanandan
- Screenplay by: S. L. Puram Sadanandan
- Produced by: K. C. Joy
- Starring: Prem Nazir; Madhu; Jayabharathi; Vincent; Seema; Janardanan
- Cinematography: T. N. Krishnankutty Nair
- Edited by: M. S. Mani
- Music by: M. S. Viswanathan
- Production company: Priyadarsini Movies
- Distributed by: Thirumeni Pictures
- Release date: 8 December 1978
- Country: India
- Language: Malayalam

Snehathinte Mukhangal is a 1978 Indian Malayalam film, directed by Hariharan and produced by K. C. Joy. The film stars Prem Nazir, Madhu, Jayabharathi and Janardanan in the lead roles. The film has a music score by M. S. Viswanathan.

== Cast ==
- Prem Nazir as Sreedharan
- Madhu as Devadas
- Jayabharathi as Lakshmi
- Paravoor Bharathan as Jyotsyar
- Kanakadurga as Savithri
- Seema as Radhika
- Vincent as Mohan
- Sankaradi as Ammavan
- Kottayam Shantha as Lakshmi's mother
- Adoor Bhasi as Sarasappan
- Sukumari as Sarasa
- Vanchiyoor Radha as Naaniyamma
- T. R. Omana as Doctor
- Mancheri Chandran
- Thodupuzha Radhakrishnan

== Soundtrack ==
The music was composed by M. S. Viswanathan and the lyrics were written by Mankombu Gopalakrishnan.

No.	Song	Singers	Lyrics	Length (m:ss)
1	"Arariro En Janmasaabhalyam"	P. Susheela	Mankombu Gopalakrishnan	
2	"Arayarayo Kingini Arayo"	P. Susheela, Chorus, Jolly Abraham	Mankombu Gopalakrishnan	
3	"Gangayil Theerthamaadiya"	P. Susheela	Mankombu Gopalakrishnan	
4	"Jik Jik Theevandi"	P. Jayachandran, Ambili	Mankombu Gopalakrishnan	
5	"Pookkaalam Ithu Pookkaalam"	K. J. Yesudas	Mankombu Gopalakrishnan	
