= Adimakkachavadam =

1978 film directed by Hariharan

- Directed by: Hariharan
- Written by: K. T. Muhammad
- Screenplay by: K. T. Muhammad
- Produced by: P. Sukumaran
- Starring: M. G. Soman; Jayan; Jayabharathi; K. P. A. C. Lalitha; Adoor Bhasi
- Cinematography: J. Williams
- Edited by: M. S. Mani
- Music by: G. Devarajan
- Production company: Sudarsanakala
- Distributed by: Thirumeni Pictures
- Release date: 27 September 1978
- Country: India
- Language: Malayalam

Adimakkachavadam is a 1978 Indian Malayalam film, directed by Hariharan and produced by P. Sukumaran. The film stars M. G. Soman, Jayan, Jayabharathi, K. P. A. C. Lalitha and Adoor Bhasi in the lead roles. The film has musical score by G. Devarajan.

== Plot ==
Sita, an honest and virtuous girl, is married to Vasu who promptly abandons her after cheating her of her gold jewellery. He uses the money to pay off Ponnamma's father and marries her. Sita has to face the recrimination of society alone as she gives birth to Vasu's child. Meanwhile, Ponnamma realizes that women are as exchangeable as cattle for the cattle trader Vasu. She is persuaded by her ex-lover to elope with him. Will Sita take back her repentant husband? Or has she grown disillusioned by this time?

The film explores the exploitation of women by men, whether they are virtuous and obedient like Sita. Or rebellious like Sita's sister Chandrika who elopes with a rich man's son- only to be abandoned by him.

== Cast ==
- M. G. Soman as Vasu
- Jayan as Ponnamma's lover
- Vincent as Jose
- Sathaar as Chaathan
- Jayabharathi as Sita
- Shubha as Ponnamma
- KPAC Lalitha as Parvathiyamma
- Adoor Bhasi as Velayudan
- Sankaradi as Varkey Muthalali
- K. P. A. C. Lalitha as Seetha
- Bahadoor as Madhavan
- Kuthiravattam Pappu as Kuttappan
- Latha as Chandrika
- Suchitra as Omana
- Kottayam Santha as Jessy James
- Oduvil Unnikrishnan as Guest at song
- Pala Thankam as Hostel warden
- Bhaskara Kurup as Rakshasan

== Soundtrack ==
The music was composed by G. Devarajan and the lyrics were written by Mankombu Gopalakrishnan.

| No. | Song | Singers | Lyrics | Length (m:ss) |
|---|---|---|---|---|
| 1 | "Aadishilpi" | K. J. Yesudas | Mankombu Gopalakrishnan | |
| 2 | "Baliye Bali" | C. O. Anto | Mankombu Gopalakrishnan | |
| 3 | "Edanil Aadiyil" | Karthikeyan | Mankombu Gopalakrishnan | |
| 4 | "Pallimanchal" | P. Madhuri | Mankombu Gopalakrishnan | |
