= Kadalkkaattu =

1980 Indian film

- Theatrical release poster
- Directed by: P. G. Viswambharan
- Written by: A. Sheriff
- Produced by: Sherif Kottarakkara
- Starring: Jayabharathi; K. P. A. C. Lalitha; M. G Soman; Bahadoor
- Cinematography: C. Ramachandra Menon
- Edited by: V. P. Krishnan
- Music by: A. T. Ummer
- Production company: Geetha Movies
- Distributed by: Geetha Movies
- Release date: 23 February 1980
- Country: India
- Language: Malayalam

Kadalkkaattu (transl. Sea breeze) is a 1980 Indian Malayalam-language drama film directed by P. G. Viswambharan, written by A. Sheriff, and produced by Sherif Kottarakkara. The film stars Jayabharathi, K. P. A. C. Lalitha, M. G. Soman, and Bahadoor. The film has musical score by A. T. Ummer.

== Cast ==
- Jayabharathi as Lisy
- K. P. A. C. Lalitha as Mariya
- Jose Prakash as Vasu chettambi
- Bahadoor aa Saidukka
- Janardanan as Gopalan
- Kottarakkara Sreedharan Nair as Fernandez
- M. G. Soman as Sreedharan
- Kollam GK Pillai as Sankaran
- Kuthiravattom Pappu as Raghavan
- Santhakumari as Stella

== Soundtrack ==
The music was composed by A. T. Ummer and the lyrics were written by Bichu Thirumala.

No.	Song	Singers	Lyrics	Length (m:ss)
1	"Neelanilaavoru Thoni"	K. J. Yesudas	Bichu Thirumala	
2	"Neeyum Ninte Kilikkonchalum"	K. J. Yesudas, Chorus	Bichu Thirumala	
3	"Oru Muthu Veendum Kozhinju"	K. J. Yesudas	Bichu Thirumala	
4	"Ozhuki Ozhuki Oduvilee"	K. J. Yesudas, S. Janaki	Bichu Thirumala	
