= Pathiravum Pakalvelichavum =

- Directed by: M. Azad
- Written by: M. T. Vasudevan Nair
- Screenplay by: M. T. Vasudevan Nair
- Produced by: Thayyil Kunjikandan
- Starring: Prem Nazir; Jayabharathi; Sankaradi; Sreelatha Namboothiri
- Cinematography: V. Namas
- Edited by: G. Venkittaraman
- Music by: K. Raghavan
- Production company: Chelavoor Pictures
- Distributed by: Chelavoor Pictures
- Release date: 28 March 1974
- Country: India
- Language: Malayalam

Pathiravum Pakalvelichavum is a 1974 Indian Malayalam-language film, directed by M. Azad and produced by Thayyil Kunjikandan. The film stars Prem Nazir, Jayabharathi, Sankaradi and Sreelatha Namboothiri. The film's musical score was composed by K. Raghavan.

== Cast ==
- Prem Nazir
- Jayabharathi
- Sankaradi
- Sreelatha Namboothiri
- Raghavan
- Bahadoor
- Balan K. Nair
- Nilambur Ayisha
- S. P. Pillai
- T. Damodaran
- Aruna

== Soundtrack ==
The music was composed by K. Raghavan with lyrics by Yusufali Kechery.

No.	Song	Singers	Lyrics	Length (m:ss)
1	"Chodyamilla"	K. J. Yesudas	Yusufali Kechery	
2	"Kanneeraattile"	K. P. Brahmanandan	Yusufali Kechery	
3	"Marimaanmizhiyude"	K. J. Yesudas	Yusufali Kechery	
4	"Nattu Nanaykkaathe"	S. Janaki	Yusufali Kechery	
