= Makam Piranna Manka =

- Directed by: N. R. Pillai
- Written by: Ponkunnam Varkey
- Screenplay by: Ponkunnam Varkey
- Produced by: Ponkunnam Varkey
- Starring: Jayan; Jayabharathi; KPAC Lalitha; Adoor Bhasi
- Cinematography: C. Namasivayam
- Music by: V. Dakshinamoorthy
- Production company: Kavyadhara
- Distributed by: Kavyadhara
- Release date: 18 March 1977
- Country: India
- Language: Malayalam

Makam Piranna Manka is a 1977 Indian Malayalam film, directed by N. R. Pillai and produced by Ponkunnam Varkey. The film stars Jayan, Jayabharathi, KPAC Lalitha and Adoor Bhasi in the lead roles. The film has musical score by V. Dakshinamoorthy.

== Cast ==
- Jayan
- Jayabharathi
- KPAC Lalitha
- Adoor Bhasi
- Prameela
- Sankaradi
- Bhageeradhi Amma
- Elizabeth
- Janardanan
- M. G. Soman
- Moossathu
- Usharani
- Veeran

== Soundtrack ==
The music was composed by V. Dakshinamoorthy and the lyrics were written by Ettumanoor Somadasan and Aravind Abhayadev.

No.	Song	Singers	Lyrics	Length (m:ss)
1	"Aashrama Mangalyadeepame"	K. J. Yesudas, P. Susheela	Ettumanoor Somadasan	
2	"Ini Njaanurangatte"	P. Susheela	Ettumanoor Somadasan	
3	"Kaakkikkuppaayakkaara"	Vani Jairam	Ettumanoor Somadasan	
4	"Mallee Saayaka Lahari"	K. J. Yesudas	Ettumanoor Somadasan	
5	"Nithyakanyake Karthike"	K. J. Yesudas, Kalyani Menon	Ettumanoor Somadasan	
6	"Thottaal Pottunna Penne"	K. J. Yesudas	Aravind Abhayadev	
