= Uyirthezhunnelppu =

- Directed by: N. P. Suresh
- Written by: Purushan Alappuzha; Alappuzha Karthikeyan (dialogues)
- Screenplay by: Purushan Alappuzha
- Produced by: Purushan Alappuzha
- Starring: Prem Nazir; Hari; Anuradha; Bobby Kottarakkara
- Cinematography: P. N. Sundaram
- Edited by: N. P. Suresh
- Music by: A. T. Ummer
- Production company: Sreedevi Productions
- Distributed by: Sreedevi Productions
- Release date: 21 November 1985
- Country: India
- Language: Malayalam

Uyirthezhunnelppu is a 1985 Indian Malayalam film, directed by N. P. Suresh and produced by Purushan Alappuzha. The film stars Prem Nazir, Hari, Anuradha and Bobby Kottarakkara in the lead roles. The film has musical score by A. T. Ummer.

== Cast ==
- Prem Nazir
- Hari
- Anuradha
- Bobby Kottarakkara
- C. I. Paul
- Disco Shanthi
- Janardanan
- Ranipadmini
- Sangeetha
- T. G. Ravi
- Shanawas

== Soundtrack ==
The music was composed by A. T. Ummer and the lyrics were written by Poovachal Khader.

No.	Song	Singers	Lyrics	Length (m:ss)
1	"Nin Swantham Njaan"	Vani Jairam	Poovachal Khader	
2	"Raavin Raani"	Vani Jairam	Poovachal Khader	
