= Nizhal Yudham =

- Directed by: Baby
- Written by: Pappanamkodu Lakshmanan
- Screenplay by: Pappanamkodu Lakshmanan
- Produced by: Thiruppathi Chettiyar
- Starring: Sukumaran; Ravikumar; Sumalatha; Jagathy Sreekumar
- Music by: K. J. Joy
- Production company: Evershine Productions
- Distributed by: Evershine Productions
- Release date: 11 December 1981
- Country: India
- Language: Malayalam

Nizhal Yudham is a 1981 Indian Malayalam-language film, directed by Baby and produced by Thiruppathi Chettiyar. The film stars Sukumaran, Ravikumar, Sumalatha and Jagathy Sreekumar. The film musical score was composed by K. J. Joy.

== Cast ==
- Sukumaran as Ramesh
- Ravikumar as Gopi
- Sumalatha as Radha
- Jagathy Sreekumar as Preman
- Jose Prakash as Unnithan
- C. I. Paul as Sekhar
- Manavalan Joseph as Keshava Pilla
- PK Abraham as Gopalan
- Kalaranjini as Sobha
- Janardhanan as D'Zuza
- Prathapachandran as Adv Menon
- Kaviyoor Ponnamma as Devaki
- Pala Thankam as Keshava pilla's wife
- Silk Smitha as Dancer
- Alleppey Ashraf
- Sathyachithra as Santha

== Soundtrack ==
The music was composed by K. J. Joy with lyrics written by Devadas and Pappanamkodu Lakshmanan.

No.	Song	Singers	Lyrics	Length (m:ss)
1	"Laasyam Swapnalaasyam	Vani Jairam	Devadas	
2	"Madhu Mozhiyo"	Vani Jairam, S. P. Balasubrahmanyam	Pappanamkodu Lakshmanan	
3	"Neeyente Azhakaayi"	K. J. Yesudas, P. Susheela	Devadas	
4	"Sapthaswararaagadhaarayil"	P. Susheela	Devadas	
