= Yamini (film) =

- Directed by: M. Krishnan Nair
- Written by: Kanam E. J.
- Screenplay by: Kanam E. J.
- Produced by: Joy; M. S. Joseph
- Starring: Madhu; Jayabharathi; Muthukulam Raghavan Pillai; Adoor Bhavani
- Cinematography: R. C. Purushothaman
- Edited by: N. Gopalakrishnan
- Music by: M. K. Arjunan
- Production company: Priyadarsini Movies
- Distributed by: Priyadarsini Movies
- Release date: 9 November 1973
- Country: India
- Language: Malayalam

Yamini is a 1973 Indian Malayalam film, directed by M. Krishnan Nair and produced by Joy and M. S. Joseph. The film stars Madhu, Jayabharathi, Muthukulam Raghavan Pillai and Adoor Bhavani in the lead roles. The film had musical score by M. K. Arjunan.

== Cast ==
- Madhu as Gopalakrishnan
- Jayabharathi as Indira
- P. K. Abraham
- Muthukulam Raghavan Pillai
- Adoor Bhavani
- Adoor Pankajam as Dakshayani
- Alummoodan as Nanukkuttan
- Bahadoor
- Kavitha
- Kottarakkara Sreedharan Nair
- P. K. Venukkuttan Nair
- Sadhana

== Soundtrack ==
The music was composed by M. K. Arjunan and the lyrics were written by Kanam E. J.

No.	Song	Singers	Lyrics	Length (m:ss)
1	"Manushyanu Daivam"	K. J. Yesudas	Kanam E. J.	
2	"Punchiripoovumaay"	P. Susheela	Kanam E. J.	
3	"Rathnaraagamunarnna"	K. J. Yesudas	Kanam E. J.	
4	"Shalabhame Varoo"	P. Madhuri	Kanam E. J.	
5	"Swayamvara Kanyake"	K. J. Yesudas	Kanam E. J.	
