= Vazhivilakku =

- Directed by: Vijay
- Written by: Sreekumaran Thampi
- Starring: Prem Nazir; Sukumari; Jayabharathi; M. G. Soman
- Music by: V. Dakshinamoorthy
- Production company: Sreekanth Productions
- Distributed by: Sreekanth Productions
- Release date: 6 August 1976
- Country: India
- Language: Malayalam

Vazhivilakku is a 1976 Indian Malayalam-language film, directed by Vijay. The film stars Prem Nazir, Sukumari, Jayabharathi and M. G. Soman. The film has musical score by V. Dakshinamoorthy.

== Cast ==
- Prem Nazir
- Sukumari
- Jayabharathi
- M. G. Soman
- Mallika Sukumaran
- Nanditha Bose
- Sumithra
- Thikkurissy Sukumaran Nair

== Soundtrack ==
The music was composed by V. Dakshinamoorthy and the lyrics were written by P. Bhaskaran.

No.	Song	Singers	Lyrics	Length (m:ss)
1	"Hello Madam Nair"	K. J. Yesudas, Pattom Sadan	P. Bhaskaran	
2	"Samayam Chaithrasaayanthanam"	Jayashree	P. Bhaskaran	
3	"Seemantharekhayil Ninte"	K. J. Yesudas	P. Bhaskaran	
4	"Surabheemasa Vilaasam"	K. J. Yesudas, Jayashree	P. Bhaskaran	
5	"Unaranuu Njanunarnnu"	Vani Jairam	P. Bhaskaran	
6	"Yuvabhaaratha"	Shakeela Balakrishnan	P. Bhaskaran	
