= Muttathe Mulla =

- Directed by: J. Sasikumar
- Written by: Pappanamkodu Lakshmanan
- Produced by: Thiruppathi Chettiyar
- Starring: Prem Nazir; Adoor Bhasi; Thikkurissy Sukumaran Nair; Jose Prakash
- Cinematography: C. Ramachandra Menon
- Edited by: K. Sankunni
- Music by: V. Dakshinamoorthy
- Production company: Evershine Productions
- Distributed by: Evershine Productions
- Release date: 27 October 1977
- Country: India
- Language: Malayalam

Muttathe Mulla is a 1977 Indian Malayalam-language film, directed by J. Sasikumar and produced by Thiruppathi Chettiyar. The film stars Prem Nazir, Adoor Bhasi, Thikkurissy Sukumaran Nair and Jose Prakash. The film has musical score by V. Dakshinamoorthy.

== Cast ==
- Prem Nazir as Gopi
- Adoor Bhasi as Kochappan
- Thikkurissy Sukumaran Nair
- Jose Prakash as Thambi
- K. P. Ummer as Panikkar
- M. G. Soman as Baabu
- Usharani as Radha
- Vidhubala as Geetha
- Meena as Kalyani (tailor)
- Kaviyoor Ponnamma as Maheswari
- T. R. Omana as Lakshmi
- Sreelatha Namboothiri as Anantham (tailor)
- Kunjan as Supran (Tailoring Assistant)
- Sudheer
- Janardhanan as Ramesh

== Soundtrack ==
The music was composed by V. Dakshinamoorthy and the lyrics were written by Pappanamkodu Lakshmanan.

No.	Song	Singers	Lyrics	Length (m:ss)
1	"Aaromalunnikku"	P. Jayachandran, Ambili, Chorus, Jayashree	Pappanamkodu Lakshmanan	
2	"Happy New Year"	Ambili	Pappanamkodu Lakshmanan	
3	"Manam Poleyano"	K. J. Yesudas	Pappanamkodu Lakshmanan	
4	"Swapangalaadyamaay"	K. J. Yesudas	Pappanamkodu Lakshmanan	
