= Light House (1976 film) =

1976 Indian Malayalam film

- Directed by: AB Raj
- Written by: A. B. Raj; M. R. Joseph (dialogues)
- Produced by: A. B. Raj
- Starring: Prem Nazir; Jayan; Jayabharathi; KPAC Lalitha
- Cinematography: T. N. Krishnankutty Nair
- Edited by: B. S. Mani
- Music by: M. K. Arjunan
- Production company: Ranjini Films
- Distributed by: Ranjini Films
- Release date: 17 September 1976
- Country: India
- Language: Malayalam

Light House is a 1976 Indian Malayalam film, directed and produced by A. B. Raj. The film stars Prem Nazir, Jayan, Jayabharathi and KPAC Lalitha in the lead roles. The film's musical score is by M. K. Arjunan.

== Cast ==
- Prem Nazir as Ravi/Omanakuttan
- Jayabharathi as Geetha
- Adoor Bhasi as Chandu
- Bahadoor as Damu
- KPAC Lalitha as Thankamma
- Jose Prakash as Jayaprakash
- Sankaradi as Raghavan Pilla
- P. R. Varalakshmi as Usha
- Sreelatha Namboothiri as Bindu
- Meena as Meenakshi
- P. K. Abraham as Rajasekharan, Vikraman (double role)
- Raghavan as Raghu
- G. K. Pillai as President
- T. P. Madhavan as Bhaskaran Nair
- Mancheri Chandran as Secretary
- Paul Vengola as Watcher
- Mallika Sukumaran as Mallika
- Vanchiyoor Radha as Madhaviyamma
- Maniyanpilla Raju as Thankamma's brother
- Santo Krishnan as Velu
- Seetharam

== Soundtrack ==
The music was composed by M. K. Arjunan and the lyrics were written by Sreekumaran Thampi.

No.	Song	Singers	Lyrics	Length (m:ss)
1	"Aadathin Achumbitha"	K. J. Yesudas	Sreekumaran Thampi	
2	"Malsarikkaan Aarundu"	P. Jayachandran, Ambili, C. O. Anto	Sreekumaran Thampi	
3	"Nishaasundari Nilkoo"	P. Jayachandran	Sreekumaran Thampi	
4	"Odikko Omanakuttan"	C. O. Anto, Manoharan	Sreekumaran Thampi	
5	"Sooryakaanthippoo Chirichu"	K. J. Yesudas	Sreekumaran Thampi	
