= Mattoru Karnan =

- Directed by: J. Sasikumar
- Written by: Pappanamkodu Lakshmanan
- Screenplay by: Pappanamkodu Lakshmanan
- Starring: Sudheer; M G Soman; Ravikumar; Jayan; Jayabharathi; Jagathy Sreekumar; Adoor Bhasi
- Cinematography: C. Ramachandra Menon
- Edited by: K. Sankunni
- Music by: K. J. Joy
- Production company: Gayathri Combines
- Distributed by: Gayathri Combines
- Release date: 13 October 1978
- Country: India
- Language: Malayalam

Mattoru Karnan is a 1978 Indian Malayalam film, directed by J. Sasikumar. The film stars Jayan, Jayabharathi, Sudheer, M G Soman, Jagathy Sreekumar and Adoor Bhasi in the lead roles. The film has musical score by K. J. Joy.

== Cast ==
- Sudheer
- M. G. Soman
- Jayan
- Ravikumar
- Jayabharathi
- Jagathy Sreekumar
- Kunchan
- Maniyanpilla Raju
- Adoor Bhasi
- Praveena

== Soundtrack ==
The music was composed by K. J. Joy and the lyrics were written by Chavara Gopi.

No.	Song	Singers	Length (m:ss)
1	"Choothukalathil"	P. Jayachandran, Ambili	
2	"Kaattinte Karavalayathil"	P. Jayachandran, Vani Jairam	
3	"Madanolsava Melayitha"	K. J. Yesudas	
4	"Omanakkutta"	P. Susheela	
5	"Thalakkanam Koodum"	Vani Jairam, Chorus	
