= Madhuvidhu Theerum Mumbe =

- Directed by: K. Ramachandran
- Written by: Pushparajan; J. C. George (dialogues)
- Screenplay by: Pushparajan
- Produced by: Pushparajan
- Starring: Prem Nazir; Devan; Jalaja; Hari
- Cinematography: Hemachandran
- Edited by: G. Murali
- Music by: K. J. Joy
- Production company: Rajapushpa
- Distributed by: Rajapushpa
- Release date: 17 May 1985
- Country: India
- Language: Malayalam

Madhuvidhu Theerum Mumbe is a 1985 Indian Malayalam film, directed by K. Ramachandran and produced by Pushparajan. The film stars Prem Nazir, Devan, Jalaja and Hari in the lead roles. The film featured a musical score composed by K. J. Joy.

== Cast ==
- Prem Nazir as Father Kizhakkethil
- Devan as Sunny
- Jalaja as Shobha
- Hari as Swami/Jose
- Prathapachandran as Priest
- Aroor Sathyan as Kuppuswami
- C. I. Paul as Advocate
- Kuthiravattam Pappu as Thoma
- Manorama as Palakkattu Maami
- Meena as Shoshamma
- P. K. Abraham as Mathew Varghese
- Santhakumari as Mariya
- T. G. Ravi as Chackochan

== Soundtrack ==
The music was composed by K. J. Joy and the lyrics were written by Poovachal Khader.

No.	Song	Singer	Length (m:ss)
1	"Oru Divyasangamam"	K. J. Yesudas	
