= Jimmy (1979 film) =

- Directed by: Melattoor Ravi Varma
- Written by: V. Devan; Mani Muhammed (dialogues)
- Screenplay by: Mani Muhammed
- Produced by: T. E. Vasudevan
- Starring: Sankaradi; Raghavan; Sathaar; Janardanan
- Cinematography: Jayanan Vincent
- Edited by: B. S. Mani
- Music by: V. Dakshinamoorthy
- Production company: Jaijaya Combines
- Distributed by: Jaijaya Combines
- Release date: 21 September 1979
- Country: India
- Language: Malayalam

Jimmy is a 1979 Indian Malayalam film, directed by Melattoor Ravi Varma and produced by T. E. Vasudevan. The film stars K. P. Ummer, Sankaradi, Raghavan, Sathaar and Janardanan in the lead roles. V. Dakshinamoorthy composed the musical score.

== Cast ==
- Prem Nazir (cameo role)
- K. P. Ummer
- Sankaradi
- Raghavan
- Sathaar
- Janardanan
- Ravikumar
- Vidhubala
- Seema

== Soundtrack ==
The music was composed by V. Dakshinamoorthy and the lyrics were written by Sreekumaran Thampi.

No.	Song	Singers	Lyrics	Length (m:ss)
1	"Chirikkumpol Nee"	K. J. Yesudas	Sreekumaran Thampi	
2	"Njaayaraazhchakal"	K. J. Yesudas, Ambili	Sreekumaran Thampi	
3	"Sathyathin Kaavalkkaaran"	Kalyani Menon	Sreekumaran Thampi	
