= Janardhanan (actor) =

Indian film actor and producer

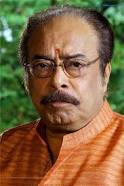
- Born: Janardhanan Pillai; 5 May 1946 (age 80); Vaikom, Kingdom of Travancore, British India (present day Kottayam, Kerala, India)
- Education: Bachelor of Commerce
- Alma mater: Velu Thampi Memorial N.S.S. College, Dhanuvachapuram
- Occupations: Actor; Film producer
- Years active: 1965–present
- Spouse: Vijayalaxmi Janardhanan
- Children: 2
- Parents: Kollarakkattu Veettil K. Gopala Pillai; Gouri Amma
- Military career
- Allegiance: India
- Branch: Indian Air Force

Janardhanan Pillai (born 5 May 1946), simply known as Janardhanan, also known as Janardhanan Nair, is an Indian actor, producer and a former Indian Air Force employee who predominantly acts in Malayalam films. He acted in his first feature film Adyathe Kadha, directed by K. S. Sethumadhavan in 1971, he acted in more than 700 films. He started his career when Malayalam films were made in black and white. He is known for his style of handling humour and his iconic voice. He started his career playing brusque villains and sub hero roles in the 1970s and early 1980s, acting along with Prem Nazir and Jayan, but later established himself as a highly sought-after comedian.

The turning point of his career was his role in the 1988 film Oru CBI Diary Kurippu, which brought out his comic skills. However, he was typecast as a comedian only after the 1993 film Meleparambil Aanveedu. Mimicry artists often imitate his iconic role as Garvasis Aashan from Mannar Mathai Speaking (1995). Along with comic roles, he has done serious roles like D.I.G Marar in Dhruvam and Jayashankar in Mafia. Apart from stereotyped Hindu/Muslim/Christian characters, he has the distinction of portraying a Sikh and a Jewish character.

== Personal life ==
Janardhanan Pillai was born in the village of Ullala near Vaikom on May 5, 1946, to Kollarakkattu Veettil Paravoor K. Gopala Pillai and Gouri Amma, as their youngest son. He has four brothers and three sisters. He had his primary education from NSS High School, Vechoor and pre-university from NSS Hindu College, Changanassery. Later, he joined the Indian Air force for a short period. After two years in 1967, he joined Velu Thampi Memorial N.S.S. College, Dhanuvachapuram for B.Com.

He debuted in a Family Planning documentary Prathisanthi, directed by Adoor Gopalakrishnan, recommended by lecturer Sreevaraham Balakrishnan. He turned down the offer of bank employment and became Production Manager for Chemparathi, produced by S. K. Nair and directed by P. N. Menon. After that, he worked with Kakkanadan and V. B. C. Nair for Malayalanadu weekly. Then S. K. Nair sent him to Madras (now called Chennai) to take charge in his Madras office. While working there, he got an opportunity to act in Aadhyathe Katha in 1972.

He is married to Vijayalaksmi and they have two daughters: Rema Ranjini and Laxmi.

He also had an affair with another woman. In his own words "Around 18 years ago, I had an affair with another woman. I did my best for her. My wife was aware of the affair,".

== Filmography ==
=== As actor ===
==== 1970s ====
Year	Title	Role	Notes
1972	Aadhyathe Katha	Mohan	
1972	Chemparathy	Vinayan	
1973	Gayathri		
1973	Mazhakaaru	Soman	
1973	Chukku		
1974	Udayam Kizhakku Thanne		
1974	Bhoogolam Thiriyunnu	Gopi	
1974	Moham		
1975	Swami Ayyappan		
1975	Utsavam	Ouseppu	
1975	Pennpada	Panicker	
1975	Chalanum		
1975	Priyamulla Sophia		
1975	Njan Ninne Premikkunnu		
1975	Sathyathinte Nizhalil		
1975	Omanakkunju		
1975	Odakkuzhal		
1975	Love Letter		
1975	Cheenavala	Rowdy Pachan	
1976	Abhinandanam	Police Inspector	
1976	Mallanum Mathevanum		
1976	Ponni	Sub-collector	
1976	Prasaadam	Sukumaran	
1976	Ozhikkinethire		
1976	Chennai Valarthiya Kutty		
1976	Anaavaranam		
1976	Missi		
1976	Ayalkkaari	Mathew	
1977	Anjali		
1977	Kannappanunni	Pachan	
1977	Muttathe Mulla	Ramesh	
1977	Agninakshathram		
1977	Harshabashpam		
1977	Makam Piranna Manka		
1977	Saritha		
1977	Ivanente Priyaputhran		
1977	Veedu Oru Swargam		
1977	Innale Innu	Chadran	
1977	Aanandham Paramaanandham	Inspector Raghavan	
1977	Acharam Ammini Osaram Omana	Ravikumar	
1978	Snehikkan Samayamilla		
1978	Aarum Anyaralla	Baby	
1978	Avalku Maranamilla		
1978	Velluvili	Sreedharan	
1978	Yagaswam	Vijayan	
1978	Vadakakku Oru Hridayam		
1978	Snehathinte Mukhangal		
1978	Iniyum Puzhayozhukum	Sukumaran	
1978	Randu Penkuttikal		
1978	Avalude Ravukal		
1978	Kadathanaattu Maakkam	Kunjikannan	
1978	Mukkuvane Snehicha Bhootham	Lopez	
1978	Bandham		
1978	Kanyaka	Raghavan	
1978	Vyaamoham		
1978	Aaravam	Anthony	
1978	Vayanadan Thamban		
1978	Kudumbam Namukku Sreekovil	Venugopal	
1978	Eeta	Kurup	
1979	Vijayam Nammude Senani		
1979	Ezhu Nirangal	Radhakrishnan	
1979	Hridayathil Nee Matram		
1979	Iniyathra		
1979	Indradhanussu	Sub Inspector Babu	
1979	Prabhaathasandhya	Kutty Sankaran	
1979	Vijayanum Veeranum	Prakash	
1979	Lillypookkal		
1979	Jimmy	Babu Paul	
1979	Simhasanam		
1979	Itha Oru Theeram	Chandran	
1979	Vaaleduthaven Vaalaal		
1979	Vellayani Paramu	Kottaram Sarvadhikari Swami	
1979	Yakshi Paaru	Shekharan	
1979	Sandhyaragam		
1979	Jeevitham Oru Gaanam	Varghese	
1979	Ore Vaanam Ore Bhoomi	Raghu	Tamil film
1979	Ezhamkadalinakkare	Raghu	

==== 1980s ====
Year	Title	Role	Notes
1980	Ashwaradham	Rajagopal	
1980	Sathyam	Balraj	
1980	Theenalangal	Madhavan/Rajasekharan	
1980	Aagamanam	Murali	
1980	Saraswathi Yaamam	Madhu	
1980	Dwik Vijayam	Pankajakshan	
1980	Idi Muzhakkam		
1980	Paalattu Kunjikannan	Thampikutti	
1980	Chandrahasam	Balan	
1980	Raagam Thaanam Pallavi		
1980	Avan Oru Ahankaari		
1980	Kadalkkaattu	Gopalan	
1980	Manushya Mrugam	Chandran	
1981	Ellaam Ninakku Vendi	Somarajan	
1981	Aambal Poovu		
1981	Tharattu		
1981	Ithihasam		
1981	Itha Oru Dhikkari	Koyikkal Kuruppu	
1981	Nizhal Yudham		
1981	Ariyappedatha Rahasyam	Pappan	
1982	Snehapoorvam Meera	Baby	
1982	Marupacha	Janardhanan	
1982	Njan Ekananu	Raghu	
1982	Keni	Madhusoodanan	
1982	Post Mortem	Unni	
1982	Ethiraalikal	Hamsa	
1982	Sharam		
1982	Aayudham		
1982	Mylanji	Moideen	
1982	Aarambham	Lazar	
1982	Ithiri Neram Othiri Karyam	Shekharan	
1983	Samrambham		
1983	Pourasham	Lawrence	
1983	Angam		
1983	Nanayam	Vasu	
1983	Ee Yugam		
1983	Bandham		
1983	Arabikkadal		
1983	Iniyengilum	Kariyachan	
1984	Unaroo		
1984	Oru Kochu Swapnam	Co-operative bank manager	
1984	Uyarangalil	A. K. Menon	
1984	Lakshmana Rekha	Balachandra Menon	
1984	Kudumbam Oru Swargam Bharya Oru Devatha	Paul	
1984	Kadamattathachan	Aliyar	
1984	Aksharangal	Theatre Artist Babujose	
1984	Ivide Thudangunnu	S. P.	
1984	Adiyozhukkukal	Hamsa	
1984	Aalkkoottathil Thaniye	Balachandran	
1985	Uyirthezhunnelppu	Anand	
1985	Pournami Raavil 3D		
1985	Idanilangal		
1985	Mukhyamanthri	Pappachan	
1985	Mulamoottil Adima	Ibrahim	
1985	Janakeeya Kodathi	Janardanan	
1985	Anubandham	Police Officer	
1985	Kathodu Kathoram	Lazar	
1985	Kattukulle Thiruvizha		Tamil film
1986	Sukhamo Devi	Ouseppachan	
1986	Koodanayum Kattu		
1986	Abhayam Thedi	C. S. Nair	
1986	Gandhinagar 2nd Street	Professor	
1986	Niramulla Ravulkal	Kumaran	
1986	Yuvajanotsavam	Unnithan	
1986	Cabaret Dancer		
1986	Pournami Rathriyil		
1986	Nimishangal	S.P. Damodharan Pillai	
1986	Aavanazhi	Vincent	
1986	Ee Kaikalil	Madhava Menon	
1987	Amme Bhagavathi	Swami Siddhan	
1987	Vrutham	Avarachan	
1987	Nadodikkattu	Kovai Venkatesan	
1987	Irupatham Noottandu	IG Thomas IPS	
1987	Unnikale Oru Kadha Parayam	Police Inspector	
1987	Kaala Rathri		
1987	Mangalya Charthu	Kuruppu	
1987	Thoranam		
1987	Itha Samayamayi	MLA Vattappara	
1987	Sreedharante Onnam Thirumurivu	Ramachandran	
1987	Adimakal Udamakal	Ramachandran	
1987	Aankiliyude Tharattu	Stanley	
1988	Moonnam Mura	IG Mathews	
1988	Oru CBI Diary Kurippu	K. A. Ouseppachan	
1988	Abkari	Karthikeyan	
1988	August 1	K. Divakara Kaimal	
1988	Karate Girls		
1988	Evidence	D I G	
1988	1921	Appunni Nair	
1988	Thanthram	Adv. Rajasekharan	
1988	Mukthi	Shekharan Nair	
1989	Aksharathettu	Regional Manager	
1989	Varavelpu	Kumaran	
1989	Vandanam	MP Ramachandran	
1989	Pradeshika Varthakal		
1989	The News	Radhakrishnan	
1989	Naduvazhikal	Aasan	
1989	Prabhatham Chuvanna Theruvil		
1989	Adhipan	Kaimal	
1989	Charithram	Cherian	
1989	Adikkurippu	William	
1989	Jagratha	Ouseppachan	

==== 1990s ====
Year	Title	Role	Notes
1990	Crime Branch	Charukeshan	
1990	Randam Varavu	Police Officer	
1990	Nagarangalil Chennu Raparkam	Rambo Chackochan	
1990	Kuruppinte Kanakku Pustakom	Beena's Uncle	
1990	Kadathanadan Ambadi		
1990	May Dinam	Chachappan	
1990	Lal Salam	Kannan Muthalali	
1990	Nammude Naadu	CI Joseph	
1990	Arhatha	Krishnakumar	
1990	Appu	Janardhana Kaimal	
1990	No.20 Madras Mail	Adv. Thomas Mathew	
1991	Nattuvishesham	Kattumooppan	
1991	Kilukkampetti	Managing Director	
1991	Godfather	Gopi	
1991	Georgekutty C/O Georgekutty		
1991	Advaitham	Krishnan Kutty Menon	
1991	Nayam Vyakthamakkunnu	Chackochan	
1991	Adayalam	Adv. Haridas	
1992	Mayaunna Manasukal		
1992	Soorya Gayathri	Babu Karunakaran	
1992	Poochakkaru Mani Kettum	Menon	
1992	Adhwaytham	Krishnankutty Menon	
1992	Sathyaprathinja		
1992	Kizhakkan Pathrose	Ponjikkara Appa	
1992	Apaaratha	Phalgunan	
1992	Sadayam	Police Officer	
1992	Oottyppattanam	Menon	
1992	My Dear Muthachan	Adv. Ananthan	
1992	Ennodishtam Koodamo	Arathi's Uncle	
1992	Adharam	Krishna Menon	
1992	Thalastaanam	C.M Krishnankutty	
1993	Sarovaram		
1993	Porutham		
1993	Aacharyan	Raveendranath	
1993	Varam		
1993	Sthalathe Pradhana Payyans	CM Govinda Menon	
1993	Mithunam	Sivasankaran	
1993	Meleparambil Anveedu	Kannappan	
1993	Maya Mayooram	Mohan Tharakan	
1993	Janam	K. Divakaran	
1993	Ekalavyan	Krishnan	
1993	Devaasuram	Kunjikrishnan Nambiar	
1993	Dhruvam	D.I.G. Marar	
1993	Vatsalyam	Ramankutty Menon	
1993	Mafia	DYSP Jayashankar	
1993	Paalayam	Lawrence	
1994	Kabooliwala	'Minnal' Thomachan	
1994	Vardhakya Puranam	Cherian Thomas	
1994	Vadhu Doctoranu	Sankaran	
1994	Poochakkaru Mani Kettum	Menon	
1994	Pingami	Koshy Varghese	
1994	Pidakkozhi Koovunna Noottandu	Dr. Vishnu Narayanan Potty	
1994	Varanamaalyam	Thomas	
1994	Rajadhani		
1994	Kinnaripuzhayoram	Sivashankaran Nair	
1994	CID Unnikrishnan B.A., B.Ed.	Rishikeshan Nair	
1994	Bheesmacharya	Madhavan Nair	
1994	Vishnu	Divakaran	
1995	Highway	DYSP George Alexander	
1995	No. 1 Snehatheeram Bangalore North	Kunjukkuttychayan	
1995	Sundari Neeyum Sundaran Njanum		
1995	Achan Rajavu Appan Jethavu	Madhavan Thampi	
1995	Parvathy Parinayam	Narayanankutty	
1995	Minnaminuginum Minnukettu	Unnithan	
1995	Tom & Jerry	Chachan	
1995	Three Men Army	K. R. G. Menon	
1995	Thacholi Varghese Chekavar	Mathukutty	
1995	Sindoora Rekha	Narayanan Nair	
1995	Puthukkottayile Puthumanavalan	Palathara Palunni	
1995	Pai Brothers	Kesavan	
1995	Mannar Mathai Speaking	Garvasees Ashan	
1995	Mangalam Veettil Manaseswari Gupta	Achuthankutty	
1995	Kidilol Kidilam	Karunakara Kuruppu	
1995	Kalamasseriyil Kalyanayogam	Kalamassery Krishnan Nair	
1995	Kaattile Thadi Thevarude Ana	Alexander	
1995	Avittam Thirunaal Aarogya Sriman	Phalgunan	
1995	Aniyan Bava Chetan Bava	Kottaram Veedan	
1995	Aadyathe Kanmani	Unnithan	
1996	Mimics Super 1000	Easwara Kurup	
1996	Swapna Lokathe Balabhaskaran	Sadashivan	
1996	Parasala Pachan Payannur Paramu		
1996	Mookkilla Rajyathu Murimookkan Rajavu		
1996	Manthrika Kuthira	Kunjukutty	
1996	Devaraagam	Harihara Subramanya Iyyer	
1996	Kanjirapally Kariachan		
1997	The Good Boys	Mohanachandran	
1997	Superman	Nithya's Valyachan	
1997	Kilikurussiyile Kudumbamela		
1997	Poonilamazha	Abhimana Varma	
1997	Kottappurathe Koottukudumbam	Bharathan Pillai	
1997	Oru Mutham Manimutham	Sreedharan	
1997	Poomarathanalil	Fernandez	
1997	Vamsam		
1997	Anjarakalyanam		
1997	Junior Mandrake		
1997	The Car	Kumarettan	
1997	Kilukil Pambaram		
1997	Karunyam	K. K. Nair	
1997	Kadhanayakan	Sathrughnan Pillai	
1997	Hitler Brothers	Thrivikraman	
1997	Aniyathi Pravu	Dr. Kuttappayi	
1997	Varnapakittu	Ramaswamy Iyer	
1998	Summer in Bethlehem	Colonel C.R. Menon	
1998	Punjabi House	Manninder Singh	
1998	Meenathil Thalikettu	Kunjiraman	
1998	Mayilpeelikkavu	Narayanan Kutty	
1998	Gloria Fernandez From USA		
1998	Ormacheppu		
1999	Vazhunnor	Thevakattu Avarachan	
1999	Vasanthiyum Lakshmiyum Pinne Njaanum	Krishnan Nair	
1999	Ustaad	Swamy	
1999	Pathram	Kuruvithadam Baby	
1999	Njangal Santhushtaranu	Idikkula Ittoopp	
1999	Parashala Pachan Payannur Paramu		
1999	American Ammayi	Menon	
1999	James Bond	Kunnamkulam Rappai	
1999	Friends	Madhava Varma	
1999	F.I.R	Chief Minister	
1999	Crime File	Kaliyar Pathrose Vaidyan	
1999	Chandamama	Thampy	

==== 2000s ====
Year	Title	Role	Notes
2000	Sathyam Shivam Sundaram	Sambhavana Warrier	
2000	Pilots	Shekharan	
2000	Mr. Butler	Ramakrishnan	
2000	Swayamvara Panthal	Radhakrishnan	
2000	Dreams	Thottathil Mathen	
2000	Mark Antony	Parel Pappu	
2000	Devadoothan	Principal	
2000	Darling Darling	Unnithan	
2000	Daivathinte Makan	Fr. Gabriel	
2001	Saivar Thirumeni	Fr. Kuruvithadam	
2001	Randam Bhavam	D. I. G. of Police	
2001	Naranathu Thampuran	Police officer Baburaj	
2001	Ee Ravil		
2001	Rakshasa Rajavu	Chief Minister	
2001	Nagaravadhu	Kesari Govinda Pillai	
2001	Dubai	K. J. Nair	
2001	Karumadikkuttan	Govindan Nair	
2001	Andolanam		
2001	Narendran Makan Jayakanthan Vaka	Balakrishnan Nambiar	
2001	Nariman	Chief Minister Shekharan	
2001	One Man Show	Raveendran	
2002	Kattuchembakam	A.D.G.P Narendra Thampi	
2002	Thandavam	Menon	
2002	Snehithan	Vivek's father	
2002	Kuberan	Vasan	
2002	Kayamkulam Kanaran		
2002	Kaiyethum Doorath	Passenger in the boat	
2002	Chirikkudukka	Prahaladhan Pillai	
2002	Bamboo Boys	Mula Swamy	
2003	Gramophone	Gregory	
2003	Chronic Bachelor	Parameswaran Pillai	
2003	Sadanandante Samayam	Menon	
2003	Swapnam Kondu Thulabharam	Madhavan Thampi	
2003	Melvilasam Sariyanu	Menon	
2003	Mizhi Randilum	Thampi	
2003	Ivar	S. K. Nair	
2003	Valathottu Thirinjal Nalamathe Veedu	Ajith's uncle	
2004	Thalamelam	Kochousepp	
2004	Kottaram Vaidyan	Marthandan	
2004	Vamanapuram Bus Route	Bahuleyan	
2004	Sethurama Iyer CBI	Ouseppachan	
2004	Udayam	Krishna Menon	
2004	Njan Salperu Ramankutty	Narayanan	
2004	Kanninum Kannadikkum	Narayanan	
2004	Chathikkatha Chanthu	Thampuran	
2004	Vettam	Fernandes	
2004	Natturajavu	Father Pappy	
2004	Black	Aasan	
2004	Kadhavaseshan	Veerabhadran Nair/Kuttammavan	
2005	Five Fingers	Fr. Nedumbaran	
2005	Udayananu Tharam	Madhumathi's father	
2005	Immini Nalloraal	Bhaskara Pillai	
2005	Thommanum Makkalum	Panikkar	
2005	Alice in Wonderland	Mani Kuruvilla	
2005	Rappakal	Sankaran Kuttiyar	
2005	Kadha	Madhava Menon	
2005	The Tiger	Ahamed Sahib	
2006	Jayam		
2006	Madhuchandralekha		
2006	Rashtram	Keshava Menon	
2006	Kilukkam Kilukilukkam	Sankaran Potty	
2006	Thuruppu Gulan	Peethambaran	
2006	Chess	Easwara Varma	
2006	Nottam	Menon	
2006	Red Salute	Medayil Ittichan	
2006	Pathaaka	Muhammed Mash	
2006	Kanaka Simhasanam	Upendra Varma	
2007	Inspector Garud	Krishnan Namboothiri	
2007	Paranju Theeratha Visheshangal	Raghavan Nair	
2007	Panthaya Kozhi	Sankaran Nair	
2007	Khaki	Bahuleyan	
2007	July 4	Lokanathan	
2007	Hallo	M. N. Nambiar	
2007	Nazrani	Thampi	
2008	Magic Lamp	Anandan	
2008	De Ingottu Nokkiye		
2008	Raudram	Chief Minister	
2008	College Kumaran	V Narendranath	
2008	Malabar Wedding	Paappan	
2008	Annan Thambi	Ravunni	
2008	Mayabazar	Kuriayachan	
2008	Twenty:20	Ramakrishnapilla	
2008	Crazy Gopalan	Narayana Kurup	
2009	Kadha, Samvidhanam Kunchakko	Chief Minister	
2009	Aayirathil Oruvan	Eenasu	
2009	Sanmanasullavan Appukuttan	Lambodharan Pilla	
2009	Samastha Keralam PO	Valiya Ammavan	
2009	Oru Black and White Kudumbam	Madhava Varma	
2009	Utharaswayamvaram	Vasu	
2009	Moz & Cat	Avutha	
2009	Seetha Kalyanam	Thiruvattar Thankavelu	
2009	Makante Achan	Kurup	
2009	Love In Singapore		
2009	2 Harihar Nagar	Fr. Stephen Varghese	
2009	Ee Pattanathil Bhootham	Philipose	
2009	Loudspeaker	Grandpa	
2009	Chattambinadu	Vadival Vasu	

==== 2010s ====
Year	Title	Role	Notes
2010	Body Guard	Balakrishna Menon	
2010	Annarakkannanum Thannalayathu	Muthupandi Chettiar	
2010	Bombay Mittayi		
2010	Kaaryasthan		
2010	Malarvaadi Arts Club	Nelloor Gopalan	
2010	Mummy & Me	Fr. Felix	
2010	Pramani	Castro Vareeth	
2010	Best of Luck	Kuzhithura Ponnappan	
2010	Chekavar	P.M.V.	
2010	Elsamma Enna Aankutty	Balan Pillai	
2010	Kudumbasree Travels	Mullasery Raveendra Chakyar	
2011	Lavender		
2011	Makeup Man	Paul, Film producer	
2011	Payyans	Brittas's father	
2011	Violin		
2011	Ulakam Chuttum Valiban	Jayashankar's uncle	
2011	Maharaja Talkies		
2011	Lucky Jokers	Madhava Varma Thampuran	
2011	Nadakame Ulakam	Aanni Kurup	
2011	Venicile Vyapari	Raghuramavarma	
2012	Mullassery Madhavan Kutty Nemom P. O.		
2012	The King & the Commissioner	Central Minister G. K	
2012	Trivandrum Lodge	Arthur Gopal Relton	
2012	Madirasi	Kurup	
2012	Karmayodha	Narayana Menon	
2012	Naughty Professor		
2012	Ee Thirakkinidayil		
2012	Theevram	S.P Varma	
2012	Namukku Parkkan	Krishnan Ammavan	
2012	Thiruvambadi Thamban	Kunjachan	
2013	Nadodimannan	Damodharan	
2013	Maad Dad	Mamachan	
2013	Proprietors: Kammath & Kammath	Thirumeni	
2013	Black Butterfly	Lazer	
2013	Careebeyans	Chief Minister	
2013	Vallatha Pahayan		
2013	KQ		
2014	Mannar Mathai Speaking 2	Garvasees Aasan	
2014	Salalah Mobiles	Kodaangi	Guest appearance
2014	Ettekaal Second		
2014	Konthayum Poonoolum	Baby	
2015	Bhaskar the Rascal	Sankara Narayanan Pillai	
2015	Utopiayile Rajavu	Vasavan Pillai	
2016	Savam		
2016	Marupadi		
2017	Fukri	Venkatesh Iyer	
2017	Georgettan's Pooram		
2017	Rakshadhikari Baiju Oppu	Narayanan	
2017	Lavakusha	Sathyan, film producer	
2017	Masterpiece	Chief Minister	
2018	Captain	K. Karunakaran	
2018	Panchavarnathatha	Bride's Father	
2018	Abrahaminte Santhathikal	Priest	
2018	Aanakkallan		
2019	Kalikoottukkar		
2019	Oru Yamandan Premakadha	Davis's Grandfather	Cameo
2019	Kuttymama		
2019	Vishudha Pusthakam		
2019	Pattabhiraman	Varma	
2019	Jack & Daniel	Kerala CM	

==== 2020s ====
Year	Title	Role	Notes
2020	Big Brother	Valliyammavan	
2022	Kaduva	Chief Minister Ananthanathan	
2022	Paappan	Dr. Pattabhiraman	
2022	Autorickshawkarante Bharya	French Vasu	
2023	Christopher	Chief Minister	
2023	2018	Chief Minister	
2023	Voice of Sathyanathan	Vaidyar	
2024	Oru Kattil Oru Muri		
2024	Oru Anweshanathinte Thudakkam		
2025	Hridayapoorvam	Chittappan	
2025	Sarvam Maya	Prahladan Namboothiri	

=== Web series ===
Year	Title	Role	Language	Notes
2024	Nagendran's Honeymoons	Avarachan	Malayalam	Disney+ Hotstar

=== As dubbing artist ===
Year	Film	For Whom	Character
2003	Magic Magic 3D	Al Dioro	Thief in wheelchair

== Television ==
- Mahathma Gandhi Colony (Asianet)
- Ashtapadi (Surya TV)
- Kanthari
- Badai Bungalow (Asianet)
- Adutha Bullodu Koodi (Zee Keralam)
- Surabhiyum Suhasiniyum (Flowers TV)
- Uppum Mulakum (Flowers TV)
