= Nanayam =

- Directed by: I. V. Sasi
- Written by: T. Damodaran
- Screenplay by: T. Damodaran
- Starring: Madhu; Mammootty; Mohanlal; Seema; Poornima Jayaram; Srividya
- Cinematography: C. E. Babu
- Edited by: K. Narayanan
- Music by: Shyam
- Production company: CS Productions
- Distributed by: Century Release Producer/financier= P.Abraham Itty
- Release date: 21 October 1983
- Country: India
- Language: Malayalam

Nanayam (or Naanayam) (transl. Coin) is a 1983 Indian Malayalam-language drama film directed by I. V. Sasi and written by T. Damodaran. The film stars Madhu, Mammootty, Mohanlal, Seema, Poornima Jayaram, and Srividya. It is the story of two step brothers, Babu and Raju, who takes over the business of their parents, and the problems they encounter while running it. The music was composed by Shyam. This movie also portrays an onscreen kiss between Mohanlal and Mamooty.

== Cast ==
- Madhu as Vishwanathan
- Mammootty as Raju
- Mohanlal as Babu
- Seema as Sindhu
- Poornima Bhagyaraj as Maya
- Srividya as Sumathi
- V D Rajappan as tuition teacher
- Sukumari
- Poornima Jayaram as Maya
- Adoor Bhasi as Advocate
- Janardanan
- K. P. Ummer as Krishnapuram Thamby
- Paravoor Bharathan as Bharagavan
- Santhosh as Mohanlal's friend

== Soundtrack ==
The music was composed by Shyam and the lyrics were written by Yusufali Kechery and Poovachal Khader.

No.	Song	Singers	Lyrics	Length (m:ss)
1	"Ghanashyaama Varnnaa Kanna"	Vani Jairam	Yusufali Kechery	
2	"Hai Murari" (Bit)	Vani Jairam	Yusufali Kechery	
3	"Maankidaave Vaa"	K. J. Yesudas, P. Susheela	Yusufali Kechery	
4	"Pom Pom" (Bit)	Vani Jairam, Unni Menon	Yusufali Kechery	
5	"Pom Pom Ee Jeeppinu Madamilaki"	K. J. Yesudas, P. Jayachandran	Yusufali Kechery	
6	"Pranaya Swaram Hrudaya Swaram"	P. Jayachandran, Krishnachandran	Poovachal Khader	
7	"Pranayaswaram Hridayaswaram" (Bit)	P. Susheela, P. Jayachandran	Poovachal Khader	

This movie was extensively shot in and around Kottayam, India
