= Pappanamkodu Lakshmanan =

Malayalam film actor

Pappanamcode Lakshmanan
- Born: S. Lakshmanan; 6 December 1936; Trivandrum, Travancore
- Died: 30 January 1998 (aged 61); Chennai, Tamil Nadu
- Occupations: screenwriter, lyricist
- Years active: 1976-1995

Pappanamcode Lakshmanan was an Indian film scriptwriter, screen play writer and lyricist in Malayalam movies during the 1970s and 1980s. He started his career with Indulekha in 1967. He contributed to around 100 Malayalam movies across storytelling, scriptwriting, dialogue, and lyrics.

== Filmography ==
=== Dialogue ===
- Udyaanalakshmi (1976)
- Pick Pocket (1976)
- Kayamkulam Kochunniyude Makan (1976)
- Ammaayi Amma (1977)
- Muttathe Mulla (1977)
- Randu Lokam (1977)
- Minimol (1977)
- Rathimanmadhan (1977)
- Ninakku Njaanum Enikku Neeyum (1978)
- Aanakkalari (1978)
- Mattoru Karnan (1978)
- Kanalkattakal (1978)
- Sundarimaarude Swapnangal (1978)
- Velluvili (1978)
- Praarthana (1978)
- Mudramothiram (1978)
- Bhaaryayum Kaamukiyumm (1978)
- Saayoojyam (1979)
- Ankakkuri (1979)
- Indradhanussu (1979)
- Vellayani Paramu (1979)
- Moorkhan (1980)
- Chandrahaasam (1980)
- Manushyamrugam (1980)
- Theenaalangal (1980)
- Kari Puranda Jeevithangal (1980)
- Nizhalyudham (1981)
- Ithihasam (1981)
- Sharam (1982)
- Dheera (1982)
- Bheeman (1982)
- Kaaliya Mardhanam (1982)
- Pooviriyum Pulari (1982)
- Aarambham (1982)
- Aadarsham (1982)
- Nagamadathu Thampuratti (1982)
- Ankam (1983)
- Kodumkattu (1983)
- Justice Raja (1983)
- Thaavalam (1983)
- Passport (1983)
- Kolakomban (1983)
- Ivide Ingane (1984)
- Kurishuyudham (1984)
- NH 47 (1984)
- Oru Sumangaliyude Katha (1984)
- Onnamprathi Olivil (1986)
- Bhavan (1986)
- Veendum Lisa (1987)

=== Screenplay ===
- Udyaanalakshmi (1976)
- Pick Pocket (1976)
- Kaayamkulam Kochunniyude Makan (1976)
- Ammaayi Amma (1977)
- Minimol (1977)
- Rathimanmadhan (1977)
- Ninakku Njaanum Enikku Neeyum (1978)
- Aanakkalari (1978)
- Mattoru Karnan (1978)
- Kanalkattakal (1978)
- Ammavanu Pattiya Amali (1989)

=== Story ===
- Udyaanalakshmi (1976)
- Pick Pocket (1976)
- Kaayamkulam Kochunniyude Makan (1976)
- Ammaayi Amma (1977)
- Minimol (1977)
- Rathimanmadhan (1977)
- Ninakku Njaanum Enikku Neeyum (1978)
- Aanakkalari (1978)
- Mattoru Karnan (1978)
- Kanalkattakal (1978)

=== Cast ===
- Indulekha (1967)

=== Lyrics ===
- Mahabali (1984)
