= Chirayinkeezhu Ramakrishnan Nair =

Indian lyricist

- Ramakrishnan Nair in the UAE, 1991
- Born: 30 October 1936; Chirayinkeezhu, Kingdom of Travancore, British Raj (present day Thiruvananthapuram, Kerala, India
- Died: 1 January 1994 (aged 57); Thiruvananthapuram,Kerala, India
- Education: University of Kerala
- Occupations: Lyricist; Writer; Lecturer

Chirayinkeezhu Ramakrishnan Nair (30 October 1936 – 1 January 1994) was a Malayalam lyricist from Kerala. He also served as a lecturer in Madras Presidency College. He penned the lyrics for around 30 Malayalam movies.

Ramakrishnan alias Chirayinkeezhu Ramakrishnan nair started writing poetry at a young age. His friendship with Prem Nazir gave him the opportunity to write songs for Malayalam films. His first movie, Innale Innu, was released in 1977. He wrote the song 'Swarnayavanikakkullile Swapnanadakam' from the film. After onwards, he went to write lyrics for around 20 songs and 100 songs.
