= List of Malayalam songs recorded by Vani Jairam =

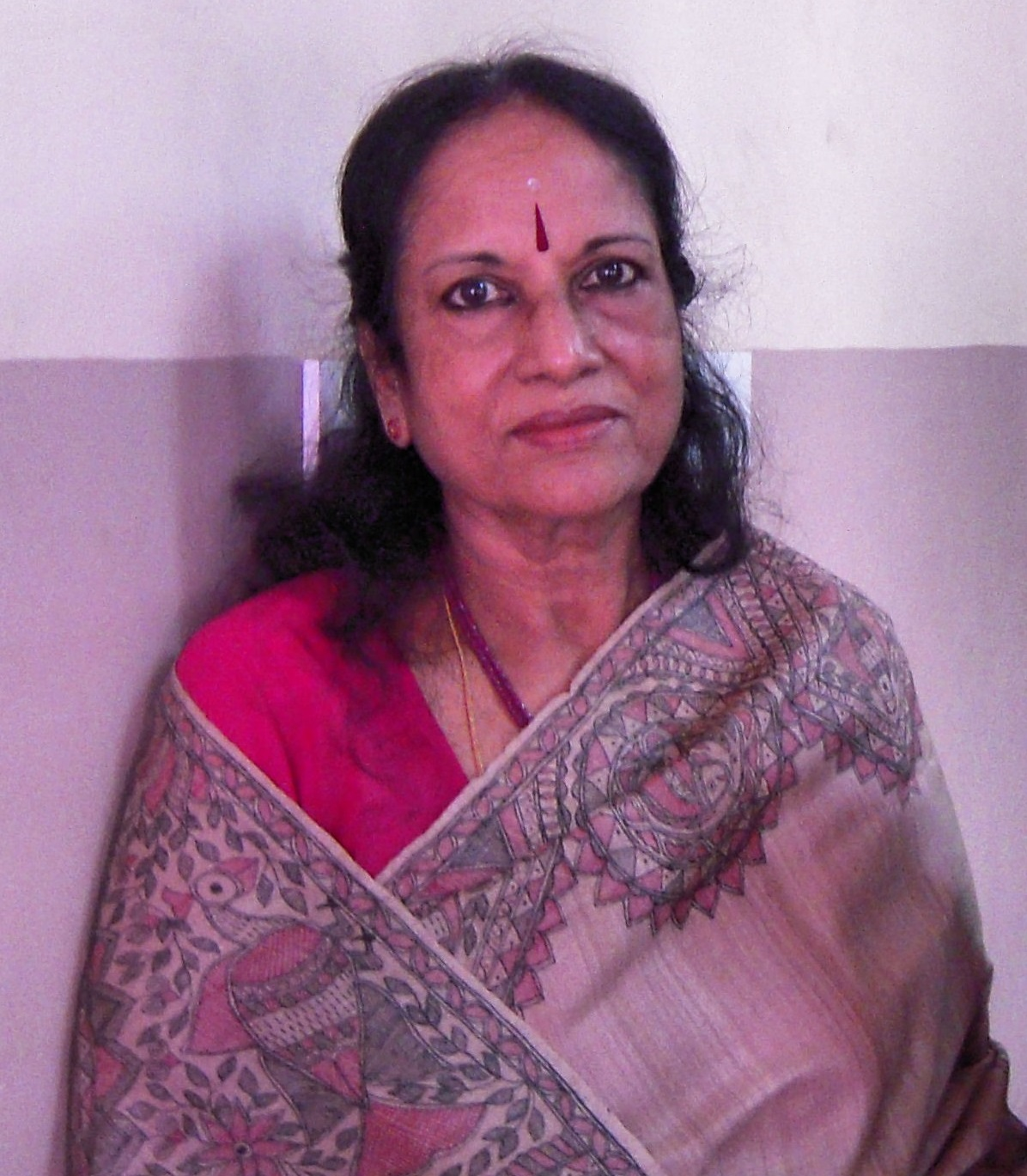
Vani Jairam

Vani Jairam (30 November 1945 – 4 February 2023) was an Indian singer who has sung over 20,000 songs in various Indian languages. She recorded her first Malayalam film song in 1973 for the film, Swapnam. Following this, she went on to record around 600 Malayalam film songs until her last song, "Puthumazhayil" for the film, Madhaveeyam (2019).

Vani recorded maximum Malayalam songs for music directors such as M. K. Arjunan, Salil Chowdhary and R. K. Shekhar. Her maximum duet songs were paired up with K. J. Yesudas followed by P. Jayachandran.

The following is a list of Malayalam film songs recorded by her:

== Before 1990s ==
=== 1970s ===
| Year | Film | Song | Music director | Writer | Co-singer | Ref |
|---|---|---|---|---|---|---|
| 1973 | Swapnam | "Sourayudhathil" | Salil Chowdhury | O. N. V. Kurup | Solo | |
| 1974 | Ayalathe Sundari | "Chithravarnapushpajaalamorukki" | Shankar Ganesh | Mankombu Gopalakrishnan | Solo | |
| 1975 | Babumon | "Padmatheerthakkarayil" | M. S. Viswanathan | Mankombu Gopalakrishnan | Solo | |
| 1975 | Thamarathoni | "Ithu Sisiram" | R. K. Shekhar | Vayalar Ramavarma | Solo | |
| 1975 | Pravaham | "Maavinte Kombilirunnoru" | M. K. Arjunan | Sreekumaran Thampi | K. J. Yesudas | |
| 1975 | Manishada | "Kalyaanamaala" | G. Devarajan | Kannadasan | Solo | |
| 1975 | Manishada | "Kanyakumariyum Kashmeerum" | G. Devarajan | Vayalar Ramavarma | P. Madhuri, B. Vasantha | |
| 1975 | Love Marriage | "Kaaminimaarkkullil" | Ahuan Sebastian | Mankombu Gopalakrishnan | Ambili | |
| 1975 | Picnic | "Vaalkkannezhuthi" | M. K. Arjunan | Sreekumaran Thampi | K. J. Yesudas | |
| 1975 | Ullasa Yaathra | "Anuraagamennaaloru" | M. S. Viswanathan | Sreekumaran Thampi | K. J. Yesudas | |
| 1975 | Sammanam | "Ente Kayyil Poothiri" | V. Dakshinamoorthy | Vayalar Ramavarma | Solo | |
| 1975 | Sammanam | "Kaattuchennu Kalebaram" | V. Dakshinamoorthy | Vayalar Ramavarma | Solo | |
| 1975 | Chandanachola | "Lovely Evening" | K. J. Joy | Konniyoor Bhas | Solo | |
| 1975 | Thomasleeha | "Dhum Dhumthana" | Salil Chowdhary | Vayalar Ramavarma | Solo | |
| 1975 | Pulivalu | "Lajjaavathi" | M. K. Arjunan | Sreekumaran Thampi | K. J. Yesudas | |
| 1975 | Alibabayum 41 Kallanmaarum | "Yakshi Njaanoru Yakshi" | G. Devarajan | Vayalar Ramavarma | Solo | |
| 1975 | Raagam | "Naadanpaattile Maina" | Salil Chowdhary | Vayalar Ramavarma | Solo | |
| 1975 | Raasaleela | "Aayilyam Paadathe Penne" | Salil Chowdhary | Vayalar Ramavarma | K. J. Yesudas | |
| 1975 | Thiruvonam | "Thiruvonapularithan" | M. K. Arjunan | Sreekumaran Thampi | Solo | |
| 1975 | Makkal | "Raam Banaaye" | G. Devarajan | Rajbal Devaraj | Solo | |
| 1975 | Omanakkunju | "Swapnathilinnale" | M. K. Arjunan | Sreekumaran Thampi | Solo | |
| 1975 | Padmaragam | "Kaattuvannu Thottaneram | M. K. Arjunan | Sreekumaran Thampi | K. J. Yesudas | |
| 1975 | Sindhu | "En Chiriyo Poothiri" | M. K. Arjunan | Sreekumaran Thampi | K. J. Yesudas | |
| 1975 | Sindhu | "Thedithhedi" | M. K. Arjunan | Sreekumaran Thampi | | |
| 1975 | Priye Ninakku Vendi | "Njaan Niranja Madhupaathram" | R. K. Shekhar | Bharanikkavu Sivakumar | Solo | |
| 1976 | Agni Pushpam | "Anuraagathinanuraagam" | M. K. Arjunan | O. N. V. Kurup | K. J. Yesudas | |
| 1976 | Paalkkadal | "Divaaswapnaminnenikkoru" | A. T. Ummer | Sreekumaran Thampi | P. Madhuri | |
| 1976 | Paalkkadal | "Kunkumapottiloorum" | A. T. Ummer | Sreekumaran Thampi | Solo | |
| 1976 | Amma | "Chandrakiranangal" | M. K. Arjunan | Sreekumaran Thampi | Srikanth | |
| 1976 | Amma | "Rathisukhasaare" | M. K. Arjunan | Sreekumaran Thampi | Solo | |
| 1976 | Yudhabhoomi | "Aashaada Maasam" | R. K. Shekhar | Mankombu Gopalakrishnan | Solo | |
| 1976 | Swimming Pool | "Kanna Karimukil Varnna" | M. K. Arjunan | P. Bhaskaran | Solo | |
| 1976 | Prasaadam | "Gaanathin Kalloliniyil" | V. Dakshinamoorthy | P. Bhaskaran | Solo | |
| 1976 | Pushpasharam | "Chandrikachaarthinte" | M. S. Baburaj | Anwar Suber | K. J. Yesudas | |
| 1976 | Panchami | "Theyyathom" | M. S. Viswanathan | Yusufali Kechery | Solo | |
| 1976 | Kuttavum Shikshayum | "Malarilum Manassilum" | M. S. Viswanathan | Mankombu Gopalakrishnan | Solo | |
| 1976 | Lakshmi Vijayam | "Naayaka Paalaka" | Shyam | Mullanezhi | Solo | |
| 1976 | Chottanikkara Amma | "Panchami Chandrikayil" | R. K. Shekhar | Bharanikkavu Sivakumar | Ambili, Jayashree | |
| 1976 | Vazhivilakku | "Unarunnu Njanurunnu" | V. Dakshinamoorthy | P. Bhaskaran | Solo | |
| 1976 | Kanyaadaanam | "Vaasarasankalpathin" | M. K. Arjunan | Sreekumaran Thampi | Solo | |
| 1976 | Aayiram Janmangal | "Mullamaala Choodivanna" | M. S. Viswanathan | P. Bhaskaran | Solo | |
| 1976 | Rajaankanam | "Velichamevide" | M. K. Arjunan | Nelson | Solo | |
| 1976 | Pick Pocket | "Swapnahaaramaninjethum" | M. K. Arjunan | Pappanamkodu Lakshmanan | P. Jayachandran | |
| 1976 | Paarijatham | "Chundil Virinjathu" | M. K. Arjunan | Sreekumaran Thampi | P. Jayachandran | |
| 1976 | Kamadhenu | "Kannuneerinu Taataa" | Shankar Ganesh | Yusufali Kechery | P. Jayachandran | |
| 1977 | Siva Thandavum | "Anthimayangiyilla" | M. B. Sreenivasan | Perumpuzha Gopalakrishnan | Solo | |
| 1977 | Siva Thandavum | "Uduthorungiya" | M. B. Sreenivasan | Perumpuzha Gopalakrishnan | Solo | |
| 1977 | Aparadhi | "Maamalayile Poomaram" | Salil Chowdhary | P. Bhaskaran | Jolly Abraham | |
| 1977 | Aasheervaadam | "Seemantharekhayil Chandanamchaarthiya" | M. K. Arjunan | Bharanikkavu Sivakumar | Solo | |
| 1977 | Sankhupushpam | "Sapthaswarangaaladum" | M. K. Arjunan | Sreekumaran Thampi | Solo | |
| 1977 | Madhura Swapanam | "Makara Maasa" | M. K. Arjunan | Sreekumaran Thampi | Solo | |
| 1977 | Makam Piranna Manka | "Kaakkikkuppaayakkaara" | V. Dakshinamoorthy | Ettumanoor Somadasan | Solo | |
| 1977 | Kaduvaye Pidicha Kiduva | "Mounamithenthe Maayaavi" | V. Dakshinamoorthy | Sreekumaran Thampi | Solo | |
| 1977 | Kannappanunni | "Mankamaare Mayakkunna" | K. Raghavan | P. Bhaskaran | P. Susheela | |
| 1977 | Kannappanunni | "Panchavarnnakkilivaalan" | K. Raghavan | P. Bhaskaran | K. J. Yesudas | |
| 1977 | Vishukkani | "Kannil Poovu" | Salil Chowdhary | Sreekumaran Thampi | Solo | |
| 1977 | Mohavum Mukthiyum | "Bhagavaan Anuraagavasantham" | M. K. Arjunan | Sreekumaran Thampi | B. Vasantha | |
| 1977 | Amme Anupame | "Paachotti Pookkunna" | M. S. Viswanathan | Mankombu Gopalakrishnan | Solo | |
| 1977 | Amme Anupame | "Thudikkum Manassile" | M. S. Viswanathan | Mankombu Gopalakrishnan | K. J. Yesudas | |
| 1977 | Ashtamangalyam | "Sahyagiriyude" | M. K. Arjunan | Kanam E. J. | P. Jayachandran | |
| 1977 | Sangamam | "Manmadha Gandharva" | M. S. Viswanathan | Mankombu Gopalakrishnan | K. J. Yesudas | |
| 1977 | Sangamam | "Sahasra Kamaladalangal" | M. S. Viswanathan | Mankombu Gopalakrishnan | Solo | |
| 1977 | Niraparayum Nilavilakkum | "Sharanam Tharanamamme" | V. Dakshinamoorthy | Sreekumaran Thampi | Ambili | |
| 1977 | Kaavilamma | "Mangalaambike Maaye" | G. Devarajan | O. N. V. Kurup | Solo | |
| 1977 | Sukradasa | "Last Night" | M. K. Arjunan | Mankombu Gopalakrishnan | Solo | |
| 1977 | Ormakal Marikkumo | "Thriprayaarappa Sree Rama" | M. S. Viswanathan | Mankombu Gopalakrishnan | Solo | |
| 1977 | Yatheem | "Manippiraave Ninte Kalithozhaninnu" | M. S. Baburaj | P. Bhaskaran | L. R. Eswari | |
| 1977 | Muhoorthangal | "Muthum Pavizhavum" | M. K. Arjunan | O. N. V. Kurup | Solo | |
| 1977 | Bhaaryaavijayam | "Madhuvidhuvin Maadhavamen" | M. K. Arjunan | Sreekumaran Thampi | Solo | |
| 1977 | Yudhakandam | "Ithirippoove" | K. Raghavan | O. N. V. Kurup | B. Vasantha | |
| 1977 | Yudhakandam | "Ponnumkudathinoru" | K. Raghavan | O. N. V. Kurup | Solo | |
| 1977 | Santha Oru Devatha | "Madhuvidhu Raathrikal" | M. K. Arjunan | Sreekumaran Thampi | P. Jayachandran | |
| 1977 | Santha Oru Devatha | "Nilavilakkin Thiri" | M. K. Arjunan | Sreekumaran Thampi | Solo | |
| 1977 | Santha Oru Devatha | "Omanappoomukham" | M. K. Arjunan | Sreekumaran Thampi | K. J. Yesudas | |
| 1977 | Aadhya Paadam | "Pushpamangalya Raathriyil" | A. T. Ummer | Sreekumaran Thampi | K. P. Brahmanandan | |
| 1977 | Tholkan Enikku Manassilla | "Vayanaadin Maanam" | Shankar Ganesh | Mankombu Gopalakrishnan | Solo | |
| 1977 | Thaalappoli | "Sreevaazhum Kovilil" | V. Dakshinamoorthy | Cheri Viswanath | Solo | |
| 1977 | Akshayapaathram | "Madhuramulla Nombaram" | M. S. Viswanathan | Sreekumaran Thampi | Solo | |
| 1978 | Aalmaaraattam | "Arinju Sakhi" | M. K. Arjunan | P. Venu | Solo | |
| 1978 | Kaathirunna Nimisham | "Punchirichal" | M. K. Arjunan | Sreekumaran Thampi | P. Jayachandran | |
| 1978 | Rowdy Ramu | "Gaaname Prema Gaaname" | Shyam | Bichu Thirumala | K. J. Yesudas | |
| 1978 | Rowdy Ramu | "Manjin Thereri" | Shyam | Bichu Thirumala | S. Janaki | |
| 1978 | Kanyaka | "Enthinu Swarnamayoora" | M. K. Arjunan | Pappanamkodu Lakshmanan | K. J. Yesudas | |
| 1978 | Society Lady | "Karimbu Villu" | K. J. Joy | Mankombu Gopalakrishnan | Solo | |
| 1978 | Randilonnu | "Thaarake Rajatha Thaarake" | M. S. Viswanathan | Mankombu Gopalakrishnan | Solo | |
| 1978 | Aval Viswasthayayirunnu | "Thirayum Theeravum" | M. K. Arjunan | Kanam E. J. | Solo | |
| 1978 | Aarum Anyaralla | "Madhura Youvana Lahari" | M. K. Arjunan | Sathyan Anthikkad | Solo | |
| 1978 | Black Belt | "Maamala Vazhum" | Shyam | Bharanikkavu Sivakumar | S. Janaki | |
| 1978 | Black Belt | "Maanodunna" | Shyam | Bharanikkavu Sivakumar | P. Jayachandran | |
| 1978 | Manoradham | "Chirakaala Kaamitha" | V. Dakshinamoorthy | P. Bhaskaran | Solo | |
| 1978 | Manoradham | "Madhura Swarga" | V. Dakshinamoorthy | P. Bhaskaran | K. J. Yesudas | |
| 1978 | Avakaasham | "Olappeeppi Oothi" | M. K. Arjunan | Gopi Kottarapat | Solo | |
| 1978 | Seemanthini | "Sundara Surabhila" | Jaya Vijaya | Biju Ponneth | Jolly Abraham | |
| 1978 | Padmatheertham | "Samayam Saayam Sandhya" | K. V. Mahadevan | Mankombu Gopalakrishnan | Solo | |
| 1978 | Pichipoo | "Omanakuttan Govindan" | Jaya Vijaya | P. Bhaskaran | K. J. Yesudas | |
| 1978 | Uthrada Rathri | "Manju Pozhiyunnu" | Jaya Vijaya | Bichu Thirumala | Solo | |
| 1978 | Onappudava | "Aavanipponnoonjaalil Aadiva" | M. B. Sreenivasan | O. N. V. Kurup | Solo | |
| 1978 | Balapareekshanam | "Pullippuli Pole" | M. K. Arjunan | Mankombu Gopalakrishnan | P. Jayachandran | |
| 1978 | Premashilpi | "Amme Amme" | V. Dakshinamoorthy | Sreekumaran Thampi | Solo | |
| 1978 | Premashilpi | "Kathirmandapathil" | V. Dakshinamoorthy | Sreekumaran Thampi | Solo | |
| 1978 | Chakraayudham | "Gamayeriyaal" | K. J. Joy | Mankombu Gopalakrishnan | Solo | |
| 1978 | Nivedyam | "Kavilathenikkoru" | G. Devarajan | Mankombu Gopalakrishnan | P. Jayachandran | |
| 1978 | Randu Janmam | "Ormakal Oramakal" | M. G. Radhakrishnan | Kavalam Narayana Panicker | Solo | |
| 1978 | Thacholi Ambu | "Naadappuram Palliyile" | K. Raghavan | Yusufali Kechery | Solo | |
| 1978 | Mukkuvane Snehicha Bhootham | "Aazhithiramaalakal" | K. J. Joy | Anwar Suber | Idava Basheer | |
| 1978 | Asthamayam | "Paal Pozhiyum Mozhi" | Shyam | Sreekumaran Thampi | P. Jayachandran | |
| 1978 | Mattoru Karnan | "Kaattinte Karavalayathil" | K. J. Joy | Chavara Gopi | P. Jayachandran | |
| 1978 | Mattoru Karnan | "Thalakkanam Koodum" | K. J. Joy | Chavara Gopi | Solo | |
| 1978 | Avalku Maranamilla | "Navaneetha Chandrike" | G. Devarajan | Mankombu Gopalakrishnan | Solo | |
| 1978 | Bhrashtu | "Thechi Poothe" | M. S. Baburaj | Naattika Sivaram | Solo | |
| 1978 | Beena | "Oru Swapnathin" | Kannur Rajan | Appan Thacheth | P. Susheela | |
| 1978 | Aanakkalari | "Ganapathiye Sharanam" | M. K. Arjunan | Sreekumaran Thampi | Solo | |
| 1978 | Bandhanam | "Raagam Sreeraagam" | M. B. Sreenivasan | O. N. V. Kurup | Leela Menon | |
| 1978 | Ee Ganam Marakkumo | "Kurumozhi Mullappoove" | Salil Chowdhary | O. N. V. Kurup | K. J. Yesudas | |
| 1978 | Sthree Oru Dukham | "Chirikkunna Puzhakkoru" | Joshi | K. Narayanapilla | Solo | |
| 1978 | Tiger Salim | "Paambaadum Paarayil" | Shyam | Bichu Thirumala | P. Jayachandran, Ambili | |
| 1978 | Thanal | "Neelime Raagasindhoora" | Jithin Shyam | Bichu Thirumala | Solo | |
| 1978 | Nakshatrangale Kaaval | "Kaashithumbe" | G. Devarajan | O. N. V. Kurup | Solo | |
| 1978 | Yagaswam | "Krishnapriyadalam" | G. Devarajan | Mankombu Gopalakrishnan | Solo | |
| 1979 | Angakkuri | "Mani Muzhangi Kovil" | A. T. Ummer | Bichu Thirumala | Solo | |
| 1979 | Pancharathnam | "Villu Kulaykku" | Shyam | Kaniyapuram Ramachandran | S. P. Balasubrahmanyam | |
| 1979 | Raathrikal Ninakku Vendi | "Sree Raajaraajeshwari" | A. T. Ummer | Mankombu Gopalakrishnan | Solo | |
| 1979 | Ival Oru Naadody | "Hoy Hoy Hoy" | S. D. Sekhar | Dr. Shahjahan | Solo | |
| 1979 | Manushyan | "Hamsapaadangalil" | V. Dakshinamoorthy | Bharanikkavu Sivakumar | Solo | |
| 1979 | Vadaka Veedu | "Maarivillinte Panthal" | M. S. Viswanathan | Bichu Thirumala | Solo | |
| 1979 | Kaalam Kaathu Ninnilla | "Manjalakalil" | A. T. Ummer | Mankombu Gopalakrishnan | Solo | |
| 1979 | Kaalam Kaathu Ninnilla | "Swargamundenkil" | A. T. Ummer | Mankombu Gopalakrishnan | Solo | |
| 1979 | Sarapancharam | "Saaraswatha Madhuventhum" | G. Devarajan | Yusufali Kechery | Solo | |
| 1979 | Kaumarapraayam | "Makarasankramaraathriyil" | Shyam | Chunakkara Ramankutty | Jolly Abraham | |
| 1979 | Rakthamillatha Manushyan | "Etho Kinaavinte" | M. K. Arjunan | Sathyan Anthikkad | Solo | |
| 1979 | Irumbazhikal | "Cherukiliye" | M. K. Arjunan | R. K. Damodaran | Solo | |
| 1979 | Irumbazhikal | "Mindaappenne Mandippenne" | M. K. Arjunan | R. K. Damodaran | P. Jayachandran | |
| 1979 | Allauddinum Albhutha Vilakkum | "Pushpame" | G. Devarajan | Yusufali Kechery | Solo | |
| 1979 | Allauddinum Albhutha Vilakkum | "Sringara Ponkinnam" | G. Devarajan | Yusufali Kechery | Solo | |
| 1979 | Ajnaatha Theerangal | "Oru Raathriyum" | M. K. Arjunan | Sreekumaran Thampi | Solo | |
| 1979 | Ajnaatha Theerangal | "Vasantha Radhathil" | M. K. Arjunan | Sreekumaran Thampi | Solo | |
| 1979 | Ajnaatha Theerangal | "Oru Poovinenthu Sugandham" | M. K. Arjunan | Sreekumaran Thampi | K. J. Yesudas | |
| 1979 | Itha Oru Theeram | "Raajakumaran Pandoru" | K. J. Joy | Yusufali Kechery | P. Jayachandran | |
| 1979 | Itha Oru Theeram | "Thaalolam Kili Raareeram" | K. J. Joy | Yusufali Kechery | P. Jayachandran | |
| 1979 | Anupallavi | "Neeraattu En Maanasaraani" | K. J. Joy | Vijayan | P. Jayachandran | |
| 1979 | Radha Enna Pennkutti | "Moham Daaham" | Shyam | Devadas | Solo | |
| 1979 | Mani Koya Kurup | "Aruthe Aruthe" | M. S. Viswanathan | P. Bhaskaran | Solo | |
| 1979 | Avano Atho Avalo | "Vellathilezhuthiya" | M. K. Arjunan | Bichu Thirumala | Solo | |
| 1979 | Kayalum Kayarum | "Kadakkanniloru Kadal Kandu" | K. V. Mahadevan | Poovachal Khader | Solo | |
| 1979 | Sayoojyam | "Maranjirunnaalum" | K. J. Joy | Yusufali Kechery | Solo | |
| 1979 | Yakshi Paaru | "Aaromal Ponmakale" | M. K. Arjunan | Pappanamkodu Lakshmanan | Solo | |
| 1979 | Yakshi Paaru | "Manmadhapuriyile" | M. K. Arjunan | Pappanamkodu Lakshmanan | P. Jayachandran | |
| 1979 | Manasa Vacha Karmana | "Nimishangal Polum" | A. T. Ummer | Bichu Thirumala | Jolly Abraham | |
| 1979 | Manasa Vacha Karmana | "Nimishangal Polum" (solo) | A. T. Ummer | Bichu Thirumala | Solo | |
| 1979 | Venalil Oru Mazha | "Akaasham Akaleyannaaru" | M. S. Viswanathan | Sreekumaran Thampi | Solo | |
| 1979 | Venalil Oru Mazha | "Ethu Panthal Kandaalum" | M. S. Viswanathan | Sreekumaran Thampi | Solo | |
| 1979 | Maamaankam | "Adithozhunnen" | K. Raghavan | P. Bhaskaran | K. J. Yesudas | |
| 1979 | Maamaankam | "Varutha Pachari" | K. Raghavan | P. Bhaskaran | K. J. Yesudas | |
| 1979 | Ezhamkadalinakkare | "Malaranippanthalil" | M. S. Viswanathan | P. Bhaskaran | Solo | |
| 1979 | Ezhamkadalinakkare | "Suralokajaladhaara" | M. S. Viswanathan | P. Bhaskaran | Jolly Abraham | |
| 1979 | Sarpam | "Aayiram Thalayulla" | K. J. Joy | Bichu Thirumala | P. Jayachandran, B. Vasantha | |
| 1979 | Sarpam | "Ezhaam Maalikamele" | K. J. Joy | Bichu Thirumala | K. J. Yesudas | |
| 1979 | Sarpam | "Swarnameeninte Chelotha" | K. J. Joy | Bichu Thirumala | K. J. Yesudas, P. Susheela, S. P. Balasubrahmanyam | |
| 1979 | Oru Raagam Pala Thaalam | "Kanakachilankachaarthum" | M. S. Viswanathan | Sreekumaran Thampi | Solo | |
| 1979 | Pathivritha | "Shankhumukham Kadappurathoru" | M. S. Viswanathan | Bichu Thirumala | Jolly Abraham | |
| 1979 | Agniparvatham | "Kudumbam Snehathin" | Pukazhenthi | Sreekumaran Thampi | P. Jayachandran | |
| 1979 | Agniparvatham | "Makarakkoythu" | Pukazhenthi | Sreekumaran Thampi | Solo | |
| 1979 | Ivide Kattinu Sugandam | "Neelaaranyam Poonthukil" | K. J. Joy | Bichu Thirumala | K. J. Yesudas | |
| 1979 | Iniyethra Sandhyakal | "Thaalam Thakathaalam" | G. Devarajan | Mankombu Gopalakrishnan | P. Jayachandran, C. O. Anto, Karthikeyan | |
| 1979 | Iniyathra | "Eeranudukkum Yuvathi" | Shyam | Poovachal Khader | Karthikeyan | |
| 1979 | Kathirmandapam | "Ee Gaanathil" | V. Dakshinamoorthy | Sreekumaran Thampi | K. J. Yesudas | |
| 1979 | Pennorumbettaal | "Paattukettavarum" | Shankar Ganesh | Sreekumaran Thampi | Solo | |
| 1979 | Jeevitham Oru Gaanam | "Marakkaanaavilla Naalu" | M. S. Viswanathan | Sreekumaran Thampi | K. J. Yesudas | |
| 1979 | Jeevitham Oru Gaanam | "Septemberil Pootha" | M. S. Viswanathan | Sreekumaran Thampi | Solo | |
| 1979 | Lilly Pookkal | "Theeyerinnoru" | Kottayam Joy | Poovachal Khader | Solo | |
| 1979 | Sandhya Raagam | "Pandava Vamshajanabhimanyu" | K. Raghavan | P. Bhaskaran | Solo | |
| 1979 | Iniyum Kaanaam | "Neelapoykayil" | M. S. Viswanathan | Chirayinkeezhu Ramakrishnan Nair | Solo | |
| 1979 | Rajaveedhi | "Khajurahoyile" | A. T. Ummer | Bichu Thirumala | Rajkumar | |
| 1979 | Rajaveedhi | "Somavadane Shobhane" | A. T. Ummer | Bichu Thirumala | K. J. Yesudas | |
| 1979 | Aavesham | "Mangalamuhoortham" | A. T. Ummer | Bichu Thirumala | Solo | |
| 1979 | Prabhaathasandhya | "Aramani Kingini" | Shyam | Sreekumaran Thampi | P. Jayachandran | |
| 1979 | Prabhaathasandhya | "Kalaakairali" | Shyam | Sreekumaran Thampi | Solo | |
| 1979 | Pushyaraagam | "Madhuramadhuramoru" | A. T. Ummer | Cheramangalam | Solo | |
| 1979 | Ishtapraaneshwari | "Neeraazhiyum Poomaanavum" | Shyam | Bichu Thirumala | P. Jayachandran, S. P. Balasubrahmanyam | |
| 1979 | Ishtapraaneshwari | "Poovum Neerum" | Shyam | Bichu Thirumala | P. Jayachandran | |
| 1979 | Kallu Karthyayani | "Madhuvidhuraavukalen" | A. T. Ummer | Mankombu Gopalakrishnan | Solo | |
| 1979 | Thuramukham | "Oru Premalekhanam" | M. K. Arjunan | Poovachal Khader | Solo | |

=== 1980s ===
| Year | Film | Song | Music director | Writer | Co-singer | Ref |
|---|---|---|---|---|---|---|
| 1980 | Air Hostess | "Onnanaam Kunninmel" | Salil Chowdhury | O. N. V. Kurup | K. J. Yesudas | |
| 1980 | Air Hostess | "Unaroo Unaroo Ushaadevate" | Salil Chowdhury | O. N. V. Kurup | K. J. Yesudas | |
| 1980 | Chora Chuvanna Chora | "Shishirapournami Veenurangi" | G. Devarajan | Mullanezhi | Solo | |
| 1980 | Adhikaram | "Aathiraappoonkurunninu" | A. T. Ummer | Sathyan Anthikkad | Solo | |
| 1980 | Adhikaram | "Vaasanthadevatha" | A. T. Ummer | Sathyan Anthikkad | Solo | |
| 1980 | Aarohanam | "Madhuram Madhuram Malarin" | Shyam | Poovachal Khader | K. J. Yesudas | |
| 1980 | Shalini Ente Koottukari | "Kannukal Kannukal" | G. Devarajan | M. D. Rajendran | P. Jayachandran | |
| 1980 | Daaliya Pookkal | "Rajanigandhikal Vidarum" | Kanchangad Ramachandran | K. K. Venugopal | Solo | |
| 1980 | Angadi | "Onavillin Thaalavum" | Shyam | Bichu Thirumala | Solo | |
| 1980 | Kaavalmaadam | "Vayanaadan Kulirinte" | A. T. Ummer | Sathyan Anthikkad | S. Janaki | |
| 1980 | Chandra Bimbam | "Advaithaamrithavarshini" | Shankar Ganesh | Ravi Vilangan | Solo | |
| 1980 | Theenalangal | "Pookkurunji" | M. K. Arjunan | Pappanamkodu Lakshmanan | Solo | |
| 1980 | Maro Charitra | "Vidhi Kattu Neelakandu" | M. S. Viswanathan | Mankombu Gopalakrishnan | Solo | |
| 1980 | Ambalavilakku | "Manjappattu Njorinju" | V. Dakshinamoorthy | Sreekumaran Thampi | Solo | |
| 1980 | Ambalavilakku | "Pakal Swapnathin Pavanurukkum" | V. Dakshinamoorthy | Sreekumaran Thampi | K. J. Yesudas | |
| 1980 | Akalangalil Abhayam | "Thiruvaikkathappa" | G. Devarajan | R. K. Damodaran | Solo | |
| 1980 | Idi Muzhakkam | "Amme Maayamaye" | Shyam | Sreekumaran Thampi | Solo | |
| 1980 | Thirayum Theeravum | "Leelaathilakam Nananju" | G. Devarajan | Yusufali Kechery | K. J. Yesudas | |
| 1980 | Thirayum Theeravum | "Thedum Mizhikale" | G. Devarajan | Yusufali Kechery | Solo | |
| 1980 | Kaantha Valayam | "Ee Nimisham" | Shyam | Ettumanoor Somadasan | K. J. Yesudas | |
| 1980 | Thaliritta Kinakkal | "Aa Churam Ee Churam" | Jithin Shyam | Jamal Kochangadi | K. J. Yesudas | |
| 1980 | Ithile Vannavar | "Pancharathna" | Shyam | Sathyan Anthikkad | Solo | |
| 1980 | Ithile Vannavar | "Varumo Malarvanikalil" | Shyam | Sathyan Anthikkad | Solo | |
| 1980 | Aniyaatha Valakal | "Padinjaaru Chaayunna" | A. T. Ummer | Bichu Thirumala | K. J. Yesudas | |
| 1980 | Puzha | "Kizhakkonnu Thuduthal" | M. K. Arjunan | P. Bhaskaran | Solo | |
| 1980 | Puzha | "Thappo Thappo" | M. K. Arjunan | P. Bhaskaran | Solo | |
| 1980 | Bhaktha Hanuman | "Aananda Nandanam" | V. Dakshinamoorthy | Sreekumaran Thampi | P. Susheela | |
| 1980 | Vedikkettu | "Paalaruvikkarayile" | M. K. Arjunan | P. Bhaskaran | Solo | |
| 1980 | Swandam Enna Padam | "Koonaamkuttiye Chakkarakkuttiye" | Shyam | Sreekumaran Thampi | K. J. Yesudas | |
| 1980 | Swandam Enna Padam | "Nirangalil Neeraadunna Bhoomi" | Shyam | Sreekumaran Thampi | P. Jayachandran | |
| 1980 | Pralayam | "Aathmaavin Sumangal" | A. T. Ummer | Sathyan Anthikkad | Solo | |
| 1980 | Shishirathil Oru Vasantham | "Sandhyapole Kunkumam" | Shyam | Poovachal Khader | Solo | |
| 1980 | Raagam Thaanam Pallavi | "Nukaraatha Poovo" | M. K. Arjunan | A. P. Gopalan | K. J. Yesudas | |
| 1980 | Oormakale Vida Tharu | "Doore Neelavaanam" | K. J. Joy | Dr. Pavithran | Jolly Abraham | |
| 1980 | Pappu | "Poo Poo Uthappoo" | K. J. Joy | Bichu Thirumala | Solo | |
| 1980 | Pappu | "Pushyaraagam Nrithamaadum" | K. J. Joy | Bichu Thirumala | P. Jayachandran | |
| 1980 | Muthuchippikal | "Muthukilungum Cheppaanada" | K. J. Joy | A. P. Gopalan | K. J. Yesudas | |
| 1980 | Anthappuram | "Maanya Maha Janangale" | Shankar Ganesh | Mankombu Gopalakrishnan | Solo | |
| 1980 | Deepam | "Ee Raagadeepam" | Shyam | Sathyan Anthikkad | Solo | |
| 1980 | Deepam | "Pavizhavum Muthum" | Shyam | Sathyan Anthikkad | Solo | |
| 1980 | Theeram Thedunnavar | "Indriyangalkkunmaadam" | M. S. Viswanathan | Sathyan Anthikkad | Solo | |
| 1980 | Naayattu | "Kannilkkannil Nokkiyirikkam" | Shyam | Sreekumaran Thampi | P. Jayachandran | |
| 1980 | Vaiki Vanna Vasantham | "Kaalindi Vilichaal" | Shyam | Sreekumaran Thampi | Solo | |
| 1980 | Vaiki Vanna Vasantham | "Oru Poovirinju" | Shyam | Sreekumaran Thampi | Solo | |
| 1980 | Vaiki Vanna Vasantham | "Vaasanayude Theril" | Shyam | Sreekumaran Thampi | K. J. Yesudas | |
| 1980 | Ival Eevazhi Ithu Vare | "Ushassinte" | Shankar Ganesh | Mankombu Gopalakrishnan | Solo | |
| 1980 | Sathyam | "Raajavu Naadu Neengi" | A. T. Ummer | Bichu Thirumala | Solo | |
| 1980 | Seetha | "Ammayum Makalum" | M. K. Arjunan | Sreekumaran Thampi | Solo | |
| 1980 | Arangum Aniyarayum | "Ilam Thennalo Pularithan" | A. T. Ummer | Sathyan Anthikkad | Solo | |
| 1980 | Manjil Virinja Pookkal | "Manjadi Kunnil" | Jerry Amaldev | Bichu Thirumala | K. J. Yesudas | |
| 1980 | Manjil Virinja Pookkal | "Manjadi Kunnil Revival" | Jerry Amaldev | Bichu Thirumala | K. J. Yesudas | |
| 1980 | Manjil Virinja Pookkal | "Manjani Kombil" | Jerry Amaldev | Bichu Thirumala | K. J. Yesudas | |
| 1980 | Sankarabharanam | "Brochevarevarura" | K. V. Mahadevan | Mysore Vasudevachar | S. P. Balasubrahmanyam | |
| 1980 | Sankarabharanam | "Dorakunaa Ituvanti Seva" | K. V. Mahadevan | Veturi | S. P. Balasubrahmanyam | |
| 1980 | Sankarabharanam | "Manasa Sancharare" | K. V. Mahadevan | Sadasiva Brahmendra | S. P. Balasubrahmanyam | |
| 1980 | Sankarabharanam | "Paluke Bangaaramaayena" | K. V. Mahadevan | Bhadrachala Ramadasu | Solo | |
| 1980 | Sankarabharanam | "Ey Theeruga Nanu" | K. V. Mahadevan | Bhadrachala Ramadasu | Solo | |
| 1981 | Ariyappedatha Rahasyam | "Kaanana Poykayil" | M. K. Arjunan | P. Bhaskaran | K. J. Yesudas | |
| 1981 | Arayannam | "Alakaapuriyile" | Pukazhenthi | P. Bhaskaran | Solo | |
| 1981 | Thadavara | "Aananda Raagamezhuthiya" | A. T. Ummer | Sathyan Anthikkad | Solo | |
| 1981 | Thadavara | "Nee Maayalle" | A. T. Ummer | Sathyan Anthikkad | Solo | |
| 1981 | Greeshma Jwala | "Vithuvithachathe" | A. T. Ummer | Poovachal Khader | Solo | |
| 1981 | Kolilakkam | "Omal Kalaalaya" | M. S. Viswanathan | Bichu Thirumala | Jolly Abraham | |
| 1981 | Sanchari | "Kamaneeya Malarmeni" | K. J. Yesudas | Yusufali Kechery | P. Susheela, B. Vasantha | |
| 1981 | Pinneyum Pookkunna Kaadu | "Paadaatha Gaanam" | Shyam | Poovachal Khader | Solo | |
| 1981 | Arikkari Ammu | "Pavunangee Kalamorungee" | V. Dakshinamoorthy | Sreekumaran Thampi | P. Jayachandran | |
| 1981 | Danda Gopuram | "Etho Gaanam Pole" | Shyam | Sathyan Anthikkad | P. Jayachandran | |
| 1981 | Ira Thedunna Manushyar | "Sugandha Sheethala" | G. Devarajan | Bichu Thirumala | Solo | |
| 1981 | Sphodanam | "Valakilukkam Kelkkanallo" | Shankar Ganesh | O. N. V. Kurup | P. Jayachandran, B. Vasantha, Jolly Abraham | |
| 1981 | Kaattu Kallan | "Sringaaram" | A. T. Ummer | Mankombu Gopalakrishnan | Solo | |
| 1981 | Ellaam Ninakku Vendi | "Annante Hridayamallo" | V. Dakshinamoorthy | Sreekumaran Thampi | Solo | |
| 1981 | Veliyattam | "Karangal Korthu Pidikkuka" | M. K. Arjunan | Poovachal Khader | Solo | |
| 1981 | Kilungaatha Changalakal | "Sukham Inakalil" | A. T. Ummer | Chirayinkeezhu Ramakrishnan Nair | Solo | |
| 1981 | Paathira Sooryan | "Ilam Manjin" | V. Dakshinamoorthy | Sreekumaran Thampi | Solo | |
| 1981 | Sneham Oru Pravaaham | "Manikkinaakkal" | K. J. Joy | Dr. Shahjahan | Solo | |
| 1981 | Saahasam | "Poomizhiyinakalil Pushpasarangal" | Shankar Ganesh | Pappanamkodu Lakshmanan | Ambili | |
| 1981 | Sankharsham | "Thoomanjil" | Shankar Ganesh | Bichu Thirumala | K. J. Yesudas | |
| 1981 | Munnettam | "Valakilukkam Oru Valakilukkam" | Shyam | Sreekumaran Thampi | Unni Menon | |
| 1981 | Garjanam | "Pennin Kannil Viriyum" | Ilaiyaraaja | Sreekumaran Thampi | Solo | |
| 1981 | Dhanya | "Noopurametho Kadha Paranju" | Jerry Amaldev | Yusufali Kechery | Solo | |
| 1981 | Dhanya | "Konchum Chilanke" | Jerry Amaldev | Yusufali Kechery | K. J. Yesudas | |
| 1981 | Prema Geethangal | "Muthum Mudipponnum" | Johnson | Devadas | K. J. Yesudas | |
| 1981 | Raktham | "Ayyapantamma Neyyapam Chuttu" | Johnson | R. K. Damodaran | K. J. Yesudas | |
| 1981 | Raktham | "Manjil Chekkerum" | Johnson | R. K. Damodaran | K. J. Yesudas | |
| 1981 | Enne Snehikkoo Enne Maathram | "Lillippoo Choodi Varum" | K. V. Mahadevan | Yusufali Kechery | Solo | |
| 1981 | Parvathy | "Kurunirayo" | Johnson | M. D. Rajendran | P. Jayachandran | |
| 1981 | Parvathy | "Nanda Suthaavara" | Johnson | M. D. Rajendran | Solo | |
| 1981 | Parvathy | "Thakadimdimi" | Johnson | M. D. Rajendran | Solo | |
| 1981 | Guha | "Thodu Thodu" | Shankar Ganesh | Mankombu Gopalakrishnan | Solo | |
| 1981 | Archana Teacher | "Pookkula Choodiya" | Shyam | Sreekumaran Thampi | Solo | |
| 1981 | Poocha Sanyasi | "Ivanoru Sanyasi" | K. J. Yesudas | Mankombu Gopalakrishnan | Sujatha Mohan, S. P. Sailaja, Ambili | |
| 1981 | Karimpoocha | "Aparichitha" | K. J. Joy | Poovachal Khader | Solo | |
| 1981 | Visham | "Nirangal Ezhu Nirangal" | Raghu Kumar | Poovachal Khader | S. Janaki | |
| 1981 | Visham | "Swapnam Kaanum Praayam" | Raghu Kumar | Poovachal Khader | S. Janaki | |
| 1981 | Aambal Poovu | "Poochakurinji" | V. Dakshinamoorthy | Kavalam Narayana Panicker | Solo | |
| 1981 | Nizhal Yudham | "Laasyam Swapnalaasyam" | K. J. Joy | Devadas | Solo | |
| 1981 | Nizhal Yudham | "Madhu Mozhiyo" | K. J. Joy | Pappanamkodu Lakshmanan | S. P. Balasubrahmanyam | |
| 1981 | Randu Mukhangal | "Amme Naraayana" | M. K. Arjunan | Appan Thachethu | Solo | |
| 1981 | Randu Mukhangal | "Aakaasha Poyka" | M. K. Arjunan | Appan Thachethu | Solo | |
| 1982 | Thuranna Jail | "Shaaleena Bhaavathil" | Johnson | Poovachal Khader | P. Jayachandran | |
| 1982 | Kelkkaatha Sabdham | "Naanam Ninn Kannil" | Johnson | Devadas | P. Jayachandran | |
| 1982 | Chilanthivala | "Engum Santhosham" | Guna Singh | Poovachal Khader | Solo | |
| 1982 | Chilanthivala | "Good Morning" | Guna Singh | Poovachal Khader | P. Jayachandran | |
| 1982 | Chilanthivala | "Sindhoorappottukal Thottu" | Guna Singh | Poovachal Khader | Solo | |
| 1982 | Ponnum Poovum | "Thiruvullakkaavilinnu" | K. Raghavan | P. Bhaskaran | Solo | |
| 1982 | Kazhumaram | "Muthuppanthal Mullappanthal" | Shankar Ganesh | Bichu Thirumala | P. Jayachandran | |
| 1982 | Ethiraalikal | "Venalkkinaavukale" | A. T. Ummer | Chirayinkeezhu Ramakrishnan Nair | Solo | |
| 1982 | Gaanam | "Aarodu Cholvene" | V. Dakshinamoorthy | Sreekumaran Thampi | K. J. Yesudas | |
| 1982 | Gaanam | "Karuna Cheyvaanenthu Thaamasam" | V. Dakshinamoorthy | Irayimman Thampi | | |
| 1982 | Kaalam | "Puzhayoram Kuyil Paadi" | Shankar Ganesh | Bichu Thirumala | P. Jayachandran | |
| 1982 | Kilukilukkam | "Priyatharamaakum Oru Nadham" | Johnson | O. N. V. Kurup | Solo | |
| 1982 | Komaram | "Aamala Keri" | Kottayam Joy | Trichur Biju | Solo | |
| 1982 | Aranjaanam | "Maasam Madhavamaasam" | K. J. Joy | P. Bhaskaran | P. Jayachandran | |
| 1982 | Koritharicha Naal | "Pachilakaadinnarikil" | M. K. Arjunan | Chirayinkeezhu Ramakrishnan Nair | Solo | |
| 1982 | Palangal | "Etho Janma Kalpanayil" | Johnson | Poovachal Khader | Unni Menon | |
| 1982 | Palangal | "Pookondu Poo Moodi" | Johnson | Poovachal Khader | K. J. Yesudas | |
| 1982 | Oru Thira Pinneyum Thira | "Muthiyamman Kovilile" | Shyam | Bichu Thirumala | Solo | |
| 1982 | Saravarsham | "Oru Raaga Nimishathin" | Shyam | Poovachal Khader | Solo | |
| 1982 | Ponmudy | "Vidaruvaan Vithumbumee" | Jithin Shyam | Balu Kiriyath | Solo | |
| 1982 | Kaaliya Mardhanam | "Madam Kollum" | K. J. Joy | Pappanamkodu Lakshmanan | Solo | |
| 1982 | Enthino Pookunna Pookkal | "Vinnil Ninnum Vannirangum" | Shyam | Poovachal Khader | Solo | |
| 1982 | Karthavyam | "Neerada Hamsam" | Satyam | R. K. Damodaran | K. J. Yesudas | |
| 1982 | Karthavyam | "Oru Naal" | Satyam | R. K. Damodaran | Solo | |
| 1982 | Karthavyam | "Poove Kannippoove" | Satyam | R. K. Damodaran | Solo | |
| 1982 | Paanjajanyam | "Aalekkandaal Paavam" | Shankar Ganesh | Mankombu Gopalakrishnan | P. Jayachandran, Renuka | |
| 1982 | Padayottam | "Nirathil Oro Karukkal" | Guna Singh | Kavalam Narayana Panicker | Solo | |
| 1982 | Padayottam | "Thaatheyyathom" | Guna Singh | Kavalam Narayana Panicker | Solo | |
| 1982 | Aarambham | "Aarambham Madhu Paathrangalil" | K. J. Joy | Poovachal Khader | Solo | |
| 1982 | Preeyasakhi Radha | "Sindhooram Pooshi" | V. Dakshinamoorthy | Sreekumaran Thampi | Solo | |
| 1982 | John Jaffer Janardhanan | "Vidarnnu Thozhukal" | Shyam | Sreekumaran Thampi | K. J. Yesudas, P. Jayachandran, P. Susheela, Unni Menon, Kalyani Menon | |
| 1982 | Amrutha Geetham | "Paadum Nisayithil" | G. Devarajan | G. K. Pallath | Solo | |
| 1982 | Aakrosham | "Ee Mukham" | Ben Surendar | Sreekumaran Thampi | P. Jayachandran | |
| 1982 | Ormakkayi | "Mounam Ponmanithamburu Meetti" | Johnson | Madhu Alappuzha | Solo | |
| 1982 | Enikkum Oru Divasam | "Guruviney Thedi" | Shyam | Sreekumaran Thampi | P. Susheela | |
| 1982 | Pooviriyum Pulari | "Kandu Ninne Sundarippenne" | Jerry Amaldev | Poovachal Khader | P. Jayachandran | |
| 1982 | Pooviriyum Pulari | "Premathin Maniveenayil" | Jerry Amaldev | Poovachal Khader | P. Jayachandran | |
| 1982 | Pooviriyum Pulari | "Mullappanthal Pooppanthal" | Jerry Amaldev | Poovachal Khader | Solo | |
| 1982 | Pooviriyum Pulari | "Manathaaril Mevunna" | Jerry Amaldev | Poovachal Khader | Solo | |
| 1982 | Kurukkante Kalyanam | "Manavaattippennorungi" | Zero Babu | Sathyan Anthikkad | Solo | |
| 1982 | Sooryan | "Ithiri Ithiri" | Johnson | Kavalam Narayana Panicker | Solo | |
| 1982 | Sooryan | "Ullilppookkum Poonchola" | Johnson | Kavalam Narayana Panicker | P. Jayachandran | |
| 1982 | Njan Onnu Parayatte | "Kannathalir" | K. Raghavan | Mullanezhi | Solo | |
| 1982 | Njan Onnu Parayatte | "Chingathiruvonathinu" | K. Raghavan | Mullanezhi | Solo | |
| 1982 | Aa Divasam | "Pottichirikkunna" | Shyam | Chunakkara Ramankutty | K. J. Yesudas | |
| 1982 | Velicham Vitharunna Penkutty | "Guruvayoor Keshavante" | Shyam | Mankombu Gopalakrishnan | Solo | |
| 1982 | Anuraagakkodathi | "Harasankara Sivasankara" | A. T. Ummer | Mankombu Gopalakrishnan | P. Susheela | |
| 1982 | Irattimadhuram | "Madhuram Madhuram" | Shyam | Sreekumaran Thampi | P. Jayachandran | |
| 1982 | Irattimadhuram | "Oru Kudukka Ponnutharaam" | Shyam | Sreekumaran Thampi | P. Susheela | |
| 1982 | Irattimadhuram | "Vandi Vandi Vandi" | Shyam | Sreekumaran Thampi | P. Jayachandran, Jolly Abraham, Sujatha Mohan | |
| 1982 | Shaari Alla Sharadha | "Aayiraathri Pookkum" | Shyam | Mankombu Gopalakrishnan | K. J. Yesudas | |
| 1982 | Shaari Alla Sharadha | "Neelambarathile" | Shyam | Mankombu Gopalakrishnan | Solo | |
| 1982 | Shaari Alla Sharadha | "Swargathilekkulla" | Shyam | Mankombu Gopalakrishnan | Solo | |
| 1983 | Bhookambam | "Alanjori Choodum" | Shankar Ganesh | Bichu Thirumala | P. Jayachandran | |
| 1983 | Bhookambam | "Bhookambam Manassil" | Shankar Ganesh | Bichu Thirumala | Solo | |
| 1983 | Hello Madras Girl | "Nirvrithi Yaamini" | Gangai Amaran | Poovachal Khader | Solo | |
| 1983 | Enne Njan Thedunnu | "Pularikal Paravakal" | A. T. Ummer | Bichu Thirumala | P. Jayachandran | |
| 1983 | Kuyiline Thedi | "Neelavaanam Poothirunnu" | Shyam | Chunakkara Ramankutty | K. J. Yesudas | |
| 1983 | Thaalam Thettiya Tharattu | "Sa Ga Ma Pa Ni Sa" | Raveendran | R. K. Damodaran | K. J. Yesudas | |
| 1983 | Guru Dakshina | "Nilaavulla Raavil" | K. J. Joy | Poovachal Khader | Solo | |
| 1983 | Chakravalam Chuvannappol | "Panineer Thalikkunna" | M. K. Arjunan | Chirayinkeezhu Ramakrishnan Nair | Solo | |
| 1983 | Chakravalam Chuvannappol | "Thaamarappoykaye" | M. K. Arjunan | Chirayinkeezhu Ramakrishnan Nair | K. J. Yesudas | |
| 1983 | Surumaitta Kannukal | "Aathiraappattinte" | K. Raghavan | P. Bhaskaran | P. Madhuri | |
| 1983 | Angam | "Sharathkaalankal Ithal Choodunnatho" | Shankar Ganesh | Pappanamkodu Lakshmanan | P. Jayachandran | |
| 1983 | Aadhipathyam | "Urangaatha Raavukal" | Shyam | Sreekumaran Thampi | P. Jayachandran | |
| 1983 | Anantham Ajnatham | "Orithal Vidarnnal" | M. K. Arjunan | M. N. Thankappan | Solo | |
| 1983 | Prathijnja | "Yaamini Nin Chodi" | Ben Surendar | R. K. Damodaran | Solo | |
| 1983 | Ahangaaram | "Chilankakale Kadha Parayu" | Maharaja | Bichu Thirumala | Solo | |
