= Love in Singapore =

Love In Singapore may refer to:

- Love in Singapore (1980 Malayalam film), an Indian Malayalam film
- Love in Singapore (1980 Telugu film), an Indian Telugu film
- Love in Singapore (2009 film), an Indian Malayalam film
