= Samrambham =

- Directed by: Baby
- Written by: [K. A. Narayan ]
- Screenplay by: Pappanamcode Lakshmanan
- Produced by: Thiruppathi Chettiyar
- Starring: Madhu; Balan K. Nair; Sunanda; Shankar; Anuradha
- Cinematography: S. Kumar
- Music by: K. J. Joy
- Production company: Evershine Productions
- Distributed by: Evershine Productions
- Release date: 29 July 1983
- Country: India
- Language: Malayalam

Samrambham is a 1983 Indian Malayalam film, directed by Baby and produced by Thiruppathi Chettiyar. The film stars Madhu, Balan.K.Nair, Sunanda, Shankar and Anuradha in the lead roles. The film has musical score by K. J. Joy. The movie is the remake of the 1972 Hindi film Victoria No. 203.

== Cast ==
- Madhu as Vasu
- Sunanda Rani
- Shankar as Raghu
- Anuradha
- Balan K. Nair as Raghavan
- Janardhanan as Johny
- Jose Prakash Mahendran
- Bheeman Raghu as Rafi
- C.I Paul
- TG Ravi
- Manavalan Joseph
- Vallathol Unnikrishnan
- Prathap Chandran
- Nellikode Bhaskaran

== Soundtrack ==
The music was composed by K. J. Joy and the lyrics were written by Poovachal Khader, Pappanamkodu Lakshmanan.

| No. | Song | Singers | Lyrics | Length (m:ss) |
|---|---|---|---|---|
| 1 | "Chaavi Puthiya Chaavi" | P. Jayachandran | Poovachal Khader, Pappanamkodu Lakshmanan | |
| 2 | "Poovum Poomukilum" | P. Jayachandran, Vani Jairam | Poovachal Khader, Pappanamkodu Lakshmanan | |
