= Kurishuyudham =

1984 film directed by Baby

- Poster
- Directed by: Baby
- Screenplay by: Pappanamkodu Lakshmanan
- Story by: Pushparajan
- Produced by: C. Radhamani
- Starring: Prem Nazir; Madhu; Srividya; Mohanlal
- Cinematography: K. B. Dayalan
- Edited by: G. Murali
- Music by: K. J. Joy
- Production company: Pushpa Movie Productions
- Distributed by: Soori Release
- Release date: 8 October 1984
- Country: India
- Language: Malayalam

Kurishuyudham (transl. Crusade) is a 1984 Indian Malayalam-language horror film directed by Baby and written by Pappanamkodu Lakshmanan from a story by Pushparajan. The film stars Prem Nazir, Madhu, Srividya and Mohanlal in the lead roles. The film has musical score by K. J. Joy.

== Cast ==
- Prem Nazir as James
- Madhu as Matthew Cheriyachan
- Srividya as Rosamma
- Mohanlal as Jerry
- Madhavi as Susie, Daisy (double role)
- T. G. Ravi as Issac John
- C. I. Paul as Paili
- Jose Prakash as Father Bernard
- Kollam G. K. Pilla as Paappi
- Prathapachandran as Doctor Charles
- Jagannatha Varma as D.I.G. Sajan Varghese
- Captain Raju as Magician d'Souza/Lawrence
- Anuradha as dancer
- Santhakumari as Annamma
- Santhosh as Simon

== Soundtrack ==
The music was composed by K. J. Joy and the lyrics were written by Poovachal Khader.

| No. | Song | Singers | Length (m:ss) |
|---|---|---|---|
| 1 | "Bhoomiyil Poomazhayaayi" | K. J. Yesudas | |
| 2 | "Koodaaram Vediyumee" | K. J. Yesudas | |
| 3 | "Yudham Kurisuyudham" | K. J. Yesudas | |
