= Ithaanente Vazhi =

- Directed by: M. Krishnan Nair
- Written by: Mani Muhammed (dialogues)
- Screenplay by: Mani Muhammed
- Produced by: Sharada
- Starring: Madhu; Sharada; Jose Prakash; Sreemoolanagaram Vijayan
- Cinematography: Vipin Das
- Edited by: G. Venkittaraman
- Music by: K. J. Joy; Lyrics: Bichu Thirumala
- Production company: Parimala Pictures
- Distributed by: Parimala Pictures
- Release date: 11 August 1978
- Country: India
- Language: Malayalam

Ithaanente Vazhi is a 1978 Indian Malayalam film, directed by M. Krishnan Nair and produced by Sharada. The film stars Madhu, Sharada, Jose Prakash and Sreemoolanagaram Vijayan in the lead roles. The film has musical score by K. J. Joy. The film was a remake of the 1972 Telugu film Manavudu Danavudu.

== Cast ==
- Madhu as Vijayan / Karimpuli Bhargavan (Dual role)
- Sharada as Malathi
- Jose Prakash as Menon
- Sreemoolanagaram Vijayan as Vasu
- Bahadoor as Gopi
- Jayamalini
- Manimala as Seetha
- Philomina as Beevi Umma
- Sadhana
- Vijayalalitha as Sarasa
- TP Madhavan as police inspector
- Sam
- Lissy

== Soundtrack ==
The music was composed by K. J. Joy and the lyrics were written by Bichu Thirumala.

No.	Song	Singers	Length (m:ss)
1	"Manideepanalam"	S. Janaki	
2	"Mele Neelaakasham"	S. Janaki	
3	"Sadaachaaram Sadaachaaram"	P. Jayachandran, Chorus	
4	"Somarasa Shaalakal"	S. Janaki, P. Jayachandran	
