= Adima Changala =

- Directed by: A. B. Raj
- Written by: V. P. Sarathy
- Produced by: R. S. Sreenivasan
- Starring: Prem Nazir; Sheela; Swapna; Dr.Vishnuvardhan
- Music by: M. K. Arjunan A.R Rahman's First movie as a keyboard player
- Production company: Sree Sai Productions
- Distributed by: Sree Sai Productions
- Release date: 8 October 1981
- Running time: 135 minute
- Country: India
- Language: Malayalam

Adima Changala is a 1981 Indian Malayalam-language action-adventure film, directed by A. B. Raj and produced by R. S. Sreenivasan. The film stars Prem Nazir, Sheela, Swapna and Vishnuvardhan (in his Malayalam debut) in the lead roles. The film has musical score by M. K. Arjunan. It is a remake of the 1969 Italian zapata spaghetti Western film The Five Man Army. The train sequence in the movie is an excellently shot scene, especially for the '80s.

== Cast ==
- Prem Nazir
- Sheela
- Swapna
- Vishnuvardhan
- Cochin Hannefa
- Jose Prakash
- Balan K. Nair
- Jayamalini

== Soundtrack ==
The music was composed by M. K. Arjunan and the lyrics were written by R. K. Damodaran.

No.	Song	Singers	Lyrics	Length (m:ss)
1	"Eranaadin"	K. J. Yesudas, Chorus	R. K. Damodaran	
2	"Habbi Rabbi Salalla"	K. J. Yesudas, Chorus	R. K. Damodaran	
3	"Kaayal Naabhi"	S. Janaki	R. K. Damodaran	
4	"Madarajani"	S. Janaki	R. K. Damodaran	
