= Lisa (1978 film) =

- Directed by: Baby
- Screenplay by: Vijayan
- Story by: Baby
- Produced by: Raghu Kumar; Murali
- Starring: Prem Nazir; Jayan; Ravikumar; Jose Prakash; Premji; Vidhubala; Kanakadurga; Seema; M. G. Soman; Jayabharathi; Kuthiravattom Pappu
- Cinematography: P. S. Nivas
- Edited by: K. Sankunni
- Music by: K. J. Joy
- Production company: Dhanya Productions
- Distributed by: Evershine Release
- Release date: 8 December 1978
- Country: India
- Language: Malayalam

Lisa is a 1978 Indian Malayalam-language horror film directed by Baby (A. G. Baby) and produced by Dhanya Productions. Considered one of the best horror and musical flicks in Malayalam, with music by K. J. Joy. It was remade as Woh Phir Aayegi in Hindi in 1988. The film was a major commercial success, running for 100 days in theatres.

== Plot ==
Lakshmi, a village girl, takes up a job in a nearby city. A meek, shy girl new to the city, she stays at a women's hostel and befriends Kala and other hostel mates.

Soon, a dark entity with a past takes over Lakshmi and she starts behaving very strangely. From a shy girl, she completely transforms into an extroverted personality. As she starts taking part in music, arts and dance, which she had no interest in earlier, Kala and her close people worry for Lakshmi. During this time, two people are killed mysteriously; the hostel's former warden and a friend of Lakshmi's boss. As events progress further, Lakshmi behaves very erratically with supernatural elements seemingly taking over.

An exorcist is called for and it is revealed that the entity that possessed Lakshmi was none other than Lisa, Kala's former roommate and best friend. The people who were killed were the cause of Lisa's death and she returned to avenge those who ruined her life. With her mission complete, she leaves Lakshmi's body and in the end, Lakshmi reunites with her family, fiance and her friends.

== Cast ==
- Prem Nazir as Murali
- Bhavani as P. Lakshmi
- Seema as Lisa
- Jayan as Suresh
- Vanchiyoor Radha
- Vidhubala as Kala
- Jayabharathi as herself (cameo)
- Jose Prakash as Joseph Chacko, colleague
- Prathapachandran as Lakshmi's father
- Philomina as Lakshmi's mother
- Kanakadurga as former hostel warden
- Kuthiravattam Pappu as Gopalan, hostel watchman
- M. G. Soman as Lakshmi's boss
- Nellikode Bhaskaran
- Premji as Bhavuthraar Namboothiripad
- Ravikumar as Johnny
- Kothuku Nanappan as Sankunni

== Soundtrack ==
The music was composed by K. J. Joy and the lyrics were written by Vijayan.

No.	Song	Singers	Length (m:ss)
1	"Inakkamo Pinakkamo"	K. J. Yesudas	
2	"Neelmizhithumbil"	P. Jayachandran	
3	"Paadum Raagathil"	P. Jayachandra	
4	"Prabhaathame"	K. J. Yesudas	
5	"Radha Geetha Govindha"	P. Susheela	

== Sequel ==
The film was very popular resulting in another film Veendum Lisa in 1987 also directed by Baby.

== See also ==
- List of Malayalam horror films
