= Agni Kshethram =

- Directed by: P. T. Rajan
- Written by: A. C. Trilokchander; C. P. Madhusoodanan (dialogues)
- Starring: Prem Nazir; Srividya; Roja Ramani; Jagathy Sreekumar
- Cinematography: Melly Dayalan
- Edited by: G. Venkittaraman
- Music by: K. J. Joy
- Production company: Deepa Films
- Distributed by: Deepa Films
- Release date: 21 March 1980
- Country: India
- Language: Malayalam

Agni Kshethram (transl. Fire Temple) is a 1980 Indian Malayalam film, directed by P. T. Rajan. The film stars Prem Nazir, Srividya, Roja Ramani and Jagathy Sreekumar in the lead roles. The film has musical score by K. J. Joy.

== Cast ==
- Prem Nazir as Dr. Suresh
- Srividya as Sreedevi
- Roja Ramani as Radha
- Jagathy Sreekumar Mandan Thoma
- Jose Prakash as Vishwanathan
- Kumarji Ponnadu
- Kainakari Thangaraj
- Kanakadurga as Nurse Shantha
- Ramadevi as Subhashini
- Thrissur Elsy as Nazir's & Shobhana's Mother
- Shobhana
- Babichan
- Kottayam Valsalan
- Raju
- Sree vijaya]
- Leela
- Valsala

== Soundtrack ==
The music was composed by K. .J Joy and the lyrics were written by Madhu Alappuzha.

No.	Song	Singers	Length (m:ss)
1	"Manjappalunkil"	P. Susheela, Chorus	
2	"Pon Kamalangalum"	S. Janaki	
3	"Thumbappoo Thaalangalil"	K. J. Yesudas, P. Susheela	
