= Onnam Prathi Olivil =

- Directed by: Baby
- Written by: Pushparaj; Pappanamkodu Lakshmanan (dialogues)
- Screenplay by: Pappanamkodu Lakshmanan
- Produced by: A. P. Lal
- Starring: Rahman; Kamini; T. G. Ravi; Shanavas
- Cinematography: K. B. Dayalan
- Edited by: G. Murali
- Music by: K. J. Joy
- Production company: Quality Productions
- Distributed by: Quality Productions
- Release date: 18 August 1985
- Country: India
- Language: Malayalam

Onnam Prathi Olivil is a 1985 Indian Malayalam-language film, directed by Baby and produced by A. P. Lal. The film stars Rahman and Kamini in the lead roles. The film has musical score by K. J. Joy.

== Cast ==
- Rahman
- Kamini
- T. G. Ravi
- Shanavas

== Soundtrack ==
The music was composed by K. J. Joy with lyrics by P. Bhaskaran.

| No. | Song | Singers | Length (m:ss) |
|---|---|---|---|
| 1 | "Cheekithirukiya" | K. J. Yesudas, K. S. Chithra | |
| 2 | "Raasalela Lahari" | K. J. Yesudas | |
| 3 | "Thenuthirum" | K. S. Chithra | |
