= Oormakale Vida Tharu =

- Directed by: Ravi Gupthan
- Starring: Srividya; Prathap Pothen
- Edited by: Ravi
- Music by: KJ Joy
- Release date: 31 October 1980
- Country: India
- Language: Malayalam

Oormakale Vida Tharu is a 1980 Indian Malayalam-language film, directed by Ravi Gupthan. The film stars Srividya and Prathap Pothen. The film has musical score by KJ Joy.

== Cast ==
- Srividya
- Prathap Pothen

== Soundtrack ==
The music was composed by KJ Joy with lyrics by Dr. Pavithran.

No.	Song	Singers	Length (m:ss)
1	"Doore Neelavaanam"	Vani Jairam, Jolly Abraham	
2	"Jeevitha Nritham"	S. Janaki	
3	"Kaarmukil"	K. J. Yesudas	
4	"Swapnangalkkarthangal Undaayirunnenkil"	K. J. Yesudas, Chorus	
