= Guru Dakshina (1983 film) =

- Film Poster
- Directed by: Baby
- Written by: Baby
- Produced by: C. M. P. Nair; Joy K. Mathai
- Starring: Adoor Bhasi; T. G. Ravi; Sathish Menon; Sunanda; Ratheesh; Mohanlal; Mammootty
- Edited by: G. Murali
- Music by: K. J. Joy
- Production company: PJ Movies
- Distributed by: Evershine Films
- Release date: 9 March 1983
- Running time: 130 minutes
- Country: India
- Language: Malayalam

Guru Dakshina is a 1983 Indian Malayalam-language family drama movie written and directed by Baby. The film stars Adoor Bhasi, T. G. Ravi, Sathish Menon and Sunanda in important roles. The film also has Mammootty, Ratheesh and Mohanlal in supporting roles. The songs of the movie were composed by K. J. Joy. The film was a remake of the Tamil film Engal Vathiyar released in 1980.

== Plot ==
Kunjunni is the school teacher in a village. His daughter Lakshmi falls in love with Ragunath who is the son of Panchayat President, Keshavan Nair. Keshavan asks for a dowry of fifty thousand to be raised in a month for the marriage to happen. Kunjunni who is in utter poverty has no way to raise this huge amount.

Kunjunni goes to see some of his old students who could help him raise this amount. He initially goes to Majeed who is presently a police inspector. He couldn't give Kunjunni more than two thousand as his wife need to undergo a surgery the next month. Kunjunni then goes to meet Prabhakaran, who is currently the Excise Minister of the State. He welcomes Kunjunni very warmly just to get more media attention. Even though he assures Kunjunni the help, he sends him back with hundred rupees.

On the way back he meets his old student John who is presently a goon. Even though he gives the amount to Kunjunni he refuses it. Kunjunni returns to the village with all hopes in vain. Without the knowledge of Kunjunni, John threatens Keshavan and forces him for this marriage without accepting any dowry. Keshavan says about his change in plans to Kunjunni. Kunjunni very happily makes all arrangements for the marriage.

Two days before the marriage, Keshavan gets information about John and gives the information to Majeed. He then goes to Kunjunni's house and says that the marriage won't happen until he raised the fifty thousand. On the day of the marriage Kunjunni asks Pappu to marry Lakshmi. Ragunath then comes there and asks forgiveness for all that his father did and said he would marry her. Knowing this Keshan too arrives there and demands for the dowry. Unbearable of all these pressure Lakshmi faints down to Nilavilakku and dies.

== Cast ==
- Adoor Bhasi as Kunjunni Mash
- Mammootty as John
- Ratheesh as Inspector Majeed
- Mohanlal as Excise Minister Prabhakaran
- T. G. Ravi as Keshavan Nair, the panchayat president
- Sathish Menon as Ragunath, Keshavan's son
- Sunanda as Lakshmi, Kunjunni's daughter
- Sukumari as Parvathy, Kunjunni's wife
- Kuthiravattam Pappu as Pappu
- Meena as Keshavan's wife
- Anuradha as Susheela
- Unni Mary as Reetha, John's wife
- C. I. Paul as Susheela's boss
- Santhakumari as the hostel warden
- Kozhikode Narayanan Nair as Madhavan (cameo appearance)

== Soundtrack ==
The music was composed by K. J. Joy and the lyrics were written by Poovachal Khader.

No.	Song	Singers	Lyrics	Length (m:ss)
1	"Nilaavulla Raavil"	Vani Jairam	Poovachal Khader	
2	"Saandeepaniyude Ashramathil"	M. S. Viswanathan	Poovachal Khader	
3	"Swarga Laavanya Shilppamo"	P. Susheela, Unni Menon	Poovachal Khader	
