= Manushyaputhran =

- Directed by: Baby; Rishi
- Written by: K. G. Sethunath
- Screenplay by: K. G. Sethunath
- Produced by: Kadakkavoor Thankappan
- Starring: Madhu; Jayabharathi; Vidhubala; Vincent
- Cinematography: Ashok Kumar
- Music by: G. Devarajan
- Production company: Srushti Films International
- Distributed by: Srushti Films International
- Release date: 11 May 1973
- Country: India
- Language: Malayalam

Manushyaputhran is a 1973 Indian Malayalam film, directed by Baby and produced by Kadakkavoor Thankappan. The film stars Madhu, Jayabharathi, Vidhubala and Vincent in the lead roles. The film had musical score by G. Devarajan.

== Cast ==
- Madhu as Karthikeyan
- Jayabharathi as Madhavi
- Vidhubala as Ammu
- Vincent as Thommi
- Adoor Bhasi as Ammunni
- Muthukulam Raghavan Pillai as Vaidyar
- Prema
- T. R. Omana
- Adoor Bhavani as Madhavi's Mother
- Bahadoor as Kochu Govindan
- G. K. Pillai as Keshavan
- Khadeeja as Kaalikutty
- S. P. Pillai as Kunjandi

== Soundtrack ==
The music was composed by G. Devarajan and the lyrics were written by Vayalar Ramavarma and Gowreesapattam Sankaran Nair.

No.	Song	Singers	Lyrics	Length (m:ss)
1	"Amme Kadalamme"	P. Madhuri	Vayalar Ramavarma	
2	"Kadalinu Pathinezhu"	P. Madhuri	Gowreesapattam Sankaran Nair	
3	"Swargasaagarathil"	K. J. Yesudas	Vayalar Ramavarma	
