= Muthuchippikal =

- Directed by: Hariharan
- Written by: Hariharan; K. T. Muhammad (dialogues)
- Screenplay by: Hariharan
- Produced by: C. Das
- Starring: Madhu; Srividya; Hari; Sankaradi
- Edited by: V. P. Krishnan
- Music by: K. J. Joy
- Production company: Vasanthachithra
- Distributed by: Vasanthachithra
- Release date: 12 November 1980
- Country: India
- Language: Malayalam

Muthuchippikal is a 1980 Indian Malayalam film, directed by Hariharan and produced by C. Das. The film stars Madhu, Srividya, Hari and Sankaradi in the lead roles. The film has musical score by K. J. Joy.

== Cast ==
- Madhu
- Srividya
- Hari
- Sankaradi
- T. R. Omana
- Praveena
- C. Das
- Sathaar
- M. G. Soman
- Mala Aravindan
- Nellikode Bhaskaran
- Oduvil Unnikrishnan
- P. K. Abraham
- Paravoor Bharathan
- Bhavani

== Soundtrack ==
The music was composed by K. J. Joy and the lyrics were written by A. P. Gopalan and Muringoor Sankara Potti.

No.	Song	Singers	Lyrics	Length (m:ss)
1	"Alakayilo"	S. Janaki	A. P. Gopalan	
2	"Muthukilungum Cheppaanada"	K. J. Yesudas, Vani Jairam, Chorus	A. P. Gopalan	
3	"Nalla Mannennum"	Chorus, Jency, Jolly Abraham	A. P. Gopalan	
4	"Ranjini Ranjini"	P. Susheela, P. Jayachandran	A. P. Gopalan, Muringoor Sankara Potti	
5	"Thaalikkuruvi Thenkuruvi"	P. Jayachandran	A. P. Gopalan	
