= Jose Prakash =

Indian actor (1925–2012)

- Born: Kunnel Joseph Joseph; 14 April 1925; Kottayam, Travancore, British India
- Died: 24 March 2012 (aged 86); Kochi, Kerala, India
- Occupations: Actor; singer
- Years active: 1953–2011
- Notable work: Lisa (1978); CID Nazir (1971); John Jaffer Janardhanan (1980); Koodevide (1983); Traffic (2011)
- Spouse: Philomina joseph
- Children: 6
- Parent(s): K.J.Joseph, Eliyamma Joseph
- Relatives: Prem Prakash (brother); Bobby-Sanjay; Dennis Joseph (nephews)
- Awards: J. C. Daniel Award

Kunnel Joseph Joseph, better known by his stage name, Jose Prakash (14 April 1925 – 24 March 2012) was an Indian actor and singer who worked in Malayalam cinema. He was a singer turned actor who had appeared in more than 300 films mostly in antagonist roles. He was given the J. C. Daniel Award in 2011, a day before he died aged 86. In a career spanning around 40 years, he was known for portraying some of the iconic villain characters in the Malayalam film industry. Later, he switched to character roles in the mid-1990s.

== Personal life ==
He was born as K. J. Joseph (Jr.) on 14 April 1925 as the eldest of the eight children of Eliyamma and K. J. Joseph (Sr.) of the Kunnel house at Changanassery, Kottayam. He had four younger brothers and three sisters, among whom the youngest brother, Prem Prakash, is also an actor. Originally named after his father, he came to be known as 'Baby' among his family and friends. He had his primary education from Sacred Heart Public School, Kottayam. He was settled in Madras for around 30 years and later moved to Kochi. In 2003, his right leg had to be amputated due to Diabetes. He was married to Philomina (Chinnamma), who predeceased him in 1991. They had 6 children, 2 sons and 4 daughters: Elsamma Thomas (née Joseph), Rajan Joseph, Gracy Maliakal, Shaji Joseph, Jasmine Joseph, and Susan Joseph. He lived with his youngest son, Shaji Joseph, in Kochi till his death on 24 March 2012.

Script writers Bobby-Sanjay and Malayalam movie director Dennis Joseph are his nephews.

== Early career ==
Jose Prakash was in the Indian army before entering the film industry. While in the army he had the rare distinction to serve as the body guard of Mahatma Gandhi during the time of partition. Like other actors of that age he was not a theatre or stage artist. He had served for Indian army for 8 years. He later left army and return to his homeland and start small business. Having interest in cinema and music from childhood he started a small club with his friends called Kottayam Arts Club in which he was the lead singer. Thikkurissy Sukumaran Nair once saw his performance and called him as a singer for his debut directorial film Sheriyo Thetto. It was Thikkurissy who gave him the name Jose Prakash.

== Film career ==
=== Singer ===
Jose Prakash started his early career as a singer who lend his voice for Prem Nazir, Sathyaneshan Nadar etc. Malayalam industry was not professional at early 1950s usually actors sing for themselves. Thikkurissy Sukumaran Nair introduced him to V. Dakshinamoorthy who liked his voice and lend his voice for the film Sheriyo Thetto in 1953 directed by Thikkurissy Sukumaran Nair. In this film philosophical number "Paadu pettu paadangalil" sung by Jose Prakash introduced a new trend in Malayan cinema. He also did a small role in the movie. He was not at all a professional singer and does not attend any musical class. In the early 1960s Malayalam film industry became professional and the introduction of talented singers like A. M. Rajah, K. J. Yesudas ended the careers of all non professional singers. Up to the 1960s he had sung around 60 songs for various actors like Prem Nazir etc.

=== Actor ===
During his singing career he had done small roles and cameos for films. His first break as an actor was Bhakta Kuchela in 1961. But his major break as a villain was Olavum Theravum in 1969 and he later went on to do many films mostly in villain roles. In 1971, he acted in the first ever investigative sequel C.I.D. Nazir (1971) directed by P. Venu. Later he worked with P. Venu in many of his films. He and K. P. Ummer dominated Malayalam film industry in the role of Antagonist and was a hard target for Heroes. He acted in more than 350 films in Malayalam language and retired from film industry in 2003 for health reasons. His last film was Ente Veedu Appuvinteyum directed by Sibi Malayil. After a long gap of 8 years, he did a small cameo role in Traffic.

== Awards ==
Kerala State Television Awards

- 1993:Kerala State Television Award For Best Actor - Mikhayelinte Santhathikal
- 2006 Bahadoor Award
- 2011 J C Daniel Award

== Filmography ==
=== As an actor ===
==== 1950s ====
Year	Title	Role	Notes
1952	Premalekha		
1952	Alphonsa		
1953	Sheriyo Thetto		Debut Film as singer
1954	Manasakshi		
1954	Balyasakhi		
1955	Aniyathi	Doctor	
1955	C.I.D.	Mukunda Menon	
1955	Harishchandra	Minister Sathyakeerthi	
1956	Manthravadi	Veeravarman	
1957	Padatha Painkili	Pothachan	
1957	Deva Sundari		
1958	Mariakutty	Ponnappachan	
1959	Chathurangam		

==== 1960s ====
Year	Title	Role	Notes
1961	Bhaktha Kuchela	Nandagopan	
1963	Ammaye Kaanaan	Advocate	
1963	Snapaka Yohannan	Snapaka Yohannan	
1963	Kaattumaina		
1964	Aadyakiranangal	Damodaran	
1964	Karutha Kai	Madhava Menon	
1965	Subaidha		
1967	Agniputhri		
1968	Love in Kerala		
1968	Velutha Kathreena	Superintend Manoharan	
1969	Kumara Sambhavam	Devendran	
1969	Chattambikkavala	Man at beach	
1969	Rahasyam	Karadi Damodharan	
1969	Kannur Deluxe	Gopalakrishnan	
1969	Kattukurangu	Das	

==== 1970s ====
Year	Title	Role	Notes
1970	Olavum Theeravum	Kunjali	
1970	Aranazhika Neram	Priest	
1970	Madhuvidhu	Sathi's father	
1970	Lottery Ticket	Inspector	
1970	Abhayam	Vikraman	
1970	Nizhalattam	Bhaskaran	
1970	Nilakkatha Chalanangal		
1971	C.I.D. Nazir	Shivaram	
1971	Lankadahanam	Das	
1971	Muthassi	Unnikrishnan	
1971	Achante Bharya	Rajan	
1971	Vilakkyu Vaangiya Veena	K.R.Das	
1971	Thapaswini		
1971	Makane Ninakku Vendi	Pappachan	
1971	Jalakanyaka		
1971	Avalalppam Vaikipoyi		
1972	Prathikaram	Sreedharan Thampi	
1972	Brahmachari	Venugopal	
1972	Manthrakodi	S. R. Nair/Swamiji	
1972	Sakthi		
1972	Aaradi Manninte Janmi	Dr. Menon	
1972	Nrithasala	Dayananthan	
1972	Taxi Car	Shivaram	
1972	Anweshanam		
1972	Sambhavami Yuge Yuge	Balaram	
1972	Sree Guruvayoorappan		
1972	Pushpanjali	Damu	
1973	Thekkan Kattu	Sebastain	
1973	Raakuyil		
1973	Veendum Prabhatham	Madhu	
1973	Masappady Mathupillai		
1973	Swapnam	Viswanathan's brother	
1973	Prethangalude Thazhvara		
1973	Pacha Nottukal	Mathews Muthalali	
1973	Police Ariyaruthe	Alex	
1973	Thaniniram	Mathai/Mathew Philip	
1973	Bhadradeepam	Dr. Venugopal	
1973	Panitheeratha Veedu	Hari's father	
1973	Kaapalika	Priest	
1973	Ajnathavasam	Jayaraj	
1973	Padmavyooham	Mathachan	
1973	Panchavadi	Shekhar	
1973	Jesus	Annas	
1974	Rahasyarathri	Kurupu	
1974	Angathattu		
1974	Pattabhishekam		
1974	Poonthenaruvi	Priest	
1974	Shapamoksham		
1974	College Girl	Nanu	
1974	Honeymoon		
1974	Sapthaswaragal	Madhava Das	
1974	Pancha Thanthram	Prasad	
1975	Priye Ninakku Vendi		
1975	Sooryavamsham		
1975	Odakkuzhal		
1975	Chandanachola		
1975	Love Letter		
1975	Love Marriage	Prakash	
1975	Mattoru Seetha		
1975	Pravaham	Bhaskaran	
1975	Ullasa Yaathra		
1975	Raagam	Dr. Jayachandran	
1975	Makkal		
1975	Pulivalu		
1975	Thomasleeha		
1975	Omanakkunju		
1975	Hello Darling	Krishna Kumar	
1975	Babumon	Puli Naanu	
1975	Chumaduthangi	RK Menon	
1975	Picnic	Mooppan	
1976	Amma		
1976	Nee Ente Lahari		
1976	Chirikkudukka	Kumar	
1976	Light House	Jayaprakash	
1976	Themmadi Velappan	Balakrishnan	
1976	Amba Ambika Ambalika	Bheeshmar	
1976	Neela Sari		
1976	Rajaankanam		
1976	Ozhukkinethire		
1976	Paarijatham		
1976	Agni Pushpam		
1976	Seemantha Puthran		
1976	Udyaanalakshmi		
1977	Sakhakkale Munnoottu		
1977	Muttathe Mulla	Thampi	
1977	Sreemad Bhagavad Geetha		
1977	Abhinivesham	C. P. Menon	
1977	Santha Oru Devatha		
1977	Sukradasa		
1977	Sankhupushpam	Dr. Jose	
1977	Innale Innu	Achutha Kuruppu	
1977	Vezhambal		
1977	Sangamam		
1977	Minimol		
1977	Parivarthanam	Fr. Zacharia	
1977	Madhura Swapanam		
1977	Sujatha		
1977	Aadhya Paadam		
1977	Rajaparambara		
1977	Nirakudam	Prabhakaran	
1977	Satyavan Savithri	Ashwapathi	
1977	Aval Oru Devaalayam		
1977	Randu Lokam	Thamarasheri Gopala Kurup	
1978	Aarum Anyaralla	Priest	
1978	Urakkam Varaatha Raathrikal	Balagangadhara Menon	
1978	Ee Ganam Marakkumo	Raman Nair	
1978	Ashokavanam		
1978	Karimpuli		
1978	Aval Kanda Lokam		
1978	Padmatheertham	Achutha Kurup	
1978	Kanalkattakal	Vikraman/Prasad	
1978	Rowdy Ramu	Panchayat President Raghavan Nair	
1978	Aanakkalari		
1978	Kudumbam Namukku Sreekovil	Dharmapalan	
1978	Avakaasham		
1978	Ithaanente Vazhi	Menon	
1978	Rajan Paranja Kadha		
1978	Lisa	Joseph Chacko	
1978	Aalmaaraattam		
1978	Ithaa Oru Manushyan	Narayanan Thampi	
1978	Amarsham		
1978	Yagaswam	Vishvanathan Pilla	
1978	Velluvili	Minnal Moidu	
1978	Aval Viswasthayayirunnu	Psychiatrist	
1978	Beena		
1978	Eeta	Narayanan	
1979	Prabhu	Gauri Sankar Prasad	
1979	Peruvazhiyambalam	Paramu Nair	
1979	Vijayam Nammude Senani		
1979	Rakthamillatha Manushyan	Menon	
1979	Vaaleduthaven Vaalaal		
1979	Sarpam	Dr. Fernandez	
1979	Ward No.7		
1979	Kathirmandapam		
1979	Thuramukham	Rosario Sayipu	
1979	Indradhanussu	Rappai	
1979	Tharangam	Gopalan	
1979	Vijayanum Veeranum	Surendran Nair	
1979	Allauddinum Albhutha Vilakkum	Grand Sorcerer	
1979	Pichathy Kuttappan	Raman Muthalali	
1979	Irumbazhikal	Swami	
1979	Yakshi Paaru	Thampi	
1979	Maamaankam	Manavikraman	
1979	Avano Atho Avalo	Surendran	
1979	Puthiya Velicham	John	
1979	Agniparvatham	Kaduva Ramu	

==== 1980s ====
Year	Title	Role	Notes
1980	Aagamanam	Issac	
1980	Bhaktha Hanuman	Vibhishana	
1980	Ival Ee Vazhi Ithu Vare		
1980	Avan Oru Ahankaari		
1980	Eden Thottam		
1980	Anthappuram		
1980	Prakadanam	Damodharan	
1980	Kadalkkaattu	Vasu chettambi	
1980	Sakthi	Sreedharan	
1980	Manushya Mrugam	K. G. Menon	
1980	Agni Kshethram	Vishwanathan	
1980	Chandrahasam	Rathnakaran	
1980	Air Hostess	Menon	
1980	Love In Singapore	Rowdy Sethu	
1980	Love In Singapore		Telugu film
1981	Ariyappedatha Rahasyam	Sreedharan Thampi	
1981	Prema Geethangal	P K Panikkar	
1981	Agni Yudham		
1981	Maniyan Pilla Adhava Maniyan Pilla	Parameshwaran Pilla	
1981	Adima Changala		
1981	Swarnappakshikal		
1981	Sambhavam		
1981	Karimpoocha	Cheriyachan	
1981	Thadavara	Kollakkaran	
1981	Agnisharam		
1981	Ahimsa	R. K.	
1981	Raktham	Major Nair	
1981	Thrishna	K V S Panikkar	
1981	Aarathi	Major Prathapa Chandran	
1981	Choothattam		
1981	Nizhal Yudham	Unnithan	
1981	Kilungaatha Changalakal	Rajaram	
1981	Saahasam		
1982	Oru Vilippadakale	Dr. Cheriyan	
1982	Ithiri Neram Othiri Karyam		
1982	John Jaffer Janardhanan		
1982	Kaaliya Mardhanam	DSP Menon	
1982	Ithu Njangalude Katha	Mathachan	
1982	Shaari Alla Sharada		
1982	Dheera	Fernandez	
1982	Aasha	Mathew Cheriyan	
1982	Sharam		
1982	Paanjajanyam	Madhavan Thampi	
1982	Chilanti Vala		
1982	Dhrohi		
1982	Shila		
1982	Aranjaanam	Colonel	
1982	Aarambham	Sebastian	
1982	Raktha Sakshi		
1982	Saravarsham	Sumathi's father	
1983	Koodevide		
1983	Enne Njan Thedunnu	Doctor Earadi	
1983	Maniyara		
1983	Angam	Chacko	
1983	Kodungattu	DSP Jayadevan IPS	
1983	Belt Mathai	Alexander	
1983	Oru Mukham Pala Mukham	Rajasekharan Thampi	
1983	Ahangaaram	Rajan	
1983	Passport		
1983	Nathi Muthal Nathi Vare	Thampi	
1983	Himam	Jaykkal	
1983	Koodevide	Xavier Puthooran	
1984	Kurishuyudham	Fr. Fernandez	
1984	Shabadham	Viswanadhan Thampi	
1984	Swanthamevide Bandhamevide	Madhavan Nair	
1984	Oru Kochukatha Aarum Parayatha Katha	Advocate	
1984	Manithali		
1984	Thacholi Thankappan	Guptha	
1984	Paavam Poornima	Thampi	
1984	Jeevitham		
1984	Piriyilla Naam		
1984	Koottinilamkili	Raman Nair	
1984	Parannu Parannu Parannu	Sreekantan Nair	
1985	Nirakkoottu	M. K. Abraham	
1985	Aa Neram Alppa Dooram	Muthalali	
1985	Ee Sabdam Innathe Sabdam	MP Nandan Menon	
1985	Madhuvidhu Theerum Mumbe		
1985	Sammelanam	Ananthan Nambiar	
1985	Upaharam	Fernandez	
1985	Akkacheyude Kunjuvava		
1985	Akalathe Ambili	Kurichan	
1985	Eeran Sandhya	Krishna Menon	
1985	Ente Kaanakkuyil	Madhavan Thampi	
1986	Aayiram Kannukal	Dr. K. G. Varma	
1986	Rajavinte Makan	Chief Minister Balagopal	
1986	Adukkan Entheluppam	Menon	
1986	Niramulla Ravulkal	Sudevan	
1986	Snehamulla Simham	Menon	
1986	Sayam Sandhya		
1986	Kshamichu Ennoru Vakku	Judge	
1987	Aalippazhangal	Sekharan Thampi	
1987	Oru Sindoora Pottinte Ormaykku	Alexander	
1987	Aankiliyude Tharattu	Ramachandra Menon	
1987	Vrutham	Jailor	
1988	Loose Loose Arappiri Loose		
1988	Dhinarathrangal	Commissioner Unnithan	
1989	Kodugallur Bagavathi		
1989	Adharvam	Thirumeni	
1989	Adikkurippu	Menon	

==== 1990s ====
Year	Title	Role	Notes
1990	Ee Kanni Koodi	Philip	
1990	Kottayam Kunjachan		
1990	Veena Meettiya Vilangukal		
1990	Kadathanadan Ambadi	Chandrappan's uncle	
1990	Orukkam	Fr. Francis Arakkal	
1990	Indrajaalam	Baba	
1991	Kadalora Kattu		
1991	Ragam Anuragam		
1992	Maanthrika Cheppu		
1993	Maya Mayooram	Nanda's father	
1993	Devaasuram	Ezhuthachan	
1993	Akashadoothu	Fr. Baby	
1994	Chukkan	Narayanan	
1994	Bheesmacharya		
1994	Puthran	Michael	
1995	Highway	Kartha	
1995	Agrajan	Priest	
1995	Thumboli Kadappuram	Antony	
1996	Man of the Match		
1998	Meenathil Thalikettu	Company Manager	
1999	Vazhunnor	Bishop	
1999	Pathram	Madhavan	

==== 2000s ====
Year	Title	Role	Notes
2002	The Gift of God		
2002	Kanalkkireedam		
2003	Ente Veedu Appuvinteyum	Judge	
2003	Mr. Brahmachari	Sukumaran	
2006	Highway Police	Fr. John	

==== 2010s ====
Year	Title	Role	Notes
2011	Traffic	Dr. Simon D Souza	Guest appearance

=== As a singer ===
- "Om Namashivaaya" - Love in Kerala (1968)
- "Oronnoro Chenchorathan" - Avan Varunnu (1954)
- "Neelippenne" - Manasakshi (1954)
- "Kannuneer Nee Choriyaathe" - Sheriyo Thetto (1953)
- "Paadupettu Paadangalil" - Sheriyo Thetto (1953)
- "Thaarame Thaanuvaru" - Sheriyo Thetto (1953)
- "Vaarmazhaville Va" - Sheriyo Thetto (1953)
- "Pokaam Pokaam" - Sheriyo Thetto (1953)
- "Kelkuka Ha" - Alphonsa (1952)
- "Chinthayil Neerunna" - Visappinte Vili (1952)
- "Ramanan" - Visappinte Vili (1952)

=== As a Television actor ===
- Akashadoothu (TV series) (2012)- A teleserial from Surya TV which is the sequel of the hit Malayalam film Akashadoothu
- Mikhaelinte Santhathikal - as Mikhael (Doordarshan)
- Vava (Asianet)
- Avashthantarangal (Kairali TV)

== Sources ==
- "Profile of Malayalam Actor Jose Prakash". en.msidb.org.
