= Irumbazhikal =

- Directed by: A. B. Raj
- Starring: Prem Nazir; Jayan; Jayabharathi; K. P. Ummer
- Edited by: B. S. Mani
- Music by: M. K. Arjunan.
- Production company: Sree Sai Productions
- Distributed by: Sree Sai Productions
- Release date: 12 April 1979
- Country: India
- Language: Malayalam

Irumbazhikal is a 1979 Indian Malayalam Action. Drama film, directed by A. B. Raj. The film stars Prem Nazir, Jayan, Jayabharathi and K. P. Ummer in the lead roles. The film has musical score by M. K. Arjunan.It was a box office hit.

== Cast ==
- Prem Nazir as Inspector Rajan
- Jayan as Bullet Babu
- Jayabharathi as Maya
- K. P. Ummer as Katthi Chandran
- Cochin Haneefa as Krishnankutty
- Paravoor Bharathan as Raghavan
- Jose Prakash as Swami
- P. R. Varalakshmi as Geetha
- Kanakadurga as Sainaba
- Vadivukkarasi as Thulasi
- G. K. Pillai as Sankara Pilla
- Manavalan Joseph
- Murali Mohan
- KPAC Sunny as School Master

== Soundtrack ==
The music was composed by M. K. Arjunan and the lyrics were written by R. K. Damodaran.

No.	Song	Singers	Lyrics	Length (m:ss)
1	"Cherukiliye"	Vani Jairam	R. K. Damodaran	
2	"Indeevarangalimathurannu"	K. J. Yesudas, Jency	R. K. Damodaran	
3	"Leelaathilakamaninju"	K. J. Yesudas, Chorus	R. K. Damodaran	
4	"Mindaappenne Mandippenne"	P. Jayachandran, Vani Jairam, Chorus	R. K. Damodaran	
5	"Oru Kiliye Kiliye"			
6	"Pramadavanathil Rithumathippoo"	S. Janaki	R. K. Damodaran	
