= Baby (director) =

Indian film director

M S. Baby
- Born: Swaminathan Pillai; May 29 1933; Kozhikode, Kerala, India
- Occupation: Film director
- Years active: 1973 – 2001

Baby, also known as M.S. Baby is an Indian film director, producer, actor and scriptwriter who works in the Malayalam film industry. He has directed more than 50 Malayalam movies. Among the popular movies he directed are Lisa (1978), Pappu (1980), Abhinayam (1981) and Veendum Lisa (1987).

== Filmography ==
=== Direction ===
- Manushyaputhran (1973)
- Sapthaswaragal (1974)
- Sankhupushpam (1977)
- Sooryakanthi (1977)
- Lisa (1978)
- Kaathirunna Nimisham (1978)
- Avano Atho Avalo (1979)
- Prabhu (1979)
- Pambaram (1979)
- Anupallavi (1979)
- Tharangam (1979)
- Sarppam (1979)
- Love in Singapore (1980)
- Chandrahaasam (1980)
- Pappu (1980)
- Manushya Mrugam (1980)
- Nizhal Yudham (1981)
- Abhinayam (1981)
- Karimpoocha (1981)
- Saravarsham (1982)
- Amrutha Geetham (1982)
- Samrambham (1983)
- Mortuary (1983)
- Gurudakshina (1983)
- Kurishuyudham (1984)
- NH 47 (1984)
- Oru Sumangaliyude Kadha (1984)
- Onnaamprathi Olivil (1985)
- Bhagavaan (1986)
- Ithu Oru Thudakkam Maathram (1986)
- Veendum Lisa (1987)
- Pathimoonam Number Veedu (1990; Tamil)
- Raktha Jwala (1990; Telugu)
- House No. 13 (1991)
- Manmadha Sarangal (1991)

=== Screenplay ===
- Sapthaswaragal (1974)
- Lisa (1978)
- Avano Atho Avalo (1979)
- Prabhu (1979)
- Anupallavi (1979)
- Pappu (1980)
- Love in Singapore (1980)
- Abhinayam (1981)
- Karimpoocha (1981)
- Saravarsham (1982)
- Veendum Lisa (1987)

=== Production ===
- Chirikkudukka (1976)
- Nirakudam (1977)
- Lillyppookkal (1979)
- Veendum Lisa (1987)

=== Acting ===
- Chithramela (1967)
- Cochin Express (1967)
- Yogamullaval (1971)
- Brahmachaari (1972)
- Rakshassu (1984)

=== Story ===
- Sarppam (1979)
- Abhinayam (1981)
- Veendum Lisa (1987)

=== Editing ===
- Swargaraajyam (1962)

=== Camera ===
- Swargaraajyam (1962)

=== Dialogue ===
- Abhinayam (1981)
