= Oru Sumangaliyude Katha =

- Directed by: Baby
- Written by: Oscar Movies' M. Bhaskar
- Screenplay by: Pappanamkodu Lakshmanan(Dialogue)
- Produced by: S. Kumar
- Starring: Sukumaran; Ambika; Jagathy Sreekumar; Thikkurissy Sukumaran Nair; Ratheesh; Santhosh
- Cinematography: Santhu Roy
- Edited by: G. Murali
- Music by: Shyam; Usha Uthup
- Production company: Sastha Productions
- Distributed by: Sastha Productions
- Release date: 12 January 1984
- Country: India
- Language: Malayalam

Oru Sumangaliyude Katha is a 1984 Indian Malayalam-language film, directed by Baby, with story written by Oscar Movies' M. Bhaskar and produced by S. Kumar. The film stars Jagathy Sreekumar, Thikkurissy Sukumaran Nair, Ratheesh and Santhosh. The film has musical score by Shyam and Usha Uthup.

== Synopsis ==
Rajendran lives with his abnormal behaving wife Yamuna and his daughter. One day Rajendran on returning home finds dead body of Johnny and also finds his wife Yamuna in deep sleep, he suspects his wife killed Johnny so dumps the dead body in a distant slope region and returns home. Next day s.i.vijayan is in search of investigation regarding Johnny . Johnny wife gracy blackmail Rajendran as she knows he came to his house and got dead but demanded only money as she struggling to live as she gives flashback of Johnny as a drunkard and sexual pervert and gracy knows this but Johnny harasses her so everyday gracy has to cry due to Johnny's cruel character. S.i.vijayan finally interrogates Rajendran also and Rajendran manages to avoid the fault on him as he still suspects his Yamuna. Gracy once again blackmail Rajendran a last time as she wish to go faraway and no more troubling Rajendran but this time excess money is demanded. Rajendran accepts to give with great difficulty. And finally ending scene Rajendran finds out the real killer.

== Cast ==
- Sukumaran as Rajendran
- Ratheesh as Johnny
- Ambika as Yamuna
- Jagathy Sreekumar as Sunil Kumar
- Thikkurissy Sukumaran Nair as Yamuna's father
- Santhosh
- Captain Raju as SI Vijayan
- Baby Jayaprabha as Neena
- Baby Shalini as Raji
- Bahadoor as Kumaradas
- Jagannatha Varma as Doctor
- Seema as Gracy
- Vanitha Krishnachandran as Kalyani
- Anuradha as Sophia

== Soundtrack ==
The music was composed by Shyam and Usha Uthup with lyrics by P. Bhaskaran and Usha Uthup.

No.	Song	Singers	Lyrics	Length (m:ss)
1	"Chilanke"	S. Janaki	P. Bhaskaran	
2	"Kaiyonnu"	K. J. Yesudas, Vani Jairam	P. Bhaskaran	
3	"Maanathin"	K. J. Yesudas	P. Bhaskaran	
4	"Oh My Darling"	Chorus, Usha Uthup	Usha Uthup	
