= Sapthaswaragal =

Sapthaswarangal
- Directed by: Baby
- Written by: M. S. Narayanan; Sreekumaran Thampi (dialogues)
- Screenplay by: Baby
- Produced by: M. S. Narayanan
- Starring: Srividya; Raghavan; Adoor Bhasi; Thikkurissy Sukumaran Nair
- Cinematography: V. Namas
- Edited by: G. Venkittaraman
- Music by: V. Dakshinamoorthy
- Production company: Sakhitha Films
- Distributed by: Sakhitha Films
- Release date: 8 November 1974
- Country: India
- Language: Malayalam

Sapthaswarangal is a 1974 Indian Malayalam-language film, directed by Baby and produced by M. S. Narayanan. The film stars Srividya, Raghavan, Adoor Bhasi and Thikkurissy Sukumaran Nair. The film had musical score by V. Dakshinamoorthy.

== Cast ==
- Raghavan as Ajayan
- Srividya as Saraswathi
- Sujatha
- Adoor Bhasi
- Thikkurissy Sukumaran Nair
- Jose Prakash
- Sankaradi
- T. R. Omana
- Paul Vengola
- Rani Chandra
- Kaduvakulam Antony
- Kunchan

== Soundtrack ==
The music was composed by V. Dakshinamoorthy and the lyrics were written by Sreekumaran Thampi.

| No. | Song | Singers | Lyrics | Length (m:ss) |
|---|---|---|---|---|
| 1 | "Anuraaga Narthanathin" | S. Janaki | Sreekumaran Thampi | |
| 2 | "Naadaswaram" (Instrumental) | Namagirippettai Krishnan | | |
| 3 | "Raagavum Thaalavum" | K. J. Yesudas | Sreekumaran Thampi | |
| 4 | "Sapthaswarangal Vidarum" | K. P. Brahmanandan | Sreekumaran Thampi | |
| 5 | "Sringaara Bhaavanayo" | P. Jayachandran | Sreekumaran Thampi | |
| 6 | "Swaathithirunaalin" | P. Jayachandran | Sreekumaran Thampi | |
