= Tharangam (1979 film) =

- Directed by: Baby
- Written by: P. K. Krishnan
- Screenplay by: P. K. Krishnan
- Starring: Prem Nazir; Jose Prakash; Aranmula Ponnamma; K. R. Vijaya
- Edited by: K. Sankunni
- Music by: K. J. Joy
- Production company: HNS Productions
- Distributed by: HNS Productions
- Release date: 9 November 1979
- Country: India
- Language: Malayalam

Tharangam is a 1979 Indian Malayalam film, directed by Baby. The film stars Prem Nazir, Jose Prakash, Aranmula Ponnamma and K. R. Vijaya. The film has a musical score by K. J. Joy.

== Cast ==
- Prem Nazir as Madhu
- Jose Prakash as Gopalan
- Aranmula Ponnamma as Madhu's mother
- Nangasseril Sasi as Madhu's Brother
- K. R. Vijaya as Saumini
- P. K. Abraham
- Priyamvada
- Kanakadurga as Janu
- K. P. A. C. Sunny as Varghese
- Prathapachandran as Nanu
- Jagathy Sreekumar as Pappu
- Sadhana
- Lakshmi
- Poornima Bhagyaraj
- John Vargheese
- Thoppil Divakaran
- O. Chandran

== Soundtrack ==
The music was composed by K. J. Joy and the lyrics were written by Chirayinkeezhu Ramakrishnan Nair.

No.	Song	Singers	Lyrics	Length (m:ss)
1	"Kadhayariyaathe"	K. J. Yesudas	Chirayinkeezhu Ramakrishnan Nair	
2	"Madhurasam"	Sherin Peters	Chirayinkeezhu Ramakrishnan Nair	
3	"Mazhamukil Mayangi"	K. J. Yesudas, S. Janaki	Chirayinkeezhu Ramakrishnan Nair	
4	"Oh My Dream Star"	K. J. Yesudas	Chirayinkeezhu Ramakrishnan Nair	
