= Aalippazhangal =

1987 film

- Directed by: Ramachandran Pillai
- Produced by: Anil Matthew
- Starring: Sukumari; Thilakan; Jose Prakash; Sankaradi
- Cinematography: V. E. Gopinath
- Music by: Darsan Raman
- Production company: Geodaya
- Distributed by: Geodaya
- Release date: 20 February 1987
- Country: India
- Language: Malayalam

Aalippazhangal is a 1987 Indian Malayalam film, directed by Ramachandran Pillai and produced by Geodaya. The film stars Sukumari, Thilakan, Jose Prakash and Sankaradi in the lead roles. The film has musical score by Darsan Raman.

== Cast ==
- Sukumari
- Thilakan
- Jose Prakash
- Sankaradi
- Shankar
- Jagannatha Varma
- KPAC Sunny
- Alummoodan
- Ragini
- Girly
- Appa Haja

== Soundtrack ==
The music was composed by Darsan Raman and the lyrics were written by Mariamma Philip.

No.	Song	Singers	Lyrics	Length (m:ss)
1	"Aadaam Namukku Paadaam"	Chorus, Krishnachandran, Lathika	Mariamma Philip	
2	"Doore Ambaram"	K. J. Yesudas	Mariamma Philip	
3	"Pookkal Vidarnnu"	K. J. Yesudas, P. Susheeladevi	Mariamma Philip	
4	"Saa Ree Gaa Saa Ree Ga Maa"	Chorus, R. Usha	Mariamma Philip	
