= Aranjaanam =

- Directed by: P. Venu
- Written by: P. Venu
- Screenplay by: P. Venu
- Produced by: P. K. Gopi
- Starring: Shankar; Rajkumar; Subhashini; Sumalatha
- Cinematography: K.B.Dayalan
- Music by: K. J. Joy
- Production company: United Cine Productions
- Distributed by: United Cine Productions
- Release date: 21 May 1982
- Country: India
- Language: Malayalam

Aranjaanam is a 1982 Indian Malayalam-language film, directed by P. Venu and produced by P. K. Gopi. The film stars Shankar, Rajkumar, Subhashini and Sumalatha. The film has musical score and songs composed by K. J. Joy.

== Cast ==
- Shankar as Madhu
- Rajkumar as Rajesh
- Subhashini as Priya
- Sumalatha as Anu
- Sukumari as Pappi
- Jagathy Sreekumar as Professor
- Jose Prakash as Colonel

== Soundtrack ==
The music was composed by K. J. Joy and the lyrics were written by P. Bhaskaran.

No.	Song	Singers	Length (m:ss)
1	"Aaraadhikayude"	P. Susheela	
2	"Maasam Maadhavamaasam"	P. Jayachandran, Vani Jairam	
3	"Neelamegha Maalakal"	K. J. Yesudas, S. Janaki	
