= Raju Rahim =

- Directed by: A. B. Raj
- Written by: V. P. Sarathy
- Screenplay by: V. P. Sarathy
- Produced by: R. S. Sreenivasan
- Starring: Prem Nazir; K. P. Ummer; Raghavan; Bahadoor; G. K. Pillai
- Cinematography: Vipin Das
- Music by: M. K. Arjunan
- Production company: Sree Sai Productions
- Distributed by: Sree Sai Productions
- Release date: 9 March 1978
- Country: India
- Language: Malayalam

Raju Rahim is a 1978 Indian Malayalam film, directed by A. B. Raj and produced by R. S. Sreenivasan. The film stars Prem Nazir, K. P. Ummer, Raghavan, Bahadoor and G. K. Pillai in the lead roles. The film has musical score by M. K. Arjunan.

== Cast ==
- Prem Nazir as Raju
- K. P. Ummer as Rahim
- Raghavan as Suresh
- Bahadoor as Chandrappan
- G. K. Pillai as Vikraman
- Vidhubala as Shobha
- prathapachandran as Kesavan
- Manavalan Joseph as Eastman Antony
- Karan as Master Raju
- Paravoor Bharathan as Bharathan
- Cochin Haneefa as Babu

== Soundtrack ==
The music was composed by M. K. Arjunan and the lyrics were written by Chirayinkeezhu Ramakrishnan Nair, R. K. Damodaran and Bharanikkavu Sivakumar.

No.	Song	Singers	Lyrics	Length (m:ss)
1	"Bhoomiyilirangiya"	P. Jayachandran	Chirayinkeezhu Ramakrishnan Nair	
2	"Bruce Lee Kunjallayo"	P. Jayachandran, P. B. Sreenivas, C. O. Anto	R. K. Damodaran	
3	"Oru Thulli Anukamba"	P. Jayachandran	Chirayinkeezhu Ramakrishnan Nair	
4	"Ravivarma Chithrathin"	K. J. Yesudas	R. K. Damodaran	
5	"Thankatherulla"	K. J. Yesudas	Bharanikkavu Sivakumar	
