= Kaathirunna Nimisham =

1978 film directed by Baby

- Poster
- Directed by: Baby
- Written by: Vijayan
- Screenplay by: Vijayan
- Starring: Kamal Haasan; Vidhubala; Jayan; Jayabharathi; M. G. Soman
- Cinematography: Vipindas
- Edited by: K. Sankunni
- Music by: M. K. Arjunan
- Production company: Dhanya Enterprises
- Distributed by: Evershine
- Release date: 17 February 1978
- Country: India
- Language: Malayalam

Kaathirunna Nimisham (transl. The awaited moment) is a 1978 Indian Malayalam-language film, directed by Baby. The film stars Kamal Haasan, Vidhubala, Jayan, Jayabharathi and M. G. Soman. The film has musical score by M. K. Arjunan.

== Cast ==
- Kamal Haasan as Raju
- Vidhubala as Sumathi
- Jayan as Venu
- Jayabharathi as Ramani/Devi
- Sukumaran as Raghu
- M. G. Soman as Gopi
- Kuthiravattom Pappu as Harischandran Nair
- Jagathy Sreekumar as V. N. Kumaran
- Kunchan as Pottan
- Mallika Sukumaran as Savithri
- Nellikode Bhaskaran as Venu's father
- Nilambur Balan as Ashan
- Nilambur Ayisha as Raju's mother
- K. P. A. C. Lalitha as Ambujam

== Production ==
Kaathirunna Nimisham film produced under production banner Dhanya Enterprises. This film was shot in black-and-white. It was given an "U" (Unrestricted) certificate by the Central Board of Film Certification. The final length of the film was 3,856.22 metres (12,651.6 ft).

== Soundtrack ==
The music was composed by M. K. Arjunan and the lyrics were written by Sreekumaran Thampi.

No.	Song	Singers	Lyrics	Length (m:ss)
1	"Chempakathaikal Pootha"	K. J. Yesudas	Sreekumaran Thampi	
2	"Kaattilolangal"	P. Jayachandran	Sreekumaran Thampi	
3	"Maavupoothu"	S. Janaki	Sreekumaran Thampi	
4	"Punchirichal"	P. Jayachandran, Vani Jairam	Sreekumaran Thampi	
5	"Shaakhaa Nagarathil"	K. J. Yesudas	Sreekumaran Thampi	

== view the film ==
- kathirunna nimisham Malayalam movie.
