= Sukradasa =

1977 film

- Directed by: Anthikkad Mani
- Written by: K. G. Sethunath
- Screenplay by: K. G. Sethunath
- Starring: Raghavan; Jayabharathi; Jayan; Adoor Bhasi; Jose Prakash; Sreelatha Namboothiri
- Cinematography: V. Namas
- Edited by: K. Sankunni
- Music by: M. K. Arjunan
- Production company: Ragam Pictures
- Distributed by: Ragam Pictures
- Release date: 12 August 1977
- Country: India
- Language: Malayalam

Sukradasa is a 1977 Indian Malayalam film, directed by Anthikkad Mani. The film stars Jayabharathi, Raghavan, Adoor Bhasi, Jose Prakash and Sreelatha Namboothiri in the lead roles. The film has musical score by M. K. Arjunan.

== Cast ==
- Jayabharathi
- Raghavan
- Jayan
- Adoor Bhasi
- Jose Prakash
- Sreelatha Namboothiri
- Paul Vengola

== Soundtrack ==
The music was composed by M. K. Arjunan and the lyrics were written by Mankombu Gopalakrishnan.

No.	Song	Singers	Lyrics	Length (m:ss)
1	"Lajjaavathi Lajjaavathi Lahari Koluthum"	K. J. Yesudas	Mankombu Gopalakrishnan	
2	"Last Night"	Vani Jairam	Mankombu Gopalakrishnan	
3	"Mrithasanjeevani"	K. J. Yesudas	Mankombu Gopalakrishnan	
4	"Pushyaragam Pozhikkunna Sandhye"	K. P. Brahmanandan, B. Vasantha	Mankombu Gopalakrishnan	
