= Itha Oru Theeram =

- Directed by: P. G. Vishwambharan
- Written by: A. Sheriff
- Screenplay by: A. Sheriff
- Produced by: O. M. John
- Starring: Soman, Sukumari; Jayabharathi; Kaviyoor Ponnamma; Kuthiravattam Pappu
- Cinematography: C. Ramachandra Menon
- Edited by: K. Narayanan
- Music by: K. J. Joy
- Production company: St. Joseph Cine Arts
- Distributed by: St. Joseph Cine Arts
- Release date: 4 May 1979
- Country: India
- Language: Malayalam

Itha Oru Theeram is a 1979 Indian Malayalam film, directed by P. G. Vishwambharan and produced by O. M. John. The film stars Soman, Sukumari, Jayabharathi, Kaviyoor Ponnamma and Kuthiravattam Pappu in the lead roles. The film has musical score by K. J. Joy and portraits the evergreen Malayalam song Akkareyikkare Ninnal Anganey. The film turned out to be a super hit.

== Cast ==
- Sukumari as Meenakshi
- Jayabharathi as Sudha
- Kaviyoor Ponnamma as Madhavi
- Kuthiravattam Pappu as Chellappan
- M. G. Soman as Gopi
- Bahadoor as Sankara Pilla
- Janardhanan as Chandran
- Bhavani as Valsala
- Thampi Kannanthanam as boatman in Akkaeyikkare

== Soundtrack ==
The music was composed by K. J. Joy and the lyrics were written by Yusufali Kechery.

No.	Song	Singers	Length (m:ss)
1	"Akkareyikkare"	K. J. Yesudas	
2	"Premamenna Kalayil"	S. Janaki	
3	"Raajakumaran Pandoru"	P. Jayachandran, Vani Jairam, Chorus	
4	"Thaalolam Kili Raareeram"	P. Jayachandran, Vani Jairam	
