= Love in Singapore (1980 Telugu film) =

- Poster
- Directed by: OSR Anjaneyulu
- Dialogue by: Modukuri Johnson; Chittibabu
- Produced by: M. Venkata Ramana Kumar
- Starring: Ranganath; Latha; Chiranjeevi; Jose Prakash
- Music by: Shankar–Ganesh
- Production company: Sri Venkateswara Swamy Films
- Release date: 27 September 1980
- Country: India
- Language: Telugu

Love in Singapore is a 1980 Indian Telugu-language action drama film directed by OSR Anjaneyulu and starring Ranganath, Latha, Chiranjeevi, and Jose Prakash (in his Telugu debut). The film was simultaneously shot in Malayalam with the same name with a different director starring Prem Nazir and Jayan. Some footage from the Malayalam version was reused in Telugu.

== Plot ==
In a village in Andhra Pradesh, rebels steal the diamond from a Kali Sword and take it to Singapore. The central government hands over the case to the CBI, who appoints officer Prem to bring the stolen jewel back to India. Prem leaves for Singapore and meets his younger brother Suresh, who ran away from home as a child. How Prem and Suresh together return the jewel back to India forms the rest of the story.

== Cast ==
- Ranganath as Prem
- Latha as Sudha
- Chiranjeevi as Suresh
- Jose Prakash

The uncredited cast includes:

- Madeline Teo as Madeline
- Mukkamala
- Hema Sundar
- P. J. Sarma
- Attili Lakshmi

The rest of the cast consists of junior artistes from Singapore.

== Production ==
This was the first film that Chiranjeevi had clapped for the muhurat shot. This film was shot in Bangkok, Hong Kong, Malaysia and Singapore for about twenty days. This film marked Chiranjeevi's first film shot outside of India. Although both Ranganath and Chiranjeevi's roles were given equal importance to the media during shooting, the film was promoted as a Chiranjeevi film prior to release due to his craze at the time post the success of Punnami Naagu (1980).

== Release and reception ==
The film had a preview at Meena Theatre in Chennai (then Madras), which was attended by Kamal Haasan. The film was released a week after Kaali and Thathayya Premaleelalu, both starring Chiranjeevi. The film was dubbed and released in Tamil with the same title.

Kalki reviewed the Tamil version praising the acting of Chiranjeevi, cinematography and music but found OSR's direction as okay. A writer from Movie Volume wrote that the film's fights are the main attraction while also praising Chiranjeevi's dance and Shankar–Ganesh's music. A writer from iDreamPost felt that Chiranjeevi had become a better actor through this film. The film was a box office success.
