= Santha Oru Devatha =

- Directed by: M. Krishnan Nair
- Written by: K. P. Kottarakkara
- Produced by: K. P. Kottarakkara
- Starring: Madhu; Sukumari; Thikkurissy Sukumaran Nair; Jose Prakash
- Cinematography: N. Karthikeyan
- Edited by: K. Sankunni
- Music by: M. K. Arjunan
- Production company: Jaydevi Movies
- Release date: 21 October 1977
- Country: India
- Language: Malayalam

Santha Oru Devatha is a 1977 Indian Malayalam-language film, directed by M. Krishnan Nair and produced by K. P. Kottarakkara. The film stars Madhu, Sukumari, Thikkurissy Sukumaran Nair and Jose Prakash. It is a remake of the Tamil film Pasamalar.

== Cast ==
- Madhu
- Sukumari
- Thikkurissy Sukumaran Nair
- Jose Prakash
- Sukumaran
- K. R. Vijaya

== Soundtrack ==
The music was composed by M. K. Arjunan and the lyrics were written by Sreekumaran Thampi.

Song	Singers
"Kochuswapnangal Than"	K. J. Yesudas
"Madhuvidhu Raathrikal"	P. Jayachandran, Vani Jairam
"Nilavilakkin Thiri"	Vani Jairam
"Omanappoomukham"	P. Susheela
"Omanappoomukham" (D)	K. J. Yesudas, Vani Jairam
"Omanappoomukham" (M)	K. J. Yesudas
