= Bhaktha Hanuman =

- Directed by: Ganga
- Screenplay by: Nagavally R. S. Kurup
- Produced by: S. Kumar
- Starring: Janardhana Rao; Balan K. Nair; Jose Prakash; Lalu Alex; Sreelatha Namboothiri
- Cinematography: Masthan
- Edited by: N. Gopalakrishnan
- Music by: V. Dakshinamoorthy
- Production company: Sastha Productions
- Distributed by: Sastha Productions
- Release date: 27 September 1980
- Country: India
- Language: Malayalam

Bhaktha Hanuman (transl. Devote Hanuman) is a 1980 Indian Malayalam-language mythological drama film directed by Ganga and produced by S. Kumar. It is based on the Hindu deity Hanuman. The film stars Telugu actor Arja Janardhana Rao as Hanuman. The film's musical score was written by V. Dakshinamoorthy. It was dubbed into Telugu as Anjaneya Charithra.

== Plot ==
The film tells the story of the Lord Hanuman, who is worshipped by Hindus throughout the world, and has an important place of his own as a devotee of Lord Rama. It is told by Hanuman himself when he meets the Pandava Bhima, his younger half-brother.

== Cast ==
- Janardhana Rao as Hanuman
- Ravikumar as Rama
- Shobhana (Roja Ramani) as Sita
- Hari as Lakshman
- Balan K. Nair as Ravana
- Ushakumari as Mandodari
- Jose Prakash as Vibhishana
- Lalu Alex as Meghanadhan a.k.a. Indrajit
- Sreelatha Namboothiri as Thara
- Sukumari as Anjana (Hanuman's mother)
- Jyothi Lakshmi as Dancer at Indra's court
- Jayamalini as Dancer at Ravana's court
- Halam as Dancer at Indra's court
- Leela

== Soundtrack ==
The music was composed by V. Dakshinamoorthy and the lyrics were written by Sreekumaran Thampi.

No.	Song	Singers	Lyrics	Length (m:ss)
1	"Aananda Nadanam"	P. Susheela, Vani Jairam	Sreekumaran Thampi	
2	"Charithra Naayaka"	P. Susheela	Sreekumaran Thampi	
3	"Ilavangappoovukal"	K. J. Yesudas, Ambili	Sreekumaran Thampi	
4	"Jagalpraana Nandana"	K. J. Yesudas	Sreekumaran Thampi	
5	"Naagendra Haaraaya" (Slokam)	K. J. Yesudas		
6	"Raamajayam Sreeramajayam"	K. J. Yesudas, Chorus	Sreekumaran Thampi	
7	"Rama Rama Rama"	K. J. Yesudas	Sreekumaran Thampi	
8	"Sandhyaa Vihagam"	Vani Jairam	Sreekumaran Thampi	
9	"Varshappoomukil"	Chorus, Kalyani Menon	Sreekumaran Thampi	
