= Pulivalu =

- Directed by: J. Sasikumar
- Written by: Veeran; S. L. Puram Sadanandan (dialogues)
- Screenplay by: S. L. Puram Sadanandan
- Produced by: V. M. Chandi
- Starring: Prem Nazir; Jayabharathi; Jose Prakash; Sreelatha Namboothiri
- Music by: M. K. Arjunan
- Production company: MS Productions
- Distributed by: MS Productions
- Release date: 25 July 1975
- Country: India
- Language: Malayalam

Pulivalu is a 1975 Indian Malayalam film directed by J. Sasikumar and produced by V. M. Chandi, with Prem Nazir, Jayabharathi, Jose Prakash and Sreelatha Namboothiri in the lead roles. Its score was composed by M. K. Arjunan.

== Cast ==
- Prem Nazir
- Jayabharathi
- Jose Prakash
- Sreelatha Namboothiri
- M. G. Soman
- Manju Bhargavi
- Meena
- Muthukulam Raghavan Pillai
- Veeran

== Soundtrack ==
The music was composed by M. K. Arjunan and the lyrics were written by Sreekumaran Thampi.

No.	Song	Singers	Lyrics	Length (m:ss)
1	"Kaali Malankaali"	C. O. Anto	Sreekumaran Thampi	
2	"Lajjaavathi"	K. J. Yesudas, Vani Jairam	Sreekumaran Thampi	
3	"Oru Swapnathil"	P. Madhuri	Sreekumaran Thampi	
4	"Paathiraanakshathram"	K. J. Yesudas	Sreekumaran Thampi	
5	"Vasanthaminnoru"	K. J. Yesudas	Sreekumaran Thampi	
