= Paarijatham (1976 film) =

Paarijaatham
- Directed by: Mansoor
- Written by: S. L. Puram Sadanandan
- Screenplay by: S. L. Puram Sadanandan
- Produced by: R. Somanathan
- Starring: Prem Nazir; Kaviyoor Ponnamma; Adoor Bhasi; Jose Prakash
- Cinematography: K. G. Vijayan
- Edited by: K. Sankunni
- Music by: M. K. Arjunan
- Production company: Soorya Pictures
- Distributed by: Soorya Pictures
- Release date: 2 December 1976
- Country: India
- Language: Malayalam

Paarijaatham is a 1976 Indian Malayalam-language film directed by Mansoor and produced by R. Somanathan. The film stars Prem Nazir, Kaviyoor Ponnamma, Adoor Bhasi and Jose Prakash. The film has musical score by M. K. Arjunan.

== Cast ==
- Prem Nazir
- Kaviyoor Ponnamma
- Adoor Bhasi
- Jose Prakash
- Sreelatha Namboothiri
- Alummoodan
- Meena
- Vidhubala

== Soundtrack ==
The music was composed by M. K. Arjunan with lyrics by Sreekumaran Thampi.

No.	Song	Singers	Lyrics	Length (m:ss)
1	"Chundil Virinjathu"	P. Jayachandran, Vani Jairam	Sreekumaran Thampi	
2	"Maanam Potti Veenu"	C. O. Anto, Jolly Abraham, Vinayan	Sreekumaran Thampi	
3	"Thottaal Pottum Rasakkudukke"	K. J. Yesudas	Sreekumaran Thampi	
4	"Udayadeepika"	K. J. Yesudas	Sreekumaran Thampi	
