= Love in Singapore (1980 Malayalam film) =

1980 film directed by Baby

- Promotional poster
- Directed by: Baby
- Written by: Gopi
- Screenplay by: Baby
- Produced by: M. Chandra Kumar
- Starring: Prem Nazir; Jayan; Jose Prakash; Latha
- Cinematography: K. B. Dayalan
- Music by: Shankar–Ganesh
- Release date: 28 February 1980
- Country: India
- Language: Malayalam

Love in Singapore is a 1980 Indian Malayalam-language film, directed by Baby. The film stars Prem Nazir, Jayan, Jose Prakash and Latha. The film has musical score by Shankar–Ganesh. This movie upon release gained positive reviews and became a commercial success. It was simultaneously shot in Telugu with the same name starring Ranganath and Chiranjeevi.

== Plot ==
Premkumar and Suresh are brothers. One night the brothers fight and the father hits the younger brother and he leaves the house in anger. The same night a villain comes to their house and kills the father as revenge for sending the villain to jail.

Premkumar grows up to be a police officer just like his father and is sent to Singapore to track down a jewel-encrusted ancient sword stolen from the local temple. Suresh is in Singapore and has a Chinese girlfriend. Prem meets and falls in love with Sudha whose father is held captive by Sethu who is behind the theft of the sword. The brothers meet and recognize each other. The brothers are held captive by Sethu while they were trying to escape with the sword. The brothers escape and chase down Sethu and returns to India with the sword.

== Cast ==
- Prem Nazir as Premkumar
- Jayan as Suresh
- Madeline Teo as Madeline
- Jose Prakash as Rowdy Sethu
- Latha as Sudha
- Kaviyoor Ponnamma as Mother of Premkumar and Suresh
- Prathapachandran as SI Krishnan Nair, Father of Premkumar and Suresh
- Steven Thoo
- Peter Chong

== Soundtrack ==
The music was composed by Shankar–Ganesh and the lyrics were written by Ettumanoor Sreekumar.

Song	Singers
"Chaam Chacha"	P. Susheela, P. Jayachandran
"Madamilakanu Meyyake"	S. Janaki, P. Jayachandran
"Mayilaadum Medukalil"	K. J. Yesudas, P. Susheela
"Njan Raaja"	S. Janaki, P. Jayachandran
"Rithulayamunarunnu"	S. Janaki, P. Jayachandran
