= Kilungaatha Changalakal =

- Directed by: C. N. Venkita Swamy
- Written by: G. N. Venkataswami
- Screenplay by: G. N. Venkataswami
- Produced by: C. N. Venkita Swamy
- Starring: Prem Nazir; Sumalatha; Jose Prakash; Ushakumari
- Cinematography: Padmanabhan
- Music by: A. T. Ummer
- Production company: Chandrakala Pictures
- Distributed by: Chandrakala Pictures
- Release date: 19 June 1981
- Country: India
- Language: Malayalam

Kilungaatha Changalakal is a 1981 Indian Malayalam film, directed and produced by C. N. Venkita Swamy. The film stars Prem Nazir, Sumalatha, Jose Prakash and Ushakumari in the lead roles. The film has musical score by A. T. Ummer.

== Cast ==
- Prem Nazir as Mohan
- Sumalatha as Latha
- Jose Prakash as Rajaram
- Ushakumari as Rekha
- Alummoodan as Kochunni
- Kunjan as Pappan
- PK Abraham as Police inspector
- Sunkara Lakshmi as Julie
- Murali Mohan as Murali
- V.G.S Dev
- Rajashekaran
- Jaggi
- Chirayinkeezhu Ramakrishnan Nair
- Saam
- Lakshmi
- Meena
- Surekha
- Halam
- Mamatha

== Soundtrack ==
The music was composed by A. T. Ummer and the lyrics were written by Chirayinkeezhu Ramakrishnan Nair.

No.	Song	Singers	Lyrics	Length (m:ss)
1	"Sukham Inakalil"	Vani Jairam	Chirayinkeezhu Ramakrishnan Nair	
