= Avano Atho Avalo =

- Directed by: Baby
- Written by: Kashinath; P. Balakrishnan (dialogues)
- Screenplay by: Baby
- Story by: Kashinath
- Starring: Jayan; KP Ummer; Jagathy Sreekumar; Jose; Jose Prakash
- Cinematography: Vipin Das
- Edited by: K. Sankunni
- Music by: M. K. Arjunan; Lyrics: Bichu Thirumala
- Production company: Soorya Pictures
- Distributed by: Soorya Pictures
- Release date: 29 May 1979
- Country: India
- Language: Malayalam

Avano Atho Avalo (transl. Him or Her) is a 1979 Indian Malayalam film, directed by Baby and Kashinath. The film stars Jayan, KP Ummer, Jagathy Sreekumar, Jose and Jose Prakash in the lead roles. The film has musical score by M. K. Arjunan. The film was a remake of the Kannada film Aparichita.

== Plot ==
Shashi, the son of an estate owner, goes missing one morning, and the subsequent police investigation unearths some unpleasant family secrets and hidden agendas.

== Cast ==
- Jayan as Cid Inspector Prakash
- K. P. Ummer as Mohan
- Jose Prakash as Surendran
- Jagathy Sreekumar as Velappan
- Vadivukkarasi as Gawri
- Prathapachandran as Narayanan
- Kanakadurga as Sharada
- Sathaar
- Ashokan
- Jose
- Sudeer
- John Varghees
- Vinayan as Sasi
- Vasanthan
- Vanchiyoor Radha as Janaki Amma, Gawri's mother
- Gowri
- Jaya Gowri

== Soundtrack ==
The music was composed by M. K. Arjunan and the lyrics were written by Bichu Thirumala.

No.	Song	Singers	Lyrics	Length (m:ss)
1	"Thulaseevanam Virinju"	K. J. Yesudas	Bichu Thirumala	
2	"Vaasanachendukale"	K. J. Yesudas	Bichu Thirumala	
3	"Vellathilezhuthiya"	Vani Jairam	Bichu Thirumala	
4	"Vellimekham Chela Chuttiya"	P. Jayachandran	Bichu Thirumala	
