= Aalmaaraattam =

1978 film directed by P. Venu

- Directed by: P. Venu
- Written by: P. Venu
- Starring: Sudheer; K. P. Ummer; Ravikumar; Sadhana
- Music by: M. K. Arjunan
- Production company: Lekha Movies
- Distributed by: Lekha Movies
- Release date: 14 January 1978
- Country: India
- Language: Malayalam

Aalmaaraattam is a 1978 Indian Malayalam film, directed by P. Venu. The film stars Vincent, K. P. Ummer, Sudheer and Sadhana in the lead roles. The film has musical score by M. K. Arjunan.

== Cast ==
- Jose Prakash
- K. P. Ummer
- Sudheer
- Vincent
- Ravikumar
- Sadhana
- Vijayalalitha
- Chandrakala

== Soundtrack ==
The music was composed by M. K. Arjunan and the lyrics were written by P. Venu and Konniyoor Bhas.

No.	Song	Singers	Lyrics	Length (m:ss)
1	"Arinju Sakhi"	Vani Jairam	P. Venu	
2	"Ennadharam"	Ambili	Konniyoor Bhas	
3	"Kaamini Kaatharamizhi"	P. Jayachandran	P. Venu	
4	"Kan Kulirke"	P. Jayachandran	Konniyoor Bhas	
5	"Pulakamunarthum"	Ambili	Konniyoor Bhas	
