= Aanakkalari =

1978 film

- Directed by: A. B. Raj
- Written by: Pappanamkodu Lakshmanan
- Screenplay by: Pappanamkodu Lakshmanan
- Produced by: A. B. Raj
- Starring: Vincent; Sathaar; Unnimary; G. K. Pillai
- Edited by: K. Sankunni
- Music by: M. K. Arjunan
- Production company: Kalarenjini Films
- Distributed by: Kalarenjini Films
- Release date: 17 November 1978
- Country: India
- Language: Malayalam

Aanakkalari is a 1978 Indian Malayalam film, directed and produced by A. B. Raj. The film stars Vincent, Sathaar, Unnimary and Jose Prakash in the lead roles. The film has musical score by M. K. Arjunan.

== Cast ==
- Vincent
- Unnimary
- Jose Prakash
- Sathar
- G. K. Pillai
- Kuthiravattam Pappu
- T. P. Madhavan
- Nellikode Bhaskaran
- Jagathy Sreekumar
- K.P.A.C. Sunny
- Prathapachandran

== Soundtrack ==
The music was composed by M. K. Arjunan and the lyrics were written by Sreekumaran Thampi.

No.	Song	Singers	Lyrics	Length (m:ss)
1	"Ganapathiye Sharanam"	Vani Jairam	Sreekumaran Thampi	
2	"Madana Sopaanathil"	Ambili, Jency	Sreekumaran Thampi	
3	"Sandhyaa Pushpangal"	K. J. Yesudas	Sreekumaran Thampi	
4	"Vanaraajamallikal"	K. J. Yesudas	Sreekumaran Thampi	
