= Amma (1976 film) =

- Directed by: M. Krishnan Nair
- Screenplay by: K. P. Kottarakkara
- Story by: Nihar Ranjan Gupta
- Produced by: K. P. Kottarakkara
- Starring: Madhu; Srividya; Adoor Bhasi; Jose Prakash
- Cinematography: N. Karthikeyan
- Edited by: K. Sankunni
- Music by: M. K. Arjunan
- Production company: Jayadevi Movies
- Release date: 5 February 1976
- Country: India
- Language: Malayalam

Amma (transl. Mother) is a 1976 Indian Malayalam-language film, directed by M. Krishnan Nair and produced by K. P. Kottarakkara. The film stars Madhu, Srividya, Adoor Bhasi and Jose Prakash. It is a remake of the Bengali film Maya Mriga (1960), itself based on the play of the same name by Nihar Ranjan Gupta.

== Cast ==
- Madhu
- Srividya
- Adoor Bhasi
- Jose Prakash
- Paul Vengola
- Ambili
- K. R. Vijaya
- Kaduvakulam Antony
- Khadeeja
- Kunchan
- Marykutty
- P. R. Menon
- Ravikumar
- Roja Ramani
- Shylaja

== Soundtrack ==
The music was composed by M. K. Arjunan and the lyrics were written by Sreekumaran Thampi.

Song	Singers
"Chandrakiranangal"	Vani Jairam, Srikanth
"Janani Jayikkunnu"	P. Jayachandran, Chorus
"Nidhiyum Kondunadakkunnu"	P. Jayachandran
"Poothulayum Poomaram"	P. Susheela
"Ragadevatha Deepam"	K. J. Yesudas
"Rathisukhasaare"	Vani Jairam
