= Saravarsham =

- Directed by: Baby
- Screenplay by: Baby
- Story by: Sunil Kumar
- Produced by: V. D. Padmarajan
- Starring: Sukumaran; Zarina Wahab; Mammootty; Sathyakala
- Cinematography: Anandakuttan
- Edited by: K. Shankunni
- Music by: Shyam
- Production company: Padmarajan Films
- Distributed by: Central Pictures
- Release date: 23 July 1982
- Country: India
- Language: Malayalam

Saravarsham is a 1982 Malayalam drama film starring Sukumaran, Zarina Wahab, Mammootty and Sathyakala.

== Plot ==
Sumesh is the only child of his parents. He is living in constant depression after knowing that he is impotent and cannot have children. Adding to his depression, his wife is an alcoholic and leads a troubled life. One day Sumesh learns that his father has a daughter in an illegitimate relationship. His half-sister Savitha happens to be his friend's wife and Sumesh becomes so close to her family considering that her son would be his only legal heir. But Savitha's husband Rajashekharan starts suspecting his wife about the relationship with Sumesh. He discovers the truth only after it is too late.

== Cast ==
- Sukumaran as Dr. K. Sumesh
- Zarina Wahab as Savitha
- Mammootty as Rajashekharan
- Sathyakala as Sumathi
- Bahadur as Ravunni Nair
- Jagannatha Varma as Meleppattu Ramakrishnan Nair
- Kailas Nath as Dr. Varma
- Santhakumari as Lakshmi Amma
- Jose Prakash as Sumathi's father
- Prathapachandran as Savitha's father
- T. R. Omana as Devakiyamma
- Meena as Savitha's mother

== Soundtrack ==
The music was composed by Shyam and the lyrics were written by Poovachal Khader.

No.	Song	Singers	Lyrics	Length (m:ss)
1	"Ee Jwaalayil"	K. J. Yesudas	Poovachal Khader	
2	"Moha Sindhuvil"	Chorus, Lathika	Poovachal Khader	
3	"Oru Raaga Nimishathin"	Vani Jairam	Poovachal Khader	
4	"Sharavarsham Sharavarsham"	K. J. Yesudas	Poovachal Khader	
5	"Then Pookkalil"	S. Janaki, Unni Menon, Kausalya	Poovachal Khader	

== view the film ==
- saravarsham
