= Sankhupushpam =

- Directed by: Baby
- Screenplay by: Surasu
- Story by: Vijayan
- Produced by: Dhanya Enterprises
- Starring: M. G. Soman; Vidhubala; Sukumaran; KPAC Lalitha; Jose Prakash; Prema
- Cinematography: P. S. Nivas
- Music by: M. K. Arjunan
- Production company: Dhanya Productions
- Release date: 2 March 1977
- Country: India
- Language: Malayalam

Sankhupushpam is a 1977 Indian Malayalam-language film, directed by Baby and produced by Dhanya Enterprises. The film stars M. G. Soman, Vidhubala, Sukumaran, Sukumari, KPAC Lalitha, Jose Prakash and Prema. The film has musical score by M. K. Arjunan.

== Cast ==
- MG Soman as Gopi
- Sukumaran as Venu
- Bahadoor as Mammad
- Vidhubala as Devi
- KPAC Lalitha as Amina
- Jose Prakash as Dr. Jose
- Prema as Madhaviyamma
- Nilambur Balan as Balan
- Baby Sumathi as Mini
- Philomina as Naaniyamma
- Nellikode Bhaskaran as Bheeran
- Kunchan as Govindan
- Kuthiravattom Pappu as Rajesh

== Soundtrack ==
The music was composed by M. K. Arjunan and the lyrics were written by Sreekumaran Thampi and Sreedharanunni.

| No. | Song | Singers | Lyrics | Length (m:ss) |
|---|---|---|---|---|
| 1 | "Aayiram Ajantha" | K. J. Yesudas | Sreekumaran Thampi | |
| 2 | "Aayiram Ajantha" | K. J. Yesudas, S. Janaki | Sreekumaran Thampi | |
| 3 | "Puthunaari Vannallo" | P. Jayachandran | Sreekumaran Thampi | |
| 4 | "Sapthaswarangalaadum" | Vani Jairam | Sreekumaran Thampi | |
| 5 | "Swapnathil Ninnoral" | P. Jayachandran | Sreedharanunni | |
