= Karimpoocha =

- Directed by: Baby
- Written by: Chempil John
- Screenplay by: Baby
- Produced by: Baby
- Starring: Ratheesh; Seema; Jagathy Sreekumar; Jose Prakash; Meena
- Cinematography: K. B. Dayalan
- Edited by: K. Sankunni
- Music by: K. J. Joy
- Production company: Arunodaya Cine Arts
- Distributed by: Arunodaya Cine Arts
- Release date: 20 November 1981
- Country: India
- Language: Malayalam

Karimpoocha (transl. Black Cat)is a 1981 Indian Malayalam horror film, directed and produced by Baby. The film stars Ratheesh, Seema, Jagathy Sreekumar, Jose Prakash and Meena in the lead roles. The film's score was composed by K. J. Joy.

== Cast ==
- Ratheesh as Joy
- Seema as Leena
- Jagathy Sreekumar as Pappu
- Jose Prakash as Cheriyachan
- Meena as Annamma
- Johny
- Charuhasan as Priest
- VKB Menon as Satheesh
- Vallathol Unnikrishnan
- Thodupuzha Radhakrishnan as Kriyachan
- Kundani Satheerthyan

== Soundtrack ==
The music was composed by K. J. Joy and the lyrics were written by Poovachal Khader.

No.	Song	Singers	Lyrics	Length (m:ss)
1	"Aparichitha"	Vani Jairam, Chorus	Poovachal Khader	
2	"Laavanya Devathayalle"	K. J. Yesudas	Poovachal Khader	
3	"Neeyen Jeevanil"	K. J. Yesudas, P. Susheela	Poovachal Khader	
4	"Thaalangalil Nee"	K. J. Yesudas	Poovachal Khader	
