= Makkal =

- Directed by: K. S. Sethumadhavan
- Written by: E. P. Kurian; Parappurathu (dialogues)
- Screenplay by: K. S. Sethumadhavan
- Produced by: M. O. Joseph
- Starring: Jayabharathi; Kaviyoor Ponnamma; Adoor Bhasi; Jose Prakash
- Cinematography: Balu Mahendra
- Edited by: M. S. Mani
- Music by: G. Devarajan
- Production company: Manjilas
- Distributed by: Manjilas
- Release date: 10 October 1975
- Country: India
- Language: Malayalam

Makkal is a 1975 Indian Malayalam film, directed by K. S. Sethumadhavan and produced by M. O. Joseph. The film stars Jayabharathi, Kaviyoor Ponnamma, Adoor Bhasi and Jose Prakash in the lead roles. The film has musical score by G. Devarajan.

== Cast ==
- Jayabharathi
- Kaviyoor Ponnamma
- Adoor Bhasi
- Jose Prakash
- Sankaradi
- Bahadoor
- M. G. Soman
- Mallika Sukumaran
- Satheesh Sathyan

== Soundtrack ==
The music was composed by G. Devarajan.

No.	Song	Singers	Lyrics	Length (m:ss)
1	"Aadathe Srishtichu"	P. Jayachandran, C. O. Anto, Sreekanth	Vayalar	
2	"Chellam Chellam"	P. Madhuri	Vayalar	
3	"Raam Banaaye"	Vani Jayaram, Chorus	Rajbal Devaraj	
4	"Sreerangapattanathil"	K. J. Yesudas	Vayalar	
