= R. K. Damodaran =

R K Damodaran
- Born: 1 August 1953 (age 73); Kochi, Kerala, India
- Title: Poet, lyricist, composer
- Spouse: Rajalakshmi
- Children: Anagha
- Website: rkdamodaran.com

R. K. Damodaran (born 1 August 1953) is a poet and lyricist who has worked predominantly in the Malayalam movie industry. He also worked as a journalist in Mathrubhumi from 1982 to 2013. He has written lyrics for almost 3,600 songs in devotional, political, environmental, drama and light music genres, including two Sanskrit songs. He has worked in more than 100 Malayalam films and written songs like "Ravivarma Chithrathin", "Thalam Thettiya Tharatt", "Manjil Chekkerum", "Sukham", "Chandrakiranathin Chandanamunnum", "Thani Thankakkinapponkal" and "Pakalppoove".

== Career ==
Damodaran, from Manjapra in Ernakulam district, studied BA Malayalam at [[Maharajas College, Kochi]] and Sanskrit language at Bharatiya Vidya Bhavan, Kochi. He entered the film music world in 1977, when he was a second year BA student at Maharaja's College. His first song was "Ravivarma Chithrathin Rathi Bhavame" for the 1978 movie Raju Rahim (recorded on 2 November 1977 at AVM-C Theatre, Chennai). He soon made a name for himself in the Malayalam movie industry. During a career spanning over four decades, he has written 118 film songs and worked with music masters like Dakshinamurthy, Devarajan Master, M. S. Viswanathan, Ilayaraja, Arjunan Master, Johnson, Raveendran, Syam, S. P. Venkitesh, Jerry Amaldev, Perumbavoor G. Raveendranath, Vidyadharan, Mohan Sithara, T. S. Radhakrishnan, Vidya Sagar, K.P. Udayabhanu, M. Jayachandran, Deepak Dev and Berny-Ignatious. The film Cleopatra, released in 2013, was his last film.

Besides writing lyrics for Malayalam movies, he also published four books. Two were collection of his poetry, Athunathanam and Kadharaavaneeyam. The other two were devotional song collections namely Amme Narayana and Aravana Madhuram. He also wrote two dramas, Poorapparambu and Kannakiyude Mula. He has also learned to play the chenda, Kerala's traditional percussion instrument, from Babu Kanjilasseri of Kozhikode.

Damodaran was selected as a member of the Kerala Sangeetha Nataka Academy during 2001 to 2004 which is run by the government of Kerala. Since 2012, he has been an executive member of Bharat Bhavan which is under the Department of Culture, government of Kerala. He has been an executive member of Samastha Kerala Sahithya Parishad since 2016.

== Personal life ==
Damodaran was born to Manjapra Kothanath Chirayil Kalathil Ramankutty Nair, a government employee by profession and Palakkad Pallatheri Kappadathu Puthanveettil Kalyanikkutty Amma on 1 August 1953 in Kochi. He was named after his paternal grandfather, according to the then-existing customs. He is deeply influenced by the fertile cultural landscape of his family place. He married Rajalakshmy (a native of North Paravoor), who was his classmate at Maharaja's College, on 7 June 1985. They have a daughter named Anagha (b. 1986). They are currently residing at Kochi, Kerala.

== Awards ==
These are some of the awards and achievements in the career life of R. K. Damodaran.

- Kerala Sangeetha Nataka Academy Kalasree Award - 2013
- Kunjunni Master Award for poetry - 2008
- Vaadya Mithra Award with Suvarna Mudra - 2006
- Kesava Poduval Smaraka Puraskaram - 2018
- Pavakulathamma Award -2018
- P.Gokulapalan Sankam Kala Group Award -2017
- Thirumantham Kunnu Neerajanam Award- 2014
- Parasseri Meen Kulathi Bhagavathi Temple's Bhadrapriya Award - 2014
- Paloor Sree Subrahmanya Swami Temple Award - 2014
- Akhila Bharathiya Ayappa Samithi Award - 2014
- Pattambi Sreethali Mahadeva Puraskaram- 2013
- Oottoor Unni Namboothirippadu Smaraka Puraskaram- 2011
- Kashypa Veda Research Foundation Award - 2010
- Mayilppeeli Award from Guruvayoor - 2010
- Thathvamasi Award - 2010
- Pambadi Pambumkavu Sree Nagaraja Puraskaram - 2009
- Jaycey Foundation Award - 2005
- Kerala Film Audience Council Award - 2004 & 2005
- Sangam Kala Group Award - 2003
- MTV Award and Smrithi Award - 2002
- Harivarasanam Award - 2001
- Drisya Award - 2000, 2002, 2004 & 2007
- Malayalam Tele Viewers Association Award - 2000
- Ayyappa Ganasree Award - 1994
- IPTA Award for the Best National Integration Song - 1992
- Nana Miniscreen Award - 1991
- Chottanikkara narayana Marar memorial NAVA NAARAAYAM award-2018
