= K. J. Joy =

- Also known as: Joy
- Born: K. J. Joy; 14 June 1946; Trichur, Cochin, India
- Died: 15 January 2024 (aged 77) Chennai, Tamil Nadu, India
- Genres: Carnatic music, Hindistani classical, Malayalam music, world music
- Occupation: Music director
- Instruments: Accordion, Musical keyboard
- Years active: 1975–1994

K. J. Joy (14 June 1946 – 15 January 2024) was an Indian composer and music director for the Malayalam film industry. He composed music for 71 films. He began his career as music director in 1975, after many years as an accordion recording artist for various music directors, primarily his mentor MS Viswanathan, who encouraged him to try his hand as a music director after realizing his potential. His first film was Love Letter (1975).

K. J. Joy died in Chennai on 15 January 2024, at the age of 77.

== Selected hit songs ==
Year	Song	Film	Lyricst	Rendered
1979	En Swaram	Anupallavi	Bichu Thirumala	KJ Yesudas
1979	Ore Raaga Pallavi	Anupallavi	Bichu Thirumala	KJ Yesudas, S Janaki
1978	Akkare Ikkare Ninnal	Itha Oru Theeram	Yusufali Kechery	KJ Yesudas
1980	Kasthoori Maanmizhi	Manushya Mrugam	Pappanamkodu Lakshmanan	KJ Yesudas
1980	Kurumozhi	Pappu	Bichu Thirumala	KJ Yesudas, S Janaki
1978	Oo Neeyente Jeevanil	Madaalasa	Yusufali Kechery	KJ Yesudas
1980	Swarnameeninte	Sarpam	Bichu Thirumala	KJ Yesudas, SP Balasubrahmanyam, P Susheela, Vani Jayaram
1981	Laavanya Devathayalle	Karimpoocha	Poovachal Khader	KJ Yesudas
1977	Ee Jeevithamoru Paaravaaram	Ivanente Priyaputhran	Mankombu Gopalakrishnan	KJ Yesudas
1980	Thechippoove Mizhithurakku	Hridhayam Paadunnu	Yusufali Kechery	KJ Yesudas, S Janaki
1984	Koodaram Vediyumee	Kurisuyudham	Poovachal Khadar	KJ Yesudas
