= List of Malayalam films of 1969 =

The following is a list of Malayalam films released in 1969.

Opening		Sl. No.	Film	Cast	Director	Music director	Notes
J A N	3	1	Anaachadanam	Prem Nazir, Sheela	M. Krishnan Nair	G. Devarajan	
J A N	10	2	Padichakallan	Prem Nazir, Adoor Bhasi	M. Krishnan Nair	G. Devarajan	
J A N	24	3	Veettumrugam	Sathyan, Madhu	P. Venu	G. Devarajan	
J A N	26	4	Aalmaram	Prem Nazir, Madhu, Sheela	A. Vincent	A. T. Ummer	
F E B	6	5	Kattukurangu	Sathyan, Jayabharathi, Sharada, K. PUmmer	P. Bhaskaran	G. Devarajan	
F E B	20	6	Janmabhoomi	Kottarakkara, Madhu	John Sankaramangalam	B. A. Chidambaranath	
F E B	27	7	Ballatha Pahayan	Prem Nazir, Vijayasree	T. S. Muthaiah	K. V. Job	
F E B	27	8	Aaryankavu Kollasangam	Keralasree Sunny, Khadeeja	R. Velappan Nair	B. A. Chidambaranath	
M A R	14	9	Mister Kerala	Prem Nazir, Sheela	G Viswanath	Vijayakrishnamoorthy	
M A R	20	10	Rahasyam	Prem Nazir, Sheela	J. Sasikumar	B. A. Chidambaranath	
A P R	5	11	Soosi	Prem Nazir, Sharada	Kunchacko	G. Devarajan	
A P R	5	12	Adimakal	Sathyan, Jayabharathy, Prem Nazir, Sharada	K. S. Sethumadhavan	G. Devarajan	
M A Y	16	13	Kannur Deluxe	Prem Nazir, Adoor Bhasi, Sheela, K. PUmmer	A. B. Raj	V. Dakshinamoorthy	
J U N	20	14	Nurse	Vijayasree, Raghavan	Thikkurissi	M. B. Sreenivasan	
J U L	10	15	Ardharathiri	Internet Movie Database	Sambasiva Rao		
J U L	20	16	Sandhya	Sathyan, Sharada	Dr. Vasan	M. S. Baburaj	
J U L	25	17	Kadalpalam	Sathyan, K. PUmmer, Prem nazir, Sheela, Jayabharathy	K. S. Sethumadhavan	Devarajan	
A U G	15	18	Vilakuranja Manushyan	Prem Nazir, Madhu	M. A. Rajendran	Pukazhenthi	
A U G	15	19	Mooladhanam	Sathyan, Jayabharathy, Sharada, Prem Nazir	P. Bhaskaran	G. Devarajan	
A U G	22	20	Kallichellamma	Prem Nazir, Madhu, Sheela	P. Bhaskaran	K. Raghavan	
A U G	23	21	Kuruthykkalam	Sathyan, Madhu	A. K. Sahadevan	Jaya Vijaya	
A U G	26	22	Jwala	Prem Nazir, Sheela, Sharada	M. Krishnan Nair	G. Devarajan	
S E P	17	23	Poojapushpam	Prem Nazir, Sheela, Vijayasree	Thikkurissy Sukumaran Nair	V. Dakshinamoorthy	
S E P	19	24	Vilakkapetta Bendhangal	Jayabharathy, Sathyan, Prem Nazir, Sharada	M. S. Mani	A. T. Ummer	
O C T	8	25	Chattambikkavala	Sathyan, Srividya	N. Sankaran Nair	B. A. Chidambaranath	
O C T	14	26	Urangatha Sundary	Sathyan, Jayabharathy	P. Subramaniam	G. Devarajan	
O C T	24	27	Nadhi	Prem Nazir, Sharada	A. Vincent	G. Devarajan	
O C T	31	28	Velliyazhcha	Sathyan, Sharada, Madhu	M. M. Nesan	M. S. Baburaj	
N O V	21	29	Danger Biscuit	Prem Nazir, Vijayasree, K. P Ummer, Sheela	A. B. Raj	V. Dakshinamoorthy	
N O V	28	30	Koottukudumbam	Sathyan, Sheela, Prem Nazir, Sharada	K. S. Sethumadhavan	G. Devarajan	
D E C	10	31	Virunnukari	Prem Nazir, Madhu, Sheela, K. P Ummer	P. Venu	M. S. Baburaj	
D E C	18	32	Rest House	Prem Nazir, Sheela	J. Sasikumar	M. K. Arjunan	
D E C	26	33	Kumara Sambhavam	Gemini Ganesan, Padmini	P. Subramaniam	G. Devarajan	
