= Danger Biscuit =

- Directed by: A. B. Raj
- Written by: V. Valsala; S. L. Puram Sadanandan (dialogues)
- Screenplay by: S. L. Puram Sadanandan
- Produced by: T. E. Vasudevan
- Starring: Prem Nazir; Sheela; Adoor Bhasi; N. Govindankutty; Sadhana; Paravoor Bharathan; Kottayam Chellappan; Sukumari
- Cinematography: C. Namasivayam
- Edited by: B. S. Mani
- Music by: V. Dakshinamoorthy
- Production company: Jaya Maruthi
- Distributed by: Jaya Maruthi
- Release date: 21 November 1969
- Country: India
- Language: Malayalam

Danger Biscuit is a 1969 Indian Malayalam-language film, directed by A. B. Raj and produced by T. E. Vasudevan. The film stars Prem Nazir, Sheela, Adoor Bhasi, N. Govindankutty, Sadhana, Paravoor Bharathan and Kottayam Chellappan in the lead roles. The film had musical score by V. Dakshinamoorthy.

Balachandran, an undercover policeman, is tasked with investigating the smuggling of gold biscuits, which leads him to shocking discoveries.

== Cast ==
- Prem Nazir
- N. Govindankutty
- Sadhana
- Paravoor Bharathan
- Kottayam Chellappan
- K. P. Ummer as Dr. Sudhakaran
- G. K. Pillai
- C. A. Balan
- Abbas
- Sankaradi
- Adoor Bhasi
- Sukumari as Muthu Lakshmi
- Sheela as Dr. Aswathi

== Soundtrack ==
The music was composed by V. Dakshinamoorthy and the lyrics were written by Sreekumaran Thampi.

No.	Song	Singers	Lyrics	Raga(s)
1	"Ashwathinakshathrame"	P. Jayachandran	Sreekumaran Thampi	
2	"Kaamukan Vannaal"	S. Janaki, Chorus	Sreekumaran Thampi	
3	"Kannil Kannil"	S. Janaki	Sreekumaran Thampi	Valaji
4	"Manava manamoru"	P. Leela	Sreekumaran Thampi	
5	"Parayaan Enikku Naanam"	S. Janaki	Sreekumaran Thampi	
6	"Thamasaa Nadiyude"	P. Leela	Sreekumaran Thampi	
7	"Utharaaswayamvaram"	K. J. Yesudas	Sreekumaran Thampi	Kharaharapriya
