= Adat Shiva Temple =

Hindu temple in India

- അടാട്ട് ശിവക്ഷേത്രം
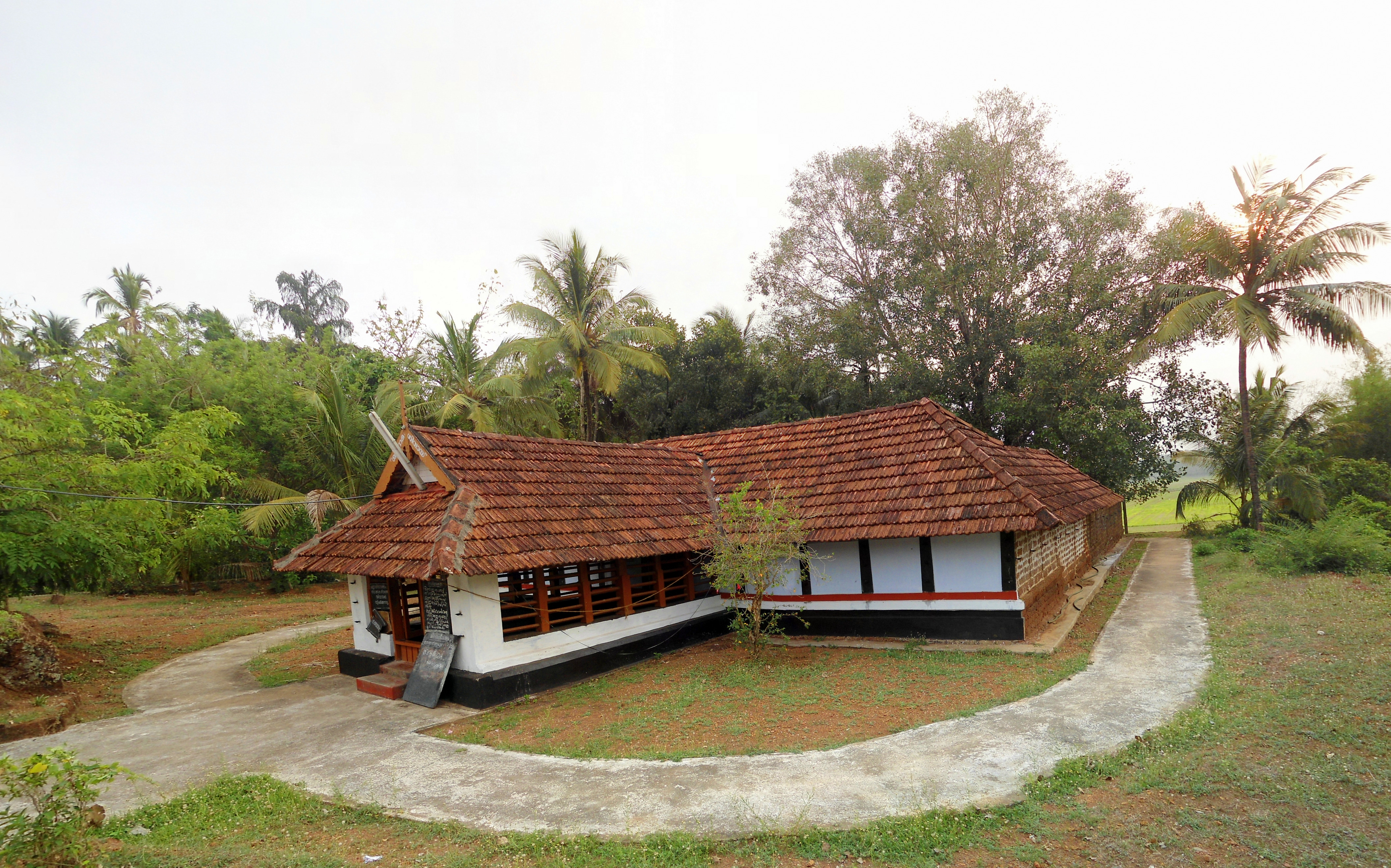
- Nalambalam East side

- Shiva Temple, Adat, Thrissur, Kerala

Religion
- Affiliation: Hinduism
- District: Thrissur
- Deity: Shiva; Maha Vishnu
- Festivals: Maha Shivaratri, Ashtamirohini

Location
- Location: Adat
- State: Kerala
- Country: India
- Interactive map of Adat Shiva Temple
- Coordinates: 10.544279°N 76.139841°E

Architecture
- Type: Kerala style
- Completed: Not known

Specifications
- Temple: Two
- Monument: 2
- Elevation: 29.85 m (98 ft)

Adat Shiva Temple is located at Adat village in Thrissur district. The temple has two main deities, Sri Parameswara and Maha Vishnu. Both deities having separate temple complexes. Lord Sri Parameswara facing east and Maha Vishnu is facing west. It is believed that Shiva temple is one of the 108 Shiva temples of Kerala and is installed by sage Parasurama dedicated to Shiva.

== Adat Vishnu Temple ==
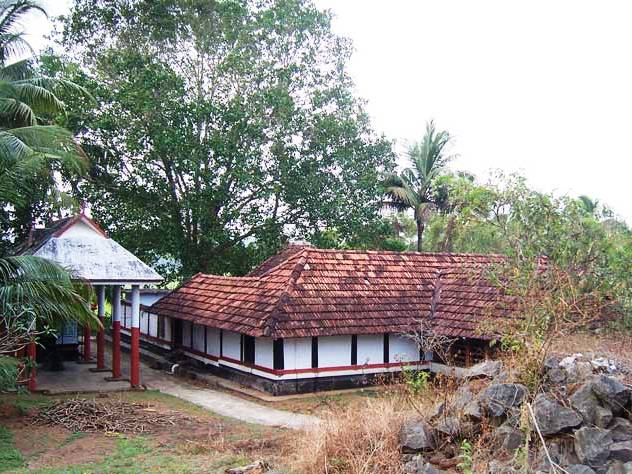
Adat Vishnu Temple

There is a fascinating myth about the name of Adat and Adat Maha Vishnu Temple. This is associated with Kurur Mana House and mother (Kururamma). There was a boy who came to help Kururamma with her daily Guruvayoorappan puja. Waiting for the priest Vilwamangalam Swamiyaronce Kururamma saw that the boy who had come to help had eaten the offeringNaivedhya and she closed the boy in a pot. Later they came to the conclusion that this boy is really Guruvayurappan and from then onwards the place became known as Adat in the sense that the pot was "closed".

== See also ==
- 108 Shiva Temples
- Temples of Kerala
