= Madampu Kunjukuttan =

Indian writer (1941–2021)

Madampu Sankaran Namboothiri
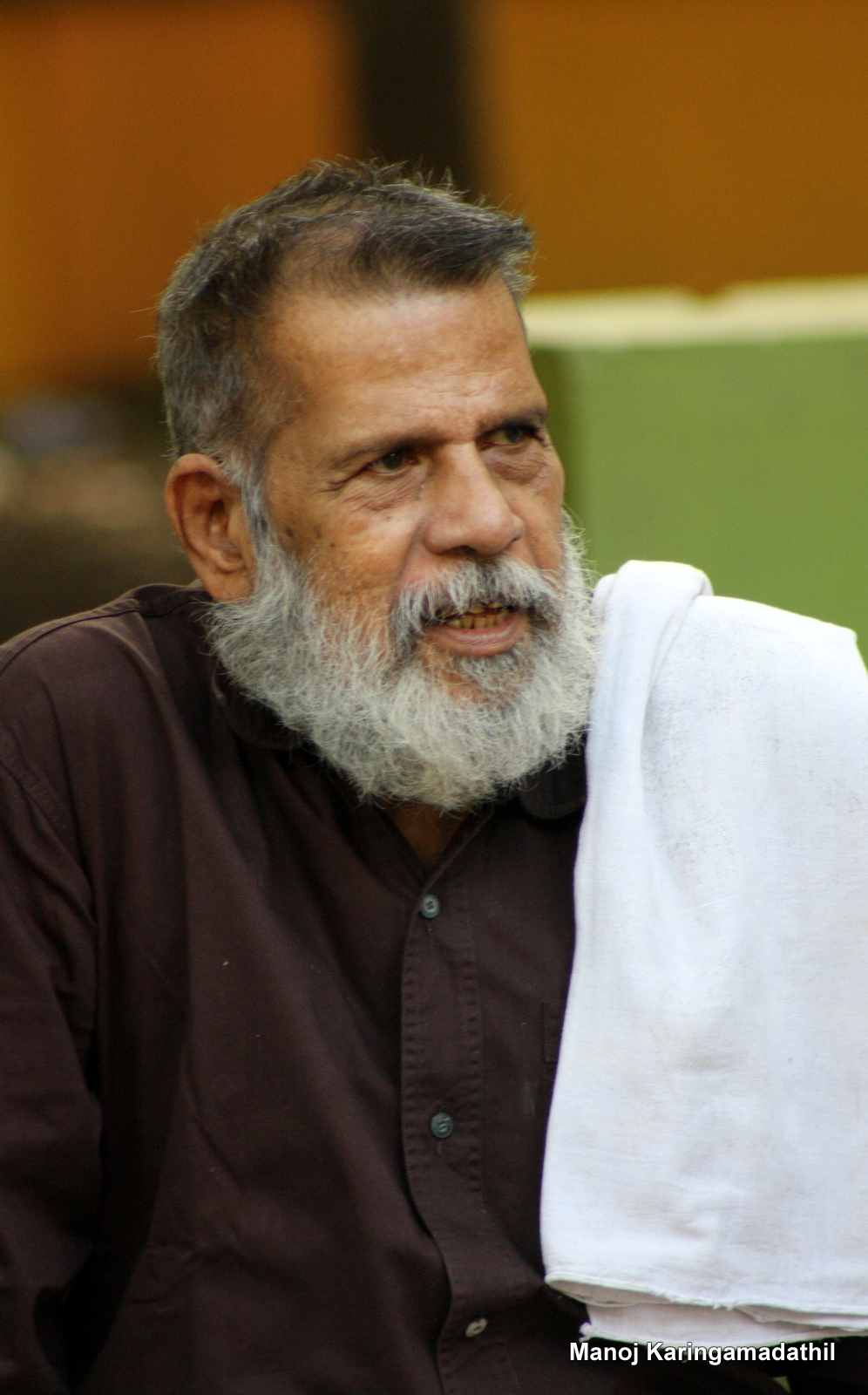
- Born: 23 June 1941; Kiralur, Thrissur, Kerala, India
- Died: 11 May 2021 (aged 79); Thrissur, Thrissur, Kerala, India
- Occupations: Novelist; short story writer; screenplay writer; priest; teacher; actor
- Spouse: Savithri Antharjanam
- Writing career
- Pen name: Madampu Kunjukuttan
- Genres: Novel, Short story
- Subject: Social aspects
- Notable awards: National Film Award for Best Screenplay writer in 2000, Kerala Sahitya Academy Award

Madampu Sankaran Namboothiri (23 June 1941 − 11 May 2021), popularly known as Madampu Kunjukuttan, was a Malayalam actor, author and screenplay writer.

== Background and personal life ==
Kunjukuttan was born in Kiralur village of Thrissur District on 23 June 1941. He studied Sanskrit, Hasthyaayurvedam (treatment of elephants), worked as teacher for Sanskrit at Kodungalloor and was also a priest in a nearby temple. Madampu also worked for Ākāsha Vāṇī (All India Radio). He was married to Savithri Antharjanam and had two daughters, Jaseena Madampu and Haseena Madampu.

== Career ==
His noted works includes Aswathamavu, Mahaprasthanam, Avighnamasthu, Bhrashtu, Entharo Mahanubhavulu, Nishadam, Pathalam, Aryavarthanam, Amrithasya Puthrah and Thonnyasam. He also wrote screenplays for the movies 'Makalkku', 'Gourisankaram', 'Saphalam', 'Karunam' and 'Deshadanam'. Kunjukuttan's novel Mahaprasthanam won the Kerala Sahitya Akademi Award for Best Novel in 1983. He won the National Film Award for Best Screenplay in the year 2000 for the Malayalam film Karunam, directed by Jayaraj. He contested in the Assembly election in 2001 from Kodungallur on a BJP ticket, but did not win. In 2003, he won the Ashdod International Film Award for Best Screenplay for the film Parinamam (The Change) directed by P.Venu. He received Sanjayan Award in 2014. He was famous for being the host of TV show E4 Elephant along with Sreekumar Arookutty on Kairali TV. He died on 11 May 2021, at a hospital in Thrissur, succumbing to COVID-19 related complications.

== Filmography ==
- Ashwathama (1978)
- Aaraam Thampuran (1997)
- Purushardham (1986)
- Agnisakshi (1999)
- Shantham (2000)
- Karunam (2000)
- Kattu Vannu Vilichappol (2001)
- Maargam (2003)
- Parinamam (The Change) (2003)
- Agninakshatram (2004)
- Rasikan (2004)
- Vadakkumnadhan (2006)
- Aanachandam (2006)
- Veeralipattu (2007)
- Adayalangal (2008)
- Shalabam (2008)
- Orma Mathram (2011)
- Arike (2012)
- Aattakatha (2013)
- Chirakodinja Kinavukal (2015)
- Utyopyile Rajavu (2015)
- Shyamaragam (2020)

== Television ==
- E4 Elephant
