= Taxi Car =

1972 film by P. Venu

- Promotional poster
- Directed by: P. Venu
- Written by: Uma Radhakrishnan; P. Venu (dialogues)
- Screenplay by: P. Venu
- Produced by: P. Venu
- Starring: Prem Nazir; Sadhana; Vijayasree; Vincent
- Cinematography: P. B. Mani
- Edited by: G. Kalyana Sundaram
- Music by: R. K. Shekhar
- Production company: Anupama Films
- Release date: 14 April 1972 (India)
- Country: India
- Language: Malayalam

Taxi Car is a 1972 Indian Malayalam- language detective film, directed and produced by P. Venu. The film stars Prem Nazir, Sadhana, Vijayasree and Vincent in the lead roles. The film had musical score by R. K. Shekhar.

This film is a sequel to the Venu's 1971 film C.I.D. Nazir.

== Premise ==
A counterfeiting racket operating in Kerala is the rise. CID Nazir is tasked with bringing the perpetrators to justice.

== Cast ==
- Prem Nazir as CID Nazir
- Vidhubala as Geetha
- Vijayasree as Rani
- Vincent as Vincent
- Adoor Bhasi as Nambiar, Bhasi (double role)
- Hari
- Jose Prakash as Shivaram
- Prema as Kamalam, Nambiar's wife
- Shobha as Baby Shobha
- Sreelatha Namboothiri as Sreelatha
- T. S. Muthaiah as Father Frederick
- Bahadoor as Nadathara Rajappan
- Kaduvakulam Antony
- Kunchan
- P. R. Menon as Keshava Pilla
- Pala Thankam

== Soundtrack ==
The music was composed by R. K. Shekhar and the lyrics were written by Sreekumaran Thampi.

No.	Song	Singers	Lyrics	Length (m:ss)
1	"Kalppanakalthan Kalppakathoppil"	Sadanandan, Sudha Varma	Sreekumaran Thampi	
2	"Praasaada Chandrika"	P. Jayachandran	Sreekumaran Thampi	
3	"Sankalpavrindaavanathil"	K. J. Yesudas	Sreekumaran Thampi	
4	"Swapnathil Vannaval"	P. Madhuri	Sreekumaran Thampi	
5	"Thaamarappoo Naanichu"	K. P. Brahmanandan	Sreekumaran Thampi	
