= M. P. Parameswaran =

Indian nuclear engineer and educationist (1935–2026)

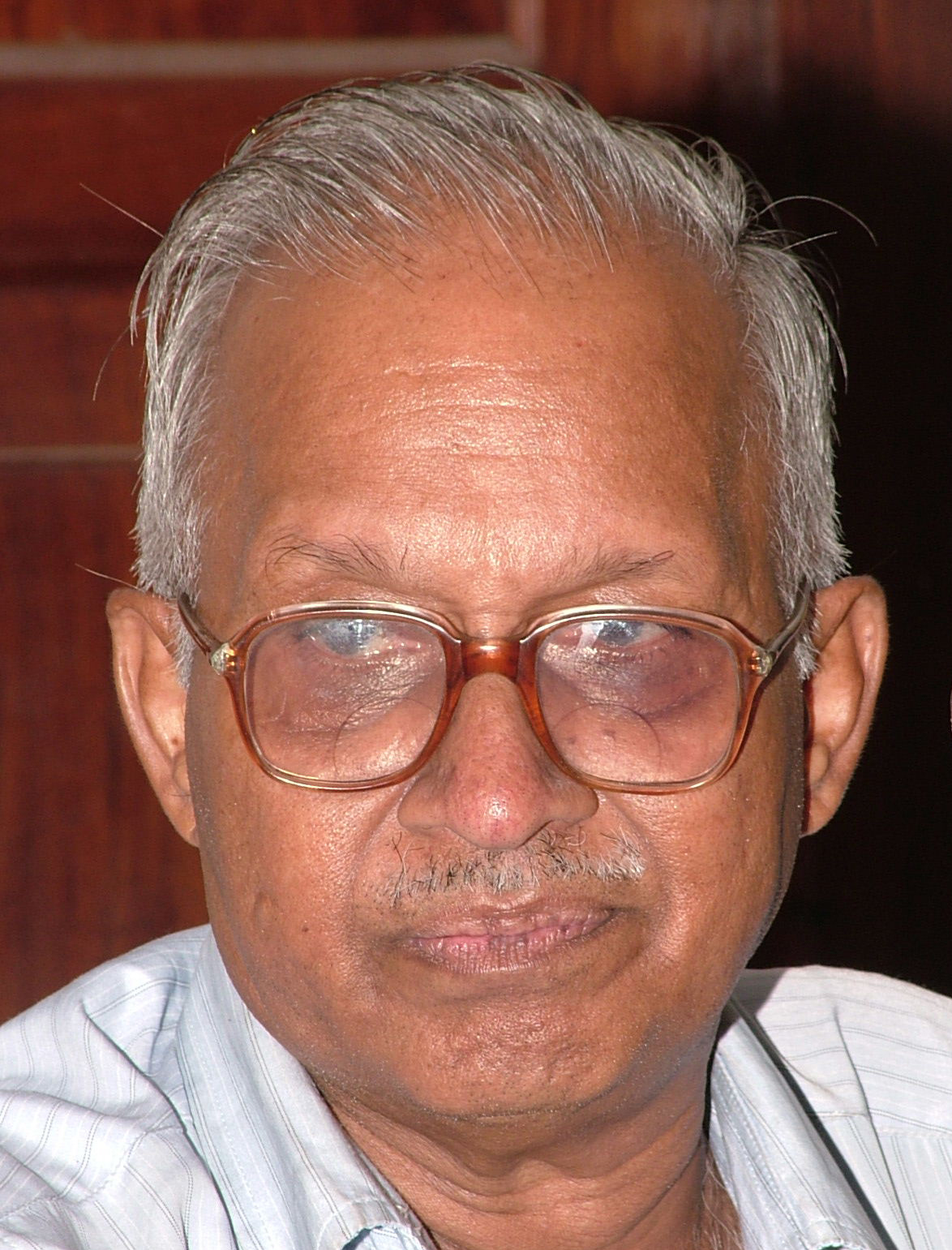
- Born: 18 January 1935; Kiralur, Kingdom of Cochin, India
- Died: 11 August 2026 (aged 91); Thrissur, Kerala, India
- Education: College of Engineering, Trivandrum; Moscow Power Engineering Institute
- Known for: Indian Nuclear Programme; Operation Smiling Buddha
- Awards: Books for Neoliterates Award (1962); Basic and Cultural Literature Award (1964); Children's Literature Award (1984)
- Scientific career
- Fields: Nuclear Engineering
- Workplaces: Bhabha Atomic Research Centre; Department of Atomic Energy

M. P. Parameswaran (18 January 1935 – 11 August 2026) was an Indian nuclear engineer and educationist, who played an important role in the Indian nuclear programme. In 2022, he was honoured with Kerala Sree Award, third highest civilian award given by the Government of Kerala.

== Education ==
M. P. Parameswaran was born in Kiralur on 18 January 1935. In 1956, he studied in Namboothiri Vidyalayam, Church Mission Society Higher Secondary School, Thrissur and completed pre-degree course from St. Thomas College, Thrissur, he received a Bachelor's degree in Engineering from the College of Engineering, Trivandrum, Kerala. He then joined Bhabha Atomic Research Centre (BARC) in Bombay and continued there till 1975. From 1969 to 1973 he worked as the Assistant Director of the State Institute of Languages in Kerala, on a deputation from BARC. He got a PhD in Nuclear Engineering from the Moscow Power Engineering Institute in 1965.

== Indian science movement ==
During the 1970s, a people's science movement called Kerala Sasthra Sahithya Parishad (KSSP) was formed in Kerala and created a new movement among science teachers and science communicators in the state. He resigned from his job in 1975 to take part in the movement. Since then he was a full-time activist of the Kerala Sasthra Sahitya Parishad (KSSP). Under his leadership, the KSSP grew into a massive people’s movement and influenced science communicators all over the country.

== Kerala Sasthra Sahitya Parishad ==
After KSSP became a success in Kerala, M. P. Parameswaran took steps to enlarge the canvas at the national level. In 1987, as Convener of the National Organising Committee of the Bharat Jan Vigyan Jatha, a unique communication event for India – he significantly contributed to the conceptualisation, organisation and conduct of this massive communication experiment. He had also been instrumental in the setting up of the All India People's Science Network (AIPSN), a common platform of people science movements in India.

In 1990, he was instrumental in the organisation of the Bharat Gyan Vigyan Jatha in support of the National Literacy Mission Programme, which was organised from 2 October 1990 to 14 November 1990. This led to the formation of Bharat Gyan Vigyan Samiti (BGVS), which was responsible for the massive literacy campaign initiated in India.

== Contribution in science and technology ==
Parameswaran was a prolific writer, having written 29 popular science books in Malayalam and two in English. His books give a panoramic view of science. Radioactivity, atomic science, astronomy, mathematics, political science, social science, ecology - these are some of the varied subjects he has dealt with in his books. A vision of "A New World - A New India" guides his thoughts and actions. He was the recipient of two national awards, one for science popularisation and another for literacy. He wrote more than 300 articles in various periodicals. He has received Government of India awards for "Books for Neoliterates" (1962) and "Basic and Cultural Literature" (1964). He also received an Award for Children's Literature in 1982.

He was an active member of the Communist Party of India (Marxist) for 33 years, before being expelled for writing an ideological book 'Fourth World' which envisions a world based on decentralised democracy and an economic production that is detached from consumerism. The party viewed it as a rejection of Marxist principles.

As Assistant Director of Kerala Institute of Languages, he was instrumental in designing the layout for Malayalam keyboard for typewriters, which was later adopted in the inscript layout for computers.

In 2007, he acted in a Malayalam movie named AKG about the Communist leader A K Gopalan in which M. P. Parameswaran donned the role of Kerala's first Chief Minister E. M. S. Namboodiripad.

Parameswaran published the book Janakeeya Sasthra Prasthanam in 2008. The third edition of the book was recently published.

== Death ==
Parameswaran died on 11 August 2026, at the age of 91.
