= Boy Friend (1975 film) =

1975 film

- Directed by: P. Venu
- Written by: Sasikala Venu; P. Venu (dialogues)
- Screenplay by: P. Venu
- Produced by: P. Venu
- Starring: Sudheer; Vidhubala; Pattom Sadan; Vincent
- Cinematography: Vipin Das
- Edited by: G. Kalyana Sundaram
- Music by: G. Devarajan
- Production company: Anupama Films
- Distributed by: Anupama Films
- Release date: 13 June 1975
- Country: India
- Language: Malayalam

Boy Friend is a 1975 Indian Malayalam film, directed and produced by P. Venu. The film stars Vincent, Rani Chandra, Pattom Sadan and Sudheer in the lead roles. The film has musical score by G. Devarajan.

== Cast ==
- K. P. Ummer
- Vidhubala
- Sudheer
- Vincent
- Rani Chandra
- Ravi Menon
- Sukumari
- Adoor Bhasi
- Pattom Sadan
- Peethambaran
- Sreelatha Namboothiri
- Surendran
- Girijan
- Jameela Malik
- Kuthiravattam Pappu
- Lissy
- Mallika Sukumaran
- Reena
- S. P. Pillai
- Sadasivan
- Sadhana
- Swapna
- Thankappan

== Soundtrack ==
The music was composed by G. Devarajan.

No.	Song	Singers	Lyrics	Length (m:ss)
1	"Anuraagathin" (F)	P. Madhuri	P. Venu	
2	"Anuraagathin" (M)	K. J. Yesudas	P. Venu	
3	"Jaatharoopini"	Chorus, Sreekanth	Sreekumaran Thampi	
4	"Kaalam Poojicha"	Sreekumaran Thampi	Sreekumaran Thampi	
5	"Maari Poomaari"	P. Jayachandran	Sreekumaran Thampi	
6	"Oh My Boy Friend"	P. Jayachandran, P. Madhuri, Padmanabhan	Sreekumaran Thampi	
