= Puranattukara =

- Census Town
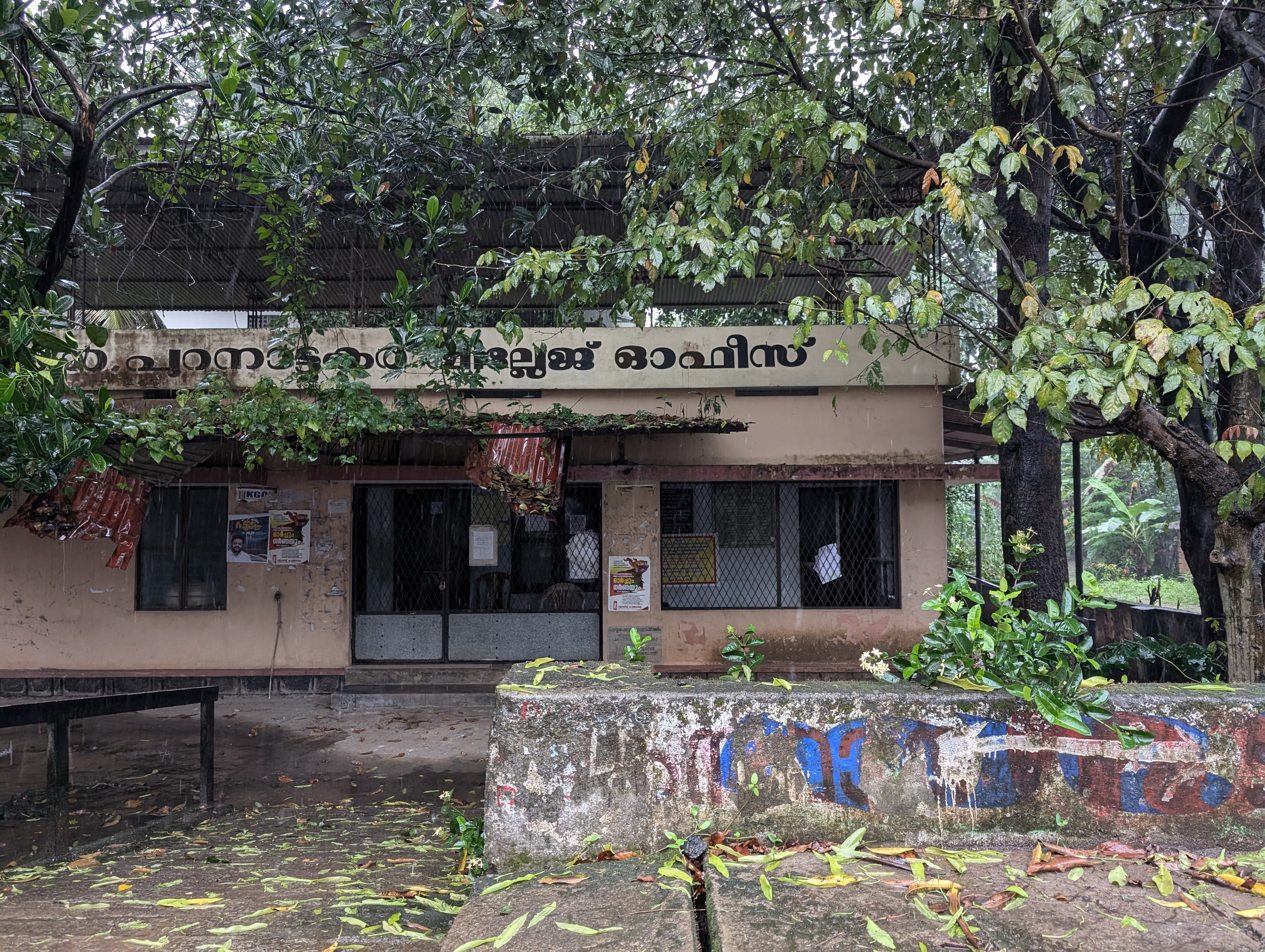
- Puranattukara village office

- Location in Kerala, India Puranattukara (India)
- Coordinates: 10.552785°N 76.161296°E
- Country: India
- State: Kerala
- District: Thrissur

Government
  - Type: Adat Panchayat

Population (2011)
  - Total: 10,655

Languages
  - Official: Malayalam, English
- Time zone: UTC+5:30 (IST)
- PIN: 680551
- Vehicle registration: KL-08

Puranattukara is a census town in Thrissur district in the Indian state of Kerala.

== Demographics ==
As of 2001 India census, Puranattukara had a population of 9595. Males constitute 48% of the population and females 52%. Puranattukara has an average literacy rate of 85%, higher than the national average of 59.5%: male literacy is 86%, and female literacy is 83%. In Puranattukara, 10% of the population is under 6 years of age.

== Educational institutions ==
Puranattukara village is home to a number of educational institutions like the Rashtriya Sanskrit Sansthan, Kendriya Vidyalaya, Sri ramakrishna math school, Sri Sarada Girls Higher Secondary School. Puranattukara is part of Adat Grama panjayat.

== gallery ==
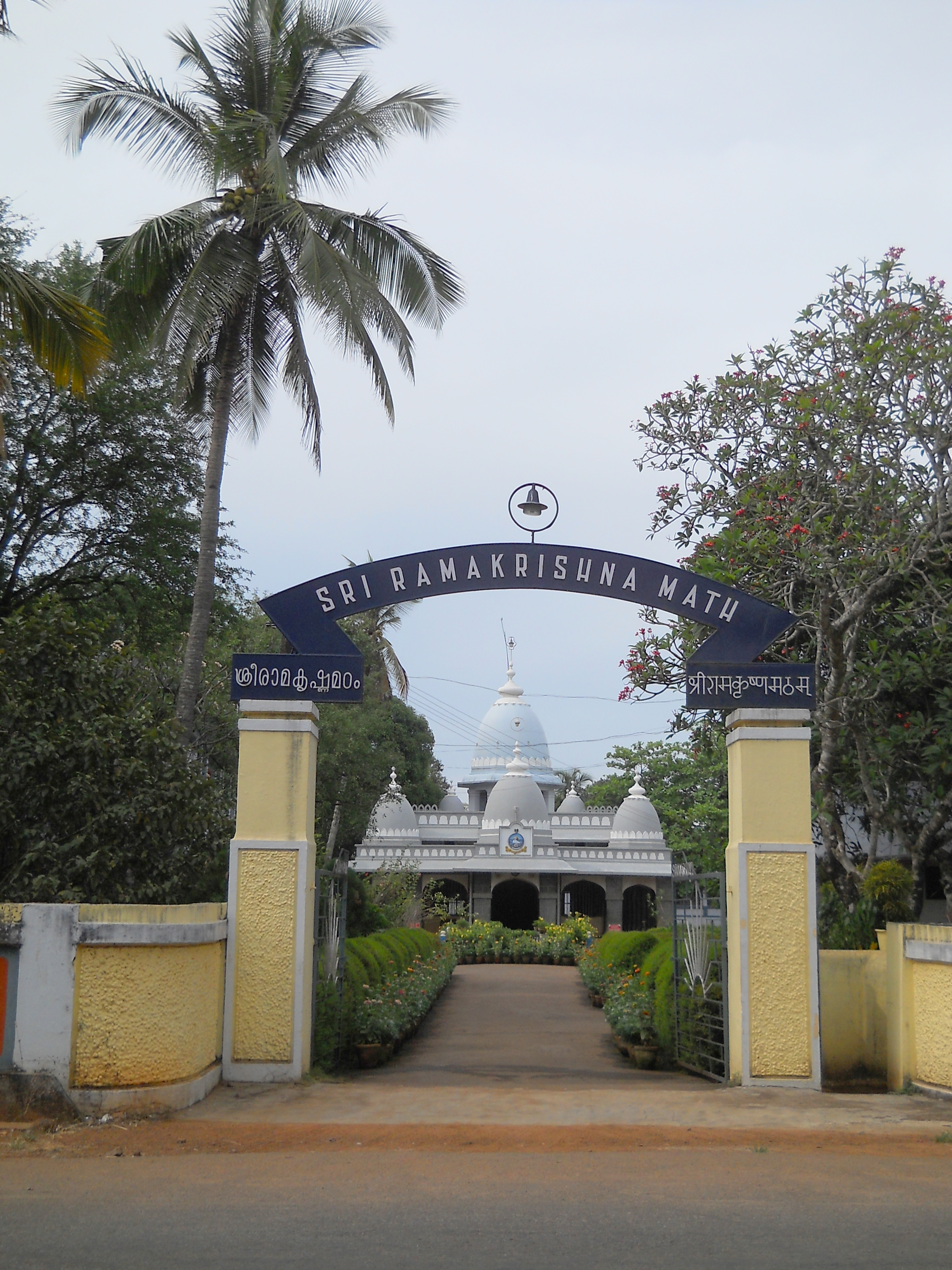
Sri ramakrishna math puranattukara
