= Veettumrugam =

- Directed by: P. Venu
- Written by: G. Sethunath
- Produced by: P. Sukumaran; G. Arjunan
- Starring: Sathyan; Madhu; Sharada; Jayabharathi
- Cinematography: C. J. Mohan
- Edited by: G. Venkittaraman
- Music by: G. Devarajan
- Production company: Vishnu Films
- Distributed by: Vishnu Films
- Release date: 24 January 1969
- Country: India
- Language: Malayalam

Veettumrugam (English: House Pet) is a 1969 Indian Malayalam-language film directed by P. Venu and produced by P. Sukumaran and G. Arjunan. The film stars Sathyan, Madhu, Sharada and Jayabharathi in the lead roles. It features a musical score by G. Devarajan.

== Cast ==
- Sathyan
- Madhu
- Sharada
- Jayabharathi
- Adoor Bhasi
- P. J. Antony
- Sankaradi
- Shobha
- T. R. Omana
- Raghavan
- Janardanan
- Kaduvakulam Antony
- Kamaladevi
- Nellikode Bhaskaran
- Radhamani

== Soundtrack ==
The music was composed by G. Devarajan and the lyrics were written by P. Bhaskaran.

No.	Song	Singers	Lyrics	Length (m:ss)
1	"Kadankadha Parayunna"	A. M. Rajah, B. Vasantha	P. Bhaskaran	
2	"Kanneerkkadalil"	P. Susheela	P. Bhaskaran	
3	"Manmadha Soudhathil"	K. J. Yesudas	P. Bhaskaran	
4	"Manmadha Soudhathil"	P. Jayachandran	P. Bhaskaran	
5	"Yaathrayaakkunnu Sakhi"	K. J. Yesudas	P. Bhaskaran	
