= Prethangalude Thazhvara =

1973 film by P. Venu

- Poster
- Directed by: P. Venu
- Written by: P. Venu
- Produced by: P. Venu
- Starring: Raghavan, Vijayasree; Thikkurissy Sukumaran Nair; Jose Prakash; Bahadoor
- Music by: G. Devarajan
- Production company: Anupama Films
- Distributed by: Anupama Films
- Release date: 28 September 1973
- Country: India
- Language: Malayalam

Prethangalude Thazhvara is a 1973 Indian Malayalam-language film, directed and produced by P. Venu. The film stars Raghavan, Bahadoor, Vijayasree, Jose Prakash and Radhamani. The film was scored by G. Devarajan.

== Cast ==
- Raghavan
- Vijayasree
- Radhamani
- Bahadoor
- Adoor Bhasi
- Thikkurissy Sukumaran Nair
- Jose Prakash
- Sreelatha Namboothiri

== Soundtrack ==
The music was composed by G. Devarajan with lyrics by Sreekumaran Thampi.

No.	Song	Singers	Lyrics	Length (m:ss)
1	"Aathire Thiruvaathire"	P. Madhuri	Sreekumaran Thampi	
2	"Kalloliniyude"	K. J. Yesudas	Sreekumaran Thampi	
3	"Malayala Bhashathan"	P. Jayachandran	Sreekumaran Thampi	
4	"Muthu Mehboobe"	P. B. Sreenivas, Sathi	Sreekumaran Thampi	
5	"Ragatharangini"	K. J. Yesudas	Sreekumaran Thampi	
6	"Suprabhaathamaayi"	P. Madhuri	Sreekumaran Thampi	
