= C.I.D. Nazir =

1971 film by P. Venu

- Promotional poster
- Directed by: P. Venu
- Written by: Uma Devi; P. J. Antony (dialogues)
- Screenplay by: P. Venu
- Produced by: P. Venu
- Starring: Prem Nazir; Jayabharathi; Adoor Bhasi; Jose Prakash
- Cinematography: C. J. Mohan
- Edited by: G. Venkittaraman
- Music by: M. K. Arjunan
- Production company: Anupama Films
- Release date: 14 April 1971 (India)
- Running time: 142 minutes
- Country: India
- Language: Malayalam

C.I.D. Nazir is a 1971 Indian Malayalam -language detective film, directed and produced by P. Venu. The film stars Prem Nazir, Jayabharathi, Adoor Bhasi and Jose Prakash in the lead roles. The film was scored by M. K. Arjunan.

The film is considered to be one of the first detective movies in Malayalam. It was inspired by the 1968 Kannada film Jedara Bale which was itself based on the James Bond Franchise. The film later had a sequel titled Taxi Car (1972). The 1994 superhit CID Unnikrishnan B.A., B.Ed. was made as a homage to this film.

== Premise ==
When CID officer Chandran, who is working on a tedious case, is murdered, officer Nazir is called in to take over his case and also nab Chandran's murderers.

== Cast ==
- Prem Nazir as CID Nazir
- Jayabharathi as Shanthi
- Adoor Bhasi as Bhasi
- Jose Prakash
- Sreelatha Namboothiri as Sreelatha
- Francis
- Raghavan
- T. S. Muthaiah
- Mancheri Chandran
- Rajan
- Bahadoor
- Girish Kumar
- K. P. Ummer
- Nellikode Bhaskaran
- Sadhana as Lovely/Radha

== Soundtrack ==
All lyrics are written by Sreekumaran Thampi; all music is composed by M. K. Arjunan.

No.	Title	Artist(s)	Length
1.	"Chandralekha Kinnari"	K. J. Yesudas
2.	"Neela Nisheedhini"	K. P. Brahmanandan
3.	"Nin Maniyarayile"	P. Jayachandran
4.	"Pranayasarovarame"	S. Janaki
5.	"Sankalpathin Thankaradhathil"	P. Jayachandran, Sudha Varma
6.	"Thenmala Poyi Varumpam"	P. Leela, K. P. Chandramohan

== Box office ==
The film was a commercial success.
