= Udhyogastha =

- Directed by: P. Venu
- Written by: K. G. Sethunath
- Screenplay by: P. Venu
- Produced by: P. K. Devadas; P. S. Das
- Starring: Prem Nazir; Sathyan; Madhu; Sharada; KP Ummer
- Cinematography: C. J. Mohan
- Edited by: K. D. George
- Music by: M. S. Baburaj
- Production company: Geethanjali
- Distributed by: Geethanjali
- Release date: 14 April 1967
- Country: India
- Language: Malayalam

Udhyogastha (transl. The Working Woman) is a 1967 Indian Malayalam film, directed by P. Venu and produced by P. K. Devadas and P. S. Das. The film stars Prem Nazir, Sathyan, Madhu and Sharada in the lead roles. The film was scored by M. S. Baburaj.

== Plot ==
Vimala is the eldest daughter of a poor family. Her aged father is sick and is not receiving his pension. She has two grown-up siblings; Gopi and Malathy, who have scant regard for their sister's troubles in putting food on the table and educating them. Vimala is a tuition teacher who runs the house with the money she gets from teaching students. Her siblings are spoilt, do not help her in any way, and keep asking her for money. Malathy is incredibly spiteful, doesn't help in the house, and spends her time reading magazines, which her sister cannot afford. Vimala gets it in her head that her adult siblings have no mother, so she must mother them and look after them. Soon, she gets a good job as a typist in an office, but office politics and toxicity troubles her. Her boss, Hari, is a good man and helps her out when the head office clerk, Swami, attempts to withhold her salary and makes her work late on purpose.

Vimala has an evil aunt who is constantly gossiping about her. One day, she sees Vimala talking to Rajasekharan and tells Malathy that Vimala is flirting with a man. Malathy instantly believes her and informs her family, who also instantly believe Malathy and accuse Vimala of being a woman of questionable morals. Vimala then reveals that Rajasekharan is interested in marrying Malathy and has met her several times to ask for her hand in marriage. Vimala's family is overjoyed as Rajasekharan is an engineer with a good job. They instantly agree to the wedding. Rajasekharan understands the plight of his fiancée's family and wants a simple wedding ceremony at the temple. But Malathy throws a fit and tells Vimala she wants a lavish wedding. Vimala agrees and borrows money to organize the wedding.

Soon, Malathy is pregnant, and Vimala borrows money yet again and takes leave from the office to care for her during the last trimester and after the birth of her child. Meanwhile, Gopi asks Vimala for money to go to Madras for a job that someone has promised him. Vimala borrows yet again to give him the money. Gopi has a rich girlfriend to whom he lies about being from a wealthy family. He meets his girlfriend in Madras and spends all the money there.

Vimala's boss drops her home one day after she has had to work late. When Vimala's aunt sees this, she tells Malathy that her sister is having an affair with her boss. Malathy relates this to her dad, who instantly believes her and leaves the house with Malathy in a huff. Malathy also informs Gopi, who also believes her.

Unable to deal with her ungrateful family, Vimala commits suicide.

== Cast ==
- Prem Nazir as Gopi
- Sathyan as Rajan
- Madhu as Rajasekharan
- Sharada as Vimala
- Sukumari as Janakiyamma
- Rajasree
- Adoor Bhasi as Swami
- Shobha
- T. S. Muthaiah as Menon
- K. P. Ummer as Hari
- Kaduvakulam Antony as Sankunni
- Lakshmi (Old)
- Mala Shantha as Malathy
- Nellikode Bhaskaran as Khader
- Ravi Vamanapuram
- Sreedharan
- Vijayanirmala as Sujatha

== Soundtrack ==
The music was composed by M. S. Baburaj and the lyrics were written by Yusufali Kechery.

No.	Song	Singers	Lyrics	Length (m:ss)
1	"Anuraagagaanam Pole"	P. Jayachandran	Yusufali Kechery	
2	"Ezhuthiyathaaraanu"	K. J. Yesudas, S. Janaki	Yusufali Kechery	
3	"Kalichirimaaraatha"	K. J. Yesudas	Yusufali Kechery	
4	"Maankidaavine"	S. Janaki	Yusufali Kechery	
5	"Sharanam Nin Charanam"	S. Janaki	Yusufali Kechery	
6	"Thankam Vegam" (Raariraaro)	S. Janaki	Yusufali Kechery	
