= Swaralaya Kairali Yesudas Award =

Award for music artists in recognition to their outstanding performance based in India

The Swaralaya Kairali Yesudas Award, usually referred to as Yesudas Award, is an award for music artists in recognition of their outstanding performance. The award is instituted jointly by Swaralaya, an organization that promotes music, and Kairali Channel, based in Trivandrum, India. Awards have been given annually since 2000. K. J. Yesudas presents the awards at a Gandharva Sandhya every January.

== Swaralaya-Kairali-Yesudas awardees ==
Year	Swaralaya-Kairali-Yesudas award
2016	Vidyasagar
2012	M. Jayachandran
2011	M. G. Sreekumar
2010	Shreya Ghoshal
2009	Sujatha Mohan
2008	Kavita Krishnamurthy
2007	Shankar Mahadevan
2006	A.R. Rahman
2005	Sonu Nigam
2004	Hariharan
2003	K. S. Chithra
2002	Asha Bhosle
2001	S. P. Balasubrahmanyam
2000	P. Jayachandran

== Special Jury awardees ==
Year	Special Jury award
2012	T. M. Soundararajan
2009	M. K. Arjunan
2008	M. S. Viswanathan
2007	V. Dakshinamoorthy
2006	K. Raghavan
2005	P. Susheela
2004	Santha P. Nair
2003	P. Leela
2002	Manna Dey
2001	S. Janaki
2000

== Swaralaya-Kairali-Yesudas Legendary awardees ==
Swaralaya-Kairali-Yesudas Legendary award was introduced in 2010 in order to honour the legends in music.

Year	Swaralaya-Kairali-Yesudas Legendary award
2010	Lata Mangeshkar

== See also ==
- Yesudas
