= Ariyappedatha Rahasyam =

- Directed by: P. Venu
- Screenplay by: P. Venu
- Produced by: Koshi Ninan; John Philip; Koshi Philip; Raji George
- Starring: Prem Nazir; Jayan; Jayabharathi; Jose Prakash
- Cinematography: Sivan
- Edited by: K. Narayanan
- Music by: M. K. Arjunan
- Production company: Sargadhara Cine Arts
- Distributed by: Sargadhara Cine Arts
- Release date: 9 January 1981
- Country: India
- Language: Malayalam

Ariyappedatha Rahasyam is a 1981 Indian Malayalam film, directed by P. Venu and produced by Koshi Ninan, John Philip, Koshi Philip and Raji George. The film stars Prem Nazir, Jayan, Jayabharathi and Jose Prakash in the lead roles. The film has musical score by M. K. Arjunan. The film was a hit.

== Cast ==
- Prem Nazir as Vijayan
- Jayan as Raghu
- Jayabharathi as Geetha
- Jose Prakash as Sreedharan Thampi
- Prameela as Santha
- Janardhanan as Pappan
- Mala Aravindan as Bobby
- N. Govindankutty as Gopi
- Alummoodan as Andrews
- Kanakadurga as Sarojam
- Poojappura Ravi as Paramu
- Sadhana as Reetha

== Soundtrack ==
The music was composed by M. K. Arjunan and the lyrics were written by P. Bhaskaran.

No.	Song	Singers	Lyrics	Length (m:ss)
1	"Kaanana Poykayil"	K. J. Yesudas, Vani Jairam	P. Bhaskaran	
2	"Navarathna Vilpanakkaari"	K. J. Yesudas	P. Bhaskaran	
3	"Vaasara Kshethrathil Nadathurannu"	S. Janaki	P. Bhaskaran	
