= Virunnukari =

- Directed by: P. Venu
- Written by: P. Venu; P. J. Antony (dialogues)
- Screenplay by: P. Venu
- Produced by: P. Venu; Panthalathu Sreedharan
- Starring: Prem Nazir; Madhu; Sheela; Jayabharathi
- Cinematography: T. N. Krishnankutty Nair
- Edited by: G. Venkittaraman
- Music by: M. S. Baburaj
- Production company: Shanthasree
- Distributed by: Shanthasree
- Release date: 10 December 1969
- Country: India
- Language: Malayalam

Virunnukari is a 1969 Indian Malayalam-language film, directed and produced by P. Venu. The film stars Prem Nazir, Madhu, Sheela and Usha.

== Plot ==
Virunnukari centers on Radha and Surendran, who are deeply in love. Their romance is cut short by a tragic romantic rivalry. To ensure the happiness of another woman named Malathi who is also infatuated with Surendran, Radha selflessly breaks off her own relationship so the two can marry.

== Cast ==
- Prem Nazir as Madhavankutty
- Madhu as Sethu
- Sheela as Radha
- Jayabharathi as Shantha
- Ambika as Malathi
- K. P. Ummer as Surendran
- Adoor Bhasi as Swami
- Sankaradi
- Sreelatha Namboothiri as Sreelatha
- T. R. Omana as Surendran's mother
- T. S. Muthaiah as Panikkar
- Abbas (Old)
- Adoor Bhavani as Kalyani
- Kaduvakulam Antony as Paramu
- Lakshmi (Old) as Usha
- M. S. Namboothiri as Sankunni Menon
- Nellikode Bhaskaran as Raman Nair
- Vidhubala as Mohanam
- P. J. Antony as Raghava Menon master
- Sukumari as Kamakshiyamma
- P. R. Menon
- Vidhubala as Swami's daughter

== Soundtrack ==
The music was composed by M. S. Baburaj and the lyrics were written by P. Bhaskaran.

Song	Singers
"Ambaadi Pennungalodu"	P. Leela
"Chumalil Swapanathin"	K. J. Yesudas
"Innale Njaanoru"	S. Janaki, C. O. Anto
"Muttathemullathan"	S. Janaki
"Pormulakkachayumaay"	P. Leela
"Vaasantha Sadanathin"	P. Jayachandran
