= P. Venu =

Indian film director (1940)

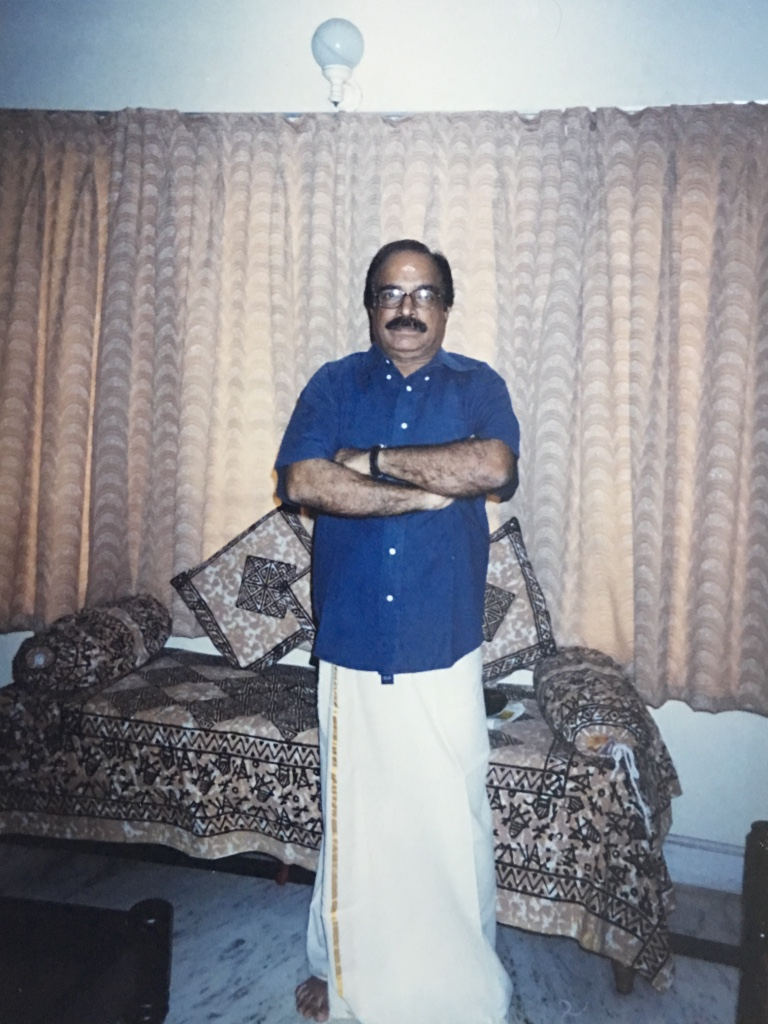
- Born: Pattathil Venugopala Menon; 8 November 1940; Purannatukara, Thrissur, Kingdom of Cochin, British India
- Died: 25 May 2011 (aged 70); Chennai, Tamil Nadu, India
- Other names: Venu, Udhyogastha Venu
- Occupations: Film director; producer; screenwriter; lyricist
- Years active: 1967–2011
- Notable work: Udhyogastha; Virunnukari; Veettu Mrugam; Viruthan Shanku; C.I.D. Nazir; Taxi Car; Prethangalude Thazhvara; Ariyappedatha Rahasyam; Parinamam (The Change)
- Spouse: Sasekala(1972-2011)
- Children: Vijay Menon, Sridevi Menon
- Awards: Kala Prathiba (Kerala Film Critics Association) 2005

P. Venu (8 November 1940 – 25 May 2011) was an Indian film director, producer, scriptwriter, and lyricist with over 20 films to his credit. His directorial venture Udhyogastha in 1967 was the first-ever multi-star cast film of South India. His work in Malayalam cinema was significant and influential, spanning all themes and genres over a career of more than 40 years. His most recognized film, C.I.D. Nazir, in 1971, revolutionized movie-making in the investigative genre in Malayalam cinema. Following this film's commercial and critical success, he came up with two more in the series - Taxi Car in 1972 and Prethangalude Thazhvara in 1973- as the first investigative sequels in Malayalam cinema. His last film, Parinamam (The Change), in 2003 won an honor for Malayalam cinema on the global stage by winning the Best Screenplay Award at the Ashdod International Film Festival in Israel. In 2005, he received the Kala Prathiba (Icon of Creative Arts) Award from the Kerala Film Critics Association for his immense contribution to Malayalam cinema. He was also an active member of MACTA (Malayalam Cine Technicians Association). He published his book, Udyogastha Muthal (meaning ‘Udyogastha Onwards’), in 2010, reminiscing about his life as a filmmaker and his experiences in the film industry.

== Early life ==
Venu was born in Puranattukara, Thrissur district, Kerala, he was the son of Madhava Kurup and Amminiamma. His fascination and passion for filmmaking led him to Merryland Studio in Trivandrum, where he worked as an assistant director for a few years before making his directorial debut with Udhyogastha in 1967.

== Personal life ==
In 1972, Venu married Sasekala from Parithipulli in Palakkad district, Kerala. Their son Vijay Menon is a writer, filmmaker, freelancer, and creative consultant. Their daughter Sridevi Menon was a professor at Ethiraj College for Women, Chennai, presently settled with her husband in Canada.

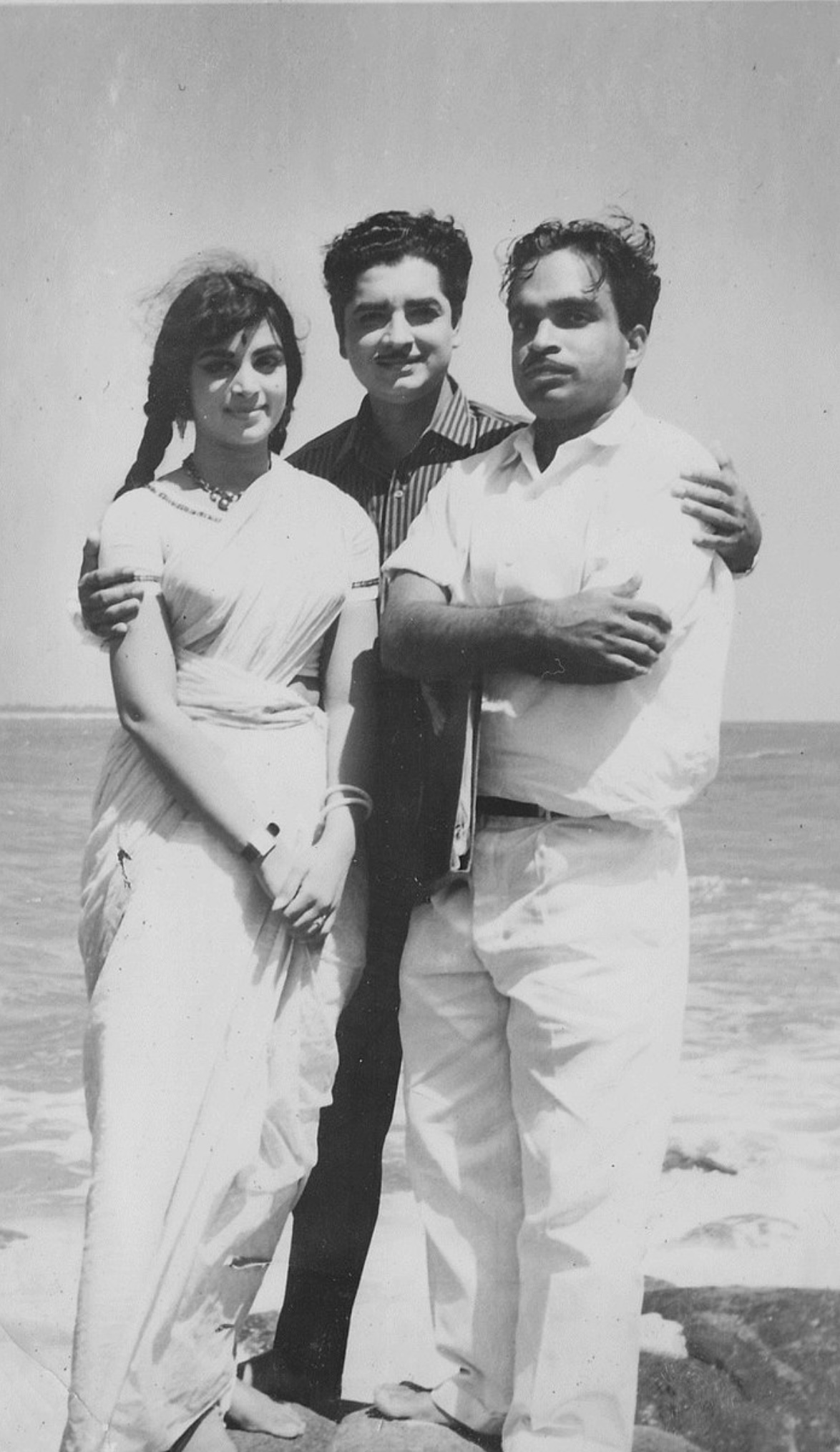
P. Venu, during the making of Udhyogastha.

== Career ==
Venu made his debut as a filmmaker with Udhyogastha in 1967, the first multi-superstar cast Malayalam film starring Prem Nazir, Satyan, Madhu, K. P. Ummer, Sharada and Vijaya Nirmala. It was also the debut film of the National award winner Shoba as a child artist. She was named 'Baby Shoba' by Venu. He followed this commercial success with family dramas Virunnukari and Veettu Mrugam, both in 1969. His versatility was widely acclaimed when he directed the first full-length comedy Viruthan Shanku in 1968, starring the legendary comedian Adoor Bhasi. His works covered different themes and genres, earning him much regard as one of the veteran film directors of south India. He revolutionized Malayalam movie-making in the investigative genre in 1971 with C.I.D. Nazir, followed by Taxi Car in 1972 and Prethangalude Thazhvara in 1973. The first-ever investigative sequel made in Malayalam cinema history. His collaboration with the then superstar action hero Jayan created the iconic action scene in Ariyappedatha Rahasyam in 1981. Apart from a strong storyline, action, and drama, his movies were also famous for songs. Few of the compositions like Anuraga Ganam Pole (Udhyogastha), Ezhuthiyatharanu Sujatha (Udhyogastha), Ninmamiarayile (CID Nazir), Neela Nishidhini (C.I.D. Nazir), Malayala Bashathan (Prethangalude Thazhvazha) have become evergreen hits of Malayalam cinema. Music in his movies was composed by legendary music directors like M.S. Baburaj (Baburaj), G. Devarajan, K. Raghavan, R. K. Shekhar, M. K. Arjunan, Raveendran and Johnson. He worked with the leading actors, musicians, cinematographers, production houses for over four decades. He also debuted the careers of many of today’s top film and entertainment personalities in the industry. His last film, Parinamam (The Change), for NFDC (National Film Development Corporation of India), won an honour for Malayalam cinema in 2003. It won the Best Screenplay Award at the Ashdod International Film Festival in Israel. His creative work and love for cinema led him to publish Udyogastha Muthal in 2010, where he penned his life and experiences as a filmmaker. In 2005 Kerala Film Critics Association bestowed him with the Kala Prathiba ‘Icon of Creative Arts Award for his film-making, creativity, and contribution to the Malayalam cinema industry.

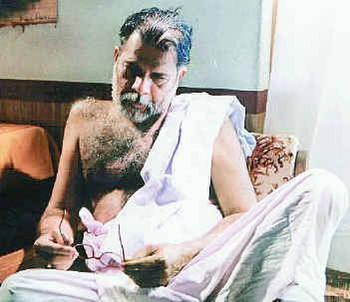
Parinamam (The Change) 2003.

== Parinamam (The Change) ==
Parinamam (The Change), an NFDC film released in 2003 directed by Venu, tackles the age-old issue of loneliness and redundancy among the aged. Balakrishna Marar, played by Madampu Kunjukuttan, faces callous treatment from his family after his retirement. Parallel to his story is that of the mentally disturbed and lonely former judge Damodaran Nambeeshan, played by Nedumudi Venu, who goes to Kashi searching for peace. The problems of five other senior citizens form the basis of the film. The story revolves around these characters, who lose everything they hold dear, feel rejected, and come to feel like a burden on their families and society. In 2003, the film was screened at the Malayalam Film Festival, Dubai, Chennai International Film Festival, and the Indian Panorama section of the International Film Festival of India. The film was selected at Cannes 2004. In 2005, the film won the Best Screenplay Award at the Ashdod International Film Festival held in Israel. It was one of the films NFDC India released in 2012-13 under Cinemas of India with the highly acclaimed Gandhi by Richard Attenborough and Train to Pakistan by Pamela Rooks. It was recently screened at the Indian Film Festival in Budapest (7–12 February 2014), celebrating the 100 years of Indian Cinema. And also the first Malayalam film to be shown in Hungary with Hungarian subtitles. Parinamam (The Change) was screened at the XXX International Festival Sarajevo, celebrating the 30th anniversary of Sarajevo Winter 2014, held under the motto Peace, Art, Freedom.

== Death ==
Venu died due to cardiac arrest on 25 May 2011 at his residence in Shenoy Nagar, Chennai, Tamil Nadu. His cremation was held at Cheruthuruthy on the banks of Bharathapuzha, Shornur, Kerala.

== Filmography ==
- Udhyogastha - 1967
- Viruthan Shanku - 1968
- Virunnukari - 1969
- Veettu Mrugam - 1969
- Detective 909 Keralathil - 1970
- C.I.D. Nazir - 1971
- Taxi Car - 1972
- Prethangalude Thazhvara - 1973
- Boy Friend - 1975
- Cherupakkar Sukshikuga - 1976
- Raathriyile Yaathrakkaar - 1976
- Aalmaaraattam - 1978
- Amrutha Chumbanam - 1979
- Avalude Prathikaram - 1979
- Ward No.7 - 1979
- Pichathikuttappan - 1979
- Ariyappedatha Rahasyam - 1981
- Aranjaanam - 1982
- Thacholi Thankappan - 1984
- Shesham Screenil - 1990
- Parassala Pachan Payyannur Paramu - 1999
- Parinamam (The Change) - 2003

== Published ==
- Venu (2010). Udyogastha Muthal (in Malayalam). Kannur: Kairali Books India. ISBN 978-93-80696-43-0.
