= Kururamma =

Kururamma (1570–1640 AD) was a devotee of Guruvayoorappan (Lord Krishna of Guruvayoor). Born in the village of Parur, near the abode of Saint Vilwamangalam, as "Gauri", she received the name Kururamma since she was the senior-most woman of the Kurur Illam. She was a childless widow, known for her religious devotion. Kururamma features in various legends associated with the Guruvayoor Temple.She was also associated with watching her neighbour's child play like little Krishna and regarded him to have a similar behaviour an traits like him. Kururamma is known for pouring her maternal love into Krishna, treating him as a son. Once, a little boy named Unni(Lord Guruvayurappan) visited Kururamma. Kururamma bathed him, fed him, scolded him, and even sang a lullaby to put him to sleep. The gods watched as the Lord of all was being treated as a son to a poor old widow. She exemplifies the path of loving god as one's child, showing that devotion can be intimate and domestic. Her life proves that one does not need scholarship or ritual mastery to impress the almighty-simple, heartfelt love is enough. Her stories remain part of Kerala's devotional folklore, inspiring generations of worshippers.
