= Kiralur =

Coordinates: 11°19′N 75°49′E

- village
- Interactive map of Kiralur
- Country: India
- State: Kerala
- District: Thrissur
- Talukas: Kunnamkulam

Languages
  - Official: Malayalam, English
- Time zone: UTC+5:30 (IST)
- PIN: 680601
- Telephone code: 0488-528XXXX
- Vehicle registration: KL-48

Kiralur is a village in Thrissur district in the state of Kerala, India.
