= Prem Nazir =

Indian actor (1926–1989)

PB Prem Nazir
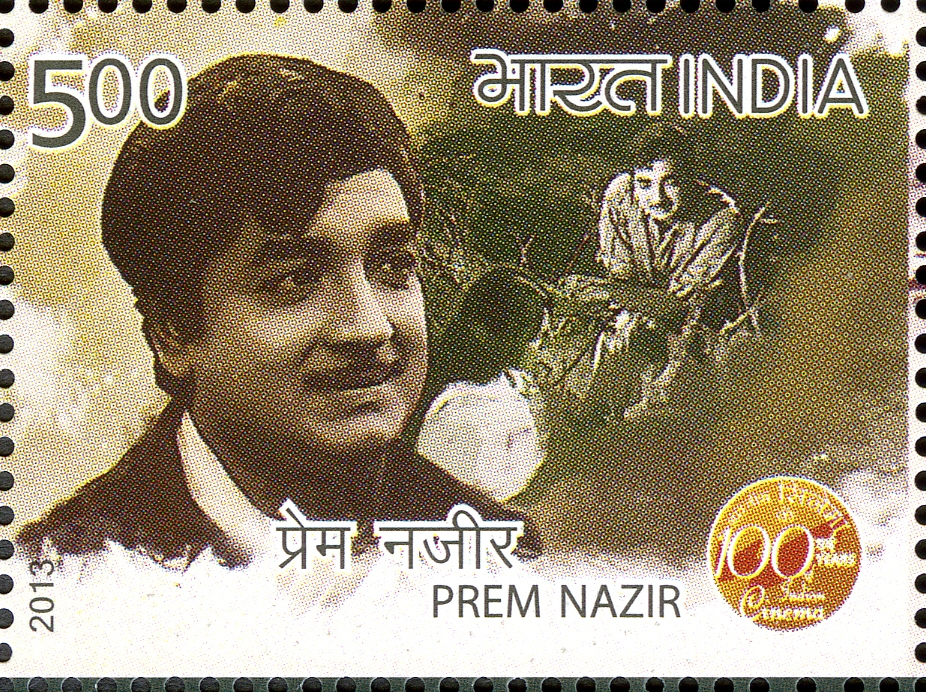
- Prem Nazir, stamp of India in 2013
- Born: Abdul Khader; 16 December 1929; Chirayinkeezhu, Kingdom of Travancore, British Raj (present day Thiruvananthapuram, Kerala, India)
- Died: 16 January 1989 (aged 59); Madras, Tamil Nadu, India
- Resting place: Chirayinkeezhu, Thiruvananthapuram, India
- Other names: Nithyaharitha Nayakan (Evergreen Hero)
- Education: St. Berchmans College, Changanassery; Sanatana Dharma College, Alappuzha
- Occupation: Actor
- Years active: 1951–1989
- Works: Filmography
- Spouse: Habeeba Beevi (m. 1949)
- Children: 4, including Shanavas
- Relatives: Prem Nawas (brother)
- Awards: Padma Bhushan (1983)

Prem Nazir (born Abdul Khader; 16 December 1929 – 16 January 1989) was an Indian actor known as one of Malayalam cinema's definitive leading men of his generation. He is widely regarded as one of the most influential actors in the history of Indian cinema. A popular cultural icon of Kerala, Nazir is often referred to as Nithyaharitha Nayakan ("Evergreen Hero"). Nazir began his career as a stage actor and made his film debut with the 1952 film Marumakal. He took on the stage name Prem Nazir, named by Thikkurissi, on the sets of his second film, Visappinte Vili.

Nazir is noted for his performances in films such as Murappennu (1965), Udhyogastha (1967), Iruttinte Athmavu (1967), Kallichellamma (1969), Virunnukari (1969), Nadhi (1969), C.I.D. Nazir (1971), Anubhavangal Paalichakal (1971), Taxi Car (1972), Azhakulla Saleena (1973), Nellu (1974), Ariyappedatha Rahasyam (1981), Vida Parayum Munpe (1981), Padayottam (1982), and Dhwani (1988). Nazir won the Kerala State Film Award (Special Jury Award) for his role as Madhavan Kutty in Vida Parayum Munpe. The Government of India honoured him with the Padma Bhushan, the third-highest national civilian honour, for his contribution towards the arts. He died due to measles on 16 January 1989 at the age of 59.

Nazir holds the Guinness World Records for playing opposite the same heroine in 130 films (with Sheela) and the record for playing the lead role in a record 720 films. He also holds two other acting records; for acting opposite eighty heroines and for acting in lead roles in 30 films which were released in a single year (1973 and 1977).

== Early life ==
Nazir was born in Chirayinkeezhu in the princely state of Travancore (now in Thiruvananthapuram district of Kerala), to Akkode Shahul Hamid and Asuma Beevi on 16 December 1929 in a Rowther family. He had two brothers - Prem Nawas (Abdul Wahab) - and Ashraf and six sisters - Sulekha, Arifa, Aneesa, Umaiba, Sunaisa and Suhara. His mother died when he was very young, and his father remarried a woman of the same name. He completed his formal education from Kadinamkulam Lower Primary School, Sri Chithiravilasam School, Thiruvananthapuram, Sanatana Dharma College, Alappuzha, and St. Berchmans College, Changanassery. By the time he completed his education, he had become an experienced drama artist.

== Career ==
=== Entry into cinema ===
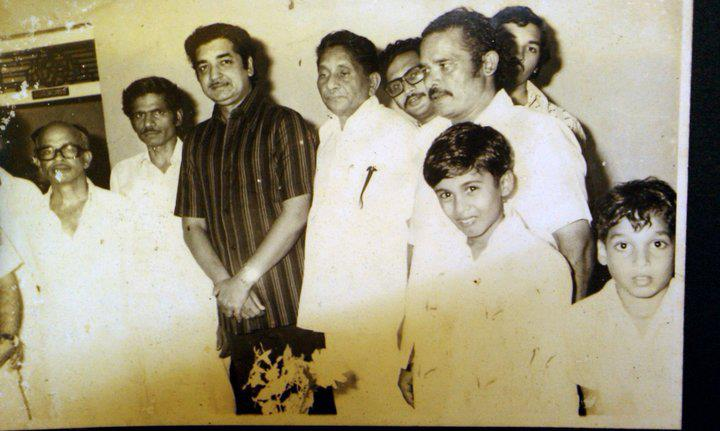
Prem Nazir with friends in Perumbavoor.

Prem Nazir had his acting debut as Shylock in the play The Merchant of Venice (1951), when he was a student at SB College, Changanacherry. He won the best actor award for this role in the play directed by an English Professor of SB College, Prof. C A. Sheppard. His first film was Marumakal (1952), directed by S. K. Chari and produced by Paul Kallungal. He was credited as Abdul Khader in this film. He got his career break with Visappinte Vili (1952), his second film, made for K&K Combines (Udaya Studio) by Telugu director Mohan Rao. It was on the set of this movie he was renamed to Prem Nazir by Thikkurussi Sukumaran Nair. Prem Nazir started his career when drama was the most popular visual medium and film making at its infancy. He began acting for the Excel Productions (Udaya Studio) and most of his films were for the Udaya and Merryland Studios.

=== 1950s: Rise to stardom ===
The theatrical conventions that characterized much of South Indian cinema during the period also complemented his background in stage performance. His proficiency in Malayalam and experience in theatre were regarded as important factors in his screen success and enduring popularity.

=== 1960s, 1970s: Golden years ===
In the late 1950s, Nazir drew attention by playing movies with themes based on social and religious injustices in the society. From 1956 to 1976, Prem Nazir rode high at the crest of a tidal wave of popularity and also gave his best to Malayalam cinema. Nazir catapulted to the row of the finest actors of India with the film Iruttinte Athmavu (1967). Playing a demented youth – Velayadhan, Prem Nazir discovered his prowess as a dramatic actor of great intensity. Many critics have evaluated this role as his masterpiece, and as one of the finest onscreen performances ever. Written by M. T. Vasudevan Nair, the film provided Malayalam cinema with a new direction; that of the low-budget film. One could see a lot of the pre-occupations of the scenarist, who carried the touches of human relationships through all of his subsequent films whether as screenplay writer or director. In spite of its large number of studio shots and overall theatricality, the film was so culturally rich that many of the episodes would become archetypes for future Malayalam film makers dealing with family drama. It depicted the story of an imbecile (finely portrayed by Prem Nazir) in a joint family with remarkable sensitivity and seriousness of purpose.

During his peak time, Nazir gave life to many characters and enjoyed a wide popularity among all sects of the society. He acted in the first-ever investigative series in Malayalam cinema C.I.D. Nazir directed by P. Venu. He played historical characters based on Vadakkan Pattukal. Aromalunni, Kannappanunni, Thacholi Ambu and Padayottam are some major films in this genre. Although the actor faced criticism for playing such roles as his physique was least suited for it, he still enjoyed a huge fan following among the audiences. He was well known for his roles as Hindu deities like Rama, Krishna and Ayyappa. In his movies, Nazir was well known for playing the eternal romantic hero and the good guy who would bash up the villains without remorse.

Even though Nazir could not regenerate after the mid-1970s, he maintained his superstardom till the beginning of the 1980s. In 1979, 39 of his films got released; a record. He also holds the record for having acted in the most leading roles – about 700 films (with 85 heroines; another record). Another record is for the most enduring screen team along with actress Sheela. They played opposite each other in 130 movies by 1975. Although Sheela is known as the lucky mascot of Prem Nazir, his movies with other heroines like Jayabharathi and Sharada were also big successes at box office. Prem Nazir pairing with comedian Adoor Bhasi was a sure-fire laugh riot. The void left by this duo is yet to be occupied. Nazir's association with playback singer K. J. Yesudas was perfect for the audience. Even today many consider the Nazir – Yesudas combination of song sequences remain the best ever on screen. He is quite popularly described as Nithyaharithanayakan (The Evergreen Hero), which does justice to the fact that he was acting as the hero in his elder years as well. Senior Malayalam cine actress Kaviyoor Ponnamma has revealed that Prem Nazir was a very good singer, and had training in Carnatic music.

=== 1980s: Late career ===
By the beginning of the 1980s, Nazir himself moved into supporting roles. He mostly played supporting roles with Jayan, Sukumaran, Shankar and Soman. In 1980, he acted in Ariyappedatha Rahasyam directed by P. Venu along with Jayan. In 1981, he played a major supporting role in Mohan's Vida Parayum Munpe that earned him the Kerala State Special Jury Award. His most iconic role till date came in the form of Padayottam released in 1982. Based loosely on the evergreen classic, The Count of Monte Cristo by Alexandre Dumas, Nazir played the titular role of Thamban, a prince who is cheated by his so called dear ones and friends and made a slave in a vessel. How he returns and hunts down those who were responsible for wrecking his life forms the crux of the story. He played his last hero role in Vellarikka Pattanam (1985) along with Ratheesh. It is also reputed the Nazir missed the National Award for Best Actor by just one vote for the role. His second last film was Ayalvasi Oru Daridravasi (1986), where he starred with Mukesh, Shankar, Nedumudi Venu, Sukumari and Seema. His last completed film was A. T. Abu's Dhwani (1988), in which he co-starred with Jayaram. His last release was Priyadarshan's Kadathanadan Ambadi (1990), in which he co-starred with Mohanlal. In one of his last interviews, he had expressed a desire to direct a film with Mammootty and Mohanlal in the lead.

=== Popular film genres ===
Two popular film series initiated by Prem Nazir are the C.I.D series and the Vadakkanpattu series. The former is a group of investigative films by P. Venu in which Nazir played James Bond like protagonists. In most of these movies Nazir teamed with Adoor Bhasi, a famed comedy actor who would accompany Nazir characters in investigations. C.I.D. Nazir directed by P. Venu, has inspired numerous adaptations and similar series like for example popular CBI series with Mammootty in the lead and a satirical CID series of Mohanlal-Sreenivasan team. Other inspired films are C.I.D Unnikrishnan starring Jayaram.

Another film series starring Nazir was a series of movies based on Vadakanpaattu which are part of the traditional folklore of Kerala. These are tales of martial warriors spread over generations through folk songs. Although the series may have been initiated by Sathyan's title role in Thacholi Othenan, the trend was continued long after his demise with Nazir in the lead, playing various other characters from Vadakkanpattu.

== Personal life ==
=== Family ===
Prem Nazir was married to Habeeba Beevi and they have one son and three daughters. Their first two daughters, Laila and Rasiya, are older than their son – Shanavas. The youngest daughter is Rita. Shanavas's wife Ayisha Beevi is the daughter of the eldest sister of Prem Nazir, Suleikha Beevi. Shanavas acted in a few films as well but could not succeed like his father. Representing the third generation of Prem Nazir's family, Shanavas's son Shameer Khan, acted in a Malayalam film, Uppukandam Brothers Back in Action.

Prem Nazir's younger brother Prem Nawas (Abdul Wahab) also acted in a few films. Although he was the first in the family to begin acting in movies, he later began producing films – Agniputhri, Thulaavarsham, Poojakku Edukatha Pookkal, Neethi and Keni, to name a few. Prem Nawas's only son, Prem Kishore, has also had a stint with the industry by acting in two Malayalam films – Vacation and Thaskaraputran. Prem Nawas has the distinction of acting in the first ever colour film made in Malayalam – Kandam Becha Kottu.

=== Philanthropic work ===
Prem Nazir, renowned for both his acting prowess and philanthropic endeavours, remains a subject of debate on whether he excelled more as an actor or humanitarian. Widely regarded for his generosity, Nazir treated colleagues, well-wishers, and family with equal kindness. His humanitarian impact became evident posthumously as beneficiaries of his assistance came to light. Nazir's compassion extended to supporting his close friend Jayan, financing the transportation of Jayan's remains following a tragic accident on the set of the movie Kolilakkam.

Notably, Nazir played a pivotal role in promoting his film colleagues, demonstrating a sharp memory by instantly recognising individuals. Collaborating with director M. Sasikumar, he assisted bankrupt producers, aiding them in regaining their prominence in the film industry. Nazir's golden era in Malayalam cinema was characterised by his unparalleled generosity, where he not only contributed to his own success but also facilitated the growth of others in the industry.

Beyond his cinematic achievements, Nazir donated an elephant to the Sarkara Devi Temple in Chirayinkil and authored books such as "Enne Thediyethiya Kathapatrangal" detailing the film characters he portrayed and his autobiography, "Anubhvangal Oarmakal." Director and lyricist Sreekumaran Thampi further honoured Nazir with the book "Prem Nazir Enna Prema Ganam.

=== Death ===
During the late 1980s, when Nazir had campaigned rigorously for a running candidate in politics, he was admitted to Vijaya Hospital in Chennai due to duodenal ulcer. Unfortunately, during treatment he contracted measles, which caused his condition to deteriorate further. Nazir died in the early hours of 16 January 1989, aged 59. His body was transported to Thiruvananthapuram, where he was buried at Kattumurakkal Juma Masjid, Chirayinkeezhu with full state honours.

== Awards ==
Prem Nazir won his only Kerala State Film Award in 1981, a Special Jury Award for the films Vida Parayum Munpe and Parvathy; He won Filmfare Special Award - South for numerous films in 1976 and he won a Special Jury Award for the supporting role he played in the film Vida Parayum Munpe. He was awarded the Padma Bhushan in 1983 by the President of India in recognition of distinguished services of a high order to the nation in his field (acting). The Prem Nazir Award was initiated in his memory, in 1992, for excellence in contributions to the Malayalam cinema Industry. He has also held the position of National Film Award jury in 1985.

== Legacy and influence ==
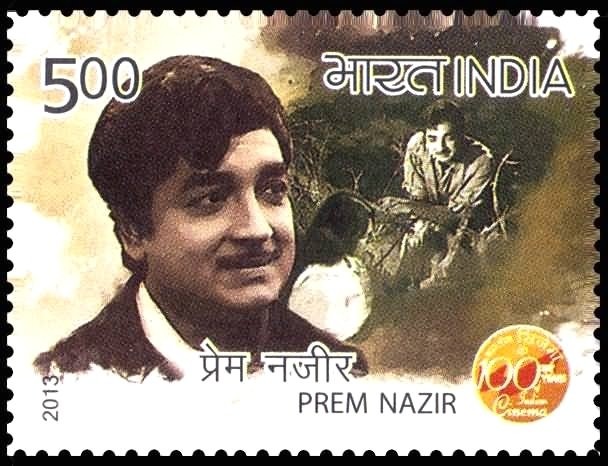
Nazir on a postage stamp of India issued in 2013

Prem Nazir is known to be the most influential and trendsetting lead actor in Malayalam. He is known for his amazing longevity in that he was active during the peak years of other iconic Malayalam superstars like Sathyan and Jayan acting alongside them in 1960s and 1970s respectively. Nazir who began his movie career in the early 1950s, later acted alongside popular future stars like Shankar, Mammootty and Mohanlal by the 1980s. He was a mainstream superstar in Malayalam cinema for over 30 years from the late 1950s to the late 1980s. He also has an unofficial recognition of playing a campus character while in his late fifties. Prem Nazir shares the Guinness World Record for appearing opposite the same actress, Sheela, in 130 films.

Nazir is generally considered the ultimate romantic hero in Malayalam cinema due to his handsomeness and ease of acting in romantic roles particularly in romantic song sequences. His song sequences combined with the lyrics of Vayalar, tunes of Devarajan and voice of K. J. Yesudas produced what is called the golden era of Malayalam film songs. Prem Nazir has also appeared in the highest number of dual roles (more than 40) in Indian films and perhaps in world cinema. The first movie in which he had played a double role was the historical film, Kunjali Marakkar, directed by SS Rajan. The film won the National Film Award for Best Feature Film in Malayalam.
