= Adat (Thrissur) =

- Town
- Location in Kerala, India
- Coordinates: 10.52°N 76.06°E
- Country: India
- State: Kerala
- District: Thrissur
- Tahsil: Thrissur

Government
  - Body: Adat Grama Panchayath

Area
  - Total: 6.91 km^{2} (2.67 sq mi)
- Elevation: 35.19 m (115.5 ft)

Population (2011)
  - Total: 5,721
  - Density: 827.93/km^{2} (2,144.3/sq mi)

Languages
  - Official: Malayalam
- Time zone: UTC+5:30 (IST)
- Telephone code: +91
- Nearest city: Thrissur
- Sex ratio: 1000:999 ♂/♀
- Literacy: 95.94%
- Climate: Average high (°C) (Köppen)

Adat is a town in the Thrissur taluk of Thrissur district with an area of 6.91 km^{2}, located 9 km from the district headquarters of Thrissur and 290 km from the state headquarters of Thiruvananthapuram. It has 1376 households with a total population of 5721 as per the 2011 Census, with 2862 males and 2859 females. The Scheduled Caste population is 997 and the Scheduled Tribes population is 2. The Census Location Code of the town is 627842.
