= P. Jayachandran =

Indian playback singer (1944–2025)

Kalaimamani P. Jayachandran
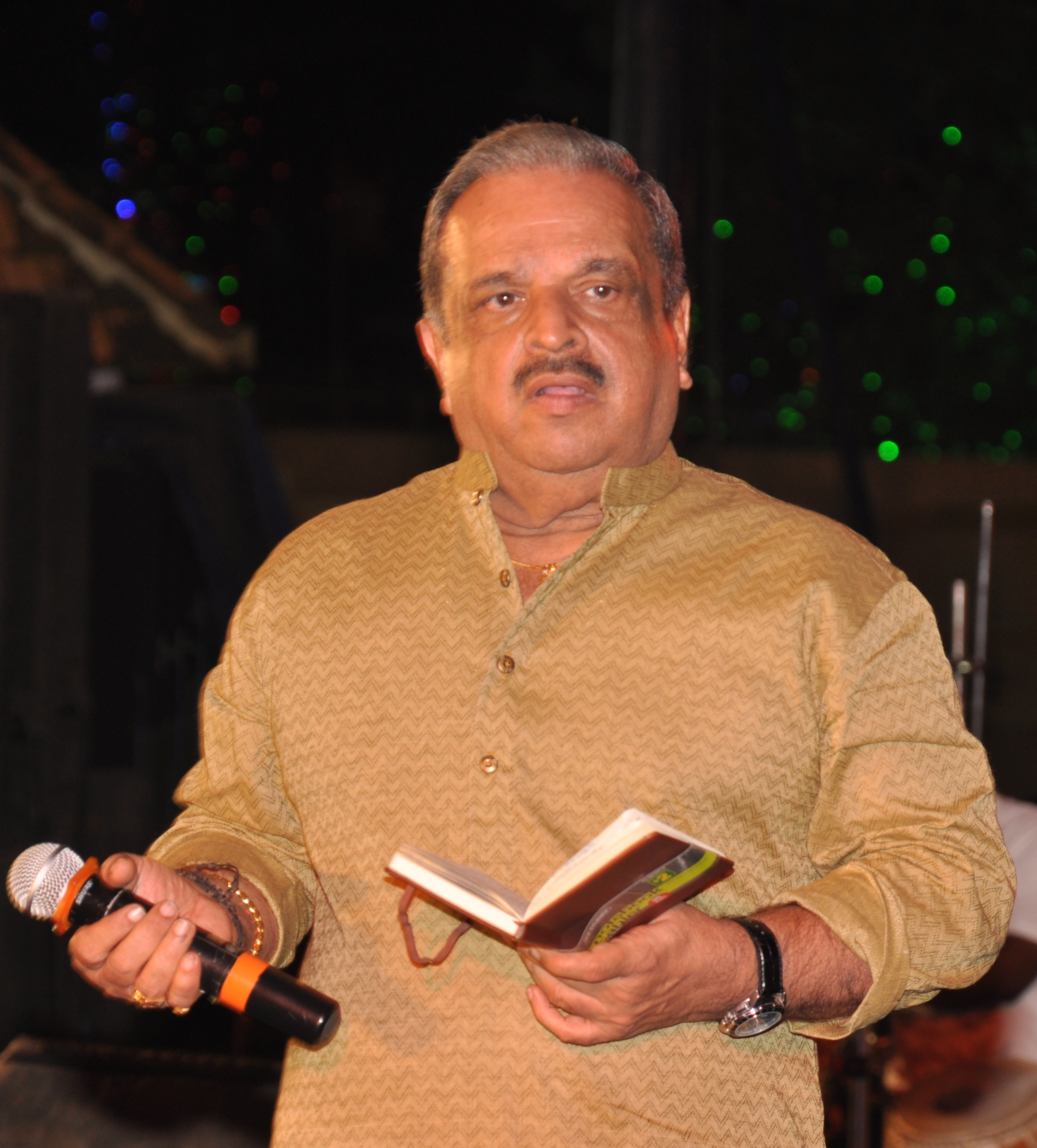
- Jayachandran performing at Kollam

Background information
- Born: Paliyath Jayachandrakuttan; 3 March 1944; Irinjalakuda, Kingdom of Cochin, British India (present-day Kerala, India)
- Died: 9 January 2025 (aged 80) Thrissur, Kerala, India
- Genre: Playback singing
- Occupation: Singer
- Instrument: Mridangam
- Years active: 1965–2025
- Award: Kalaimamani Award (1995)
- Website: jayachandransite.com

Paliyath Jayachandran (3 March 1944 – 9 January 2025) was an Indian playback singer and actor. He collaborated with composers, G. Devarajan, M. S. Baburaj, V. Dakshinamoorthy, K. Raghavan, M. K. Arjunan, M. S. Viswanathan, Vijaya Bhaskar, Ilaiyaraaja, Koti, Shyam, A. R. Rahman, M. M. Keeravani, Vidyasagar and M Jayachandran. Over the course of his career, he recorded more than 16,000 songs in multiple languages and appeared in a few films.

He is widely regarded as one of the greatest expression singers in South India. He also won 2 Tamil Nadu state film awards.

== Early life ==
Jayachandran was born in Paliyath palace at Ravipuram, Kochi, on 3 March 1944, and his family later moved to Irinjalakuda in Thrissur District. He is the third of five children of the late Ravivarma Kochaniyan Thampuran, a member of the Cochin royal family, who was himself a musician, though never a professional singer, and the late Paliyath Subhadrakkunjamma, and also the second of their three sons. His siblings were late Sudhakaran (1940–1990), late Sarasija (1942–2018), Krishnakumar (born 1946) and Jayanthi (born 1948).

Jayachandran was a student of the National High School, Irinjalakuda, from where he received many prizes for playing the mridangam and light music in the State School Youth Festival. He then studied at the Christ College, Irinjalakuda, completing his degree in Zoology.

Jayachandran married Lalitha from Thrissur in May 1973. They have a daughter named Lakshmi and a son named Dinanath, who also sang for films.

== Career ==
Jayachandran met K. J. Yesudas in 1958 when he participated in the state youth festival. Yesudas won the Best Classical Singer award, and Jayachandran won the Best Mridangist award in the same year. He recorded songs in Malayalam, Tamil, Kannada, Telugu and Hindi.

In 1967, he sang the evergreen song "Anuragaganam pole", composed by M.S. Baburaj, for the film Udhyogastha, directed by P. Venu. Later together, P. Venu and Jayachandran produced more hits like "Ninmaniarayile" C.I.D. Nazir 1971 and "Malayala Bashathan" Prethangalude Thazhvara 1973. Jayachandran received the Kerala State Film Award for Best Singer in 1972 for the song "Neelagiriyude ('Suprabhaatham')" for the film Panitheeratha Veedu. Its music was done by M. S. Viswanathan. The year 1978 brought him another Kerala State award, this time for the song "Ragam Sreeragam" from the film Bandhana, composed by M. B. Sreenivasan. In 1985 he received the National Film Award for Best Male Playback Singer for the song "Sivasankara Sarva Saranya Vibho" from the film Sree Narayana Guru, composed by G. Devarajan. The song "Prayam Nammil", from the film Niram, brought him a third Kerala state award in 1998. In 2015 he received the next state award for his songs in Jilebi and Ennu Ninte Moideen 46th Kerala State Film Awards. In 1975, he sang for the Malayalam movie Penpada (with music by R. K. Shekhar) a song called "Velli then Kinnam Pol", regarded as the first composition of the then 9-year-old Dileep Shekhar, now more widely known as A. R. Rahman.

Jayachandran worked in close collaboration with the composer Ilayaraja, producing numerous popular hits in the Tamil language, including "Raasaathi Unna", "Kaathirundhu Kaathirundhu" (both from the 1984 release Vaidhegi kaathirundhaal), "Mayanginen Solla Thayanginen" (from the 1985 release Naaney raaja naaney mandhiri), "Vaalkaiye Vesham" (from the 1979 release Aarilirundhu Arubathu Varai), "Poova Eduthu Oru" (from the 1986 release Amman Kovil Kizhakaaley) and "Thaalaattudhey Vaanam" (from the 1981 release Kadal Meengal). In 1994, he received the Tamil Nadu State Film Award for Best Singer for the song "Kathazham Kattuvazhi" for the film Kizhakku Cheemayile, composed by A. R. Rahman. As a recognition of his contribution to Tamil film music, he was honoured with the 1997 Kalaimamani award of the Tamil Nadu Government.

Jayachandran was honoured with the Swaralaya Kairali Yesudas award at the beginning of 2001, which he was the first person to receive. The motive behind this award is to choose the best from the singers and lyricists, within a span of 30 years. He sang nearly 1000 songs for Malayalam movies over the years, according to the MSI information database.

Jayachandran sang in Hindi for the first time in 2008 for the movie ADA...A Way of Life along with Alka Yagnik, with music scored by A. R. Rahman.

== Death ==
Jayachandran died from liver cancer in Thrissur, Kerala, on 9 January 2025, at the age of 80. He was cremated with full state honours at his ancestral home in Chendamangalam, North Paravur, Kerala on 11 January 2025.

== Awards ==
Year	Award	Category	Film	Result	Ref.
1985	National Film Awards	National Film Award for Best Male Playback Singer	Sree Narayana Guru	Won	
1972	Kerala State Film Awards	Kerala State Film Award for Best Singer	Panitheeratha Veedu	Won	
1978	Kerala State Film Awards	Kerala State Film Award for Best Singer	Bandhanam	Won	
1999	Kerala State Film Awards	Kerala State Film Award for Best Singer	Niram	Won	
2003	Kerala State Film Awards	Kerala State Film Award for Best Singer	Thilakkam	Won	
2015	Kerala State Film Awards	Kerala State Film Award for Best Singer	Jilebi, Ennum Eppozhum, Ennu Ninte Moideen	Won	
1993	Tamil Nadu State Film Awards	Tamil Nadu State Film Award for Best Male Playback Singer	Kizhakku Cheemayile	Won	

=== Honours ===
- 1995: Received title of Kalaimamani Award by the Government of Tamil Nadu, which is the highest state honour in the field of Arts
- 2001: Awarded the Swaralaya Kairali Yesudas Award
- 2020: Awarded the J. C. Daniel Award is the highest award in Malayalam cinema, by the Government of Kerala

== Discography ==
=== Tamil Songs ===
Year	Film	Song title	Music director	Co-singer
1973	Manipayal	Thanga Chimizh Pol	M. S. Viswanathan	
1973	Alaigal	Ponnenna Poovenna	M. S. Viswanathan	
1974	Engal Kula Dheivam	Anbumikka Maappillaikku	M. S. Viswanathan	S. Janaki
1974	Naan Avanillai	Manthaara Malare	M. S. Viswanathan	L. R. Eswari
1975	Thiyaga Ullam	Naano Un Adimai	V. Kumar	P. Susheela
1976	Idhaya Malar	Anbe Un Per Enna	M. S. Viswanathan	Vani Jairam
1976	Inspector Manaivi	Ilamaiyin Uraile	Shankar–Ganesh	P. Susheela
1976	Mayor Meenakshi	Thirumurugan Aruginile Valli Kurathi	M. S. Viswanathan	Vani Jairam
1976	Moondru Mudichu	Vasanthakaala Nadhigalile	M. S. Viswanathan	Vani Jairam & M. S. Viswanathan
1976	Moondru Mudichu	Aadi Velli	M. S. Viswanathan	Vani Jairam
1976	Mutthana Mutthullavo	Paalaabishegam Seiyavo	M. S. Viswanathan	P. Susheela
1976	Needhikku Thalaivanangu	Ethanai Manithargal	M. S. Viswanathan	
1976	Oru Kodiyil Iru Malargal	Kannanin Sannathiyil	M. S. Viswanathan	P. Susheela
1976	Oru Kodiyil Iru Malargal	Kannanin Sannathiyil	M. S. Viswanathan	
1976	Ungalil Oruthi	Samatthil Poottha Malli	M. S. Viswanathan	Vani Jairam
1977	Durga Devi	Sendhoora Kolam	Ilaiyaraaja	S. Janaki
1977	Durga Devi	Sendhoora Kolam (sad)	Ilaiyaraaja	S. Janaki
1977	Ellam Avale	Naan Varaindha	M. S. Viswanathan	
1977	Nandha En Nila	Oru Kaathal Saamrajyam	V. Dakshinamoorthy	T. K. Kala
1977	Nee Vazha Vendum	Andhi Varum Neratthile	M. S. Viswanathan	P. Susheela
1977	Nee Vazha Vendum	Vizhiyo Urangavillai	M. S. Viswanathan	Vani Jairam
1977	Sonthamadi Nee Enakku	Pennnalla Nee	V. Kumar	P. Susheela
1977	Thoondil Meen	Ennodu Ennenavo Ragasiyam	V. Kumar	K. Swarna
1978	Aarilirunthu Arubathu Varai	Vaazhkaiye Vesham	Ilaiyaraja	
1978	Aayiram Jenmangal	Kannan Mugam Kaana	M. S. Viswanathan	Vani Jairam
1978	Kaatrinile Varum Geetham	Chithirai Sevvanam	Ilaiyaraja	
1978	Kaatrinile Varum Geetham	Oru Vaanavil Pole	Ilaiyaraja	S. Janaki
1978	Karate Kamala	Aandavan Pillai	Shankar–Ganesh	Vani Jairam
1978	Kizhake Pogum Rail	Mancholai Kilithano	Ilaiyaraaja	
1978	Madhuraiyai Meetta Sundharapandiyan	Amutha Tamizhil	M. S. Viswanathan	Vani Jairam
1978	Meenakshi Kungumam	Srirangano Sridheviyo	Shankar–Ganesh	Vani Jairam
1978	Pilot Premnath	Azhagi Oruthi	M. S. Viswanathan	L. R. Eswari
1978	Sonnadhu Nee Thanaa	Velli Nila	Ilaiyaraaja	
1978	Thanga Rangan	Udhadugalil Undhu	M. S. Viswanathan	P. Susheela
1978	Thirukkalyanam	Alaiye Kadal Alaiye	Ilaiyaraaja	S. Janaki
1978	Unakkum Vaazhvu Varum	Naan Medhuvaaga	V. Kumar	P. Susheela
1978	Vanakkatukuriya Kathaliye	Swing Swing Unadhu	M. S. Viswanathan	Vani Jairam
1979	Aasaikku Vayasillai	Naan Raamanai	M. S. Viswanathan	Vani Jairam
1979	Anbe Sangeetha	Petthaalum Petthenada	Ilaiyaraaja	S. P. Sailaja
1979	Anbe Sangeetha	Geetha Sangeetha	Ilaiyaraaja	Jensy
1979	Azhiyatha Kolangal	Poovannam Pola Minnum	Salil Chowdhury	P. Susheela
1979	Azhage Unnai Aarathikkiren	Azhage Unnai	Ilaiyaraaja	
1979	Azhage Unnai Aarathikkiren	Masthaana	Ilaiyaraaja	S. P. Balasubrahmanyam, Vani Jairam & Jensy
1979	Malargalile Oru Malligai unreleased	Sindhu Nadhiyoram	Gangai Amaran	P. Susheela
1979	Malargalile Oru Malligai unreleased	Poove Malligai	Gangai Amaran	S. Janaki
1979	Mambazhathu Vandu	Meena Hello	Shankar–Ganesh	
1979	Mugathil Mugam Paarkalaam	Akka Oru Raajaatthi	Gangai Amaran	Jensy
1979	Muthal Iravu	Manjal Nilavukku	Ilaiyaraja	P. Susheela
1979	Nallathoru Kudumbam	Sevvaname Ponmegame	Ilaiyaraaja	T. L. Maharajan, Kalyani Menon & B. S. Sasirekha
1979	Nenjil Aadum Poo Ondru unreleased	Vaanam Enge	Ilaiyaraaja	S. Janaki
1979	Pagalil Oru Iravu	Kalaiyo Silaiyo Ithu Ponmaan Nila	Ilaiyaraaja	
1979	Pancha Boodham	En Raasaathi	Shankar–Ganesh	S. Janaki
1979	Porter Ponnusamy	Endiyamma Pakkam	M. S. Viswanathan	L. R. Eswari
1979	Suprabadham	Kosalaiyin Thirukkumaraa	M. S. Viswanathan	
1979	Thisai Maariya Paravaigal	Raja Vaada Singakutti	M. S. Viswanathan	S. Janaki
1979	Valampuri Sangu	Idhu Kaala Kaalam	Gangai Amaran	S. Janaki
1979	Velli Ratham	Kalaimagal Alaimagal	M. S. Viswanathan	P. Susheela
1980	Aayiram Vaasal Idhayam	Maharani Unnai Thedi	Ilaiyaraaja	S. Janaki
1980	Anna Paravai	Soodaana Ennam	R. Ramanujam	S. Janaki
1980	Azhaithal Varuven	Manmadhan Veenaiyile	M. S. Viswanathan	Vani Jairam
1980	Deiveega Raagangal	Paavai Nee Malaigai	M. S. Viswanathan	Vani Jairam
1980	Doorathu Idi Muzhakkam	Ullamellam Thalladuthe	Salil Chowdary	S. Janaki
1980	Ellam Un Kairasi	Adi Onkaari Aankaari Maari	Ilaiyaraaja	
1980	Gramathu Athiyayam	Ootha Kaathu	Ilaiyaraaja	S. Janaki
1980	Idhayaththil Ore Idam	Kaaveri Gangaikku	Ilaiyaraaja	
1980	Ilaiyaraajavin Rasigai	Aahaa Iruttu Neram	Ilaiyaraaja	S. Janaki
1980	Karumayil Or Azhagu	Thuvalum Kodi	Agathiyar	Vani Jairam
1980	Karumbu Vil	Adi Naagu En Raasaakili	Gangai Amaran	Malaysia Vasudevan & Krishnamoorthy
1980	Kumari Pennin Ullathile	Madhu Kadalo	Shankar–Ganesh	S. Janaki
1980	Malargale Malarungal	Isaikkavo Nam Kalyaana	Gangai Amaran	S. Janaki
1980	Muyalakku Moonu Kaal	Nilavo Neruppo	Chandrabose	P. Susheela
1980	Naan Nanethan	Ethanai Avathaaram Adada	K. V. Mahadevan	
1980	Nadhiyai Thedi Vandha Kadal	Thavikkuthu Thayanguthu	Ilaiyaraja	S. P. Sailaja
1980	Natchathiram	Vaanam Ingay	Shankar–Ganesh	S. Janaki
1980	Orey Muththam	Aathangkaraiyil Oru	Ilaiyaraaja	P. Susheela
1980	Orey Muththam	Raajaa Ponnu Aadi Vaa	Ilaiyaraaja	
1980	Orey Muththam	Raajaa Ponnu Aadi Vaa (sad)	Ilaiyaraaja	
1980	Oru Thalai Ragam	Kadavul Vaazhum Kovilile	T. Rajendar	
1980	Panam Penn Pasam	Kalai Maamaniye	Shankar–Ganesh	Vani Jairam
1980	Ponnagaram	Muthu Rathamo Mullai	Shankar–Ganesh	Vani Jairam
1980	Pournami Nilavil	Muzhu Nilavu	Shankar–Ganesh	
1980	Pournami Nilavil	Pasikkuthu Ilai	Shankar–Ganesh	
1980	Ramayi Vayasukku Vandhutta	Naalu Vagai	Gangai Amaran	S. Janaki
1980	Rishi Moolam	Nenjil Ulla	Ilaiyaraaja	
1980	Savitri	Mazhai Kaalamum	M. S. Viswanathan	Vani Jairam
1980	Sujatha	Nee Varuvaiyena	M. S. Viswanathan	
1980	Sujatha	Antharanga	M. S. Viswanathan	
1980	Veli Thandiya Velladu	Thuvalum Kodi	Shankar–Ganesh	Vani Jairam
1981	Anbulla Atthan	Paavai Malar	M. S. Viswanathan	P. Susheela
1981	Andha 7 Naatkal	Kavithai Arangerum Neram	M. S. Viswanathan	S. Janaki
1981	Andha 7 Naatkal	Thendraladhu Unnidathil	M. S. Viswanathan	S. Janaki
1981	Andha 7 Naatkal	Swararaaga Suga	M. S. Viswanathan	Vani Jairam
1981	Devi Dharisanam	Sakthi Illamal	M. S. Viswanathan	T. M. Soundararajan
1981	Kilinjalgal	Kilai Ella Marangalil Nizhal	T. Rajendar	
1981	Chinna Mul Peria Mul	Iru Vizhigal Malarthathamma	Shankar–Ganesh	S. Janaki
1981	Kadal Meengal	Thaalattuthey Vaanam	Ilaiyaraaja	S. Janaki
1981	Kaalam	Sugamaana Edhirkaalam	Shankar–Ganesh	Vani Jairam
1981	Kallukkul Therai	Vaa Vaa Aadi Vaa	Shyam	
1981	Kallukkul Therai	Poo Maalaigal	Shyam	S. Janaki
1981	Needhi Pizhaithathu	Edhuvarai Inbam	Shankar–Ganesh	S. Janaki
1981	Nellikani	Paadu Thendrale	Shankar–Ganesh	Vani Jairam
1981	Pattanam Pogalaam Vaa	Aathangkarai Mettorama	Ilaiyaraaja	S. Janaki
1981	Pennin Vaazhkkai	Maasi Maadham Muhurtha Neram	G. K. Venkatesh	P. Susheela
1981	Pennin Vaazhkkai	Maligai Poovil	G. K. Venkatesh	P. Susheela
1981	Pennin Vaazhkkai	Veedu Thedi	G. K. Venkatesh	P. Susheela
1981	Rail Payanangalil	Vasantha Kaalangal	T. Rajendar	
1981	Rajangam	Rosa Malare Azhuva	Shankar–Ganesh	
1981	Sumai	Ammaa Kannu	Gangai Amaran	
1981	Tharaiyil Vaazhum Meengal	Mani Maaligai	Chandrabose	
1981	Thee	Ayyavukku Manasu Irukku	M. S. Viswanathan	Vani Jairam
1982	Garuda Saukiyama	Mottu Vitta Vaasanai	M. S. Viswanathan	S. Janaki
1982	Kadavulukku Oru Kadidham	Aandavan Pillai	Shankar–Ganesh	Vani Jairam
1982	Kanalukku Karaiyethu	Mazhaiyo Mazhai	Chandrabose	S. P. Sailaja
1982	Kanavugal Karpanaigal	Thendral Oru Thaalam	Gangai Amaran	
1982	Krodham	Anjaaru Naal Aachi	Shankar–Ganesh	Vani Jairam
1982	Lottery Ticket	Kannail Vandhaai	L. Vaithi Lakshmanan	Vani Jairam
1982	Marumagale Vazhga	Mangala Medai Athi	Shankar–Ganesh	P. Susheela
1982	Manjal Nila	Poonthendral Kaatre Vaa	Ilaiyaraaja	P. Susheela
1982	Mul Illatha Roja	Vasanthame Varuga	Muraliraj	P. Susheela
1982	Murai Ponnu	Undhan Kaaviya	M. S. Viswanathan	Vani Jairam
1982	Nadamadum Silaigal	Malliya Poova	Shankar–Ganesh	Vani Jairam
1982	Nenjil Oru Raagam	Idhaya Vaasal	T. Rajendar	
1982	Neram Vandhachu	Kaadhal Mandhirathil	Shankar–Ganesh	Vani Jairam
1982	Pakkathu Veettu Roja	Entha Kangal	Shankar–Ganesh	
1982	Panchavarnam	Pottu Mele Pottu	Raghuraj Chakravarthy	
1982	Paritchaikku Neramaachu	Oru Oosaiyindri Mounammaga	M. S. Viswanathan	
1982	Parvaiyin Marupakkam	Poovachu Poothuvandu Maasam	Chandrabose	P. Susheela
1982	Raaga Bandhangal	Malaro Nilavo Malai Magalo	Kunnakkudi Vaidyanathan	
1982	Thaai Mookaambikai	Pasikku Sorum Illai	Ilaiyaraaja	
1982	Thambathyam Oru Sangeetham	Naan Thaayumaanavan	M. S. Viswanathan	
1982	Theerpu	Amma Oru Ambikaiye	M. S. Viswanathan	T. M. Soundararajan & Vani Jairam
1982	Theerpugal Thiruththapadalam	Oru Ooril	Shankar–Ganesh	
1982	Then Chittugal	Kaalai Veiyil	Vijaya Ramani	
1982	Thooku Medai	Kurinji Malar Ondru	Shankar–Ganesh	Vani Jairam
1982	Thunai	Kaatru Nadanthadu	Shankar–Ganesh	Vani Jairam
1983	Alai Payum Nenjangal	Sugamaana Neram	Shankar–Ganesh	Vani Jairam
1983	Aval Oru Kaviyam	Kodi Inbangal	V. Kumar	P. Susheela
1983	Dowry Kalyanam	Enthan Kannana Kannatti	M. S. Viswanathan	S. P. Sailaja
1983	En Aasai Unnoduthan	Unakkaaga Poojai Seidha	Shankar–Ganesh	S. P. Sailaja
1983	Gramathu Kiligal	Kanni Penn	Mani Raja	S. P. Sailaja
1983	Ilayapiravigal	Kaarkaalam Indhu	Shankar–Ganesh	Vani Jairam
1983	Jodi Pura	Enakkoru Manippuraa	Shankar–Ganesh	
1983	Kashmir Kadhali	Sangeethame En	G. K. Venkatesh	P. Susheela
1983	Kodugal Illatha Kolam	Poo Malarum	A. Devaraja	Vani Jairam
1983	Maarupatta Konangal	Nilavil Pirandha	Shankar–Ganesh	Vani Jairam
1983	Mappillai Singam	Yogamidhu Pudhu	Shankar–Ganesh	Vani Jairam
1983	Nenjamellam Neeye	Vayasuponnu	Shankar–Ganesh	Vani Jairam
1983	Oru Odai Nadhiyagirathu	Rathiri Pozhuthu	Ilaiyaraaja	S. P. Sailaja
1983	Seerum Singangal	Thannikkul Nikkudhu	Shankar–Ganesh	P. Susheela
1983	Soorakkottai Singakutti	Kaalidasan Kannadasan	Ilaiyaraaja	P. Susheela
1984	Azhagu	Mounamulla Mayakkam	G. K. Venkatesh	S. Janaki
1984	Ezhuthatha Sattangal	Vanthen Maathiram	Ilaiyaraaja	Vani Jairam
1984	Kathula Poo	Poove Pudhu	Shankar–Ganesh	Latha Rajinikanth
1984	Kaval Kaithigal	Indru Vennila	Shankar–Ganesh	S. P. Sailaja
1984	Komberi Mookan	Oonjal Manam	Ilaiyaraaja	S. Janaki
1984	Madras Vaathiyar	Vizhigale	Shankar-Ganesh	Latha Kannan
1984	Manmadha Rajakkal	Neethaane Thooral	Shankar–Ganesh	S. P. Sailaja
1984	Mudivalla Arambam	Paadi Vaa Thendrale	Ilaiyaraaja	
1984	Nenjathai Allitha	Neeril Oru Thamarai	M. S. Viswanathan	
1984	Oomai Janangal	Ennavo Seidhi	Gangai Amaran	S. Janaki
1984	Pudhumai Penn	Kaadhal Mayakkam	Ilaiyaraja	Sunanda
1984	Sanga Natham	Ethetho Sonnanga	Ilaiyaraaja	Vani Jairam & Malaysia Vasudevan
1984	Shanthi Muhurtham	Vanjikodi Nenjapadi	Shankar–Ganesh	Vani Jairam
1984	Shanthi Muhurtham	Mouname Mouname	Shankar–Ganesh	
1984	Shanthi Muhurtham	Mouname Mouname (sad)	Shankar–Ganesh	
1984	Sonna Namba Maateenga	Valarpirai	Lakshminarayana	
1984	Thiruttu Rajakkal	Ottha Poo	Shankar–Ganesh	S. P. Sailaja
1984	Vaazhkai	Kattikollava	Ilaiyaraaja	Malaysia Vasudevan & S. P. Sailaja
1984	Unnai Naan Santhithen	Devan Thantha Veenai	Ilaiyaraaja	S. Janaki
1985	Aasha	Maalihai Aanaalum	K. V. Mahadevan	Vani Jairam
1985	Chain Jayapal	Kaveri Meen Vazhi	Shankar–Ganesh	Vani Jairam
1985	Chain Jayapal	Thazham Poove	Shankar–Ganesh	
1985	Chidambara Rahasiyam	Malai Varugira Neram	Shankar–Ganesh	S. P. Sailaja
1985	Chidambara Rahasiyam	Chikkan Chikkan Doi	Shankar–Ganesh	S. P. Sailaja
1985	Engal Kural	Oorapaatha Kettupochu	T. Rajendar	Malaysia Vasudevan
1985	Ilamai	Paarthal Nalla	Gangai Amaran	S. N. Surendar
1985	Irandu Manam	Kaarkaala Megam	Gangai Amaran	
1985	Karuppu Sattaikaran	Neerodai Kandu	Shankar–Ganesh	Vani Jairam
1985	Marudhani	Vilakku Vecha	Gangai Amaran	P. Susheela
1985	Mookkanan Kaiyiru	Mei Silirkkudhu	M. S. Viswanathan	Vani Jairam
1985	Naam Iruvar	Thiruvizha	Gangai Amaran	B. S. Sasirekha
1985	Naane Raja Naane Mandhiri	Mayanginen Solla Thayanginen	Ilaiyaraaja	P. Susheela
1985	Naane Raja Naane Mandhiri	Dhegam Siragadikkum	Ilaiyaraaja	K. S. Chithra
1985	Pagal Nilavu	Pooviley Medai	Ilaiyaraaja	P. Susheela
1985	Pillai Nila	Raja Magal Roja Malar	Ilaiyaraaja	S. Janaki
1985	Pournami Alaigal	Thein Paayum	Shankar–Ganesh	Vani Jairam
1985	Rahasiyam	Ammaa Nee	Gangai Amaran	P. Susheela
1985	Thiramai	En Paattu Nee	Shankar–Ganesh	P. Susheela
1985	Vaidehi Kathirunthal	Kaathirundhu Kaathirundhu	Ilaiyaraja	
1985	Vaidehi Kathirunthal	Rasathi Unna	Ilaiyaraja	
1985	Vaidehi Kathirunthal	Indraiku Yen Indha Aanandame	Ilaiyaraja	Vani Jairam
1985	Veli	Dhevi En Dhevi	Shankar–Ganesh	Vani Jairam
1985	Vesham	Paattu Ondru	Shankar–Ganesh	
1985	Viswanathan Velai Venum	Janani Janani	Shankar–Ganesh	S. P. Sailaja
1985	Yaar	Varuvaalo Devi	V. S. Narasimhan	D. Kousalya
1985	Yaaro Azhaikiraargal	Indha Iravil	Shankar–Ganesh	
1985	Yaaro Azhaikiraargal	Manam Unnai	Shankar–Ganesh	Vivek Sarathi
1985	Yaaro Azhaikiraargal	Paal Nilavu	Shankar–Ganesh	
1985	Yemaatrathe Yemaaraathe	Pudikkaiyile Oru	Chandrabose	S. P. Sailaja
1986	Adutha Veedu	Koozhukkum Aasa	Shankar–Ganesh	Latha Kannan
1986	Africavil Appu	Aandavan Pillai	Ilaiyaraaja & Gangai Amaran	
1986	Amman Kovil Kizhakale	Poova Eduthu Oru Maala	Ilaiyaraaja	S. Janaki
1986	December Pookkal	Azhaga Sirithathu	Ilayaraja	S. Janaki
1986	Endravathu Oru Naal	Ullam Unnai	Shankar–Ganesh	Uma Ramanan
1986	Kadaikan Paarvai	Edho Oru	V. S. Narasimhan	P. Susheela
1986	Kadalora Kavithaigal	Kodiyile Malliyappoo	Ilaiyaraaja	S. Janaki
1986	Kagidha Odam	Kottudhamma Neer	Shankar–Ganesh	S. P. Sailaja
1986	Kagidha Odam	Poove Chinna	Shankar–Ganesh	Vani Jairam
1986	Kanna Thorakkanum Saami	Aandavan Pillai	Ilaiyaraaja	
1986	Manakanakku	En Manakkootukkulle	M. S. Viswanathan	
1986	Manakanakku	Chinna Chinna	M. S. Viswanathan	
1986	Manakanakku	Manja Poosi	M. S. Viswanathan	
1986	Manakanakku	Maavaduva	M. S. Viswanathan	
1986	Manthira Punnagai	Naan Kathalil Oru	Ilaiyaraaja	
1986	Meendum Pallavi	Sugandham Manakkindra	M. S. Viswanathan	P. Susheela
1986	Natpu	Unnai Kaana	Ilaiyaraja	P. Susheela
1986	Natpu	Adi Maadi	Ilaiyaraja	Shoba Chandrasekhar
1986	Oru Manithan Oru Manaivi	Maalai Maanjolai	Shankar–Ganesh	Vani Jairam
1986	Pudhiya Poovidhu	Neeraadum Thaamaraiye	Kannan Latha	S. Janaki & Shakthi Shanmugam
1986	Punnagai Mannan	Kavithai Kelungal Karuvi	Ilaiyaraaja	Vani Jairam
1986	Rasigan Oru Rasigai	Ammai Adi Amma	Raveendran	S. Janaki
1986	Samsaram Adhu Minsaram	Azhagiya Anni	Shankar–Ganesh	P. Susheela
1986	Selvaakku	Ilamaiyin Ninaivugal	Chandrabose	Vani Jairam
1986	Thazhuvatha Kaigal	Onna Renda	Ilaiyaraaja	S. Janaki
1986	Thazhuvatha Kaigal	Thottu Paaru	Ilaiyaraaja	S. Janaki
1986	Thazhuvatha Kaigal	Vizhiye Vilakkondru	Ilaiyaraaja	S. Janaki
1987	Aayusu Nooru	Etri Vaitha	T. Rajendar	
1987	Aval Mella Sirithal	Mangala Kungumam	Gangai Amaran	S. P. Sailaja
1987	Chellakutti	Thaayum Naane	Gangai Amaran	K. S. Chithra
1987	Chinna Poove Mella Pesu	Chinna Poove Mella Pesu	S. A. Rajkumar	
1987	Enga Veettu Ramayanam	Chinna Ponnu	Shankar–Ganesh	S. P. Sailaja
1987	Ilangeswaran	Padhathi Kesam	M. S. Viswanathan	S. Janaki
1987	Ini Oru Sudhanthiram	Partha Pasikuthadi	Gangai Amaran	S. Janaki
1987	Isaikku Oru Koil	Thirunaalum Varumo Swaami	K. V. Mahadevan	P. Susheela
1987	Ivargal Indiyargal	Ammi Mithikkanum	Gyan Varma	Vani Jairam
1987	Jaathi Pookkal	Vaa Vaa Aadivaa	Shyam	
1987	Kathai Kathaiyam Karanamam	Kaiyai Thanthen Thottukolla	M. S. Viswanathan	Vani Jairam
1987	Kavalan Avan Kovalan	Nizhaledhu Ingge	Vijay Anand	Malaysia Vasudevan
1987	Mupperum Deviyar	Panneeril Oru Pournami	M. S. Viswanathan	S. Janaki
1987	Nalla Pambu	Adi Kaangeyam Kannukkutti	Shankar–Ganesh	
1987	Ore Raththam	Thangame Ingu	Devendran	Uma Ramanan
1987	Poo Poova Poothirukku	Poo Pootha Chediya Kaanom	T. Rajendar	
1987	Rettai Vaal Kuruvi	Suthanthiratha Vaangi Puttom	Ilaiyaraaja	K. S. Chithra & Saibaba
1987	Ullam Kavarntha Kalvan	En Manasa Pari	Ilaiyaraaja	
1987	Ullam Kavarntha Kalvan	Naadirukkum Nilamai	Ilaiyaraaja	
1987	Velicham	Oh My Dear	Manoj–Gyan	Vani Jairam & Dr. Kalyanam
1988	En Thangachi Padichava	Maamanu Solla Oru Aalu	Gangai Amaran	P. Susheela & S. P. Sailaja
1988	En Thangachi Padichava	Poovellam Veedhiyile	Gangai Amaran	
1988	Illam	Aadum Paambu	Ilaiyaraaja	S. P. Sailaja
1988	Kaalaiyum Neeye Maalaiyum Neeye	Sammatham Solla	Devendran	S. Janaki
1988	Kai Naattu	Oorengum Unnai	Chandrabose	Vani Jairam
1988	Kalloori Kanavugal	Thanni Kodatthula	Mani Raja	S. P. Sailaja
1988	Manasukkul Mathappu	Poonthendrale Nee	S. A. Rajkumar	Sunandha
1988	Oorai Therinjikitten	Thalattuven Kanmani	Gangai Amaran	
1988	Senthoora Poove	Sothanai Theeravilla	Manoj–Gyan	
1988	Solla Thudikuthu Manasu	Enathu Vizhi	Ilaiyaraaja	S. Janaki
1988	Thambi Thanga Kambi	Naan Manamagale	Gangai Amaran	Vani Jairam
1988	Thanga Kalasam	Engum Inbam	M. S. Viswanathan	K. S. Chithra
1988	Urimai Geetham	Anju Viral	Gyan Varma	S. Janaki & R. V. Udayakumar
1989	En Purushanthaan Enakku Mattumthaan	Pullai Kooda Paada	Ilaiyaraaja	
1989	En Purushanthaan Enakku Mattumthaan	Poomudithu	Ilaiyaraaja	Sunandha
1989	Nethiyadi	Naan Unakku Paattu	Pandiarajan	S. P. Sailaja
1989	Pick Pocket	Kadhal Thiruda	Ilaiyaraaja	K. S. Chithra
1989	Rajanadai	Kasthoori Maankutty	M. S. Viswanathan	K. S. Chithra
1989	Vizhiyora Kavidhaigal	Sanga Thamizho	Shankar–Ganesh	Vidhya
1989	Varam	Vaanum Mananum	M. S. Viswanathan	Vani Jairam
1990	Aavathellam Pennale	Malaichaaral Oram	Shankar–Ganesh	
1990	Inaindha Kaigal	Andhinera Thendral	Gyan Varma	S. P. Balasubrahmanyam
1990	Kalyana Rasi	Pathinettu Vayadhu	Manoj–Gyan	K. S. Chithra
1990	Pachai Kodi	Ennavadhu Indha	Gangai Amaran	
1990	Pattanamdhan Pogalamadi	Saamakozhi Kooviyaachu	Shankar–Ganesh	S. Janaki
1990	Pudhu Padagan	Vaaraayo Vanna Kili	Kalaipuli S. Thanu	
1990	Pudhu Pudhu Ragangal	Thirunaal Vanthathuda	S. A. Rajkumar	S. A. Rajkumar
1990	Sathyam Sivam Sundaram	Kanne Un Idhazh	Sathyam Sivam Sundaram	P. Susheela
1990	Urudhi Mozhi	Adhikaalai Nilave	Ilaiyaraja	S. Janaki
1991	Archana IAS	Naalu Vaarthai	S. A. Rajkumar	K. S. Chithra
1991	Oorellaam Un Paattu	Noorandu Vaazhum	Ilaiyaraja	
1992	Deiva Vaakku	Oorellam Saamiyaga	Ilaiyaraaja	S. Janaki
1992	Ellaichami	Umai Kuyil Onnu	S. A. Rajkumar	
1992	Idhuthanda Sattam	Azhagana Poonthottam	S. P. Venkatesh	P. Susheela
1992	Pondatti Rajyam	Uchimara Pachakiliye	Deva	
1992	Ponnuketha Purushan	Devathai Vanthaal	Ilaiyaraja	Swarnalatha
1992	Solaiyamma	Merku Thodarchi(Male)	Deva	
1993	Ezhai Jaathi	Ezhai Jaathi	Ilaiyaraaja	
1993	Kizhakku Cheemayile	Kattazham Kattuvazhi	A. R. Rahman	S. Janaki
1993	Pon Vilangu	Oru Kolakili	Ilaiyaraja	Sunanda
1993	Pon Vilangu	Indha Pachakili	Ilaiyaraja	
1994	Atha Maga Rathiname	Alli Alli Thandha Nila	Gangai Amaran	
1994	Chinna Pulla	Ammadi Aathadi	Adithyan	
1994	Kaadhalan	Kollaiyele Thennai	A. R. Rahman	
1994	Karuthamma	Yaar Petha Pillai	A. R. Rahman	
1994	May Madham	En Mel Vizhunda	A. R. Rahman	K. S. Chithra
1994	Periya Marudhu	Elaarukkum Nalla	Ilaiyaraaja	
1994	Sevvanthi	Semmeene Semmeene	Ilaiyaraaja	Sunandha
1994	Thai Maaman	Aazha Samuthiram	Deva	
1994	Vandicholai Chinraasu	Chitthirai Nilavu	A. R. Rahman	Minmini
1995	Pasumpon	Adi Aathi	Vidyasagar	K. S. Chithra & Sujatha Mohan
1996	Poove Unakkaga	Sollamale Yaar Parthathu	S. A. Rajkumar	Sujatha Mohan
1997	Putham Pudhu Poove	Sammanthi Poovukkum	S. A. Rajkumar	
1997	Roja Malare	Udhayathu	Adithyan	
1998	Aval Varuvala	Idhu Kaadhalin Sangeetham	S. A. Rajkumar	
1998	Nilaave Vaa	Kadalamma Kadalamma	Vidyasagar	Vidyasagar & Sujatha Mohan
1999	A. K. 47	Amma	Hamsalekha	
2000	Vaanathaippola	Kadhal Vennila (sad)	S. A. Rajkumar	
2002	Kannathil Muthamittal	Kannathil Muthamittal	A. R. Rahman	Chinmayi
2002	Sundhara Travels	Malliga Poovukku	Bharani	
2002	Sundhara Travels	Nee Santhanam Poosiya	Bharani	
2002	Baba	Rajyama Illai Imayama	A. R. Rahman	
2003	Chokka Thangam	Vellaiyay Manam	Deva	Swarnalatha & Sujatha Mohan
2004	Engal Anna	Konji Konji Pesum	Deva	
2005	Meesai Madhavan	Kabooliwala	Bharani	
2005	Meesai Madhavan	Paal Nilavile	Bharani	
2005	Vetrivel Sakthivel	En Chella Kannamma	Srikanth Deva	K. S. Chithra
2006	Thambi	Poovanathil Maram	Vidyasagar	
2006	Sudesi	Kalyaana Kanavu	Srikanth Deva	Swarnalatha
2007	Kreedam	Kanavellam	G. V. Prakash Kumar	
2018	Amutha	Kannaadi Maalai	Arun Gopan	
2020	Vanmurai	Chinna Poove	Sunny Viswanath	

=== Tamil Christian Devotional Songs ===
- "Uravodu Vaazhum" – Deiva Tharisanam
- "Nanbanukkaga" – Deiva Tharisanam
- "Nilavum Thoongum" – Thaagam
- "Ponmaalai Neram" – Thaagam
- "Amaidhiyin Thoothanay" –
- "Enathu Vizhiyil Unathu Paarvai" –
- "Amaithi Thedi Alaiyum Nenjame" – Paathai

=== Malayalam Songs ===
( This list contains only a few top songs sung by Jayachandran. He has sung thousands of songs in Malayalam and a larger list is available at the malayalam wiki-page https://ml.wikipedia.org/wiki/പി._ജയചന്ദ്രൻ)

- "Manjalayil Mungi Thorthi" – Kalithozhan
- "Aalilathaaliyumaayi" - Mizhi Randilum
- "Aaraarum Kaanaathe" - Chandrolsavam
- "Keranirakalaadum" - Jalolsavam
- "Shishirakaala Meghamidhuna" - Devaraagam
- "Therirangum Mukile" – Mazhathullikilukkam
- "Olanjali Kuruvi" – 1983
- "Ithaloornnu Veena" – Thanmathra
- "Praayam Nammil" - Niram
- "Harshbashpam Thooki" – Muthassi
- "Malarvaka kombath" – Ennum Eppozhum
- "Kathayamama" – Kerala Cafe
- "Ariyathe Ariyathe" – Ravanaprabhu
- "Pattil Ee Pattil" – Pranayam
- "Sharadambaram" – Ennu Ninte Moideen
- "Mannappm chuttu" – Marubhoomiyile Aana
- "Veendum Makara nilavu" – Bharya swantam suhruthu
- "Podi meesha" – Pa Va
- "Poonellin kathirola" -Nothing but life
- "Neeyoru Puzhayayi" – Thilakkam
- "Poove Poove" – Devadoothan
- "Aaru Paranju" – Pulival Kalyanam
- "Mazhavannu" – Puzhikkadakan
- Aatuthottil – Athiran
- "Kalabhachuvaru Vecha Meda" – Aval Oru Thudar Katha
- "Peyneer Poley" – Otta
- "Premikumbol neeyum njanum" – Salt N' Pepper
- "Kannil kaashi" – Dreams
- "Enthe Innum Vanneela" – Gramophone
- "Njaanoru Malayalee" – Jilebi

=== Kannada songs ===
Year	Film	Song	Composer
1980	Hanthakana Sanchu	"Jeevana Sanjeevana"	Vijaya Bhaskar
1981	Ranganayaki	"Mandara Pushpavu"	M. Ranga Rao
1981	Muniyana Madari	"Kalgejje Thalake"	Rajan-Nagendra
1982	Maanasa Sarovara	"Chanda Chanda"	Vijaya Bhaskar
1982	Praya Praya Praya	"Bhoomi Thayane Nee Ishta"	Upendra Kumar
1983	Bhakta Prahladha	"Kamala Nayana"	M. Rangarao
1984	Amrutha Ghalige	"Hindusthanvu endu mareyada"	Vijaya Bhaskar
1984	Masanada Hoovu	"Kannada Naadina Karavali"	Vijaya Bhaskar
1987	Olavina Udugore	"Olavina Udugore"	M. Rangarao

- "Kala mattomme Namagagi (Kiladigalu)"
- "Alukade Balukutha (Kiladigalu)"
- "Savira Hoogalali (Suvarna Sethuve)"
- "Uyyale Adona Banniro (Dharani Mandala Madhyadolage)"
- "Uppina Saagaraku (Masanada Hoovu)"
- "Sridevi Madhavi Kannota Beda (Ganeshana Madhuve)"
- "Premada Shruthi Meetide (Ganeshana Maduve)"
- "Manasu Kaleyithu (Raithana Makkalu)"

=== Malayalam music albums ===
- Pranayamarmaram – 2009.

=== Hindi songs ===
- "Milo Wahan Wahan" (from movie ADA, Debut song in Hindi)

=== Telugu Discography ===
Year	Film	Song	Composer
1982	Evaru Veeru Evaru Veeru	"Idhi Maatalu Raani Vela"	Ramesh Naidu
1982	Evaru Veeru Evaru Veeru	"Kalavu Vache Vela Ani"	Ramesh Naidu
1982	Evaru Veeru Evaru Veeru	"Ippude Thelisindhi"	Ramesh Naidu
1982	O aadadhi O Magaadu	"O Magadu O Aadadhi"	M. S. Viswanathan
1983	Subha Muhurtham	"Nee Choopu"	Chakravarthy
1984	Ooha Sundari	"Adharam Entha Madhuram"	Chakravarthy
1984	Swathi	"Chamanthi Poola Mokka"	Chakravarthy
1984	Swathi	"Pagalantha Gaganaaniki"	Chakravarthy
1985	Ee Tharam Illalu	"Raagam Madhuram"	Ilaiyaraaja
1987	Thalli Godavari	"Rathiri Sagam Ayyevela"	Ramesh Naidu
1989	Two Town Rowdy	"Vaddhura Niddhara"	Raj–Koti
1994	Vanitha	"Ye Thalli Kannadani"	A. R. Rahman
1994	Premikudu	"Muttukunte Kandipoye"	A. R. Rahman
1995	Errodu	"Yedari Seemalalo"	Vandemataram Srinivas
1996	Gunshot	"Pichi Gaali Vachi Paddadhi"	S. V. Krishna Reddy
1996	Gunshot	"Yedho Mamatha"	S. V. Krishna Reddy
1996	Nalla Poosalu	"Dandgaa Maraka Mundhe"	Vandemataram Srinivas
1997	Osi Naa Maradhala	"Aha Emi Thaluku"	M. M. Keeravani
1998	Suryavamsam	"Rojave Chinni"(Male)	S. A. Rajkumar
1998	Suswagatham	"Happy Happy"	S. A. Rajkumar
1999	Alludugaaru Vachcharu	"Chali Chalani"	M. M. Keeravani
2000	Nuvve Kavali	"Anaganaga Aakasam"	Koti
2000	Sri Srimati Satyabhama	"Neeli Neeli Meghala"	S. V. Krishna Reddy
2001	Prema Sandadi	"Karanamagri Pakkintiloni"	Koti
2002	Baba	"Rajyama Sanyasama"	A. R. Rahman
2002	Neetho	"Dil Dil Dil"	Vidhya Sagar
2002	Neetho Cheppalani	"Ammaye Orakanta"	Koti
2002	Vooru Manadhira	"Naa Chelli Chandramma"	Koti

== Filmography as actor ==
Krishna Parunthu 1979 movie

.Nakhakshathangal – As Neighbour – Directed by Hariharan

.Trivandrum Lodge – As Narayanan Nair – Directed by VK Prakash

Lekhayude Maranam Oru Flashback (1983) – directed by KG George as himself in the song scene "Prabhaamayi, Prabhaamayi"

== Awards ==
National Film Awards

- 1985 – Best Male Play Back Singer for the Malayalam film Sree Narayana Guru

Kerala State Film Awards

- 1972 – Best Male Play Back Singer for the song "Suprabhatham" in the film Pani Theeratha Veedu
- 1978 – Best Male Play Back Singer for the song "Ragam Sreeragam" in the film Bandhanam
- 1999 – Best Male Play Back Singer for the song "Prayam Nammil" in the film Niram
- 2004 – Best Male Play Back Singer for the song "Neeyoru Puzhayaay" in the film Thilakkam
- 2015 – Best Male Play Back Singer for the songs "Njaan Oru Malayali", "Malarvaka Kombathu", "Sharadambaram" in the films Jilebi, Ennum Eppozhum, Ennu Ninte Moideen
- 2020 – J. C. Daniel Award for his outstanding contributions to Malayalam cinema

Tamil Nadu State Film Awards

- 1994 – Best Male Playback Singer – for the song "Kattazham Kattuvazhi" in the film Kizhakku Cheemayile
- 1998 – Kalaimamani Award by Tamil Nadu Government for 30 Years in Tamil Film Music

Asianet Film Awards

- 2001 – Best Male Playback – Raavanaprabhu
- 1999 – Best Male Playback – Niram

Other awards

- 1958 – First place in Mridangam and Second place in Light music competitions at Kerala School Kalolsavam
- 2000 – Swaralaya Kairali Yesudas Award
- 2011 – Kamukara Award instituted by Kamukara Foundation
- 2014 – Harivarasanam Award
- 2014 – K. P. Udayabhanu Award by K. P. Udayabhanu Foundation
- 2015 – Kerala Film Critics Association Award for Best Male Playback Singer – Sharadambaram (Ennu Ninte Moideen)
- 2017 – Mazhavil Mango Music Award for Best Singer – Podimeesha (Pa Va)
- 2021 – Lifetime Achievement Award by Mazhavil Music Awards
- 2022 – K. Raghavan Master Foundation Award for his comprehensive contribution to the field of music.
- 2022 – Geetham Sangeetham National Award instituted by the Geetham Sangeetham Kalasamskarika Vedi, is given for overall contribution to music.
- 2022 – Sreekumaran Thampi Foundation Award
