= Kailas Nath =

Indian actor (died 2023)

- Born: 1957 or 1958; Mannar, Kerala, India
- Died: 3 August 2023 (aged 65); Kochi, Kerala, India
- Occupations: Actor; director
- Years active: 1977–2023
- Spouse: Ajitha
- Children: 1

Kailas Nath (1957 or 1958 – 3 August 2023) was an Indian actor and director who primarily worked in Malayalam and Tamil films, and also appeared in television serials. He made his film debut with Sangamam (1977) and acted in over 160 films during a career spanning nearly 45 years.

== Early life ==
Kailas was born in Mannar in the Alappuzha district of Kerala, India. He graduated from Devaswom Board Pampa College and later attended a film institute, where he studied alongside Nassar, Shankar, and Chiranjeevi.

== Career ==
Before entering the film industry, Kailas was active in mimicry and stage performances. He began his film career with the 1977 Malayalam film Sangamam and made his Tamil debut in Oru Thalai Ragam (1980), eventually appearing in nearly 90 Tamil films. His films include Vidarunna Mottukal (1977), Etho Oru Swapnam (1978), Swandam Enna Padam (1980), Irattimadhuram (1982), Saravarsham (1982), Valli (1993), Sethurama Iyer CBI (2004), Mizhikal Sakshi (2008), Seetha Kalyanam (2009), and Yugapurushan (2010). He also worked as an assistant director under Sreekumaran Thampi before making his directorial debut with Ithu Nalla Thamasha in 1985. In addition, he lectured in acting at Madras Christian College.

Apart from films, he appeared in several Malayalam television serials, beginning with Seemantham. His television work includes Minnukettu, Ente Manasaputhri, Pranayam, and Vanambadi. His final on-screen appearance was in the Asianet series Santhwanam.

== Personal life and death ==
Kailas was married to Ajitha, and they have one daughter. He died on 3 August 2023, at the age of 65, from non-alcoholic liver cirrhosis at a private hospital in Kochi.

== Filmography ==
=== As actor ===
Year	Title	Role	Notes	Ref.
1977	Sangamam		Debut film	
1977	Vidarunna Mottukal	Chandran	Child artist	
1978	Etho Oru Swapnam	Abhayan		
1979	Maalika Paniyunnavar	Appunni		
1979	Venalil Oru Mazha			
1980	Oru Thalai Ragam	Thambu	Tamil debut	
1980	Ambalavilakku			
1980	Swandam Enna Padam	Kochu Kuttan		
1980	Vaiki Vanna Vasantham			
1981	Palaivana Solai	Vasu	Tamil film	
1982	Gaanam			
1982	Saravarsham	Dr. Varma		
1982	Enikkum Oru Divasam			
1982	Irattimadhuram	Suman		
1983	Kingini Kombu			
1992	Kizhakkan Pathrose	Settu's assistant		
1993	Valli		Tamil film	
2004	Sethurama Iyer CBI	Ambiswamy		
2008	Mizhikal Sakshi	Melshanti		
2009	Seetha Kalyanam			
2010	Yugapurushan	Chattampi Swamikal		
2014	Test Paper			
2015	Maayaapuri		3D film	

=== As director ===
Year	Title	Notes	Ref.
1985	Ithu Nalla Thamasha	Directorial debut	

== Television ==
Year(s)	Title	Role	Network	Ref.
1998–1999	Seemantham	—N/a	DD Malayalam	
	Purappadu	—N/a	DD Malayalam	
2004–2009	Minnukettu	—N/a	Surya TV	
2007–2010	Ente Manasaputhri	—N/a	Asianet	
2011–2012	Autograph	Poduval	Asianet	
2015–2017	Pranayam	Viswanatha Iyer	Asianet	
2015	Manasariyathe	—N/a	Surya TV	
2015–2016	Malootty	—N/a	Mazhavil Manorama	
2016–2019	Ennu Swantham Jani	—N/a	Surya TV	
2017–2020	Vanambadi	Vasudevan	Asianet	
2020–2023	Santhwanam	Narayana Pillai	Asianet	
