= Kurattikkadu =

- village
- Location in Kerala, India Kurattikkadu (India)
- Coordinates: 9°19′0″N 76°32′0″E
- Country: India
- State: Kerala
- District: Alappuzha

Languages
  - Official: Malayalam, English
- Time zone: UTC+5:30 (IST)
- Vehicle registration: KL-
- Coastline: 0 kilometres (0 mi)
- Climate: Tropical monsoon (Köppen)
- Avg. summer temperature: 35 °C (95 °F)
- Avg. winter temperature: 20 °C (68 °F)

Kurattikkadu is the main part of Mannar town situated in Alappuzha district in Kerala, India. It is situated on the banks of the Pampa River. Many institutions like Mannar Panchayath Office, Mannar Village Office, Mannar Panchayath Library, National Granthasala, and Village Extension Office are situated in Kurattikkadu. Mannar is situated at only 10 km from Chengannur, Thiruvalla, Haripad and Mavelikara. Mannar is connected via 4 railway stations (Chengannur, Thiruvalla, Harippad and Mavelikara) at a distance of 10 km each on four sides.

== Bronze industry ==
The place is well known for its bronze industry. Kurattikkadu is known for vessels, lamps, bells and other objects made out of brass, bronze and other metals. There are hundreds of traditional 'ALA'S' in Kurattikkadu. Also there are many small scale manufacturing establishments engaged in this business, employing traditional workers. Craftsmen from this town has created a lot of world class products like Worlds biggest Varpu displayed at Delhi Museum, Worlds biggest Church Lamp at Kuravilangad Church, Worlds biggest Temple Lamp of Chettikulangara Devi Temple, Worlds biggest Temple Bell at Simla Temple, Worlds biggest Church Bell at Cathedral Church New Delhi and replica of the famous "Tree of life and Knowledge" lamp are few among them. Mannar boasts the reputation of being second destination in India for these metal products, second only to market leader manufacturing city Moradabad.

== Religion ==
Pattambalam Devi Temple, Pattambalam, Thevarikkal Mahadeva Kshethram, and Mutharamman Kovil are some of the important religious places in Kurattikkadu. The Anpoli, is conducted as part of festival in various temples in Mannar. Among the Anpoli festivals Anpoli Areeppara Mahothsavam of Pattambalam Devi Kshethram is the most famous one, attracting thousands of devotees on 24th of Medam (7 May). Here Bhadrakali are worshipped . The festival at Pattambalam starts on Medam 10th (23 April) and ends on Medam 25th (8 May). The festival includes several rituals like AttilChattam, Changayilottam, Vithideel are not found anywhere else in the world. Among these AttilChattam attracts Muslim devotees, also. To know more about visit pattambalam and click on legends. Here the Goddess Bhadrakali is also called as Valiya Amma which means Great Mother.

== Education ==
The place also has educational institutions like Sree Bhuvaneswari Higher Secondary School managed by Kurattikkadu Pattambalam Devi Temple.

== See also ==
- Mannar
- Alappuzha
- Kerala
- India
- Pattambalam
