= Mannar Thrikkuratti Mahadeva Temple =

Hindu temple in Kerala, India

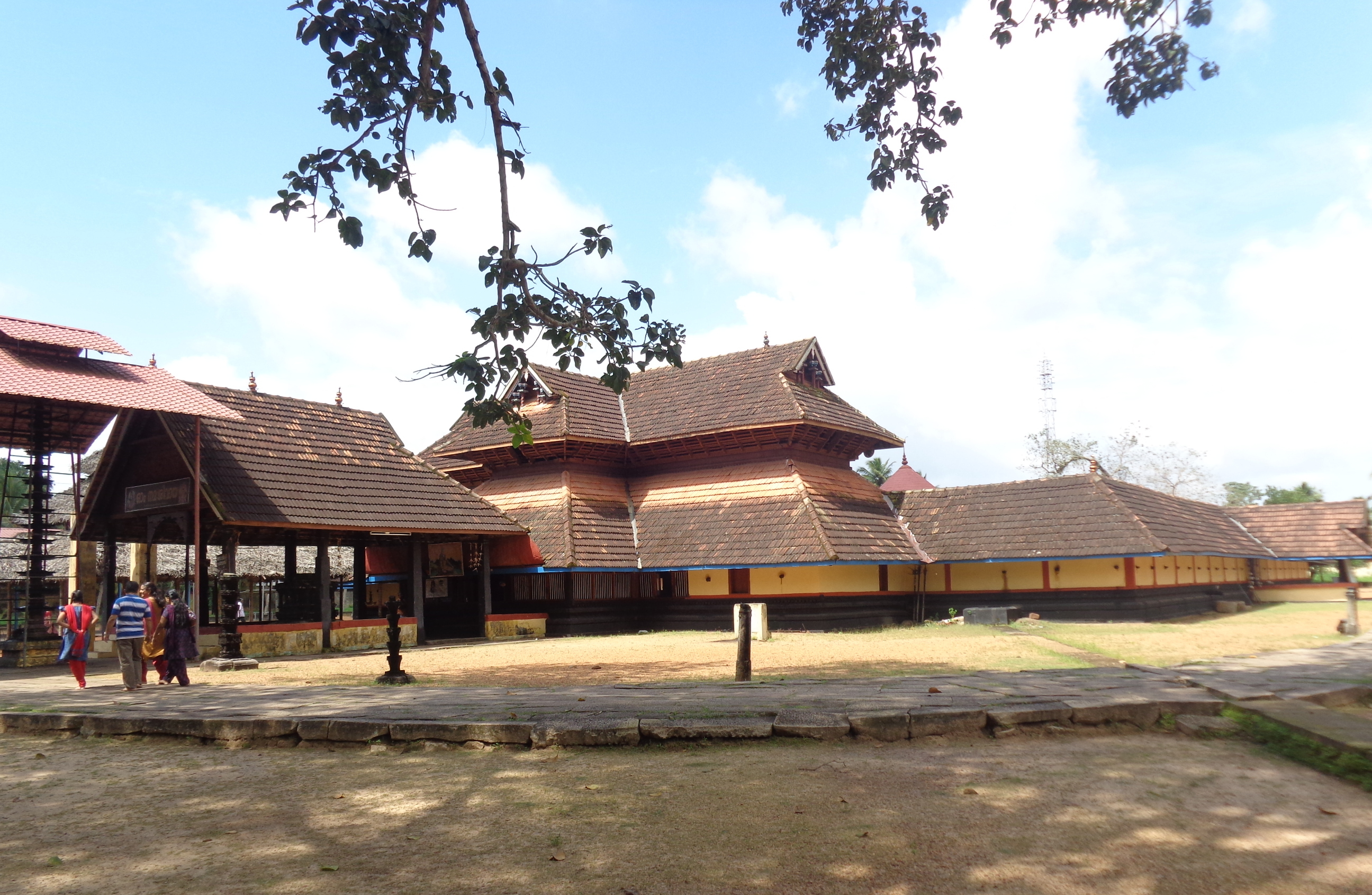
- Main Temple Structure

- Thrikkuratti Mahadeva Temple, Mannar, Alappuzha, Kerala

Religion
- Affiliation: Hinduism
- District: Alappuzha
- Deity: Shiva, Krishna
- Festival: Maha Shivaratri

Location
- Location: Mannar, Parumala
- State: Kerala
- Country: India
- Interactive map of Mannar Thrikkuratti Mahadeva Temple
- Coordinates: 9.3195895°N 76.5337397°E

Architecture
- Type: Kerala style
- Creator: Chera Dynasty
- Completed: Not known (believed to be thousands of years old)

Specifications
- Temple: One
- Monument: 2

Mannar Thrikkuratti Mahadeva Temple an ancient Hindu temple dedicated to Shiva is situated on the banks of the Pampa river at Mannar of Alappuzha in Kerala state in India. The presiding deity of the temple is Shiva, located in main sanctum sanatorium, facing East. According to folklore, sage Parashurama has installed the idol. The temple is one of the 108 famous Shiva temples in Kerala. It is believed that the mammoth temple compound wall was built by a troupe of Bhootas of Lord Paramasiva in one night. The temple was built by King Maandhatha of Ishyaku Dynasty (Sooryavamsam).

== See also ==
- 108 Shiva Temples
- Temples of Kerala
- Annamanada Thrikkuratti Mahadeva Temple

== Gallery ==
Various Photos of Thrikkuratti Mahadeva Temple, Mannar

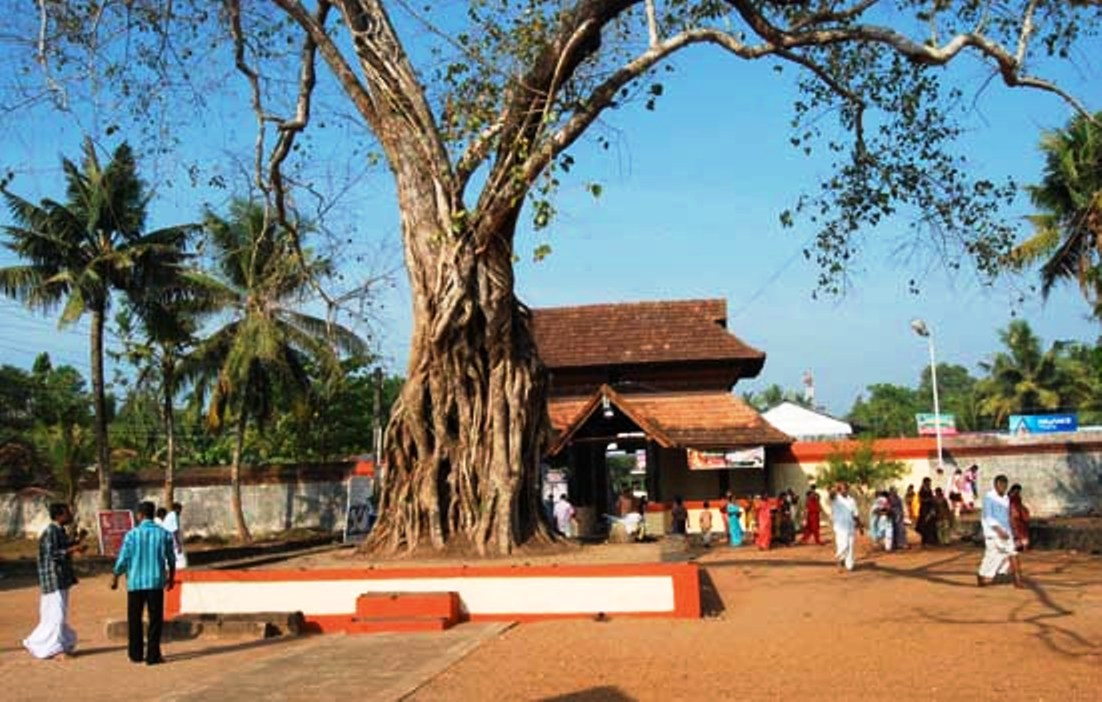
Temple west Tower

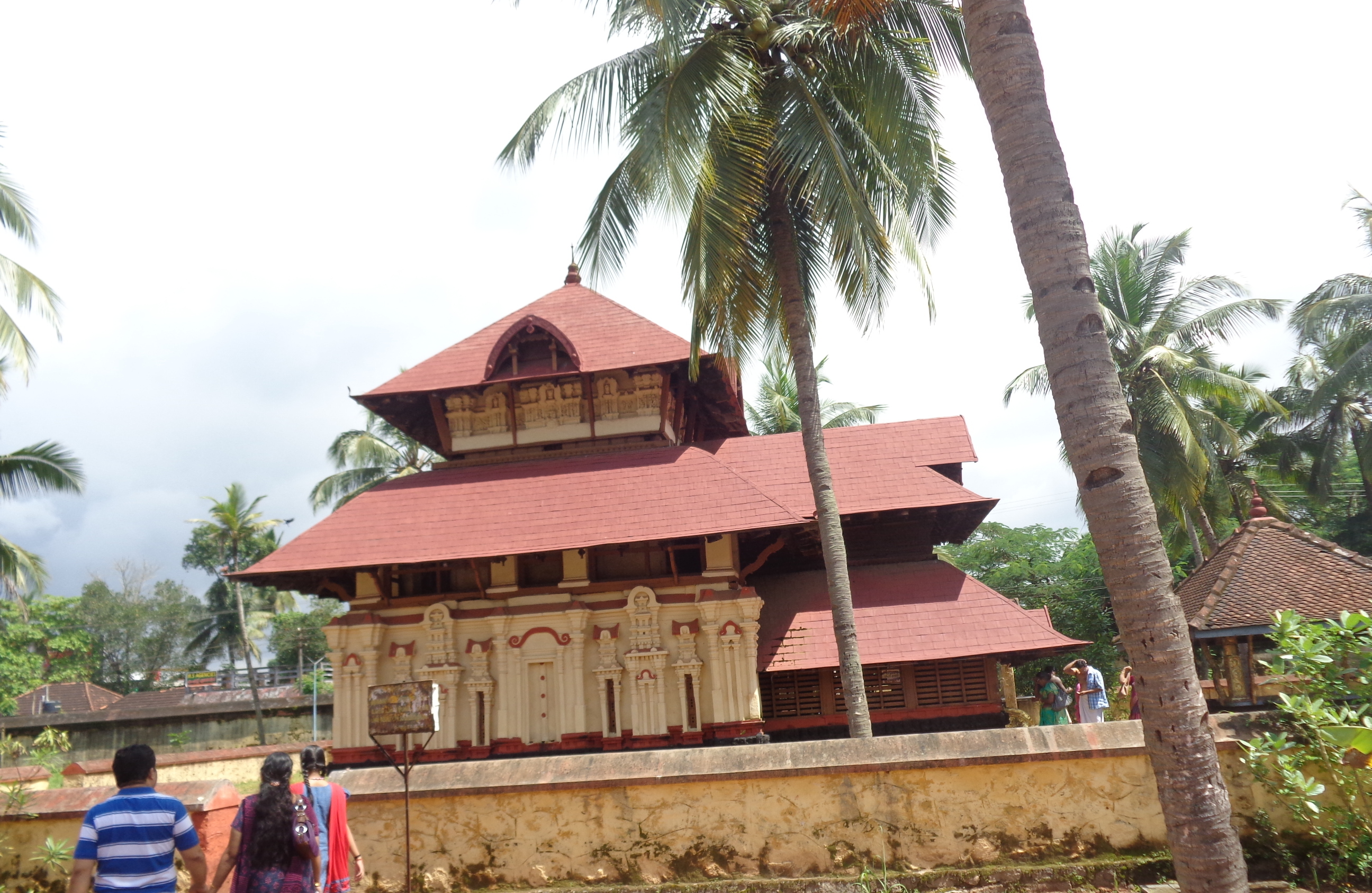
Krishna Temple Srikovil

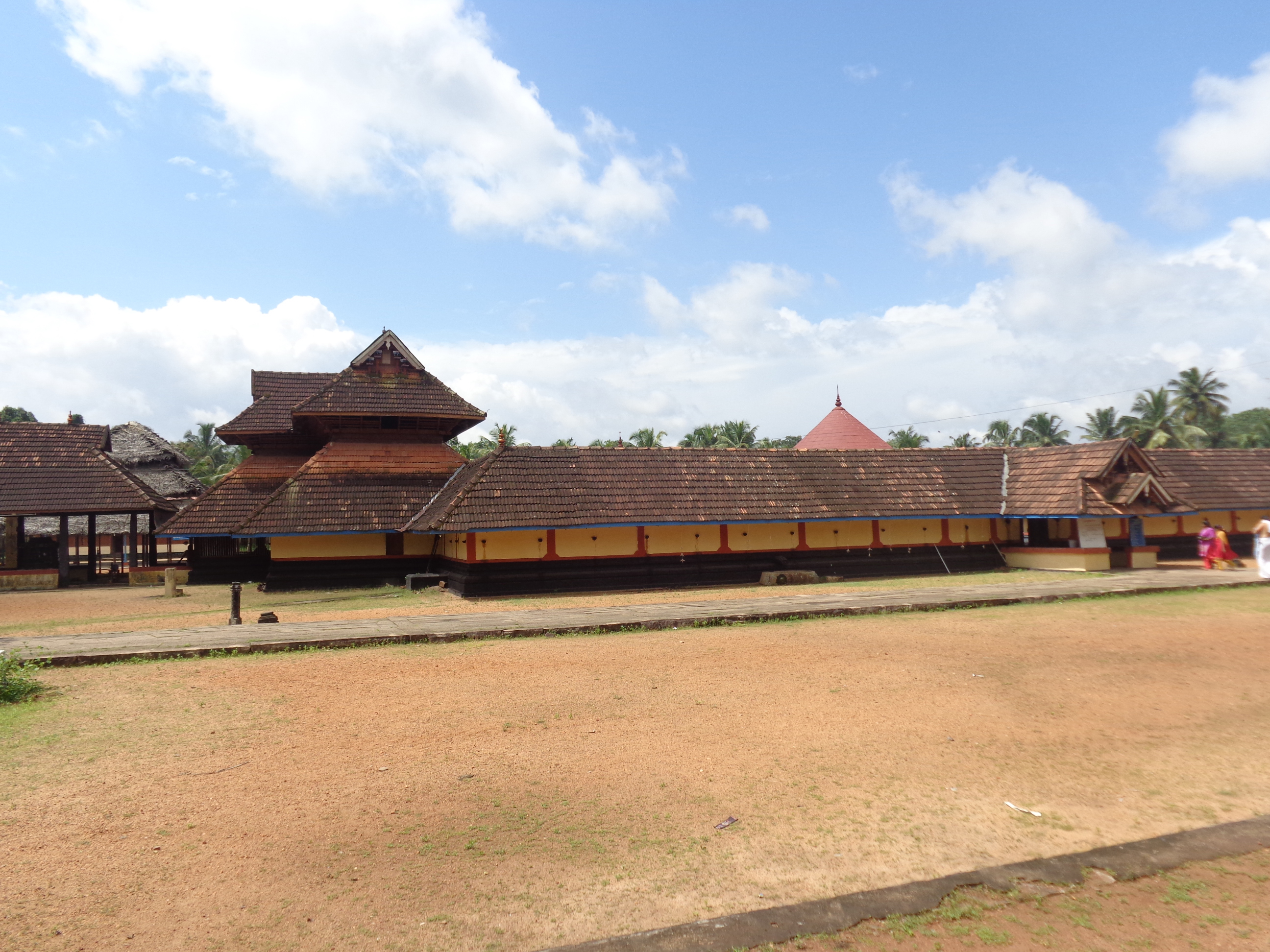
Nalabalam

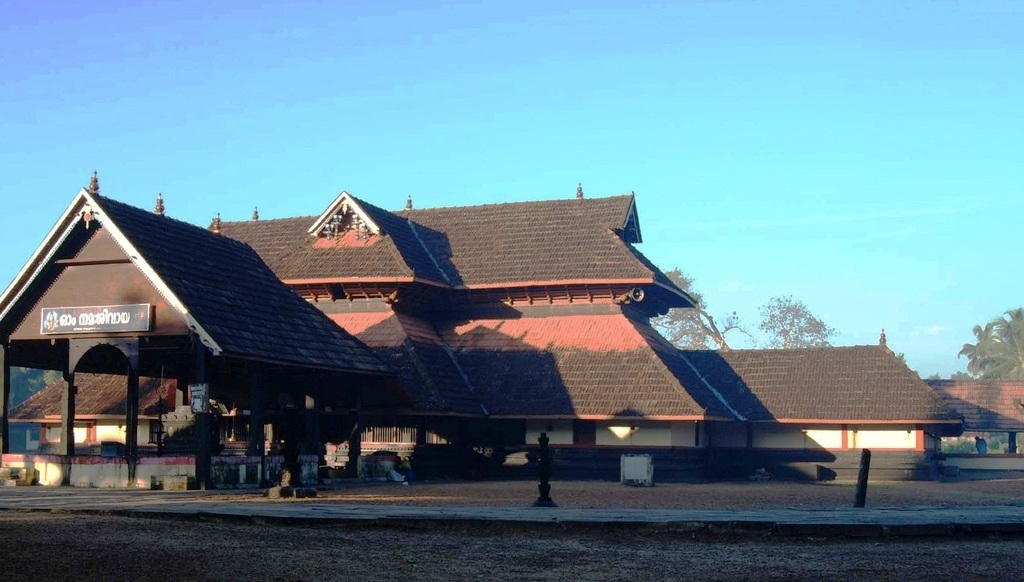
East Ambalavattom

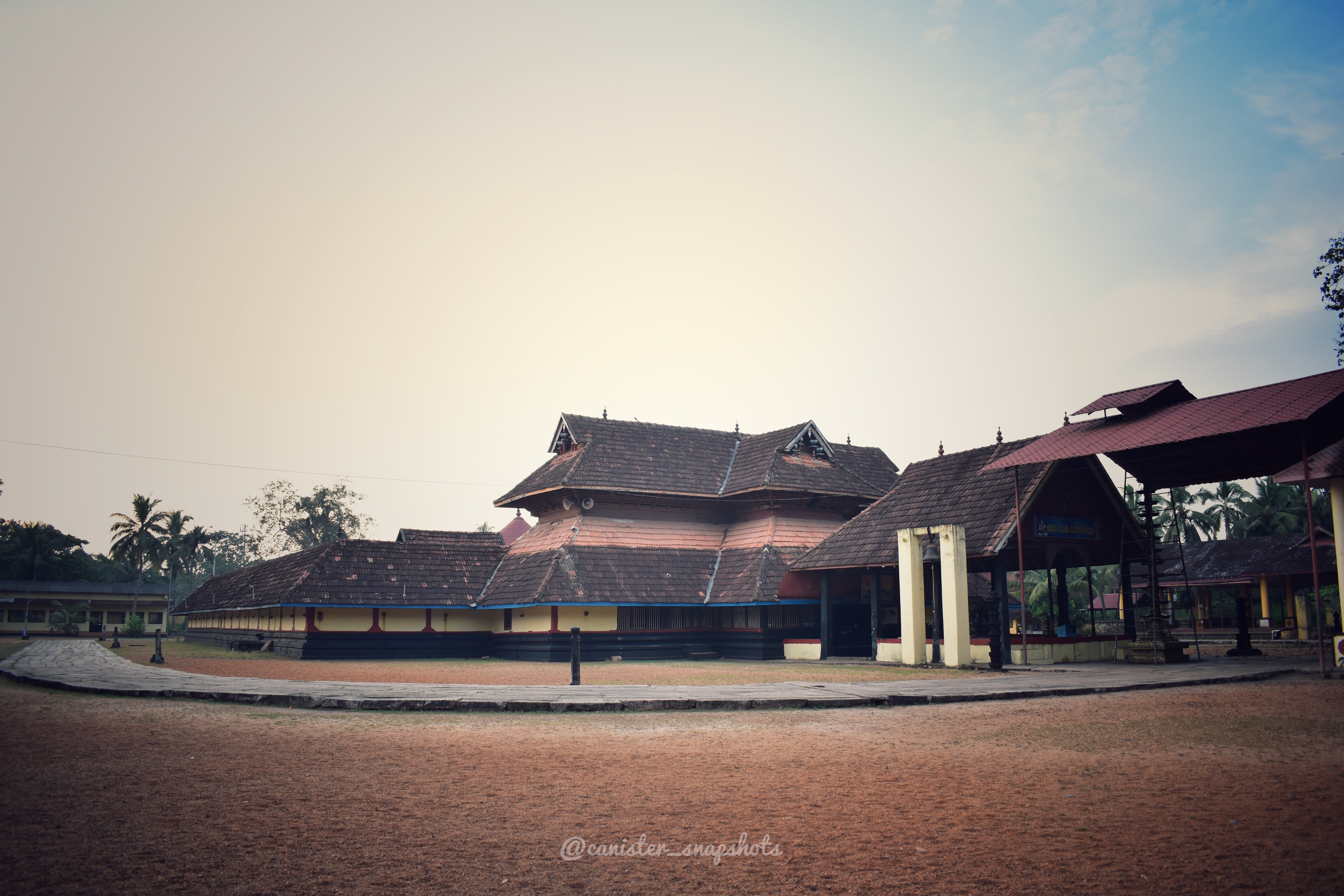
East Ambalavattom

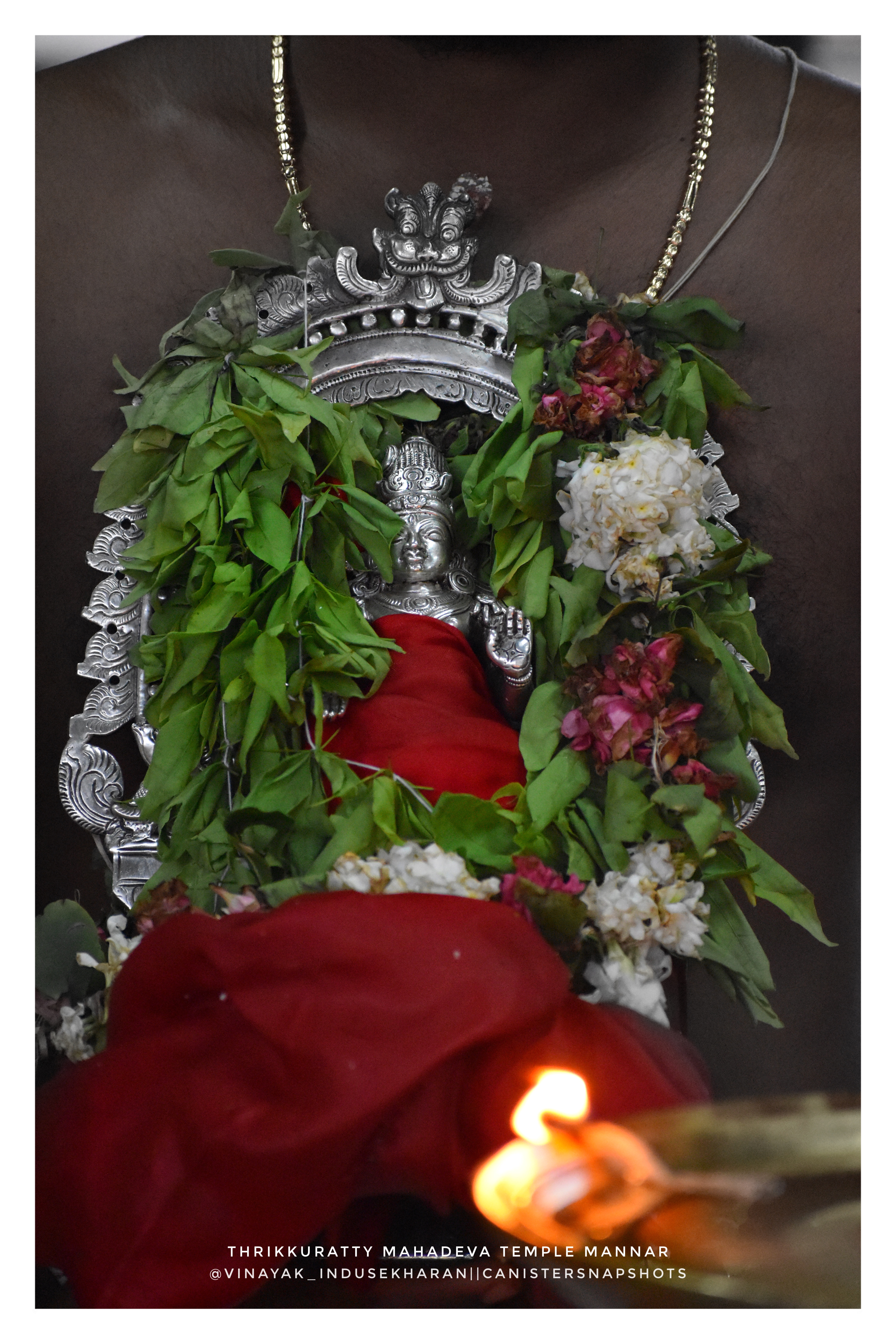
Shiva amulet
