= Vidarunna Mottukal =

Indian film by P. Subramaniam

- Directed by: P. Subramaniam
- Written by: Nagavally R. S. Kurup
- Screenplay by: Nagavally R. S. Kurup
- Produced by: P. Subramaniam for Neela Productions
- Starring: Madhu; Kaviyoor Ponnamma; Raghavan; Baby Sumathi
- Cinematography: N. A. Thara
- Edited by: Gopalakrishnan
- Music by: G. Devarajan
- Production company: Merryland Studio
- Distributed by: Kumaraswamy & Co.
- Release date: 1 December 1977
- Country: India
- Language: Malayalam

Vidarunna Mottukal is a 1977 Indian Malayalam-language children's film, produced and directed by P. Subramaniam under the banner Neela Productions. This children's film bagged a special award for its Director P. Subramaniam in the Kerala State Film awards in the year 1977.

The film stars Madhu, Kaviyoor Ponnamma, Raghavan, Master Santhoshkumar, Kailasnath, S. P. Pillai, Thikkurissi, Pappu, Vanchiyoor Madhavan Nair, Sunny, Ayiroor Sathyan, Kundarabhasi, Chavara V. P. Nair, C. I. Paul, Vijayakumar, N. S. Vanchiyoor, R. C. Nair, Thoppil Ramachandran, Udayan, Sathyan, Master Sai Kumar, Master Rajiv Rangan, Master Jose, Master Ajayakumar, Baby Sumathi, Baby Bindu, Baby Kavitha, Asha Raghavan, Ayisha, Junior Sheela, Pramila Chandran, Rathirani, Baby Swapna, Sajanachandran, Baby Lani Antony, Dr. K. R. Namboothiri, Anandvalli, Kaviyoor Ponnamma, Aranmula Ponnamma, Mallika, Radhamani, Lalithasri, Lalitha, Vijayalakshmi and Baby Ammbika. The film has musical score by G. Devarajan. This was the debut film of Malayalam actress Menaka.

== Cast ==
- Madhu as Headmaster Sathyaseelan
- Kaviyoor Ponnamma as Lakshmi
- Raghavan as Gopal
- Baby Sumathi as Kanchana
- Kailas Nath as Chandran (Child Artist)
- Mallika Sukumaran as School teacher
- Sai Kumar as Vikraman (Child Artist)
- KPAC Sunny as Sulu's husband
- Radhamani as Sulu
- Ambika as Sumam (Child artist)
- Anandavally as Ammini
- Chavara V. P. Nair as Doctor
- S. P. Pillai as Pappan Pillai
- C. I. Paul as Hassan
- Kuthiravattam Pappu as Madhupan
- Lalithasree as Kamakshi
- Aranmula Ponnamma as Gopal's mother
- Vijayalakshmi as Muthassi
- Kalpana as Child artist
- Urvashi as Child artist

== Soundtrack ==
The music was composed by G. Devarajan and the lyrics were written by Sreekumaran Thampi and Bankim Chandra Chatterji.

No.	Song	Singers	Lyrics	Length (m:ss)
1	"Kaattiloru Malarkkulam"	Chorus, Santha, M. S. Rajeswari	Sreekumaran Thampi	
2	"Sabarmathithan Sangeetham"	P. Madhuri, Chorus, Karthikeyan	Sreekumaran Thampi	
3	"Vande Maatharam"	K. J. Yesudas, P. Madhuri, Karthikeyan	Bankim Chandra Chatterji	
4	"Vande Maatharam" [Version 2]	Chorus	Bankim Chandra Chatterji	
5	"Vidarunna Mottukal"		Sreekumaran Thampi	
