= Karazhma =

Karazhma Chennithala
- village
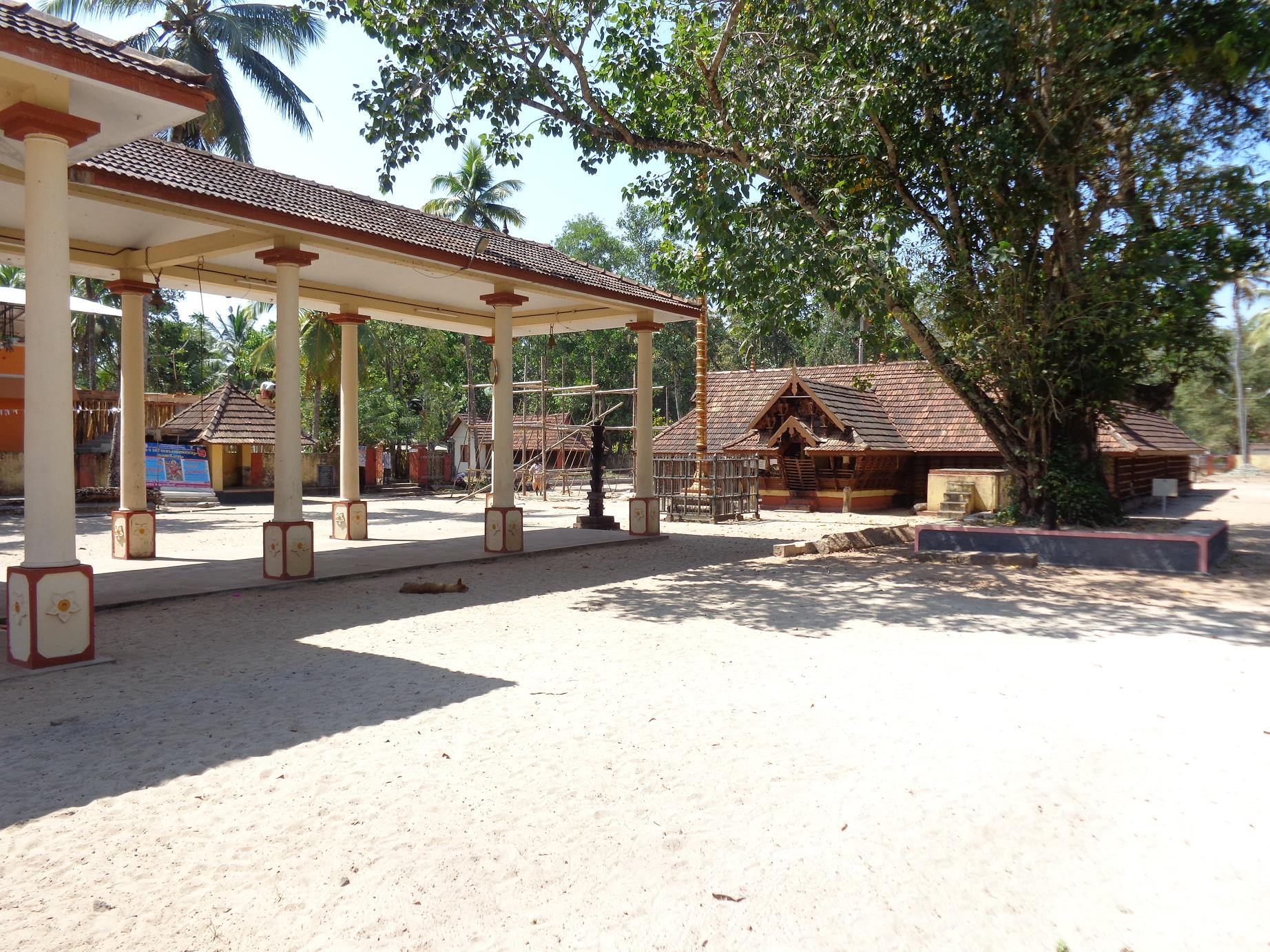
- Karazhma Devi temple
- Interactive map of Karazhma
- Coordinates: 9°16′0″N 76°32′0″E
- Country: India
- State: Kerala
- District: Alappuzha

Languages
  - Official: Malayalam, English
- Time zone: UTC+5:30 (IST)
- Vehicle registration: KL-
- Nearest city: Mavelikara
- Lok Sabha constituency: Mavelikara

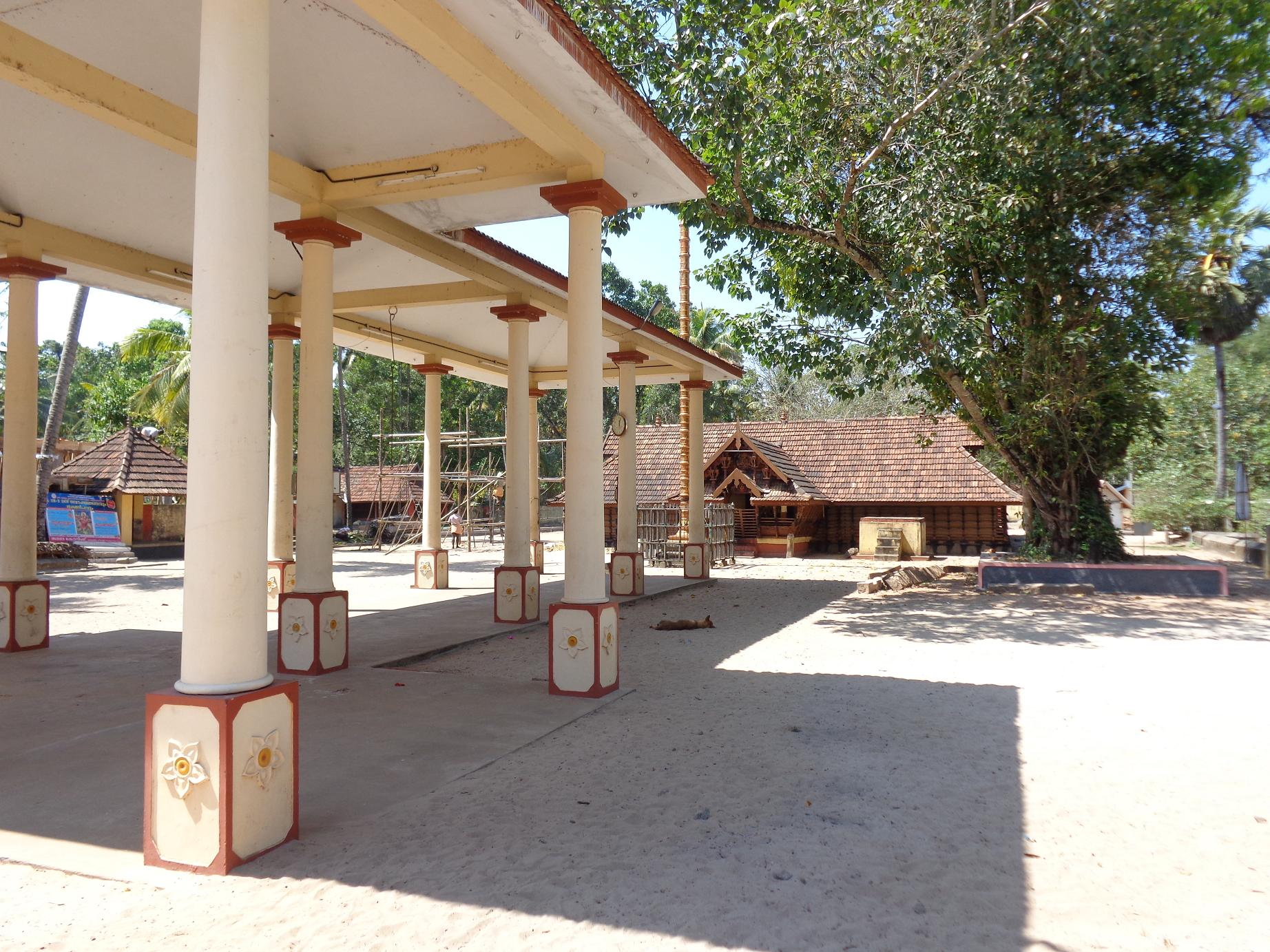
Devi Temple, another view

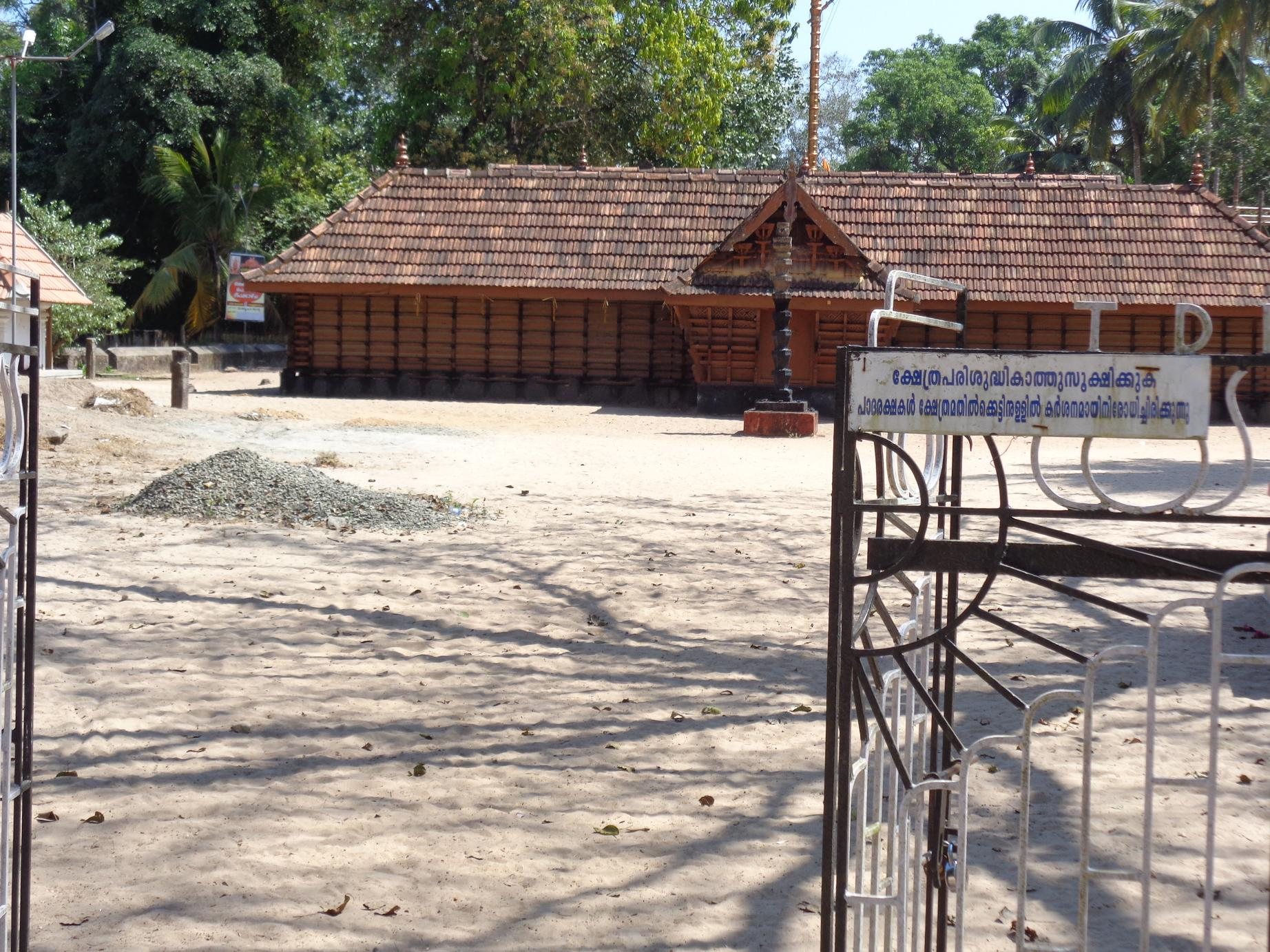
Devi Temple, front view

Karazhma is a small village in the Alappuzha district of Kerala, India. Karazma is located in the Chennithala Punchayat and is the site of Karazhma Bhagvati Temple. Karazhma is bordered by Mavelikara - Thiruvalla road in the West, a beautiful river in the east, lush paddy fields in the north and marshes in the south. Karazhma has a good mix of Christian and Hindu population that comprises its local inhabitants.

== Karazhma kottaram ==
Karazhma Kottaram or Karazhma Palace (in English) is an ancient palace located at Mannar panchayath, Chengannur Taluk of Alapuzha District, Kerala State, India.

The family belongs to Panangattu Kovilakam of Beypore, near Calicut, Kerala State of India.
