= Ithu Nalla Thamasha =

Ithu Nalla Thamasa
- Directed by: Kailas Nath
- Written by: M. P. Rajeevan (dialogues)
- Produced by: Sreekumaran Thampi
- Starring: Sukumari; Jagathy Sreekumar; Kalpana; Santhosh
- Edited by: L. Bhoominathan
- Music by: K. P. Udayabhanu
- Production company: Bhavani Rajeswari
- Distributed by: Bhavani Rajeswari
- Release date: 28 May 1985
- Country: India
- Language: Malayalam

Ithu Nalla Thamasa is a 1985 Indian Malayalam film, directed by Kailas Nath and produced by Sreekumaran Thampi. The film stars Sukumari, Jagathy Sreekumar, Kalpana and Santhosh in the lead roles. The film has musical score by K. P. Udayabhanu.

== Cast ==
- Sukumari as Kalyaniyamma
- Jagathy Sreekumar as Basheer Pilla
- Kalpana as Sundari/Gracy
- Santhosh as Vijayakrishnan/Kuttapppan
- Anuradha as SI Prasanna
- K. P. A. C. Azeez as SP J. Ashok
- K. P. Ummer as Meesa Vasupilla
- Nylex Nalini as Lalnamani
- Poojappura Ravi as Kumaran Vaidyar
- T. G. Ravi as Ouseph Muthalali
- Kailasanath as Savala

== Soundtrack ==
The music was composed by K. P. Udayabhanu and the lyrics were written by Sreekumaran Thampi.

No.	Song	Singers	Lyrics	Length (m:ss)
1	"Ithu Nalla Thamaasha"	K. J. Yesudas, Chorus	Sreekumaran Thampi	
2	"Kopam Kollumbol"	Krishnachandran	Sreekumaran Thampi	
