= Mohiniyaattam (film) =

- Poster
- Directed by: Sreekumaran Thampi
- Written by: Sreekumaran Thampi
- Screenplay by: Sreekumaran Thampi
- Starring: Adoor Bhasi; Lakshmi; T. R. Omana; Nilambur Balan
- Cinematography: P. S. Nivas
- Edited by: K. Sankunni
- Music by: G. Devarajan
- Production company: Ragamalika
- Distributed by: Ragamalika
- Release date: 22 October 1976
- Country: India
- Language: Malayalam

Mohiniyaattam is a 1976 Indian Malayalam film, directed by Sreekumaran Thampi. The film stars Adoor Bhasi, Lakshmi, T. R. Omana and Nilambur Balan in the lead roles. The film has musical score by G. Devarajan. P. S. Nivas won the National Film Award for Best Cinematography for the film. The film won three Filmfare Awards South.

== Cast ==
- Adoor Bhasi as Krishnan
- Lakshmi as Mohini
- T. R. Omana as Nalini
- Nilambur Balan as Panikker
- P. N. Menon as Artist K. M. Panicker
- Maniyanpilla Raju as Job hunter
- Babu Nanthankode as Prospected groom
- K. P. Ummer as Narendran
- Kanakadurga as Anasooya
- M. G. Soman as Venu
- Mallika Sukumaran as Ranjini
- Master Rajakumaran Thampi as Young Chinthu
- T. P. Madhavan as Nalini's husband
- Jagathy Sreekumar as Ranjini's lover
- Vijayan as Reporter Kutty
- Vanchiyoor Radha as Nirmala's Aunt
- Mancheri Chandran as Hotel Receptionist
- P. R. Menon as Industrialist
- Prathapachandran as Raghavan Nair
- Haripppad Soman as House maid
- Girija as Sreedevi
- Master Sekhar as Chintu

== Soundtrack ==
The music was composed by G. Devarajan and the lyrics were written by Sreekumaran Thampi and Jayadevar.

No.	Song	Singers	Lyrics	Length (m:ss)
1	"Aaranmula Bhagavaante"	P. Jayachandran	Sreekumaran Thampi	
2	"Kanneeru Kandaal"	P. Madhuri	Sreekumaran Thampi	
3	"Radhika Krishna"	Mannur Rajakumaranunni	Jayadevar	
4	"Swanthamenna Padathinenthartham"	K. J. Yesudas	Sreekumaran Thampi	

== Reception ==
B. N. Reddy wrote, "Mohiniyattam is a well produced, artistic and thought-provoking picture. Lakshmi's brilliant acting, the direction and the photography are the highlights." The Sunday Standard wrote, "A good film for woman's libbers and those who fight against a cruel, selfish, debauched male-oriented society. A good theme and great ideals significantly a boost to the anti-dowry movement." The Times of India wrote, "Thampi lands Indianness to the women's liberation movement by emancipating Mohini through a vicarious realization of her motherhood." The Economic Times wrote, "Lakshmi's performance is memorable, even great at times. Thampi tries to say something different from the run of the mill film." Screen wrote, "In its best moments Mohiniyattam is a fine piece of celluloid art replete with visually beautiful scenes and poetic imagery. It is also one of the most meaningful tributes paid to women by the commercial cinema and it should be valued for this if not for anything else."

== Awards ==
Filmfare Awards South - 1976

- Best Film - Malayalam - Raji & Thapsi
- Best Director - Malayalam - Sreekumaran Thampi
- Best Actress - Malayalam - Lakshmi
