= Sangamam (1977 film) =

- Directed by: Hariharan
- Written by: S. L. Puram Sadanandan
- Screenplay by: S. L. Puram Sadanandan
- Starring: Vincent; Sukumari; Jose; Bahadoor; Poojappura Ravi
- Cinematography: C. Ramachandra Menon
- Edited by: M. S. Mani
- Music by: M. S. Viswanathan
- Production company: Sahrudaya Films
- Distributed by: Sahrudaya Films
- Release date: 29 July 1977
- Country: India
- Language: Malayalam

Sangamam is a 1977 Indian Malayalam film, directed by Hariharan. The film stars Vincent, Sukumari, Jose, Bahadoor and Poojappura Ravi in the lead roles. The film has musical score by M. S. Viswanathan.

== Cast ==
- Vincent
- Roja Ramani
- Jose
- Sukumari
- Bahadoor
- Jose Prakash
- Sukumari
- Pattom Sadan
- Poojappura Ravi
- Balan K. Nair
- Vijayan
- Kailas Nath

== Soundtrack ==
The music was composed by M. S. Viswanathan and the lyrics were written by Mankombu Gopalakrishnan.

No.	Song	Singers	Lyrics	Length (m:ss)
1	"Aadikaviyude"	K. J. Yesudas, Chorus	Mankombu Gopalakrishnan	
2	"Chumbanathil"	P. Jayachandran	Mankombu Gopalakrishnan	
3	"Manmadha Gandharva"	K. J. Yesudas, Vani Jairam	Mankombu Gopalakrishnan	
4	"Sahasra Kamaladalangal"	Vani Jairam	Mankombu Gopalakrishnan	
5	"Seethadevi Sreedevi"	P. Jayachandran, Chorus	Mankombu Gopalakrishnan	
6	"Swargavaathilambalathil"	K. J. Yesudas	Mankombu Gopalakrishnan	
