= Ambalavilakku =

- Directed by: Sreekumaran Thampi
- Written by: Sreekumaran Thampi
- Screenplay by: Sreekumaran Thampi
- Produced by: S. Kumar
- Starring: Madhu; Srividya; Sukumari; Jagathy Sreekumar
- Cinematography: Anandakuttan
- Edited by: K. Narayanan
- Music by: V. Dakshinamoorthy
- Production company: Sastha Productions
- Distributed by: Sastha Productions
- Release date: 9 May 1980
- Country: India
- Language: Malayalam

Ambalavilakku is a 1980 Indian Malayalam-language film, directed by Sreekumaran Thampi and produced by S. Kumar. The film stars Madhu, Srividya, Sukumari and Jagathy Sreekumar. The film has original songs composed by V. Dakshinamoorthy.

== Cast ==
- Madhu as Gopi
- Srividya as Sumathi Teacher
- Sukumari as Srimathi Rama Varma
- Jagathy Sreekumar as Vasukkutty
- Thikkurissy Sukumaran Nair as Dr. Rama Varma
- Sreelatha Namboothiri as Rajamma
- Vaikkam Mani
- Adoor Bhavani as Gopi's Mother
- Aranmula Ponnamma as Savithri's Mother-in-law
- Aroor Sathyan
- Kailas Nath
- Kuthiravattam Pappu as Lonachan
- Lissy
- Peyad Vijayan
- Poojappura Ravi as Radhakrishnan Sir
- Roopa as Geetha
- Sasi
- Roja Ramani as Savithri
- Somasekharan Nair
- Unnikrishnan Chelembra

== Soundtrack ==
The music was composed by V. Dakshinamoorthy and the lyrics were written by Sreekumaran Thampi.

No.	Song	Singers	Lyrics	Length (m:ss)
1	"Manjappattu Njorinju"	Vani Jairam	Sreekumaran Thampi	
2	"Pakal Swapnathin Pavanurukkum"	K. J. Yesudas, Vani Jairam	Sreekumaran Thampi	
3	"Varumo Veendum Thrikkaarthikakal"	K. J. Yesudas	Sreekumaran Thampi	
