= Muttel Junction =

Human settlement in India

Muttel Junction is in Mannar village, Alappuzha district, Kerala state, India. It is one of the main junctions on the Mannar-Chengannur road.
