= Oru Thalai Ragam =

1980 film by E. M. Ibrahim

- Poster
- Directed by: E. M. Ibrahim; Rajendar (uncredited) (Note: Though E. M. Ibrahim is solely credited as the director, Rajendar shot the majority of the film.)
- Screenplay by: Team Mansoor Creations
- Story by: Rajendar
- Produced by: E. M. Ibrahim
- Starring: Shankar; Roopa
- Cinematography: Robert–Rajasekar
- Edited by: D. Raj
- Music by: Songs: Rajendar; Score: A. A. Raj
- Production company: Mansoor Creations
- Distributed by: Mansoor Creations
- Release date: 2 May 1980
- Running time: 122 minutes
- Country: India
- Language: Tamil

Oru Thalai Ragam (transl. One-Sided Love) is a 1980 Indian Tamil-language romantic musical film written by Rajendar and produced by E. M. Ibrahim who is credited for direction. The film stars Shankar and Roopa, with Raveendar, Chandrasekhar, Kailashnath, Kumari Usha and Thyagu in supporting roles. It revolves around a college student falling in love with his classmate who, despite liking him, avoids returning his love.

Oru Thalai Ragam is the career debut of Rajendar. The film was released on 2 May 1980, received critical acclaim and became a major box office success, running for over a year in theatres. It also won the Cinema Express Award for Best Tamil Film. The film was remade in Telugu as Panchadara Chilaka (1999).

== Plot ==
Raja is a college student who is popular among the other students. Subhadra, his sincere and quiet classmate, never speaks openly even with her closest friend Lavanya. Subhadra's father had deserted her mother and two daughters, suspecting that she had loved someone before marriage. As a result, people in their locality look down on Subhadra's mother, who supports her children by stitching clothes and is the subject of most gossip sessions. However, Subhadra concentrates only on studies without getting distracted by other issues as advised by her mother and maintains a safe distance from other college boys.

Subhadra's male classmates Madhu, Kannan and Thambu tease her in class by narrating the rumours about her mother and gossip about her love for Raja. When she gets upset, Raja tries to protect her from Madhu's group many times. Raja and Subhadra develop fondness and miss each other if they do not see even for a day, though they never speak to each other about the good feeling they have for each other. Raja's classmate Moorthy notices Raja's interest in Subhadra. Lavanya also notices the same affinity in Subhadra towards Raja.

One day, when Raja expresses his love to Subhadra, she becomes angry and rejects his proposal. Though she actually likes him, due to her family situation and mother's instructions to avoid men, she shows no feelings for him. Upset, Raja declares he will never speak to her about his love again; he confidently states that she will come to express her love for him one day. Their silent love continues within themselves.

Raja eventually falls ill due to liver jaundice and does not attend college. When Lavanya visits him, she learns of his deep love for Subhadra and the suffering he is going through. Lavanya meets Subhadra and shouts at her cowardice to express her love to Raja. The academic year ends. Subhadra's mother learns about Subhadra's love and insults her. Subhadra now decides to meet Raja to express her love as she no longer wishes to hide it. Though his health has worsened, Raja comes with Moorthy by train to college to recollect their college days. Subhadra sees Raja seated in the train and expresses her love, but is devastated upon learning that he is already dead.

== Cast ==
- Shankar as Raja
- Roopa as Subhadra
- Raveendar as Madhu
- Chandrasekhar as Moorthy
- Kailas Nath as Thambu
- Kumari Usha as Lavanya
- Thyagu as Kannan
- Rajendar as a Hindi-singing student (cameo appearance)

== Production ==
The film marked the debut of T. Rajendar in the film industry. It also marked the acting debuts of Shankar, Roopa, and Thyagu. Raveendar, who previously had a minor role in Aval Appadithan (1978), made his full-fledged acting debut in this film. Though Kailas Nath was not very fluent in Tamil, he dubbed in his own voice. E. M. Ibrahim of Mansoor Creations agreed to produce the film, reportedly on the basis of one condition that Ibrahim himself will be credited as director while Rajender would be credited as the screenwriter and music composer. During the shoot, since Ibrahim had no prior experience of film direction, Rajender shot the whole film. Cinematography was handled by the duo Robert–Rajasekar. The film was prominently shot at A.V.C. College in Mayiladuthurai where Rajendar was an alumnus. Filming was completed within two months.

== Music ==
The music was composed by Rajendar, who also wrote the lyrics. Since the lead characters hardly speak to each other throughout the film, Archana Nathan, writing for Scroll.in, feels the songs are their way of communicating. Rajender said he wrote the song "Idhu Kuzhandhai Paadum" with the intention of defying the rules of grammar and "mak[ing] a distinctive mark" in his debut film. The songs became successful and made Rajendar popular as a composer. Rajender recalled that though he had composed the score, he was not credited for that; the score he composed was replaced with a different score composed by A. A. Raj. This made Rajendar swear not to watch the film again.

Track listing
No.	Title	Singer(s)	Length
1.	"Vasamilla Malar Idhu"	S. P. Balasubrahmanyam	4:49
2.	"Kadavul Vazhum"	P. Jayachandran	5:00
3.	"Koodaiyile Karuvaadu"	Malaysia Vasudevan	3:25
4.	"En Kadhai Mudiyum"	T. M. Soundararajan	3:25
5.	"Idhu Kuzhandhai Paadum"	S. P. Balasubrahmanyam	4:38
6.	"Manmadhan"	Jolly Abraham	4:13
7.	"Naan Oru Raasiyilaa Raja"	T. M. Soundararajan	4:24
Total length:			29:54

== Release and reception ==
Oru Thalai Ragam was released on 2 May 1980. Ibrahim had to release the film himself after distributors refused due to the high price Ibrahim quoted for distribution territories. Ananda Vikatan rated the film 50 out of 100, appreciating Robert–Rajasekar's cinematography, the songs by Rajendar and score by Raj. Kanthan of Kalki praised the performances of the cast and Robert–Rajasekar's cinematography and concluded calling the film a touchstone for the fandom of moviegoers. The film completed 365 days of run in several theatres. Initial days after the release saw low responses at the box office, but the film eventually picked up and became a success.

== Legacy ==
Oru Thalai Ragam's success led to more films in Tamil based on the theme of one-sided and unexpressed love. Shankar, for a while, became popularly known as "Oru Thalai Ragam Shankar" after the film's release. The film was remade in Telugu as Panchadara Chilaka (1999). Film historian S. Theodore Baskaran felt that Oru Thalai Ragam and Nammavar (1994) were the "two most representative Tamil films about students".

== Bibliography ==
- Dhananjayan, G. (2011). The Best of Tamil Cinema, 1931 to 2010: 1977–2010. Galatta Media. OCLC 733724281.
- Jacob, Preminda (2008). Celluloid Deities: The Visual Culture of Cinema and Politics in South India. Lexington Books. ISBN 978-0-7391-3130-5.
- Rajadhyaksha, Ashish; Willemen, Paul (1998) [1994]. Encyclopaedia of Indian Cinema. British Film Institute and Oxford University Press. ISBN 0-19-563579-5.
