= Chandrakantham =

- Directed by: Sreekumaran Thampi
- Written by: Sreekumaran Thampi
- Screenplay by: Sreekumaran Thampi
- Produced by: Rajashilpi
- Starring: Prem Nazir; Jayabharathi; Adoor Bhasi; Balakrishnan
- Cinematography: Vipin Das
- Edited by: M. S. Mani
- Music by: M. S. Viswanathan
- Production company: Rajashilpi
- Distributed by: Rajashilpi
- Release date: 28 February 1974
- Country: India
- Language: Malayalam

Chandrakantham is a 1974 Indian Malayalam film, directed by Sreekumaran Thampi and produced by Rajashilpi. The film stars Prem Nazir, Jayabharathi, Adoor Bhasi and Balakrishnan in the lead roles. The film has musical score by M. S. Viswanathan.

== Plot synopsis ==
Vinayan, a writer, takes care of his twin brother Ajayan, whose behavior is different from his. Vinayan is shocked when he finds that his brother loves the same girl that he was planning to marry.

== Cast ==
- Prem Nazir as Vinayan, Ajayan (double role)
- Jayabharathi as Rajani
- Adoor Bhasi as Dr. Jacob
- Balakrishnan
- Kedamangalam Sadanandan
- Sankaradi as Sreesankara Pilla
- T. R. Omana as School Teacher
- P. K. Joseph
- T. S. Muthaiah as Menon
- Kedamangalam Ali
- Baby Sumathi as Young Vinayan, Bindu (double role)
- Bahadoor as Raghavan
- Master Rajakumaran Thampi as Young Ajayan
- Satheesh
- Sumithra as Dhobi's sister
- Kunchan as Krishnankutty

== Soundtrack ==
All lyrics are written by Sreekumaran Thampi; all music is composed by M. S. Viswanathan.

No.	Title	Artist(s)	Length
1.	"Aa Nimishathinte"	S. Janaki
2.	"Aa Nimishathinte"	K. J. Yesudas
3.	"Chirikkumpol Neeyoru"	K. P. Brahmanandan
4.	"Engirunnaalum Ninte"	K. J. Yesudas
5.	"Hridayaavahini Ozhukunnu Nee"	M. S. Viswanathan
6.	"Mazhameghamoru Dinam"	K. J. Yesudas
7.	"Nin Prema Vaanathin"	K. J. Yesudas
8.	"Paanchaala Raaja Thanaye" (Traditional)	Bahadoor
9.	"Prabhaathamallo Nee"	M. S. Viswanathan
10.	"Punaraan Paanjetheedum"	K. J. Yesudas
11.	"Pushpaabharanam"	K. J. Yesudas
12.	"Raajeevanayane"	P. Jayachandran
13.	"Suvarnamekha Suhaasini"	K. J. Yesudas
14.	"Swargamenna Kaananathil"	K. J. Yesudas

== view the film ==
Chandrakantham on YouTube
