= Jeevitham Oru Gaanam =

- Directed by: Sreekumaran Thampi
- Written by: Sreekumaran Thampi
- Screenplay by: Sreekumaran Thampi
- Starring: Madhu; Srividya; M. G. Soman; Shobhana (Roja Ramani)
- Cinematography: V. Karunakaran
- Edited by: K. Narayanan
- Music by: M. S. Viswanathan
- Production company: Victory Arts Films
- Distributed by: Victory Arts Films
- Release date: 2 November 1979
- Country: India
- Language: Malayalam

Jeevitham Oru Gaanam (transl. 'Life is a song') is a 1979 Indian Malayalam-language film directed by Sreekumaran Thampi. The film stars Madhu, Srividya, M. G. Soman and Roja Ramani in the lead roles. The film has musical score by M. S. Viswanathan.

== Cast ==
- Madhu
- Srividya
- M. G. Soman
- Shobhana (Roja Ramani)
- Sukumari
- Vaikkam Mani
- Unnimary
- Adoor Bhavani
- Bhagyalakshmi
- Kuthiravattam Pappu
- Master Rajakumaran Thampi
- Poojappura Ravi
- Raji

== Soundtrack ==
The music was composed by M. S. Viswanathan and the lyrics were written by Sreekumaran Thampi.

No.	Song	Singers	Lyrics	Length (m:ss)
1	"Jeevitham Oru Ganam"	K. J. Yesudas	Sreekumaran Thampi	
2	"Maracheeni Vilayunna"	K. J. Yesudas	Sreekumaran Thampi	
3	"Marakkaanavilla Naalu"	K. J. Yesudas, Vani Jairam	Sreekumaran Thampi	
4	"Sathyanayaka Mukthidayaka"	K. J. Yesudas, Chorus	Sreekumaran Thampi	
5	"Septemberil Pootha"	Vani Jairam	Sreekumaran Thampi	
6	"Vasanthamenna Pournami Penninu"	K. J. Yesudas	Sreekumaran Thampi	
