= Panchadara Chilaka =

- DVD cover
- Directed by: Kodi Ramakrishna
- Screenplay by: Mullapudi Venkata Ramana
- Based on: Oru Thalai Ragam by T. Rajendar
- Starring: Srikanth; Kausalya
- Music by: S. A. Rajkumar
- Production company: Divya Art Pictures
- Release date: 29 October 1999
- Country: India
- Language: Telugu

Panchadara Chilaka (transl. Sugar parrot) is a 1999 Indian Telugu-language romantic drama film directed by Kodi Ramakrishna, starring Srikanth and Kausalya. It is a remake of the 1980 Tamil film Oru Thalai Ragam.

== Plot ==
Kalyani, a college student, is deeply in love with her classmate Murali but struggles to express her feelings. Murali, unaware of her affection, mistakenly believes that Kalyani doesn't likes him. Kalyani’s personal life is fraught with challenges, as her elder sister is entangled with a dangerous goon who now threatens Kalyani and her younger sister. This perilous situation prevents Kalyani from reaching out to Murali and confiding in him about her troubles, further complicating their relationship.

== Cast ==
- Srikanth as Murali
- Kausalya as Kalyani
- Prithvi as Suri
- M. S. Narayana as college principal
- Ali as Ali
- Jayalalitha
- Raksha as Ali's wife
- Naveen Choudhary as Jagan
- Surya
- Uttej
- Tirupathi Prakash
- Madhuri Sen

== Production ==
The film was shot at Araku Valley and Ramoji Film City in March 1999. Some songs and scenes were also shot at Mahabalipuram.

== Soundtrack ==
The music was composed by S. A. Rajkumar with lyrics by Sirivennela Seetharama Sastry. The song "Anukunnana" is based on Rajkumar's own tune "Azhaga Azhaga" from Ponmanam (1998).

Tracklist
No.	Title	Singer(s)	Length
1.	"Anukunnana Enadyna"	S. P. Balasubrahmanyam	4:16
2.	"Mounamenduke Koila"	S. P. Balasubrahmanyam	3:59
3.	"Neeru Leni Nadilo"	Rajesh	4:42
4.	"Chanda O Chanda"	S. P. Balasubrahmanyam	4:24
5.	"Haire Haire"	Rajesh	4:33
6.	"Undi Undi Urimindi"	S. P. Balasubrahmanyam	4:29
Total length:			26:23

== Reception ==
Griddaluru Gopalrao of Zamin Ryot gave the film a negative review, criticising the plot and characterisations as illogical and insipid. He also criticised the direction of Kodi Ramakrishna, but noted that the music and lyrics were good. A critic from Andhra Today rated the film one out of five stars and wrote that "In a nutshell, the movie can be termed as one produced by the producer-director duo, who chose the theme during a period of mental imbalance. With its meaningless characters it tests the patience of the audience. To add to all this it is replete with double meaning dialogues. The only relief comes in the form of music score by S. A. Rajkumar".
