= Onde Raktha =

- Directed by: Sreekumaran Thampi
- Written by: Chi. Udayashankar (dialogues)
- Screenplay by: Sreekumaran Thampi
- Story by: Sreekumaran Thampi
- Produced by: Sreekumaran Thampi
- Starring: Ambareesh; Ambika
- Cinematography: V. Karunakar
- Edited by: L. Bhoominathan
- Music by: Rajan–Nagendra
- Release date: 1 June 1984
- Country: India
- Language: Kannada

Onde Raktha (transl. Same blood) is a 1984 Indian Kannada-language film written, directed and produced by Sreekumaran Thampi. The film stars Ambareesh and Ambika. The film has musical score by Rajan Nagendra. The film was dubbed in Malayalam as Ore Raktham.

== Cast ==
- Ambareesh
- Ambika
- Sundar Krishna Urs
- Mukhyamantri Chandru
- Pandari Bai
- Anuradha
- Shakti Prasad
- Sudheer
- Sundar Raj
- Doddanna
- Ashok

== Production ==
Following the box office failure of Ambareesh's Malayalam film Gaanam (1982), directed and produced by Sreekumaran Thampi, Ambareesh offered him a Kannada film, which eventually became Onde Raktham.

== Soundtrack ==
The music was composed by Rajan Nagendra with lyrics by Chi. Udayashankar.

Kannada

No.	Song	Singers
1	"Hoovali Jenina"	S. P. Balasubrahmanyam, S. Janaki
2	"Thangaali"	Jolly Abraham
3	"Ravi Kaanadella"	S. P. Balasubrahmanyam
4	"Ee Aanandavu"	S. P. Balasubrahmanyam, S. Janaki

Malayalam dubbed version

Lyrics by Sreekumaran Thampi.

No.	Song	Singers
1	"Ee Aanandam"	Krishnachandran, Lathika
2	"Poovilalinja"	Jolly Abraham, Lathika
3	"Ravi Kandathellaam"	Krishnachandran
4	"Thenkaattu Veeshi"	Jolly Abraham

== Box office ==
Similar to Thampi and Ambareesh's previous outing Gaanam (1982), this film was a box office failure.
