= Munnettam =

- Poster
- Directed by: Sreekumaran Thampi
- Written by: Sreekumaran Thampi
- Screenplay by: Sreekumaran Thampi
- Produced by: S. Kumar
- Starring: Mammootty; Sumalatha; Ratheesh; Menaka; Jalaja
- Cinematography: Dhananjayan
- Edited by: K. Narayanan
- Music by: Shyam
- Production company: Sastha Productions
- Distributed by: Sastha Productions
- Release date: 7 August 1981
- Country: India
- Language: Malayalam

Munnettam is a 1981 Indian Malayalam-language film, directed by Sreekumaran Thampi and produced by S. Kumar. The film stars Mammootty, Sumalatha, Ratheesh, Menaka and Jalaja . The film has musical score by Shyam. This is a remake of the successful Tamil movie Bhuvana Oru Kelvi Kuri

== Cast ==
- Mammootty as Rajappan
- Ratheesh as Chandran
- Menaka as Indhu
- Jalaja as Janu
- Sumalatha
- Adoor Bhasi
- Prathapachandran
- Baby Ponnambili
- Jagathy sreekumar as Gopy

== Soundtrack ==
The music was composed by Shyam and the lyrics were written by Sreekumaran Thampi. Unni Menon became popular for singing songs in this film.

Song	Singers	Length (m:ss)
"Chirikondu Pothiyum"	S. P. Balasubrahmanyam	3:53
"Valakilukkam Oru Valakilukkam"	Vani Jairam, Unni Menon	3:58
