= Gaanam =

- Poster
- Directed by: Sreekumaran Thampi
- Written by: Sreekumaran Thampi
- Produced by: Sreekumaran Thampi
- Starring: Ambareesh; Lakshmi
- Cinematography: C. Ramachandra Menon
- Edited by: K. Narayanan
- Music by: V. Dakshinamoorthy
- Production company: Ragamalika
- Distributed by: Ragamalika
- Release date: 8 April 1982
- Country: India
- Language: Malayalam

Gaanam (transl. Song) is a 1982 Indian Malayalam-language drama film written, directed and produced by Sreekumaran Thampi. The film stars Ambareesh and Lakshmi, with Jagathy Sreekumar, Adoor Bhasi, Nedumudi Venu and Hari in supporting roles. The film features original songs composed by V. Dakshinamoorthy.

The film won the Kerala State Film Award for Best Film with Popular Appeal and Aesthetic Value.

== Plot ==
Palghat Rukmini and Aravindakshan Bhagavathar are two gifted musicians, who are drawn to each other and they see only music as the common interest, which made them fall in love with each other. They never realized the fact that they belong two different castes, Rukmini from an orthodox Namboodhri Tharavadu and Aravindakshan from a low-caste Puliya household. But the same music was the cause of their separation too, because of their ego clash.

The movie takes us to a beautiful village in Kerala with a river and temple. We hear a melodious Thiagaraja's composition Sri Mahaganabathm Bajare. A member of a local Puliya community listens to the song with so much adulation and follows curiously where it is coming from and it took him to a palatial Namboodhri Tharavaadu. The boy is Aravindakshan and the singer is Narayana Namboodhiri Padu. As he is not allowed to enter the house, he is stopped at the gate. He soon was sent back. Fortunately Narayanan saw him again, this time he saw him deeply engrossed in the sound of nature. He decided to take him as his disciple as he found a musical genius in him.

He welcomed him to his house, gave him a nice dress and food and took him to a Kathakali performance. All the guests walked away saying he brought curse to the Namboodhiri family by bringing a lower-caste boy. Narayanan completely ignored their criticism and decided to teach him, saying music knows no caste. Aravindakshan began to learn from him. Narayanan was completely impressed by his talent and his daughter Sreedevi started admiring him secretly. She too learned Mohiniyattam and the house was filled with music.

After many years of dedicated learning, Aravindakshan became a great singer, even surpassed his Guru. But unlike Narayanan he started performing in famous auditoriums and temples and became a well known figure. Ganapathi Iyer and Vasukkutty became his constant accompanies. Ganapathi often mentions one Palghat Rukmini and Aravindakshan was curious to know about her. In fact he was a bit jealous of her even without seeing her. Ganapathi was supposed to play for her in Chithoor concert and people were so enthralled by her music. Even Rukmini heard people talking about Aravindakshan and she wants to meet him desperately.

Narayanan Namboothiri was all in praise of Aravindakshan. He has given up all his properties and living in a small house with Sree Devi. Aravindakshan felt guilty and asked him whether he is responsible for his present state for which Namboodhiri answered it was his own decision. He quoted Saint Thiagaraja "Nidhi saala Sugama, Rama Nee Paaduka seva Sugama".

Rukmini finally had a chance to see him. She heard through Ganabathi that he is an expert in singing Ragamalika. Rukmini wanted to learn it, too. When he approached Narayanan ge refused immediately, saying Aravindakshan is the right choice and Rukmini decided to meet him. But her father is dead against the idea, as he felt it is below their prestige to learn from a lower-caste person. He even insulted Namboothiri saying he is only fit for teaching low caste students. Rukmini apologized on her father's behalf and left with a heavy heart.

She went to the temple where Aravindakshan is going to sing. She introduced herself to him and told her life's ambition to learn Ragamalika from him. Aravindakshan was so spellbound on seeing her and agreed immediately. They both were so involved in their passion and spent all their time singing and learning from each other. In that process, a mutual attraction develops. They both decided to get married. They even talk about having a baby who will neither be a Namboothiri nor a Nair or Pulaya but a child of music.

Narayanan was so happy when he heard the news and gave his blessings, but Sreedevi was broken hearted. Narayanan consoled her asking her to swallow it like a bitter pill. He told her that Thirumeni family are only givers and not takers.

There was a storm in their smooth relationship all of a sudden. Rukmini's friend was commenting casually one day that Aravindakshan is a little proud about his musical talent and Rukmini too felt the same. When Sami iyer was criticizing Aravindakshan mixing two ragas in a concert, he got so furious saying such a thing can never happen and only Goddess Saraswathi can find fault with him and no one else. He asked to Rukmini's opinion about this for which she sang a composition of Saint Thiagaraja which states that even an emperor cannot feel superior to anyone. All started making fun of him including Ramaiar. Aravindakshan got so insulted and immediately walked away saying it is because he belongs to a lower caste they all joined and make fun of him. Rukmini was completely shattered.

Narayanan Namboothiri died suddenly of heart attack. Aravindakshan carried his body to the grave. Other Namboothiris cursed Narayanan for bringing insult to their community. Sreedevi was left alone. Aravindakshan was ready to marry her saying he never did anything in return for his Guru and this is the only out of gratitude he is doing. He told her that he has forgotten his relationship with Rukmini as a bad dream.

Ganabathi Iyer stopped accompanying Aravindakshan. Rukmini found out that his father is having an affair with another woman. She accused him saying even her mother had the same status and she was an accident. He was using her musical talent only to make money and left him leaving all her savings with him and never to look at her again. When she wanted to return to Aravindakshan she was shocked to see him with Sreedevi as husband and wife. She decided to leave her home. Ganapathi decided to be with her as a loyal servant.

After few months they both had a chance to meet. This time in Guruvayur. Aravindakshan was supposed to be honored for getting Padmashree by a musical Saba. Only after arriving he realise it was after Rukmini's concert. He immediately walked away from the venue. Though Rukmini performed in the function, after that she completely broke down.

Years passed by. Aravindakshan and Sreedevi have a son Anand who is musically very talented like his parents but his interest is in western music. He becomes a gifted guitar player. But his father opposes him playing a western instrument, calling him a rebel and not appreciating his talents. Once he was so angered that he broke his guitar. Anand left the house in a huff.

Ganapathi found him lying under the tree one day, and immediately recognized him as Aravindakshan's son. He took him to Rukmini. Without revealing his background he asked her to teach him, saying he is very interested in learning music. Rukmini was astonished by his music talent but soon found out he must be Aravindakshan's son. By the same time, Aravindakshan lost his voice and could not sing like before. He was frustrated and visiting all temples. Rukmini and Aravindakshan met once again in Mookambika temple. Rukmini told him he has not lost his voice but she has it with her. She took him to Anand. Father and son had a happy reunion. When they were searching for Rukmini, they found her leaving the house once again but this time alone, and surrendered herself to the feet of Devi Mokambika where she feels no one can come in between her and her music.

== Cast ==
- Ambareesh as Aravindakshan Bhagavathar
- Lakshmi as Palghat Rukmini
- Poornima Jayaram as Sreedevi
- Shanavas
- Jagathy Sreekumar
- Adoor Bhasi
- Nedumudi Venu as Ganapathi Iyer
- Hari
- Vaikkam Mani
- Kalaranjini
- Babu Namboothiri
- Baby Ponnambili
- Bhagyalakshmi
- Kailas Nath
- Kuttyedathi Vilasini
- Master Rajakumaran Thampi
- P. K. Venukkuttan Nair

== Production ==
M. G. Soman was initially supposed to play one of the lead roles, but after Thampi encountered issues with him on the sets of another film after the success of Itha Ivide Vare (1977), he decided not to cast him. Sheela was cast as the other lead but due to her marriage, she was replaced by Lakshmi. After liking his performance in the film Ranganayaki (1981), Thampi cast Ambareesh.

== Soundtrack ==
The music was composed by V. Dakshinamoorthy and the lyrics were written by Sreekumaran Thampi, Swathi Thirunal, Thyagaraja, Irayimman Thampi, Unnai Warrier, Muthuswamy Dikshithar and Jayadevar.

No.	Song	Singers	Lyrics	Length (m:ss)
1	"Aalaapanam"	K. J. Yesudas, S. Janaki	Sreekumaran Thampi	4:23
2	"Aalaapanam" (M)	K. J. Yesudas	Sreekumaran Thampi	
3	"Aarodu Cholvene"	K. J. Yesudas, Vani Jairam	Sreekumaran Thampi	
4	"Adri Suthaavara"	K. J. Yesudas, P. Susheela, M. Balamuralikrishna	Swathi Thirunal	
5	"Aliveni Enthu Cheyvu"	P. Susheela	Swathi Thirunal	
6	"Guruleka" (Entharo Mahanubhavulu)	M. Balamuralikrishna	Thyagaraja	
7	"Karuna Cheyvaanenthu Thaamasam"	Vani Jairam	Irayimman Thampi	
8	"Maanasa"	S. Janaki		
9	"Sarvardhu Ramaneeya"	Kalamandalam Sukumaran, Kalanilayam Unnikrishnan	Unnai Warrier	
10	"Sindooraaruna Vigrahaam"	S. Janaki		
11	"Sree Mahaaganapathim"	M. Balamuralikrishna	Muthuswamy Dikshithar	
12	"Yaa Ramitha"	M. Balamuralikrishna	Jayadevar	

== Box office ==
The film was a commercial failure, and Ambareesh offered him to direct him in a Kannada film titled Onde Raktha (1985). Despite the film's failure, Thampi considers this film his best work.
