= Pattambalam =

Hindu temple in Alappuzha district, Kerala

Kurattikadu Pattambalam Devi Temple
- Kurattikadu Pattambalam Devi Temple, Mannar, Alappuzha, Kerala

Religion
- Affiliation: Hinduism
- District: Alappuzha
- Deity: Bhadrakali
- Festival: Anpoli Areeppara

Location
- Location: Mannar
- State: Kerala
- Country: India
- Interactive map of Kurattikadu Pattambalam Devi Temple
- Coordinates: 9°18′49.2″N 76°32′26.0″E

Architecture
- Type: Architecture of Kerala

Specifications
- Temple: One
- Elevation: 31.1 m (102 ft)

Kurattikadu Pattambalam Devi Kshethram or Kurattikadu Pattambalam Devi Temple is a Devi Temple in Mannar, Kerala, India. The main ritual of the temple is the Anpoli Vazhipadu during Anpoli Areeppara, the most important event at the temple, an annual 18-day festival from Medam 10th to 27th. The main deity worshipped is the goddess Bhadrakali, along with Bhadra, Ganapati, and Goshala Krishna. At this temple Bhadrakali is also known as Valiya Amma ("Great Mother").

The temple manages the nearby Sree Bhuvaneswari Higher Secondary School.

== See also ==
- Temples of Kerala
