= Irattimadhuram =

- Directed by: Sreekumaran Thampi
- Written by: Sreekumaran Thampi
- Screenplay by: Sreekumaran Thampi
- Starring: Prem Nazir; Krishnachandran; K. R. Vijaya; Master Rajakumaran Thampi
- Cinematography: C. Ramachandra Menon
- Edited by: K. Narayanan
- Music by: Shyam
- Production company: Hemnag Films
- Distributed by: Hemnag Films
- Release date: 31 December 1982
- Country: India
- Language: Malayalam

Irattimadhuram is a 1982 Indian Malayalam film, directed by Sreekumaran Thampi. The film stars Prem Nazir, Krishnachandran, K. R. Vijaya and Master Rajakumaran Thampi in the lead roles. The film has musical score by Shyam.

== Cast ==
- Prem Nazir as Achuthan Nair
- Krishnachandran as Ramu
- K. R. Vijaya as Madhavikutty
- Master Rajakumaran Thampi as Ravikuttan
- Master Khaja Sharif
- Shanavas as Surendran
- Shivaji as Balan
- Sumalatha as Sangeetha
- Sukumari as Kalyaniyamma
- Adoor Bhasi as Thorappan Panikkar
- Jagathy Sreekumar as Unnikrishnan
- Balan K. Nair as K. B. Menon
- P. K. Abraham as Vakkel Mahadevan
- Vijayalakshmi as Mrs Panikkar
- Guddi Maruti as Omana

== Soundtrack ==
The music was composed by Shyam and the lyrics were written by Sreekumaran Thampi.

No.	Song	Singers	Lyrics	Length (m:ss)
1	"Amme Amme Amme Ennaanente Kalyanam"	K. J. Yesudas	Sreekumaran Thampi	
2	"Ithiri Paattunden Nenchil"	K. J. Yesudas, Sujatha Mohan	Sreekumaran Thampi	
3	"Madhuram Madhuram Irattimadhuram"	P. Jayachandran, Vani Jairam, Chorus	Sreekumaran Thampi	
4	"Onnalla Randalla Moonnalla Nangal"	Unni Menon, Chorus, Jolly Abraham	Sreekumaran Thampi	
5	"Oru Kudukka Ponnutharaam"	P. Susheela, Vani Jairam	Sreekumaran Thampi	
6	"Vandi Vandi Vandi Ithu Valiya"	P. Jayachandran, Sujatha Mohan, Vani Jairam, Jolly Abraham	Sreekumaran Thampi	
