= Sreekumaran Thampi =

Indian film director

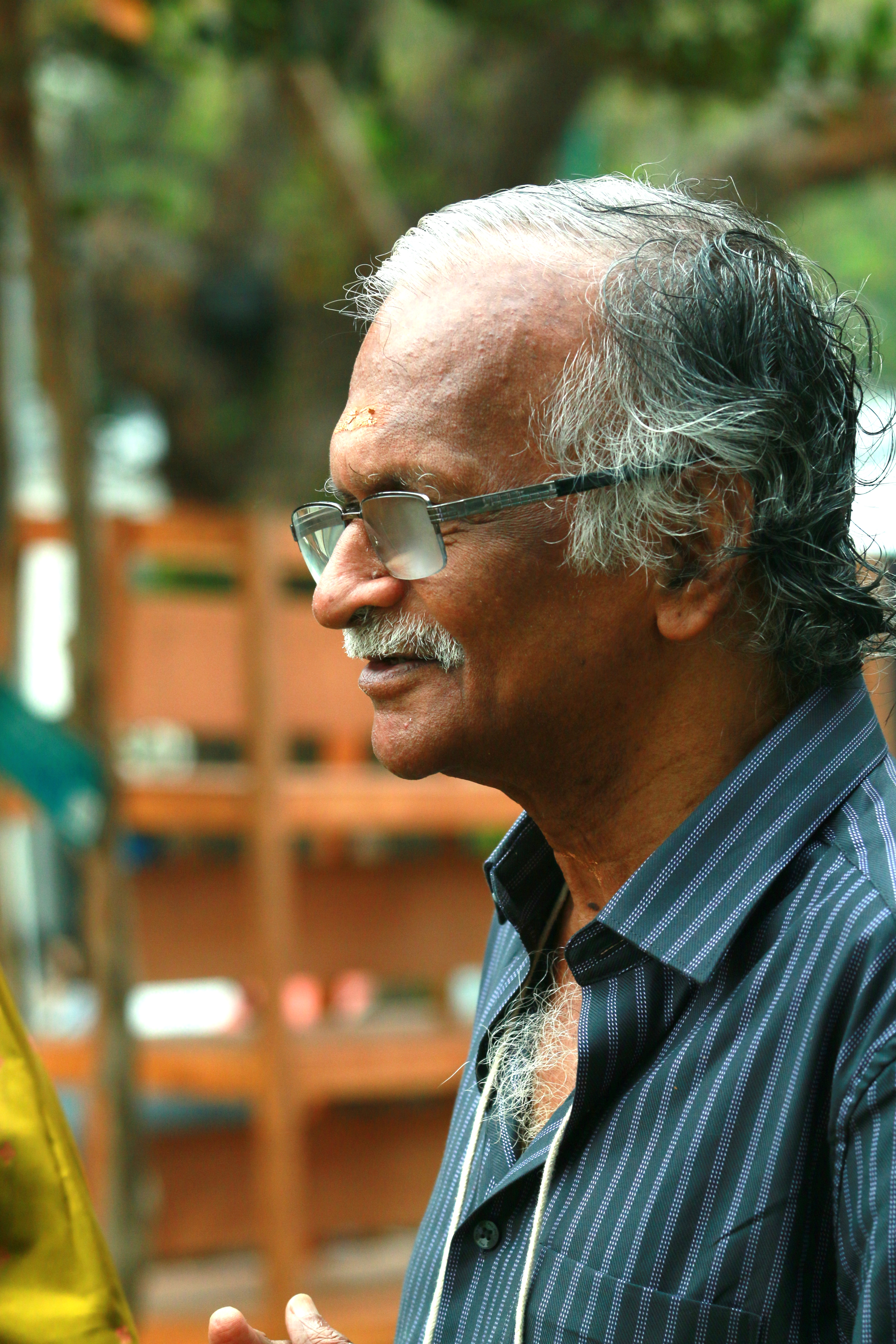
- Thampi in MBIFL 2023
- Born: 16 March 1940 (age 86); Haripad, Travancore
- Occupations: Poet; Lyricist; Film director; Film producer; Screenplay writer; Novelist; Music director
- Years active: 1966–present
- Children: 2

Sreekumaran Thampi (born 16 March 1940) is an Indian lyricist, music director, director, producer and screenwriter in Malayalam cinema. He also writes poetry and is a recipient of the Vallathol Award. In 2017, he was awarded the J. C. Daniel Award, Kerala government's highest honour for contributions to Malayalam cinema.

== Film career ==
Thampi was introduced to the Malayalam film industry in 1966 by P. Subramaniam as a lyricist in the film Kaattumallika. He has produced 25 films, directed 29, and written scripts for 85 films in Malayalam besides writing the lyrics for thousands of songs. He is also the author of the well-known literary work Prem Nazir Enna Prema Gaanam. He won the National Award for Best Book on Cinema film (Kanakkum Kavitayum) whilst his films Gaanam and Mohiniyattam won Kerala State Awards.

He is a songwriter, screenplay writer, film producer, director and musician, but says he is more of a lyricist than a filmmaker. His songs include "Chandrikayilaliyunna Chandrakaantham", "Hridayasarasile pranayapushpame" and "Swanthamenna padathinendhartham". His films Chandrakantham, Gaanam, Mohiniyattam, Maalika Paniyunnavar, Jeevitham Oru Gaanam and Ambalavilakku became artistic successes. His successful box office films include Naayattu, Aakramanam and Idi Muzhakkam.

Thampi has written four novels - Kakkathampuraatti, Kuttanad, Kadalum Karalum and Njanoru Kadha Parayam and collections of poems Engineerayuday Veena, Neelathaamara, En Makan Karayumpol, Sheershakamillatha Kavithakal, Achante Chumbanam, Ammakkoru Tharaattu, Puthralaabham and Avaseshippukal. His collection of 1001 selected songs, titled Hridaya Sarassu, had three editions in two years. Now going to its sixth edition. His selected poems have been published in Hindi with the title "Sreekumaran Thampi Ki Kavithayem". Thampi's autobiography is titled "Jeevitham Oru Pendulum" (ജീവിതം ഒരു പെൻഡുലം). The book has been recognized with the 47th Vayalar Ramavarma Memorial Award for literature. Thampi's book 'Karuppum Veluppum Mayavarnnangalum' (കറുപ്പും വെളുപ്പും മായാവർണ്ണങ്ങളും) details his life and experiences in the film industry.

== Personal life ==
Sreekumaran Thampi was born in Haripad in Alleppey district on 16 March 1940 to Kalarikkal Krishna Pillai and Karimpalayathu Bhavaniamma Thangachi (related to Haripattu Koikkal, the Royal House). He is a graduate in mathematics from Sanatana Dharma College, Alappuzha and civil engineer, graduated from Institute of Engineering Technology, Chennai and Govt. Engineering College, Thrissur.

His siblings are the late novelist P. Vasudevan Thampi who wrote Sreekrishnaparunthu (which became a hit Malayalam film), late Advocate P. Gopalakrishnan Thampi, the former director general of prosecutions (Kerala), and former chairman of Kerala Bar Council, Thulasibhai Thankachi and Prasannavadanan Thampi, former vice president of Oracle Financial Systems Software Ltd.

Thampi is married to Rajeswari, the daughter of Vaikom M. P.Mani, a popular drama actor and singer of the 1930s and 1940s, and they have a daughter (Kavitha). His wife and daughter have also dabbled in the arts. He also had a son, Rajkumaran Thampi (also known as Raj Aditya), who was an erstwhile associate of Priyadarshan and later directed some Telugu movies, until his sudden death in Secundarabad in March 2009.

== Awards ==
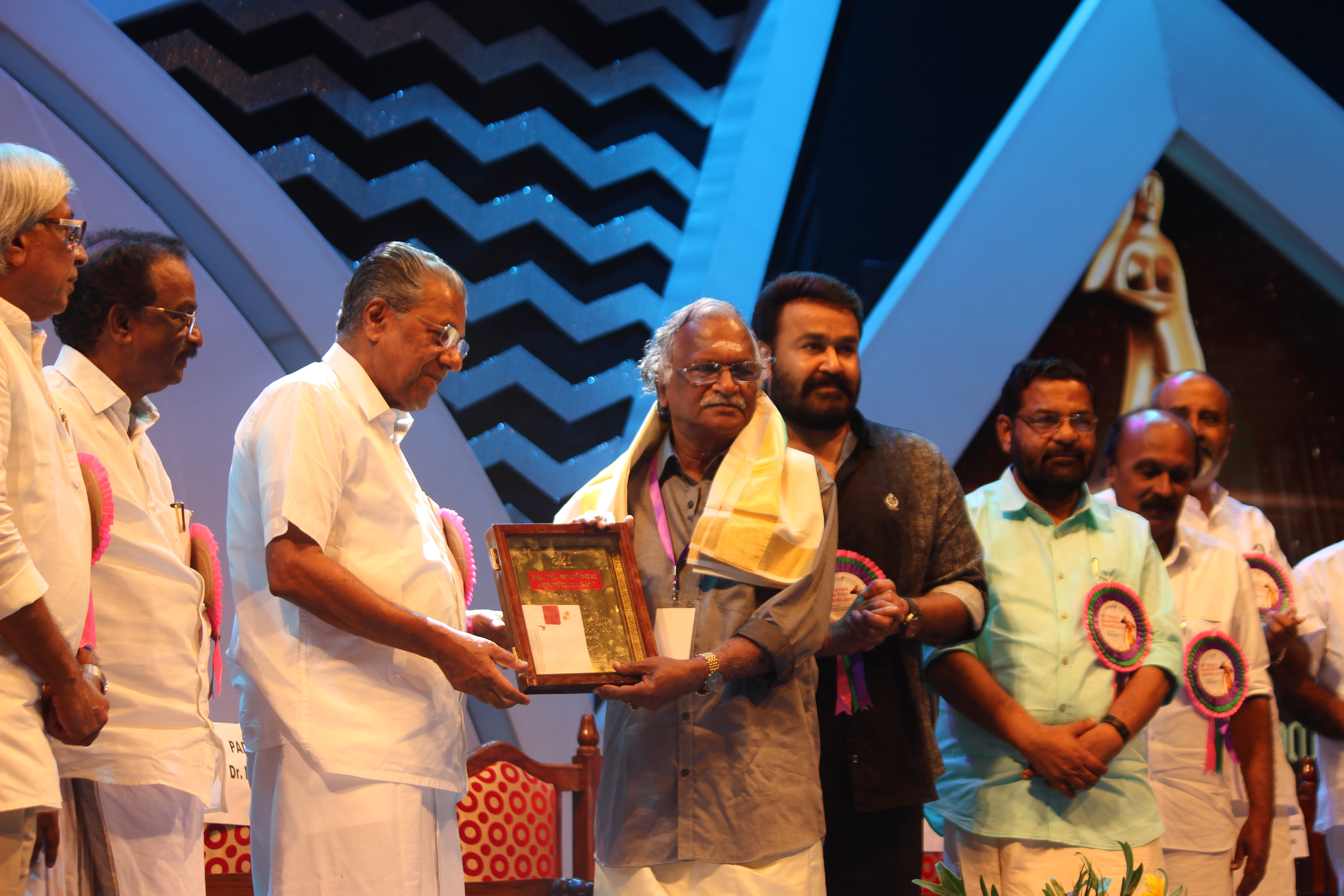
Thampi receiving the J. C. Daniel Award in 2018

National Film Awards

- 1989 - Best Book on Cinema – Cinema, Kannakkum Kavithayum

Kerala State Film Awards

- 1971 - Best Lyricist – Vilakku Vangiya Veena & Lankadahanam
- 1976 - Best Film with Popular Appeal and Aesthetic Value – Mohiniyattam
- 1981 - Best Film with Popular Appeal and Aesthetic Value – Gaanam
- 2011 - Best Lyricist – Naayika
- 2017 - J. C. Daniel Award, Kerala's highest award for contributions to Malayalam Cinema.

Kerala Sangeetha Nataka Akademi Award

- 2015 - Sreekumaran Thampi was honored with the Kalashree award, the highest civilian award given by the Kerala Sangeetha Nataka Akademi, for his lifetime contribution to light music and drama songs.
- 2022 - Best Lyricist Award (KPAC’s play ‘Aparajithar’)

Filmfare Award South

- 1976 - Best Director - Malayalam – Mohiniyattam

Other Film Awards

- 1974 - Kerala Film Goers Award (Film - Chandrakantham)
- 1976 - Kerala Film Fans Award (Film - Mohiniyattam)
- 1976 - Madras Film Fans Award (Film - Mohiniyattam)
- 1976 - Cinema Masika Trophy (Film - Mohiniyattam)
- 1981 - Madras Film Fans Special Award (Film - Gaanam)
- 1996 - Government of Kerala Veteran Cine Artists Award

Other Lifetime Achievement Awards

- 2002 - Prem Nazir Foundation Award - Lifetime Achievement Award
- 2006 - Dubai Priyadarshini's Lifetime Achievement Award
- 2007 - Ragalaya (Mumbai) Lifetime Achievement in Film Music
- 2009 - PC Sukumaran Nair Smaraka Samithi Puraskaram
- 2009 - Swathi Lifetime Achievement Award
- 2010 - Sangam Kala Group, New Delhi Chapter Lifetime Achievement Award
- 2011 - G. Devarajan Master Puraskaaram (Devadaru)
- 2012 - U.A.E Devarajan Foundation Lifetime Achievement Award
- 2012 - Muthukulam Raghavan Pillai Memorial Award for Lifetime Achievement in Cinema
- 2012 - A. P. Udhayabhanu Memorial Award (VARADA Award) for Lifetime Achievement in Cinema, Television and Literature
- 2012 - Surya TV (SUN NETWORK) Living Legend Award in Indian Cinema
- 2012 - Parvathi Padmam Award for Lifetime Achievement in Cinema and Literature
- 2013 - Amrita TV Film Award for Lifetime Achievement in Cinema
- 2014 - Radio Mirchi (Times Of India) Award for Lifetime Achievement in Film Music
- 2014 - ACV (Asianet Cable Vision) Award for Lifetime Achievement in Cinema
- 2014 - Vayalar Rama Varma Sangeetha Puraskaram instituted by Vayalar Samskaarika Vedi - Lifetime Achievement Award
- 2014 - Thilakan Foundation Award for Lifetime Achievement in Cinema
- 2014 - Parabrahma Chaithanya Award for Lifetime Achievement In Cinema and Literature
- 2015 - V. Dakshinamoorthy Sangeetha Sumeru Award instituted by Voice Foundation, Vaikkom
- 2015 - Kuwait KALA (Kerala Arts Lovers Association) V Sambasivan Award
- 2015 - Samoothiri Raja's Mekkottu Devi Award
- 2015 - Mannam Prathibha Puraskaaram - Lifetime Achievement Award
- 2015 - Souparnika Lifetime Achievement Award
- 2015 - Mayooram Lifetime Achievement Award
- 2015 - Visharad Dakshinamoorthy Puraskaaram - Lifetime Achievement Award
- 2015 - Sarath Chandra Marate Award for Lifetime Achievement in Film Music
- 2015 - FOMA Award ( Forum of Media People of Mumbai ) Award for Lifetime Achievement in Cinema and Literature.
- 2016 - Bharathan Trust's Bharathamudra Award - Lifetime Achievement Award
- 2016 - Samoothiri Raja's Kodikkunnu Devi Award for Lifetime Achievement
- 2016 - Devarajan Skakthigadha Award - Lifetime Achievement Award
- 2016 - Swaralaya Kairali Yesudas Award - Lifetime Achievement Award
- 2016 - Thiruvallam Parashurama Swami Temple Award
- 2017 - Sangeetha Saparya Award instituted by Sangeethika, Thiruvananthapuram - Lifetime Achievement Award
- 2017 - Payyannur Thapasya School of Music Award
- 2017 - Bheeshmacharya Puraskaaram instituted by J.C.I. Kodungalloor
- 2017 - G. Devarajan Master Navathi Award - Lifetime Achievement in Film Music
- 2017 - Rakendu Sangeetha Puraskaram - Lifetime Achievement Award
- 2017 - Act Award
- 2018 - Swathi Thirunal Sangeethavedi Gurusreshta Puraskaaram - Lifetime Achievement Award
- 2018 - Janmabhumi Award - Legends of India - Lifetime Achievement Award
- 2018 - Sathyan National Award instituted by Sathyan Foundation - Lifetime Achievement Award
- 2019 - Asianet Film Awards - Lifetime Achievement Award
- 2019 - Thiruvairurappan Puraskaram
- 2020 - Attukal Bhagavathy Temple Amba Puraskaram
- 2020 - First K. Raghavan Master Foundation Award for Lifetime Achievement in Cinema
- 2021 - First Arjunan Master Award – Arjunopaharam for his contributions to Malayalam film industry.
- 2021 - Sathkarma Puraskaram by Sathkarma Charitable Organisation, Kollam.
- 2022 - Ravindra Puraskaram instituted by Ravindran Master Memorial Trust.
- 2024 - Shiva Pathmam Puraskaram
- 2024 - The Legend of Honour Award instituted by the Malayalam Cine Technicians' Association (MACTA).
- 2024 - Panchami Devi Puraskaram.
- 2024 - P Bhaskaran Smaraka Puraskaram by Navabhavana Charitable Trust.
- 2025 - Bharathiya Vidya Keerthi Puraskaram instituted by Bharathiya Vidhya Peedam School, Parassala, Thiruvananthapuram.
- 2025 - Janananma Mahathma Gandhi Cultural Forum Puraskaram
- 2025 - Narasimha Jyothi Puraskaram instituted by the Anayadi Temple Bharana Samithi.
- 2025 - Prathibha Sreshta Award by Rotary Calicut City.
- 2025 - V. Sambasivan Memorial Award instituted by the V. Sambasivan Samskarika Samithy.
- 2025 - All India Malayalee Association (AIMA) Akshara Mudra Award 2025, in recognition of the outstanding and comprehensive contributions to Malayalam Literature and Cinema.
- 2026 - A.R. Rahman and his family honored with the 'Kavyasree Award' during the 50th death anniversary of his father R. K. Shekhar.

Literary Awards

- 2003 - Revathi Pattathanam Krishnageethi Award for the book of Poems - Achante Chumbanam
- 2004 - Pravasa Kairali Literary Award ( Baharin) for the book of poems - Achante Chumbanam
- 2005 - Mahakavi Muloor Poetry Award for the book of poems - Sheershakamillaatha Kavithakal
- 2008 - Mahakavi Ulloor Award for the book - Achante Chumbanam
- 2009 - Sree Padmanabha Swami Balasahithya Award - Omanayude Oru Divasam
- 2010 - Odakkuzhal Award for the book of poems - Ammakkoru Tharattu
- 2012 - Kozhissheri Balaraman Award for Literature
- 2012 - Asan Smaraka Kavitha Puraskaram instituted by Asan Memorial Association, Chennai
- 2015 - Naimisharanym Shobhaneeyam Puraskaram for value based poetry
- 2015 - Ettumanoor Somadasan Smaraka Award
- 2016 - Vallathol Award:
- 2016 - Mayilpeeli Award for Literature
- 2016 - Thathvamasi Award in memory of Dr. Sukumar Azhikode
- 2016 - EV Krishna Pillai Memorial Award
- 2017 - Sukumar Azhikode Memorial Award instituted by 'Kannur Waves', an art and culture lovers association
- 2017 - Karyvattam Dharma Shastha Kshethra Shastha Puraskaram
- 2018 - Balamani Amma Award instituted by Kochi International Book Festival Committee in the name of poet Balamani Amma
- 2018 - Kottarathil Shankunni Memorial Award instituted by Kottarathil Shankunni Smaraka Trust .
- 2019 - Thakazhi Literary Award
- 2019 - Sahitya Kalanidhi Award, the highest honor given by the Kerala Hindi Prachar Sabha for the overall contribution in the field of literature and culture.
- 2019 - Ochira Sankaran Kutty Sahithya Puraskaram
- 2020 - Padmaprabha Literary Award
- 2021 - Pandalam Kerala Varma Literary Award.
- 2022 - Puthoor Award instituted by Unnikrishnan Puthoor Memorial Trust and Foundation.
- 2022 - Mahakavi Akkitham Puraskaram instituted by Thapasya Kala Sahithya Vedhi in memory of the late poet Akkitham Achuthan Namboothiri.
- 2023 - Thekkanappan Puraskaram .
- 2023 - Harivarasanam Award jointly instituted by the Travancore Devaswom Board (TDB) and the government of Kerala.
- 2023 - First A. R. Raja Raja Varma Puraskaram instituted by the AR Raja Raja Varma Public Library, Prayar.
- 2023 - Vayalar Award for Sreekumaran Thampi's autobiography, 'Jeevitham Oru Pendulum'
- 2023 - Basheer Balyakalasakhi literary Award instituted by the Vaikom Muhammad Basheer Smaraka Samithi (Vaikom Muhammad Basheer Memorial Committee), Thalayolaparambu.
- 2024 - Poonthanam Award
- 2024 - Honored with 2024 Nalapadan Award by Nalappadan Smaraka Samskarika Samithi in memory of Nalapat Narayana Menon for Literary Contributions to Malayalam.
- 2024 - 'Durga Bharat Samman' award presented by the Governor of West Bengal, C V Ananda Bose.
- 2025 - Malliyoor Puraskaram presented by the Akhila Bharatha Srimad Bhagavatha Satra Samiti, Guruvayur, in memory of the late Sanskrit scholar and Bhagavatham exponent, Malliyoor Sankaran Namboothiri.
- 2025 - Akshara Sooryan Puraskaram
- 2025 - Shankara Padmam Puraskaram instituted by the Thekke Madhom, which is one of the four ancient South Indian madhoms that propagate the Adwaita philosophy of Adi Shankara
- 2025 - Vaishnavam Award for literature instituted by Vaishnavam Trust in memory of popular poet Professor Vishnunarayanan Namboothiri.
- 2025 - Devarajan Master Award for contributions to Malayalam film music instituted by CETAAT (College of Engineering Trivandrum Alumni Association Trivandrum Chapter).

== Filmography ==
Year	Film	Credited as						
Year	Film	Director	Producer	Story	Screenplay	Dialogue	Lyricist	Musician
1974	Chandrakaantham	✓	✓	✓	✓	✓	✓	✗
1974	Bhoogolam Thiriyunnu	✓	✓	✓	✓	✓	✓	✗
1975	Thiruvonam	✓	✗	✓	✓	✓	✓	✗
1976	Mohiniyaattam	✓	✗	✓	✓	✓	✓	✗
1978	Etho Oru Swapnam	✓	✓	✓	✓	✓	✓	✗
1979	Maalika Paniyunnavar	✓	✓	✓	✓	✓	✓	✗
1979	Simhaasanam	✓	✓	✓	✓	✓	✓	✗
1979	Puthiya Velicham	✓	✗	✓	✓	✓	✓	✗
1979	Venalil Oru Mazha	✓	✗	✗	✓	✓	✓	✗
1979	Jeevitham Oru Gaanam	✓	✗	✓	✓	✓	✓	✗
1980	Idimuzhakkam	✓	✓	✓	✓	✓	✓	✗
1980	Ambalavilakku	✓	✗	✓	✓	✓	✓	✗
1980	Swantham Enna Padam	✓	✗	✓	✓	✓	✓	✗
1980	Naayattu	✓	✗	✗	✓	✓	✓	✗
1981	Munnettam	✓	✗	✓	✓	✓	✓	✗
1981	Arikkaari Ammu	✓	✗	✗	✓	✓	✓	✗
1981	Munnettam	✓	✗	✓	✓	✓	✓	✗
1981	Aakramanam	✓	✓	✓	✓	✓	✓	✗
1981	Ammakkorumma	✓	✓	✓	✓	✓	✓	✗
1982	Enikkum Oru Divasam	✓	✓	✓	✓	✓	✓	✗
1982	Gaanam	✓	✓	✓	✓	✓	✓	✗
1982	Irattimadhuram	✓	✗	✓	✓	✓	✓	✗
1983	Aadhipathyam	✓	✗	✓	✓	✓	✓	✗
1985	Vilichu Vili Kettu	✓	✓	✓	✓	✓	✓	✗
1985	Onde Raktha (Kannada)	✓	✓	✓	✓	✗	Dubbed version	✗
1986	Yuvajanotsavam	✓	✓	✓	✓	✓	✓	✗
1986	Amme Bhagavathi	✓	✗	✓	✓	✓	✓	✗
1990	Appu	✗	✗	✓	✓	✓	✓	✗
1993	Bandhukkal Sathrukkal	✓	✓	✓	✓	✓	✓	✓
2015	Ammakkoru Tharattu	✓	✓	✓	✓	✓	✓	✓
