= Mannar, Alappuzha =

Town in Kerala, India

Mannar
- Census Town
- Nickname: The Bell Metal Town
- Location in Kerala, India Mannar (India)
- Coordinates: 9°18′0″N 76°32′0″E
- Country: India
- State: Kerala
- District: Alappuzha

Government
  - Body: Panchayat

Area
  - Total: 8 km^{2} (3.1 sq mi)

Population (2011)
  - Total: 17,067
  - Density: 2,100/km^{2} (5,500/sq mi)

Languages
  - Official: Malayalam, English
- Time zone: UTC+5:30 (IST)
- PIN: 689622
- Vehicle registration: KL-30
- Nearest city: Thiruvalla
- Lok Sabha constituency: Mavelikara

Mannar is a census town in Chengannur Taluk in Alappuzha District of Kerala state, India, on State Highway 6. It is also known as the Bell Metal Town.

== Location ==
Mannar is located on the banks of the Pamba River, Manimala River and Achankovil river. Mannar is 11 km from Chengannur, Thiruvalla, Haripad and 8 km from Mavelikara. It is connected by four railway stations (Chengannur, Thiruvalla, Harippad and Mavelikara) at a distance of 8 to 9 km each on four sides. Parumala Jn:, Kuttiyil Jn:, Muttel Jn:, Aalum moottil Jn:, Koyickal Jn: and Store Jn: are the main junctions in Mannar.

== Historical Importance of Mannar ==
Mannar was the venue for the famous Treaty of Mannar (Mannar Harmony Deed) signed between Maharaja of Travancore Marthanda Varma and Kayamkulam King in 1742. After this deed Kayamkulam and a major portion of central travancore became the part of Travancore Kingdom.

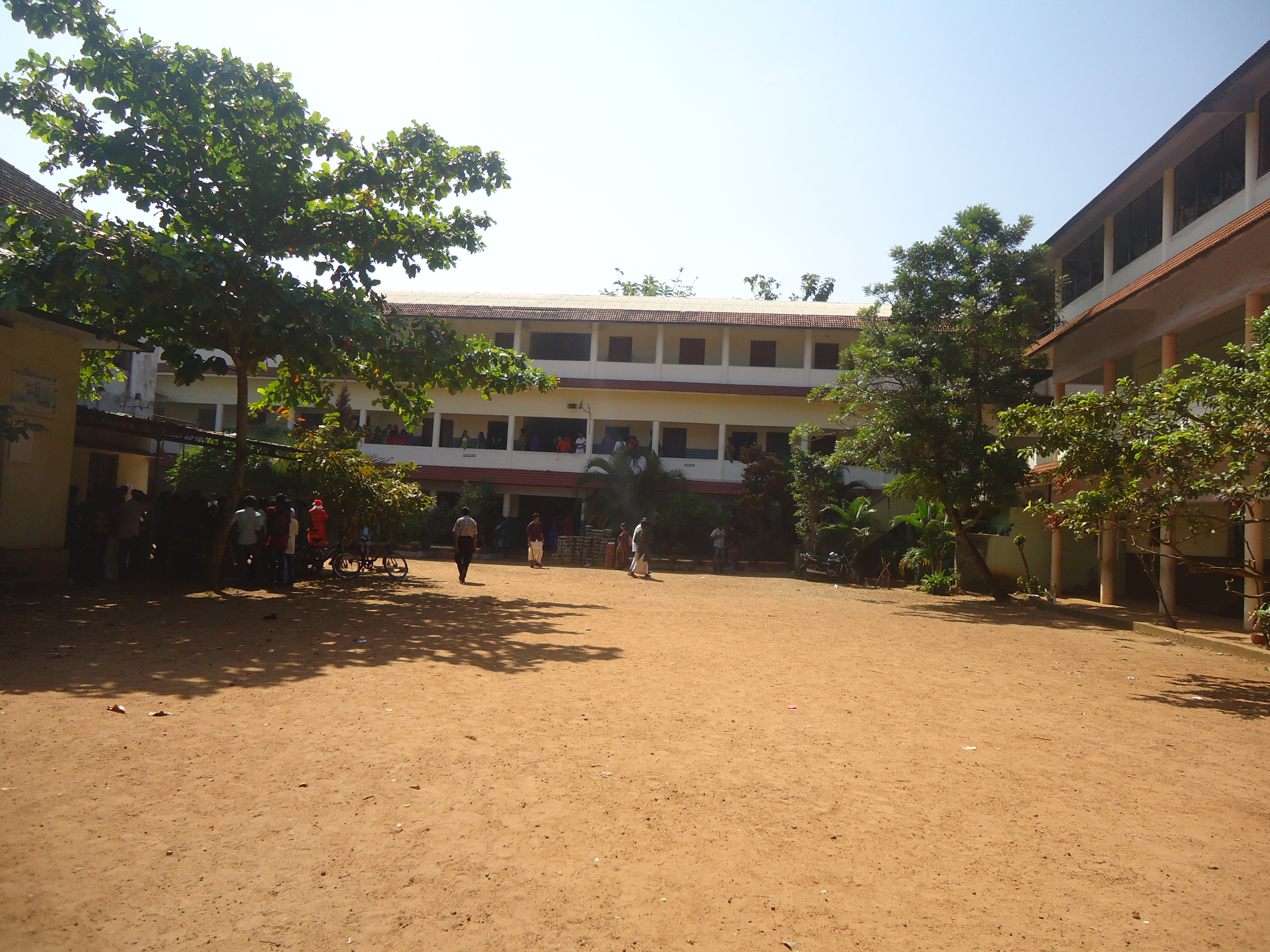
NSS School, Mannar

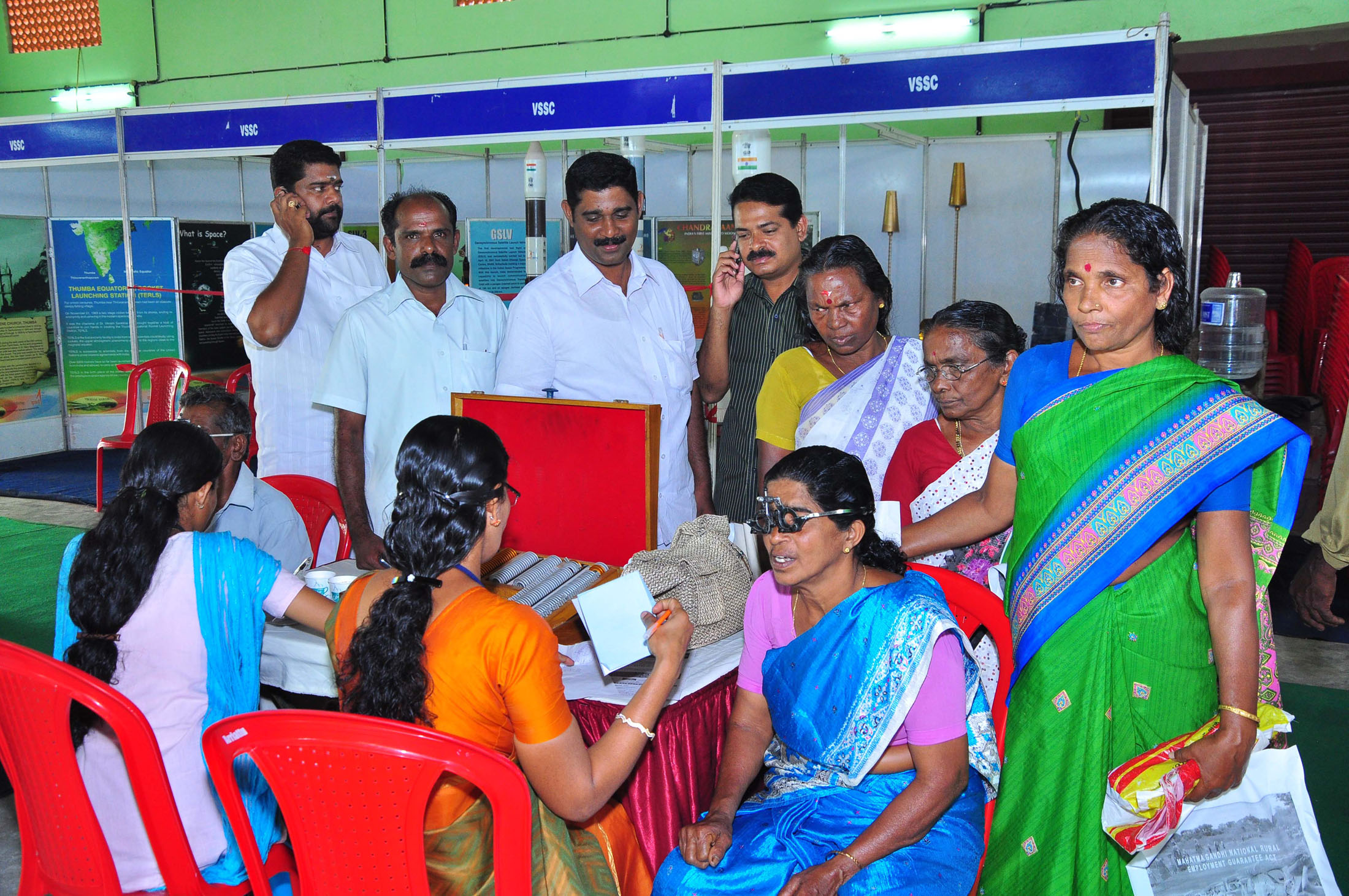
A medical camp at Mannar, 2011

== Demographics ==
As of 2011 Census, Mannar had a population of 17,067 with 7,869 males and 9,198 females. Mannar census town has an area of 8 km^{2} (3.1 sq mi) with 4,564 families residing in it. The average female sex ratio was 1169 higher than the state average of 1084. 8% of the population was under 6 years of age. Mannar had an average literacy of 96.4% higher than the state average of 94%; male literacy was 97.7% and female literacy was 95.2%.

== Industry ==
=== Traditional bronze metal industry ===
Mannar is well known for its bronze industry, as well as other metals. There are hundreds of traditional 'ALA'S'(kilns or furnaces) in Mannar. There are many small-scale manufacturing establishments engaged in this business, employing traditional workers, where prospective buyers can visit, observe the making and then purchase the artefacts produced. The most important household utensil they used to make are kinnan (plates for taking foods like kanji and boiled rice), nilavilakk, uruli, chempi (for par boiling paddy), kindi (a vessel for taking water for washing hands and feet). The most famous utensil makers were Chinkili Achari and Kollan Neelakantan Achari. There was an expert craftsman Kurattiyil Neelakantan Achari, who made the minutest gold ornaments. Later industry shifted to manufacturing big size artefacts and craftsmen from this town created many well known artefacts, such as a Varpu displayed at Delhi Museum, the lamp at Kuravilangad Church, the lamp of Chettikulangara Devi Temple, the bell at Simla Temple, the bell at Cathedral Church, New Delhi and a replica of famous tree of life and knowledge. This town is second only to market leader manufacturing city Moradabad.

=== Alind Switchgear Division ===
The Aluminium Industries Limited came into existence, on 2 January 1946, promoted by then Seshasayee Group with its Conductor Division set up in Kundra, Kerala under technical collaboration from the world-renowned ALCAN, Canada, The Aluminium Development Laboratories U.K. and ALCAN S.A., Zurich, Switzerland. Since then, Alind has produced more than a million kilometres of AAC, ACSR and AAAC conductors building the lifelines of power in India and aboard, and hence Alind could rightly call itself "The Power Movers."

Presently Alind with its Corporate Office in Mumbai has manufacturing units located in the three states of Kerala, Odisha and Andhra Pradesh manufacturing cables and conductors, steel wires, wire-working machinery, high-voltage switchgears and static relays, Export Division, Consultancy and Engineering Services Division.

== Temples ==
=== Parumala Valiya Panayannarkavu Devi Temple ===
Parumala Valiya Panayannarkavu Devi Temple is an ancient Hindu temple dedicated to Sri Badrakali and Lord Shiva is situated on the banks of the Pampa river at Parumala of Pathanamthitta District in Kerala state in India.

The Panaynararkavu Temple is one of the three most important Bhadrakali temples in Kerala. Thirumandhamkunnu Temple in Malabar, Kodungallur Temple in Cochin and Panayannarkavu Temple in Travancore is almost equally important.

The ancient Panayannar Kavu Devi temple, worshipping "Saptha Matha", is famous for its Sarpa kavu and mural painting drawn on Sricovil. One of these paintings became the cover page for Sri. E.M.S. Nampoothripad's biography (veteran Communist leader and ex-chief minister of Kerala). The annual Vishu Festival attracts many pilgrims.

=== Parumala Pally ===
The St. Peter and St. Paul's Church, Parumala is famous pilgrim centre in India due to the Tomb of St Gregorios of Parumala, who was the first declared saint in India. 1 and 2 November is the Feast of St Gregorios Parumala will attract pilgrims from across the world. The church is one of the biggest churches in India. The Parumala Seminary was started by St Gregorios of Parumala.

=== Thrikkuratti Mahadeva Temple ===
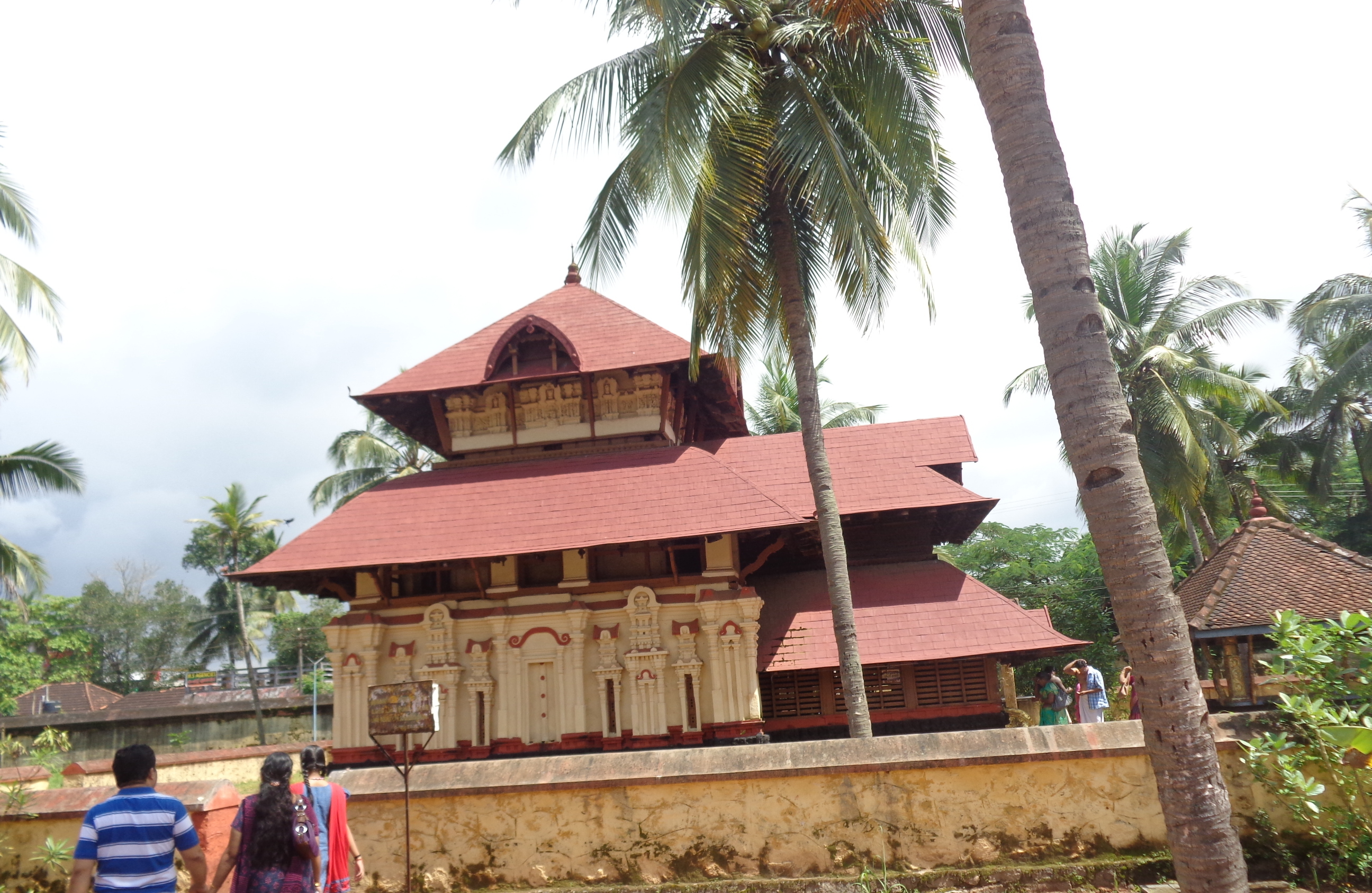
Krishna Temple, Mannar

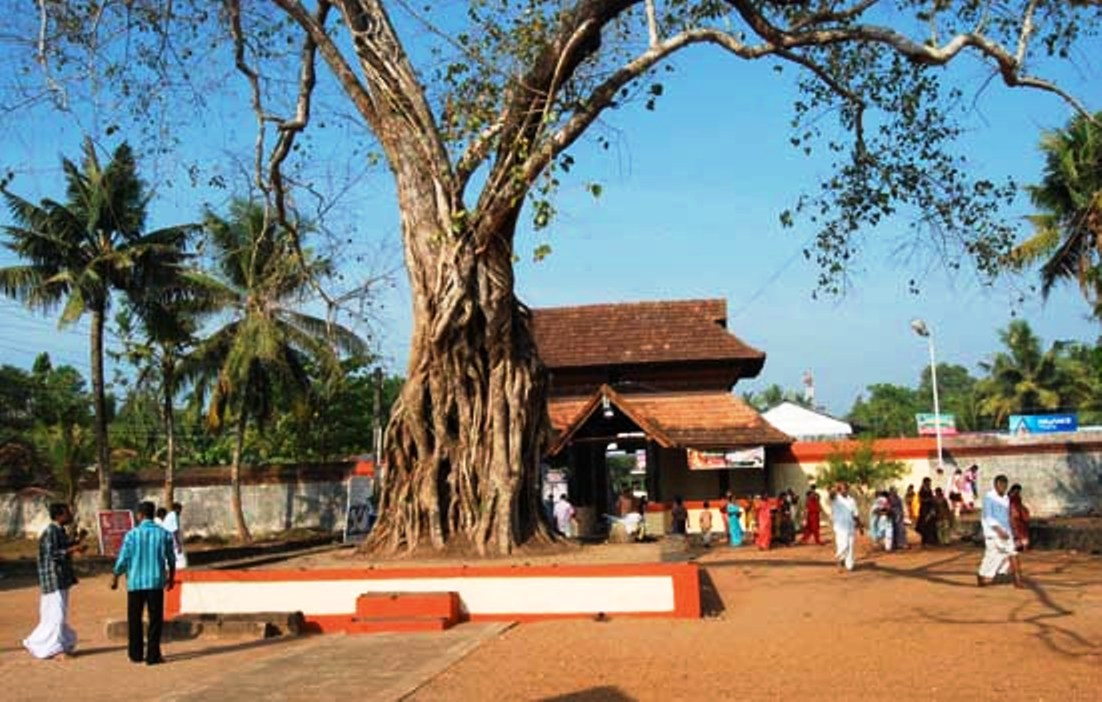
Mahadheva Temple, Mannar

Thrikkuratti Mahadeva Temple is one of the 108 sivalays built by Lord Parasurama. It is believed that the mammoth temple compound wall was built by a troupe of Bhootas of Lord Paramasiva in one night. The unique festivities of Thrikkuratti temple (Sahasra kalasam, Maikatti puja and Sivarathri Nritham) attract many pilgrims. The antique wooden carving of Thrikkuratti mahadeva temple Sricovil was featured in visual media, attracting lot of art lovers including foreigners. At a special Nada (gate) on the east side of the Thrikkuratti temple compound wall, other religious members, in particular, Muslims, present offerings on a daily basis. This practice is believed to be centuries old and is considered to be a true embodiment of religious harmony. The Thrikkuratti Mahasivarathri Festival, second only to Aluva Sivarathri in terms of mass congregation, attracts thousands of devotees. The West Nada (Parvathi) will be open for ten minutes during Sivarathri Nritham on Sivarathri day only. All other days during the year it remains closed. The Srikovil of Thrikkuratti Mahavishnu temple is built on typical kerala style Architecture.

=== Other temples and churches ===
Religious sites in and around Mannar include

- the famous Panayannar Kavu Devi temple
- Mannar Puthenpally Juma Masjid (Town masjid)
- Thrikkuratti Mahadeva Temple
- Mannar Juma Masjid
- Kurattikkadu Pattambalam Devi Temple
- Pattambalam
- Eramathoor Mahadeva temple
- Eramathoor Pattambalam Devi Temple
- Eramathoor Suryadeva Temple
- Oorumadom Bhadrakaali Temple
- Vishavarsherikkara Subrahmanya Swami Temple
- Thirppavor Mahavishnu Temple
- Pothuvoor Bhadrakaali Temple
- Viruppil Devi Temple
- 553-no SNDP Pavukkara Temple
- Edayadi Bhadrkaali Temple
- Chakkulathu Kavu Devi Temple
- Kunnathoor Devi Temple
- Kottarkavu Devi temple
- Kurattikkadu Vilayil Mahadeva Temple
- 72-No.SNDP Kurattikkadu Temple
- Kurattikkadu Thevarickal Mahadeva Temple
- Memadom Sreekrishnaswami Temple
- Kurattikkadu Sree Dharam Shastha Temple
- Kurattikkadu Mutharamman Devi Temple
- Kurattikkadu Valiyachan Temple
- Kurattikkadu Tevarmannam Temple
- Kaleeckal Valiyachan Temple
- Parumala Church
- St. Thomas church Pavukkara
- St. Peter's Catholic church Pavukkara
- Valyachan Kavu Muttumpattu
- Orthodox church Muttel Jn
- The Aalthara Ganapathy temple at Kannamkavil Muthaaramman Temple, near Thrikkuratti temple attracts many devotees, in particular motorists. Vinayaga Chathurthy Festival is the major festival celebrated at Aalthara Ganapathy Temple. Manjal Neerattu conducted during Kumbha Bharani festival at Kannamkavil Mutharamman temple is a major attraction for many devotees.
- The Eramathoor Soorya temple is believed to centuries old and is known for being one of the three known temples in Kerala dedicated to deity "Surya" (Sun God). The Adithya Ponkala conducted at this temple attracts many female devotees from South Kerala.
- Kurattikadu Pattambalam Devi Temple
- Kurattikkadu Mutharamman Devi Temple
- Thrippavoor MahaVishnu Temple
- The famous Parumala church or St.Peter's and St.Paul's Church is dedicated to Saint Gregorios of Parumala (Gheevarghese Mar Gregorios of Parumala), who is also popularly known as 'Parumala Thirumeni'. Parumala Church or St.Paul's and St.Peter's Church is located in east Mannar.
- Valyachan kavu situated beside Muttumpattu road.

== Events ==
Thrikkuratti Mahadeva temple Shivarathri is celebrated as the biggest and famous event held in Mannar every year, attracting thousands of devotees.

The Anpoli conducted as part of festival in Devi temples are another attraction and unique one. Among the Anpoli festivals Anpoli Areeppara Mahothsavam of Kurattikkadu Pattambalam Devi Kshethram is the most famous, attracting thousands of devotees on Medam 24th (7 May). Here Bhadra kali is worshipped is called valiyamma by devotees. The festival at Pattambalam starts on Medam 10th (23 April) and ends on Medam 25th (8 May). The festival includes several rituals like AttilChattam, Changayilottam, Vithideel which aren't practised anywhere else in the world. Among these, Attil Chattam attracts Muslim devotees and kalamezhuthum pattum is conducted every malayalamasam on thiruvathira nakshatra as well. The annual Mahathma Boat Race, conducted during Onam festival season, attracts lot of visitors and water sports lovers including foreigners.

== Education ==
Mannar has well known educational institutions like Dewaswom Board Pampa College, Nair Samajam Higher Secondary School, Nair Samajam Teacher Training Institute, Nair Samajam High Schools (one of the oldest schools in Central Travancore), Sree Bhuvaneswari English Medium School and Good Shepherd School. The Mannar Library at Kuttiyil Junction is a full-fledged library, equipped with many reference books.

Mannar Nair Samajam School was started in the year 1903. It was established by the initiative of Vechooreth V S Krishna Pillai who had stated it first in his house with 20 pupils in 1902. Old stalwarts like Puthuppally Krishna Pillai, Kainikara Brothers, Makkappuzha Vasudevan Pillai and many great leaders studied there. K P Krishna Menon was the Second Headmaster of the School, the First being Cherian Sar, father of erstwhile Minister George. There was no discrimination between the high class and harijans for studying in the schools. Fees concessions were also given to the poor students.

=== Sree Bhuvaneswari Higher Secondary School ===
Sree Bhuvaneswari Higher Secondary School, managed by the Kurattikadu Pattambalam Devaswam, was founded in 1974 with LKG classes and has now grown into a cluster of schools comprising the Sree Bhuvaneswari Sisu Vidyalayam: the nursery, Sree Bhuvaneswari English Medium High School, Sree Bhuvaneswari Higher Secondary School and Sree Bhuvaneswari CBSE School.

=== N.S.H.S. For Boys, Mannar ===
Nair Samajam High School For Boys, Mannar Panchayat, Mannar, Alleppy Dist. Kerala State Syllabus: STATE Medium: Malayalam class: 5–10

=== N.S.H.S. For Girls, Mannar ===
Nair Samajam High School For Girls, Mannar Panchayat, Mannar, Alleppy Dist. Kerala State Syllabus: STATE Medium: Malayalam

=== M.D.L.P.School, Muttel Junction ===
Mannar Syrian Lower Primary School, Muttel Junction, Kuttemperoor P.O., Mannar, Alleppy Dist. Kerala Syllabus: STATE Medium: Malayalam

=== K.U.P.School, Pavukkara ===
Pavukkara PO, Mannar, Alleppy Dist. Kerala Syllabus: STATE Medium: Malayalam class: 1–7

=== M.D.L.P.School, Pavukkara ===
Pavukkara PO, Mannar, Alleppy Dist. Kerala Syllabus: STATE Medium: Malayalam

=== D.B College Parumala Mannar ===
Devaswom Board Pampa College, Parumala, is a government-aided private college managed by the Travancore Devaswom Board. It offers graduate and postgraduate degrees in various arts and science subjects. D.B College Parumala Mannar

== Government Services in Mannar ==
- Grama Panchayat Office
- Police station
- Village Office
- Post Office
- Telephone Exchange

== Government Hospitals ==
- Govt. General Hospital
- Govt. Ayurveda Hospital

== See Also ==
- Ramji Rao Speaking, which features the popular character Mannar Mathai, played by Innocent.

== Related links ==
- Pathanamthitta
- Parumala St. Gregorious Cardiovascular Centre
- (THE SAINT OF PARUMALA) History of Parumala Thirumeni
- Parumala St. Gregorious Hospital
- Chakkulathu Kavu Devi Temple
