= List of Malayalam films of 1975 =

The following is a list of Malayalam films released in the year 1975.

Opening		Sl. No.	Film	Cast	Director	Music director	Notes
J A N	3	1	Chief Guest	Prem Nazir, Jayabharathi	A. B. Raj	A. T. Ummer	
J A N	3	2	Swarnna Malsyam	Madhu, Jayabharathi	B. K. Pottekkad	M. S. Baburaj	
J A N	16	3	Bhaaryaye Aavashyamundu	Prameela, Sathar	M. Krishnan Nair	M. S. Baburaj	
J A N	17	4	Love Letter	Sudheer, Vidhubala	Dr. Balakrishnan	K. J. Joy	
J A N	23	5	Aaranya Kandam	Prem Nazir, Srividya	J. Sasikumar	A. T. Ummer	
J A N	30	6	Chalanum	KPAC Lalitha, Lakshmi,	N. R. Pillai	G. Devarajan	
J A N	31	7	Thaamarathoni	Prem Nazir, Jayabharathi	Crossbelt Mani	R. K. Shekhar	
F E B	7	8	Pravaham	Prem Nazir, Vidhubala	J. Sasikumar	M. K. Arjunan	
F E B	14	9	Malsaram	Raghavan, Mancheri Chandran	K. Narayanan	M. K. Arjunan	
F E B	21	10	Madhurappathinezhu	Sudheer, Sumithra	Hariharan	A. T. Ummer	
F E B	28	11	Manishada	Prem Nazir, Srividya	Kunchacko	G. Devarajan	
M A R	14	12	Chumaduthangi	Prem Nazir, Sukumaran	P. Bhaskaran	G. Devarajan	
M A R	14	13	Mucheettukalikkaarante Makal	Ranichandra, Bahadoor	Thoppil Bhasi	G. Devarajan	
M A R	21	14	Chuvanna Sandhyakal	Adoor Bhasi, Lakshmi,	K. S. Sethumadhavan	G. Devarajan	
M A R	21	15	Kalyaanappanthal	Vidhubala, Sudheer	Dr. Balakrishnan	A. T. Ummer	
M A R	28	16	Akkaldaama	Madhu, Srividya	Madhu	Shyam	
A P R	11	17	Love Marriage	Prem Nazir, Jayabharathi	Hariharan	Ahuan Sebastian	
A P R	11	18	Picnic	Prem Nazir, Lakshmi,	J. Sasikumar	M. K. Arjunan	
A P R	11	19	Uttarayanam	Adoor Bhasi, Sukumaran	G. Aravindan	K. Raghavan	
A P R	14	20	Ninne Pinne Kandolaam		Puthuran		
A P R	18	21	Criminals	Vincent, Manavalan Joseph	S. Babu	M. S. Baburaj	
A P R	25	22	Niramaala	KPAC Lalitha, Raghavan	P. Ramdas	M. K. Arjunan	
M A Y	2	23	Athidhi	Sheela, P. J. Antony	K. P. Kumaran	G. Devarajan	
M A Y	2	24	Tourist Bungalow	Prem Nazir, Jayabharathi	A. B. Raj	M. K. Arjunan	
M A Y	7	25	Hello Darling	Prem Nazir, Jayabharathi	A. B. Raj	M. K. Arjunan	
M A Y	9	26	Kalyana Sougandhikam	Jayabharathi, Adoor Bhasi	P. Vijayan	Pukazhenthi	
M A Y	16	27	Bhaarya Illaatha Raathri	Thikkurissy Sukumaran Nair, Hari	Babu Nanthankodu	G. Devarajan	
M A Y	16	28	Paalazhi Madhanam	Prem Nazir, Jayabharathi	J. Sasikumar	G. Devarajan	
M A Y	23	29	Kottaaram Vilkkaanundu	Prem Nazir, Jayabharathi	K. Suku	G. Devarajan	
M A Y	23	30	Ullasa Yaathra	Jayan, Sheela Ravikumar	A. B. Raj	M. S. Viswanathan	
M A Y	30	31	Pennpada	K. P. Ummar, Rajakokila, Reena	Crossbelt Mani	R. K. Shekhar	
M A Y	30	32	Sammanam	Prem Nazir, Madhu	J. Sasikumar	V. Dakshinamoorthy	
J U N	13	33	Boy Friend	Vidhubala, Vincent	P. Venu	G. Devarajan	
J U N	20	34	Chandanachola	Vidhubala, Sudheer	Jeassy	K. J. Joy	
J U N	20	35	Prayanam	Mohan Sharma, Kottarakkara Sreedharan Nair	Bharathan	M. B. Sreenivasan	
J U N	27	36	Odakkuzhal	Sheela, Jose Prakash	P. N. Menon	M. K. Arjunan	
J U L	4	37	Chattambikkalyaani	Prem Nazir, Lakshmi, Jagathy Sreekumar	J. Sasikumar	M. K. Arjunan	
J U L	16	38	Kabani Nadi Chuvannappol	T. V. Chandran, Salam Karassery	P. A. Backer	Devarajan	
J U L	19	39	Thomasleeha	Mohan Sharma, Thikkurissy Sukumaran Nair	P. A. Thomas	Salil Chowdhury	
J U L	25	40	Njan Ninne Premikkunnu	Kamalahasan, Girija	K. S. Gopalakrishnan	M. S. Baburaj	
J U L	25	41	Pulivalu	Prem Nazir, Jayabharathi	J. Sasikumar	M. K. Arjunan	
A U G	1	42	Neela Ponman	Prem Nazir, Sumithra	Kunchacko	Salil Chowdhary	
A U G	7	43	Alibabayum 41 Kallanmaarum	Prem Nazir, Jayabharathi	J. Sasikumar	G. Devarajan	
A U G	15	44	Ayodhya	Prem Nazir, K. R. Vijaya	P. N. Sundaram	G. Devarajan	
A U G	17	45	Swami Ayyappan	Madhu, Lakshmi, Sukumari	P. Subramaniam	G. Devarajan	
A U G	20	46	Dharmakshetre Kurukshetre	Prem Nazir, Jayabharathi	Kunchacko	M. S. Viswanathan	
S E P	5	47	Sooryavamsham	Prem Nazir, Jayabharathi	A. B. Raj	M. K. Arjunan	
S E P	12	48	Velicham Akale	Vincent, Cochin Haneefa	Crossbelt Mani	R. K. Shekhar	
S E P	19	49	Priyamulla Sophia	Prem Nazir, KPAC Lalitha	A. Vincent	G. Devarajan	
S E P	26	50	Kaamam Krodham Moham	Madhu, Jayabharathi	Madhu	Shyam	
O C T	2	51	Raagam	Sharada, Lakshmi	A. Bhimsingh	Salil Chowdhary	
O C T	2	52	Rasaleela	Kamal Haasan, Jayasudha	N. Sankaran Nair	Salil Choudhry	
O C T	2	53	Thiruvonam	Prem Nazir, Sharada	Sreekumaran Thampi	M. K. Arjunan	
O C T	10	54	Makkal	Jayabharathi, Kaviyoor Ponnamma	K. S. Sethumadhavan	G. Devarajan	
O C T	10	55	Sathyathinte Nizhalil	Sudheer, Ushanandini	Babu Nandancode	V. Dakshinamoorthy	
O C T	24	56	Omanakkunju	Madhu, Sheela	A. B. Raj	M. K. Arjunan	
O C T	31	57	Babumon	Prem Nazir, Jayabharathi	Hariharan	M. S. Viswanathan	
N O V	7	58	Ashtamirohini	Prem Nazir, Unnimery	A. B. Raj	M. K. Arjunan	
N O V	14	59	Padmaragam	Prem Nazir, Jayabharathi	J. Sasikumar	M. K. Arjunan	
N O V	21	60	Utsavam	Srividya, K. P. Ummer	I. V. Sasi	A. T. Ummer	
N O V	27	61	Mattoru Seetha	Kamal Haasan, Roja Ramani	P. Bhaskaran	V. Dakshinamoorthy	
N O V	28	62	Sindhu	Prem Nazir, Madhu Lakshmi,	J. Sasikumar	M. K. Arjunan	
D E C	12	63	Priye Ninakku Vendi	Jayabharathi, Sukumaran	Mallikarjuna Rao	R. K. Shekhar	
D E C	24	64	Cheenavala	Prem Nazir, Jayabharathi	Kunchacko	M. K. Arjunan	
D E C	25	65	Abhimaanam	Prem Nazir, Sharada	J. Sasikumar	A. T. Ummer	
D E C	25	66	Kuttichaathan	Vincent, Sreelatha Namboothiri	Crossbelt Mani	R. K. Shekhar	
D E C	25	67	Hotel Kaveri	ടreenath			

== Dubbed films ==
Movie	Director	Cast	Music	Lyrics
Aval Oru Thudarkatha	K. Balachander	Kamal Haasan, Sujatha, Vijaya Kumar, Sri Priya, M. G. Soman	M. S. Viswanathan	Kannadasan
Kallante Kamuki	V. Madhusoodhanan		V. Dakshinamoorthy	P. Bhaskaran
Kudumbavilakku	P. Chandrasekharan		M. K. Arjunan	Sreekumaran Thampi
Hotel Kaveri				Poochakkal Shahul Hameed
Makalo Marumakalo	Lakshmi Deepak			
Prana Sakhi	T. K. Prasad		A. T. Ummer	Sreekumaran Thampi
Prema Mudra	Raghavendra Rao			
Rahasya Vivaham	(dubbing)			
Sree Rama Hanuman Yudham	Babu			
Swandam Kariyum Zindabad	C. S. Rao			
Veendum Vasantham	T. Ramarao			
