= List of Malayalam films of 1972 =

The following is a list of Malayalam films released in the year 1972.

Opening		Sl. No.	Film	Cast	Director	Music director	Notes
J A N	14	1	Prathikaram	Jayabharathi, Thikkurissy Sukumaran Nair	Kumar	M. B. Sreenivasan	
F E B	4	2	Aaradimanninte Janmi	Prem Nazir, Madhu	P. Bhaskaran	R. K. Shekhar	
F E B	5	3	Panimudakku	Madhu, Ammini	P. N. Menon	M. S. Baburaj	
F E B	5	4	Devi	Prem Nazir, Madhu	K. S. Sethumadhavan	G. Devarajan	
F E B	11	5	Kandavarundo	Sadhana, Vincent	Mallikarjuna Rao	R. K. Shekhar	
F E B	18	6	Pushpanjali	Prem Nazir	J. Sasikumar	M. K. Arjunan	
M A R	9	7	Maaya	Prem Nazir, Sharada	Ramu Kariat	V. Dakshinamoorthy	
M A R	16	8	Manthrakodi	Prem Nazir, Vijayasree	M. Krishnan Nair	M. S. Viswanathan	
M A R	24	9	Manushyabandhangal	Prem Nazir, Madhu	Crossbelt Mani	V. Dakshinamoorthy	
M A R	30	10	Baalyaprathijna	Sathyan, Sheela	A. S. Nagarajan	K. K. Antony	
A P R	1	11	Professor	Sharada, Gemini Ganesan	P. Subramaniam	G. Devarajan	
A P R	6	12	Preethi	Madhu, Sheela	William Thomas	A. T. Ummer	
A P R	14	13	Taxi Car	Prem Nazir, Sadhana	P. Venu	R. K. Shekhar	
A P R	14	14	Aromalunni	Prem Nazir, Ummer, Vijayasree	Kunchacko	G. Devarajan	
A P R	28	15	Omana	Prem Nazir, Ravichandran,	J. D. Thottan	G. Devarajan	
A P R	28	16	Mayiladumkunnu	Prem Nazir, Jayabharathi	S. Babu	G. Devarajan	
M A Y	5	17	Naadan Premam	Madhu, Sheela	Crossbelt Mani	V. Dakshinamoorthy	
M A Y	12	18	Pullimaan	Madhu, Devika	E. N. Balakrishnan	M. S. Baburaj	
M A Y	19	19	Vidhyarthikale Ithile Ithile	Madhu, Jayabharathi	John Abraham	M. B. Sreenivasan	
M A Y	26	20	Kalippava	Sathyan, Kaviyoor Ponnamma	A. B. Raj	B. A. Chidambaranath	
J U N	20	21	Sambhavami Yuge Yuge	Prem Nazir, Ummer, Adoor Bhasi	A. B. Raj	M. S. Baburaj	
J U N	23	22	Iniyoru Janmam Tharu	Jayabharathi, Adoor Bhasi	K. Vijayan	M. B. Sreenivasan	
J U L	7	23	Chembarathi	Madhu, Roja Ramani, Sudheer, Raghavan	P. N. Menon	Devarajan	
J U L	21	24	Achanum Bappayum	K. P. Ummer, Jayabharathi	K. S. Sethumadhavan	Devarajan	
J U L	28	25	Oru Sundariyude Katha	Prem Nazir, Jayabharathi	Thoppil Bhasi	G. Devarajan	
J U L	29	26	Akkarapacha	Sathyan, Jayabharathi	M. M. Nesan	G. Devarajan	
A U G	4	27	Miss Mary	Prem Nazir, Renuka	Jambu	R. K. Shekhar	
A U G	11	28	Thottilla	Jayabharathi, Kottarakkara Sreedharan Nair	Karmachandran	R. K. Shekhar	
A U G	18	29	Punarjanmam	Prem Nazir, Jayabharathi	K. S. Sethumadhavan	Devarajan	
A U G	23	30	Maravil Thirivu Sookshikkuka	Prem Nazir, Vijayasree	J. Sasikumar	G. Devarajan	
A U G	23	31	Gandharavakshetram	Prem Nazir, Madhu	A. Vincent	G. Devarajan	
S E P	9	32	Nrithasala	Prem Nazir, Jayabharathi	A. B. Raj	V. Dakshinamoorthy	
S E P	11	33	Sree Guruvayoorappan	Gemini Ganesan, Sharada, Kaviyoor Ponnamma	P. Subramaniam	V. Dakshinamoorthy	
S E P	22	34	Azhimukham	Jayabharathi, Cochin Haneefa	P. Vijayan	M. S. Baburaj	
S E P	29	35	Aadhyathe Katha	Prem Nazir, Vijayasree	K. S. Sethumadhavan	M. K. Arjunan	
O C T	6	36	Anweshanam	Prem Nazir, Sharada	J. Sasikumar	M. K. Arjunan	
O C T	12	37	Snehadeepame Mizhi Thurakku	Madhu, Sharada	P. Bhaskaran	Pukazhenthi	
O C T	13	38	Brahmachari	Prem Nazir, Sharada	J. Sasikumar	V. Dakshinamoorthy	
O C T	27	39	Ananthasayanam	Sheela, Jayabharathi	K. Suku	K. Raghavan	
N O V	10	40	Puthrakameshti	Madhu, Sheela	Crossbelt Mani	V. Dakshinamoorthy	
N O V	10	41	Lakshyam	Sathyan, Madhu	Jipson	M. K. Arjunan	
N O V	24	42	Swayamvaram	Madhu, Sharada	Adoor Gopalakrishnan	M. B. Sreenivasan	
D E C	8	43	Sathi	Madhu, Jayabharathi	Madhu	V. Dakshinamoorthy	
D E C	22	44	Sakthi	Sheela, Ravichandran	Crossbelt Mani	V. Dakshinamoorthy	
D E C	22	45	Theerthayathra	Madhu, Sharada, Sudheer	A. Vincent	A. T. Ummer	
D E C	22	46	Postmane Kananilla	Prem Nazir, K. P. Ummer	Kunchacko	G. Devarajan	
D E C	27	47	Mappusakshi	Madhu, Jayabharathi	P. N. Menon	M. S. Baburaj |	

== Dubbed Films ==
Sl No	Date	Movies	Director	Story	Screenplay	Main actors	Basic Language	Notes
1	08/09	Upaharam	Sudhendu Roy (S. Roy)			Jaya Bhaduri, Swaroop Dutt	Hindi	
