= Chattambikkalyaani =

1975 film

- Theatrical release poster
- Directed by: J. Sasikumar
- Written by: Sreekumaran Thampi; M. P. Raji
- Screenplay by: Sreekumaran Thampi
- Produced by: Sreekumaran Thampi
- Starring: Prem Nazir; Jagathy Sreekumar; Lakshmi; KPAC Lalitha; Adoor Bhasi
- Cinematography: J. G. Vijayam
- Edited by: K. Sankunni
- Music by: M. K. Arjunan
- Production company: Bhavani Rajeswari
- Distributed by: Bhavani Rajeswari
- Release date: 4 July 1975
- Country: India
- Language: Malayalam

Chattambikkalyaani (transl. Rowdy Kalyani) is a 1975 Indian Malayalam film, directed by J. Sasikumar and produced by Sreekumaran Thampi. The film stars Prem Nazir, Lakshmi, K. P. Ummer and M. G. Soman in the lead roles. The film has musical score by M. K. Arjunan.

== Cast ==
- Prem Nazir as Gopi/CID Narendranath
- Lakshmi as Kalyani
- K. P. Ummer as Vaasu
- M. G. Soman as Kochu Thamburan
- Veeran as Chembakasseri Thirumanassu
- Thikkurussi Sukumaran Nair as Daivam Mathai
- T. R. Omana as Sethutty
- Jagathy Sreekumar as Pappu
- KPAC Lalitha as Gracy
- Sreelatha Namboothiri as Lilly
- T. S. Muthaiah as Pareed
- Alummoodan as Marmam Mammad
- Adoor Bhasi as Shareeram Kuttappan
- Philomina as Pathumma Beegam
- Kuthiravattam Pappu as Kochappan
- Baby Sumathi as Young Kalyani
- Master Raghu as Young Vaasu
- Nilamboor Balan as James
- J. A. R. Anand as Khader
- Jayakumari as Devi
- Khadeeja as Paaru
- Kunchan as Chotta Sulthan
- Surasu as Settu

== Soundtrack ==
All lyrics are written by Sreekumaran Thampi; all music is composed by M. K. Arjunan.

No.	Title	Artist(s)	Length
1.	"Ammamaare Vishakkunnu"	P. Leela, Latha Devi
2.	"Jayikkaanaay Janichavan"	Jolly Abraham
3.	"Kannil Elivaanam"	P. Jayachandran, K. P. Brahmanandan, Latha Devi
4.	"Naalukaalulloru"	P. Madhuri
5.	"Poovinu Kopam Vannaal"	K. J. Yesudas
6.	"Sindooram Thudikkunna"	K. J. Yesudas
7.	"Tharivalakal"	P. Jayachandran
