= Madhura Swapanam =

- Poster
- Directed by: M. Krishnan Nair
- Written by: K. P. Kottarakkara
- Screenplay by: K. P. Kottarakkara
- Produced by: K. P. Kottarakkara
- Starring: Kamal Haasan; Ravikumar; Jayaprabha; Unni Mary; Prema; Sukumari; Jose Prakash
- Music by: M. K. Arjunan
- Production company: Ganesh Pictures
- Distributed by: Joly Release
- Release date: 3 March 1977
- Country: India
- Language: Malayalam

Madhura Swapanam (transl. Sweet Dream) is a 1977 Indian Malayalam-language film, directed by M. Krishnan Nair and produced by K. P. Kottarakkara. The film stars Kamal Haasan, Ravikumar, Jayaprabha, Unni Mary, Sukumari, Jose Prakash and Prema. The film has musical score by M. K. Arjunan. It was a remake of Telugu film Alludochadu.

== Cast ==
- Kamal Haasan
- Ravikumar
- Unni Mary
- Jayaprabha
- Mallika Sukumaran
- Sukumari
- Jose Prakash
- Prema
- Sam
- Sankaradi
- Mancheri Chandran
- Paul Vengola

== Soundtrack ==
The music was composed by M. K. Arjunan and the lyrics were written by Sreekumaran Thampi.

No.	Song	Singers	Lyrics	Length (m:ss)
1	"Engumengum"	Santha RS	Sreekumaran Thampi	
2	"Enikkippol Paadanam"	Chorus, Jolly Abraham, L. R. Anjali	Sreekumaran Thampi	
3	"Kaalam Maarum Kolam"	K. J. Yesudas	Sreekumaran Thampi	
4	"Makara Maasa"	Vani Jairam	Sreekumaran Thampi	
5	"Mangalappaalathan"	P. Jayachandran	Sreekumaran Thampi	
6	"Pidichaal Pulinkombil"	Ambili, Jolly Abraham	Sreekumaran Thampi	
7	"Ragam Thanam Pallavi"	K. J. Yesudas	Sreekumaran Thampi	
8	"Thaarunya Pushpavanathil"	S. Janaki, P. Jayachandran	Sreekumaran Thampi	
