= Chottanikkara Amma =

- Directed by: Crossbelt Mani
- Written by: Nagavally R. S. Kurup
- Screenplay by: Nagavally R. S. Kurup
- Produced by: Thiruvonam Pictures
- Starring: Srividya; Kaviyoor Ponnamma; Adoor Bhasi; Hari
- Cinematography: Thara
- Edited by: N. Gopalakrishnan; Chakrapani
- Music by: R. K. Shekhar
- Production company: Thiruvonam Pictures
- Distributed by: Thiruvonam Pictures
- Release date: 6 August 1976
- Country: India
- Language: Malayalam

Chottanikkara Amma is a 1976 Indian Malayalam film, directed by Crossbelt Mani and produced by Thiruvonam Pictures. The film stars Srividya, Kaviyoor Ponnamma, Adoor Bhasi and Hari in the lead roles. The film's musical score was composed by R. K. Shekhar and lyrics by Bharanikkavu Sivakumar.

== Plot ==
A family of four visits the Chottanikkara Temple in Kerala to get rid of the evil possessing their daughter. They are aided by a humble saint, who provides them shelter and other needs. The saint then narrates the legends associated with how the temple came into existence. Later, they enter the temple, where they witness the Keezhkavu pooja. Chottanikkara Devi battles the evil being and frees their daughter from possession.

== Cast ==
- Srividya as Chottanikkara Devi
- Kaviyoor Ponnamma
- Adoor Bhasi as Pandarapadi Kamadevan
- Hari
- Prema
- Shobha
- Sreelatha Namboothiri as Kamakashi Varassyar/Yakshi
- Vaikom Mani
- Cochin Haneefa as Kannappan
- Nilambur Balan
- Unnimary
- Anandavally
- Balan K. Nair as Vilwamangalam Swamiyar
- Jameela Malik
- Kedamangalam Ali
- Kuthiravattam Pappu
- Master Sekhar
- Meena
- Nellikode Bhaskaran
- Rajakokila
- Ravi Menon
- Ravikumar
- Vanchiyoor Madhavan Nair
- Vettoor Purushan
- Vincent

== Soundtrack ==
The music was composed by R. K. Shekhar when he was in bed for treatment, and he died leaving the project incomplete. Later on, his close friend and prominent musician, M.K. Arjunan completed the project by arranging and recording the songs that Shekhar composed.

No.	Song	Singers	Lyrics	Length (m:ss)
1	"Aadiparaashakthi"	P. Jayachandran, Chorus	Bharanikkavu Sivakumar	
2	"Aadiparaashakthi"	Jayashree	Bharanikkavu Sivakumar	
3	"Chottanikkara Bhagavathi"	K. J. Yesudas	Bharanikkavu Sivakumar	
4	"Jaya Jagadeesa" (Bit)		Bharanikkavu Sivakumar	
5	"Kanakakundala Manditha"	K. J. Yesudas	Bharanikkavu Sivakumar	
6	"Maanikya Veena" (Bit)	Venu Nagavally	Bharanikkavu Sivakumar	
7	"Manassu Manassinte"	K. J. Yesudas, P. Susheela	Bharanikkavu Sivakumar	
8	"Panchami Chandrikayil"	Vani Jairam, Ambili, Jayashree	Bharanikkavu Sivakumar	
9	"Pullipasuvinte Kunje"	Ambili	Bharanikkavu Sivakumar	
10	"Rathidevi Ezhunnallunnoo"	K. P. Brahmanandan	Bharanikkavu Sivakumar	
11	"Shaarada Chandraanane"	K. P. Brahmanandan	Bharanikkavu Sivakumar	
12	"Vande Maatharam" (Bit)	K. J. Yesudas	Bharanikkavu Sivakumar	
