= Hello Darling (1975 film) =

- Directed by: A. B. Raj
- Written by: V. P. Sarathy; M. R. Joseph (dialogues)
- Screenplay by: V. P. Sarathy
- Produced by: R. S. Sreenivasan
- Starring: Prem Nazir; Jayabharathi; Adoor Bhasi; Sankaradi; Sudheer; Bahadoor; Rani Chandra
- Cinematography: P. B. Mani
- Edited by: B. S. Mani
- Music by: M. K. Arjunan
- Production company: Sree Sai Productions
- Distributed by: Sree Sai Productions
- Release date: 7 May 1975
- Country: India
- Language: Malayalam

Hello Darling is a 1975 Indian Malayalam film, directed by A. B. Raj and produced by R. S. Sreenivasan. The film stars Prem Nazir, Jayabharathi, Sudheer, Bahadoor, Adoor Bhasi and Sankaradi in the lead roles. The film has musical score by M. K. Arjunan.

== Cast ==
- Prem Nazir as Venu
- Jayabharathi as Syamala
- Sudheer as Rajesh
- Bahadoor as Appukuttan
- Adoor Bhasi as Padmarajan
- Sankaradi as Pachu Pilla
- Mallika Sukumaran as Leela
- Meena as Kochunarayani
- Rani Chandra as sumithra
- Sreelatha Namboothiri as Latha
- Jagathy Sreekumar as Vijayan
- Alummoodan as Harshan Pilla
- Manavalan Joseph as Mahadevan
- Jose Prakash as Krishna Kumar
- Paravoor Bharathan as Sekhar
- Khadeeja as Kamalabhai
- Prathapachandran as Police officer

== Soundtrack ==
The music was composed by M. K. Arjunan and the lyrics were written by Vayalar.

No.	Song	Singers	Lyrics	Length (m:ss)
1	"Anuraagame Anuraagame"	K. J. Yesudas	Vayalar	
2	"Bahar Se Koy"	K. P. Brahmanandan, Sreelatha Namboothiri	Vayalar	
3	"Dwaarake"	P. Susheela	Vayalar	
4	"Kaattin Chilamboliyo"	K. J. Yesudas	Vayalar	
5	"Nineteen Seventy Five"	P. Madhuri	Vayalar	
6	"Nineteen Seventy Five"	K. J. Yesudas	Vayalar	
