= Aasramam =

1978 film

- Directed by: K. K. Chandran
- Written by: K. K. Chandran
- Screenplay by: K. K. Chandran
- Starring: Dr. Mohandas; K. P. Ummer; Reena
- Cinematography: N. Karthikeyan
- Edited by: Ravi
- Music by: M. K. Arjunan
- Production company: Manvila Films
- Distributed by: Manvila Films
- Release date: 19 May 1978
- Country: India
- Language: Malayalam

Aasramam is a 1978 Indian Malayalam film, directed by K. K. Chandran. The film stars Dr. Mohandas, K. P. Ummer and Reena in the lead roles. The film has musical score by M. K. Arjunan.

== Cast ==
- Dr. Mohandas
- K. P. Ummer
- Reena

== Soundtrack ==
The music was composed by M. K. Arjunan and the lyrics were written by Chunakkara Ramankutty.

No.	Song	Singers	Lyrics	Length (m:ss)
1	"Apsara Kanyake"	P. Jayachandran	Chunakkara Ramankutty	
2	"Ashtamudikkayaru"	Ravi Prasad	Chunakkara Ramankutty	
