= Mallika Sukumaran =

Indian actress (born 1954)

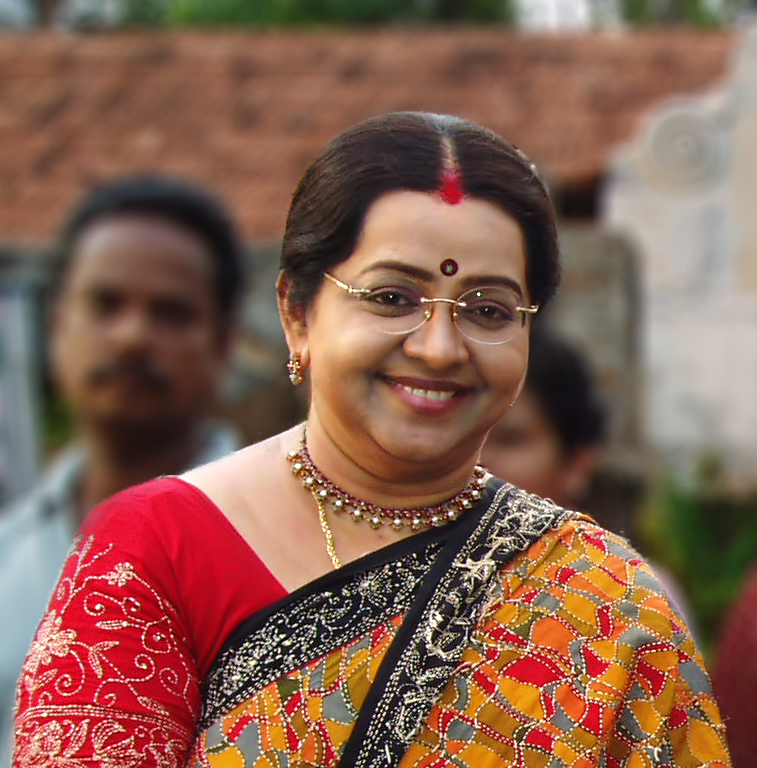
- Born: Mohamallika Pillai; 4 November 1954 (age 71); Haripad, Quilon, State of Travancore–Cochin, India
- Occupations: Actress; businesswoman; dubbing artist
- Years active: 1974–present
- Spouse: Jagathy Sreekumar (m. 1974; div. 1976) Sukumaran (m. 1978; died 1997)
- Children: Indrajith Sukumaran; Prithviraj Sukumaran
- Relatives: Kainikkara Padmanabha Pillai (uncle); Kainikkara Kumara Pillai (uncle); Poornima Indrajith (daughter-in-law); Prarthana Indrajith (granddaughter); Supriya Menon (daughter-in-law)

Mohamallika Pillai (born 4 November 1954), better known as Mallika Sukumaran, is an Indian actress and businesswoman, known for her work in Malayalam cinema. She debuted in 1974 with the Malayalam film Utharayanam by G. Aravindan. She won the Kerala State Film Award for Second Best Actress for her role in the 1974 film Swapnadanam.

Mallika's first appearance on television was in a tele-serial by K. K. Rajeev called Peythozhiyathe. She won the Second Best Actress Award in the Kaveri Film Critics Television Awards (2004) for her role in the serial American Dreams. She is well known for playing both comedic and character roles. She made her debut in Tamil cinema with the 2008 film Vaazhthugal. Mallika has also acted in some advertisements and participated in some talk shows and game shows. She ran a restaurant in Doha.

== Early life and family ==
She was born as Mohamallika Pillai to Kainikkara Madhavan Pillai and Shobha as youngest among four children. Her father was a Gandhian and political activist, and was the younger brother of Kainikkara Padmanabha Pillai and Kainikkara Kumara Pillai. She has an elder brother, M. Velayudhan Pillai and two elder sisters, Premachandrika and Ragalathika. She had her primary education from Government Higher Secondary School for Girls, Cotton Hill. She pursued a bachelor's degree in chemistry from Government College for Women, Thiruvananthapuram.

=== Family tree ===
Jagathy Sreekumar	Mallika Sukumaran
Indrajith Sukumaran	Poornima Indrajith
Prarthana Indrajith	Nakshatra Indrajith

Sukumaran
Prithviraj Sukumaran	Supriya Menon
Alankritha Menon Prithviraj

== Film career ==
Mallika made her acting debut in 1974 with the Malayalam film Utharayanam directed by G. Aravindan and written by Thikkodiyan. She played the role of Radha. In the same year, she won the Kerala State Film Award for Second Best Actress for her role of Rosy Cherian in Swapnadanam. Later on, she was known for her antagonistic and comedic roles. In 1975, she acted in the film Boy Friend and later in Pichathikutappan (1979), directed by P. Venu. When she married the Malayalam actor Sukumaran, she left her acting career. She sang the song "Ormayundo" in P. P. Govindan's 1977 film Saritha, along with P. Jayachandran.

After a break, she returned to acting with the television serial Peythozhiyathe directed by K. K. Rajeev. Her future daughter-in-law Poornima Indrajith was also part of the cast, it was during its sets that her son Indrajith Sukumaran and Poornima met. Valayam, Snehadooram, Sthree Oru Santhwanam, Harichandhanam, American Dreams, Indhumukhi Chandhramathi and Porutham are some of her popular tele-serials. She also got a film-TV critics award for her role in the serial American Dreams.

Her first movie in her comeback is the Rajasenan movie Meghasandesham. Suresh Gopi was the hero of this movie. Her role in Ranjith's Ammakkilikkoodu was widely appreciated. Recently she has judged the popular reality show Amma Ammmayiyamma, telecasting on Kairali TV. She has acted in some advertisements also.

Her debut Tamil film was Vaazhthugal directed by Seeman. In 2016, she won the lifetime achievement award, Chalachithra Prathibha Award, by the Kerala Film Critics Association Award.

== Personal life ==
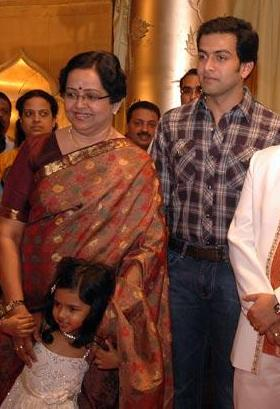
Mallika with her son Prithviraj Sukumaran and granddaughter Prarthana Indrajith at an event in 2009

After romancing for 10 years, she married then struggling actor Jagathy Sreekumar in 1976, eloping with him to Madras without the consent of her family. Mallika's family was against her decision. However, the couple legally separated in 1979. On 17 October 1978, she married Malayalam actor Sukumaran. After her second marriage, she retired from acting. Her sons Prithviraj Sukumaran and Indrajith Sukumaran are leading actors in Malayalam cinema. Actress and television anchor Poornima Indrajith is her daughter-in-law.

In 2012, she opened a beauty and skin clinic in Doha, along with her friend. She holds a residence permit in Doha. In 2013, she launched Spice Boat, a multicuisine restaurant at West Bay, Doha. She is the CEO and the Executive Chairperson of the restaurant. By 2016, the restaurant opened six more outlets around Doha. She has a villa in Doha. She has a house in her hometown of Thiruvananthapuram where she grew up. Her sons are settled in Kochi.

== Filmography ==
=== Films ===
==== 1960s ====
List of Mallika Sukumaran 1960s film credits
Year	Title	Role	Notes
1968	Karthika	Devaki	

==== 1970s ====
List of Mallika Sukumaran 1970s film credits
Year	Title	Role	Notes
1974	Kanyakumari	Tourist	
1974	Vrindavanam		
1974	Durga		
1974	Karthikavilakku		
1974	Nadeenadanmare Avasyamundu		
1975	Boy Friend	Married, mother of 3, fosters another	
1975	Raagam	Blind school teacher	
1975	Makkal	Patreesha	
1975	Thaamarathoni		
1975	Omanakkunju	Kalyani	
1975	Pennpada	Ammukutty	
1975	Hello Darling	Leela	
1975	Kottaaram Vilkkaanundu		
1975	Priyamulla Sophia		
1975	Uttarayanam	Radha	
1975	Love Letter		
1975	Abhimaanam	Thankam	
1976	Anubhavam	Eali	
1976	Mohiniyaattam	Ranjini	
1976	Swapnadanam	Rosy Cheriyan	
1976	Chirikkudukka	Appakari Mariya	
1976	Light House	Mallika	
1976	Vazhivilakku	Sudha	
1976	Priyamvada		
1976	Njavalppazhangal		
1976	Sindooram		
1977	Vidarunna Mottukal	School teacher	
1977	Poojakkedukkatha Pookkal	Gomathi	
1977	Jagadguru Aadisankaran	Saraswati	
1977	Aval Oru Devaalayam	Annie	
1977	Sreedevi	Valsala	
1977	Yudhakandam	College girl	
1977	Sneham		
1977	Kaavilamma		
1977	Sujatha	Kunjamma	
1977	Ashtamangalyam	Shosha	
1977	Agninakshathram		
1977	Madhura Swapanam		
1977	Harshabashpam		
1977	Sreemad Bhagavad Geetha		
1977	Sooryakanthi		
1977	Vezhambal		
1977	Nizhale Nee Sakshi		
1977	Chakravarthini		
1978	Aanappaachan	Girly	
1978	Premashilpi	Bindu's mother	
1978	Kaathirunna Nimisham	Savithri	
1978	Jayikkaanaay Janichavan	Rani	
1978	Madanolsavam	Rajasekharan Thampi's wife	
1978	Kudumbam Namukku Sreekovil	Sumithra	
1978	Aval Viswasthayayirunnu	Lisy	
1978	Etho Oru Swapnam	Vijayamma	
1978	Avalude Ravukal	Raji's mother	
1978	Mannu	Naani	
1978	Samayamaayilla Polum	Mayavathi	
1978	Vayanadan Thamban	Beeyathu	
1978	Padakuthira		
1978	Uthrada Rathri		
1978	Ashtamudikkaayal		
1978	Mattoru Karnan		
1978	Vyaamoham		
1978	Onappudava		
1979	Mochanam	Karthyayani	
1979	Maalika Paniyunnavar	Meenakshi	
1979	Raathrikal Ninakku Vendi		
1979	Hridayathil Nee Mathram		
1979	Hridhayathinte Nirangal		
1979	Pichathy Kuttappan		

==== 1980s ====
List of Mallika Sukumaran 1980s film credits
Year	Title	Role	Notes
1980	Daaliya Pookkal		
1981	Thrishna	Kannamma	
1984	Pyasa Shaitan	Nabeesa	Hindi Dubbed of Vayanadan Thamban
1985	Makan Ente Makan		
1985	Chillu Kottaram		

==== 2000s ====
List of Mallika Sukumaran 2000s film credits
Year	Title	Role	Notes
2001	Megasandesam	College Professor	
2003	Sthithi	Shakunthala Nair	
2003	Ammakilikkoodu	Saramma	
2006	Vrindavanam		
2007	Romeoo	Lakshmikutty	
2007	Chota Mumbai	Roseley	
2008	Vaazhthugal	Kadhiravan's mother	Tamil film
2008	Thirakkatha	Sarojam	
2009	Calendar	Annamma	
2009	Ivar Vivahitharayal	Treesa's mother	

==== 2010s ====
List of Mallika Sukumaran 2010s film credits
Year	Title	Role	Notes
2010	Jayan, the Man behind the Legend	Herself	Documentary
2010	Ammanilavu		
2011	PSC Balan		
2012	Njanum Ente Familiyum	Jaininte	
2015	Oru Yathrayude Anthyam	Arjun's mother	
2015	Rockstar	Alice	
2018	Kuttanadan Marpappa	Peter's mother	
2018	Panchavarnathatha	Kalesh's mother (Sreelatha)	
2018	Ennaalum Sarath..?	Dr. Sam's mother	
2019	My Great Grandfather	Michael's mother (Mary)	
2019	Marconi Mathai	Renu	
2019	Love Action Drama	Dinesh's mother - Lalitha	
2019	Thrissur Pooram	Adv. Rajalakshmi (Vakkeelamma)	

==== 2020s ====
Year	Title	Role	Notes
2021	Sara's	Reethamma	
2022	Bro Daddy	John's Ammachi	Released on Hotstar
2022	Bahumanichu Poyoramma	Saraswathi Amma	Short film
2022	Mahaveeryar	Kaladevi	
2022	Gold	Joshi's mother	
2023	Thalla	Major Sara Mathews	Short film
2023	Santhosham	Leelammachi	
2023	Kunjamminis Hospital	Reetha Uthup Paalamattom (Ammamachi)	
2023	Queen Elizabeth	Gracy	
2024	Jamalinte Punjiri	Judge	
2024	Bad Boyz	Annie Teacher	
2024	Njan Kandatha Sare		
2025	Vyasanasametham Bandhumithradhikal	Savithri Amma	
2025	Nancy Rani	Yamuna	
2025	Cake Story		
2025	Valsala Club	Achamma	
2026	Prakambanam	Rukmini "Chembothamma"	

Albums as an actress

- 2020 : Ammakkorummma as Herself
- 2022 : Thanal Thedi as Amma

As assistant director

- Madanolsavam
- Kanyakumari
- 2 Sreekumaran Thampi's movies

As production controller

- Irakal
- Padayani

=== Playback singing ===
- Saritha (1977) - Ormayundo
- My Great Grandfather (2019) - Grandpa

=== As dubbing artist ===
- Adavukal Pahinettu (1978) for Seema
- Avalude Ravukal (1978) for Seema
- Vanisri's other language dubbing movies
- Hema Choudhary's other language dubbing movies
- Kalpana other language dubbing movies
- Tamaar Padaar (2014) as Vanitha; Pouran's mother (Voice only)
- 12th Man (2022) as Zakariah's mother (Voice only)
- Kaduva (2022) for Seema
- Alone (2023) as Neighbourhood aunty of Kalidas
- Gaganachari (2024) as voice of Alien Aliyamma

== Television ==
• All the programs are television serials, unless otherwise mentioned.

List of Mallika Sukumaran television credits
Year	Title	Channel	Notes
2001	Peythoriyathe	Surya TV	as Mrinalini
2001	Porutham	Surya TV	
2001-2004	Valayam	DD Malayalam	as Kanaka
2001	Thaali	Surya TV	
2002	Snehatheeram	DD Malayalam	
2002	Innale	Asianet	
2002	Sneha	Asianet	Producer
2002	American Dreams	Asianet	as Sara
2002-2003	Snehadooram	Asianet	
	Maaya	Kairali TV	
2004	Sthree Oru Santhwanam	Asianet	as Sethulakshmi
2004	Akkare Akkare	Surya TV	
2004-2005	Life is Beautiful	Asianet	
2005	Athira X C	Amrita TV	as Principal Telefilm
2005-2006	Summer in America	Kairali TV	as Reetha
2005-2006	Indhumukhi Chandramathi	Surya TV	as Chandramathi; Dubbed into Tamil in the same name
2006	Sathi Leelavathi	Amrita TV	as Maria
2007	Veendum Chila Veettu Visheshangal	Asianet	as Malathy
2008	Koottukudumbam	Kairali TV	as Shailaja
2008-2009	Enkilum Ente Gopalakrishna	Asianet	as Gomathiyamma
2009	Rahasyam	Asianet	
2010-2012	Harichandanam	Asianet	as Draupathi
2012-2013	Amma Ammayiyamma	Kairali TV	Judge
2013	Amma Ammayiyamma 2	Kairali TV	Judge
2014	Kudumbapuranam	Jaihind TV	
2015-2016	Indumukhi Chandramathi 2	Surya TV	Sequel to Indumukhi Chandramthi as Chandramathi
2017	Comedy stars season 2	Asianet	Judge
2017	Salt N Pepper	Kaumudy TV	Celebrity presenter
2019	Thakarppan Comedy	Mazhavil Manorama	Judge
2019 – 2020	Kabani	Zee Keralam	as Kottaramuttam Parvathyamma
2020	Koodathayi	Flowers TV	as Achamma Mathew
2020–2021	Life is beautiful season 2	Asianet	as Vinodhini
2021	Parayam Nedam	Amrita TV	as Participant
2021	Ente Maathavu	Surya TV	as Molly
2022–present	Oru Chiri Iru Chiri Bumper Chiri	Mazhavil Manorama	Judge (Recurring)
2022	MY G Flowers Oru Kodi	Flowers TV	as Participant
2022	Red Carpet	Amrita TV	as Mentor
2022–2023	Surabhiyum Suhasiniyum	Flowers TV	as Suhasini
2023	Comedy Masters	Amrita TV	as Judge
2023	Aniyathipraavu (TV series)	Surya TV	Herself; Guest appearance
2023	Entamma Superaa	Mazhavil Manorama	Grand finale jury
2024-2025	Surabhiyum Suhasiniyum 2	Flowers TV	as Suhasini
2025-2026	Happy Couples	Asianet	as Susan
2026–present	Ivar Vivahitharayal	Asianet	as Soubhagya Das
