= Priye Ninakku Vendi =

- Directed by: Mallikarjuna Rao
- Written by: K. S. Gopalakrishnan; Dhanapalan; M. R. Joseph (dialogues)
- Screenplay by: M. R. Joseph
- Produced by: V. Prabhakara Rao
- Starring: Jayabharathi; Sukumaran; Sudheer; Vincent
- Cinematography: Vipin Das
- Edited by: M. S. Mani
- Music by: R. K. Shekhar
- Production company: Modern Art Movies
- Distributed by: Modern Art Movies
- Release date: 12 December 1975
- Country: India
- Language: Malayalam

Priye Ninakku Vendi is a 1975 Indian Malayalam film, directed by Mallikarjuna Rao and produced by V. Prabhakara Rao. The film stars Jayabharathi, Sukumaran, Sudheer and Vincent in the lead roles. The film has musical score by R. K. Shekhar.

== Cast ==
- Jayabharathi
- Sukumaran
- Sudheer
- Vincent
- KPAC Lalitha
- Jose Prakash
- Prema
- Kuthiravattam Pappu

== Soundtrack ==
The music was composed by R. K. Shekhar and the lyrics were written by Vayalar and Bharanikkavu Sivakumar.

No.	Song	Singers	Lyrics	Length (m:ss)
1	"Kadaakshamuna"	K. J. Yesudas, B. Vasantha	Vayalar	
2	"Kayarooriya"		Bharanikkavu Sivakumar	
3	"Maaridameeran Thukil"	P. Susheela	Bharanikkavu Sivakumar	
4	"Njan Niranja Madhupaathram"	Vani Jairam	Bharanikkavu Sivakumar	
5	"Swapnaadanam"	K. J. Yesudas	Vayalar	
