= Sooryavamsham (film) =

- Directed by: A. B. Raj
- Written by: Das; S. L. Puram Sadanandan (dialogues)
- Screenplay by: S. L. Puram Sadanandan
- Produced by: Das; Joy
- Starring: Prem Nazir; Jayabharathi; Adoor Bhasi; Jose Prakash
- Cinematography: T. N. Krishnankutty Nair
- Music by: M. K. Arjunan
- Production company: Priyadarsini Movies
- Distributed by: Priyadarsini Movies
- Release date: 5 September 1975
- Country: India
- Language: Malayalam

Sooryavamsham is a 1975 Indian Malayalam film directed by A. B. Raj and produced by Dos and Joy. The film stars Prem Nazir, Jayabharathi, Adoor Bhasi and Jose Prakash in the lead roles. The film has musical score by M. K. Arjunan.

== Cast ==
- Prem Nazir
- Jayabharathi
- Adoor Bhasi
- Jose Prakash
- T. R. Omana
- Baby Sumathi
- Bahadoor
- Bheeman Raghu
- Rajakokila

== Soundtrack ==
The music was composed by M. K. Arjunan and the lyrics were written by Vayalar.

No.	Song	Singers	Lyrics	Length (m:ss)
1	"Erinjaal Kollunna"	S. Janaki	Vayalar	
2	"Mallesaayaka"	P. Susheela	Vayalar	
3	"Mayilppeelikkannile Kalayevide"	P. Jayachandran	Vayalar	
4	"Prapanjathinu Youvanam"	K. J. Yesudas	Vayalar	
5	"Raajappainkili"	Ambili	Vayalar	
