= Kedamangalam Ali =

Indian actor

- Occupation: Film actor
- Years active: 1961-1983

Kedamangalam Ali was an Indian actor in Malayalam movies during the 1960s and 1970s. He was born in 1932 in Kedamangalam near North Paravur in Ernakulam District, Kerala. Ali's popular movies are Mudiyanaaya Puthran (1961), Ninamaninja Kaalppaadukal (1963), Moodupadam (1963), Ammaye Kaanaan (1963) and Bhargaveenilayam (1964). He died on 26 April 1986.

== Partial filmography ==
- Mudiyanaya Puthran (1961)
- Ninamaninja Kalpadukal (1963)
- Moodupadam (1963)
- Ammaye Kaanaan (1963)
- Thacholi Othenan (1964)... Kaduvancheri Yamman Kidavu
- Bhargavi Nilayam (1964)
- Aadyakiranangal (1964)
- Kochumon (1965)
- Chemmeen (1965)
- Ammu (1965)
- NGO (1967)
- Aval (1967)
- Ezhu Rathrikal (1968)
- Mooladhanam (1969)
- Nadhi (1969)
- Thriveni (1970)
- Nizhalattam (1970)
- Anadha Shilpangal (1971)
- Poompatta (1971)
- Oru Penninte Katha (1971)
- Karakanakadal (1971)
- Aabhijathyam (1971)
- Kandavarundo (1972)
- Manassu (1973)
- Chenda (1973)
- Maram (1973)
- Thulabharam (1973)
- Nellu (1974)
- Pathiravum Pakalvelichavum (1974)
- Vrindaavanam (1974)
- Thomasleeha (1975)
- Abhimaanam (1975)
- Chottanikkara Amma (1976)
- Vanadevatha (1976)
- Dweepu (1977)
- Varadakshina (1977)
- Aanandam Paramanandam (1977)
- Ormakal Marikkumo (1977)
- Enne Njan Thedunnu (1983)
