= Pennpada =

- Directed by: Crossbelt Mani
- Written by: M. K. Nathan; Jagathy N. K. Achari (dialogues)
- Screenplay by: Jagathy N. K. Achari
- Produced by: C. P. Sreedharan; P. Appu Nair; K. V. Nair
- Starring: Rajakokila; Reena; Vijayalalitha; Vincent
- Cinematography: N. A. Thara
- Edited by: Chakrapani
- Music by: R. K. Shekhar
- Production company: United Movies
- Distributed by: United Movies
- Release date: 30 May 1975
- Country: India
- Language: Malayalam

Pennpada is a 1975 Indian Malayalam-language film, directed by Crossbelt Mani and produced by C. P. Sreedharan, P. Appu Nair and K. V. Nair. The film stars Rajakokila, Reena, Vijayalalitha and Vincent. The film's score is composed by R. K. Shekhar.

== Cast ==
- Rajakokila as Radha
- Reena as Latha
- Vijayalalitha as Sreedevi / Geetha
- K. P. Ummer as Raghavan
- Vincent as Venu
- Sudheer as Chandran
- Adoor Bhasi as Bhaskara Pillai
- Bahadoor as Vasu
- Sreelatha Namboothiri as Gourikkutty
- Alummoodan as Kunjiraman
- Janardanan as Panicker
- KPAC Sunny as Ramdas
- Kuthiravattam Pappu as Janaki (Transvestite)
- Mallika Sukumaran as Ammukkutty
- Meena as Meenakshi Chechi
- N. Govindankutty as Kolla Sangha Thalavan
- Nellikode Bhaskaran as Gurukkal
- T. P. Madhavan as DSP

== Soundtrack ==
The music was composed by R. K. Shekhar. The song "Vellithen Kinnam" is often claimed to be composed to his son Dileep (later known as A. R. Rahman), but singer Jayachandran confirmed this was not true.

No.	Song	Singers	Lyrics	Length (m:ss)
1	"Maanam Palunku"	K. J. Yesudas	Vayalar	
2	"Nokku Theriyumoda"	K. P. Brahmanandan, Manoharan	Bharanikkavu Sivakumar	
3	"Thencholakkili"	K. J. Yesudas	Vayalar	
4	"Vellithen Kinnam"	P. Jayachandran	Bharanikkavu Sivakumar	
