= Kuttichaathan (film) =

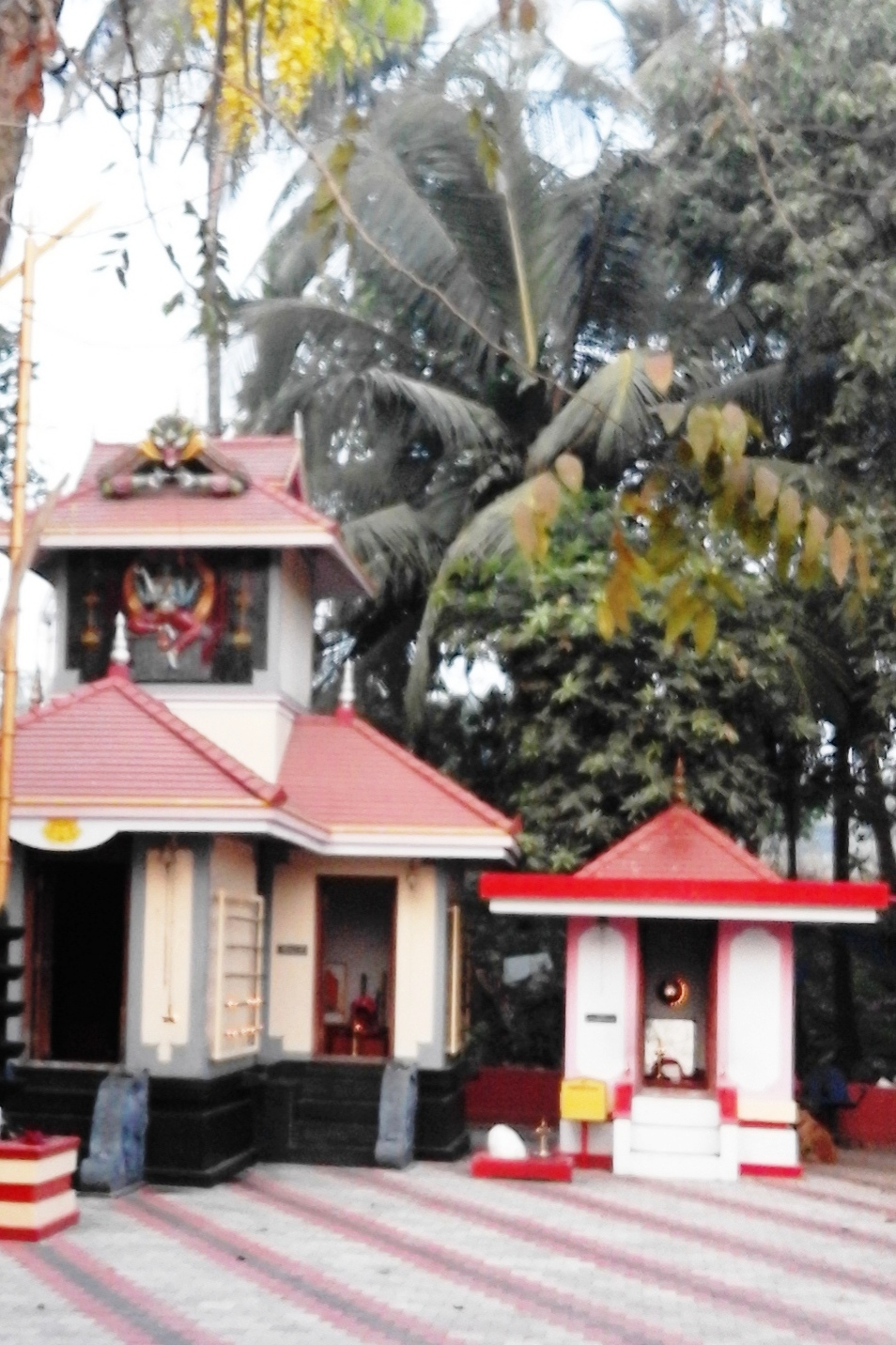
- Directed by: Crossbelt Mani
- Written by: M. P. Narayana Pillai; Kakkanadan (dialogues)
- Screenplay by: Kakkanadan
- Starring: KP Ummer; Vidhubala; Bahadoor; Vincent
- Cinematography: N. A. Thara
- Edited by: Chakrapani
- Music by: R. K. Shekhar
- Production company: Rajpriya Pictures
- Distributed by: Rajpriya Pictures
- Release date: 25 December 1975
- Country: India
- Language: Malayalam

Kuttichaathan is a 1975 Indian Malayalam film, directed by Crossbelt Mani. The film stars KP Ummer, Vidhubala, Bahadoor and Vincent in the lead roles. The film has musical score by R. K. Shekhar.

== Cast ==
- K. P. Ummer
- Vidhubala
- Vincent
- Bahadoor
- Rajakokila
- Adoor Bhasi
- Sreelatha Namboothiri
- Kuthiravattam Pappu
- Meena

== Soundtrack ==
The music was composed by R. K. Shekhar and the lyrics were written by Vayalar and Bharanikkavu Sivakumar.

No.	Song	Singers	Lyrics	Length (m:ss)
1	"Ippozho Sukhamappozho"	K. J. Yesudas	Vayalar	
2	"Kaaveri Kaaveri"	S. Janaki	Vayalar	
3	"Omkaali Mahaakali"	K. P. Brahmanandan	Vayalar	
4	"Raagangal Bhavangal"	K. J. Yesudas, P. Susheela	Bharanikkavu Sivakumar	
