= Ajnaatha Theerangal =

1979 film

- Directed by: M. Krishnan Nair
- Written by: Mani Muhammed
- Screenplay by: Mani Muhammed
- Produced by: S. Kumar
- Starring: Raghavan; Sulochana; Vidhubala; Sathaar
- Cinematography: N. A. Thara
- Edited by: M. N. Sankar
- Music by: M. K. Arjunan
- Production company: Sastha Productions
- Distributed by: Sastha Productions
- Release date: 3 May 1979
- Country: India
- Language: Malayalam

Ajnaatha Theerangal is a 1979 Indian Malayalam film, directed by M. Krishnan Nair and produced by S. Kumar. The film stars Vidhubala, Raghavan and Sathaar in the lead roles. The film has musical score by M. K. Arjunan.

== Cast ==
- Raghavan as Ravi
- Ambika as Geetha
- Vidhubala as Kavitha
- Sathaar as Surendran/Umesh
- Ravikumar as Mohan
- Reena as Urmila
- Sreelatha Namboothiri as Leela
- Sulochana as Manjula
- Thikkurussy Sukumaran Nair as Justice Sankara Menon
- Sukumari as Kalyana P Nair
- Bahadoor as Parameswaran Nair
- Hari as Johnson

== Soundtrack ==
The music was composed by M. K. Arjunan and the lyrics were written by Sreekumaran Thampi.

No.	Song	Singers	Lyrics	Length (m:ss)
1	"Jalatharangam"	K. J. Yesudas, Ambili	Sreekumaran Thampi	
2	"Oro Raathriyum Madhuvidhu"	Vani Jairam	Sreekumaran Thampi	
3	"Oru Poovinenthu Sugandham"	K. J. Yesudas, Vani Jairam	Sreekumaran Thampi	
4	"Panchavadiyile"	K. J. Yesudas	Sreekumaran Thampi	
5	"Varumo Nee"	P. Susheela	Sreekumaran Thampi	
6	"Vasantha Radhathil"	Vani Jairam	Sreekumaran Thampi	
