= Yudhabhoomi =

- Directed by: Crossbelt Mani
- Written by: Kakkanadan
- Screenplay by: Kakkanadan
- Produced by: Thiruvonam Pictures
- Starring: KP Ummer; Vidhubala; Vincent; Bahadoor
- Cinematography: N. A. Thara
- Edited by: Chakrapani
- Music by: R. K. Shekhar
- Production company: Thiruvonam Pictures
- Distributed by: Thiruvonam Pictures
- Release date: 27 February 1976
- Country: India
- Language: Malayalam

Yudhabhoomi is a 1976 Indian Malayalam film, directed by Crossbelt Mani and produced by Thiruvonam Pictures. The film stars KP Ummer, Vidhubala, Cochin Haneefa and Bahadoor in the lead roles. The film has musical score by R. K. Shekhar.

== Cast ==
- K. P. Ummer
- Vidhubala
- Vincent
- Rajakokila
- Ravi Menon
- Bahadoor
- Adoor Bhasi
- Sreelatha Namboothiri
- Cochin Haneefa
- Balan K. Nair
- Kuthiravattam Pappu
- Meena
- Reena
- Vettoor Purushan

== Soundtrack ==
The music was composed by R. K. Shekhar and the lyrics were written by Mankombu Gopalakrishnan and Bharanikkavu Sivakumar.

No.	Song	Singers	Lyrics	Length (m:ss)
1	"Aashaadha Maasam"	Vani Jairam	Mankombu Gopalakrishnan	
2	"Aruvi Paalaruvi"	P. Jayachandran	Mankombu Gopalakrishnan	
3	"Kaamante Kodiyude Adayaalam"	K. P. Brahmanandan	Mankombu Gopalakrishnan	
4	"Lovelyppenne"	P. Jayachandran, K. P. Brahmanandan	Bharanikkavu Sivakumar	
