= Dharmakshetre Kurukshetre =

- Directed by: Kunchacko
- Written by: P. K. Sarangapani
- Screenplay by: P. K. Sarangapani
- Produced by: Kunchacko
- Starring: Prem Nazir; Jayabharathi; Adoor Bhasi; Thikkurissy Sukumaran Nair
- Cinematography: U. Rajagopal
- Music by: M. S. Viswanathan; Kumarakam Rajappan
- Production company: Excel Productions
- Distributed by: Excel Productions
- Release date: 20 August 1975
- Country: India
- Language: Malayalam

Dharmakshetre Kurukshetre is a 1975 Indian Malayalam-language film, directed and produced by Kunchacko. The film stars Prem Nazir, Jayabharathi, Adoor Bhasi and Thikkurissy Sukumaran Nair. The film has musical score by M. S. Viswanathan and Kumarakam Rajappan.

== Cast ==
- Prem Nazir
- Jayabharathi
- Adoor Bhasi
- Thikkurissy Sukumaran Nair
- Prema
- Bahadoor
- M. G. Soman
- Jayan
- Rajakokila
- Vincent

== Soundtrack ==
The music was composed by M. S. Viswanathan and Kumarakam Rajappan and the lyrics were written by Vayalar.

| No. | Song | Singers | Lyrics | Length (m:ss) |
|---|---|---|---|---|
| 1 | "Chanchalitha" | K. J. Yesudas, S. Janaki | Vayalar | |
| 2 | "Chanchalitha" | P. Susheela, Ambili, B. Vasantha | Vayalar | |
| 3 | "Kudaveno Kuda" | Kumarakam Rajappan, Pattanakkad Purushothaman, Lalitha Rajappan | Vayalar | |
| 4 | "Lovely Lilly" | P. Susheela, P. Jayachandran | Vayalar | |
| 5 | "Manassoru Swapnakhani" | K. J. Yesudas, S. Janaki | Vayalar | |
| 6 | "Onnaamtheruvil" | L. R. Eeswari | Vayalar | |
| 7 | "Paanchajanyam" | K. J. Yesudas | Vayalar | |
| 8 | "Swarnamulakal" | M. S. Viswanathan | Vayalar | |
