= Reena (actress) =

Indian actress

- Born: 2 September 1958 (age 68); Kochi, India
- Occupation: Actress
- Years active: 1973–1984; 1994–2009; 2014–Present
- Parent(s): Peter Reskyuna, Jessy

Reena is an Indian actress best known for her work in Malayalam cinema. She was one of the lead actresses during the late 1970s. She has acted in more than 100 films along with several popular television series in Malayalam and Tamil languages. She has also acted in a few Tamil and Telugu movies as well.

== Personal life ==
Reena was born to Peter Rasquinha and Jessy in 1958 at Edappilly, Kochi. Her father was from Mangalore and mother was from Kochi, Kerala. She has a brother, Ivan. She did her primary schooling in Mangalore. She pursued bachelor's degree from Madras Presentation College, Perumbavoor. She remains unmarried. She resides at Chennai with family.

== Career ==
She started her career at 14, in Chukku movie as Sheela's daughter. She started production company, V.I.C and produced movies Druvasankamam, Ente Kadha and Janapriyan. Now she is acting in Tele films and soap operas. Currently she is acting in Ammayariyathe serial in Asianet.

== Partial filmography ==
=== Malayalam ===
==== 1970s ====
| Year | Title | Role | Notes |
|---|---|---|---|
| 1973 | Chukku | | |
| 1974 | Vrindavaanam | | |
| 1974 | Chattakkari | Llin | |
| 1975 | Tourist Bunaglow | | |
| 1975 | Velicham Akale | | |
| 1975 | Chandanachola | | |
| 1975 | Priyamulla Sophia | | |
| 1975 | Chief Guest | | |
| 1975 | Boy Friend | | |
| 1975 | Love Marriage | | |
| 1975 | Love Letter | | |
| 1975 | Penpada | Latha | |
| 1975 | Makkal | Parvathy | |
| 1975 | Pravaham | Ragini | |
| 1976 | Agnipushpam | | |
| 1976 | Rajaankanam | | |
| 1976 | Priyamvadha | | |
| 1976 | Anaavaranam | | |
| 1976 | Kaayamkulam Kochunniyude Makan | Savithrikutty | |
| 1976 | Yudha Bhoomi | | |
| 1976 | Ammini Ammavan | Hema | |
| 1976 | Amritavahini | Thulasi | |
| 1976 | Prasaadam | Meenakshi | |
| 1977 | Aaraadhana | | |
| 1977 | Vezhambal | | |
| 1977 | Rowdy Rajamma | | |
| 1977 | Ivanente Priyaputhran | | |
| 1977 | Varadakshina | | |
| 1977 | Minimol | Rajamma | |
| 1977 | Raajaparampara | | |
| 1977 | Yudhakaandam | Kala | |
| 1977 | Oonjaal | Sharada | |
| 1977 | Nirakudam | Usha | |
| 1978 | Aniyara | | |
| 1978 | Aasramam | | |
| 1978 | Bhrashtu | | |
| 1978 | Vadakakku Oru Hridayam | | |
| 1978 | Praarthana | | |
| 1978 | Hemantharaathri | | |
| 1978 | Snehikkan Samayamilla | | |
| 1978 | Urakkam Varaatha Raathrikal | Malathy | |
| 1978 | Aanappaachan | Usha | |
| 1978 | Thamburatti | Rema, Leela | |
| 1978 | Beena | Betty Fernandez | |
| 1979 | Pathivritha | | |
| 1979 | Indradhanussu | | |
| 1979 | Aayiram Vasanthangal | | |
| 1979 | Pokkattadikkaari | | |
| 1979 | Ajnaatha Theerangal | Urmila | |
| 1979 | Oru Raagam Pala Thaalam | Priya | |
| 1979 | Ezham Kadalinakkare | Latha | |

==== 1980s ====
| Year | Title | Role | Notes |
|---|---|---|---|
| 1980 | Puzha | | |
| 1980 | Pavizhamuthu | Geetha | |
| 1980 | Ithikkarapakki | Sainabha | |
| 1980 | Pralayam | Kusumam | |
| 1980 | Karimbana | Thankamma | |
| 1981 | Poochasanyaasi | Maithili | |
| 1981 | Dhruvasangamam | Valsala | |
| 1981 | Agnisaram | Latha | |
| 1982 | Madrasile Mon | | |
| 1982 | Idiyum Minnalum | | |
| 1982 | Ivan Oru Simham | Omana | |
| 1982 | Thuranna Jail | Mercy | |
| 1982 | Ankuram | Raji | |
| 1983 | Ente Katha | Usha | |
| 1983 | Aadyathe Anuraagam | Sushamma | |
| 1984 | Ulppathi | | |

==== 1990s ====
| Year | Title | Role | Notes |
|---|---|---|---|
| 1994 | Minnaram | Reena | |
| 1995 | Thumboli Kadappuram | Thomichayan's wife | |
| 1996 | Ee Puzhayum Kadannu | Anjali's mother | |
| 1996 | Kumkumacheppu | Nalini | |
| 1996 | Mimics Super 1000 | Arundathi Varma | |
| 1996 | Devaraagam | Doctor | |
| 1996 | Kanjirappally Kuriachan | Valsamma | |
| 1996 | Indraprastham | Doctor | |
| 1996 | Ishtamaanu Nooru Vattam | Prasad's mother | |
| 1997 | Kannur | | |
| 1997 | Junior Mandrake | Sudharma | |
| 1997 | Oru Yathramozhi | Sreeni's wife | |
| 1997 | Varnapakittu | Kuruvilla's wife | |
| 1997 | Aattuvela | Malu's mother | |
| 1997 | Ancharakalyanam | Madhavi | |
| 1997 | Kalyanappittennu | Bhanu | |
| 1997 | Newspaper Boy | Kanakam | |
| 1997 | Guru | Old Queen | |
| 1997 | Kilukil Pambaram | Bhageerathibhai Thamburatti | |
| 1997 | Chandralekha | Shobha | |
| 1998 | Ayal Kadha Ezhuthukayanu | Priyadarshini's mother | |
| 1998 | Harikrishnans | Meera's mother | |
| 1998 | Achaammakkuttiyude Achaayan | Alice | |
| 1998 | Kallu Kondoru Pennu | Suresh's sister | |
| 1998 | Summer in Bethlehem | Abhirami's step mother | |
| 1998 | Punjabi House | Manninder Singh's wife | |
| 1998 | Gloria Fernandes From U.S.A. | Leenamma | |
| 1998 | Manthri Maalikayil Manasammatham | Asha's mother | |
| 1998 | Ilamura Thampuran | Devakikunjamma | |
| 1999 | Gaandhiyan | Divya's mother | |
| 1999 | Vazhunnor | Mable | |
| 1999 | Deepasthambham Mahascharyam | Indu's mother | |
| 1999 | Ezhupunna Tharakan | Leenamma | |
| 1999 | Veendum Chila Veettukaryangal | Beena | |
| 1999 | Pathram | Vasundhara Thampi | |
| 1999 | Crime File | Amala's mother | |
| 1999 | Sparsham | | |

==== 2000s ====
| Year | Title | Role | Notes |
|---|---|---|---|
| 2000 | Dreamz | Roy's sister | |
| 2000 | Narasimham | Anuradha's mother | |
| 2000 | Joker | Padmini | |
| 2000 | Arayannangalude Veedu | Rajan's wife | |
| 2000 | Snehapoorvam Anna | Jomon's mother | |
| 2000 | Life is Beautiful | Suraj's mother | |
| 2000 | Sathyameva Jayathe | Nancy's mother | |
| 2001 | Oru Apoorva Pranayakatha | | |
| 2001 | The Gift of God | | |
| 2001 | Dany | | |
| 2002 | Kunjikoonan | Lakshmi's mother | |
| 2002 | Kalyanaraman | Thampi's relative | |
| 2003 | Ente Ammakku | Anuradha's mother | |
| 2003 | Sadanandante Samayam | Sumangala's mother | |
| 2003 | Sahodaran Sahadevan | Yamuna's mother | |
| 2003 | Pulival Kalyanam | Doctor | |
| 2003 | CID Moosa | Chief Minister's wife | |
| 2004 | Snehapoorvam | | |
| 2004 | Priyam Priyamkaram | Alice's mother | |
| 2004 | Njan Salperu Ramankutty | Sangeetha's mother | |

==== 2010s ====
| Year | Title | Role | Notes |
|---|---|---|---|
| 2010 | Senior Mandrake | | Archive footage |
| 2017 | Fukri | Hajira | |
| 2017 | Clint | Chinnamma's mother | |
| 2018 | Ennaalum Sarath..? | Mother Superior | |

=== Tamil ===
| Year | Title | Role | Notes |
|---|---|---|---|
| 1974 | Aval Oru Thodar Kathai | Sumathi | Credited as Vinothini |
| 1976 | Manmadha Leelai | Anju | |
| 1979 | Ore Vaanam Ore Bhoomi | Latha | |
| 1979 | Thirisoolam | Nalini | |
| 1979 | Imayam | Narmada | |
| 1979 | Vallavan Varugiran | Thara | |
| 1980 | Kuruvikoodu | Radha | |
| 1980 | Swapna | Kalpana | |
| 1980 | Rishi Moolam | Thangam | |
| 1980 | Naan Potta Savaal | Roopa | |
| 1995 | Karuppu Nila | Divya's mother | |
| 1997 | Sishya | Pooja's mother | |
| 2003 | Pudhiya Geethai | Sarathy's Professor | |
| 2006 | Varalaru | Saroja | |
| 2007 | Cheena Thaana 001 | Thamizharasu's mother | |
| 2007 | Ninaithu Ninaithu Parthen | Farzana's mother | |

=== Telugu ===
| Year | Title | Role | Notes |
|---|---|---|---|
| 1978 | Maro Charitra | | Photo only |
| 1980 | Manavudu Mahaneeyudu | | |
| 1981 | Asadyalaku Asadyudu | Thara | |
| 1981 | Swapna | Kalpana | |
| 1983 | Aalaya Sikharam | Bhanu | |
| 1984 | Ethe Naasaval | Roopa | |

=== Kannada ===
1. Swapna (1981)

=== Hindi ===
1. Virasat (1997) as Raja's wife

== Television career ==
| Year | Title | Language | Role | Channel |
|---|---|---|---|---|
| 1995 | Paying Guest | Malayalam | | Doordarshan |
| 2001 | Anna | Malayalam | | Kairali TV |
| 2001 | Gouri | Malayalam | Gouri's mother | Doordarshan |
| 2002 | American Dreams | Malayalam | | Asianet |
| 2002 | Chanchakkam | Malayalam | | |
| 2002 | Bharya | Malayalam | | Asianet |
| 2002 | Mangalyam | Malayalam | | Asianet |
| 2003 | Vasundhara Medicals | Malayalam | | Asianet |
| 2004 | Kaavanjali | Malayalam | | Surya TV |
| 2004 | Kadamattathu Kathanar | Malayalam | Janaki | Asianet |
| 2005–2006 | Summer In America | Malayalam | Neethu | Kairali TV |
| 2005–2007 | Nimmathi | Tamil | | Sun TV |
| 2006–2008 | Lakshmi | Tamil | | Sun TV |
| 2007 | Naanayam | Tamil | Padmavathi | Sun TV |
| 2007–2009 | Vaira Nenjam | Tamil | Vaitheeswari | Kalaignar TV(dubbed as aadajanma on Star Maa and Swarna manasu on Asianet) |
| 2008-2009 | Thirumathi Selvam | Tamil | Dileepan's mother | Sun TV |
| 2014 | Thiru Mangalyam | Tamil | Shobha Vijayakumar | Zee Tamil |
| 2014 | Aniyathi | Malayalam | Prabha | Mazhavil Manorama |
| 2015 | Dhathuputhri | Malayalam | | Mazhavil Manorama |
| 2015 | Eeswaran Sakshiyayi | Malayalam | Bhadra | Flowers TV |
| 2015 | Keladi Kanmani | Tamil | Shantha Kumari (SK) | Sun TV |
| 2016 | Ennu Swantham Jani | Malayalam | | Surya TV |
| 2018–2019 | Vandhal Sridevi | Tamil | Akhila | Colors Tamil |
| 2018–2019 | Thenum Vayambum | Malayalam | Chandramathi | Surya TV |
| 2019 | Run | Tamil | Chandran's mother | Sun TV |
| 2019 | Rasaathi | Tamil | Rasappan's mother | Sun TV |
| 2020 | Koodathayi | Malayalam | Basheer's Umma | Flowers TV |
| 2020–2021 | Ammayariyathe | Malayalam | Sulekha | Asianet |
| 2022–2023 | Rettai Roja | Tamil | | Zee Tamil |
| 2022–2024 | Kanaa | Tamil | | Zee Tamil |
| 2024–2026 | Pavithram | Malayalam | Savithri Amma | Asianet |
| 2026–present | Pavithram 2 | Malayalam | Savithri Amma | JioHotstar |
