= Thaamarathoni =

- Directed by: Crossbelt Mani
- Written by: Dr. Balakrishnan
- Screenplay by: Dr. Balakrishnan
- Starring: Prem Nazir; Jayabharathi; Adoor Bhasi; Bahadoor
- Cinematography: Mani
- Edited by: Chakrapani
- Music by: R. K. Shekhar
- Production company: United Movies
- Distributed by: United Movies
- Release date: 31 January 1975
- Country: India
- Language: Malayalam

Thaamarathoni is a 1975 Indian Malayalam film, directed by Crossbelt Mani. The film stars Prem Nazir, Jayabharathi, Adoor Bhasi and Bahadoor in the lead roles. The film has musical score by R. K. Shekhar.

== Cast ==
- Prem Nazir
- Jayabharathi
- Adoor Bhasi
- Bahadoor
- K. P. Ummer
- Nellikode Bhaskaran
- Philomina
- Rajakokila

== Soundtrack ==
The music was composed by R. K. Shekhar and the lyrics were written by Vayalar.

No.	Song	Singers	Lyrics	Length (m:ss)
1	"Aishwaryadevathe"	K. P. Brahmanandan, Kasthuri Shankar	Vayalar	
2	"Bhasmakkuri Thottu"	P. Madhuri	Vayalar	
3	"Butterfly Oh Butterfly"	K. J. Yesudas	Vayalar	
4	"Ithu Sisiram"	Vani Jairam	Vayalar	
5	"Onnu Pettu Kunju"	Gopalakrishnan, Kasthuri Shankar	Vayalar	
6	"Thudiykkunnathidathu Kanno"	K. J. Yesudas	Vayalar	
