= Pazhassi Raja (1964 film) =

- Kottarakkara Sreedharan Nair as Pazhassi Raja
- Directed by: Kunchako
- Written by: Thikkodiyan
- Produced by: Kunchako
- Starring: Kottarakkara Sreedharan Nair; Prem Nazir; Sathyan; Satyapal; Rajasree; Pankajavalli
- Cinematography: T.N. Krishnankutty Nair
- Music by: R. K. Shekhar
- Production company: Udaya Studios
- Distributed by: Excel Productions
- Release date: 21 August 1964
- Country: India
- Language: Malayalam

Pazhassi Raja is a 1964 Malayalam biographical film, directed and produced by Kunchako. It is written by well known playwright Thikkodiyan and is based on the life of warrior king Kerala Varma Pazhassi Raja. It stars Kottarakkara Sreedharan Nair in the title role, with Prem Nazir, Sathyan, Satyapal, S. P. Pillai, Rajashree and Pankajavalli in other important roles.

Pazhassi Raja is the second historical film in Malayalam, the first one was Veluthamby Dalava (1962) by the same director. Pazhassi Raja was completely filmed from Kunchako's Udaya Studios, which resulted in the lack of technical perfection and eventually lead to the commercial failure of the film. Its music is composed by R. K. Shekhar, who debuted as a music director through this film.

== Cast ==
- Kottarakkara Sreedharan Nair as Kerala Varma Pazhassi Raja
- Prem Nazir as Kannavathu Nambiar
- Sathyan as Baber
- Satyapal as Commandant Wellesley
- Rajasree (Gracy) as Ammu Thampuratty
- Boban as Unni
- Pankajavalli
- Dr. Chandraguptan as Kaitheri Ambu
- Nanukuttan as Sankara Varma
- Sreedevi as Maakkam
- Kottayam Chellappan as Pazhayam Veedan
- Vincent Chacko as Thalakkal Chanthu
- Sankaradi as Unni Moosa
- S. P. Pillai
- Manavalan Joseph
- Nellikkodu Bhaskaran

== Soundtrack ==
The film features an acclaimed musical score and the soundtrack by R. K. Shekhar. It was his debut work, though he has worked in a lot of films as a conductor or as an uncredited music director. The songs became popular upon release and established a bright career for Shekhar. The soundtrack consists of 12 songs with lyrics by Vayalar Ramavarma.

"Chotta Muthal Chudala Vare" (by K. J. Yesudas), "Muthe Vaa Vaavo Muthu Kudame Vaa Vvaavo" (by P. Susheela), "Saayippe Saayippe, Aslam Alaikkum" (by P. Leela and Mehboob), "Kannu Randum Thaamarappoo" (by P. Susheela) and "Paathira Poovukal Vaarmudikettil" (by P. Leela) are considered evergreen hits.

No.	Song	Singers	Lyrics	Length (m:ss)
1	"Anjanakkunnil"	P. Susheela	Vayalar Ramavarma	
2	"Baale Kel Nee"	Alleppey Suthan	Vayalar Ramavarma	
3	"Chirakattuveenoru"	S. Janaki, A. M. Rajah	Vayalar Ramavarma	
4	"Chottamuthal Chudalavare"	K. J. Yesudas	Vayalar Ramavarma	
5	"Jaathee Jaathanukamba"	P. Leela	Vayalar Ramavarma	
6	"Jaya Jaya Bhagavathi Maathangi"	K. J. Yesudas, P. Leela	Vayalar Ramavarma	
7	"Kannu Randum Thaamarappoo"	P. Susheela	Vayalar Ramavarma	
8	"Muthe Vaavaavo"	P. Susheela	Vayalar Ramavarma	
9	"Paathiraappoovukal"	P. Leela	Vayalar Ramavarma	
10	"Panchavadiyil"	S. Janaki	Vayalar Ramavarma	
11	"Saayippe Saayippe"	P. Leela, Mehboob	Vayalar Ramavarma	
12	"Thekku Thekku Thekanaam"	K. J. Yesudas, P. Leela	Vayalar Ramavarma	
13	"Villaalikale"	P. Leela, K. S. George	Vayalar Ramavarma	
