= Thiruvonam (film) =

1975 film by Sreekumaran Thampi

- Poster
- Directed by: Sreekumaran Thampi
- Written by: Sreekumaran Thampi
- Produced by: K. P. Mohanan
- Starring: Prem Nazir; Sharada; Kamal Haasan; Jayasudha
- Cinematography: T. N. Krishnankutty Nair
- Edited by: K. Sankunni
- Music by: Songs: M. K. Arjunan; Background Score: R. K. Shekhar
- Production company: Vandana films
- Distributed by: Vimala Release
- Release date: 2 October 1975
- Country: India
- Language: Malayalam

Thiruvonam is a 1975 Indian Malayalam-language film, directed by Sreekumaran Thampi and produced by K. P. Mohanan. The film stars Prem Nazir, Sharada, Kamal Haasan and Jayasudha. The film has musical score by R. K. Shekhar and songs composed by M. K. Arjunan.

== Cast ==
- Prem Nazir as Babu
- Sharada as Radhika
- Kamal Haasan as Prem Kumar
- Jayasudha as Shandini
- M. G. Soman as Padmakumar
- Sujatha as Sujatha
- Kaviyoor Ponnamma
- Sreelatha Namboothiri as Sandhyarani
- T. S. Muthaiah as Kumar
- Chandraji as Chandiran pillai
- K. P. Ummer as Damotharan
- Adoor Bhasi as Abimanyu
- K. P. A. C. Lalitha as Valsala
- Cochin Haneefa
- Karan(Master Raghu) as Babu, child age.
- Baby Sumathi as Manju
- Philomina as Servant
- Alummoodan
- Jagathy Sreekumar
- Vincent
- Prathapachandran

== Production ==
Thiruvonam film directed by Sreekumaran Thampi, produced by K. P. Mohan under production banner Vandana Films. It was given an "U" (Unrestricted) certificate by the Central Board of Film Certification. The final length of the film was 4,498.48 metres (14,758.8 ft).

== Soundtrack ==
Thiruvonam

Soundtrack album by M. K. Arjunan
- Released: 1975
- Genre: Feature film soundtrack
- Language: Malayalam
- Producer: M. K. Arjunan
External audio
- Official Audio Jukebox on YouTube

The film's soundtrack was composed by M. K. Arjunan; the lyrics were written by Sreekumaran Thampi.

The song "Thiruvonappularithan" is set in the carnatic raga known as Arabhi, the song was well received in Malayalam songs sung by playback singer Vani Jairam, but the video footage of the song is not available at present.

| No. | Title | Singer(s) | Length |
|---|---|---|---|
| 1. | "Aa Thrisandhyathan" | K. J. Yesudas, Choir |
| 2. | "Ethra Sundari" | K. J. Yesudas |
| 3. | "Kaattinte Vanchiyilu" | K. J. Yesudas |
| 4. | "Pachanellin Kathiru" | P. Jayachandran, P. Madhuri |
| 5. | "Thaaram Thudichu" | P. Jayachandran |
| 6. | "Thiruvonappularithan" | Vani Jairam |
