= Velicham Akale =

- Directed by: Crossbelt Mani
- Written by: Kakkanadan
- Screenplay by: Kakkanadan
- Produced by: S. Parameswaran
- Starring: Sreelatha Namboothiri; Cochin Haneefa; Bahadoor; K. P. Ummer
- Cinematography: N. A. Thara
- Edited by: Chakrapani
- Music by: R. K. Shekhar
- Production company: Rajapriya
- Distributed by: Rajapriya
- Release date: 12 September 1975
- Country: India
- Language: Malayalam

Velicham Akale is a 1975 Indian Malayalam film, directed by Crossbelt Mani and produced by S. Parameswaran. The film stars Sreelatha Namboothiri, Cochin Haneefa, Bahadoor and K. P. Ummer in the lead roles. The film has musical score by R. K. Shekhar.

== Cast ==
- Sreelatha Namboothiri
- Cochin Haneefa
- Bahadoor
- K. P. Ummer
- KPAC Sunny
- Rajakokila
- Ravi Menon
- Reena
- Surasu
- Vincent

== Soundtrack ==
The music was composed by R. K. Shekhar and the lyrics were written by Vayalar.

No.	Song	Singers	Lyrics	Length (m:ss)
1	"Enikku Daahikkunnu"	P. Susheela	Vayalar	
2	"Janmabandhangal"	K. J. Yesudas	Vayalar	
3	"Sapthami Chandrane"	P. Susheela, P. Jayachandran	Vayalar	
4	"Vaarmudiyil"	K. J. Yesudas	Vayalar	
