= Kochumon =

- Directed by: K. Padmanabhan Nair
- Written by: Devadatt; K. Padmanabhan Nair (dialogues)
- Screenplay by: K. Padmanabhan Nair
- Produced by: Mamman George
- Starring: Prem Nazir; Sheela; Thikkurissy Sukumaran Nair; T. S. Muthaiah
- Cinematography: B. G. Jagirdhar
- Edited by: P. P. Varghese
- Music by: Alleppey Usman
- Production company: St. George Movies
- Release date: 8 October 1965
- Country: India
- Language: Malayalam

Kochumon (transl. Little Son) is a 1965 Indian Malayalam-language film, directed by K. Padmanabhan Nair and produced by Mamman George. The film stars Prem Nazir, Sheela, Thikkurissy Sukumaran Nair and T. S. Muthaiah. It was released on 8 October 1965.

== Plot ==
The film centers on George, an abandoned boy who grows up as an orphan, navigating a fractured family structure and societal prejudices. As he reaches adulthood, he crosses paths with his biological family, forcing long-hidden secrets and social status divides out into the open.

== Cast ==
- Prem Nazir as George
- Sheela as Lilly
- Thikkurissy Sukumaran Nair as Maalikayil Chackochan
- T. S. Muthaiah as Mathappan
- Mamman George as Johny
- Adoor Pankajam as Maathu
- Ammu as Rosy
- C. R. Lakshmi as Achamma
- Meena as Mary
- Adoor Bhasi as Kunju Nair
- T. R. Omana as Annamma
- Kottayam Shantha as Meenakshi
- Nellikode Bhaskaran as Cheriyan
- Kedamangalam Ali as Kuttappan
- Haji Abdul Rahman as Priest

== Soundtrack ==
The music was composed by Alleppey Usman and lyrics was written by P. J. Eezhakkadavu and P. Bhaskaran.

Song	Singers	Lyrics
"Ithenthulokam Rabbe"	K. J. Yesudas	P. J. Eezhakkadavu
"Maalaakhamaare Marayalle Vaanil"	S. Janaki	P. J. Eezhakkadavu
"Maanathe Yamunathan"	K. J. Yesudas, P. Susheela	P. Bhaskaran
"Odivarum Kaattil"	K. J. Yesudas, P. Susheela	P. J. Eezhakkadavu
"Pachappanamthatha"	L. R. Eeswari	P. Bhaskaran
"Pachilathoppile"	L. R. Eeswari	P. J. Eezhakkadavu
"Thoomanideepamaninju"	P. Susheela	P. Bhaskaran
"Uttavalo"	P. B. Sreenivas	P. Bhaskaran
