= Thiruvabharanam (film) =

- Directed by: J. Sasikumar
- Written by: J. Sasikumar; Jagathy N. K. Achari (dialogues)
- Screenplay by: Jagathy N. K. Achari
- Produced by: E. K. Thyagarajan
- Starring: Prem Nazir; Vijayasree; Madhu; Jayabharathi; Kaviyoor Ponnamma
- Cinematography: C. J. Mohan
- Edited by: K. Sankunni
- Music by: R. K. Shekhar
- Production company: Sree Murugalaya Films
- Distributed by: Sree Murugalaya Films
- Release date: 2 March 1973
- Country: India
- Language: Malayalam

Thiruvabharanam is a 1973 Indian Malayalam-language film, directed by J. Sasikumar and produced by E. K. Thyagarajan. The film stars Prem Nazir, Madhu, Vijayasree, Jayabharathi and Kaviyoor Ponnamma. The film had musical score by R. K. Shekhar.

== Cast ==
- Prem Nazir
- Madhu
- Vijayasree
- Jayabharathi
- Kaviyoor Ponnamma
- Thikkurissy Sukumaran Nair
- Adoor Bhasi
- Sreelatha Namboothiri
- Bahadoor
- Jose Prakash
- Sankaradi
- T. S. Muthaiah
- Vincent
- K. P. Ummer
- Manavalan Joseph
- Kaduvakkulam Antony
- Paravoor Bharathan
- Thodupuzha Radhakrishnan
- Matthew Plathottam
- Usilaimani
- P. R. Menon
- Sadhana
- Meena
- Jessy
- Ambili
- Lissy
- Khadeeja

== Soundtrack ==
The music was composed by R. K. Shekhar and the lyrics were written by Sreekumaran Thampi.

No.	Song	Singers	Lyrics	Length (m:ss)
1	"Ambalamettile Thamburaatti"	K. J. Yesudas, P. Madhuri	Sreekumaran Thampi	
2	"Ettupaaduvan Mathramaay"	K. J. Yesudas, P. Leela	Sreekumaran Thampi	
3	"Swarnam Chirikkunnu"	K. J. Yesudas	Sreekumaran Thampi	
4	"Thaazhvara Charthiya"	K. J. Yesudas	Sreekumaran Thampi	
5	"Thalakku Mukalil"	P. Jayachandran	Sreekumaran Thampi	
