= Ullasa Yaathra =

- Directed by: A. B. Raj
- Written by: Jagathy N. K. Achary
- Screenplay by: Jagathy N. K. Achary
- Produced by: Ravikumar
- Starring: Jayan; Sheela; Lakshmi; Sukumari; K. P. A. C. Lalitha
- Cinematography: N. Karthikeyan; Sreekumaran Thampi (lyrics)
- Edited by: K. Sankunni
- Music by: M. S. Viswanathan
- Production company: Ravikumar Films
- Distributed by: Ravikumar Films
- Release date: 23 May 1975
- Country: India
- Language: Malayalam

Ullasa Yaathra is a 1975 Indian Malayalam-language film, directed by A. B. Raj and produced by Ravikumar. The film stars Jayan, Sheela, Lakshmi, Sukumari and K. P. A. C. Lalitha in the lead roles. The film has musical score by M. S. Viswanathan.

== Cast ==
- Jayan
- Sheela
- Sukumari
- K. P. A. C. Lalitha
- Adoor Bhasi
- Jose Prakash
- Lakshmi
- Pattom Sadan
- Prameela
- RaviKumar
- Krishnan Nair
- Sukumaran
- Bahadoor
- Jameela Malik
- Leela
- M. G. Soman
- Paravoor Soman
- Priyan
- Rani Chandra
- Ravi Menon
- Ravikumar
- S. P. Pillai
- Shailaj
- Sinbad
- Thenmozhi

== Soundtrack ==
The music was composed by M. S. Viswanathan and the lyrics were written by Sreekumaran Thampi.

No.	Song	Singers	Lyrics	Length (m:ss)
1	"Anuraagamennaaloru"	K. J. Yesudas, Vani Jairam	Sreekumaran Thampi	
2	"Chirichaal Puthiyoru"	K. J. Yesudas, L. R. Eeswari, Chorus	Sreekumaran Thampi	
3	"Christmas Pushpam Vidarnnu"	K. J. Yesudas, Chorus	Sreekumaran Thampi	
4	"Manju Oh Manju"	K. J. Yesudas	Sreekumaran Thampi	
5	"Manju Oh Manju" (Sad)	K. J. Yesudas	Sreekumaran Thampi	
6	"Nrithashaala Thurannu"	K. J. Yesudas, P. Susheela	Sreekumaran Thampi	
7	"Rambhayethedi Vanna"	L. R. Eeswari, Chorus, Pattom Sadan	Sreekumaran Thampi	
