= Abhimaanam =

1975 film

- Directed by: J. Sasikumar
- Written by: Sreekumaran Thampi
- Screenplay by: Sreekumaran Thampi
- Based on: Bharya Bhartalu (Telugu)
- Produced by: R. S. Prabhu
- Starring: Prem Nazir; Sharada; Sukumari; Kaviyoor Ponnamma
- Cinematography: C. J. Mohan
- Edited by: G. Venkittaraman
- Music by: A. T. Ummer
- Production company: Sree Rajesh Films
- Distributed by: Sree Rajesh Films
- Release date: 25 December 1975
- Country: India
- Language: Malayalam

Abhimaanam is a 1975 Indian Malayalam-language film, directed by J. Sasikumar and produced by R. S. Prabhu. The film stars Prem Nazir, Sharada, Sukumari and Kaviyoor Ponnamma. The film has musical score by A. T. Ummer. It is a remake of the 1961 Telugu film Bharya Bhartalu.

== Cast ==
- Prem Nazir as Murali
- Sharada as Indu
- Sukumari as Leelamani
- Kaviyoor Ponnamma as Kamalamma
- Adoor Bhasi as Appukuttan Nair
- Thikkurissy Sukumaran Nair as Karunakaran Nair
- Manavalan Joseph as Haridas
- Sankaradi as Damodharan Nair
- Shobha as Geetha
- Sreelatha Namboothiri as Jayanthy
- C. A. Balan
- Kedamangalam Ali as Venkideshwara Iyyer
- M. G. Soman as Venugopal
- Mallika Sukumaran
- Meena as Chandrika
- Pala Thankam as Teacher
- Paravoor Bharathan as Murali's Uncle
- S. P. Pillai as Vasu Pilla
- Thrissur Rajan
- Master Raghu as Madhu
- Baby Sumathi as Latha
- T. P. Madhavan as Birthday party guest
- Vanchiyoor Radha as House maid

Plot Medical student Murali is known for having multiple love affairs. One of his girlfriends, Jayanthi, blackmails him by claiming she is pregnant. His father, Public Prosecutor Kraunakarana Nair, compromises with Jayanthi by giving her 10,000 rupees and Murali discontinues his studies. When back in his hometown, he meets a school teacher named Indu and tries to persuade her to be with him, but she resists. Despite rumors of an affair, she eventually resigns from her job and marries Murali. However, she does not want to be his wife and they only act as a married couple. Murali's changed attitude is put to the test and eventually they are able to truly be together. This story is captured in an iconic Malayalam song from the movie that reflects Murali's feelings. The lyrics show his regret and desire for forgiveness from his partner, comparing her to a lotus and vowing not to tarnish her purity with his actions.

The meaning of lyrics . Darling, I am I admitting my mistakes with bursting in tears You are Lakshmi who made the mind to a lotus l Forgive me and forgive me . I won't touch your pious body with my hands which wrote stories of sin . I will not impure the your lips which is holy as a lotus flower with my kisses holy lips of lotus with my kisses.

== Soundtrack ==
The music was composed by A. T. Ummer.

No.	Song	Singers	Lyrics	Length (m:ss)
1	"Chilanka Kettiyaal"	P. Susheela	Sreekumaran Thampi	04:15
2	"Ee Neelathaarakamizhikal"	K. J. Yesudas	Sreekumaran Thampi	04:26
3	"Kanmaniye Urangoo"	P. Jayachandran, P. Madhuri	Sreekumaran Thampi	03:50
4	"Madana Paravasha"	P. Madhuri	Sreekumaran Thampi	01:20
5	"Pottikkaranju Kondomane"	K. J. Yesudas	Sreekumaran Thampi	05:07
6	"Sreethilakam Thirunetti"	P. Susheela	Bharanikkavu Sivakumar	03:59
7	"Thapassu Cheyyum"	K. J. Yesudas	Sreekumaran Thampi	04:30
