= Manvila =

Coordinates: 8°32′35″N 76°53′35″E

Manvila (Monvila) is a place in Trivandrum, the capital city of Kerala. It is located between Sreekaryam and Kulathoor. It is located near the National Highway 66. Trivandrum Technopark and College Of Engineering Trivandrum (CET) are located near Manvila. Manvila Industrial Estate is one of the major industrial areas in Kerala. It houses various industrial firms like Keltron, Family Plastics, Coconics Laptops, Printing Press etc. Roads from Aakkulam, Pangappara, Kazhakoottam and Sreekaryam meet at Manvila. Manvila has seen a growth in the recent years due to the proximity of Technopark and Technovalley, the IT corridor of Kerala. A transmitting station of All India Radio is also present in Manvila.

PIN code: 695583 (Attipra Village), 695581 (Pangappara village)

== Institutions and offices ==
- Keltron Communication Complex
- All India Radio
- Attipra Village Office
- Coconics Ltd
- Family Plastics and Thermoware Pvt Ltd

== Academic institutions ==
- Bharatiya Vidya Bhavan
- Agricultural Co-operative Staff Training Institute (ACSTI)
- Manvila Government Lower Primary School
- Pallottigiri Seminary

== Places of worship ==
- Major Sree Bala Subrahmanya Swami Temple
- Little Flower, Saint Therese of Lisieux Roman Catholic Latin Church
- Swayamprakasha Asramam
- ST.Mary's M.S.C Church Manvila
- Juma Masjid
- Iskcon namahatta, Hare Krishna
- Thampuran Kavu Temple

== Recently ==
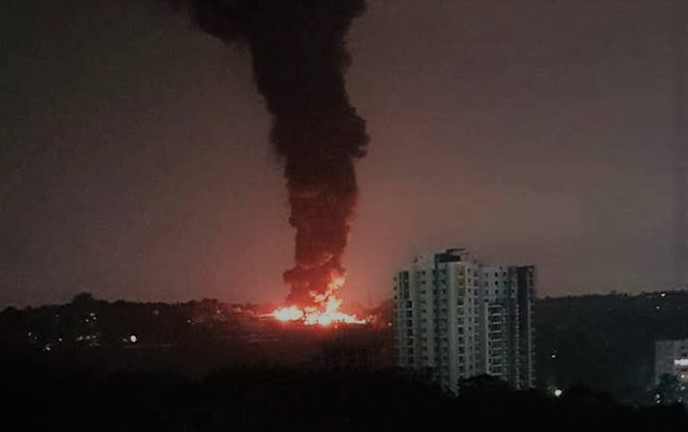
Manvila Family Plastics Fire outbreak

Manvila gained attention in October, 2018, due to a massive fire explosion caused in the Family Plastics Factory.
