= Thottilla =

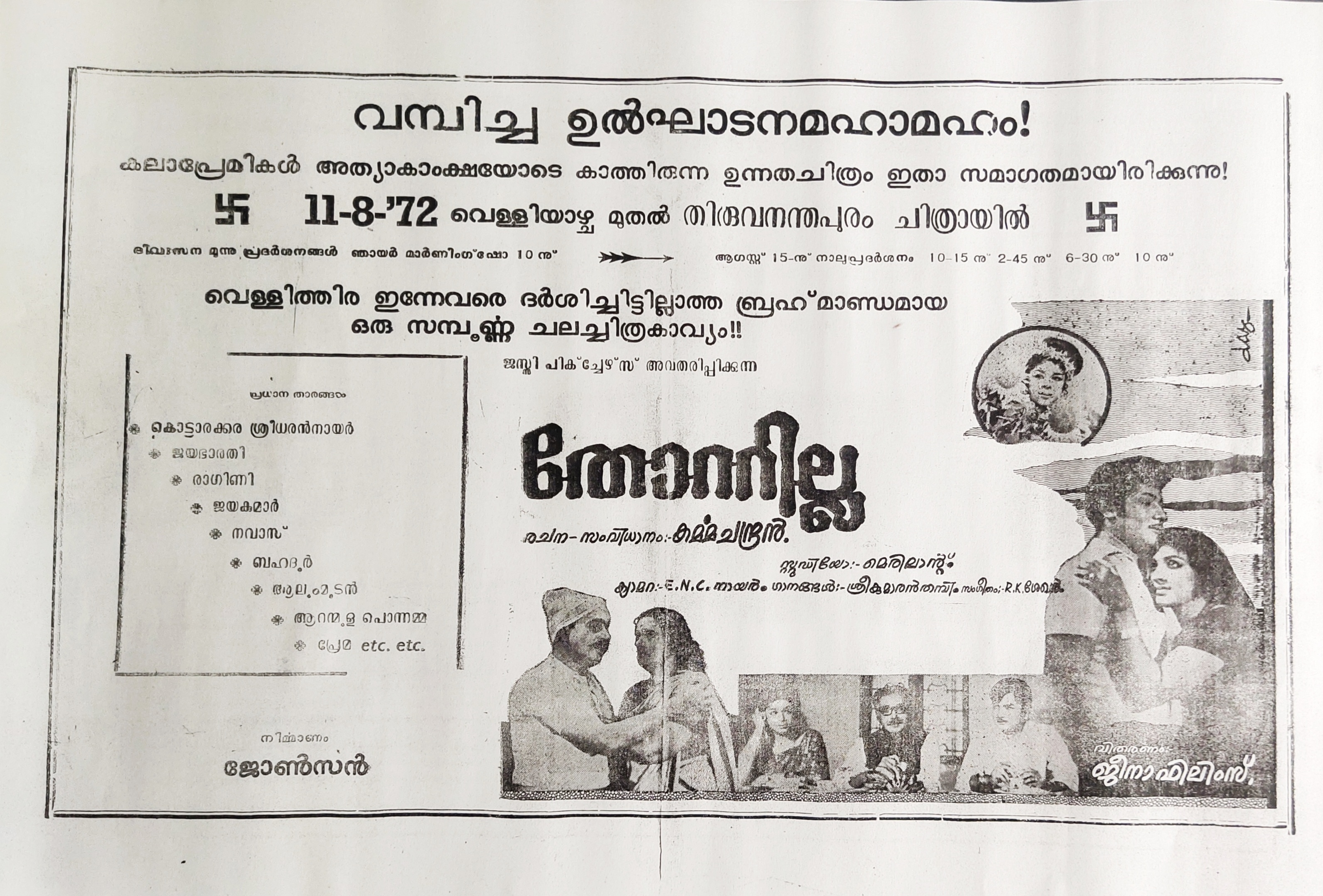
- Directed by: Karmachandran
- Written by: P. Karamchandran
- Screenplay by: P. Karamchandran
- Produced by: Johnson
- Starring: Jayabharathi; Kottarakkara Sreedharan Nair
- Cinematography: E. N. C. Nair
- Edited by: N. Gopalakrishnan
- Music by: R. K. Shekhar
- Release date: 11 August 1972
- Country: India
- Language: Malayalam

Thottilla is a 1972 Indian Malayalam film, directed by Karmachandran and produced by Johnson. The film stars Jayabharathi and Kottarakkara Sreedharan Nair in the lead roles. The film had musical score by R. K. Shekhar.

== Cast ==
- Jayabharathi
- Kottarakkara Sreedharan Nair

== Soundtrack ==
The music was composed by R. K. Shekhar and the lyrics were written by Sreekumaran Thampi.

No.	Song	Singers	Lyrics	Length (m:ss)
1	"Aakaashathottilil"		Sreekumaran Thampi	
2	"Nin nadayil Annanada Kandu"		Sreekumaran Thampi	
3	"Omar Khayyaaminte"		Sreekumaran Thampi	
