= Miss Mary (1972 film) =

- Poster
- Directed by: Jambu
- Written by: Chakrapani; K. G. Sethunath (dialogues)
- Screenplay by: K. G. Sethunath
- Produced by: Jambu
- Starring: Prem Nazir; Renuka; Adoor Bhasi; Prema
- Cinematography: T. M. Sundarababu
- Edited by: C. P. S. Mani
- Music by: R. K. Shekhar
- Production company: Sreemathi Combines
- Distributed by: Sreemathi Combines
- Release date: 4 August 1972
- Country: India
- Language: Malayalam

Miss Mary is a 1972 Indian Malayalam film, directed by Jambu and produced by Jambu. The film stars Prem Nazir, Renuka, Adoor Bhasi and Prema in the lead roles. The film had musical score by R. K. Shekhar.

== Cast ==
- Prem Nazir
- Renuka
- Adoor Bhasi
- Prema
- Sankaradi as Keshava Pilla
- T. R. Omana as Gouri
- T. S. Muthaiah as Paul
- Paul Vengola
- Bahadoor as Raju
- Junior Sheela
- Nellikode Bhaskaran as David
- Veeran

== Soundtrack ==
The music was composed by R. K. Shekhar and the lyrics were written by Sreekumaran Thampi.

No.	Song	Singers	Lyrics	Length (m:ss)
1	"Aakaashathinte Chuvattil"	K. J. Yesudas, Chorus	Sreekumaran Thampi	
2	"Gandharva Gaayakaa"	P. Leela	Sreekumaran Thampi	
3	"Manivarnanillaatha"	P. Susheela, P. Jayachandran	Sreekumaran Thampi	
4	"Neeyente Velicham"	P. Susheela	Sreekumaran Thampi	
5	"Ponnambiliyude"	P. Susheela, P. Jayachandran	Sreekumaran Thampi	
6	"Sangeethame"	S. Janaki, Ambili	Sreekumaran Thampi	
7	"Sangeethame" (Bit)	S. Janaki, Ambili	Sreekumaran Thampi	
