= Kandavarundo =

- Directed by: Mallikarjuna Rao
- Written by: Gopisankar; Sreekumaran Thampi (dialogues)
- Screenplay by: Sreekumaran Thampi
- Produced by: C. J. Ranganathan
- Starring: Sadhana; Vincent; Renuka; Adoor Bhasi
- Cinematography: Kanniyappan
- Edited by: C. P. S. Mani
- Music by: R. K. Shekhar
- Production company: RJ Combines
- Distributed by: RJ Combines
- Release date: 11 February 1972
- Country: India
- Language: Malayalam

Kandavarundo (English: Did Anyone See?) is a 1972 Indian Malayalam film, directed by Mallikarjuna Rao and produced by C. J. Ranganathan. The film stars Sadhana, Vincent, Renuka and Adoor Bhasi in the lead roles. The film had musical score by R. K. Shekhar.

== Cast ==
- Sadhana
- Vincent
- Renuka
- Adoor Bhasi
- Muthukulam Raghavan Pillai
- Sankaradi
- Sreelatha Namboothiri
- T. S. Muthaiah
- Paul Vengola
- A. V. M. Rajan
- Abbas
- Bahadoor
- Florida
- Jayakumari
- Kedamangalam Ali
- Khadeeja
- Baby Vijaya
- Mathew Plathottam
- Menon
- Punaloor Rajan
- Venu
- Koya Chavakkadu
- Haridas
- Radhakrishnan

== Soundtrack ==
The music was composed by R. K. Shekhar and the lyrics were written by Sreekumaran Thampi.

No.	Song	Singers	Lyrics	Length (m:ss)
1	"Kanikkonna Pol"	L. R. Eeswari, Chorus	Sreekumaran Thampi	
2	"Priye Ninakku Vendi"	P. Jayachandran	Sreekumaran Thampi	
3	"Swagatham Swagatham"	K. J. Yesudas	Sreekumaran Thampi	
4	"Udukkukottippaadum"	S. Janaki	Sreekumaran Thampi	
5	"Varnashaalayil Varoo"	S Janaki	Sreekumaran Thampi	
