= R. K. Shekhar =

Indian composer (1933–1976)

- Photo of R. K. Shekhar

Background information
- Born: Rajagopala Kulashekharan Shekhar; 7 November 1933
- Origin: Tiruvallur, Tamil Nadu, British India
- Died: 9 September 1976 (aged 42–43)
- Education: Carnatic music
- Genres: Film score, classical
- Occupations: Film composer, music director, Arranger, Music conductor
- Instrument: Harmonium
- Years active: 1964–1976
- Label: Saregama
- Spouse: Kareema Begum (Kasthuri)

Rajagopala Kulashekharan Shekhar (7 November 1933 (Note: 7 November 1933.) – 9 September 1976) was an Indian music composer who worked primarily for Malayalam cinema. Shekhar served as a music conductor for over 100 films and composed scores for 52 films. He pioneered the early integration of Western classical music orchestration techniques into South Indian film music. He is the father of A. R. Rahman and A. R. Reihana.

His grandchildren A. R. Ameen, Khatija Rahman, G. V. Prakash Kumar, and Bhavani Sre are involved in the music and film industries.

His debut song as a music director was "Chotta Muthal Chudala Vare" ("from cradle to grave"), which was a big hit in Kerala. This was composed for the film Pazhassi Raja (1964).

== Early life ==
He was born in Tiruvallur, Tamil Nadu to K. Rajagopalan, also known as Rajagopalan Bhagavathar, a Harikatha exponent. His entry into film music was opened through his extraordinary performances on harmonium for theatre plays. He started his career in the film industry as an assistant to music director M. B. Sreenivasan.

Later on he conducted and arranged music for famous Malayalam music directors M. K. Arjunan and V. Dakshinamoorthy. He was so fascinated by the tunes created by these legends that he would work very hard single-handedly to create the background music of the songs they tuned to match their purity and standard, thus making the songs evergreen and on par. Their association lasted until his death.

Shekhar was also known as an innovator who introduced electronic music instruments to South Indian music, bringing equipment from Singapore. He introduced synthesizers such as Univox and Clavioline to South Indian music and was among the first to experiment with these instruments. Shekhar also introduced young talents to the film industry, including singers S. P. Balasubrahmanyam and M. Balamuralikrishna to Malayalam film songs in the film Yogamullaval.

== Career ==
His career as an independent music composer started with the 1964 film Pazhassi Raja, of which the philosophical song "Chotta Muthal Chudala Vare" ("from cradle to grave") became a big hit in Kerala. As a composer, Shekhar composed music for 52 films and was the music conductor for more than 100 films. He also worked as an assistant and conductor to Salil Chowdhury for the film Chemmeen (1965), which went on to become a National Film Award winner. After his work in Aisha, he turned back to arranging and conducting for other composers.

After a gap of seven years, he returned to music composing through the film Anaathashilpangal in 1971. Apart from arranging hit songs like "Ninmaniarayile" and "Neela Nishidhini" for C.I.D. Nazir (1971) directed by P. Venu, he composed music for his next film Taxi Car in 1972. He then went on to compose music for approximately 20 films. Due to the commercial failure of these films at the box office, his songs went largely unnoticed and he received fewer opportunities for composing.

His close friend in the industry was composer M. K. Arjunan. Starting from Arjunan's first film, Shekhar assisted him in all his films until his death. Continuous hard work took a toll on Shekhar's health. During these difficult times, Arjunan served as the caretaker of him and his family.

Shekhar composed tunes for his last film Chottanikkara Amma (1976) when he was bedridden for treatment, and he died on 30 September 1976 leaving the project incomplete. Later, M. K. Arjunan completed the project by arranging and recording the songs that Shekhar had composed. The romantic song "Manasu Manasinte Kaathil" from this film became an evergreen classic.

== R. K. Shekhar family ==
R. K. Shekhar was married to Kasthuri Shekhar (later Kareema Begum; d. 28 December 2020). Their marriage took place at Tirumala Venkateswara Temple, one of the most prominent Hindu temples in India, located in Tirupati. Shekhar and Kasthuri had four children: A. R. Rahman (born A. S. Dileep Kumar), A. R. Reihana (born Kanchana Shekhar), Fathima Rafiq, and Ishrath Qadri.

Shekhar died on 30 September 1976 at the age of 43. His grandchildren include Rahman's children A. R. Ameen and Khatija Rahman, as well as Reihana's children G. V. Prakash Kumar and Bhavani Sre, all of whom are involved in the music and film industries.

The family fell on hard times after Shekhar's death. They came under the guidance of Sufi peer Karimullah Shah Qadri and later converted to Islam. Rahman's name change from Dileep Kumar to Allah Rakha Rahman was suggested by a Hindu astrologer.

== Legacy ==
Shekhar is remembered as one of the most talented music arrangers and conductors in Malayalam cinema, though his contributions often went uncredited as he prioritized earning over recognition. He was known among his contemporaries as a "dream assistant" who would sometimes replace composers' tunes with his own creations to improve the final product, without taking credit for his work.

His son A. R. Rahman has frequently credited his father's influence on his own musical career. Rahman stated, "The memories of my father remain my inspiration... I think he died of excessive exertion... Beneficiaries have recounted to me how my father helped them, how he created opportunities for them." Rahman also noted, "Maybe it's the result of everything my dad did, all of his hard work, that I'm enjoying now. All the good karma." Many of Shekhar's traits—including his innovative approach to electronic instruments, his perfectionism, and his experimental mindset—are seen as precursors to Rahman's own musical style.

Shekhar's pioneering introduction of electronic instruments like the Univox and Clavioline to South Indian music laid groundwork for future generations of film composers. His work in launching the careers of singers like S. P. Balasubrahmanyam and M. Balamuralikrishna in Malayalam cinema also contributed to his lasting influence on the industry.

== Filmography ==
=== As music director ===
- Pazhassi Raja (1964)
- Aayisha (1964)
- Anaathashilpangal (1971)
- Yogamullaval (1971)
- C.I.D. Nazir (1971) – arranger
- Taxi Car (1972)
- Sumangali (1973)
- Akashaganga (1973)
- Aradi Manninte Janmi (1973)
- Kandavarundo? (1973)
- Miss Mary (1973)
- Thottilla (1973)
- Thiruvabharanam (1973)
- Kapalika (1973)
- Chithariya Pookkal (1973)
- Pattabhishekham (1974)
- Nadeenadanmare Avashyamundu (1974)
- Thamarathoni (1975)
- Pen Pada (1975)
- Priyae Ninakku Vendi (1975)
- Velicham Akale (1975)
- Kuttichathan (1975)
- Yudhabhoomi (1975)
- Thiruvonam (1975) – background score
- Chottanikkara Amma (1976)

Shekhar also worked as a music conductor and arranger for over 100 films in Malayalam cinema.
