= Anadha Shilpangal =

Anaadha Shilpangal
- Directed by: M. K. Ramu
- Written by: Venkiteswar; S. L. Puram Sadanandan (dialogues)
- Screenplay by: S. L. Puram Sadanandan
- Produced by: P. S. Veerappa
- Starring: Prasad; Sankaradi; Sreelatha Namboothiri; T. R. Omana
- Cinematography: V. Namas
- Edited by: S. A. Murukesh
- Music by: R. K. Shekhar
- Production company: PSV Pictures
- Distributed by: PSV Pictures
- Release date: 7 May 1971
- Country: India
- Language: Malayalam

Anaadha Shilpangal is a 1971 Indian Malayalam film, directed by M. K. Ramu and produced by P. S. Veerappa. The film stars Prasad, Sankaradi, Sreelatha Namboothiri and T. R. Omana in the lead roles. The film had musical score by R. K. Shekhar.

== Cast ==
- Prasad
- M. L. Saraswathi as Radha
- Sankaradi as Samar's father
- Sreelatha Namboothiri as Ammini
- T. R. Omana as Kamalamma, Radha and Ammini's mother
- Bahadoor as Samar
- Usharani
- Prem Nawas as Jagadeeshan
- Paul Vengola
- William Thomas
- Kalmanam Murali
- Sudheer as Suresh (the son of Radha)
- Jayshree T. in item number

== Soundtrack ==
The music was composed by R. K. Shekhar and the lyrics were written by Sreekumaran Thampi.

No.	Song	Singers	Lyrics	Length (m:ss)
1	"Achankovilaattile"	S. Janaki, P. Jayachandran	Sreekumaran Thampi	
2	"Kathaatha Karthika"	P. Susheela	Sreekumaran Thampi	
3	"Paathividarnnoru"	S. Janaki	Sreekumaran Thampi	
4	"Sandhyaaraagam Maanjukazhinju"	K. J. Yesudas	Sreekumaran Thampi	
5	"Theerthayaathra Thudangi"	K. J. Yesudas	Sreekumaran Thampi	
