= Tourist Bungalow =

- Directed by: A. B. Raj
- Written by: Balu Mahendra; Sreemoolanagaram Vijayan (dialogues)
- Screenplay by: Sreemoolanagaram Vijayan
- Starring: Prem Nazir; Jayabharathi; Kaviyoor Ponnamma; Adoor Bhasi
- Cinematography: Balu Mahendra
- Edited by: M. S. Mani
- Music by: M. K. Arjunan
- Production company: HR Films
- Distributed by: HR Films
- Release date: 2 May 1975
- Country: India
- Language: Malayalam

Tourist Bungalow is a 1975 Indian Malayalam-language film directed by A. B. Raj. The film stars Prem Nazir, Jayabharathi, Kaviyoor Ponnamma and Adoor Bhasi in the lead roles. The film has musical score by M. K. Arjunan.

== Cast ==
- Prem Nazir
- Jayabharathi
- Kaviyoor Ponnamma
- Adoor Bhasi
- Bahadoor
- M. G. Soman
- N. Govindankutty
- Vincent

== Soundtrack ==
The music was composed by M. K. Arjunan and the lyrics were written by O. N. V. Kurup. The song 'Kannezhuthi Pottuthottu' marks the debut of singer Sujatha Mohan.

No.	Song	Singers	Lyrics	Length (m:ss)
1	"Chellu Chellu Menake"	P. Jayachandran	O. N. V. Kurup	
2	"Kaanal Jalathin"	L. R. Eeswari	O. N. V. Kurup	
3	"Kalivilakkin"	K. J. Yesudas	O. N. V. Kurup	
4	"Kannezhuthi Pottuthottu"	Sujatha Mohan	O. N. V. Kurup	
5	"Premathinu Kannilla"	Cochin Ibrahim, Zero Babu	O. N. V. Kurup	
