= Aaradimanninte Janmi =

1972 film

- Directed by: P. Bhaskaran
- Screenplay by: Sreekumaran Thampi
- Story by: K. Balachander
- Produced by: P. Bhaskaran
- Starring: Prem Nazir; Madhu; Sheela; Jayabharathi
- Cinematography: S. J. Thomas
- Edited by: K. Sankunni
- Music by: R. K. Shekhar
- Production company: Janani Films
- Release date: 4 February 1972
- Country: India
- Language: Malayalam

Aaradimanninte Janmi (transl. Owner of Six Measures of Land) is a 1972 Indian Malayalam-language film, directed and produced by P. Bhaskaran. The film stars Prem Nazir, Madhu, Sheela and Jayabharathi. It is a remake of the Tamil film Neerkumizhi.

== Cast ==
- Prem Nazir as K. Sethumadhavan Nair
- Madhu as Prasad
- Sheela as Dr. Jayanthi
- Jayabharathi as Sumathi
- Adoor Bhasi as Philipose Muthalaali
- Jose Prakash as Dr. Menon
- Sankaradi as Storekeeper Shankara Kurup
- Sujatha as Nurse Nirmala
- T. K. Balachandran as Murali
- Prema as Nurse Marikkutty
- Baby Shobha as Mini
- Paul Vengola as Peon Ramu
- Aravindakshan as D'Cruz
- Bahadoor as Ouseppu Chettan
- Philomina as Vishalakshi Amma
- C. A. Balan as Avaran
- Ramankutty Menon as Old Man
- Pala Thankam as Murali's Mother

== Soundtrack ==
The music was composed by R. K. Shekhar and lyrics for the songs written by P. Bhaskaran and Sreekumaran Thampi.

No.	Song	Singers	Lyrics	Length (m:ss)
1	"Aarorumillaatha"	K. J. Yesudas	P. Bhaskaran	
2	"Innale Raaviloru"	S. Janaki	P. Bhaskaran	
3	"Pathinanchithalulla Pournamippoovinte"	S. Janaki	Sreekumaran Thampi	
4	"Thudakkavum Odukkavum"	K. J. Yesudas	Sreekumaran Thampi	
