= Prema (Malayalam actress) =

Indian actress in Malayalam movies

- Born: Chennai, India
- Died: 5 April 1984
- Occupation: Actress
- Years active: 1954–1982
- Spouse: K. P. Menon
- Children: Shoba

Prema was an Indian actress in Malayalam cinema. She acted mainly in supporting and character roles as a mother, during the 1960s and 1970s and appeared in more than 50 films in her career. She was the mother of actress Shoba.

== Personal life ==
Prema was married to K. P. Menon. National Award-winning actress Shoba was her daughter. She committed suicide in 1984. Her daughter was also alleged to have taken her own life.

== Filmography ==
1. Lahari (1982)
2. Thushaaram (1981)
3. Viswaroopam (1978)
4. Velluvili (1978) as Parvathi
5. Padmatheertham (1978) as Madhaviyamma
6. Madhuraswapnam (1977)
7. Sankhupushpam (1977) as Madhaviyamma
8. Ormakal Marikkumo (1977) as Lakshmi
9. Minimol (1977)
10. Aaraadhana (1977)
11. Priyamvada (1976)
12. Paalkkadal (1976)
13. Pushpasharam (1976)
14. Amba Ambika Ambaalika (1976)
15. Ayalkkaari (1976) as Meenakshi
16. Swapnadanam (1976) as Kalyaniyamma
17. Kaayamkulam Kochunniyude Makan (1976)
18. Naazhikakkallu (1970)
19. Chirikkudukka (1976) as Bhargavi
20. Thulavarsham (1976) as Maniyan's Mother
21. Abhinandanam (1976)
22. Chottaanikkara Amma (1976)
23. Ammini Ammaavan (1976)
24. Criminals (Kayangal) (1975)
25. Pravaaham (1975) as Rajamma
26. Chief Guest (1975)
27. Dharmakshetre Kurukshetre (1975)
28. Priyamulla Sophia (1975)
29. Priye Ninakkuvendi (1975)
30. Mattoru Seetha (1975)
31. Raagam (1975)
32. Sooryavamsam (1975)
33. Rahasyaraathri (1974)
34. Ayalathe Sundari (1974) as Karthyayani
35. College Girl (1974) as Ichaamina
36. Sethubandhanam (1974)
37. Kaamini (1974)
38. Veendum Prabhaatham (1973)
39. Panitheeratha Veedu (1973) as Sister
40. Manushyaputhran (1973)
41. Thottavadi (1973) as Pulluvathi
42. Kaattuvithachavan (1973)
43. Pacha Nottukal (1973) as Lovelamma
44. Ajnaathavasam (1973) as Rajamma
45. Driksakshi (1973) as Karthyayani
46. Padmavyooham (1973) as Rosamma
47. Punarjanmam (1972)
48. Panimudakku (1972)
49. Theertha Yathra (1972)
50. Aaradi Manninte Janmi (1972) as Mariakutty
51. Nrithasaala (1972) as Gomathi
52. Miss Mary (1972) as Saramma
53. Taxi Car (1972) as Kamalam
54. Naadan Premam (1972)
55. Omana (1972) as Leelamma
56. Sambhavami Yuge Yuge (1972) as Annamma
57. Ananthasayanam (1972)
58. Puthrakameshti (1972)
59. Pushpaanjali (1972) as Renuka
60. Vivaha Sammanam (1971)
61. Thettu (1971) as Lissie
62. Inquilab Zindabad (1971)
63. Sindooracheppu (1971) as Devu
64. Makane Ninakku Vendi (1971) as Saramma
65. Poompaatta (1971) as Janaki
66. Thapaswini (1971)
67. Oru Penninte Katha (1971) as Nun
68. Aval Alpam Vaikippoyi (1971)
69. Vivaaham Swargathil (1970)
70. Abhayam (1970)
71. Lottery Ticket (1970) as Bharathi
72. Aa Chithrashalabham Parannotte (1970)
73. Raktha Pushpam (1970)
74. Vidyaarthi (1968)
75. Shakuntala (1965)
76. Nairu Pidicha Pulivalu (1958) as Lalitha
77. Rarichan Enna Pauran (1956)
78. Avar Unarunnoo (1956)
79. Neelakuyil (1954) as Nalini
