= K. P. Brahmanandan =

- Born: Kadakkavoor Pachan Brahmanandan; February 22, 1946; Kadakkavoor, Trivandrum, India
- Died: August 10, 2004 (aged 58) Kadakkavoor, Trivandrum, India
- Occupation: Singer
- Years active: 1969-2004

Kadakkavoor Pachan Brahmanandan (22 February 1946 – 10 August 2004) was a South Indian playback singer from Kerala.

== Personal life ==
Brahmanandan was born in Kadakkavoor, which is located north of Trivandrum district in Kerala, on 22 February 1946. His parents were Pachan and Bhavani. He was the third of his parents' eight children. He began to study Carnatic music from a young age, firstly from his uncle Kadakkavoor Sundaram Bhagavathar, and later from the eminent musician D. K. Jayaraman. Brahmanandan was the father of Rakesh Brahmanandan, another Malayalam singer.

Brahmanandan died at his home in Kadakkavoor on 10 August 2004, at the age of 58. He was cremated on the premises of his home the next day. He is survived by his wife Usha, son Rakesh and daughter Athira.

== Awards ==
Brahmanandan received All-India Radio Award in 1965, Critics Award in 1999, and Kerala Sangeetha Nataka Akademi Award in 2002.

== Career ==
He also sang for a dozen Tamil films, for composers such as Ilaiyaraja...Santha Kavigal for Tamil movie "Metti" from Director Mahendran and Shankar–Ganesh, and composed the music for two movies, `Malayathi Pennu' and `Kanni Nilaavu'.

"Brahmanandan Foundation", constituted in memory of Brahmanandan encourages projects that promote values in line with particular interests that are well informed, that have clearly defined goals, and that are innovative and risk-taking, while acknowledging traditional standards of excellence and responsibility to the music. The foundation has also constituted Brahmanandan memorial award, for excellence in Music.
