= Vayalar =

Vayalar village
- village
- Interactive map of Vayalar village
- Coordinates: 9.7225°N 76.3375°E
- Country: India
- State: Kerala
- District: Alappuzha

Area
  - Total: 14.44 km^{2} (5.58 sq mi)
- Elevation: 3 m (9.8 ft)

Population (1991)
  - Total: 22,384
  - Density: 1,550/km^{2} (4,000/sq mi)

Languages
  - Official: Malayalam, English
- Time zone: UTC+5:30 (IST)
- PIN: 688536.
- Telephone code: 0478
- Vehicle registration: KL 32
- Sex ratio: 1.047 ♂/♀
- Lok Sabha constituency: Alappuzha
- Vidhan Sabha constituency: Cherthala

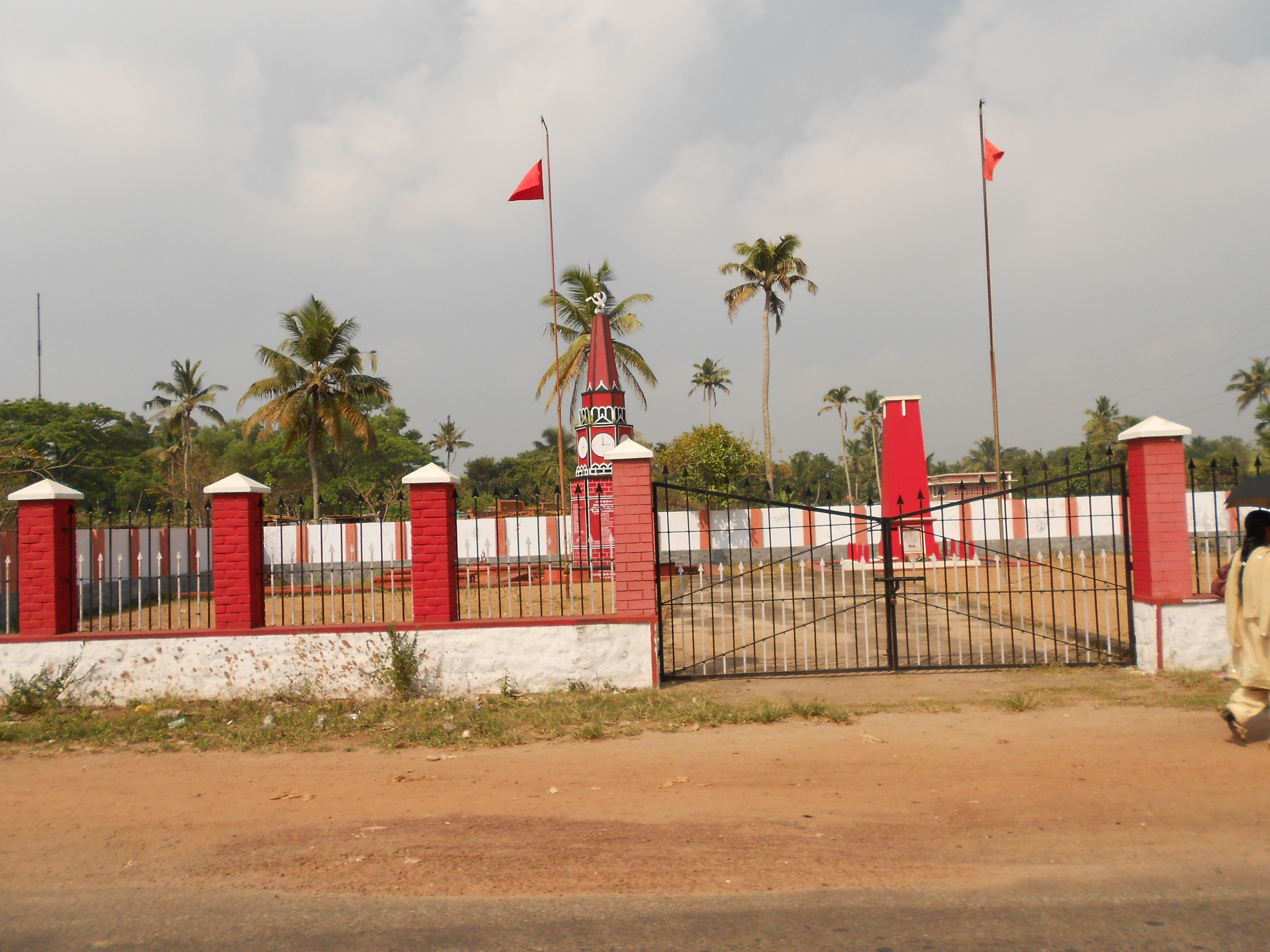
Communist Memorial

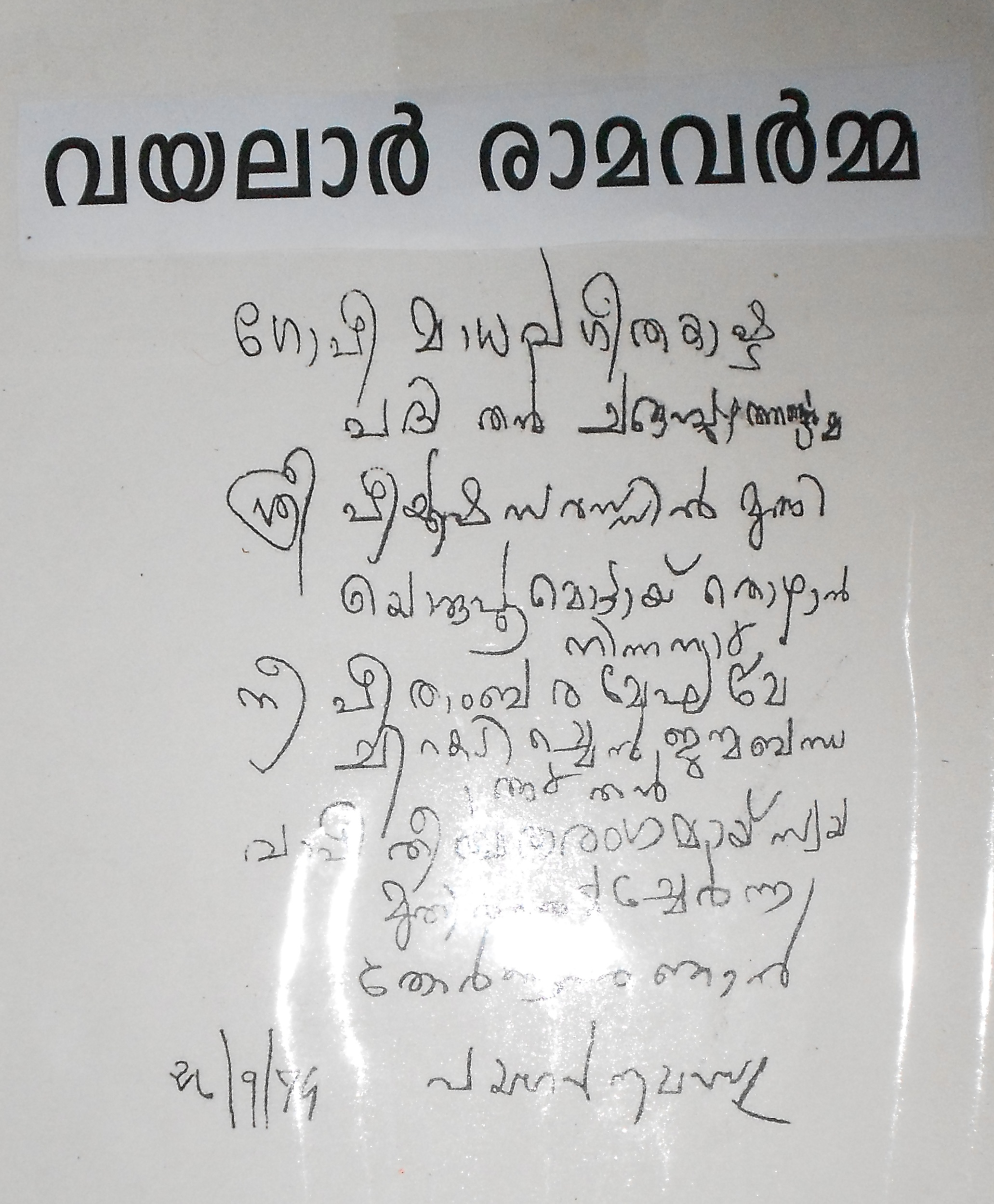
Poet Vayalar Ramavarma

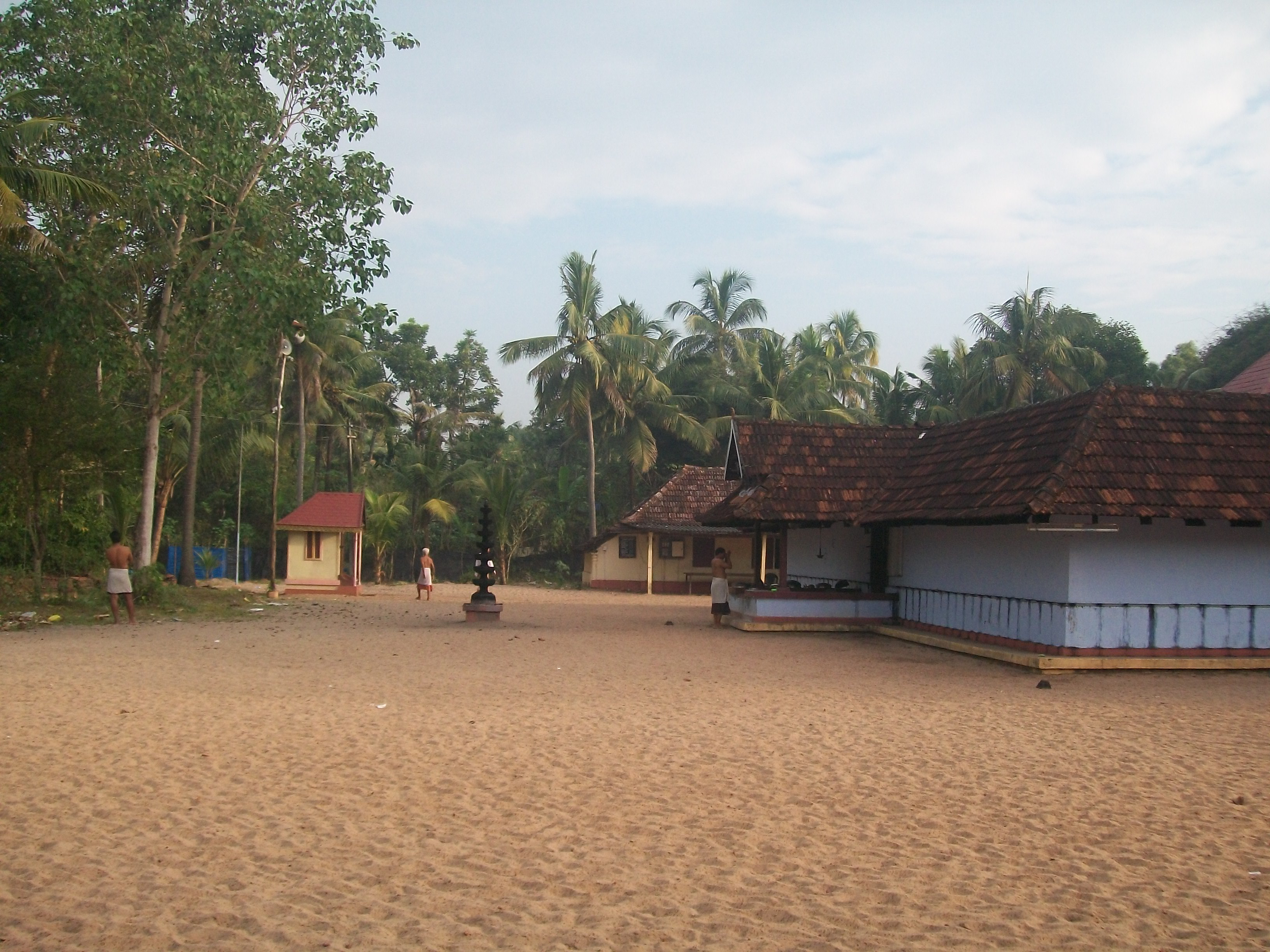
Nagam Kulangara temple

Vayalar (Malayalam: [ʋɐjɐlaːr]) is a village in Cherthala taluk, Alapuzha district, Kerala state, India.

== Location ==
Vayalar is 5 km from Cherthala, Kerala. Vayalar is bounded on the east by the Vayalar kayal which is a part of the famous Vembanad backwaters. The Vayalar road connecting Vayalar with Cherthala is its life line. Vayalar is connected to NH 47 by another road.

== Schools ==
There are 2 lower primary schools and one high school in Vayalar. These are government schools. The high school is named after the Malayalam poet Vayalar Ramavarma who hails from this place. Vayalar North Lower Primary School is a government primary school located on the Ettupurackal road. Many people depend on schools in the Cherthala town and in nearby Pattanakkad for education.

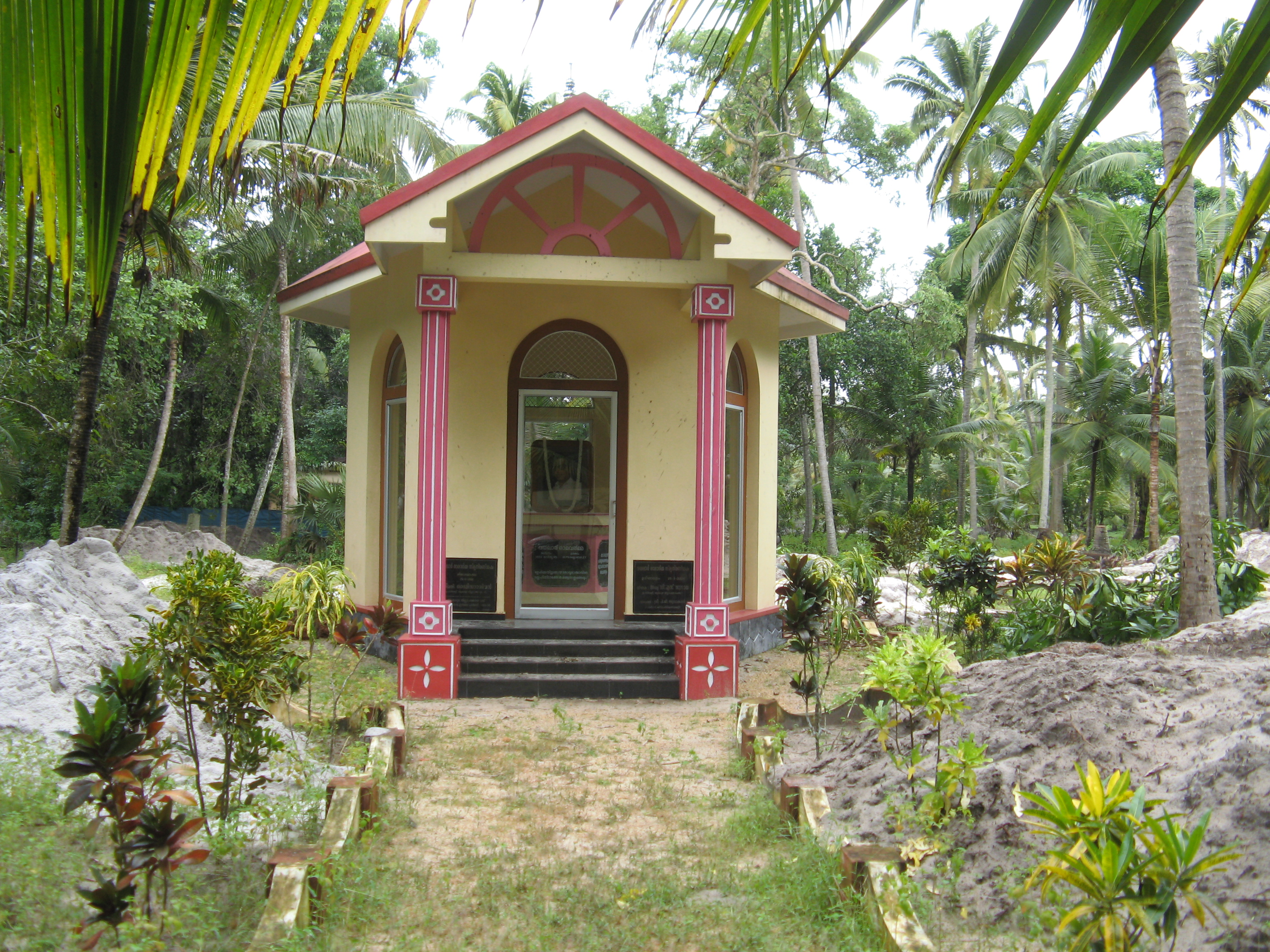
Rama Varma Smriti Mandapam

== Temples ==
The main religion in this place is Hinduism followed by Islam and Christianity. There is a krishna temple Keraladithyapuram Sreekrishna Swamy Temple and The Shiva temple in Nagamkulangara are famous. Apart from that there are numerous smaller temples and a few mosques and churches. People of all religions live here in harmony.

== Economy ==
The major livelihood of people here is coir making, fishing and shrimp farming. A large number of people work as skilled or unskilled labourers. These people find their employment in the coir industry, the construction industry, the sea food industry and various other businesses in nearby Cherthala and Cochin city.

== Communist Memorial ==
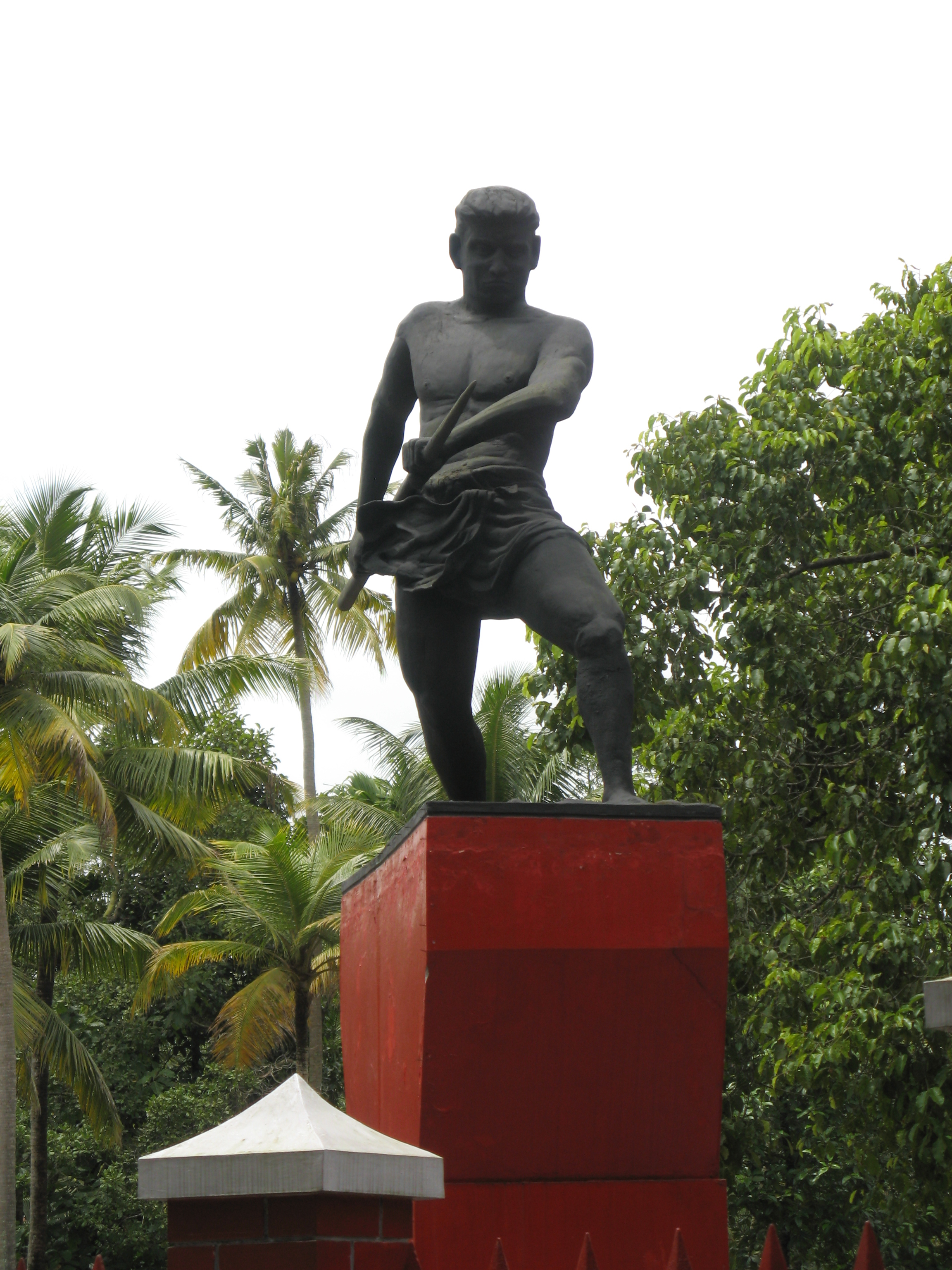
Raktha Sakshi Mandapam

The major landmark of Vayalar is the "Raktha Sakshi Mandapam". It is a memorial to the hundreds who died fighting against the rule Divan of Travancore Sir C.P. Ramaswami Iyer in 1946. The revolt was orchestrated by the Communist Party of India. T. V. Thomas, M.N. Govindan Nair, Kunthrisseril Kumara Panicker (Vayalar Stalin), Kunthrisseril C. Velayudan (Vayalar Mooppan) were few among many lead the revolt and faced the punishments. Many members of the Kunthrisseril family were killed or arrested during and after the Vayalar revolt. The revolters were armed with nothing more than wooden spears and were overpowered by gun wielding police of erstwhile Travancore State. The incident took place on 10th of month of Thulam according to Malayalam calendar. Even to this day 'Thulam pathu' (10th of Thulam) is observed solemnly.

== Punnapra-Vayalar uprising ==
The village is also known for the Punnapra-Vayalar uprising of 1946 in Kerala. The uprising against Diwan C P Ramaswamy Aiyar was a significant event of the working class which revolted against oppression and is know in the district’s history. Former chief minister Achuthanandan was one of the last flagbearers of the uprising.

== Administration ==
This is a panchayat which comes under the Cherthala Assembly constituency and the Alapuzha Lok Sabha constituency.

== Notable people ==
- Vayalar Ramavarma
- Vayalar Sarath Chandra Varma
- Vayalar Ravi, Former Central Minister & leader of Indian National Congress Party
