= M. K. Arjunan =

Indian composer (1936–2020)

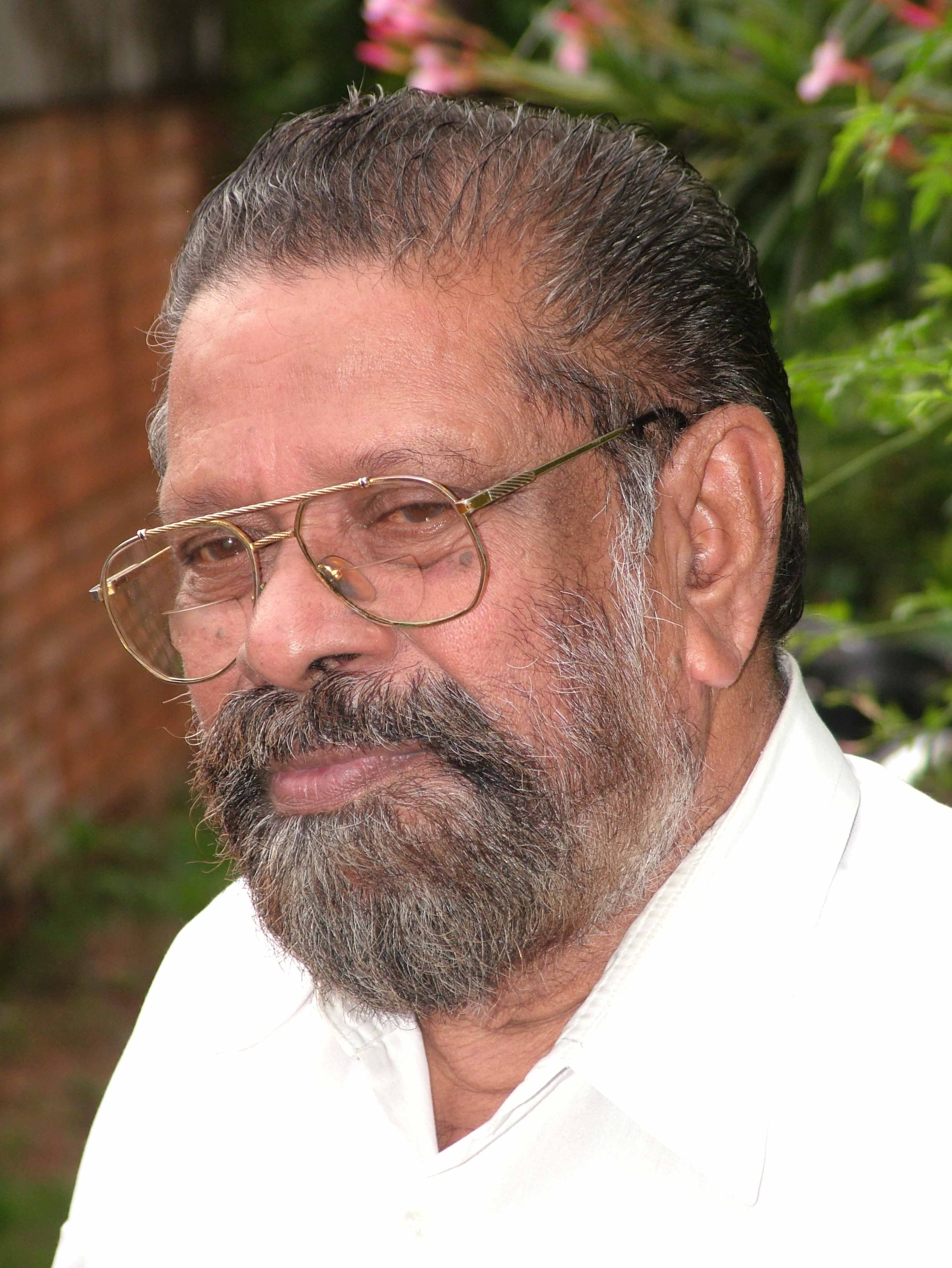

Background information
- Born: 1 March 1936; Fort Cochin, Cochin
- Died: 6 April 2020 (aged 84) Kochi, Kerala, India
- Genres: Film music, theatre music
- Occupations: Theatre composer, film composer, music director
- Instrument: Harmonium
- Years active: 1950-2020
- Spouse: Bharathi (m. 1964)

Maliyekkal Kochukunju Arjunan (1 March 1936 – 6 April 2020) was an Indian film and theatre composer, known for his works in Malayalam cinema and the theatre of Kerala. He was fondly referred to as Arjunan Master.

== Early life ==
Arjunan was born at Chirattapalam in Fort Kochi (now part of India) on 1 March 1936 as the youngest of 14 children born to Kochukunju and Parvathi (Paru), among whom only four survived childhood. He lost his father at a young age and his mother, unable to provide for all her children, sent Arjunan and his brother, Prabhakaran, to Jeevakarunyananda Ashram at Palani where Arjunan got his first lessons in music. After school, the students would sing bhajans; his singing led the head of the ashram to give him music lessons. For the next few years Arjunan learned music from Kumarayya Pillai. He later learnt music under K.N. Vijayarajan Master.

== Career and death ==
After composing music for amateur plays, he became a professional and worked with Changanassery Geedha, People's Theatre, Kalidasa Kalakendram, Desabhimani Theatres, Alleppey Theatres and KPAC. Arjunan went on to compose around 800 songs for 300 plays.

Arjunan's first movie as a composer was Karuthapurnami, released in 1968. His association with the leading lyricist Sreekumaran Thampi in almost 50 films was one of the most prolific composer-lyricist partnerships in Malayalam film industry.

During a career spanning 50 years in cinema, Arjunan scored music for more than 500 songs in over 218 Malayalam films.

He is also credited with giving A. R. Rahman his first musical break by giving him a chance to play keyboards in a film.

His last film was Vellaram Kunnile Vellimeenukal, with songs written by Rajeev Alunkal. His last music composition was in December 2019 for Sreek Music's three love songs written by lyricist Sreekanth M Girinath. He died at his home at 3:30 AM IST on 6 April 2020, aged 84, and was cremated with full state honours at Palluruthy crematorium on the same day. Due to COVID-19, his funeral was conducted under strict protocols. He is survived by his sons Ashokan and Anil, and daughters Rekha, Nimmi and Sreekala. Bharathi Arjunan, his wife of 56 years, died in July 2021 due to COVID-19.

== Awards ==
- Kerala Sangeetha Nataka Akademi Award - 1992
- Kerala Sangeetha Nataka Akademi Fellowship - 2008
- 48th Kerala State Film Awards for Kerala State Film Award for Best Music Director - 2017-Bhayanakam
- Kerala Film Critics Association Awards 2018 - Chalachitra Rathna award
- Mazhavil Mango Music Awards - 2018-Lifetime achievement
- Thudi cultural forum K Raghavan puraskaram - 2019
