= List of Malayalam films of 1967 =

The following is a list of Malayalam films released in 1967.

Opening		Film	Cast	Director	Music director	Notes
F E B	3	Sahadharmini	Sathyan, Kaviyoor Ponnamma	P. A. Thomas	B. A. Chidambaranath	
F E B	10	Indulekha	Rajmohan, Sreekala	Kalanilayam Krishnan Nair	V. Dakshinamoorthy	
F E B	24	Jeevikkan Anuvadikku	Prem Nazir, Adoor Bhasi	P. A. Thomas	Vijaya Bhaskar	
M A R	2	Iruttinte Athmavu	Prem Nazir, Thikkurissy	P. Bhaskaran	M. S. Baburaj	
M A R	3	Sheelavathi	Sathyan, K. R. Vijaya	P. B. Unni	G. Devarajan	
M A R	18	Agniputhri	Prem Nazir, Sheela	M. Krishnan Nair	M. S. Baburaj	
M A R	22	Kottayam Kolacase	Prem Nazir, Sheela	K. S. Sethumadhavan	B. A. Chidambaranath	
A P R	14	Udhyogastha	Prem Nazir, Sathyan	P. Venu	M. S. Baburaj	
A P R	14	Arakkillam	Sathyan, Sharada	N. Sankaran Nair	G. Devarajan	
A P R	14	Balyakalasakhi	Prem Nazir, Sheela	Sasikumar	M. S. Baburaj	
A P R	14	Lady Doctor	Madhu, Sheela	K. Sukumar	V. Dakshinamoorthy	
A P R	28	Postman	Sathyan, Kaviyoor Ponnamma	P. A. Thomas	B. A. Chidambaranath	
J U N	2	Mynatharuvi Kolakase	Sathyan, Sheela	Kunchacko	V. Dakshinamoorthy	
J U N	9	Karutha Rathrikal	Madhu, Gemini Ganesan	Mahesh	M. S. Baburaj	
J U N	16	Madatharuvi	Sukumari, Adoor Bhasi	P. A. Thomas	B. A. Chidambaranath	
J U N	30	Aval	Madhu, Adoor Bhasi	P. M. A. Azeez	Devarajan	
J U L	21	Bhagyamudra	Prem Nazir, Sukumari	M. A. V. Rajendran	Pukazhenthi	
A U G	11	Kaanatha Veshangal	Prem Nazir, Sheela	M. Krishnan Nair	B. A. Chidambaranath	
A U G	18	Khadeeja	Sathyan, Madhu	M. Krishnan Nair	M. S. Baburaj	
S E P	8	Anweshichu Kandethiyilla	Madhu, K. R. Vijaya	P. Bhaskaran	M. S. Baburaj	
S E P	14	Collector Malathy	Prem Nazir, Sheela	M. Krishnan Nair	M. S. Baburaj	
S E P	15	Ashwamedham	Prem Nazir, Sathyan	A. Vincent	G. Devarajan	
S E P	29	Chithramela	Prem Nazir, Sheela	T. S. Muthaiah	G. Devarajan	
O C T	5	Nagarame Nandi	Prem Nazir, Ushanandini	A. Vincent	K. Raghavan	
O C T	14	Ramanan	Prem Nazir, Sheela	D. M. Pottekkat	K. Raghavan	
O C T	14	Kunjali Marakkar	Prem Nazir, Sukumari	S. S. Rajan	B. A. Chidambaranath	
O C T	14	Thalirukal	Sathyan, Paul Vengola	M. S. Mani	A. T. Ummer	
O C T	14	Kudumbam	Prem Nazir, Sathyan	M. Krishnan Nair	R. Sudarsanam	
O C T	19	Pareeksha	Prem Nazir, Sharada	P. Bhaskaran	M. S. Baburaj	
O C T	28	Cochin Express	Prem Nazir, Sheela	M. Krishnan Nair	V. Dakshinamoorthy	
N O V	3	Pavappettaval	Sathyan, Kamaladevi	P. A. Thomas	B. A. Chidambaranath	
N O V	8	Pooja	Prem Nazir, Sheela	P. Karamachandran	G. Devarajan	
N O V	11	N.G.O	Sathyan, Sukumari	S. S. Rajan	B. A. Chidambaranath	
N O V	17	Kavalam Chundan	Sathyan, Sharada	J. Sasikumar	G. Devarajan	
N O V	24	Naadan Pennu	Prem Nazir, Sathyan	K. S. Sethumadhavan	G. Devarajan	
D E C	1	Kasavuthattam	Prem Nazir, Sharada	Kunchacko	G. Devarajan	
D E C	7	Chekuthante Kotta	Sathyan, Madhu	M. M. Nesan	B. A. Chidambaranath	
D E C	22	Ollathumathi	Prem Nazir, Sathyan	K. S. Sethumadhavan	L. P. R. Varma	
D E C	22	Paathirapattu	Prem Nazir, Sheela	N. Prakash	Vijaya Bhaskar	
D E C	22	Mulkireedam	Sharada, Adoor Bhasi	N. N. Pisharady	Prathap Singh	
D E C	22	Swapnabhoomi	Prem Nazir, Sathyan	S. R. Puttanna	G. Devarajan	
