= List of Malayalam films of 1966 =

Malayalam films

The following is a list of Malayalam films released in 1966.

Opening		Sl. no.	Film	Cast	Director	Music director	Notes
J A N	21	1	Manikyakottaram	Madhu, Sharada	U. Rajagopal	M. S. Baburaj	
F E B	11	2	Kalithozhan	Prem Nazir, Sheela	M. Krishnan Nair	G. Devarajan	
M A R	4	3	Puthri	Madhu, Shanti	P. Subramaniam	M. B. Sreenivasan	
M A R	11	4	Kusruthykuttan	Master Suresh, Ambika	M. Krishnan Nair	Vijaya Bhaskar	
M A R	19	5	Archana	Madhu, Sharada	K. S. Sethumadhavan	K. Raghavan	
M A R	31	6	Station Master	Sathyan, Ushakumari	P. A. Thomas	B. A. Chidambaranath	
A P R	8	7	Pakalkkinavu	Sathyan, Sharada	S. S. Rajan	B. A. Chidambaranath	
A P R	9	8	Rowdy	Sathyan, Sheela	K. S. Sethumadhavan	G. Devarajan	
A P R	16	9	Pinchuhridhayam	Master Prabha, Ambika	M. Krishnan Nair	V. Dakshinamoorthy	
A P R	22	10	Kadamattathachan	Thikkurissi, Rajasri	K. R. Nambiar, Rt. Rev. Fr. George Thariyan	V. Dakshinamoorthy	
M A Y	14	11	Jail	Sathyan, Sharada	Kunchacko	G. Devarajan	
J U N	17	12	Pennmakkal	Kottarakkara Sridharan Nair, Ambika	J. Sasikumar	M. S. Baburaj	
J U N	30	13	Koottukar	Thikkurissi, Sheela	J. Sasikumar	M. S. Baburaj	
J U L	9	14	Kaattumallika	Gitanjali, Anandan	P. Subramaniam	M. S. Baburaj	
J U L	15	15	Kalyanarathriyil	Prem Nazir, Vijayanirmala	M. Krishnan Nair	G. Devarajan	
J U L	29	16	Kayamkulam Kochunni	Sathyan, Ushakumari	P. A. Thomas	B. A. Chidambaranath	
A U G	19	17	Chemmeen	Madhu, Sheela	Ramu Kariat	Salil Chowdhury	
A U G	27	18	Anarkali	Prem Nazir, K. R. Vijaya	Kunchacko	M. S. Baburaj	
S E P	19	19	Tharavattamma	Sathyan, Sheela	P. Bhaskaran	M. S. Baburaj	
O C T	14	20	Kanakachilanga	Prem Nazir, Sheela	M. Krishnan Nair	G. Devarajan	
O C T	16	21	Kanmanikal	Prem Nazir, Sharada	J. Sasikumar	G. Devarajan	
O C T	28	22	Poochakkanni	Prem Nazir, Vijayanirmala	S. R. Puttanna Kanagal	M. S. Baburaj	
N O V	11	23	Kallipennu	Sathyan, Ushakumari	P. A. Thomas	B. A. Chidambaranath	
N O V	25	24	Karuna	K. P. Ummer, Devika	K. Thankappan	G. Devarajan	
D E C	2	25	Sthanarthy Saramma	Prem Nazir, Sheela	K. S. Sethumadhavan	L. P. R. Varma	
D E C	22	26	Thilothama	Prem Nazir, K. R. Vijaya	Kunchacko	G. Devarajan	
D E C	22	27	Priyathama	Prem Nazir, Sheela	P. Subramaniam	Br Lakshmanan	
D E C	24	28	Mayor Nair	Thikkurissi, Kamladevi	S. R. Puttanna	L. P. R. Varma	
