= List of Malayalam films of 1968 =

The following is a list of Malayalam films released in 1968.

Opening		Sl. no.	Film	Cast	Director	Music director	Notes
J A N	12	1	Viplavakarikal	Madhu, K. V. Shanthi	Mahesh	G. Devarajan	
M A R	8	2	Thirichadi	Prem Nazir, Sheela	Kunchacko	R. Sudarsanam	
M A R	9	3	Vidyarthi	Prem Nazir, Sheela	J. Sasikumar	B. A. Chidambaranath	
M A R	29	4	Karutha Pournami	Madhu, Sharada	Narayanankutty Vallath	M. K. Arjunan	
A P R	10	5	Thokkukal Kadha Parayunnu	Prem Nazir, Sathyan	K. S. Sethumadhavan	G. Devarajan	
A P R	11	6	Viruthan Shanku	Adoor Bhasi, Thikkurissy	P. Venu	B. A. Chidambaranath	
A P R	13	7	Manaswini	Sathyan, Madhu	P. Bhaskaran	M. S. Baburaj	
A P R	26	8	Inspector	Prem Nazir, Adoor Bhasi	M. Krishnan Nair	M. S. Baburaj	
M A Y	3	9	Dial 2244	Prem Nazir, Sukumari	R. M. Krishnaswamy	G. K. Venkatesh	
M A Y	17	10	Vazhi Pizhacha Santhathi	Sathyan, Madhu	O. Ramdas	B. A. Chidambaranath	
M A Y	17	11	Asuravithu	Prem Nazir, Sharada	A. Vincent	K. Raghavan	
M A Y	24	12	Karthika	Sathyan, Sharada	M. Krishnan Nair	M. S. Baburaj	
J U N	20	13	Padunna Puzha	Prem Nazir, Sheela	M. Krishnan Nair	V. Dakshinamoorthy	
J U N	28	14	Hotel High Range	Sharada, Thikkurissi	P. Subramaniam	G. Devarajan	
J U N	30	15	Yakshi	Sharada, Sathyan	K. S. Sethumadhavan	Devarajan	
J U L	12	16	Punnapra Vayalar	Prem Nazir, Sheela	Kunchacko	K. Raghavan	
A U G	1	17	Lakshaprabhu	Prem Nazir, Sheela	P. Bhaskaran	M. S. Baburaj	
A U G	9	18	Kaliyalla Kalyanam	Sathyan, Sharada	A. B. Raj	A. T. Ummer	
A U G	9	19	Love In Kerala	Prem Nazir, Adoor Bhasi	J. Sasikumar	M. S. Baburaj	
A U G	15	20	Kadal	Madhu, Sharada	M. Krishnan Nair	M. B. Sreenivasan	
A U G	30	21	Ezhu Rathrikal	Latha Raju, Jesey	Ramu Kariat	Salil Chowdhary	
A U G	30	22	Thulabharam	Prem Nazir, Sharada	A. Vincent	G. Devarajan	
S E P	13	23	Ragini	Madhu, K. Balaji	P. B. Unni	Alleppey Usman	
S E P	14	24	Midumidukki	Sathyan, Sharada	Crossbelt Mani	M. S. Baburaj	
S E P	27	25	Adhyapika	Madhu, Thikkurissi	P. Subramaniam	V. Dakshinamoorthy	
O C T	11	26	Anchu Sundarikal	Prem Nazir, Jayabharathi	M. Krishnan Nair	M. S. Baburaj	
O C T	25	27	Pengal	Sathyan, T. S. Muthaiah	A. K. Sahadevan	K. V. Job George	
N O V	7	28	Aparadhini	Sathyan, Sharada	P. Bhaskaran	M. B. Sreenivasan	
N O V	22	29	Kodungallooramma	Prem Nazir, K. R. Vijaya	Kunchacko	K. Raghavan	
N O V	29	30	Velutha Kathreena	Prem Nazir, Sathyan	J. Sasikumar	G. Devarajan	
D E C	13	31	Agni Pareeksha	Prem Nazir, Sathyan	M. Krishnan Nair	G. Devarajan	
D E C	19	32	Kayalkkarayil	Prem Nazir, Sheela	N. Prakash	Vijaya Bhaskar	
D E C	19	33	Bharyamar Sookshikkuka	Prem Nazir, Sheela	K. S. Sethumadhavan	V. Dakshinamoorthy	
