= Adoor Bhasi =

Indian actor (1929–1990)

- Born: K. Bhaskaran Nair; 1 March 1929; Peringanadu, Adoor, Travancore, India (present-day Adoor, Kerala)
- Died: 29 March 1990 (aged 61)
- Other name: Bhasi
- Years active: 1953–1990
- Parent(s): E. V. Krishna Pillai; Maheshwari Amma
- Relatives: C. V. Raman Pillai (grandfather)

K. Bhaskaran Nair (1 March 1929 – 29 March 1990), professionally credited by his stage name Adoor Bhasi, was an Indian actor and film director. He was mostly cast as a sidekick to protagonists, particularly Prem Nazir. His comedic roles were widely appreciated in Malayalam films of the 1950s, 1960s, 1970s and 1980s. Bhasi also did leading and character roles. He directed three Malayalam films in the late 1970s. Bhasi is also known for his eloquent speeches in fluent English. He won Kerala State Film Awards, including two Best Actor and one Second Best Actor.

== Early life ==
Adoor Bhasi was born on 1 March 1929 in Peringanadu, Adoor, Travancore. His father, E. V. Krishna Pillai, was a renowned Malayalam humourist writer, dramatist, pioneering short story writer, essayist, lawyer and a Member of the then Travancore Legislative Assembly (MLC). His mother, Maheshwari Amma, was the youngest daughter of C. V. Raman Pillai, one of the major Malayalam novelists, being the first historical novelist in Malayalam and author of Marthanda Varma, Dharmaraja, Premamritham, and Ramarajabahadur, pioneering dramatist, journalist and social activist.

Bhasi was the fourth of the seven children of his parents. His siblings (two sisters and four brothers) were (all late) K. Omana Amma, K. Ramachandran Nair alias Chandraji, Rajalakshmi Amma, K. Padmanabhan Nair, Sankaran Nair, who died young at the age of 18, and K. Krishnan Nair.

His elder brother Chandraji became a film actor much before him. Chandraji entered the Film world of Bollywood and acted in a few Hindi films (Bimal Roy's Parineeta and Hrishikesh Mukherji's films) before moving over with his family to Madras to live with Adoor Bhasi. Chandraji was the manager of RK Studios owned by Raj Kapoor in Mumbai and has acted as villain in the popular Bollywood film Ashique alongside Raj Kapoor. Chandraji then acted in several Malayalam films like Chithram and became well known as an actor. His nephew, B. Harikumar, is a well-known novelist, satirist and actor in Malayalam and has acted in several TV serials and feature films.

Bhasi spent his childhood along with his parents in Trivandrum. He had his primary education in a missionary school—Vadakkekottaaram—in the capital city. After his father's premature death at the age of 44, Bhasi, along with his mother and siblings moved to his father's native village of Adoor and had his middle and high school studies in the English High School of Adoor. After his school education, he moved over to Trivandrum and lived with his maternal aunt. He then joined the Institute of Textile Technology and passed the professional course of diploma in Textile Chemistry. He did not attend any college for graduation. After acquiring the diploma, he was to do internship in a textile mill in Coimbatore in Tamil Nadu, but owing to financial difficulties, he could not pursue the prescribed internship. He then worked as an apprentice in the Lakshmi Textiles factory in Trivandrum, but could not secure a job in any textile mill in Travancore. He stayed put in Trivandrum and while staying with his eldest maternal aunt, B. Gourikutty Amma, for more than 12 years in Rosscote Bungalow, the house built by his maternal grandfather, C. V. Raman Pillai, began acting on the amateur stage and taking part in dramas broadcast by All India Radio, Thiruvananthapuram station, along with leading stage actors of the time, like C. I. Parameswaran Pillai, Kainikkara Kumara Pillai, P. K. Vikraman Nair, T. R. Sukumaran Nair, Jagathy N. K. Achary, Nagavally R. S. Kurup, Thikkurissy Sukumaran Nair, P. K. Veeraraghavan Nair alias Veeran, T. N. Gopinathan Nair, Aranmula Ponnamma, Mavelikara Ponnamma, and Pattom Saraswathi Amma.

During those twelve years, he also worked as the Manager of P. K. Memorial Press run by the well-known playwright, T. N. Gopinathan Nair, and also worked as the Manager of Sakhi weekly, edited by T. N. Gopinathan Nair, Rosscote Krishna Pillai and Kavalam Narayana Panicker. His friendship with T. N. earned for him many close contacts with writers and artistes in the professional world of Malayalam drama and films. That ultimately secured for him entry into the amateur stage and finally to the Malayalam film world.

== Career ==
Bhasi got his first chance in a small role in a Malayalam feature film, Thiramala, directed by P. R. S. Pillai. His first notable film was Chandrathara's Mudiyanaya Puthran (1961). In the year 1968, he acted in Viruthan Shanku, the first full-length comedy in Malayalam cinema by P. Venu. He went on to become one of the highly sought-after and inalienable actors and celebrities of Malayalam feature films of the 1960s and 1970s. He, along with S. P. Pillai and Bahadur formed the trio that contributed to rollicking comedy scenes in Malayalam films. Bhasi went on to act in over 700 films, mainly in supporting roles. He acted with almost all leading actors in Malayalam in his period, like Sathyan, Prem Nazir, Madhu, K. P. Ummer, Jayan, M. G. Soman, Sukumaran, Mammootty and Mohanlal.

He acted as the villain in Karimbana and Itha Oru Manushyan. He did double roles in Kottaram Vilkkanundu, Bhadradeepam and Lankadahanam. He got his first Kerala State Film Award for best actor in 1974 for Chattakkari. He first acted as hero in John Abraham's Cheriyachante Kroorakrithyangal (1978) and got the Kerala State Film Award for best actor in 1979. Later in 1984, he won the Kerala State Film Award for best actor for his performance in 18 April (1983). A memorial to Adoor Bhasi is being built by the District Panchayat of Pathanamthitta, the foundation stone for which was laid on 12 June 2009.

Adoor Bhasi is often considered one of the first film makers in South India to recognize the potential of Kamal Haasan as a leading actor. He was cast as lead in his movie Adiyapadam.

== Death ==
Bhasi suffered from various health problems like diabetes and hypertension during his last years. He also suffered from kidney disease. Being a lifelong bachelor, he did not have any family support. The death of his co-star Prem Nazir in January 1989 shattered him very much. Nazir was Bhasi's co-star in many films. Finally, he died on 29 March 1990, aged 61. His death occurred on the eve of his father's 52nd death anniversary. He was cremated with full state honours at his home in Adoor.

== Awards ==
Kerala State Film Awards:

- 1974: Best Actor – Chattakkari (directed by K. S. Sethumadhavan)
- 1979: Best Actor – Cheriyachante Kroorakrithyangal (directed by John Abraham)
- 1984: Second Best Actor – 18 April (directed by Balachandra Menon)

Filmfare Awards South:

- 1976: Best Actor – Raagam

== Filmography ==
=== As actor ===
Note: The list may be incomplete

==== 1950s ====
Year	Title	Role	Notes
1953	Thiramala		

==== 1960s ====
Year	Title	Role	Notes
1961	Mudiyanaaya Puthran	Krishnan Nair	
1961	Jnaanasundari	Michael	
1962	Viyarppinte Vila	Anthony	
1962	Veluthambi Dalawa	Mallan Pillai	
1962	Bhagyajathakam		
1963	Sathyabhama		
1963	Ninamaninja Kaalpaadukal	Subramaniyam Potti	
1963	Moodupadam		
1963	Chilamboli		
1963	Ammaye Kaanaan	Sangameshwara Iyer	
1964	Thacholi Othenan	Vanan Ambu	
1964	School Master	Appunni Nair	
1964	Oral Koodi Kallanayi	Panikkar	
1964	Kuttikkuppayam	Chekunju	
1964	Kudumbini	Kelu Nair	
1964	Karutha Kai	Soman	
1964	Kalanjukittiya Thankam	K.P. Nair	
1964	Devaalayam		
1964	Bharthavu		
1964	Bhargavi Nilayam	Cheriya Pareekanni	
1964	Atom Bomb	Butlar	
1964	Althaara		
1964	Aadyakiranangal	Krishnan Ashan	
1965	Thommante Makkal		
1965	Thankakudam		
1965	Shyamala Chechi		
1965	Shakuntala		
1965	Sarpakadu	Compounder Unni	
1965	Rajamalli		
1965	Porter Kunjali	Aboobakkar Mullakka	
1965	Pattuthoovaala	Dr. Gregory	
1965	Odayil Ninnu	Velu	
1965	Muthalali		
1965	Murappennu	Shanku	
1965	Mayavi	Bhasi	
1965	Kochumon	Maathu	
1965	Kavyamela	Vikraman	
1965	Kattuthulasi		
1965	Kattupookkal	Pankan	
1965	Kathirunna Nikah	Mammali	
1965	Kalyana Photo		
1965	Kadathukaran	Kala Velu	
1965	Jeevithayaathra	Madhavan	
1965	Inapraavugal		
1965	Devata		
1965	Chettathi	Bhargavan	
1965	Bhoomiyile Malakha	Pothen	
1965	Ammu	Achummaavan	
1966	Tilottama		
1966	Tharavattamma	Paramu Kuruppu	
1966	Sthanarthi Saramma	Sasthrikal	
1966	Station Master		
1966	Rowdy		
1966	Priyathama		
1966	Poochakkanni		
1966	Pinchuhridhayam		
1966	Pakalkkinavu	Krishnankutty	
1966	Mayor Nair		
1966	Kusruthykuttan		
1966	Koottukar		
1966	Kayamkulam Kochunni	Ochira Pachupilla	
1966	Karuna		
1966	Anarkali	Karim	
1966	Kanmanikal		
1966	Kanakachilanka		
1966	Kalyana Rathriyil	Appukuttan	
1966	Kallipennu		
1966	Kalithozhan	Unnithan	
1966	Jail		
1966	Iruttinte Athmavu	Guru Kunjichaathu	
1966	Archana	Bhasi	
1967	Kunjali Marakkar		
1967	Udhyogastha		
1967	Swapnabhoomi		
1967	Sahadharmini		
1967	Ramanan	Poojari	
1967	Postman		
1967	Pavappettaval	Manager	
1967	Collector Malathy	Kittunni	
1967	Pareeksha	Ayappan Pilla	
1967	N.G.O		
1967	Nagarame Nandi		
1967	Naadan Pennu	Ummukka	
1967	Mynatharuvi Kolakase		
1967	Madatharuvi		
1967	Kudumbam		
1967	Kottayam Kolacase		
1967	Kavalam Chundan		
1967	Kasavuthattam	Khader	
1967	Kaanatha Veshangal		
1967	Jeevikkan Anuvadikku		
1967	Cochin Express	Unnikannan Nair	
1967	Chithramela		Segment: Penninte Prapancham
1967	Bhagyamudra		
1967	Awal		
1967	Ashwamedham	Manthravadi	
1967	Anweshichu Kandethiyilla	Korappachayan	
1967	Agniputhri	Parvathidas	
1968	Yakshi	Ananthan	
1968	Viruthan Shanku		
1968	Velutha Kathreena	Kuriachan	
1968	Vazhi Pizhacha Santhathi		
1968	Thulabharam	Achuthan Nair	
1968	Thirichadi	Anthappan	
1968	Punnapra Vayalar	Gopalji	
1968	Padunna Puzha	Pachu Pilla, Dakshyayani, Mother	
1968	Midumidukki	Padmanabha Kurup	
1968	Manaswini		
1968	Love in Kerala	Kunjunni	
1968	Lakshaprabhu		
1968	Kodungallooramma	Chinese Merchant	
1968	Viruthan Shanku	Vikraman/Shanku	
1968	Kayalkkarayil		
1968	Karthika	Mathai	
1968	Kaliyalla Kalyanam		
1968	Inspector		
1968	Dial 2244		
1968	Bharyamar Sookshikkuka	S R Poduval	
1968	Asuravithu	Kuttan Nair	
1968	Aparadhini		
1968	Anchu Sundarikal		
1968	Agni Pareeksha	Unni	
1969	Kattukurangu		
1969	Virunnukari	Swami	
1969	Vilakuranja Manushyan		
1969	Vilakkapetta Bendhangal		
1969	Veettu Mrugam		
1969	Soosi	Dallal Lazar	
1969	Sandhya		
1969	Rest House	K. R. Das/Beetle	
1969	Rahasyam	Sankaran	
1969	Padichakallan		
1969	Nadi	Lazer	
1969	Mister Kerala		
1969	Mooladhanam	Kuruppu	
1969	Koottukudumbam	Kollam Raghavan	
1969	Kannoor Deluxe	Chandu Nair	
1969	Kadalpalam	Nanukuttan Nair	
1969	Jwala	Menon	
1969	Kallichellamma	Kesheva Pilla	
1969	Danger Biscuit	Swami	
1969	Anaachadanam		
1969	Adimakal	Giridhara Yogi/Naanu Kurup	
1969	Aalmaram		

==== 1970s ====
Year	Title	Role	Notes
1970	Vivahitha	Ramayya	
1970	Vivaham Swargathil		
1970	Mindapennu	Das	
1970	Vazhve Mayam	Achuthan Nair	
1970	Thriveni	Purushu	
1970	Thara	Velu Pilla	
1970	Stree		
1970	Saraswathi	Nadanarangan	
1970	Rakthapushpam	Burma Nanappan	
1970	Priya		
1970	Pearl View	Henry	
1970	Palunku Pathram		
1970	Othenente Makan	Naduvazhi	
1970	Moodalmanju	Lonappan	
1970	Lottery Ticket	Lottery Menon/Bhaskara Menon	
1970	Kuttavali	Kesavan	
1970	Kurukshethram		
1970	Kalpana	Nanu	
1970	Kakkathamburatti	Kuttappan	
1970	Ezhuthatha Kadha	Bhaskaran Pillai	
1970	Dathuputhran	Jose's father	
1970	Cross Belt	Sahasram Iyyer	
1970	Bheekara Nimishangal	Ranger James	
1970	Aranazhika Neram	Sivarama Kurup	
1970	Anadha		
1970	Ammayenna Sthree	Sanku Pilla	
1970	Ambalapravu	Shankara Pilla	
1970	Nilakkatha Chalanangal		
1970	Aa Chithrashalabham Parannotte	Sankarankutty	
1971	Vithukal	Eravan Nair	
1971	Vilakku Vangiya Veena	S. R. Menon	
1971	Vidhyarthikale Ithile Ithile		
1971	Ummachu		
1971	Shiksha	Krishna Pilla	
1971	Oru Penninte Katha	Unnithan	
1971	Makane Ninakku Vendi	Kruvilla	
1971	Neethi		
1971	Moonnupookkal		
1971	Marunnattil Oru Malayali	Narasimham	
1971	Line Bus	Koodan Govinda Pilla	
1971	Lanka Dahanam	Kondotti Moosathu, Mathai	
1971	Karakanakadal		
1971	Sarasayya	Poulose	
1971	Inqulab Zindabbad	Panjali Raman Nair	
1971	Anubhavangal Paalichakal	Rajappan	
1971	C.I.D. Nazir	Bhasi	
1971	Achante Bharya	Karunakaran Nair	
1971	Aabhijathyam	Chandi	
1972	Theerthayathra	Pavithran Namboothiri	
1972	Taxi Car	Nambiar/Bhasi	
1972	Snehadeepame Mizhi Thurakku		
1972	Sambhavami Yuge Yuge	Velu	
1972	Sakthi		
1972	Saathi		
1972	Puthrakameshti		
1972	Pushpanjali	Pachupilla	
1972	Punarjanmam	Narayana Panikkar	
1972	Postmane Kananilla	Hidumban	
1972	Oru Sundariyude Katha	Unthuvandi Krishnankutty	
1972	Omana	Cheriyachan	
1972	Nrithasala	Paachu	
1972	Naadan Premam	Khader Mappila	
1972	Miss Mary	Sankaran	
1972	Mayiladumkunnu	Mathan	
1972	Maaya	Raghuvaran Pillai	
1972	Maravil Thirivu Sookshikkuka	Kaduva Kurien	
1972	Maram	Bappootti	
1972	Manushyabandhangal	Kumaran	
1972	Manthrakodi	Karnnadhanan	
1972	Kandavarundo		
1972	Kalippava		
1972	Iniyoru Janmam Tharu		
1972	Gandharavakshetram	Thekkedam Thirumeni	
1972	Devi		
1972	Chembarathi	Bhasi	
1972	Brahmachari	Veeramarthandan Pilla	
1972	Azhimukham		
1972	Aromalunni		
1972	Anweshanam		
1972	Ananthasayanam		
1972	Achanum Bappayum	Madhavan	
1972	Aaradimanninte Janmi	Philipose Muthalaali	
1973	Veendum Prabhatham	Sasi	
1973	Urvashi Bharathi		
1973	Udayam	Ready Krishna Pilla	
1973	Thottavadi	Dr. Pushpangadathan	
1973	Thiruvabharanam		
1973	Thenaruvi	Raman Nair	
1973	Thekkan Kattu	Gopalan	
1973	Thaniniram	Viswambharan	
1973	Soundaryapooja		
1973	Sasthram Jayichu Manushyan Thottu	Ramakrishnan	
1973	Raakuyil		
1973	Prethangalude Thazhvara		
1973	Poymughangal		
1973	Ponnapuram Kotta		
1973	Police Ariyaruthe		
1973	Pavangal Pennungal		
1973	Panchavadi	Samson	
1973	Padmavyooham	Pathrose	
1973	Pacha Nottukal	Thommi Aashaan	
1973	Nakhangal	Jose	
1973	Masappady Mathupillai		
1973	Manushyaputhran	Ammunni	
1973	Manassu		
1973	Maram	Bappootti	
1973	Madhavikutty		
1973	Ladies Hostel	Bharathan	
1973	Kavitha		
1973	Kaliyugam		
1973	Kaapalika	Pothachan/Peter	
1973	Kalachakram	Kochukuttan	
1973	Ithu Manushyano		
1973	Interview	Velu Pilla	
1973	Football Champion	K. B. K. Nair	
1973	Enippadikal		
1973	Divyadharsanam	Kolappan	
1973	Dhriksakshi		
1973	Dharmayudham	Godhavarma Thampuran	
1973	Darsanam		
1973	Chukku	Mathayichan	
1973	Chenda		
1973	Chaayam		
1973	Bhadradeepam	Devarajan Potti/Unni Swami	
1973	Angathattu	Karuppan	
1973	Ajnathavasam	Minnal	
1973	Achani	Kaimal	
1973	Aaradhika	Seitu	
1974	Uttarayanam	Adhikari	
1974	Thumbolarcha	Bidananthan	
1974	Thacholi Marumakan Chandu	Kandacheri Chappan	
1974	Swarnavigraham		
1974	Suprabhatham		
1974	Shapamoksham		
1974	Sethubandhanam	Unnithan	
1974	Sapthaswaragal	Prathapan	
1974	Rahasyarathri	Padmaraj	
1974	Rajahamsam	Driver Krishnankutty	
1974	Poonthenaruvi	Ummachan	
1974	Pattabhishekam	Bhasi	
1974	Pancha Thanthram	Krishnankutty	
1974	Oru Pidi Ari		
1974	Night Duty	Padmanabha Panikkar	
1974	Nellu	Nanu	
1974	Neelakannukal	Udakku Velu	
1974	Nathoon		
1974	Nagaram Sagaram		
1974	Nadeenadanmare Avasyamundu		
1974	Manyasree Viswamithran	Sankaran	
1974	Durga	Johny	
1974	College Girl	Sukumaran	
1974	Checkpost		
1974	Chattakkari	Morris	
1974	Chandrakantham	Dr. Jacob	
1974	Chanchala		
1974	Chakravakam	Sankaran	
1974	Bhoomidevi Pushpiniyayi	Sankara Menon	
1974	Ayalathe Sundari	Gopal/Palgo	
1974	Aswathy		
1974	Arakkallan Mukkalkkallan	Aruvikkara Thampy/Mukkalkallan	
1974	Alakal		
1975	Velicham Akale		
1975	Ullasa Yaathra		
1975	Tourist Bunaglow		
1975	Thaamarathoni		
1975	Thiruvonam	Abimanyu	
1975	Swarnna Malsyam		
1975	Chattambikkalyaani	Shareeram Kuttappan	
1975	Sooryavamsham		
1975	Sammanam		
1975	Raagam	Vishwanatha Menon	
1975	Sindhu	Venu	
1975	Pravaham	Chandran	
1975	Picnic	A. B. Menon	
1975	Pennpada	Bhaskara Pillai	
1975	Palaazhi Madhanam		
1975	Padmaragam		
1975	Omanakkunju		
1975	Neela Ponman	Kutty	
1975	Mucheettukalikkarante Makal	Ponkurishu Thoma	
1975	Mattoru Seetha		
1975	Manishada	Moosa	
1975	Makkal		
1975	Madhurappathinezhu		
1975	Love Marriage	Menon	
1975	Love Letter		
1975	Kuttichaathan		
1975	Kottaaram Vilkkaanundu		
1975	Kalyana Sougandhikam		
1975	Hello Darling	Padmarajan	
1975	Dharmakshetre Kurukshetre		
1975	Criminals		
1975	Chuvanna Sandhyakal		
1975	Chumaduthangi		
1975	Chief Guest		
1975	Cheenavala	Pappu	
1975	Boy Friend		
1975	Babu Mon	Balagopal	
1975	Alibabayum 41 Kallanmaarum	Kasim	
1975	Abhimaanam	Appukuttan Nair	
1975	Ayodhya	M. K. Muthalali	
1975	Aaranya Kaandum		
1976	Yudhabhoomi		
1976	Yakshagaanam	P. K. Panikkar	
1976	Vazhivilakku		
1976	Vanadevatha	Kunju	
1976	Sexilla Stundilla		
1976	Seemantha Puthran		
1976	Raathriyile Yaathrakkaar		
1976	Rajayogam		
1976	Pushpasharam		
1976	Priyamvada		
1976	Prasaadam	Dr. Chandran	
1976	Ponni	Bomman	
1976	Pick Pocket	Achu	
1976	Panchami	Gangan	
1976	Paarijatham		
1976	Ozhukkinethire		
1976	Neeyente Lahari		
1976	Neela Sari		
1976	Muthu		
1976	Mohiniyaattam	Krishnan	
1976	Maanasaveena		
1976	Mallanum Mathevanum		
1976	Light House	Chandu	
1976	Kaayamkulam Kochunniyude Makan		
1976	Kanyaadaanam		
1976	Kamadhenu	Sreekumaran	
1976	Dweepu		
1976	Chottanikkara Amma	Pandarapadi Kamadevan	
1976	Chennaaya Valarthiya Kutty		
1976	Ayalkkaari	Fernandez	
1976	Appooppan	Vishwanatha Menon	
1976	Anubhavam	Varkey	
1976	Amrithavaahini	Vinod	
1976	Ammini Ammaavan	Bhaskarankutty	
1976	Amma		
1976	Ajayanum Vijayanum	Rajappan	
1976	Abhinandanam	Govindan	
1977	Vyaamoham		
1977	Yatheem	Musaliyar	
1977	Vishukkani	Kurup	
1977	Veedu Oru Swargam		
1977	Varadhakshina		
1977	Thuruppu Gulam		
1977	Tholkan Enikku Manassilla		
1977	Sujatha		
1977	Sooryakanthi		
1977	Sneham		
1977	Sukradasa		
1977	Satyavan Savithri		
1977	Samudram	Easwara Pilla	
1977	Rathimanmadhan	Dassapan	
1977	Randu Lokam	Keshava Kurup	
1977	Parivarthanam	Mathew	
1977	Panchamrutham		
1977	Nurayum Pathayum		
1977	Nirakudam	Dharmapalan	
1977	Naalumanippookkal		
1977	Muttathe Mulla	Kochappan	
1977	Mohavum Mukthiyum		
1977	Mini Mol		
1977	Makam Piranna Manka		
1977	Lakshmi	Shankharanarayanan	
1977	Kannappanunni	Thankakudam	
1977	Kaduvaye Pidicha Kiduva		
1977	Itha Ivide Vare	Nanu	
1977	Guruvayur Kesavan	Achuthan Nair	
1977	Chathurvedam		
1977	Chakravarthini		
1977	Bhaaryaavijayam		
1977	Aparaajitha		
1977	Anjali		
1977	Ammaayi Amma		
1977	Akshayapaathram		
1977	Akale Aakaasham		
1977	Aadhya Paadam		
1977	Achaaram Ammini Osharam Omana	Kittu Pilla	
1978	Yagaswam	Gopala Pilla	
1978	Vadakakku Oru Hridayam		
1978	Theerangal		
1978	Thamburatti	Thampuran	
1978	Snehathinte Mukhangal	Sarasappan	
1978	Sathrusamhaaram		
1978	Raghuvamsham		
1978	Rathi Nirvedham		
1978	Ona Pudava		
1978	Nivedhyam	Kamsan Panikkar	
1978	Nakshathrangale Kaaval		
1978	Mattoru Karnan		
1978	Mannu	Supran Thirumeni	
1978	Madanolsavam	Frederick March	
1978	Kudumbam Namukku Sreekovil	Sukumaran	
1978	Kanalkattakal	Arjunan	
1978	Kalpavriksham	Judo/Ajayan	
1978	Kadathanaattu Maakkam	Siddhan	
1978	Jayikkaanaay Janichavan	Tharakan	
1978	Jalatharangam		
1978	Ithaa Oru Manushyan	Padmanabha Kurup	
1978	Gaandharvam		
1978	Ee Ganam Marakkumo		
1978	Bhaaryayum Kaamukiyum		
1978	Bandhanam		
1978	Balapareekshanam	Ramesh	
1978	Aval Viswasthayayirunnu	Avarachan	
1978	Ashokavanam		
1978	Anubhoothikalude Nimisham		
1978	Adimakkachavadam	Velayudan	
1978	Aarum Anyaralla	Vareed	
1978	Aanappaachan	Beeran Kaakka	
1979	Ward No. 7		
1979	Vellayani Paramu	Abdu	
1979	Thuramukham	Asan	
1979	Rakthamillatha Manushyan	Ramalinga Chettiyar	
1979	Prabhu	Siddhan	
1979	Allauddinum Albhutha Vilakkum	Muhammed Hussain	
1979	Manushyan		
1979	Kaumarapraayam		
1979	Kathirmandapam		
1979	Cheriyachante Kroorakrithyangal	Cheriyachan	

==== 1980s ====
Year	Title	Role	Notes
1980	Rajaneegandhi	Krishna Menon	
1980	Naayattu	Joseph	
1980	Meen		
1980	Karimpana	Sayippu	
1980	Kalika	Vasu	
1980	Ethikkara Pakky	Supramuthayyan	
1980	Dwik Vijayam	Kannappan	
1980	Anthappuram	Nair	
1980	Ammayum Makalum	Gopalan	
1980	Aagamanam	Samuel	
1981	Theekkali	Bahuleyan	
1981	Thakilu Kottampuram	Kunjunni Kurup	
1981	Saahasam		
1981	Paathira Sooryan	Pappachan	
1981	Kodumudikal	Vasukuttan Pilla	
1981	Kallan Pavithran	Merchant/Trader	
1981	Irattimadhuram	Thorappan Panikkar	
1981	Ellaam Ninakku Vendi	Panikkar	
1981	Munnettam	Gopalan Nair	
1981	Kadathu	School Principal	
1982	Vidhichathum Kothichathum		
1982	Snehapoorvam Meera	Panikkar	
1982	Oru Kunju Janikkunnu		
1982	Ormakkayi	Fernandes	
1982	Olangal		
1982	Nagamadathu Thampuratti	Thamburan	
1982	Mylanji	Hameed Sayivu	
1982	Mathruka Kudumbam		
1982	Koritharicha Naal		
1982	Keni	Girija Vallabha Menon	
1982	Aasha	Willy	
1982	Kattile Pattu	Raghavan Pilla	
1982	Jambulingam		
1982	Ilakkangal		
1982	Irattimadhuram	Thorappan Panikkar	
1982	Gaanam		
1982	Ente Mohangal Poovaninju	Easwaran	
1982	Enikkum Oru Divasam	Ouseph	
1982	Chiriyo Chiri		
1982	Chillu	Annie's father	
1983	Sandhya Vandanam	Charumoottil Kuruppu	
1983	Sandhyakku Virinja Poovu	Panikkarammavan	
1983	Rugma	Bhatt	
1983	Pinnilavu	Padmanabha Pillai	
1983	Oomakkuyil		
1983	Onnu Chirikku	Krishnan Nair	
1983	Nanayam		
1983	Maniyara	Shameer's father	
1983	Mahabali		
1983	Kuyiline Thedi	Ganapathi Iyer	
1983	Justice Raja	Adv. Sharma	
1983	Iniyengilum	Parakkal Mathai	
1983	Himavaahini	Watcher	
1983	Guru Dakshina		
1983	Ente Katha	Govinda Kuruppu	
1983	Engane Nee Marakkum		
1983	Belt Mathai	Pokker	
1983	Ashtapadi		
1983	Aadyathe Anuraagam	Janardhanan Pilla	
1983	Aadhipathyam	Sankara Pilla	
1983	Aaroodam	Gopalan Nair	
1983	Eenam		
1984	Vetta		
1984	Vepraalam	Godfather	
1984	Kilikkonjal	Menon	
1984	Thathamme Poocha Poocha	Gonsalves	
1984	Swanthamevide Bandhamevide	Bhaskara Menon	
1984	Paavam Poornima	Chellappan Pilla	
1984	Onnanu Nammal	Padmanabhan Nair	
1984	Muthodu Muthu	Prabhakaran Pillai	
1984	Manithali	Abdullakunjikka	
1984	Lakshmana Rekha	Radha's father	
1984	Koottinilamkili	Valiya Kurup	
1984	Jeevitham		
1984	Itha Innu Muthal	T. P. Bhaskaran Nair	
1984	Ethirppukal		
1984	Ente Kalithozhan		
1984	Idavelakku Sesham	Adv. Swami	
1984	Swantham Sarika	Krishnan Nair	
1984	Athirathram	Lona	
1984	April 18	Policeman's father-in-law	
1984	Aalkkoottathil Thaniye	Achuthan	
1985	Vellam	Kunjunni	
1985	Principal Olivil	Sub Inspector	
1985	Pacha Velicham	Station Master Muhammed	
1985	Orikkal Oridathu	Kaimal	
1985	Nerariyum Nerathu	Bhaskara Kurup	
1985	Mulamoottil Adima	Shivaswami	
1985	Madhu Vidhurathri		
1985	Aanakkorumma	Raman Nair	
1985	Ee Thanalil Ithiri Nerum	Vijayan's uncle	
1985	Avidathe Pole Ivideyum		
1985	Eeran Sandhya	Poulose	
1985	Manya Mahajanangale	Vakachan	
1985	Angadikkappurathu	Lazar	
1985	Yathra	Priest	
1986	Vaiki Odunna Vandi		
1986	Rajavinte Makan	Priest	
1986	Iniyum Kurukshetrum	Govinda Pillai	
1986	Kaveri	Raman Nair	
1986	Adukkan Entheluppam	San Diego	
1986	Nandi Veendum Varika	Vishnu Nampoothiri	
1986	Padayani		
1986	Rakkuyilin Ragasadassil	Ragan Vaidyanathan	
1986	Kochu Themmadi	Headmaster	
1987	Poovizhi Vasalile	Father Joseph Stephen	Tamil film
1987	Kilippattu		
1987	Sarvakalashala	College Principal	
1987	Irupatham Noottandu	Varma	
1987	Purushartham		
1987	Bhoomiyile Rajakkanmar	Thekkumkoor Valiya Thampuran	
1987	Kalam Mari Katha Mari	Musthafa	
1987	Idanazhiyil Oru Kaalocha		
1987	Ivide Ellavarkkum Sukham	Thampuran	
1987	Manivatharile Aayiram Sivarathrikal	Neena's uncle	
1988	Rahasyam Parama Rahasyam	Chathunni	
1988	Evidence	Adv. Chidambaram	
1989	Chakkikotha Chankaran	Madhava Menon	

==== 1990s ====
Year	Title	Role	Notes
1991	Ragam Anuragam	Xavier	

=== As director ===
- Reghu Vamsam (1978)
- Acharam Ammini Osaram Omana (1977)
- Aadhya Paadam (1977)

=== As playback singer ===
- "Kaduva..." - Maravil Tirivu Sookshikkuka
- "Oru Roopa Nottu Koduthal..." - Lottery Ticket (1970)
- "Thallu Thallu..." - Abhijatyam
- "Thalassery..." - Kannur Deluxe
- "Kuruvi petti", "Vottilla Vottilla..." - Sthanarthi Saramma
- "Velutha Vavinum..." with K. J. Yesudas and P. Suseela - Chakravakam
- "Neeya Saranam..." - Thekkan Kattu
- "Manyanmare..." - Sakthi
- "Pankaja Dala Nayane...", "Irattathookkam..." - Kattukurangu
- "Anachal Chanda..." - Adya Kiranam
- "Kallupaalathil Kariyaachan..." - Aadyakiranangal (1964)
- "Manjulabhaashini Baale..." - Aadyakiranangal (1964)
- "Kannoor Dharmadam..." - Aadyakiranangal (1964)
- "Shanka Vittu Varunnallo..." - Aadyakiranangal (1964)
- "Car Lorreel Keri..." - Aadyakiranangal (1964)
- "Zindabaad Zindabaad..." - Sthaanaarthi Saramma (1966)
- "Kaduvappetti..." - Sthaanaarthi Saramma (1966)
- "Utharamadhuraapuri..." - Kaattukurangu (1969)
- "Kallukulangare..." - Kaattukurangu (1969)
- "Shyaamalam Graamaranga..." - Kaattukurangu (1969)
- "Chinchilam Chiluchilam..." - Vidyarthikale Ithile Ithile (1972)
- "Oshaakali..." - Chaayam (1973)
- "Velutha Vavinum..." - Chakravaakam (1974)
- "Naanam Maraykkaan..." - Swarnnavigraham (1974)
- "Angaadi Marunnukal..." - Amrithavaahini (1976)
- "Chora Thilaykkum Kaalam..." - Raghuvamsham (1978)
- "Kokkarakko Paadum..." - Onappudava (1978)
- "Ikkaanunna Kettitadhil" [Bit]... - Thuramukham (1979)
- "Enaakshiyaarival" [Bit]... - Thuramukham (1979)

=== Lyrics ===
- "Angaadi Marunnukal..." Amrithavaahini (1976)
