= Kadamattathachan =

Kadamattathachan may refer to:

- Kadamattathu Kathanar (fl. 9th century), Syriac Orthodox priest in Kerala folklore
- Kadamattathachan (1966 film), a Malayalam film of 1966
- Kadamattathachan (1984 film), a Malayalam film of 1984
