= Vazhi Pizhacha Santhathi =

- Directed by: O. Ramdas
- Written by: M. Parameswaran Nair
- Screenplay by: M. Parameswaran Nair
- Produced by: O. Ramdas
- Starring: Sathyan; Madhu; Kaviyoor Ponnamma; Adoor Bhasi
- Cinematography: P. B. Mani
- Edited by: Ceylon Mani
- Music by: B. A. Chidambaranath
- Production company: Rama Das Pictures
- Distributed by: Rama Das Pictures
- Release date: 17 May 1968
- Country: India
- Language: Malayalam

Vazhi Pizhacha Santhathi (transl. The Wayward Offspring) is a 1968 Indian Malayalam-language film, directed and produced by O. Ramdas. The film stars Sathyan, Madhu, Kaviyoor Ponnamma and Adoor Bhasi. The film had musical score by B. A. Chidambaranath.

== Cast ==
- Sathyan
- Madhu
- Kaviyoor Ponnamma
- Adoor Bhasi
- Thikkurissy Sukumaran Nair
- Muthukulam Raghavan Pillai
- Sankaradi
- T. R. Omana
- Ambika
- C. I. Paul
- K. P. Ummer
- Kamaladevi
- M. Parameswaran
- M. S. Namboothiri
- Prathapan

== Soundtrack ==
The music was composed by B. A. Chidambaranath and the lyrics were written by P. Bhaskaran.

No.	Song	Singers	Lyrics	Length (m:ss)
1	"Alliyaambal Poovu"	P. Leela	P. Bhaskaran	
2	"Hari Krishna Krishna"	P. Jayachandran, P. Leela, B. Vasantha, Sreelatha Namboothiri, B. Savithri	P. Bhaskaran	
3	"Olathil Ozhukunna"	K. J. Yesudas	P. Bhaskaran	
4	"Pankajadalanayane"	P. Jayachandran, P. Leela, B. Vasantha, Sreelatha Namboothiri, B. Savithri	P. Bhaskaran	
5	"Thaarunyappoykayil"	P. Leela	P. Bhaskaran	
