= Kalippava =

- Directed by: A. B. Raj
- Written by: A. Sheriff
- Screenplay by: A. Sheriff
- Starring: Sathyan; Kaviyoor Ponnamma; Adoor Bhasi; Thikkurissy Sukumaran Nair
- Cinematography: T. N. Krishnankutty Nair
- Edited by: B. S. Mani
- Music by: B. A. Chidambaranath
- Production company: Panthiyil Films
- Distributed by: Panthiyil Films
- Release date: 26 May 1972
- Country: India
- Language: Malayalam

Kalippava is a 1972 Indian Malayalam-language film, directed by A. B. Raj. The film stars Sathyan, Kaviyoor Ponnamma, Adoor Bhasi and Thikkurissy Sukumaran Nair. The film had musical score by B. A. Chidambaranath. The plot centers around mental health and follows a protagonist trying to care for his sister, who suffers from mental illness.

== Cast ==
- Sathyan
- Kaviyoor Ponnamma
- Adoor Bhasi
- Thikkurissy Sukumaran Nair
- Ambika
- K. P. Ummer
- Vijayanirmala

== Soundtrack ==
The music was composed by B. A. Chidambaranath and the lyrics were written by Sugathakumari.

No.	Song	Singers	Lyrics	Length (m:ss)
1	"Kadalum Malayum"	B. Vasantha	Sugathakumari	3:12
2	"Neela Neela Vaanamatha"	S. Janaki, M. Balamuralikrishna	Sugathakumari	3:30
3	"Olam Kunjolam"	S. Janaki	Sugathakumari	3:20
4	"Thaamarappoove"	S. Janaki	Sugathakumari	2:10
