= Kalanjukittiya Thankam =

- Directed by: S. R. Puttanna
- Written by: Cholamalai; Ponkunnam Varkey (dialogues)
- Screenplay by: Ponkunnam Varkey
- Starring: Sathyan; Ambika; Adoor Bhasi; Thikkurissy Sukumaran Nair
- Cinematography: Shanmugham
- Music by: G. Devarajan
- Production company: Savithri Pictures
- Distributed by: Savithri Pictures
- Release date: 27 November 1964
- Running time: 143 min
- Country: India
- Language: Malayalam

Kalanjukittiya Thankam (The Stolen Gold) is a 1964 Indian Malayalam-language film, directed by S. R. Puttanna. The film stars Sathyan, Ambika, Adoor Bhasi and Thikkurissy Sukumaran Nair. The film had a musical score by G. Devarajan. The movie is a remake of the 1962 Kannada movie Gaali Gopura.

== Cast ==
- Sathyan as Sugathan
- Ambika as Girija
- Adoor Bhasi as KP Nair
- Thikkurissy Sukumaran Nair as Bhaskara Pillai
- P. J. Antony as Kuttan Nair
- Vasanthi as Hema
- Adoor Pankajam as Pankajam
- Aranmula Ponnamma as Sarada
- Bahadoor as K Ramachandran Maithanam
- T. K. Balachandran as Madhu
- Sukumari as Amminikkutty Amma
- T. S. Muthaiah as Unnithan
- Muttathara Soman
- Shylashri

== Soundtrack ==
The music was composed by G. Devarajan and the lyrics were written by Vayalar Ramavarma.

No.	Song	Singers	Lyrics	Length (m:ss)
1	"Bhoomi Kuzhichu"	P. B. Sreenivas	Vayalar Ramavarma	
2	"Evide Ninno"	K. P. Udayabhanu	Vayalar Ramavarma	
3	"Kainiraye Valayitta"	K. J. Yesudas, P. Susheela	Vayalar Ramavarma	
4	"Kalithozhi Kanaka"	K. J. Yesudas	Vayalar Ramavarma	
5	"Parayunnellaarum"	Mehboob, Shantha P. Nair	Vayalar Ramavarma	
6	"Penkodi Penkodi"	P. Susheela, A. M. Rajah	Vayalar Ramavarma	
