= Sahadharmini =

- Directed by: P. A. Thomas
- Written by: P. A. Thomas; S. L. Puram Sadanandan (dialogues)
- Screenplay by: S. L. Puram Sadanandan
- Produced by: P. A. Thomas
- Starring: Sathyan; Kaviyoor Ponnamma; Adoor Bhasi; Hari
- Cinematography: P. B. Maniyam
- Edited by: T. R. Sreenivasalu
- Music by: B. A. Chidambaranath
- Production company: Thomas Pictures
- Distributed by: Thomas Pictures
- Release date: 3 February 1967
- Country: India
- Language: Malayalam

Sahadharmini is a 1967 Indian Malayalam film directed, produced and co-written by P. A. Thomas. The film stars Sathyan, Kaviyoor Ponnamma, Adoor Bhasi and Hari in the lead roles, and has a musical score composed by B. A. Chidambaranath.

== Cast ==
- Sathyan
- Kaviyoor Ponnamma
- Adoor Bhasi
- Hari
- Muthukulam Raghavan Pillai
- O. Ramdas
- T. R. Omana
- Shaji
- Pankajavalli
- Ushakumari

== Soundtrack ==
The music was composed by B. A. Chidambaranath and the lyrics were written by Vayalar Ramavarma.

No.	Song	Singers	Lyrics	Length (m:ss)
1	"Aalolam"	S. Janaki, P. Leela	Vayalar Ramavarma	03:06
2	"Bhoomikku Neeyoru Bhaaram"	K. J. Yesudas	Vayalar Ramavarma	03:24
3	"Chaanchakkam"	S. Janaki	Vayalar Ramavarma	02:46
4	"Himagiri"	P. Leela	Vayalar Ramavarma	03:26
5	"Naanichu Naanichu"	B. Vasantha	Vayalar Ramavarma	03:29
6	"Paarijaathamalare"	B. Vasantha	Vayalar Ramavarma	01:22
7	"Shilpikale Shilpikale"	B. Vasantha	Vayalar Ramavarma	03:14
