= Vasanthi (actress) =

Indian actress and producer

- Born: Karanam Vasanthi; Thimmasamudram, Prakasam district
- Died: 29 May 2019; Anna Nagar, Chennai
- Other names: Vasanti, Vasanthi B. A.
- Occupations: Actress, Producer
- Years active: 1957–1978
- Spouse: P. Seenivasan (deceased on 2012)
- Children: 1 Daughter

Vasanthi B. A. (born as Karanam Vasanthi) was an Indian actress and producer who was active in the Tamil, Telugu, Malayalam and Kannada film industries during the latter half of the 20th century. She was well known for her second heroine and supporting roles in some movies.

== Personal life ==
Vasanthi married P. Seenivasan, a politician of the Dravida Munnetra Kazhagam and member of the Tamil Nadu Legislative Assembly. She died on May 29, 2019, at her residence in Anna Nagar, Chennai. She was looked after by her daughter and sister's son.

== Film career ==
Vasanthi made her debut in Telugu movie Mahakavi Kalidasu in 1960. Her Tamil debut was Then Nilavu in 1961. She also acted as second heroine opposite M. G. Ramachandran in Maadappura. Vasanthi entered the tinsel world as a well educated woman, an uncommon thing for heroines of her days (1960s). Tall, lanky and endowed with big eyes, Vasanthi acted in mostly decent characters and left a homely girl's image.

== Filmography ==
This list is incomplete; you can help by expanding it.

=== As Actress ===
Year	Film	Role	Language	Notes
1957	Minnaminugu		Malayalam	Debut Film
1960	Mahakavi Kalidasu	Goddess Kalika	Telugu	
1961	Then Nilavu	Lalitha	Tamil	
1961	Kannterudu Nodu		Kannada	
1961	Virisina Vennela		Telugu	
1962	Siri Sampadalu	Latha	Telugu	
1962	Manchi Manasulu	Jaya	Telugu	
1962	Dakshayagnam		Telugu	
1962	Maadappura	Vasantha	Tamil	
1962	Azhagu Nila		Tamil	
1962	Dakshayagnam		Tamil	
1962	Avana Ivan	Jamuna	Tamil	
1962	Bale Pandiya		Tamil	
1962	Vidhi Vilasa		Kannada	
1962	Sreerama Pattabhishekam	Seeta/Ahalya	Malayalam	
1963	Punarjanma	Vasanthi	Telugu	
1963	Anuragam		Telugu	
1963	Savati Koduku		Telugu	
1963	Ammaye Kaanaan	Rema	Malayalam	
1964	Sabhash Suri		Telugu	
1964	Navagraha Pooja Mahima		Telugu	
1964	Gudi Gantalu	Subhadra	Telugu	
1964	Vivaha Bandham	Aruna	Telugu	
1964	Kalanjukittiya Thankam		Malayalam	
1964	Bommai		Tamil	
1965	Aatma Gowravam	Parwati	Telugu	
1965	Keelu Bommalu		Telugu	
1965	Sumangali	Uma	Telugu	
1965	Uyyala Jampala		Telugu	
1965	Ennathan Mudivu		Tamil	
1965	Sarasa B.A.		Tamil	
1965	Mavana Magalu		Kannada	
1966	Palnati Yuddham	Perini Devi	Telugu	
1966	Mangalasutram	Kamala	Telugu	
1966	Chilaka Gorinka	Saraswati	Telugu	
1966	Srimathi		Telugu	
1966	Pakalkkinavu		Malayalam	
1966	Tharavattamma		Malayalam	
1967	Sati Sumathi	Sita	Telugu	
1968	Veera Pooja		Telugu	
1968	Veeranjaneya	Urmila	Telugu	
1970	Mruthyu Panjaradalli Goodachari 555		Kannada	
1971	Anugraha		Kannada	
1972	Hrudaya Sangama		Kannada	
1973	Beesida Bale		Kannada	
1974	Veeranjaneya Kathe		Kannada	
1976	Pallavi		Kannada	
1978	Snehikkan Oru Pennu		Malayalam	

=== As producer ===
1. Memu Manushulame (1973) – Telugu
2. Bhale Papa (1971) – Telugu
