= Mayor Nair =

- Poster
- Directed by: S. R. Puttanna
- Screenplay by: S. R. Puttanna
- Based on: The Mayor of Casterbridge by Thomas Hardy
- Produced by: P. A. Thangal
- Starring: Adoor Bhasi; Thikkurissy Sukumaran Nair; Balu; Ramesh
- Cinematography: R. N. K. Prasad
- Edited by: V. P. Krishnan
- Music by: L. P. R. Varma
- Production company: Kalpana Productions
- Release date: 24 December 1966
- Country: India
- Language: Malayalam

Mayor Nair is a 1966 Indian Malayalam-language film, directed by S. R. Puttanna and produced by P. A. Thangal. The film stars Adoor Bhasi, Thikkurissy Sukumaran Nair, Balu and Ramesh. It is an adaptation of Thomas Hardy's 1886 novel The Mayor of Casterbridge. The film was released on 24 December 1966.

== Cast ==
- Adoor Bhasi
- Thikkurissy Sukumaran Nair
- Balu
- Ramesh
- Kalpana
- Kamaladevi
- Kerala Gopi
- Kottarakkara Sreedharan Nair
- Meena
- P. A. Thangal
- Santha Devi

== Soundtrack ==
The music was composed by L. P. R. Varma and the lyrics were written by Vayalar Ramavarma.

| Song | Singers |
|---|---|
| "Indrajaalakkaara" | L. R. Eeswari |
| "Mudiniraye Pookkalumaay" | S. Janaki, P. Jayachandran |
| "Thottaal Pottunna Praayam" | K. J. Yesudas |
| "Vaanampaadi Vaanampaadi" | S. Janaki, P. Jayachandran |
| "Vaishaakha Pournami" | P. Jayachandran |
| "Varnapushpangal" | S. Janaki, P. Jayachandran, L. P. R. Varma |
