= Kaanatha Veshangal =

- Directed by: M. Krishnan Nair
- Written by: K. P. Kottarakkara
- Screenplay by: K. P. Kottarakkara
- Produced by: K. P. Kottarakkara
- Starring: Prem Nazir; Sheela; Sukumari; Jayabharathi
- Edited by: M. Umanath
- Music by: B. A. Chidambaranath
- Production company: Ganesh Pictures
- Distributed by: Ganesh Pictures
- Release date: 11 August 1967
- Country: India
- Language: Malayalam

Kaanatha Veshangal (transl. Unseen Guises) is a 1967 Indian Malayalam-language film directed by M. Krishnan Nair and produced by K. P. Kottarakkara. The film stars Prem Nazir, Sheela, Sukumari and Jayabharathi in the lead roles and features a musical score by B. A. Chidambaranath.

== Cast ==
- Prem Nazir
- Sheela
- Sukumari
- Jayabharathi
- Adoor Bhasi
- G. K. Pillai
- K. P. Ummer
- Miss Kumari

== Soundtrack ==
The music was composed by B. A. Chidambaranath and the lyrics were written by Vayalar Ramavarma.

No.	Song	Singers	Lyrics	Length (m:ss)
1	"Akkareyikkare"	L. R. Eeswari, B. Vasantha	Vayalar Ramavarma	
2	"Innalathe Pennallallo"	P. Jayachandran, B. Vasantha	Vayalar Ramavarma	
3	"Kadaloru Sundarippennu"	L. R. Eeswari, B. Vasantha	Vayalar Ramavarma	
4	"Nale Veettil"	P. Leela, B. Vasantha	Vayalar Ramavarma	
5	"Paalkadal Naduvil"	K. J. Yesudas, P. Leela, J. M. Raju	Vayalar Ramavarma	
6	"Swargavaathil Thurannu"	K. J. Yesudas	Vayalar Ramavarma	
