= Viruthan Shanku =

- Directed by: P. Venu
- Screenplay by: Sathya
- Story by: Karyattu Achutha Menon
- Produced by: P. K. Sathyapal
- Starring: Adoor Bhasi; Thikkurissy; Kottarakkara; Ambika sukumaran Jayabharathi
- Cinematography: Krishnankutty
- Edited by: K. D. George
- Music by: B. A. Chidambaranath
- Production company: Associated Pictures
- Release date: 11 April 1968
- Country: India
- Language: Malayalam

Viruthan Shanku is a 1968 Indian Malayalam-language comedy film directed by P. Venu, starring Adoor Bhasi and Ambika. It revolves around Vikraman, and how he tricks people and steals their valuables in a comic way and also how he wins the heart of Kunjikkavu.

== Plot ==
The film starts with Vikraman returning home from Madras after completing his studies. On reaching his ancestral home, he learns that his elder brother has moved out after marrying a young woman and is now under the control of his mother-in-law. He is also controlling all the wealth of his family, leaving their sister, who is a widow, and her three daughters in poverty. Vikraman goes and asks his brother for money, but he refuses to give them any. Vikraman files a suit for their share in the property. Vikraman is married and his wife and young son are at his wife's house. He goes to visit them. Meanwhile, his wife and child are attacked by a dacoit. In the resultant struggle, she is pushed from the attic by the dacoit and the child is abducted for the gold he is wearing. She dies in the arms of Vikraman, who has just arrived. He got a broken piece of a tiger's claw belonging to the dacoit as evidence, which broke during the struggle. Soon Vikraman learns that he is affected with tuberculosis and leaves home, carrying his gun, in order to save his sister and her daughters from the disease. He falls unconscious in the forest and is saved by the tribals. His disease is cured by them using their traditional medicines. On regaining health, Vikraman kills an elephant which had been troubling the tribals. To save the tribals from the Forest officials, Vikraman left them and ventured deep into the jungle. There he is caught by the dacoits, and from the broken tiger's claw in the pendant of a dacoit, Vikraman recognises the one who killed his wife and abducted his child. He is taken before the chief of the dacoits with whom Vikraman's child is safe. Vikraman told him all that happened in his life and how his men ruined his life. The chief ordered his trusted lieutenant to investigate whether Vikraman is telling the truth. Based on the investigation, the chief realised that his gang member actually is responsible for the death of Vikraman's wife and expelled him from the gang. But, since Vikraman is aware of their hideout, he didn't let Vikraman return with his child. Instead he asked him to join their gang and prove that he is trustworthy so that he can release his child. Vikraman accepted the offer and joined the gang.

Vikraman was asked to prove himself as a smart thief by the chief. He also directed his men to observe Vikraman. Vikraman started to trick people by using various disguises. He disguised himself as an old Brahmin, a washerman, a cloth seller, etc. He stole a diamond ring, expensive silk clothes, a gold necklace, a bicycle, a horse and more. He adopted the name "Shanku". Meanwhile, the dacoits visited Vikraman's elder brother and punished him for not caring for his sister and family and make him promise to take care of them in the future. He understood his mistake and returned to his sister and family to look after them. Shanku went to the house of a senior advocate and tricked his wife and his sister Kunjikkavu and stole their gold chain, silk clothes and even their house key. Shanku on seeing Kunjikkavu instantly fell in love with her. Even though fooled, Kunjikkavu developed and admiration towards Shanku and gradually fell in love. Shanku successfully completed his task and the dacoit chief let Shanku return his son back to his home. After that, Shanku returned all the items he stole to their respective owners. Then, Shanku disguised himself as a Carnatic music teacher and took up the role of Kunjikkavu's music teacher. Even Kunjikkavu didn't realise that the teacher is Shanku. Meanwhile, he tried to understand Kunjikkavu's mind and told her his life story. Hearing all that, Kunjikkavu told Shanku that she too loves him. Then an old and rich Brahmin came to marry Kunjikkavu. Her brother and sister in law agreed for the proposal even though Kunjikkavu sternly opposed it. In the meantime, the expelled dacoit shot the chief and tried to take over as the chief of the gang. But Shanku brought the injured chief to the scene and he killed the rebel dacoit. Before he dies, the chief proclaims Shanku the new chief. But Shanku wants the dacoits to lead a normal life and dissolved the gang. Then Shanku with the help of fellow dacoits threatened the groom and made him flee to Kasi. Then Shanku as music teacher stepped in and offered to marry Kunjikkavu to avoid the embarrassment of having the marriage cancelled. But, Kunjikkavu opposed this proposal also and announced openly that she will only marry Shanku. Then Shanku removed the disguise of the music teacher and revealed who he is. In the end, with the consent and blessing of all their relatives, Shanku and Kunjikkavu got married.

== Cast ==
- Adoor Bhasi as Vikraman/Shanku
- Thikkurissy Sukumaran Nair as Menon
- Kottarakkara Sreedharan Nair as Ukkannan Unni Nair
- Ambika Sukumaran as Kunjikkavu
- Jayabharathi as Kamakshi
- Shankaradi as Naanu
- Muthukulam Raghavan Pillai as Forest Officer
- Balan C. A. as Vettakkaran Abdulla Sahib
- Panjabi as Hanuman Pandaram Swami
- Kottayam Santha as Naanukuttyamma
- P. K. Sathyapal as Chief of the dacoits
- T. K. Balachandran as Kittunnu
- Kaduvakulam Antony as Krishnan
- Pappukkutty Bhagavathar as Chithran Namboothiri
- T. R. Omana as Kalyani
- Meenakumari as Bhargavi
- Vanchiyoor Radha as Kumudam
- Khadeeja as Ichikkavu
- Aranmula Ponnamma as Kunjulakhsmi
- Sukumari as Parukuttyamma
- C. R. Parthiban as Son-in-law of old Brahmin (Diamond ring, Tamil-speaking)
- P. A. Thomas as Velu Menon
- Thodupuzha Radhakrishnan as Kunjikrishna Panikkar

== Soundtrack ==
The music is given by B. A. Chidambaranath. The lyrics are by P. Bhaskaran. The background score is given by Joseph Krishna.

| No | Title | Singer(s) |
|---|---|---|
| 1 | Aaraamamullakale | P. Leela |
| 2 | Innuvarum Achan | P. Leela |
| 3 | Jananiyum Janakanum | P. Leela, A. P. Komala |
| 4 | Pushpangal Choodiya | K. J. Yesudas, P. Leela |
| 5 | Vannaan vannallo hey vannan vannallo | K. J. Yesudas |
| 6 | Varunnu Pokunnu Vazhipokkar | K. J. Yesudas |
