= Station Master (1966 film) =

- Directed by: P. A. Thomas
- Written by: Ambadi Gopalakrishnan; S. L. Puram Sadanandan (dialogues)
- Produced by: P. A. Thomas
- Starring: Prem Nazir; Sathyan; Adoor Bhasi; Hari
- Music by: B. A. Chidambaranath; M. A. Majeed
- Production company: Thomas Pictures
- Distributed by: Thomas Pictures
- Release date: 31 March 1966
- Country: India
- Language: Malayalam

Station Master is a 1966 Indian Malayalam drama film, directed and produced by P. A. Thomas. The film stars Prem Nazir, Sathyan, Adoor Bhasi and Hari in the lead roles. The music was composed by B. A. Chidambaranath and M. A. Majeed.

== Plot ==
The plot follows Venu, a dedicated station master who makes every sacrifice to educate his younger brother, Madhu. After Madhu loses his eyesight in a railway parcel office fire, he secretly breaks off his relationship with his lover, Geetha, to spare her from a difficult future. Unaware of their past romance, Venu later steps in to marry a helpless Geetha out of goodwill, inadvertently bringing his brother's former lover into their home as his new bride. This triggers a complex web of silent emotional turmoil until Madhu's eyesight is eventually restored.

== Cast ==
- Prem Nazir
- Sathyan
- Adoor Bhasi
- Hari
- T. R. Omana
- K. P. Ummer
- Kaduvakulam Antony
- Kamaladevi
- Prathapan
- Ushakumari

== Soundtrack ==
The music was composed by B. A. Chidambaranath and M. A. Majeed, with lyrics written by P. Bhaskaran.

No.	Song	Singers	Lyrics	Length (m:ss)
1	"Jeevithanaadakavedi"	S. Janaki	P. Bhaskaran	
2	"Kalpana" (Sad)	K. J. Yesudas	P. Bhaskaran	
3	"Kalpanathan Alakaapuriyil"	K. J. Yesudas, B. A. Chidambaranath	P. Bhaskaran	
4	"Kalyaanam Kalyaanam"	Zero Babu	P. Bhaskaran	
5	"Konnathayyinu"	B. Vasantha	P. Bhaskaran	
6	"Oru Thulasi"	S. Janaki	P. Bhaskaran	
7	"Pandorikkal"	S. Janaki	P. Bhaskaran	
