= Pinchuhridhayam =

- Directed by: M. Krishnan Nair
- Written by: Thilak; S. L. Puram Sadanandan (dialogues)
- Produced by: T. E. Vasudevan
- Starring: Prem Nazir; Kaviyoor Ponnamma; Adoor Bhasi; Muthukulam Raghavan Pillai
- Music by: V. Dakshinamoorthy
- Production company: Jaya Maruthi
- Distributed by: Jaya Maruthi
- Release date: 16 April 1966
- Country: India
- Language: Malayalam

Pinchuhridhayam (transl. An Tender Heart) is a 1966 Indian Malayalam-language film, directed by M. Krishnan Nair and produced by T. E. Vasudevan. The film stars Prem Nazir, Kaviyoor Ponnamma, Adoor Bhasi and Muthukulam Raghavan Pillai. The film was scored by V. Dakshinamoorthy.

== Cast ==
- Prem Nazir
- Kaviyoor Ponnamma
- Adoor Bhasi
- Muthukulam Raghavan Pillai
- Sankaradi
- T. S. Muthaiah
- Ambika
- Master Prabha
- Master Rameshkanna

== Soundtrack ==
The music was composed by V. Dakshinamoorthy with lyrics by P. Bhaskaran.

No.	Song	Singers	Lyrics	Length (m:ss)
1	"Akaleyakale Alakaapuriyil"	L. R. Eeswari	P. Bhaskaran	
2	"Ambaadikkuttaa"	Renuka	P. Bhaskaran	
3	"Atham Pathinu"	L. R. Eeswari	P. Bhaskaran	
4	"Gaanavum Layavum Neeyalle"		P. Bhaskaran	
5	"Kattakkidaavaaya" (Devakiyasode)	P. Leela	P. Bhaskaran	
6	"Mallaakshee Manimoule"	P. Leela, A. P. Komala	P. Bhaskaran	
7	"Seetha Naadakam" (Kankavarum Kamini)	Renuka, Aruna	P. Bhaskaran	
