= The Mayor of Casterbridge =

1886 novel by Thomas Hardy

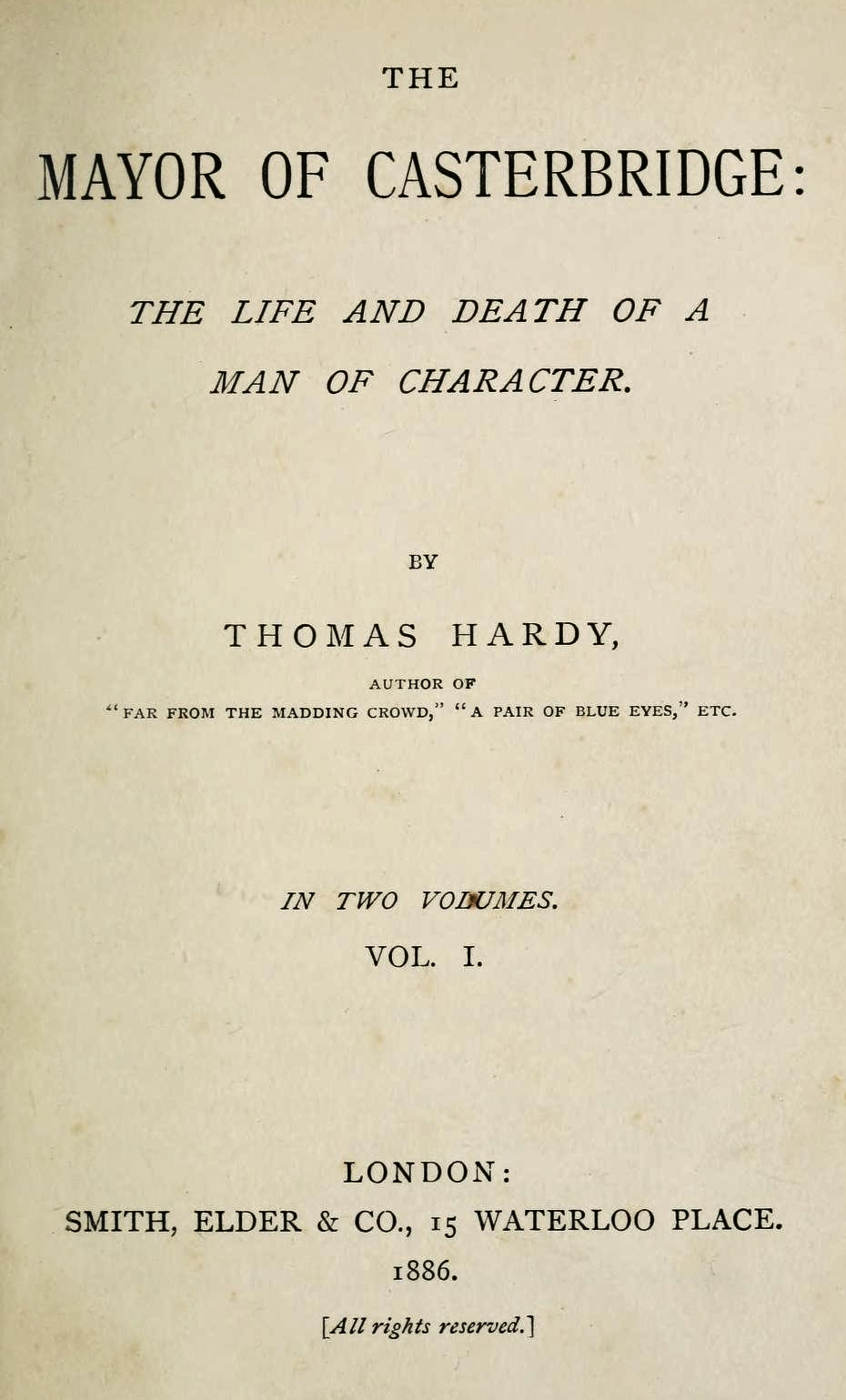
- First edition title page
- Author: Thomas Hardy
- Illustrator: Robert Barnes
- Language: English
- Genre: Novel
- Published: London
- Publisher: Smith Elder & Co
- Publication date: 1886
- Publication place: United Kingdom
- Preceded by: Two on a Tower
- Followed by: The Woodlanders
- Text: The Mayor of Casterbridge at Wikisource
- First published in two volumes

The Mayor of Casterbridge: The Life and Death of a Man of Character is an 1886 novel by the English author Thomas Hardy. One of Hardy's Wessex novels, it is set in a fictional rural England with Casterbridge standing in for Dorchester in Dorset where the author spent his youth. It was first published as a weekly serialisation from January 1886.

The novel is considered to be one of Hardy's masterpieces, although it has been criticised for incorporating too many incidents, a consequence of the author trying to include something in every weekly published instalment.

== Plot ==
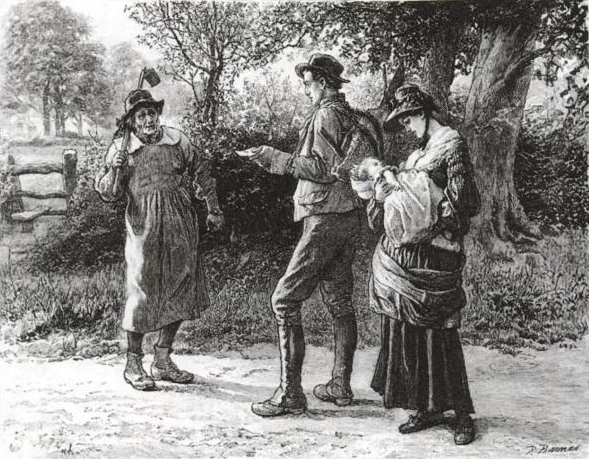
Henchard on the way to the fair with Susan and Elizabeth-Jane

At a country fair at Weydon Priors in Wessex, Michael Henchard, a 21-year-old hay-trusser, argues with his wife Susan. Drunk on rum-laced furmity he auctions her off, along with their baby daughter Elizabeth-Jane, to Richard Newson, a sailor, for five guineas. Sober and remorseful the next day, he is unable to find his family. He vows not to touch liquor again for 21 years.

Believing the auction to be legally binding, Susan lives as Newson's wife for 18 years. After Newson is lost at sea, Susan, lacking any means of support, decides to seek out Henchard again, taking her daughter with her. Susan has told Elizabeth-Jane little about Henchard, and the young woman knows only that he is a relation by marriage. Susan discovers that Henchard has become a very successful hay and grain merchant and mayor of Casterbridge, known for his staunch sobriety. He has avoided explaining how he lost his wife, allowing people to assume he is a widower.

When the couple are reunited, Henchard proposes remarrying Susan after a sham courtship, this in his view being the simplest and most discreet way to remedy matters and to prevent Elizabeth-Jane learning of their disgrace. To do this, however, he is forced to break off an engagement with a woman named Lucetta Templeman, who had nursed him when he was ill.

Donald Farfrae, a young and energetic Scotsman passing through Casterbridge, helps Henchard by showing him how to salvage substandard grain he has bought. Henchard takes a liking to the man, persuades him not to emigrate, and hires him as his corn factor, rudely turning away a man named Jopp to whom he had already offered the job. Farfrae is extremely successful in the role, and increasingly outshines his employer. When he catches the eye of Elizabeth-Jane, Henchard dismisses him and Farfrae sets himself up as an independent merchant. Farfrae conducts himself with scrupulous honesty, but Henchard is so determined to ruin his rival that he makes risky business decisions that prove disastrous.

Susan falls ill and dies shortly after the couple's remarriage, leaving Henchard a letter to be opened on the day of Elizabeth-Jane's wedding. Henchard reads the letter, which is not properly sealed, and learns that Elizabeth-Jane is not in fact his daughter, but Newson's – his Elizabeth-Jane having died as an infant. Henchard's new knowledge causes him to behave coldly towards the second Elizabeth-Jane.

Elizabeth-Jane accepts a position as companion to Lucetta, a newcomer, unaware that she has had a relationship with Henchard which resulted in her social ruin. Now wealthy after receiving an inheritance from her aunt, and learning that Henchard's wife had died, Lucetta has come to Casterbridge to marry him. However, on meeting Farfrae, she becomes attracted to him, and he to her.

Henchard's financial difficulties persuade him that he should marry Lucetta quickly. But she is in love with Farfrae, and the couple run away one weekend to get married, not telling Henchard until after the fact. Henchard's credit collapses and he goes bankrupt. Farfrae buys Henchard's old business and tries to help Henchard by employing him as a journeyman.

Lucetta asks Henchard to return her old love letters, and Henchard asks Jopp to take them to her. Jopp, who still bears a grudge for having been cheated out of the position of factor, opens the letters and reads them out loud at an inn. Some of the townspeople publicly shame Henchard and Lucetta, creating effigies of them in a skimmington ride. Lucetta is so devastated by the spectacle that she collapses, has a miscarriage, and dies.

The next day, Newson – who it transpires was not lost at sea – arrives at Henchard's door asking about his daughter. Henchard, who has come to value her kindness to him, is afraid of losing her companionship and tells Newson she is dead. Newson leaves in sorrow. After 21 years, Henchard's vow of abstinence expires, and he starts drinking again.

Eventually discovering that he has been lied to, Newson returns, and Henchard disappears rather than endure a confrontation. On the day of Elizabeth-Jane's wedding to Farfrae, Henchard comes back, timidly seeking a reconciliation. She rebuffs him, and he departs for good. Later, regretting her coldness, she and Farfrae set out to find him. They arrive too late, and learn that he has died alone. They also find his last written statement: his dying wish is to be forgotten.

== Principal characters ==
- Michael Henchard: hay trusser who becomes mayor of Casterbridge
- Susan Henchard (Newson): wife of Henchard, sold to Newson
- Richard Newson: sailor; purchases Susan and lives with her for many years as her de facto husband
- Elizabeth-Jane I: daughter of Susan by Henchard; dies as an infant
- Elizabeth-Jane II: daughter of Susan by Newson; marries Farfrae
- Donald Farfrae: becomes Mayor of Casterbridge after Henchard; Scotsman
- Lucetta Templeman (Le Sueur): native of Jersey who has an affair with Henchard; marries Farfrae
- Joshua Jopp: sometime manager with a grudge against Henchard.

== Setting and date ==
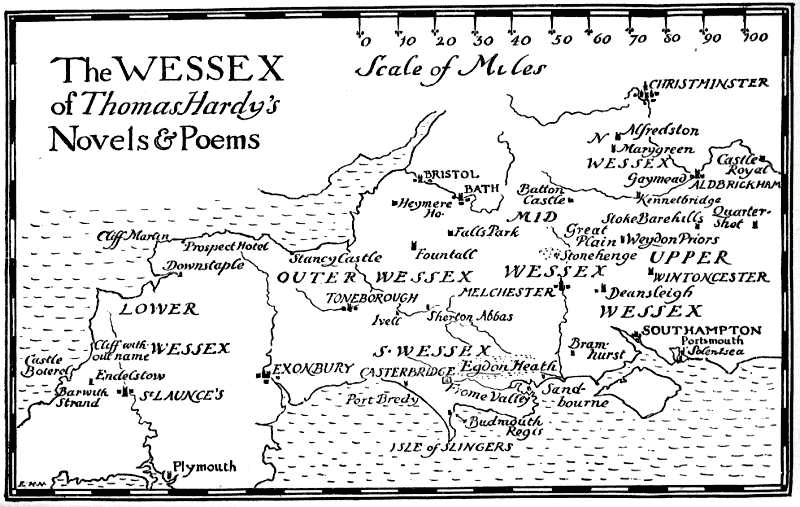
Locations in Wessex, from The Wessex of Thomas Hardy by Bertram Windle, 1902, based on correspondence with Hardy.

The book is one of Hardy's Wessex novels, and is set largely in the fictional town of Casterbridge, based on Dorchester in Dorset. The author intended Casterbridge to be an imaginative presentation of certain aspects of the town as he remembered it in the "dream" of his childhood.

Although the opening sentence of the novel states that the events described took place "before the nineteenth century had reached one-third of its span" the date of Hardy's own childhood places it rather later – in the mid-to-late 1840s.

=== Inspiration ===
The concept of a man selling his wife was not new in Hardy's era. His story is set in the first half of the 19th century, when various newspapers reported instances of men selling their wives. For example, in Huddersfield on 19 August 1806, a tradesman named Gledhill accepted half a guinea (equivalent to £42.68 in 2025) for his "young and beautiful" wife and "delivered her to the purchaser at the Market Cross before a great concourse of people", "who wished the purchaser good luck of his bargain". In October 1830 a Sheffield man sold his wife in the market at Rotherham for three pence (equivalent to £1.19 in 2025). In 1849 a more complex sale-of-wife story came to light on Hardy's patch, in Dorset. Around 1830 one Simon Mitchell sold his wife for £2 (equivalent to £197.51 in 2025).

== First publication and early reception ==
Hardy started work on The Mayor of Casterbridge in the spring of 1884, after a three-year pause. He completed it in a little over a year, and it was first issued in weekly parts in January 1886, followed by full publication in May 1886. A reader for the publisher, Smith, Elder & Co. was not impressed and complained that the lack of gentry among the characters made it uninteresting. It was issued with a small print run of only 750 copies.

Hardy himself felt that in his efforts to get an incident into almost every weekly instalment he had added events to the narrative somewhat too freely, resulting in over-elaboration. However, he was deeply affected, telling a friend that the novel was the only tragedy that made him weep while writing it.

== Later appreciation ==
In her 2006 biography of Thomas Hardy, the author Claire Tomalin called the book a masterpiece, a deeply imagined dramatic and poetic work, with a narrative on a grand scale and paced with extraordinary moments. She praised it as being built on the territory in which Hardy worked best, in which the rural landscape is drawn with a naturalist's eye and in which country people play out their lives between custom and education, work and ideas, and love of place and experience of change. Hardy's portrait of Henchard – "depressive, black-tempered, self-destructive, and also lovable as a child is lovable" – she considered one of his strongest achievements. She did concur with Hardy, however, in noting that he tried to pack in too many incidents.

== Adaptations ==
=== Film and TV ===
- The Mayor of Casterbridge, a silent film of 1921
- Mayor Nair, a 1966 Indian Malayalam film
- Daag, a 1973 Bollywood romantic drama film
- Vichitra Jeevitham, a 1978 remake of Daag
- The Mayor of Casterbridge, a 1978 seven-part serial for BBC TV
- The Claim, a 2000 film set in the American West with events loosely based on the novel
- The Mayor of Casterbridge, a 2003 British TV film

=== Radio ===
- The Mayor of Casterbridge, a 1994 four-part dramatisation by Sally Hedges with David Calder as Michael Henchard, Jason Flemyng as Donald Farfrae, Janet Dale as Susan, Andrea Wray as Elizabeth-Jane, Sandra Berkin as Lucetta, Mary Wimbush as the Furmity-seller and John Nettles as Newson.
- The Mayor of Casterbridge, a 2008 three-part radio play by Helen Edmundson for BBC Radio 4's Classic Serial slot.

=== Opera ===
- The Mayor of Casterbridge, a 1951 opera by the young British composer Peter Tranchell, with a libretto by Tranchell and Peter Bentley. It received its first performance at that year's Cambridge Festival, and was revived in 1959 (with minor revisions) by the Cambridge University Opera Group, conducted by Guy Woolfenden and produced by David Byram-Wigfield.

== Bibliography ==
- Webb, A. P. (1916). A Bibliography of Thomas Hardy 1865-1915. London: Frank Hollings.
- Tomalin, Claire (2006). Thomas Hardy: The Time-Torn Man. London: Viking (Penguin Books). ISBN 978-0-670-91512-5.
