= Pavappettaval =

- Directed by: P. A. Thomas
- Screenplay by: Muthukulam Raghavan Pillai
- Story by: K. Ramnoth
- Starring: Sathyan; Kamaladevi; Sukumari; Adoor Bhasi
- Cinematography: P. K. Madhavan Nair
- Edited by: Ceylon Mani
- Music by: B. A. Chidambaranath
- Production company: Movie Masters
- Release date: 3 November 1967
- Country: India
- Language: Malayalam

Pavappettaval is a 1967 Indian Malayalam-language film, directed by P. A. Thomas. The film stars Sathyan, Kamaladevi, Sukumari and Adoor Bhasi. The film had musical score by B. A. Chidambaranath. It is a remake of the 1941 Telugu film Devatha.

== Plot ==
After completing his Bar-at-Law degree in England, Gopi returns to his native village in India. His family, including his mother Bhavani Amma and sister Radha, are overjoyed. Gopi becomes infatuated with Lakshmi, their family servant. He takes advantage of her vulnerability and promises to marry her before leaving for the city . Later when Lakshmi's father attempts to arrange her marriage, Lakshmi refuses and leaves her house. In a desperate attempt to restore stability, Bhavani Amma sends Gopi to bring Lakshmi back into their lives.

== Cast ==
- Sathyan as Gopi
- Kamaladevi as Lakshmi
- Sukumari
- Adoor Bhasi as Balaramaiah
- Hari
- Muthukulam Raghavan Pillai as a marriage broker
- O. Ramdas as Venkaiah
- Sreelatha Namboothiri as Padma
- Aranmula Ponnamma as Bhavani Amma, mother of Gopi and Radha
- C. I. Paul
- Khadeeja
- Kumari Rajam
- Miss Kerala (Rani Chandra)
- N. Govindankutty
- S. P. Pillai as Pappu
- Vidhubala as Radha, sister of Gopi

== Soundtrack ==
The music was composed by B. A. Chidambaranath with lyrics by P. Bhaskaran, Kedamangalam Sadanandan and M. K. R. Paattyath.

No.	Song	Singers	Lyrics
1	"Ambili Maama"	P. Leela	P. Bhaskaran
2	"Daivam Njangalkkenthinu"	Renuka	Kedamangalam Sadanandan
3	"Jeevithamennathu"	B. Vasantha	M. K. R. Paattyath
4	"Ninmukham Kandappol"	B. Vasantha	P. Bhaskaran
5	"Ormavenam"		P. Bhaskaran
6	"Sharanamayyappaa Sharanamayyappaa"	P. Leela, B. Vasantha, Latha Raju, B. Savithri	P. Bhaskaran
7	"Vrindaavaniyil"	K. J. Yesudas, P. Leela	P. Bhaskaran

== Reception ==
The film was a critical and commercial failure; historian B. Vijayakumar believes this was due to its lack of "artistic and technical brilliance" and miscasting.
