= Kalyana Rathriyil =

- Poster
- Directed by: M. Krishnan Nair
- Written by: Thankom Movies; S. L. Puram Sadanandan (dialogues)
- Produced by: M. Raju Mathan
- Starring: Prem Nazir; Adoor Bhasi; Muthukulam Raghavan Pillai; T. S. Muthaiah
- Music by: G. Devarajan
- Production company: Thankam Movies
- Release date: 15 July 1966
- Country: India
- Language: Malayalam

Kalyana Rathriyil (transl. On the wedding night) is a 1966 Indian Malayalam-language crime thriller film directed by M. Krishnan Nair and produced by M. Raju Mathan. The film stars Prem Nazir, Adoor Bhasi, Muthukulam Raghavan Pillai and T. S. Muthaiah. It is notable for being the first ever Malayalam film to receive an A (adults only) certificate. The horror in the film stems from its suspenseful plot, which involves a man investigating his in-laws' connection to a ghost on his wedding night.

== Plot ==
The story follows a man named Rajgopal, a.k.a. Rajan, who becomes suspicious of his new in-laws and a ghost linked to them, leading him to investigate the mystery on his wedding night.

== Cast ==
- Prem Nazir as Rajagopal
- Adoor Bhasi as Appukuttan
- Muthukulam Raghavan Pillai
- T. S. Muthaiah as PK Menon
- Kaduvakkulam Antony
- Kottarakkara Sreedharan Nair as KB Nair
- Latha
- N. Saroja
- Paravoor Bharathan
- Philomina as Madhavi Amma
- Vijaya Nirmala as Radha

== Soundtrack ==
The music was composed by G. Devarajan and the lyrics were written by Vayalar Ramavarma.

Song	Singers
"Aadyathe Raathriyil"	S. Janaki
"Alliyaambal Poovukale"	S. Janaki, P. Jayachandran
"Chilamboli"	L. R. Eeswari
"Maathalappoonkaavilinnale"	S. Janaki
"Nadikal"	P. Leela
"One Two Three"	L. R. Eeswari
