= Indulekha =

Indulekha may refer to:

- Indulekha (novel), an 1889 Malayalam novel by O. Chandu Menon
- Indulekha (1999 film), a 1999 Malayalam film
- Indulekha.com, an infotainment web portal for Malayalam entertainment
- Indulekha (2020 TV series), A 2020 Malayalam TV Series
