= Mathruka Kudumbam =

- Directed by: M. Krishnan Nair; PRS Pillai
- Release date: 10 October 1982
- Country: India
- Language: Malayalam

Mathruka Kudumbam is a 1982 Indian Malayalam film, directed by M. Krishnan Nair.
