= Madatharuvi (film) =

- Directed by: P. A. Thomas
- Written by: Jagathy N. K. Achari
- Screenplay by: Jagathy N. K. Achari
- Produced by: P. A. Thomas
- Starring: Sukumari; Adoor Bhasi; Thikkurissy Sukumaran Nair; Musthafa
- Cinematography: P. B. Maniyam
- Edited by: Ceylon Mani
- Music by: B. A. Chidambaranath
- Production company: Thomas Pictures
- Distributed by: Thomas Pictures
- Release date: 16 June 1967
- Country: India
- Language: Malayalam

Madatharuvi (transl. The Forest Stream) is a 1967 Indian Malayalam-language film, directed and produced by P. A. Thomas. The film stars Sukumari, Adoor Bhasi, Thikkurissy Sukumaran Nair and Musthafa. The musical score was composed by B. A. Chidambaranath.

== Cast ==
- Sukumari
- Adoor Bhasi
- Thikkurissy Sukumaran Nair
- Musthafa
- Muthukulam Raghavan Pillai
- O. Ramdas
- T. R. Omana
- Varghese Vadakara
- Zero Babu
- Nandakumar
- Baby Kanakasree
- Baby Santha
- C. I. Paul
- C. M. Abraham
- Changanacherry Mani
- Chidambaranth
- Eepan
- K. P. Ummer
- Kalavathi Saraswathi
- Kamaladevi
- Kathirpur
- Khadeeja
- Kollam Mani
- Krishnan
- M. G. Menon
- Master Shaji
- Master Dinesh
- Master Joji
- P. A. Krishnan
- Paravoor Bharathan
- Punaloor Alex
- Raghava Menon
- S. N. Puram
- Santo Krishnan
- K. V. Shanthi
- Stunt Bhaskaran
- Suresh Babu
- Ushakumari
- Varma
- Venkidesan
- Wahab Kashmiri

== Soundtrack ==
The music was composed by B. A. Chidambaranath and the lyrics were written by P. Bhaskaran.

No.	Song	Singers	Lyrics	Length (m:ss)
1	"Kanyakamaathaave"	B. Vasantha	P. Bhaskaran	
2	"Karunaakaranaam"	K. J. Yesudas, B. Vasantha	P. Bhaskaran	
3	"Maadatharuvikkarayil"	K. J. Yesudas, Hema	P. Bhaskaran	
4	"Punchiri Chundil"	P. Leela	P. Bhaskaran	
5	"Shakthi Nalkuka"	P. Jayachandran	P. Bhaskaran	
