= Kanakachilanka =

Indian film by M. Krishnan Nair

Kanakachilanga
- Directed by: M. Krishnan Nair
- Written by: Thoppil Bhasi
- Produced by: Sundarlal Nahatha
- Starring: Prem Nazir; Sheela; Muthayya; Adoor Bhasi
- Music by: M. S. Baburaj
- Release date: 1966
- Country: India
- Language: Malayalam

Kanakachilanga (transl. The Golden Anklet) is a 1966 Malayalam language film. It is an adaptation of the Bollywood movie Kismet, starring Ashok Kumar and Mumtaz Shanti. It is the first Malayalam film that included an additional scene after the release.

== Cast ==
- Prem Nazir
- Sheela
- Muthayya
- Adoor Bhasi
- Manavalan Joseph
- T. K. Balachandran
- Thikkurissy Sukumaran Nair
- Pankajavalli
- Pathmini
- Sukumari
