= Koottukar (1966 film) =

- Directed by: J. Sasikumar
- Written by: J. Sasikumar; P. J. Antony (dialogues)
- Starring: Prem Nazir; Sathyan; Sheela; Adoor Bhasi
- Music by: M. S. Baburaj
- Production company: Saravanabhava Pictures
- Distributed by: Saravanabhava Pictures
- Release date: 30 June 1966
- Country: India
- Language: Malayalam

Koottukar (transl. Friends) is a 1966 Indian Malayalam-language film, directed by J. Sasikumar. The film stars Prem Nazir, Sathyan, Sheela and Adoor Bhasi. The film had musical score by M. S. Baburaj. It is the first Malayalam film that focused on the theme of communal harmony.

== Cast ==
- Prem Nazir as Rahim
- Sathyan
- Sheela as Radha
- Adoor Bhasi
- Thikkurissy Sukumaran Nair as Raman Nair
- Manavalan Joseph as Haji
- Ambika as Kadeeja, Rahim's sister
- Kottarakkara Sreedharan Nair as Mammootty, father of Rahim and Kadeeja
- S. P. Pillai as a doctor, Radha's father
- Aranmula Ponnamma as Kaathamma, Raman Nair's wife

== Soundtrack ==
The music was composed by M. S. Baburaj and the lyrics were written by Vayalar Ramavarma.

No.	Song	Singers	Lyrics	Length (m:ss)
1	"Kannaadikkoottile"	P. Susheela	Vayalar Ramavarma	
2	"Kurumozhimulla"	K. J. Yesudas, S. Janaki	Vayalar Ramavarma	
3	"Nizhalukale Nizhalukale"	K. J. Yesudas	Vayalar Ramavarma	
4	"No Vacancy"	K. J. Yesudas	Vayalar Ramavarma	
5	"Oru Jaathi Oru Matham"	K. J. Yesudas	Vayalar Ramavarma	
6	"Veettilinnale Vadakku"	P. Leela, Chorus	Vayalar Ramavarma	
