= Kallipennu =

- Directed by: P. A. Thomas
- Written by: P. A. Thomas; Jagathy N. K. Achari (dialogues)
- Screenplay by: Jagathy N. K. Achari
- Produced by: P. A. Thomas
- Starring: Sathyan; Adoor Bhasi; Thikkurissy Sukumaran Nair; Muthukulam Raghavan Pillai
- Cinematography: P. B. Maniyam
- Edited by: T. R. Sreenivasalu
- Music by: B. A. Chidambaranath
- Production company: Shaji Films
- Distributed by: Shaji Films
- Release date: 11 November 1966
- Country: India
- Language: Malayalam

Kallipennu is a 1966 Indian Malayalam-language film, directed and produced by P. A. Thomas. The film stars Sathyan, Adoor Bhasi, Thikkurissy Sukumaran Nair and Muthukulam Raghavan Pillai. The film had musical score by B. A. Chidambaranath.

== Cast ==
- Sathyan
- Adoor Bhasi
- Thikkurissy Sukumaran Nair
- Muthukulam Raghavan Pillai
- T. R. Omana
- Jolly
- Parvathi
- Premakumari
- K. V. Shanthi
- Ushakumari
- Adithyan

== Soundtrack ==
The music was composed by B. A. Chidambaranath and the lyrics were written by P. Bhaskaran.

No.	Song	Singers	Lyrics	Length (m:ss)
1	"Hemantha Chandrika"	B. Vasantha	P. Bhaskaran	
2	"Kaliyaattathinu"	Kamukara, B. Vasantha	P. Bhaskaran	
3	"Odakkuzhalochayumaay"	S. Janaki	P. Bhaskaran	
4	"Pathinezhaam Vayassinte"	S. Janaki, B Vasantha	P. Bhaskaran	
5	"Thaarukal Chirikkunna"	K. J. Yesudas, S. Janaki	P. Bhaskaran	
6	"Thaarunyathin Mohana Malarvaadi"	L. R. Eeswari	P. Bhaskaran	
7	"Vaasantha Raanikku"	K. J. Yesudas	P. Bhaskaran	
