= Indulekha.com =

Indulekha

- Indulekha website screen shot
- Available in: English
- Owner: Indulekha Media Network
- Creator: Indulekha Media Network
- Website: http://www.indulekha.com
- Registration: No
- Launched: 1 January 2006

Indulekha.com is an infotainment web portal for Malayalam books, movies, music, videos and paintings. The website publishes film and book reviews as well as other entertainment features. The website is edited by Swapna Tom Mangatt.

Indulekha is the first Keralan website to enter the Limca Book of Records after its exhibition of the complete works of Jnanpith Award winner M T Vasudevan Nair. Held between 18 April – 19 May 2006, the exhibition was the first of its kind in the history of Indian internet. Visitors were able to read selected pages from each of the books and leave their comments on the works.

== Channels ==
- The PINK channel depicts trends and temptations in fashion, home making, food and travel. And there's a section of personal finance named, Money Plant.
- The GREEN channel is for the written word and the painted world, adorned by geniuses from Vaikom Muhammad Basheer to Balachandran Chullikkad; from Raja Ravi Varma to Bini Roy. The channel repletes with innovative features including excerpts from books and the best collection of Malayalam e-literature.
- The ORANGE channel entertains with Malayalam movie and music updates, reviews, interviews and interesting videos.
