= Karuna (1966 film) =

1966 Indian film by K. Thankappan

- Directed by: K. Thankappan
- Written by: Kumaranasan; Vaikkom Chandrasekharan Nair (dialogues)
- Produced by: K. Thankappan
- Starring: Madhu; Adoor Bhasi; Thikkurissy Sukumaran Nair; Sankaradi
- Music by: G. Devarajan
- Production company: Giri Movies
- Distributed by: Giri Movies
- Release date: 25 November 1966
- Country: India
- Language: Malayalam

Karuna is a 1966 Indian Malayalam-language film, directed and produced by K. Thankappan. The film stars Devika, Madhu, Adoor Bhasi, Thikkurissy Sukumaran Nair and Sankaradi. G. Devarajan composed the music.

== Cast ==
- Madhu
- Adoor Bhasi
- Thikkurissy Sukumaran Nair
- Sankaradi
- Devika
- K. P. Ummer
- T. K. Balachandran
- Vijaya Rani
- Renuka

== Soundtrack ==
The music was composed by G. Devarajan and the lyrics were written by Kumaran Asan and O. N. V. Kurup.

No.	Song	Singers	Lyrics	Length (m:ss)
1	"Anupama Kripaanidhi"	G. Devarajan	Kumaran Asan	
2	"Budhdham Saranam - Karuna Than Mani"	K. J. Yesudas	O. N. V. Kurup	
3	"Enthinee Chilankakal"	P. Susheela	O. N. V. Kurup	
4	"Kalpatharuvin Thanalil"	K. J. Yesudas, S. Janaki, Chorus	O. N. V. Kurup	
5	"Karayaayka Bhaagini"	K. J. Yesudas	Kumaran Asan	
6	"Madhuraapuri"	P. Susheela	O. N. V. Kurup	
7	"Poothu Poothu"	S. Janaki	O. N. V. Kurup	
8	"Samayamaayilla Polum"	P. Susheela	O. N. V. Kurup	
9	"Thaazhuvathenthe"	Kamukara	O. N. V. Kurup	
10	"Uthara Madhura Veedhikale"	K. J. Yesudas	O. N. V. Kurup	
11	"Vaarthinkal Thoni"	K. J. Yesudas	O. N. V. Kurup	
12	"Varnothsavame"	M. S. Padma	O. N. V. Kurup	
