= Chekuthante Kotta =

- Directed by: M. M. Nesan
- Written by: P. J. Antony
- Produced by: M. M. Nesan
- Starring: Sathyan; Madhu; P. J. Antony; Sankaradi
- Cinematography: T. N. Krishnankutty Nair
- Music by: B. A. Chidambaranath
- Production company: Satish Films
- Release date: 7 December 1967
- Country: India
- Language: Malayalam

Chekuthante Kotta is a 1967 Indian Malayalam-language horror thriller film, directed and produced by M. M. Nesan. The film stars Sathyan, Madhu, P. J. Antony, and Sankaradi. The film had a musical score by B. A. Chidambaranath.

== Plot ==
There is an old bungalow in the forest of High Range. It is known as the Devil's Fort, and even during the day no one goes in that area. It is said that the spirit of a girl who died long ago is still there, At midnight, people hear noises, including a woman's singing, and see a moving skeleton. Local people tell these tales about this bungalow.

Two people from the town come there to investigate the mysteries surrounding this fort: Lawrence and Bhaskaran. Lawrence starts singing while driving through the hills in a jeep and enjoying the natural beauty of the place. Lawrence and Bhaskaran reach the bungalow, which has been empty for many years, and walk around to observe the surroundings. When they come back to the front of the bungalow, they both see that their bags and other things are on fire. Both of them enter the dusty and bat-filled bungalow. The two of them sweep and clean a room. That night, they hear a song of a woman in the distance. Searching for the source of the song, Lawrence and Bhaskaran walk around the bungalow. Suddenly, a skeleton rushes towards them and disappears.

Bhaskaran opines that it is not wise to stay in that place; things are worse than expected. But Lawrence is unmoved. Lawrence argues that ghosts do not exist in this century, and that they are mere human quirks. Not only that, Lawrence also invites other friends to join this adventure. His friends Venugopalan, Iqbal, and Sankaran reach the fort, along with a cook. Lawrence says that there is no ghost in the place, but everyone is scared, especially the cook. Venu is a good guitarist and always has a guitar with him. Lawrence knows that a band of robbers was encamped in that forest and argues that the bandits and the haunting of the bungalow are one and the same. Bhaskaran is also of the opinion that there is truth in what Lawrence is saying.

One day Lawrence hears another song. After hearing that song, Lawrence finally comes upon a beautiful young woman, the first woman Lawrence has seen since coming to the forest. She is Yamuna, the daughter of the forest elder Ponnan. At first sight, Lawrence falls for Yamuna. Local people are surprised to find that five men are still alive in the devil's fort. Lawrence starts cleaning the place with the help of some brave local workers, with Bhaskaran supervising. Meanwhile, Yamuna and Lawrence pledge their love. Bhaskaran, who has just finished his chores, flirts with Yamuna. When Bhaskaran is informed about the fact that Lawrence has gone to Ponnan, Bhaskaran is shocked. He realises the presence of a madman who came from somewhere and is in the forest. Lawrence catches the gang leader who is a terrorist. It was Ponnan himself. By that time police arrive. Ponnan's alter ego (JR Anand) is also caught by Lawrence. It was another person who often cheated people by dressing up as a goldsmith.

== Cast ==
- Sathyan as Lawrence
- Madhu as Venugopal
- Sankaradi
- Ambika as Yamuna
- Bahadoor
- J. A. R. Anand as Ponnan
- S. P. Pillai

== Soundtrack ==
The music was composed by B. A. Chidambaranath and the lyrics were written by P. Bhaskaran.

No.	Song	Singers	Lyrics	Length (m:ss)
1	"Kaanana Sadanathin"	S. Janaki	P. Bhaskaran	3:13
2	"Mandamandam Nidra Vannen"	K. J. Yesudas	P. Bhaskaran	3:22
3	"Oru Malayude"	K. J. Yesudas	P. Bhaskaran	3:15
4	"Premaswapnathin"	Latha Raju	P. Bhaskaran	3:18
5	"Swapnam Ennude Kaathil" (Sad Version)	P. Leela	P. Bhaskaran	3:29
6	"Swapnam Vannen"	P. Leela	P. Bhaskaran	3:06
