= Tharavattamma =

1966 film by P. Bhaskaran

- Directed by: P. Bhaskaran
- Written by: Parappurathu (dialogues)
- Screenplay by: P. Bhaskaran
- Story by: Dada Mirasi
- Produced by: N. Vasudevan
- Starring: Sathyan; Sheela; Sukumari; Thikkurissy Sukumaran Nair
- Cinematography: E. N. Balakrishnan
- Edited by: K. Narayananbr>K. Sankunni
- Music by: M. S. Baburaj
- Production company: Madras Movies
- Release date: 19 September 1966
- Country: India
- Language: Malayalam

Tharavattamma is a 1966 Indian Malayalam-language drama film, directed by P. Bhaskaran and produced by N. Vasudevan. The film stars Sathyan, Sheela, Sukumari and Thikkurissy Sukumaran Nair. It had a musical score composed by M. S. Baburaj.

== Cast ==
- Sathyan as Gopi
- Sheela as Radha
- Adoor Bhasi as Paramu Kurup
- Bahadoor as Mr. Menon
- Sukumari as Velamma
- Thikkurissy Sukumaran Nair as Adv. Keshava Panicker
- G. K. Pillai as Madhavankutty
- K. P. Ummer as Suresh
- Aranmula Ponnamma as Valyamma
- B. S. Saroja as Sarojam
- P. J. Antony as Govinda Pilla
- Prathapachandran
- Vasanthi as Geetha
- P. R. Varalakshmi

== Soundtrack ==
The music was composed by M. S. Baburaj and the lyrics were written by P. Bhaskaran.. Background music was composed by M. B. Sreenivasan

No.	Song	Singers	Lyrics	Length
1	"Chettathiyamma"	Renuka	P. Bhaskaran	
2	"Kanniyil Pirannaalum"	K. J. Yesudas	P. Bhaskaran	
3	"Mannerinjaal Ponnuvilayum"	K. J. Yesudas, Kamala, Renuka, Natarajan, Ramani, Moitheen, Radha	P. Bhaskaran	
4	"Mattoru Seethaye"	Kamukara	P. Bhaskaran	
5	"Oru Kochu Swapnathin"	S. Janaki	P. Bhaskaran	
6	"Pandu Nammal"	S. Janaki, B. Vasantha	P. Bhaskaran	
7	"Udalukalariyaathe"	B. Vasantha, K. P. Udayabhanu	P. Bhaskaran	
