= N.G.O =

- Directed by: S. S. Rajan
- Written by: K. Padmanabhan Nair
- Screenplay by: K. Padmanabhan Nair
- Produced by: K. R. Shanmugham
- Starring: Sathyan Prem Nazir; Sukumari; Adoor Bhasi; Kottayam Santha
- Cinematography: P. Bhaskara Rao
- Music by: B. A. Chidambaranath
- Production company: Anitha Films
- Distributed by: Anitha Films
- Release date: 11 November 1967
- Country: India
- Language: Malayalam

N.G.O is a 1967 Indian Malayalam film, directed by S. S. Rajan and produced by K. R. Shanmugham. The film stars Sathyan, Sukumari, Adoor Bhasi and Kottayam Santha in the lead roles. The film's musical score was by B. A. Chidambaranath.

== Cast ==
- Sathyan
- Prem Nazir
- Sukumari
- Adoor Bhasi
- Kottayam Santha
- Ambika
- S. P. Pillai
- Ushakumari

== Soundtrack ==
The music was composed by B. A. Chidambaranath and the lyrics were written by P. Bhaskaran.

No.	Song	Singer(s)	Lyrics	Length (m:ss)
1	"Kaanan Azhakulloru"	K. J. Yesudas, S. Janaki	P. Bhaskaran	
2	"Kasthoorimulla Than"	P. Susheela	P. Bhaskaran	
3	"Keshapaashadhritha	P. Leela		
4	"Paampine Pedichu""	Latha Raju, Zero Babu	P. Bhaskaran	
5	"Thottilil"	P. Susheela	P. Bhaskaran	
