= Kottayam Kolacase =

- Directed by: K. S. Sethumadhavan
- Written by: Chempil John; S. L. Puram Sadanandan (dialogues)
- Screenplay by: K. S. Sethumadhavan
- Produced by: T. E. Vasudevan
- Starring: Prem Nazir; Sheela; Adoor Bhasi; Sankaradi
- Cinematography: C. Namasivayam
- Edited by: T. R. Sreenivasalu
- Music by: B. A. Chidambaranath
- Production company: Jaya Maruthi
- Release date: 22 March 1967
- Country: India
- Language: Malayalam

Kottayam Kolacase (lit. 'Kottayam murder case') is a 1967 Indian Malayalam-language film, directed by K. S. Sethumadhavan and produced by T. E. Vasudevan. The film stars Prem Nazir, Sheela, Adoor Bhasi and Sankaradi. It was released on 22 March 1967.

== Cast ==
- Prem Nazir
- Sheela
- Adoor Bhasi
- Sankaradi
- G. K. Pillai
- Indira Priyadarsini
- Kamaladevi
- Kottarakkara Sreedharan Nair
- Santha Devi

== Soundtrack ==
No.	Song	Singers	Lyrics	Length
1	"Aaraadhakare"	P. Leela	Vayalar Ramavarma	
2	"Allalulla"	Uthaman	Vayalar Ramavarma	
3	"Kayyil Munthiri"	L. R. Eeswari	Vayalar Ramavarma	
4	"Ponnambalamettil"	P. B. Sreenivas	Vayalar Ramavarma	
5	"Vellaaram Kunninu"	P. Leela, K. P. Chandramohan	Vayalar Ramavarma	
