= C. I. Parameswaran Pillai =

Indian actor (1898–1979)

- Born: 1898; Aluva, Kingdom of Cochin
- Died: 1979 (aged 80–81)
- Occupation: Actor
- Known for: first theatre person from Kerala to win Sangeet Natak Akademi Award
- Awards: Sangeet Natak Akademi Award (1960)

C. I. Parameswaran Pillai was an Indian actor from Kerala. Winning the national honor Sangeet Natak Akademi Award in 1960, he is the first theatre person from Kerala to win this award.

== Biography ==
C. I. Parameswaran Pillai was born in 1898 at Aluva in present-day Ernakulam district of Kerala. Pillai, who had shown a talent for acting in plays since his school days, became active in amateur theatre scene during his college years.

Pillai, a socialist by political affiliation, contested the 1954 Rajya Sabha elections from the Travancore–Cochin assembly constituency as a Revolutionary Socialist Party candidate and lost to N.C. Shekhar of the Communist Party of India.

Parameswaran Pillai died in 1979.

== Career ==
Parameswaran Pillai began his theatrical career by acting in English plays, and later entered the Malayalam theatre stage. He was elected as the first vice-president of the Kerala Sangeetha Nataka Akademi, when it was formed in 1958 under the Department of Cultural Affairs, Government of Kerala. When the Kerala government officially started giving film awards in 1969, the award selection committee was headed by Parameswaran Pillai.

Pillai acted in two Malayalam films, the unreleased 1951 film Thyagaseema and the 1953 film Ponkathir, directed by E.R. Cooper. Tyagaseema was also Prem Nazir's first film. It was Pillai who suggested Prem Nazir to this film and changed his name from Abdul Khader to Prem Nazir.

== Awards and honors ==
Winning the Sangeet Natak Akademi award, in 1960, he is the first theatre person from Kerala to win this award.

The C I Parameswaran Pillai Endowment Award, a yearly award instituted by Kerala Sangeeta Nataka Akademi for acting is named after him. The road in front of the Thiruvananthapuram District Court in Vanchiyoor is named after him.
