= Pakalkkinavu =

- Directed by: S. S. Rajan
- Written by: M. T. Vasudevan Nair
- Screenplay by: M. T. Vasudevan Nair
- Produced by: N. R. Vaidyanadhan
- Starring: Sathyan; Sharada; Adoor Bhasi; Nilambur Balan
- Cinematography: P. Bhaskara Rao
- Edited by: G. Venkittaraman
- Music by: B. A. Chidambaranath
- Production company: Kannamma Films
- Distributed by: Kannamma Films
- Release date: 8 April 1966
- Country: India
- Language: Malayalam

Pakalkkinavu (transl. Daydream) is a 1966 Indian Malayalam-language film, directed by S. S. Rajan and produced by N. R. Vaidyanadhan. The film stars Sathyan, Sharada, Adoor Bhasi and Nilambur Balan.

== Cast ==
- Sathyan as Babu
- Sharada as Malathi
- Nellikode Bhaskaran as Chandran
- Adoor Bhasi as Krishnankutty
- Vasanthi as Shari
- Nilambur Balan
- Rajakolila
- Baby Sreelatha as Thankamani
- Balan Pallippattu
- Kaduvakulam Antony as Kittunni
- Kunjava as Shankaran
- Latha Raju as Ammini
- M. S. Namboothiri as Kurup
- Premji as Master
- Krishnankutty

== Soundtrack ==
The music was composed by B. A. Chidambaranath with lyrics by P. Bhaskaran.

Song	Singers
"Guruvaayoorulloru"	S. Janaki
"Kaakkaykkum Poochakkum"	K. J. Yesudas
"Keshaadipaadam Thozhunnen" (Gopala Rathnam)	S. Janaki
"Nidrathan Neeraazhi"	S. Janaki
"Pakalkkinaavin Sundaramaakum"	K. J. Yesudas
