= Manushyan =

- Directed by: P. Revindren
- Starring: Madhu; Kuthiravattam Pappu; Vidhubala
- Edited by: G. Venkittaraman
- Music by: V. Dakshinamoorthy
- Production company: Kalasakthi Films
- Distributed by: Kalasakthi Films
- Release date: 3 February 1979
- Country: India
- Language: Malayalam

Manushyan is a 1979 Indian Malayalam film, directed by P. Ravindran. The film stars Madhu, Kuthiravattam Pappu and Vidhubala in the lead roles. The film has musical score by V. Dakshinamoorthy.

== Cast ==
- Madhu
- Kuthiravattam Pappu
- Vidhubala

== Soundtrack ==
The music was composed by V. Dakshinamoorthy and the lyrics were written by Bharanikkavu Sivakumar and O. N. V. Kurup.

No.	Song	Singers	Lyrics	Length (m:ss)
1	"Aadiyushassil"	K. J. Yesudas	Bharanikkavu Sivakumar	
2	"Aakashame"	K. J. Yesudas	O. N. V. Kurup	
3	"Etho Sandhyayil"	K. J. Yesudas	O. N. V. Kurup	
4	"Hamsapadangalil"	Vani Jairam	Bharanikkavu Sivakumar	
