= T. K. Balachandran =

Indian actor (1928–2005)

- Born: 2 February 1928
- Died: 15 December 2005 (aged 77)
- Occupation: Actor
- Years active: 1950–1995
- Spouse: Vishalakshi
- Children: Vasanth, Vinod
- Parent(s): P. K. Kunjan Pillai; Parukkuttiyamma
- Relatives: Vanchiyoor Madhavan Nair (brother)

T. K. Balachandran was an Indian actor who worked mainly in Malayalam films. He has acted in more than 200 films. His areas of contribution includes production, dialogue, story, screenplay. He is the first actor to play a double role in the history of Malayalam cinema.

== Background ==
T. K. Balachandran was the fifth son of Kunjan Pillai and Parukkuttiyamma. At 13 years of age, he acted in the movie "Prahlaada" in 1940. In 1968, he acted in Viruthan Shanku, the first full-length comedy in Malayalam cinema directed by P. Venu. In 1998, the Malayalam, Tamil, Kannada and Telugu Cinema Industry jointly elected him President of the South Indian Film Chamber. Taking into consideration his invaluable contributions to Indian Cinema, he was awarded the President's gold medal. He has received numerous other awards and recognition. He died at his home in Thiruvananthapuram, at 78 years of age, on 15 December 2005 after fighting a prolonged battle with cancer. He was survived by his wife and son.

== Family ==
He was married to Vishalakshi. The couple had two sons Vasanth and Vinod. Actor Vanchiyoor Madhavan Nair was his elder brother.

== Filmography ==
=== As an actor ===
==== Malayalam ====
- Ellaavarkkum Nanmakal (1987)
- Snehicha Kuttathinu (1985) as Advocate
- Inakkily (1984)
- Aagamanam (1980)
- Pambaram (1979) as Swami
- Sakhaakkale Munnottu (1977)
- Chirikkudukka (1976)
- Yakshagaanam (1976)
- Prasadam (1976) as Chellappan
- Devi Kanyaakumaari (1974)
- Raakkuyil (1973)
- Udayam (1973)
- Aaradi Manninte Janmi (1972) as Murali
- Azhimukham (1972)
- Professor (1972) as Das
- Vidyarthikale Ithile Ithile (1972)
- Sree Guruvayoorappan (1972)
- Anubhavangal Paalichakal (1971) as Kumaran
- Aana Valarthiya Vaanampaadiyude Makan (1971)
- Vimochanasamaram (1971)
- Vivaaham Swargathil (1970)
- Priya (1970)
- Ezhuthaatha Kadha (1970)
- Padicha Kallan (1969)
- Ballaatha Pahayan (1969) as Chandran
- Vilakkappetta Bandhangal (1969)
- Kumara Sambhavam (1969) as Naradan
- Adhyaapika (1968)
- Viplavakarikal (1968) as Ravi
- Viruthan Shanku (1968) as Kittunni
- Karutha Rathrikal (1967)
- Agniputhri (1967) as Balendran
- Jeevikkaan Anuvadikkoo (1967)
- Kanakachilanka (1966)
- Karuna (1966)
- Kalithozhan (1966)
- Chettathi (1965) as Gopi
- Bhoomiyile Malakha (1965) as Mathews
- Omanakuttan (1964)
- Bharthavu (1964)
- Kalanju Kittiya Thankam (1964) as Madhu
- Snehadeepam (1962) as Chandran
- Sreeraama Pattaabhishekam (1962)
- Christmas Rathri (1961) as Dr Mathew
- Bhaktha Kuchela (1961) as Naradan
- Poothali (1960)
- Aniyathi (1955) as Babu
- Prahlada (1941)

==== Tamil ====
- Jathagam (1953)
- Andha Naal (1954)
- Nadodi Mannan (1958)
- Kaalam mari pochu
- Pandi Thevan (1958)
- Deivathin Deivam (1962)
- Kulavilakku (1969)
- Neethi (1972)

=== Production ===
- Aalasyam (1990)
- Ellaavarkkum Nanmakal (Puthan Thalamura) (1987)
- TP Baalagopaalan MA (1986)
- Snehicha Kuttathinu (1985)
- Oru Thettinte Kadha (1984)
- Deepaaradhana (1983)
- Drohi (1982)
- Rakthasaakshi (1982)
- Kaattukallan (1981)
- Pralayam (1980)
- Kaalam Kaathuninnilla (1979)
- Pambaram (1979)
- Praarthana (1978)
- Sakhaakkale Munnottu (1977)
- Prasaadam (1976)
- Chief Guest (1975)
- Poymukhangal (1973)

=== Story ===
- Deepaaradhana (1983)
- Drohi (1982)
- Rakthasaakshi (1982)
- Kaattukallan (1981)
- Praarthana (1978)
- Chief Guest (1975)

=== Dialogue, screenplay ===
- Deepaaradhana (1983)
- Rakthasaakshi (1982)
- Pambaram (1979)
