= Postman (1967 film) =

- Poster
- Directed by: P. A. Thomas
- Screenplay by: Jagathy N. K. Achary
- Story by: P. A. Thomas
- Produced by: P. A. Thomas
- Starring: Sathyan; Kaviyoor Ponnamma; Thikkurissy Sukumaran Nair; Hari
- Cinematography: P. B. Maniyam
- Edited by: Ceylon Mani
- Music by: B. A. Chidambaranath
- Production company: Thomas Pictures
- Release date: 28 April 1967
- Country: India
- Language: Malayalam

Postman is a 1967 Indian Malayalam-language film, directed and produced by P. A. Thomas. The film stars Sathyan, Kaviyoor Ponnamma, Thikkurissy Sukumaran Nair and Hari, with music composed by B. A. Chidambaranath.

== Cast ==
- Sathyan
- Kaviyoor Ponnamma
- Thikkurissy Sukumaran Nair
- Hari
- O. Ramdas
- T. R. Omana
- K. P. Ummer
- Kamaladevi
- K. V. Shanthi

== Soundtrack ==
The music was composed by B. A. Chidambaranath.

Song	Singers	Lyrics
"Arimullavalli"	P. Jayachandran	Vayalar Ramavarma
"Gokulapaala"	P. Leela	Vayalar Ramavarma
"Kaarmukile – Kannuneer Kadal"	K. J. Yesudas	Vayalar Ramavarma
"Kumbalam Nattu"	B. Vasantha, Zero Babu	Vayalar Ramavarma
"Narthaki Narthaki"	K. J. Yesudas	Vayalar Ramavarma
"Omanathinkal Kidaavo"	K. J. Yesudas, B. Vasantha	Irayimman Thampi
