= Kunjali Marakkar (film) =

- Poster
- Directed by: S. S. Rajan
- Screenplay by: K. Padmanabhan Nair
- Produced by: T. K. Pareekutty
- Starring: Prem Nazir; Sukumari; P. K. Saraswathi; P. K. Sathyapal
- Cinematography: A. Vincent; P. Bhaskara Rao
- Edited by: G. Venkittaraman
- Music by: B. A. Chidambaranath
- Production company: Chandrathara
- Distributed by: Chandrathara
- Release date: 1967
- Country: India
- Language: Malayalam

Kunjali Marakkar is a 1967 Indian Malayalam-language historical film directed by S. S. Rajan, written by K. Padmanabhan Nair and produced by T. K. Pareekutty. It stars Kottarakkara Sreedharan Nair, Prem Nazir, Sukumari, P. K. Saraswathi and P. K. Sathyapal. The film has a musical score by B. A. Chidambaranath. The film won the National Film Award for Best Feature Film in Malayalam.

== Cast ==
- Prem Nazir as Antonio / Narayanan Nair
- Sukumari
- P. K. Saraswathi
- P. K. Sathyapal
- P. J. Antony as Zamorin's nephew
- Jyothi Lakshmi
- Kottarakkara Sreedharan Nair as Kunjali Marakkar, Chief Naval Officer of Samoothiri
- Kunjava
- Kuthiravattam Pappu
- Kuttyedathi Vilasini
- Premji as Zamorin of Calicut
- Santha Devi

== Soundtrack ==
The music was composed by B. A. Chidambaranath and the lyrics were written by P. Bhaskaran. The song Oru Mullappoomaalayumaay marked the film debut of the playback singer P. Jayachandran.

No.	Song	Singers	Lyrics	Length (m:ss)
1	"Aattinakkare"	P. Jayachandran, A. K. Sukumaran, A. P. Komala, B. Vasantha, K. P. Chandramohan	P. Bhaskaran	
2	"Muttathu Pookkana"	P. Leela	P. Bhaskaran	
3	"Neeyillaathaarundabhayam"	S. Janaki	P. Bhaskaran	
4	"Ololam Kaavilulla"	S. Janaki	P. Bhaskaran	
5	"Oru Mullappoomaalayumaay"	P. Jayachandran, Prema	P. Bhaskaran	
6	"Udikkunna Sooryane"	K. J. Yesudas, P. Jayachandran, A. K. Sukumaran	P. Bhaskaran	
