= P. A. Thomas =

Indian film director

- Born: 22 March 1922; Trivandrum, Kingdom of Travancore, British India (present day Thiruvananthapuram, Kerala, India)
- Died: 19 January 1995 (aged 72)
- Occupations: Director; Producer; Scriptwriter; Actor
- Years active: 1950–1995
- Spouse: Rose
- Parents: Abraham; Mariamma

Puthanangadi Abraham Thomas (22 March 1922 – 19 January 1995) was an Indian film director, producer, script writer, theater artist and actor in Malayalam movies. He directed at least 16 movies and produced 11 movies during the 1960s and 1970s. He also acted in around 20 movies.

Some of the popular movies he produced are Oraal Koodi Kallanaayi (1964), Kudumbini (1964), Porter Kunjali (1965), Station Master (1967) and Thomasleeha (1975). All his movies dealt with the contemporary social issues.

== Career ==
After passing the intermediate course, Thomas entered professional drama troupe as an actor. He later formed his own professional drama troupe and presented several dramas all over Kerala and in other parts of India.

He was offered a role in the 1950 film Prasanna which was directed by Sri Ramadu Naidu and next year in 1951 he became the hero of Vanamala film which was directed by Dr. G. Viswanath. Vanamala which was released in 1951 was the first jungle film in Malayalam cinema. He later entered to the field of direction also and directed several successful films in Malayalam. Thomas himself was the producer of many films which he directed.

== Personal life and death ==
Thomas was born in Puthanangadi family to Abraham and Mariamma on 22 March 1922 at Njarakkal.

He was married to Thresia and had 3 children. Thomas died on 19 January 1995, at the age of 72.

== Filmography ==
=== Direction ===
- Sreekovil (1962)
- Oraal Koodi Kallanaayi (1964)
- Kudumbini (1964)
- Bhoomiyile Malakha (1965)
- Porter Kunjali (1965)
- Kayamkulam Kochunni (1966)
- Kallippennu (1966)
- Station Master (1966)
- Jeevikkan Anuvadikku (1967)
- Pavappettaval (1967)
- Postman (1967)
- Madatharuvi (1967)
- Sahadharmini (1967)
- Thalaivan (1970) (Tamil)
- Jesus (1973)
- Thomasleeha (1975)

=== Acting ===
- Prasanna (1950)
- Vanamaala (1951)
- Kaanchana (1952)
- Malaikkallan (1954)
- Manasaakshi (1954)
- Thaskaraveeran (1957)
- Chathurangam (1959)
- Naadodikal (1959)
- Mudiyanaaya Puthran (1961)
- Sreekovil (1962)
- Veluthambi Dalawa (1962)
- Oraal Koodi Kallanaayi (1964)
- Kudumbini (1964)
- Kalyaana Photo (1964)
- Thacholi Othenan (1964)
- Porter Kunjali (1965)
- Viruthan Shanku (1968)
- Aruthu (1976)
- Nizhal Moodiya Nirangal (1983)

=== Production ===
- Oraal Koodi Kallanaayi (1964)
- Kudumbini (1964)
- Bhoomiyile Maalakha (1965)
- Porter Kunjaali (1965)
- Kallippennu (1966)
- Station Master (1966)
- Postman (1967)
- Maadatharuvi (1967)
- Sahadharmini (1967)
- Thomasleeha (1975)
- Nizhal Moodiya Nirangal (1983)

=== Screenplay ===
- Postman (1967)
- Jesus (1973)
- Anuraagam (2002)

=== Story ===
- Kallippennu (1966)
- Postman (1967)
- Sahadharmini (1967)

=== Dialogue ===
- Anuraagam (2002; posthumous adaptation)
