= B. Vasantha =

South Indian playback singer (born 1944)

Kalaimamani B. Vasantha
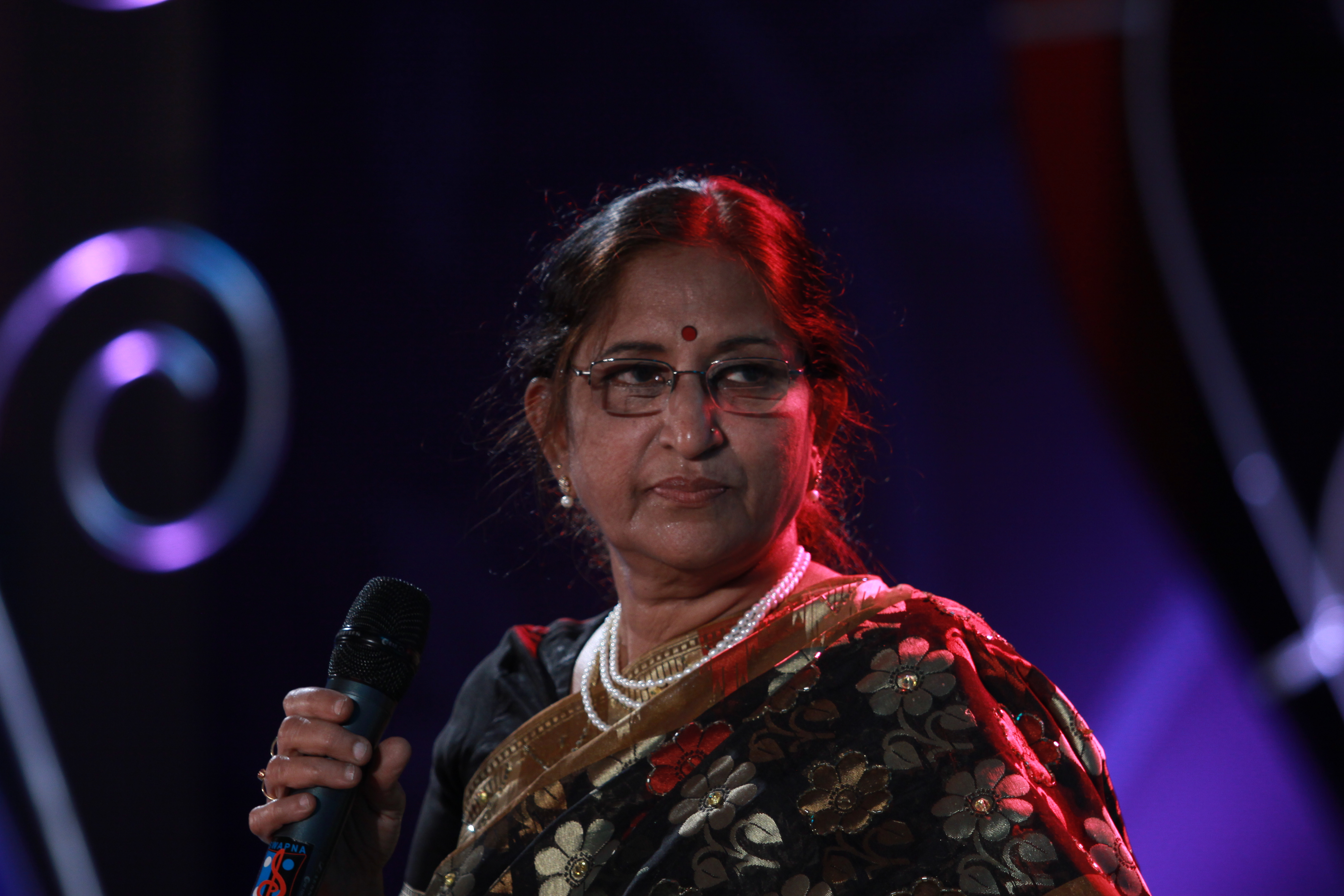

Background information
- Born: March 29, 1944 (age 82); Machilipatnam, Andhra Pradesh
- Genres: playback singing, Indian classical
- Occupation: Singer
- Instrument: Vocalist
- Years active: 1962-present
- Award: Kalaimamani Award (2004)

Boduppalli Vasantha (born 29 March 1944) is a South Indian playback singer.

== Early life ==
B. Vasantha was born on 29 March 1944 in Machilipatnam, Andhra Pradesh, to Kanaka Durga and Boddupalli Ravindranath. She was the eldest of five children. Her father was a musician, painter, and photographer.

Vasantha was raised in Guntur, where she developed an interest in music at an early age and began singing during her childhood.

== Career ==
Vasantha has recorded more than 4,000 songs in several Indian languages, including Kannada, Malayalam, Tamil, Telugu, Tulu, Sanskrit, and Hindi.

Her first playback song in Malayalam cinema was for the 1965 film Muthalali, while her debut in Tamil cinema was with Konchum Kumari (1963). She collaborated extensively with singer K. J. Yesudas on Malayalam film songs and also performed playback singing for films in Kannada, Hindi, and Telugu.

== Awards ==
- 2004: Received title of Kalaimamani Award by the Government of Tamil Nadu, which is the highest state honour in the field of Arts
- Received the Ugadi Award by the Government of Andhra Pradesh
- G Devarajan Shakthigada Award
