= L. P. R. Varma =

Lakshmipuram Palace Pooram Thirunal Ravi Varma
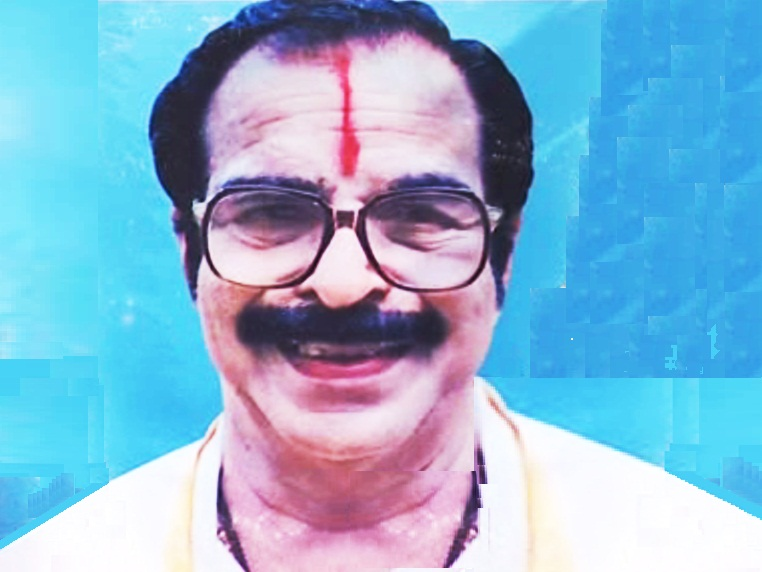
- L.P.R. Varma

Background information
- Born: 18 February 1927
- Origin: Changanacherry, Travancore
- Died: 6 July 2003 (aged 76)
- Occupations: Lyricist, music director, classical vocalist, actor, playback singer
- Instrument: Music director (playback singing)

Lakshmipuram Palace Pooram Thirunal Ravi Varma known as L.P.R. Varma (1927–2003) was a Carnatic musician, lyricist, music director, singer, screenwriter, and infrequent actor.

== Life ==
Varma was born in Lakshmipuram Palace, the Puzhavathu, Changanassery in Travancore State, on 18 February 1927, as the son of Mangalabayi Thamburatti and Olappamanna Vasudevan Namboodiripad. He belonged to the Parappanangadi royal family (Malabar – part of North Kerala), which fled to Travancore during the invasion of Tipu Sultan and settled in Changanassery. He began learning music at the age of eight and was trained under Muthiah Bhagavatar, Semmangudi Srinivasa Iyer and Madurai Keshava Bhagavathar.

He conducted a large number of Carnatic music concerts in south India. He performed and composed music for many Malayalam films and professional dramas. He generally performed in Malayalam language. In 1978, he received the Kerala Sangeetha Nataka Akademi Award.

He acted in Malayalam movie Ayitham (1988) starring Mohanlal as Vishwanatha Bhagavathar.

He died after a cardiac arrest on 6 July 2003, aged 76. He was cremated at the premises of his home in Changanassery the next day.
