= M. Krishnan Nair (director) =

Indian film director

- Born: 2 November 1926
- Died: 10 May 2001 (aged 74); Thiruvananthapuram, Kerala, India
- Occupation: Film director
- Spouse: S. Sulochana Devi
- Children: 3 (incl. K. Jayakumar and Sreekumar Krishnan Nair)
- Parent(s): R. Madhavan Pillai; Chellamma Pillai

M. Krishnan Nair (2 November 1926 – 10 May 2001) was an Indian film director of Malayalam films. He directed over 100 films. He also directed 18 Tamil movie including four films starring M. G. Ramachandran and two Telugu movies, one each with superstars N. T. Rama Rao and Krishna. Eminent filmmakers including Hariharan, K. Madhu, S. P. Muthuraman, Bharathiraja and Joshiy worked with him as assistant directors.

In 2000, he was honoured with the J. C. Daniel Award, Kerala government's highest honour for contributions to Malayalam cinema.

== Personal life ==
Krishnan Nair was born in Travancore (Kerala) as the son of R. Madhavan Pillai and Chellamma Pillai. He was married to K. Sulochana Devi, and had three sons. Their eldest son K. Jayakumar is a poet, lyricist and former bureaucrat who currently serves as the Vice Chancellor of Malayalam University. His second son is Harikumar, while his youngest son Sreekumar Krishnan Nair is a film director best known for directing O' Faby (1993), India's first live-action/animation hybrid feature film.

== Selected filmography ==
- 1987 Kalam Mari Katha Mari
- 1985 Puzhayozhukum Vazhi
- 1984 Manithali
- 1983 Maniyara
- 1983 Paalam
- 1982 Mylanji
- 1982 Oru Kunju Janikkunnu
- 1980 Dwik Vijayam
- 1980 Rajaneegandhi
- 1979 Ajnatha Theerangal
- 1979 Kalliyankattu Neeli
- 1979 Oru Raagam Pala Thaalam
- 1978 Ashoka Vanam
- 1978 Aval Kanda Lokam
- 1978 Ithanente Vazhi
- 1978 Rowdy Ramu
- 1978 Urakkam Varaatha Rathrikal
- 1977 Madhura Swapanam
- 1977 Santha Oru Devatha
- 1977 Thaalappoly
- 1977 Yatheem
- 1976 Amma
- 1976 Neela Sari
- 1976 Oorukku Uzhaippavan (Tamil)
- 1974 Suprabhatham
- 1973 Bhadradeepam
- 1973 Thottavadi
- 1973 Yamini
- 1973 Thalai Prasavam (Tamil)
- 1972 Manthrakodi
- 1972 Naan Yen Pirandhen (Tamil)
- 1972 Annamitta Kai (Tamil)
- 1971 Rickshawkaran (Tamil)
- 1971 Agnimrigam
- 1971 Tapaswini
- 1970 Bheekara Nimishangal
- 1970 Chitti Chellelu (Telugu)
- 1970 Detective 909
- 1970 Palunkupaathram
- 1970 Sabarimala Shri Dharmasastha
- 1970 Tara
- 1970 Vivahitha
- 1969 Anaachadanam
- 1969 Mannippu (Tamil)
- 1969 Jwala
- 1969 Maganey Nee Vazhga (Tamil)
- 1969 Padicha Kallan
- 1968 Circar Express (Telugu)
- 1968 Agni Pareeksha
- 1968 Anchu Sundariakal
- 1968 Inspector
- 1968 Kadal
- 1968 Karthika
- 1968 Paadunna Puzha
- 1968 Muthu Chippi (Tamil)
- 1967 Agniputhri
- 1967 Cochin Express
- 1967 Collector Malathy
- 1967 Kaanatha Veshangal
- 1967 Khadeeja
- 1967 Kudumbam (Tamil)
- 1966 Kalithozhan
- 1966 Kalyana Rathriyil
- 1966 Kanaka Chilanga
- 1966 Kusruthy Kuttan
- 1966 Pinchu Hridhayam
- 1965 Kadathukaran
- 1965 Kathirunna Nikah
- 1965 Kattu Thulasi
- 1965 Kavya Mela
- 1964 Bharthavu
- 1964 Karutha Kai
- 1964 Kutti Kuppayam
- 1963 Kaattu Mynah
- 1962 Viyarpintae Vila
- 1960 Aalukkoru Veedu (Tamil)
- 1955 Aniyathi
- 1955 C.I.D
