= B. A. Chidambaranath =

Indian composer

B. A. Chidambaranathan

Background information
- Born: 19 March 1924; Nagercoil, Travancore
- Origin: Boothapandi, present-day Kanyakumari District, Tamil Nadu
- Died: 31 August 2007 (aged 82) Chennai, Tamil Nadu, India
- Occupations: Music director, professor, playback singer
- Instruments: Harmonium, Vocals, Violin, Mridangam, Kanjira
- Years active: 1948–1974

Bhoothapandi Arunachalam Chidambaranathan (19 March 1924 – 31 August 2007) was an Indian film score composer and musician who worked mainly in Malayalam films.

== Biography ==
Hailing from a family of reputed musicians from Nagercoil in the Kingdom of Travancore ((now in Kanyakumari district, Tamil Nadu, India), Chidambaranathan took early lessons in mridangam and Carnatic vocal from his father, B. K. Arunachalam Annavi, who was a popular musician of his times. He also took training for sometime under Muttiah Bhagavathar and used to play mridangam for him at his concerts. He then learnt the violin first under Nagamani Marthanda Nadar and then for seven years under the Kumbakonam Rajamanickam Pillai. Chidmabranathan was noticed by music director C. N. Pandurangan, when he was playing violin at a concert of M. M. Dandapani Desikar. His film career began in 1948 when he assisted Pandurangan for the Tamil films Gokuladasi and Jnanasoundari.

He debuted in Malayalam with Vellinakshathram, the first film of Udaya Studios. He had also scored a Sinhalese film before his entry into Malayalam. After scoring the film Sthree (1950), his third film as a composer, Chidambaranathan took a sabbatical and did not contribute to film music for 14 years. He joined All India Radio and worked for their musical productions and conducted his own concerts during this time. It was P. Bhaskaran who brought him back to film scoring. His magnum opus Murappennu was released in 1965. Songs like "Karayunno Puzha Chirikkunno" and "Kadavathu Thoniyaduthappol", both from this film, are considered his masterpieces. "Karayunno Puzha Chirikkunno" was described by The Hindu as one of the greatest melodies of all time in Malayalam cinema. With Murappennu, he established himself as one of the leading composers and went on to score some of the major films and hit songs in the late 1960s and 1970s. In 1968, he composed music for the film Viruthan Shanku, the first full-length comedy in Malayalam cinema directed by P. Venu. He has scored music for more than 30 Malayalam films. Most of his songs were recorded by S. Janaki and K. J. Yesudas. He also holds the credit for introducing playback singer P. Jayachandran (in the film Kunjali Marakkar). Most of his songs were penned by P. Bhaskaran. His association with Vayalar, which began in Kottayam Kolakase has also spawned numerous hit songs. His last work was Aramana Veedum Anjoorekkarum (1996), which he composed along with his son Rajamani. Apart from film songs, he also composed a few devotional songs and Carnatic kritis. He had also worked as a music professor in Anna University for a short period. He was honoured with the Kalaimamani award by the Tamil Nadu government.

== Death ==
Chidambaranath died on 31 August 2007 at his home in Chennai. He was aged 83 at the time of his death, and was suffering from cancer during his last days. He is survived by six out of his seven children. His wife, Thulasi, whom he married in 1955, died on 25 August 2013, just five days short of her husband's sixth death anniversary. Rajamani, his son and another famous music director, died on 14 February 2016. His grandson Achu Rajamani is also a music composer.

== Selected filmography ==
- Vellinakshathram
- Murappennu
- Station Master
- Pakalkkinavu
- Kayamkulam Kochunni
- Kallipennu
- Kunjali Marakkar
- Kottayam Kolakase
- Viruthan Shanku
- Postman
- Kaanaatha Veshangal
- Sahadharmini
- Maadatharuvi
- Paavappettaval
- N. G. O.
- Chekuthante Kotta
- Janmabhoomi
- Aaryankavu Kollasangam
- Rahsiyam
- Chattambi Kavala
- Kalippava
- Aramana Veedum Anjoorekkarum
