= Muthukulam Raghavan Pillai =

Indian author

Muthukulam Raghavan Pilla
- Born: 01-1900; Haripad, Travancore Now in Kerala, India
- Died: 08-08-1979; Madras
- Occupations: Actor, Writer, Lyricist
- Years active: 1930-1970

Muthukulam Raghavan Pillai (22 January 1900) was a writer, actor, poet and lyricist of early Malayalam Cinema who was well known for the roles like Ashaan in Kavyamela.

== Early life ==
He was born on 22 January 1900 in Muthukulam a small village near Haripad and Kayamkulam, in Kerala. He wrote the screenplay and dialogues of Balan, the first Malayalam talkie. He is also the author of about 55 dramas and dozens of film stories and screenplays. In 1968, he acted in Viruthan Shanku, the first full-length comedy in Malayalam cinema directed by P. Venu. He acted in around 150 Malayalam films and wrote Tatathaka Parinayam Kathakali. An award named Muthukulam Raghavan Pillai Puraskaram has been instituted by Muthukulam Raghavan Pillai Samraka Samithi in honour of him.

== Filmography ==
1. Rajayogam (1976)
2. Kamam Krodham Moham (1975)
3. Chief Guest (1975)
4. Pulivalu (1975)
5. Babumon (1975) as Advocate
6. Vandikkari (1974)
7. Bhoomidevi Pushipiniyayi (1974)
8. Thacholi Marumakan Chandu (1974) as Kanachira Kannappan
9. Checkpost (1974)
10. Swarga Puthri (1973) as Paulose
11. Kaliyugam (1973)
12. Interview (1973) as Sekhara Pilla
13. Masappadi Mathupilla (1973)
14. Manushyaputhran (1973) as Vaidyar
15. Chukku (1973)
16. Yamini (1973) as Chettiyar
17. Ladies Hostel (1973) as Kunju
18. Maya (1972)
19. Punarjanmam (1972)
20. Balya Prathigna (1972)
21. Kandavarundo? (1972)
22. Mayiladumkunnu (1972)
23. Bobanum Moliyum (1971)
24. YOugumullaval (1971)
25. Anubhavangal Paalichakal(1971) as Kurup Sakhavu
26. Oru Penninte Kadha (1971)
27. Aranazhika Neram (1970) as Lona
28. Lottery Ticket (1970)
29. Ezhuthatha Kadha (1970)
30. Vazhve Mayam (1970) as Panchayat member
31. Saraswathi (1970)
32. Vivahitha (1970)
33. Nurse (1969)
34. Sandhya (1969)
35. Velliyazhcha (1969) Paramu Pilla
36. Viplavakarikal (1968)
37. Thokkukal Kadha Parayunnu (1968)
38. Vidyarthi (1968)
39. Vazhi Pizhacha Sandathi (1968)
40. Viruthan Shanku (1968) as Forest Officer
41. Lady Doctor (1967) as Mathai
42. Sahadarmini (1967)
43. Madatharuvi (1967)
44. Karutharathrikal (1967)
45. Ullathumathi (1967)
46. Bhagyamudra (1967)
47. Pavappettaval (1967) as Narayana Pilla
48. Rowdy (1966)
49. Kalyanarathriyil (1966)
50. Kadamattathachan (1966)
51. Sthanarthi Saramma (1966) as Antonychan
52. Pinchuhridayam (1966)
53. Kalipennu (1966)
54. Kusruthikuttan (1966)
55. Kayamkulam Kochunni (1966) as Achuthan Nair
56. Archana (1966)
57. Kavyamela (1965) as Ashaan
58. Sarpakadu (1965)
59. Kuppivala (1965) as Kittumman
60. Porter Kunjali (1965) as Keshava Pilla
61. Bhoomilyile Malakha (1965)
62. Kalyana Photo (1964)
63. Kudumbini (1964) as Kunju Kaniyar
64. Kalayum Kaminiyum (1963)
65. Kattumaina (1963)
66. Swargarajayam (1962)
67. Vidhi Thanna Vilakku (1962)
68. Kannum Karalum (1962)
69. Viyarpinte Vila (1962)
70. Umminithanka (1961)
71. Nairu Pidicha Pulivalu (1958) as Kuttappa Kurup
72. Lilly (1958)
73. Achanum Makanum (1957)
74. Koodapirappu (1956)
75. Kidappadam (1955)
76. Avan Varunnu (1954)
77. Avakashi (1954) as Manmadan
78. Snehaseema (1954) as Thommi
79. Sandehi (1954)
80. Ponkathir (1953)
81. Lokaneethi (1953)
82. Athmasakhi (1952)
83. Vanamala (1951)
84. Navalokam (1951)
85. Yachakan(1951)
86. Jeevithanauka (1951)
87. Nallathanka (1950)
