= M. O. Joseph =

Indian film producer (1929–2016)

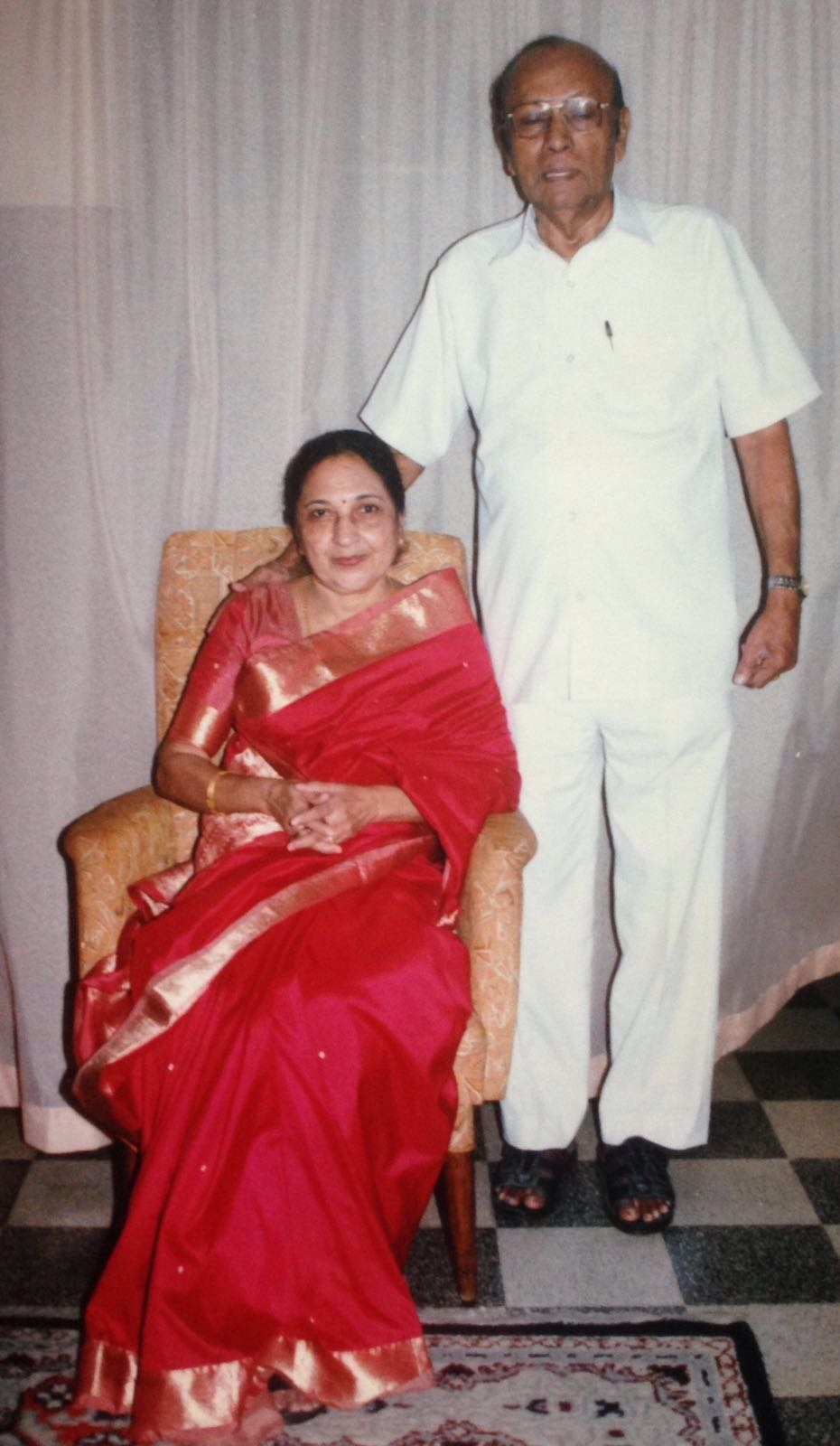
- M. O. Joseph with his wife, Kunjamma Joseph, in 2016.
- Born: 15 January 1929; Thrissur, Kerala, India
- Died: 8 January 2016 (aged 86); Chennai, Tamil Nadu, India
- Occupation: Film Producer
- Years active: 1967–1983
- Notable work: Yakshi, Adimakal, Chattakkari, Anubhavangal Palichakal, Punarjanmam
- Spouse: Kunjamma Joseph
- Children: 5
- Awards: Filmfare Award for Best Film - Malayalam (1969, 1970)

Manjilas Ouseph Joseph (15 January 1929 – 8 January 2016) was a Malayali film producer. He produced over 30 films in the 1960s and 1970s, including Yakshi, Adimakal, Devi, Chattakkari, Anubhavangal Palichakal, and Punarjanmam. He received two Filmfare Awards South for Best Malayalam Film. His films also received awards, including the National Film Award for Best Feature Film in Malayalam.

== Early life ==
Joseph was born on 15 January 1929 and grew up in Thrissur. His father was the manager of the Jose Theatre, which was started by Kattukkaran Varunny Joseph. He studied at St. Thomas College and later graduated with a Bachelor of Commerce from the Sacred Heart College in Ernakulam, where his father was employed by the Shenoys Theatre. Upon completing his education, Joseph's father recommended that he assist T. E. Vasudevan, who was involved in the distribution and production of films under the banner of Associated Pictures, as an apprentice.

== Career ==
Joseph joined Vasudevan in 1950 with an initial salary of ₹150 per month ($31.50 per month in 1950 USD). Associated Pictures was in a financial partnership with the Shenoys. Vasudevan later launched his own business by starting JayaMaruthi Pictures, with Joseph joining him.

Joseph moved to Madras (now Chennai) in 1951 to manage the regional business of Associated Pictures. His initial foray into independent filmmaking was through a partnership with P. Balthazar and NV Joseph, under the production company Navajeevan Films. The first film, ‘Naadan Pennu’ was released in 1967. It was directed by K. S. Sethumadhavan.

During the 1960's and 1970's, Joseph produced films under the Manjilas banner, working with directors such as K. S. Sethumadhavan, Thoppil Baasi, and I. V. Sasi.

== Contributions to Malayalam film industry ==
Joseph was a founder member of the Malayalam Chalachitra Parishad, an organization supporting film artists and their families. He also contributed to fundraising efforts for the Parishad. He was a founder member of the management committee of Asan Memorial College of Engineering and Technology.

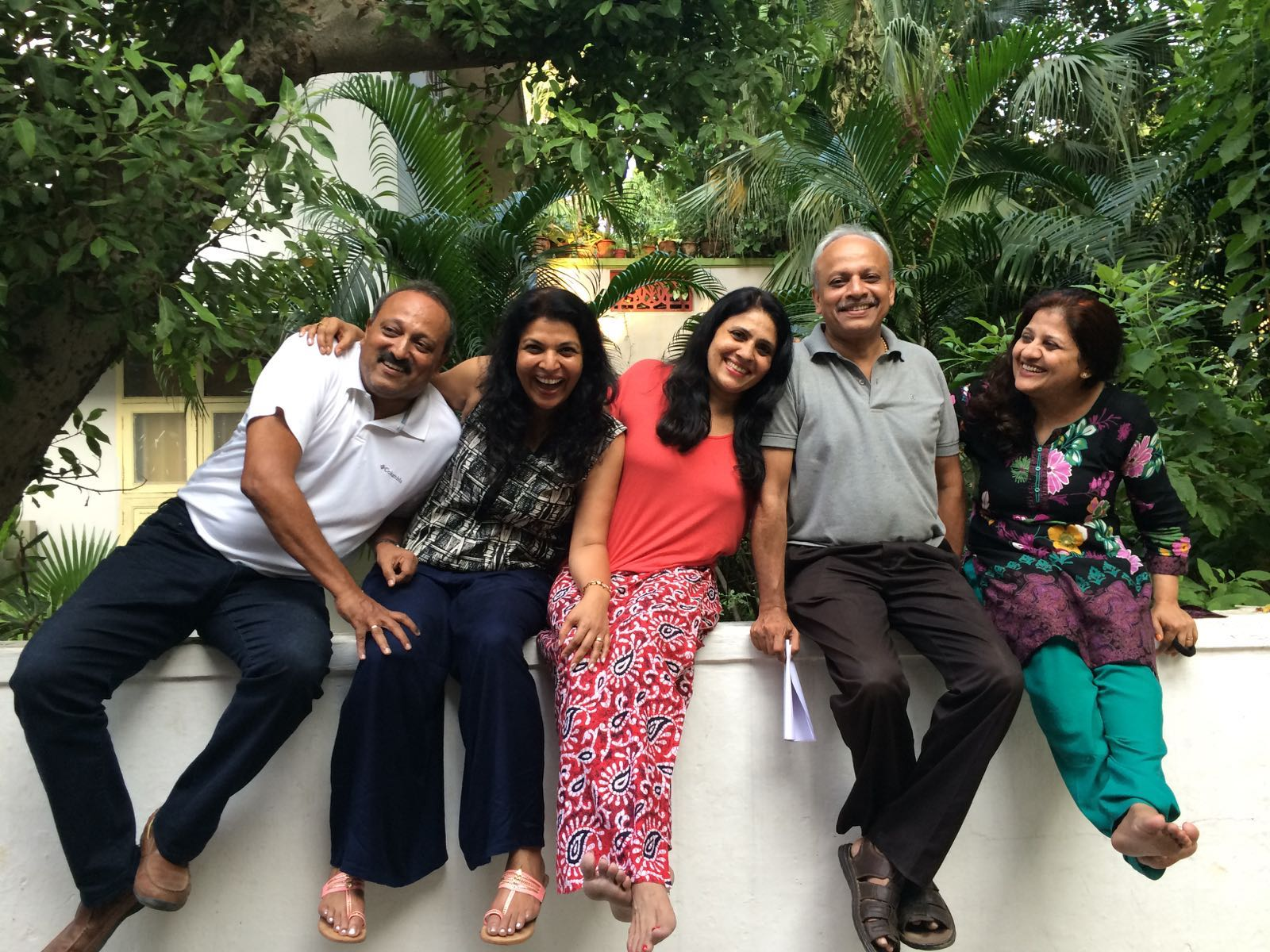

== Personal life ==
In 1953, M. O. Joseph married Kunjamma Joseph. They had five children.

== Filmography ==
A list of M. O. Joseph's films.

	Name of film	Banner	Direction	Year	Cast	Awards
1	Naadan Pennu	Navajeevan Films	K. S. Sethu Madhavan	1967	Prem Nazir, Sathyan, Sheela, Jayabharathi	
2	Thokkukal Kadha Parayunnu	Navajeevan Films	K. S. Sethu Madhavan	1968	Prem Nazir, Sathyan, Sheela	
3	Yakshi	Manjilas Films	K. S. Sethu Madhavan	1968	Sathyan, Sharada	
4	Adimakal	Manjilas Films	K. S. Sethu Madhavan	1969	Prem Nazir, Sathyan, Sheela, Sharada	Best Picture in Malayalam National Award for Best Feature Film
5	Kadalpalam	Manjilas Films	K. S. Sethu Madhavan	1969	Sathyan, Jayabharathi, K. P. Ummer	
6	Vazhve Mayam	Manjilas Films	K. S. Sethu Madhavan	1970	Sathyan, Sheela	
7	Aranazhika Neram	Manjilas Films	K. S. Sethu Madhavan	1970	Prem Nazir, Sathyan, Sheela, Ambika (Old), Kottarakkara	Best Director; Best Story; Best Actor
8	Anubhavangal Paalichakal	Manjilas Films	K. S. Sethu Madhavan	1971	Sathyan, Sheela	Best Picture in Malayalam
9	Devi	Manjilas Films	K. S. Sethu Madhavan	1972	Prem Nazir, Madhu, Sheela	
10	Punarjanmam	Manjilas Films	K. S. Sethu Madhavan	1972	Prem Nazir, Jayabharathi	Best Picture in Malayalam
11	Chukku	Manjilas Films	K. S. Sethu Madhavan	1973	Madhu, Sheela	
12	Kaliyugam	Manjilas Films	K. S. Sethu Madhavan	1973	Jayabharathi, Sudheer, Bahadoor	
13	Chattakkari	Manjilas Films	K. S. Sethu Madhavan	1974	Lakshmi, Mohan Sharma	Best Picture in Malayalam; Best Actress
14	Makkal	Manjilas Films	K. S. Sethu Madhavan	1975	Jayabharathi, Kaviyoor Ponnamma	
15	Chuvanna Sadhayakal	Manjilas Films	K. S. Sethu Madhavan	1975	Lakshmi, Mohan Sharma	
16	Missi	Manjilas Films	Thopil Bhasi	1976	Lakshmi, Mohan Sharma, KP Ummer	
17	Ponni	Manjilas Films	Thopil Bhasi	1976	Kamalahasan, Lakshmi	
18	Agninakshathram	Manjilas Films	A Vincent	1977	Lakshmi, Mohan Sharma	
19	Guruvayur Keshavan	Manjilas Films	Bharathan	1977	Jayabharathi, MG Soman, Adoor Bhasi	
20	Njaan Njaan Maathram	Manjilas Films	I. V. Sasi	1978	Madhu, Jayabharathi, Jose, Seema	Best Picture in Malayalam
21	Aniyara	Manjilas Films	Bharathan	1978	Soman, Padma	
22	Ezhunirangal	Manjilas Films	Jeasy	1979	Jose, Vidhubala	
23	Ivar	Manjilas Films	I. V. Sasi	1980	Sharada, Seema, Jose	
24	Parankimala	Manjilas Films	Bharathan	1981	Benny, Soorya, Rani Padmini	
25	Odukkam Thudakkam	Manjilas Films	Malayatoor Ramakrishnan	1982	Ratheesh, Kalaranjini, Rajkumar, Nanditha Bose, K. P. Ummer	
26	Eenam	Manjilas Films	Bharathan	1983	Venu Nagavally, Shanthi Krishna, Unni Mary	

== Awards ==
- Filmfare Award for Best Film - Malayalam - Adimakal (1969)
- Filmfare Award for Best Film - Malayalam - Vazhve Mayam (1970)

== Death ==
Joseph died on 8 January 2016 at his home in San Thomas, Chennai.
