= Melli Irani =

Indian cinematographer (1932-2026)

- Born: 5 August 1932; Bombay, Bombay Presidency, British India
- Died: 19 March 2026 (aged 93); Chennai, Tamil Nadu, India
- Occupation: Cinematographer
- Years active: 1962–1985
- Father: Aadhi M. Irani
- Awards: Kerala State Film Award for Best Cinematography (1971); Kerala Film Critics Association Award for Best Cinematographer (1984)

Melli Irani (5 August 1932 – 19 March 2026) was an Indian cinematographer from Mumbai. He worked predominantly in Malayalam film industry. Irani received the Kerala State Film Award for Best Cinematography in 1971. He won the 1984 Kerala Film Critics Association Award for Best Cinematographer for the film Vellam.

== Background ==
Melli Irani was born on 5 August 1932, in Bombay to Indian cinematographer Aadhi M. Irani, the cameraman for Bollywood's first sound film, Alam Ara (1931). He learned cinematography from his father, and became an independent cinematographer in 1962 with the Malayalam film Gnanasundari.

Irani spent his last years at his home in Chetpet, Chennai. He died in Chennai on 19 March 2026, at the age of 93.

== Contributions ==
After Gnanasundari, Irani did cinematography for the film Viyarppinte Vila (1962) by M. Krishnan Nair and Sathyabhaama (1963) by M. S. Mani. He worked the most with K. S. Sethumadhavan. He was the cinematographer for Sethumadhavan's films Sthanarthi Saramma (1966), Naadan Pennu (1967), Ollathumathi (1967), Bharyamar Sookshikkuka (1968), Thokkukal Kadha Parayunnu (1968), Yakshi (1968), Adimakal (1969), Kadalpalam (1969), Vazhve Mayam (1970), Kalpana (1970), Ammayenna Sthree (1970), Aranazhika Neram (1970), Line Bus (1971), Oru Penninte Katha (1971), Karakanakadal (1971), Inqulab Zindabbad (1971), Anubhavangal Paalichakal (1971) Devi (1972), Punarjanmam (1972), Panitheeratha Veedu (1973) and Chukku (1973). After that, he worked most with Hariharan. He was the cinematographer for Hariharan's films like Rajahamsam (1974), Bhoomidevi Pushpiniyayi (1974), Panchami (1976), Sarapancharam (1979), Edavazhiyile Poocha Minda Poocha (1979), Laava (1980), Muthuchippikal (1980), Valarthumrigangal (1981), Poocha Sanyasi (1981), Sreeman Sreemathi (1981), Anguram (1982), and Vellam (1985). He was also the cinematographer of Alibabayum 41 Kallanmaarum (1975), Ajayanum Vijayanum (1976), Theekkali (1981) and Keni (1982) by Sasi Kumar, Ananthashayanam (1972) and Kottaaram Vilkkaanundu (1975) by K. Sukumaran, Ente Mohangal Poovaninju (1982) and Aattuvanchi Ulanjappol (1984) by Bhadran, Vanadevatha (1976) by Yusufali Kechery, Sneham (1977) by A. Bhimsingh, Aazhi Alayaazhi (1978) by Mani Swamy and Yaksha Gaanam and Sikharangal (1979) by Sheela.

Irani was also the cinematographer for the 1963 Tamil film Konjum Kumari.

== Awards and honors ==
Irani received the Kerala State Film Award for Best Cinematography in 1971. In 1984, he won the Kerala Film Critics Association Award for Best Cinematographer for the film Vellam.

== Legacy ==
Writer Ravi Menon writes in his obituary that Melli Irani is one of the last of the talented individuals who gave direction to Malayalam cinema. Director Hariharan, who was a disciple of Melli Irani early in his film career, has been quoted as saying, "Irani was a genius who created a new grammar for the art of cinematography." "Irani is a cameraman who knows exactly what the director in me wants. We had a silent communication between us," says director Sethumadhavan.
