= Devi (1968 film) =

- Directed by: A. K. Velan
- Story by: A. K. Velan
- Produced by: A. K. Velan
- Starring: R. Muthuraman; Devika
- Cinematography: C. J. Mohan
- Music by: V. Dakshinamoorthy
- Production company: Arunachalam Pictures
- Release date: 27 July 1968
- Country: India
- Language: Tamil

Devi (/ðeɪvi/ transl. Goddess) is a 1968 Indian Tamil-language film written, produced and directed by A. K. Velan. It is a remake of Velan's 1961 Kannada film Kantheredu Nodu. The film stars R. Muthuraman and Devika. It was released on 27 July 1968, and failed at the box office.

== Cast ==
- R. Muthuraman
- Devika
- Vijayan
- Nagesh
- Major Sundarrajan
- Vanisri

== Production ==
A. K. Velan sold the copyrights to the 1961 Kannada film Kantheredu Nodu to T. E. Vasudevan for ₹1,000 (equivalent to ₹73,000 or US$760 in 2026), and Vasudevan produced a Malayalam remake Kavyamela (1965). After that film's success, Velan considered adapting the story in Tamil and bought the rights back from Vasudevan for ₹5,000 (equivalent to ₹360,000 or US$3,800 in 2026). The film was originally titled Amudhum Thenum (transl. Nectar and honey) but later retitled Devi as Velan felt the former title would not be understood by common audience, hence he opted for a simpler title. Cinematography was handled by C. J. Mohan.

== Soundtrack ==
The music was composed by V. Dakshinamoorthy, with lyrics by Palladam Manickam. The songs are reused from Kavyamela.

Track listing
No.	Title	Singer(s)	Length
1.	"Annaiyin Madiyil"	T. M. Soundararajan
2.	"Irul Paadhi, Oli Paadhi Padaiththaan" (male)	T. M. Soundararajan
3.	"Chinna Kuzhandhai Vizhikalile"	T. M. Soundararajan
4.	"Annai Un Sannidhi Naadi Vandhen"	T. M. Soundararajan
5.	"Irul Paadhi, Oli Paadhi Amaiththaan" (female)	P. Susheela
6.	"Devi Sri Devi"	P. B. Sreenivas
7.	"Thiththikkum Muththamizhe"	T. M. Soundararajan, P. Susheela

== Release and reception ==
Devi was released on 27 July 1968. Unlike the Kannada and Malayalam versions, it became a box office failure.
