= Julie (1975 film) =

- Film poster
- Directed by: K. S. Sethumadhavan
- Written by: Inder Raj Anand (Dialogue)
- Screenplay by: Chakrapani
- Produced by: B. Nagi Reddi-Chakrapani
- Starring: Lakshmi; Vikram Makandar
- Cinematography: Roy P. L.
- Edited by: M. S. Money
- Music by: Rajesh Roshan
- Production company: Vijaya Productions
- Distributed by: Vijaya Productions
- Release date: 18 March 1975
- Running time: 145 minutes
- Country: India
- Language: Hindi

Julie is a 1975 Indian Hindi-language romantic drama film directed by K. S. Sethumadhavan and written by Chakrapani. The film stars Lakshmi in the title role (in her Hindi film debut). It also stars Vikram Makandar, Nadira, Rita Bhaduri, Om Prakash, Utpal Dutt and Sridevi, in her first significant Hindi role. The film was a critical and commercial success. It is a remake of the Malayalam film Chattakari (1974), which also stars Lakshmi as the lead in her Malayalam film debut. She would star in yet another remake of the film, the Telugu film Miss Julie Prema Katha (1975).

Lakshmi did not act in the Kannada remake, Julie, released in 2006, which had Ramya in the title role as and Dino Morea as the leading man. She also declined the role of Julie's mother in the Malayalam remake titled Chattakari (2012), stating that she wanted the audience to remember her as the young and beautiful Julie; the title role went to Shamna Kasim. Actress Urvashi portrayed the role of Julie in its Tamil remake Oh Maane Maane (1984). The remake rights of this film are now owned by Glamour Eyes Films.

== Plot ==
This film depicts the restrictive social conventions regarding inter-religion marriage and pre-marital pregnancy in India. Julie is a Christian Anglo-Indian girl with a loving, but alcoholic father, a dominating mother, a younger brother and sister. She falls in love with her best friend, Usha Bhattacharya's brother Shashi Bhattacharya, a Hindu Brahmin boy. The lovers consummate their relationship, which leaves her pregnant. Shashi goes away to the city for corporate job, unaware of her pregnancy. Her mother is distraught when Julie tells her about the pregnancy. They do not tell the rest of the family. Her mother thinks about getting Julie an abortion, but Ruby Aunty, a devout Christian, talks her out of it. Julie is sent away to have her baby in secret. The rest of the family is told that Julie got a job in another town. After the baby's birth, Julie's mother arranges for the child to be left in an orphanage, and demands that Julie return home and forget about the baby.

When Julie returns home, her father has died. She is now the primary breadwinner of the family. Later, she runs into Shashi and tells him everything. He then asks to marry her, but his mother, Devki, objects to the marriage as Julie is of a different faith. She blames Julie for seducing her son and having their baby. Julie's mother does not want the union either, as it will be an inter-faith marriage, and she wants to return to England. However, the wisdom of Shashi's father prevails as he confronts the mothers' prejudices regarding caste and religion, and urges them both to accept their grandchild. The film ends with the mothers offering their blessing to the young couple, and Julie's mother promising her grandson she will "never leave him."

== Cast ==
- Lakshmi as Julie
- Vikram Makandar as Shashi Bhattacharya
- Nadira as Margaret "Maggie", Julie's mother
- Om Prakash as Morris, Julie's father
- Rita Bhaduri as Usha Bhattacharya, Shashi's sister
- Achala Sachdev as Devki Bhattacharya, Shashi's mother
- Utpal Dutt as Mr. Bhattacharya, Usha and Shashi's father
- Sridevi as Irene, Julie's younger sister
- Sulochana as Ruby Aunty
- Jalal Agha as Richard "Richie"
- Rajendra Nath as Rahim, store owner

== Music ==
The film's soundtrack won Rajesh Roshan his first Filmfare Award, for Filmfare Award for Best Music Director. Julie was one of the top three best-selling soundtrack albums of 1975, along with Sholay and Sanyasi. A remixed cover version of "Dil Kya Kare" sung by Shaan appeared in the 1996 album Dance Masti. All Hindi lyrics were by Anand Bakshi, while the lyrics of “My Heart Is Beating” were written by Harindranath Chattopadhyay.

According to film and music expert Rajesh Subramanian Dil kya kare was penned by lyricist Anand Bakshi in less than ten minutes when the tune was played to him by composer Rajesh Roshan and his assistants. had one of the first English songs in an Indian film, "My Heart is Beating", sung by Preeti Sagar.

Song	Singer
"Dil Kya Kare"	Kishore Kumar
"Bhool Gaya Sab Kuch, Yaad Nahin Kuch"	Kishore Kumar, Lata Mangeshkar
"Yeh Raaten Nayi Purani"	Lata Mangeshkar
"Sancha Naam Tera, Tu Shyam Mera"	Usha Mangeshkar, Asha Bhosle
"My Heart Is Beating"	Preeti Sagar

== Awards and nominations ==
Year	Award	Category	Recipient(s)	Result
1976	Filmfare Awards	Best Actress	Lakshmi	Won
1976	Filmfare Awards	Best Supporting Actress	Nadira	Won
1976	Filmfare Awards	Best Music Director	Rajesh Roshan	Won
1976	Filmfare Awards	Best Female Playback Singer	Preeti Sagar (for "My Heart is Beating")	Nominated
1976	Filmfare Awards	Special Award	Preeti Sagar (for "My Heart is Beating")	Won
1976	Bengal Film Journalists' Association Awards	Most Outstanding Work of the Year	Lakshmi	Won
1976	Bengal Film Journalists' Association Awards	Best Supporting Actress	Nadira	Won
1976	Bengal Film Journalists' Association Awards	Best Music Director	Rajesh Roshan	Won
1976	Bengal Film Journalists' Association Awards	Best Lyricist	Anand Bakshi for "Dil Kya Kare"	Won
