= Julie (2006 film) =

2006 Kannada-language film

- DVD cover
- Directed by: Poornima Mohan
- Story by: Pamman
- Produced by: KCN Mohan
- Starring: Ramya; Dino Morea; Sundeep Malani
- Cinematography: T. Janardhan
- Edited by: Manohar
- Music by: Rajesh Ramanath
- Release date: 12 May 2006
- Running time: 145 minutes
- Country: India
- Language: Kannada

Julie is a 2006 Indian Kannada-language film directed by Poornima Mohan. It is a remake of the 1975 Hindi film of the same name, which is itself a remake of the 1974 Malayalam film Chattakkari. It stars Bollywood actor Dino Morea marking his Kannada debut and Ramya as a young woman that discovers that she has gotten pregnant after a one-night stand with her childhood sweetheart.

== Plot ==
Plot

Julie is a devout Christian woman raised in a conservative household where religion creates firm barriers around identity, morality, and relationships. From childhood, she knows Shashi, a Hindu man from the same locality. Though they grow close over time, their different religious backgrounds remain an unspoken barrier that prevents open commitment and acceptance by either community.

As young adults, Shashi actively pursues Julie and reassures her of his affection while repeatedly reminding her that their relationship cannot have a future unless their religious differences are resolved. Their bond deepens emotionally and gradually becomes intimate. They engage in a secret sexual relationship, hidden from family and community, which strengthens Julie’s emotional attachment to Shashi and weakens the boundaries she was taught to maintain.

Julie becomes pregnant as a result of this relationship. The pregnancy places her in an extremely vulnerable position. Her Christian community offers no understanding, and she fears shame, rejection, and isolation. During this period, Julie depends heavily on Shashi for support. He makes it clear that he will only accept her and the child openly if she abandons Christianity and adopts Hinduism, presenting religious conversion as the only path to legitimacy, security, and family life.

Julie’s brother, Robert, becomes aware that something is wrong and confronts her about her isolation and distress. Robert urges Julie to leave the situation and offers to take her away to start over, but Julie feels emotionally bound and trapped by her circumstances. His warnings go unheeded as Julie believes staying is the only way to secure a future for her child.

After intense inner conflict and emotional pressure, Julie agrees to convert to Hinduism. With the religious barrier removed, she moves in with Shashi, and their relationship becomes socially acceptable within his community. Their child is acknowledged and raised within Shashi’s religious and cultural framework.

The story ends with Julie, Shashi, and their child living together as a family. Julie assumes a new identity as a Hindu wife and mother, having left behind her former faith. Though the family appears outwardly settled and happy, Julie’s journey reflects how intimacy, pressure, and unequal power shaped the course of her life.

== Cast ==
- Ramya as Julie
- Dino Morea as Shashi
- Sundeep Malani as Mr. Gupta
- Sihi Kahi Chandru
- Ramesh Bhat
- Chitra Shenoy
- Sowmya H D

== Music ==
Rajesh Ramanath had composed the songs for Julie, which he reused from the 1975 film.

Track listing
No.	Title	Singer(s)	Length
1.	"Nanna Ninna Pritiyalli"	Kunal Ganjawala	3:48
2.	"My Heart is Beating"	Chaitra	5:50
3.	"Navanitha Chora"	Priyadarshini	4:13
4.	"Dhava Dhava Yeh Eyali"	Chaitra, Udit Narayan	5:07
5.	"Ee Hadu"	Priyadarshini	4:50
Total length:			39:34

== Reception ==
A critic from Rediff.com wrote that "The final product simply lacks the impact of the original". A critic from Deccan Herald wrote that "This remake cannot be compared to the original. It lacks the original’s intensity and tempo". On the contrary, a critic from Chitraloka.com wrote that "The subject of 'Juilie' is still prevalent in our society. That is why we recommend this film to watch".
