= Achanum Bappayum =

1972 film

- Directed by: K. S. Sethumadhavan
- Written by: K. T. Muhammed
- Produced by: C. C. Baby
- Starring: K. P. Ummer; Jayabharathi; Kottarakkara Sreedharan Nair; Adoor Bhasi and Bhahadoor
- Cinematography: Namas
- Edited by: P. B. Narayanan
- Music by: Devarajan; Lyrics: Vayalar Ramavarma
- Release date: 21 July 1972
- Country: India
- Language: Malayalam

Achanum Bappayum is a 1972 Malayalam film directed by K. S. Sethumadhavan and written by K. T. Muhammed. It stars K. P. Ummer, Jayabharathi, Kottarakkara Sreedharan Nair, Adoor Bhasi and Baby Sumathi in important roles. It won the Nargis Dutt Award for Best Feature Film on National Integration. K. J. Yesudas won the National Film Award for Best Male Playback Singer and Vayalar Ramavarma won the National Film Award for Best Lyrics for the song " Manushyan Mathangale".

== Plot ==
Krishnan, a Hindu man, is released from prison after completing his sentence for killing his wife. He starts staying with his sister who is a follower of Sree Narayana Guru and her husband who is a communist. One night a Muslim woman comes to their house and dies leaving a newborn baby girl. Krishnan decides to adopt the child even amid protests by his sister, brother-in-law and Muslim and Hindu communities. He allows the girl to learn and follow the religion of Islam. He faces more problems when the girl becomes an adult and falls in love with his nephew.

== Cast ==
- Kottarakkara Sreedharan Nair as Krishnan
- K. P. Ummer as Mustafa
- Jayabharathi as Aamina
- Adoor Bhasi as Madhavan
- Ayyappan Pillai
- Bahadoor as Abdulla
- Vincent as Devadas
- Master Raghu as Devadas
- Vijayakumari
- Meenakumari
- Philomina as Pathumma
- M. K. Kamalam
- Baby Sumathi as Aamina
- Sreemoolanagaram Vijayan

== Soundtrack ==
The music was composed by G. Devarajan and the lyrics were written by Vayalar Ramavarma.

No.	Song	Singers	Lyrics	Length (m:ss)
1	"Daivame Kaithozhaam"	P. Madhuri	Vayalar Ramavarma	
2	"Kanninum Kannaadikkum"	P. Susheela	Vayalar Ramavarma	
3	"Kulikkumbololichu Njan"	K. J. Yesudas	Vayalar Ramavarma	
4	"Manushyan Mathangale"	K. J. Yesudas	Vayalar Ramavarma	
5	"Mohathinte Mukham"	K. J. Yesudas	Vayalar Ramavarma	
6	"Oru Matham Oru Jathi"	P. Madhuri, P. B. Sreenivas, Chorus	Vayalar Ramavarma	
7	"Ponninte Kolusumittu"	P. Madhuri, Chorus	Vayalar Ramavarma	

== Awards ==
National Film Award - 1972

Best Playback Singer - K J Yesudas

Best lyricist - Vayalar Ramavarma
