= Kantheredu Nodu =

- Directed by: T. V. Singh Takur
- Screenplay by: G. V. Iyer
- Story by: A. K. Velan
- Produced by: A. K. Velan
- Starring: Rajkumar; Leelavathi; T. N. Balakrishna; Rajasree
- Cinematography: B. Dorairaj
- Edited by: Venkataram; V. N. Raghupathi
- Music by: G. K. Venkatesh
- Production company: Aranachelam Studios
- Release date: 21 August 1961
- Country: India
- Language: Kannada

Kantheredu Nodu ( transl. Open your eyes and see) is a 1961 Indian Kannada-language film, directed by T. V. Singh Thakur and produced by A. K. Velan. The film stars Rajkumar, Leelavathi, T. N. Balakrishna and Rajasree. The film was remade in Malayalam in 1965 as Kavyamela and the producer of Kantheredu Nodu, Velan, subsequently remade it in Tamil in 1968 as Devi. Velan had sold the copyrights of the Kannada film to Malayalam producer T. E. Vasudevan for ₹1,000. Subsequently, he purchased the rights back for ₹5,000 to remake it in Tamil as Devi, which bombed at the box office.

== Cast ==
- Rajkumar as Gopanna
- Leelavathi
- T. N. Balakrishna as Dasanna
- Rajasree
- Narasimharaju
- B. Ramadevi
- G. V. Iyer
- M. Jayashree
- Bharadwaj
- Papamma
- Eshwarappa
- Vijayakumari
- Ganapathi Bhat
- Vasanthi
- H. Krishna Shastry
- Kuppuraj
- Veerabhadrappa
- Revathi
- Shakunthala

== Soundtrack ==
The music was composed by G. K. Venkatesh.

Song	Singers	Lyrics	Length
"Bangaradodave"	P. B. Srinivas	G. V. Iyer	01:50
"Bangaradodave Beke"	P. B. Srinivas	G. V. Iyer	02:42
"Hagalu Irulu"	P. B. Srinivas	G. V. Iyer	01:29
"Hennina Mele"	P. B. Srinivas, S. Janaki	G. V. Iyer	03:24
"Kallu Sakkare"	P. B. Srinivas	Purandaradasa	02:54
"Kannadada Makkalella"	G.K.Venkatesh	G. V. Iyer	03:17
"Ninagidu Nyayave"	P. B. Srinivas	G. V. Iyer	01:26
"Sharanu Kaveri"	P. B. Srinivas	G. V. Iyer	01:27
"Sigadhanna"	P. B. Srinivas	G. V. Iyer	01:39
"Siriye Karunada"	P. B. Srinivas	G. V. Iyer	01:25
"Yedavidare Naa"	S. Janaki, L. R. Eswari	G. V. Iyer	04:50
