= Vazhve Mayam =

- Poster
- Directed by: K. S. Sethumadhavan
- Screenplay by: Thoppil Bhasi
- Story by: P. Ayyaneth
- Based on: Vazhve Mayam by P. Ayyaneth
- Produced by: M. O. Joseph
- Starring: Sathyan; Sheela
- Cinematography: Melli Irani
- Edited by: M. S. Mani
- Music by: Devarajan
- Production company: Manjilas Films
- Release date: 14 November 1970
- Running time: 153 minutes
- Country: India
- Language: Malayalam

Vazhve Mayam (lit. 'Life is an illusion') is a 1970 Indian Malayalam-language drama film directed by K. S. Sethumadhavan and written by Thoppil Bhasi, based on the novel of the same name by P. Ayyaneth. It stars Sathyan, and also features Sheela, Sankaradi, K. P. Ummer, Bahadoor, Adoor Bhasi, K. P. A. C. Lalitha, Khadeeja, N. Govindan Kutty, Muthukulam Raghavan Pillai, C. A. Balan, Kuttan Pillai and Philomina.

Sankaradi won the Kerala State Film Award for Second Best Actor for his performance in the film. The film was screened as part of the Sathyan retrospective at the 17th International Film Festival of Kerala held at Thiruvananthapuram.

== Cast ==
- Sathyan as Sudhi (Sudhindharan Nair)
- Sheela as Sarala, Sarala's daughter (double role)
- Sankaradi as Neelakantappillai
- K. P. Ummer as Sasidaharan Nair, Sudhi's friend
- Bahadoor as Kuttappan, Sudhi's neighbour
- Adoor Bhasi as Achuthan Nair, Sarala's father
- K. P. A. C. Lalitha as Gowri, Kuttappan's wife
- Khadeeja as Kamalkshi, Sasidharan's wife
- Muthukulam Raghavan Pillai as Panchayat member
- Philomina as Parukutty
- C. A. Balan
- Paul Vengola
- Paravoor Bharathan as Swami
- N. Govindan Kutty as Ramachandran Nair
- P. R. Menon as Raghavan
- Kochi Ammini
- Kuttan Pillai

== Production ==
The film was shot at Arunachalam Studios and Revathi Studios.

== Soundtrack ==
The music was composed by G. Devarajan and the lyrics were written by Vayalar Ramavarma.

No.	Song	Singers	Lyrics	Length (m:ss)
1	"Bhagavaanoru Kuravanayi"	P. Leela	Vayalar Ramavarma	
2	"Chalanam Chalanam"	K. J. Yesudas	Vayalar Ramavarma	
3	"Ee Yugam Kaliyugam"	K. J. Yesudas	Vayalar Ramavarma	
4	"Kaattum Poy"	P. Madhuri	Vayalar Ramavarma	
5	"Kalyanasougandhika Poonkaavanathil"	P. Susheela	Vayalar Ramavarma	
6	"Seethaadevi Swayamvaram"	P. Susheela, P. Jayachandran	Vayalar Ramavarma	

== Reception ==
Vazhve Mayam was a major commercial success at the box office.

== Remakes ==
The movie was remade in Telugu as Edadugula Bandham (1985) and as Aap Ki Kasam (1974) in Hindi.

== Awards ==
- Filmfare Award for Best Film - Malayalam won by M. O. Joseph (1970)
