= Ananthasayanam (1972 film) =

- Directed by: K. Suku
- Screenplay by: Jagathy N. K. Achari
- Produced by: K. Suku
- Starring: Sheela; Jayabharathi; Prema
- Cinematography: Melli Irani
- Edited by: G. Venkittaraman
- Music by: K. Raghavan
- Production company: Bhavanachithra
- Distributed by: Bhavanachithra
- Release date: 27 October 1972
- Country: India
- Language: Malayalam

Ananthasayanam is a 1972 Indian Malayalam film, directed and produced by K. Suku. The film stars Sheela, Jayabharathi, Adoor Bhasi and Prema in the lead roles. The film had musical score by K. Raghavan.

== Cast ==
- Sheela
- Jayabharathi
- Adoor Bhasi
- Prema
- T. R. Omana
- Mancheri Chandran
- Bahadoor
- K. P. Ummer
- Kottarakkara Sreedharan Nair
- Meena
- N. Govindankutty
- Nellikode Bhaskaran
- Radhamani
- Raghava Menon
- Sujatha
- Thodupuzha Radhakrishnan
- Chandramohan

== Soundtrack ==
The music was composed by K. Raghavan and the lyrics were written by Sreekumaran Thampi.

No.	Song	Singers	Lyrics	Length (m:ss)
1	"Dukhathin Gaagulthaamalayil"	B. Vasantha	Sreekumaran Thampi	
2	"Maanava Hridayam"	P. Jayachandran	Sreekumaran Thampi	
3	"Maarivil Gopuravaathil"	K. P. Brahmanandan	Sreekumaran Thampi	
4	"Sandhyaa Megham"	S. Janaki	Sreekumaran Thampi	
5	"Udayachandrike"	S. Janaki	Sreekumaran Thampi	
