= Kaalam Maari Kadha Maari =

- Promotional poster designed by P. N. Menon
- Directed by: M. Krishnan Nair
- Screenplay by: Devan. V Siddique Shameer
- Story by: Moidu Padiyath
- Produced by: T. E. Vasudevan
- Starring: Mammootty; Shobhana; Adoor Bhasi; Lalu Alex; Thilakan
- Edited by: N. gopalakrishnan
- Music by: A. T. Ummer
- Distributed by: Murali films
- Release date: 29 May 1987
- Country: India
- Language: Malayalam

Kaalam Maari Kadha Maari is a 1987 Malayalam film. It was directed by M. Krishnan Nair, written by Devan V. and starring Mammootty, Shobhana, Adoor Bhasi, and Lalu Alex. The film was produced by T. E. Vasudevan. It was the last film of both the director and the producer.

== Plot ==
Ummu Kholzu is married to Kamarudeen, whose hands are paralyzed. Ummu, hailing from a poor background, had to marry him against her wishes. He descends from a rich, aristocrat family. She was in love with Razzak, her neighbor, but her father objected to their relationship and made her marry Kamarudeen. After the wedding, she suffers mental torture and insults from her father-in-law and sister-in-law. Fed up after seeing her sufferings, Kamarudeen leaves his house along with her. At her house, Kamar discovers Ummu's past affair with Razak and becomes suspicious.

Razak's wife dies in an accident. Kamar realizes his mistake and decides to save Ummu's life as he believes that Razzak is more suitable for her. Kamar gives her talaq and moves back to his house. His father asks him to take back Ummu. Razzak and Ummu get engaged, however Ummu is not ready to accept Razzak this time as Kamar is her husband. On the day of the wedding, she flees and commits suicide. Kamar sees her jumping from a cliff into the waterfalls and also slips and falls in while trying to save her.

== Cast ==
- Mammootty as Kamarudden
- Shobhana as Ummu Kolzu
- Adoor Bhasi as Mustafa
- Sudha Chandran as Arifa
- Mukesh as Yusaf
- Lalu Alex as Razzak
- Mala Aravindan as Koya
- Mamukkoya as Pareed
- Sukumari as Alimma
- Ragini as Tahira
- Thilakan as Hameed
- T. P. Madhavan as Mammali
- Balan K. Nair as Aliyarukunji
- Santhakumari
- Valsala Menon as Kamarudheen's mother
- Sankaradi as Sulaiman
