= Inqulab Zindabbad =

- Poster
- Directed by: K. S. Sethumadhavan
- Written by: S. L. Puram Sadanandan
- Screenplay by: S. L. Puram Sadanandan
- Produced by: K. S. R. Moorthy
- Starring: Sathyan; Madhu; Sheela; Jayabharathi
- Cinematography: Melli Irani
- Edited by: T. R. Sreenivasalu
- Music by: G. Devarajan
- Production company: Chithranjali
- Distributed by: Rajashree Pictures
- Release date: 30 September 1971
- Country: India
- Language: Malayalam

Inqulab Zindabbad is a 1971 Indian Malayalam-language film directed by K. S. Sethumadhavan and produced by K. S. R. Moorthy. The film stars Sathyan, Madhu, Sheela and Jayabharathi in the lead roles. The film has musical score by G. Devarajan.

== Cast ==
- Sathyan as Venugopalan
- Madhu as Shreedharan
- Sheela as Rajamma
- Jayabharathi as Vasanthi
- Adoor Bhasi as Panjali Raman Nair
- Prema as Devaki
- Sankaradi as Neerkunnam Neelaambaran
- Shobha as As Child artist
- Varghese
- G. K. Pillai as Circle Inspector
- Janardanan
- Kuttan Pillai
- Menon
- N. Govindankutty as District Secretary
- Nambiar
- Nellikode Bhaskaran as Govindan
- P. O. Thomas
- Panicker
- Panjabi
- Paravoor Bharathan as Head Constable Mathan
- Philomina as Narayani
- Roja Ramani
- Susheela
- Vasu
- Veeran as Adv. Cherian

== Soundtrack ==
The music was composed by G. Devarajan and the lyrics were written by O. V. Usha and Vayalar Ramavarma.

| No. | Song | Singers | Lyrics | Length (m:ss) |
|---|---|---|---|---|
| 1 | "Aarude Manassile" | P. Leela | O. V. Usha | |
| 2 | "Alakadalil Kidannoru" | P. Madhuri, K. P. Brahmanandan | Vayalar Ramavarma | |
| 3 | "Inquilab Zindabad" | P. Jayachandran, Chorus | Vayalar Ramavarma | |
| 4 | "Pushyaraaga Mothiramittoru" | K. J. Yesudas | Vayalar Ramavarma | |
