= Stri =

- DVD cover
- Directed by: K. S. Sethumadhavan
- Written by: Palagummi Padmaraju
- Story by: Palagummi Padmaraju
- Produced by: NFDC; Doordarshan
- Starring: Vijay; Rohini
- Cinematography: S. Saravanan
- Edited by: D. Rajagopal
- Music by: L. Vaidyanathan
- Release date: 1995
- Running time: 120 minutes
- Country: India
- Language: Telugu

Stri (transl. Woman) is a 1994 Indian Telugu-language drama film featuring Thalaivasal Vijay and Rohini. It was written by Palagummi Padmaraju with screenplay and direction by K. S. Sethumadhavan. The film garnered two National Film Awards, two Nandi Awards and was showcased in the Indian Panorama section, International Film Festival of India and 2nd Prague International Film Festival.

== Plot ==
The film deals with a lively and poignant village woman longing for the love of her unpredictable paramour.

== Cast ==
- Vijay as Paddalu
- Rohini as Rangi
- P. L. Narayana
- K. K. Sarma
- Bachoori
- Gopalaraju
- S. Bheemeswara Rao
- Divya
- Padma

== Reception ==
Reviewing the film at the International Film Festival of India, S. R. Ashok Kumar of The Hindu wrote that "The internal conflict between a man and a woman, the feeling for each other, the emotions with which they wait for each other, all these are shown in a mature way by the director".

== Awards ==
National Film Awards

- Best Feature Film in Telugu – 1995
- National Film Award – Special Mention – Rohini

Nandi Awards - 1995

- Special Jury Award for Best Performance - Rohini
- Special Jury Award for Direction - K. S. Sethumadhavan
