= Kadalpalam =

- Poster
- Directed by: K. S. Sethumadhavan
- Written by: K. T. Mohammed
- Produced by: M. O. Joseph
- Starring: Sathyan; Prem Nazeer; Jayabharathi; Sheela
- Cinematography: Melli Irani
- Edited by: M. S. Mani
- Music by: Devarajan
- Production company: Manjilas Films
- Release date: 25 July 1969
- Country: India
- Language: Malayalam

Kadalpalam is a 1969 Malayalam language film directed by K. S. Sethumadhavan, written by K. T. Mohammed and produced by M. O. Joseph under Manjilas Films. The film stars Sathyan, Prem Nazir and Jayabharathi with Sheela, Bahadoor and Adoor Bhasi in other prominent roles. The film features original songs composed by Devarajan, cinematography by Melli Irani.

The film is an adaptation of the critically acclaimed professional stage play of the same name authored by the renowned dramatist K. T. Mohammed, which is an adaptation of the 1940 Hindi film Prem Nagar. The film revolves around Narayana Kaimal, a successful lawyer, who loses his eyesight and has to rely on his servant Appu. Then after a while he regains his eyesight but pretends to be blind in order to test his children.

The film was released on 25 July 1969. The film was critically well received and was a box office hit. The film won 5 film awards in the inaugural Kerala State Film Awards for Best Dialogues (K. T. Mohammed), Best Actor (Sathyan), for Best Music Director (Devarajan), Best Lyrics (Vayalar Ramavarma), Best Singer (P. Leela) The film is probably best remembered for the performance by Sathyan who received the first ever State Award for Best Actor for his memorable performance in the film. Noted singer S. P. Balasubrahmanyam debuted in Malayalam cinema with this film. The film was remade in Hindi as Zameen Aasmaan (1972).

== Plot ==
The story revolves round the family of Narayana Kaimal, a leading advocate who loses his eyesight. Kaimal is a strict disciplinarian and always tries to impose his thoughts and principles on his children and fellow beings. This creates a conflict with others. Kaimal's elder son Raghu dislikes the obstinate nature of his father leading to constant conflicts between the two. Kaimal's younger son Prabhakaran who is an advocate and daughter Geetha try to obey their father, but at times they only pretend to obey him. Kaimal now sees the world through the eyes of his faithful servant Appu.

Prabhakaran is in love with Sarala, daughter of Kaimal's servant Sreedharan Pillai. Geetha is in love with Murali, the adopted son of Kadeeja, who lives in the neighbourhood. Appu is warned against telling anything about the love affairs to Kaimal. Raghu believes that they lost their mother at very young age only because of the arrogance of their father. Raghu is married to Prashanthi who was his father's choice.

Raghu shows his protest by his rude behavior towards his wife. Kaimal demands to give back the tile factory which he had given to Raghu. But Raghu refuses to part with the factory. Kaimal files a court case against his son.

Geetha marries Murali and Raghu supports them. Kaimal regains his eyesight and is surprised by what happened while he was blind. He decides to pretend to be blind so as to learn more about his children. Only Appu is aware that Kaimal is now not blind. Kaimal plots to stop the marriage of Prabhakaran. He offers partnership of the factory to the manager Nanukuttan Nair if he could help conduct the marriage of his son, who is a police inspector, with Sarala. Nair agrees to carry out the crooked plan.

The verdict of the court goes against Kaimal. But Prabhakaran hides this from his father. Prabhakaran does not allow Geetha to meet Kaimal and when Kadeeja come and raises voice for justice, Kaimal hits her. Murali attacks Kaimal and now all realise that Kaimal is not blind. Prabhakaran discovers his father's scheme. Kaimal's children turn against him. Unable to stand the setback and the thought that he had failed in his attempts to control his children with an iron hand he suffers a fatal heart attack.

== Cast ==
- Sathyan as Narayana Kaimal/Raghu (double role)
- Prem Nazir as Murali
- K. P. Ummer as Prabhakaran
- Sheela as Sarala
- Jayabharathi as Geetha
- Adoor Bhasi as Nanukkuttan Nair
- Sankaradi as Sreedharan Pillai
- Adoor Bhavani as Khadeeja
- Bahadoor as Appu
- Kuttyedathi Vilasini
- N. Govindankutty as Karthavu
- Thodupuzha Radhakrishnan as Police Inspector
- Vijayachandrika as Prasanthi

== Soundtrack ==
The film had four songs penned by Vayalar Ramavarma and set to tune by Devarajan. S. P. Balasubrahmanyam debuted in Malayalam with this film. It was R. K. Shekhar who recommended S.P. Balasubrahmanyam. to Devarajan. P Leela received the first Kerala State Award for Best Female Singer for Ujjayiniyile Gaayika.

No.	Song	Singers	Lyrics	Length (m:ss)
1	"Ee Kadalum Marukadalum"	S. P. Balasubrahmanyam	Vayalar Ramavarma	
2	"Inne Pol"	K. J. Yesudas, B. Vasantha	Vayalar Ramavarma	
3	"Kasthoorithailamittu"	P. Madhuri, Chorus	Vayalar Ramavarma	
4	"Ujjayiniyile"	P. Leela	Vayalar Ramavarma	

== Reception ==
The Hindu wrote, "Sathyan excelled in his double role. The film dispensed with comic scenes. Deviating from their usual comedy roles, Bahadur and Adoor Bhasi performed character roles in the film. Bahadur's performance as the faithful servant who is under pressure to act against his conscience is considered as one of the best he has essayed. Prem Nazir, Sheela, Jayabharathi and Adoor Bhavani also performed their roles impressively.

== Accolades ==
Award	Category	Nominee(s)	Result	Ref.
Kerala State Film Awards	Best Actor	Sathyan	Won	
Kerala State Film Awards	Best Music Director	Devarajan	Won	
Kerala State Film Awards	Best Play Back Singer	P. Leela	Won	
Kerala State Film Awards	Best Script	K. T. Mohammed	Won	
Kerala State Film Awards	Best Lyrics	Vayalar Ramavarma	Won	
