= Alibabayum 41 Kallanmaarum =

1975 film

- Directed by: J. Sasikumar
- Written by: S. L. Puram Sadanandan (dialogues)
- Screenplay by: S. L. Puram Sadanandan
- Produced by: M. J. Kurien
- Starring: Prem Nazir; Jayabharathi; KP Ummer; Vidhubala; Bahadoor; Adoor Bhasi; Thikkurissy Sukumaran Nair
- Cinematography: Melli Irani
- Edited by: G. Venkittaraman
- Music by: G. Devarajan
- Production company: Supriya
- Distributed by: Supriya
- Release date: 7 August 1975
- Country: India
- Language: Malayalam

Alibabayum 41 Kallanmaarum (Malayalam: ആലിബാബയും 41 കള്ളന്മാരും) is a 1975 Indian Malayalam-language film, directed by J. Sasikumar and produced by M. J. Kurien. The film stars Prem Nazir, Jayabharathi, Bahadoor, KP Ummer, Vidhubala, Adoor Bhasi and Thikkurissy Sukumaran Nair. The film has musical score by G. Devarajan.

== Cast ==
- Prem Nazir as Alibaba
- Jayabharathi as Marjiyana
- Vidhubala as Fatima/Laila, daughter of a merchant
- K. P. Ummer as Sherkhan Abu Hassan, chief of the thieves
- Bahadoor
- Adoor Bhasi
- Thikkurissy Sukumaran Nair as Brother of Fatima/Laila
- Sreelatha Namboothiri
- T. R. Omana as Naseema Begam, mother of Alibaba and Qasim
- T. S. Muthaiah as Shah Alam Parvaz, father of Marjiyana
- Jyothi Lakshmi
- Meena
- Vijayalalitha

== Soundtrack ==
All lyrics are written by Vayalar Ramavarma except where noted; all music is composed by G. Devarajan.

No.	Title	Lyrics	Artist(s)	Length
1.	"Akilum Kanmadavum"		K. J. Yesudas
2.	"Arabia"		P. Madhuri
3.	"Arayil Thankavaal"		P. Madhuri, Chorus
4.	"Maappilappaattile Maathalakkani"		P. Jayachandran, Latha Raju
5.	"Ramzanile Chandrikayo"		P. Jayachandran
6.	"Shararaanthal Vilakkin"		L. R. Eswari, Choir
7.	"Suvarnarekha"	P. Bhaskaran	P. Madhuri
8.	"Yakshi Njaanoru Yakshi"		Vani Jairam
