= Kavyamela =

- Directed by: M. Krishnan Nair
- Written by: S. L. Puram Sadanandan
- Produced by: T. E. Vasudevan
- Starring: Prem Nazir; Sheela
- Cinematography: C. J. Mohan
- Edited by: T. R. Sreenivasalu
- Music by: Dakshinamoorthy
- Production company: Jayamaruthy
- Release date: 22 October 1965
- Country: India
- Language: Malayalam
- Budget: ₹ 1.5 lakhs

Kavyamela (transl. Poetry Fair) is a 1965 Indian Malayalam-language film written by S. L. Puram Sadanandan and directed by M. Krishnan Nair, starring Prem Nazir and Sheela in the lead roles. The film is best known for the performance by Prem Nazir and songs by Dakshinamoorthy – Vayalar team.

Kavyamela was released on 22 October 1965. It won the National Film Award for Best Feature Film in Malayalam.

The movie was a remake of the 1961 Kannada movie Kantheredu Nodu produced by A K Velan. Velan, who had earlier sold the copyrights of the Kannada movie Kantheredu Nodu to T. E. Vasudevan for Rs.1000, subsequently purchased it back for Rs.5000 to remake it in Tamil as a Devi (1968), which bombed at the box office.

== Cast ==
- Prem Nazir as Jayadevan
- Sheela as Sreedevi
- Adoor Bhasi as Vikraman
- G. K. Pillai as Dr. Panikkar
- Nellikkodu Bhaskaran as Balachandran, Dr. Panikkar's nephew
- Muthukulam Raghavan Pillai
- Nilambur Ayisha
- S. P. Pillai as Kamath
- Prathapachandran as Prasadakan
- P. Leela as herself
- P. B. Sreenivas as himself
- K. J. Yesudas as himself
- M. B. Sreenivasan as himself
- V. Dakshinamoorthy as himself
- Murali
- Saradadevi
- Ramesh
- Baby Saroja
- P.A Thomas

== Production ==
The film was shot at Newton and Shyamala Studios. The film's story line is similar to Guru Dutt's Pyaasa (1957, Hindi). However, the film is an official remake of a Kannada film by Velan. T. E. Vasudevan bought the rights of the film from Velan with a shoestring amount of ₹ 1000. Owing to the commercial success of Malayalam version, Velan wanted to remake the film into Tamil. He bought back the rights for ₹ 5000, and made the Tamil film Devi (1968), which failed at the box office.

== Soundtrack ==
The music was composed by V. Dakshinamoorthy. Lyrics were written by Vayalar Ramavarma.

Song	Singers
"Devi Sreedevi"	K. J. Yesudas
"Devi Sreedevi" – F	P. Leela
"Eeshwaranethedithedi"	Uthaman
"Janani Jagajanani"	K. J. Yesudas
"Naadam Shoonyathayinkal"	Uthaman
"Nithyavasantham" (Swararaagaroopini)	K. J. Yesudas
"Swapnangal Swapnangal"	Chorus, Gomathy
"Swapnangal Swapnangal"	K. J. Yesudas, V. Dakshinamoorthy, P. Leela, P. B. Sreenivas, M. B. Sreenivasan
"Swapnangal Swapnangale"	K. J. Yesudas, P. Leela
"Swararaagaroopini"	K. J. Yesudas
"Theerthayaathra Ithu"	K. J. Yesudas, P. Leela
