= Line Bus =

- Directed by: K. S. Sethumadhavan
- Written by: Muttathu Varkey; S. L. Puram Sadanandan (dialogues)
- Screenplay by: S. L. Puram Sadanandan
- Produced by: C. C. Baby
- Starring: Madhu; Jayabharathi; Adoor Bhasi; Prameela
- Cinematography: Melli Irani
- Edited by: T. R. Sreenivasalu
- Music by: G. Devarajan
- Production company: MS Productions
- Distributed by: MS Productions
- Release date: 24 December 1971
- Country: India
- Language: Malayalam

Line Bus is a 1971 Indian Malayalam film, directed by K. S. Sethumadhavan and produced by C. C. Baby. The film stars Madhu, Jayabharathi, Adoor Bhasi and Prameela in the lead roles. The film featured a musical score by G. Devarajan.

== Cast ==
- Madhu as Gopi
- Jayabharathi as Sarasamma
- Adoor Bhasi as Govindhan Pilla
- Meena as Pankiyamma
- Bahadoor as Vareed
- Alummoodan as Chacko
- Prameela as Priyamma
- Dinachandran
- Jameela Malik
- Khadeeja as Kathreena
- K.P. Ummer as Chandrasenan

== Soundtrack ==
The music was composed by G. Devarajan and the lyrics were written by Vayalar Ramavarma.

No.	Song	Singers	Lyrics	Length (m:ss)
1	"Adwaitham Janicha"	K. J. Yesudas	Vayalar Ramavarma	
2	"Minnum Ponnim Kireedam"	P. Leela	Vayalar Ramavarma	
3	"Thrikkaakkare Poo"	P. Madhuri	Vayalar Ramavarma	
4	"Villukettiya Kadukkanittoru"	P. Madhuri, Latha Raju	Vayalar Ramavarma	
