= Oppol =

- Theatrical release poster
- Directed by: K. S. Sethumadhavan
- Written by: M. T. Vasudevan Nair
- Produced by: Rosamma George
- Starring: Balan K. Nair; Menaka; Master Aravind; Shankaradi; Kaviyoor Ponnamma
- Cinematography: Madhu Ambat
- Edited by: TR Sreenivasalu
- Music by: M. B. Sreenivasan
- Distributed by: Angel Films/JMJ Arts
- Release date: 2 April 1981
- Country: India
- Language: Malayalam

Oppol (English: Elder Sister) is a 1981 Malayalam-language drama film, produced by Rosamma George under the banner of JMJ Arts, directed by K. S. Sethumadhavan and written by M. T. Vasudevan Nair. The film stars Balan K. Nair, Menaka and Master Aravind in the lead roles. The film features original songs composed by M. B. Sreenivasan. The film was based on a short story of the same name written by M. T. Vasudevan Nair in 1975. The film revolves around Malu and her brother Appu. Malu marries Govindan and shifts to his house along with her brother. Appu however, becomes jealous of Govindan because he suspects that he will isolate him from his sister. The rest of the film deals with how they mend their relationship.

The film was released in theaters on 2 April 1981 to critical acclaim. The film was also a major commercial success and became the second highest grossing Malayalam film of the year behind Kolilakkam. It won three National Awards for Best Actor (Balan K. Nair), Best Child Artist (Master Aravind) and Best Female Playback Singer (S. Janaki). It also won two State Awards for Best Film and Best Director (K. S. Sethumadhavan). The film is now considered a classic in Malayalam cinema and it also marked the official debut of veteran actress, Menaka G. Suresh.

== Plot ==
The film revolves around Malu, her younger brother Appu (Aravind) and Malu's husband Govindan. Malu and 6-year old Appu were living together. When Malu is married to Govindan, an ex-military officer, she takes Appu with her to Govindan's house. Govindan is a bit annoyed, but adjusts to the situation to win over his wife, who is much younger than him. Appu, on the other hand, becomes jealous of Govindan and worries he will isolate him from his dear sister. He attacks Govindan during honeymoon and Malu scolds him. The boy runs away from the house and Malu becomes distressed. Towards the end it is revealed that Appu is actually the son of Malu. When Govindan discovers the truth, he tirelessly searches for the boy and brings him back.

== Short story ==
The Little Magazine, A children's magazine adapted the film into a short story.

== Cast ==
- Balan K. Nair as Govindhan Kutty
- Menaka as Malu / Malooty / Oppol (Voice by Vidhubala)
- Master Aravind/M. P. Ramnath as Appu / T Rajasekharan
- Kaviyoor Ponnamma as Narayani amma / Appu's Vallyamama
- Jose Prakash as Narayani's brother
- Sankaradi as Kunjan Nair

== Soundtrack ==
The music was composed by M. B. Sreenivasan with lyrics by P. Bhaskaran.

| No. | Song | Singers | Lyrics | Length (m:ss) |
|---|---|---|---|---|
| 1 | "Chaattal Mazhayum" | Chorus, Malathi, Latha Devi | P. Bhaskaran | |
| 2 | "Ettumaanoorambalathil Ezhunnallathu" | S. Janaki | P. Bhaskaran | |
| 3 | "Ettumanoorambalathil" (Plain) (Bit) | S. Janaki | P. Bhaskaran | |
| 4 | "Pottikkaan Chennappol" | K. J. Yesudas | P. Bhaskaran | |

== Reception ==
=== Critical reception ===
Upon release the film received excellent reviews. In a retrospect review Neelima Menon of The News Minute goes on to say that the film is K. S. Sethumadhavan's most prolific and underrated work. She also states that the film was bold at the time for discussing a variety of issues that women face in society, like the stigma around a woman who loses her chastity before marriage. She also goes on to appreciate Balan K. Nair's performance in the film and praises its screenplay for its boldness to tackle issues that woman face in society. Appu, in her view, shows subtle signs of an Oedipus complex.

=== Box office ===
For the first week response was lukewarm however, through positive reviews and word of mouth, the film went on to become a commercial success. The film completed a 100 day run in several centers. The film was the second highest-grossing film of the year behind Kolilakkam.

== Accolades ==
National Film Awards

- Second Best Feature Film
- National Film Award for Best Actor for Balan K. Nair
- National Film Award for Best Child Artist for Aravind
- National Film Award for Best Female Playback Singer for S. Janaki (song: "Ettumanoor Ambalathile")

Kerala State Film Awards

- Kerala State Film Award for Best Film
- Kerala State Film Award for Best Director for K. S. Sethumadhavan.
