= Ashokavanam =

1978 film

- Directed by: M. Krishnan Nair
- Written by: V. Devan; Mani Muhammed (dialogues)
- Screenplay by: Mani Muhammed
- Produced by: T. E. Vasudevan
- Starring: Jagathy Sreekumar; Sudheer; MG Soman; Sukumaran
- Cinematography: C. Namasivayam
- Music by: V. Dakshinamoorthy
- Production company: Jaya Maruthi
- Distributed by: Jaya Maruthi
- Release date: 29 September 1978
- Country: India
- Language: Malayalam

Ashokavanam is a 1978 Indian Malayalam film, directed by M. Krishnan Nair and produced by T. E. Vasudevan. The film stars Jagathy Sreekumar, MG Soman, Sudheer and Sukumaran in the lead roles. The film has musical score by V. Dakshinamoorthy.

== Cast ==
- Sudheer
- Sukumaran
- M. G. Soman
- Jagathy Sreekumar
- Adoor Bhasi
- Jose Prakash
- Unnimary
- Balan K. Nair
- Vijayalalitha

== Soundtrack ==
The music was composed by V. Dakshinamoorthy and the lyrics were written by Sreekumaran Thampi and Vellanad Narayanan.

No.	Song	Singers	Lyrics	Length (m:ss)
1	"Maalakkaavadi"	K. J. Yesudas	Sreekumaran Thampi	
2	"Madhyavenal Raathri"	P. Jayachandran	Sreekumaran Thampi	
3	"Premathin Lahariyil"	S. Janaki, Ambili	Vellanad Narayanan	
4	"Sukhamenna Poovuthedi"	P. Jayachandran, Ambili, C. O. Anto	Vellanad Narayanan	
