= Nizhal Nijamagiradhu =

1978 film by K. Balachander

- DVD cover
- Directed by: K. Balachander
- Screenplay by: K. Balachander
- Story by: Pamman
- Produced by: P. R. Govindarajan; J. Duraisamy
- Starring: Kamal Haasan; Sumithra; Shoba
- Cinematography: B. S. Lokanath
- Edited by: N. R. Kittu
- Music by: M. S. Viswanathan
- Production company: Kalakendra Movies
- Release date: 24 March 1978
- Country: India
- Language: Tamil

Nizhal Nijamagiradhu (Tamil pronunciation: [n̪iɻal n̪idʑamaːɡiraðu] transl. Illusion becomes reality) is a 1978 Indian Tamil-language film written directed by K. Balachander. The film stars Kamal Haasan, Sumithra and Shoba, with Sarath Babu, Hanumanthu and T. S. B. K. Moulee in supporting roles. It is a remake of the Malayalam film Adimakal. The film was released on 24 March 1978.

== Plot ==
Venkatachalam and Indumathi are siblings. Indumathi hates men and she is adamant that she will never get married. Sanjeevi is a friend of Venkatachalam and often visits his house. Sanjeevi likes Indumathi's attitude and starts teasing her many times, they often quarrel as well. Though Indumathi too starts liking him, she is too egotistical to show her romantic side to Sanjeevi as she doesn't want to remove her stubborn attitude "mask".

Thilagam is a young girl from the village who comes to work as a servant in Venkatachalam's house. Her innocence draws Venkatachalam towards her and they get intimate. She becomes pregnant, but Venkatachalam refuses to support her or own the child. Thilagam is driven out of Venkatachalam's house and gets support from Sanjeevi and Kasi, a man who is hard of hearing, who also worked at Venkatachalam's house and has affection towards Thilagam. Sanjeevi provides Thilagam with lodging and requests Kasi to stay with her and look after her. Thilagam delivers a child.

Months later, after Sanjeevi and Kasi appeal to his conscience, Venkatachalam repents and is ready to accept Thilagam, but she decides to live her life with Kasi, who took care of her during her pregnancy. Indumathi, meanwhile, throws away her "stubborn" mask and asks Sanjeevi to accept her. Sanjeevi accepts her love.

== Cast ==
- Kamal Haasan as Sanjeevi
- Sumithra as Indumathi
- Shoba as Thilagam
- Sarath Babu as Venkatachalam
- Hanumanthu as Kasi
- T. S. B. K. Moulee as Manmatha Naidu
- K. Natraj as Ayyavu
- Oru Viral Krishna Rao as Kalimuthu
- M. S. Sundari Bai as Ponnamma

== Production ==
Sarath Babu was given a role in the film, after Balachander saw him at a function. His first shot was at Hyderabad. Balachander gave Moulee, who had directed films under Balachander's banner, the role of a "women-obsessed local tattler". Balachander, who used to watch Moulee's plays, liked his style of writing and wanted him to write a comedy track for the film. Mouli said that he was given the liberty by Balachander to insert comedy sequences wherever he wanted and that he wrote 16 scenes for the film. For the role of Kasi, Balachander chose stage actor Hanumanthu after he was impressed with his performance in the play Sampoorna Ramayanam.

Balachander stated that he had an egotistical girl (Sumitra) fall for the macho antics of the hero (Kamal Hassan) "to lend credence and strength to the plot" and felt she was in juxtaposition to the innocent victim character played by Shoba. The final length of the film was 3,981.30 metres (13,062.0 ft).

== Soundtrack ==
The music was composed by M. S. Viswanathan with lyrics by Kannadasan. The song "Ilakkanam Marudho" is set to the Hindustani raga Brindavani Sarang, and "Kamban Emandhan" is set to the Carnatic raga Mohanam.

Track listing
| No. | Title | Singer(s) | Length |
|---|---|---|---|
| 1. | "Kamban Emandhaan" | S. P. Balasubrahmanyam | 4:25 |
| 2. | "Ilakanam Maarudho" | S. P. Balasubrahmanyam, Vani Jairam | 4:27 |
| Total length: | | | 8:52 |

== Reception ==
Free India gave the film a positive review appreciating the screenplay, cast performances, photography and "revolutionary" ending.

== Legacy ==
Actor Maadhu Balaji said, "I must have watched Nizhal Nijamagiradhu 40 to 50 times". In 2008, actor and TV host Bosskey named Nizhal Nijamagiradhu among his three most favourite films. In 2005, Kamal Haasan stated that Nizhal Nijamagirathu was far superior to Maro Charitra, another Balachander film he was also part of.

== Bibliography ==
- Sundararaman (2007) [2005]. Raga Chintamani: A Guide to Carnatic Ragas Through Tamil Film Music (2nd ed.). Pichhamal Chintamani. OCLC 295034757.
