= Vanadevatha =

- Directed by: Yusufali Kechery
- Written by: Ritwik Ghatak; Yusufali Kechery (dialogues)
- Screenplay by: Yusufali Kechery
- Produced by: Yusufali Kechery
- Starring: Prem Nazir; Madhushala; KPAC Lalitha; Adoor Bhasi
- Cinematography: Melli Irani
- Edited by: M. S. Mani
- Music by: G. Devarajan
- Production company: HR Films
- Distributed by: HR Films
- Release date: 20 February 1976
- Country: India
- Language: Malayalam

Vanadevatha is a 1976 Indian Malayalam film, directed and produced by Yusufali Kechery. The film stars Prem Nazir, Madhushala and Adoor Bhasi in the lead roles. This is a remake of the Hindi movie Madhumati. The film had musical score by G. Devarajan.

== Cast ==
- Prem Nazir as Chandran/Suresh
- Madhushala as Devi/Nirmala/Parimala
- Adoor Bhasi as Kunju
- K. P. A. C. Azeez as Kannan
- Pattom Sadan as Velu
- T. S. Muthaiah as Prof Das
- Anandan as Sathram Watcher
- K. P. Ummer as Lohithakshan
- N. Govindankutty as Thankappan

== Soundtrack ==
The music was composed by G. Devarajan and the lyrics were written by Yusufali Kechery.

No.	Song	Singers	Lyrics	Length (m:ss)
1	"Husnu Chaahe To"	P. Madhuri	Yusufali Kechery	
2	"Karuthalum Vendilla"	P. Madhuri, Chorus	Yusufali Kechery	
3	"Manmadhante Kodiyadayaalam"	K. J. Yesudas	Yusufali Kechery	
4	"Nin Mridumozhiyil Narutheno"	K. J. Yesudas	Yusufali Kechery	
5	"Praneshwaraa"	P. Madhuri	Yusufali Kechery	
6	"Praneswara" (No BGM)	P. Madhuri	Yusufali Kechery	
7	"Swargam Thaanirangivannatho"	K. J. Yesudas	Yusufali Kechery	
8	"Thuduthude Thudikkunnu"	P. Madhuri	Yusufali Kechery	
9	"Vidarum Munpe"	K. J. Yesudas	Yusufali Kechery	
