= Padunna Puzha =

- Directed by: M. Krishnan Nair
- Written by: V. Valsala; S. L. Puram Sadanandan (dialogues)
- Screenplay by: S. L. Puram Sadanandan
- Produced by: T. E. Vasudevan
- Starring: Prem Nazir; Sheela; Jayabharathi; Adoor Bhasi
- Cinematography: P. Dathu
- Edited by: T. R. Sreenivasalu
- Music by: V. Dakshinamoorthy
- Production company: Jaya Maruthi
- Release date: 20 June 1968
- Country: India
- Language: Malayalam

Padunna Puzha (transl. The Singing River) is a 1968 Indian Malayalam-language film, directed by M. Krishnan Nair and produced by T. E. Vasudevan. The film stars Prem Nazir, Sheela, Jayabharathi and Adoor Bhasi. It had musical score by V. Dakshinamoorthy. The film was remade in Tamil as Mannippu (1969), also directed by Nair.

== Plot ==
Two women, Rajalakshmi and Indumathi, both fall in love with Jayachandran, a famous artist. Jayachandran loves Rajalakshmi. When a man named Raveendran rapes and kills Rajalakshmi, suspicion falls on Jayachandran.

Jayachandran rejects Indumathi after Rajalakshmi's death, leading to her contemplating suicide.

== Cast ==
- Prem Nazir
- Sheela
- Jayabharathi
- Adoor Bhasi
- Sankaradi
- T. R. Omana
- Aranmula Ponnamma
- G. K. Pillai
- K. P. Ummer
- Panjabi
- Prathapan
- Thodupuzha Radhakrishnan
- Ushanandini

== Soundtrack ==
The music was composed by V. Dakshinamoorthy with lyrics by Sreekumaran Thampi.

Song	Singers
"Bhoogolam Thiriyunnu"	C. O. Anto
"Hridayasarassile"	K. J. Yesudas
"Paadunnu Puzha"	K. J. Yesudas
"Paadunnu Puzha"	P. Leela, A. P. Komala
"Paadunnu Puzha"	P. Leela
"Paadunnu Puzha"	S. Janaki, P. Leela
"Paadunnu Puzha" (Bit)	S. Janaki
"Sindhubhairavi Raagarasam"	P. Leela, A. P. Komala
