= Marupakkam =

1990 film by K. S. Sethumadhavan

- Theatrical release poster
- Directed by: K. S. Sethumadhavan
- Screenplay by: K. S. Sethumadhavan
- Based on: Uchi Veyyil by Indira Parthasarathy
- Starring: Sivakumar; Radha; Jayabharathi
- Cinematography: D. Vasanth Kumar
- Edited by: G. Venkitaraman
- Music by: L. Vaidyanathan
- Production companies: National Film Development Corporation of India; Doordarshan
- Release date: 6 March 1992 (theatrical)
- Running time: 85 minutes
- Country: India
- Language: Tamil
- Budget: ₹12 lakh

Marupakkam (English: The Other Side) is a 1991 Indian Tamil-language drama film written and directed by K. S. Sethumadhavan. An adaptation of the Tamil novella Uchi Veyyil by Indira Parthasarathy, the film stars Sivakumar, Radha, and Jayabharathi. Its music is composed by L. Vaidyanathan.

At the 38th National Film Awards, Marupakkam won three National Film Awards, including the Golden Lotus Award for Best Film, making it the first Tamil film to win in that category. The film was featured at the International Film Festival of India in 2003 as part of a retrospective tribute to Sethumadhavan.

== Plot ==
Ambi, who lives in Delhi with his Christian wife Sweetie, arrives at Kumbakonam to meet his father Vembu Iyer who recently suffered a stroke and was paralysed after getting a message that Ambi has separated from his wife. Ambi, feeling guilty, comes to see his father. A few weeks earlier, Ambi, who married Sweetie, came with her to meet his orthodox Brahmin parents Vembu and Janaki. Vembu insulted Sweetie and, unable to accept it, she decided to return immediately to Delhi and forced Ambi to leave with her. At Delhi, they continued quarrelling over it and finally separated. When Vembu got the news, he was upset and suffered a stroke. In the present, the doctor recognises that there is another side to Vembu's life. His son's separation from his wife reminded him of his separation from his beloved first wife Avayam. Slowly, Ambi understands that his father is longing to see has erstwhile wife, because though paralysed, Vembu keeps tapping his fingers as steps for a dance. Vembu now recollects his past.

Vembu and Avayam loved each other and got married against the wishes of Vembu's mother. While Vembu sang well, Avayam sang and danced well. Both kept enjoying their singing and dancing, which was not liked by Vembu's mother whose husband abandoned her for a dancer many years back. Avayam's continued interest in singing and dancing angered her, and she accused Avayam of behaving like a prostitute. When Avayam protested, Vembu slapped her and threw her out of his house for opposing his mother, whom he respected dearly. Avayam walked out and filed for divorce. In court, Vembu accused her of moral turpitude to justify the divorce petition, which hurt Avayam deeply and they got separated. Though separated, Vembu felt guilt for wrongly accusing Avayam.

Ambi's friend Murthy proposes that Ambi should bring Avayam so that his father can see her once before he dies. However, Janaki rejects the idea. When Vembu's situation deteriorates. the doctor and others feel that his hours are numbered. However, Vembu hangs on to life. Murthy learns that Avayam is now a famous dancer named Chitralekha and goes to meet her. In the meanwhile, knowing Vembu's grave condition, Sweetie returns home in traditional attire and seeks forgiveness from Janaki and Vembu. Janaki is happy that her daughter-in-law is back and Vembu is also happy, but still not satisfied. That is when Murthy brings Avayam. Looking at Avayam, Vembu is excited and feels relieved that she has forgiven him. Avayam holds Vembu's hand tightly, which was tapping all along awaiting her return.

== Cast ==
- Sivakumar as Vembu Iyer
- Radha as Avayam
- Jayabharathi as Janaki
- Sekar as Ambi
- Gopi as Murthy
- Veeraraghavan as the doctor
- Yuvashree as Sweetie

== Production ==
=== Development ===
As a fan of Indira Parthasarathy's stories, Malayalam filmmaker K. S. Sethumadhavan approached him with a desire to adapt his novel Vendhu Tanindha Kaadugal for the screen; Parthasarathy however suggested the novella Uchi Veyil, and Sethumadhavan, who had read the story before, read it again and agreed to make it into a film. The title Uchi Veyil could not be retained due to a different film with the same name already having released in 1990, so Marupakkam was chosen. The film was produced by the National Film Development Corporation of India and Doordarshan, Sethumadhavan, in addition to directing, also wrote the screenplay. Cinematography was handled by D. Vasanth Kumar, and editing by G. Venkitaraman, while the background music was composed by L. Vaidyanathan.

=== Casting and filming ===
When offered the role of Vembu Iyer by Sethumadhavan, Sivakumar, who had read the source material, readily accepted as he thought it would be a challenging role. He consulted dentists in deciding for his make-up. Though the story is primarily set in Kumbakonam, the film was shot in Madras. Made on a shoestring budget of ₹12 lakh (worth ₹2.7 crore in 2021 prices), filming was completed in 14 days.

== Accolades ==
Marupakkam won three awards at the 38th National Film Awards which took place in 1991: Golden Lotus Award for Best Film, Silver Lotus Award for Best Screenplay (Sethumadhavan), and Silver Lotus Award for Special Jury Award / Special Mention (Jayabharathi). It was the first Tamil film to win the Best Film award. Sivakumar was a strong contender for the National Film Award for Best Actor in a Leading Role, but lost to Amitabh Bachchan for Agneepath. Sethumadhavan won the Film Fans Association Award for Best Director, and Sivakumar won for Best Character Actor. The film was featured at the International Film Festival of India in 2003 as part of a retrospective tribute to Sethumadhavan.

== Reception ==
Marupakkam was theatrically released on 6 March 1992. N. Krishnaswamy of The Indian Express wrote the following week, "Sethumadhavan's narration is designed to be impressive. Based on Indira Parthasarathy's novella, the script of Marupakkam tries to be offbeat by withholding information and by cutting back and forth time." The Tamil magazine Ananda Vikatan, in a review dated 15 March 1992, applauded Marupakkam as a sharply focused film on the subject without any diversion with good editing, superb acting, re-recording at the right places and nice presentation. The reviewer said only Sethumadhavan could translate a simple but meaningful story by Indira Parthasarathy into an amazing film like this, and felt more such films like this must come in Tamil cinema. Another Tamil magazine, Kumudam, called it a "masterpiece" from Sivakumar, and said his career could be divided into two eras: "pre-Marupakkan and post-Marupakkam". Movieman of Madras Musings appreciated Sethumadhavan's direction for eschewing "The costumary, loud, artificial theatrics of the usual Kodambakkam Tamil film" while also praising the acting of star cast, Vaidyanathan's background score, Vasanthakumar's cinematography "that make Marupakkam a fine film at every level".

== Bibliography ==
- Baskaran, S. Theodore (2013) [1996]. The Eye Of The Serpent: An Introduction To Tamil Cinema. Westland. ISBN 978-93-83260-74-4.
- Dhananjayan, G. (2014). Pride of Tamil Cinema: 1931–2013. Blue Ocean Publishers. OCLC 898765509.
