= Ollathumathi =

- Directed by: K. S. Sethumadhavan
- Written by: Chandran; Jagathy N. K. Achari (dialogues)
- Screenplay by: Jagathy N. K. Achari
- Produced by: M. P. Chandrasekhara Pillai
- Starring: Prem Nazir; Sathyan; Madhu; Sheela; KP Ummer
- Cinematography: Melli Irani
- Edited by: Thankaraj
- Music by: L. P. R. Varma
- Production company: Mathaji Pictures
- Distributed by: Mathaji Pictures
- Release date: 22 December 1967
- Country: India
- Language: Malayalam

Ollathumathi is a 1967 Indian Malayalam-language film directed by K. S. Sethumadhavan, produced by M. P. Chandrasekhara Pillai, starring Prem Nazir, Sathyan, Madhu and Sheela. The film has a musical score (songs) by L. P. R. Varma.

== Cast ==
- Prem Nazir
- Sathyan
- Madhu
- Sheela
- Adoor Bhasi
- Muthukulam Raghavan Pillai
- Sankaradi
- Shobha
- Shubha
- T. R. Omana
- T. S. Muthaiah
- Adoor Pankajam
- Bahadoor
- G. K. Pillai
- Indirarani
- K. M. Warrier
- K. P. Ummer
- Kaduvakulam Antony
- Kamaladevi
- Kottarakkara Sreedharan Nair
- M. G. Menon
- Meena
- S. P. Pillai
- Susheela

== Soundtrack ==
The music was composed by L. P. R. Varma with lyrics by Vayalar Ramavarma, Kumaranasan, Ramachandran, P. Bhaskaran, and Thikkurissy Sukumaran Nair. Background music was composed by M. B. Sreenivasan

No.	Song	Singers	Lyrics	Length (m:ss)
1	"Ajnaatha Sakhi"	K. J. Yesudas	Vayalar Ramavarma	
2	"Ee Valliyil Ninnu Chemme"	A. P. Komala, Renuka	Kumaranasan	
3	"Maaran Varunnennu"	P. Leela, B. Vasantha	Ramachandran	
4	"Njanoru Kashmeeri Sundari"	A. P. Komala, B. Vasantha, Renuka	P. Bhaskaran	
5	"Santhaapaminnu Naattaarkku"	Kamukara	S. K. Nair	
6	"Shankuppilla Kannirukkumbol"	Sarath Chandran	Thikkurissy Sukumaran Nair	
7	"Unni Virinjittum"	Kamukara	S. K. Nair	
