= Adimakal =

- Poster
- Directed by: K. S. Sethumadhavan
- Screenplay by: Thoppil Bhasi
- Based on: Adimakal by Pamman
- Produced by: M. O. Joseph
- Starring: Sathyan; Prem Nazir; Sheela; Sharada
- Cinematography: Melli Irani
- Edited by: M. S. Mani
- Music by: G. Devarajan
- Production company: Manjilas
- Distributed by: Manjilas
- Release date: 5 April 1969
- Running time: 145 min
- Country: India
- Language: Malayalam

Adimakal (transl. Slaves) is a 1969 Indian Malayalam-language film, directed by K. S. Sethumadhavan and produced by M. O. Joseph. The film stars Sathyan, Prem Nazir, Sheela and Sharada. G. Devarajan composed the music. The film won the National Film Award for Best Feature Film in Malayalam. It is based on a novel of the same name by Pamman. The film was remade in Hindi as Intezar (1973), in Telugu as Chilakamma Cheppindi (1977) and in Tamil as Nizhal Nijamagiradhu (1978).

== Plot ==
Ponnama is a pretty young girl who goes to work as a live-in maid with a family consisting of a brother, Ananthan, and a sister, Saraswathyamma. Saraswathyamma is very religious and spends most of her time in prayers and rituals. Also working in the house is Raghavan, a.k.a. Pottan, so called, because he cannot hear properly. Potten loves Ponnamma, but she treats him like a friend. Ponnamma and Ananthan become close, and Ponnamma becomes pregnant. Ananthan refuses to accept the baby as his and asks her to not reveal that he is the father. Ponnamma doesn't tell anyone who the father of her child is. The only person she trusts is Appukuttan, a bank employee who likes Saraswathyamma. Saraswathyamma likes Appukuttan but religiosity comes in the way of accepting his love and she rebuffs his affections.

Saraswathyamma sends Ponnamma to live with Raghavan as she cannot keep an unmarried pregnant girl in the house due to societal pressures. Ponamma delivers a baby girl. Raghavan treats the baby as his own child, but Ponnamma still has no romantic feelings toward him. Ponnama's mother disowns her when he hears of her pregnancy. Meanwhile, Saraswathyamma realizes the folly of blind devotion when she finds out the swami she was following was a lecherous man.

Appukuttan finally reveals to Saraswathiamma who is the birth father of the baby. Saraswathiamma, Appukuttan, and Ananthan go to Raghu's house to get Ponnamma back home to marry Ananthan. But Ponnamma refuses. She has seen Raghavan's unconditional acceptance, and love and care for the baby. She feels he is her baby's deserved father. Everyone accepts her verdict, and Appukuttan prepares to leave town due to a job transfer. He is surprised to see a changed Saraswathiamma, who requests she goes with him to live as husband and wife.

== Cast ==
- Sathyan as Appukkuttan
- Prem Nazir as Raghavan
- Sheela as Saraswathyamma
- Sharada as Ponnamma
- Adoor Bhasi as Giridhara Yogi/Naanu Kurup
- Ammini
- Sankaradi as Shanku Ammavan
- Jesey as Anandan
- Adoor Bhavani as Karthiyayini
- Baby Kumudam as Vilasini
- Bahadoor as Bhargavan
- Kumari Padmini as Meenakshi
- Kuttan Pillai
- N. Govindankutty as Pachu Kurup
- Paravoor Bharathan as Unnithan

== Soundtrack ==
The music was composed by G. Devarajan and the lyrics were written by Vayalar Ramavarma and Jayadevar. The devotional number 'Chethi mandaram thulasi...' (P. Susheela) was elevated to the status of a prayer song. 'Thaazhampoo manamulla thanuppulla...' (A. M. Rajah) was another hit and one of the singer's best in the language. The other hits include 'Manaseswari maappu tharoo...' (Raja), 'Indumukhi ..... (P. Jayachandran), and the chorus 'Narayanam bhaje...' led by P. Jayachandran. A few verses 'Lalitha lavanga Latha...' from Jayadeva's 'Geeta Govindam' rendered by P. Leela was also a hit.

No.	Song	Singers	Lyrics	Length (m:ss)
1	"Chethi Mandaaram Thulasi"	P. Susheela	Vayalar Ramavarma	03:05
2	"Indumukhi"	P. Jayachandran	Vayalar Ramavarma	02:53
3	"Lalithalavanga"	P. Leela	Jayadevar	03:22
4	"Maanaseshwari"	A. M. Rajah	Vayalar Ramavarma	03:00
5	"Naarayanam Bhaje"	P. Jayachandran, Chorus, Paramasivan Bhagavathar	Bhadrachala Ramadasu	03:02
6	"Thaazhampoo Manamulla"	A. M. Rajah	Vayalar Ramavarma	03:29

== Reception ==
The Indian Express wrote, "With a little more care in scripting and editing, Manjila's Adimakal (Slaves) would have aptly ended there, but sometimes, even our best film-makers do not know when and where to stop. There are a few other irrelevant scenes which, if chopped off would help this Malayalam film gain in tempo and appeal."

== Awards ==
- Filmfare Award for Best Film - Malayalam won by M. O. Joseph (1969)
