= Oh Maane Maane =

- Theatrical release poster
- Directed by: A. Jagannathan
- Screenplay by: A. L. Narayanan
- Story by: Pamman
- Starring: Mohan; Urvashi
- Cinematography: P. Ganesa Pandian
- Edited by: R. Devarajan
- Music by: Ilaiyaraaja
- Production company: Filmco
- Release date: 22 October 1984
- Country: India
- Language: Tamil

Oh Maane Maane (transl. Oh dear, Oh dear) is a 1984 Indian Tamil-language romance film directed by A. Jagannathan. The film stars Mohan and Urvashi. It is a remake of the 1974 Malayalam film Chattakari, which itself was based on a Malayalam novel of the same name by Pamman. The film was released on 22 October 1984.

== Cast ==
- Mohan as Mahesh
- Urvashi as Stella
- Thengai Srinivasan as George
- Sivachandran as Joseph
- Calcutta Viswanathan
- Vennira Aadai Moorthy as Sivaraman
- Vadivukkarasi as Victoria
- Manorama
- Vasantha as Meenakshi
- Sangeeta
- Arundhathi as Kasthuri

== Production ==
The song "Roja Ondru" was shot at Karpagam Studios.

== Soundtrack ==
The music composed by Ilaiyaraaja. When Kamal Haasan visited Ilaiyaraaja to discuss another film, he saw that the song "Pon Maanai" was being rehearsed. Since Ilaiyaraaja had not yet finalised a singer for the song, he asked Haasan if he would sing, and Haasan agreed.

Track listing
| No. | Title | Lyrics | Singer(s) | Length |
|---|---|---|---|---|
| 1. | "Roja Ondru" | Vairamuthu | S. P. Balasubrahmanyam, S. Janaki | 4:27 |
| 2. | "Oh Devan" | Na. Kamarasan | S. P. Balasubramanyam, S. Janaki | 4:38 |
| 3. | "Abiramiye Annaiye" | Vaali | P. Susheela, Bangalore Latha | 4:48 |
| 4. | "Happy New Year" | Gangai Amaran | Malaysia Vasudevan, S. Janaki, Deepan Chakravarthy and Sundarrajan | 4:30 |
| 5. | "Pon Maanai" | Mu. Metha | Kamal Haasan | 4:36 |
| Total length: | | | | 22:59 |

== Release and reception ==
The film was released on 22 October 1984 on Diwali. Kalki felt the film was not as great as the original film Chattakari and panned Jagannathan's direction but praised Ilaiyaraaja's music and concluded that theatre owners should be warned that if seats are torn, fans are not responsible for it.
