= Maru Piravi =

- Poster
- Directed by: T. R. Ramanna
- Screenplay by: T. N. Balu
- Story by: A. T. Kovoor
- Based on: Punarjanmam (Malayalam)
- Produced by: S. P. Lakshmanan; S. S. Pazhaniappan; M. N. Arunachalam; M. Suriyanarayanan
- Starring: R. Muthuraman; Manjula; S. A. Ashokan
- Cinematography: Amirtham
- Edited by: D. K. Shankar; V. N. Ragupathy
- Music by: T. R. Pappa
- Production companies: Vijaya & Suri Combines
- Release date: 9 February 1973
- Running time: 127 minutes
- Country: India
- Language: Tamil

Maru Piravi (transl. Reincarnation) is a 1973 Indian Tamil-language erotic thriller film directed by T. R. Ramanna. It stars R. Muthuraman and Manjula. It is the Tamil remake of the 1971 Malayalam film Punarjanmam. The film was released on 9 February 1973.

== Plot ==
The movie plot is based on Oedipus complex.

== Cast ==
- R. Muthuraman as Elango
- Manjula as Saratha
- S. A. Ashokan
- Vijayasree
- Sukumari
- Nagesh
- Thengai Srinivasan
- M. R. R. Vasu
- Manorama
- Lalitha
- Kallapetti Singaram

== Soundtrack ==
Music was by T. R. Pappa and lyrics were written by Kannadasan.

Song	Singers	Length
"Aedi Poongodi Aenintha Paarvai"	M. R. Vijaya	04:16
"Alaigalile Thendral Vandhu"	P. Susheela	03:09
"Kannodu parkkum mogam"	P. Susheela	04:10
"Sondham Ini Un Madiyil"	S. P. Balasubrahmanyam	03:01
"Kaveri Maandhoppu Kaniyo"	Soolamangalam Rajalakshmi	03:09
