= T. E. Vasudevan =

Indian film producer

- Born: 16 July 1917; Tripunithura, Kingdom of Cochin (now Kerala, India)
- Died: 30 December 2014 (aged 97); Panampilly Nagar, Ernakulam
- Occupations: Film producer, film distributor
- Parent(s): A. Sankara Menon; T. Esoda Amma
- Awards: J. C. Daniel Award (Highest Film Award); Rotary International Lifetime achievement award Chalachitra Ratna Award; World Malayalee Council Lifetime Achievement Award

T. E. Vasudevan (16 July 1917 – 30 December 2014) was an Indian film producer, who worked mainly in Malayalam cinema. In 1992, he became the first ever winner of the J. C. Daniel Award, Kerala government's highest honour for contributions to Malayalam cinema.

== Biography ==
Vasudevan was born to A. Sankara Menon and T. Yeshoda Amma on 16 July 1917. At 21, Vasudevan entered the Kerala film industry as an exhibitor in Tripunithura in Ernakulam District.

As a pioneering film distributor in Kerala, Vasudevan started a film distribution office, Associated Pictures (P) Ltd. at Tripunithura in 1940. In less than 10 years he had brought to Kerala more than a 1,000 feature films in different languages such as Malayalam, Tamil, Telugu, Hindi, Canarese and Sinhalese and became one of the prominent film distributor of the State.

Vasudevan was the founder member of Kerala Film Chamber of Commerce in 1955 and served as president between 1995 and 96. He was founder president of Malayala Chalachitra Parishad Madras in 1968 and served it in the same capacity for 10 consecutive years. He was founder member of Kerala Film Producers Association at Ernakulam in 1989 and served as its president for four years.

He was a member in the executive committee of South Indian Film Chamber of Commerce at Madras between 1955 and 1980. He was also a member in Raw Film Steering Committee Madras for five years. He worked for five years to compile a history of the Malayalam Film Industry from the period 1928 to 2000, under the auspices of Kerala Film Chamber of Commerce. Kerala State Chalachitra Academy took the responsibility of printing and publishing his work in book form with him and the chairman of the Academy as joint editors. Though the Academy has released a CD Rom including details from his work, the book is yet to be published.

He died on 30 December 2014 at his residence in Panampilly Nagar, Kochi, following age-related illness.

== Malayalam filmography ==
List of Malayalam films produced by T. E. Vasudevan.

Movie	Year	Director
Amma	1952	K. Vembu
Ashadeepam	1953	G. R. Rao
Snehaseema	1954	S. S. Rajan
Nair Pidicha Pulival	1958	P. Bhaskaran
Njanasundari	1961	K. S. Sethumadhavan
Viyarppinte Vila	1962	M. Krishnan Nair
Puthiya Akasam Puthiya Bhoomi	1962	M. S. Mani
Sathyabhama	1963	M. S. Mani
Bharthavu	1964	M. Krishnan Nair
Kuttikkuppayam	1964	M. Krishnan Nair
Kalyana Photo	1964	J. D. Thottan
Kavyamela	1965	M. Krishnan Nair
Archana	1966	K. S. Sethumadhavan
Pinchuhridhayam	1966	M. Krishnan Nair
Sthanarthi Saramma	1966	K. S. Sethumadhavan
Kottayam Kolacase	1967	K. S. Sethumadhavan
Cochin Express	1967	M. Krishnan Nair
Bharyamar Sookshikkuka	1968	K. S. Sethumadhavan
Padunna Puzha	1968	M. Krishnan Nair
Danger Biscuit	1969	A. B. Raj
Ezhuthatha Kadha	1970	A. B. Raj
Lottery Ticket	1970	A. B. Raj
Marunnattil Oru Malayali	1971	A. B. Raj
Maaya	1972	Ramu Kariat
Sasthram Jayichu Manushyan Thottu	1973	A. B. Raj
Football Champion	1973	A. B. Raj
Madhurappathinezhu	1975	Hariharan
Sexilla Stundilla	1976	B. N. Prakash
Priyamvada	1976	K. S. Sethumadhavan
Thirumulkazhcha	1976	P. Viswanath
Kaduvaye Pidicha Kiduva	1977	A. B. Raj
Yatheem	1977	M. Krishnan Nair
Ashokavanam	1978	M. Krishnan Nair
Kudumbam Namukku Sreekovil	1978	Hariharan
Jimmy	1979	Melattoor Rama Varma
Ellaam Ninakku Vendi	1981	J. Sasikumar
Maniyara	1984	M. Krishnan Nair
Manithali	1984	M. Krishnan Nair
Kaalam Maari Kadha Maari	1987	M. Krishnan Nair

== Awards ==
- J. C. Daniel Award (Highest Film Award) instituted by Kerala Government (1992)
- The South Indian Film Industry honoured him during the Platinum Jubilee of Indian Film Industry (1989).
- Lifetime achievement award by Rotary International (District 3200) (2002)
- Chalachitra Ratna Award by Kerala Film Critics Association, Thiruvananthapuram (2009)
- Lifetime Achievement Award by the World Malayalee Council (2010).
- Honored by the All Kerala Photographers' Association (2012).

The following of his Malayalam films have won National Film Awards though T. E. Vasudevan never went to New Delhi to accept the award. Also in 1970, Vasudevan announced that he would cease submitting films for National Awards to make way for newcomers.

- Snehaseema (1954)
- Nair Pidicha Pulival (1956)
- Puthiya Aakasam Puthiya Bhoomi (1964)
- Kavyamela (1965)
- Ezhuthathakatha (1970)
