= Lottery Ticket (1970 film) =

1970 Indian Malayalam film

- Directed by: A. B. Raj
- Written by: S. L. Puram Sadanandan (dialogues)
- Story by: V. Devan
- Produced by: T. E. Vasudevan
- Starring: Prem Nazir; Sheela; Adoor Bhasi; Jose Prakash
- Music by: V. Dakshinamoorthy
- Production company: Jaya Maruthi
- Release date: 28 November 1970
- Country: India
- Language: Malayalam

Lottery Ticket is a 1970 Indian Malayalam-language film, directed by A. B. Raj and produced by T. E. Vasudevan who also wrote the story under the alias V. Devan. The film stars Prem Nazir, Sheela, Adoor Bhasi and Jose Prakash. It was released on 28 November 1970.

== Cast ==
- Prem Nazir as Venugopal
- Sheela as Malathi
- Adoor Bhasi as Lottery Menon
- Jose Prakash as Inspector
- Muthukulam Raghavan Pillai
- Sankaradi as Appukuttan
- Sreelatha Namboothiri as Janamma (Lottery Menon's Wife)
- Paul Vengola as Rajappan
- G. K. Pillai as Inspector
- K. P. Ummer as S.R Menon
- Meena as Rajamma's Mother
- Paravoor Bharathan as Rajamma's Father
- N.Govindankutty as Madhavankutty
- Sadhana as Rajamma
- Thodupuzha Radhakrishnan as Rival Lottery Agent

== Soundtrack ==
The music was composed by V. Dakshinamoorthy and the lyrics were written by Sreekumaran Thampi.

Song	Singers	Length
"Kavya Narthaki"	K. J. Yesudas, P. Leela, Chorus	4:07
"Kumbhamaasa Nilavupole"	K. J. Yesudas	4:05
"Manohari Nin Manoradhathil"	K. J. Yesudas	4:16
"Oro Kanavilum"	P. Leela	2:55
"Oru Roopanottukoduthal"	Adoor Bhasi	3:18
"Poomizhiyaal Pushpaabhishekam"	K. J. Yesudas	3:48
