= Devi (1972 film) =

- Directed by: K. S. Sethumadhavan
- Written by: K. Surendran
- Screenplay by: K. S. Sethumadhavan
- Produced by: M. O. Joseph
- Starring: Prem Nazir; Madhu; Sheela; Adoor Bhasi
- Cinematography: Melli Irani
- Edited by: M. S. Mani
- Music by: G. Devarajan
- Production company: Manjilas
- Distributed by: Manjilas
- Release date: 5 February 1972
- Country: India
- Language: Malayalam

Devi is a 1972 Indian Malayalam film, directed by K. S. Sethumadhavan and produced by M. O. Joseph. The film stars Prem Nazir, Madhu, Sheela and Adoor Bhasi in the lead roles. The film had musical score by G. Devarajan.

== Cast ==
- Prem Nazir
- Madhu
- Sheela
- Adoor Bhasi
- Sankaradi
- Khadeeja
- Meena
- Paravoor Bharathan
- Philomina
- Rani Chandra
- Sujatha

== Soundtrack ==
The music was composed by G. Devarajan and the lyrics were written by Vayalar Ramavarma.

No.	Song	Singers	Lyrics	Length (m:ss)
1	"Chandrakiranam Chaalicheduthoru"	P. Susheela	Vayalar Ramavarma	
2	"Karutha Sooryanudichu"	K. J. Yesudas	Vayalar Ramavarma	
3	"Punarjanmam Ithu"	P. Jayachandran, P. Madhuri, Chorus	Vayalar Ramavarma	
4	"Saamyamakannorudyaaname"	K. J. Yesudas	Vayalar Ramavarma	
