= Bharyamar Sookshikkuka =

- Directed by: K. S. Sethumadhavan
- Screenplay by: S. L. Puram Sadanandan
- Produced by: T. E. Vasudevan
- Starring: Prem Nazir; Sheela; K. P. Ummer
- Music by: V. Dakshinamoorthy
- Production company: Jai Maruthi Productions
- Release date: 1968
- Country: India
- Language: Malayalam

Bharyamar Sookshikkuka (transl. Wives beware) is a 1968 Indian Malayalam-language film, directed by K. S. Sethumadhavan. The film revolves around Shobha (Sheela), who leads a happy life with her husband, who is a doctor and her life takes a turn for the worse when she falls in love with a singer. This is one of the few films in which Prem Nazir played villain.

== Plot ==
Shobha and Dr. Pothuval are a happily married couple living in a palatial house with Dr. Pothuval's jovial father, S. R. Pothuval. S. R. Pothuval fetes a famous singer, Suresh, and Suresh invites S. R Pothuval, his son and daughter in law for the recording of his song. Shobha is a big music fan and is enchanted by Suresh's talent. Meanwhile, Suresh's wife, Vasanthi, who lives in his village, sees his photograph in the papers where he is hosted by the Who's Who of Chennai and starts doubting him. He tries to change her mind to no avail. He requests her to join him in Chennai, which she refuses.

Dr Pothuval leaves for the US for six months. In the meantime, Suresh falls sick, and Senior Pothuval and Shobha look after him. One day, Vasanthi comes to Chennai and sees Suresh and Shobha together. She walks away in anger and returns to her home. Soon, Shobha and Suresh fall in love and decide to divorce their spouses. Shobha's maid, Madhavi Amma, overhears this conversation and is shocked. She tries to dissuade Shobha, but Shobha doesn't listen.

Suesh goes home and, in yet another argument with his wife tells her he wants a divorce. Shocked, she hangs herself to death. Madhavi Amma tells Shobha that Suresh might have killed his wife as he had promised Shobha that he would get rid of her. When Suresh returns to Chennai, Shobha tells him that she cannot marry him as he may kill her, too, if he finds another girlfriend. Suresh gets angry and blames her for his wife's death. He tells her that his wife died because of Shobha, as he asked Vasanthi for a divorce due to Shobha's promise of marriage. He tells her that he will kill her to avenge his wife and makes a move toward her, but by then, Dr Pothuval reaches home. Shobha and Suresh pretend nothing happened, and Dr Pothuval tells them he heard the whole conversation between them. Suresh leaves, and Dr Pothuval throws Shobha out of the house.

Shobha reaches Suresh's house and begs for refuge. Suresh takes her in his car to a lonely place and abandons her. While walking back home, she is offered a lift by two Malayalee men who take her home and rape her. Devastated and angry, Shobha reaches Suresh's hotel and kills him. She then surrenders to the police.

== Cast ==
- Prem Nazir as Suresh
- Sheela as Shobha
- Adoor Bhasi as S. R. Pothuval
- Ammini as Madhavi Amma
- Kamalam as Mala Sinha
- Sankaradi as Devadas
- T. R. Omana as Devaki Amma
- K. P. Ummer as Dr. Pothuval
- Kamaladevi as Vasanthi
- Paravoor Bharathan as Dileep

== Soundtrack ==
The music and background score was composed by V. Dakshinamoorthy and lyrics for all the songs were penned by Sreekumaran Thampi.

Track	Singer(s)
"Aakaasham Bhoomiye"	K. J. Yesudas
"Vaikkathashtami Naalil"	K. J. Yesudas, S. Janaki
"Chandrikayilaliyunnu (M)"	A. M. Rajah
"Chandrikayilaliyunnu (D)"	K. J. Yesudas, P. Leela
"Marubhoomiyil Malar Viriyukayo"	P. Jayachandran
"Maapputharoo"	P. Leela
