= Punarjanmam =

- Poster
- Directed by: K. S. Sethumadhavan
- Screenplay by: Thoppil Bhasi
- Story by: A. T. Kovoor
- Produced by: M. O. Joseph
- Starring: Prem Nazir; Jayabharathi
- Cinematography: Melli Irani
- Edited by: M. S. Mani
- Music by: Devarajan
- Production company: Manjilas
- Release date: 18 August 1972
- Country: India
- Language: Malayalam

Punarjanmam (English: Reincarnation) is a 1972 Indian Malayalam-language erotic thriller film starring Prem Nazir and Jayabharathi. The film is directed by K. S. Sethumadhavan and is based on a case study published by famous atheist and psychiatrist A. T. Kovoor in Mathrubhumi weekly. The film, as well as Prem Nazir's performance, won immense critical acclaim. The film was remade in Tamil as Maru Piravi with Muthuraman and Manjula in the lead roles and in Telugu as Vintha Katha, starring Krishna and Vanisri. The film is considered to be the first erotic psychic thriller in Indian film history.

== Plot ==
Aravindan, a college lecturer, falls in love with his student Radha and marries her. However, the couple's sexual life is a failure, causing intense agony to Radha's father, Panikkar, who is keen to have grandchildren. When all else fail, Panikkar approaches a psychiatrist, who discovers that Aravindan's inability to have sex with Radha may have something to do with his intense affection for his mother, who had died just six months before Aravindan met Radha. How the doctor cajoles Radha into solving her husband's condition forms the climax.

== Cast ==
- Prem Nazir as Aravindan
  - Master Raghu as young Aravindan
- Jayabharathi in double role as Radha / Aravindan's mother
- Bahadoor as Kurup
- Adoor Bhasi as Narayana Panikkar
- Sankaradi as Ashan
- Muthukulam Raghavan Pillai as Jyotsyan
- Paravoor Bharathan as college principal
- Sujatha as Jaanu
- Prema Menon as Sankari
- Khadeeja as Ashan's wife

== Soundtrack ==
All lyrics are written by Vayalar Ramavarma; all music is composed by G. Devarajan.

No.	Title	Artist(s)	Length
1.	"Kaakkem Kaakkede Kunjum"	C. O. Anto
2.	"Kaamashasthramezhuthiya"	P. Jayachandran
3.	"Kaamini Kaavyamohini"	K. J. Yesudas
4.	"Madana Panchami"	P. Madhuri
5.	"Premabhikshuki Bhikshuki"	K. J. Yesudas
6.	"Sooryakaantha Kalppadavil"	P. Susheela
7.	"Unnikkai Valaru"	P. Leela
8.	"Velichamasthamichu"	P. Madhuri

== Awards ==
- The film won Filmfare Award for Best Director - Malayalam received by K. S. Sethumadhavan (1972)
