= Chattakkari (1974 film) =

1974 film by K. S. Sethumadhavan

- VCD cover
- Directed by: K. S. Sethumadhavan
- Screenplay by: Thoppil Bhasi
- Story by: Pamman
- Produced by: M. O. Joseph
- Starring: Lakshmi; Mohan Sharma; Adoor Bhasi; Meena; Sukumari
- Cinematography: Balu Mahendra
- Edited by: MS Mani
- Music by: G. Devarajan
- Production company: Manjilas
- Distributed by: Central Pictures
- Release date: 10 May 1974
- Country: India
- Language: Malayalam

Chattakkari (transl. Anglo Indian Girl) is a 1974 Indian Malayalam-language film directed by K. S. Sethumadhavan and produced by M. O. Joseph, starring Lakshmi (in her major Malayalam debut), Mohan Sharma, Adoor Bhasi and Sukumari. The film was written by Thoppil Bhasi based on Pamman's famous novel of the same name. Chattakkari is the love story of an Anglo-Indian girl (Lakshmi) and a Hindu boy (Mohan Sharma) who consummate the relationship. She has a child out-of-wedlock in secret.

It was the first Malayalam film of Lakshmi and also the start of her romance with co-star Mohan Sharma. It won the Kerala State Film Award for Best Actress and Filmfare Award for Best Actress – Malayalam for Lakshmi. The film won Kerala State Film Award for Best Actor for Adoor Bhasi who played Laxmi's alcoholic father, and the Filmfare Award for Best Feature Film in Malayalam. Storywriter Pamman received the Kerala State Film Award for Best Story. It has the distinction of being the first Malayalam film to run continuously for 40 weeks in a Bangalore theatre. All Songs composed by well known music director G. Devarajan were instant hits.

In 2012, it was remade in the same name, directed by Santosh Sethumadhavan and produced by Suresh Kumar under the banner of Revathy Kalamandir and starring Shamna Kasim in the title roles.

== Plot ==
Julie is the eldest daughter of Morris, an Anglo-Indian engine-driver. Usha her close friend is from an orthodox Hindu Warrier family. At Usha's residence she (Julie) meets her brother Sasi who is studying at a different place. Julie soon falls in love with Sasi, and even Usha is aware of it. The relationship gets more cozy and Julie gets pregnant. Her alcoholic father Morris soon dies. Julie is taken to a remote place where her mother's aunt lives. There she gives birth to a boy.

Julie's mother who feels that England is their true motherland decided to migrate to the United Kingdom. Soon Julie confesses about every thing to Usha. She also meets Sasi who is now ready to accept her. But Sasi's orthodox mother rejects her outright. Sasi's father Mr. Warrier questions him, and Sasi confesses about his role in ruining Julie's life.

Mr. Warrier then helps Julie's family in packing up and invites them to his home for a small farewell. Here he introduces his wife and also his daughter Usha. Usha comes out with a small baby in her arms, and Julie recognizes it as her kid. Mr. Warrier then says that he and his family have no hesitations in accepting Julie as their daughter-in-law and encourages the rest of the Morris family to stay back in India.

== Cast ==
- Lakshmi as Julie
- Mohan as Sasi
- Sujatha as Usha
- Adoor Bhasi as Morris
- Meena as Mrs. Warrier, Sasi's Mother
- Sukumari as Margarette
- Reena as Ilin
- M. G. Soman as Richard
- Sankaradi as Mr. Warrier
- Bahadoor
- Paravoor Bharathan
- Prem Prakash
- Master Sathyajith
- Vinodini

== Soundtrack ==
The music was composed by G. Devarajan and the lyrics were written by Vayalar Ramavarma and Usha Uthup.

No.	Song	Singers	Lyrics	Length (m:ss)
1	"Julie I Love You"	K. J. Yesudas, P. Madhuri	Vayalar Ramavarma	
2	"Love is Just Around"	Usha Uthup	Usha Uthup	
3	"Mandasameeranil"	K. J. Yesudas	Vayalar Ramavarma	
4	"Naarayanaaya Nama"	P. Leela	Vayalar Ramavarma	
5	"Yuvaakkale Yuvathikale"	P. Madhuri	Vayalar Ramavarma	

== Production ==
=== Writing and casting ===
Pamman's story was published in Jay Keralam a weekly published in Chennai. Producer M. O. Joseph bought the rights. He signed director K. S. Sethumadhavan, cinematographer Balu Mahendra and scriptwriter Thoppil Bhasi for the film. The director suggested Lakshmi as heroine and Mohan who had acted in P. N. Menon's art film as hero. Sukumari was Lakshmi's mother in the film. Lakshmi played an Anglo Indian girl who wore short skirts throughout the film, which made her a sex symbol as well. The sensuous songs and the youthful pair set the box office on fire.

The film's ending is different from that of the book. In the book the Hindu boy deserts his Anglo Indian girlfriend who is pregnant and never comes back but in the films, he comes back to accept her. Rahim, an admirer of Julie whom she had rejected, tries to influence her father by giving him booze and due to this the old man vomits blood and dies. In the film, Rahim has no role in the death of the old man.

=== Filming ===
The film was shot at Shornur Junction, a famous railway Junction in the Southern Railway especially during the steam era. Shornur had one of the largest steam locomotive workshops.

== Remakes ==
The Hindi remake became very famous in 1975. Lakshmi repeated her role by playing the title role in Julie (1975). She received the Filmfare Best Actress Award. The music composed by Rajesh Roshan won him the Filmfare Best Music Director Award, and his songs "Dil Kya Kare" and "My heart is beating" are still evergreen hits. Nadira won the Filmfare Best Supporting Actress Award for playing Julie's mother. Future superstar Sridevi played Julie's younger sister.

Tamil remake titled Oh Maane Maane (1984) had Urvasi playing the lead role and Mohan as her lover.

Lakshmi also starred in the Telugu remake titled Miss Julie Prema Katha (1975). Chattakkari also had a Telugu dubbing titled English Ammayi.

The Kannada remake titled Julie (2006) had Ramya in the title role of Julie and Dino Morea as her lover.

The movie was remade in Malayalam with the same name in 2012. The remake was directed by Santhosh Sethumadhavan, son of K. S. Sethumadhavan who directed the original version. The remake was produced by Suresh Kumar under Revathy Kalamadhir banner. It was shot in a timespan of 25 days, setting a new record in Malayalam cinema. It was released in September 2012.
