= P. Ayyaneth =

Indian writer

Pathrose Ayyaneth (1928 - 2008), popularly known as P. Ayyaneth, was a Malayalam-language novelist, short story writer and poet from Kerala, India. Born in 1928 at Chandanappally, Pathanamthitta, Ayyaneth graduated in mathematics and worked as a teacher, journalist and government employee. After retiring as assistant director of the Bureau of Economics and Statistics, he practised as a lawyer. His entered the literary field with a poem titled Parimalam, written at the age of 15. He soon began writing prose. Many of his novels appeared as serials in periodicals in the 1960s and 1970s. A prolific writer, he penned 40 novels, 10 short story collections, a few plays and articles. His widely read novels included Manushya Nee Mannakunnu, Thiruseshippu and Vazhvemayam. Six of his novels have become films. Ayyaneth died in a hospital on 17 June 2008 of injuries suffered in a road accident. He was hit by the driver of a scooter while he was crossing the road near his house in Kumarapuram.
