= Naadan Pennu =

- Directed by: K. S. Sethumadhavan
- Written by: Chempil John; S. L. Puram Sadanandan (dialogues)
- Screenplay by: S. L. Puram Sadanandan
- Produced by: M. O. Joseph
- Starring: Prem Nazir; Sathyan; Sheela; Jayabharathi
- Cinematography: Melli Irani
- Edited by: M. S. Mani
- Music by: G. Devarajan
- Production company: Navajeevan Films
- Distributed by: Navajeevan Films
- Release date: 24 November 1967
- Country: India
- Language: Malayalam

Naadan Pennu is a 1967 Indian Malayalam-language film, directed by K. S. Sethumadhavan and produced by M. O. Joseph. The film stars Prem Nazir, Sathyan, Sheela and Jayabharathi. This movie was remade in Telugu as Premajeevulu. Krishna, Kanta Rao and Rajasri acted in the Telugu movie. The film has musical score by G. Devarajan.

== Cast ==
- Prem Nazir as Babu
- Sathyan as Chacko
- Sheela as Achamma
- Jayabharathi as Sainaba
- Adoor Bhasi as Ummukka
- Thikkurissy Sukumaran Nair as Babu's father
- T. S. Muthaiah as Mathai
- Bahadoor as Antappan
- Meena as Saramma
- N. Govindankutty as Priest
- S. P. Pillai as Aliyaar
- Paul Vengola as Appu
- P. R. Menon

== Soundtrack ==
The music was composed by G. Devarajan and the lyrics were written by Vayalar Ramavarma.

No.	Song	Singers	Lyrics	Length (m:ss)
1	"Aakashangalirikkum"	P. Susheela, Chorus	Vayalar Ramavarma	
2	"Bhoomiyil Mohangal"	K. J. Yesudas	Vayalar Ramavarma	
3	"Eeyide Penninoru"	S. Janaki	Vayalar Ramavarma	
4	"Himavaahini"	P. Susheela	Vayalar Ramavarma	
5	"Himavaahini" (Bit)	K. J. Yesudas	Vayalar Ramavarma	
6	"Himavaahini" (M)	K. J. Yesudas	Vayalar Ramavarma	
7	"Iniyathe Panchami"	P. Susheela	Vayalar Ramavarma	
8	"Naadan Premam"	P. Jayachandran, J. M. Raju	Vayalar Ramavarma	
