= Priyamvada =

- Directed by: K. S. Sethumadhavan
- Written by: S. L. Puram Sadanandan
- Screenplay by: K. S. Sethumadhavan
- Based on: Suryagandhi (1973)
- Produced by: T. E. Vasudevan
- Starring: Kaviyoor Ponnamma; KPAC Lalitha; Adoor Bhasi; Lakshmi
- Cinematography: N. Karthikeyan
- Edited by: B. S. Mani
- Music by: V. Dakshinamoorthy
- Production company: Jaya Maruthi
- Distributed by: Jaya Maruthi
- Release date: 16 January 1976
- Country: India
- Language: Malayalam

Priyamvada (sometimes written Preeyamvadha or Priyamvadha) is a 1976 Indian Malayalam film, directed by K. S. Sethumadhavan and produced by T. E. Vasudevan. The film stars Kaviyoor Ponnamma, KPAC Lalitha, Adoor Bhasi and Lakshmi in the lead roles. The film has musical score by V. Dakshinamoorthy. The film was a remake of the Tamil film Suryagandhi (1973).

== Plot ==
Mohan is the eldest son in a middle-class family, having a superiority complex that he should be the first in everything. He and Radha fall in love and they get married. Mohan works in a low wage job despite being a graduate, which is insufficient for the family. So, Radha decides to join as a sales officer and starts working in a company. Her hard work earns her a good name and a promotion. So, her respect in the family rises as it improves the economic status of the family and she is able to fulfill the needs and wants of the family. Mohan is intolerant of Radha's respect growing, and he starts hating her.

Mohan's ego wants him to earn more than Radha and in the process he quits his job with the hope of finding a better one. Meantime, he also does modelling for liquor ads much against his family's wishes. Radha, with the help of her boss, recommends a high paying job for Mohan. But she does not inform this to Mohan as he might not take up the job if he knows that Radha was responsible for it. Mohan quits modelling after he gets the new job and mocks Radha, as he is paid more than her now. Mohan wants Radha to quit her job, but Radha does not agree to that.

Mohan's sister Suseela falls in love with a guy and becomes pregnant. Radha finds this out and arranges for the wedding to be as soon as possible, so that her pre-marital pregnancy is not known to others. Mohan misunderstands that Radha is overpowering him in family decisions and sends Radha out from his home and plans for a divorce. On the day of Suseela's marriage, the groom's father informs the truth to Mohan, which makes him realise his mistakes. Mohan understands that Radha preferred going to the job so that she can pay the dowry demanded by Suseela's in-laws. Mohan also finds out that his job was recommended with the help of Radha. Mohan transforms into a good man and decides to lead a happy life with Radha.

== Cast ==
- Kaviyoor Ponnamma
- KPAC Lalitha
- Adoor Bhasi
- Lakshmi
- Mohan Sharma
- Pattom Sadan
- Prema
- Sankaradi
- Kuthiravattam Pappu
- Paravoor Bharathan
- Vincent

== Soundtrack ==
The music was composed by V. Dakshinamoorthy and the lyrics were written by Sreekumaran Thampi.

| No. | Song | Singers | Lyrics | Length (m:ss) |
|---|---|---|---|---|
| 1 | "Ariyaamo Ningalkkariyaamo" | Sreelatha Namboothiri | Sreekumaran Thampi | |
| 2 | "Maanikya Sreekovil" (Pathos) | K. J. Yesudas, S. Janaki | Sreekumaran Thampi | |
| 3 | "Manikya Sreekovil" (Happy) | K. J. Yesudas, S. Janaki | Sreekumaran Thampi | |
| 4 | "Muraleegaanathin" | K. J. Yesudas | Sreekumaran Thampi | |
| 5 | "Thiruvaathira Manassil" | P. Susheela, B. Vasantha | Sreekumaran Thampi | |
