= K. T. Muhammed =

Malayalam playwright and screenwriter

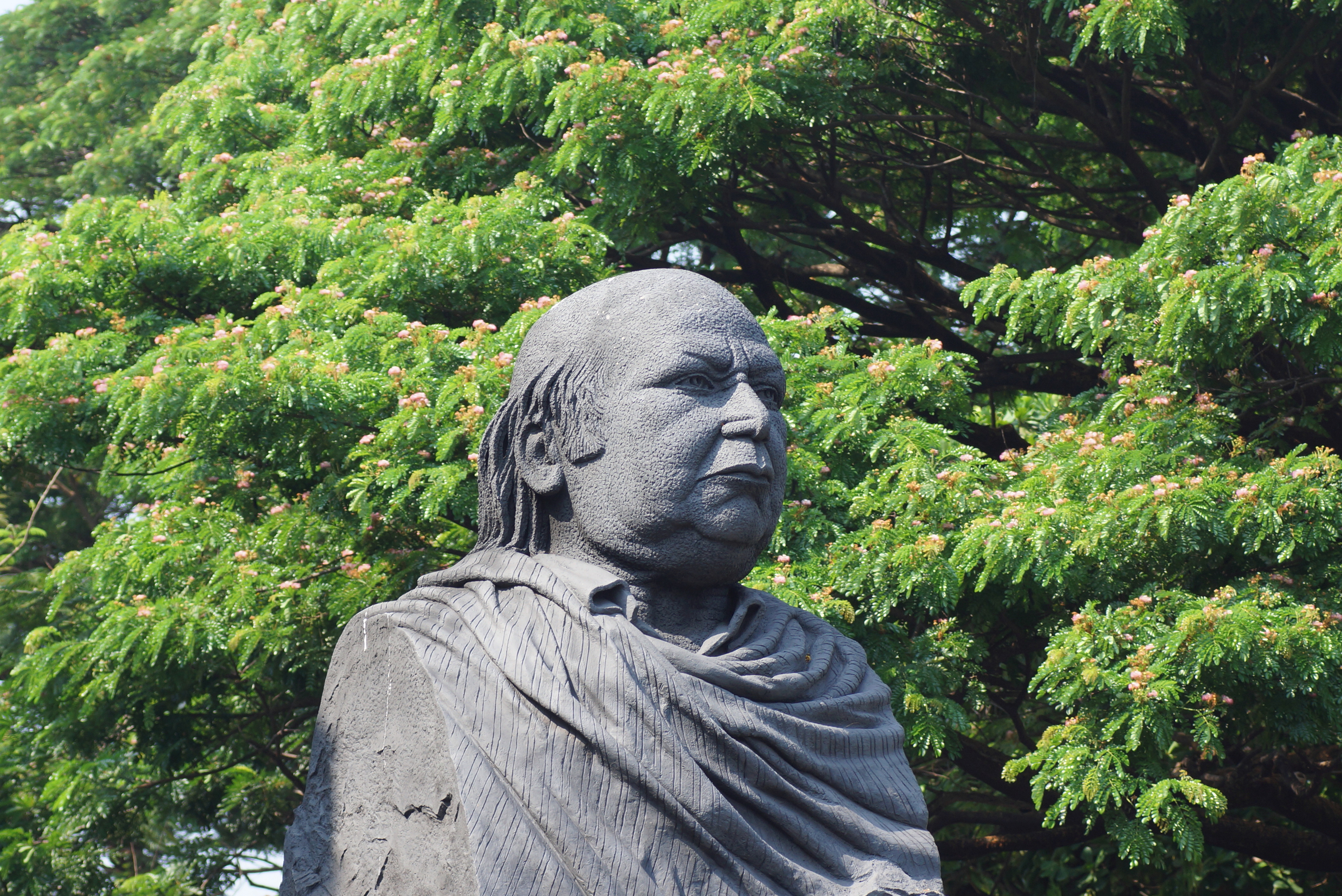
- Bust of K. T. located at Kozhikode
- Born: 29 September 1927
- Died: 25 March 2008 (aged 80)
- Occupation: Playwright
- Spouse: Zeenath (m. 1981; div. 1993)

K. T. Mohammed (29 September 1927 – 25 March 2008), popularly known as KT, was a Malayalam playwright and screenwriter. He scripted some 40 stage plays, including Idhu Bhumiyanu (This is the Earth), considered to be his masterpiece. He also wrote screenplays for about 20 films, including Kandam Becha Kottu, Thurakkatha Vathil, Moodupadam, and Kadalpalam. Mohammed was a recipient of the Sangeet Natak Akademi Award.

== Biography ==
Mohammed was born in Manjeri in Malappuram district as the eldest son of a police constable Kunjumuhammed and had very little formal education. After schooling he worked as a clerk in the postal department.

In 1952, he got the first prize in an all-India short story contest for his story Kannukal (Eyes) which was later translated into many foreign languages. He was an active member of Brothers Music Club of Kozhikode which was the training ground of many famous artists. He worked as the editor of Chithrakarthika weekly for a brief period of time. He started Sangamam Theatre a professional drama troupe which staged many of his famous plays both inside and outside the state. In 1971, he was nominated as the Chairman of Kerala Sangeetha Nataka Akademi and in 1974 as Chairman of Kerala State Film Development Corporation.

He married actress Zeenath and that relation ended in divorce. The couple has a son Jithin. He died on 25 March 2008 at Pavangad, Kozhikode.

== Selected plays ==
- Oorum Perum (A Person with Name and Dignity)
- Avar Theerumanikkunnu (They are Deciding)
- Karavatta Pashu (The Cow that Stopped Milking)
- Manushyan Karagruhathil (Man in Prison)
- Ithu Bhoomiyanu (This is the Earth)
- Kaffar
- Acchanum Bappayum
- Naalkkavala (The Junction)
- Njan Pedikkunnu (I am Getting Frightened)
- Kainathikal
- his one of the work is Baburaj.
- Pendulam
- Kalithokku (The Toy Gun)
- Operation Theatre
- Srishti (The Creation)
- Sthithi
- Samharam (The Annihilation)
- Sakshatkaram (The Fulfillment)
- Samanwayam (The Union)
- Sanatanum (The Eternal)
- Sannaham
- Vellapokkam (The Flood)
- Deepasthambam Mahashcharyam
- " Soothradharan"

== Awards ==
- Kerala State Film Awards twice, for the Best Screenwriting; Kadalpalam, 1969 and Achanum Bappayum, 1972
- Kerala Sangeetha Nataka Akademi Fellowship, 1982
- Sangeet Natak Akademi Award, 1986
- Bahrain Keraleeya Samajam "Sahithya Award", 2005
