= Chukku =

- Directed by: K. S. Sethumadhavan
- Written by: Thakazhi Sivasankara Pillai; Thoppil Bhasi (dialogues)
- Produced by: M. O. Joseph
- Starring: Madhu; Sheela; Adoor Bhasi; Muthukulam Raghavan Pillai
- Cinematography: Balu Mahendra
- Music by: G. Devarajan
- Production company: Manjilas
- Distributed by: Manjilas
- Release date: 28 September 1973
- Country: India
- Language: Malayalam

Chukku is a 1973 Indian Malayalam film, directed by K. S. Sethumadhavan and produced by M. O. Joseph. The film stars Madhu, Sheela, Adoor Bhasi and Muthukulam Raghavan Pillai in the lead roles. The film had musical score by G. Devarajan.

== Cast ==
- Madhu as Chackochan
- Sheela as Molly
- M G Soman
- Janardhanan
- Adoor Bhasi as Mathayichan
- Muthukulam Raghavan Pillai as Paulochan
- Sankaradi as Kammath
- Bahadoor as Anthony
- Kuttyedathi Vilasini as Mary
- Master Raghu
- Reena
- Sujatha as Clara
- Vanchiyoor Radha as Chackochan's Mother

== Soundtrack ==
The music was composed by G. Devarajan and the lyrics were written by Vayalar Ramavarma.

No.	Song	Singers	Lyrics	Length (m:ss)
1	"Ishtapraaneshwari"	P. Jayachandran	Vayalar Ramavarma	
2	"Kaadambareepushpa Sadassil"	P. Susheela	Vayalar Ramavarma	
3	"Sankrama Vishuppakshi"	P. Leela	Vayalar Ramavarma	
4	"Vellikkurishu"	P. Madhuri	Vayalar Ramavarma	
5	"Venchandralekhayorapsara Sthree"	K. J. Yesudas	Vayalar Ramavarma	
6	"Yarusalemile"	P. Susheela, P. Jayachandran	Vayalar Ramavarma	
