= Pamman =

Indian Malayalam novelist

R. Parmeswara Menon
- Kollam
- Born: 28 February 1920
- Died: 3 June 2007 (aged 87)
- Writing career
- Pen name: Pamman
- Language: Malayalam

Pamman (28 February 1920 – 3 June 2007; born R. Parmeswara Menon) was a Malayalam novelist from Kollam, Kerala, India.

== Life ==
He is best known for his novels which grapple with the sensual imagery of the human psyche. He has also written the script for several Malayalam movies. Some of his novels were made into films, including Chattakari and Adimakal. He won the Kerala State Film Award twice. He was employed as a General Manager for Western Railway and was based in Bombay.

== Works ==
His works include:

- Bhraanthu
- Chattakari
- Adimakal
- Missi
- Thamburatti
- Ammini Ammavan
- Nerippodu
- Orumbattaval
- Appu
- Vashalan
- Samaram
- Chakravatham
- Devagandhari
- Karppoorathulasiyude Manam
- Chathurangam
- Paapamoksham
- Karmmayogi
- Ashtamathil Shani
- Poochakkannulla Pennungal
- Odukkam
- Vazhi Pizhachavar
- Panchavatiyile Gandharvam
- Sister
- Nirbhagyajaathakam
- Thiranottam
- Kuttasammatham
- Ezhunnallathu-stories
- Orupidi Nizhalukal

== Filmography ==
- Nizhal Nijamagiradhu (1978) Tamil language feature film adaptation of Adimakal
