= Sthanarthi Saramma =

- Directed by: K. S. Sethumadhavan
- Written by: Muttathu Varkey; S. L. Puram Sadanandan (dialogues)
- Screenplay by: K. S. Sethumadhavan
- Produced by: T. E. Vasudevan
- Starring: Prem Nazir; Sheela; Adoor Bhasi; Muthukulam Raghavan Pillai
- Edited by: T. R. Sreenivasalu
- Music by: L. P. R. Varma
- Production company: Jaya Maruthi
- Release date: 2 December 1966
- Country: India
- Language: Malayalam

Sthanarthi Saramma is a 1966 Indian Malayalam-language film, directed by K. S. Sethumadhavan and produced by T. E. Vasudevan. The film stars Prem Nazir, Sheela, Adoor Bhasi and Muthukulam Raghavan Pillai. It was released on 2 December 1966.

== Cast ==
- Prem Nazir as Johny
- Sheela as Saramma
- Adoor Bhasi as Shasthrikal
- Muthukulam Raghavan Pillai as Anthoni
- Sankaradi as Chandi
- T. R. Omana as Subhadramma
- Prathapachandran as Kuriachan
- G. K. Pillai Thonniyedathu Thomachan
- Joseph Chacko
- Kunjandi as Gopala Pilla
- Meena as Rosamma
- Nellikode Bhaskaran as Velan Mathai
- Panjabi as Variar
- Pankajavalli as Mariyamma
- Santo Krishnan
- S.Shobha as Chinnamma

== Soundtrack ==
The music was composed by L. P. R. Varma and the lyrics were written by Vayalar Ramavarma.

| Song | Singers |
|---|---|
| "Akkarappachayile" | K. J. Yesudas, P. Leela |
| "Akkarappachayile" (F) | S. Janaki |
| "Kaaveri Theerathu" | Renuka |
| "Kaduvappetti" | Adoor Bhasi |
| "Kuruvippetti" | Adoor Bhasi |
| "Tharivalakilukile" | |
| "Thottupoy" | Chorus, Uthaman |
| "Yarusalemin Naadha" | P. Leela, Chorus |
| "Zindabaad Zindabaad" | Adoor Bhasi |
