= K. S. Sethumadhavan =

Indian film director (1931–2021)

- Born: Kurukkalpadam Subrahmanyam Sethumadhavan; 15 May 1931; Palghat, Malabar District, Madras Presidency, British India (present day Palakkad, Kerala, India)
- Died: 24 December 2021 (aged 90); Chennai, Tamil Nadu, India
- Occupations: Film director; Screenwriter
- Years active: 1960–1995
- Awards: Director of Best Film; 1991 – Marupakkam (Tamil)

Kurukkalpadam Subrahmanyam Sethumadhavan (15 May 1931 – 24 December 2021) was an Indian film director and screenwriter who worked predominantly in Malayalam cinema. He also directed films in Hindi, Tamil, Kannada and Telugu.

Active from the early 1960s to the mid-1990s, he directed over 60 movies including many landmark films in the Malayalam film history such as Odayil Ninnu, Yakshi, Kadalpalam, Achanum Bappayum, Ara Nazhika Neram, Panitheeratha Veedu, Anubhavangal Palichakal, Punarjanmam and Oppol.

He won numerous awards including ten National Film Awards and nine Kerala State Film Awards, four of them for Best Direction. In 2009, he was awarded the J. C. Daniel Award, Government of Kerala's highest honour for contributions to the Malayalam cinema.

== Life and career ==
K. S. Sethumadhavan was born to Subrahmanyam and Lakshmiyamma at Palghat, Madras Presidency, British India on 15 May 1931. He had three sisters and one brother. His childhood was spent in Palakkad and in North Arcot, Tamil Nadu. He completed his degree in biology from Government Victoria College, Palakkad. He debuted in the film industry as an assistant director to K. Ramnath. He later assisted directors L. V. Prasad, A. S. A. Swamy, and Sunder Rao Nadkarni.

He debuted as an independent film director with Veeravijaya, a Sinhalese film in 1960. His first Malayalam film was Gnana Sundari, based on a short story by Muttathu Varkey, produced by T. E. Vasudevan under the banner of Associates Pictures. He then went on to direct over 60 films including noted films Odayil Ninnu, Daaham, Sthanarthi Saramma, Koottukudumbam, Vazhve Mayam, Ara Nazhika Neram, Anubhavangal Palichakal, Karakanakkadal, Achanum Bappayum, Punarjanmam, Chattakkari, Oppol, Marupakkam, Kannada Movie Manini.

His film Achanum Bappayum won the Nargis Dutt Award for Best Feature Film on National Integration, a part of National Film Awards, in 1973. His Tamil film Marupakkam won the National Film Award for Best Feature Film in 1991. Thus it became the first Tamil film to win the award, the feat was repeated by Kanchivaram in 2007.

In 1996, his Telugu film Stri won the National Film Award for Best Feature Film in Telugu. He won the Kerala State Film Award for Best Director 4 times: for films Ara Nazhika Neram (1970), Karakanakkadal (1971), Pani Theeratha Veedu (1972) and Oppol (1980). He was the jury member for the National Film Awards in 1975 and 1980. In 1982, he was the chairman of the jury for the Kerala State Film Awards. He was the chairman of the National Film Awards jury in 2002, and was awarded the J. C. Daniel Award for the year 2009, honouring his achievements and contribution to Malayalam Cinema. In 2011, he was honoured with the Chalachitra Ratnam Award by the Kerala Film Critics Association.

His son Santosh Sethumadhavan is also a filmmaker who remade the 1974 cult classic Chattakkari in 2012 but failed to create any impact, owing to the remake being overshadowed by the original film.

Sethumadhavan died at his home in Chennai on 24 December 2021, at the age of 90.

== Awards ==
Filmfare Awards South

- 1972 – Filmfare Award for Best Director - Malayalam : Punarjanmam
- 1973 – Filmfare Best Director Award (Malayalam) : Pani Theeratha Veedu
- 1974 – Filmfare Best Director Award (Malayalam) : Chattakari
- 1980 – Filmfare Best Director Award (Malayalam) : Oppol

Kerala State Film Awards

- 1970 – Best Director : Aranazhika Neram
- 1971 – Best Director : Karakanakadal
- 1971 – Third Best Film: Karakanakadal
- 1972 – Best Director : Panitheeratha Veedu
- 1972 – Best Film: Pani Theeratha Veedu
- 1974 – Second Best Film: Chattakari
- 1980 – Best Director : Oppol
- 1980 – Best Film: Oppol
- 2009 – J. C. Daniel Award

Nandi Awards

- 1995 – Nandi Special Jury Award for Stri

National Film Awards

- 1965 – Best Feature Film in Malayalam for Odayil Ninnu
- 1969 – Best Feature Film in Malayalam for Adimakal
- 1971 – Best Feature Film in Malayalam for Karakanakadal
- 1972 – Best Film on National Integration for Achanum Bappayum
- 1972 – Best Feature Film in Malayalam for Panitheeratha Veedu
- 1980 – Second Best Feature Film for Oppol
- 1990 – Best Feature Film for Marupakkam
- 1990 – Best Screenplay for Marupakkam
- 1994 – Best Feature Film in Tamil for Nammavar
- 1995 – Best Feature Film in Telugu for Stri

== Selected filmography ==
- Jnana Sundari (1961)
- Kannum Karalum (1962)
- Susheela (1963)
- Nithya Kanyaka (1963)
- Omanakuttan (1964)
- Manavatty (1964)
- Anna (1964)
- Odeyil Ninnu (1965)
- Daaham (1965)
- Sthanarthy Saramma (1966)
- Rowdy (1966)
- Archana (1966)
- Ollathu Mathi (1967)
- Naadan Pennu (1967)
- Kottayam Kolacase (1967)
- Yakshi (1968)
- Thokkukal Katha Parayunnu (1968)
- Paal Manam (1968) - Tamil
- Bharyamar Sookshikkuka (1968)
- Kootu Kudumbam (1969)
- Kadalpalam (1969)
- Adimakal (1969)
- Kalyaana Oorvalam (1970) - Tamil
- Vazhve Mayam (1970)
- Mindapennu (1970)
- Kuttavali (1970)
- Kalpana (1970)
- Ara Nazhika Neram (1970)
- Amma Enna Stree (1970)
- Thettu (1971)
- Oru Penninte Katha (1971)
- Line Bus (1971)
- Karakanakadal (1971)
- Inqulab Zindabbad (1971)
- Anubhavangal Paalichakal (1971)
- Punarjanmam (1972)
- Devi (1972)
- Aadhyathe Katha (1972)
- Achanum Bappayum (1972)
- Panitheeratha Veedu (1973)
- Kaliyugam (1973)
- Chukku (1973)
- Azhakulla Saleena (1973)
- Kanyakumari (1974)
- Jeevikkan Marannu Poya Sthree (1974)
- Chattakari (1974)
- Naalai Namadhe (1975) - Tamil
- Makkal (1975)
- Chuvanna Sandhyakal (1975)
- Julie (1975) - Hindi
- Priyamvada (1976)
- Ormakal Marikkumo (1977)
- Amme Anupame (1977)
- Yehi Hai Zindagi (1977) - Hindi
- Nakshathrangale Kaaval (1978)
- Manini (1979) - Kannada
- Oppol (1980)
- Nijangal (1982) - Tamil
- Ariyatha Veethikal (1984)
- Aarorumariyathe (1984)
- Avidathepole Ivideyum (1985)
- Sunil Vayassu 20 (1986)
- Venal Kinavukal (1991)
- Marupakkam (1991) - Tamil
- Nammavar (1994) - Tamil
- Stri (1995) - Telugu
