= Sanchari =

1981 Indian film

- Theatrical release poster
- Directed by: Boban Kunchacko
- Written by: P. K. Sarangapani
- Produced by: Boban Kunchacko
- Starring: Prem Nazir; Jayan; K. P. Ummer; Mohanlal; Adoor Bhasi
- Cinematography: U. Rajagopal
- Edited by: T. R. Sekhar
- Music by: K. J. Yesudas (songs); Guna Singh (score)
- Production company: Excel Productions
- Distributed by: Excel Productions
- Release date: 26 February 1981
- Country: India
- Language: Malayalam

Sanchari (transl. Traveller) is a 1981 Indian Malayalam-language drama film produced and directed by Boban Kunchacko and written by P. K. Sarangapani. It stars Prem Nazir, Jayan, K. P. Ummer, Mohanlal, and Adoor Bhasi. The film features songs composed by K. J. Yesudas and background score by Guna Singh.

The film is best known for the song "Rasoole Nin Kanivaale".

== Plot ==
Sunderasan Nair and Soudamini, both are from wealthy families. Soudamini is concerned about her brothers Keshavan and Vasu who live together with Kotha, while Kotha is jealous of Soudamini. Soudamini invites her brothers to stay with them, but Kotha's sons Bargavan and Sekhar are teased by Soudamini's sons for their lack of manners and sense.

Kotha becomes more jealous, and one day Soudamini slips on a banana peel that was thrown by Kotha's son. The injury results in Soudamini developing amnesia, ceasing to recognise anyone she knows. One day Vasu murders Sunderasan, resulting in the house finally belonging to Keshavan and Kotha. Sekar grows up and becomes a doctor, but Bargavan and Shubha are brought up as servants.

== Cast ==
- Prem Nazir as Dhwaja, Sumesh and Suresh (triple role)
- Jayan as Bhargavan
- K. P. Ummer as Mammad
- Mohanlal as Sekhar
- Sankaradi as Sankaran
- Shubha as Shubha
- Unnimary as Sumuki
- Santhakumari as Saudamini
- Roja Ramani as Sumam
- N. Govindankutty as Vaasu
- G. K. Pillai as Keshavan
- Shyama as Young Sumam
- Sukumari as Kotha/Kadambari
- Thikkurussy Sukumaran Nair as Sundareshan Nair
- Bahadoor as Sankaran
- Alummoodan as E. D. Palpu
- S. P. Pillai as Palpu's father
- Premji as Vaidyar
- Jagathy Sreekumar as Mani
- Kaduvakulam Antony as Hospital attendant

== Production ==
Filming took place at Udaya Studios. Mohanlal was cast as the main villain. Thyagarajan was the fight choreographer.

== Soundtrack ==
The film's songs were composed by K. J. Yesudas, with lyrics by Yusufali Kechery. Yesudas, as usual, composed tunes after the lyrics were written, except for the song "Rasoole Nin Kanivaale". For this piece, director Kunchacko referred him to an Arabic song and recommended that he compose a Muslim devotional track in the same scale. In Athisayaragam, his biography by Ravi Menon, Yesudas noted the irony that such inspirational songs often became more popular than his original works. The song blended qawwali and Mappila musical traditions, with lyrics serving as a hymn to the Prophet Muhammad. The song became widely successful among Malayali audiences. Shajan C. Mathew, author of Yesudas' biography Ithihaasa Gaayakan: Yesudasinte Sangeetham, Jeevitham, called it Yesudas' most successful composition. Background score was provided by Guna Singh.

Track listing

No.	Song	Singers	Lyrics	Length
1	"Anuraaga Vallari"	K. J. Yesudas, S. Janaki	Yusufali Kechery	
2	"Ivide Manushyanenthu Vila"	K. J. Yesudas	Yusufali Kechery	
3	"Kamaneeya Malarmeni"	P. Susheela, Vani Jairam, B. Vasantha	Yusufali Kechery	
4	"Karppoora Deepam Thelinju"	Sujatha Mohan, Chorus	Yusufali Kechery	
5	"Rasoole Nin Kanivaale"	K. J. Yesudas	Yusufali Kechery	
6	"Shyaamadharaniyil"	K. J. Yesudas	Yusufali Kechery	
7	"Thaliraninju Malaraninju"	K. J. Yesudas, S. Janaki	Yusufali Kechery	

== Release ==
The film was released on 26 February 1981, after the death of actor Jayan. It had a good run in theatres.
