= Boban Kunchacko =

Indian filmmaker and actor

- Born: 3 January 1949; Kerala, India
- Died: 9 July 2004 (aged 55)
- Occupations: Producer; director; actor
- Years active: 1952 – 1986/1987
- Spouse: Molly
- Children: 3 (including Kunchacko Boban)
- Father: Kunchacko

Boban Kunchacko (9 January 1949 – 9 July 2004) was an Indian film producer, director, and actor, known for his work in Malayalam cinema. The son of filmmaker Kunchacko, he succeeded his father in helming Udaya Studios and its production wing, Excel Productions. He is the father of actor Kunchacko Boban.

== Early life ==
Boban was born on 3 January 1949 to Annamma and Kunchacko of the Maliampurakal family. He had three sisters—Molly, Sumi and Tessi. His father was a film producer, who established the first film studio in Kerala, Udaya Studios.

His grandfather, M. M. Chacko, started the first boat service in Kuttanadu. His uncle M. C. Punnoose, known as Navodaya Appachan was known for his work in Malayalam cinema, especially as the founder of Navodaya Studio. His cousin is Jijo Punnose, who is a film director.

== Career ==
Boban stepped into film industry as a child actor, debuting in Achan (1952).

Following the death of Kunchacko in 1976, the ownership of Udaya Studios passed to Boban. Boban had already been producing films under the Udaya banner and was also engaged in other business ventures, including the operation of the Excel Glass Factory. However, financial difficulties eventually forced him to sell portions of the studio premises to V. J. T. Films.

In 1981, his directorial Sanchari was released, which starred Prem Nazir, Jayan, and Mohanlal. The film is best known for the song "Rasoole Nin Kanivaale" composed by K. J. Yesudas. The song was inspired from an Arabic song which Boban referred to Yesudas. Shajan C. Mathew, author of Yesudas' biography Ithihaasa Gaayakan: Yesudasinte Sangeetham, Jeevitham, called the song Yesudas' most successful composition.

In 1986/1987, Anaswara Ganangal produced by Boban, marked the final film under the Udaya banner. It was a film compiled largely from songs of earlier Udaya productions. Boban continued to be active in the film industry until his death in 2004.

== Personal life ==
Boban was married to Molly and they had three children: Kunchacko, Anu, and Meenu. Boban died on 9 July 2004.

== Filmography ==
Directed

- 1980: Paalattu Kunjikannan
- 1981: Sanchari
- 1985: Aazhi

Produced

- 1966: Anarkali
- 1970: Ningalenne Communistakki
- 1971: Lora Neeyevide
- 1977: Achaaram Ammini Osharam Omana
- 1977: Kannappanunni
- 1978: Aanappaachan
- 1980: Paalattu Kunjikannan
- 1981: Dhanya
- 1981: Sanchari
- 1983: Sandhya Mayangum Neram
- 1983: Theeram Thedunna Thira
- 1985: Aazhi

Acted

- 1952: Achan
- 1954: Avan Varunnu
- 1955: Kidappadam
- 1960: Neeli Saali
