= Manishada =

- Directed by: Kunchacko
- Written by: Sarangapani
- Screenplay by: Sarangapani
- Produced by: Kunchacko
- Starring: Prem Nazir; Srividya; Adoor Bhasi; Sreelatha Namboothiri
- Cinematography: U. Rajagopal
- Edited by: T. R. Sekhar
- Music by: G. Devarajan
- Production company: Excel Productions
- Distributed by: Excel Productions
- Release date: 28 February 1975
- Country: India
- Language: Malayalam

Manishada is a 1975 Indian Malayalam-language film, directed and produced by Kunchacko. The film stars Prem Nazir, Srividya, Adoor Bhasi and Sreelatha Namboothiri in the lead roles. The film has musical score by G. Devarajan.

== Cast ==
- Prem Nazir as Gopi
- Srividya as Sumathi
- Adoor Bhasi as Moosa
- Sreelatha Namboothiri
- T. R. Omana as Karthyayani
- Bahadoor as Koya
- K. P. Ummer as Kareem
- Sumithra as Sainaba
- Thikkurissy Sukumaran Nair as Panakkal Ashan
- Ushakumari as Jameela
- Adoor Bhavani
- Adoor Pankajam as Sathyabhama
- Meena as Meenakshi
- G. K. Pillai
- Kaduvakulam Antony
- Alummoodan as Ouseph
- N. Govindankutty as Vikraman
- Master Raghu as Young Kareem
- Gopi

== Soundtrack ==
The music was composed by G. Devarajan.

No.	Song	Singers	Lyrics	Length (m:ss)
1	"Andramatha"	P. Susheela	Anusettisubba Rao	
2	"Cheerppukal"	Girija	Kannadasan	
3	"Kaaladippuzhayude"	P. Madhuri	Vayalar	
4	"Kalyaanamaala"	Vani Jayaram	Kannadasan	
5	"Kandam Vechoru Kottitta"	P. Jayachandran, B. Vasantha, Latha Raju	Vayalar	
6	"Kanden"	Girija	Vayalar	
7	"Kanyakumariyum Kashmeerum"	P. Madhuri, Vani Jayaram, B. Vasantha	Vayalar	
8	"Maa Nishaada"	K. J. Yesudas	Vayalar	
9	"Manipravaala"	K. J. Yesudas	Vayalar	
10	"Pankajaakshan"	Girija	Vayalar	
11	"Raathriyile Narthakikal"	K. J. Yesudas, P. Madhuri, Chorus	Vayalar	
12	"Thaamarapoonkaavil"	Girija, Pattanakkad Purushothaman	Vayalar	
13	"Vilwamangalathinu"	K. J. Yesudas	Vayalar	
