= Aanappaachan =

1978 film

- Directed by: A. Vincent
- Written by: P. K. Sarangapani
- Produced by: Boban Kunchacko
- Starring: Prem Nazir; Jayan; Sheela; Adoor Bhasi
- Cinematography: Jayanan Vincent
- Music by: G. Devarajan
- Production company: Udaya Studios
- Distributed by: Udaya Studios
- Release date: 4 August 1978
- Country: India
- Language: Malayalam

Aanappaachan is a 1978 Indian Malayalam film, directed by A. Vincent and produced by Boban Kunchacko. The film stars Prem Nazir, Jayan, Sheela and Adoor Bhasi in the lead roles. The film has musical score by G. Devarajan.

== Cast ==
- Prem Nazir as Paachan/Bhaskaran, Gopi (double role)
- Jayan as Paramu
- Sheela as Sundari
- [Kainakary Thankaraj]
- Adoor Bhasi as Beeran Kaakka
- Jose as Suresh
- Vijayavani as Susheela
- Kainakari Thangaraj as Shankaran
- Aranmula Ponnamma as Sarojini Amma
- G. K. Pillai as Janardhanan B. A.
- Mallika Sukumaran as Girly
- Master Manohar as Pottan Kutty
- Premji as Appu Nair
- Reena as Usha

== Soundtrack ==
The music was composed by G. Devarajan and the lyrics were written by P. Bhaskaran.

No.	Song	Singers	Lyrics	Length (m:ss)
1	"Ajnaatha Theerangalil"	K. J. Yesudas	P. Bhaskaran	
2	"Ee Mizhi Kaanumbol"	P. Susheela	P. Bhaskaran	
3	"Ee Swargamennaal"	P. Jayachandran, C. O. Anto	P. Bhaskaran	
4	"Muttu MuttuThappittam Muttu"	P. Madhuri, C. O. Anto, Karthikeyan	P. Bhaskaran	
5	"Oru Jaathi Oru Matham"	Pattanakkad Purushothaman	P. Bhaskaran	
