= Paalattu Kunjikannan =

- Directed by: Boban Kunchacko
- Written by: P. K. Sarangapani
- Produced by: Boban Kunchacko
- Starring: Prem Nazir; Jayan; Jagathy Sreekumar
- Cinematography: U. Rajagopal
- Edited by: T. R. Sekhar
- Music by: G. Devarajan
- Production company: Excel Productions
- Distributed by: Excel Productions
- Release date: 14 August 1980
- Country: India
- Language: Malayalam

Paalattu Kunjikannan is a 1980 Indian Malayalam-language swashbuckler film directed and produced by Boban Kunchacko. The film stars Prem Nazir, Jayan and Jagathy Sreekumar. The film has musical score by G. Devarajan.

== Plot ==
Palattu Kunjikannan is in love with the Princess Aaryamala. His friend Vanchiyoor Surasu, a brave warrior and martial arts guru, promises to support him in his quest. But then Surasu falls in love with Ponni the daughter of the Gurukkal with whom Kunjikannan is supposed to fight a duel. Ponni makes Surasu promise that he will persuade Kunjikannan not to kill the Gurukkal if he surrenders. In the duel Kunjikannan manages to keep the letter of his promise to Surasu to not spill a drop of Gurukkal's blood, but kills him all the same. Surasu is disappointed but understanding and he makes his way to Ponni's house to make amends. Ponni is angry with what she perceives as Surasu's betrayal. Kunjikannan weds the princess Aaryamala while Ponni decides to forgive Surasu and leave with him to Kadthanadu after she saves him from her cousin/friend who plots to murder him.

== Cast ==
- Prem Nazir as Palattu Kunjikannan
- Jayan as Vanchiyoor Surasu
- Jayabharathi as Aaryamala
- Unnimary as Ponni
- Jagathy Sreekumar as Foot Soldier
- Thikkurissy Sukumaran Nair as Kunjikannan's grandfather
- Bobby Kottarakkara as Drummer boy
- Alummoodan
- G. K. Pillai as Kadavathoor Gurukkal
- Ratheesh as Kunjikannan's father
- Janardanan as Thampikutti
- Kaduvakulam Antony as Foot Soldier
- N. Govindankutty as Padakuruppu
- P. K. Abraham as Maharajah of Sreerangam
- Premji as Temple Priest
- S. P. Pillai
- Santhakumari (Malayalam actress) as Chirutheyi
- Roja Ramani as Kunjulekshmi
- jyothilakshmi and jayamalini as dancers in sapthaswarangal unarnu song

== Soundtrack ==
The music was composed by G. Devarajan with lyrics by Yusufali Kechery.

No.	Song	Singers	Lyrics	Length (m:ss)
1	"Chanchalaakshi"	K. J. Yesudas	Yusufali Kechery	
2	"Kadalezhum Thaandivanna"	K. J. Yesudas, P. Madhuri	Yusufali Kechery	
3	"Mandaarappoonkaatte"	P. Susheela, P. Madhuri, Chorus	Yusufali Kechery	
4	"Paattonnu Paadunnen"	K. J. Yesudas	Yusufali Kechery	
5	"Parithraanaaya" (Bit)	K. J. Yesudas		
6	"Premagaayaka Jeevagaayaka"	P. Susheela	Yusufali Kechery	
7	"Sapthaswarangalunarnnu"	K. J. Yesudas	Yusufali Kechery	
8	"Thulunaadan Pattudutha"	P. Susheela	Yusufali Kechery	
