= Umma (1960 film) =

- Directed by: Kunchacko
- Written by: Screenplay: Vimal; Dialogues: P. K. Sarangapani; Novel: Moidu Padiyath
- Produced by: Kunchacko
- Starring: Thikkurissy Sukumaran Nair; K. P. Ummer; B. S. Saroja
- Edited by: S. Williams
- Music by: M. S. Baburaj; Lyrics: P. Bhaskaran
- Production company: Udaya
- Distributed by: Excel Productions
- Release date: 29 March 1960
- Country: India
- Language: Malayalam

Umma (English: Mother) is a 1960 Malayalam social drama film directed and produced by Kunchacko in his directorial debut. The screenplay is written by Vimal and the dialogues by the debutant P. K. Sarangapani. The film is based on the novel of the same name by Moidu Padiyath. It was the first Muslim social film in Malayalam. The story revolves around marital evils that prevailed in the Muslim community, particularly in the Malabar region.

The film was a box office success and gained critical praise. The famous song "Kadalivaazhakayyilirunnu" is from this film. The film is shot in Wayanad.

== Plot ==
Polygamy is the theme of the film. An illiterate rich landlord Aboobacker Haji married three times and divorced all three of his wives. His plans is marry again which according to traditions will be his last marriage. He marries Ibrahim Kakka's daughter Ayisha. Ayisha gives birth to a daughter and a maidservant named Khadeeja is appointed to take care of the child.

Haji eventually develops a desire to marry Khadeeja. Though this was against custom, nobody was dare to question him. Haji divorces Ayisha, who seeks refuge in Ibrahim Kakka's house. She sends her daughter Zainaba to school ignoring protests from the community. Zainaba falls in love with her classmate Hameed. When Haji learns of this affair, he tries to take his daughter with him, which is opposed by Ayisha and Ibrahim Kakka. They decide to conduct the marriage of Zainaba with Hameed. The marriage did not take place as Haji interrupted. Haji takes Zainaba to his house where she faces tortures from her stepmother Khadeeja.

Meanwhile, Ibrahim Kakka dies. Haji arranges Zainaba's marriage with a rich jewellery shop owner. Haji's mother Pathumma comes to the help of her granddaughter. She pleads with the Haji to change his decision. At this moment in time Haji learns of Khadeeja's cruel tricks. His heart melts and he withdraws from his decision. In the end, Zainaba marries Hameed.

== Cast ==
- Thikkurissy Sukumaran Nair as Abobacker Haji
- B. S. Saroja as Ayisha
- Rajakumari as Zainaba
- K. P. Ummer as Hameed
- K. Sadanandan as Ibrahim Kakka
- Kanchana as Khadeeja
- S. P. Pillai as Vattathil Kurup, the crooked manager of Haji
- L. Ponnamma as Pathumma, Haji's mother
- Bahadur
- S. J. Dev
- Rajamma
- Nirmala Devi
- Changanasseri Thankam
- T. V. Mathew
- Krishnakumari
- Pushpam
- Alex
- P. B. Pillai

== Soundtrack ==
All lyrics are written by P. Bhaskaran; all music is composed by M. S. Baburaj.

No.	Title	Artist(s)	Length
1.	"Appam Thinnaan Thappukottu"	Jikki
2.	"En Kanninte Kadaviladuthaal"	P. Leela, A. M. Rajah
3.	"Kadalivaazhakayyilirunnu"	Jikki
4.	"Kadha Parayaamen Kadha"	P. Leela
5.	"Kanneerenthinu Vaanambaadi"	P. B. Sreenivas, Choir
6.	"Konchunna Painkili"	P. Leela, Choir
7.	"Kuyile Kuyile"	P. Leela, M. S. Baburaj, A. M. Rajah
8.	"Nithyasahaaya Naadhe"	Jikki, Choir
9.	"Paalaanu Thenaanen"	A. M. Rajah
10.	"Pettammayaakum"	P. Leela
11.	"Poru Nee Ponmayile"	P. Leela, A. M. Rajah
12.	"Raariro Raarariro"	Jikki
13.	"Thallaanum Kollaanum"	P. B. Sreenivas
14.	"Velikku Kaanumbam"	Mehboob
