= Achaaram Ammini Osharam Omana =

- Poster
- Directed by: Adoor Bhasi
- Written by: P. K. Sarangapani
- Produced by: Kunchacko
- Starring: Prem Nazir; Jayan; Sheela; Sukumari
- Cinematography: U. Rajagopal
- Edited by: T. R. Sekhar
- Music by: G. Devarajan
- Production company: Excel Productions
- Distributed by: Excel Productions
- Release date: 23 December 1977
- Country: India
- Language: Malayalam

Achaaram Ammini Osharam Omana (transl. "Earnest money" Ammini, "free gift" Omana) is a 1977 Indian Malayalam-language film directed by Adoor Bhasi, written by P. K. Sarangapani, and produced by Boban Kunchacko. The film stars Prem Nazir, Jayan, Sheela and Sukumari in the lead roles. The film has musical score by G. Devarajan. The film was shot in Udaya Studios.

== Plot ==
Ammini is the daughter of Sivan Pilla Muthalaali. Sivan Pillai was one of the richest men in the locality years ago. However, he spoiled all wealth once he became addicted to gambling. Now they are staying in a house whose condition is pathetic. Ammini joins the police and is appointed as traffic police constable in the locality, which Sivan Pilla can't accept. After watching a young and energetic Ammini, a medical representative Sudhakaran falls for her. Sudhakaran comes to Ammini's house and asks for her hand. When Sivan Pillai and his wife Padmavathi were about to accept the proposal, Ammini says that she is not prepared for the marriage now and she will think about it only after 5 years. A dejected Sivan Pillai, with the remaining money in hand, decides to restart the business of wood export along with his staff Kittu Pillai and leaves home.

Gopala Pillai is the flute player in a temple along with Paakaran who plays the drum. Paakaran's father had initially married Paruvamma. After Paakaran's birth, his father died and Gopala Pillai had married Paruvamma, and they had three children – Sudhakaran, Ravikumar, and Urmila. They all were staying in the house which was owned by Paakaran's father. Before death, Paakaran's father had written the note that he is transferring all his wealth to Paruvamma and that when Paakaran attains the right age, Paruvamma has to transfer all that she likes to Paakaran. However, Paruvamma behaves like all the wealth belongs to her and treats Paakaran like a servant, often denying him food and making him do all the household activities including kitchen work. Paruvamma's behaviour towards her current husband (Gopala Pillai) is also very bad. However, she is very keen about her sons and daughter. Her elder son Sudhakaran is against the harsh behaviour of Paruvamma towards Paakaran, and once they argue about this, Sudhakaran leaves the house. Sudhakaran often visits Ammini's parents, however Ammini stands stern with her decision to marry only after five years.

Kappalandi Kalyani is a street seller. Though appearing to be a peanut seller, she sells liquor manufactured illegally. Pankajakshan is one of her clients. Thankaraj, the police constable, who is behind the illegal liquor mafia, knows her as a peanut seller, but is unaware that she sells liquor. A boy asks her for a job, and she takes him to assist her and find out people asking for liquor.

Sivan Pilla and Kittu Pillai stay in a guest house, where they used to stay when they had done the same business long ago. Paulose is still the caretaker of the house. While they are in the woods, Kittu Pillai senses the presence of Ammini over there and the traces that it was Omana who was the illegal daughter of Sivan Pillai born to Dhakshayani. Omana was a lookalike of Ammini. Even Sivan Pillai was confused and they call to Sivan Pillai's house to confirm that Ammini is there. In order to prevent Dhakshayani from taking any revengeful action on Sivan Pillai, they frame a plan and get Omana married to Paakaran, and they succeed in doing so. Omana suffers a lot in Paakaran's house, and she bears it all. When Omana's mother and her friend Bhavani pay a visit to her house, they are treated badly by her mother-in-law (Paruvamma).

Ammini and her mother pay visit to Sivan Pillai in the guest house. While Ammini was roaming around in the forest, Dhakshayani mistakes her as her daughter Omana. When Ammini discovers that she too has a lookalike daughter, she says that she will visit her house another day.

Kalyani's assistant boy meets Thankaraj on the way. On insisting that he requires more liquor, the boy takes Thankaraj to Kalyani's warehouse, where Thankaraj discovers the real face of Kalyani, and they are arrested.

Bhavani meets Omana on way to market, and takes her to visit her mother Dhakshayani. At the same time, Ammini also visits Dhakshayani. On hearing about the difficulties faced by Omana with her in-laws, Ammini charts out a plan, and then dresses herself as Omana and leaves to her house. She then treats her in-laws rudely and teaches Paruvamma a lesson. She also succeeds in building a gentleman out of Pakkaran. She also succeeds to get Gopala Pillai and Pakkaran to protest against Paruvamma's cruelty.

On visiting a lawyer, Paakaran and Omana (who is actually Ammini) are informed that Paakaran's father had rightly written the document to transfer the wealth to Pakkaran, as Paruvamma should handle all that she likes to Pakkaran. On their way back they met the boy who was Kalyani's assistant and take him along.

Then finally they all met where Sivan Pillai resides, and the parenthood of Omana is being questioned. Though Sivan Pillai initially stands stern without accepting the fatherhood, ultimately he agrees. Ammini accepts for the wedding with Sudhakaran, and all ends fine.

== Cast ==
- Prem Nazir as Paakkaran
- Jayan as Sudhakaran
- Sheela as PC Ammini S. and Omana
- Sukumari as Padmavathi
- Kaviyoor Ponnamma as Dhakshayani
- Adoor Bhasi as Kittu Pilla
- Meena as Paruvamma
- Sreelatha Namboothiri as Bhavani
- Kainakary Thankaraj as a Police officer
- Unnimary as Urmila
- Adoor Pankajam as Kappalandi Kalyani
- Alummoodan as Gopala Pilla
- Janardanan as Ravikumar
- K. P. Ummer as Sivan Pilla Muthalali
- Master Raghu as Raghu
- S. P. Pillai as Paulose
- T. P. Madhavan as Pankajakshan

== Soundtrack ==
The music was composed by G. Devarajan.

No.	Song	Singers	Lyrics	Length (m:ss)
1	"Aaraattukadavil"	K. J. Yesudas, P. Madhuri	P. Bhaskaran	
2	"Chakkikkothoru Chankaran"	P. Jayachandran, P. Madhuri	P. Bhaskaran	
3	"Kaalamakiya Padakkuthira"	K. J. Yesudas	P. Bhaskaran	
4	"Kunnikkuruvinte Kannezhuthi"	P. Susheela	P. Bhaskaran	
