= Seeta (1960 film) =

- Poster
- Directed by: Kunchacko
- Screenplay by: J. Sasikumar
- Produced by: M. Kunchacko
- Starring: Prem Nazir; Kusalakumari; Thikkurissy Sukumaran Nair; Hari
- Music by: V. Dakshinamoorthy
- Production company: Udaya
- Release date: 3 September 1960
- Country: India
- Language: Malayalam

Seeta is a 1960 Indian Malayalam-language film, directed and produced by Kunchacko, based on the Ramayana epic. The film stars Prem Nazir, Kusalakumari, Thikkurissy Sukumaran Nair and Hari. The musical score is by V. Dakshinamoorthy. Seetha was a box office hit.

== Cast ==
- Prem Nazir as Rama
- Kusalakumari as Sita
- Thikkurissy Sukumaran Nair as Valmiki
- Hari as Lava
- T. R. Omana as Malini
- Dr. N. Rajan Nair as Lakshmana
- J. Sasikumar as Vasishtha
- Kanchana as Kausalya
- S. P. Pillai as Mooshakan

== Soundtrack ==
The music was composed by V. Dakshinamoorthy, with R. K. Shekhar acting as his assistant to make musical arrangements. Seeta was the first film on which Dakshinamoorthy and Shekhar collaborated, and Shekhar would continue working as Dakshinamoorthy's assistant for the next fourteen years. Lyrics were written by Abhayadev. The song "Pattupadi Urakkam Njan", sung by P. Susheela, became a hit. This was Susheela's first Malayalam song.

No.	Song	Singers
1	"Kaanmu Njan"	P. B. Sreenivas
2	"Kanne Nukaru Swargasukham"	M. L. Vasanthakumari
3	"Lankayil Vaana"	P. B. Sreenivas
4	"Mangalam Neruka"	S. Janaki, Chorus
5	"Nerampoyi Nadanada"	V. Dakshinamoorthy, Jikki
6	"Paattupaadiyurakkaam"	P. Susheela
7	"Paavana Bharatha"	P. B. Sreenivas, A. M. Rajah
8	"Prajakalundo Prajakalundo"	P. B. Sreenivas, A. M. Rajah, Jikki, Punitha
9	"Raamaraajyathinte"	A. M. Rajah, Chorus
10	"Rama Rama"	A. M. Rajah, Chorus
11	"Seethe Lokamaathe"	P. B. Sreenivas
12	"Unni Pirannu"	A. M. Rajah, Chorus
13	"Veene Paaduka"	P. Susheela
