= Postmane Kananilla =

- Directed by: Kunchacko
- Written by: P. K. Sarangapani
- Screenplay by: P. K. Sarangapani
- Starring: Prem Nazir; Kalaikkal Kumaran; K. P. Ummer; Vijayasree; KPAC Lalitha; S. P. Pillai
- Cinematography: N. A. Thara
- Edited by: G. Venkittaraman
- Music by: G. Devarajan
- Production company: Excel Productions
- Distributed by: Excel Productions
- Release date: 22 December 1972
- Country: India
- Language: Malayalam

Postmane Kananilla ("Postman goes missing") is a 1972 Indian Malayalam-language film directed by Kunchacko. The film stars Prem Nazir, K. P. Ummer, Vijayasree and KPAC Lalitha. The film's score was composed by G. Devarajan.

== Cast ==
- Prem Nazir
- Krishnapillai
- K. P. Ummer
- Vijayasree
- KPAC Lalitha
- Adoor Bhasi
- Manavalan Joseph
- Adoor Pankajam
- Alummoodan
- Aryad Gopalakrishnan
- Baby Indira
- Kaduvakulam Antony
- Kavitha
- N. Govindankutty
- Paravoor Bharathan
- Philomina
- S. P. Pillai
- Vijayakala
- Vijayanirmala
- Jayan Uncredited role
- D. Philip

== Soundtrack ==
The music was composed by G. Devarajan with lyrics by Vayalar Ramavarma.

No.	Song	Singers	Lyrics	Length (m:ss)
1	"Eeshwaran Hinduvalla"	K. J. Yesudas	Vayalar Ramavarma	
2	"Enoru Swapnam..."	K. J. Yesudas, P. Madhuri	Vayalar Ramavarma	
3	"Hippikalude Nagaram"	K. J. Yesudas	Vayalar Ramavarma	
4	"Kaalam Kankeli Pushpangal"	K. J. Yesudas, P. Susheela, P. Jayachandran	Vayalar Ramavarma	
5	"Kaithappazham"	P. Madhuri	Vayalar Ramavarma	
6	"Pandoru Naalee"	K. J. Yesudas, P. Madhuri, C. O. Anto	Vayalar Ramavarma	
7	"Vey Raaja Vey"		Vayalar Ramavarma	
