= Durga (1974 film) =

- Directed by: Kunchacko
- Written by: N. Govindankutty
- Screenplay by: N. Govindankutty
- Produced by: M. Kunchacko
- Starring: Prem Nazir; Adoor Bhasi; Manavalan Joseph; Rajasree; Boban Kunchacko
- Cinematography: N. A. Thara
- Edited by: T. R. Sekhar
- Music by: G. Devarajan
- Production company: Udaya
- Distributed by: Udaya
- Release date: 5 April 1974
- Country: India
- Language: Malayalam

Durga is a 1974 Indian Malayalam-language film directed and produced by Kunchacko. The film stars Prem Nazir, Adoor Bhasi, Manavalan Joseph and the director's son Boban Kunchacko in the lead roles. The film has musical score by G. Devarajan.

== Cast ==
- Prem Nazir as Professor Damadharan, Ramu (double role)
- Adoor Bhasi as Johny
- Manavalan Joseph as Aali
- Boban Kunchacko as Mukunthan
- Adoor Pankajam as Yashoda
- G. K. Pillai as Swami
- Rajasree as Latha
- K. P. Ummer as Kunjikannan
- N. Govindankutty as Kattumalayan
- Rajakokila as Kanthi
- S. P. Pillai as Ambu
- Sumithra as Vasanthy
- Ushakumari as Radha
- Vijayanirmala as Thulasi
- Vincent as Mohan
- Kaduvakulam Antony as Mammad

== Soundtrack ==
The music was composed by G. Devarajan and the lyrics were written by Vayalar Ramavarma.

| No. | Song | Singers | Lyrics | Length (m:ss) |
|---|---|---|---|---|
| 1 | "Amme Maalikappurathamme" | L. R. Eeswari, P. B. Sreenivas, Chorus | Vayalar Ramavarma | |
| 2 | "Chalo Chalo" | K. J. Yesudas, P. Madhuri, Chorus | Vayalar Ramavarma | |
| 3 | "Gurudevaa" | K. J. Yesudas, P. Madhuri, Chorus | Vayalar Ramavarma | |
| 4 | "Kaattodum Malayoram" | K. J. Yesudas, P. Susheela | Vayalar Ramavarma | |
| 5 | "Manmadhamaanasa Pushpangale" (Sweet Dreams) | K. J. Yesudas, Chorus | Vayalar Ramavarma | |
| 6 | "Sahyante Hridayam" | K. J. Yesudas | Vayalar Ramavarma | |
| 7 | "Sanchaari Swapnasanchaari" | P. Susheela | Vayalar Ramavarma | |
| 8 | "Shabarimalayude" | P. Susheela | Vayalar Ramavarma | |
