= Theeram Thedunna Thira =

- Directed by: A. Vincent
- Written by: P. K. Sarangapani
- Screenplay by: P. K. Sarangapani
- Produced by: Boban Kunchacko
- Starring: Prem Nazir; Ambika; Mammootty; Ratheesh; Raveendran
- Cinematography: Jayanan Vincent
- Edited by: T. R. Sekhar
- Music by: Shyam
- Production company: Excel Productions
- Distributed by: Excel Productions
- Release date: 4 February 1983
- Country: India
- Language: Malayalam

Theeram Thedunna Thira (transl. The wave searching for the shore) is a 1983 Indian Malayalam-language film directed by A. Vincent and produced by Boban Kunchacko. The film stars Prem Nazir, Ambika, Mammootty, Ratheesh and Raveendran. The film has musical score by Shyam.

== Cast ==
- Prem Nazir as Sudhakaran
- Ambika as Jayalakshmi
- Mammootty as Madhu
- Ratheesh as Jayadevan
- KPAC Lalitha as Madhavi
- Raveendran as Suresh
- Silk Smitha as Smitha
- Sukumari as Jayalakshmi's mother
- T. G. Ravi as Balakrishnan
- P. K. Abraham as Govidan master
- Jagathy Sreekumar as Thampi
- Prathapachandran as Justice Prabhakaran
- Santhakumari as Sudhakaran's mother
- Mala Aravindan as Sekhara Pilla
- Alummoodan as Kumaran
- Nithya Ravindran as Nurse
- Jayasree Krishna as Usha

== Soundtrack ==
The music was composed by Shyam and the lyrics were written by Kozhissery Balaraman and P. Bhaskaran.

No.	Song	Singers	Lyrics	Length (m:ss)
1	"Jeevitham Oru Mareechika"	K. J. Yesudas	Kozhissery Balaraman	
2	"Kandu Kandilla"	Ambili, Jency	Kozhissery Balaraman	
3	"Kanninte Karppooram"	S. Janaki	Kozhissery Balaraman	
4	"Kanninte Karppooram Karalinu Sayoojyam"	K. J. Yesudas	Kozhissery Balaraman	
5	"Nee Varille"	S. Janaki	Kozhissery Balaraman	
6	"Sundaramaam Kanmunayal"	S. Janaki	P. Bhaskaran	
7	"Swarna Theril"	K. J. Yesudas, Ambili	Kozhissery Balaraman	
8	"Theeram Thedi Thira Vannu"	K. J. Yesudas	Kozhissery Balaraman	
