= Karan (actor) =

Indian actor

- Born: 19 August 1967 (age 59); Erode, Tamil Nadu, India
- Other names: Shashi Karan, Master Raghu
- Occupation: Actor
- Years active: 1972–2016

Karan (born 19 August 1967) is an Indian former actor who appeared predominantly in Tamil and Malayalam films. He started his career as a child actor (under the stage name Master Raghu). In the 1990s he started to act in leading and villain roles. In the mid-2000s, after a sabbatical, Karan chose to prioritise appearing in films where he would portray the lead role following the relative success of Kokki (2006).

== Career ==
Karan started his career as a child artist, appearing under the name Master Raghu in more than 70 films in Malayalam and Tamil. In 1992, he made his Tamil debut as an adult in an uncredited role in the Rajinikanth-starrer Annaamalai, before making a breakthrough with his performance as a rogue college student in Nammavar (1994) alongside Kamal Haasan.

In 2004, Karan became a solo hero with the Malayalam film Isra. He has continued with films like Kokki (2006), Karuppusamy Kuththagaithaarar (2007) and Kathavarayan (2008). His recent films are Kantha (2013), Sooran (2014), and Uchathula Shiva (2016).

In 2018, a clip from his film Coimbatore Mappillai went viral online, prompting internet users to associate the word "Shroov" with the actor.

== Other work ==
Karan made his advertisement debut in a 45-second Mahindra Duro advertisement with Bollywood actress Kareena Kapoor.

== Personal life ==
Karan's father died in 2014, aged 90.

== Awards ==
Kerala State Film Awards

- 1974 – Best Child Artist – Rajahamsam
- 1975 – Best Child Artist – Prayanam, Swami Ayyappan

Tamil Nadu State Film Awards

- 2009 -Tamil Nadu State Film Award for Best Actor – Malayan

== Filmography ==
=== As child artist ===
- Note: Credited as Master Raghu. All films are in Malayalam, unless otherwise noted.

Year	Title	Role	Notes
1972	Achanum Bappayum	Young Devadas	
1972	Pulliman		
1972	Punarjanmam	Young Aravindan	
1973	Thekkan Kattu	Joy	
1974	Rajahamsam	Rajan	Kerala State Film Award for Best Child Artist
1975	Prayanam	Appu	Kerala State Film Award for Best Child Artist
1975	Kannappanunni	Ambu	
1975	Swami Ayyappan	Manikandan	Kerala State Film Award for Best Child Artist
1975	Babumon	Babu	
1975	Mattoru Seetha		
1975	Manishada	Young Kareem	
1975	Pravaham	Chandru	
1975	Ayodhya	Gopi	
1975	Kalyaanappanthal		
1975	Chattambikkalyaani	Young Vaasu	
1975	Ashtamirohini		
1975	Enga Pattan Sothu	Murugan	Tamil Film
1976	Panchami	Chinnan	
1976	Themmadi Velappan	Young Velappan	
1976	Ammini Ammaavan		
1976	Agnipushpam		
1976	Mallanum Mathevanum		
1976	Chennaaya Valarthiya Kutty		
1976	Aayiram Janmangal	Young Rajan	
1977	Sreemurukan		
1977	Sridevi		
1977	Aparaadhi	Raju	
1977	Anugraham	Young Rajan	
1977	Murugan Adimai	Saravana	
1977	Achaaram Ammini Osharam Omana	Raghu	
1977	Jagadguru Aadisankaran	Young Aadisankaran	
1977	Tholkan Enikku Manassilla		
1977	Oonjaal	Rajan	
1977	Vezhambal		
1978	Velluvili	Pappan	
1978	Raghuvamsham		
1978	Kudumbam Namukku Sreekovil	Reghu	
1978	Avalude Ravukal	Sudhakaran	
1979	Choola		
1979	Puthiya Velicham	Kochu Govindan	
1980	Avan Oru Ahankaari		
1980	Chandrahasam		
1980	Theenalangal	Ramu	

=== As actor ===
==== Films ====
Year	Film	Role	Language	Notes
1982	Ina	Vinod	Malayalam	credited as Raghu, first lead role
1983	Kuyiline Thedi	Shyam	Malayalam	credited as Raghu
1985	Idanilangal		Malayalam	Uncredited
1987	January Oru Orma	Appu	Malayalam	credited as Raghu
1990	Chuvanna Kannukal		Malayalam	credited as Raghu
1990	Keli Kottu		Malayalam	credited as Raghu
1990	Mridula	Anirudh	Malayalam	credited as Raghu
1991	Neelagiri		Malayalam	credited as Raghu
1991	Mahassar	Suresh	Malayalam	credited as Raghu
1991	Theechatti Govindhan	Henchman (uncredited role)	Tamil	
1992	Annaamalai	Deepak, Ashok's son	Tamil	
1992	Apaaratha	Hari	Malayalam	
1994	Nammavar	Ramesh	Tamil	First film credited as Karan
1995	Thottil Kuzhandhai	Murali	Tamil	
1995	Chandralekha	Jamal	Tamil	
1996	Coimbatore Mappillai	Mahesh	Tamil	
1996	Vaikarai Pookkal	Shankar	Tamil	
1996	Kadhal Kottai	Siva	Tamil	
1996	Gokulathil Seethai	Mohan	Tamil	
1997	Kaalamellam Kaathiruppen	Raja	Tamil	
1997	Kaalamellam Kadhal Vaazhga	Prakash	Tamil	
1997	Love Today	Peter	Tamil	
1997	Kaadhali		Tamil	
1997	Raman Abdullah	Abdullah	Tamil	
1997	Nerukku Ner	Muthukumaraswamy	Tamil	
1997	Kaduva Thomas		Malayalam	
1998	Suswagatham	Peter	Telugu	
1998	Ponmanam	Kumar	Tamil	
1998	Kangalin Vaarthaigal		Tamil	
1998	Kaadhal Mannan	Ranjan	Tamil	
1998	Color Kanavugal	Bharani	Tamil	
1998	Thulli Thirintha Kalam	Raghu	Tamil	
1998	Sollamale	Vikram	Tamil	
1998	Kannedhirey Thondrinal	Shankar	Tamil	
1998	Kannathal	Chinna Durai	Tamil	
1998	Kaadhal Kavidhai		Tamil	
1999	Unnaithedi	Prakash	Tamil	
1999	Ullathai Killathe	Col. Major Prakash	Tamil	
1999	Poovellam Kettuppar	Director	Tamil	
1999	Sneha	Vijay	Kannada	
1999	Minsara Kanna	Ashok	Tamil	
1999	Maravathe Kanmaniye	Marudhu	Tamil	
1999	Kannupada Poguthaiya	Subramaniyam	Tamil	
1999	Manam Virumbuthe Unnai	Chandru	Tamil	
2000	Thirunelveli	Varadappan	Tamil	
2000	Rajakali Amman	Seemadorai / Kannayiram	Tamil	
2000	Vallarasu	Seshadri	Tamil	
2000	Koodi Vazhnthal Kodi Nanmai	Sivaraman	Tamil	
2000	Ilayavan		Tamil	
2000	Budget Padmanabhan	Abishek	Tamil	
2001	Nageswari	Easwar	Tamil	
2001	Engalukkum Kaalam Varum	Ramesh	Tamil	
2001	Paarvai Ondre Pothume	Manoj	Tamil	
2001	Sonnal Thaan Kathala	Inspector Inbaraj	Tamil	
2001	Kunguma Pottu Gounder	Siva	Tamil	
2001	Kabadi Kabadi	Sivaprakash	Tamil	
2001	Hoo Anthiya Uhoo Anthiya	Karan	Kannada	
2001	Kottai Mariamman	Eashwar	Tamil	
2002	Alli Arjuna	Kishore	Tamil	
2002	Sri Bannari Amman	Vaanamaalai	Tamil	
2003	Nee Varum Paathaiyellam		Tamil	
2004	Arasatchi	Prakash	Tamil	
2004	Isra	Mukthi Muhammed Isra/Aravindan	Malayalam	Dubbed and released in Tamil as Kombu
2006	Kokki	Kokki	Tamil	
2007	Karuppusamy Kuththagaithaarar	Karuppusamy	Tamil	
2007	Thee Nagar	Murugan	Tamil	
2008	Kathavarayan	Kathavarayan	Tamil	
2009	Malayan	Malayan	Tamil	Tamil Nadu State Film Award for Best Actor
2010	Kanagavel Kaaka	Kanagavel	Tamil	
2010	Irandu Mugam	Parthasarathy	Tamil	
2011	Thambi Vettothi Sundaram	Sundaram	Tamil	
2013	Kantha	Kantha	Tamil	
2014	Sooran	Sooran	Tamil	
2016	Uchathula Shiva	Shiva	Tamil	

==== Television ====
Year	serials	Role	Language	Notes
1995	Balachander in Chinnathirai - Mutham		Tamil	
1995	Balachander in Chinnathirai - Oppanai		Tamil	
