= Aazhi =

1985 film directed by Boban Kunchacko

- Directed by: Boban Kunchacko
- Written by: E. Mosus
- Produced by: Boban Kunchacko
- Starring: Thilakan; Captain Raju; Baby Shalini; Chithra
- Cinematography: U. Rajagopal
- Edited by: S. P. S. Veerappan
- Music by: Raj Kamal
- Production company: Excel Productions
- Distributed by: Excel Release
- Release date: 15 February 1985
- Country: India
- Language: Malayalam

Aazhi (transl. Sea) is a 1985 Indian Malayalam-language film directed and produced by Boban Kunchacko and written by E. Mosus. The film stars Thilakan, Captain Raju, Baby Shalini and Chithra in the lead roles. The film has musical score by Raj Kamal.

== Cast ==
- Thilakan
- Captain Raju
- Baby Shalini
- Chithra
- G. K. Pillai
- K. R. Vijaya
- Kaduvakulam Antony
- Kalpana Ayyer
- M. G. Soman
- Ramu
- Shanavas
- Raveendran

== Soundtrack ==
The music was composed by Raj Kamal and the lyrics were written by Bichu Thirumala.

No.	Song	Singers	Lyrics	Length (m:ss)
1	"Akale Polum"	K. J. Yesudas	Bichu Thirumala	
2	"Alliyilam Poo"	K. J. Yesudas, S. Janaki	Bichu Thirumala	
3	"Ezhu Paalam Kadannu"	S. Janaki, K. P. Brahmanandan	Bichu Thirumala	
4	"Hayya Manassoru Shayya"	Vani Jairam	Bichu Thirumala	
5	"Kalyaanimulle"	P. Susheela	Bichu Thirumala	
6	"Manuja Janmam"	K. J. Yesudas	Bichu Thirumala	
7	"Ulakudayon"	Chorus, C. O. Anto, Thomas Williams	Bichu Thirumala	
