= Palattu Koman =

1962 Indian film

- Directed by: Kunchacko
- Written by: P. K. Sarangapani (dialogues)
- Based on: Komappan (1912) by Kundoor Narayana Menon
- Produced by: Kunchacko
- Starring: Sathyan; Ragini; Sree Ramani
- Cinematography: T. N. Krishnankutty Nair
- Edited by: S. Williams
- Music by: M. S. Baburaj (songs); G. Ramanathan (score)
- Production company: Excel Productions
- Distributed by: Excel Productions
- Release date: 2 September 1962
- Country: India
- Language: Malayalam

Palattu Koman is a 1962 Indian Malayalam-language swashbuckler film directed and produced by Kunchacko. Based on Komappan, a 1912 poem by Kundoor Narayana Menon, the film tells the story of Palattu Koman, a folk hero and skilled kalaripayattu warrior from the ballads of North Malabar. The film was produced by Udaya Studios through their company, Excel Productions. It stars Sathyan, Ragini, and Sree Ramani. The film's songs were composed by M. S. Baburaj.

The plot unfolds around a longstanding feud between two families: Konkiyamma's Kaippulli Pālāttu Tharavadu and Chandrappan's Thonnooram Veedu. The film was a box office success.

== Plot ==
In northern Malabar, a longstanding feud rages between two families, Thonnooram Veedu and Kaippulli Pālāttu Tharavadu. Chandrappan, the head of Thonnoorām Veedu, plans to seize a treasure hidden in the underground chambers of the Pālāttu mansion. A conflict between the younger members of both families escalates into a violent clash, during which Chandrappan murders the husband and nine children of Konkiyamma from the Pālāttu family.

Konkiyamma, initially taken to the jungle to be killed, is rescued by a local chieftain. She later gives birth to a son and vows to annihilate the Thonnooram Veedu family. Disguised, she returns to Pālāttu with her loyal aide Pankan and, with the help of the snakes guarding the treasure, successfully escapes with the wealth. Konkiyamma's son, Koman, undergoes rigorous training in martial arts and becomes a master. Determined to fulfill his mother's vow, Koman embarks on a mission to eliminate the Thonnooram Veedu clan.

Koman falls in love with Unniyamma, unaware that she is Chandrappan's sister. Meanwhile, Chandrappan captures and tortures Konkiyamma. Koman ultimately defeats Chandrappan and rescues his mother. The film concludes with the death of all members of Thonnooram Veedu, except Unniyamma, whom Koman marries, bringing the story to a harmonious conclusion.

== Cast ==
- Sathyan as Palattu Koman
- Ragini as Unniyamma
- Sree Ramani as Konkiyamma
- Kottayam Chellappan as Chandrappan
- Jayanthi as Unnicheeru
- Velayudhan Nair as Naaduvazhi
- Sunny as Cheenkappan
- S. J. Dev as Kollan
- K. S. Gopinath as Ramappan
- Kundara Bhasi as Idimaadan
- Manavalan Joseph as Astrologer
- Ochira Sankarankutty as Kaipalleelachan
- Kanchana as Ittaatti
- S. P. Pillai as Pankan
- Bahadoor as Cheengan
- Baby Savithri as Unnicheeru Jr.
- Baby Seetha as Unniyamma Jr.
- Jijo Punnoose as Kunjukoman
- Boban Kunchacko as Kochukoman

== Production ==
Following the success of Unniyarcha (1961), a ballad-based film from the Vadakkan Pattukal, Udaya Studios chose another ballad for adaptation, focusing on Palattu Koman, a prominent kalaripayattu practitioner from the same folklore. The screenplay by P. K. Sarangapani was based on the 1912 poem Komappan by Kundoor Narayana Menon, which popularized the tale of Palattu Koman and his love affair with his rival's sister. Principal photography took place at Udaya Studios, as well as the backwaters of Kerala. Originally, the producers intended to title the film Konki Amma or Kunki Amma, as evidenced by gramophone records that still carry the title Konki Amma. In the film, Kunchacko introduced Rushyendramani, an actress from Telugu cinema, who played a principal role. For the film's credits, Kunchacko changed her name to Sree Ramani. It is also the only Malayalam film she acted.

== Soundtrack ==
The music was composed by M. S. Baburaj, with lyrics by Vayalar Ramavarma and P. K. Sarangapani. B. Vijayakumar of The Hindu called "Chandana Pallakkil" as "one of the best romantic songs in the language". Other best known songs include "Poove Nalla Poove", "Ayyappan Kaavilamme", and "Manassinakkathoru Pennu".

No.	Song	Singers	Lyrics	Length (m:ss)
1	"Aanakeramalayilu"	Jikki, K. P. Udayabhanu, K. S. George	Vayalar Ramavarma	
2	"Aanakkaara"	K. J. Yesudas, P. Susheela	P. K. Sarangapani	
3	"Ayyappan Kaavilamme"	P. Leela	Vayalar Ramavarma	
4	"Bhaagyamulla Thampuraane"	Jikki, K. S. George	Vayalar Ramavarma	
5	"Chaanchakkam"	Chorus, Jikki	Vayalar Ramavarma	
6	"Chandanappallakkil"	P. Susheela, A. M. Rajah	Vayalar Ramavarma	
7	"Kanneeru Kondoru"	P. Leela	Vayalar Ramavarma	
8	"Maane Maane"	Santha P. Nair	Vayalar Ramavarma	
9	"Manassinakathoru Pennu"	K.P. Udayabhanu	Vayalar Ramavarma	
10	"Ooruka Padavaal"	P. B. Sreenivas	Vayalar Ramavarma	
11	"Poove Nalla Poove"	P. Leela, Jikki, Santha P. Nair	Vayalar Ramavarma	
12	"Urukukayaanoru Hridayam"	P. Susheela	Vayalar Ramavarma	

== Reception ==
Palattu Koman was a commercial success at the box office. In a 2009 retrospective analysis, B. Vijayakumar of The Hindu wrote that "besides sword fighting that was mandatory in these tales, the film included fights between man and wild animals. In fact, the hero's fight with a tiger was a highpoint of the film. These scenes were canned impressively using the available equipment and techniques of the time". he also praised the music, cinematography, costumes, dialogues, and acting.
