= Aromalunni =

1972 film by Kunchacko

- Directed by: Kunchacko
- Written by: P. K. Sarangapani
- Screenplay by: P. K. Sarangapani
- Produced by: M. Kunchacko
- Starring: Prem Nazir; Ravichandran; Vijayasree; Sheela
- Cinematography: U. Rajagopal
- Edited by: Veerappan
- Music by: G. Devarajan
- Production company: Excel Productions
- Distributed by: Excel Productions
- Release date: 14 April 1972
- Country: India
- Language: Malayalam

Aromalunni ആരോമലുണ്ണി is a 1972 Indian Malayalam-language film directed and produced by Kunchacko, based on Vadakkan Pattukal, a collection of Northern Ballads of medieval origin. The film stars Prem Nazir, Vijayasree, Ravichandran and Sheela in the lead roles. The film has musical score by G. Devarajan and it is a sequel to Kunchacko's 1961 film Unniyarcha. The film was a commercial success.

== Cast ==
- Prem Nazir as Aromalunni/Kunjiraman
- Ravichandran as Kannappanunni/Chandrappan
- Vijayasree as Kanni
- Sheela as Maakkam
- K. P. Ummer as Thampikkutti
- Ragini as Unniyarcha
- Kaviyoor Ponnamma as Thumbolarcha
- Sathyan as Aromalchekavar (Archive Footage)
- Thikkurissy Sukumaran Nair as Puthooram Veettil Kannappa Chekavar
- N. Govindan Kutty as Ammavan
- Manavalan Joseph as Unikkoran
- Adoor Pankajam
- Alummoodan
- G. K. Pillai as Kolathunadu Raja
- Kaduvakulam Antony
- Paravoor Bharathan as Thirumeni
- S. P. Pillai as Paanan

== Soundtrack ==
The music was composed by G. Devarajan and the lyrics were written by Vayalar Ramavarma.

No.	Song	Singers	Lyrics	Length (m:ss)
1	Aadikkalikkeda Kochuraama	Raveendran	Vayalar Ramavarma	
2	Marimaanmizhi	P. Madhuri, Chorus	Vayalar Ramavarma	
3	Mullapoothu Mulavirinju	K. J. Yesudas, P. Susheela	Vayalar Ramavarma	
4	Muthumanippalunku Vellam	K. J. Yesudas	Vayalar Ramavarma	
5	Paadaam Paadaam	K. J. Yesudas, P. Jayachandran	Vayalar Ramavarma	
6	Puthooram Veettil (F)	P. Susheela	Vayalar Ramavarma	
7	Puthooram Veettil (M)	K. J. Yesudas	Vayalar Ramavarma	
8	Kanna Aromalunni Kanna	K. J. Yesudas, P. Susheela	Vayalar Ramavarma	
9	Udayagiri Kottayile	P. Susheela	Vayalar Ramavarma	
