= Pearl View =

- Directed by: Kunchacko
- Written by: Ponkunnam Varkey
- Produced by: M. Kunchacko
- Starring: Prem Nazir; Sharada; Adoor Bhasi; Manavalan Joseph
- Cinematography: P. Dathu
- Edited by: Krishnan
- Music by: G. Devarajan
- Production company: Excel Productions
- Release date: 18 December 1970
- Country: India
- Language: Malayalam

Pearl View is a 1970 Indian Malayalam-language film, directed by Kunchacko. The film stars Prem Nazir, Sharada, Adoor Bhasi and Manavalan Joseph. It was released on 18 December 1970.

== Plot ==
The story pivots around two Christian families settled in the coastal area of the State. Xavier and his wife Prastheena have a son, Lawrence. The family, headed by Marian, consists of his wife Annie, daughter Stella and Bastian.

The two families, whose occupation is fishing, are ideal neighbours who support each other. A ‘bad boy’ in school, Bastian is sent to his uncle in Colombo and he grows up there. Cholera spreads in the coastal area and Marian's family is hit by the disease. The municipal authorities set their house and belongings on fire as a precautionary step to check the spread of the disease. Xavier spends all his savings to build a new house for Marian. Lawrence and Stella fall in love and their parents decide to conduct their marriage.

Xavier and Marian get hold of a box full of gold bars which was dumped in the sea by smugglers when pursued by the police. They bury the box on the beach fearing the police and plan to utilise this wealth for their benefit later. Bastian returns from Colombo. He learns of the buried gold and secretly takes possession of it by influencing Marian. Xavier finds he is cheated.

Marian buys ‘Pearl View,’ a huge mansion. Bastian protests against Stella's marriage to Lawrence. He takes advantage of Stella's passion for music and takes her to Bombay to enrol her at the Bombay Music Academy. He misleads Stella by forcing to her to sign marriage documents instead of the music academy admission documents. He manages to get Stella married to Prof. Stephen at the academy.

At this juncture Lawrence reaches Bombay accompanying a drama troupe. He learns of Stella's marriage and returns home disappointed.

Stella learns of the 'trap' on the first night of her marriage. Stephen, also unaware of the trap set by Bastian, sends Stella back home. Stella reveals the whole story to Lawrence, who accepts her and allows her to stay with his family. Bastian tries to separate Stella from Lawrence. Now it is time for everyone to forget and forgive. Everyone becomes aware of Bastian's wicked deeds. Xavier and Marian reunite; Lawrence and Stella get married.

== Cast ==
- Prem Nazir as Lawrence
- Sharada as Stella
- Adoor Bhasi as Henry
- Manavalan Joseph as Member of Drama Troupe/Manavalan
- P. J. Antony as Xavier
- Adoor Bhavani as Annie
- Adoor Pankajam as Rathi Madhavan/Fashion Designer
- Alummoodan as Member of Drama Troupe
- Aranmula Ponnamma as Pristina
- K. P. Ummer as Professor Stephen
- Kaduvakulam Antony as Housekeeper
- Kottarakkara Sreedharan Nair as Marian
- Kottayam Chellappan
- Madhumathi
- N. Govindankutty as Bastian
- S. J. Dev
- S. P. Pillai as Boss

== Soundtrack ==
The music was composed by G. Devarajan with lyrics by Vayalar Ramavarma.

Song	Singers
"Kaithappoo Vishariyumaay"	K. J. Yesudas, P. Madhuri
"Pushpa Vimaanavum"	B. Vasantha, Chorus, Malathi
"Thankathaazhika"	K. J. Yesudas
"Vishudhanaaya"	K. J. Yesudas, B. Vasantha, Chorus
"Yavanasundari"	K. J. Yesudas, B. Vasantha
