= P. K. Sarangapani =

Malayalam screenwriter and playwright (1925–2011)

P.K. Sarangapani
- Born: 28 July 1925; Alappuzha, Kerala, India
- Died: 2 February 2011 (aged 85); Cherthala, Alappuzha, Kerala, India
- Occupations: Screenwriter; playwright
- Years active: 1960–1990

P. K. Sarangapani (28 July 1925 – 2 February 2011) was a Malayalam screenwriter and playwright. He wrote the screenplay and dialogues for 36 films, most of them for Kunchacko's Udaya Studios. Most of his films are Vadakkanpattu-related period dramas.

== Early life ==
Sarangapani was born on 28 July 1925 in Alappuzha, Kerala.

== Career ==
He joined the Udaya Studios, founded by Kunchacko, in 1960 and scripted majority of their notable works during the 1960s and 1970s. His debut work Umma, based on a novel by Moidu Padiyath, was the first Muslim social film in Malayalam.

His last work, Kadathanadan Ambadi, was released in 1990, after which he retired.

== Death ==
Sarangapani who was suffering from a prolonged illness died on 2 February 2011 at a private hospital in Cherthala.

== Selected works ==
=== Films ===
- Umma (1960)
- Neeli Sali (1960)
- Unniyarcha (1961)
- Palattu Koman (1962)
- Othenante Makan (1970)
- Postmane Kananilla (1972)
- Aromalunni (1972)
- Pavangal Pennungal (1973)
- Thumbolarcha (1974)
- Manishada (1975)
- Neela Ponman (1975)
- Cheenavala (1975)
- Mallanum Mathevanum (1976)
- Kannappanunni (1977)
- Kadathanattu Makkam (1977)
- Acharam Ammini Osaram Omana (1977)
- Palattu Kunjikannan (1980)
- Kadathanadan Ambadi (1990)
- Aromal Chekavar
- Thaara

=== Plays ===
- Ballatha Duniyavu
- Chilamboli
- Bhavana
- Avarente Makkal
