= Omana Kunjamma =

Indian jurist

- Born: Kingdom of Travancore
- Parent(s): Mangat C. Govinda Pillai (father); N. Lekshmi Amma (mother)

Omana Kunjamma was India's first female magistrate.

Kunjamma was born in the village of Thikkurissy, Nagercoil, Kanyakumari (then a part of Kerala's Travancore Kingdom), in an aristocratic Malayalee Nair family, to Mangat C. Govinda Pillai and N. Lekshmi Amma. She was the elder sister of the noted Malayalam actor and writer Thikkurissy Sukumaran Nair.
