= Cheenavala =

1975 film

- Directed by: Kunchacko
- Screenplay by: Sarangapani
- Produced by: Kunchacko
- Starring: Prem Nazir; Jayabharathi; K. P. A. C. Lalitha; Adoor Bhasi
- Cinematography: Balu Mahendra
- Edited by: T. R. Sekhar
- Music by: M. K. Arjunan
- Production company: Udaya
- Distributed by: Udaya
- Release date: 24 December 1975
- Country: India
- Language: Malayalam

Cheenavala (transl. Fishing net) is a 1975 Indian Malayalam-language film, produced and directed by Kunchacko. The film stars Prem Nazir, Jayabharathi, K. P. A. C. Lalitha and Adoor Bhasi. The film has musical score and songs composed by M. K. Arjunan.

== Cast ==
- Prem Nazir as Pushkaran
- Jayabharathi as Pennaal
- K. P. A. C. Lalitha as Maanikki
- Adoor Bhasi as Pappu
- Thikkurissy Sukumaran Nair as Richman Rana
- Pattom Sadan as Mohan
- Sankaradi as Konthi
- Adoor Pankajam as Karthyayani
- Meena as Paaru
- Janardanan as Rowdi Paachan
- K. P. Ummer as Prathapachandran
- Kunchan as Madhu
- Kuthiravattam Pappu as Fernandes
- Nellikode Bhaskaran as Ayyappan
- Arur Sathyan
- Sathi as sheela
- T. S. Radhamani

== Soundtrack ==
All lyrics are written by Vayalar Ramavarma, this is one of his last works.; all music is composed by M. K. Arjunan.

Track listing
No.	Title	Artist(s)	Length
1.	"Azhimukhathu"	K. J. Yesudas
2.	"Kanyaadaanam"	K. J. Yesudas, B. Vasantha
3.	"Poonthurayil" (Pathos)	Ambili
4.	"Poonthurayilarayante"	P. Susheela
5.	"Thalirvalayo"	K. J. Yesudas
