= Kantha (film) =

2013 Indian film by Babu Viswanath

- Theatrical release poster
- Directed by: Babu Vishwanath
- Produced by: Kalpana Pazhanivel
- Starring: Karan; Vivek; Mithra Kurian
- Cinematography: Sivakumar
- Edited by: Suresh Urs
- Music by: Shakthi R. Selva
- Production company: VP Films
- Release date: 22 March 2013
- Country: India
- Language: Tamil

Kantha is a 2013 Indian Tamil-language action film directed by Babu Viswanath. It stars Karan, Vivek and Mithra Kurian in the lead roles. The film was released after a five-year delay, in March 2013.

== Cast ==
- Karan as Kantha
- Vivek as Thangamagan / 'Kunju' Mani
- Mithra Kurian
- Rajesh as Varadharajan
- Niyamath Khan as Bose
- Riyaz Khan as Jaffar
- Sathyan as Tamil
- Aarthi
- Kadhal Dhandapani
- Cell Murugan as 'Needhi' Nayagam
- Scissor Manohar
- Crane Manohar
- Boys Rajan
- A. C. Murali Mohan
- Kili Ramachandran
- Visweswara Rao as college principal
- Munishkanth as henchman
- Natesan

== Production ==
Viswanath, who had earlier worked as an assistant to director Saran in the films Jay Jay, Attagasam and Vasool Raja MBBS, announced that he would make a film featuring actor Karan and Shakti R. Selva, a keyboard player with A. R. Rahman, made his debut as a music director through the film. Filming began in February 2008 and the team initially announced a release in October 2008, but this was not met. The film was entirely shot in Thanjavur, with scenes shot at the bus stand and at SB Nagar Grounds.

== Soundtrack ==
The soundtrack of the film was composed by Shakthi R. Selva.

Track listing
No.	Title	Singer(s)	Length
1.	"Uyar Thiru Kadhal"	Haricharan, Mahathi	4:38
2.	"Sathuryam Pesathada"	Suchitra, Shakti R. Selva	5:09
3.	"Pathu Lorry"	Malathi, Mukesh	4:36
4.	"Mutham Kaikum"	Ranjith, Megha	4:00
5.	"Etturu Tarikaa"	Benny Dayal	4:30
6.	"Aram Konduru"	Shakti R. Selva, Prasanna	2:26
Total length:			25:19

== Release ==
In March 2012, a City Civil Court suspended the release of the film after a dispute arose of money transaction between the producer and a financier. Petitioner Mohan Kumar, the financier had lent Rs. 25 lakh to assist the producer, Pazhanivel, in the production of the film with a promise that the money should be paid within the stipulated time mentioned in the agreement. But, the producers did not pay the amount in cash instead they produced two cheque leaves to the financier that bounced at the bank for lack of funds in the account. As Mohan Kumar could not get the amount from the producers, he approached the court to stop the film release until the producers pay him the amount. The film faced further troubles when actor Karan complained of non-payment of his salary and when Babu Vishwanath walked out of the film to direct another venture titled Theradi Veethi. The film was later released in March 2013 on a small scale, almost five years after production had begun.

== Critical reception ==
A critic from Dinamalar wrote that half of the film is attitude and asked the audience what the other half of the film is. A critic from Kumudam called the film okay. Kungumam wrote that the director has chosen Thanjavur as the setting for the story. The critic added Karan fits the role of a hot-tempered young man, and the love between him and Mithra is full of excitement, adding that if this same flavor had been sprinkled throughout the film, Kantha would have been even more impressive."
