= Kannappanunni =

- Directed by: Kunchako
- Written by: Sarangapani
- Screenplay by: Sarangapani
- Produced by: Kunchako
- Starring: Prem Nazir; Sheela; Sukumari; Jayabharathi
- Cinematography: U. Rajagopal
- Edited by: T. R. Sekhar
- Music by: K. Raghavan
- Production company: Excel Productions
- Distributed by: Excel Productions
- Release date: 7 April 1977
- Country: India
- Language: Malayalam

Kannappanunni is a 1977 Indian Malayalam-language film based on Kalaripayattu, the traditional martial art of India. It was the 100th film featuring Prem Nazir and Sheela as the leading pair. It was Udaya Studio's 75th film. The film was directed and produced by Kunchako. The film stars Prem Nazir, Sheela, Sukumari and Jayabharathi. The film has musical score and songs by K. Raghavan.

== Cast ==
- Prem Nazir
- Sheela
- Jayabharathi
- K. P. Ummer
- Adoor Bhasi
- Vijayalalitha
- Jayan
- Sukumari
- G. K. Pillai
- Thikkurissy Sukumaran Nair
- Janardanan
- N. Govindankutty
- Unni Mary
- Meena
- Sreelatha
- Master Raghu
- Adoor Pankajam
- Pankajavalli
- P. K. Abraham
- Premji
- Abbas
- Santo Krishnan
- Kaduvakulam Antony
- Sathyan
- Gundumani
- Sulochana

== Plot ==
The royal family is looking for groom for their young princess (Sheela) but she is married to lower class woodcutter (Nazir) due to circumstances. She educate him to be a prince. But the couple have fallout and woodcutter is prisoned.At this same time his look alike visits the kingdom and he learns about the situation and tries to help the woodcutter.

== Soundtrack ==
The music was composed by K. Raghavan.

No.	Song	Singers	Lyrics	Length (m:ss)
1	"Aayiram Phanamezhum"	K. J. Yesudas	P. Bhaskaran	
2	"Allimalarkaavile"	K. J. Yesudas	P. Bhaskaran	
3	"Ithiri Mullappoo Mottalla"	S. Janaki, Chorus	P. Bhaskaran	
4	"Kaarthika Naalallo"	L. R. Eeswari, Chorus	P. Bhaskaran	
5	"Kanninu Pookkaniyam"	P. Susheela	P. Bhaskaran	
6	"Maanathe Mazhamukil"	P. Susheela	P. Bhaskaran	
7	"Mankamaare Mayakkunna"	P. Susheela, Vani Jairam	P. Bhaskaran	
8	"Mannil Ninnaval" (Bit)	K. J. Yesudas	P. Bhaskaran	
9	"Naagamanikkottayile" (Bit)	K. P. Brahmanandan	P. Bhaskaran	
10	"Neervanjikal Poothu"	B. Vasantha, Chorus	P. Bhaskaran	
11	"Panchavarnnakkilivaalan"	K. J. Yesudas, Vani Jairam	P. Bhaskaran	
12	"Ponnin Kattayanennalum"	K. J. Yesudas, P. Jayachandran	P. Bhaskaran	
13	"Vanavedan Ambeytha"	P. Susheela, B. Vasantha	P. Bhaskaran	
