= Saraswathi (film) =

- Directed by: Thikkurissy Sukumaran Nair
- Written by: Tagore; Thikkurissy Sukumaran Nair (dialogues)
- Screenplay by: Thikkurissy Sukumaran Nair
- Produced by: A. L. Sreenivasan
- Starring: Prem Nazir; Thikkurissy Sukumaran Nair; Muthukulam Raghavan Pillai; Ragini
- Cinematography: V. Selvaraj
- Edited by: V. P. Krishnan
- Music by: M. S. Baburaj
- Production company: ALS Productions
- Distributed by: ALS Productions
- Release date: 6 February 1970
- Country: India
- Language: Malayalam

Saraswathi is a 1970 Indian Malayalam-language film, directed by Thikkurissy Sukumaran Nair and produced by A. L. Sreenivasan. It stars Prem Nazir, Thikkurissy Sukumaran Nair, Muthukulam Raghavan Pillai and Ragini, and was scored by M. S. Baburaj.

== Cast ==
- Prem Nazir as Unni Kurup
- Thikkurissy Sukumaran Nair as Gokulam Govinda Kurup
- Muthukulam Raghavan Pillai as Raman Nair
- Vijayalalitha as Madanabala
- K. P. Ummer as Vikraman
- Meena as Meenakshi
- Ragini as Saraswathi
- Bahadoor as Chellappan
- T. S. Muthaiah as Panikker
- Adoor Bhasi as Nadanarangan
- Khadeeja as Neelambari Akkan

== Soundtrack ==
The music was composed by M. S. Baburaj and the lyrics were written by Thikkurissy Sukumaran Nair.

No.	Song	Singers	Lyrics	Length (m:ss)
1	"Aaru Paranju"	S. Janaki	Thikkurissy Sukumaran Nair	
2	"Ethra Thanne"	P. Leela	Thikkurissy Sukumaran Nair	
3	"Madhurappathinezhu"	L. R. Eeswari	Thikkurissy Sukumaran Nair	
4	"Marathakamanivarnna"	S. Janaki	Thikkurissy Sukumaran Nair	
5	"Neeyoru Raajaavu"	C. O. Anto, Zero Babu	Thikkurissy Sukumaran Nair	
6	"Om Harishree"	K. J. Yesudas	Thikkurissy Sukumaran Nair	
7	"Pennu Varunne"	L. R. Eeswari	Thikkurissy Sukumaran Nair	
