= Anarkali (1966 film) =

- Cover of the songbook of Anarkali
- Directed by: Kunchacko
- Written by: Vaikom Chandrasekharan Nair
- Produced by: Kunchacko
- Starring: Prem Nazir; K. R. Vijaya; Sathyan; Thikkurissy; Ambika Sukumaran; Rajasree; Kottarakkara Sreedharan Nair
- Edited by: S. P. S. Veerappan
- Music by: M. S. Baburaj
- Production company: Excel Productions
- Distributed by: Excel Productions
- Release date: 27 August 1966
- Country: India
- Language: Malayalam

Anarkali is a 1966 Malayalam-language romance film based on the historical love story between Prince Salim and Anarkali. Directed and produced by Kunchacko, the film was a direct adaptation of the 1953 Hindi film of the same name. The film stars Prem Nazir and K. R. Vijaya, with Sathyan, Thikkurissy, Ambika and Kottarakkara Sreedharan Nair playing other major roles.

== Cast ==
- Prem Nazir as Prince Salim
- K. R. Vijaya as Anarkali / Nadira
- Sathyan as Akbar
- Thikkurissy as Jaya Singhan
- Ambika Sukumaran as Jodhabai
- Kottarakkara Sreedharan Nair as Mana Singhan
- Rajasree (Gracy) as Gulnar
- Adoor Bhasi as Karim
- S. P. Pillai as Kasim
- Alummoodan (debut) as Afghani warrior
- Philomina as Anaarkkali's Mother
- Manavalan Joseph as Slave Trader
- K. J. Yesudas as Tansen
- L. P. R. Varma as Court Singer

The film's cast includes playback singer K. J. Yesudas and music director L. P. R. Varma playing small roles. Yesudas played Tansen, a pioneer in Indian music and one of Akbar's Navaratnas. In a scene, Yesudas lip-syncs a song sung by M. Balamuralikrishna.

== Historical inaccuracies ==
- The film was completely shot at Kunchacko's Udaya Studio and failed in setting the Moghul era on screen.
- Akbar's wife Mariam-uz-Zamani is called Jodhabai in the film. Though she has been also referred to by this name in modern times, she was never known as such during her lifetime.

== Soundtrack ==
The music was composed by M. S. Baburaj and the lyrics were written by Vayalar Ramavarma.

Song	Singers	Lyrics	Length (m:ss)
"Aruthe Aruthe"	L. R. Eeswari	Vayalar Ramavarma	
"Baashpakudeerame"	P. Susheela	Vayalar Ramavarma	
"Chakravarthikumaaraa"	L. R. Eeswari	Vayalar Ramavarma	
"Ee Raathrithan Vijanathayil"	P. Susheela	Vayalar Ramavarma	
"Ezhu Chirakulla Theru"	P. Susheela	Vayalar Ramavarma	
"Maathalapoove"	P. Susheela	Vayalar Ramavarma	
"Mukilasimhame"	P. Susheela	Vayalar Ramavarma	
"Nadikalil Sundari"	K. J. Yesudas, B. Vasantha	Vayalar Ramavarma	
"Pranayaganam"	P. Susheela	Vayalar Ramavarma	
"Sapthaswarasudhaa"	P. B. Sreenivas, M. Balamuralikrishna	Vayalar Ramavarma	
"Thaalathil Mugdha"	K. J. Yesudas	Vayalar Ramavarma	
"Vidarumo"	P. Susheela	Vayalar Ramavarma	

== See also ==
- Mughal-e-Azam, a Bollywood adaptation of Prince Salim-Anarkali story
