= Mallanum Mathevanum =

- Directed by: Kunchacko
- Written by: Sarangapani
- Screenplay by: Sarangapani
- Produced by: Kunchacko
- Starring: Prem Nazir; KP Ummer; Sheela; Adoor Bhasi; Thikkurissy Sukumaran Nair
- Cinematography: U. Rajagopal
- Edited by: T. R. Sekhar
- Music by: K. Raghavan; Kumarakam Rajappan
- Production company: Excel Productions
- Distributed by: Excel Productions
- Release date: 3 September 1976
- Country: India
- Language: Malayalam

Mallanum Mathevanum is a 1976 Indian Malayalam-language film, directed and produced by Kunchacko. The film stars Prem Nazir, KP Ummer, Sheela, Adoor Bhasi, Jayan and Thikkurissy Sukumaran Nair in the lead roles. The film has musical score by K. Raghavan and Kumarakam Rajappan.

== Cast ==
- Prem Nazir
- K. P. Ummer
- Jayan
- Sheela
- Adoor Bhasi
- Thikkurissy Sukumaran Nair
- Unnimary
- Janardanan
- Master Raghu
- Rani Chandra

== Soundtrack ==
The music was composed by K. Raghavan and Kumarakam Rajappan.

No.	Song	Singers	Lyrics
1	"Chakravaalathin" (In Memory of Kunchacko)	Pattanakkad Purushothaman	P. Bhaskaran
2	"Jyothirmayee"	Chorus, Jayashree	Poochakkal Shahul Hameed
3	"Kalikkuttipraayam Padi Kadannu"	P. Susheela, Chorus	P. Bhaskaran
4	"Kandaalazhakulla"	P. Susheela, P. Jayachandran	P. Bhaskaran
5	"Kuliru Kuliru"	Jayashree, Pattanakkad Purushothaman	P. Bhaskaran
6	"Ottiyavayattile"	B. Vasantha	P. Bhaskaran
7	"Pranayamalarkkaavil"	K. J. Yesudas, K. P. Brahmanandan, Selma George	P. Bhaskaran
