= Punnapra Vayalar =

- Directed by: Kunchacko
- Written by: S. L. Puram Sadanandan
- Produced by: M. Kunchacko
- Starring: Prem Nazir; Kalaikkal Kumaran; Sheela; Adoor Bhasi; P. J. Antony
- Music by: K. Raghavan
- Production company: Excel Productions
- Release date: 12 July 1968
- Country: India
- Language: Malayalam

Punnapra Vayalar is a 1968 Indian Malayalam-language film, directed and produced by Kunchacko. It is based on the Punnapra-Vayalar uprising. The film stars Prem Nazir, Sheela, Adoor Bhasi and P. J. Antony in the lead roles. The film had musical score by K. Raghavan.

== Cast ==
- Prem Nazir as Prabhakaran
- Sheela as Chelamma
- Adoor Bhasi as Gopalji
- P. J. Antony as Kochu Naanu
- Thikkurussi Sukumaran Nair as Maariyaveedan
- N. Govindankutty as Achuthan
- Sharada as Malathi
- Bahadoor as Paappi Mooppan
- Kalaikkal Kumaran as Basheer
- Khadeeja as Mariya
- Kottarakkara Sreedharan Nair as Neelakandan
- S. P. Pillai as Ouseph
- Ushakumari as Chinnamma
- Vanakkutty as Vaasu
- Kaduvakulam Antony as Velayudhan
- Adoor Pankajam as PK Vilasiniyamma
- Manavalan Joseph as Kandarkunju
- G. K. Pilla as SI Rajan
- Pankajavalli as Prabhakaran's mother

== Soundtrack ==
The music was composed by K. Raghavan and the lyrics were written by Vayalar Ramavarma and P. Bhaskaran.

No.	Song	Singers	Lyrics	Length (m:ss)
1	"Angekkarayingekkara"	P. Susheela	Vayalar Ramavarma	
2	"Angoru Naattilu"	Renuka	Vayalar Ramavarma	
3	"Elelo" (Bit)	Chorus	P. Bhaskaran	
4	"Enthinaanee Kaivilangukal"	P. Susheela	Vayalar Ramavarma	
5	"Kanniyilam Kili"	P Susheela	Vayalar Ramavarma	
6	"Sakhakkale Munnottu"	K. J. Yesudas	Vayalar Ramavarma	
7	"Uyarum Njan Naadake"	K. J. Yesudas, Chorus	P. Bhaskaran	
8	"Vayalaarinnoru"	M. Balamuralikrishna	P. Bhaskaran	
