= Neela Ponman =

Neelapponmaan
- Directed by: Kunchacko
- Written by: P. K. Sarangapani
- Screenplay by: P. K. Sarangapani
- Produced by: Kunchacko
- Starring: Prem Nazir; KPAC Lalitha; Adoor Bhasi; Sreelatha Namboothiri
- Cinematography: Marcus Bartley
- Edited by: T. R. Sekhar
- Music by: Salil Chowdhary
- Production company: Excel Productions
- Distributed by: Excel Productions
- Release date: 1 August 1975
- Country: India
- Language: Malayalam

Neelapponmaan is a 1975 Indian Malayalam-language film, directed and produced by Kunchacko. The film stars Prem Nazir, KPAC Lalitha, Adoor Bhasi and Sreelatha Namboothiri in the lead roles. The film has very low quality of making, screenplay, as well as acting compared to the deep and touching musical score by Salil Chowdhary.

== Plot ==
Ivano is an earnest Russian (Soviet) scientist who has come down to stay in a forested area in Thekkady, Kerala to research on finding a cure for snakebites. A bold and bubbly maiden Veluthamma attracts his attention when she bravely captures a king cobra which he uses to develop his cure. The local zamindar Sankara Prabhu hosts Ivano with the intention of getting him to marry one of his daughters and thereby capture the riches to be brought by the cure. He enlists Dr. Pavithran who is set to marry his other daughter as Ivano's assistant, for this purpose.

Meanwhile, Veluthamma who is destined by her parents to marry her dumb fiancée Pappy is naturally attracted to the sophisticated and kind Ivano, much to the upset of both poor Pappy as well as Sankara Prabhu.

When Ivano succeeds in creating his magic cures that can bring back even dead people, they run out of options to test it as nobody dares. Veluthamma is the only one who bravely consents to be tested, touching Ivano deeply, and he refrains from such an illegal activity.

Though Sankara Prabhu and his greedy daughters try their best to entice Ivano to an alliance, Ivano makes it clear that he intents his wife to be a working professional and one who does service to society. Disappointed, as a back up plan, Sankara Prabhu connives with Dr. Pavithran to steal the cure in case Ivano does not marry his daughter.

Meanwhile, Dr. Pavithran, who was initially in on Sankara Prabhu's devious plans, gets a change of heart and declines to forfeit his ethics as a doctor. This devastates Sankara Prabhu as now, both his Plan A as well as B are foiled.

At this point, Veluthamma is accidentally bitten by a cobra and brought to Ivano's lab, where he immediately proceeds to administer the cure to her. However a bitter and cruel Sankara Prabhu replaces the cure, and Ivano is shocked to see that his cure suddenly does not work.

While everyone is aggrieved to realise that Veluthamma will die, her fiancée Pappy, in his heartbroken bitterness, kicks the captured cobra's glass case, shattering it, and in a poetic twist of fate, the escaped cobra bites Sankara Prabhu's daughter Urmila. Panicked and brought to his knees by God's own hands, Sankara Prabhu is forced to confess what he did and bring up the original bottle of cure so that his daughter may live. Ivano immediately saves Urmila, and then attempts to save Veluthamma too, though it has become risky as time has passed.

Ivano's nightmare during this period of waiting shows Veluthamma dying and being cremated with a heartbreaking note. However, in reality, Veluthamma responds to the cure and lives again. The film ends on a note by Ivano that he is satisfied and that he will stay in the country now.

== Cast ==
- Prem Nazir as Ivano
- KPAC Lalitha as Kotha
- Adoor Bhasi as Kutty
- Sreelatha Namboothiri as Kochukalyani
- K. P. Ummer as Dr. Pavithran
- N. Govindankutty as MLA
- Sakunthala as Urmila
- Sumithra as Veluthamma
- Thikkurissy Sukumaran Nair as Sankara Prabhu
- Bahadoor as Paappi
- Alummoodan as Kumaran
- Adoor Pankajam as Akkomma
- Paul Vengola as Kochuraman

== Soundtrack ==
All lyrics are written by Vayalar Ramavarma; all music is composed by Salil Chowdhury.

Track listing
No.	Title	Artist(s)	Length
1.	"Kaadu Karuthakaadu"	K. J. Yesudas, Choir
2.	"Kanneerilente Manthoni" (Bit)	K. J. Yesudas
3.	"Kannil Meenaadum"	S. Janaki, B. Vasantha
4.	"Kilu Kilum"	S. Janaki
5.	"Poomaala Poonkuzhali" (Kilu Kilum)	S. Janaki
6.	"Russian Song"
7.	"Theyyam Theyyam Thare"	P. Susheela, P. Jayachandran, Choir
