= Pathirappally =

- village
- Location in Kerala, India Pathirappally (India)
- Coordinates: 9°32′0″N 76°19′0″E
- Country: India
- State: Kerala
- District: Alappuzha

Languages
  - Official: Malayalam, English
- Time zone: UTC+5:30 (IST)
- PIN: 688521, 688006
- Vehicle registration: KL-04
- Nearest city: Alappuzha

Pathirappally is a coastal village in Alleppey District, Kerala state, India. It lies along the new coastal road, about 5 km from the town of Alleppey. It is a village in Mararikulam South and Aryad panchayats of Alappuzha district, Kerala.

== Nearer Places ==
The most famous Film Studio Named Udaya Studio is situated here. KSDP (Kerala State Drugs and Pharmaceuticals Limited) is situated near this Studio.
