= Krishnapillai =

Krishnapillai is a surname. Notable people with the surname include:

- G. Krishnapillai, Sri Lankan politician
- Henry Alfred Krishnapillai (1827–1900), Indian poet
