= Kunchacko =

Indian film director

- Born: M. C. Kunchako; 19 February 1912; Pulinkunnoo, Travancore, British India
- Died: 15 June 1976 (aged 64); Madras, Tamil Nadu, India
- Occupations: Film producer, director
- Years active: 1947–1976
- Spouse: Annamma Kunchacko
- Relatives: Kunchacko Boban (grandson), Navodaya Appachan (Brother)

Maliampurackal Chacko Kunchacko (19 February 1912 – 15 June 1976) was an Indian film producer and director who worked in the Malayalam film industry. His venture Udaya Studios influenced the gradual shift of Malayalam film industry from its original base of Madras, Tamil Nadu to Kerala. He was the producer of Jeevithanauka (1951), starring Thikkurissy Sukumaran Nair.

== Family ==
Kunchacko was born in a Syro Malabar Catholic family in Alappuzha, Kerala. He hailed from the Maliampurakal family. His father, M. M. Chacko, started the first boat service in Kuttanadu. His brother M. C. Punnoose, known as Navodaya Appachan, was known for his work in Malayalam cinema, especially as the founder of Navodaya Studio. His nephew Jijo Punnose is a film director.

His son, Boban Kunchacko, was also an actor, director, and producer who was part of a few films produced by Udaya.

His grandson, Kunchacko Boban is also a Malayalam film actor.

== Career ==
In 1947, he established Udaya Studio in Pathirappally, Alappuzha. In his early days, Kunchacko produced films under the banner of K & K Productions, with the partnership of K. V. Koshy. The company produced 4 films: Vellinakshatram, Nalla Thanka, Jeevithanauka and Visappinte Vili. Jeevithanauka (1951), starring Thikkurissy Sukumaran Nair ran for 250 days. During the making of the film Achchan, Kunchacko and Koshy parted ways and each started film-making under separate banners: Kunchacko under Udaya and Koshi under Filmco. Kunchacko went on to produce Achchan, Avan Varunnu and Kidappadam under the banner of Udaya. Kidappadam was a commercial failure, and that caused Kunchacko to close down Udaya Studio. However, Udaya was opened within a few years with the help of his friend and Kerala state minister T. V. Thomas.

In 1960, Kunchacko tried his hand in film direction with Umma, which he followed with Neeli Saali and Seetha. He went on to direct 40 films in his career of many genres including purana stories, vadakkan pattu stories, comedy films and social themed films. Some of his films are Bharya, Unniyarcha, Palattukoman, Sakunthala, Pazhassiraja, Mainatheruvi Kolacase, Ponnapuram Kotta, Anarkali and Kannappanunni. His career in film direction went along with his career as film producer. He produced films directed by various directors such as M. Krishnan Nair (Agni Mrigam, Thara, Kattuthulasi), A. Vincent (Gandharva Kshethram), Thoppil Bhasi (Oru Sundariyude Katha, Ningalenne Communistakki), K.S. Sethumadhavan (Koottukudumbam) and K. Raghunath (Laura Neeyevide). In 1976, Kunchacko died in Madras, Tamil Nadu with musician K. Raghavan for the song recording of the film Mallanum Mathevanum. Kannappanunni was the last film directed by him. His death occurred on the fifth death anniversary (15 June) of the veteran Malayalam actor Sathyan, who acted in many of his films. Kunchako's Udaya Studios faced heavy losses later, and stopped production.

== Filmography ==
=== Direction ===
- Kannappanunni (1977)
- Chennai Valarthiya Kutty (1976); starring Prem Nazir, Sharada, Jayabharathi and Adoor Bhasi, musical score by M. K. Arjunan
- Mallanum Mathevanum (1976)
- Cheenavala (1975)
- Dharmakshetre Kurukshetre (1975)
- Manishada (1975)
- Neela Ponman (1975)
- Durga (1974)
- Thumbolarcha (1974)
- Pavangal Pennungal (1973)
- Ponnapuram Kotta (1973)
- Thenaruvi (1973)
- Aromalunni (1972)
- Postmane Kananilla (1972)
- Panchavan Kadu (1971)
- Dattuputhran (1970)
- Othenente Makan (1970)
- Pearl View (1970)
- Susie (1969)
- Kodungalluramma (1968)
- Punnapra Vyalar (1968)
- Thirichadi (1968)
- Kasavuthattam (1967)
- Mainatharuvi Kola Case (1967)
- Anarkali (1966)
- Jail (1966)
- Tilottama (1966)
- Inapravugal (1965)
- Shakuntala (1965)
- Ayesha (1964)
- Pazhassi Raja (1964)
- Kadalamma (1963)
- Rebecca (1963)
- Bharya (1962)
- Palattukoman (1962)
- Krishna Kuchela (1961/I)
- Unniyarcha (1961)
- Neeli Sally (1960)
- Seeta (1960)
- Umma (1960)
