= Thumbolarcha =

- Directed by: Kunchacko
- Written by: P. K. Sarangapani
- Screenplay by: P. K. Sarangapani
- Produced by: M. Kunchacko
- Starring: Prem Nazir; Sheela; Srividya; Thikkurissy Sukumaran Nair
- Edited by: T. R. Sekhar
- Music by: G. Devarajan
- Production company: Udaya
- Distributed by: Udaya
- Release date: 23 August 1974
- Country: India
- Language: Malayalam

Thumbolarcha is a 1974 Indian Malayalam-language film, directed and produced by Kunchacko. The film stars Prem Nazir, Sheela, Srividya and Thikkurissy Sukumaran Nair. The film has musical score and songs composed by G. Devarajan. An interesting fact about this movie was, Sheela charged more money than the lead hero, which was quite unusual back in the day, and even today.

== Plot ==
The film depicts an episode in the youth of Puthooram Aromal Chekavar and cousin Chandu before the infamous fatal duel described in the film Unniyarcha (1961).

Thumbolarcha, the fair warrior maiden of Mikavil Mikacheri family, is a fiancée by cross-cousinage of Aromal Chekavar and they both wish to marry. However, as fate would have it, Archa's life is turned upside down when one night, a distraught father with his pregnant daughter in labour appear at their doorstep confounded by weather. The magnanimous Archa take them in and offer them the best hospitality and service in the absence of her family, and the lady gives birth to a boy safely. However the father escapes with the daughter before dawn leaving the child at Mikacheri house, implying that this was an illegitimate pregnancy that nobody likes to acknowledge. Archa, though upset at the situation, refuses to dispose off the baby as her friends suggest and decides to bring the baby up herself. This, however, leads to speculations that the baby is her own, and even her own parents and uncle who return from a trip of many months from the North, fall suspicious of Archa's affection for the baby and start believing that she herself became pregnant and delivered during their absence.

Aromal's parents Kannappa Chekavar and wife, who arrived to formally decide the marriage of Aromal and Archa gets to witness the scandal firsthand and decide against the proposal. Back home, Aromal himself is sympathetic at first though the overwhelming public opinion and misogynist scandal all over the place influence him to summarily reject Thumbolarcha, his love for long, shocking her to the core. Furthermore, Aromal's family quickly finds him another alliance and he is compelled to marry soon. Watching from her balcony, Archa is shocked to realise that Aromal's bride Kunjunnooli is none other than the lady who delivered the baby at her house earlier. She decides against making a revelation fearing for Kunjunnooli's life and reputation, while Kunjunnooli herself is upset to see Archa and later devastated to know from Aromal of their past affair. Realising that she herself was the reason behind the ruin of Thumbolarcha's life and Aromal's love, she argues with Aromal for Archa's case and pleads that he save Archa too from the disgraced life that she has been condemned to.

Archa herself, though devastated by the most unkindest cut served by the love of her life, resigns to her fate and decides to devote her life to raising the baby. But her family would naturally have none of that. Her father and uncle go on to court Chandu Chekavar, Aromal's cousin, who also had an eye on Archa but was summarily rejected by them all. Chandu demands that Archa undergo a so-called Test of Fire at the local temple to prove her fidelity and further demand that the baby be killed if he is to marry Archa. Archa's family is all set to agree and Archa realises that she has no choice. She also happens to witness Chandu personally strangling the baby at her house. Determined to exact revenge on him, she declares that she would prove her fidelity on the appointed day and further put to test any warrior who wishes to court her; she would marry only a warrior who can defeat her. Chandu who underestimates Archa and has a deluded image of himself, agrees in amusement.

On the appointed day, in a dramatic magical display, Archa proves her fidelity before a large audience by emerging unscathed from fire. She further challenges any warrior who wishes to court her and proceeds to defeat everybody present hand down, including the acclaimed Chandu Chekavar himself. At this point, a crude tribal youth emerges as a suitor and defeats Archa to everybody's surprise. Impressed, Archa submits herself in marriage to him, though her family as well as Chandu seethe in humiliation. Archa is taken to the tribal youth's hut and she moves in with his family, happily blending in. However, the enigmatic youth leaves on an errand of work into the deep forest without consummating their marriage, for which he promises to return on a certain auspicious night.

At this time, her family and Chandu come into an unholy pact and abduct her from her husband's family by crook. Archa is placed under custody in her own home and preparations are underway to arrange Chandu's marriage ceremony with her. Hearing of the developments in Archa's life and sympathising with her, Aromal decides to intervene on behalf of her and her tribal husband. Aromal's family is however, wary of any further exchanges with Archa and discourage him. As such, Aromal plays a double game of confounding both his family and Archa's and end up playing security in her own house. On the auspicious night that Archa expects her husband, Aromal enters her bed, overpowers her and has sex with her forcefully. The traumatised Archa is devastated that she couldn't keep herself together for her husband, but is delighted when her tribal youth appears before her to reveal that he was none other than Aromal himself. Together, they arrange a plan to sort things together.

However, Aromal is later removed from the house by Archa's family on Chandu's suspicion, and he is unable to rally help for an all-out attack from his family. Meanwhile, Archa realises that she is pregnant with Aromal's child, and delivers her baby within the confines of her home. Again Chandu, who is still in awe of Archa's beauty, demands that the baby be killed so that he marries her. On a fateful night when the baby is thrown in water and Archa out to save it, Aromal reaches them in time and takes his wife and child home to Puthooram family.

The developments infuriate Chandu and Archa's family, who conclude that Aromal was responsible for both the babies involved, launch an all-out attack on Puthooram family. Before the final showdown, Kunjunnooli reveals that she was the mother of the child delivered earlier at Mikacheril and that Chandu was the father. Thumbolarcha also reveals how she witnessed Chandu strangling the baby, which is now revealed to be his own, born of a dalliance between him and Kunjunnooli when she was his student of Kalari for a brief period. Chandu is shunned by everyone and summarily defeated by Aromal, who pardons his life at the behest of Kannappa Chekavar. Aromal lives happily ever after with his two wives Thumbolarcha and Kunjunnooli.

== Cast ==
- Prem Nazir as Aromal Chekavar
- Sheela as Thumbolarcha
- Srividya as Kunjunnooli
- Thikkurissy Sukumaran Nair as Kannappa Chekavar
- Adoor Pankajam as Ponni
- G. K. Pillai as Udayappan, Thumbolarcha's father
- K. P. Ummer as Elavannur Madathil Chandu
- Kanchana (old)
- N. Govindankutty as Thumbolarcha's uncle
- Pala Thankam as Paanathi
- Premji
- Rajakokila as Theyi
- S. P. Pillai as Panar
- Sumithra as Thamara
- Adoor Bhasi as Bidanthan
- Pankajavalli as Thumbolarcha's mother
- Paravoor Bharathan as Kunjunnooli's father

== Soundtrack ==
The music was composed by G. Devarajan and the lyrics were written by Vayalar Ramavarma.

No.	Song	Singers	Lyrics	Length (m:ss)
1	"Aakaasham Mungiya"	P. Susheela	Vayalar Ramavarma	
2	"Arayannakkilichundan"	P. Madhuri, Chorus	Vayalar Ramavarma	
3	"Atham Rohini"	L. R. Eeswari, Latha Raju	Vayalar Ramavarma	
4	"Kannaanthalimuttam Poothedi"	P. Susheela	Vayalar Ramavarma	
5	"Mallaakshi Madiraakshi"	K. J. Yesudas, P. Madhuri	Vayalar Ramavarma	
6	"Manjappalunkan Malayioode"	P. Susheela	Vayalar Ramavarma	
7	"Paanante Veenakku"	K. J. Yesudas, P. Madhuri, Latha Raju	Vayalar Ramavarma	
8	"Thrippankottappa"	P. Susheela	Vayalar Ramavarma	
