= G. K. Pillai (actor) =

Indian actor (1924–2021)

- Born: G Keshava Pillai; July 1924; Chirayinkeezhu, Kingdom of Travancore, British India (present-day Thiruvananthapuram, Kerala)
- Died: 31 December 2021 (aged 97); Edava, Kerala, India
- Occupations: Film actor, military officer
- Years active: 1954–1988, 2001–2019
- Spouse(s): Ulpalakshiyamma, Princess of Edava (deceased)
- Children: 6

G. Keshava Pillai (July 1924 – 31 December 2021) was an Indian actor and former soldier known for his work in Malayalam cinema. He was active for 65 years, acting in more than 325 Malayalam films, and is known for revolutionising the role of the antagonist in Indian cinema and television. He was known for his acclaimed villain roles in Vadakkanpattu action films, historical films and other action films during the 70s and 80s. He took also many notable roles in family-focused films and TV shows. He is the only actor during the 80s to have accomplished most of his stunts in films without the use of stunt doubles.

== Life and career ==
Pillai was born in Chirayinkeezhu in July 1924 to Perumpaattathil Govindapillai and Saraswathi Amma. He received his primary education from Chirayenkeezhu Sree Chithira Thirunal High School. He was married to the late Princess of Edava, Ulpalakshiyamma, and has six children named; K Prathapachandran, Sreekala R Nair, Sreelekha Mohan, Sreekumari B Pilla, Chandramohanan and K Priyadarshanan. His debut movie was Snehaseema in 1954. He joined Indian military before entering films. He served in both the Indian Army and the Indian Navy, and was a decorated veteran of WWII. After a long career in films, he began to act in TV serials too. His TV debut was in the serial 'Aakaasaththile Paravakal ', directed by Madhupal and telecast in Kairali TV. He later appeared in many TV serials. His portrayal in the serial 'Kumkumapoovu' got wide attention. Princess Ulpalakshiamma, his wife, died in 2011. Pillai died at his home in Edava on 31 December 2021 at the age of 97.

== Awards ==
G. K. Pillai secured hundreds of awards in his career, but notably received these prestigious awards:

- 2005 Best Character Actor (for his role in serial :Megham)–Asianet television awards
- 2011 Madras Film Fans Association
- 2011 Jayan Ragamalika Award
- 2011 Prem Nazir Award
- 2012 Lifetime Achievement Award (for his role in Kumkumapoovu )- Asianet Television Awards 2012
- 2016 Lifetime Achievement Award (for his roles in several serials )- Flowers Television Awards
- 2018 Lifetime Achievement Award (for his roles in several serials )- Janmabhoomi Television Awards

== Filmography ==
- Snehaseema (1954) as Pooppally Thomas
- Manthravaadi (1956)
- Deva Sundari (1957)
- Achanum Makanum (1957)
- Minnunnathellam Ponnalla (1957)
- Nairu Pidicha Pulivalu (1958) as Gopi
- Arappavan (1961)
- Jnaana Sundari (1961) as King Shimayon
- Ummini Thanka (1961) as Raman Thampi
- Shree Rama Pattabhishekam (1962)
- Vidhi Thanna Vilakku (1962)
- Veluthambi Dalawa (1962)
- Swargarajyam (1962)
- Snapaka Yohannan (1963) as Pilate
- Kalayum Kaaminiyum (1963)
- Kadathukaran (1965) as Rajan
- Rajamalli (1965)
- Kavyamela (1965) as Dr.Panikkar
- Kalithozhan (1966)
- Puthri (1966) as Chackochan
- Sthanarthi Saramma (1966) as Thomachan
- Kanakachilanka (1966)
- Tharavattamma (1966) as Madhavankutty
- Kadamattathachan (1966)
- Ashwamedham (1967) as Mohanan's Father
- Bhagyamudra (1967)
- Ollathu Mathi (1967)
- Pooja (1967)
- Chithramela (1967)
- Paathira Pattu (1967)
- Kottayam Kolacase (1967)
- Cochin Express (1967)
- Kanaatha Veshangal (1967)
- Inspector (1968)
- Punnapra Vayalar (1968) as SI Rajan
- Lakshaprabhu (1968)
- Kaayalkkarayil (1968)
- Anchusundarikal (1968)
- Padunna Puzha (1968) as Govinda Pilla
- Agnipareeksha (1968) as Krishna Kuruppu
- Danger Biscuit (1969) as K.J.Pillai
- Kannoor Deluxe (1969) as K B Pilla
- Moodalmanju (1970) as Chandrasekharan Nair
- Naazhikakkallu (1970)
- Ezhuthaatha Kadha (1970)
- Othenente Makan (1970) as Kunkan
- Lottery Ticket (1970)
- Mindaapennu (1970) as Kunjikelu Menon
- Kaakkathampuraatti (1970)
- Vimochanasamaram (1971)
- Agnimrigam (1971)
- Yogamullaval (1971)
- Panchavan Kaadu (1971) as Thanu Pilla
- Aromalunni (1972)
- Nrithasaala (1972) as Vamban Velayudan
- Maaya (1972) as Panki Pilla
- Jesus (1973)
- Thenaruvi (1973)
- Football Champion (1973) as John Stephen
- Ponnapuram Kotta (1973)
- Thumbolarcha (1974) as Udayappa Chekavar
- Durga (1974)
- Udyaanalakshmi (1976)
- Seemanthaputhran (1976)
- Light House (1976)
- Aval Oru Devaalayam (1977)
- Sreemad Bhagavadgeetha (1977)
- Kaduvaye Pidicha Kiduva (1977)
- Thacholi Ambu (1978)
- Kadathanaattu Maakkam (1978)
- Aanakkalari (1978)
- Aanappaachan (1978)
- Raju Rahim (1978)
- Irumbazhikal (1979) as Sankara Pilla
- Choola (1979)
- Lava (1980) as Police officer
- Paalaattu Kunjikkannan (1980)
- Chora Chuvanna Chora (1980)
- Chandrahaasam (1980)
- Deepam (1980)
- Vedikkettu (1980)
- Sanchari (1981) as Keshavan
- Avathaaram (1981) as Parameshwaran Pilla
- Valarthumrigangal (1981)
- Manassinte Theerthayaathra (1981)
- Orikkalkkoodi (1981)
- Ankuram (1982)
- Ee Nadu (1982) as Joshi John
- Padayottam (1982)
- Vidhichathum Kothichathum (1982)
- Jambulingam (1982)
- Rathilayam (1983)
- Iniyenkilum (1983)
- Aazhi (1985)
- Vellam (1985)
- Kulambadikal (1986)
- August 1 (1988)
- Ee Raavil (2001)
- Kanavu (2002)
- Madhuram (2002)
- Koottu (2004)
- Mukhamariyaathe (2006)
- NaalU Pennungal (2007)
- Thathwamasi (2009)
- Njaan Sanchaari (2010)
- Kaaryasthan (2010)
- The Metro (2011)
- Warning (2012)
- Anavaranam (2012)
- Manikya Thamburattiyum Christmas Carolum (2013)
- Loka Samastha (2015)
- Elinjikkavu PO (2015)
- Chirakodinja Kinavukal (2015)
- Thinkal Muthal Velli Vare (2015)
- Vishwa Vikhyatharaya Payyanmar (2017)
- Nimisham (2018)
- Ente Sathyanweshana Pareekshakal (2019)

== Television ==
- 2001 - Porutham (Surya TV)
- 2005 - Kadamattathu Kathanar (Asianet)
- 2004 - Megham (Asianet)
- 2006 - Ammamanassu (Asianet)
- 2009–2010 - Ente Manasaputhri (Asianet)
- 2009 - Pakalmazha (Amrita TV)
- 2010 - Autograph (Asianet)
- 2010 - Mattoruval (Surya TV)
- 2011–2014 - Kumkumapoovu (Asianet)
- 2011 - Ividam Swargamanu (Surya TV)
- 2011 - Veera Marthanda Varma (Surya TV)
- 2012 - Manasaveena (Mazhavil Manorama)
- 2013 - Chattambi Kalyani (JaiHind TV)
- 2014 - Avalude Katha (Surya TV)
- 2015 - Dhathuputhri (Mazhavil Manorama)
- 2015 - Spandhanam (Surya TV)
- 2017–2018 - Mamangam (Flowers TV)
- Aanineyum Pennineyum Kurichu (DD Malayalam) - telefilm
- 2019 - Thamarathumbi (Surya TV)
