= Udaya Studios =

Film studio in India

- Udaya Studios logo
- Type: Film production
- Industry: Motion pictures
- Founded: 1947
- Founder: Kunchacko
- Headquarters: Pathirappally, Alappuzha, Kerala
- Key people: Kunchacko; Navodaya Appachan; Boban Kunchacko; Kunchacko Boban
- Products: Films
- Divisions: Excel Productions

Udaya Studios is one of the oldest film studios in the Malayalam film industry of India. It was established in 1947 by director-producer Kunchacko (1912–1976) and film distributor K. V. Koshy in Pathirappally, Alappuzha in Kerala. The studio influenced the gradual shift of Malayalam film industry from Madras (now Chennai), in Tamil Nadu, to Kerala. The first film of the studio was Vellinakshatram (1949).

The films made at the studio were produced under the banner of K & K Productions, and later under Excel Productions (also spelled X. L. Productions). Udaya's professional rivalry with P. Subramaniam's Merryland Studio was quite famous.

== History ==
Kunchacko established a film production company named Udaya Pictures in 1947, though he continued production at Madras, the traditional base of Malayalam film, but all that changed in 1947 when he came together with film distributors K. V. Koshy and R. A. Krishnan and established Udaya Studios in Alleppey (Alappuzha), and in time the studio also set up its own distribution network. Soon it had a string of successes with blockbusters based on Vadakkan Pattu.

=== Resuming production ===
Years after the defunct Excel Productions, Kunchacko Boban established a new film production company Udaya Pictures and produced the 2016 film Kochauvva Paulo Ayyappa Coelho directed by Sidhartha Siva, thus reviving the prestigious Malayalam production house after 30 years.

== Films ==
=== Udaya Studios ===
- Unniyarcha (1961)
- Palattukoman (1962)
- Othenante Makan (1970)
- Postmane Kananilla (1972)
- Aromalunni (1972)
- Ponnapuram Kotta (1973)
- Thumbolarcha (1974)
- Kannappanunni (1977)
- Palattu Kunjikannan (1980)

=== Udaya Pictures ===
- Kochauvva Paulo Ayyappa Coelho (2016)
- Nna Thaan Case Kodu (2022) (co-produced with Kavya Film Company)
- Bougainvillea (2024) (co-produced with Amal Neerad Productions)
- Oru Durooha Saahacharyathil (2026) (co-produced with Magic Frames)

== See also ==
- Navodaya Studio
- Merryland Studio
