= Kaduvakkulam Antony =

Indian film actor

Kaduvakulam Antony
- Born: P. T. Antony; 9 November 1936; Kuttanad, Travancore, British India
- Died: 4 February 2001 (aged 64); Kaduvakulam, Kottayam district, Kerala, India
- Occupation: Film actor
- Years active: 1960–2001
- Spouse: Biatrice
- Children: 2
- Parent(s): Thomas and Annamma

Kaduvakulam Antony (9 November 1936 – 4 February 2001) was an Indian actor from Kerala, best known for his work in Malayalam cinema. Active primarily between the 1960s and 1990s, he appeared in over 300 films, earning recognition for his comedic timing and memorable character roles. One journalist considers him one of the best and most popular comedians in Malayalam cinema.

== Early life and family ==
Pallivathukal Thomas Antony, better known by his stage name Kaduvakulam Antony, was born on 9 November 1936 into a Syro-Malabar Catholic family in Kuttanad, Alappuzha, Kerala, India, to Pallivathukal Thomas and Annamma. He was the youngest of eight children, two of whom died in infancy. When he was two years old, his family relocated to Kaduvakulam in Kottayam district. He completed his education up to the 10th grade in Kottayam.

== Personal life ==
Antony married Biatrice in 1971. The couple has two children: a son, Tomydas Antony, and a daughter, Sonia Antony. Tomydas is a software professional based in Austin, Texas, USA, while Sonia is an entrepreneur and business owner in Bengaluru, India.

== Filmography ==
Year	Film	Role	Note
1961	Bhakta Kuchela		
1962	Sreerama Pattabhishekam		
1962	Snehadeepam	Factory worker	
1964	Sree Guruvayoorappan	Olapram Pachan	
1965	Bhoomiyile Malakha	Jimmy	
1965	Ammu		
1966	Kalyanarathriyil		
1966	Station Master		
1966	Kanakachilanka		
1966	Kayamkulam Kochunni	Bava	
1966	Pakalkinavu		
1967	Arakillam		
1967	Khadeeja		
1967	Aval		
1967	Iruttinte Athmavu	Jyothsyan	
1967	Mainatheruvi Kolacase		
1967	Kavalam Chundan		
1967	Udhyogastha		
1967	Chitramela		
1967	Olathumathi		
1967	Agniputhri	Paachu Pilla	
1968	Viruthan Shanku	Krishnan	
1968	Thirichadi		
1968	Punnapra Vayalar	Velayudhan	
1968	Ezhu Rathrikal		
1968	Inspecter		
1968	Thulabharam		
1969	Virunnukari	Paramu	
1969	Veettu Mrugam		
1969	Kannoor Deluxe		
1969	Susy		
1969	Jawala		
1970	Moodalmanju	Sankaran Nair	
1970	Nazhikakkallu		
1970	Pearl View	House keeper	
1970	Ambalapravu		
1970	Dathuputhran	Paulose	
1970	Vivaham Swargathil		
1971	Kalithozhi		
1971	Vimochanasamaram		
1971	Bobanum Moliyum		
1972	Pulliman		
1972	Preethi		
1973	Ajnathavasam	Director London	
1973	Thenaruvi		
1973	Pacha Nottukal	Puluvan Thoma	
1973	Masappadi Mathupilla		
1974	Arakkallan Mukkakallan		
1974	Durga		
1974	Pancha Thanthram	Charlie	
1974	Ankathattu		
1974	Sapthaswarangal	Geevargese Chandi	
1974	Rahasya Rathri		
1975	Love Letter		
1975	Chief Guest		
1975	Criminals	Kayangal	
1976	Amma		
1977	Sathyavan Savithri		
1977	Pattalam Janaki		
1978	Thacholi Ambu		
1978	Thamburatti	Padmanabha Kurup	
1978	Beena	Kunjappi	
1978	Kanalkattakal	Keshavankutty	
1978	Mukkuvine Snehicha Bhootham		
1979	Avalude Prathikaram		
1979	Lillypookkal		
1979	Pichathikuttappan		
1979	Driver Madyapichirunnu		
1979	Maamaankam	Velappan	
1980	Vedikettu		
1981	Agnisaram		
1982	Kakka		
1982	Vidhichathum Kothichathum		
1982	Keni		
1982	Aarambham	Anthappan	
1982	Kaalam	Kurup	
1982	Padayotam		
Panchajanyam	Kuttan Pilla		
1983	Ahankaram		
1983	Ee Yugam as Pappan		
1983	Ankam	Krishna Pilla	
1984	Kadamattathachan	Thomachan	
1984	Krishna Guruvaayoorappa		
1985	Azhi		
1985	Chorakku Chora	Paramu	
1985	Kiratham	Narayana Pilla	
1985	Njan Piranna Nattil	Police constable	
1986	Kulambadikal		
1986	Arorui Arangorungi		
1987	Nee Allenkil Njan	Philip	
1987	Kaalathinte Sabhdam	Kunjan Nair	
1987	Kottum Kuravayum		
1987	Narathan Keralathil		
1990	Niyamam Enthucheyyum		
1990	Kadathanadan Ambadi		
1991	Mimics Parade		
1995	Mannar Mathai Speaking	drama booking agent	
1995	Highway	Kallu Vareeth	
1995	Arabia (film)	PC Velapp	
1995	Thumboli Kadappuram		
1996	Aramana Veedum Anjoorekkarum		
