= Thikkurissy Sukumaran Nair =

Indian actor

- Born: Sukumaran Nair; 16 October 1916; Thickurichy, Near Marthandam, Travancore, British India (present day Kanyakumari, Tamil Nadu, India)
- Died: 11 March 1997 (aged 80); Thiruvananthapuram, Kerala, India
- Occupations: Actor; film director; film producer
- Years active: 1950–1997
- Spouses: Sarojini Kunjamma; Ambalapuzha Meenakshy Amma; K. Sulochana Devi
- Children: 4
- Parents: M. C. Govinda Pillai; N. Lekshmi Amma
- Awards: Padma Shri (1973)

Thikkurissy Sukumaran Nair (16 October 1916 – 11 March 1997) was an Indian poet, playwright, script writer, lyricist, orator, film director and actor, though he is best known as an actor in Malayalam cinema. He is the recipient of Padma Shri from the Government of India, which the fourth highest civilian honour in India. In a career that spanned about 47 years, he acted in over 700 films. He is considered to be the "first superstar of Malayalam cinema". In 1993, he was honoured with the J. C. Daniel Award, Kerala government's highest honour for contributions to Malayalam cinema.

== Early life ==
Sukumaran Nair was born on 16 October 1916 in the village of Thikkurissy, Nagercoil, then part of Travancore. The village of Thikkurissy is now in Nanchilnadu, Nagercoil, Kanyakumari district, Tamil Nadu. He was born to N. Lekshmi Amma and M. C. Govinda Pillai of the Mangat house, an aristocratic Nair family. He was a good writer and an orator even when he was doing his schooling in Marthandam Government Boys School. He wrote his first poem at the age of 8 and his poem was published for the first time when he was 14 in Dhakshina Bharathi. His poems were collectively published as a book named Kedavilakku when he was 20. His parents wanted him to secure a government job, but he launched his career in writing and arts even before he completed his studies. Incidentally, his sister L. Omanakkunjamma was the first female magistrate in India.

== Career ==
He launched his career as a playwright. His plays Mareechika and Kalakaran were hugely successful. He then went on to write three more—Sthree, Maya and Sheriyo Thetto—that revolutionised the professional play scenario in Malayalam. He replaced the melodramatic romantic musicals, which ruled the roost till then, with dialogue centred prose plays having themes of realism and social importance.

He entered the Malayalam film industry in 1950, which was in its early years with only about 10 films produced. He debuted in the industry with the film adaptation of his breakthrough play Sthree. He produced the film and played the protagonist as well. It failed to make much impact at the box office, the film scene in Kerala then being ruled by Tamil and Hindi films. Thikkurussy's next film Jeevitha Nouka (1951), produced by K and K Productions and directed by K. Vembu, was a turning point in Malayalam film history. It dealt with the theme of ego clashes in a joint family and was a big commercial success: It is touted as the first superhit in Malayalam film history. The success also made Thikkurissy the first superstar of Kerala. Jeevitha Nouka was dubbed into four languages including Hindi. In 1952, he acted in Navalokam with a socially significant theme with Miss Kumari, who would later become the pet of the masses after the success of Neelakkuyil (1954). Navalokam did not make it big at the box office, but Thikkurissy cemented his superstardom with a big hit in the same year.

Visappinte Vili featured Prem Nazir, then a novice. Thikkurissy coined Prem Nazir's screen name (his actual name was Abdul Khader). In 1953, another landmark of his, Sheriyo Thetto, was released. It was a film adaptation of his play of the same name. Sheriyo Thetto had him handling the story, screenplay, dialogues, lyrics and direction departments besides playing the pivotal role. With that Thikkurissy established himself as an inseparable element of Malayalam film industry. In 1968, he acted in the first full-length comedy film, Viruthan Shanku, directed by P. Venu. He was credited with lyrics, screenplay and direction in many films. The 13 films for which he was the lyricist includes Sthree, Palunku Paathram, Devasundari, Urvashi Bharathi, Poojapushpam and Balloon. He wrote story and screenplay for Muthalali and Aana Valarthiya Vanampadi. He directed the films Sheriyo Thetto, Poojapushpam, Achante Bharya, Palunkupathram, Saraswati, Nurse and Urvashi Bharathi. His major acting ventures are Jeevithanauka, Navalokam, Visappinte Vili, Iruttinte Atmavu, Swayamvaram, Umma, Bhakthakuchela, Nadi, Thulabharam, Maya, Abhijathyam, Surveykkallu, Avanazhi and Aryan.

== Screen-naming ==
Thikkurussy coined screen-names of many actors in Malayalam cinema. Actors who were renamed by Thikkurissy include

- Prem Nazir; actual name: Abdul Khader
- S. J. Dev (stage actor and father of Rajan P. Dev); actual name: Devassia
- Madhu; actual name: Madhavan Nair
- Jose Prakash; actual name: K. J. Joseph
- Bahadoor; actual name: Kunjali
- Kuthiravattom Pappu; actual name: Padmadalakshan

== Personal life ==
Thikkurissy was married three times. His first wife was Sarojini Kunjamma, the daughter of Madhavan Unnithan from the Samudayathil family in Karuvatta, Haripad. They had two daughters: Shyamala Devi Kunjamma, also known as Lekha, who worked as an executive engineer in Ernakulam, and Geethadevi Kunjamma, a housewife in Pujappura, Thiruvananthapuram. After his separation from Sarojini, Thikkurissy married stage actress Ambalapuzha Meenakshy Amma. They had a son, Rajahamsan, who now lives in Chennai. This marriage also ended, and Thikkurissy later married K. Sulochana Devi, a singer and dancer. This third marriage lasted over four decades until his death. They had a daughter, Kanakasree, who was interested in poetry like her father. Kanakasree died in a motorcycle accident in 1989. In his later years, Thikkurissy suffered from various health issues due to his age. He died on 11 March 1997, at the age of 80, in Thiruvananthapuram, Kerala, due to kidney failure.

== Awards ==
The major awards that he received are:

- Padma Shri from the Government of India − 1973
- Filmfare Lifetime Achievement Award – South − 1986
- Kerala State Film Award for Best Actor − 1972
- J. C. Daniel Award (Kerala State Film Award for Lifetime Achievement) – 1995
- Kerala Sangeetha Nataka Akademi Fellowship − 1983
- Mannathu Padmanabhan Award − 1989
- Film Readers Gallup-poll Award − 1963
- All Kerala Social Service Association Award − 1971
- Bombay Nirthya Sindhu Award − 1991
- Guru Chengannur Award 1991
- Prem Nazir Award − 1992
- N.Krishna Pillai Award 1992
- Palakkad Film Festival Award − 1995
- Pushpasree Award − 1995
- Bangalore Kalavedi Award − 1994
- Film Critics Association Award − 1995
- Kerala Kaumudhi Readers Club Award − 1994
- Film Guidance Society Award − 1996
- Government of India Emeritus Fellowship for Contribution in the field of Art and Literature From 1 April 1996 to 31 March 1998
- Talents of Universities Creative Heights Award − 1996
- Navachedhana Award − 1994
- Soorya Award − 1994
- Travancore Devaswam Board Award. – 1972
- Sree Moolanagaram Fine Arts Society Award − 1997
- Abhinaya Saamrat − 1991
- Nataka Chakravarthy − 1991
- Chalachithra Prathibha − 1993
- Chalachithra Rathnam − 1994
- Chalachithra Acharyan − 1994
- Malayala Chalachithra Kulapathy 1994
- Sarasadrutha Kavi − 1994
- Kala Vibhooshan − 1994
- Bheeshma Charya − 1994
- Sarvakala Sarva Bhouman − 1994
- Guru Karanavar − 1995
- Kala Jyothi − 1996
- Sarasa Vachaspathy − 1996
- Sadasya Thilakan − 1996

== Selected filmography ==
=== Direction ===
- Urvashi Bharathi (1973)
- Achante Bharya (1971)
- Palunku Pathram (1970)
- Saraswathi (1970)
- Nurse (1969)
- Poojapushpam (1969)
- Sheriyo Thetto (1953)

=== Writing ===
- Aana Valarthiyal Vanampadiyude Makan (1971)
- Muthalali (1965)
- Sabarimala Shri Ayyappan (1962)
- Devasundari (1957)
- Sthree (1950)
- Kettinethinu Vaasanathailam
- Urvashi Bharati

=== Acting ===
A full acting filmography list is available here.

==== 1950s ====
- Sthree (1950)
- Sasidharan (1950)
- Chandrika (1950)
- Navalokam (1951) as Kuruppu
- Jeevitha Nouka (1951) as Soman
- Visappinte Vili (1952)
- Andaman Kaithi (1952)
- Amma (1952)
- Achan (1952)
- Sheriyo Thetto (1953)
- Ponkathir (1953)
- Sneehaseema (1954)
- Puthradharmam (1954)
- Kidappadam (1954)
- Kalam Marunnu (1955)
- Harishchandra (1955)
- Atmarpanam (1956)
- Thaskaraveeran (1957)
- Devasundari (1957)
- Atchanum Makanum (1957)
- Randidangazhi (1958)
- Mariakutty (1958) as Pariyalle Kuruvachan
- Aana Valarthiyal Vanampady (1959)

==== 1960s ====
- Umma (1960) as Abobacker Haji
- Seeta (1960)
- Poothali (1960)
- Unniyarcha (1961) as Kannappa Chekavar
- Shri Sabarimalai Shri Ayyappan (1961)
- Kandam Bacha Kotte (1961) as Alikoya Haji
- Jnaanasundari (1961) as King Philip
- Christmas Rathri (1961) as George
- Bhakta Kuchela (1961) as Kamsan
- Viyarpintae Vila (1962)
- Velu Thampi Dhalava (1962)
- Snehadeepam (1962) as Sreedharan
- Shree Rama Pattabhishekam (1962)
- Shreekovil (1962)
- Sabarimalai Shri Ayyappan (1962)
- Laila Majnu (1962)
- Snapaka Yohannan (1963) as Herodias Anthippas
- Sathyabhama (1963)
- Nithya Kanyaka (1963)
- Kalayum Kaminiyum (1963)
- Doctor (1963) as Madhava Menon
- Chilamboli (1963)
- Thacholi Othenan (1964)
- Shree Guruvayoorappan (1964) as Villumangalam Swami
- School Master (1964) as Raman Pilla
- Omanakuttan (1964)
- Kudumbini (1964) as Raghava Kuruppu
- Karutha Kai (1964) as Thampi
- Kalanju Kittiya Thankam (1964) as Bhaskara Pilla
- Devaalayam (1964)
- Ayesha (1964)
- Atom Bomb (1964) as Kurungodu
- Shakuntala (1965)
- Rosy (1965)
- Odeyil Ninnu (1965) as Kuruppu
- Muthalali (1965)
- Mayavi (1965) as Krishna Menon
- Kochumon (1965)
- Kattu Pookkal (1965) as Thommachan
- Kathirunna Nikah (1965)
- Kaliyodum (1965)
- Jeevitha Yaathra (1965) as Parameshwara Kurup
- Inapravugal (1965)
- Chettathi (1965)
- Bhoomiyile Malakha (1965)
- Tilottama (1966)
- Tharavatamma (1966) as Keshavankutty
- Puthri (1966) as Kunjachan
- Priyathama (1966)
- Poocha Kanni (1966)
- Mayor Nair (1966)
- Kusruthy Kuttan (1966)
- Koottukar (1966)
- Kayamkulam Kochunni (1966) as Kunjunni Panikkar
- Karuna (1966)
- Kanmanikal (1966)
- Kanaka Chilanga (1966)
- Kallipennu (1966)
- Kadamattathachan (1966)
- Jail (1966)
- Iruttinde Athmavu (1966) as Karanavar
- Anarkali (1966) as Jaya Singhan
- Post Man (1967)
- Pareeksha (1967) as Janardhanan Pilla
- Naadan Pennu (1967)
- Iruttinte Athmavu (1967) as Madhavan Nair
- Madatharuvi (1967)
- Chitra Mela (1967) as (segment "Apaswarangal")
- Anveshichu Kandethiyilla (1967)
- Viruthan Shanku (1968)
- Vidyarthi (1968)
- Vazhi Pizhacha Santhathy (1968)
- Thulabharam (1968) as R.K.Menon
- Punnapra Vayalar (1968) as Maariyaveedan
- Manaswini (1968)
- Kodungalluramma (1968)
- Inspector (1968)
- Hotel High Range (1968) as Rajasahib
- Aparadhini (1968)
- Adyapika (1968)
- Poojapushpam (1969)
- Nurse (1969)
- Nadhi (1969) as Mattummel Thomachan
- Kumara Sambhavam (1969) as Himavat
- Chattambi Kavala (1969)
- Ballatha Pahayan (1969) as Beerankunju Hajiyar
- Aalmaram (1969)

==== 1970s ====
- Nilakkatha Chalanangal (1970)
- Vivaham Swargathil (1970)
- Triveni (1970) as Padmanabhan
- Thara as Keshavankutty Nair
- Saraswathi (1970)
- Sabarimala Shri Dharmasastha (1970)
- Palunkupathram (1970)
- Othenente Makan (1970)
- Nizhalattam (1970) as Karunakaran
- Nazhikakallu (1970)
- Ezhuthatha Katha (1970)
- Cross Belt (1970) as Krishnan Thampi
- Amma Enna Stree (1970)
- Puthanveedu (1971)
- Neethi (1971)
- Muthassi (1971)
- Lanka Dahanam (1971)
- Kalithozhi (1971)
- Achante Bharya (1971)
- Makane Ninakku Vendi (1971) as Mamachan
- Aana Valarthiyal Vanampadiyude Makan (1971)
- Aabhijathyam (1971) as Shankara Menon
- Prathikaram (1972) as Pankajakshan Nair
- Thavaputhalvan (1972)
- Swayamvaram (1972)
- Sree Guruvayoorappan (1972)
- Sakthi (1972)
- Professor (1972)
- Maya (1972) as Decent Sankara Pilla
- Maravil Thirivu Sookshikkuka (1972) as K. B. Menon
- Aromalunni (1972)
- Achanum Bappayum (1972)
- Aaradi Manninte Janmi (1972)
- Urvashi Bharathi (1973)
- Thiruvabharanam (1973)
- Thaniniram (1973) as Gopalan Master
- Swarga Puthri (1973) as Mathai
- Sasthram Jayichu Manushyan Thottu (1973) as Dr. Govinda Menon
- Preathangalude Thazhvaram (1973)
- Ponnapuram Kotta (1973)
- Padmavyooham (1973)
- Pacha Nottukal (1973)
- Nakhangal (1973)
- Kavitha (1973)
- Kattu Vitachavan (1973)
- Kaadu (1973/II) as Kattumooppan
- Jesus (1973)
- Divyadharsanam (1973)
- Chenda (1973)
- Angathattu (1973)
- Aasha Chakram (1973)
- Youvanam (1974)
- Vishnu Vijayam (1974)
- Thumbolarcha (1974) as Kannappa Chekavar
- Swarna Vigraham (1974)
- Suprabhatham (1974)
- Saptha Swarangal (1974) as Govinda Panikkar
- Pattabhisekam (1974)
- Pancha Thanthram (1974)
- Nellu (1974) as Chevara Perukki
- Nathoon (1974)
- Nagaram Sagaram (1974)
- Nadee Nadanmare Aavashyamunde (1974)
- Manyasree Viswamitran (1974)
- Devi Kanyakumari (1974)
- Check Post (1974)
- Ayalathe Sundari (1974)
- Thomashleeha (1975)
- Thiruvonam (1975)
- Swarna Matsyam (1975)
- Swami Ayyappan (1975)
- Soorya Vamsam (1975)
- Sathyathinte Nizhalil (1975)
- Sammanam (1975)
- Padmaragam (1975)
- Neela Ponman (1975) as Sankara Prabhu
- Mattoru Seetha (1975)
- Manishada (1975)
- Kottaram Vilakkanundu (1975)
- Kalayana Sougandhikam (1975)
- Dharmakshetre Kurukshetre (1975)
- Cheenavala (1975) as Rana
- Chattambikkalyaani (1975) as Daivam Mathai
- Bharya Illaatha Rathri (1975)
- Babu Mon (1975)
- Alibaba and Forty-one Thieves (1975) as Ameer
- Abhimanam (1975)
- Aaranya Kaandum (1975)
- Yaksha Gaanam (1976)
- Vazhi Vilakku (1976)
- Themmadi Vellappan (1976)
- Swimming Pool (1976)
- Sreemadh Bhagwad Geetha (1976)
- Sita Swayamvar (1976)
- Seemantha Puthran (1976)
- Sarvekkalu (1976)
- Romeo (1976)
- Rajanganam (1976)
- Mailanum Mathevanum (1976)
- Kayamkulam Kochunniyude Maghan (1976)
- Dheere Sameere Yamuna Theere (1976)
- Chirikudukka (1976) as Sadashivan Nair
- Chennai Valarthiya Kutty (1976)
- Appooppan (1976)
- Amrudha Vahini (1976) as Thampi
- Ammini Ammavan (1976)
- Amba Ambika Ambalika (1976)
- Abhinandanam (1976)
- Yatheem (1977) as Mammali Sayivu
- Vishukkani (1977)
- Thuruppu Gulam (1977)
- Soorya Kanthi (1977)
- Satyavan Savithri (1977)
- Saghakkale Munottu (1977)
- Rathi Manmathan (1977)
- Parivarthanam (1977)
- Niraparayum Nilavilakkum (1977)
- Mini Mol (1977)
- Manas Oru Mayil (1977)
- Kodiyettam (1977)
- Kavilamma (1977)
- Kannappanunni (1977) as Kannappan Chekavar
- Harsha Bhashpam (1977)
- Chathur Vedam (1977)
- Samudram (1977) as College Principal
- Aparadhi (1977)
- Aparaajitha (1977)
- Thacholy Ambu (1978)
- Sundharimarude Swapnangal (1978)
- Itha Oru Manushyan (1978)
- Society Lady (1978)
- Snehikkan Oru Pennu (1978)
- Manooradham (1978)
- Madhurikkunna Rathri (1978)
- Madanolsavam (1978) as Ambadi Rajasekharan Thampi
- Kanyaka (1978)
- Kanal Kattakal (1978) as Dr.Kumar
- Kalpa Vriksham (1978) as Sankaran Menon
- Kadathanattu Maakkam (1978)
- Jayikkanaayi Janichavan (1978)
- Chakrayudham (1978)
- Avar Jeevikkunnu (1978)
- Asthamayam (1978)
- Ashtamudi Kayal (1978)
- Vaaleduthaven Vaalaal (1979)
- Sayoojyam (1979)
- Puthiya Velicham (1979) as Lohithakshan Bhagavathar
- Pratheeksha (1979)
- Prabhatha Sandhya (1979)
- Ponnil Kulicha Rathri (1979)
- Pennorumbettaal (1979)
- Paapathinu Maranamilla (1979)
- Manushiyan (1979)
- Mamangam (1979) as King of Valluvanadu
- Iniyum Kaanaam (1979)
- Ini Ethra Sandhyakal (1979)
- Hridhayathinte Nirangal (1979)
- Allauddinum Albhutha Vilakkum (1979) as Shehan Sha
- Ajnatha Theerangal (1979)

==== 1980s ====
- Swathu (1980)
- Seetha (1980)
- Paallattu Kunjikannan (1980)
- Ambalavilakku (1980) as Ramavarmma
- Adhikaram (1980) as P.K.P
- Valarthu Mrigangal (1981) as Circus Owner Madhavan
- Thaalam Manasinte Thaalam (1981)
- Sanchari (1981)
- Grihalakshmi (1981)
- Padayottam (1982) as Kolathiri Rajavu
- Ithu Njangalude Katha (1982) as Ramankutty's Uncle
- Ithum Oru Jeevitham (1982)
- Ayudham (1982)
- Balooon (1982) as Aravindaksha Menon
- Ahagaaram (1983)
- Oru Sumangaliyude Katha (1984) as Yamuna's father
- Oru Nimisham Tharu (1984)
- Oodarathuammava Aalariyam (1984)
- Ivide Thudangunnu (1984) as Adv. Balachandra Menon
- Kudumbam Oru Swargam Bharya Oru Devatha (1984)
- Attahaasam (1984)
- Anakkorumma (1985) as Minister
- Ee Thalamura Ingane (1985)
- Azhiyatha Bandhangal (1985) as Thampi
- Sughamodevi (1986) as Sunny's Father
- Rareeram (1986) as Radha's Father
- Avanazhi (1986) as Nampoothiri
- Witness (1988) as Old Man
- Vellanakalude Nadu (1988) as Chandrashekharan Nair
- Oru Muthassi Katha (1988)
- Mukunthetta Sumitra Vilikkunnu (1988) as Menon
- Aryan (1988)
- Varavelpu (1989) as 'Apal bandavan' Govindan Nair
- Oru Sayahnathinte Swapnam (1989) as Govinda Pillai
- Innale (1989) as Ramachandran Nair
- Ardham (1989) as Janardanan's Father

==== 1990s ====
- Kuruppinte Kanakku Pustakom (1990) as Panikkar
- His Highness Abdullah (1990) as Mathilakathu Cheriyachan Thampuran
- Dr. Pasupathy (1990) as Pappan's grandfather
- Aye Auto (1990) as Krishna Pillai
- Arhatha (1990) as Ashwathi's grandfather
- Purappadu (1990)
- Nanma Niranjavan Sreenivasan (1990) as Madhavan Pillai
- Midhya (1990) as Grandfather
- Kizhakkunarum Pakshi (1991) as Moorthy
- Kalari (1991) as Ramesh and Rakesh's father
- Pookkalam Varavayi (1991) as Grandfather
- Kilukkam (1991) as Shop owner
- Advaitham (1992) as Parameswaran Namboothiri
- Kaazhchakkappuram (1992) as Paramu Pillai
- Midhunam (1993) as Kuruppu Master
- Akashadoothu (1993)
- Janam (1993) as old man
- Commissioner (1994) as Kunjurama Kuruppu
- Sadharam (1995)
- Indian Military Intelligence (1995)
- The King (1995)
- Mayooranritham (1996)
- Mahathma (1996)
- Kilukil Pambaramam (1997)
- Janadhipathyam (1997) as Maharaja

== Television ==
- Lubdhan Lukose (Doordarshan)
