= Gita Krishnankutty =

Indian Malayalam-English translator

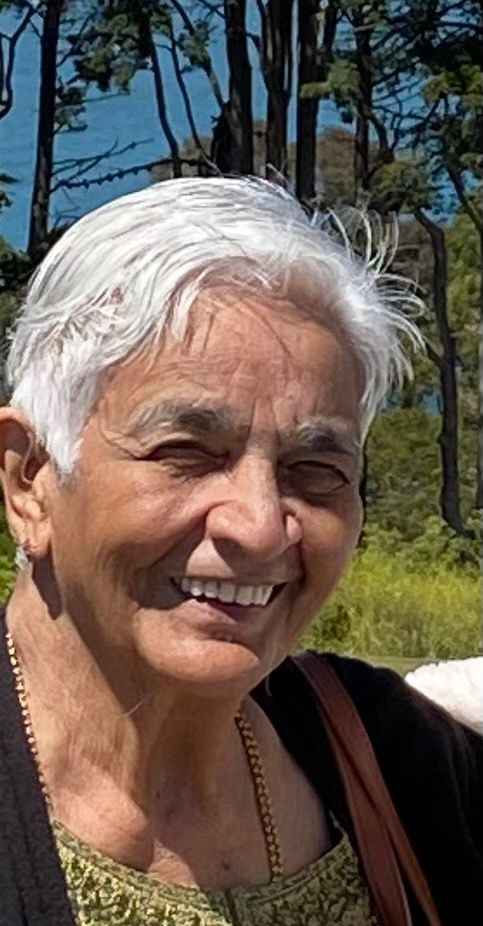
- Born: Chengammanad, Kerala
- Education: University of Mysore
- Occupation: Translator
- Writing career
- Notable awards: Sahitya Akademi Award; Kerala Sahitya Akademi Award for Overall Contributions; Crossword Book Award

Gita Krishnankutty is a Malayalam-English translator from Kerala, India. She has also written subtitles for many noted Malayalam films. She received many awards including Sahitya Akademi Award for Translation, Kerala Sahitya Akademi Award for Overall Contributions and Crossword Book Award for Translation.

== Biography ==
Gita Krishnankutty was born and raised in Chengammanad, near Aluva in Ernakulam district. Her father, who was from Palakkad, was an officer in the Madras Presidency Service. Her mother was from Chengamanad. Since her father got transferred every three years, she completed her studies in different places. After studying in Ooty and Coonoor, she also studied in Kozhikode for three years, when her father worked at the district hospital there.

At the age of nineteen, she got married and moved to Chennai. Her husband was a cardiologist practicing in Chennai. She stopped her studies upon marriage and later, after the age of thirty-seven, joined the University of Mysore for an M.A. in English Literature. She later earned her doctorate from the same University. Her chosen research topic was Comparative Literature. After receiving her doctorate, she joined Alliance Française, a Franco-Indian nonprofit association, to study French.

== Literary career ==
=== Translations ===
It was Susie Tharu who introduced Gita to translation literature. Tharu had decided to publish a two-volume book, 'Women Writing in India,' and sent a story by Rajalakshmi and a story by Lalithambika Antharjanam to be translated into it. Someone else had referred her to Tharu, who liked the translated stories and later asked if she could translate a few more stories by Lalithambika Antharjan. When she told her that she didn't have much experience in translation, Tharu said she could help with editing and proofreading. That's how her first published work, Cast Me Out If You Will was written. The book was published by Stree Publishers in Kolkata and Feminist Press in the US.

Later M.T. Vasudevan Nair's novel Kaalam was translated without his permission and sent to Vikas Publications, but they returned it saying it was too large. Later, M. T. learned about this from her, and when Orient Longman wrote to MT asking for permission to translate a book, he introduced the novel that Geeta had translated to them. Later, she translated many other famous novels by M.T.

=== Subtitling ===
Gita has also contributed to the field of cinema subtitling. P.K. Nair, who was the director of the Pune Film Archives, was the one who gave her initial help in subtitling. Gayatri Chatterjee taught her the basics of subtitling. She has subtitled many Malayalam films including 'Neelakuyil' directed by Ramu Kariat, 'Esthappan' by P. Bhaskaran, Aravindan's 'Kummatty', 'Amma Ariyan' by John Abraham and Shyamaprasad's 'Agnisakshi'.

== Translated works ==
English titles are given in bracket. Source:

- Anand's Marana Certificate (Death Certificate) (1983)
- M.T. Vasudevan Nair's novel Kaalam (Time)
- M.T's Nalukettu as Naalukettu: The House Around the Courtyard. Oxford University Press. 2008.
- M.T's Randamoozham as Bhima: The lone warrior. Harper Perennial. 2018.
- M.T's Manju (Mist)
- M.T's Iruttinte Athmav (The Soul of Darkness)
- Athmahathya (Suicide)
- Paul Zacharia's Bhaskara Patelarum mattu kathakalum (Bhaskara Patel and other stories)
- N. P. Mohammed's Daivathinte Kannu (The Eye of the God)
- M. Mukundan'sMayyazhi Puzhayute Theerangalil (On the Banks of Mayyazhi)
- Perumthachan (The Master Carpenter/Screenplay)
- Anand's Govardhante Yathrakal (Govardhan's Travel)
- Lalithambika Antharjanam's Kuttasammatham (Admission of Guilt)
- Bear With Me, Amma, first came out as Ammakku (For Mother), by M. T.
- M.T.'s Three Screenplays and their Stories: Nirmalyam, Oppol & Ennu Swantham Janakikutty
- WRITINGS OF M T VASUDEVAN NAIR. Orient Blackswan. 2018. ISBN 978-9352873609.
- Ambai: Novellas and Essays. Katha. 2002. ISBN 978-8185586953.
- A Life of Healing: A Biography of Vaidyaratnam P.S.Varier. Penguin India. 2001. ISBN 978-0670049158.
- Sketches: The Memoir of an Artist, English translation Artist Namboothiri's memoir, Sketches

== Awards and honors ==
- Sahitya Akademi Award for Translation in 1999, for the translation of Daivatthinte Kannu (God's Eye)
- Kerala Sahitya Akademi Award for Overall Contributions
- Crossword Book Award for Translation
- Abdulla memorial award for translation
- Katha Award
