= Asuravithu (1968 film) =

- Film poster
- Directed by: A. Vincent
- Written by: M. T. Vasudevan Nair
- Based on: Asuravithu by M. T. Vasudevan Nair
- Produced by: Madhavankutty
- Starring: Prem Nazir; Sharada; P. J. Antony
- Cinematography: A. Venkat
- Edited by: G. Venkitaraman
- Music by: K. Raghavan
- Production company: Manoj Pictures
- Release date: 17 May 1968
- Country: India
- Language: Malayalam

Asuravithu is a 1968 Indian Malayalam-language film directed by A. Vincent, starring Prem Nazir and Sharada. The film was scripted by M. T. Vasudevan Nair, based on his own novel Asuravithu. Set in a Kerala village in the 1960s, the political melodrama focuses on Hindu-Muslim unity. The film portrays the plight of the protagonist, the youngest son of a proud Nair tharavadu, as he is trapped between the social scenario, social injustice and his own inner consciousness. Prem Nazir's acting in the movie was well appreciated by the viewers.

The film was the last of M. T.'s trilogy of political melodramas – the other two being Vincent's Murappennu (1965) and P. Bhaskaran's Iruttinte Athmavu (1967).

== Plot ==
The rich Shekharan Nair tries to bribe his brother-in-law Govindankutty to marry his daughter Meenakshi. The reason for this haste is that Meenakshi is pregnant by Govindankutty's wayward nephew. Govindankutty, however refuses and is thrown out by the family. He moves in with his Muslim friend Kunjarakkar, a daring thing to do, given the prevailing socio-political atmosphere. He eventually converts to Islam, renaming himself Abdullah.

== Cast ==
- Prem Nazir as Govindankutty
- Sharada as Meenakshi
- P. J. Antony as Kunjarakkar
- Sankaradi as Shekharan Nair
- N. Govindankutty as Kumaran
- Santha Devi as Madhavi
- Kaviyoor Ponnamma as Kunjootty
- Adoor Bhasi as Kuttan Nair
- Kalamandalam Kalyanikutty Amma
- Khadeeja as Nabeesu
- Rajan
- Saraswathi as Rajamma
- Nilambur Balan
- Kedamangalam Ali

== Production ==
The film was produced by Madhavankutty under the banner of Manoj Pictures. An adaptation of the famous novel of the same name, the script and dialogues were by the novelist himself. The Valluvanadan dialect popular in villages on the banks of the Bharathappuzha River was effectively used in the film. The film was shot at Vauhini and Satya studios, while some of the outdoor scenes were shot on the banks of Bharathappuzha.

== Soundtrack ==
The music was composed by K. Raghavan and the lyrics were written by P. Bhaskaran.

No.	Song	Singers	Lyrics	Length (m:ss)
1	"Kattakattakkayarittu"	S. Janaki, Chorus		
2	"Kunkuma Maram Vetti"	P. Leela, C. O. Anto		
3	"Kunnathoru Kaavundu"	P. Leela, C. O. Anto		
4	"Njanitha"	P. Jayachandran, Renuka	P. Bhaskaran	
5	"Pakalavaninnu"	K. Raghavan	P. Bhaskaran	
6	"Theyyam Thaare" (Kunnum Molile)	Chorus, Renuka		
7	"Theyyam Theyyam"	C. O. Anto		
