= Neelathamara (1979 film) =

1979 film by Yusufali Kechery

- Directed by: Yusuf Ali Kechery
- Written by: M. T. Vasudevan Nair
- Produced by: Abbas
- Starring: Ambika; Ravikumar; Sathar; Bahadoor; Kuthiravattom Pappu; Adoor Bhavani; Kozhikode Santha Devi; Bhavani
- Music by: Devarajan
- Production company: Charisma Films
- Release date: 4 May 1979
- Country: India
- Language: Malayalam
- Budget: ₹ 5 lakhs

Neelathamara (transl. Blue Lotus) is a 1979 Malayalam language romance film directed by Yusuf Ali Kechery and written by M. T. Vasudevan Nair. Produced on a small budget of ₹500,000, the film stars Ambika and Ravikumar in the lead roles. The film deals with the romance between a housemaid and her employer. The film was remade in 2009 by Lal Jose with the same title.

== Plot ==
The widow Malooty Amma lives peacefully in her house. Her son Haridasan is studying in town. Achuthan Nair is a steward to her house. Malootty Amma is quiet aged and unable to manage the household work on her own. She asks Nair to find her a housemaid. She has a little caste bias, but the difficulty of getting a maid these days forces her to accept anybody who is out of her caste. One day a poor girl, Kunjumalu, and her grandmother come to 'Kizhakkampattu' Malootty Amma's house. On their way they hear a beautiful humming which is later revealed as a musician's near the temple. When they reach 'Kizahkkampattu' her grandma reveals to Malootty Amma that they are a different caste or family named 'Veluthedathu'.

The girl soon gets acquainted with the duties of the house and she gains the appeal of Malootty Amma. Kunjimalu, the maid befriends a girl named Ammini and they maintain a good friendship. Ammini has some mysterious problems which are not explained overtly. Anyway, she talks elaborately about her sister's husband and their children at home. One day Haridasan returns home. He soon gets attracted to the housemaid Kunjimalu. One day he asks her to come to his room in night. She has an inner torment whether to follow the words of her employer (Haridas). But after she puts money in the holy steps of the temple and pray to show her a sign whether to follow his words by blooming the Blue Lotus of the pond, she decides to go to her room. And the two have a romantic and physical relationship.

Kunjimalu prays to show the sign of Blue Lotus when she hears he is going to attend an interview. In all of these pleasant occasions a beautiful humming of the musician is heard, but he never appears. Haridas then gets a job in town. In a letter sent by Haridas after some days he coolly asks about the wellbeing of the family members and informs about his stay there. This letter is later read by Kunjimalu who is in bereavement after Haridas left. She is disappointed to find not a single word is written about her. But she consoles herself with the belief that Haridas will not be able to enquire about her since she is just a maid. Later plans for Haridas' marriage go on. They find an alignment with Haridas' cousin Ratnam.

Kunjimalu is quiet worried and is sad but she goes on with her chores. After this she learns that the musician lost his sound from a man who sits under the banyan tree near the temple. Haridas later visits his cousin Ratnam's house and stays a night there. That night, just like that is with Kunjimalu he tries to make Ratnam come to his room. But she rejects the idea telling that it will not be good for them to have physical relationship before the marriage. Their marriage takes place and Kunjimalu understands Haridasan was cheating her. On the first night Kunjimalu tells Ratnam things to take care in their (Haridasan and Ratnam's) room including the creaking sound in one of the steps to his room. Ratnam becomes suspicious about Kunjimalu's concern for him. She then finds some letters and notes written by Haridas and one of his photos in Kunjimalu's belongings.

She asks Kunjimalu to come with them to their rented house in town. Haridas who has a difficulty of meeting Kunjimalu after the marriage rejects his wife's idea. She then questions her husband and she is now sure that her husband Haridas had relationship of all means with Kunjimalu. But surprisingly Ratnam is sympathetic toward Kunjimalu. Next day Malootty Amma asks Kunjimalu to leave her house. After that day they find she is not at house. They are a little worried now. News arrives that a body has been found near the temple pond. Everyone worries that it will be Kunjimalu's. Ratnam blames Haridas for what might have happened. Haridas goes to the spot and finds that it was not Kunjimalu's body but her friend Ammini's.

He comes home. Next day they plan to leave house and Ratnam bid farewell Kunjimalu. In the end Kunjimalu is taken back home by her cousin who was going to marry her and who knows much of the story between Haridas and his cousin. On their way back, near the river they meet two people who ask them the way to 'Padinjattu' for sending the younger girl as a servant there. At this question Kunjimalu and her cousin look at each other. The word "End" appears on the screen, and later, "But there is no End".

== Production ==
- The film was produced by Abbas under the banner of Charisma Films.
- The budget of the film was just ₹ 5 lakhs.
- The film was shot at Koodalloor, Anakkara and Thrithala.
- Principal production was completed in a single schedule in 18 days.
- Jayabharathi was initially approached for the heroine role.

== Cast ==
- Ambika as Kunjimalu (New Film - Archana Jose Kavi)
- Ravikumar as Haridas (New Film - Kailash)
- Bhavani as Ratnam (New Film - Samvrutha Sunil)
- Sathaar as Appu (New Film - Suresh Nair)
- Jayaragini as Amminikutty (New Film - Rima Kallingal)
- Kozhikode Santha Devi as Maluamma (New Film - Sreedevi Unni)
- Bahadoor as Achuthan Nair (New Film - Joy Mathai)
- Adoor Bhavani as Sharathe Amma
- Kuthiravattom Pappu as Sankarankutty Menon
