= Kerala State Film Award for Best Screenplay =

Annual Indian film award

The Kerala State Film Award for Best Screenplay winners:

*	Indicates the Award for Best Adapted Screenplay

Year	Winner	Film name	Director
1969	K. T. Muhammed	Kadalpalam	K. S. Sethumadhavan
1970	M.T. Vasudevan Nair	Olavum Theeravum	P. N. Menon
1971	S. L. Puram Sadanandan	Oru Penninte Katha	K. S. Sethumadhavan
1972	K. T. Muhammed	Achanum Bappayum	K. S. Sethumadhavan
1973	M. T. Vasudevan Nair	Nirmalyam	M. T. Vasudevan Nair
1974	Thikkodiyan, G. Aravindan	Uttarayanam	G. Aravindan
1975	Pamman, K. G. George	Swapnadanam	K. G. George
1976	P. A. Backer	Manimuzhakkam	P. A. Backer
1977	Adoor Gopalakrishnan	Kodiyettam	Adoor Gopalakrishnan
1978	Padmarajan	Rappadikalude Gatha	K. G. George
1979	Padmarajan	Peruvazhiyambalam	Padmarajan
1980	M.T. Vasudevan Nair	Oppol	K. S. Sethumadhavan
1981	M.T. Vasudevan Nair	Valarthumrugangal, Thrishna	Hariharan, I. V. Sasi
1982	K. G. George, S. L. Puram Sadanandan	Yavanika	K. G. George
1983	K. G. George, Kallikkadu Ramachandran	Aadaminte Vaariyellu	K. G. George
1984	Padmarajan	Kanamarayathu	I. V. Sasi
1985	K. G. George	Irakal	K. G. George
1986	M. T. Vasudevan Nair	Nakhakshathangal	Hariharan
1987	M. T. Vasudevan Nair	Amrutham Gamaya	Hariharan
1988	Padmarajan	Aparan	Padmarajan
1989	M. T. Vasudevan Nair	Oru Vadakkan Veeragatha	Hariharan
1990	M. T. Vasudevan Nair	Perumthachan	Ajayan
1991	M. T. Vasudevan Nair	Kadavu	M. T. Vasudevan Nair
1992	Kaloor Dennis	Kudumbasametham	Jayaraj
1993	Adoor Gopalakrishnan	Vidheyan	Adoor Gopalakrishnan
1994	M. T. Vasudevan Nair	Parinayam	Hariharan
1995	Sreenivasan	Mazhayethum Munpe	Kamal
1996	T. A. Razzaq	Kanakkinavu	Sibi Malayil
1997	Lohithadas	Bhoothakkannadi	Lohithadas
1998	M. T. Vasudevan Nair	Daya	Venu
1999	B. Unnikrishnan, T. K. Rajeev Kumar	Jalamarmaram	T. K. Rajeev Kumar
2000	M. P. Sukumaran Nair	Shayanam	M. P. Sukumaran Nair
2001	Kamal	Meghamalhar	Kamal
2002	No award		
2003	Rajiv Vijayaraghavan, S. P. Ramesh, Anwar Ali	Margam	Rajiv Vigayaraghavan
2004	T. V. Chandran	Kathavasheshan	T. V. Chandran
2005	Blessy	Thanmathra	Blessy
2006	Major Ravi	Keerthi Chakra	Major Ravi
2007	Sathyan Anthikkad	Vinodayathra	Sathyan Anthikkad
2008	Adoor Gopalakrishnan	Oru Pennum Randaanum	Adoor Gopalakrishnan
2009	M. T. Vasudevan Nair	Kerala Varma Pazhassi Raja	Hariharan
2010	Salim Ahamed	Adaminte Makan Abu	Salim Ahamed
2011	Bobby-Sanjay	Traffic	Rajesh Pillai
2012	Anjali Menon	Ustad Hotel	Anwar Rasheed
2013	Bobby-Sanjay	Mumbai Police	Rosshan Andrrews
2014	Anjali Menon	Bangalore Days	Anjali Menon
2014	Ranjith	Njaan	Ranjith
2015	Unni R., Martin Prakkat	Charlie	Martin Prakkat
2015	Razi Muhammed	Velutha Rathrikal	Razi Muhammed
2016	Syam Pushkaran	Maheshinte Prathikaaram	Dileesh Pothan
2017	Sajeev Pazhoor	Thondimuthalum Driksakshiyum	Dileesh Pothan
2017	S. Hareesh, Sanju Surendran	Aedan: Garden of Desire	Sanju Surendran
2018	Zakariya Mohammed, Muhsin Parari	Sudani From Nigeria	Zakariya Mohammed
2019	Shinos Rahman, Sajas Rahman	Vasanthi	Shinos Rahman, Sajas Rahman
2019	P. S. Rafeeque	Thottappan	Shanavas K Bavakutty
2020	Jeo Baby	The Great Indian Kitchen	Jeo Baby
2021	Krishand R.K	Aavasavyuham	Krishand R.K
2021	Syam Pushkaran	Joji	Dileesh Pothan
2022	Ratheesh Balakrishnan Poduval	Nna Thaan Case Kodu	Ratheesh Balakrishnan Poduval
2022	Rajesh Pinnadan	Oru Thekkan Thallu Case	Sreejith N.
2023	Rohit M. G. Krishnan	Iratta	Rohit M. G. Krishhnan
2023	Blessy	The Goat Life	Blessy
2024	Chidambaram S. Poduval	Manjummel Boys	Chidambaram S. Poduval
2024	Lajo Jose	Bougainvillea	Amal Neerad
