= Bandhanam =

1978 film

- Directed by: M. T. Vasudevan Nair
- Written by: M. T. Vasudevan Nair
- Screenplay by: M. T. Vasudevan Nair
- Produced by: V. B. K. Menon P.K.Bhaskaran Nair
- Starring: Shobha; Sukumaran; Sankaradi; Shubha
- Cinematography: Ramachandra Babu
- Edited by: G. Venkittaraman
- Music by: M. B. Sreenivasan
- Production company: Marunadan Movies
- Distributed by: Marunadan Movies
- Release date: 1 December 1978
- Country: India
- Language: Malayalam

Bandhanam (English: Bondage) is a 1978 Indian Malayalam film, written and directed by M. T. Vasudevan Nair and produced by V. B. K. Menon and P.K.Bhaskaran Nair. The film stars Shobha, Sukumaran, Sankaradi and Shubha in the lead roles. The film has musical score by M. B. Sreenivasan. The film observes a young man's return from city living to the village. The film's mood is sorrowful. He leads a very wayward life and tries not to get himself attached to family ties but eventually gets drawn into the bondage of relationships and family by his step-sister.

The title of the film literally translates to "bondage". The title is taken from a short story of the same name by MT although the film is not an adaptation the story.

== Plot ==
Unnikrishnan works as clerk in the city. He leads an aimless life spending his evenings drinking and nights in a budget lodge. His colleague Sarojini has feelings for him. Though Unnikrishnan reciprocates the feelings, he fails to express them to her.

Unnikrishnan receives a mail from his estranged stepmother which prompts him to take a month's leave and go back to his village. He meets his stepmother and half-sister Thankam, who are financially struggling. Unnikrishnan arranges a suitable wedding for Thankam. After the wedding, he decides to go back to the city and propose to Sarojini, but he receives Sarojini's wedding invitation at the same time. The story ends with Unnikrishnan deciding to continue his lonely life.

== Cast ==
- Shobha as Thankam
- Sukumaran as Unnikrishnan
- Sankaradi as Achummaan
- Shubha as Sarojini
- Nilambur Balan as Kaaranavar
- Janardanan
- Kunchan
- Kunjandi as Sankara Menon
- P. K. Abraham
- Santhakumari as Office Colleague
- Thrissur Elsy as Ammini
- Veeran

== Soundtrack ==
The music was composed by M. B. Sreenivasan and the lyrics was written by O. N. V. Kurup.

No.	Song	Singers	Lyrics	Length (m:ss)
1	"Kani Kaanenam"	Leela Menon	O. N. V. Kurup	
2	"Raagam Sreeragam"	P. Jayachandran	O. N. V. Kurup	
3	"Raagam Sreeragam"	Vani Jairam, Leela Menon	O. N. V. Kurup	
