= Nirmalyam =

1973 film by M. T. Vasudevan Nair

- Poster
- Directed by: M. T. Vasudevan Nair
- Written by: M. T. Vasudevan Nair
- Based on: Pallivalum Kalchilambum by M. T. Vasudevan Nair
- Produced by: M. T. Vasudevan Nair
- Starring: P. J. Antony; Sumithra; Ravi Menon
- Cinematography: Ramachandra Babu
- Edited by: Ravi
- Music by: Original Songs: K. Raghavan; Original Score: M. B. Sreenivasan
- Production company: Novel Films
- Distributed by: Novel Films
- Release date: 23 November 1973
- Running time: 134 minutes
- Country: India
- Language: Malayalam

Nirmalyam (transl. "Remains" or "Yesterday's Offerings") is a 1973 Indian Malayalam-language film written and directed by M. T. Vasudevan Nair in his directorial debut. It stars P. J. Antony, Sumithra, and Ravi Menon. P. J. Antony won the National Film Award for Best Actor in 1974 for his performance as a velichappadu (an oracle or a medium between the Goddess and the worshipper in a Hindu temple) in this movie. The film received the National Film Award for Best Feature Film and Kerala State Film Award for Best Film in 1974. It is one of the classics in Malayalam cinema. The film was based on M. T. Vasudevan Nair's short story Pallivaalum Kaalchilambum.

The film marked the actor Sukumaran's debut and was the second movie of Ravi Menon who had earlier acted in a Hindi movie. It became a breakthrough in Menon and Sumithra's acting careers.

The movie is an adaptation of the short story "Pallivalum Kalchilambum" by Vasudevan Nair.

== Plot ==
The movie revolves around a neglected temple and the people dependent on it. P. J. Antony (Velichappadu or oracle) is the caretaker of the temple. The Velichapadu's wife, Narayani, runs the household with the meager income from the temple. His son, Appu, is educated but unemployed, and as a result, he loses faith in the temple and goddess. Velcihapadu's daughter, Ammini, helps him in temple rituals. The priest quits and starts a tea shop. A new priest, Brahmadattan Nambothiri, from the neighboring village now takes care of the temple. He is eager to get a government job as his situation at home is not good and his younger sisters are not yet married. He seduces Ammini, daughter of Velichapdu, and leaves the village. Because of extreme poverty, Velichapdu starts to beg. One day, his son, Appu, tries to sell the holy sword to a pawn seller and Velichapadu finds it. He asks Appu to leave the house immediately.

Meanwhile, there is a smallpox outbreak in the village, and the first person affected is Variyar's wife. Due to the outbreak of the disease, people become serious about the temple and its rituals. The villagers decide to conduct the festival for the Goddess and started collecting money from all. On the day of the festival, Velichapadu finds that his wife is having sex with a local moneylender for a living, leaving him totally devastated. The film ends with a devastating scene. The oracle dances before the goddess, and strikes his forehead with the sacred sword, till he falls down dead.

== Cast ==
- P. J. Antony as Velichappad (Oracle)
- Sumithra as Velichapad's daughter Ammini
- Ravi Menon as Brahmadathan Namboothiri, the temple priest
- Kaviyoor Ponnamma as Velichapad's wife Narayani
- Sukumaran as Velichapad's son Appu
- Kunjandi as the local Muslim money lender
- Sankaradi as Ravunni Nair
- Shantha Devi
- Kottarakkara Sreedharan Nair as Valiya Thamburan
- M. S. Namboothiri
- S. P. Pillai

== Production ==
=== Casting ===
According to Nair, casting was done "against everyone else's suggestion". Veteran actor Sankaradi was recommended for role of Velichapad by several crew members, however, other members of the crew opposed the proposal saying that his physique wouldn't suit the role. Nair was looking for a man who looked "skinny and weak." Nair himself suggested P. J. Antony for the role and met him. On their first meeting, Antony turned down role saying that he wasn't doing any films and was fully focused on theater. However, afterwards Antony sent a letter to Nair accepting the role. When P.J.Antony came to the location he didn't have much idea about his character. So he requested Nair to get the services of the local Velichappad, gave him Guru Dhakshina and learnt from him the steps and mannerism of temple performances. Cinematographer Ramachandra Babu wrote in his blog, "He [Antony] observed him minutely and succeeded in bringing alive on screen the Velichappad."

Ramachandra Babu had met M. T. Vasudevan Nair for the first time in 1970, while a student at the Poona Film Institute. He had been there as visiting Professor to take Screenplay classes. Following that, he met Nair twice in Madras. Prior to Nirmalayam, Babu had only done three films. When he was contacted by Nair to be the cinematographer he was "taken aback." Nair explained that he didn't want any famous people associated with the film as they might get attributed for the film's success. He also said that "the film should be done in his own way, whether correct or not without any kind of interference."

The film marked the debut of M. T. Vasudevan Nair as director and also, Sukumaran and Sumithra as actors. During his tenure teaching English at Scott Christian College in Nagercoil, Tamil Nadu, Sukumaran got an offer to act in the film. It marks the second film of Ravi Menon who acted earlier in a Hindi film. This film was a breakthrough in Ravi Menon's acting career. Ramachandra Babu, M. Azad (an associate director) and Ravi Menon were batchmates at the Poona Film Institute.

=== Filming ===
There was full co-operation from the villagers and they always were there to help us with properties for the scenes and also acting in minor and crowd scenes. In fact, they got so attached to the unit, many children were in tears when it was time for us to depart after the shooting was over.

— Ramachandra Babu about the residents of Mukkola village.

The film's major shooting location was a small village near Edappal called Mukkola (Mukuthala). The film was produced by M. T. Vasudevan Nair under the banner of Novel Films. There were no lodges in the area to accommodate the crew members. Actor Sukumaran's uncle, Edappal Kuttan made arrangements in his relative's houses for Kaviyoor Ponnamma, Sumithra etc. to stay. The rest of the crew were accommodated in a hall that belonged to a rice mill in Edappal. The mill had two rooms, which were taken by Nair and Antony. The rest of the crew were accommodated in the hall.

During filming the crew faced several challenges with power supply. Since, they did not have generators for power supply, they had to depend on KSEB. For power they needed Temporary 3 phase connections with separate meters in all locations where power is needed. However, they only needed power in two locations only, the Temple and velichappad's house which happened to be near the temple. So they managed with one connection for both the locations. However, the power situation was worse in Malabar area and the voltage was very less at night time (around 120-150 volts). So most of the night shooting was done after 9 PM only when people switch off the lights and go to sleep. Then the power consumption load goes down and the voltage rises to a usable level of around 200 volts. Due to this, night shoots use to extend till early mornings. For daytime shooting the crew used reflectors which was fabricated at Calicut, since they did not have a full out-door unit from Madras for use.

The main location, the Temple was in a neglected state without any puja or rituals being done for a long time. The crew came to know that a few people in the village thought that a non Hindu, Christian P.J Antony should not enter the temple. M.T. planned to finish all the exterior scenes including the climax and kept the temple interior scenes involving P. J. Antony at the end of the schedule, In case any strong objection arises at that time.

— Ramachandra Babu about his experiences while shooting in the temple

Towards the end of the shooting schedule M.T. Vasudevan Nair ran out of money and the crew still had to shoot the climax and other scenes. He discussed the situation with a few trusted friends and sent a messenger to Shoranur, where A. Vincent was shooting for a film, to lend him some money. Vincent sent Nair thousand feet of film. It was difficult for the crew to obtain funds from the villagers, as they had already taken money from three well-to-do houses. However, during shooting a few of Nair's well to do friends came to visit him. Nair asked them for five thousand rupees, however, they gave him ten thousand and left.

Except for the Sreekovil portion all other scenes were completed in one schedule. The crew had erected a set in Calicut where the Sreekovil with the idol where close up shots were taken. This was done because in the temple which was used for shooting there were no regular Poojas taking place and also the size of the temple and customs prevented the crew from entering it too for placing lights. For other outdoor locations, the crew used the steps on the riverside at Thirumittakode temple for the parting song and a cave nearby for the rain sequence which was done with the help of fire engines.

== Soundtrack ==
The songs were composed by K. Raghavan. Poems written by Swathi Thirunal and Edasseri were used in the film. Background music was composed by M. B. Sreenivasan

Song	Playback singers	Lyrics	Duration
"Panimathimukhi Bal.."	K. P. Brahmanandan, Sukumari Narendra Menon	Swathi Thirunal	
"Thinthanam Tharo.."	Sukumari Narendra Menon, Padmini	Edasseri	
"Samayamay.."	K. P. Brahmanandan, L. R. Anjali	Edasseri	
"Sreemahadevan Thante.."	K. P. Brahmanandan, Padmini	Edasseri	

== Awards ==
- National Film Award for Best Feature Film
- National Film Award for Best Actor - P. J. Antony
- Kerala State Film Award for Best Film
- Kerala State Film Award for Best Actor - P. J. Antony
- Kerala State Film Award for Best Editor
- Kerala State Film Award for Best Screenplay
