= Iruttinte Athmavu =

- Directed by: P. Bhaskaran
- Written by: M. T. Vasudevan Nair
- Produced by: P. I. Muhammed Kasim
- Starring: Prem Nazir, Sharada, Thikkurissy Sukumaran Nair, P. J. Antony, Ushakumari/Vennira Aadai Nirmala, Kozhikode Shantha Devi, Baby Rajani
- Cinematography: E. N. Balakrishnan
- Edited by: G. Venkitaraman , Das
- Music by: M. S. Baburaj
- Production company: Sony Pictures
- Distributed by: Bharath Pictures
- Release date: 2 March 1967
- Country: India
- Language: Malayalam

Iruttinte Athmavu (transl. The soul of Darkness) is a 1967 Indian Malayalam-language film directed by P. Bhaskaran and written by M. T. Vasudevan Nair, based on his own short story of the same name. It stars Prem Nazir and Sharada in lead roles with Thikkurissy Sukumaran Nair, P. J. Antony, Ushakumari, Kozhikode Shantha Devi and Baby Rajani in supporting roles. The film is about a mentally unstable youth born into a matriarchal family who is kept in chains and is misunderstood and ill-treated by everyone except his uncle's daughter. The film features music by M. S. Baburaj, cinematography by E. N. Balakrishnan and editing by G. Venkitaraman and Das.

Prem Nazir played the mentally challenged Bhranthan Velayudhan, widely considered to be one of the finest performances of his career. Nazir himself rated his role in Iruttinte Athmavu and as the swashbuckling folk hero Thampan in Padayottam as his best. Also, its script is regarded as one of the finest by M. T. Vasudevan Nair. A landmark film in Malayalam cinema, the film provided Malayalam cinema with a new direction; that of the low-budget film. The film has earned a dedicated cult following. It won the National Film Award for Best Film on Other Social Issues. It missed the Best Film and Best Actor (Prem Nazir) award only narrowly. Despite all the acclaim, the film was a box office failure.

The film was part of MT's trilogy of political melodramas – the other two being Murappennu (1965) and Asuravithu (1968), both directed by A. Vincent. Major indoor parts of the film were shot in Satya Studios in Madras and outdoor parts from the premises of Bharathapuzha at Shoranur.

== Cast ==
- Prem Nazir as Bhranthan Velayudhan
- Thikkurissy Sukumaran Nair as Madhavan Nair (Karanavar)
- P. J. Antony as Gopalan Nair
- M. S. Nampoothiri as Muthachan (grandfather)
- T. S. Muthaiah as Rajan
- K. Balaji as Chandran
- Sankaradi as Achuthan Nair (house servant)
- Adoor Bhasi as Guru Kunhichathu
- Kaduvakulam Antony as Jyotsyan (astrologist)
- Baby Rajani as Unni
- Sharada as Ammukutty
- Ushakumari/Vennira Aadai Nirmala as Prema
- Kozhikode Shantha Devi as Parukkutty Amma (Velayudhan's mother)
- Philomina as Meenakshi Amma
- Padmini as Nani
- Shobha as Malini
- Seleena as Neeli
- Rugmini as Karthi

== Soundtrack ==
The music was composed by M. S. Baburaj and the lyrics were written by P. Bhaskaran. All songs in the film were sung by S. Janaki, which is a landmark.

No.	Song	Singers	Lyrics	Length (m:ss)
1	"Ambaadikannanu Mampazham"	S. Janaki	P. Bhaskaran	
2	"Eeranuduthukondambaram"	S. Janaki	P. Bhaskaran	
3	"Irukanneerthullikal"	S. Janaki	P. Bhaskaran	
4	"Vaakachaarthu Kazhinjoru"	S. Janaki	P. Bhaskaran	

== Writing ==
The film is scripted by M. T. Vasudevan Nair based on his own a short story with the same name. The screenplay is regarded as one of the finest by the noted writer. A part of the screenplay of Iruttinte Athmavu is being taught in school classes while the complete screenplay is being taught at degree level.

== Legacy ==
The film is considered one of the best Malayalam films ever made, it is still critically acclaimed even 50 years after its release. The film remains one of the most influential films in Malayalam film history.
