= Manju (film) =

- Directed by: M. T. Vasudevan Nair
- Screenplay by: M. T. Vasudevan Nair
- Based on: Manju by M. T. Vasudevan Nair
- Produced by: K. Ravindran Nair
- Starring: Sangeeta Naik; Nanditha Bose; Indira; Sankar Mohan; Desh Maheshwari
- Cinematography: Shaji N. Karun
- Edited by: Rameshan
- Music by: M. B. Sreenivasan
- Production company: General Pictures
- Release date: 9 December 1983
- Country: India
- Languages: Malayalam; Hindi

Manju (English: The Mist) is a 1983 Malayalam film based on the novel of the same name by M. T. Vasudevan Nair. The film was scripted and directed by Nair himself and stars Sangeeta Naik, Nanditha Bose, Indira, Sankar Mohan and Desh Maheshwari.

== Plot ==
Set in Nainital, Manju is about Vimala Devi, a teacher in a boarding school, who waits in hope for the winter of her discontent to end. Another important character is Buddhu, who waits for his Englishman father to return to Nainital. Loneliness and endless waiting are recurring motifs in the film.

== Cast ==
- Sangeeta Naik as Vimala
- Nanditha Bose as Mother
- Indira as Younger Sister
- Kalpana as Rashmi
- Shankar Mohan as Sudheer
- C. S. Dubey as Amar Singh
- Desh Maheshwari as Budhu
- Dinesh Thakur as Sardarji

== Soundtrack ==
The music was composed by M. B. Sreenivasan and the lyrics were written by Gulzar. All the songs are in Hindi as the film is completely set in Nainital.

No.	Song	Singers	Lyrics	Length (m:ss)
1	"Apooni" (Bit)		Gulzar	
2	"Hariyare" (Bit)		Gulzar	
3	"Oh Bageere" (Bit)		Gulzar	
4	"Rasiya" (No BGM)	Bhupinder	Gulzar	
5	"Rasiya" (Version II)	Bhupinder	Gulzar	
6	"Rasiya Man"	Bhupinder	Gulzar	
7	"Sajeeli Doliyan" (Bit)		Gulzar	
8	"Vadasi Yadi"	Usha Ravi		

== Hindi version ==
The novel also had a Hindi-language film adaptation titled Sarath Sandhya.
