= Anubandham (1985 film) =

1985 film

- Poster designed by P. N. Menon
- Directed by: I. V. Sasi
- Written by: M. T. Vasudevan Nair
- Produced by: Raju Mathew
- Starring: Mammootty; Mohanlal; Seema; Shobana
- Cinematography: Jayanan Vincent
- Edited by: K. Narayanan
- Music by: Shyam
- Production company: Century Films
- Distributed by: Century Release
- Release date: 29 March 1985
- Running time: 120 minutes
- Country: India
- Language: Malayalam

Anubandham (transl. Relation) is a 1985 Indian Malayalam-language drama film written by M. T. Vasudevan Nair and directed by I. V. Sasi. It stars Mammootty, Mohanlal, Seema, and Shobana. The film won four Kerala State Film Awards—Best Story (M. T. Vasudevan Nair), Best Actress (Seema), Best Child Artist (Vimal), and Best Editor (K. Narayanan).

== Plot ==
A widow, Sunandha (Seema), lives in difficult circumstances with her young son, Hari, and may have to leave their home.

Muraleedhran Master (Mammootty), having recently moved to town for work, and looking for a place to stay, is pleasantly surprised to see Sunandha 12 years after having taught her in college but is sad to hear of her situation.

Bhaskaran (Mohanlal), a bank manager from a modest background, and Vijayalakshmi (Shobhana), from a wealthy family, live with their young son, Jayan, in the neighbourhood. Vijayalakshmi struggles to adapt a middle-class, small-town life which results in some tension and conflict at home.

Receiving no aid from her late husband's family and needing to earn a living, Sunandha starts a kindergarten with the help of Murali. She shows herself to be intelligent and capable and up to the task.

Sunandha's landlord (Thilakan) and landlady (Sukumari) and other townsfolk fuel gossip about Sunandha and Murali which bothers Hari. Murali and Sunandha are interested in marrying each other at some stage, but Hari's anger and objections give Sunandha pause.

When Hari plays with the kindergarten bus, it results in the accidental death of Jayan who attends the kindergarten. After the funeral, the townsfolk and Police consider the legal implications of such a shocking accident. Murali is concerned about Hari's psychological state, guilt and shock about the situation, while Bhaskaran, Vijayalakshmi and Sunandha struggle with the terrible senseless tragedy.

Murali urges Sunandha to reopen the kindergarten and encourages and reassures Hari that he needs to return to school. The townsfolk and school teacher make cruel and humiliating remarks to Hari and no one wants to send their kids to Sunandha's kindergarten.

Murali takes them out of town for the day. The next day before school Hari goes apologizes to Vijayalakshmi who shows a previously absent graciousness and tenderness. She helps Sunandha to restart the kindergarten as life returns to some normalcy.

Murali feels it is best for him to move away while things are peaceful. When Hari finds out Masha is leaving he asks if it's because Masha is angry at him and Sunandha. He runs and begs Masha to return.

== Cast ==
- Mammootty as Muraleedharan Master
- Mohanlal as Bhaskaran
- Seema as Sunanda
- Shobana as Vijayalakshmi
- Master Vimal as Harimon
- Master Prasobh as Jayan
- Thilakan as Menon
- Sukumari as Malu
- Kunchan as Krishnankutty
- Sankaradi as Joseph
- Premji as Valiya Nampoothiri
- Jagannatha Varma as Bhaskaran's Father
- Paravoor Bharathan as Rtd Judge (Vijayalakshmi's Father)
- Bahadoor as Madhavan
- Kunjandi as Hydrose
- Janardhanan as Police Officer
- Thodupuzha Vasanthi as Sunanda’s sister-in-law
- Kozhikode Shantha Devi as Karthyani Amma

== Release ==
The film was released on 29 March 1985

=== Box office ===
The film was a commercial success.

== Soundtrack ==
The music was composed by Shyam and the lyrics were written by Panthalam K. P. and Bichu Thirumala.

No.	Song	Singers	Lyrics	Length (m:ss)
1	"Akhilaandamandalam"	P. Susheela, Chorus	Panthalam K. P.	
2	"Kannaanthaliyum"	K. J. Yesudas	Bichu Thirumala	

== Awards ==
Kerala State Film Awards

- Best Actress - Seema
- Best Child Artist - Master Vimal
- Best Story - M. T. Vasudevan Nair
- Best Editor - K. Narayanan
