= Asuravithu (novel) =

Book by M. T. Vasudevan Nair

- Author: M. T. Vasudevan Nair
- Language: Malayalam
- Publisher: DC Books
- Publication date: 1962
- Publication place: India
- Media type: Paperback
- Pages: 274
- ISBN: 978-81-7130-331-1

Asuravithu (English: The Demon Seed) is a Malayalam novel written by M. T. Vasudevan Nair. Set in Kizhakkemuri, a fictional picturesque village in Kerala, the novel describes the plight of the protagonist Govindankutty, the youngest son of a proud Nair tharavadu, as he is trapped between the social scenario, social injustice and his own inner consciousness. As in many other M. T. novels, Asuravithu also has as its theme, the conflicts and problems of a Nair Family. The novel's English translation is titled The Demon Seed.

The novel was adapted into a film with the same title in 1968. The film, directed by A. Vincent and scripted by M. T. Vasudevan Nair himself, featured noted actor Prem Nazir as Govindankutty.
