= Naalukettu (novel) =

1958 novel by M.T. Vasudevan Nair

- Author: M. T. Vasudevan Nair
- Language: Malayalam
- Genre: Novel
- Publisher: Current Books, DC Books
- Publication date: 1958
- Publication place: India
- English publication date: 1975
- Media type: Print
- Pages: 204
- Awards: 1959: Kerala Sahitya Akademi Award
- ISBN: 978-81-226-0727-7

Naalukettu is a Malayalam novel written by M. T. Vasudevan Nair. Published in 1958, it was MT's first major novel. The title attributes to Nālukettu, a traditional ancestral home (Taravad) of a Nair joint family. Like many other novels written by MT, Naalukettu is also set against the backdrop of the declining traditional joint family structure of Kerala in a newly independent India.

Naalukettu remains a classic in Malayalam fiction. It contributed to the renewal of a literary tradition initiated by S. K. Pottekkatt, Thakazhi Sivasankara Pillai, and Uroob in the 1950s. It was given the Kerala Sahitya Akademi Award in 1959. It has had 66 reprints (as of 2025), was translated into 14 languages, had a record sale of half a million copies (as of 2008), and still features in the best-seller lists.

Doordarshan adapted the novel into a television film in 1995 with Malayalam actor, Krishnaprasad, as the protagonist. It won the Kerala State Television Award for the year 1996. A screenplay based on the novel was released on 8 December 2012 as part of the DC International Book Festival, Thiruvananthapuram.

== Plot ==
'The story takes place in a traditional tharavadu of Kerala's Nair community in its final gasp for life. The hero, Appunni, is a scion of a once rich and powerful family. Appunni is the son of a woman who married a man of her own choice and refused to marry the man whom her Karnavar suggested. So, she has to leave the family with her son. Appunni grows up without a father. The novel captures the traumas and psychological graph of Appunni, an introvert and angry youth, aspiring to avenge the insult meted out to him in a matrilineal family by building a new edifice on the ruins of his ancestral home.

== Reception ==
The Hindu's critic K. Kunhikrishnan comments: "Naalukettu was significant in that it fascinatingly portrayed the degeneration of the matrilineal system of joint families (tharawad), where large numbers of relatives lived together. The decline and collapse of the system resulted in nuclear families and consequential social, traditional, and economic changes. But apart from the historical angle, Naalukettu has a lasting literary value, as one of the best in Malayalam fiction."

== Translations ==
The novel has been translated into various Indian and foreign languages. The English translation is by:

- Gita Krishnankutty (2008). Naalukettu: The House Around the Courtyard. Oxford University Press.

The Arabic translation is by:

- Musthafa Wafy and Anas Wafy with the same title and published by Al-Madarek- Jeddha

The Konkani translation is by:

- Gokuldas Prabhu with the title Chavki. This translation won the Sahitya Akademi Translation Prize in 2002.
