= Murappennu =

- Directed by: A. Vincent
- Written by: M. T. Vasudevan Nair
- Based on: Snehathinte Mukhangal
- Produced by: Shobhana Parameswaran Nair
- Starring: Prem Nazir; Madhu; K. P. Ummer; P. J. Antony; Jyothi Lakshmi; Sharada; Adoor Bhasi
- Cinematography: A. Venkat
- Edited by: G. Venkitaraman
- Music by: B. A. Chidambaranath
- Production companies: Satya Studios, Madras
- Release date: 24 December 1965
- Running time: 176 minutes
- Country: India
- Language: Malayalam

Murappennu (transl. Customary Bride) is a 1965 Malayalam-language drama film directed by A. Vincent and written by M. T. Vasudevan Nair. The film stars Prem Nazir in the lead role with an ensemble supporting cast including Sharada, Madhu, Jyothilakshmi, K. P. Ummer, P. J. Antony and Adoor Bhasi playing the pivotal roles. The film revolves around a joint family and the romantic relationships between the cousins of the family. The film explores the Indian custom of marriage between cousins.

The film was produced and distributed by Shobhana Parameswaran Nair under the banner of Roopavani Films. It marked the debut of M. T. Vasudevan Nair, the noted Malayalam novelist to Malayalam cinema. The film's story is based on Snehathinte Mukhangal, a short story by Nair himself. He wrote the screenplay, at the behest of the producer. Murappennu became the first Malayalam film to be shot predominantly outdoors; Malayalam films were primarily filmed in Satya or Udaya Studios. Its soundtrack album and background score were composed by Chidambaranath, with cinematography by A. Venkat.

Murappennu was released on 24 December 1965, during the Christmas holiday period. The film was released to high expectations, the film received critical praise for Nair's script, Chidambaranath's music and the performances of Nazir, Madhu and Sharada. It was also commercially successful, with a 175-day theatrical run, becoming a silver jubilee hit. It won the Certificate of Merit for the Third Best Feature Film at the 13th National Film Awards. The film was the first part of Nair's trilogy of political melodramas – the other two being P. Bhaskaran's Iruttinte Athmavu (1967) and Vincent's Asuravithu (1968).

== Plot ==
Kunjikrishna Menon is the head of a joint family. His son Kesavankutty is in love with Kochammini, Menon's sister's daughter, while Balan, Kochammini's brother, is in love with Menon's daughter.

Balan is a responsible young man, while his younger brother. Aniyan is selfish, cold, and unfeeling, with no empathy for anyone around him. Balan, Aniyan, and Kesavan study at the same college.

Menon is a short-tempered and domineering man. He dominates his family, and they have no say in their lives. The joint family splits due to a property issue, and Madhavi Amma is forced to move from her ancestral house to another house with her son and daughter. Menon was paying for the education of his nephews. He refuses to pay for their education, and Madhavi Amma pleads with him to pay her son's fees so they can complete their education. Menon agrees to pay only one person's fees. Balan sacrifices his chance at an education for his younger brother, Aniyan.

Kochammini and Kesavankutty meet surreptitiously, which Balan doesn't like as he feels they may do something and ruin the family name. So, he reaches out to Menon to get them married. Madhavi Amma thinks both couples should get married on the same day. But Menon refuses to marry Bhagi with Balan. He decides to marry off Bhagi to the educated and well-settled Aniyan. He cleverly promises to marry Kesavankutty and Kochammini after Bhagi and Aniyan's wedding. Balan and Bhagi are shocked and dismayed, but Balan convinces Bhagi to marry Aniyan so his sister can marry Kesavankutty. But after the wedding, Menon doesn't keep his word and fixes Kesavankutty's marriage with a girl from a wealthy family. Kesavankutty has failed his exams, has no job, and depends on his father. So he has to give in to his father's plans for his wedding.

Meanwhile, Balan fixes Kochamani's wedding with Chandran. Chandran's father wants a considerable dowry. Balan reaches out to Aniyan for the dowry money, but he feigns inability to gather the funds. Angered at the situation, Bhagi walks out of her house, reaches Balan, and gives him her jewelry to pawn for money. In the meantime, a repentant Aniyan convinces Chandran to marry Kochammini. At the village, hearing the preparation of Kesavan's wedding, Balan storms into his house and convinces Kesavankutty to marry Kochammini. By the time they reach Balan's home, Kochammini has died by suicide.

== Cast ==
- Prem Nazir as Balan
- Madhu as Kesavankutty
- K. P. Ummer as Aniyan
- Sharada as Bhagirathi
- Jyothi Lakshmi as Kochammini
- P. J. Antony as Kunjikrishna Menon
- Sukumari as Mrs.Menon
- Shanta Devi as Madhavi Amma
- Kunjandi as Kuttappa Menon
- Adoor Bhasi
- Murali as Chandran
- S. P. Pillai
- Nellikode Bhaskaran as Veerankutty
- Nilambur Balan as Chathan
- Baby Vrinda as Minikkutty, Menon's grand daughter

== Soundtrack ==
The songs became popular and is regarded as one of the best works by Chidambaranath. Three of its songs, "Karayunno Puzha Chirikkunno" (by K. J. Yesudas), "Kaliyaakki Enne Kaliyaakki" (by S. Janaki) and "Kadavathu Thoniyadukkumbol" (by S. Janaki and Santha P. Nair) became evergreen hits. "Kadavathu Thoniyadukkumbol" was inspired by "Janoo Janoo Ri Kaahe Khanke Tora Kangana" (composer: S D Burman, singers: Geeta Dutt & Asha Bhonsle, film: Insan Jaag Utha (1959), which itself was based on a "chhed chhaad" style folk song. The song "Karayunno Puzha Chirikkunno" was described by The Hindu as one of the greatest melodies of all time in Malayalam cinema.

All lyrics are written by P. Bhaskaran; all music is composed by B. A. Chidambaranath.

No.	Title	Artist(s)	Length
1.	"Kadavathu Thoni"	S. Janaki, Santha P. Nair
2.	"Kalithozhimarenne Kaliyaakki"	K. J. Yesudas, S. Janaki, Choir
3.	"Kannaaram Pothi"	B. A. Chidambaranath, Latha Raju
4.	"Karayunno Puzha"	K. J. Yesudas
5.	"Onnaanaam"	Choir, Shantha P. Nair
6.	"Pulluvanpaattu"	Choir
7.	"Theyavazhi Thamburante"	B. A. Chidambaranath, P. J. Antony

== Release ==
Murappennu was released on 24 December 1965. The film was a major commercial success, with a theatrical run of over 175 days. In 2009, B. Vijayakumar of The Hindu wrote, "The film stood out for some superb acting by Prem Nazir, P. J. Antony, newcomer Jyothilakhsmi and Sharada." Further writing, "The scenes presented by Adoor Bhasi, S. P. Pillai and Kunjava provided comic relief. Other than aiming at the box office there was no justification in the inclusion of these scenes and characters in an otherwise serious film. These characters did not connect with the main storyline." He then, praised the script's use of the Valluvanadan dialect throughout the film. The film's soundtrack was also successful. On 2009, P. K. Ajithkumar wrote, "Nazir has often been dismissed, sometimes too easily, as just a star and not an actor. But even his harshest critics could not have ignored his powerful performance in Murappennu."

== Legacy ==
The Hindu described Murappennu as "a well-made film with a compelling plot" and as "one of the most significant films in the history of Malayalam cinema". This was seen as M. T. Vasudevan Nair's breakthrough in Malayalam cinema and is accepted to be one of the finest of M. T. Vasudevan Nair's works. Writing for The Hindu, B. Vijayakumar, wrote "M. T. Vasudevan Nair and A. Vincent went on to create some of the memorable films in Malayalam film history." Jaycey Foundation chairman and film producer J.J. Kuttikkattu had conducted an event to celebrate the 50th anniversary of the film.
