= Randamoozham =

1984 novel by M.T Vasudevan Nair

- Cover of 30th edition
- Author: M. T. Vasudevan Nair
- Illustrator: Namboothiri (first edition)
- Cover artist: Vinaylal (first edition)
- Language: Malayalam
- Genre: Mythology, drama
- Set in: Ancient India
- Publisher: Current Books
- Publication date: December 1984
- Publication place: India
- Media type: Print (Paperback)
- Pages: 328
- Awards: Vayalar Award; Muttathu Varkey Award
- ISBN: 81-226-0731-4

Randamoozham (transl. The second turn) is a Malayalam novel by M. T. Vasudevan Nair. It is a revisionist retelling of the Mahābhārata from the perspective of Bhīma, departing from the epic's traditional mythological framework by rejecting divine intervention in favour of a human-centred, realist portrayal of its characters and events.

First serialized in Kalakaumudi Weekly in 1984, it won the Vayalar Award for the best literary work in Malayalam in 1985. It also won the Muttathu Varkey Award in 1994.

== Plot ==
The plot begins with the incident of Mahaprasthanika Parva where the Pandavas leave for the pilgrimage to Himalayas, forsaking all worldly possessions. The story runs through the eyes of Bhima who faces seemingly severe frustrations as a young man. Always destined to be second to his weak elder brother, Yudhishthira, in seniority and younger brother, Arjuna, in fame and popularity, Bhima is not given his due as the main architect of the Pandava victory over their cousins, Kauravas, in the Kurukshetra War, despite killing all the 100 Kauravas.

The book unravels all the hardships and dilemmas encountered by Bhima which remain unnoticed. It explores the emotions of the mighty Pandava as a son, brother, husband, and father. The story brings to light his affection for his wife, Draupadi, and how unnoticed his acts of love remain. The narrative questions the mourning of Arjuna's son, Abhimanyu, when he is killed during the battle while trying to break the Chakravyuh formation, while Bhima's son, Ghatokkach, is led to his death by sacrificing his life to save Arjuna's life. Ghatokkach's sacrifice too remains unsung and everyone finds happiness in saving Arjuna. Towards the end, Bhima is shown as the only husband who stops and tries to stay with Draupadi in her last moments during their pilgrimage.

== Translations ==
The novel has been translated into multiple languages. It was translated into English as Second Turn by P. K. Ravindranath in 1997. Another English translation by Gita Krishnankutty published in 2013 is titled Bhima: Lone Warrior. The book was translated into Tamil by Kurunjivelan as Irandaam Idam with the cover illustration by Trotsky Marudu.

== Film adaptation ==
In 2011, director Hariharan announced plans to adapt Randamoozham to screen, scripted by Nair and Mohanlal cast as Bhima. In April 2017, it was announced that the project was taken up by V. A. Shrikumar Menon, again with Mohanlal in the lead, to be produced by B. R. Shetty. The film was planned as a two-part epic. However, the project was eventually shelved after Nair withdrew the script, citing dissatisfaction with the pace of progress.
