= Sreedevi Unni =

Indian Mohiniyattam dancer

- Born: 1945 (age 80–81)
- Occupations: Actor; Dancer
- Years active: 1986 – present
- Spouse: Narayanan Unni
- Children: Monisha Unni, Sajith

Sreedevi Unni is an Indian Mohiniyattam dancer and actress best known for her work in the Malayalam cinema and TV serials. She is the mother of Monisha Unni. She came into the industry after the death of her only daughter Monisha. She has acted in several Malyalam films in crucial roles. Some of them are Oru Cherupunchiri, Saphalam, Neelathamara, Nirnayakam etc.

== Dance ==
Having participated at Dasara, Hampi and Kadamba festivals, Sreedevi was bestowed with the Karnataka Kalasri Award in 2001 for enriching the repertoire of Mohiniyattam.

== Filmography ==
•All works are in Malayalam, unless otherwise stated

Year	Title	Role	Notes
2026	Naalppathukalile Pranayam: Love in Forties	Bhanumathi	
2022	Puzhu	Mohan's wife	
2021	Resonance	—N/a	Director/Producer; Short film Stream on Neestream in 2022
2020	Veeram Na Bhayam	Ammachi	Short film
2020	Antaraal	Mother	Short film
2019	Virus	Abid's mother	
2019	Kuttymama	Janaki teacher	
2019	Irupathiyonnaam Noottaandu	Thresikutty Koshy	
2018	Premanjaly	Bhagi Thampuratti	
2018	Drama	Mukundan's mother	
2018	Aami	Kochukuttiamma	
2017	Katha Katha Karanam	-	Short film
2016	Sharkkara Kondu Thulabharam	-	Short film
2016	Kochavva Paulo Ayyappa Coelho	Kochavva's mother	
2015	One Second Please	-	
2015	Nirnnayakam	Arya's grandmother	
2014	7th Day	Sr.Veronica	
2014	Cousins	Nagarajan's wife	
2014	To Noora with Love	Kunjacha	
2013	Namboothiri Yuvavu @43	Devaki Antharjanam	
2013	Sringaravelan	Kovilakam Thampuratti	
2013	Buddy	Radha Rabhia	
2013	Mumbai Police	Witness	
2013	Silence	Sangeetha's mother	
2012	Mazhavillinattam Vare		
2012	Ordinary	Iravi's mother	
2012	Diamond Necklace	Arun's mother	
2010	Katha Thudarunnu	Shanavas's mother	
2010	Elsamma Enna Aankutty	Sharadamma	
2010	Paattinte Palazhy	Shabana Beegum	
2010	Karayilekku Oru Kadal Dooram		
2010	Amma Nilavu		
2009	Neelathamara	Maluvamma	
2009	Ninagaagi Kaadiruve	Shweta's mother	
2007	Nivedyam	Mohanakrishnan's mother	
2005	Mayookham	Devayani aka Devu	
2005	Bus Conductor	Bhavani Ramaswamy	
2003	Saphalam	Lakshmikutty	
2000	Oru Cheru Punchiri	Radha	
1991	Kadavu	Amina	
1990	Veena Meettiya Vilangukal		
1990	Kuruppinte Kanakku Pustakom	House owner/Head nurse	
1987	Rithubhedam		
1986	Rajathanthram	-	
1986	Nakhakshathangal		

== TV serials ==
Year	Serial	Channel	Notes
2011-2012	Agniputhri	Asianet	
2013-2015	Sarayu	Surya TV	
2018-2019	Arundathi	Flowers TV	
2022-2023	Kaiyethum Doorath	Zee Keralam	
2023	Ninnishtam Ennishtam	Surya TV	

== TV shows ==
- Arangettam
- Charutha
- Tharapakittu
- Pularvela
- Vanitha
- Varthaprabhatham
- Comedy Stars
- Malayali Darbar
- Ammamarude Samsthana Sammelanam
- Straight Line
- Red Carpet
- Super ammayu makalum
