= Nagarame Nanni =

1967 Malayalam film by A. Vincent

- Directed by: A. Vincent
- Written by: M. T. Vasudevan Nair
- Produced by: Shobhana Parameswaran Nair
- Starring: Prem Nazir; Madhu; Usha Nandhini; K. P. Ummer; P. J. Antony; Sukumari; Adoor Bhasi
- Cinematography: A. Venkat
- Music by: K. Raghavan
- Production company: Roopavani
- Release date: 5 October 1967
- Country: India
- Language: Malayalam

Nagarame Nanni is a 1967 Malayalam language film, written by M. T. Vasudevan Nair and directed by A. Vincent. The film stars Madhu, Prem Nazir, Usha Nandhini and K. P. Ummer among others. The film tells the story of a family that migrates from a village to the city of Madras in search of a better life. The theme was about the lure of the city and how the dreams of villagers are shattered by its inexorable logic of greed. The plot is similar to the 1964 Turkish film Birds of Exile (Turkish original title: Gurbet Kuşları) by Halit Refiğ. K. Balachander's Tamil film Pattina Pravesam (1977) was based on all these three films.

Film expert B. Vijayakumar of The Hindu described Nagarame Nanni as "one of the best social movies produced in Malayalam."

== Cast ==
- Madhu as Raghavan
- Prem Nazir as Madhavankutty
- Ushanandini as Bharathi
- P. J. Antony as Anandan Pillai
- K. P. Ummer as Captain Das
- Sukumari as Mrs. Mudaliar
- Bharathi Menon as Madhavankutty's mother
- Jyothi Lakshmi as Kunhilakshmi, Madhavankutty's sister
- Adoor Bhasi
- Nilambur Balan
- Dhaamu
- Pariyanampatta Kunjunni Namboothirippad
- Nambiar
- Venu
- Kuttan Pilla
- Edasseri
- Maniyan
- Shankar Menon
- Solaman
- Prabhakaran
- Santha Devi
