= Oru Cheru Punchiri =

- Directed by: M. T. Vasudevan Nair
- Written by: Sriramana (Story); M. T. Vasudevan Nair (Screenplay)
- Produced by: Jisha John
- Starring: Oduvil Unnikrishnan; Nirmala Sreenivasan
- Cinematography: Sunny Joseph
- Edited by: Beena Paul
- Music by: Johnson
- Production company: Chithranjali Studio
- Release date: September 2000
- Running time: 89 minutes
- Country: India
- Language: Malayalam

Oru Cheru Punchiri (English: A Slender Smile) is a 2000 Indian Malayalam-language romantic drama film written and directed by M. T. Vasudevan Nair. This is his sixth film as a director. The film stars Oduvil Unnikrishnan and Nirmala Sreenivasan in the lead roles.

== Plot ==
Oru Cheru Punchiri is the story of a retired estate manager Krishna Kurup in his mid seventies and his wife Ammalukutty in her mid sixties.

The pair live in their ancestral house where Kurup does some vegetable farming. Their life, albeit simple, is fulfilling with Kurup busy with his vegetable patch while Ammalukutty prepares his favorite dishes and looks after his medical needs. They make it clear that they would never surrender to the plea of their adult children to sell the ancestral property in the village and move to the city with them as they are content with the land they own.

They have some good neighbors in Janu, her daughter Malathi and helper-boy Kannan. Krishna Kurup was instrumental in Janu getting a sweeper's job in the Urban Bank there. He also sponsors Kannan's education. Kurup helps Bhaskaran get a job in the estate he worked. He also arranges the marriage of Bhaskaran and Malathi. He also supports his granddaughter Beena who wants to marry her boyfriend from another religion.

The movie ends with Ammalukutty's decision to continue with this celebration of life even after the death of Krishna Kurup.

== Cast ==
- Oduvil Unnikrishnan as Krishna Kurup
- Nirmala Sreenivasan as Ammalukutty (Voiced by Thankamani)
- Jayakrishnan as Bhaskaran
- Lena as Beena
- Sindhu Shyam as Malathy (Voiced by Nithuna)
- P. K. Venukuttan Nair as Govindettan
- Thampi Kannanthanam as Ravi
- Roslin as Jaanu
- Sreedevi Unni as Radha
- Manka Mahesh as Subhadhra
- Aliyar as Postman Ramankutty
- Master Vignesh as Kannan
- Paul as Kesu
- Mukundan as Jayan
- Vijayan Peringode as Paulose
- Sarada as Chinnamani

== Soundtrack ==
This film has no songs.

== Filming ==
The film was shot on the banks of the Periyar River at Parappuran, Puthiyedam, Chowwara, Sreemoolanagaram, and Aluva in Kochi, India.

== Awards and recognitions ==
- Special mention at the FIPRESCI awards in 2000.
- Indian National Film Award for the Best Film on Environment Conservation/Preservation in 2001.
- The Kerala State Film Award for the best director of 2000.
- Screened at the third Mumbai International Film Festival in November 2000.
- Screened at the International Film Festival of Kerala in 2001.
- Selected for the Munich International Film Festival.
- last few scenes of the screen play of this movie has been included in the Malayalam textbook for class IX formulated by SCERT
