= Kuttyedathi =

- Directed by: P. N. Menon
- Written by: M. T. Vasudevan Nair
- Produced by: M. B. Pisharody; P. N. Menon
- Starring: Kuttyedathi Vilasini; Jayabharathi; Sathyan; S. P. Pillai
- Cinematography: Ashok Kumar
- Edited by: Ravi Kiran
- Music by: M. S. Baburaj
- Production company: Menon Productions
- Release date: 26 February 1971
- Country: India
- Language: Malayalam

Kuttyedathi (transl. Kutty, the Elder Sister) is a 1971 Malayalam language film, directed by P. N. Menon and written by M. T. Vasudevan Nair. It was widely regarded as one of the best South Indian films made in the 1970s. The film is woven around the life of a girl, who is an ugly duckling with tomboyish tendencies, and who is continuously discriminated against in favour of her prettier younger sister. The film was shot at Edappal.

== Cast ==
- Sathyan as Appunni
- S. P. Pillai as Govindan Nair
- Jayabharathi as Janu
- Jeassy
- Kuttyedathi Vilasini as Malu (Kuttiyedathi)
- Master Sathyajith as Vasu
- Kuthiravattam Pappu as Kuttishankaran
- Raman Menon
- Ammini
- Balan K. Nair
- Nilambur Balan as Karuthan
- Philomina as Narayani
- Kozhikode Shantha Devi as Meenakshi

== Soundtrack ==
The music was composed by M. S. Baburaj and the lyrics were written by Swathi Thirunal and Sreekumaran Thampi.

No.	Song	Singers	Lyrics	Length (m:ss)
1	"Alarshara Parithaapam"	Machad Vasanthi, Kalamandalam Saraswathi	Swathi Thirunal	
2	"Chithralekhe Priyamvade"	P. Leela, Machad Vasanthi	Sreekumaran Thampi	
3	"Prapancha Chethana"	S. Janaki	Sreekumaran Thampi	
