= Kaalam (novel) =

Novel by M. T. Vasudevan Nair

Kaalam is a novel by Indian author M. T. Vasudevan Nair. The book takes the reader along with protagonist Sethu Madhavan through a journey across time (Kaalam).

== Synopsis ==
The story is set during the early 1960s amidst the backdrop of land reforms and poverty in Kerala. Sethu Madhavan is a member of a family in Valluvanad. He realizes the worthlessness of achievements and understands that life persists at the mercy of time. His ambitions are brewed from the poor economic status of his family and his father's neglect of the family. He cannot afford the posh lifestyle in college hostel. He lacked nice clothes and money to meet daily expenses.

He meets three women who deeply affect him. The first is Sumitra, his cousin. This relationship is portrayed as a teenager's fancy that becomes physical. Next is Thankamani, whom he wishes to marry. His lack of a good job deters him. He gets a job as a Village Extension Officer, but loses it over problems with higher officials on petty issues. He plans to commit suicide, but changes his mind and struggles on.

He becomes a clerk at the firm of Srinivasan Muthalaly in a faraway coastal city. The job is offered to him in return for lying in favour of Srinivasan in a court and saving him from punishment. He meets Lalitha Sreenivasan, his boss's wife. She leads a monotonous existence due to her husband's neglect. Chemistry attracts Lalitha to Sethu as both painfully feel loneliness. As a trustworthy employee, Sethu takes on bigger responsibilities and makes money by cheating the firm. Sreenivasan falls to a stroke and learns of the relations between his employee and his wife. Sethu parts ways with Sreenivasan, Lalitha divorces him and the lovers begin a new life. During this period, he distances himself from his parents and other relatives. He slowly realizes that upper-class society life is not for him. After witnessing a "compromising" scene of Laitha with businessman Indrajith, he plans to visit his village. Sethu is in a state of inner conflict as he has begun realizing that his achievements are actually failures. He learns that Thankamani lives in Bombay with her kids and leads a happy family life. There he finds Sumitra in an abandoned state and confesses that he has loved her, but she declares she is happy living alone. She turns down his offer of help saying that Sethu has no compassion for anybody but himself. The novel ends as Sethu returns to the City as a man realizing the agony of loneliness.

== Recognition ==
- The author was awarded the Sahitya Academy Award for the work in 1970.

== Translations ==
The novel has been translated into English:

- Celine Matheu (=Mathew) (1979). The Legacy. Vikas Publishing House.
- Gita Krishnankutty (1998). Kaalam. Sangam.
- Gita Krishnankutty (2010). Kaalam. Orient Blackswan.
