= Kalamandalam Saraswathi =

Indian classical dancer

- Born: Saraswathi; Palakkad district, Kerala, India
- Occupations: Indian classical dancer, dance teacher
- Known for: Dance
- Spouse: M. T. Vasudevan Nair (m. 1977)
- Awards: Kerala Sangeetha Nataka Akademi Award (1983)

Kalamandalam Saraswathi is an Indian classical dancer from Kerala. She has mastered dance forms like Mohiniyattam, Bharatanatyam and Kuchupudi. Saraswathi is a recipient of the Kerala Sangeetha Nataka Akademi Award in 1983 for Bharatanatyam. She is the wife of Malayalam writer M. T. Vasudevan Nair.

== Biography ==
Saraswathi was born in Kuzhalmannam village of Palakkad district, Kerala. She joined the Kalamandalam in 1960 and studied Mohiniyattam under the tutelage of Thottassery Chinnammu Amma and Kalamandalam Sathyabhama. Saraswathi also studied various dance forms such as Kuchipudi and Bharatanadyam under Padma Subramaniam, Chitra Vishweshwar, Rajaratnampillai, Sudharani Raghupathi, Kalanidhi Ammal and Vembatti Chinnasathyam. In 1977, she married the writer M. T. Vasudevan Nair. Saraswathi has performed dances in India and abroad. For the Cultural Exchange Programme, under her leadership Mohiniyattam has been presented in the North Eastern states of India and West Bengal during 1991-92 period.

== Awards and honours ==
In 1983, Kalamandalam Saraswathy was awarded the Kerala Sangeetha Nataka Akademi Award for Bharatanatyam. She received the Rotary Award for Professional Excellence in 2000. She was one of the artists honoured by the Kalamandalam during the institution's Golden Jubilee. In 2022, Saraswathi won the Swaralaya Kalamandalam Ramankutty Nair Award for her overall contribution to classical dance forms.
