= Vilkkanundu Swapnangal =

- Pre-release poster
- Directed by: Azad
- Written by: M. T. Vasudevan Nair
- Produced by: V. B. K. Menon
- Starring: Sukumaran; Sudheer; Mammootty; Sreevidya; Bahadoor
- Cinematography: Ramachandra Babu
- Edited by: G. Venkitaraman
- Music by: M. B. Sreenivasan
- Distributed by: Dinny Films
- Release date: 16 May 1980
- Country: India
- Language: Malayalam
- Budget: ₹20 lakh (US$21,000)

Vilkkanundu Swapnangal (transl. Dreams for Sale) is a 1980 Indian Malayalam-language drama film, directed by Azad, written by M.T. Vasudevan Nair and produced by V. B. K. Menon. The film stars Sukumaran, Srividya, Sudheer, Bahadoor and Sreenivasan. The film also features Mammootty, in his first credited role.

The film explores the Middle East boom that happened in Kerala in the late seventies and early eighties, when people started to go there in search of jobs with a higher pay that would change their lives. The film explores this through Rajagopal (Sukumaran) who goes to the Middle East as an illegal immigrant to support his family.

== Plot ==
To support his family, Rajagopal goes to Dubai as an illegal immigrant. Later he meets friends who need work for their families and faces his future in Dubai.

== Cast ==
- Sukumaran... Rajagopalan Menon
- Sudheer... Gopi
- Mammootty... Madhavankutty Menon
- Bahadoor... Mammukka
- Nellikode Bhaskaran... Achuthan Nair
- Sreenivasan... Abu
- Srividya... Malathy
- Jalaja... Sridevi
- shobha... Ranjan's sister
- Premji... Sridevi's Valyammavan
- Kunjandi... Malathy's Father
- Sreelatha Namboothiri... Alice
- Khadeeja
- Santha Devi

== Production ==
Cinematographer Ramachandra Babu writes in his blog: "Since the film Devalokam stopped half way, M.T. wanted to give Muhammed Kutty one more chance in the film written by him and directed by M. Azad, Vilikkanundu Swapnangal. In a confrontation scene Muhammed Kutty proved himself as an actor with much potential against a stellar performance by Sukumaran. In the film his voice was not used but instead Sreenivasan had dubbed for him!"

== Soundtrack ==
The music was composed by M. B. Sreenivasan and the lyrics were written by Sreedharanunni.

No.	Song	Singers	Lyrics	Length (m:ss)
1	"Bhoothalam Ninte Bhadraasanam"	S. Janaki	Sreedharanunni	
2	"Chandanakkulir Veesuna"	P. Jayachandran, Chorus, C. O. Anto	Sreedharanunni	
