= Kanakambarangal =

- Directed by: N. Sankaran Nair
- Written by: Pushparajan
- Screenplay by: Pushparajan
- Produced by: A. P. Lal
- Starring: Thilakan; Murali; Babu Namboothiri; Balan K Nair
- Cinematography: Ramachandra Babu
- Edited by: G. Murali
- Music by: K. Raghavan
- Production company: Quality Movie Productions
- Distributed by: Quality Movie Productions
- Release date: 12 February 1988
- Country: India
- Language: Malayalam

Kanakambarangal is a 1988 Indian Malayalam film, directed by N. Sankaran Nair and produced by A. P. Lal. The film stars Thilakan, Murali, Babu Namboothiri and Balan K. Nair in the lead roles. The film has musical score by K. Raghavan.

== Cast ==
- Thilakan as SI Thomas George
- Murali as Ananthan Balussery
- Babu Namboothiri as Thirumeni
- Balan K. Nair
- Kunjandi as Gopalan Master
- Kuthiravattam Pappu as Nanappan
- Monisha as Sreedevi
- Vineeth as Rajan
- Santha Devi as Sreedevi's mother
- Nilambur Balan as Police Inspector

== Soundtrack ==
The music was composed by K. Raghavan and the lyrics were written by P. Bhaskaran.

No.	Song	Singers	Lyrics	Length (m:ss)
1	"Kannadachaalum"	K. S. Chithra	P. Bhaskaran	
2	"Kannadachaalum" (M)	P. Jayachandran	P. Bhaskaran	
3	"Kannadachaalum" (Pathos Bit)	K. S. Chithra	P. Bhaskaran	
4	"Thodalle"	K. S. Chithra, Unni Menon	P. Bhaskaran	
5	"Threthaayugam"	P. Jayachandran	P. Bhaskaran	
