= Thakazhi (film) =

- Directed by: M. T. Vasudevan Nair
- Screenplay by: M. T. Vasudevan Nair
- Produced by: Devasri Films; Sahitya Akademi
- Narrated by: M. T. Vasudevan Nair
- Cinematography: Thazhayan
- Edited by: S. Naveen Raj
- Music by: Raveendran
- Production company: Devasri Films
- Release date: 1998
- Running time: 57 minutes
- Country: India
- Language: Malayalam

Thakazhi is a 1998 Malayalam documentary film made by M. T. Vasudevan Nair on renowned Malayalam writer, Thakazhi Sivasankara Pillai (1912–1999). The 57-minute film was written, directed and narrated by Nair for Sahitya Akademi. The film's music was provided by Raveendran.
