= Daya (film) =

daya
- DVD Cover
- Directed by: Venu
- Written by: M. T. Vasudevan Nair
- Produced by: C. K. Gopinath
- Starring: Manju Warrier; Krishna; Nedumudi Venu
- Cinematography: Sunny Joseph
- Edited by: Beena Paul
- Music by: Songs: Vishal Bhardwaj; Background Score: Sharreth
- Release date: 1998
- Running time: 150 minutes
- Country: India
- Language: Malayalam

Daya is a 1998 Indian Malayalam-language period film written by M. T. Vasudevan Nair, directed by Venu, and starring Manju Warrier in the title role. The film is a loose adaption of the story of Zumurrud from the Middle Eastern folktales One Thousand and One Nights: though the plot is somewhat different. Vishal Bhardwaj scored the music of the film. It was the directorial debut of cinematographer Venu. He won the awards for best debut director at the National Film Awards and Kerala State Film Awards.

== Plot ==
The film is set in the Middle-East in the pre-Islam period. It is about the adventures of a lively and intelligent slave girl named Daya. Mansoor, the son of an aging and wealthy nobleman, is used to an extravagant way of life. Squandering his wealth after his father's death, he is forsaken by all his friends, except the loyal slave girl, Daya, who suggests that she be sold at the slave market for an exorbitant price. The envoys of the King interrupt the sale and take Daya to court, where she is tested for her intelligence. She clears the test and is showered with gifts. The King also allows her to live with Mansoor, but is kidnapped by Ali Shah and Rashid who has the business of selling slave women. Mansoor with the help of his new neighbor, Amina, plans to save Daya from Ali Shah's kota. But Mansoor reaches late that night and Daya mistaking someone else as Mansoor is taken away by the thief, Minnal jawan. She is forced to masquerade as a man to save herself from Minnal jawan. As a man, she travels to another kingdom where the king is searching for a loyal minister. She in the disguise of a man passes all the difficult tests, including an archery competition and a sword-fighting duel. She has an opportunity to defeat the king in a chess match, but she retracts her winning move and settles for a draw in order to not hurt the king's feelings and impresses the King. The King makes her the minister. The King's daughter gets infatuated by her thinking she is a man. She as the minister intelligently takes revenge on everyone who ill-treated her with the help of Amina. She finally meets a confessional Mansoor and decides to elope with him as the King is planning her marriage with the princess. The King finds out the truth and decides to punish Daya - a woman who dared to challenge men. The people support Daya's wisdom and request the King to forgive her as the kingdom needs Daya's wisdom as a minister. The King forgives Daya and re-appoints her as the minister. The story ends on a happy note with Daya and Mansoor getting married.

== Cast ==
- Manju Warrier as Daya / Sumuru / Sameer
- Krishna as Mansoor
- Nedumudi Venu as a King
- Smita Bansal as Princess
- K. P. A. C. Lalitha as Amina
- Captain Raju as the Sultan
- Lal as Kombanali
- E.A. Rajendran as Rasheed
- Kozhikode Narayanan Nair as Syed Anwar, Mansoor's father
- T. P. Madhavan as Hussain
- Alencier Ley Lopez ( Uncredited role )

== Awards ==
National Film Awards

- Indira Gandhi Award for Best Debut Film of a Director - Venu
- Best Costume Designer - S. B. Satheesan
- Best Choreographer - Brinda Master

Kerala State Film Awards

- Best Screenplay - M. T. Vasudevan Nair
- Best Debut Director - Venu
- Best Costume Designer - S. B. Satheesan
- Best Art Director - Sameer Chanda
- Best Editor - Beena Paul

== Soundtrack ==
The soundtrack for the film was composed by Vishal Bhardwaj. The lyrics were written by O. N. V. Kurup.Sharreth composed the original background score of the movie.

1. "Kanni Penne" - K. J. Yesudas
2. "Neeyen Kamamohini" - Hariharan
3. "Saradendu" - K. S. Chithra
4. "Sneha Lolamam" - K. S. Chithra
5. "Sneha Lolamam" - Sudeep Kumar
6. "Swargam Thedi" - Sujatha
7. "Visada Ragam" - K. J. Yesudas
8. "Vishada Ragam" - Radhika Thilak
