= Valarthumrugangal =

1981 Indian film

- Lobby card
- Directed by: Hariharan
- Written by: M. T. Vasudevan Nair
- Based on: Valarthumrugangal (1954) by M. T. Vasudevan Nair
- Produced by: K. C. Joy
- Starring: Ratheesh; Sukumaran; Madhavi; Thikkurissy Sukumaran Nair
- Cinematography: Melli Irani
- Edited by: G. Venkittaraman
- Music by: M. B. Sreenivasan
- Production company: Priyadarsini Movies
- Distributed by: Priyadarsini Movies
- Release date: 29 May 1981
- Country: India
- Language: Malayalam

Valarthumrugangal (transl. Pets) is a 1981 Indian Malayalam-language drama film directed by Hariharan and written by M. T. Vasudevan Nair based on his 1954 short story of the same name. It stars Ratheesh, Sukumaran, Madhavi and Thikkurissy Sukumaran Nair. The film has musical score by M. B. Sreenivasan. It is the only film Nair contributed to as lyricist for the songs.

== Cast ==
- Ratheesh as Chandran
- Sukumaran as Dair Devil Bhaskaran
- Madhavi as Janu
- Thikkurissy Sukumaran Nair
- V. T. Aravindakshamenon
- Vijayavani
- Balan K. Nair as Kumaran Gurukkal
- Chithra
- G. K. Pillai
- K. P. Ummer
- Nagesh
- Nanditha Bose
- Oduvil Unnikrishnan as Govindan
- P. K. Abraham
- Prathima
- Santo Krishnan

== Soundtrack ==
The music was composed by M. B. Sreenivasan and the lyrics were written by M. T. Vasudevan Nair.

No.	Song	Singers	Lyrics	Length (m:ss)
1	"Kaakkaalan Kaliyachan"	K. J. Yesudas	M. T. Vasudevan Nair	
2	"Karmathin Paathakal Veedhikal"	K. J. Yesudas, Chorus	M. T. Vasudevan Nair	
3	"Oru Murikkannaadiyilonnu Nokki"	S. Janaki	M. T. Vasudevan Nair	
4	"Shubha Raathri"	K. J. Yesudas	M. T. Vasudevan Nair	

== Awards ==
Madhavi won Kerala State Film Award for Best Supporting Actress for her role.
