= Kunjandi =

Indian Actor

- Born: Calicut, British India
- Occupation: actor
- Years active: 1962–1999

Kunjandi (1919–2002) was an Indian actor in Malayalam cinema. He has acted in more than 50 films. He handled character roles as well as supporting roles.

== Background ==
Kunjandi was born at Calicut. His first movie was Swargaraajyam in 1962. He was very active during the 1970s and 1980s. He died on 6 January 2002. He was 83. He was given the Kerala Sangeetha Nataka Academi Award in 1992. He also won the Pushpasree Trust Award in 1993 and Ramashram Award in 1999. He received the Kerala Sangeetha Nataka Akademi Award in 1977 and the Kerala Sangeetha Nataka Akademi Fellowship in 1999.

== Filmography ==
- Sidhartha (1998)
- Vismayam (1998)
- The Truth (1998)
- Asuravamsam (1997)
- Kalyaana Unnikal (1997)
- Kalyaanakkacheri (1997)
- April 19 (1996)
- Kaanchanam (1996)
- Vanarasena (1996)
- Kidilolkkidilam (1995)
- No. 1 Snehatheeram Bangalore North (1995)
- Thumboli Kadappuram (1995)
- Gamanam (1994)
- Yaadhavam (1993)
- Adhwaytham (1992)
- Aamina Tailors (1991) as Moidukka
- Kadavu (1991)
- Kadathanadan Ambadi(1990)as Kandacheri Chappan
- Brahmarakshassu (1990)
- Aye Auto (1990)
- Malootty (1990)
- Maalayogam (1990)
- Mahayanam (1989)
- Dhwani (1988)
- Vellanakalude Nadu (1988)
- Kanakambarangal (1988) at Gopalan master
- Marikkunnilla Njaan (1988)
- Oridathu (1987) asThomachan
- Vrutham (1987)
- Amrutham Gamaya (1987)
- Arappatta Kettiya Gramathil (1986)
- Malamukalile Daivam (1986)
- Doore Doore Oru Koodu Koottam (1986)
- Vartha (1986)
- Panchagni (1986)
- Atham Chithira Chothi (1986) as Panikkar
- Adiverukal (1986)
- Kayyum Thalayum Purathidaruthu (1985)
- Vellam (1985)
- Anubandham (1985)
- Sreekrishna Parunthu (1984)
- NH 47 (1984)
- Surumayitta Kannukal (1983)
- Iniyenkilum (1983) as Nanu Ashari
- Kanmanikkorumma (1982)
- Ankuram (1982)
- Ee Nadu (1982) as Beeran
- Chaappa (1982)
- Ahimsa (1981)
- Ilaneer (1981)
- Greeshmajwaala (1981) as Varkey
- Angadi (1980)
- Vilkkanundu Swapnangal (1980)
- Lava (1980) as Kumaran
- Chakara (1980) as Shankaran Master
- Anyarude Bhoomi (1979)
- Bandhanam (1978)
- Uttarayanam (1975)
- Udayam Kizhakku Thanne (1978)
- Sthanarthi Saramma (1966) as Gopi Pilla
- Murappennu (1965) as Kuttappa Menon
- Aadya Kiranangal (1964) as Paappi
- Thacholi Othenan (1964) as Kandacheri Chappan
- Ammaye Kaanaan (1963) as Kuttayi
- Swargarajyam (1962)
