= Koodalloor =

- Village
- Location in Kerala, India Koodalloor (India)
- Coordinates: 9°42′16″N 76°35′21″E
- Country: India
- State: Kerala
- District: Kottayam

Languages
  - Official: Malayalam
- Time zone: UTC+5:30 (IST)
- PIN: 686587
- Vehicle registration: KL-35, KL-67
- Nearest city: Kottayam
- Lok Sabha constituency: Kottayam
- Niyamasabha constituency: Kaduthuruthy

Koodalloor is a village in Kottayam district, Kerala, India. It is strategically located 7 Kilometres off from Ettumanoor - Pala Road (deviated at Koodalloor Kavala Jn), 2 km from Kadaplamttom 24 km from Kottayam town. It has paddy fields, natural rubber plantations and other agricultural products. Kodalloor is blessed with a popular market, St Joseph's Church, St. Joseph's LP school under Pala diocese, St. Mary's Church and St. Joseph UP School under Kottayam diocese.A Community Health Centre located near Koodalloor-Vayala road caters to the out-patient & in-patient needs of the population

This village belongs to Kaduthuruthy legislative constituency and nearby villages are Kadaplamattom, Kidangoor, Vayala, Kadapoor.
