= M. T. Vasudevan Nair =

Indian writer and director (1933–2024)

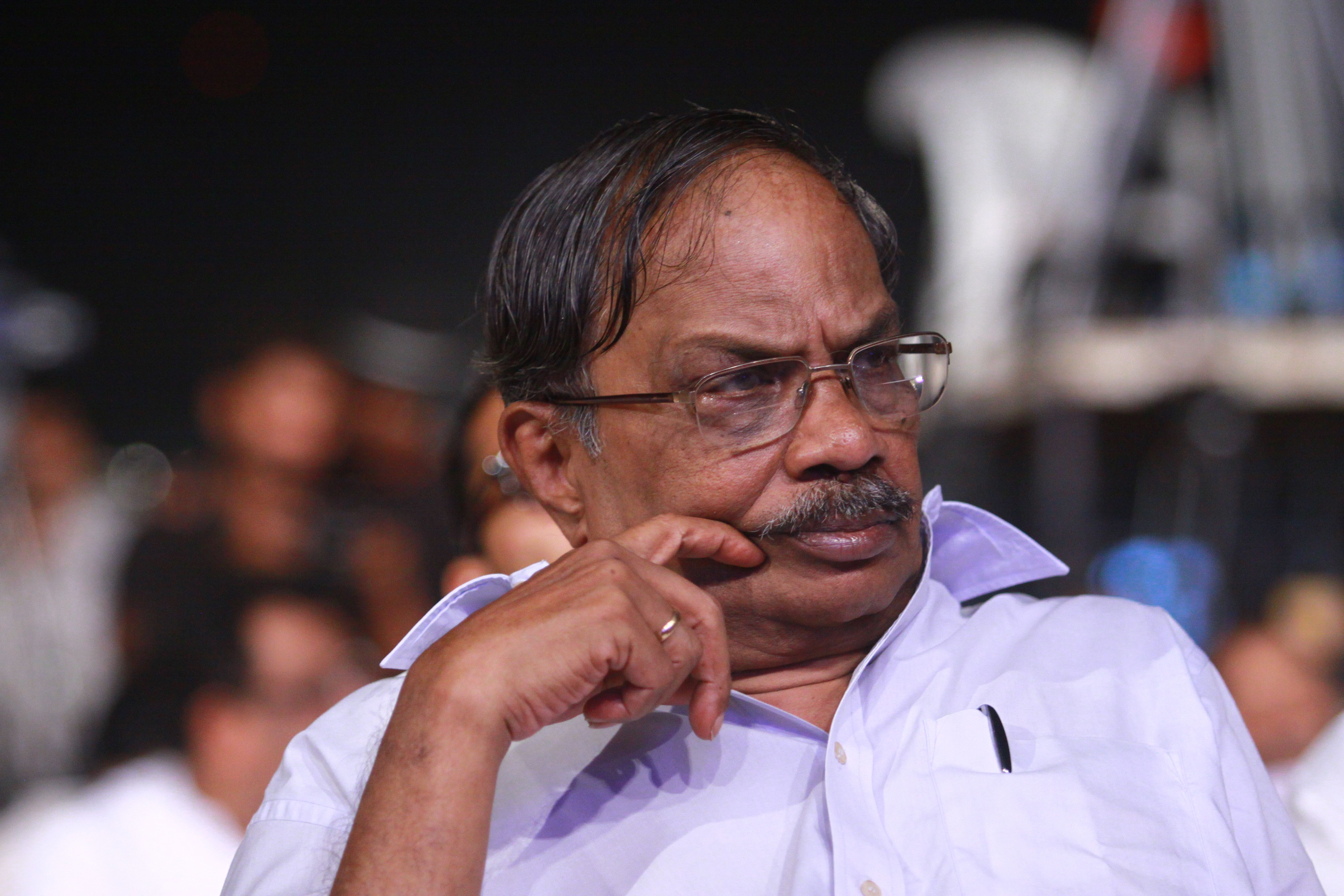
- M.T. in 2015
- Born: Madath Thekkepaattu Vasudevan Nair; 15 July 1933; Kudallur, British Malabar, Madras Presidency, India
- Died: 25 December 2024 (aged 91); Kozhikode, Kerala, India
- Education: Victoria College, Palakkad
- Occupations: Novelist, short story writer, screenplay writer, film director
- Spouses: Prameela (m. 1961; div. 1976); Kalamandalam Saraswathi (m. 1977)
- Writing career
- Language: Malayalam, English
- Genres: Novel, short story, children's literature, travelogue, essays
- Subjects: Social aspects, Oriented on the basic Kerala family and cultures
- Notable works: Naalukettu; Randamoozham; Manju; Kaalam; Asuravithu; Iruttinte Athmavu
- Notable awards: Padma Vibhushan; Padma Bhushan; Kerala Jyothi; Jnanpith; Kendra Sahitya Akademi Award; Kerala Sahitya Akademi Award

Madath Thekkepaattu Vasudevan Narayanan Nair (15 July 1933 – 25 December 2024) was an Indian author, lecturer, screenplay writer, and filmmaker. He was a prolific and versatile writer in modern Malayalam literature, and was one of the masters of post-Independence Indian literature. Randamoozham, which retells the story of the Mahabharata from the point of view of Bhimasena, is widely credited as his masterpiece.

At the age of 20, as a chemistry undergraduate, he won the prize for the best short story in Malayalam for Valarthumrigangal at World Short Story Competition jointly conducted by New York Herald Tribune, Hindustan Times, and Mathrubhumi. His first major novel, Naalukettu (The Legacy), written at the age of 23, won the Kerala Sahitya Akademi Award in 1958. His other novels include Manju (Mist), Kaalam (Time), Asuravithu (The Demon Seed), and Randamoozham (The Second Turn). The emotional experiences of his early days went into his novels, and most of his works are oriented towards the basic Malayalam family structure and culture. His three novels set in traditional tharavads in Kerala are Naalukettu, Asuravithu, and Kaalam.

Nair wrote the screenplay for 54 Malayalam films as well as directed seven films. He won the National Film Award for Best Screenplay four times, for: Oru Vadakkan Veeragatha (1989), Kadavu (1991), Sadayam (1992), and Parinayam (1994), which is the most by anyone in the screenplay category. In 1995 he was awarded the highest literary award in India, Jnanpith, for his overall contribution to Malayalam literature. In 2005, India's third-highest civilian honour, Padma Bhushan, was awarded to him. He died in Kozhikode on 25 December 2024. In 2025, he received Padma Vibhushan, India's second-highest civilian honour, posthumously.

== Early life and education ==
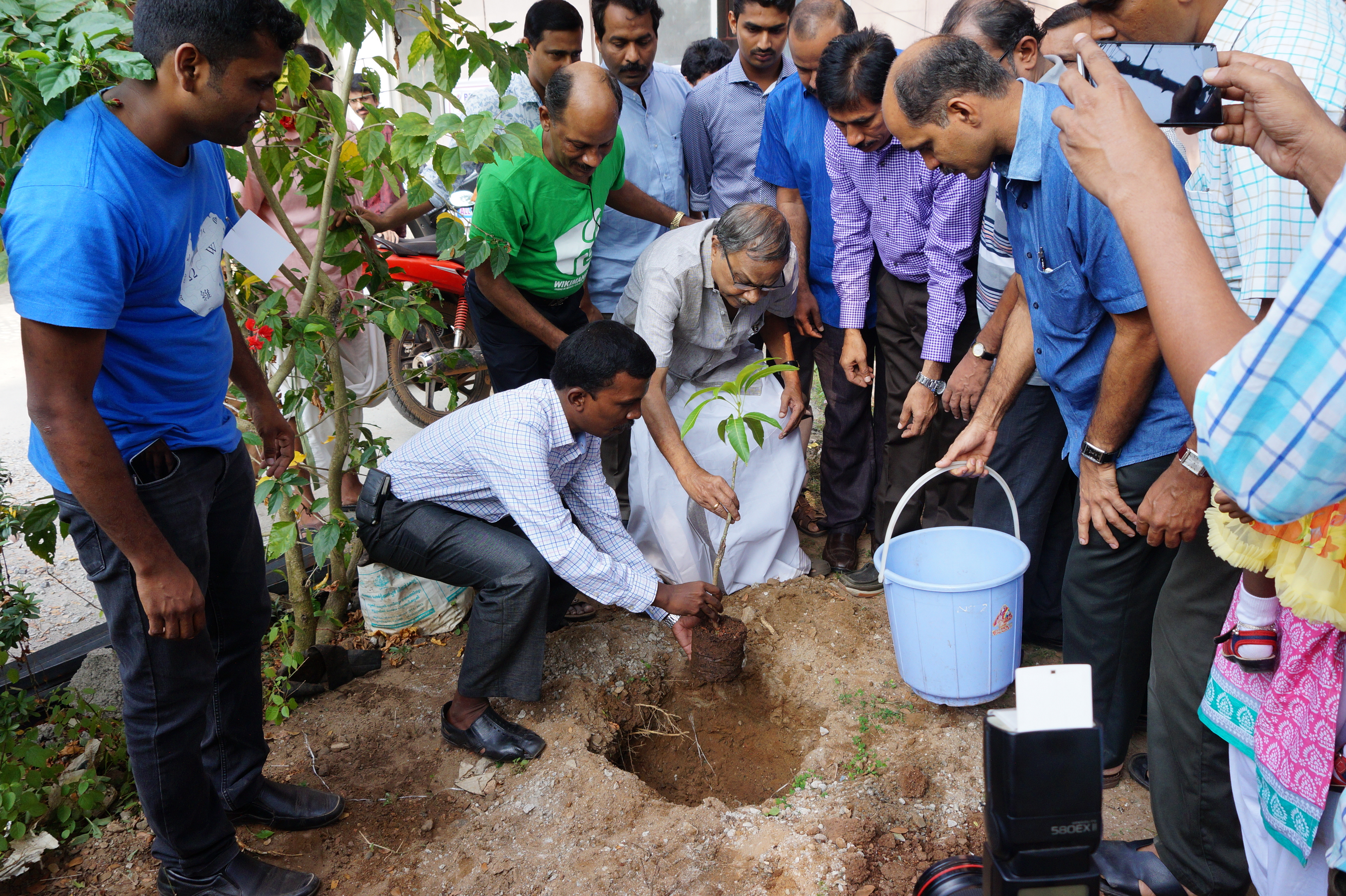
M.T. Vasudevan Nair at Malayalam Wikipedia annual meetup 2015

Madath Thekkepaattu Vasudevan Narayanan Nair was born on 15 July 1933 in the village of Kudallur, then in Ponnani Taluk (now in Pattambi Taluk, Palakkad District). His birthplace fell under Malabar District in erstwhile Madras Presidency of the British Raj. He was the youngest of four children born to T. Narayanan Nair and Ammalu Amma. His father was in Ceylon, and he spent his early days in Kudallur and in his father's house in Punnayurkulam, a village in the present-day Thrissur district. Although his family did not nurture an interest in reading, Nair started writing at an early age and had his work published in magazines.

Nair attended Malamakkavu Elementary School and then Kumaranelloor High School. He had to break education after high school, and when he joined college in 1949, he was advised to opt for the science stream as it was felt that a degree in science secured a job faster than any other degree. He obtained a degree in chemistry from Victoria College, Palakkad in 1953.

Nair taught mathematics in Pattambi Board High School and Chavakkad Board High School for over a year and worked in M.B. Tutorial College, Palakkad during 1955–56. He also worked as a gramasevakan at a block development office in Taliparamba, Kannur for a few weeks before joining Mathrubhumi Weekly as subeditor in 1957.

== Literary career ==
=== Short stories ===
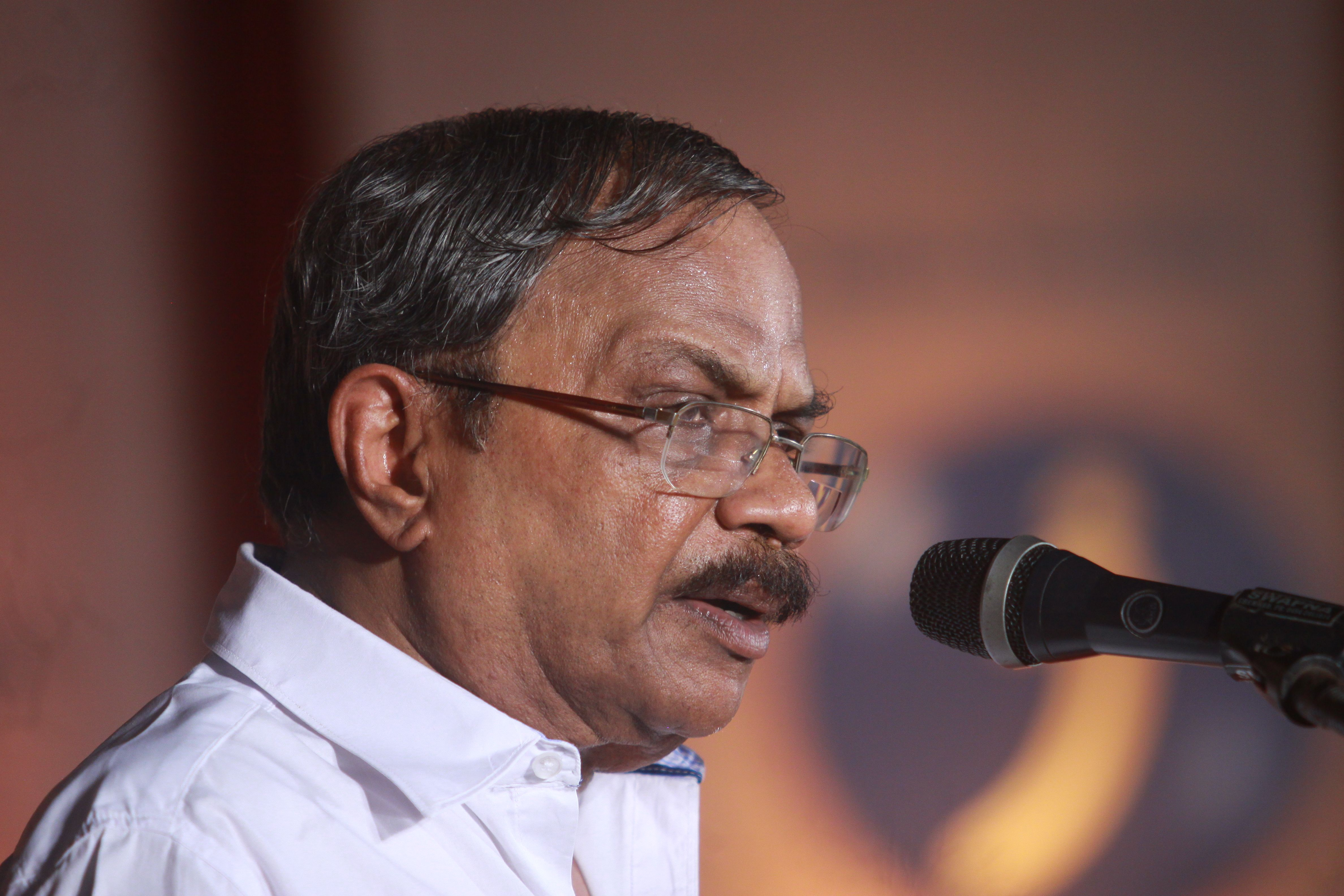
M.T. Vasudevan Nair

Nair began writing at a very young age, inspired by his elder brothers who wrote time and again in several literary journals and poet Akkitham Achuthan Namboothiri who was his senior at high school. He initially wrote poems but soon changed to prose writing. His first published work was an essay on the diamond industry of ancient India, titled "Pracheenabharathathile Vaira Vyavasayam", which appeared in Keralakshemam, a biweekly published by C. G. Nair from Guruvayoor. His first story "Vishuvaghosham" was published in Madras-based Chitrakeralam magazine in 1948. The story explores the feelings of a boy too poor to have firecrackers of his own, as he stands listening to the sounds of crackers coming from the houses of the rich celebrating the new year festival of Vishu: an overwhelming sense of loss, the painful realisation that this is the way things are and the way they're likely to stay. His first book, Raktham Puranda Manaltharikal was published in 1952.

Nair's first literary prize came to him while he was a student at Victoria College, Palakkad – his short story "Valarthumrigangal" (Pet Animals) won first prize in the World Short Story Competition conducted by The New York Herald Tribune, Hindustan Times, and Mathrubhumi in 1954. It was a short story delineating the pathetic plight of circus artistes. The numerous stories that followed dealt with themes culled from widely different milieus and contexts but were uniformly successful and popular.

The noted collections of his stories are Iruttinte Athmavu, Olavum Theeravum, Bandhanam, Varikkuzhi, Dare-e-Salam, Swargam Thurakkunna Samayam, Vaanaprastham and Sherlock. "Iruttinte Athmavu" ("Soul of Darkness"), one of the most celebrated among his short stories, is the heart wrenching story of a 21-year-old man, regarded as a lunatic by everyone and treated abominably. The story reveals the insanity behind the civilised and supposedly sane world. The story "Sherlock" moves between the rural milieu familiar to Nair's readers and the sophisticated world of Indian immigrants in the US, highlighting the contrast between them with subtle irony. Nair wrote passionately of the cruelty hidden at the heart of a seemingly idyllic rural life ("Kurukkante Kalyanam" or "The Jackal's Wedding" and "Shilalikhithangal" or "Stone Inscriptions") and of the privations endured by those dependent on the agricultural cycle ("Karkitakom" and "Pallivalum Kalchilambum" or "Sacred Sword and Anklets"). In the story "Vanaprastham", he studies the delicately balanced relationship between a teacher and a student that has miraculously survived the years.

Nair was of the opinion that short story is a genre in which a writer can achieve near perfection. He, along with T. Padmanabhan, served as bridges between the early modern short story writers in Malayalam, of the so-called renaissance, and the new short story of the late fifties and sixties.

=== Naalukettu and Asuravithu ===
Nair's debut novel Pathiravum Pakalvelichavum (Midnight and Daylight) was serialised in Mathrubhumi Weekly in 1957. His first major work Naalukettu (The Legacy; 1958) is a veritable depiction of the situation which prevailed in a typical joint family when its fortunes is on a steady decline. The title attributes to Nālukettu, a traditional ancestral home (Taravad) of a Nair joint family. The novel remains a classic in Malayalam fiction. It contributed to the renewal of a literary tradition initiated by S. K. Pottekkatt, Thakazhi Sivasankara Pillai, Vaikkom Muhammad Basheer and Uroob in the 1950s. It was given the Kerala Sahitya Akademi Award in 1959. It has had 23 reprints and was translated into 14 languages and had a record sale of a half a million copies (as of 2008) and still features in the best-seller lists. Nair himself adapted the novel into a television film for Doordarshan in 1995. It won the Kerala State Television Award for the year 1996.

Asuravithu (The Demon Seed; 1972) which is set in a fictional Valluvanadan village named Kizhakkemuri can be considered almost as a sequel to Naalukettu. It has the same geophysical and socio-cultural setting. The novel describes the plight of the protagonist Govindankutty, the youngest son of a proud Nair tharavadu, as he is trapped between the social scenario, social injustice and his own inner consciousness. In Asuravithu there are clear indications of the damaging impact of an alien culture in the pollution of the indigenous culture and the disintegration of the family and the community. These two early novels—Naalukettu and Asuravithu—depict a phase in which the economic and cultural scenario of Kerala manifested symptoms which were to develop into dangerous ecocidal tendencies at a later stage.

=== Manju and Kaalam ===
His later novels, such as Manju (Mist; 1964) and Kaalam (Time; 1969), are characterised by profuse lyricism which cannot be found in Naalukettu or Asuravithu. The eco-feminist theme of patriarchal domination and exploitation gained more prominence in Manju, Nair's only novel with a female protagonist (Vimala). Set in the splendid landscape of Nainital, it stands apart as set in a milieu different from the usual one, the Valluvanadan village. The plot of the novel is allegedly similar to a Hindi story Parinde (Birds, 1956), by Nirmal Verma. However, both Nair and Verma had rejected these claims.

In the novel Kaalam, Nair returned to his favourite milieu, the dilapidated joint-family Nair tarwad set against the wider backdrop of the Valluvanadan village in the backdrop of the crumbling matrilineal order of Kerala in a newly independent India. Sethu, the protagonist, is toppled over by the eddies of social, cultural and economic transformation. Kaalam, though not strictly autobiographical, has a strong autobiographical element in it. Manju had a film adaptation in 1983, written and directed by Nair himself. The novel also had a Hindi-language film adaptation titled Sharad Sandhya.

=== Randamoozham ===
Randamoozham (The Second Turn; 1984), retells the story of the Mahabharatha from the point of view of Bhimasena, supposed to be the son of Vayu; this is demystified or demythified in the novel. In this novel, Bhima gains, through the author's ironic undertones, a new psychological depth. "I have not changed the framework of the story by the first Vyasa, Krishna-Dwaipayana. I have read between his lines and expanded on his pregnant silences," says the author.

=== Varanasi ===
Nair's novel Varanasi (2002) is based around a journey to Varanasi, a pilgrim centre in North India. With no intricate plot, the novel is an experiment. It was well received in the literary circles but received criticism from critic and painter M. V. Devan.

=== Other works ===
Nair wrote the novel Arabi Ponnu (The Gold of Arabia) along with N. P. Mohammed. Nair and Mohamed stayed in a rented house in Karuvarakkundu village, Malappuram for a period of two weeks to complete this work.

Nair authored two books on the craft of writing—Kaathikante Panippura and Kaathikante Kala—and his anecdotal columns articles on various topics and speeches on different occasions have been compiled under the titles Kilivaathililude, Kannanthalippookkalude Kaalam, Vakkukalude Vismayam and Eekakikalude Sabdam. Manushyar Nizhalukal and Aalkkoottathil Thaniye are his travelogues.

== Other activities ==
Nair occupied many important positions in various literary bodies, including the presidency of Kerala Sahitya Akademi and the chairmanship of Tunchan Memorial Trust.

Nair joined the Mathrubhumi Group of Publications in 1956. He served as editor of periodicals and chief editor of Mathrubhumi Illustrated Weekly.

He espoused and promoted secularism through his literature, cinema, and public life. Nair created secular intellectual movement in Kerala in the 1990s for peace with many intellectuals.

== Film career ==
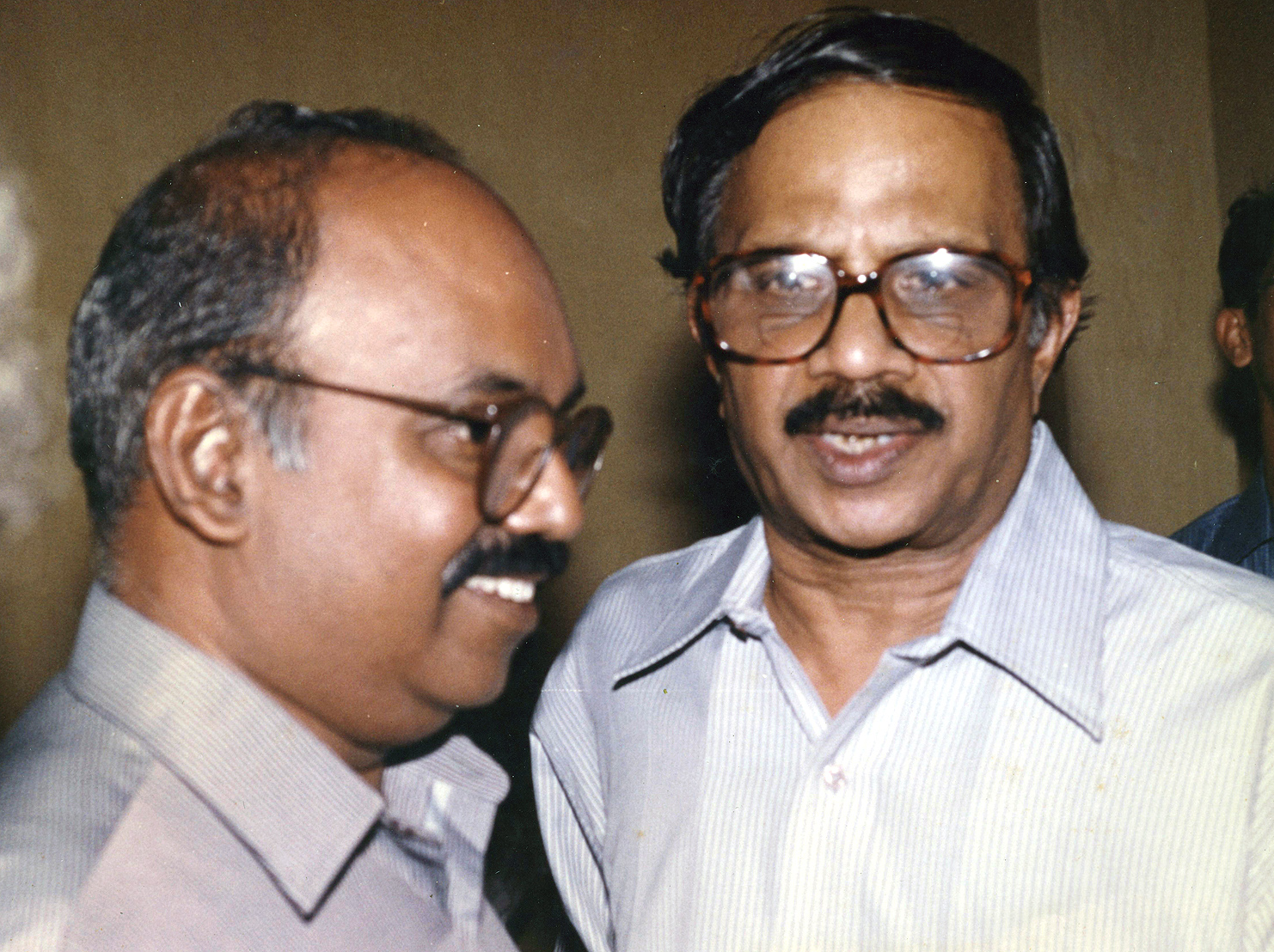
Nair along with Ramachandra Babu, who served as cinematographer in many of his films.

Nair is one of the most distinguished and well accepted script writers and directors in Malayalam cinema. He has directed seven films and written the screenplay for around 54 films. He won the National Film Award for Best Screenplay four times for: Oru Vadakkan Veeragatha (1989), Kadavu (1991), Sadayam (1992), and Parinayam (1994), which is the most by anyone in the screenplay category.

Nair wrote his first screenplay in 1965 for Murappennu, at the behest of producer Shobhana Parameswaran Nair. The film was an adaptation of his story "Snehathinte Mukhangal". The Hindu described it as "a well-made film with a compelling plot" and as "one of the most significant films in the history of Malayalam cinema".

Nair was the first and foremost script writer in Malayalam who wrote screenplays after having learnt cinema as a distinctive visual art which has its own language, grammar and structure. It was only after he began writing screenplays the Malayali viewers began to consider film script as a distinctive genre which has its own genuine features. Also, it was M.T who elevated this medium of writing as a literary form.

Nair's screenplays have won social attention for the portrayal of the social and cultural crisis in the contemporary life of Kerala. The disintegration of human values and relationship which creates identity crisis, sense of loss, dehumanisation, alienation from one's own surroundings, etc. have been presented in its depth by Nair more than any other writers. The best examples are Kanyakumari, Varikkuzhi, Vilkkanundu Swapnangal, Sadayam, Asuravithu, Edavazhiyile Poocha Mindappoocha, Akshrangal, Aalkkoottathil Thaniye, Aaroodam etc. A salient aspect of Nair's screenplays is the effective presentation of the ecological or geographical factors and elements making use of the visual possibilities of their portrayal. Another unique feature is the language employed in them. Some of his screenplays are known for giving new interpretations to historical characters and historical stories. For instance, he gives the legends woven around the popular story of Perumthachan a new interpretation in his screenplay, based on his own assessment of Perumthachan's character. According to the folklore Vadakkanpattu (Northern Ballads), Chandu is said to have betrayed his cousin because he was jealous of Aaromal's popularity and abilities. But Nair's Oru Vadakkan Veeragatha, set in 16th-century Kerala, presents an alternative version of the same legend, as it presents the incident from Chandu's perspective, suggesting that grave injustice has been done to Chandu by wrongly accusing him of replacing the rivets.

In 1973, Nair made his directorial debut with Nirmalyam which won the National Film Award for Best Feature Film. The film is about a village oracle whose services are no longer needed by the community and whose family begins to fall apart. Nair scripted and directed many more films including the award-winning Bandhanam, Kadavu and Oru Cheru Punchiri. Kadavu won awards at the Singapore International Film Festival and Tokyo International Film Festival. His cinema work also includes three documentaries and one TV series. He has written songs for the 1981 film Valarthumrugangal which were set to tune by M. B. Sreenivasan.

Nair was the chairman of Indian Panorama of the 46th National Film Awards (1998). He has also been a member of Film Finance Corporation, National Film Development Corporation and Film Censoring Committee. He has also served as a faculty in the Film and Television Institute, Pune.

== Literary style and themes ==
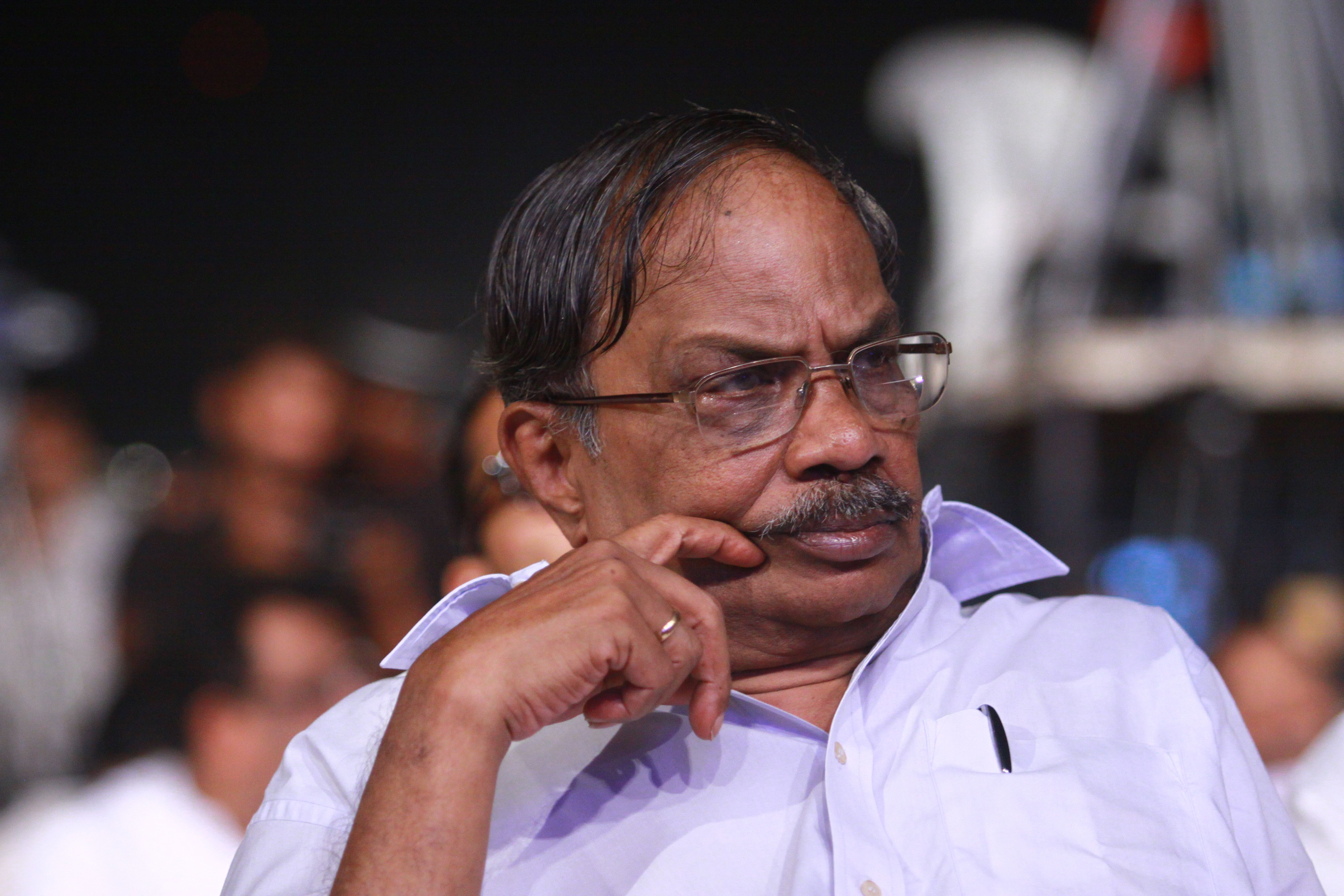
M.T. Vasudevan Nair

Nair was born and brought up in a sylvan village on the banks of Nila. The writer has so often acknowledged his indebtedness to the ethos of his village and to Nila which has ever been the mainspring of his creative inspiration. Nila occurs and re-occurs in Nair's fiction, as a presence and as a symbol, endorsing this view. The staple locale of his fiction is the Valluvanadan village. The landscape and ethos of the Valluvanad region and the transformations undergone by them in the course of the century, involving relics of the tarawad and the communal tensions provide a challenging theme for the highly evocative style of Vasudevan Nair's narrative art. The temporal milieu of Nair's fiction stretches over the second half of the twentieth century, a period of tremendous social, cultural and economic changes.

It was in the sixties that Nair rose to prominence as a writer. The phase of social realism had come to an end. In his opinion, class-war the ideal which had inspired the writers belonging to the preceding generation had almost lost its relevance by the time he entered the literary career. The prominent Malayalam writers of the pre-independence phase—Thakazhi, Vallathol and Kesavadev—were all stimulated by the progressive leftist ideals. They focussed their attention on social conflict as the theme for their writings—Conflict between capital and labour, between the landlord and the tenant, between the oppressor and the oppressed. Nair felt that this theme of conflict was an outdated phenomenon in the context of present Kerala. The protagonists of Nair are men out of society and at war with themselves, a sharp contrast to the heroes of Kesavadev or Thakazhi who fight a losing war against the hostile forces in the society. Nair, in spite of his broad and deep sympathy for the marginalised, doesn't identify himself with any particular political ideology or movement.

== Personal life and death ==
Nair married twice. He first married writer and translator Prameela in 1961. They separated after 15 years of marriage. He had a daughter from this marriage, Sithara, who works as a business executive in the United States.

Aswathy V Nair

In 1977 he married dance artist Kalamandalam Saraswathi, with whom he had a daughter, dancer Aswathy Nair.

Nair resided in Sithara, Kottaram Road, Kozhikode, named after his eldest daughter.

He died on 25 December 2024, at the age of 91. He had been admitted to Baby Memorial Hospital in Kozhikode on 15 December due to breathing difficulties. Despite medical intervention, his condition worsened, and he suffered a cardiac arrest, leading to his death.

== Recognition, awards, and honours ==
Nair is regarded as one of the masters of post-Independence Indian literature.

He was bestowed with honorary D.Litt. degree by the Calicut University and Mahatma Gandhi University.

As of 2016 the Library of Congress in Washington, D.C., United States, had a collection of 62 books authored by Nair (including some English translations) or about him.

=== Honours ===
- 1996: Honorary doctorate (D.Litt.) from University of Calicut
- 1996: Honorary doctorate from Mahatma Gandhi University
- 2005: Padma Bhushan, India's third highest civilian award
- 2008: Honorary doctorate from Netaji Subhas Open University
- 2022: Kerala Awards, instituted by the Government of Kerala
- 2025: Padma Vibhushan (posthumously), India's second-highest civilian award

=== Literary awards ===
- 1958: Kerala Sahitya Akademi Award for Novel – Naalukettu
- 1970: Kendra Sahitya Academy Award – Kaalam
- 1982: Kerala Sahitya Akademi Award for Drama – Gopura Nadayil
- 1985: Vayalar Award for Randamoozham
- 1986: Kerala Sahitya Akademi Award for Story – Swargam Thurakkunna Samayam
- 1993: Odakkuzhal Award – Vanaprastham
- 1994: Muttathu Varkey Award
- 1995: Jnanpith Award for his contributions to Malayalam literature
- 1998: Padmarajan Award – Kaazhcha
- 2001: Bahrain Keraleeya Samajam Sahithya Award
- 2003: Lalithambika Antharjanam Smaraka Sahitya Award
- 2005: Kerala Sahitya Akademi Fellowship
- 2005: Vallathol Award
- 2005: Mathrubhumi Literary Award
- 2011: Ezhuthachan Award
- 2011: T. K. Puraskaram
- 2011: Suvarnamudra Award
- 2011: Mayilpeeli Award
- 2013: Sahitya Akademi Fellowship
- 2013: Sree Chithira Thirunal Award
- 2013: K. P. S. Menon Award
- 2014: Nalappadan Award 2014 for his Holistic Contributions to Malayalam Literature (Nalappadan Memorial Cultural Society-NMCS)
- 2014: Suvarnamudra Award by Guruvayur Naadha Brahmolsavam
- 2014: A. R. Raja Raja Varma Award
- 2014: Kakkanadan Award
- 2014: Balamani Amma Award
- 2014: Tata-Landmark Literature Live! Lifetime Achievement Award
- 2015: O.M.C. Narayanan Namboodiripad Memorial Devi Prasadam Trust's Award for Literature
- 2015: Thakazhi Award
- 2016: Deshabhimani Award
- 2018: O. N. V. Literary Award
- 2024: Amar Ujala Aakashdeep Award

=== Film awards ===
==== National Film Awards ====
Nair won the following National Film Awards:

- 1973: Best Film – Nirmalyam
- 1989: Best Screenplay – Oru Vadakkan Veeragatha
- 1991: Best Screenplay – Kadavu
- 1991: Best Feature Film in Malayalam – Kadavu
- 1992: Best Screenplay – Sadayam
- 1994: Best Screenplay – Parinayam
- 2000: Best Film on Environment Conservation/Preservation – Oru Cheru Punchiri

==== Kerala State Film Awards ====
He won the following Kerala State Film Awards:

- 1970: Best Screenplay – Olavum Theeravum
- 1973: Best Film – Nirmalayam
- 1973: Best Director – Nirmalayam
- 1973: Best Screenplay – Nirmalayam
- 1978: Best Film – Bandhanam
- 1980: Best Story – Oppol
- 1981: Best Screenplay – Thrishna, Valarthu Mrigangal
- 1983: Best Story – Aaroodam
- 1985: Best Story – Anubandham
- 1986: Best Screenplay – Panchagni, Nakhakshathangal
- 1987: Best Screenplay – Amrutham Gamaya
- 1989: Best Screenplay – Oru Vadakkan Veeragadha
- 1990: Best Screenplay – Perumthachan
- 1991: Best Film – Kadavu
- 1991: Best Director – Kadavu
- 1991: Best Screenplay – Kadavu
- 1994: Best Story – Sukrutham
- 1994: Best Screenplay – Parinayam
- 1998: Best Screenplay – Daya
- 2000: Best Director – Oru Cheru Punchiri
- 2009: Best Screenplay – Pazhassi Raja

==== Kerala Film Critics Association Awards ====
He also won Kerala Film Critics Association Awards:

- 1978: Best Screenplay – Bandhanam
- 1980: Best Screenplay – Vilkkanundu Swapnangal
- 1981: Best Story – Valarthumrugangal
- 1982: Best Story – Vaarikuzhi
- 1984: Best Screenplay – Aalkkoottathil Thaniye
- 1985: Best Screenplay – Anubandham
- 1985: Best Story – Anubandham
- 1994: Best Screenplay – Sukrutham
- 1997: Best Screenplay – Ennu Swantham Janakikutty

==== Other film awards ====
Other film awards won by Nair include:

- 1991: Filmfare Special Award – South
- 1992: Singapore International Film Festival – Special Jury Award – Kadavu
- 1992: Tokyo International Film Festival – Asia Future Prize – Kadavu
- 1996: Kerala State Television Award – Naalukettu
- 2003: Asianet Film Awards – Lifetime Achievement Award
- 2016: Asianet Film Awards – Lifetime Achievement Award
- 2013: J. C. Daniel Award by the Government of Kerala

== Bibliography ==
=== Novels ===
- Naalukettu (The Legacy). Thrissur: Current. 1958. ISBN 978-81-226-0727-7.
- Pathiravum Pakalvelichavum (Midnight and Daylight) (in Malayalam). Thrissur. ISBN 9788126409792.
- M. T. Vasudevan Nair; N. P. Mohammed (1960). Arabi Ponnu (The Gold of Arabia). Thrissur: Current. ISBN 978-81-713-0516-2.
- Asuravithu (The Demon Seed). Thrissur: Current. 1962. ISBN 978-81-7130-331-1.
- Manju (Mist). Thrissur: Current. 1964.
- Kaalam (Time). Thrissur: Current. 1969.
- Vilapayathra. Kottayam: SPCS. 1978. ISBN 978-8122611366.
- Randamoozham (The Second Turn). Kottayam: SPCS. 1984. ISBN 81-226-0731-4.
- Varanasi. Thrissur: Current. 2002. ISBN 978-8122613674.

=== Short story collections ===
- Raktham Puranda Mantharikal (Blood-soaked Sand). Palghat: Kalaradhaka Sangham. 1952. ISBN 978-8122610550. (Collection of 5 stories)
- Veyilum Nilavum (Sunlight and Moonlight). Madras: Janatha Printing & Publishing House. 1954.
- Vedanayude Pookkal (Flowers of Sorrow). Palghat: Samadarsi. 1955.
- Ninte Ormakku (For Your Memories). Thrissur: Current. 1956. ISBN 978-8126422180. (Collection of 6 stories)
- Olavum Theeravum (Ripple and Shore). Trivandrum: Janatha. 1957. ISBN 978-8122612028. (Collection of 6 stories)
- Iruttinte Athmavu (The Soul of the Darkness). Thrissur: Current. 1957. ISBN 9788122608540.
- Kuttyedathy. Thrissur: Current. 1959. ISBN 978-8122612837. (Collection of 5 stories)
- Nashtappetta Dinangal (Lost Days). Thrissur: Current. 1960. (Collection of 5 stories)
- Bandhanam (The Binding). Thrissur: Current. 1963. ISBN 978-8130016238. (Collection of 5 stories)
- Kaliveedu (Playhouse). Calicut: Poorna. 1966. ASIN B096RQDM12. (Collection of 5 stories)
- Pathanam (The Fall). Thrissur: Current. 1966. ISBN 978-8122611823. (Collection of 4 stories)
- Varikkuzhi (The Trap). Thrissur: Current. 1967. (Collection of 5 stories)
- M.T.yude Thiranjedutha Kathakal. Thrissur: Current. 1968. ISBN 978-8122609219. (Collection of 34 stories)
- Dar-S-Salam. Thrissur: Current. 1970. ISBN 9788124000601. (Collection of 5 stories)
- Ajnjathante Uyaratha Smarakam. Thrissur: Current. 1973. ISBN 9788122609219. (Collection of four stories)
- Abhayam Thedi Veendum. Kottayam: SPCS. 1978. (Collection of 3 stories)
- Swargam Thurakkunna Samayam (When the Heaven's Gates Open). Calicut: Poorna. 1980. ISBN 978-8122612868.
- Vanaprastham (Into the Forest). Thrissur: Current. 1992. ISBN 9788122606300. (Collection of 4 stories)
- Sherlek. Thrissur: Current. 1998. ISBN 978-8122612844. (Collection of 4 stories)

=== Children's literature ===
- Manikyakallu. Thrissur: Current. 1957. ISBN 978-8171301782.
- Daya Enna Penkutty. Calicut: Malayalam. 1987. ISBN 978-8126421367. With illustrations by N. P. Hafiz Mohamad
- Thanthrakkari. Calicut: Guru. 1993. ISBN 978-8171309016. With illustrations by Madanan

=== Essays ===
- Kilivaathililude. Thrissur: August Books. 1992. ISBN 9788126463718. (Collection of essays)
- Ekakikalude Sabdam. Kottayam: DC Books. 1994. ISBN 8171303838. (Collection of essays and an interview with Toni Morrison)
- Ramaneeyam Oru Kaalam. Calicut: Olive. 1998. ISBN 978-8187480402. (Collection of 34 essays in five parts)

=== Memoirs ===
- Kannanthalippookkalude Kaalam. Thrissur: Current. 2003. ISBN 978-8122613322. (Collection of 27 essays)
- Snehadarangalode. Calicut: Haritham. 2003. ISBN 978-8122609073. (Collection of memoirs about 19 persons and the screenplay for the documentary Thakazhi)
- Ammaykku. Thrissur: Current. 2005. ISBN 978-8122613537.
- Chithratheruvukal. Calicut: Olive. 2010. ISBN 978-8122611380.

=== Plays ===
- Gopuranadayil. Calicut: Poorna. 1980. ISBN 978-9383155347.

=== Speeches ===
- M. N. Karassery, ed. (1999). Vakkukalude Vismayam. Calicut: Pappiyon. (Collection of 32 speeches)
- Jalakangalum Kavadangalum. Kannur: Kairali Books. 2011. ISBN 978-9381649732. (Collection of speeches)

=== Studies ===
- Kaathikante Panippura. Thrissur: Current. 1963. ASIN B01N8VHN4I.
- Hemingway: Oru Mukhavura. Thrissur: Current. 1964. ISBN 9789386429896.
- Kaathikante Kala. Kottayam: DC Books. 1984. ISBN 978-8122609226. (Collection of 7 essays)

=== Translations ===
- M. T. Vasudevan Nair; N. P. Mohammed (2001). Lokakatha. Calicut: Pappiyon. ISBN 978-8187474807. (New edition of Jeevithathinte Granthathil Ezhuthiyath. Also includes conversations between N. P. Mohammed and M. T. Vasudevan Nair)

=== Travelogues ===
- Manushyar Nizhalukal. Thrissur: Mangalodayam. 1963. (Travelogue about the journeys through Eastern Europe)
- Aalkkoottathil Thaniye. Thrissur: Current. 1972. ISBN 978-8126477081.
- Vankadalile Thuzhavallakkar. Kottayam: SPCS. 1998. ISBN 978-8182645332. (Travelogue about the journeys through China)

=== Screenplays ===
Most of Nair's screenplays are published as books. Some of the published works include:

- Ente Priyapetta Thirakathakal. Kottayam: Current. 1983. (Screenplays for the films Oppol, Vaarikuzhi, Aaroodam, Neelathamara and Idavazhiyile Poocha Minda Poocha)
- Oru Vadakkan Veeragatha. Calicut: Mulberry. 1989.
- Vaisali. Calicut: Malayalam. 1989.
- Perumthachan. Thrissur: Pusthaka. 1992.
- Panchagni. Thrissur: Current. 1992.
- Aalkkoottathil Thaniye. Calicut: Aksharam. 1993.
- Nakhakshathangal. Thrissur: Current. 1994.
- Sukrutham. Calicut: Lipi. 1996.
- Ennu Swantham Janakikutty. Cochin: Kavya. 1998.
- Adiyozhukkukal. Kottayam: SPCS. 1999.
- Nirmalyam. Thrissur: Current. 1999.
- Olavum Theeravum. Thrissur: Current. 1999.
- Daya. Calicut: Olive. 2000.
- Oru Cheru Punchiri. Kottayam: DC Books. 2001.
- Naalu Thirakathakal. Pala: Sahridaya. (Screenplays for the films Kadavu, Sadayam and Parinayam)

== Filmography ==
Year	Film	Direction	Notes
2024	Manorathangal		Anthology series based on his 9 short stories
2013	Kadhaveedu		Portmanteau film based on four stories written by himself, Vaikkom Muhammad Basheer and Madhavikutty
2013	Ezhamathe Varavu		Adaptation/Remake of his earlier unreleased film Evideyo Oru Shathru
2009	Kerala Varma Pazhassi Raja		
2009	Neelathamara (Blue Lotus)		Remake of the 1979 film of the same name with revised screenplay
2001	Theerthadanam (Pilgrimage)		Based on the story "Vanaprastham"
2000	Oru Cheru Punchiri (A Slender Smile)	Yes	Based on the story "Mithunam" by Telugu writer Sriramana
1998	Daya (Compassion)		Based on a story from One Thousand and One Nights
1998	Ennu Swantham Janakikutty		Based on the story "Cheriya Cheriya Bhookampangal"
1998	Thakazhi	Yes	Documentary on renowned Malayalam writer Thakazhi Sivasankara Pillai
1995	Naalukettu		Tele-Serial based on the novel of the same name
1994	Sukrutham		
1994	Parinayam (Wedding)		
1992	Sadayam (With Compassion)		
1991	Kadavu ( The Ferry)	Yes	Based on the story "Kadathuthoni" by S. K. Pottekkatt
1991	Venal Kinavukal (Summer Dreams)		
1990	Midhya		
1990	Perumthachan		
1990	Thazhvaram (The Valley)		
1989	Utharam (Answer)		Based on the story "No Motive" by Daphne du Maurier
1989	Oru Vadakkan Veeragatha (A Northern Story of Valor)		
1988	Aranyakam		
1988	Vaishali		
1988	Athirthikal		Based on Nair's short story Dar-Es-Salaam
1987	Amrutham Gamaya		
1986	Kochu Themmadi (The Little Rascal)		
1986	Abhayam Thedi (In Search of a Shelter)		
1986	Rithubhedam		
1986	Nakhakshathangal		
1986	Panchagni (Five Fires)		
1985	Rangam		
1985	Idanilangal		
1985	Anubandham		
1984	Aalkkoottathil Thaniye (Alone in a Crowd)		
1984	Adiyozhukkukal		
1984	Aksharangal (Alphabets)		
1984	Uyarangalil (At the Top)		
1984	Vellam (Water)		
1983	Aaroodam		
1983	Manju (Mist)	Yes	Based on the novel of the same name
1982	Varikuzhi (The Trap)	Yes	Based on the story of the same name
1981	Trishna (Thirst)		
1981	Valarthu Mrugangal		
1980	Vilkkanundu Swapnangal		
1980	Oppol (The Elder Sister)		
1979	Edavazhiyile Poocha Minda Poocha		
1979	Neelathamara (Blue Lotus)		
1978	Bandhanam (Bond)	Yes	Based on the story of the same name
1978	Ekakini		Based on the story "Karutha Chandran"; Screenplay by P. Raman Nair
1977	Mohiniyattam	Yes	Documentary film about the Indian art form Mohiniyattam
1974	Kanyakumari		
1974	Paathiravum Pakalvelichavum		
1973	Nirmalayam (The Offering)	Yes	Based on the story "Pallivalum Kalchilambum"; Also produced the film under the banner of Novel Films
1971	Kuttiyedathi		
1971	Mappusakshi		
1971	Vithukal (Seeds)		
1970	Nizhalattam (Shadow Play)		
1969	Olavum Theeravum		Based on the story of the same name
1968	Asuravithu		Based on the novel of the same name
1967	Nagarame Nandi		Partially based on the films The Conquerors of the Golden City (1965) and Birds of Exile (1964)
1966	Iruttinte Athmavu		Based on the story of the same name
1966	Pakalkkinavu		
1965	Murappennu		
—	Evideyo Oru Shathru		An incomplete feature film starring Sukumaran and Venu Nagavalli. The screenplay was published in Chilla magazine and later released as a book by Mathrubhumi Books. This book has some stills from the movie.

== See also ==
- List of Indian writers
