= Manju (novel) =

Book by M.T Vasudevan Nair

- Author: M. T. Vasudevan Nair
- Language: Malayalam
- Genre: Novel
- Publisher: DC Books
- Publication date: 1964
- Publication place: India
- Media type: Print

Manju (Mist) is a novel by Indian author and filmmaker M. T. Vasudevan Nair published in 1964. With few conversations and minimal characters, it narrates the story of a school teacher. The novel is set in the mountains and valleys of Nainital where Vimala Devi, a teacher at a boarding school, waits in hope for the winter of her discontent to vanish. Despite having a family comprising a father, mother, sister, and brother, Vimala stays aloof from them. She hates the company of her family and enjoys solitude. The eco-feminist theme of patriarchal domination and exploitation gains more prominence in Manju, MT's only novel with a female protagonist. The novel stands apart as it is set in a milieu different from the usual one, the Valluvanadan village.

The plot of the novel is allegedly similar to a Hindi story Parinde (Birds, 1956), by Nirmal Verma. However both MT and Verma have rejected these claims. MT said in an interview with India Today, "I don't remember having ever read Verma's story although we are very close friends. I wrote Manju immediately after I returned from a visit to Nainital." Verma himself says it is ridiculous to accuse an author of MT's calibre of plagiarism. "My story's English translation was published only five or six years ago by HarperCollins. I don't think MT reads Hindi works in original. So there is no substance to the charge that MT had read it before he wrote his novel," says Verma.

MT also directed and scripted a film with the same name based on the novel in 1983. The film stars Sangeeta Naik, Sankar Mohan, Sankara Pillai, and Nanditha Bose. The novel also had a Hindi-language film adaptation titled Sharad Sandhya which went completely unnoticed.
