= Razi Muhammed =

- Education: Film and Television Institute of India
- Occupation: Filmmaker
- Years active: 2002- present

Razi Muhammed is an Indian film maker based in Kerala, India. Razi Muhammed did his BFA in Applied Arts at College of Fine Arts Trivandrum and his MFA in Illustration and Photography at Maharaja Sayajirao University of Baroda. Then joined in Film and Television Institute of India and got his Diploma in Cinema with specialisation in Scenic Design in first class with first rank.

He directed Velutha Rathrikal, an adaptation of Fyodor Dostoevsky's White Nights.
