= Kadavu (film) =

Kadavu (The Ferry)
- Directed by: M. T. Vasudevan Nair
- Screenplay by: M. T. Vasudevan Nair
- Based on: Kadathuthoni by S. K. Pottekkatt
- Produced by: M. T. Vasudevan Nair
- Starring: Santhosh Antony; Balan K. Nair; Monisha
- Cinematography: Venu
- Edited by: B. Lenin
- Music by: Rajeev Taranath
- Production company: Novel Films
- Release date: 1991
- Running time: 104 minutes
- Country: India
- Language: Malayalam

Kadavu (English: The Ferry Slip) is a 1991 Indian Malayalam film scripted, directed and produced by M. T. Vasudevan Nair based on S. K. Pottekkatt's story Kadathuthoni. The film won numerous awards at state, national and international levels, including awards at the Singapore International Film Festival and Tokyo International Film Festival. Film critic Kozhikodan included the film on his list of the 10 best Malayalam movies of all time.

== Plot ==
Deserted by his mother, teenaged Raju is adopted by Beeranikka, a Muslim ferryman. Raju soon starts accompanying Beeranikka in ferrying people. One day, he meets a young girl who is returning to her native town Kozhikode after the death of her mother. The girl invites Raju to Kozhikode where she would be staying with her father and uncle. Not interested in leaving the ferrying job, Raju rejects the invitation. A few days later, he finds himself in possession of an ornament which he thinks belongs to the girl. He travels to Kozhikode to return the ornament and finds the girl after many days of search. The girl says she does not recognise Raju and says the ornament does not belong to her. Disheartened, Raju returns to the ferry.

== Cast ==
- Santhosh Antony as Raju. The lead character Raju was portrayed by Santhosh Antony. A native of Koodaranhi in Kozhikode district, this was Santhosh's only film.
- Balan K. Nair as Beeran
- Monisha as Devi
- Sreedevi Unni as Amina
- Murali as Rahman
- Thilakan as Krishnettan
- Ravi Vallathol as Maash
- Nedumudi Venu as the anchorite
- Jagathy Sreekumar as the hawker
- Savithri Sreedharan
- R. K. Nair as the goon
- Kunjandi as Taxi driver
- Bhagya Roopa as the girl
- Biyon as Appu

== Awards ==
International awards

- Special Jury Award at Singapore International Film Festival
- Asia Future Prize at Tokyo International Film Festival

National Film Awards

- Best Screenplay
- Best Feature Film in Malayalam

Kerala State Film Awards

- Best Film
- Best Screenplay
- Best Child Artist - Santhosh Antony
