= Nilambur Balan =

Indian actor

- Born: Vadakara
- Died: 4 February 1990
- Occupation: Film actor
- Years active: 1965–1989
- Spouse: Vijayalakshmi
- Children: Santhosh, Vijayakumar, Asha
- Parent(s): Pokkan, Lakshmi

Nilambur Balan was an Indian actor in Malayalam movies. He was one of the prominent supporting actor in late 1960s and 1970s in Malayalam movies. He has acted in more than 50 movies.

== Biography ==
He was born in Vatakara. He was a theater artist before becoming a cine artist. Balan acted in many films, including the Sankupushpam. He was married to Vjayalakshmi on 8 December 1957. They started a drama troupe, Kalithara, and acted together in many dramas. His wife is Kerala State Theater Award-winning actress. The couple has three children, Santhosh, Vijayakumar, and Asha. He died on 4 February 1990. An award established in memory of actor Nilambur Balan by the Nilambur Balan Anusmarana Samithi is presented to individuals in recognition of their contributions to the fields of theater and cinema.

== Partial filmography ==
=== As an actor ===
- Moonnilonnu (1996) .... Nambiar
- Alicinte Anveshanam (1989)
- Padippura (1989)
- Ore Thoovalppakshikal (1988)
- Kanakambarangal (1988)
- Dhwani (1988)
- Janangalude Sredhakku (1987)
- Chanthayil Choodi Vilkkunna Pennu (1987)
- Amma Ariyaan (1986)
- Ilaneer (1981)
- Anyarude Bhoomi (1979)
- Bandhanam (1978)
- Kaathirunna Nimisham (1978) .... Ashan
- Chuvanna Vithukal (1978)
- Vayanaadan Thampan (1978)
- Choondakkari (1977)
- Yatheem (1977)
- Sankhupushpam (1977)
- Mohavum Mukthiyum (1977)
- Mohiniyaattam (1976)
- Ajayanum Vijayanum (1976)
- Chottaanikkara Amma (1976)
- Criminals (Kayangal) (1975)
- Kalyaanappanthal (1975)
- Chandanachola (1975)
- Love Letter (1975)
- Chattambikkalyaani (1975)...James
- Nadeenadanmaare Aavasyamundu (1974)
- Swargaputhri (1973)
- Chuzhi (1973)
- Maram (1973)
- Aaraadhika (1973)
- Panimudakku (1972)
- Kuttyedathi (1971)
- Nizhalaattam (1970)
- Olavum Theeravum (1970)
- Asuravithu (1968)
- Pakalkkinaavu (1966)
- Murappennu (1965)

=== Direction ===
- Anyarude Bhoomi (1979)

== Recipients of Nilumbur Balan Award ==
- 2014 Santha Devi
- 2013 Karanthoor
- 2011 Kuttyedathi Vilasini
- 2009 Mamukkoya
- 2002 Nilambur Ayisha
- 1998 K. T. Mohammed
