= Santha Devi =

Indian actress (1942–2010)

- Born: Damayanthi; 1927; Kozhikode, Kerala, India
- Died: November 20, 2010 (aged 82–83); Kozhikode
- Occupation: Actress
- Years active: 1954–2010
- Spouse(s): Balakrishnan (divorced); Kozhikode Abdul Kader

Damayanthi (1927 – 20 November 2010), better known by her stage name Kozhikode Santha Devi, was an Indian Malayalam-language film and stage actress. In a career of about sixty years, she acted in more than 1,000 plays and about 480 films.

== Biography ==
Santha Devi was born in Kozhikode in 1927 to Thottathil Kannakkuruppu and Karthiyayani Amma.

She made her acting debut in the 1954 stage play Smarakam and her cinema debut in Minnaminungu (1957), directed by Ramu Karyat. She acted in over 480 movies including Moodupadam, Kuttikkuppayam, Kunjalimaraykkar, Iruttinte Athmavu, Sthalathe pradhana payyans and Adwaitham. The 2009 Kerala Cafe, produced by director Ranjith, was her last movie.

Devi died on 20 November 2010 evening at a hospital in Kozhikode.

== Family ==
She had five brothers and four sisters. At the age of 18 she married her uncle's son, Balakrishnan, a railway guard. He divorced Devi after the couple had a son, Suresh Babu. Later, she married Kozhikode Abdul Kader, a popular Malayalam playback singer and had one more son, the late Sathyajith.

== Awards and honours ==
Devi won the Kerala Sangeetha Nataka Akademi Award (1978), the Kerala Sangeetha Nataka Akademi Fellowship (2003), the National Film Award for Best Supporting Actress for her performance in Yamanam (1992), and the Kerala Film Critics Association Award in 1979 and Kerala State Award for Best Actress in State plays in 1983 for Deepasthambham Mahashcharyam.

== Filmography (partial) ==
Malayalam# Sandehi (1954)

1. Minnaminigu(1957)
2. Ninamaninja Kalpadukal (1963)
3. Moodupadam (1963)
4. Kuttikuppayam (1964)
5. Devalayam (1964)
6. Murappennu(1965) as Madhaviyamma
7. Mayor Nair (1966)
8. Kunjali Marakkar (1967)
9. Nagarame Nandi (1967)
10. Aneshichu Kandethiyilla (1967)
11. Ashwamedam (1967) as Lakshmi
12. Iruttinte Athmavu (1967) as Parukkuttiamma
13. Mulkireedam (1967)
14. Kottayam Kolacase (1967)
15. Aval (1967)
16. Anaachadanam (1968)
17. Thokkukal Kathaparayunnu (1968)
18. Velutha Kathreena (1968)
19. Ummachu (1971)
20. Kuttyedathi(1971) as Meenakshi
21. Iniyoru Janmam Tharoo (1972)
22. Darshanam (1973)
23. Shasthram Jayichu Manushyan Thottu (1973)
24. Udayam Kizhakku Thanne (1974)
25. Nirmala (1975 film) (1975)
26. Utharayanam (1975)
27. Athithi (1975)
28. Njavalppazhangal (1976)
29. Yatheem (1977)
30. Aparadhi (1977) as Madhaviyamma
31. Padasaram (1978) as Kochukaali
32. Chuvanna Vithukal (1978)
33. Avar Jeevikkunnu (1978)
34. Thenthulli (1979)
35. Thakara (1979)
36. Neelathamara (1979)
37. Vilkkanundu Swapnangal (1980)
38. Chakara (1980) as Subhadra
39. Angadi (1980)
40. Ashwaradham (1980)
41. Adhikaram (1980)
42. Mylanji (1982 )
43. Surumayitta Kannukal (1983)
44. Maniyara (1983)
45. Srikrishna Parundu (1984)
46. Anubandham (1985)
47. Dheivatheyorthu (1985)
48. Vellam (1985)
49. Abhayam Thedi (1986)
50. Doore Doore Oru Koodu Koottam (1986)
51. PC 369 (1987) as Mandara
52. Nadodikkaattu (1987) as Ramdas's Mother (Cameo appearance)
53. Idanazhiyil Ou Kalocha (1987)
54. Rithubetham (1987)
55. Oohakachavadam (1988)
56. Dhinarathrangal (1988)
57. Kanakambarangal (1988) as Sreedevi's mother
58. Asthikal Pookkunnu (1989) as Itti
59. Padippura (1989)
60. Chanakyan(1989)
61. V. I. P. (1989) as Karthyayani
62. Alicinte Anveshanam (1989)
63. Naduvazhikal (1989)
64. Carnivel (1989)
65. Aye Auto (1990)
66. Sasneham (1990)
67. Brahmarakshassu (1990)
68. Kakkathollayiram (1990)
69. No 20 Madras Mail (1990)
70. Aakoshakkottayile Sulthan (1991)
71. Parallel College (1991)
72. Adwaitham (1991)
73. Daivasahayam Lucky Centre (1991)
74. Dhanam (1991)
75. Kamaladalam (1992)
76. Yamanam (1992)
77. Magrib (1993)
78. Agneyam (1993)
79. Ghoshayathra (1993) as Itheyiumma
80. Sthalathe Pradhana Payyans (1993)
81. Naaraayam (1993)
82. Chukkan (1994) as Gayathri's Mother
83. Bharanakoodam (1994) as Manju's maid
84. Ghazal (1994)
85. Pingami (1994)
86. Tharavadu (1994)
87. Deyvathinte Vikrithikal (1994)
88. Avan Ananthapadmanabhan (1994)
89. Mazhayethum Munbe (1995)
90. Sundari Neeyum Sundaran Njanum (1995)
91. Oru Abhibashakante Case Diary (1995)
92. Sasinas (1995)
93. Chandha (1995)
94. No 1 Snehatheeram Bangalore North (1995)
95. Sundarimare Sookshikkuka (1995)
96. Madamma (1996)
97. Aakaashathekkoru Kilivaathil (1996)
98. Harbour (1996)
99. Mahathma (1996)
100. Suvarna Simhaasanam (1997)
101. Irattakuttikalude Achan (1997) as Valsan's mother
102. Sisiram (1998)
103. Oro Viliyum Kathorthu (1998)
104. Magician Mahendralal From Delhi (1998)
105. Chenaparambile Anakaryam (1998)
106. Priyankari (2000)
107. Rapid Action Force (2000) as Vasanthakumari's muthassi
108. Ninneyum Thedi (2001)
109. Kattu Vannu Vilichappol (2001)
110. Neythukaran (2001)
111. Ee Bhargavi Nilayam (2002)
112. Paadam Onnu: Oru Vilapam (2003)
113. Ammakkilikkoodu (2003)
114. Mizhirandilum (2003)
115. Anyar (2003) as Ummumma
116. Janakeeyam (2003) as Lakshmiyamma
117. Kilichundan Mambhazham (2003) as Maimuna's mother
118. Freedom (2004)
119. Akale (2004) as Typewriting teacher
120. Maratha Nadu (2004)
121. Ullam (2005)
122. Anandabadram (2005)
123. Nottam (2006) as Jankiyamma
124. Mamma (2006) - Short film as Mrs. Philipose
125. Prajapathi (2006)
126. Vilapagalkkappuram (2008)
127. Crazy Gopalan (2008) as Janakiyamma
128. Thalappavu (2008)
129. Mayabazar(2008)
130. Koodaram (2009)
131. Malayali (2009)
132. Kerala Cafe (2009)
133. Nandhuni (2010)
134. Nalla Pattukare (2010)
135. Annarakkannanum Thannalayathu (2010) ... Valiyathan's mother
136. Uthrada Ravu - Short film
137. Kunjipennu (2010) - album
138. Nurunguvettangal - Short film ... Sr. Margarita
139. Tharangal (2014) - photo only

Hindi

- Triyathri (1990)

== Television serials (partial) ==
- Manasi (DD Malayalam)
- Pennurimai (DD Malayalam)
- Chitta (Surya TV)
- Minnukettu (Surya TV)
- Manassariyathe (Surya TV)
- Kayamkulam Kochunni (Surya TV)
- Ali Manthrikan
- Ennapadam
- Sakunam ( DD Malayalam)
- Vadhu - telefilm
- Vidhyarambham - telefilm
- Puthiyaplakkuppayam - telefilm
- Kannukal- telefilm
- Kunchathumma - telefilm

== Dramas (partial) ==
- Kudukkukal
- Smaarakam
- Deepasthambham Mahaascharyam
- Inquilaaabinte Makkal
- Ithu Bhoomiyaannu
- Pediswapnam
