= List of Malayalam films of 1961 =

The following is a list of Malayalam films released in 1961.

The year marked a major technical milestone for Malayalam cinema with the release of its first full-length colour film, Kandam Becha Kottu.

Opening		Sl. no.	Film	Cast	Director	Music director	Notes
J A N
J A N	28	1	Christmas Rathri	T. K. Balachandran, Thikkurissy Sukumaran Nair	P. Subramaniam	Br Lakshmanan	
A P R	14	2	ummini thanka	Sukumari, Kedamangalam Sadanandan	G. Viswanath	V. Dakshinamoorthy	
A U G	24	3	Kandam Bacha Kotte	Thikkurissy Sukumaran Nair, Prem Nawas	T. R. Sundaram	Baburaj	Certificate of Merit for Second Best Feature Film
A U G	24	4	Unniyarcha	Prem Nazir, Sathyan	Kunchacko	K. Raghavan	
A U G	24	5	Arappavan	Sathyan, KPAC Sulochana	K. Shankar	G. K. Venkatesh, P. S. Divakar	
N O V	3	6	Sabarimala Ayyappan	Thikkurissy Sukumaran Nair, Kottarakkara Sreedharan Nair	Shri Ramulu Naidu	S. M. Subbaiah Naidu	Certificate of Merit for Third Best Feature Film
N O V	15	7	Bhaktha Kuchela	C. S. R. Anjaneyulu, Kanta Rao	P. Subramaniam	Br Lakshmanan	
N O V	18	8	Krishna Kuchela	Prem Nazir, Sathyan	Kunchacko	K. Raghavan	
D E C	22	9	Jnaanasundari	Prem Nazir, L. Vijayalakshmi	K. S. Sethumadhavan	V. Dakshinamoorthy	
D E C	22	10	Mudiyanaya Puthran	Sathyan, Adoor Bhasi	Ramu Kariat	M. S. Baburaj	President's Silver Medal for Best Feature Film
