= T. K. Pareekutty =

Indian film producer

- Born: c. 1909; Fort Kochi, Kingdom of Kochi, British India.
- Died: 1969; Kerala, India
- Occupation(s): Film producer, businessman
- Organization: Chandrathara Pictures
- Known for: Neelakuyil (1954), Mudiyanaya Puthran (1961), Thacholi Othenan (1964), Kunjali Marakkar (1967)

T. K. Pareekutty (c. 1909 – 21 July 1969) was an Indian film producer who was active in Malayalam cinema during the 1950s and 1960s. He produced numerous films, including Neelakuyil (1954), Mudiyanaya Puthran (1961), Thacholi Othenan (1964), and Kunjali Marakkar (1967). Pareekutty also introduced Kerala’s first 70 mm theatre in Kochi.

== Biography ==
Pareekutty was born in Fort Kochi in 1909. He began his career in the coir trade and owned a fleet of boats before moving into the film business. In 1952, Pareekutty started a film distribution company under the name Chandrathara Pictures. His first major success was Neelakuyil (1954), co-directed by Ramu Kariat and Bhaskaran. The film is often described as a landmark in Malayalam cinema. It became the first South Indian film to receive the President’s Silver Medal for Best Feature Film. Several of his productions won the National Film Award for Best Feature Film in Malayalam, including Mudiyanaya Puthran (1961), Thacholi Othenan (1964) and Kunjali Marakkar (1967). Beyond film production, Pareekutty also invested in exhibition. He built the Saina Theatre in Fort Kochi, which later became known as Koker’s Theatre, remembered as Kerala’s first 70 mm theatre. Pareekutty died on 21 July 1969.

== Filmography ==
Selected films produced by T. K. Pareekutty
Year	Title	Director(s)	Notes
1954	Neelakuyil	P. Bhaskaran, Ramu Kariat	First Malayalam film to win President’s Silver Medal for Best Feature Film
1956	Rarichan Enna Pauran	P. Bhaskaran	
1961	Mudiyanaya Puthran	Ramu Kariat	National Film Award for Best Feature Film in Malayalam
1963	Moodupadam	Ramu Kariat	
1964	Thacholi Othean	P. Bhaskaran	National Film Award for Best Feature Film in Malayalam
1964	Bhargavi Nilayam	A. Vincent	First horror film in Malayalam cinema
1967	Kunjali Marakkar	S. S. Rajan	National Film Award for Best Feature Film in Malayalam
1969	Aalmaram	A. Vincent	
