= Benni Saradhi =

Malayalam film director

Bennie Saradhi
- Born: Kunnamkulam, Thrissur, Kerala, India
- Died: 15 November 2017
- Occupation: Director
- Years active: 1987 to 2017
- Spouse: Annamma (Molly)
- Children: Vidhu. B. Tholath, Anju Bennie

Bennie Saradhi was a Malayalam film director. He had directed Manjukalavum Kazhinju, released in 1998. He had also directed the "Abhinethri", "Ashtabandham", "Nilamazha" Malayalam tele series.

== Personal life ==
Bennie Saradhi was born to Ukkru and Lilly, Tholath house at Kizhoor, Kunnamkulam in Thrissur district, Kerala, India. He had married to Annamma (Molly) and he has two children, Vidhu. B. Tholath & Anju Bennie.

== Career ==
Bennie started his career through the film Uppu directed by Pavthran as an associate director. He had also worked with K. R. Mohanan and T. V. Chandran for numerous films including Utharam, Ponthan Mada, Dany, Susanna, Paadam Onnu: Oru Vilapam, Alicinte Anveshanam. He directed a short film Aamam, based on C.V. Sreeraman's short story. and had made a documentary film about Mohammad Sabir Baburaj, a Malayalam music composer. He was the President of "Nanma", an organization for all Malayalam film workers.

== Filmography ==
- Manjukalavum Kazhinju (1998)
- Paadam Onnu: Oru Vilapam (2003)
- Dany (2001)
- Susanna (2000)
- Ponthan Mada (1994)
- Alicinte Anveshanam (1989)
- Utharam (1989)
- Uppu (1987) (as associate director)

== Tele-series ==
- Abhinethri
- Ashtabandham
- Nilamazha
