= Ummachu (film) =

- Directed by: P. Bhaskaran
- Written by: Uroob
- Based on: Ummachu by Uroob
- Produced by: Tarachand Barjatya
- Starring: Madhu; Sheela; Adoor Bhasi; Master Sathyajith
- Cinematography: C. Ramachandra Menon
- Edited by: K. Narayanan
- Music by: K. Raghavan
- Production company: Swargam
- Release date: 19 November 1971
- Country: India
- Language: Malayalam

Ummachu is a 1971 Indian Malayalam-language film, directed by P. Bhaskaran and produced by Tarachand Barjatya. The film stars Madhu, Sheela, Adoor Bhasi and Master Sathyajith. It is an adaptation of Uroob's novel of the same name (1954). Uroob won the Kerala State Film Award for Best Story.

== Cast ==
- Madhu as Mayan
- Sheela as Ummachu
- Adoor Bhasi as Hydrose
- Master Sathyajith
- T. R. Omana
- Raghavan as Abdu
- Kunjava
- Nellikode Bhaskaran as Beeran
- Philomina
- Santha Devi
- Vidhubala (debut) as Chinnammu
- Bahadoor
- Sankaradi
- C. A. Balan
- Haji Abdul Rahman
- Latheef
- Nambiar
- Abu
- Salam
- Krishnankutty
- Vasunni
- Chemancheri Narayanan Nair
- Haridas
- Master Krishnakumar
- Master Jayaraj
- Master Sathyajith
- Master Koyatti
- Master Abdul Nassar
- Kamala
- Thankam
- Baby Sobha
- Baby Aminu

== Soundtrack ==
The music was composed by K. Raghavan and the lyrics were written by P. Bhaskaran.

No.	Song	Singers	Lyrics	Length
1	"Aattinakkareyakkare"	K. J. Yesudas	P. Bhaskaran	
2	"Aattinakkareyakkare" (Sad)	K. J. Yesudas	P. Bhaskaran	
3	"Ekaantha Padhikan Njaan"	P. Jayachandran	P. Bhaskaran	
4	"Kalpakathoppanyanoruvanu"	K. J. Yesudas	P. Bhaskaran	
5	"Kiliye Kiliye"	B Vasantha	P. Bhaskaran	
6	"Veenakkambi Thakarnnaal"	S. Janaki	P. Bhaskaran	
