= Mehboob (singer) =

H. Mehboob
- Also known as: H. Mehboob, Mehboob Bhai
- Born: Mehboob Khan; 1926; Pattalam, Fort Kochi
- Origin: Kochi, Kingdom of Cochin (now in Kerala, India)
- Died: 22 April 1981 (aged 54–55)
- Genre: Playback singing
- Occupations: Singer, songwriter, Actor
- Years active: 1951–1980

H. Mehboob (1926–22 April, 1981) was an Indian musician and playback singer. He was one of the most successful playback singers in the Malayalam film industry during the 1950s and early 1960s, with a number of hit songs to his credit.

== Biography ==
Mehboob was born in Mattancherry, Kingdom of Cochin (now part of India).

Mehboob grew up to become a singer. He made his name, friends and admirers through singing. He had no real home, but he lived with his friends. Many of his early songs were written by Mepalli Balan and Nelson Fernandes, with that special Mattancherry flavour. These songs were never recorded. It was Pankaj Mullick who recognised Mehboob's singing ability for the first time. He recommended Mehboob for several "Kacheris" and Mohammed Rafi concerts.

Mehboob became quite famous throughout Cochin in the late 1940s. Cochin-based actor Muthiah recommended Mehboob to music director Dakshinamoorthy, who was looking for a new voice for the film Jeevitha Nouka. Mehboob recorded three songs, including the popular "Akaale Aarum Kaividum" for this film, widely known to be the first superhit film in Malayalam. (This song was a ditto copy of "Suhani Raat Dhal Chuki" from Dulari. It was later re-recorded by K. J. Yesudas in 1985, and this version is featured in the currently available prints of the film.) With the success of this song, Mehboob shot to fame and became the most sought after singer of that time. In 1954, he recorded "Manennum Vilikkila" for the landmark film Neelakkuyil, which became a tremendous success. He went on to record numerous hit songs for composers M. S. Baburaj, K. Raghavan, G. Devarajan, R. K. Shekhar and many more. Most of his songs were folk music based comic numbers and had lyrics by P. Bhaskaran.

Mehboob has also recorded numerous songs for stage plays, gramophone records and other programmes, which is perhaps many times more than he recorded for films. He was also an inevitable performer in "Mehfils" and other concerts. Mehboob was never a careerist. He was known to be an alcoholic and finally died a nearly impoverished man, aged 56. H. Mehboob road in Mattancherry, Kerala, was named after Mehboob, to pay respect to his contribution in the field of music and also as his remembrance.

Many of his songs were remixed and used in later Malayalam films. A part of the song "Theerchaayilla Janam", written by Kannan Pareekutty and sung in 1956, was rendered by actor Mohanlal for the 1999 film Ustaad . The 2013 film Annayum Rasoolum used the songs "Kandu Randu Kannu" (composed by M. S. Baburaj and written by P. A. Kasim for the 1973 film Chuzhi) and "Kayalinarike" (written by Meppalli Balan). The 2013 film ABCD: American-Born Confused Desi featured the song "Nayapaisayilla" from the film Neelisally (1960).

== Notable songs ==
- "Akaale Arum Kaividum" (Jeevitha Nouka)
- "Arakka Roopa" (Neelisally)
- "Halu Pidichoru Puliachhan Pulivalupidichoru Nairachan" (Nairu Pidicha Pulivalu)
- "Ee Chiriyum Chiriyalla" (Subaida)
- "Ellaarum Thattanu Muttanu" (Mudiyanaya Puthran)
- "Enthoru Thontharavu" (Moodupadam)
- "Kathu Sookshiochore Kasthuri Mampazham" (Nairu Pidicha Pulivalu)
- "Kandam Bechoru Kottanu Athu Mammad Kakkede Kottanu" (Kandam Bacha Kotte)
- "Kayalinarike Kodikalparathi Kuthichu pongiya Kapalukal"
- "Kandu Randu Kannu" (Chuzhi)
- "Keledi Ninne Njan" (Doctor (1963 film)
- "Kollaan Nadakkana" (Subaida)
- "Kozhikodangdeele Koyakkande Kadayilu Koyinde Kariyude Charu" (Thankakudam)
- "Manennum Vilikkila Mayilennum Vilikkila" (Neelakuyil)
- "Naya Paisayilla Kayyiloru Naya Paisayilla" (Neelisally)
- "O Rikshawalla" (Odayil Ninnu)
- "Pandu Pandu Ninne Kanda Nalilla" (Rarichan Enna Pauran)
- "Saayippe Saayippe Aslam Alaikkum" (Pazhassi Raja)
- "Thinakkam Theyyakkam" (Mudiyanaya Puthran)
- "Vandi Vandi Ninne Pole Vayaril Enikkum Theeyanu (Doctor)
- "Vandikkaran Beerankakka Randam Kettinu Poothim Bechu" (Porter Kunjali)
- "Zindabad Zindabad Swantham Karyam Zindabad" (Kandam Bacha Kotte)
