= J. A. R. Anand =

Indian actor

- Born: Jacoob Abdu Rahman Anand; Mattancherry, Kochi
- Occupation: Film actor
- Years active: 1954–1986
- Spouse: Khadeeja
- Children: Sabitha Anand, 10 others

Jacoob Abdu Rahman Anand was an Indian actor in Malayalam movies during the 1960s and 1970s. His popular movies are Neelakuyil, Chemmeen, Snehaseema, Rarichan Enna Pauran and Randidangazhi. South Indian actress Sabitha Anand is his daughter.

== Background ==
Abdu Rahman with the stage name J. A. R. Anand was born as eldest son, to Jacoob and Haleemaumma, at Mattancherry, Kochi. He has two sisters and three brothers. He was a theater actor turned movie actor. Pachakodi was his debut drama. He had acted dramas in Hindi, Tamil, Urdu, English and Gujarati languages. National award-winning movie Neelakuyil was his debut film. He portrayed important roles in Mudiyanan puthran, Doctor, Rajamalli, Chekuthante Kotta and Nellu. He was married to Khadeeja, and had eleven children. Actress Sabitha Anand was his daughter. He died in 1992 at Chennai.

== Partial filmography ==
- Poomukhapadiyil Ninneyumkathu (1986)
- Sreedevi (1977)
- Aadyapaadam (1977)
- Ponni (1976)
- Chattambikkalyaani (1975) as Khader
- Criminals (Kayangal) (1975)
- Raajahamsam (1974)
- Nellu (1974)
- Achaani (1973)
- Chuzhi (1973)
- Manushyabandhangal (1972)
- Chekuthaante Kotta (1967)
- Rajamalli (1965)
- Devaalayam (1964)
- Oraal Koodi Kallanaayi (1964)
- Doctor (1963)
- Ammaye Kaanaan (1963)
- Mudiyanaaya Puthran (1961)
- Neelakkuyil (1954)
