= C. Ramachandra Menon =

- Born: 26 January 1929; Chalappuram, Kozhikode; Kerala, India
- Died: 9 May 2017 (aged 88); Chalappuram, Kozhikode; Kerala, India
- Occupation: Cinematographer
- Spouse: Malathi Ramachandran
- Children: Maya Harigovind; Goutham Menon
- Parent(s): P. K. M. Raja, Chengalath Janakiamma
- Awards: 1971 - Best Cinematographer - Ummachu

C. Ramachandra Menon was a South Indian cinematographer known for shooting more than 150 films in Malayalam and Tamil. He was the cinematographer for Ummachu (1971), based on the novel of the same name, and is also known for his work on Eeta and Ningalenne Communistakki (1970). He frequently collaboratedwith Sreekumaran Thambi, P. Bhaskaran and Kunchacko on Malayalam films.

== Personal life and career ==
He was born as the son of P. K. M. Raja of Thiruvannoor Kovilakam and Chengalath Janakiyamma in 1929 at Kozhikode. He worked with Markus Bartley; Masthan; and Melli Irani at Vahini Studios, Chennai. In 1956, he went to Singapore. There, he worked with Singapore Television for around six years making Malay films. He returned home in 1970 and worked at Udaya studio. He was married to Manchapora Malathi, and had two children: Maya Harigovind (married to Chengalath Harigovind) and Dr. Goutham Menon (married to Dr. Maureen Rubin). He died on 9 May 2017.

== Filmography ==
Movie	Year	Director	Producer
Thara	1970	M. Krishnan Nair	Kunchacko
Ningalenne Communistaaki	1970	Thoppil Bhasi	Kunchacko
Othenante Makan	1970	Kunchacko	Kunchacko
Dahthuputhran	1970	Kunchacko	Kunchacko
Raathrivandi	1971	Vijayanarayan	A. Ragunath
Muthassi	1971	P Baskaran	Sargam Pictures
Eranakulam Junction	1971	Vijayanarayan	A. Raghunath
Ummaachu	1971	P Bhaskaran	Tharachand Bharjathya
Sathi	1972	Madhu	Madhu
Soundarya Pooja	1973	B. K Pottekkad	Muthappan Movies
Abhinandanam	1976	I. V. Sasi	A. Raghunath
Mayor Meenakshi	1976	Madurai Thirumaran	Ashok Brothers
Muttathe Mulla	1977	J. Sasikumar	Thiruppathi Chettiyar
Innale Innu	1977	I. V. Sasi	Thiruppathi Chettiyar
Akale Aakaasham	1977	I. V. Sasi	Thiruppathi Chettiyar
Anjali	1977	I. V. Sasi	A. Raghunath
Aasheervaadam	1977	I. V. Sasi	Thayyil Kunjikandan
Sangamam	1977	Hariharan	Sahrudaya Films
Ninakku Njaanum Enikku Neeyum	1978	J. Sasikumar	Thiruppathi Chettiyar
Mattoru Karnan	1978	J. Sasikumar	Gayathri Combines
Kalpavriksham	1978	J. Sasikumar	T. K. K. Nambiar
Anumodanam	1978	I. V. Sasi	Thayyil Kunjikandan
Kanalkattakal	1978	A. B. Raj	Thomas Abraham
Padakkuthira	1978	P. G. Vasudevan	Malithra Production
Sathrusamhaaram	1978	J. Sasikumar	Kaval Surendran
Ithaa Oru Manushayn	1978	I. V. Sasi	Hemnag Productions
Eetta	1978	I. V. Sasi	Cherupushpam Films
Itha Oru Theerum	1979	P. G. Viswambharan	O. M. John
Nithya Vasantham	1979	J. Sasikumar	Murahari Films
Yakshi Paaru	1979	K. G. Rajasekharan	Evershine
Ormayil Nee Mathram	1979	J. Sasikumar	R. Devarajan
Ivide Kaatinu Sugandam	1979	P. G. Vishwambharan	Yuvachetana films
Vellaayani Paramu	1979	J. Sasikumar	E.K. Thyagarajan
Raagam Thaanam Pallavi	1980	A. T. Abu	Amrutha Movies
Kadalkkaattu	1980	P. G. Vishwambharan	Sherif Kottarakkara
Chaakara	1980	P. G. Vishwambharan	Thushara Films
Theenaalangal	1980	J. Sasikumar	Parvathi Arts Pictures
Ammayum Makalum	1980	Stanley Jose	B&V Productions
Naayaattu	1980	Sreekumaran Thampi	Hemnag Productions
Vayal	1981	Antony Eastman	M. D. Mathew
Saahasam	1981	K. G. Rajasekharan	Thiruppathi Chettiyar
Dhruvasangamam	1981	J. Sasikumar	Velamkanni International
Thaaraavu	1981	Jeassy	N. Premkumar; N. K. Ramachandran
Arikkaari Ammu	1981	Sreekumaran Thampi	N. R. Sasikumara Kurup
Greeshmajwaala	1981	P. G. Vishwambharan	Supreme Production
Enthino Pookkunna Pookal	1982	Gopinath Babu	Rajath Chithra
Enikkum Oru Divasam	1982	Sreekumaran Thampi	Sreekumaran Thampi
Gaanam	1982	Sreekumaran Thampi	Sreekumaran Thampi
Chambalkaadu	1982	K. G. Rajasekharan	NK Productions
Chilanthivala	1982	Vijayanand	A. Ragunath
Irattimadhuram	1982	Sreekumaran Thampi	Sreekumaran Thampi
Shaari Alla Shaarada	1982	K. G. Rajasekharan	
Deepaaradhana	1983	Vijayanad	T. K. Balachandran
Vaashi	1983	M. R. Joseph	Manjeri Chandran, Padiyath Ahammed Kutty
Aadhipathyam	1983	Sreekumaran Thampi	
Ningalil Oru Sthree	1984	A. B. Raj	
Swanthamevide Bandhamevide	1984	J. Sasikumar	
Karimbu	1984	K. Vijayan	
Oru Naal Innorunaal	1985	T. S. Suresh Babu	
Orikkal Oridathu	1985	Jeassy	
Yuvajanolsavam	1986	Sreekumaran Thampi	
Amme Bhagavathi	1986	Sreekumaran Thampi	
Sanghunadam	1988	T. S. Sureshbabu	
