= National Film Award for Best Malayalam Feature Film =

Indian film award

- National award for contributions to Indian Cinema
- Awarded for: Best Malayalam feature film of the year
- Sponsored by: National Film Development Corporation of India
- Formerly called: President's Silver Medal for Best Feature Film in Malayalam (1954–1968); National Film Award for Best Feature Film in Malayalam (1969–2021)
- Rewards: Rajat Kamal (Silver Lotus); ₹2,00,000
- First award: 1954
- Most recent winner: Feminichi Fathima (2024)

The National Film Award for Best Malayalam Feature Film is one of the National Film Awards presented annually by the National Film Development Corporation of India. It is one of several awards presented for feature films and awarded with Rajat Kamal (Silver Lotus). Since the 70th National Film Awards, the name was changed to "Best Malayalam Feature Film".

The National Film Awards, established in 1954, are the most prominent film awards in India that merit the best of the Indian cinema. The ceremony also presents awards for films in various regional languages.

Awards for films in seven regional language (Bengali, Hindi, Kannada, Malayalam, Marathi, Tamil and Telugu) started from 2nd National Film Awards which were presented on 21 December 1955. Three awards of "President's Silver Medal for Best Feature Film", "Certificate of Merit for the Second Best Feature Film" and "Certificate of Merit for the Third Best Feature Film" were instituted. The later two certificate awards were discontinued from 15th National Film Awards (1967).

The first winner of the "President's Silver Medal for Best Feature Film in Malayalam" was the 1954 film Neelakuyil. Jointly directed by P. Bhaskaran and Ramu Kariat, the film was based on a story written by Malayalam writer Uroob. It told the story of a love affair between a Dalit girl and an educated, high caste school teacher. The film is considered a landmark in Malayalam cinema history. Along with Neelakuyil, S. S. Rajan directed film Sneha Seema was honoured with a Certificate of Merit. Following is the list of Silver Lotus Award (Rajat Kamal) recipient films produced in Malayalam language.

== Winners ==
Award includes 'Rajat Kamal' (Silver Lotus Award) and cash prize. Following are the award winners over the years:

Awards legends
*	President's Silver Medal for Best Feature Film
*	Certificate of Merit for the Second Best Feature Film
*	Certificate of Merit for the Third Best Feature Film
*	Certificate of Merit for the Best Feature Film
*	Indicates a joint award for that year

List of award films, showing the year (award ceremony), producer(s) and director(s)
Year	Film(s)	Producer(s)	Director(s)	Refs.
1954 (2nd)	Neelakuyil	Chandrathara Productions	• P. Bhaskaran • Ramu Kariat	
1954 (2nd)	Snehaseema	Associate Pictures	S. S. Rajan	
1955 (3rd)	No Award			
1956 (4th)	No Award			
1957 (5th)	Padatha Painkili	Neela Productions	P. Subramaniam	
1958 (6th)	Nairu Pidicha Pulivalu	T. E. Vasudevan	P. Bhaskaran	
1958 (6th)	Randidangazhi	Neela Productions	P. Subramaniam	
1959 (7th)	Chathurangam	Capt. (Dr.) G. T. Joshua	• J. D. Thottan • D. V. Swamy	
1960 (8th)	No Award			
1961 (9th)	Mudiyanaya Puthran	Chandrathara Productions	Ramu Kariat	
1961 (9th)	Kandam Becha Kottu	Modern Theatres	T. R. Sundaram	
1961 (9th)	Sabarimala Ayyappan	K. Kuppuswamy	S. M. Sriramulu Naidu	
1962 (10th)	Puthiya Akasam Puthiya Bhoomi	Associated Producers	M. S. Mani	
1962 (10th)	Kalpadukal	T. R. Raghavan	K. S. Anthony	
1963 (11th)	Ninamaninja Kalpadukal	K. V. Bhavadas, N. K. Karunakara Pillai and K. Parameshwaran Nair	N. N. Pisharody	
1963 (11th)	Doctor	H. H. Ebrahim	M. S. Mani	
1963 (11th)	Kalayum Kaminiyum	Neela Productions	P. Subramaniam	
1964 (12th)	Aadyakiranangal	P. Bhaskaran and V. Abdullah	P. Bhaskaran	
1964 (12th)	Kudumbini	P. A. Thomas and J. Sasikumar	P. A. Thomas and J. Sasikumar	
1964 (12th)	Thacholi Othenan	T. K. Pareekutty	S. S. Rajan	
1965 (13th)	Kavyamela	T. E. Vasudevan	M. Krishnan Nair	
1965 (13th)	Odayil Ninnu	P. Ramaswamy	K. S. Sethumadhavan	
1965 (13th)	Murappennu	K. Parameswaran Nair	A. Vincent	
1966 (14th)	Kunjali Marikkar	T. K. Pareekutty	S. S. Rajan	
1967 (15th)	Anveshichu Kandethiyilla	K. Ravindran Nair	P. Bhaskaran	
1968 (16th)	Adhyapika	Neela Productions	P. Subramaniam	
1969 (17th)	Adimakal	M. O. Joseph	K. S. Sethumadhavan	
1970 (18th)	Ezhuthatha Kadha	Jai Maruthy Pictures	A. B. Raj	
1971 (19th)	Karakanakadal	Hari Pothan	K. S. Sethumadhavan	
1972 (20th)	Panitheeratha Veedu	K. S. R. Moorthy	K. S. Sethumadhavan	
1973 (21st)	Gayathri	A. R. Shreedharan Elayidom and P. B. Ashram	P. N. Menon	
1974 (22nd)	Uttarayanam	Pattathuvila Karunakaran	G. Aravindan	
1975 (23rd)	Swapnadanam	T. Mohamed Bapu	K. G. George	
1976 (24th)	Manimuzhakkam	Cartoonist Thomas	P. A. Backer	
1977 (25th)	Kodiyettam	Kulathoor Bhaskaran Nair	Adoor Gopalakrishnan	
1978 (26th)	Thampu	K. Ravindran Nair	G. Aravindan	
1979 (27th)	Peruvazhiyambalam	Prem Prakash	Padmarajan	
1980 (28th)	Yagam	B. Chandramani Bai	Sivan	
1981 (29th)	Elippathayam	K. Ravindran Nair	Adoor Gopalakrishnan	
1982 (30th)	Chappa	P. K. Abdul Latif	P. A. Backer	
1983 (31st)	Malamukalile Daivam	Surya Mudra Films	P. N. Menon	
1984 (32nd)	Mukhamukham	K. Ravindran Nair	Adoor Gopalakrishnan	
1985 (33rd)	Thinkalaazhcha Nalla Divasam	M. Mani	P. Padmarajan	
1986 (34th)	Uppu	K. M. A. Rahim	V. K. Pavithran	
1987 (35th)	Purushartham	P. T. K. Mohammad	K. R. Mohanan	
1988 (36th)	Rugmini	S. C. Pillai and Gigy Abraham	K. P. Kumaran	
1989 (37th)	Mathilukal	Adoor Gopalakrishnan	Adoor Gopalakrishnan	
1990 (38th)	Vasthuhara	T. Ravindranath	G. Aravindan	
1991 (39th)	Kadavu	M. T. Vasudevan Nair	M. T. Vasudevan Nair	
1992 (40th)	Swaroopam	P. T. K. Mohammed	K. R. Mohanan	
1993 (41st)	Vidheyan	K. Ravi	Adoor Gopalakrishnan	
1994 (42nd)	Sukrutham	M. M. Ramachandran	Harikumar	
1995 (43rd)	Ormakalundayirikkanam	Salam Karassery	T. V. Chandran	
1996 (44th)	Desadanam	Jayaraj	Jayaraj	
1997 (45th)	Mangamma	NFDC	T. V. Chandran	
1998 (46th)	Agnisakshi	Srishti Films	Shyamaprasad	
1999 (47th)	Punaradhivasam	N. P. Prakash	V. K. Prakash	
2000 (48th)	Sayanam	M. P. Sukumaran Nair	M. P. Sukumaran Nair	
2000 (48th)	Kochu Kochu Santhoshangal	Grihalakshmi Films	Sathyan Anthikad	
2001 (49th)	Dany	T. V. Chandran	T. V. Chandran	
2002 (50th)	Nizhalkuthu	Adoor Gopalakrishnan	Adoor Gopalakrishnan	
2003 (51st)	Saphalam	Anil Thomas	Asok R. Nath	
2004 (52nd)	Akale	Tom George Kolath	Shyamaprasad	
2005 (53rd)	Thanmathra	Century Films	Blessy	
2006 (54th)	Drishtantham	M. P. Sukumaran Nair	M. P. Sukumaran Nair	
2007 (55th)	Ore Kadal	Vindhyan N. B.	Shyamaprasad	
2008 (56th)	Thirakkatha	Varnachithra Big Screen	Ranjith	
2009 (57th)	Keralavarma Pazhassiraja	A. M. Gopalan	T. Hariharan	
2010 (58th)	Veettilekkulla Vazhi	B. C. Joshi	Dr. Biju	
2011 (59th)	Indian Rupee	August Cinema	Ranjith	
2012 (60th)	Celluloid	Kamal and Ubaid	Kamal	
2013 (61st)	North 24 Kaatham	C. V. Sarathi	Anil Radhakrishnan Menon	
2014 (62nd)	Ain	1:1.3 Entertainments	Sidhartha Siva	
2015 (63rd)	Pathemari	Allens Media	Salim Ahamed	
2016 (64th)	Maheshinte Prathikaaram	Dream Mill Cinemas and Entertainment Pvt. Ltd.	Dileesh Pothan	
2017 (65th)	Thondimuthalum Driksakshiyum	Urvasi Theatres	Dileesh Pothan	
2018 (66th)	Sudani from Nigeria	Happy Hours Entertainments	Zakariya Mohammed	
2019 (67th)	Kalla Nottam	First Print Studio	Rahul Riji Nair	
2020 (68th)	Thinkalazhcha Nishchayam	Pushkar Films	Senna Hegde	
2021 (69th)	Home	Vijay Babu	Rojin Thomas	
2022 (70th)	Saudi Vellakka	Urvashi Theatres	Tharun Moorthy	
2023 (71st)	Ullozhukku	RSVP Movies and MacGuffin Pictures	Christo Tomy	
2024 (72nd)	Feminichi Fathima	Fasil Muhammed	Fasil Muhammed	
