= Moodupadam =

- Theatrical poster
- Directed by: Ramu Kariat
- Written by: S. K. Pottekkatt (story); K. T. Muhammed (screenplay & dialogues); K. Padmanabhan Nair (dialogues)
- Produced by: T. K. Pareekutty
- Starring: Sathyan; Ambika
- Cinematography: A. Vincent
- Edited by: G. Venkitaraman
- Music by: Baburaj
- Production company: Chandrathara Productions
- Distributed by: Chandrathara Pictures
- Release date: 12 April 1963
- Country: India
- Language: Malayalam

Moodupadam (transl. The Veil) is a 1963 Malayalam language film directed by Ramu Kariat and scripted by K. T. Muhammed based on S. K. Pottekkatt's novel of the same name. Sathyan and Ambika play the lead roles. It is a social film about the relationship between three major religious faiths in Kerala, Hindu, Muslim and Christian.

== Cast ==
- Sathyan
- Nellikkodu Bhaskaran
- Premji
- K. Balakrishna Menon
- Madhu
- Adoor Bhasi
- Velayudhan Nair
- Kuthiravattom Pappu
- Kunjava
- Kedamangalam Ali
- Muhammad
- Sinhalan
- R. S. Prabhu
- Velayudhan
- Vaidyanathan
- Ramesh
- Abdul Khader
- Master Hudh
- Master Soman
- Ambika Sukumaran
- Sheela
- Prema
- Shantha
- Rajam
- Kozhikode Shantha Devi
- K. P. Malathi
- Latha Raju credited as Baby Latha
- Baby Vilasini

== Crew ==
- Art direction: S. Konnanadu
- Sound: V. Sivaram, V. B. C. Menon (in Westrex Sound system)
- Makeup: K. V. Bhaskaran
- Costumes: V. M. Muthu
- Filming studios: Vijaya, Vauhini
- Outdoor Unit: Devi Sound Service
- Lab: Vijaya Lab
- Processing: P. M. Vijayaraghavalu
- Stills: Trichy K. Arunachalam
- Production manager: P. A. Backer
- Production executive: R. S. Prabhu

== Soundtrack ==
The music was composed by M. S. Baburaj and the lyrics were written by P. Bhaskaran and Yusufali Kechery.

No.	Song	Singers	Lyrics	Length (m:ss)
1	"Ayalathe Sundari"	K. J. Yesudas, P. Leela	P. Bhaskaran	
2	"Enthoru Thontharavu"	Mehboob	P. Bhaskaran	
3	"Ithaanu Bhaaratha Dharani"	Chorus, Shantha P. Nair	P. Bhaskaran	
4	"Maanathulloru"	Chorus, Latha Raju, Shantha P. Nair	P. Bhaskaran	
5	"Madanappoovanam Vittu"	Chorus, Shantha P. Nair	P. Bhaskaran	
6	"Mayilaanchithoppil"	M. S. Baburaj	Yusufali Kechery	
7	"Pandente Muttathu"	K. J. Yesudas	P. Bhaskaran	
8	"Seethapaharanam" (Bit)		P. Bhaskaran	
9	"Thaliritta Kinaakkal"	S. Janaki	P. Bhaskaran	
10	"Vattan Vilanjittum Varinellu"	P. Leela, Shantha P. Nair	P. Bhaskaran	
11	"Vennilaavudichappol"	Shantha P. Nair	P. Bhaskaran	
