= Malankattu =

- Directed by: Ramu Kariat
- Written by: Ramu Kariat
- Starring: Babu; Prathima; Shyamal Rao
- Cinematography: Ashok Kumar
- Edited by: M. S. Mani
- Music by: K. Raghavan
- Production company: Universal Films
- Distributed by: Universal Films
- Release date: 30 August 1980
- Country: India
- Language: Malayalam

Malankattu is a 1980 Indian Malayalam film, directed by Ramu Kariat. The film stars Babu, Prathima and Shyamal Rao in the lead roles. The film has musical score by K. Raghavan.

== Cast ==
- Babu
- Prathima
- Shyamal Rao

== Soundtrack ==
The music was composed by K. Raghavan and the lyrics were written by Poovachal Khader.

No.	Song	Singers	Lyrics	Length (m:ss)
1	"Ithaanu Sathyam"	K. J. Yesudas	Poovachal Khader	
2	"Karumbi Malayil"	K. J. Yesudas	Poovachal Khader	
3	"Kumkumapottu Podamma"	K. P. Brahmanandan, Chorus, Kalyani Menon	Poovachal Khader	
