= Purushartham =

1986 film

- Directed by: K. R. Mohanan
- Written by: C. V. Sreeraman; K. R. Mohanan (dialogues)
- Screenplay by: K. R. Mohanan
- Produced by: P. T. Kunju Muhammed
- Starring: Adoor Bhasi; Sujata Mehta; Jain George; Madambu Kunjukuttan
- Cinematography: Madhu Ambat
- Edited by: Venugopal
- Music by: M. B. Sreenivasan
- Production company: Mohan Muhammad Films
- Distributed by: Mohan Muhammad Films
- Release date: 31 December 1986
- Country: India
- Language: Malayalam

Purushartham (transl. The goals of human life) is a 1987 Indian Malayalam film, directed by K. R. Mohanan and produced by P. T. Kunjumuhammed. The film stars Adoor Bhasi, Sujata Mehta, Jain George and Madambu Kunjukuttan in the lead roles. This film won Kerala State Film Award for Best Film and National Film Award for Best Feature Film in Malayalam in 1987.

== Cast ==
- Adoor Bhasi
- Sujata Mehta
- Jebin George
- Madambu Kunjukuttan
