= Kozhikode Abdul Kader =

Indian singer

- കോഴിക്കോട് അബ്ദുൾ ഖാദർ
- Born: Lesli Andrews; July 19, 1915
- Died: February 13, 1977
- Notable work: Engane Nee Marakkum Kuyile song from the 1954 film Neelakuyil
- Parents: J.S. Andrews (father); Manini (mother)

Kozhikode Abdul Kader was an Indian playback singer who was active in Malayalam cinema during the 1950s. He lent his voice to songs for eight films and many dramas. One of his most popular songs is "Engane Nee Marakkum Kuyile" from the 1954 film Neelakuyil.

== Biography ==
He was born to J. S. Andrews and Manini on 19 July 1915 as Lesli Andrews. His mother died when he was very young. He converted to Islam and rechristened as Abdul Kader when he landed up in Burma. He was disowned by his father when he returned and was supported by a policeman named Kunjumuhammed who also fostered M. S. Baburaj who would later become a famed music composer.

He was first noticed by the music director V. Dakshinamoorthy who made him sing in the Malayalam film Navalokam in 1951.

Kader became a popular singer with the song "Engane Nee Marakkum Kuyile" from Neelakuyil (1954). Kader was fondly referred to as the Malabar Saigal.

He married Achumma and had six children with her: Najmal Babu (who was also a popular singer), Surayya, Moli, Zeenath, Naseema and Nasar. He met actress Santha Devi in 1948, married her and they had a son named Satyajith, who also became a singer. Abdul Kader died on 13 February 1977. In 2008 Nadeem Noushad, a documentary filmmaker, made a documentary film on Kozhikode Abdul Kadar titled Desh Raagathil Oru Jeevitham.

== List of songs ==
A partial list of songs recorded by Kozhikode Abdul Kader:

- Navalokam (1951) – "Thangakinakkal", "Parithaapamithe haa Jeevithame"
- Thiramala (1953) – "Hey Kaliyodame"
- Neelakuyil (1954) – "Engane Nee Marakkum Kuyile"
- Manikya Kottaram (1966) – "Nakshathrapunnukalaayiram"
- Minnaaminung – "Ithranaal Ithranaal", "Nee Enthariyunnu Neela Tharagamey", "Enthinu Kavilil Baashpadhaaraa"
- Nammalonnu (A play by Cherukad) – "Pachcha Panamthathe"
- Achan (1952) – "Dhaivame Karunaa Saagarame"
- "Paadanorthoru Madhura Geetham"
- "Nammude Janaadhipathya Keralam Vannale Pinne Njangal Nadakkum Aanungale Pole"
