= P.R.S. Pillai =

Indian film director and producer (1921-1997)

- Born: 28 September 1921; Villanchira, Kanjirappally, Kerala
- Died: 1997
- Occupations: film director, film producer
- Years active: early 1940s to 1991
- Spouse: Rajam (wife)
- Children: Shankar Mohan (son)

Pangappattu Ramanatha Pillai Sivashankara Pillai, popularly known as P.R.S. Pillai, was an Indian director and producer of documentary and feature films, active from the early 1940s to 1982.

Pillai won the national award for the best educational film for Virginia Tobacco, produced by the Films Division in 1962.

Pillai co-directed the Malayalam film Thiramala (1953) with Vimal Kumar and was also involved in producing it under the banner of Kalasagar Films.

The film is a significant work in Malayalam cinema for multiple reasons, such as the debut of key film personalities, introduction of double climax and as a musical hit.

Pillai was also a member of the jury responsible for evaluating feature films for India’s national film awards in 1991.

== Early life and career ==
Pillai was born on 28 September 1921 in Villanchira, Kanjirappally, Kerala.

After graduating from Madras University, he joined Newtone Studio, Madras (now Chennai), in the early 1940s. Pillai gained experience in film direction under the noted cinematographer and director Jiten Banerji. He also acquired skills in film editing and processing.

By 1951, he set up Kalasagar Films and produced the Malayalam film Thiramala (1953), serving as its co-director with Vimal Kumar.

Thiramala is a significant work in Malayalam cinema for several reasons. It marked the debut of Ramu Kariat as assistant director, Adoor Bhasi as actor, and M.S. Baburaj as assistant music director. It was also one of the earliest movies of Malayalam actor Sathyan.

Thiramala is considered the first Malayalam film to feature a double climax, presenting a happy ending for viewers in the Malabar region and a sad ending for those in the southern part of the state.

Thiramala is regarded as one of the first major musical hits in Malayalam cinema.

Later, Pillai directed and produced several short films for the Films Division; his notable works include Wheel of Prosperity (1955), In the Coal Mines (1958), Emergency Relief (1959), and the national award-winning Virginia Tobacco (1962).

Thereafter, he worked for the Armed Forces Film and Photo Division (AFFPD), under the Ministry of Defence (MOD). The AFFPD is responsible for the production, procurement, and distribution of training films, photographs, and other media in support of the country’s armed forces.

Additionally, Pillai made two educational feature films during the years 1981 to 1982.

Founder-chairperson of KSFDC/Chitranjali Film Studio

In 1975, Pillai became the first chairperson of the Kerala State Film Development Corporation (KSFDC). The organization was founded to promote Malayalam cinema and move its production activities from Chennai to Kerala.

Around 1977, Pillai, along with G. Vivekanandan, the then KSFDC managing director, identified land for a government-owned film studio under KSFDC about seven kilometers from Trivandrum city.

The studio founded on the site was named Chitranjali ("Chitra" meaning picture and "Anjali" meaning offering in various Indian languages) Film Studio. Pillai became the founder-chairperson of the studio.

== Personal ==
Pillai’s family includes his wife Dr. Rajam, son Shankar Mohan, daughter-in-law, and grandson. Dr. Rajam has done significant work in Kerala in the field of intellectual and developmental disabilities for more than three decades.

A charitable organization, the PRS Pillai Memorial Balavikas Trust, Peroorkkada, Trivandrum, provides care and support for people with intellectual disabilities. The trust was founded by Dr. Rajam, who serves as its director.

Shankar Mohan is a filmmaker, alumnus of the Film and Television Institute of India (FTII), and former director of the K.R. Narayanan National Institute of Visual Science and Arts, Kottayam, Kerala, serving for three years until 21 January 2023.

== Filmography ==
Director – documentaries

- Wheel of Prosperity (1955)
- In the Coal Mines (1958)
- Emergency Relief (1959)
- Virginia Tobacco (1962)

Director – feature films

- Thiramala (1953)
- Cancerum Laingika Rogangalum - tr: Cancer and Sexually Transmitted Diseases (1981)
- Oru Kunju Janikkunnu – Mathrukaa Kudumbam - tr: A Child is Born – A Model Family (1982)
