= Jeevitha Nouka =

- Advertisement of the Malayalam version
- Directed by: K. Vembu
- Written by: Muthukulam Raghavan Pillai
- Story by: K&K Productions
- Produced by: K. V. Koshi; Kunchako
- Starring: Thikkurissy Sukumaran Nair; B. S. Saroja; Adhimoolam; Pankajavalli; S.P.Pillai; Nanukuttan
- Cinematography: P. B. Mani
- Edited by: S. Williams
- Music by: V. Dakshinamoorthy
- Production company: K&K Productions
- Release date: 15 March 1951
- Running time: 170 minutes
- Country: India
- Language: Malayalam
- Budget: ₹ 20,000 (approx:₹704447.82)

Jeevitha Nouka (transl. The Lifeboat) is a 1951 Indian Malayalam-language film directed by K. Vembu and jointly produced by K. V. Koshi and Kunchako. It was the first "blockbuster film" in Malayalam cinema, with a theatrical run of 284 days. Made at a budget of ₹20,000, it was a commercial success at the box office, such that very few cinemas could surpass it later. It was simultaneously shot in Tamil and Telugu, and was dubbed and released in Hindi. This cinema portrayed the life of simple folk in a small village in Kerala. It stars Thikkurissy Sukumaran Nair and B. S. Saroja, with the latter making her debut and the former in his first major role. Its music is composed by V. Dakshinamoorthy and popular playback singer Mehboob debuted through this cinema. It is a remake of the Hindi cinema Jeevan Naiya with revised screenplay.

The Tamil version, titled Pichaikkaari (transl. The Lady Beggar), was released on 18 May 1951. Vidwan P. Adhimoolan wrote the dialogues and lyrics. The song "Vanaraniye enthan manaraniye", sung by Thiruchi Loganathan and P. Leela, was popular.

== Synopsis ==
The story revolves around the life of a family struggling with poverty and societal challenges. The protagonist, Raju, is a kind-hearted man who works hard to support his family. Despite his dedication, financial difficulties put immense pressure on him and his loved ones.

Raju's wife, Lakshmi, tries to maintain harmony in the household, but the arrival of wealth and materialistic ambitions disrupt their peaceful life. The plot delves into themes of greed, family values, and the conflicts that arise from differing priorities among family members.

The turning point comes when misunderstandings and disputes tear the family apart, highlighting the consequences of materialism and selfishness. The movie emphasizes the importance of unity, compassion, and selflessness as it moves toward its emotional climax and resolution.

== Cast ==
=== Malayalam ===
Main cast

- Thikkurissy Sukumaran Nair as Soman
- B. S. Saroja as Lakshmi
- Adhimoolam as Kaniyan
- Pankajavalli as Janu, Raju's wife
- S. P. Pillai as Shanku, Janu's brother
- Nanukuttan as Zamindar
- Sebastian Kunjukunju Bhagavathar as Raju, Soman's elder brother

Supporting cast

- Ponnappan Arckatty as SI of Police
- Muthukulam Raghavan Pillai, Ambalappuzha Ravunni, Baby Girija, Jagadamma, Janamma, Mathappan, Mulavana, Soman Pillai.

=== Tamil ===
Main cast

- Thikkurissy Sukumaran Nair as Soman
- Kunju Kunju Bhagavathar as Raju
- B. S. Saroja as Lakshmi
- Pankajavalli as Janu
- Adhimoolam as Kaniyar
- Muthukulam Raghavan Pillai as Lawyer
- S. P. Pillai as Shanku
- Mathappan as Kunju

Dance

- C. R. Rajakumari
- Indira Acharya
- B. S. Saroja
- Gopalakrishnan
- Balachandran

== Soundtrack ==
V. Dakshinamoorthy composed the music for both Malayalam and Tamil versions. All the tunes for all the songs for both languages are the same with slight changes in playback singers.

Malayalam songs (Jeevitha Nouka)

Lyrics were penned by Abhayadev and Vallathol Narayana Menon. Playback singers are Thiruchi Loganathan, Ghantasala, Sebastian Kunjukunju Bhagavathar, V. Dakshinamoorthy, Mehboob, P. Leela, Alappuzha Pushpam and Kaviyoor Revamma.

Song	Singer/s	Duration (m:ss)
"Paahi Thaaye"	Mehboob & Kaviyoor Revamma	
"Aanandamiyalum Baale"	P. Leela	
"Paathakalil Vaaneedumee"	Kaviyoor Revamma	
"Ghoraandhakaaramaaya"	Thiruchi Loganathan & P. Leela	
"Pasiyaaluyirvaadi"	Kaviyoor Revamma	
"Gathiyethumilla"	Kaviyoor Revamma	
"Vaarthinkal Thaalameduthavar" (Magdalana Mariyam)	Mehboob, V. Dakshinamoorthy & Kaviyoor Revamma	
"Premarajyamarnu"	V. Dakshinamoorthy & P. Leela	
"Aanathalayolam Venna"	Sebastian Kunjukunju Bhagavathar & Alappuzha Pushpam	
"Thornidumo Kanneer"	Mehboob & Kaviyoor Revamma	
"Paapamaanithu Baale"	Ghantasala	
"Karuthidaathey	Alappuzha Pushpam	
"Akaale Aarum Kaividam"	Mehboob	
"Vana Gaayike Vanil Varoo Naayike"	Mehboob & P. Leela	
"Thoraathasrudhaara"	Kaviyoor Revamma	

Tamil songs (Pichaikkaari)

Lyrics were penned by P. Aadhimoolan.

Song	Singer/s	Duration (m:ss)
"Baahi Thaaye Paarvathi"	P. Leela	
"Joraaga Uduthe Naane"	P. Leela	
"Neeyethaane Eesan Thunai"	P. Leela	
"Thedinaaro Yaavarum Dhanam"	Mehboob & Kaviyoor Revamma	
"Veedhigalil Vaazhdhiduvaar"	Kaviyoor Revamma	
"Gadhi Yaarum Illai"	Kaviyoor Revamma	
"Kaarmugil Keeri Velippadum"	Thiruchi Loganathan, P. Leela & Kaviyoor Revamma	
"Paavamaaam Idhu Paavaai"	Thiruchi Loganathan	
"Vaai Niraiya Vennai"	P. Leela	
"Yaaradi Kalli Neethaan"	Thiruchi Loganathan & P. Leela	
"Inidhaai Ennidatthe"	Ghantasala	
"Nanmaigal Seidhaal"	Thiruchi Loganathan	
"Sagaayam Yaarum Alladaa"	Thiruchi Loganathan	
"Vanaraniye Endhan Manaraniye"	Thiruchi Loganathan & P. Leela	

== Box office ==
This film was a critical and commercial success and ran over 284 days in theatres. The film was screened in Kozhikode for 175 days and ran for 107 days in Ernakulam. 100 days have been completed in Kollam, Alappuzha, Kottayam, Kannur and Thrissur districts.
