= Aniyara =

1978 film

- Directed by: Bharathan
- Written by: Uroob
- Screenplay by: Uroob
- Produced by: M. O. Joseph
- Starring: Kaviyoor Ponnamma; Sankaradi; Bahadoor; M. G. Soman
- Cinematography: Ashok Kumar
- Music by: G. Devarajan
- Production company: Manjilas
- Distributed by: Manjilas
- Release date: 12 May 1978
- Country: India
- Language: Malayalam

Aniyara is a 1978 Indian Malayalam film, directed by Bharathan and produced by M. O. Joseph. The film stars Kaviyoor Ponnamma, Sankaradi, Bahadoor and M. G. Soman in the lead roles. The film has musical score by G. Devarajan.

== Cast ==
- Kaviyoor Ponnamma
- Sankaradi
- Bahadoor
- M. G. Soman
- Mamatha
- Muralimohan
- Reena
- Urmila

== Soundtrack ==
The music was composed by G. Devarajan and the lyrics were written by P. Bhaskaran.

No.	Song	Singers	Lyrics	Length (m:ss)
1	"Anaghasankalpa Gaayike"	K. J. Yesudas	P. Bhaskaran	
2	"Kaanjirottu Kayalile"	Karthikeyan	P. Bhaskaran	
