= Abhinandanam =

- Promotional poster
- Directed by: I. V. Sasi
- Written by: Sherif
- Screenplay by: Sherif
- Produced by: A. Raghunath
- Starring: KP Ummer; Jayabharathi; Sreedevi; Vincent; Prakash; Prema; Bahadoor
- Cinematography: C. Ramachandra Menon
- Edited by: K Narayanan
- Music by: Kannur Rajan
- Production company: Sanjay Productions
- Distributed by: Sanjay Productions
- Release date: 2 December 1976
- Country: India
- Language: Malayalam

Abhinandanam is a 1976 Indian Malayalam-language film, directed by I. V. Sasi and produced by A. Raghunath. The film stars Jayabharathi, Vincent, K. P. Ummer, Bahadoor Prakash and Prema.

== Cast ==
- K. P. Ummer as Venu Menon
- Jayabharathi as Geetha
- M. G. Soman as Sreedharan
- Vincent as Suku
- Sridevi as Lalitha
- Rani Chandra as Radha
- Adoor Bhasi as Govindan
- P. K. Abraham as Prabhakaran
- Bahadoor as Vasu Pilla
- Kuthiravattam Pappu as Alikutty
- Alummoodan as Naanu ashan
- Ravikumar as Ravi
- Prema as Subadra
- Meena as Saraswathy
- Usharani as Vimala
- Janardanan as Police Inspector
- Sankaradi as Menon
- M. O. Devasya as Kunjuvareed
- Master Rajakrishnan as Damu
- Prakash
- Sankar Manankav
- Prathapachandran
- Treasa as Nabeesa

== Soundtrack ==
The music was composed by Kannur Rajan and the lyrics were written by Sreekumaran Thampi.

No.	Song	Singers	Lyrics	Length (m:ss)
1	"Chandranum Thaarakalum"	K. J. Yesudas	Sreekumaran Thampi	03:22
2	"Enthinenne Vilichu"	K. J. Yesudas	Sreekumaran Thampi	03:22
3	"Pathu Paisaakkoru"	S. Janaki	Sreekumaran Thampi	03:24
4	"Pushpathalpathil"	K. J. Yesudas, Lathika	Sreekumaran Thampi	03:22
5	"Pushpathalpathil" (Bit)	Lathika	Sreekumaran Thampi	00:31
