= Latha Raju =

- Born: June 25, 1951 (age 75); Trichur, Kerala, India
- Genres: Playback singing, Acting, Dubbing
- Occupation: Singer
- Instrument: Vocals
- Years active: 1962–1999
- Label: Audiotracs

Latha Raju (born 25 June 1951) is an Indian film singer and actress in Malayalam cinema during the 1970s. Some of her popular Malayalam songs are "Pinchu Hridayam Devalayam" and "Manjakkilee Swarnakkilee Mayilppeelikkaattile Varnakkilee" from the film Sethubandhanam, "Ividuthe Chechikkinnale" (Azhakulla Saleena) and "Aaluvaappuzhakkakkareyoru Ponnambalam" (Aadyathe Kadha). She has also rendered songs in Tamil, Kannada and Tulu. She has dubbed for famous actresses like Suhasini, Shobhana, late Shobha and many other leading actresses in some of the landmark films in Malayalam. She has won Kerala Film Critics Award in 2003 for lifetime achievement. The Kerala Sangeetha Nataka Akademi awarded her the Kerala Sangeetha Nataka Akademi Award in 2009 for contributions to Malayalam light music. In 2019 Kerala Government honoured her for her outstanding contributions to Malayalam cinema and music.

She worked in All India Radio / Dooradarshan in various capacities for 34 years. Was the Station Director of Chennai and Trivandrum Stations for many years and retired as Director of Marketing.

Her very first released song which she sang when she was a child 'Onnamtharam Balloon Tharaam' (written by P. Bhaskaran and composed by M. B. Sreenivasan) became a sensational hit on the Social Media Reels in 2025, after 63 years of its release.

== Personal life ==
Latha Raju born on 25.06.1951 is the only child of singer Santha P. Nair and K. Padmanabhan Nair, who was a writer, film director, radio dramatist and All India Radio Station Director. Her first song was in the 1962 Malayalam film Snehadeepam. She post graduated in Master of Arts. She retired as director of marketing in Akashvani, Doordarshan, Chennai in 2011 and continued in the same post as a consultant till 2016. Her husband, J. M. Raju, himself a playback singer, produces music albums. The couple have two children, Aalap Raju and Anupama. Her son Aalap Raju is also a musician and playback singer.

== Filmography ==
=== As an actress ===
- Moodupadam (1963)
- Chemmeen (1965)
- Pakalkkinavu (1966)
- Ezhu Raathrikal (1968)

=== As a Dubbing Artist ===
(List incomplete)

Shoba : Various films, Shobhana : Kanamarayathu, Rariram, Aparan etc., Urvashi : Nandi Veendum Varika etc.

Parvathy : Thoovana Thumbikal etc., Shanthi Krishna : Parinayam etc., Suhasini Maniratnam : Koodevide etc.

Shari (actress): Namukku Paarkan Munthiri Thoppukal, Parannu Parannu Parannu etc., Sumithra (actress) : Nirmalyam etc.

Rita Bhaduri : Kanyakumari

=== As a playback singer ===
- Onnaamtharam Balloon Tharaam -Snehadeepam (1962)
- Thaatheyyam Kaattile - Kannum Karalum (1962)
- Maanathulloru - Moodupadam (1963)
- Poo Poocha Poochetti - Devaalayam (1964)
- Kannaaram Pothi - Murappennu (1965)
- Kannukalennal - Devatha (1965)
- Janmabhoomi Bharatam - Devatha (1965)
- Ponnaaram Chollaathe - Subaida (1965)
- Ichirippoovalan - Inapraavukal (1965)
- Paavakkutti - Kadathukaaran (1965)
- Ambaadi Thannil - Kadathukaaran (1965)
- Premaswapnathin - Chekuthaante Kotta (1967)
- Paampine Pedichu - NGO (1967)
- Kakkakkarumbikale - Ezhu Raathrikal (1968)
- Makkathu Poyvarum - Ezhu Raathrikal (1968)
- Ithuvare Pennoru - Kaliyalla Kalyaanam (1968)
- Thaarunya Swapnangal - Kaliyalla Kalyaanam (1968)
- Karayunna Nerathum - Velliyaazhcha (1969)
- Kezhakku Kezhakkorana- Thriveni (1970)
- Nammude Mathaavu - Abhayam (1970)
- Thirumayilppeeli - Swapnangal (1970)
- Kanninu Kannaaya - Priya (1970)
- Villukettiya - Line Bus (1971)
- Thallu Thallu - Aabhijaathyam (1971)
- Aattin Manappurathu - Aabhijaathyam (1971)
- Paappi Appacha - Mayilaadumkunnu (1972)
- Umma Tharumo - Preethi (1972)
- Aaluvaappuzhakkakare - Aadyathe Kadha (1972)
- Va Mammy Va Mummy - Panitheeraatha Veedu (1973)
- Kaattumozhukkum - Panitheeraatha Veedu (1973)
- Ividathe Chechikku - Azhakulla Saleena (1973)
- Kanna Nee Vaazhga - Manidharil Manikkam (1973) - Tamil
- Pinchuhridayam - Sethubandhanam (1974)
- Manjakkilee - Sethubandhanam (1974)
- Padinjaroru Paalazhi - Chakravaakam (1974)
- Paanante Veenakku - Thumbolaarcha (1974)
- Atham Rohini - Thumbolaarcha (1974)
- Polalli - Prayaanam (1975)
- Maappilappaattile - Alibabayum 41 Kallanmaarum (1975)
- Vallaathe Vishakkunnu - Ayodhya (1975)
- Kandam Vechoru - Maanishaada (1975)
- Kaathu Kaathu - Manassoru Mayil (1977)
- Maanathoraaraattam - Manassoru Mayil (1977)
- Hindolaraagathin - Thuruppugulaan (1977)
- Ilaahi Nin Rehmath - Thuruppugulaan (1977)
- Nanma Nerum Amma - Aparaadhi (1977)
- Ammaykku Vendathu - Niraparayum Nilavilakkum (1977)
- Chentheekkanal - Agninakshathram (1977)
- Velutha vaavinte - Veedu Oru Swargam (1977)
- Kalyaanaraathriyil - Samudram (1977)
- Nallavar Sollai - Anbin Alaigal (1977) - Tamil
- Pankajaakshi - Sooryadaham (1980)
- Thulaabharamallo - Kochu Kochu Thettukal (1980)
- Achan sundara sooryan - Swarangal Swapnangal (1981)
- Pottichirikkunna - Kadhayariyaathe (1981)
- Nirangal Nirangal - Kadhayariyaathe (1981)
- Aayilyam - Naagamadathu Thampuraatti (1982)
- Punnarappenninte - Jambulingam (1982)
- Maama maama karayalle - Thuranna Jail (1982)
- Oorukaani malavazhiye - Aaroodham (1983)
- Rithumathiyaay - Mazhanilaavu (1983)
- Neelamalayude - Aa Penkutty Nee Aayirunnenkil (1985)
- Ennaaliniyoru Kadha - Kochuthemmaadi (1986)
- Aattavum Paattum - Kilippaattu (1987)
- Porunnirikkum Choodil - Sarvakalashaala (1987)
- Vaanil Vibhaatham - Chevalier Michael (1992)
