= Sundarikalum Sundaranmarum =

Book by Uroob

The Beautiful and the Handsome
- Author: Uroob
- Original title: Sundarikalum Sundaranmarum
- Translator: Susila Mishra
- Language: Malayalam
- Genre: Historical fiction
- Publisher: DC Books
- Publication date: 1958
- Publication place: India
- Media type: Paperback
- Pages: 446
- ISBN: 978-8-126-40727-9

Sundarikalum Sundaranmarum (The Beautiful and the Handsome) is a 1958 Malayalam novel written by Uroob (P. C. Kuttikrishnan). Sundarikalum Sundaranmarum and Ummachu are considered Uroob's best works and are ranked among the finest novels in Malayalam.

== Plot summary ==
The novel has about thirty characters belonging to three generations of eight families from Malabar soon after the end of the First World War, when the infamous Moplah rebellion broke out in Kerala.

== Publication ==
Sundarikalum Sundaranmarum was serialised in Mathrubhumi Weekly in 1954 and was published as a book in 1958. It was translated into English by Susila Mishra under the title The Beautiful and the Handsome. The original title Sundarikalum Sundaranmarum can be literally transliterated as Men and Women of Charm.

== Genre ==
As revealed in the preface, the author himself is non-committal about the genre to which the book falls into and leaves the question to critics and readers, adding that he had a story to tell and he has told it. Literary critic M. Achuthan in his introduction to the book, calls it first a chronicle, then a cultural history and finally a kind of historical novel.

== Awards ==
Sundarikalum Sundaranmarum won the Kendra Sahitya Akademi Award, India's most prestigious literary award, in 1960. It also got the Asan Centenary Award in 1973, a special award given by the Kerala Sahitya Akademi for the most outstanding work since Independence.
