= 2nd National Film Awards =

Indian ceremony celebrating cinema of 1954

- Awarded for: Best of Indian cinema in 1954
- Awarded by: Ministry of Information and Broadcasting
- Presented by: Rajendra Prasad (President of India)
- Presented on: 21 December 1955
- Site: Vigyan Bhavan, New Delhi
- Official website: dff.nic.in

Highlights
- Best Feature Film: Mirza Ghalib
- Most awards: • Mirza Ghalib • Neelakuyil (2)

The 2nd National Film Awards, then known as State Awards for Films, presented by Ministry of Information and Broadcasting, India to felicitate the best of Indian Cinema released in the year 1954. Ceremony took place at Vigyan Bhavan, New Delhi on 21 December 1955 and awards were given by then President of India, Rajendra Prasad.

With the increasing number of films made in India, couple of new awards were introduced. Starting with 2nd National Film Awards, awards were divided into feature film and non-feature film awards. Feature films were, again, awarded at All India and Regional level. Awards were given to seven regional language films which are in Bengali, Hindi, Kannada, Malayalam, Marathi, Tamil and Telugu.

At All India level, Children's films were awarded with its own category where awards were categorised as Prime Minister's gold medal and Certificate of Merit. For all other categories, awards were given as President's gold medal and Certificate of Merit. Regional films were awarded with President's silver medal for Best Feature Film and Certificate of Merit. Non-feature film awards were awarded for documentaries made in the country.

== Juries ==
Three different committees were formed based on the film making sectors in India, mainly based in Bombay, Calcutta and Madras. Another committee for all India level was also formed which included some of the members from regional committee. For 2nd National Film Awards, central committee was headed by R. R. Diwakar.

- Jury Members: Central
  - R. R. Diwakar (Chairperson) • N. K. Siddhanta • T. M. Narayanaswami Pillai • M. D. Bhat • Kamaladevi Chattopadhyay • Satyavati Mallik • Syed Nurullah • S. S. Vasan • V. Shantaram • R. Subbarao • Ardhendu Mukerjee
- Jury Regional: Bombay
  - M. D. Bhat (Chairperson) • Kusumavati Deshpande • M. R. Palande • Moti Chandra • Bhagwati Charan Verma • V. K. Gokak • Vijay Bhatt • Kishore Sahu • Jagdish Sethi
- Jury Regional: Calcutta
  - N. K. Siddhanta (Chairperson) • Sabita Devi • Kalidas Nag • O. C. Ganguly • Sudhir Mukerjee • K. L. Chattarjee
- Jury Regional: Madras
  - T. M. Narayanaswami Pillai (Chairperson) • Manjubhashini • Mu. Varadarajan • R. Subbarao • B. Ramakrishna Raju • Aiyapan • A. Ramaiah • K. Ramnath

== Awards ==
Awards were divided into feature films and non-feature films.

President's gold medal for the All India Best Feature Film is now better known as National Film Award for Best Feature Film, whereas President's gold medal for the Best Documentary Film is analogous to today's National Film Award for Best Non-Feature Film. For children's films, Prime Minister's gold medal is now given as National Film Award for Best Children's Film. At the regional level, President's silver medal for Best Feature Film is now given as National Film Award for Best Feature Film in a particular language. Certificate of Merit in all the categories is discontinued over the years.

=== Feature films ===
Feature films were awarded at All India as well as regional level. For the 2nd National Film Awards, in this category, Mirza Ghalib, a biographical Hindi / Urdu film, based on the life of well-known poet Mirza Ghalib, along with a Malayalam film, Neelakuyil won the maximum number of awards (two), with former also winning the President's gold medal for the All India Best Feature Film. Following were the awards given:

==== All India Award ====
For 2nd National Film Awards, none of the films were awarded from Children's films category as no film was found to be suitable.

Award	Film	Language	Awardee(s)	
Award	Film	Language	Producer	Director
President's gold medal for the All India Best Feature Film	Mirza Ghalib	Hindi	Minerva Moviestone	Sohrab Modi
All India Certificate of Merit	Neelakuyil	Malayalam	Chandrathara Productions	P. Bhaskaran
All India Certificate of Merit	Neelakuyil	Malayalam	Chandrathara Productions	Ramu Kariat
All India Certificate of Merit	Biraj Bahu	Hindi	Hiten Chaudhary Productions	Bimal Roy

==== Regional Award ====
The awards were given to the best films made in the regional languages of India. For 2nd National Film Awards, awards were given in seven regional language films which are in Bengali, Hindi, Kannada, Malayalam, Marathi, Tamil and Telugu.

Award	of Film	Awardee(s)	
Award	of Film	Producer	Director
Feature Films in Bengali
President's silver medal for Best Feature Film	Chheley Kaar	Charan Chitra	Chitta Bose
Certificate of Merit	Jadu Bhatta	Sunrise Film Distributors	Niren Lahiri
Certificate of Merit	Annapurnar Mandir	Chitra Mandir	Naresh Mitra
Feature Films in Hindi
President's silver medal for Best Feature Film	Mirza Ghalib	Minerva Moviestone	Sohrab Modi
Certificate of Merit	Jagriti	Filmistan Ltd.	Satyen Bose
Feature Films in Kannada
Certificate of Merit	Bedara Kannappa	Gubbi Karnataka Productions	H. L. N. Simha
Feature Films in Malayalam
President's silver medal for Best Feature Film	Neelakuyil	Chandrathara Productions	P. Bhaskaran
President's silver medal for Best Feature Film	Neelakuyil	Chandrathara Productions	Ramu Kariat
Certificate of Merit	Snehaseema	Associate Pictures	Dakshina Murthy
Feature Films in Marathi
President's silver medal for Best Feature Film	Mahatma Phule	Atre Pictures	Pralhad Keshav Atre
Feature Films in Tamil
President's silver medal for Best Feature Film	Malaikkallan	Pakshiraja Studios	S. M. Sriramulu Naidu
Certificate of Merit	Andha Naal	AVM Productions	S. Balachander
Certificate of Merit	Edhir Paradhathu	Saravanabhava and Unity Pictures	C. H. Narayana Moorthy
Feature Films in Telugu
President's silver medal for Best Feature Film	Peddamanushulu	Vauhini Productions	K. V. Reddy
Certificate of Merit	Thodu Dongalu	National Art Theatres	D. Yoganand
Certificate of Merit	Vipra Narayana	Bharani Pictures	P. S. Ramakrishna Rao

=== Non-Feature films ===
Non-feature film awards were given for the documentaries made in the country. Following were the awards given:

==== Documentaries ====
Award	Film	Language	Awardee(s)	
Award	Film	Language	Producer	Director
President's gold medal for the Best Documentary Film	Spirit of the Loom	English	Films Division	V. R. Sarma
Certificate of Merit	Darjeeling	English	Films Division	K. L. Khandpur
Certificate of Merit	Golden River	English	Films Division	P. V. Pathy

=== Awards not given ===
Following awards were not given as no film was found to be suitable for the award:

- Prime Minister's gold medal for the Best Children's Film
- President's silver medal for Best Feature Film in Kannada
