= Doctor (1963 film) =

- Directed by: M. S. Mani
- Written by: Vaikkom Chandrasekharan Nair
- Screenplay by: Vaikkom Chandrasekharan Nair
- Produced by: H. H. Ebrahim
- Starring: Sathyan; Sheela; Thikkurissy Sukumaran Nair; T. S. Muthaiah
- Cinematography: U. Rajagopal
- Edited by: M. S. Mani
- Music by: G. Devarajan
- Production company: Kalalaya
- Distributed by: Kalalaya
- Release date: 20 March 1963
- Country: India
- Language: Malayalam

Doctor is a 1963 Indian Malayalam-language film, directed by M. S. Mani and produced by H. H. Ebrahim. The film stars Sathyan, Sheela, Thikkurissy Sukumaran Nair and T. S. Muthaiah. The film had musical score by G. Devarajan. The film received a certificate of merit at the National Film Awards.

== Cast ==
- Sathyan as Dr. Rajendran
- Sheela as Jayasree
- Thikkurissy Sukumaran Nair as Dr. Madhava Menon
- T. S. Muthaiah as Alex
- Adoor Pankajam
- J. A. R. Anand
- Kottayam Chellappan
- Nellikode Bhaskaran
- O. Madhavan as Venu
- S. P. Pillai
- K. V. Shanthi as Seetha
- Susheel
- Shyam
- Usha
- Shantha

== Soundtrack ==
The music was composed by G. Devarajan and the lyrics were written by P. Bhaskaran. This was the first collaboration of G. Devarajan with P. Bhaskaran. Background music was composed by M. B. Sreenivasan

| No. | Song | Singers | Length (m:ss) |
|---|---|---|---|
| 1 | "Ennaane Ninnaane" | K. J. Yesudas, P. Leela, Chorus | |
| 2 | "Kalpanayaakum" | K. J. Yesudas, P. Susheela | |
| 3 | "Keledi Ninne Njaan" | Kottayam Santha, Mehboob | |
| 4 | "Kinaavinte Kuzhimaadathil" | P. Susheela | |
| 5 | "Ponnin Chilanka" (Pathos I) | P. Leela | |
| 6 | "Ponnin Chilanka" (Pathos II) | P. Leela | |
| 7 | "Vandee Pukavandee" | Mehboob | |
| 8 | "Varanondu Varanondu" | K. J. Yesudas, P. Susheela | |
| 9 | "Viralonnu Muttiyaal" | P. Leela | |
