= Manushyabandhangal =

- Directed by: Crossbelt Mani
- Written by: M. K. Mani
- Screenplay by: M. K. Mani
- Starring: Prem Nazir; Madhu; Sheela; Jayabharathi
- Cinematography: P. Ramaswami
- Edited by: G. Venkittaraman
- Music by: V. Dakshinamoorthy
- Production company: Karthika Films
- Distributed by: Karthika Films
- Release date: 24 March 1972
- Country: India
- Language: Malayalam

Manushyabandhangal is a 1972 Indian Malayalam-language film directed by Crossbelt Mani. The film stars Prem Nazir, Madhu, Sheela and Jayabharathi in the lead roles. The film has musical score by V. Dakshinamoorthy.

== Cast ==
- Prem Nazir as Sekharan
- Madhu as Madhavan
- Sheela as Sudha
- Jayabharathi as Nirmala
- Adoor Bhasi as Kumaran
- N. N. Pillai
- P. J. Antony as Sanku Pilla
- C. A. Balan as Velu
- Girish Kumar as Rajan
- J. A. R. Anand as Police
- Lakshmi Amma as Naniyamma
- Nambiar
- Paravoor Bharathan as Varghese
- Ramankutty as George
- S. P. Pillai as Nanu Nair
- Sujatha as Mini

== Soundtrack ==
The music was composed by V. Dakshinamoorthy and the lyrics were written by P. Bhaskaran.

No.	Song	Singers	Lyrics	Length (m:ss)
1	"Ezhu Sundara Kanyakamaar"	K. J. Yesudas	P. Bhaskaran	
2	"Kanakaswapnangal"	K. J. Yesudas, P. Susheela, P. Jayachandran, L. R. Eeswari	P. Bhaskaran	
3	"Maasam Poovani Maasam"	K. J. Yesudas	P. Bhaskaran	
4	"Manushya Bandhangal"	K. J. Yesudas	P. Bhaskaran	
5	"Mizhiyillengilum"	P. Susheela	P. Bhaskaran	
