= Uroob =

Indian writer (1915–1979)

P. C. Kuttikrishnan
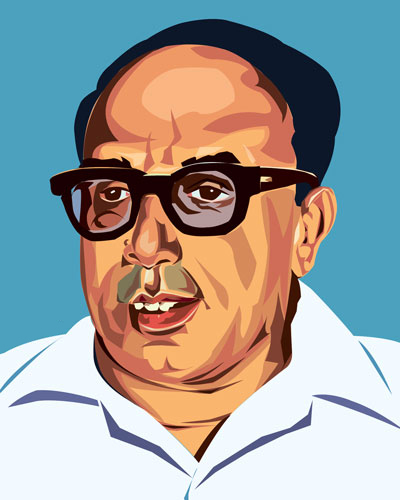
- Born: Parutholli Chalappurathu Kuttikrishna Menon; 8 June 1915; Ponnani, Malappuram, Kerala, India
- Died: 10 July 1979 (aged 64); Medical college, Kottayam, Kerala, India
- Occupations: Novelist, short story writer, journalist
- Spouse: Devaki Amma
- Relatives: Parutholli Chalappurathu Karunakara Menon (father); Parukutty Amma(Parvathy)(mother)
- Writing career
- Pen name: Uroob
- Language: Malayalam
- Subject: Social aspects
- Notable works: Sundarikalum Sundaranmarum, Ummachu
- Notable awards: Sahitya Akademi Award; Kerala Sahitya Akademi Award for Novel
- Movement: Realism

Parutholli Chalappurathu Kuttikrishnan Karunakara Menon, popularly known by his pen name Uroob (1915 – 1979) was an Indian writer of Malayalam literature. Along with Basheer, Thakazhi, Kesavadev, and Pottekkatt, Uroob was counted among the progressive writers in Malayalam during the twentieth century. He was known for his novels such as Sundarikalum Sundaranmarum and Ummachu, short stories like Rachiyamma and the screenplays of a number of Malayalam films including Neelakuyil, the first Malayalam feature film to receive the National Film Award. He was a recipient of several honours including Kendra Sahithya Academy Award and the inaugural Kerala Sahitya Akademi Award for Novel.

== Biography ==
Parutholli Chalappurathu Kuttikrishnan Karunakara Menon was born on June 8, 1915, to Parutholli Chalappurathu Karunakara Menon and Parukutty Amma(Parvathy) at Pallapram, a small village near Ponnani, in Malappuram district of the south Indian state of Kerala. His early education was at A. V. High School, Ponnani and after matriculation, he travelled for six years, working at various places in India. During this period, he worked at a tea estate in the Nilgiri hills, a textile factory and K. R. Brothers Printers in Kozhikode, Mangalodhayam monthly, and joined the Kozhikode station of the All India Radio (AIR) in 1954. After retiring from service as a producer of AIR in 1975, he served as the editor of Kunkumam weekly for a while before joining Malayala Manorama in 1976 where he worked as the chief editor of Malayala Manorama weekly and Bhashaposhini. He also served as the president of the Kerala Sahitya Akademi.

Kuttikrishnan married Devaki Amma, the sister-in-law of Edasseri Govindan Nair, in 1948. He died on July 10, 1979, at the age of 64, while he was being treated at the Government Medical College, Kottayam.

== Literary and film career ==
Kuttikrishnan joined a literary group in Ponnani in the 1930s which had Edasseri Govindan Nair, Kuttikrishna Marar, Akkitham, Kadavanad Kuttikrishnan, and Moothedath Narayanan Vaidyar as its members and it was during this time he wrote his first short story, Velakkariyude Checkkan. He assumed the pen name, Uroob which means eternal youth in Persian language and dusk in Arabic, for an article he wrote on K. Raghavan, a noted music director of Malayalam cinema, to conceal his identity as the music director was his colleague at AIR and he continued with the pseudonym thereafter. His first short story anthology, Neerchalukal was published in 1945 and three years later, Amina, his first novel was published. His body of work included 8 novels, 27 short story anthologies, three plays, 3 poetry anthologies and three essay compilations. Ummachu published in 1954, Mindappennu, published in 1956 and Sundarikalum Sundaranmarum (The Beautiful and the Handsome) published in 1958 among novels and Gopalan Nayarude Thadi, Rachiyamma and Thurannitta Jalakam among short stories are some of his most notable works. M. Krishnan Nair, a known Malayalam literary critic, counted Rachiyamma among the best stories of world literature. Ummachu has been translated into English under the title, The Beloved. Several of his works have strong female characters and he was known to be an advocate of gender equality. Three of his anthologies, Ankaveeran, Mallanum Maranavum and Appuvinte Lokam are children's literature and he is considered by many as one of the greats of that genre in Malayalam literature.

In 1954, When Ramu Kariat decided to make a feature film based on Uroob's story, Neelakuyil, under the same name, he co-wrote the screenplay with P. Bhaskaran. The film went on become a landmark in Malayalam cinema and was the first feature film to receive national recognition by winning the National Film Award for Best Feature Film in Malayalam. His association with P. Bhaskaran continued to yield four more films, Rarichan Enna Pauran (1956), Nairu Pidicha Pulivalu (1958), Kurukshetram (1970) and Ummachu (1971). In between, he wrote the screenplay for Mindapennu, a film by K. S. Sethumadhavan in 1970. He wrote the screenplays for two more films, Thrisandhya in 1972 and Aniyara in 1978, the latter a film by Bharathan.

== Awards and honours ==
Uroob received three awards from the Government of Tamil Nadu (then Government of Madras), for Kathir Katta in 1948, Thurannitta Jalakam in 1949 and Kumbedukkunna Mannu in 1951. Kerala Sahitya Akademi instituted an annual award for Novel in 1958, Ummachu was selected for inaugural award. He received Sahitya Akademi Award in 1960 for his work, Sundarikalum Sundaranmarum, in 1960, the same year as he received the M. P. Paul Award for Gopalan Nayarude Thady. In 1971, he received the Kerala State Film Award for Best Story for the film adaptation of Ummachu. Two years later, Sundarikalum Sundaranmarum won him another honour, the Ashan Centenary Award. The Government of Kerala set up a museum, Uroob Memorial Literary Museum, in his honour at the premises of Kiliyanad School in Kozhikode.

== Major works ==
=== Novels ===
- Uroob (1948). Aamina. Sahitya Pravarthaka Sahakarana Sangham. ISBN 978-8130016979.
- Uroob (1952). Kunjammayum Koottukarum. Sahitya Pravarthaka Sahakarana Sangham. ISBN 978-8130001579.
- Uroob (1954). Ummachu. Sahitya Pravarthaka Sahakarana Sangham. ISBN 978-81-7130-230-7.
- Uroob (1956). Mindappennu. Sahitya Pravarthaka Sahakarana Sangham. ISBN 978-8171800865.
- Uroob (1958). Sundarikalum Sundaranmarum. Sahitya Pravarthaka Sahakarana Sangham. ISBN 978-81-264-0727-9.
- Uroob (1967). Chuzhiku Pimbe Chuzhi. Kerala Sahitya Akademi. ASIN B007E4VI7E.
- Uroob (1968). Aniyara. Kerala Sahitya Akademi. ISBN 978-8130008646.
- Uroob (1972). Ammini. Kerala Sahitya Akademi. ISBN 978-8171804672.

=== Short stories ===
- Uroob (1945). Neerchalukal. Kozhikode: Poorna. Archived from the original on 23 April 2019.
- Uroob (1946). Navonmesham. Kozhikode: Poorna.
- Uroob (1949). Thurannitta Jalakam (2nd. ed.). Calicut: Poorna. ISBN 9798171805722. Archived from the original on 23 April 2019.
- Uroob (1950). Neelamala. Kozhikode: Poorna Publications. ISBN 9788171806355. Archived from the original on 23 April 2019.
- Uroob (1951). Koompedukkunna Mannu. Kottayam: S.P.C.S. Archived from the original on 23 April 2019.
- Uroob (1952). Ullavarum Illathavarum. Thrissur: Current Books.
- Uroob (1952). Neelavelicham. Calicut: Poorna. Archived from the original on 23 April 2019.
- Uroob (1954). Moulaviyum Changathimarum. Sahitya Pravarthaka Sahakarana Sangham. ISBN 978-8171809264.
- Uroob (1955). Thamarathoppi. Sahitya Pravarthaka Sahakarana Sangham. ISBN 978-8130001555.
- Uroob (1958). Velutta Kutti. Sahitya Pravarthaka Sahakarana Sangham. ISBN 978-8171806300.
- Uroob (1962). Thenmullukal. Mangalodayam: Mangalodayam.
- Uroob (1963). Gopalan Nayarude Thadi. Sahitya Pravarthaka Sahakarana Sangham. ISBN 978-8171806270.
- Uroob (1966). Mukhammoodikal (2nd ed.). Kozhikode: Poorna. ISBN 9788171801169.
- Uroob (1968). 3334nte charithram. Poorna Publications.
- Uroob (1969). Rachiyamma. Sahitya Pravarthaka Sahakarana Sangham. ISBN 978-8171804610.
- Uroob (1972). Vasanthayude Amma (in Malayalam). Amina Book Stall.
- Uroob (1974). Nilavinte Rahasyam.
- Uroob (1976). Manjin Marayile Sooryan. National Book Stall, Kottayam: National Book Stall. Archived from the original on 23 April 2019.
- Uroob (1980). Reserve Cheyyatha Berth. Poorna Publications. ISBN 978-8130001548.
- Uroob (2004). Neelakkuyil. Current Books. ASIN B007E4WJGI.
- Uroob (2006). Uroobinte Krithikal. DC Books. ISBN 978-81-264-1210-5.
- Uroob (2007). Uroobinte Kuttikkathakal (4th ed.). DC Books. ISBN 978-81-264-0131-4.
- Uroob (2008). Malayalathinte Suvarnakathakal. Green Books. ISBN 978-8184232158.
- Uroob (2011). Uroobinte Theranjedutha Kathakal. Vol. 1. Poorna Publications. ISBN 978-8130009100.
- Uroob (2011). Uroobinte Theranjedutha Kathakal. Vol. 2. Poorna Publications. ISBN 978-8130009100.
- Uroob (2012). Uroob Sthreekathakal. H and C Publishing. ISBN 978-9382776307.
- Uroob (2012). Aval. H and C Publishing. ISBN 978-9382776314.
- Uroob (2013). Navarasakadhakal. Kannur: Kairali Books. ISBN 9789381649824.
- Kathir-Katta
- Lathiyum Pookalum

=== Plays (theatre) ===
- Uroob (1954). Mannum Pennum. Sahitya Pravarthaka Sahakarana Sangham. ISBN 978-8171800407.
- Uroob (1961). Miss Chinnuvum Lady Januvum. Current Books: Current Books.
- Uroob (1970). Theekondu Kalikkaruthu. Kottayam: N.B.S. Archived from the original on 23 April 2019.

=== Essay compilations ===
- Uroob (1969). Kavi Sammelanam. Kerala Sahitya Akademi.
- Uroob (1980). Uroobinde Shaniyazhchakal. D.C. Books, Kottayam: D.C. Books, Kottayam.
- Uroobinde Lekhanangal

=== Children's stories ===
- Uroob (1979). Appuvinte Lokam. Kottayam: National Book Stall.
- Uroob (1966). Mallanum Maranavum. Poorna Publications. ISBN 9788171805181.
- Uroob (1967). Ankaveeran. Sahitya Akademi. ISBN 978-8171809325.

=== Translations in other languages ===
- "One Death turned back", translated from the Malayalam by Narayana Menon, publ. in The Illustrated Weekly of India, Bombay, September 29, 1963, pp. 44-46
- Uroob (1974). The Beloved. Translated by Raghava R. Menon. Hind Pocket Books. ISBN 9780882536965. "(English translation of Ummachu)"
- Uroob (1982). The Beautiful and the Handsome. Translated by Susheela Mishra. Thrissur: Kerala Sahitya Academy. ASIN B0006EEXJO.

=== Poems ===
- Uroob (1947). Pirannal (in Malayalam) (0 ed.).
- Nizhalattam
- Maamoolinte Mattoli

=== Screenplays ===
- Neelakuyil
- Rarichan Enna Pouran
- Nairu Pidicha Pulivalu
- Kurukshetram
- Ummachu
- Thrisandhya
- Aniyara

=== Short film ===
- Rachiyamma

== Works on Uroob ==
- Abdul Rahim Mahmood Zalat (1972). Al Urooba li shir al muhajir (in Arabic). Cairo: Darul Fikkrul Arabi.
- Sivaraman, Koomulli (1975). Uroobinte Novelukal.
- George Irumpayam (1983). Uroob: Vyakthiyum Saahithyakaaranum (Uroob: The Man and the Writer). Kottayam: DC books. Archived from the original on 23 April 2019.
- Tharakan, K. M. (1986). Anaswaranaya Uroob. Sahitya Pravarthaka Co.op. Society Ltd., Kottayam: Sahitya Pravarthaka Co.op. Society Ltd., Kottayam.
- Padmini, P. (2003). Uroobinte lokam: Sthree vaada sameepanam (The World of Uroob). University of Calicut.
- Sreedharan, P. M. (2005). Tamil poetics: Theory and its application- A study based on the major works of Uroob and M T Vasudevan Nair. University of Calicut.
- Jyothilakshmi, P. S. (2008). Uroobinte sthreethwa darsanam. Thrissur: Kerala Sahitya Akademi. ISBN 9788176901574.
- Panmana Ramachandran Nair, ed. (2014). Uroob padanangal. Kottayam: Current Books. ISBN 9788124019863.
- Nithya P Viswam (2016). Uroobinte Chiri. Vallathol vidyapeedam Prabandhaavali. Edappal: Vallathol vidyapeedam. ISBN 9789383570577.
