= Swaroopam =

- Directed by: K. R. Mohanan
- Written by: K. R. Mohanan
- Starring: Sreenivasan; Sandhya Rajendran; V. K. Sriraman
- Release date: 1992
- Country: India
- Language: Malayalam

Swaroopam is a 1992 Malayalam film written and directed by K. R. Mohanan, starring Sreenivasan, Sandhya Rajendran and V. K. Sriraman. It won the National Film Award for Best Feature Film in Malayalam.

== Plot ==
Shekharan is a farmer. He lives in the countryside with his wife and two children. Shekharan is a hard worker and has no time for anything but his job. He progressively builds up his assets and is saving money for the construction of his house.

An old man, a relative of Shekharan, comes to his house. The old man tells him that Shekharan is part of a large family which has been privileged enough to be resourceful due to the boon of a great-grandfather of the family. He invites Shekharan to visit the family. Shekharan goes with the old man and visits his distant cousins who are all well placed and affluent. Shekharan learns that the boons of the family are from the spiritual accomplishments of the great-great-grandfather.

Shekharan returns home and loses interest in his job. He gets on to spirituality. He builds a small temple and starts worshipping the great-grandfather.

He turns out to be an irresponsible husband and father, and his wife is forced to take to farming to feed the family.

== Cast ==
- Sreenivasan as Shekharan, the protagonist.
- Sandhya Rajendran as Malini, wife of Shekharan.
- Harikeshan Thampi
- V. K. Sriraman as an affluent relative of Shekharan.
