= Manjukalavum Kazhinju =

- Directed by: Benni Saradhi
- Written by: Vashyavachas
- Screenplay by: Vashyavachas
- Produced by: Moncy B. Pulikkottil; M. Jayarajan
- Starring: Manoj K. Jayan; Nedumudi Venu; Sudheesh; Sukanya
- Cinematography: M. J. Radhakrishnan
- Edited by: Venugopal
- Music by: Johnson
- Production company: Mainstream Films
- Distributed by: Mainstream Films
- Release date: 1998
- Country: India
- Language: Malayalam

Manjukalavum Kazhinju is a 1998 Indian Malayalam film, directed by Benni Saradhi and produced by Moncy B. Pulikkottil and M. Jayarajan. Written by Vashyavachas The film stars Manoj K. Jayan, Nedumudi Venu, Sudheesh and Sukanya in the lead roles. The film has musical score by Johnson.

== Cast ==
- Manoj K. Jayan
- Nedumudi Venu
- Sudheesh
- Sukanya
- Irshad (actor)

== Soundtrack ==
The music was composed by Johnson.

| No. | Song | Singers | Lyrics | Length (m:ss) |
|---|---|---|---|---|
| 1 | "Atham Pathinu Muttathethum" | K. S. Chithra, M. G. Sreekumar | Gireesh Puthenchery | |
| 2 | "Poovaamkurunnila" | K. S. Chithra | Gireesh Puthenchery | |
| 3 | "Swarna Dala Kodikal" | K. J. Yesudas | Gireesh Puthenchery | |
| 4 | "Swarna Dala Kodikal" | K. S. Chithra | Gireesh Puthenchery | |
