= Rajahamsam =

- Directed by: Hariharan
- Written by: K. T. Muhammad
- Screenplay by: K. T. Muhammad
- Produced by: Hari Pothan
- Starring: Prem Nazir; Jayabharathi; Srividya; Vidhubala
- Edited by: G. Venkittaraman
- Music by: G. Devarajan
- Production company: Supriya
- Distributed by: Supriya
- Release date: 11 October 1974
- Country: India
- Language: Malayalam

Rajahamsam (transl. Royal Swan) is a 1974 Indian Malayalam-language film directed by Hariharan and produced by Hari Pothan. The film stars Prem Nazir, Jayabharathi, Srividya and Vidhubala in the lead roles. This film is remade in Telugu as Indradhanussu with Telugu Superstar Krishna and Sarada and it become huge hit in 1977 by Sankranti movies. The film has musical score by G. Devarajan.

== Plot ==
The movie's backstory is that Chandran, a scion of a rich family, had fallen in love with a girl from a poor family. When he told his parents that he wanted to marry her, his powerful father threatened his girlfriend's family. They refused to let her marry Chandran and she died by suicide. Heartbroken, he comes to spend some time in a guest house in the mountains.

There, he meets a small boy. He likes the boy and talks to him often. But the boy's mother becomes furious seeing Chandran interacting with the boy. She beats him up and takes him home. Chandran is crestfallen at the situation. The guesthouse caretaker explains that the boy's mother, Radha, is actually his aunt. Radha's elder sister, Sarasu, was taken advantage of by a rich young man who had come to live in the guesthouse. He left Sarasu pregnant and she died after giving birth to the boy. Radha began hating rich people, blaming them for her sister's death.

Chandran had decided to marry a girl from a family that was not as rich as his, and since he liked Radha, he expressed his wish to marry her to her parents. Radha refuses the proposal and Chandran goes back home disheartened. Towards the end, she realizes he is sincere and agrees to marry him.

== Cast ==
- Prem Nazir as Chandran
- Jayabharathi as Radha
- Srividya as Sarasu
- K. P. A. C. Lalitha
- Adoor Bhasi as Driver Krishnankutty
- Sankaradi as Radha's father
- T. R. Omana Nanukuttans Mother
- Raghavan as Janardhanan
- T. S. Muthaiah as Chandrans Father
- Bahadoor as Watcher & Nanukuttans Father
- J. A. R. Anand
- Jameela Malik as Shakunthala
- K. P. Ummer as Soman
- M. G. Soman as Nanukuttan
- Master Raghu as Rajan
- Meena as Chandrans Mother
- P. R. Menon
- Thaha
- Paravoor Bharathan as Padhmanabhan
- Shamsudeen
- Vidhubala as Radha

== Soundtrack ==
The music was composed by G. Devarajan.

| No. | Song | Singers | Lyrics | Length (m:ss) |
|---|---|---|---|---|
| 1 | "Shakunthale" | Ayiroor Sadasivan | Vayalar | |
| 2 | "Keshabhaaram Kabariyil" | Manoharan | Vayalar | |
| 3 | "Pachilayum Kathrikayum" | Jayachandran | Vayalar | |
| 4 | "Chembakam Pookkunna" | P. Madhuri | Vayalar | |
| 5 | "Priye Nin Hridayamoru" | K. J. Yesudas | Vayalar | |
| 6 | "Sanyasinee Nin" | K. J. Yesudas | Vayalar | |
