= Magrib (film) =

- A screenshot from the film featuring Murali, Saranya, Sreeraman and Sreenivasan among others
- Directed by: P. T. Kunju Muhammed
- Screenplay by: K. A. Mohandas
- Story by: P. T. Kunju Muhammed
- Starring: Murali; Sreenivasan; V. K. Sreeraman; Saranya
- Cinematography: Madhu Ambat
- Music by: Ramesh Narayan
- Production company: Mohammed Abdul Rahman Films
- Release date: 1993
- Running time: 91 minutes
- Country: India
- Language: Malayalam

Magrib (transl. Dusk or Reprieve) is a 1993 Malayalam film by P. T. Kunju Muhammed. The film explores the relative shift in the frame of references governing the familial relations in a traditional community with a specific cultural ethos — that of the Muslims in South Malabar. It stars Murali, Sreenivasan, V. K. Sreeraman and Saranya.

== Cast ==
- Murali as Razaq
- Sreenivasan as Muhammadunni
- V. K. Sreeraman as Aboobacker
- Saranya as Arifa
- Reshmi Soman
