= Mudiyanaya Puthran =

- Directed by: Ramu Kariat
- Written by: Thoppil Bhasi
- Based on: Mudiyanaya Puthran by Kerala People's Arts Club
- Produced by: T. K. Pareekutty
- Starring: Sathyan; Ambika Sukumaran
- Cinematography: A. Vincent
- Edited by: G. Venkitaraman
- Music by: Baburaj
- Release date: 22 December 1961
- Country: India
- Language: Malayalam

Mudiyanaya Puthran (transl. Prodigal Son) is a 1961 Indian Malayalam-language film, directed by Ramu Kariat. It stars Sathyan, Ambika Sukumaran, Kottayam Chellappan, P. J. Antony, J. A. R. Anand, Miss Kumari, Adoor Bhavani, Kedamangalam Ali, P. A. Thomas, Kambisseri Karunakaran, Thoppil Krishna Pillai and Adoor Bhasi.

The film was an adaptation of the popular stage play written by Thoppil Bhasi in 1957. The film was shot at Vijaya and Vauhini Studios. It is one of the best social movies in Malayalam, which boldly told the real-life struggles of workers, projected social evils like untouchability, etc. It won the National Film Award for Best Feature Film in Malayalam.

== Cast ==
- Sathyan
- Miss Kumari
- Ambika Sukumaran
- Adoor Bhasi
- P. J. Antony
- P. A. Thomas
- Adoor Bhavani
- J. A. R. Anand
- Kambissery Karunakaran
- Kedamangalam Ali
- Kottayam Chellappan
- Thoppil Krishna Pillai

== Production ==
Mudiyanaya Puthran is based on the Kerala People's Arts Club's play of the same name.

== Soundtrack ==
All lyrics are written by P. Bhaskaran except where noted; all music is composed by Baburaj.

| No. | Title | Lyrics | Artist(s) | Length |
|---|---|---|---|---|
| 1. | "Aa Ponathaaru" |
| 2. | "Chanchala Chanchala" | | P. Leela, Kaviyoor C. K. Revamma |
| 3. | "Ellaarum Thattanu Muttanu" | | Choir, Kaviyoor C. K. Revamma, K. S. George, Mehboob, Santha P. Nair |
| 4. | "Ethra Manoharam" | G. Sankara Kurup | Santha P. Nair |
| 5. | "Mayilaadum Mala Maamala" | | Santha P. Nair |
| 6. | "Onathumbi Onathumbi" | | Kaviyoor C. K. Revamma |
| 7. | "Pachanellu Elelam" | | Choir |
| 8. | "Pottichirikkaruthe" | | P. Leela, Choir |
| 9. | "Pulmadamanelum" | | Santha P. Nair |
| 10. | "Thengidalle" | | Santha P. Nair |
| 11. | "Thengidalle" (Bit) | | K. P. Udayabhanu |
| 12. | "Thinakkam Theyyakkam" | | Choir, K. S. George, Mehboob, Santha P. Nair |

== Awards ==
National Film Awards

- 1961: President's silver medal for Best Feature Film in Malayalam
