= J. M. Raju =

John Mattupurathu Raju
- Born: 1 January 1944 (age 82); Kochi, Kerala, India
- Genres: Playback singing, Carnatic music
- Occupation: Singer
- Instrument: Vocals
- Years active: 1962–1999
- Label: Audiotracs

John Mattupurathu Raju is an Indian film singer and music composer in Malayalam cinema during the 1970s. He made his debut with the movie Naadan Pennu in 1967.

== Personal life ==
Raju was born on 1 January 1944 in Ernakulam, Kerala, as the son of the late John Mattupurathu and the late Mary John. He is married to Latha Raju, a Malayalam playback singer, who is the daughter of famous singers Santha P. Nair and K. Padmanabhan Nair. The couple have two children, Aalap Raju and Anupama. Aalap Raju is also a playback singer. In 2015 Raju won the Kalashree Award from the Kerala Sangeeta Nataka Academy.

== Filmography ==
=== As a music composer ===
- Nadi Nadi (K. J. Yesudas) Chevalier Michael 1992 - Lyrics Yusufali Kechery
- Bhaagyam vannu (Krishnachandran), (J. M. Raju) Chevalier Michael 1992 - Lyrics Yusufali Kechery
- Vaanil Vibhaatham (K. J. Yesudas), (Latha Raju) Chevalier Michael 1992 - Lyrics Yusufali Kechery
- Kaathirunna Raavu (K. J. Yesudas) Chevalier Michael 1992 - Lyrics Yusufali Kechery
- Kannaadikkaavilile (K. S. Chithra),(Krishnachandran) Chevalier Michael 1992 - Lyrics Yusufali Kechery
- Navayuva Midhunam Keralam Manoharam 1999 - Lyrics Yusufali Kechery
- Anuraagame Keralam Manoharam 1999 - Lyrics Yusufali Kechery
- Prasada Sindooram (Srinivas) Keralam Manoharam 1999 - Lyrics Shaji Chen
- Paalaruvi Neeyenikku Thozhi (K. S. Chithra) Keralam Manoharam 1999 - Lyrics Shaji Chen

=== As a playback singer ===
- Naadan Premam ... Naadan Pennu 1967
- Paalkadal Naduvil ... Kanaatha Veshangal 1967
- Raathri Raathri ... Ezhu Raathrikal 1968
- Pottithakarnna ... Baalya Prathijna (Purusharathnam) 1972
- Marathakappattudutha Vilaasini ... Baalya Prathijna (Purusharathnam) 1972
- Kala kala mozhi ... Premageethangal 1981
- Ilam Manjil ... Adharangal Vithumpunnu 1981
- Ambili Manavatti azhakulla manavaatti ... Ee Naadu 1982
- Thattedi Sosamme ... Ee Naadu 1982
- Aakaasha perunthachan ... Ee Naadu 1982
- Iru Meyyaanennaalum [Bit] ... Ee Naadu 1982
- Amme mahaamaaye ... Jambulingam 1982
- Amme Kanyaamariyame (Chilluvazhi Paayum) ... Idavela 1982
- Gloria Gloria Gloria Swargeeya (Vinnin Saanthi Sandesham) ... Idavela 1982
- Ente kadha ninte kadha ... Ithu Njangalude Kadha 1982
- Thathammappenninu kalyaanam ... Thuranna Jail 1982
- Swarga Vaathil Thurannu Thannu ... Iniyenkilum 1983
- Ilam Manjil [Adharangal Vithumbunnu] ... Kaathirunna Divasam 1983
- Poonkili painkili ... Kolakkomban 1983
- Odi odi odi vannu ... Swanthamevide Bandhamevide 1984
- Illillam Poo ... Akalangalil 1986
- Bhaagyam vannu ... Chevalier Michael 1992
