= K. Kuppuswamy =

Indian politician

K. Kuppuswamy is an Indian politician and a former Member of the Legislative Assembly of Tamil Nadu. He was elected to the Tamil Nadu legislative assembly as an Anna Dravida Munnetra Kazhagam candidate from Oddanchatram constituency in the 1980 and 1984 elections.

== Awards ==
National Film Awards

- 1961: Certificate of Merit for Third Best Feature Film in Malayalam - Sabarimala Ayyappan
