= K. Padmanabhan Nair =

Indian film director

- Born: 1919; Payyanur, Kannur district, Kerala
- Died: 1990 (aged 70–71)
- Occupation: Film director
- Years active: 1963 – 1970
- Spouse: Santha P. Nair
- Children: Latha Raju
- Parent(s): Kaithari Raman Nambiar, Kutty Amma

K. Padmanabhan Nair (1919–1990) was an Indian film director, scriptwriter in Malayalam movies. He did dialogue, story and script for almost 20 movies and directed 5 Malayalam movies during the 1960s. He is a recipient of the Kerala Sangeetha Nataka Akademi Award (1981). He died in 1990.

== Personal life ==
He was born to Kaithari Raman Nambiar and Kutty Amma at Payyanur in 1919. He worked at All India Radio since 1944. He received Kerala State Awards for the stories, Thacholi Othenan and Kunjalimarakkar. He was married to Santha P. Nair, a popular Malayalam film playback singer in its early days. They have a daughter Latha Raju. Playback singer J. M. Raju is his son-in-law. His grandson Aalap Raju is also a playback singer.

== Filmography ==
=== Dialogue ===
- Moodupadam (1963)
- Thacholi Othenan (1964)
- Kochumon (1965)
- Devatha (1965)
- Kadathukaaran (1965)
- Kunjaali Marakkaar (1967)
- NGO (1967)
- Vidhi (1968)
- Sandhya (1969)

=== Screenplay ===
- Thacholi Othenan (1964)
- Kochumon (1965)
- Devatha (1965)
- Kadathukaaran (1965)
- Kunjaali Marakkaar (1967)
- NGO (1967)
- Vidhi (1968)

=== Story ===
- Devatha (1965)
- Kadathukaaran (1965)
- Kunjaali Marakkaar (1967)
- NGO (1967)
- Vijayanum Veeranum (1979)

=== Direction ===
- Kochumon (1965)
- Devatha (1965)
