= Neelakuyil =

1954 Malayalam film

- Theatrical release poster
- Directed by: P. Bhaskaran; Ramu Kariat
- Screenplay by: Uroob; P. Bhaskaran
- Story by: Uroob
- Produced by: T. K. Pareekutty
- Starring: Sathyan; Miss Kumari; P. Bhaskaran; Prema Menon; Master Vipin; Manavalan Joseph; Abin VC
- Cinematography: A. Vincent
- Edited by: T. R. Sreenivasalu
- Music by: K. Raghavan
- Production company: Chandrathara Productions
- Distributed by: Chandrathara Pictures
- Release date: 22 October 1954
- Running time: 171 minutes
- Country: India
- Language: Malayalam
- Budget: ₹1 lakh (equivalent to ₹1.0 crore or US$100,000 in 2023)

Neelakuyil (transl. The Blue Koel) is a 1954 Malayalam film jointly directed by P. Bhaskaran and Ramu Kariat. It is a neo-realistic melodrama based on a story by Uroob who co-wrote the screenplay and dialogues along with P. Bhaskaran. It stars Sathyan, Miss Kumari, Prema, P. Bhaskaran and Master Vipin. The plot revolves around Neeli, a Dalit peasant girl, who falls in love with Sreedharan Nair, a high caste teacher.

The screenplay was written by acclaimed author Uroob and P. Bhaskaran, with encouragement from their friends. P. Bhaskaran wanted to make a film about social issues when he decided to make a film. His finished draft was greenlit immediately by T. K. Pareekutty. Since Satyan and Bhaskaran were close friends, he was asked to essay the role of Sridharan Nair. The film was a breakthrough for Sathyan, who went on to become a matinee idol in Kerala. It features an cinematography by A. Vincent and a musical score by K. Raghavan.

Neelakuyil was released on 22 October 1954 to critical acclaim. The film was a major commercial success and went on to become the highest grossing Malayalam film at the time, a feat rare for a relatively unknown cast. The script was praised for its hard-hitting dialogues against social evils such as untouchability, feudalism and injustices towards women.The performance of the cast, who spoke in the regional dialect was also critically acclaimed. The narrative style was also acclaimed for diverging from the regular style of narration. The film won the All India Certificate of Merit for Best Feature Film at the 2nd National Film Awards, becoming the first South Indian film to win the award.

== Cast ==
- Sathyan as Sreedharan Nair(real Father of Neeli's Child)
- Miss Kumari as Neeli
- Prema as Nalini(wife of Sreedharan Nair)
- P. Bhaskaran as Shankaran Nair, the postmaster(adoptive father of Neeli's Child)
- Manavalan Joseph as Naanu Nair

== Soundtrack ==
There are nine songs, scored by K. Raghavan and penned by P. Bhaskaran, in a soundtrack regarded as a milestone in Malayalam film music history. Before Neelakuyil, Malayalam film soundtracks only had Hindi and Tamil songs. Raghavan introduced Malayali folk music into films by including them in the soundtrack. The musical genres utilised included Mappilappattu (Islamic music), Koyithupattu (a form of harvest singing), traditional prayers, romantic melodies, all of which emanated from the folk traditions of Kerala. The songs were choreographed by Guru Gopalakrishnan Kodungallur.

Song	Singer(s)
"Ellarum Chollanu, Ellarum Chollanu"	Janamma David
"Kayalarikaathu Vala Erinjappol"	K. Raghavan
"Unarunaroo Unnikanna"	Shantha P. Nair
"Kadalasu Vanchi Eri"	Kozhikode Pushpa
"Maanennum Vilikkilla"	Mehboob (singer)
"Kuyiline Thedi"	Janamma David
"Engane Nee Marakkum Kuyile"	Kozhikode Abdul Kader

The song "Kayalarikaathu Vala Erinjappol" was used in Deepan Sivaraman's stage adaptation of O V Vijayan's magnum opus, Khasakkinte Itihasam.

== Release ==
The film was released on 22 October 1954. The film was a box office success, running successfully for many weeks in packed theatres.

Neelakuyil received critical acclaim.

On 7 November 1954, Cynic of Mathrubhoomi wrote, "Uroob, who wrote the story, screenplay and dialogues, deserves credit for the film's success. He succeeded in creating characters that connect well with the common people. Though some of these characters do not have any function in the linear progression of the narrative, they do not bore us because of their authentic portrayal." Further writing, "The vibrant, lively dialogues ooze life into the film. The outdoor shots, used in plenty, succeed in conveying the sense that the story takes place in Kerala. The Uchikuduma of the Nair Karanavar, the Namboodiri's pan-box, the traditional evening lamp customarily lit beside the Thulasi plant at the Nair house, the village restaurant, the Marar and his drum, the Mappila's fishing net... all these add to the Kerala-ness of the film. He concludes writing "Though Moithu's character does not fit into the narrative scheme, the role was essayed excellently by Balakrishna Menon." Film historian, Jenson Joseph said, "If Social Realism in Indian cinema meant melodramatic rendering of the issues of the poor and the oppressed, Neelakuyil fits perfectly into this genre."

== Awards ==
- 1954 - All India Certificate of Merit for Best Feature Film
- 1954 - President's Silver Medal for Best Feature Film in Malayalam

== Legacy ==
In 2012, Jenny Rovin wrote, "Pre-Neelakuyil Malayalam cinema largely resembled Tamil cinema, if not, a poor imitation of it. Neelakuyil was the first film to break out of this and give Malayalam cinema its identity." The Times of India called it "the first authentic Malayalam film." The film won the All India Certificate of Merit for Best Feature Film, and the National Film Award for Best Feature Film in Malayalam, thus becoming the first nationally recognized Malayalam film. B. Vijayakumar of The Hindu wrote, "Neelakuyil was a landmark film in Malayalam cinema history that paved a new path for Malayalam cinema by breaking away from the earlier tradition of adapting plots from Hindi films for making Malayalam films, of which the story or the characters could never be identified with the culture of Kerala." Randor Guy of The Hindu wrote, "This film put Malayalam Cinema on the Indian movie map when it won the President's Silver Medal at the National Film Festival. Neelakuyil was the first Malayalam film to come to grips with social realism and was a protest movie, the likes of which had not been attempted before with such depth and commitment." Rajadhyaksha and Willemen, in Encyclopedia of Indian Cinema, wrote, " The trend of realist melodrama inaugurated by this film was to continue for over 20 years, in Kariat's own work and e.g. in Vincent's M.T. Vasudevan Nair films"
