= Uppu =

- Directed by: V. K. Pavithran
- Written by: K. M. A. Rahim
- Produced by: K. M. A. Rahim
- Starring: P. T. Kunju Muhammed; Jayalalitha; Vijayan Kottarathil; Madhavan
- Cinematography: Madhu Ambat
- Edited by: Venugopal
- Music by: Saratchandra Marathe
- Production company: Eranadan Movies
- Distributed by: Jubilee Productions
- Release date: 5 August 1987
- Running time: 117 minutes
- Country: India
- Language: Malayalam

Uppu (English: Salt, French: Le Sel) is a 1987 Indian Malayalam film, directed by V. K. Pavithran and written by K. M. A. Rahim. The film is about the atavistic Muslim practice of male polygamy. The film is entirely on the side of the wronged wives, mounting a strong criticism of this aspect of the Muslim religion. It stars P. T. Kunju Muhammed, Jayalalitha, Vijayan Kottarathil and Madhavan. The film won the National Film Award for Best Feature Film in Malayalam.

== Cast ==
- P. T. Kunju Muhammed as Abu
- Jayalalita as Amina
- Bharathi as Khadeeja
- Vijayan Kottarathil as Meleri Moosa
- Madhavan as Moidutty Mudalali
- Sadiq as Saleem
- Mullanezhi as Nanu Nair
- Valsala Menon as Mariyambi
- V. K. Sreeraman as Abdul Rahman Musaliyar
- C. V. Sreeraman as Khazi (religious leader)
- Preetha A as Abu's daughter
