= P. T. Kunju Muhammed =

Indian politician

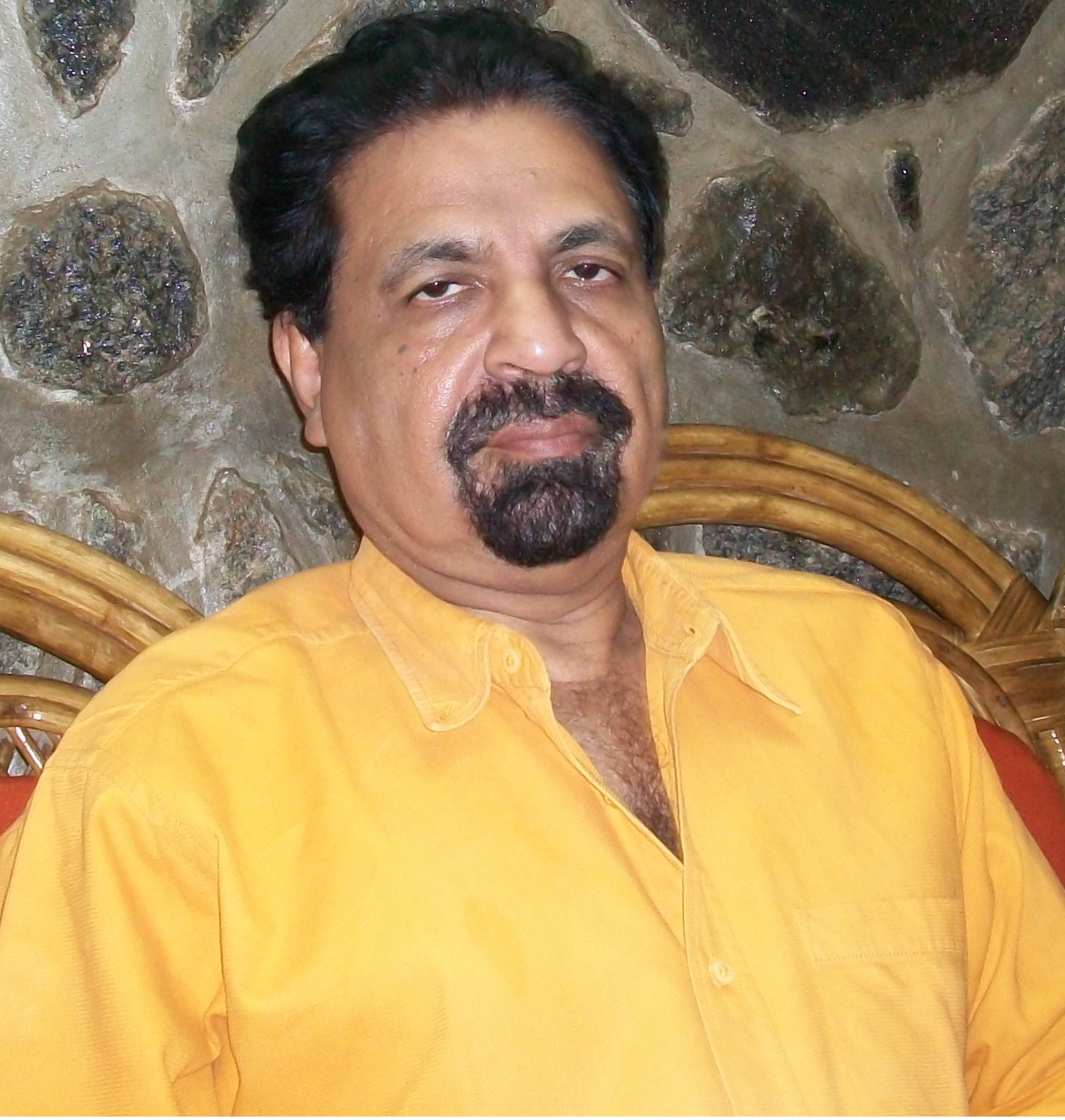
- Born: 1949 (age 76–77); Chavakkad, Kerala, India
- Occupation: Film Director
- Spouse: Ayishabi

Pancharamukku T. Kunju Muhammed is a director and producer in the Malayalam film industry. Magrib was his first film venture. He received a number of awards for his movies at the state level.

== Personal life ==
He is a native of Pancharamukku near Chavakkad in Thrissur district, Kerala. He is married and they have two children. Kunju Muhammed was elected twice to the Kerala legislative assembly as a left independent candidate in 1994 and 1996. He graduated in mathematics from St. Thomas College, Thrissur.

In December, 2025 he was accused by a fellow film worker of sexual misconduct during International Film Festival of Kerala-2025. A case was registered against him.

== Film career ==
His debut film was Magrib (1993). Later he directed Garshom (1998), Paradeshi (2007) and Veeraputhran (2011). These films received critical acclaim and won a number of awards. Kunhimohammed's entry into film was as a producer and an actor. He was involved in the production of Aswathamavu, Swaroopam, Purushartham all directed by K. R. Mohanan. He acted in the movie Uppu (Salt) which was directed by Pavithran.

Kunhimohammed is one of the founder directors of the Malayalam Channel Kairali TV. Currently, he is presenting a popular program in Kairali TV the so-called ‘Pravasalokam’, a program that helps locate missing Kerala expatriates in different parts of the world.

== Filmography ==
- 2017-Viswasapoorvam Mansoor
- 2011- Veeraputhran
- 2007- Paradesi
- 1998- Garshom
- 1993- Magrib
- 1987- Uppu
