= Snehaseema =

- Poster
- Directed by: S. S. Rajan
- Written by: Ponkunnam Varkey
- Based on: Snehaseema by Ponkunnam Varkey
- Produced by: T. E. Vasudevan
- Starring: Sathyan; Padmini; G. K. Pillai; Kottarakkara Sreedharan Nair; Muthukulam Raghavan Pillai; S. P. Pillai; P. J. Cheriyan; Baby Lalitha
- Cinematography: H. S. Venu
- Edited by: M. S. Mani
- Music by: V. Dakshinamoorthy
- Production company: Associated Productions
- Release date: 30 December 1954
- Country: India
- Language: Malayalam

Snehaseema is a 1954 Indian Malayalam-language film, directed by S. S. Rajan and written by Ponkunnam Varkey based on his novel of the same name, which is a retelling of L. A. Tennyson's Enoch Arden in the context of Kerala culture. The lead roles were played by Sathyan, Padmini, G. K. Pillai, Muthukulam Raghavan Pillai, S. P. Pillai, P. J. Cheriyan, Baby Lalitha and Kottarakkara Sreedharan Nair. It received a certificate of merit at the 2nd National Film Awards.

This film was dubbed in Tamil, with the title Punniyavathi and released in 1956.

== Plot ==
Johnny grew grew and become big under the care of a priest. Rich Baby and Omana, the daughter of school manager Poopally Thomas, and Johnny are childhood friends. As they grew older, Baby became a doctor and Johnny became a teacher at Thomas' school. Baby was born with the desire to marry the beautiful Omana. And it was good for Thomas. But Omana's heart flowed to poor Johnny's barn. Despite Thomas' objections, Omana married Johnny with the blessing of the priest.

Johnny's voice and movement, which Johnny wanted to see justice done, seemed offensive to Thomas. Soon after, Johnny resigned from school. Meanwhile, Omana had become the mother of a beloved child. Johnny, who was struggling to support his family, joined the Air Force. Gradually he became a pilot officer. Memories of Johnny in the struggle were copied on his beloved baby's smile and he received a letter informing Johnny Lee that Christmas was coming next Christmas. As people all over the country sang Christian hymns, Omana, who was waiting to hear Johnny's footsteps, received a message from Johnny, who had died in a plane crash.

Desperate, Omana hugs her baby and the father, Thomas, dies, just as Johnny remembers. Omana married Dr. Baby in accordance with her father's last wishes and respecting the favorable advice of the priest. By then, Johnny had somehow escaped from the hands of death and returned home. Johnny, unaware of the facts of the incident, prepares to commit suicide as he cannot bear the heartache. Baby treats Johnny. Identifies Johnny when giving the injection. Johnny dies of emotional turmoil. Omana also died of a heart attack. The story ends with two coffins moving.

== Cast ==
- Sathyan
- Padmini
- Kottarakkara Sreedharan Nair
- G. K. Pillai
- Muthukulam Raghavan Pillai
- S. P. Pillai
- Ramankutty Menon
- P. J. Cheriyan
- Baby Lalitha

== Soundtrack ==
The songs are scored by V. Dakshinamoorthy.

Title	Lyricist	Singers
Adhwaanikkunnavarkkum	Abhayadev	P Leela, Saroja, Chorus
Anayaathe Nilppu	Abhayadev	P Leela
Innu Varum En Naayakan	Abhayadev	P Leela
Jagadeeshwara Leelakal	Abhayadev	AM Raja
Kanivolum Kamaneeyahridayam	Abhayadev	P Leela
Kannum Poottiyuranguka	Abhayadev	AM Raja, P Leela
Kannum Poottiyuranguka	Abhayadev	P Leela
Kochilam Kaattathu	Abhayadev	Saroja
Maanam Thelinju Mazhakkaru Maanju	Abhayadev	P Leela
Mahalthyaagame	Abhayadev	AM Raja
Mazhayellaam Poyallo	Abhayadev	Saroja, Amritheswari, Chorus
Poyvaroo Nee Poyvaroo	Abhayadev	P Leela
Vannu Vannu Christmas	Abhayadev	AM Raja, M Sathyam
Koottukaar Ninne Vilippathenthe	V Anandakkuttan Nair	Saroja, Chorus
