= 9th National Film Awards =

Indian ceremony celebrating cinema of 1961

- Awarded for: Best of Indian cinema in 1961
- Awarded by: Ministry of Information and Broadcasting
- Presented by: Sarvepalli Radhakrishnan (Vice President of India)
- Announced on: 5 April 1962
- Presented on: 21 April 1962
- Site: Vigyan Bhavan, New Delhi
- Official website: dff.nic.in
- Best Feature Film: Bhagini Nivedita

The 9th National Film Awards, then known as State Awards for Films, presented by Ministry of Information and Broadcasting, India to felicitate the best of Indian Cinema released in 1961. The awards were announced on 5 April 1962 and were presented on 21 April at the Vigyan Bhavan in New Delhi, by then Vice-President of India, Dr. Sarvepalli Radhakrishnan.

== Selection process ==
The Central Committee for State Awards for Films for the year was headed by politician and author R. R. Diwakar. To select films for the awards, the committee viewed "27 feature films, five children's films, seven documentaries and six educational films and a few filmstrips" between 19 March and 2 April 1962.

== Awards ==
Awards were divided into feature films and non-feature films.

President's Gold Medal for the All India Best Feature Film is now better known as National Film Award for Best Feature Film, whereas President's Gold Medal for the Best Documentary Film is analogous to today's National Film Award for Best Non-Feature Film. For children's films, Prime Minister's Gold Medal is now given as National Film Award for Best Children's Film. At the regional level, President's Silver Medal for Best Feature Film is now given as National Film Award for Best Feature Film in a particular language. Certificate of Merit in all the categories is discontinued over the years.

=== Feature films ===
Feature films were awarded at All India as well as regional level. For the 9th National Film Awards, a Bengali film Bhagini Nivedita won the President's Gold Medal for the All India Best Feature Film. Following were the awards given:

==== All India Award ====
Following were the awards given in each category:

Award	Film	Language	Awardee(s)	Cash prize
President's Gold Medal for the All India Best Feature Film	Bhagini Nivedita	Bengali	Producer: Aurora Film Corporation	Gold Medal and ₹20,000
President's Gold Medal for the All India Best Feature Film	Bhagini Nivedita	Bengali	Director: Bijoy Bose	₹5,000
All India Certificate of Merit for the Second Best Feature Film	Pava Mannippu	Tamil	Producer: Buddha Pictures	Certificate of Merit and ₹10,000
All India Certificate of Merit for the Second Best Feature Film	Pava Mannippu	Tamil	Director: A. Bhimsingh	₹2,500
All India Certificate of Merit for the Third Best Feature Film	Prapanch	Marathi	Producer: Indian National Pictures	Certificate of Merit only
All India Certificate of Merit for the Third Best Feature Film	Prapanch	Marathi	Director: Madhukar Pathak	Certificate of Merit only
Prime Minister's Gold Medal for the Best Children's Film	Hattogol Vijay	Hindi	Producer: Hari S. Dasgupta Productions	Gold Medal and ₹20,000
Prime Minister's Gold Medal for the Best Children's Film	Hattogol Vijay	Hindi	Director: Buju Das Gupta	₹5,000
Prime Minister's Gold Medal for the Best Children's Film	Hattogol Vijay	Hindi	Director: Raghunath Goswami	₹5,000
All India Certificate of Merit for the Second Best Children's Film	Savitri	Hindi	Producer: Children's Film Society	Certificate of Merit and ₹10,000
All India Certificate of Merit for the Second Best Children's Film	Savitri	Hindi	Director: Phani Majumdar	₹2,500
All India Certificate of Merit for the Third Best Children's Film	Nanhe Munne Sitare	Hindi	Producer: Ajay Kumar Chakravarty	Certificate of Merit only
All India Certificate of Merit for the Third Best Children's Film	Nanhe Munne Sitare	Hindi	Director: Ajay Kumar Chakravarty	Certificate of Merit only

==== Regional Award ====
The awards were given to the best films made in the regional languages of India. For 9th National Film Awards, President's Silver Medal for Best Feature Film was not given in Gujarati, Kannada and Odia language; instead Certificate of Merit was awarded in each particular language.

Award	Film	Awardee(s)	
Award	Film	Producer	Director
Feature Films in Assamese
President's Silver Medal for Best Feature Film	Shakuntala	Kamrup Chitra	Bhupen Hazarika
Feature Films in Bengali
President's Silver Medal for Best Feature Film	Samapti	Satyajit Ray	Satyajit Ray
Certificate of Merit for Second Best Feature Film	Saptapadi	Uttam Kumar	Ajoy Kar
Certificate of Merit for Third Best Feature Film	Punascha	Mrinal Sen	Mrinal Sen
Feature Films in Gujarati
Certificate of Merit for Best Feature Film	Nandanvan	Shrikumar V. Gaglani	Ganpatrao Brahmbhatt
Feature Films in Hindi
President's Silver Medal for Best Feature Film	Dharmputra	B. R. Chopra	Yash Chopra
Certificate of Merit for Second Best Feature Film	Gunga Jumna	Dilip Kumar	Nitin Bose
Certificate of Merit for Third Best Feature Film	Pyaar Ki Pyaas	Anupam Chitra	Mahesh Kaul
Feature Films in Kannada
Certificate of Merit for Best Feature Film	Kittur Chennamma	Padmini Pictures	B. R. Panthulu
Feature Films in Malayalam
President's Silver Medal for Best Feature Film	Mudiyanaya Puthran	Chandrathara Productions	Ramu Kariat
Certificate of Merit for Second Best Feature Film	Kandam Becha Kottu	Modern Theatres	T. R. Sundaram
Certificate of Merit for Third Best Feature Film	Sabarimala Sri Ayyappan	K. Kuppuswamy	S. M. Sriramulu Naidu
Feature Films in Marathi
President's Silver Medal for Best Feature Film	Manini	Kala Chitra	Anant Mane
Certificate of Merit for Second Best Feature Film	Vaijayanta	Rekha Films	Gajanan Jagirdar
Certificate of Merit for Third Best Feature Film	Manasala Pankh Astat	Madhav Shinde	Madhav Shinde
Feature Films in Odia
Certificate of Merit for Best Feature Film	Nua Bou	Ram Krishna Tripathy	Prabhat Mukherjee
Feature Films in Tamil
President's Silver Medal for Best Feature Film	Kappalottiya Thamizhan	Padmini Pictures	B. R. Panthulu
Certificate of Merit for Second Best Feature Film	Pasamalar	Rajamani Pictures	A. Bhimsingh
Certificate of Merit for Third Best Feature Film	Kumudham	Modern Theatres	Adurthi Subba Rao
Feature Films in Telugu
President's Silver Medal for Best Feature Film	Bharya Bharthalu	Prasad Art Pictures Pvt Ltd.	K. Pratyagatma

=== Non-Feature films ===
Non-feature film awards were given for the documentaries and educational films made in the country. Following were the awards given:

==== Documentaries ====
Award	Film	Language	Awardee(s)	Cash prize
President's Gold Medal for the Best Documentary Film	Rabindranath Tagore (Longer Version)	English	Producer: Films Division	Gold Medal and ₹4,000
President's Gold Medal for the Best Documentary Film	Rabindranath Tagore (Longer Version)	English	Director: Satyajit Ray	₹1,000
All India Certificate of Merit for the Second Best Documentary Film	Our Feathered Friends	English	Producer: Films Division	Certificate of Merit and ₹2,000
All India Certificate of Merit for the Second Best Documentary Film	Our Feathered Friends	English	Director: Gopal Datt	₹500
All India Certificate of Merit for the Third Best Documentary Film	Romance of the Indian Coin	English	Producer: Films Division	Certificate of Merit only
All India Certificate of Merit for the Third Best Documentary Film	Romance of the Indian Coin	English	Director: G. H. Saraiya	Certificate of Merit only

==== Educational films ====
Award	Film	Language	Awardee(s)	Cash prize
Prime Minister's Gold Medal for the Best Educational Film	Citrus Cultivation	English	Producer: Films Division	Gold Medal and ₹4,000
Prime Minister's Gold Medal for the Best Educational Film	Citrus Cultivation	English	Director: Krishna Kapil	₹1,000
All India Certificate of Merit for the Second Best Educational Film	Coir Worker	English	Producer: F. R. Bilimoria	Certificate of Merit only
All India Certificate of Merit for the Second Best Educational Film	Coir Worker	English	Director: F. R. Bilimoria	Certificate of Merit only
All India Certificate of Merit for the Third Best Educational Film	Ahvan	Hindi	Producer: Dhruva Kumar Pandya	Certificate of Merit only
All India Certificate of Merit for the Third Best Educational Film	Ahvan	Hindi	Director: Dhruva Kumar Pandya	Certificate of Merit only

=== Awards not given ===
Following were the awards not given as no film was found to be suitable for the award:

- President's Silver Medal for Best Feature Film in Kannada
- President's Silver Medal for Best Feature Film in Oriya
