= Rarichan Enna Pauran =

- Poster
- Directed by: P. Bhaskaran
- Written by: Uroob
- Produced by: T. K. Pareekkutty
- Starring: Vilasini; Prema; Master Latheef; Padmanabhan
- Cinematography: B. J. Reddy
- Edited by: T. R. Sreenivasalu
- Music by: K. Raghavan
- Production company: Chandrathara Productions
- Release date: 10 February 1956
- Country: India
- Language: Malayalam

Rarichan Enna Pauran (transl. Citizen Rarichan) is a 1956 Indian Malayalam-language film written by Uroob and directed by P. Bhaskaran. The film marks the debut of the noted Malayalam film actor K. P. Ummer. The cast includes Vilasini, Prema, Master Latheef, Padmanabhan and Mrs. K. P. Raman Nair, Abdul Kader Chullickal.

== Plot ==
The story is about a young orphan boy who steals money to help the daughter of his benefactress to marry. The story is set in a village of north Kerala. The feudal landlord demolishes the house and belongings of the labor Chozhi. Chozhi kills the landlord as a revenge and is imprisoned. His wife gets affected psychologically and dies soon after. As a result, Chozhi's son Rarichan becomes an orphan. He gets a job at the tea shop run by Biyyathumma and her young daughter Khadeeja. Khadeeja is in love with Mohammed Ali, the son of the rich beedi shop owner Saidali, who is opposed to this relationship. Annamma, the daughter of the coffin vendor Kariachan also loves Mohammed Ali. Mohammed Ali was firm in his decision to marry Khadeeja unaware of Annamma's silent love for him.

Saidali demands a dowry of Rs. 300 for his son's marriage with Khadeeja. Biyyathumma is unable to give this amount as dowry. Rarichan comes to the rescue of Biyyathumma's family and gives the dowry amount. Biyyathumma believed that the money was from Rarichan's mother's savings. But the Police arrests Rarichan's friend Sankaran for stealing money from the landlord's house. Rarichan owns up for the crime and surrenders before the police. He is sentenced and sent to a juvenile home.

== Cast ==
- Vilasini as Khadeeja
- Prema Menon as Annamma
- Master Latheef as Rarichan
- Padmanabhan as Mohammed Ali
- Mrs. K. P. Raman Nair as Biyyathumma
- K. P. Ummer as Saidali
- Kalamandalam Kalyanikutty Amma as Narayani
- P. Kunhava as Khaderkka
- Sivaramakrishnan as Sankaran
- Kochappan
- Abdul Kader as Judge
