= K. R. Mohanan =

Indian film director

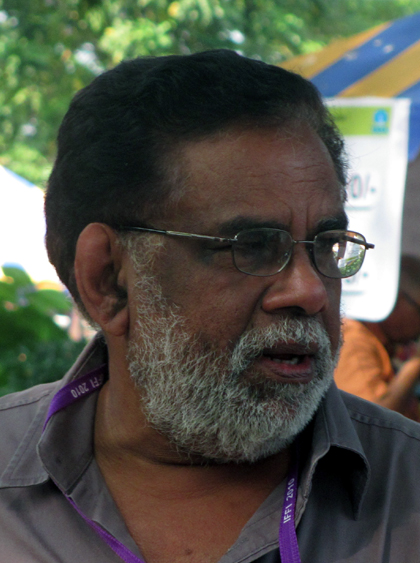
K R Mohanan

K. R. Mohanan (11 December 1947 – 25 June 2017), born at thiruvathra Chavakadu Thrissur, was a Malayalam film director best known for his critically acclaimed works, Ashwathama (1978), Purushartham (1987) and Swaroopam (1992). He studied at the Pune Film Institute. Mohanan was the Chairman of Kerala State Chalachitra Academy from 2006 to 2011 and the Director of International Film Festival of Kerala. He died of serious illness on June 25, 2017, aged 69.

== Filmography ==
- Ashwathama (1978)
- Purushartham (1987)
- Kalamandalam Krishnankutty Poduval (1989) (documentary)
- Swaroopam (1992)
- Visudhavanangal - Sacred Groves (1994) (documentary)
- Mangroves - Remnants of an Ecosystem (Oru Vanavyavasthayude Sheshippukal) (Documentary for C-DIT)
- Thyagam (2004) (Doordarshan Telefilm)
- Njattadi (1979) - as actor

== Awards ==
National Film Awards

- 1987: Best Feature Film in Malayalam – Purushartham
- 1989: Special Jury Award / Special Mention (Non-Feature Film) – Kalamandalam Krishnankutty Poduval
- 1992: Best Feature Film in Malayalam – Swaroopam

Kerala State Film Awards

- 1978: Best Film – Ashwathama
- 1987: Best Film – Purushartham
- 1994: Best Documentary – Visudhavanangal

Kerala Film Critics Association Award

- 1987: Best Film – Purushartham
- 1987: Special Jury Award for Direction – Purushartham
