= Santha P. Nair =

Background information
- Born: 6 February 1929
- Origin: Thrissur, Kerala, India
- Died: 26 July 2008 (aged 78)
- Genre: playback singing
- Occupation: Singer
- Instrument: Vocals
- Years active: 1951–1967

Shantha P. Nair (6 February 1929 – 26 July 2008) was a playback singer in Malayalam cinema. She was based in Thrissur, Kerala.

== Early life ==
Born into the famous Ambady family in Thrissur, as one of the five children of Vasudeva Poduval and Lakshmi, Santha Poduval showed her potential at a very young age. She got her education from Queen Mary's College, Chennai.

== Singing career ==
She was working in All India Radio in Kozhikode before entering playback singing. She entered the Malayalam film industry through Thiramala in (1953), her first song 'Ammathan thankakudame' (by music director Vimal Kumar) was a lullaby. She sang in hundreds of Malayalam films from 1951 to 1967 and immortalised many songs including 'Unarunaroo Unikkanna', 'Kadavathu Thoniyaduthappol', 'Poove nalla poove,' `Kuruvikalai uyaraam' and 'Kadavathu thoni aduthapol' with her mellifluous voice. She was equally proficient in Carnatic music and held many concerts, which she used to end with light music. And once, in the absence of Salil Chowdhury, she composed a tune for Ramu Kariat. After hearing it, Salilda insisted that it be retained without changes in the final release. The song was 'Makkathu poi varum maanathe'. She also did the chorus for Salilda later in the Chemmeen songs. Her last song, a collaboration with S. Janaki, was 'Kadavathu thoni aduthapol' in 1961 for V Chidambaranath's film Murapennu. She had an opportunity to sing Vande Mataram before Pandit Jawaharlal Nehru for an event. Shanta Nair won the Kerala Sangeetha Nataka Akademi Award in 1987 for her contributions to Malayalam light music. In 2005 she was awarded the fellowship of the Kerala Sangeetha Nataka Akademi. She was also awarded the Kairali Swaralaya Lifetime Achievement Award and the Lux Asianet Lifetime Achievement Award.

== Personal life ==
She was married to writer K. Padmanabhan Nair. She died in 2008 at the age of 79. She is survived by her daughter Latha Raju and son-in-law J. M. Raju, also playback singers in Malayalam movies. Her grandson Aalap Raju is a bass guitarist who has worked with the top composers of Kollywood and also a playback singer .

== Singing highlights of her career ==
- Yesudas first duet (Attention penne, Kaalpadukal)
- Vayalar's first movie (Thumbi thumbi vaa vaa, Koodapirappu)
- Vayalar & Devarajan combination first movie (Janani, Chaturangam)
- Baburaj's first composition (Vaalittu Kannezhuthanam, Minnaminungu)
- Raghavan Master's first (released) movie song (Unarunaroo, Neelakuyil)
- Her first song (Amma than thankakudame, Thiramala)
- Appam venam Ada venam from Thacholi Othenan together with P Leela, music by Baburaj

== Selected songs ==
- Unarunaru Unnikanna - Neelakuyil
- Nazhiyurippalukondu naadake kalyanam - Rarichanenna Pouran
- Poove nalla Poove - Palattu Koman
- Kadavathu Thoniyaduthappol
- Poomuttathoru mulla virinju - Rarichan enna Pouran
- Makkathu Poivarum - Ezhu Raathrikal (Music composed by her and sung by her daughter Latha Raju)
