= Ummachu =

Book by Uroob

Umachu
- The cover of Ummachu
- Author: Uroob
- Language: Malayalam
- Publisher: DC Books
- Publication date: 1954
- Publication place: India
- Pages: 264 (first edition); 199 (current edition)
- ISBN: 81-7130-230-0

Ummachu (Beloved) is a Malayalam novel written by Uroob in 1954. Ummachu and Sundarikalum Sundaranmarum are considered the best works by Uroob and are ranked among the finest novels in Malayalam. In Ummachu, Uroob explores the ramifications of human relationships in a village.

== Plot summary ==
Ummachu is in love with Mayan, her childhood friend. But much to her dislike, she is married to a rich, but timid Beeran making her marriage unhappy. Mayan manhandles the old man, the ‘village historian,’ who is supposed to have been instrumental in conducting Ummachu’s marriage with Beeran. The old man becomes unconscious and Mayan leaves the village believing that he is dead. Mayan goes to Wayanad and becomes a rich spice merchant. He returns to the village when he learns that the old man was not dead, but had later died of illness.

Ummachu lived an unhappy life with her husband and son. Mayan murders Beeran and the police arrest an innocent man for the crime. Mayan marries Ummachu. Years roll by. Abdu, Ummachu’s son is in love with their Manager’s daughter Chinnammu, a Hindu. Abdu learns that his stepfather Mayan is the murderer of his father and dislikes Ummachu because she was aware of his father's murder by Mayan. Mayan commits suicide. Ummachu divides her property between Abdu and her two sons by Mayan.

In the elections, Abdu contests as the Congress candidate against Hydros, the younger son of Ummachu by Mayan, a candidate of the ‘League’ and Hydros wins. Ignoring the strong protests from the communities, Abdu marries Chinnammu.

== Film adaptation ==
In 1971, a film adaptation of the novel was released, starring Sheela as Ummachu, Madhu as Mayan, Nellikode Bhaskaran as Beeran, and directed by P. Bhaskaran. Uroob himself scripted the film. Its music is scored by Raghunath with lyrics by P. Bhaskaran.
