= Thiramala =

1953 film

- Directed by: Vimalkumar and P.R.S. Pillai
- Written by: T. N. Gopinathan Nair
- Produced by: P. R. S. Pillai
- Starring: Sathyan; Kumari Thankam; Thomas Burleigh
- Music by: Vimalkumar
- Release date: 17 April 1953
- Country: India
- Language: Malayalam

Thiramala is a 1953 Malayalam-language film, directed by Vimalkumar and P.R.S. Pillai, starring Sathyan, Kumari Thankam, Thomas Burleigh, Ponathil Sivadas, Prabha . The film has a significant place in the history of Malayalam cinema. Filmmaker Ramu Kariat worked as an assistant director in this film. Hindustani vocalist Lakshmi Shankar recorded a song for this film.

The film was screened in various territories of the Keralam state with a different climax.

== Plot ==
The film was based on a short story Sholey, written by T. N. Gopinathan Nair, who also wrote the script and also acted in a major role in the film.

Lakshmi, daughter of the village landlord Kurup, and Venu, son of the ferryman Panikkar are childhood sweethearts. Their love blooms much against the wishes of Kurup. Kurup was successful in getting Lakshmi to marry Vijayan. Venu leaves his village and finds a waiter's job in a city hotel.

Vijayan leads an immoral life, making Lakshmi's life hell. Vijayan and Lakshmi come to stay in the hotel where Venu works. Venu had to remain a silent witness to the breakup of the marriage of Vijyan and Lakshmi.

Vijayan falls under the charm of a hotel dancer Swapna Latha. He eventually loses all his wealth. A repentant Vijayan leaves the city in search of Lakshmi. Venu, who had also returned to the village, meets Lakshmi in a trying circumstance. Waiting to be taken across the swollen river during a raging storm, Lakshmi is helped by Venu. Just when he sees Lakshmi safely to the other shore, Venu is thrown into the river and drowns.

The film was screened in various territories of the Kerala state with a different climax. In the Malabar region, the film had a happy ending with Lakshmi saved from the storm by Venu, who entrusts her to Vijayan. In the Southern region of the state, the film ends with a frame showing the dead body of Venu washing ashore.

== Cast ==
- Sathyan as Vijayan
- Kumari Thankam as Lakshmi
- Thomas Burleigh as Venu
- Miss Chandani
- Kumari Kalyani
- P. Bhaskaran as Panikkar
- Sasikumar
- T. N. Gopinathan Nair as Kurup
- Chandni (Old)
- T. N. K. J. Thomas
- T. S. Muthaiah
- Kumari Prabha (child artiste)
- Adoor Bhasi
- Baby Valsala
- Ponathil Sivadas
