= Ramu Kariat =

Indian film director

- Born: 1 February 1927; Engandiyur, Thrissur, Kerala, India
- Died: 10 February 1979 (aged 52); Thiruvananthapuram, Kerala, India
- Occupation: Film director
- Years active: 1954–1979
- Notable work: Chemmeen, Neelakuyil
- Relatives: Devan

Ramu Kariat (1 February 1927 – 10 February 1979) was an Indian film director for almost three decades from the 1950s to the 1970s, who directed a number of acclaimed films in the Malayalam cinema. His noted films include Neelakkuyil (1954), Minnaminungu (1957), Mudiyanaya Puthran (1961), Moodupadam (1963) and the National Award winning Chemmeen (1966).

== Career ==
He started his career through the Kerala People's Arts Club (K.P.A.C.), a leftist theatre group. He debuted in films by co-directing Thiramala (1953) with Vimal Kumar/P.R.S. Pillai and the path-breaking film Neelakkuyil in 1954 along with P. Bhaskaran. Neelakuyil was written by Uroob and starred Sathyan and Miss Kumari was a major commercial success. This film is considered as the first mature film in Malayalam due to the professional approach it had in direction, script, performances and music. Ramu Kariat's co-director of the film P. Bhaskaran and cameraman A. Vincent went on to have illustrious careers themselves.

After Neelakkuyil, he directed Minnaminungu (1957), another noted film. His next film was the film version of veteran playwright Thoppil Bhasi's play Mudiyanaya Puthran (1961). After directing Moodupadam (1963), he went on to direct Chemmeen (1965). Chemmeen is considered as the turning point in Malayalam cinema. The film, an adaptation of Thakazhi Sivashankara Pillai's novel in the same name was the first Malayalam film to win the National Film Award for Best Feature Film. The tragic love story starred Sathyan Madhu and Sheela.

In 1975 he was a member of the jury at the 9th Moscow International Film Festival.

He directed fifteen films during his career. He was elected as Member of Legislative Assembly from Nattika in 1965 as a left independent but could not serve in the Legislative Assembly because no one could form the Assembly since there was no majority for any party.

== Awards ==
National Film Awards

- 1954: All India Certificate of Merit for Best Feature Film – Neelakuyil
- 1954: President's Silver Medal for Best Feature Film in Malayalam - Neelakuyil
- 1961: President's Silver Medal for Best Feature Film in Malayalam - Mudiyanaya Puthran
- 1965: National Film Award for Best Feature Film – Chemmeen

== Filmography ==
- Neelakkuyil (1954)
- Bharata Natyam (1956)
- Minnam Minungu (1957)
- Mudiyanaya Puthran (1961)
- Moodupadam (1963)
- Chemmeen (1966)
- Ezhu Rathrikal (1968)
- Abhayam (1970)
- Maaya (1972)
- Nellu (1974)
- Dweepu (1976)
- Kondagali (1978)
- Ammuvinte Aattinkutty (1978)
- Sanghaganam(1979-Acting credit)
- Malankattu (1980)
