= K. Raghavan =

Indian musical artist

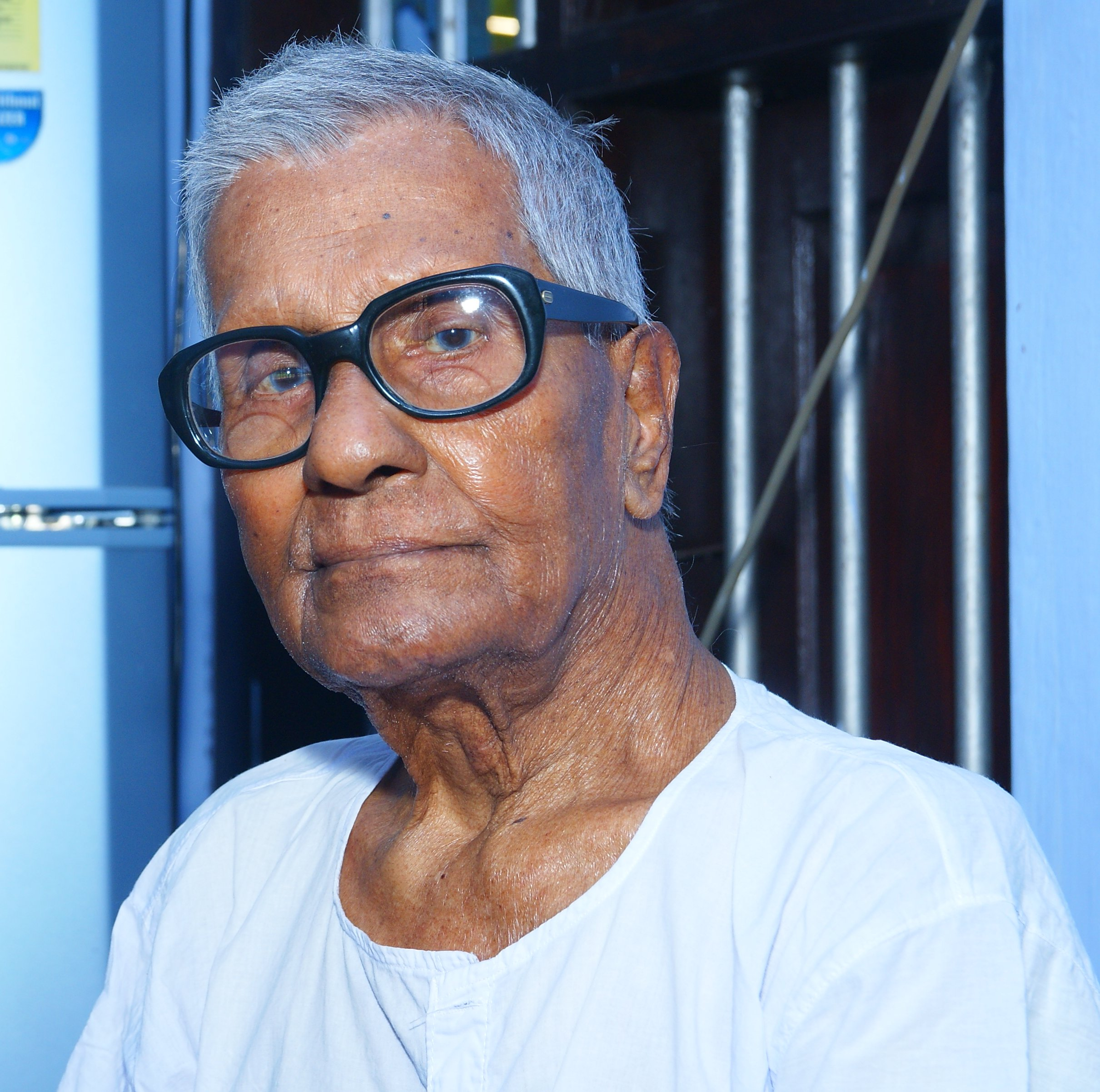

Background information
- Also known as: Raghavan Master
- Born: Krishnan Raghavan; 2 December 1913; Tellicherry, Malabar district, British India (present-day Thalassery, Kannur district, Kerala, India)
- Died: 19 October 2013 (aged 99) Thalassery, Kerala, India
- Genres: Indian classical, light music, mappila songs
- Occupations: Musician, composer
- Instruments: Tabla, keyboards, thambura, drums, vocals
- Years active: 1950 - 2013
- Label: Gramophone Company India

Krishnan Raghavan (2 December 1913 – 19 October 2013), also known as Raghavan Master, was an Indian music composer primarily known for his work in Malayalam cinema and as a carnatic vocalist. Along with G. Devarajan, V. Dakshinamoorthy and Baburaj, Raghavan is credited with contributing to the renaissance of Malayalam film music, pioneering the creation of Malayalam film songs with their own distinct tunes and styles. Before him, Malayalam film songs often imitated popular Hindi and Tamil film songs and old classical kritis. Raghavan helped establish a new direction and identity for Malayalam film music. He composed around 400 songs in Malayalam cinema over nearly four decades. In 1997, he was honored with the J. C. Daniel Award, the Government of Kerala's highest honor for contributions to Malayalam cinema.

== Early life ==
K. Raghavan was born in Tellicherry near Kannur in the erstwhile Madras Presidency (present-day Kerala) on 2 December 1913, to folk singer M. Krishnan and Narayani. He began studying classical music in his childhood and also played football. He began his professional career as a tambura player at All India Radio, Madras and in 1950, he was transferred to Calicut, where he became involved with film artists.

== Career ==
Raghavan initiated a new trend in Malayalam film music with the release of the 1954 movie Neelakuyil. Renowned lyricist and Raghavan's friend P. Bhaskaran penned the songs in the film. Neelakkuyil Raghavan also sang one of the songs.Neelakkuyil. The song Kayalarikathu valayerinjappol became an instant hit.

== Music career ==
During a career spanning over four decades, he scored music for more than sixty Malayalam films, and many of his compositions remain classics. Raghavan brought folk elements into Malayalam film music, and his melodies replaced the imitation of popular Hindi tunes that prevailed at the time. He also composed songs for plays by groups such as the Kerala People's Arts Club and All India Radio. Most of his songs were written by P. Bhaskaran, and he introduced many new voices to Malayalam film music, including K. J. Yesudas, P. Jayachandran, P.Susheela, Mehboob, K. P. Brahmanandan, M. Balamuralikrishna, M. L. Vasanthakumari, A. P. Komala, Gayathri Srikrishnan, Santha P. Nair, A. M. Rajah, K. P. Udayabhanu, M.G. Radhakrishnan, P. B. Sreenivas, Vani Jayaram, Jikki, V. T. Murali, M. G. Sreekumar, K. S. Chithra and Sujatha Mohan.

== As a musician ==
- First Movie Pullimaan (1951)
- Number of Movies 65
- Number of Songs 405
- State Awards 2

== Songs ==
- Kayalarikathu...
- Ellarum chollanu...
- Nazhiyuripalu kondu...
- Hrudaythin romancham...
- Ekantha Kaamuka Ninte Manoratham ...
- Shyamasundara pushpame...
- Aattinakkareyakkare...
- Poornendumukhiyodambalathil...
- Nalikerathinte nattilenikkoru...
- Manjani poonilavil...
- Kathu sookshichoru...
- Appozhe paranjille...
- Manathe Mazhamukil malakale...
- Anuragakkalariyil angathinu vannavale...
- Pambukalkku maalamundu... (KPAC drama song)
- Thalayku meethe... (KPAC drama song)

== Personal life ==
Raghavan was married to Yashoda and had five children: three daughters and two sons. He died at the age of 99 on 19 October 2013 in Thalassery. His younger brother, Lakshmanan, predeceased him.

== Awards ==
Civilian Awards by Govt. of India

- 2010 – Padma Shri

Kerala State Film Awards

- 1973 – Best Music Director for Nirmalyam
- 1977 – Best Music Director – Poojakedukkatha Pookkal.
- 1997 – J. C. Daniel Award from the Government of Kerala

Other awards

- 1981 – Kerala Sangeetha Nataka Akademi Fellowship
- 2000 – Best Lifetime Achievement Award
- 2006 – Swaralaya Yesudas Award
- 2011 – M. G. Radhakrishnan Award
