= List of Malayalam films of 1962 =

The following is a list of original and dubbed Malayalam films released in 1962.

Opening		Sl. no.	Film	Cast	Director	Music director	Notes
F E B	9	1	Laila Majnu	Prem Nazir, L. Vijayalakshmi	P. Bhaskaran	M. S. Baburaj	
F E B	23	2	Veluthambi Dalawa	Kottarakkara Sreedharan Nair, Ragini, Ambika	G. Viswanath	V. Dakshinamoorthy	
M A R	31	3	Snehadeepam	Thikkurissy Sukumaran Nair, Adoor Pankajam	P. Subramaniam	M. B. Sreenivasan	
A P R	13	4	Sreekovil	Sathyan, Thikkurissy Sukumaran Nair	P. A. Thomas, S. Ramanathan	V. Dakshinamoorthy	
A P R	14	5	Puthiya Akasam Puthiya Bhoomi	Sathyan, Vinodini, Ragini	M. S. Mani	M. B. Sreenivasan	Certificate of Merit for the Best Feature Film
S E P	7	6	Kalpadukal	Prem Nazir, Prem Nawas	K. S. Antony	M. B. Sreenivasan	Certificate of Merit for the Second Best Feature Film
S E P	11	7	Sreerama Pattabhishekam	Prem Nazir, Kaviyoor Ponnamma	G. K. Ramu	Br Lakshmanan	
S E P	28	8	Kannum Karalum	Sathyan, Kamal Haasan	K. S. Sethumadhavan	M. B. Sreenivasan	
O C T	5	9	Vidhi Thanna Vilakku	Sathyan, Ragini	S. S. Rajan	V. Dakshinamoorthy	
O C T	14	10	Palattu Koman	Sathyan, Ragini	Kunchacko	M. S. Baburaj	
O C T	26	11	Swargarajyam	T. R. Omana, T. S. Muthaiah	P. B. Unni	M. B. Sreenivasan	
N O V	16	12	Bhagyajathakam	Sathyan, Sheela	P. Bhaskaran	M. S. Baburaj	
D E C	1	13	Viyarppinte Vila	Sathyan, Adoor Bhasi, Ragini	M. Krishnan Nair	V. Dakshinamoorthy	
D E C	20	14	Bharya	Sathyan, Ragini	Kunchacko	G. Devarajan	

== Dubbed Films ==
Opening		Sl. no.	Film	Cast	Director	Music director	Basic Language	Notes
F E B	9	1	Shanthi Nivasam	Akkineni Nageswara Rao, Krishna Kumari	C. S. Rao	Ghantasala	Telugu	
