= List of Malayalam films of 1963 =

This a list of Malayalam films from India released in 1963.

Opening		Sl. no.	Film	Cast	Director	Music director	Notes
F E B	22	1	Ninamaninja Kalpadukal	Prem Nazir, Madhu	N. N. Pisharady	M. S. Baburaj	President's silver medal for Best Feature Film
F E B	22	2	Nithyakanyaka	Sathyan, Ragini	K. S. Sethumadhavan	G. Devarajan	
M A R	20	3	Doctor	Sathyan, Sheela	M. S. Mani	G. Devarajan	Certificate of Merit for the Second Best Feature Film
M A R	31	4	Snapaka Yohannan	Jose Prakash, Prem Nazir	P. Subramaniam	Br Lakshmanan	
A P R	12	5	Moodupadam	Sathyan, Nellikkodu Bhaskaran	Ramu Kariat	M. S. Baburaj	
A P R	14	6	Sathyabhama	Prem Nazir, Adoor Bhasi, Ambika	M. S. Mani	V. Dakshinamoorthy	
M A Y	10	7	Susheela	Prem Nazir, Sheela	K. S. Sethumadhavan	V. Dakshinamoorthy	
J U N	8	8	Kadalamma	Sathyan, Manavalan Joseph	Kunchacko	G. Devarajan	
A U G	31	9	Kaattumaina	J. Sasikumar, K. V. Shanthi	M. Krishnan Nair	Br Lakshmanan	
S E P	28	10	Chilamboli	Prem Nazir, Sukumari	G. K. Ramu	V. Dakshinamoorthy	
N O V	22	11	Ammaye Kaanaan	Sathyan, Madhu	P. Bhaskaran	K. Raghavan	
D E C	21	12	Rebecca	Sathyan, Manavalan Joseph	Kunchacko	K. Raghavan	
D E C	21	13	Kalayum Kaminiyum	Prem Nazir, Ragini	P. Subramaniam	M. B. Sreenivasan	Certificate of Merit for the Third Best Feature Film
