= List of Malayalam films of 1964 =

This a list of India's Malayalam films released in 1964.

Opening		Sl. no.	Film	Cast	Director	Music director	Notes
J A N	31	1	Thacholi Othenan	Sathyan, Ambika	S. S. Rajan	M. S. Baburaj	National Film Award for Best Feature Film
F E B	22	2	Kuttikkuppayam	Prem Nazir, Ambika	M. Krishnan Nair	M. S. Baburaj	
M A R	5	3	Anna	Sathyan, Ragini	K. S. Sethumadhavan	G. Devarajan	
M A R	20	4	Devaalayam	Prem Nazir, Ambika Sukumaran	N. S. Muthukumaran, Ramanathan	V. Dakshinamoorthy	
A P R	3	5	School Master	Thikkurissy Sukumaran Nair, Ragini	S. R. Puttanna	G. Devarajan	
A P R	10	6	Manavatty	Sathyan, Madhu	K. S. Sethumadhavan	G. Devarajan	
A P R	18	7	Atom Bomb	K. Balaji, Kaviyoor Ponnamma	P. Subramaniam	Br Lakshmanan	
A P R	M A Y	8	Oral Koodi Kallanayi	Prem Nazir, Sheela	P. A. Thomas	K. V. Job	
A U G	14	9	Karutha Kai	Prem Nazir, Sheela	M. Krishnan Nair	M. S. Baburaj	
A U G	21	10	Pazhassi Raja	Kottarakkara, Prem Nazir	Kunchako	R. K. Shekhar	
S E P	11	11	Sree Guruvayoorappan	Kaduvakulam Antony, Thikkurissi	S. Ramanathan	V. Dakshinamoorthy	
S E P	30	12	Aadyakiranangal	Sathyan, Madhu	P. Bhaskaran	K. Raghavan	
O C T	8	13	Omanakuttan	Sathyan, Sukumari	K. S. Sethumadhavan	G. Devarajan	
N O V	22	14	Bhargavi Nilayam	Prem Nazir, Madhu, Vijaya Nirmala	A. Vincent	M. S. Babu Raj	
N O V	23	15	Bharthavu	Sheela, Kaviyoor Ponnamma	M. Krishnan Nair	V. Dakshinamoorthy	
N O V	27	16	Kalanjukittiya Thankam	Sathyan, Ambika	S. R. Puttanna	G. Devarajan	
D E C	5	17	Aayisha	Prem Nazir, Sathyan	Kunchacko	R. K. Shekhar	
D E C	22	18	Kudumbini	Prem Nazir, Sheela	J. Sasikumar	L. P. R. Varma	
D E C	24	19	Althaara	Prem Nazir, Sheela	P. Subramaniam	M. B. Sreenivasan	
