= R. Velappan Nair =

Malayalam film director

- Born: 29 November 1907; Alappuzha, Kerala, India
- Occupation: Director
- Known for: Sthree, Aaryankavu Kollasangam

R. Velappan Nair was a former Malayalam film director, producer and cinematographer. His movie in 1969, Aaryankavu Kollasangam was a very new experiment in Indian cinema.

== Biography ==
Velappan Nair was born in an affluent, aristocratic family Illickal in Alappuzha on 29 November 1907. His passion for theatre brought his school education to an abrupt halt. He even joined a drama troupe from Tamil Nadu and went off with them without informing his family. This troupe travelled and reached Madras. He worked there in Syamala Film Studio as assistant director and also picked up the basics of cinematography.

In 1950, he directed his first Malayalam movie named Sthree story based on the drama with the same name of Thikkurissy Sukumaran Nair. And, he was also the cameraman of the film. After, Velappan Nair directed Yachakan in '51, Lokaneethi in '53, Kalam Marunnu in '55, Minnunnathellam Ponnalla in '57, Aaryankavu Kollasangam in'69.

== Filmography ==
- Sthree (1950)
- Yachakan (1951)
- Lokaneethi (1953)
- Kalam Marunnu (1955)
- Minnunnathellam Ponnalla (1957)
- Aaryankavu Kollasangam (1969)
