= Kadathukaran =

- Directed by: M. Krishnan Nair
- Written by: K. Padmanabhan Nair
- Screenplay by: K. Padmanabhan Nair
- Produced by: A. K. Balasubrahmaniam
- Starring: Sathyan; Ambika; Adoor Bhasi; Hari
- Cinematography: W. R. Subba Rao
- Edited by: K. D. George
- Music by: M. S. Baburaj
- Production company: Saravanabhava Pictures
- Distributed by: Saravanabhava Pictures
- Release date: 12 March 1965
- Country: India
- Language: Malayalam

Kadathukaran (transl. Boatman) is a 1965 Indian Malayalam film, directed by M. Krishnan Nair and produced by A. K. Balasubrahmaniam. The film stars Sathyan, Sheela, Adoor Bhasi and Hari in the lead roles. The film had musical score by M. S. Baburaj.

== Cast ==
- Sathyan as Ramu
- Sheela as Madhuri
- Adoor Bhasi as Kala Velu
- Hari as Chandran
- Prem Nawas as SI Mukundan
- Adoor Pankajam as Naaniyamma
- Ambika as Thankamma
- Baby Vinodini as Leela
- G. K. Pillai as Rajan
- Haji Abdul Rahman as Chandi
- Kottayam Chellappan as DYSP Ramadas
- Paravoor Bharathan as Bhadran
- Sujatha as Kadambari
- Suprabha as Chandrika

== Soundtrack ==
The music was composed by M. S. Baburaj and the lyrics were written by Vayalar Ramavarma.

No.	Song	Singers	Lyrics	Length (m:ss)
1	"Ambaadi Thannilorunni"	Latha Raju	Vayalar Ramavarma	
2	"Kallachiriyaanu"	S. Janaki	Vayalar Ramavarma	
3	"Kannuneer Kadalithu"	K. J. Yesudas	Vayalar Ramavarma	
4	"Kokkarakko"	K. J. Yesudas	Vayalar Ramavarma	
5	"Manimukile"	S. Janaki, A. K. Sukumaran	Vayalar Ramavarma	
6	"Mutholakkudayumaay"	P. Leela	Vayalar Ramavarma	
7	"Paavakkutti"	K. P. Udayabhanu, Latha Raju	Vayalar Ramavarma	
8	"Rajahamsame"	L. R. Eeswari	Vayalar Ramavarma	
9	"Thrikkaarthikaykku"	P. Leela, K. P. Udayabhanu	Vayalar Ramavarma	
