= Rosie (1965 film) =

- Directed by: P. N. Menon
- Written by: P. J. Antony
- Screenplay by: P. J. Antony
- Produced by: Mani Swami
- Starring: Prem Nazir; Kaviyoor Ponnamma; Thikkurissy Sukumaran Nair; P. J. Antony
- Cinematography: E. N. Balakrishnan
- Edited by: M. S. Mani; G. Venkittaraman
- Music by: K. V. Job
- Production company: Vrindavan Pictures
- Distributed by: Vrindavan Pictures
- Release date: 4 June 1965
- Country: India
- Language: Malayalam

Rosie, also known as Rosy, is a 1965 Indian Malayalam-language film, directed by P. N. Menon and produced by Mani Swami. The film stars Prem Nazir, Kaviyoor Ponnamma, Thikkurissy Sukumaran Nair and P. J. Antony and features a musical score by K. V. Job. Rosie was one of the first Malayalam films to be shot completely outdoors.

== Cast ==
- Prem Nazir
- Kaviyoor Ponnamma
- Thikkurissy Sukumaran Nair
- P. J. Antony
- T. S. Muthaiah
- D. K. Chellappan
- Vijayanirmala

== Soundtrack ==
The music was composed by K. V. Job and the lyrics were written by P. Bhaskaran.

| No. | Song | Singers | Lyrics | Length (m:ss) |
|---|---|---|---|---|
| 1 | "Alliyaambal" | K. J. Yesudas | P. Bhaskaran | |
| 2 | "Chaalakkudippuzhayum" | L. R. Eeswari | P. Bhaskaran | |
| 3 | "Enkilo Pandoru" | P. Leela | P. Bhaskaran | |
| 4 | "Kannilenthaanu" | L. R. Eeswari, K. P. Udayabhanu | P. Bhaskaran | |
| 5 | "Velukkumbam Puzhayoru" | K. J. Yesudas | P. Bhaskaran | |
