= Adoor Pankajam =

Indian actress

- Born: 1925; Adoor, Travancore
- Died: 26 June 2010 (aged 84–85); Adoor, Kerala, India
- Occupation: Actress
- Years active: 1937–2006
- Spouse: Devarajan Potti
- Children: Ajayan
- Parent(s): K. Raman Pilla, Kunjukunjamma

Adoor Pankajam (1925 – 26 June 2010) was an Indian actress, in Malayalam movies. She hailed from Adoor in Pathanamthitta district of Kerala state. Mainly, she was a supporting actress and a comedian. Her sister Adoor Bhavani was also a Malayalam cinema actress.

Pankajam's most noted performance was in the national award winning film Chemmeen as "Nalla Pennu". She also did a pivotal role in India's first neo-realistic film Newspaper Boy (1955). In 2008, Kerala Sangeetha Nataka Academy honoured Pankajam and Bhavani for their overall contributions to theatre and drama.

Pankajam died at the age of 85 on 26 June 2010.

== Personal life ==
Adoor Pankajam was born to Adoor Paarappurathu Kunjuraman Pillai and Kunjoonjamma in 1925 and was the second of their 8 children. Her sister Adoor Bhavani also became famous later through plays and movies.

She could only study till 4th standard due to financial difficulties. But still she continued her music studies under Pandalam Krishnapillai Bhagavathar till the age of 11. By this time, she had done musical kacheri in most of the temples around her village.

At 12, she started acting in Kannur Kerala Kalanilayam troupe against the will of her parents. She acted in their play Madhumadhurayam on over 300 stages. Her next play was Rakthabhandham by a theater in Chengannoor. In this play, she did a comic role which was widely accepted.

She met Devarajan Potti, the owner of Kollam Bharatha Kalachandrika, while she was working with this troupe and later married him. Potti later started another troupe called Parthasarathy Theaters and during her tenure with this troupe, she got an invitation to act in movies.

She has a son named Ajayan, who is a cinema/TV serial actor.

== Career ==
She started her acting career with the stage play Madhu Madhuryam by Kalanilayam Theaters. The first movie she was cast in was Premalekhanam, produced by Pappa Soman. But her first movie which got released was Vishappinte Vila, directed by Boban Kunchacko. Her last movie was the Dileep-starrer Kunjikoonan. She acted in over 400 films during her career.

In 1976, she and her sister Adoor Bhavani started a theater troupe called Adoor Jaya Theaters. Later the sisters split up and Bhavani left the Theater. Pankajam went on with the troupe with her husband Devarajan Potti and kept the Theater active for over 18 years.

In 2008, Kerala Sangeetha Nataka Academy honoured Pankajam and Bhavani for their overall contributions to theatre and drama. She has also received the Kerala State Film Award for Second Best Actress for her performance in the movie Sabarimala Ayyappan.

== Filmography ==
=== 1950s ===
Year	Title	Role	Notes
1952	Achan	Pankajam	
1952	Premalekha	Devaki	
1952	Vishappinte Vili	Madhavi	
1953	Ponkathir	Janu	
1953	Sheriyo Thetto	Paru	
1954	Balyasakhi	Gouri	
1954	Avakashi	Sheelavathi	
1954	Avan Varunnu	Madhaviyamma	
1955	CID	Panki	
1955	Kidappadam	Rishakkaran's wife	
1955	Harishchandra	Kalakanta's wife	
1955	Newspaper Boy	Lakshmi Amma	
1956	Avar Unarunnu	Nani	
1956	Manthravadi	Mayavathi	
1956	Koodappirappu		
1957	Deva Sundari		
1957	Padatha Painkili	Theyi	
1957	Minnunnathellam Ponnalla	Kalyani	
1958	Randidangazhi		
1959	Chathurangam		
1959	Nadodikal	Janu	

=== 1960s ===
Year	Title	Role	Notes
1961	Sabarimala Ayyappan	Parvathi	
1961	Christmas Rathri	Mariya	
1961	Jnaanasundari	Kathri	
1961	Bhakta Kuchela	Kamakshi	
1962	Sreerama Pattabhishekam	Mandara	
1962	Bharya	Rahel	
1962	Kannum Karalum	Parukuttiyamma	
1962	Kaalpadukal		
1962	Bhagyajathakam	Servant	
1962	Snehadeepam	Kochu Narayani/Naani	
1963	Susheela		
1963	Nithyakanyaka		
1963	Kadalamma	Kaliyamma	
1963	Kalayum Kaminiyum	Panki	
1963	Doctor	Thankamma	
1963	Sathyabhama	Harini	
1963	Snapaka Yohannan	Rahael	
1963	Chilamboli	Parijatham	
1964	Kalaju Kittiya Thankam	Pankajam	
1964	Bharthavu	Seetha	
1964	Anna		
1964	Manavatti	Kalyani	
1964	Karutha Kai	Maheswari	
1964	Omanakuttan	Pankajakshi	
1964	Atom Bomb	Kalyanikutty	
1964	Aayisha	Beeyathu	
1964	Adyakiranagal	Kunjeli	
1965	Shakuntala		
1965	Kattuppokkal	Sharada	
1965	Kattuthulasi	Kamalamma	
1965	Kochumon	Maathu	
1965	Odayil Ninnu	Sara	
1965	Devatha	Pankajakshiyamma	
1965	Inapravukal	Mariya	
1965	Kadathukaran	Naaniyamma	
1965	Muthalali		
1965	Thommante Makkal	Marykutty's mother	
1966	Chemmeen	Nalla Pennu	
1966	Jail	Shankari	
1967	Ollathumathi		
1967	Kavalam Chundan		
1967	Mainatharuvi Kolacase	Orotha	
1968	Thirichadi	Ammukutti	
1968	Ragini		
1968	Kodugalooramma	Konkimaami	
1968	Punnapra Vayalar	PK Vilasiniyamma	
1969	Kumara Sambhavam	Vasumathi	
1969	Jwala	Panki	
1969	Koottukudumbam	Shankari	
1969	Soosi	Achamma	
1969	Urangatha Sundari	Madhavi	

=== 1970s ===
Year	Title	Role	Notes
1970	Pearl View	Rathi Madhavan	
1970	Ningalenne Communistakki	Kamalamma	
1970	Thara	Hostel Warden	
1970	Othenante Makan	Uppatti	
1970	Dathuputhran	Achamma	
1971	Agnimrigam	Karthyayini	
1971	Panchavan Kaadu	Nangeli	
1971	Karakanakadal	Thoma's mother	
1971	Bobanum Moliyum		
1971	Lora Nee Evide		
1972	Sree Guruvayoorappan		
1972	Oru Sundariyude Kadha	Paachiyakka	
1972	Gandharavakshetram	Lilly	
1972	Postmane Kananilla		
1972	Prathikaram	Kamalam	
1972	Aromalunni	Nanipennu	
1972	Adyathe Kadha		
1973	Enippadikal		
1973	Thottavadi	Kamalamma	
1973	Chayam		
1973	Panitheeratha Veedu	Rosi	
1973	Yamini	Dakshyayani	
1973	Pavangal Pennungal		
1973	Thenaruvi	Kotha	
1973	Ponnapuram Kotta	Kochukumma	
1973	Swargaputhri	Mariyakutty	
1973	Rakkuyil	Madhavi	
1974	Thumbolarcha	Ponni	
1974	Durga	Yashodha	
1974	Youvanam	Rajan's girlfriend	
1974	Devi Kanyakumari	Kamalakshi	
1974	Vandikkari		
1975	Cheenavala	Karthyayani	
1975	Swarnamalsyam		
1975	Priyamulla Sophia		
1975	Dharma Kshethra Kurukshethra		
1975	Manishada	Sathyabhama	
1975	Nathoon		
1975	Neela Sari		
1975	Neela Ponman	Akkomma	
1976	Yakshaganam	Naaniyamma	
1976	Mallanum Mathevanum		
1976	Chennay Valarthiya Kutti	Padmakshi	
1977	Achaaram Ammini Osharam Omana	Kalyani	
1977	Kannappanunni	Kamakshi	
1977	Kodiyettam	Pankajakshi	
1977	Choondakkari		
1978	Vadakakkoru Hridayam	Karthyayani	
1978	Padakuthira		
1978	Aaru Mankikkoor		
1978	Kadathanattu Makkam		
1978	Chakrayudam		
1979	Edavazhiyile Poocha Minda Poocha	Kunjikkaliyamma	
1979	Rajaveedhi		

=== 1980s ===
Year	Title	Role	Notes
1980	Theekadal	Karthyayani	
1980	Ammayum Makalum	Brahannala	
1980	Paalattu Kunjikannan		
1981	Vaadaka Veettile Athidhi		
1981	Arikkari Ammu		
1987	Anantaram	Lakshmi Amma	
1988	Oohakachavadam		
1988	Kandathum Kettathum		
1989	Aattinakkare		
1989	Najangalude Kochu Doctor	Nurse	
1989	Swagatham	Mrs. Pillai	

=== 1990s ===
Year	Title	Role	Notes
1990	Lal Salam		
1990	Aye Auto	Pankachi	
1991	Neelagiri	Muthiyamma	
1991	Maydinam	Mariya	
1991	Perumthachan	Unnimya Valiyamma	
1992	Kudumbasametham		
1992	Aham	Mariyamma	
1993	Varam Tharum Vadivelan	Devi	Tamil film
1995	Vrudhanmare Sookshikkuka	Kusumavalli	
1995	Alanchery Thambrakkal	Kettilamma	
1995	Arabikadaloram	Hassan's mother	
1995	Kathapurushan		
1995	Thumbolikadappuram	Kakkamma	
1995	Achan Rajavu Appan Jethavu	Mariyamma	
1995	Three Men Army	Indira Devi's mother	
1996	Mayooranritham	Bhavaniyamma	
1996	Harbour	Plamena Ammachi	
1997	Adukkala Rahasyam Angaadi Paattu	Karimeli	
1998	Thattakam	Meenakshi Thalla	
1998	Kudumba Vaarthakal	Meera's mother	

=== 2000s ===
Year	Title	Role	Notes
2001	Soothradharan	Rameshan's grandmother	
2001	Snehapoorvam Anna		
2002	Kunjikoonan		
2002	Adheena		
2003	Margam		
2004	Snehapoorvam		
2006	Ammathottil		

=== 2010s ===
Year	Title	Role	Notes
2014	Tharangal		Archive footage

== Dramas ==
- Parithranayam
- Pamsula
- Homam
- Rangapooja
- Paashupathrasthram
- Madhumadhurayam
- Rakthabhandham
- Kalyanachitti

== TV Serial ==
- Parinamam
