= Vinodini Sasimohan =

Indian actress

Vinodini Sasimohan is the Chief Administrative Officer of Viswa Kala Kendra, Thiruvananthapuram, India. She was a child artist in Malayalam cinema. Her role as Goddess Devi Kanya Kumari in the film Devi Kanyakumari was noteworthy.

She is the last child of Guru Gopinath, the famous Indian classical dancer. She is married to T. SasiMohan, a senior journalist and presently the Editor, Communications Department, Santhigiri Ashram. Viswa Kala Kendra is an art institution founded by Guru Gopinath to impart training in Kerala Natanam, Kathakali and Ottamthullal.

Vinodini, then popular as Baby Vinodini, acted in 17 Malayalam films in the 1960s with leading actors like Sathyan, Prem Nazir, Thikkurissy, Ambika, Miss Kumari, Ragini, Jose Prakash, Aranmula Ponnamma, K. R. Vijaya and others.

== Selected filmography ==
- Kannum Karalum (double role)
- Ammaye Kaanaan (1963) as Suhasini
- Chilampoli
- Bhaktha Kuchela(1961) as Young Krishna
- Guruvayoorappan as Guruvayoorappan/Unnikrishnan
- Bharthav
- Snehadeepam as Usha
- Puthiya Akaasam Puthiya Bhoomi
- Kadalamma as little princess
- Omanakkuttan
- Karuthakai
- Kaliyodam
- Kadaththukaran (1965) as Leela
- Manavatti as Joy mon- Boy's role
- Devi Kanyakumari (lead role as Devi)
- Swami Ayyappan

In Kannum Karalum she acted in dual role with Kamal Haasan, who went on to become a leading actor in Indian cinema.
