= Puthiya Akasam Puthiya Bhoomi =

- VCD cover
- Directed by: M. S. Mani
- Written by: Thoppil Bhasi
- Based on: Puthiya Akasam Puthiya Bhoomi by Thoppil Bhasi
- Produced by: T. E. Vasudevan
- Starring: Sathyan; T. S. Muthaiah; B. S. Saroja; Bahadoor
- Cinematography: U. Rajagopal
- Edited by: M. S. Mani
- Music by: M. B. Sreenivasan
- Production company: Jaya Maruthi
- Release date: 14 April 1962
- Country: India
- Language: Malayalam

Puthiya Akasam Puthiya Bhoomi (transl. New Sky, New Earth) is a 1962 Malayalam-language film, directed by M. S. Mani, starring Sathyan and Vinodini. It is based on Thoppil Bhasi's play of the same name that was first staged in 1959. The film received a certificate of merit at the Indian National Film Awards.

== Plot ==
A major government dam project threatens to flood fertile village land. Wealthy estate owners bribe the senior engineer to illegally lower the dam's height to protect their private properties. Sukumaran, an honest junior engineer, discovers the scheme and stands up against the powerful lobby to protect the nation's interests. The conflict ends in tragedy when a bomb planted by the corrupt plotters detonates, killing Sukumaran and the workers at the construction site.

== Cast ==
- Sathyan as Sukumaran
- Kottarakkara Sreedharan Nair as Jhonson
- Ragini as Ponnamma
- B. S. Saroja as Usha
- S. P. Pillai as Mammootty
- T. S. Muthaiah as Shankarankutty Nair
- Kottayam Chellappan as Usha's Father
- Bahadoor as Gopakumar
- Santo Krishnan as Kunju Nair
- Adoor Bhavani
- Baby Vinodini
- Gopinath
- P. K. Leela

== Soundtrack ==
The music was composed by M. B. Sreenivasan and lyrics were written by P. Bhaskaran.

Song	Singers
"Aasha Than Poonthen"	K. Jamuna Rani
"Ambarathil" (Bit)	P. Leela
"Maadathin Makkale"	K. J. Yesudas, P. Leela, Chorus, K. P. Udayabhanu, K. S. George
"Murali Mohana Krishna"	P. Leela, Kaviyoor C. K. Revamma
"Neram Poy"	Chorus, K. S. George
"Nilkkeda Nilkkeda"	K. S. George, Mehboob
"Oru Kai Oru Kai"	Chorus, K. S. George
"Pandu Pandu Nammude"	Mehboob
"Premathin Naattukaariyaanu Njaan"	P. Susheela
"Thaamarathumpee Vaa Vaa"	P. Leela, K. P. Udayabhanu

== Accolades ==
National Film Awards

- 1962: Certificate of Merit for the Best Feature Film in Malayalam
