= Aalinganam =

- Poster
- Directed by: I. V. Sasi
- Written by: Sherif
- Produced by: M. Ramachandran
- Starring: Raghavan; Sridevi; Rani Chandra; Vincent
- Cinematography: Vipin Das
- Edited by: K. Narayanan
- Music by: A. T. Ummer
- Production company: Murali Movies
- Release date: 26 November 1976
- Country: India
- Language: Malayalam

Aalinganam (transl. Embrace) is a 1976 Indian Malayalam-language film, directed by I. V. Sasi and written by Sherif. The film stars Raghavan, Sridevi, Rani Chandra and Vincent, with music by A. T. Ummer. Sasi remade it in Tamil as Pagalil Oru Iravu (1979), with Sridevi reprising her role. Vipin Das won the Kerala State Award for Best Black & White Cinematography for Aalinganam, Manimuzhakkam, and Choondakkari.

== Cast ==
- Raghavan as Ramesh
- Sridevi as Bindu
- Rani Chandra as Dr. Raji
- Vincent as Vinod
- Paul Vengola
- Prathapachandran
- Bahadoor as Rajashekharan
- K. P. Ummer as Dr. Gopinath
- Kuthiravattam Pappu as Neelambaran
- Leela Namboothiri
- Meena as Sharadamma
- Ragini as Vimala
- Vanchiyoor Radha

== Soundtrack ==
The music was composed by A. T. Ummer and the lyrics were written by Bichu Thirumala. The song "Thushaarabindukkale" was written by Bichu Thirumala for his play Dandakaranyam, and included in Aalinganam because Sasi liked it; though Kannur Rajan composed that song, he was not credited for it.

Song	Singers
"Chandana Gandhikal"	K. J. Yesudas
"Hemantham Thozhuthunarum"	K. J. Yesudas, Chorus
"Nimishadalangal"	K. J. Yesudas
"Thushaarabindukkale"	S. Janaki

== Accolades ==
At the Kerala State Film Awards, Ummer won the award for Best Music Director, and Janaki won for Best Female Playback Singer.
