= Kalaikkal Kumaran =

Indian actor

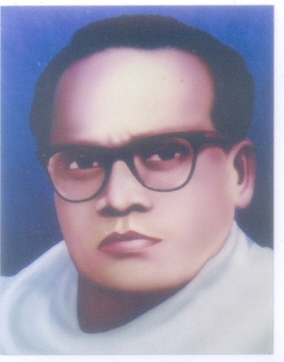
- Born: Kumaran; 1919; Vaikom, Kottayam, Kerala
- Died: 8 August 1998 (aged 78–79)
- Other name: Kalaikkan
- Occupations: Observational comedy, Sketch comedy, Wit/Word play, activist, freedom fighter
- Spouse: Bhargavi
- Children: 6 (1 deceased)
- Awards: Kerala state film award for contribution to film industry in 1997; Kerala Sangeetha Nataka Akademi Fellowship for acting in 1989

Kalaikkal Kumaran (1919 – 8 August 1998) was a noted Malayalam film and drama actor. He was well known for his comedy roles in dramas by Kalidasa Kalakendram. He acted in 65 films and more than 150 dramas. He appeared more than 15000 stages. His first drama was Kathirukanakili by Kerala theatre of Ponkunnam Varkey. Other famous dramas are Doctor, Kathirukanakili, Althara, Muthuchippi, Kadalpalam, Swantham Lekhakan, Yudhabhoomi and Samgamam, more than 150 dramas. He received many Kerala state awards, including Kerala Sangeetha Nataka Akademi Fellowship for acting in 1989. Kumaran was a member of Kerala Sangeetha Nataka Akademi. Kalaikkal Kumaran was supposed to create a record for appearing on more than 20,000 stages, but he lost his vision due to cataracts and left the field. Kalaikkal Kumaran was a staunch atheist throughout his life, and was a supporter of Communist Party of India.

== Movies ==
- Rakthabandham (1951)
- Viyarppinte Vila (1962)
- Kerala Kesari (1951)
- Lokaneethi (1953)
- Avan Varunnu (1954)
- Kidappaadam (1955)
- Achanum Makanum (1957)
- Arappavan (1961)
- Kalayum Kaaminiyum (1963)
- Bhoomiyile Maalakha (1965)
- Odayil Ninnu (1965)
- Kaattu Pookkal (1965)
- Shakunthala (1965)
- Punnapra Vayalar (1968)
- Kodungallooramma (1968)
- Chattambi Kavala (1969)
- Postmane Kanmanilla (1972)
- Nithyavasantham (1979)

He concentrated more on dramas of Kalidasa kalakendram.

== Awards ==
Kumaran received many awards, including:

- Kerala Sangeetha Nataka Akademi Award in 1978
- Kerala Sangeetha Nataka Akademi Fellowship in 1989
- Kerala state award for contribution to drama in 1993
- Kerala state film award for contribution to film industry in 1997

== Personal life ==
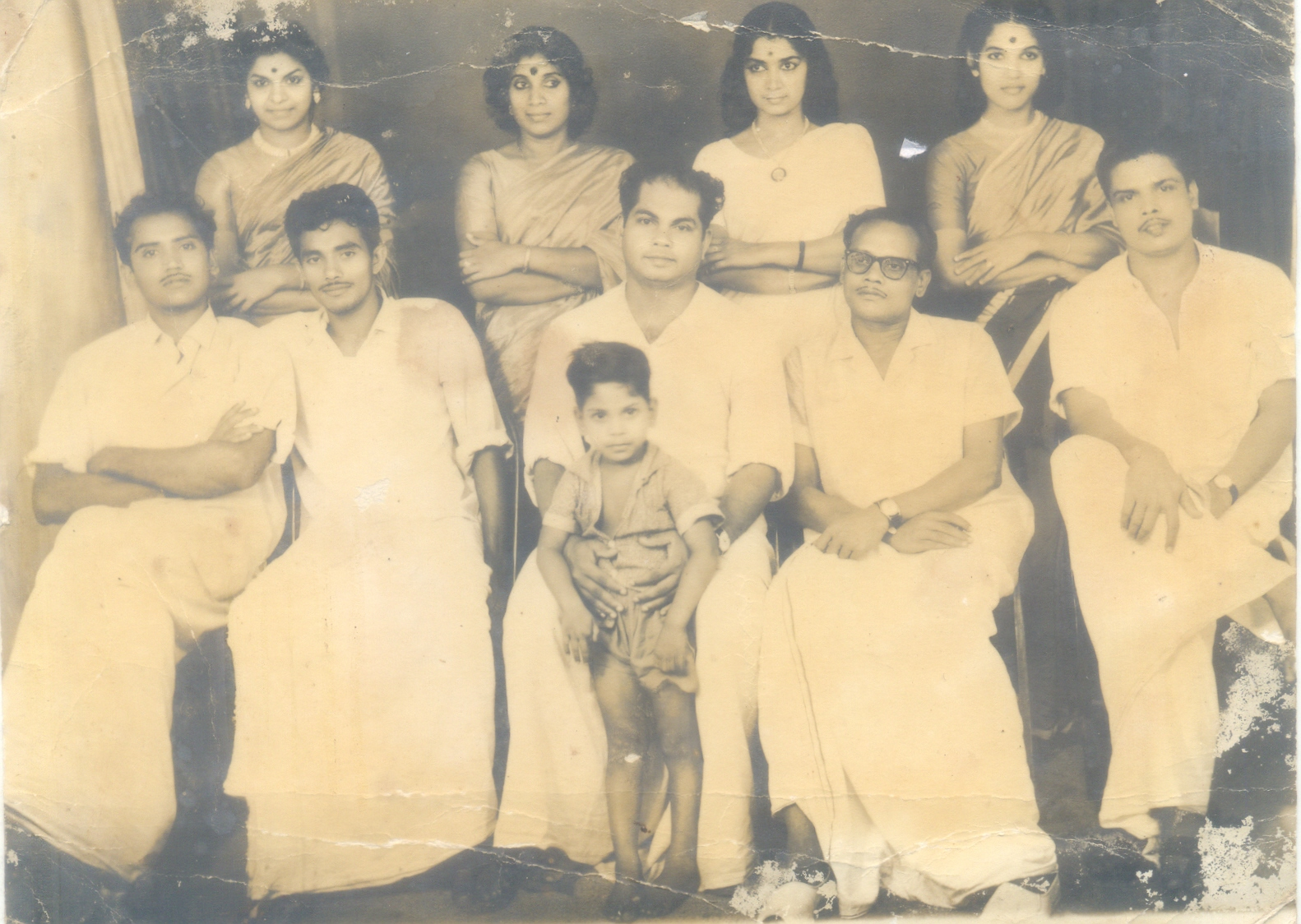

With his wife, Kumaran had six children. He died on August 8, 1998.

== See also ==
- Odayil Ninnu
