= Ammaye Kaanaan =

- Directed by: P. Bhaskaran
- Written by: E. M. Kovoor
- Screenplay by: E. M. Kovoor
- Produced by: V. Abdulla
- Starring: Sathyan; Ambika; Baby Vinodini; Vasanthi
- Cinematography: U. Rajagopal
- Edited by: G. Venkittaraman
- Music by: K. Raghavan
- Production company: Chithra Sagar
- Distributed by: Chithra Sagar
- Release date: 22 November 1963
- Country: India
- Language: Malayalam

Ammaye Kaanaan (transl. To Visit Mother) is a 1963 Indian Malayalam-language film, directed by P. Bhaskaran and produced by V. Abdulla. The film stars Sathyan, Ambika and Baby Vinodini.

== Cast ==
- Sathyan as Chandran
- Madhu as Balagopal
- Ambika Sukumaran as Madhavi
- Adoor Bhasi as Sangameshwara Iyer
- Jose Prakash as Prosecutor
- Kottayam Santha as Janaki Amma
- P. J. Antony as Sukumaran Nair
- Vasanthi as Rema
- Baby Vinodini as Suhasini
- Bahadoor as Nanu
- C. R. Lakshmi as Parvathi Amma
- J. A. R. Anand
- KPAC Leela as Leela
- Kedamangalam Ali as Vareed
- Kottayam Chellappan as Barrister Panicker
- Kunjandi as Kuttaayi
- Kuthiravattam Pappu as Pamman
- M. G. Menon
- S. P. Pillai as Sankunni Nair
- Ramesh

Plot

After completing his BL exams, Chandran traveled to a bungalow nestled in a picturesque valley in central Kerala for his vacation. While staying at the bungalow, Chandran encountered an exceptionally lovely young woman. According to Varith, the bungalow's caretaker, she was Madhavi, the daughter of the boatman Kutai.Madhavi encountered Chandran, and their initial acquaintance blossomed into a deep love over time. Eventually, they found themselves alone one day, where the inevitable occurred. Barrister Panicker arrived at the scene to send his son to London for the bar exam.Before his departure, Chandran left the location accompanied by his father after entrusting Veereth with a note to pass on to Madhavi. Upon Madhavi's arrival to meet Chandran, she discovered an abandoned bungalow. Pregnant and distressed, Madhavi confided in her father, Kutai. Overwhelmed by the shame and sorrow, Kutai succumbed to a broken heart.Madhavi, previously targeted by the locals, decided to leave the country after giving birth to a baby girl. She left her daughter in front of an orphanage before fleeing and seeking refuge, hoping for her child's well-being. Madhavi, on the verge of death, was rescued by a woman named Parvathiamma.Years went by and Chandran, now a sessions judge, attended the anniversary celebration of the orphanage. During the event, a girl named Suhasini caught Chandran's attention. Upon further exploration, he discovered that she was Madhavi's daughter, and also his own blood.Chandran took Suhasini with the permission of the orphanage authorities. At the insistence of the child, Rama was appointed as Suhasini's tuition mistress. Rama revealed her love for Chandran on this occasion. When Chandran informed Rema that he considered  her only as a sister and that she could never surpass Madhavi in his heart.On her death bed, Parvathiyamma entrusted Rema the protection of Madhavi. Without knowing she is lover of Chandran, she agreed . Rema's  brother Sukumaran Nair, is known for his alcohol abuse and disruptive behavior.Mesmerized by Madhavi's beauty, Sukumaran Nair captured her one night. Upon hearing Madhavi's screams, people find her standing with a bloody knife in her hand. Arrested for murder, Madhavi was brought before Judge Chandran for questioning. After going to jail and realizing that Madhavi was innocent and Rama was an eyewitness, Chandran transferred the case to another court. He begged Rama to save Madhavi. She did not agree . But upon the request of Suhasini, she finally revealed the truth in the court . And the family of Chnadran united

== Soundtrack ==
All lyrics are written by P. Bhaskaran except where noted; all music is composed by K. Raghavan except the Background Music was composed by M. B. Sreenivasan.

No.	Title	Lyrics	Artist(s)	Length
1.	"Daivame"	Pandalam Kerala Varma	A. P. Komala
2.	"Gokkale Mechu"		P. Leela
3.	"Kadhakadhappainkiliyum"		P. Leela
4.	"Konnappoove"		S. Janaki
5.	"Koodu Vittaallo" (Bit)
6.	"Madhurappathinezhukaari"		K. J. Yesudas
7.	"Parithraanaaya Sadhoonaam" (Bit)
8.	"Pennaayi Pirannenkil"		K. P. Udayabhanu
9.	"Praanante Praananil"		P. Leela
10.	"Udukku Paattu"		Choir
11.	"Unarunaroo Unnipoove"		S. Janaki
