= Devi Kanyakumari (film) =

- Directed by: P. Subramaniam
- Written by: Neela; Nagavally R. S. Kurup (dialogues)
- Screenplay by: Nagavally R. S. Kurup
- Produced by: P. Subramaniam
- Starring: Baby Vinodini; Kaviyoor Ponnamma; Rajasree; Thikkurissy Sukumaran Nair; Kedamangalam Sadanandan
- Cinematography: U. Rajagopal
- Edited by: N. Gopalakrishnan
- Music by: G. Devarajan
- Production company: Neela Productions
- Release date: 30 August 1974
- Country: India
- Language: Malayalam

Devi Kanyakumari is a 1974 Indian Malayalam-language Hindu devotional and mythological drama film, directed and produced by P. Subramaniam. The film stars Baby Vinodini, Kaviyoor Ponnamma, Thikkurissy Sukumaran Nair and Kedamangalam Sadanandan. It was released on 30 August 1974.

== Cast ==
- Baby Vinodini as Devi Kanyakumari
- Kaviyoor Ponnamma as Old Woman
- Thikkurissy Sukumaran Nair as Kamsan
- Kedamangalam Sadanandan
- Prema as Padmavathi
- Mohanan Kutty Krishnan as Omana's child's kidnapper
- Shubha
- Raghavan as Omana's Husband
- Unnimary as Kumari
- Adoor Bhavani as Uma
- Adoor Pankajam as Kamalakshi
- Anandavally
- Aranmula Ponnamma as Thankamma Chechi
- Gemini Ganesan as Vasudevan
- Rajasree as Devaki
- Kanta Rao as Mahavishnu
- Kottarakkara Sreedharan Nair as Padmavathi's Husband
- Manju Bhargavi as Kaali
- N. Govindankutty as Arcot Nawab
- P. K. Abraham as Banasuran
- Rani Chandra as Omana
- S. P. Pillai as Villuppaattu Singer Dasan Pillai
- K. V. Shanthi
- T. K. Balachandran as Naradan

== Soundtrack ==
The music was composed by G. Devarajan and the lyrics were written by Vayalar Ramavarma and Ashwathy Thirunaal, Swami Vivekananda. The soundtrack also includes traditional music.

Song	Singers	Lyrics
"Are Duraachaara" (Bit)		
"Devi Kanyakumaari"	K. J. Yesudas, Chorus	Vayalar Ramavarma
"Jagadeeshwari Jayajagadeeshwari"	P. Jayachandran, P. Madhuri, Selma George	Vayalar Ramavarma
"Jagadeeshwari Jayajagadeeshwari" (F)	Selma George	Vayalar Ramavarma
"KaaTwam Shubhe"	K. J. Yesudas	Ashwathy Thirunaal, Swami Vivekananda
"Kannaa Aalilakkanna"	P. Madhuri	Vayalar Ramavarma
"Madhuchashakam"	L. R. Eeswari	Vayalar Ramavarma
"Neelaambujaakshimaare"	P. Susheela, Chorus	Vayalar Ramavarma
"Shakthimayam Shiva Shakthimayam"	K. J. Yesudas	Vayalar Ramavarma
"Shucheendranaadhaa"	P. Madhuri	Vayalar Ramavarma
"Sree Bhagavathi"	P. B. Sreenivas	Vayalar Ramavarma
