= Choondakkari =

- Directed by: P. Vijayan
- Written by: Salam Karassery
- Screenplay by: Salam Karassery
- Produced by: Santhoshkumar
- Starring: Adoor Bhasi; Chakkittayil Udayakumar; Anupama; Vijayaraj; Abutty
- Cinematography: Vipin Das
- Edited by: G. Kalyana Sundaram
- Music by: Kannur Rajan
- Production company: Sankalpa
- Distributed by: Sankalpa
- Release date: 26 May 1977
- Country: India
- Language: Malayalam

Choondakkari is a 1977 Indian Malayalam film directed by P. Vijayan and produced by Santhoshkumar. The film stars Adoor Bhasi, Anupama, Vijayaraj and Abutty in the lead roles. The film has musical score by Kannur Rajan. Vipin Das won the Kerala state award for best black & white cinematography for Choondakkari, Manimuzhakkam, and Aalinganam.

== Cast ==
- Adoor Bhasi
- Chakkittayil Udayakumar
- Anupama
- Vijayaraj
- Abutty
- Nilambur Balan
- Praveena
- Salam Karassery
- Adoor Pankajam
- Amir Khan
- Kani Bava
- Kayyalam
- Kuttyedathi Vilasini
- Lavanya
- Ravi Menon
- Vijayalakshmi

== Soundtrack ==
The music was composed by Kannur Rajan and the lyrics were written by Monu.

No.	Song	Singers	Lyrics	Length (m:ss)
1	"Asthamaya Sooryanu"	K. J. Yesudas, B. Savithri	Monu	
2	"Muthubeevi"	Zero Babu	Monu	
3	"Odivallam Thuzhanju"	Chandra, Madhu	Monu	
4	"Ponnambilikkala"	C. O. Anto, B. Savithri	Monu	
