= Viyarppinte Vila =

1962 Indian Malayalam-language film

- Directed by: M. Krishnan Nair
- Written by: T. E. Vasudevan; Ponkunnam Varkey (dialogues)
- Produced by: T. E. Vasudevan
- Starring: Sathyan; Adoor Bhasi; Thikkurissy Sukumaran Nair; Kedamangalam Sadanandan
- Cinematography: Adi M. Irani
- Edited by: M. S. Mani
- Music by: V. Dakshinamoorthy
- Production company: Jaya Maruthi
- Distributed by: Jaya Maruthi
- Release date: 1 December 1962
- Country: India
- Language: Malayalam

Viyarppinte Vila is a 1962 Indian Malayalam-language film, directed by M. Krishnan Nair and produced by T. E. Vasudevan. The film stars Sathyan, Adoor Bhasi, Thikkurissy Sukumaran Nair and Kedamangalam Sadanandan in lead roles. V. Dakshinamoorthy composed the music.

== Cast ==
- Sathyan as Gopi
- Kalaikkal Kumaran as Manogathakkaran
- Adoor Bhasi as Anthony
- Thikkurissy Sukumaran Nair as Krishana Kuruppu
- Kedamangalam Sadanandan as Gopalakuruppu
- Muthukulam Raghavan Pillai as Pappu Pilla
- Prathapachandran as Vaidyar
- Aranmula Ponnamma as Sarasu
- Bahadoor as Pupshangathan
- O. Madhavan as Bhasi
- Ragini as Omana

== Soundtrack ==
The music was composed by V. Dakshinamoorthy and the lyrics were written by Abhayadev.

No.	Song	Singers	Lyrics	Length (m:ss)
1	"Ilamkaavil Bhagavathy"	Chorus, Renuka, Vinodini	Abhayadev	
2	"Kamaneeya Keralame"	P. Leela, Renuka	Abhayadev	
3	"Kamaneeyakeralame" (Bit)	K. J. Yesudas	Abhayadev	
4	"Kochu Kuruvi Vaa Vaa"	K. J. Yesudas, P. Leela	Abhayadev	
5	"Koottile Kiliyaanu Njaan"	P. Leela	Abhayadev	
6	"Munnottu Poku Sahaja"	P. B. Sreenivas	Abhayadev	
7	"Omanakkanna"	P. Leela	Abhayadev	
8	"Thedithediyalanju Njan"	P. Leela, P. B. Sreenivas	Abhayadev	
9	"Varumo Varumo Gokulapaala"	P. Leela	Abhayadev	
10	"Vighnangalokkeyum"	V. Dakshinamoorthy	Abhayadev	
