= Samasya =

- Poster
- Directed by: K. Thankappan
- Screenplay by: K. S. Namboothiri
- Produced by: T. Surendran
- Starring: Madhu; Srividya; Kamal Haasan; Sankaradi
- Cinematography: R. N. Pillai
- Edited by: K. B. Singh
- Music by: Shyam; K. P. Udayabhanu
- Production company: Kalaratnam Films
- Distributed by: Kalaratnam Films
- Release date: 27 February 1976
- Country: India
- Language: Malayalam

Samasya is a 1976 Indian Malayalam-language film directed by K. Thankappan. The film stars Madhu, Srividya, Kamal Haasan and Sankaradi in the lead roles. The film has musical score by Shyam and K. P. Udayabhanu.

== Cast ==
- Madhu
- Srividya
- Kamal Haasan
- Sankaradi
- Anandavally
- Balan K. Nair
- Kuthiravattam Pappu
- M. G. Soman
- Premji
- Sangeetha

== Production ==
Samasya film produced by T. Surendran under production banner Kalaratnam Films. It was given an "U" (Unrestricted) certificate by the Central Board of Film Certification. The final length of the film was 3,617.37 metres (11,868.0 ft).

== Soundtrack ==
The music was composed by Shyam and K. P. Udayabhanu and the lyrics were written by P. Bhaskaran, O. N. V. Kurup and Bichu Thirumala.

Music by Shyam
No.	Title	Lyrics	Singer(s)	Length
1.	"Adithottu Mudiyolam"	P. Bhaskaran	S. Janaki
2.	"Mrigamadasugandha Thilakam"	Bichu Thirumala	K. J. Yesudas

Music by K. P. Udayabhanu
No.	Title	Lyrics	Singer(s)	Length
1.	"Abhayam Neeye"	O. N. V. Kurup	Lekha K. Nair
2.	"Kili Chilachu"	O. N. V. Kurup	K. J. Yesudas
3.	"Mangalayaathira Rathri"	O. N. V. Kurup	Lekha K. Nair, Chorus
4.	"Nirapara Chaarthiya"	O. N. V. Kurup	P. Susheela
5.	"Poojayum Manthravum"	O. N. V. Kurup	Raveendran, Chorus
