= Rakthabandham =

- Directed by: M. R. Vittal
- Written by: K. Chellappan Pillai
- Screenplay by: K. Chellappan Pillai
- Produced by: N. K. Karunakaran Pillai
- Starring: Kalaikkal Kumaran; T. R. Omana
- Cinematography: Shanmugham
- Edited by: T. M. Lal
- Music by: S. M. Subbaiah Naidu; S. N. Chaami (S. N. Ranganathan)
- Release date: 18 May 1951
- Country: India
- Language: Malayalam

Rakthabandham is a 1951 Indian Malayalam-language film, directed by M. R. Vittal and produced by N. K. Karunakaran Pillai. The film stars Kalaikkal Kumaran and T. R. Omana. The film has a musical score by S. M. Subbaiah Naidu and S. N. Chaami (S. N. Ranganathan). It is the only Malayalam film directed by Velswami Kavi. It is the debut Malayalam film of S. D. Subbiah and the debut film of Paravoor Bharathan (as a bank peon), Kuttappa Bhagavathar, and lyricist Swami Brahmavrathan. The movie also introduced R. S. Prabhu to Malayalam cinema.

== Cast ==
- T. R. Omana
- Kalaikkal Kumaran
- Kuttappan Bhagavathar
- S. J. Dev
- Vaikkam Mani
- Pisharody
- Meenakshi (Old)
- Cherthala Vasudeva Kurup
- Rajamma
- S. D. Subbayya
- Paravoor Bharathan (debut)
