= Raajaveedhi =

- Directed by: Senan
- Written by: Sherif
- Screenplay by: Sherif
- Produced by: Panayil Bhaskaran Nair
- Starring: Raghavan; Adoor Pankajam; Ambika; Aranmula Ponnamma
- Cinematography: T. N. Krishnankutty Nair
- Edited by: N. P. Suresh
- Music by: A. T. Ummer; Lyrics: Bichu Thirumala
- Production company: Navachitra Arts
- Distributed by: Navachitra Arts
- Release date: 16 November 1979
- Country: India
- Language: Malayalam

Raajaveedhi is a 1979 Indian Malayalam film, directed by Senan and produced by Panayil Bhaskaran Nair. The film stars Raghavan, Adoor Pankajam, Ambika and Aranmula Ponnamma in the lead roles. The film has musical score by A. T. Ummer.

== Cast ==
- Raghavan
- Adoor Pankajam
- Ambika
- Aranmula Ponnamma
- Sadhana

== Soundtrack ==
The music was composed by A. T. Ummer and the lyrics were written by Bichu Thirumala.

No.	Song	Singers	Lyrics	Length (m:ss)
1	"Khajurahoyile"	Vani Jairam, Rajkumar	Bichu Thirumala	
2	"Panineeraninja"	S. Janaki	Bichu Thirumala	
3	"Pashchimaambarathinte"	Rajkumar	Bichu Thirumala	
4	"Simhaasanangal Vidaparanju"	K. J. Yesudas	Bichu Thirumala	
5	"Somavadane Shobhane"	K. J. Yesudas, Vani Jairam	Bichu Thirumala	
