= Periyar (1973 film) =

Indian-Malayalam language film

- Directed by: P. J. Antony
- Written by: P. J. Antony
- Starring: Sudheer; Raghavan; P. J. Antony; Ushanandini; Thilakan
- Cinematography: T. N. Krishnankutty Nair
- Music by: K. V. Job; P. K. Sivadas
- Production company: Periyar Movies
- Distributed by: Manneth films
- Release date: 16 February 1973
- Country: India
- Language: Malayalam

Periyar is a 1973 Indian Malayalam-language film, directed by P. J. Antony. The film stars Thilakan, Raghavan, P. J. Antony and Sudheer. Its musical score was by K. V. Job and P. K. Sivadas. It was also the debut movie of Thilakan, who later became a major actor of character roles.

== Cast ==
- Sudheer
- Raghavan
- Ushanandini
- Thilakan
- Kaviyoor Ponnamma
- P. J. Antony
- Sankaradi
- Alleppey Vincent
- Khadeeja
- Radhamani

== Soundtrack ==
The music was composed by K. V. Job and P. K. Sivadas with lyrics by P. J. Antony.

No.	Song	Singers	Lyrics	Length (m:ss)
1	"Anthivilakku"	S. Janaki, Freddy	P. J. Antony	
2	"Bindu Bindu"	P. Jayachandran	P. J. Antony	
3	"Jeevitham Oru Gaanam"	Mehboob	P. J. Antony	
4	"Marakkaanum Piriyaanum"	S. Janaki, Freddy	P. J. Antony	
5	"Periyaare Periyaare"	K. J. Yesudas	P. J. Antony	
