= Santo Krishnan =

Indian stunt performer (1920–2013)

Santo Krishnan, originally named Krishnan Nair, (12 May 1920 – 6 July 2013) born in Ottapalam was an Indian athlete and film stuntsman. He appeared in more than 1,000 films in Malayalam, Tamil, Sinhala, Telugu, Kannada, Hindi and English. He died on 6 July 2013.

== Career and personal life ==
Krishnan Nair, known simply as Krishnan, was a noted weightlifter, wrestler, and Tamil film actor, debuting in Mahaveera Bhiman (1935). He built a loyal fan base through his performances.

Krishnan was married to Kochukutty Amma, who died in 2012. They had no children. During the last 10–15 years of his life, he was cared for by his neighbor Haneefa, who shared a father-son bond with him and even built a room on his property for Krishnan's comfort. Haneefa, along with his wife Laila and their children Hasheeba, Suhail, and Suhaiba, assisted him with daily living and basic needs during his later years.

== Death ==
Krishnan died on 6 July 2013 at Lakkidi, India. The cause of death was a bout of sickness he had encountered during the weeks leading to his death. He was aged 93 and was cremated near his home.

== Filmography ==
- Meesa Madhavan (2002) (Malayalam)
- Malayali Mamanu Vanakkam (2002) (Malayalam)
- Amaram (1991) (Malayalam)
- Njan Piranna Nattil (1985) as Mental patient (Malayalam)
- Uyarum Njan Nadake (1985) as Moopan (Malayalam)
- Poomadhathe Pennu (1984) as Gunda (Malayalam)
- Hello Madras Girl (1983) (Malayalam)
- Prathijnja (1983) (Malayalam)
- Nagamadathu Thampuratti (1982) (Malayalam)
- Valarthumrugangal (1981) (Malayalam)
- Vayal (1981) as Gunda (Malayalam)
- Ithikkarappakki (1980) (Malayalam)
- Lava (1980) (Malayalam)
- Light House (1976) as Velu (Malayalam)
- Bhoomidevi Pushpiniyayi (1974) (Malayalam)
- Thacholi Marumakan Chandu (1974) (Malayalam)
- Ajnathavasam (1973) (Malayalam)
- Maravil Thirivu Sookshikkuka (1973) as Gopalan (Malayalam)
- Azhakulla Saleena (1973) (Malayalam)
- Police Ariyaruthe (1973) (Malayalam)
- Savaale Samali (1971) (Tamil)
- Rakthapushpam (1970) (Malayalam)
- Thalaivan (1970) (Malayalam)
- Lankadahanam (1970) (Malayalam)
- Aaryankavu Kollasangam (1969) (Malayalam)
- Love In Kerala (1968) (Malayalam)
- Maadatharuvi (1967) (Malayalam)
- Pareeksha (1967) (Malayalam)
- Sthanarthi Saramma (1966) as Kuriachan (Malayalam)
- Muthalali (1965) as Watchman (Malayalam)
- Subaidha (1965) (Malayalam)
- Nithyakanyaka (1963) (Malayalam)
- Puthiya Akasam Puthiya Bhoomi (1962) as Kuttan (Malayalam)
- Sampoorna Ramayanam (1958 film) as Hanuman (Tamil)
- Minnunnathellaam Ponnalla (1957) (Malayalam)
- Kundalakesi (1946) (Kannada)
- Sakata Yogam (1946) (Tamil)
- Mahaveera Bhiman (1935) (Tamil)
