= Sreekovil (film) =

- Directed by: P. A. Thomas; S. Ramanathan
- Written by: S. Ramanathan; S. L. Puram Sadanandan (dialogues)
- Screenplay by: S. L. Puram Sadanandan
- Produced by: N. Krishnan
- Starring: Sathyan; Thikkurissy Sukumaran Nair; P. A. Thomas; Ambika
- Cinematography: P. K. Madhavan Nair
- Music by: V. Dakshinamoorthy
- Production company: Lotus Pictures
- Distributed by: Lotus Pictures
- Release date: 13 April 1962
- Country: India
- Language: Malayalam

Sreekovil is a 1962 Indian Malayalam-language film, directed by P. A. Thomas and S. Ramanathan and produced by N. Krishnan. The film stars Sathyan, Thikkurissy Sukumaran Nair, P. A. Thomas and Ambika in the lead roles. The film had musical score by V. Dakshinamoorthy.

== Cast ==
- Sathyan
- Thikkurissy Sukumaran Nair
- P. A. Thomas
- Ambika
- Kanchana
- Kottarakkara Sreedharan Nair
- S. P. Pillai
- K. V. Shanthi

== Soundtrack ==
The music was composed by V. Dakshinamoorthy and lyrics were written by Abhayadev.

No.	Song	Singers	Lyrics	Length (m:ss)
1	"Azhakil Mayangaathaarundu"	Santha P. Nair	Abhayadev	
2	"Ellaarkkum Ennekkandaal"	K. J. Yesudas, P. Leela	Abhayadev	
3	"Maanasaveena Muzhangi"	P. Leela	Abhayadev	
4	"Manjakkuruvi Paadamo"	Santha P. Nair	Abhayadev	
5	"Marakkaruthe Marakkaruthe"	K. P. Udayabhanu, Santha P. Nair	Abhayadev	
6	"Neru Parayoo Neru Parayoo"	P. Leela	Abhayadev	
7	"Sreecharanaambujam"	P. Leela	Abhayadev	
8	"Thorukille Mizhi"	P. Leela	Abhayadev	
9	"Vedaavaakyam Naranonneyathu"	K. J. Yesudas	Abhayadev	
