= Ernakulam Junction (film) =

- Directed by: Vijayanarayanan
- Written by: N. Govindankutty
- Screenplay by: N. Govindankutty
- Produced by: Ragunath
- Starring: Prem Nazir; Ragini; Sujatha; Vincent
- Cinematography: C. Ramachandra Menon
- Edited by: K. Narayanan; Neelakantan; Vellachami
- Music by: M. S. Baburaj
- Production company: Sanjay Productions
- Distributed by: Sanjay Productions
- Release date: 3 December 1971
- Country: India
- Language: Malayalam

Ernakulam Junction is a 1971 Indian Malayalam film, directed by Vijayanarayanan and produced by Ragunath. The film stars Prem Nazir, Ragini, Sujatha and Vincent in the lead roles. The film had musical score by M. S. Baburaj.

== Cast ==
- Prem Nazir as CID Madhu, Vikram and Ravi (Triple role)
- Ragini as Malathi
- Sujatha as Jaya (Madhu's Sister)
- Vincent as Thambi
- Jesey
- T. S. Muthaiah as Vasavan
- Latheef as Latheef
- Abbas
- Prathapachandran as Police Officer John
- Bahadoor as Kunjali
- Girija
- Khadeeja as Vilasini
- Mathew Plathottam
- N. Govindankutty
- Ramankutty Menon
- Sadhana
- Sudheer
- Vanchiyoor Radha
- Vimala

== Soundtrack ==
The music was composed by M. S. Baburaj and the lyrics were written by P. Bhaskaran.

No.	Song	Singers	Lyrics	Length (m:ss)
1	"Anganayennal"	K. J. Yesudas	P. Bhaskaran	
2	"Mullamalarthen Kinnam" (Bit)	P. Jayachandran, P. Leela	P. Bhaskaran	
3	"Mullamalarthenkinnam"	P. Jayachandran, P. Leela	P. Bhaskaran	
4	"Orikkalen Swapnathinte"	K. J. Yesudas, L. R. Anjali	P. Bhaskaran	
5	"Thaalam Nalla Thaalam"	L. R. Eeswari	P. Bhaskaran	
6	"Vanarodanam Kettuvo"	S. Janaki	P. Bhaskaran	
