= Bharthavu =

1964 film

- Directed by: M. Krishnan Nair
- Written by: T. E. Vasudevan; Kanam EJ (dialogues)
- Screenplay by: Kanam E. J.
- Produced by: T. E. Vasudevan
- Starring: Sheela; Kaviyoor Ponnamma; Ramesh; T. S. Muthaiah
- Cinematography: N. S. Mani
- Edited by: T. R. Sreenivasalu
- Music by: V. Dakshinamoorthy; M. S. Baburaj
- Production company: Jaya Maruthi
- Distributed by: Jaya Maruthi
- Release date: 23 November 1964
- Country: India
- Language: Malayalam

Bharthavu (transl. The Husband) is a 1964 Indian Malayalam film, directed by M. Krishnan Nair and produced by T. E. Vasudevan. The film stars Sheela, Kaviyoor Ponnamma, Ramesh and T. S. Muthaiah in the lead roles. The film had musical score by V. Dakshinamoorthy and M. S. Baburaj.

== Cast ==
- Sheela
- Kaviyoor Ponnamma
- Ramesh
- T. S. Muthaiah
- Prathapachandran
- Adoor Pankajam
- Baby Vinodini
- Bahadoor
- Chandran
- K. B. Kurup
- P. A. Krishnan
- Simhalan
- T. K. Balachandran
- Vijayakumar
- Alex

== Soundtrack ==
The music was composed by V. Dakshinamoorthy and M. S. Baburaj and the lyrics were written by P. Bhaskaran.

No.	Song	Singers	Lyrics	Length (m:ss)
1	"Bhaaram Vallaatha Bhaaram"	K. J. Yesudas	P. Bhaskaran	
2	"Kaakkakuyile Cholloo"	K. J. Yesudas, L. R. Eeswari	P. Bhaskaran	
3	"Kaneerozhukkuvaan Maathram"	Gomathy	P. Bhaskaran	
4	"Kollaam Kollaam"	M. S. Baburaj, Uthaman	P. Bhaskaran	
5	"Naagaswarathinte"	L. R. Eeswari], Chorus	P. Bhaskaran	
6	"Orikkaloru Poovalankili"	P. Leela	P. Bhaskaran	
7	"Swargathil Pokumbol"	A. P. Komala, Uthaman	P. Bhaskaran	
