= Mulkireedam =

- Directed by: N. N. Pisharady
- Written by: Kaladi Gopi
- Produced by: N. N. Pisharady
- Starring: Sharada; Adoor Bhasi; P. J. Antony; Sankaradi
- Music by: Prathap Singh
- Release date: 22 December 1967
- Country: India
- Language: Malayalam

Mulkireedam is a 1967 Indian Malayalam film, directed and produced by N. N. Pisharady. The film stars Sharada, Adoor Bhasi, P. J. Antony and Sankaradi in the lead roles. The film had musical score by Prathap Singh.

== Cast ==
- Sathyan
- Sharada
- Adoor Bhasi
- P. J. Antony
- Sankaradi
- T. R. Omana
- Indira Thampi
- N. Govindankutty
- Nellikode Bhaskaran
- S. P. Pillai

== Soundtrack ==
The music was composed by Prathap Singh and the lyrics were written by P. Bhaskaran.

No.	Song	Singers	Lyrics	Length (m:ss)
1	"Deva Yeshunaayaka"	Thambi	P. Bhaskaran	
2	"Kanakaswapna"	S. Janaki	P. Bhaskaran	
3	"Kookaatha Poonkuyile"	Thambi	P. Bhaskaran	
4	"Kulikazhinju"	S. Janaki	P. Bhaskaran]	
