= Kadalamma =

- Directed by: Kunchacko
- Written by: Ponkunnam Varkey
- Produced by: M. Kunchacko
- Starring: Sathyan; Rajasri; B. S. Saroja; Maya; Kottarakkara Sridharan Nair
- Music by: G. Devarajan
- Production company: Excel Productions
- Distributed by: Excel Productions
- Release date: 8 June 1963
- Country: India
- Language: Malayalam

Kadalamma (transl. Mother sea) is a 1963 Indian Malayalam-language film directed and produced by Kunchacko and written by Ponkunnam Varkey. The film stars Sathyan, Rajasri, B. S. Saroja and Maya in the lead roles. The film had musical score by G. Devarajan.

== Cast ==
- Sathyan as Neelan
- Rajasree as Renuka & Radha
- B. S. Saroja as Chirutha
- Maya as Karthi
- Sankaradi as Kochuvelu
- Kottayam Chellappan
- Nellikkodu Bhaskaran as Udumbankunju
- S. P. Pillai as Ramabhadran
- K. S. Gopinath
- Bahadoor as Shikar
- Mavelikkara Ponnamma as Chithrangatha
- Kottarakkara Sreedharan Nair as Jayarajan
- Adoor Pankajam as Kaliyamma
- M. S. Thripunithura
- Master Boban as Young Neelan
- Baby Vilasini as Young Renuka
- Baby Vinodini as young Karthi
- Manavalan Joseph as Dumdum

== Soundtrack ==
The music was composed by G. Devarajan and the lyrics were written by Vayalar Ramavarma.

No.	Song	Singers	Lyrics	Length (m:ss)
1	"Aayirathiri"	S. Janaki, Chorus, Jikki	Vayalar Ramavarma	
2	"Ethu Kadalilo"	P. Susheela	Vayalar Ramavarma	
3	"Jaladevathamaare"	K. J. Yesudas, P. Susheela	Vayalar Ramavarma	
4	"Kadalamme Kadalamme Kaniyukayille"	P. Leela	Vayalar Ramavarma	
5	"Kummiyadikkuvin"	G. Devarajan, C. O. Anto, Gracy	Vayalar Ramavarma	
6	"Mungi Mungi"	S. Janaki, Jikki	Vayalar Ramavarma	
7	"Muthu Tharaam" (Bit)	K. J. Yesudas, P. Susheela	Vayalar Ramavarma	
8	"Oonjaaloonjaalu"	P. Leela	Vayalar Ramavarma	
9	"Paalaazhikkadavil"	P. Susheela, A. M. Rajah	Vayalar Ramavarma	
10	"Thiruvaathirayude Natteenno"	S. Janaki	Vayalar Ramavarma	
11	"Varamaruluka"	P. Leela	Vayalar Ramavarma	
