= P. J. Antony =

Indian film actor

- Antony in Nirmalyam
- Born: 1 January 1925; Eranakulam, Cochin State, British Raj (now Kerala, India)
- Died: 14 March 1979 (aged 54); Madras, Tamil Nadu, India
- Occupations: Soldier, Actor, Director, Script Writer, Lyricist, Novelist
- Years active: 1958–1979
- Spouse: Smt. Mary (1954–1979) (his death)
- Children: 2
- Awards: National Film Award for Best Actor Kerala State Film Awards; 1973 - Nirmalyam

P. J. Antony (1 January 1925 – 14 March 1979) was an Indian stage and film actor. He received the National Film Award for Best Actor for his performance in Nirmalyam in 1974, becoming the first Malayalam cinema actor to receive the award. Antony was also a respected figure in the professional theatre, working with communist cultural and art bodies like the K.P.A.C.

He also established his own theatre, named Prathibha Theatres, in Kochi.

== Biography ==
In his early 20s, Antony served in the Royal Navy during World War II. Post-war, he returned home and joined a workshop as an officer. It was in this period that Antony got a chance to work with professional theatre artists. Soon he established himself as a prominent figure in Malayalam plays with his skills in acting, writing and direction. He was directly associated with the K.P.A.C., a major political drama theater at that time. He later established two theaters of his own, namely P. J. Theatres and Prathibha Theatres (which is still active).

Building on his expertise in stage plays, Antony began his film acting career. His debut film was Randidangazhi (1957), a film adaptation of Thakazhi Sivasankara Pillai's novel of the same title. He won the National Film Award for Best Actor (known then, in 1974, as the Bharath Award) for his performance as a velichappadu (an oracle or medium between the Goddess and the worshipper in a Hindu temple) in Nirmalyam, directed by prominent literary figure M. T. Vasudevan Nair. Antony was the lyricist and screenwriter for a small number of films. He also directed a film titled Periyar.

In a historical drama, Amal Neerad's Iyobinte Pusthakam had the famous director Aashiq Abu playing the role of P. J. Antony, though in a guest appearance.

== Awards ==
National Film Awards:

- Best Actor - 1974 - Nirmalyam

Kerala State Film Awards:

- Best Actor - 1973 - Nirmalyam

Filmfare Awards South:

- Best Actor - 1974 - Nirmalyam

== Filmography ==
=== As actor ===
==== 1950s ====
Year	Title	Role	Notes
1958	Randidangazhi	Koran	

==== 1960s ====
Year	Title	Role	Notes
1961	Mudiyanaya Puthran	Vasu	
1962	Kalpadukal		
1963	Ninamanija Kalpadukal	Thankamma's husband	
1963	Ammaye Kaanaan	Sukumaran Nair	
1964	Kalanjukittiya Thankam	Kuttan Nair	
1964	Oral Koodi Kallanayi		
1964	Ore Bhoomi Ore Raktham		
1964	Aadyakiranangal	Kariyachan	
1964	Thacholi Othenan	Kathiroor Gurukkal	
1964	Bhargavi Nilayam	Narayanan Nair (Nanukuttan)	
1965	Rosie		
1965	Murappennu	Kunjikrishana Menon	
1966	Kunjali Marakkar	Zamorin's nephew	
1966	Tharavattamma	Govinda Pilla	
1967	Balyakalasakhi		
1967	Ashwamedham	Keshavan Swamy	
1967	Anweshichu Kandethiyilla	Unnunnichayan	
1967	Kavalam Chundan		
1967	Sheelavathi	Athri Maharshi	
1967	Iruttinte Athmavu	Gopalan Nair	
1967	Kamuki		
1967	Pareeksha	Neelakanda Pilla	
1967	Mulkireedam		
1967	Nagarame Nandi	Anandan Pillai	
1967	Chekuthante Kotta		
1968	Manaswini		
1968	Punnapra Vayalar	Kochu Naanu	
1968	Kayalkkarayil		
1968	Lakshaprabhu		
1968	Asuravithu	Kunjarikkar	
1969	Veettumriam		
1969	Virunnukari	Raghava Menon	
1969	Kattukurangu	Vasavan	
1969	Nadhi	Mullakkal Varkey	

==== 1970s ====
Year	Title	Role	Notes
1970	Dathuputhran	Maanichan	
1970	Kurukshethram		
1970	Kakkathamburatti	Kochupaappu	
1970	Cross Belt	Sekhara Panikkar	
1970	Pearl View	Xavier	
1970	Moodalmanju		
1971	Jalakanyaka		
1972	Manushyabandhangal	Sanku Pilla	
1973	Ragging		
1973	Dharmayudham	Naanu	
1973	Periyar		
1973	Nirmalyam	Velichapad	
1975	Athithi		
1975	Odakkuzhal		
1977	Nurayum Pathayum		
1978	Paadasaram	Pulluvan	
1979	Choola		
1979	Manninte Maril		

==== 2020s ====
Year	Title	Role	Notes
2022	Bheeshma Parvam	Paily Anjoottikkaran (Paily Chettayi) (deceased)	Photo presence

=== Director ===
- Periyar (1973)

=== Screenwriter ===
- Sheelavathi (1968)
- C.I.D. Nazir (1971)
- Rosie (1965)

== Literary works ==
P. J. Antony has authored 30 short stories, 100 songs, 41 dramas, 2 autobiographies.

=== Short stories ===
- Pukachurulukal
- Kalakavan
- Naludivasangal
- Ennayillaatha vilakku
- Chilampoli
- Thakarnna veena
- Aa moksham ningalkku venda

=== Novels ===
- Itha manushyan
- Orugramathinte Athmavu

=== Poems ===
- Prabhatha geetham

=== Song collections ===
- Onappattukal
- Thakarnna veena
- Prema sangheetham
- Keralam Unarunnu

=== Memories ===
- Ente nadaka smaranakal
- Natakame Ulakam
