= 10th National Film Awards =

Indian ceremony celebrating cinema of 1962

- Awarded for: Best of Indian cinema in 1962
- Awarded by: Ministry of Information and Broadcasting
- Presented by: Sarvepalli Radhakrishnan (President of India)
- Presented on: 20 April 1963
- Site: Vigyan Bhavan, New Delhi
- Official website: dff.nic.in
- Best Feature Film: Dada Thakur

The 10th National Film Awards, then known as State Awards for Films, presented by Ministry of Information and Broadcasting, India to felicitate the best of Indian Cinema released in 1962. Ceremony took place at Vigyan Bhavan, New Delhi on 21 April 1963 and awards were given by then President of India, Dr. Sarvepalli Radhakrishnan.

== Awards ==
Awards were divided into feature films and non-feature films.

President's gold medal for the All India Best Feature Film is now better known as National Film Award for Best Feature Film, whereas President's gold medal for the Best Documentary Film is analogous to today's National Film Award for Best Non-Feature Film. For children's films, Prime Minister's gold medal is now given as National Film Award for Best Children's Film. At the regional level, President's silver medal for Best Feature Film is now given as National Film Award for Best Feature Film in a particular language. Certificate of Merit in all the categories is discontinued over the years.

=== Feature films ===
Feature films were awarded at All India as well as regional level. For the 10th National Film Awards, a Bengali film Dada Thakur won the President's gold medal for the All India Best Feature Film. Following were the awards given:

==== All India Award ====
Following were the awards given in each category:

Award	Film	Language	Awardee(s)	Cash prize
President's gold medal for the All India Best Feature Film	Dada Thakur	Bengali	Producer: Shyamlal Jalan	Gold Medal and ₹20,000
President's gold medal for the All India Best Feature Film	Dada Thakur	Bengali	Director: Sudhir Mukherjee	₹5,000
All India Certificate of Merit for the Second Best Feature Film	Abhijan	Bengali	Producer: Abhijatrik	Certificate of Merit and ₹10,000
All India Certificate of Merit for the Second Best Feature Film	Abhijan	Bengali	Director: Satyajit Ray	₹2,500
All India Certificate of Merit for the Third Best Feature Film	Sautela Bhai	Hindi	Producer: Alok Bharati	Certificate of Merit only
All India Certificate of Merit for the Third Best Feature Film	Sautela Bhai	Hindi	Director: Mahesh Kaul	Certificate of Merit only
All India Certificate of Merit for the Best Children's Film	Raju Aur Gangaram	Hindi	Producer: Children's Film Society	Certificate of Merit only
All India Certificate of Merit for the Best Children's Film	Raju Aur Gangaram	Hindi	Director: Ezra Mir	Certificate of Merit only

==== Regional Award ====
The awards were given to the best films made in the regional languages of India.

With 10th National Film Awards, new award category was introduced for the feature films made in Punjabi language. This newly introduced category includes President's silver medal for Best Feature Film in Assamese and Certificate of Merit for second and third best film, although former was not given as no film was found suitable for the award.

For feature films in Assamese, Kannada, Malayalam, Odia and Punjabi, President's silver medal for Best Feature Film was not given, instead Certificate of Merit for Best Feature Film was awarded.

Award	Film	Awardee(s)	
Award	Film	Producer	Director
Feature Films in Assamese
Certificate of Merit for the Best Feature Film	Tezimola	Anwar Hussain	Anwar Hussain
Feature Films in Bengali
President's silver medal for Best Feature Film	Kancher Swarga	Prokash Chandra Nan	Yatrik
Certificate of Merit for the Second Best Feature Film	Nishithe	Agragami Productions	Agragami
Feature Films in Hindi
President's silver medal for Best Feature Film	Sahib Bibi Aur Ghulam	Guru Dutt	Abrar Alvi
Feature Films in Kannada
Certificate of Merit for the Best Feature Film
Certificate of Merit for the Best Feature Film	Nanda Deepa	U. S. Vadhiraj	M. R. Vittal
Certificate of Merit for the Best Feature Film	Nanda Deepa	U. Jawahar	M. R. Vittal
Feature Films in Malayalam
Certificate of Merit for the Best Feature Film	Puthiya Akasam Puthiya Bhoomi	Associated Producers	M. S. Mani
Certificate of Merit for the Second Best Feature Film	Kalpadukal	T. R. Raghavan	K. S. Anthony
Feature Films in Marathi
President's silver medal for Best Feature Film	Rangalya Ratri Asha	The Maharashtra Film Industrial Co-Operative Society Ltd.	Raja Thakur
Certificate of Merit for the Second Best Feature Film	Javai Majha Bhala	Maneesha Chitra Pvt Ltd.	Neelkanth Magdum
Certificate of Merit for the Third Best Feature Film	Gariba Gharchi Lek	Shivaji Gulabrao Katkar	Kamlakar Vishnu Torne
Feature Films in Odia
Certificate of Merit for the Best Feature Film	Surjyamukhi	Soumendra Misra	P. K. Sengupta
Certificate of Merit for the Second Best Feature Film	Lakshmi	Parvati Ghose	Sarda Naik
Certificate of Merit for the Second Best Feature Film	Lakshmi	G. P. Ghose	Sarda Naik
Feature Films in Punjabi
Certificate of Merit for the Best Feature Film	Chaudhary Karnail Singh	Krishnan Kumar	Krishnan Kumar
Feature Films in Tamil
President's silver medal for Best Feature Film	Nenjil Or Aalayam	Chithralaya	C. V. Sridhar
Certificate of Merit for the Second Best Feature Film	Annai	AVM Productions	Sarvashri R. Krishnan
Certificate of Merit for the Second Best Feature Film	Annai	AVM Productions	S. Panju
Certificate of Merit for the Third Best Feature Film	Sarada	Al. Srinivasan	K. S. Gopalakrishnan
Feature Films in Telugu
President's silver medal for Best Feature Film	Mahamantri Timmarusu	Gowthami Productions	Kamalakara Kameshwara Rao
Certificate of Merit for the Second Best Feature Film	Kula Gothralu	A. Subba Rao	Kotayya Pratyagatma
Certificate of Merit for the Third Best Feature Film	Siri Sampadalu	V. Venkateswarlu	P. Pullaiah

=== Non-Feature films ===
Non-feature film awards were given for the documentaries and educational films made in the country. Following were the awards given:

==== Documentaries ====
Award	Film	Language	Awardee(s)	Cash prize
President's gold medal for the Best Documentary Film	Four Centuries Ago	English	Producer: Films Division	Gold Medal and ₹4,000
President's gold medal for the Best Documentary Film	Four Centuries Ago	English	Director: Shanti Verma	₹1,000
All India Certificate of Merit for the Second Best Documentary Film	Himalayan Heritage	English	Producer: Films Division	Certificate of Merit and ₹2,000
All India Certificate of Merit for the Second Best Documentary Film	Himalayan Heritage	English	Director: N. S. Thapa	₹500
All India Certificate of Merit for the Third Best Documentary Film	The Telco Story	English	Producer: Hunnar Films	Certificate of Merit only
All India Certificate of Merit for the Third Best Documentary Film	The Telco Story	English	Director: Clement Baptista	Certificate of Merit only

==== Educational films ====
Award	Film	Language	Awardee(s)	Cash prize
All India Certificate of Merit for the Best Educational Film	Virginia Tobacco	English	Producer: Films Division	Certificate of Merit only
All India Certificate of Merit for the Best Educational Film	Virginia Tobacco	English	Director: P. R. S. Pillay	Certificate of Merit only
All India Certificate of Merit for the Second Best Educational Film	The Evolution and Races of Man	English	Producer: National Education and Information Film Ltd.	Certificate of Merit only
All India Certificate of Merit for the Second Best Educational Film	The Evolution and Races of Man	English	Director: S. Sukhdev	Certificate of Merit only

=== Awards not given ===
Following were the awards not given as no film was found to be suitable for the award:

- Prime Minister's gold medal for the Best Children's Film
- Prime Minister's gold medal for the Best Educational Film
- President's silver medal for Best Feature Film in Assamese
- President's silver medal for Best Feature Film in Kannada
- President's silver medal for Best Feature Film in Malayalam
- President's silver medal for Best Feature Film in Oriya
- President's silver medal for Best Feature Film in Punjabi
