= Kalayum Kaminiyum =

Kalayum Kaaminiyum
- Directed by: P. Subramaniam
- Written by: Kanam E. J.
- Screenplay by: Kanam E. J.
- Produced by: P. Subramaniam
- Starring: Prem Nazir; Kaviyoor Ponnamma; Thikkurissy Sukumaran Nair; Muthukulam Raghavan Pillai
- Cinematography: N. S. Mani
- Edited by: N. Gopalakrishnan
- Music by: M. B. Sreenivasan
- Production company: Neela
- Distributed by: Neela
- Release date: 21 December 1963
- Country: India
- Language: Malayalam

Kalayum Kaminiyum is a 1963 Indian Malayalam language film. E. J. Philip, popularly known by his pen name Kaanam E. J., was known for his social novels. Some of them were made into films. He wrote a few plays too. One of his short plays, Kalayum Changalayum, became very popular after it was published in a Malayalam weekly. P. Subramaniam came up with the screen version of this play under the title Kalayum Kaminiyum. The film was also directed by Subramaniam.

The film was a box office success and went on to win the national award for the second best film in Malayalam under the regional films category.

== Plot ==
Geetha loves Ravi, an artist and renowned playwright. Geetha is the only daughter of Ravi's uncle. But Ravi is in love with his classmate Usha. As time goes by, Ravi make a name for himself as a playwright. He marries Usha, which leaves Geetha heartbroken. But she does not reveal the reasons for her emotional distress.

The gossip mongering servant Panki spins stories and spreads rumours about Ravi and Geetha. This upsets Ravi's peaceful family life. Usha starts suspecting her husband. Panki makes Usha believe that Ravi loves Geetha more than her. Ravi even goes to the extent of persuading Geetha to marry. But Geetha is adamant that she will not marry.

Prompted by one of his friends, Ravi decides to submit an entry to a national drama competition. The actress who was supposed to play the female lead falls ill just before the competition. Geetha offers to help Ravi by agreeing to play this role, despite her father's opposition.

Geetha's father dies while she is in Delhi for the competition. Ravi once again requests her to reconsider her decision about marriage. This conversation between Ravi and Geetha is misrepresented by Panki. Usha is made to believe that Ravi is going to marry Geetha. In a fit of jealousy and fury, Usha decides to take revenge. She takes Geetha on a car drive. Ravi follows them in another car. He meets with an accident and is hospitalised.

Meanwhile, the news arrives that Ravi's play has won the national competition. But he dies before learning of his win.

The film ends with a message that mutual trust is the foundation of happy married life; suspicion can only help ruin peace and happiness in the family, resulting in tragedy.

== Cast ==
- Prem Nazir
- Ragini
- Kaviyoor Ponnamma
- Thikkurissy Sukumaran Nair
- Muthukulam Raghavan Pillai
- S. P. Pillai
- G. K. Pillai
- Adoor Pankajam
- Sreekantan Nair
- Aranmula Ponnamma
- Kalaikkal Kumaran
- Gopalakrishnan
- K. V. Shanthi

== Soundtrack ==
The music was composed by M. B. Sreenivasan and the lyrics were written by Thirunayinaarkurichi Madhavan Nair and P. Bhaskaran.

No.	Song	Singers	Lyrics	Length (m:ss)
1	"Innolam Enneppol"	P. Susheela	Thirunayinaarkurichi Madhavan Nair	
2	"Irannaal Kittaatha"	P. Susheela	P. Bhaskaran	
3	"Kaalathee Poomarachottil"	K. J. Yesudas, L. R. Eeswari, K. Rani	P. Bhaskaran	
4	"Kadhayilla Enikku"	K. J. Yesudas, P. Leela	P. Bhaskaran]	
5	"Kandille Vambu"	K. J. Yesudas, P. Leela	Thirunayinaarkurichi Madhavan Nair	
6	"Malakale Puzhakale"	P. B. Sreenivas	Thirunayinaarkurichi Madhavan Nair	
7	"Poyppoya Kaalam"	K. J. Yesudas, P. Susheela	P. Bhaskaran	
8	"Unnikkai Randilum"	P. Leela	P. Bhaskaran	
