= Anna (1964 film) =

1964 film

- Poster
- Directed by: K. S. Sethumadhavan
- Written by: K. T. Muhammad
- Starring: Sathyan; Ragini; T. R. Saroja; Kottarakkara Sridharan Nair
- Cinematography: P. Ramaswami
- Edited by: P. V. Narayanan
- Music by: G. Devarajan
- Production company: Lotus Pictures
- Distributed by: Lotus Pictures
- Release date: 5 March 1964
- Country: India
- Language: Malayalam

Anna, also Annavaru', is a 1964 Indian Malayalam-language film, directed K. S. Sethumadhavan. The film stars Sathyan, Ragini, T. R. Saroja and Kottarakkara Sridharan Nair. The film had musical score by G. Devarajan.

== Cast ==
- Sathyan
- Ragini as Anna
- Sukumari
- T. R. Omana
- T. R. Saroja
- P. .K Rajam
- Adoor Pankajam
- Kalyanikkutty
- Kottarakkara Sreedharan Nair
- Kottayam Chellappan
- Kuthiravattam Pappu
- S. P. Pillai
- Johnson

== Soundtrack ==
The music was composed by G. Devarajan and the lyrics were written by Vayalar Ramavarma.

No.	Song	Singers	Lyrics	Length (m:ss)
1	"Angethilingethil"	P. Susheela	Vayalar Ramavarma	
2	"Aruvee"	K. J. Yesudas, S. Janaki	Vayalar Ramavarma	
3	"Karutha Penne"	K. J. Yesudas	Vayalar Ramavarma	
4	"Manoraajyathinnathirilla"	S. Janaki, P. Leela	Vayalar Ramavarma	
5	"Naanichu Poyi"	P. Leela	Vayalar Ramavarma	
6	"Ponnaninja Rathri"	L. R. Eeswari	Vayalar Ramavarma	
7	"Pranayam Pranayam Pranayam"	Mani, Pattom Sadan, Peter	Vayalar Ramavarma	
8	"Urukiyuruki"	P. Susheela	Vayalar Ramavarma	
