= P. Ramdas =

Indian film director and screenwriter

- Born: December 1933; Ayyanthole, Thrissur, British India
- Died: 27 March 2014 (aged 80); Kottayam, Kerala
- Occupations: Film director, screenwriter

P. Ramdas (December 1933 – 27 March 2014) was an Indian film director and screenwriter, best known for his film Newspaper Boy, which was influenced by Italian neorealism. In 2007, he was awarded the J. C. Daniel Award, Kerala government's highest honour for contributions to Malayalam cinema. He was a student of Church Mission Society High School, Thrissur (CMSHSS, Thrissur).

Ramdas had two sons. He died on 27 March 2014 at the age of 83 due to age-related ailments.

== Filmography ==
Year	Title
1955	Newspaper Boy
1976	Nirapara
1981	Vadakaveettile Adithi
