= Snehadeepam =

- Directed by: P. Subramaniam
- Written by: Muttathu Varkey
- Produced by: P. Subramaniam
- Edited by: K. D. George
- Music by: M. B. Sreenivasan
- Production companies: Neela Productions; Merryland Studio
- Distributed by: Jaya Release
- Release date: 31 March 1962
- Country: India
- Language: Malayalam

Snehadeepam (transl. The Lamp of Love) is a 1962 Malayalam language film, directed and produced by P. Subramaniam. Written by novelist Muttathu Varkey, it stars Thikkurissy Sukumaran Nair, Kottarakkara Sreedharan Nair, S. P. Pillai, Miss Kumari, Ambika, Santhi, Baby Vinodini, Adoor Pankajam, T. K. Balachandran and Aranmula Ponnamma.

== Cast ==
- Thikkurissy Sukumaran Nair as Sreedharan
- Adoor Pankajam as Kochu Narayani/Naani
- Ambika Sukumaran as Vilasini
- Baby Vinodini (Vinodini Sasimohan) as Usha
- Kottarakkara Sreedharan Nair as Sankar
- Miss Kumari as Lakshmi
- S. P. Pillai as Njaramban/Karnan
- K. V. Shanthi as Prabha
- T. K. Balachandran as Chandran
- Pankajavalli as Devakiyamma
- Aranmula Ponnamma as Kalyani
- Vanchiyoor Radha as Madhavi
- Kaduvakulam Antony as Factory worker

== Soundtrack ==
The music was composed by M. B. Sreenivasan and lyrics were written by P. Bhaskaran.

No.	Song	Singers	Lyrics	Length (m:ss)
1	"Aaromalaale"	P. Leela	P. Bhaskaran	
2	"Ashaavasantham Anuraagasungandham"	Jikki	P. Bhaskaran	
3	"Chandrante Prabhayil"	S. Janaki, Kamukara	P. Bhaskaran	
4	"Kaamadahanaa"	P. Leela	P. Bhaskaran	
5	"Maalaa Maalaa"	Chorus, Jikki, Renuka	P. Bhaskaran	
6	"Maamala Naattil"	Kamukara, Chorus, K. Jamuna Rani	P. Bhaskaran	
7	"Moodayaam Sahodari"	P. B. Sreenivas, Chorus	P. Bhaskaran	
8	"Odum Paava Chaadum Paava"	S. Janaki, Kamukara	P. Bhaskaran	
9	"Onnaamtharam"	Latha Raju	P. Bhaskaran	
