= Chilamboli =

- Directed by: G. K. Ramu
- Written by: Chinthamani; Thikkurissy Sukumaran Nair (dialogues)
- Screenplay by: Thikkurissy Sukumaran Nair
- Produced by: Kalyanakrishna Iyer
- Starring: Prem Nazir; Sukumari; Adoor Bhasi; Thikkurissy Sukumaran Nair
- Cinematography: G. K. Ramu
- Edited by: P. Venkatachalam
- Music by: V. Dakshinamoorthy
- Production company: Vrindavan Pictures
- Distributed by: Vrindavan Pictures
- Release date: 28 September 1963
- Country: India
- Language: Malayalam

Chilamboli (transl. The Tinkle of the Anklet) is a 1963 Indian Malayalam-language film, directed by G. K. Ramu and produced by Kalyanakrishna Iyer. The film stars Prem Nazir, Sukumari, Adoor Bhasi and Thikkurissy Sukumaran Nair. The film had musical score by V. Dakshinamoorthy.

== Cast ==
- Prem Nazir
- Ragini
- Adoor Bhasi
- Thikkurissy Sukumaran Nair
- T. S. Muthaiah
- Adoor Pankajam
- Ambika
- Baby Vilasini
- Baby Vinodini
- Kumari Santha
- S. P. Pillai

== Soundtrack ==
All lyrics are written by Abhayadev; all music is composed by V. Dakshinamoorthy.

Track listing
No.	Title	Artist(s)	Length
1.	"Deva Ninniluracheedunna"	P. Leela
2.	"Doorennu Doorennu"	P. Leela
3.	"Kalaadevathe Saraswathy"	P. Leela, Kamukara Purushothaman
4.	"Kannane Kanden Sakhi"	P. Leela
5.	"Kasthoorithilakam"	Kamukara Purushothaman
6.	"Kettiyakaikondu"	P. Susheela
7.	"Maadhava Madhukai"	P. Leela
8.	"Maayaamayanude Leela"	Kamukara Purushothaman
9.	"Odivaava"	Kamukara Purushothaman
10.	"Paahi Mukunda"	P. Susheela, Kamukara Purushothaman
11.	"Poovinu Manamilla"	P. Leela, Kamukara Purushothaman
12.	"Priyamanasa Nee"	P. Leela
