= Kalpadukal =

Kaalpaadukal
- Poster
- Directed by: K. S. Antony
- Written by: K. S. Antony
- Screenplay by: K. S. Antony
- Produced by: T. R. Raghavan
- Starring: Prem Nazir; Sukumari; Nambiyathu; P. J. Antony
- Cinematography: E. N. C. Nair
- Edited by: K. D. George
- Music by: M. B. Sreenivasan
- Production company: Narayana Cine Productions Pvt. Ltd.
- Distributed by: Narayana Cine Productions Pvt. Ltd.
- Release date: 7 September 1962
- Country: India
- Language: Malayalam

Kalpadukal (English: Footprints) is a 1962 Malayalam-language film, written and directed by K. S. Antony, starring Prem Nazir in the lead role. The film received a certificate of merit at the National Film Awards. Renowned playback singer K. J. Yesudas sang his first song for this film.

== Awards ==
National Film Awards

- 1962: Certificate of Merit for the Second Best Feature Film in Malayalam

== Cast ==
- Prem Nazir
- Prem Nawas
- Ragini
- Aranmula Ponnamma
- Nellikode Bhaskaran
- P. J. Antony
- Paravoor Bharathan
- Adoor Pankajam
- Sukumari
- Thrissur Elsy
- Nambiyathu
- Vishnuprasad
- Thoppil Ravi
- S. N. Puram Kunchan
- Pulivalan Kochappan
- Kollam Sukumaran
- B. Krishna
- Vasumathi
- Thara
- Raphael
- Kalamandalam Bhanumathi
- Artist Nandan
- Sivasankaran
- U. C. K. Vadanappilli
- T. K. Shanthi
- Ponnara Vijayan
- Master Shanavas
- K. C. Rajasekharan
- K. P. Paul
- Johnson
- Sreedharan
- Parvathiyamma
- M. N. Damodaran
- Dharmaraj
- Antony Jose

== Soundtrack ==
The music was composed by M. B. Sreenivasan and lyrics were written by P. Bhaskaran, Kumaranasan, Sreenarayana Guru and Nambiyathu.

No.	Song	Singers	Lyrics	Length (m:ss)
1	"Attention Penne"	K. J. Yesudas, Santha P. Nair	P. Bhaskaran	
2	"Enthu Cheyyendethengottu"	P. Leela	Kumaranasan	
3	"Jaathibhedam"	K. J. Yesudas	Sreenarayana Guru	
4	"Karunaasaagara"	K. P. Udayabhanu, Kamala Kailas Nathan	Nambiyathu	
5	"Maalikamuttathe"	P. Leela	Nambiyathu	
6	"Nammude Pandathe"	K. P. Udayabhanu	P. Bhaskaran	
7	"Oru Jaathi Oru Matham" (Daivame Kaathukolkangu)	S. Janaki, K. P. Udayabhanu	Sreenarayana Guru	
8	"Panduthara Hindusthaanathil"	K. J. Yesudas, P. Leela, Anandavalli	Kumaranasan	
9	"Thaakin Thaararo"	S. Janaki, K. P. Udayabhanu, Anandavalli	P. Bhaskaran	
10	"Thevaazhithamburan"	K. P. Udayabhanu, Santha P. Nair	Nambiyathu	
