= Sthree (film) =

- Directed by: R. Velappan Nair
- Written by: Thikkurissy Sukumaran Nair
- Produced by: K. Parameswaran Pillai
- Starring: Thikkurissy Sukumaran Nair
- Music by: B. A. Chidambaranath
- Production company: Radhakrishna Films
- Release date: 1950
- Country: India
- Language: Malayalam

Sthree (transl. Woman) is a 1950 Malayalam-language film written by Thikkurissy Sukumaran Nair and directed by R. Velappan Nair.

== Cast ==
- Thikkurissy Sukumaran Nair as Rajan
- Vaikom M. P. Mani as Madhu
- Aravindaksha Menon as Vijayan
- Omalloor Chellamma as Sushama
- Radhadevi as Sudha
- Sumathi as Mallika
- Raman Nair as Mammadan
- Kuriyathi Neelakanta Pillai as Nanu Pillai
