= Bharya (1962 film) =

1962 film

- Directed by: Kunchacko
- Written by: Kanam E. J. Ponkunnam Varkey
- Produced by: M. Kunchacko
- Starring: Sathyan; Rajasree; Ragini; Kottayam Chellappan; S. P. Pillai; Manavalan Joseph; Nellikkodu Bhaskaran; Bahadoor; Adoor Pankajam
- Edited by: S. Williams
- Music by: G. Devarajan
- Distributed by: Udaya
- Release date: 20 December 1962
- Running time: 128 min
- Country: India
- Language: Malayalam

Bharya is a 1962 Malayalam language film starring Sathyan and Ragini in the lead roles. It was directed by Kunchacko based on a novel with the same title by Kanam EJ.

== Cast ==
- Sathyan as Benny
- Rajasree as Gracy
- Ragini as Leela
- Manavalan Joseph as Velayudhan
- Bahadoor as Mathan
- Nellikode Bhaskaran as Premsagar
- S. P. Pillai as Uthuppu
- Adoor Pankajam as Uthuppu's Wife
- Kottayam Chellappan
- Namboori Mathew
- Sadanandan
- Jijo
- R.Gopalakrishnan as Joey
- K. S. Gopinath
- Piravam Mary
- Baby Seetha

== Soundtrack ==
All lyrics are written by Vayalar Ramavarma; all music is composed by G. Devarajan

| No. | Title | Artist(s) | Length |
|---|---|---|---|
| 1. | "Aadam Aadam" | K. J. Yesudas, P. Susheela |
| 2. | "Dayaaparanaaya" | K. J. Yesudas |
| 3. | "Kaanaan Nalla Kinaavukal" | S. Janaki |
| 4. | "Lahari Lahari Lahari" | A. M. Rajah, Jikki |
| 5. | "Manassamatham Thannaatte" | A. M. Rajah, Jikki |
| 6. | "Mulkkireedamithenthinu" | P. Susheela |
| 7. | "Neelakkuruvee Neeyoru" |
| 8. | "Omanakkayyil" | P. Susheela |
| 9. | "Panchaarappaalumittaayi" | K. J. Yesudas, P. Leela, Renuka |
| 10. | "Periyaare" | P. Susheela, A. M. Rajah |
