= Omanakuttan =

1964 film by K. S. Sethumadhavan

Omanakkuttan
- Directed by: K. S. Sethumadhavan
- Written by: Thakazhi Sivasankara Pillai; Thoppil Bhasi (dialogues)
- Screenplay by: Thoppil Bhasi
- Produced by: P. K. Kaimal
- Starring: Sathyan; Sukumari; Thikkurissy Sukumaran Nair; Adoor Pankajam
- Cinematography: P. Ramaswami
- Music by: G. Devarajan
- Production company: Kerala Sree
- Distributed by: Thirumeni Pictures
- Release date: 8 October 1964
- Country: India
- Language: Malayalam

Omanakkuttan is a 1964 Indian Malayalam-language film, directed by K. S. Sethumadhavan and produced by P.K. Kaimal. The film stars Sathyan, Sukumari, Thikkurissy Sukumaran Nair and Adoor Pankajam. The film had musical score by G. Devarajan.

== Cast ==
- Sathyan
- Sukumari
- Thikkurissy Sukumaran Nair
- Adoor Pankajam
- Ambika
- Vinodini Sasimohan/Baby Vinodini
- Chandni
- Pankajavalli
- S. P. Pillai
- T. K. Balachandran

== Soundtrack ==
The music was composed by G. Devarajan with lyrics by Vayalar Ramavarma.

No.	Song	Singers	Lyrics	Length (m:ss)
1	"Aakashagangayude Karayil" (F)	P. Susheela	Vayalar Ramavarma	
2	"Aakashagangayude Karayil" (M)	A. M. Rajah	Vayalar Ramavarma	
3	"Ashtamirohini Raathriyil"	P. Susheela	Vayalar Ramavarma	
4	"Illathama Kulichu Varumbol"	P. Susheela, P. Leela	Vayalar Ramavarma	
5	"Kanikaanum Neram"	P. Leela, Renuka		
6	"Kuppivalakkaikalil"	A. P. Komala, Chorus	Vayalar Ramavarma	
7	"Oru Divasam"	P. Leela, K. P. Udayabhanu, Renuka	Vayalar Ramavarma	
8	"Thaaraattupadathe Thaalolam"	P. Susheela	Vayalar Ramavarma	
