= Aaryankavu Kollasangam =

- Directed by: R. Velappan Nair
- Written by: R. Velappan Nair; Kedamangalam Sadanandan (dialogues)
- Produced by: R. Velappan Nair
- Starring: Keralasree Sunny; Khadeeja; Polachira Ramachandran; Santo Krishnan
- Music by: B. A. Chidambaranath
- Release date: 27 February 1969
- Country: India
- Language: Malayalam

Aaryankavu Kollasangam is a 1969 Indian Malayalam-language film, directed and produced by R. Velappan Nair. The film stars Keralasree Sunny, Khadeeja, Polachira Ramachandran and Santo Krishnan. The film had musical score by B. A. Chidambaranath.

== Cast ==
- Keralasree Sunny
- Khadeeja
- Polachira Ramachandran
- Santo Krishnan
- Madhavan Nair

== Soundtrack ==
The music was composed by B. A. Chidambaranath and the lyrics were written by Kedamangalam Sadanandan.

No.	Song	Singers	Lyrics	Length (m:ss)
1	"Alayuvathenthinu"	C. O. Anto	Kedamangalam Sadanandan	
2	"Punchiri Thooki"	P. Leela	Kedamangalam Sadanandan	
