= Nithyakanyaka =

- Song-book cover
- Directed by: K. S. Sethumadhavan
- Written by: Sreedhar; Ponkunnam Varkey (dialogues)
- Produced by: A. K. Balasubramaniam
- Starring: Sathyan; Ragini; Thikkurissy Sukumaran Nair; Ambika
- Music by: G. Devarajan
- Production company: Saravanabhava Pictures
- Distributed by: Saravanabhava Pictures
- Release date: 22 February 1963
- Country: India
- Language: Malayalam

Nithyakanyaka is a 1963 Indian Malayalam-language film directed by K. S. Sethumadhavan and produced by A. K. Balasubramaniam. The film stars Sathyan, Ragini, Thikkurissy Sukumaran Nair and Ambika. The film had musical score by G. Devarajan. This film is based on Edhir Paradhathu (1954), directed by Chitrapu Narayana Rao.

== Cast ==
- Sathyan
- Ragini
- Thikkurissy Sukumaran Nair
- Ambika
- Bahadoor
- Kambissery Karunakaran
- Kottarakkara Sreedharan Nair
- Santo Krishnan

== Soundtrack ==
All lyrics are written by Vayalar Ramavarma; all music is composed by G. Devarajan.

No.	Title	Artist(s)	Length
1.	"Enthenthu Mohangal"	K. J. Yesudas, P. Susheela
2.	"Kannuneer Muthumaay" (Female)	P. Susheela
3.	"Kannuneer Muthumaay" (Male)	K. J. Yesudas
4.	"Kayyil Ninne Kittiyaal"	Pattom Sadan, T. S. Kumaresh
5.	"Krishna Guruvaayoorappa"	K. J. Yesudas
6.	"Marakkumo Enne"	K. J. Yesudas, P. Susheela
7.	"Thankam Kondoru"	P. Susheela
