= Vanchiyoor Radha =

Indian actress in Malayalam movies

- Born: Vanchiyoor
- Occupation: Actress
- Years active: 1966–1987
- Spouse: Narayana Pilla

Vanchiyoor Radha is an Indian actress in Malayalam movies. She was one of the prominent supporting actresses in late 1960s and 1970s in Malayalam movies. She has acted in more than 50 movies.

== Biography ==
She is born at Vanchiyoor, Thiruvananthapuram. She was a theater artist before becoming a cine artist. She debuted with the movie Vidhyarthikal in 1966 as Prem Nazir's sister. She is married to Narayana Pilla. The couple have two sons. She currently resides with her husband at Mahalingapuram, Chennai.

== Partial filmography ==
- Nishasurabhikal (2000)
- Shabdham Velicham (1990)
- Thoranam (1987)
- Nee Allenkil Njan (1987) as Balachandran' s mother
- Aval Kaathirunnu Avanum (1986)
- Pourusham (1983) as Achamma
- Marmaram (1982)
- Ruby My Darling (1982)
- Kilinjalgal (1981) - Tamil film
- Abhinayam (1981)
- Benz Vasu (1980)
- Theenalangal (1980)
- Ithikkarappakki (1980)
- Karipuranda Jeevithangal (1980)
- Deepam (1980) as Bhargavi
- Anthappuram (1980)
- Chandrahaasam (1980) as Elizabeth
- Avano Atho Avalo (1979) as Gawri's mother
- Vellaayani Paramu (1979) as Pathumma
- Lisa (1978)
- Kanyaka (1978) as Bivathu
- Sathrathil Oru Raathri (1978)
- Thamburatti (1978) as Rema's mother
- Ninakku Njaanum Enikku Neeyum (1978)
- Snehathinte Mukhangal (1978)
- Nivedyam (1978)
- Samudram (1977)
- Aparaajitha (1977)
- Ormakal Marikkumo (1977) as Teacher
- Yatheem (1977)
- Aval Oru Devaalayam (1977)
- Light House (1976) as Madhaviyamma
- Aalinganam (1976)
- Omanakkunju (1975)
- Veendum Prabhaatham (1973)
- Driksakshi (1973) as Doctor
- Azhakulla Saleena (1973)
- Kaalachakram (1973) as Subadra
- Udayam (1973) as Saramma teacher
- Chukku (1973)
- Panimudakku (1972)
- Maravil Thirivu Sookshikkuka (1972) as Valsamma
- Akkarappacha (1972)
- Puthrakameshti (1972)
- Ernakulam Junction (1971)
- Yogamullaval (1971)
- Vivahasammanam (1971) as Bhargavi
- Vithukal (1971) as Madhavi
- Vilaykku Vaangiya Veena (1971)
- Mindaapennu (1970) as Narayani
- Rahasyam (1969) as Santha
- Kattu Kurangu (1969)
- Viruthan Shanku (1968) as Kumudam
- Sreerama Pattabhishekam (1962) as Mallika
- Snehadeepam (1962) as Madhavi
