= Manavatty =

- Poster
- Directed by: K. S. Sethumadhavan
- Written by: Ashwathy Mathen; Raju Mathen (dialogues)
- Screenplay by: K. S. Sethumadhavan
- Produced by: Raju Mathen
- Starring: Sathyan; Madhu; Adoor Pankajam; Aranmula Ponnamma
- Cinematography: P. Ramaswami
- Edited by: N. Pokkalath
- Music by: G. Devarajan
- Release date: 10 April 1964
- Country: India
- Language: Malayalam

Manavatty is a 1964 Indian Malayalam-language film, directed by K. S. Sethumadhavan and produced by M. Raju Mathan. The film stars Sathyan, Madhu, Adoor Pankajam and Aranmula Ponnamma in the lead roles. The film had musical score by G. Devarajan.

== Cast ==
- Sathyan
- Ragini
- Madhu
- Baby Vinodini
- Adoor Pankajam
- Aranmula Ponnamma
- K. R. Vijaya
- S. P. Pillai
- T. N. Gopinathan Nair

== Soundtrack ==
The music was composed by G. Devarajan and the lyrics were written by Vayalar Ramavarma.

No.	Song	Singers	Lyrics	Length (m:ss)
1	"Ashtamudikkaayalile"	K. J. Yesudas, P. Leela	Vayalar Ramavarma	
2	"Chummaathiriyaliyaa"	A. L. Raghavan	Vayalar Ramavarma	
3	"Devathaaru Pootha"	A. M. Rajah	Vayalar Ramavarma	
4	"Idayakanyake"	K. J. Yesudas	Vayalar Ramavarma	
5	"Kaattile Kuyilin"	Renuka	Vayalar Ramavarma	
6	"Muthassikkadha"	P. Susheela	Vayalar Ramavarma	
7	"Neelavarnakkanpeelikal"	P. Susheela	Vayalar Ramavarma	
8	"Parakkum Thalikayil"	P. Susheela	Vayalar Ramavarma	

== Reception ==
The film was a box office success.
