= Kanam E. J. =

Malayalam writer (1926 - 1987)

Kanam EJ
- Born: Elavunkal Joseph Philip; 13 June 1926; Kanam, Kottayam district, Kingdom of Travancore, British India (now Kerala in India)
- Died: 13 June 1987 (aged 61)
- Occupation: writer

Elavunkal Joseph Philip (13 June 1926 – 13 June 1987), popularly known by his pen name Kanam EJ, was an Indian Malayalam language novelist, short story writer, and lyricist. Along with his contemporary, Muttathu Varkey, he was known for a genre of sentiment-filled romantic fiction known as painkili (janapriya) novel in Malayalam literature, written with the common man in mind. Philip started the well known Malayalam weekly Manorajyam and served as its editor.

== Early life and career ==
Philip was born on 13 June 1926 as the son of Joseph of the Elavunkal house in Kanam, a small village in Kottayam district of what is now the Indian state of Kerala. He attended MHSS Kangazha and passed Malayalam Higher. After schooling he joined military service. He returned to Kottayam after the military service and joined CMS Middle School Kanam, as a teacher. Later he served as Malayalam Pandit in CMS schools of Mundakayam, Kumpalampoika, Punnavely and Kottayam. Philip quit teaching and joined the popular Malayalam Weekly Malayala Manorama as a journalist. In 1967 he resigned from Malayala Manorama and started his own Malayalam Weekly called Manorajyam. He later sold it to George Thomas of Keraladwani.

=== Literary career ===
Kanam emerged as one of the popular writers of Malayalam fiction during the 1960s and 1970s. He mainly wrote social novels based on the Christian community of Kerala. He was a prolific writer and has written about 100 novels. Almost all of his novels were published in serial installments (Neendakatha) in Malayala Manorama Weekly. One of his novels, Bharya, was adapted into a Malayalam film with the same title. The 1962 film was directed by Kunchacko and starring Sathyan and Ragini. Kanam also wrote lyrics to few Malayalam films.

=== Death ===
Kanam died on his 61st birthday in 1987.

== Selected works ==
- Pampanathi Panjozhukunnu
- Ee Arayekkar Nintethanu
- Nee Bhoomiyude Uppakunnu
- Bharthavu
- Bharya
- Adhyapika
- Kaattumaram
