= Kannum Karalum =

- Directed by: K. S. Sethumadhavan
- Written by: K. T. Muhammed
- Produced by: A. K. Balasubramaniam
- Starring: Sathyan; Ambika Sukumaran; Sukumari; Kamal Haasan; Baby Vinodini
- Cinematography: P. Ramaswami
- Music by: M. B. Sreenivasan
- Production company: Saravanabhava Pictures
- Distributed by: Thirumeni Pictures
- Release date: 28 September 1962
- Country: India
- Language: Malayalam

Kannum Karalum (transl. Eyes and the Liver) is a 1962 Indian Malayalam-language film directed by K. S. Sethumadhavan, produced by A. K. Balasubramaniam under the banner of Saravanabhava Pictures. The film stars Sathyan, Ambika Sukumaran and Kamal Haasan, while Sukumari and debutant Vinodini play supporting roles. It was about a child Babu (Kamal Haasan) writing letters to his mother who he thought was in heaven.

Kannum Karalum was released on 28 September 1962. It was also a box office success and had a theatrical run of 100 days. The film was based on the story of K. T. Muhammed, who also wrote the script and dialogues. The music for the film was composed by M. B. Sreenivasan, with lyrics written by Vayalar Ramavarma.

== Cast ==
- Sathyan as Mohan
- Kamal Haasan as Babu
- Ambika Sukumaran as Sarala
- Muthukulam Raghavan Pillai as Gopalan Nair, Sarala's father.
- Baby Vinodini as Indira, (dual role child Babu and Indira)
- Sukumari
- S. P. Pillai

== Production ==
The film was based on the story of K. T. Muhammed, who also wrote the script and dialogues. This was the first Malayalam film of Kamal Haasan, he played Sathyan's son. It also debut Malayalm film of producer A. K. Balasubramaniam. Vinodini was a child artist when she did this film and she did a dual role as the teenaged Babu and Indira. The climax scenes of this film were shot on the top of the Sreenarayana Guru memorial at Varkala, Sivagiri.

== Soundtrack ==
The music was composed by M. B. Sreenivasan and lyrics were written by Vayalar Ramavarma. Latha Raju worked her second movie of this film as playback singer.

Song	Singers
"Aare Kaanaan Alayunnu"	K. J. Yesudas, Renuka
"Chenthaamarappoonthen"	Mehboob
"Kadaleevanathin"	P. Leela
"Kalimannu Menanju" (Happy)	P. Leela
"Kalimannu Menanju" (Sad)	P. Leela
"Thaatheyyam Kaattile"	Latha Raju
"Thirumizhiyaale"	P. Leela
"Valarnnu Valarnnu"	S. Janaki

== Release and reception ==
Each one of my films is different from the rest. My very second film in Malayalam Kannum Karalum (1962) was an experimental film. It was a film without a hero or a heroine and it received a big response. This film established me as a director of promise.

— K. S. Sethumadhavan in 1991

Kannum Karalum was released on 28 September 1962. The film was distributed by P. K. Kaimal under the banner of Thirumeni Pictures and the film was commercial success. The distributors who saw the film in Kochi predicted the film would not run successfully, as there was no romantic interest for the lead actor in it. Despite this, it ran for 100 days. Even in Palakkad, where Malayalam films never ran, it ran for 50 days. Jaycey Foundation chairman and film producer J.J. Kuttikkattu had conduct an event to celebrated the 50th anniversary of this film.
