= Kottayam Chellappan =

Indian actor

- Born: Chellappan C.R. 10 November 1923
- Died: 26 December 1971 (aged 48)
- Occupation: Film actor
- Years active: 1948 - 1971
- Spouse: Nalini Chellappan
- Children: Jyothi, Thampan, Kishore, Kala, Sheela, Maya and Charlie
- Parent(s): Poovelil Sanku and Kunjipennu

Kottayam Chellappan (10 November 1923 – 26 December 1971) was an Indian actor in Malayalam movies. He was also a renowned stage actor and film actor who was very active in Malayalam films during the 1960s and '70s. He died on 26 December 1971.

== Personal life ==
He was born as the third son among six children to Poovelil Sanku and Kunji Pennu on 10 November 1923 at Karapuzha, Kottayam. His brothers were the late Raghavan, Karunakaran, Sukumaran and his sisters were the late Sumathikutty and Padmavathi. He studied at MD High school, Kottayam. He studied till Intermediate level. He started his career as a stage artist and acted in dramas and stage shows across Kerala. He also tried producing films, thereafter he settling as a film actor. Thikkurissy Sukumaran Nair advised him to use his name titled with Kottayam. He died on 26 December 1971 due to a heart attack. He was 48. He is survived by his wife Nalini, four sons and three daughters. They are: Sri Jyothi, Late Shyam (Thampan), Kishore, Sreekala, Sheela (Moli), Maya and Charlie.

== Partial filmography ==
=== Actor ===
- Minnalppadayaali (1959)
- Unniyaarcha (1961)
- Mudiyanaaya Puthran (1961)
- Kandambecha Kottu (1961)
- Bhaarya (1962)
- Puthiya Aakaasham Puthiya Bhoomi (1962)
- Paalaattu Koman (Konkiyamma) (1962)
- Kadalamma (1963)
- Ammaye Kaanaan (1963)
- Doctor (1963)
- Rebecca (1963)
- Pazhassiraaja (1964)
- Anna (Old) (1964)
- Thacholi Othenan (1964) as Chindan Nambiar
- Chettathi (1965) as Viswanathan
- Jeevithayaathra (1965)
- Odayil Ninnu (1965)
- Kadathukaaran (1965)
- Sarpakadu (1965)
- Kuppivala (1965)
- Arakkillam (1967)
- Ramanan (1967)
- Chithramela (1967)
- Sheelaavathi (1967)
- Khadeeja (1967)
- Thalirukal (1967)
- Pengal (1968)
- Vidyaarthi (1968)
- Danger Biscuit (1969)
- Kuruthikkalam (1969)
- Kannoor Deluxe (1969)
- Mooladhanam (1969)
- Nilakkatha Chalanangal (1970)
- Thaara (1970)
- Ningalenne Communistakki (1970) as Keshavan Nair
- Pearl View (1970)
- Othenante Makan (1970) as Thekkumpattu Karanavar
- Abhayam (1970)
- Cross Belt (1970)
- Dathuputhran (1970)
- Agnimrigam (1971)
- Panchavan Kaadu (1971) as Arumukham Pilla
- Lora Nee Evide (1971)

=== Story ===
- Khadeeja (1967)
