= Ponkunnam Varkey =

Indian writer and activist

- Born: 1 July 1910; Edathua, Alleppey, Travancore
- Died: 2 July 2004 (aged 94); Pampady, Kottayam, Kerala, India
- Occupations: Writer, activist, teacher, freedom fighter
- Writing career
- Language: Malayalam
- Genres: Short story, play, screenplay, poem, essay
- Notable awards: Vallathol Award; 1994 Ezhuthachan Puraskaram; 1997; Lalithambika Sahitya Award; 2002 Muttathu Varkey Award; 2002

Ponkunnam Varkey (1 July 1910 – 2 July 2004) was a writer and activist from Kerala, India. Varkey was one of the pioneers of the progressive writers' forum and literary writers' co-operative in Kerala. He was the president of Kerala Sahitya Akademi and Sahithya Pravarthaka Co-operative Society.

== Biography ==
Varkey has said that his childhood was not a protected one, but based on the dictum of the survival of the fittest. While studying in school, he was attracted to the Indian independence movement, which became the theme of his early writings. After high school studies he passed the Malayalam 'Vidwaan' examination; the then prevalent qualifying test for language teachers and joined a Catholic school, near Ponkunnam. But his relationship with the management was unpleasant and he left the institution when he was appointed teacher at the Vernacular Middle School in Pampady in 1942. Soon he resigned this job and jumped into the freedom struggle and was imprisoned.

He was associated with the Communist Party for some time and was the secretary of Purogamana Kala Sahitya Sangham (progressive writers' forum) for five years.

He died on 2 July 2004, a day after his 94th birthday. His wife Claramma had died in 1991. They had four sons and three daughters.

== Literary career ==
Varkey entered the literary field in 1939 with Thirumulkazhcha, a collection of poems that got rave reviews from the stalwarts of the time. It won the award of the Madras government in 1939. Varkey soon changed his track and chose prose, finding that drama and short story were the most effective vehicles to bring the written word close to the spoken one. He was already in the vortex of the great churning that was taking place in Kerala's social arena; he used his literary prowess to launch an uncompromising struggle against social injustice. This brought him in direct conflict with the then Diwan. His short stories Manthrikkettu and Model were banned in 1946 by the government of the princely state of Travancore (now forming southern Kerala) on the charge of treason and Varkey was imprisoned for six months.

In 1944, Varkey started the National Book Stall, with the support of people like D. C. Kizhakemuri. But the venture was a total failure; after a few years, it merged with the Sahithya Pravarthaka Co-operative Society (SPCS), world's first writer's publishing cooperative and Varkey functioned as its president.

Varkey has published 24 volumes of short stories, 16 volumes of plays, two collection of poems one collection of essays (profiles of some politicians and public figures) and a volume of autobiography. His short story Sabdikkunna Kalappa has always been considered one of the best short stories in Malayalam literature. It describes the close relationship between a farmer and his ox.

The recurrent themes of Varkey's writings are the decadence in the echelons of power and the corruption among the clergy. His style is direct, simple and unostentatious and the characters of his stories are ordinary rural folk, mostly farmers and workers. The focus of his works was on human relationships and man's relationship with nature. Varkey's writing expedited the evolution of a congenial atmosphere for social change in the first half of the 20th century in India.

In 1973 Varkey was nominated as the president of Kerala Sahitya Akademi. In 1997, Ezhuthachan Puraskaram, the highest literary honour of the Kerala government was awarded to Varkey.

== Film career ==
He wrote screenplays for several films and produced two films. His entry into the film industry was through Navalokam, for which he penned the story and dialogue. The screenplay was heavily loaded with pro-labour dialogues and the film received heavy cuts from the Censor Board. He also worked for films like Asha Deepom, Snehaseema, Bharya, Vidhithanna Vilakku, School Master and many others. He also produced two films – Makam Piranna Manka and Chalanam. Varkey was an honorary member of Malayalam Cine Technicians' Association (MACTA).

== Major works ==
=== Short stories ===
- Kunakiriyam
- Aniyara
- Anthithiri
- Veliyil Enikku Sthalamilla
- Nivedanam
- Idivandi'ailil ninnu
- model
- Ezhakal
- Pottiya Izhakal
- Nattuvelicham
- Daham
- Daivathekkal Njan pedikkunnathu
- Hridayanadam
- Sabdikkunna Kalappa
- Democracy

=== Plays ===
- Kathirukanakkili
- Bharthavu
- Jethakkal
- Premaviplavam
- Swargam Nanikunnu
- Pooja
- Njan oradhikappattanu
- Vazhi Thurannu
- Visarikku Kattu Venda
- Karnan
- Manushya
- Althara
- Irumpumara
- Chalanam
- Thrumulkazhcha (Poetry)
- Neeravi
- Ente Vazhithirivu (Autobiography)
