= K. P. Udayabhanu =

- Born: Bhanuprakash; 6 June 1936; Tharoor, Malabar District, Madras Presidency, British India (present day Palakkad, Kerala, India)
- Died: 5 January 2014 (aged 77) Thiruvananthapuram, Kerala, India
- Occupations: Playback singer; Music composer
- Years active: 1958 – 2010

Kizhakke Potta Udayabhanu (born Bhanuprakash; 6 June 1936 – 5 January 2014) was an Indian playback singer and music director, mainly in Malayalam films. In 2009, he was awarded the Padma Shri, India's fourth highest civilian honour.

He represented India at the 1985 ABU Popular Song Contest.

== Personal life ==
Udayabhanu was born to N. S. Varma and Ammu Nethyaramma at Tharur in the present-day Palakkad district. Udayabhanu got his family name, Kizhakke Potta, through matrilineal succession. His maternal uncles are music scholar K. P. Appukutta Menon and freedom fighter K. P. Kesava Menon.

Udayabhanu spent his childhood in Singapore, where his father ran a business. Following his mother's death, he returned to India at the age of seven. Udayabhanu joined the Thyagaraja Sangeetha Vidyalaya in Kalpathy and started learning music under the guidance of Erode Viswanatha Iyer, Palghat Mani Iyer, M. D. Ramanathan, Palghat Srirama Bhagavathar, and Flute Krishna Iyer. Udayabhanu married singer Vijayalekshmi in 1970 and they had a son, Rajeev Udayabhanu. Vijayalekshmi died in 2007.

Udayabhanu started his career as an announcer in All India Radio in 1956, where he worked for 38 years. In 1964–65, he worked as a music teacher at Lawrence School, Lovedale, but quit it in 1965 and rejoined All India Radio in the same year. He was also the public relations officer to K. Karunakaran twice.

His favourite singers were K. J. Yesudas and K. S. Chithra. M. Balamuralikrishna was his favourite Carnatic musician. Bade Gulam Ali Khan and Bhimsen Joshi were his favourite Hindustani musicians.

Udayabhanu died on 5 January 2014 at his home in Thiruvananthapuram. He was suffering from Parkinson's disease. Aparna Balamurali, a popular young actress and singer, is his grandniece, being the daughter of his nephew Balamurali, who is himself a professional musician.

== Career ==
Udayabhanu recorded his first film song Enthinithra panchasara for the film Nairu Pidicha Pulivalu in 1958. In his career, he sang more than 50 songs. The most notable songs are Kananachayayil aadumeykkan (Ramanan), Anuraga nadakathin (Ninamaninja Kalpadukal), Ponvalayillenkilum (Kutti Kuppayam), Thamara Thumbi Vava (Puthiya Akasam Puthiya Bhoomi), Vellinakshathrame ninne nokki (Ramanan), Chudukanneeralen (Laila Majnu), Tharame tharame (Laila Majnu), Vadaruthee malarini (Sathyabhama), Pennale pennale (Chemmeen), Pennayi pirannenkil, Viralonnillenkilum (Veluthambi Dalawa), and Velutha penne velutha penne (Nairu Pidicha Pulivalu). His last song was Kaatu Paranjathum recorded for the 2010 film Thanthonni. He sang this song after a break of 40 years from his last recorded film song. He composed music for the films Samasya, Velichamillatha Veedhi, and Mayilpeeli. The songs Kili chilachu from Samasya and Indu sundarasmitham thookum from Mayil Peeli and several light music hits were broadcast through All India Radio and were highly popular.

In 1984, Udayabhanu launched the musical troupe Old is Gold which has conducted several stage shows in India and abroad. Udayabhanu represented India at the Asia Pacific Popular Song contest in Singapore in 1985. He was also the chief conductor of the Drums of India music programme which was organised as part of the Republic Day celebrations in 1985. He was the chief conductor and composer of Bharatiyam conducted in Thiruvananthapuram. He conducted choral groups in all Indian languages from Delhi Central Production Unit and Delhi Doordarshan. He composed 32 poems by renowned Kerala poets in connection with the Golden Jubilee celebrations of Independence. He conducted music for more than 100 patriotic songs. Of these, more than 80 were in Malayalam. The rest were in Tamil, Telugu, Kannada, Hindi, Bengali, Gujarati, Punjabi, Assamese, Sindhi, Kashmiri, Marathi, and Oriya.

According to Malayalam film historian Balagopal, Udayabhanu's voice was specially suited for sad songs in melodramatic films of the 1960s and 1970s.

== Awards and recognitions ==
- Recipient of Padma Shri Award, 2009.
- Sangeet Natak Akademi Award for creative music, 2002.
- Kerala Sangeetha Nataka Akademi Fellowship, 2004.
- Kamukara award, 2006.
- B. R. Ambedkar "Kalasri" Award by Bharatheeya Dalit Sahitya Akademi, New Delhi, 2003.
- National Film Award for Best Non-Feature Film Music Direction, 1994 (Myth of the Tree, Serpant Mother).
- Honoured by Kerala government for outstanding contributions to Malayalam film industry, 1981.
- Kerala Sangeetha Nataka Akademi Award, 1987.
- Honoured by All India Radio for outstanding contributions to broadcasting in Kerala, 1999.

== Positions held ==
- Member- Kerala Sangeetha Nataka Akademi
- Member- Kerala Kalamandalam
- Member- Board of Studies (Music), Calicut University
- Member- Board of Studies (Music), Mahatma Gandhi University
- Member- Film Censor Board (thrice)
- Member- Kerala State Film Awards Committee (thrice)
- Member- Audition Board, All India Radio
