= M. S. Mani (film editor) =

Indian film director and film editor

- Born: Thiruvananthapuram
- Occupations: Film editor and film director
- Years active: 1949–2003
- Spouse: Seethamani
- Children: Karthik

M. S. Mani (1926–2008) was an Indian film director and film editor of Malayalam movies. He won National award twice in 1990 and 1992 for editing the films Iyyer The Great and Sargam and Kerala State Award in 1972 for editing. He joined the film industry in 1948 and his first film was Ashaadeepam. He has edited more than 300 movies. His famous works as editor includes Kathapurushan, Vidheyan, Sargam, Oru Vadakkan Veeragatha, Anantharam and Amritham Gamaya all that went noticed at the national level. He also edited many Hindi and Tamil films. He also directed seven films, including Doctor, Sathyabhama, Subaida, Thalirukal, Vilakkapatta Bandhangal and Jalakannyaka. He was a popular Malayalam movie director during 1980s.

== Personal life ==
He hails from Poojapura in Thiruvananthapuram. He was born in November 1926 to Mrithyunjaya Ayyar and Balambal. He died on 9 March 2008 at the Sree Ramachandra Hospital in Chennai, following heart diseases. He was 81 and is survived by wife Seethamani and only son, Karthik.

== Awards ==
National Film Awards

- 1990 – National Film Award for Best Editing for Iyer the Great
- 1992 – National Film Award for Best Editing for Sargam

Kerala State Film Awards

- 1972 – Kerala State Film Award for Best Editor for Maram

== Partial filmography ==
=== Editor ===
- Aashadeepam (1953)
- Snehaseema (1954)
- Koodappirappu (1956)
- Nairu Pidicha Pulivaalu (1958)
- Chathurangam (1959)
- Jnaanasundari (1961)
- Viyarppinte Vila (1962)
- Puthiya Aakaasham Puthiya Bhoomi (1962)
- Doctor (1963)
- Sathyabhaama (1963)
- Oru Vadakkan Veeragatha 91989)
- Panjagni (1986)
- Nakhashathangal (1996)
- O Faby (1992)
- Evideyo Oru Shathru (1983)
- Varanmaare Aavashyamundu (1983)
- Poomadathe Pennu (1984)
- Vellam (1984)
- Vikatakavi (1984)
- Anjaam Hindi (1986)
- Amrutham Gamaya (1987)
- Mangai Oru Gangai (Tamil) (1987)
- Aranyakam (1988)
- Oliyambukal (1990)
- Pavakoothu (1990)
- Sargam (1992)
- Parinayam (1994)
- Ennu Swantham Janakikutty (1998)
- Prem Poojari (1999)

=== Direction ===
- Puthiya Aakaasham Puthiya Bhoomi (1962)
- Doctor (1963)
- Sathyabhaama (1963)
- Subaida (1965)
- Thalirukal (1967)
- Vilakkappetta Bandhangal (1969)
- Jalakanyaka (1971)
