= Ragini (actress) =

Indian actress

- Born: Ragini; 27 March 1937; Trivandrum, Kingdom of Travancore
- Died: 30 December 1976 (aged 39); Thiruvananthapuram, Kerala
- Children: Lakshmi; Priya
- Parent(s): Thangappan Pillai; Saraswathi Amma
- Relatives: Shobana (niece); Ambika Sukumaran; Vineeth (nephew); Krishna (grandnephew)
- Family: Lalitha (sister); Padmini (sister)

Ragini (27 March 1937 – 14 December 1976) was an Indian actress and dancer. She was the youngest of the Travancore Sisters; Lalitha, Padmini and Ragini. She started her acting career in the mid-1950s along with her sister Padmini and acted in movies of different Indian languages, including Malayalam, Hindi, Tamil and Telugu. She also starred opposite Shammi Kapoor in the Hindi film Mujrim (1958). She played the role of Parvati opposite Trilok Kapoor who played Shiva in the 1962 film Shiv Parvati. The era of dance in Hindi cinema is considered to have begun with the entrance of Ragini and other South Indian actresses. Ragini died of breast cancer in 1976. She had acted in many dramas also.

== Family ==
She was married to Madhavan Thampi. The couple had two daughters, Lakshmi and Priya. Actress Sukumari was the trio's maternal first cousin. Malayalam actors Shobana, Ambika Sukumaran, Vineeth and Krishna are her relatives. Her husband left for the US in 1972, but returned after his wife was diagnosed with cancer.

== Partial filmography ==
=== Bengali ===
Year	Film	Role	Notes
1959	Nrityeri Tale Tale		Lone Bengali film

=== Malayalam ===
- Prasanna (1950)
- Chandrika (1950)
- Ponkathir (1953)
- Minnunnathellam Ponnalla (1957) as Dancer
- Thaskaraveeran (1957) as Shobha
- Nairu Pidicha Pulivalu (1958) as Thankam
- Krishna Kuchela (1961) as Rukmini
- Ummini Thanka (1961) as Anandam
- Sabarimala Ayyappan (1961) as Mahishi
- Unniyarcha (1961) as Unniyarcha
- Puthiya Akasam Puthiya Bhoomi (1962) as Ponnamma
- Palattu Koman (1962) as Unniyamma
- Veluthambi Dalawa (1962) as Jagadambika
- Vidhi Thanna Vilakku (1962) as Bhavani
- Kaalpadukal (1962) as Chandalabishuki
- Viyarppinte Vila (1962) as Omana
- Bharya (1962) as Leela
- Nithya Kanyaka (1963) as Latha
- Chilamboli (1963) as Chinthamani
- Kalayum Kaminiyum (1963) as Usha
- Atom Bomb (1964) as Sushamma
- Anna (1964) as Anna
- School Master (1964) as Sarala
- Manavatty (1964) as Susi
- Saraswathi (1967) as Saraswathi
- Ammayenna Sthree (1970) as Bhanu
- Sabarimala Sree Dharmashastha (1970)
- Othenente Makan (1970) as Kunji
- Thurakkatha Vathil (1970) as Sulekha
- Aranazhikaneram (1970) as Deenamma
- Achante Bharya (1971) as Thankamma
- Ganga Sangamam (1971) as Philomina/Mini
- Muthassi (1971) as Mary
- Poompatta (1971) as Susheela
- Panchavan Kaadu (1971) as Unniyamma
- Lanka Dahanam (1971) as Maheswari
- Ernakulam Junction (1971) as Malathi
- Naadan Premam (1972)
- Aromalunni (1972) as Unniyarcha
- Lakshyam (1972) as Anna
- Thottilla (1972)
- Aalinganam (1976) as Vimala
- Prem Nazirine Kanmanilla (1983) as Archive footage
- Nokkethadhoorathu Kannum Nattu (1984) as Manikutty (photo appearance)

=== Hindi ===
Year	Film	Role	Notes
1956	Naya Admi		
1957	Qaidi		
1957	Beti		
1957	Payal	Indira	
1957	Mr. X	Ragini	
1958	Sitamgar		
1958	Mujrim	Uma	
1958	Amar Deep	Champa	
1959	Amar Shaheed		
1960	Kalpana	Asha	
1960	Aai Phirse Bahar		
1962	Shiv Parvati	Parvati Devi	
1963	Shikari	Rita	Lead Role
1963	Kinare Kinare	Bharatanatyam Dancer	Uncredited
1963	Naag Rani	Princess Anjana	
1963	Gehra Daag	Dancer / Singer	
1963	Yeh Dil Kisko Doon	Sherry	
1964	Awara Badal	Aarti	
1965	Aadhi Raat Ke Baad	Ragini	
1976	Jai Jagat Janani		

=== Sinhala ===
Year	Film	Role	Notes
1958	Suneetha		Choreography also
1956	Surathali		

=== Tamil ===
- Manthiri Kumari (1950)
- Ezhai Padum Padu (1950)
- Chandrika (1950)
- Vanasundari (1951)
- Singari (1951)
- Devaki (1951)
- Andhaman Kaidhi (1952)
- Mappilai (1952)
- Ponni (1953)
- Marumagal (1953)
- Manithan (1953)
- Vaira Malai (1954)
- Kalyanam Panniyum Brammachari (1954) as Savithri
- Thooku Thooki (1954) as Mallika
- Koondukkili (1954)
- Menaka (1955)
- Mangaiyar Thilakam (1955) as Neela
- Ellam Inba Mayam (1955) as Bhanu
- Gomathiyin Kaadhalan (1955)
- Kaveri (1955) as Kurathi
- Koteeswaran (1955) as Kamala
- Shiv Bhakta (1955) as Chinthamani
- Madurai Veeran (1956)
- Pennin Perumai (1956)
- Verum Pechu Alla (1956)
- Baagyavathi (1957) as Suguna
- Manamagan Thevai (1957)
- Karpukkarasi (1957)
- Chakravarthi Thirumagal (1957)
- Mangalya Bhagyam (1958)
- Neelavukku Neranja Manasu (1958)
- Uthama Puthiran (1958) as Rajathi
- Ponnu Vilayum Bhoomi (1959)
- Nalla Theerpu (1959)
- Pandithevan (1959)
- Deivame Thunai (1959)
- Kalyanikku Kalyanam (1959) as Bharatham Pattammal
- Veerapandiya Kattabomman (1959) as Sundaravadivu
- Raja Desingu (1960)
- Irumanam Kalanthal Thirumanam (1960)
- Mannadhi Mannan (1960) as Dancer at festival
- Parthiban Kanavu (1960) as Valli
- Baghdad Thirudan (1960)
- Punar Jenmam (1961) as Pushpa
- Sri Valli (1961) as Valli's friend
- Senthamarai (1962)
- Raani Samyuktha (1962) as Amarawathi
- Vikramdhithan (1962)
- Kavitha (1962)
- Ezhai Pangalan (1963)
- Parisu (1963) as Shanthi
- Naan Vanangum Dheivam (1963) as Kalaivani
- Chitor Rani Padmini (1963)
- Aayiram Roobai (1964)
- Navagraham (1970) as Akhilandam
- Ethirkalam (1970)
- Aathi Parasakthi (1971) as A British Woman
- Raman Thediya Seethai (1972) as Actress/Dancer of the play
- Poove Poochooda Vaa (1985) as Alamelu (Photo only)

=== Telugu ===
Year	Film	Role	Notes
1950	Beedala Patlu	Dancer	
1955	Santosham	Dancer	
1956	Charana Daasi	Dancer	
1957	Varudu Kavali	Dancer	
1961	Taxi Ramudu	Mohini	
