= Silk Smitha filmography =

Vijayalakshmi Vadlapati (2 December 1960 – 23 September 1996), better known by her stage name Silk Smitha, was an Indian actress who worked predominantly in various Indian films. She appeared in about 360 films in Tamil, Telugu, Kannada, Hindi and Malayalam languages. In 1983, she made the world record for appearing in the highest number of films released in a single year.

== Filmography ==
Year	Film	Role	Language	Notes
1979	Ottapettavar		Malayalam	
1980	Pushyaraagam		Malayalam	
1980	Saraswatheeyaamam	Padmam	Malayalam	
1980	Rajaneegandhi	Sheela	Malayalam	
1980	Ivar	Susamma	Malayalam	
1980	Karimbana	Palamma	Malayalam	
1980	Angadi	Sainabha	Malayalam	
1980	Bhola Shankarudu		Telugu	
1980	Vandichakkaram	Silk as bar girl	Tamil	
1981	Vayal	Parvathi	Malayalam	
1981	Sneham Oru Pravaaham		Malayalam	
1981	Seethakoka Chiluka	David's wife	Telugu	
1981	Gharana Gangulu		Telugu	
1981	Pinneyum Pookkunna Kaadu		Malayalam	
1981	Inaye Thedi		Malayalam	
1981	Alaigal Oivathillai	Elissy	Tamil	
1981	Avatharam	Thankamani	Malayalam	
1981	Poochasanyasi		Malayalam	
1981	Nizhal Yudham		Malayalam	
1981	Needhi Pizhaithathu		Tamil	
1981	Koyil Puraa	Baby	Tamil	
1982	Moondram Pirai	Headmaster's wife	Tamil	
1982	Ranga	Ravi's girlfriend	Tamil	
1982	Neram Vandhachu	Rekha	Tamil	
1982	Sagalakala Vallavan	Lalitha	Tamil	
1982	Theeradha Vilaiyattu Pillai	Mohan's wife	Tamil	
1982	Moondru Mugam	Asha	Tamil	
1982	Yamakinkarudu		Telugu	
1982	Paritchaikku Neramaachu		Tamil	
1982	Thanikattu Raja	Special appearance	Tamil	
1982	Pattanathu Rajakkal	Rekha	Tamil	
1982	Nandri Meendum Varuga		Tamil	
1982	Lottery Ticket		Tamil	
1982	Kozhi Koovuthu	Chittu	Tamil	
1982	Adhisayappiravigal	Rani	Tamil	
1982	Naa Desam		Telugu	
1982	Idiyum Minnalum	Smitha	Malayalam	
1982	Parvaiyin Marupakkam	Anitha	Tamil	
1982	Theerpu		Tamil	
1982	Sivantha Kankal		Tamil	
1982	Kaalan		Malayalam	
1982	Boom Boom Madu		Tamil	
1982	Nadodiraja		Tamil	
1983	Thudikkum Karangal	Seetha	Tamil	
1983	Imaigal		Tamil	
1983	Sattam		Tamil	
1983	Jaani Dost	Laila	Hindi	
1983	Jeet Hamaari	Soni	Hindi	
1983	Tarzan Sundari		Telugu	
1983	Sadma	Soni	Hindi	
1983	Roshagadu		Telugu	
1983	Puli Debba	Nalini	Telugu	
1983	Khaidi	Item Number	Telugu	
1983	Vellai Roja	Guest Role	Tamil	
1983	Theeram Thedunna Thira	Smitha	Malayalam	
1983	Soorakottai Singakutti	Sokki	Tamil	Female Lead
1983	Silk Silk Silk	Priya/Meena/Sheela (Triple Role)	Tamil	Female Lead
1983	Rathilayam	Rathi	Malayalam	
1983	Prathigna	Dancer	Malayalam	
1983	Kokkarako		Tamil	Female Lead
1983	Justice Raja	Item dancer	Malayalam	
1983	Gedda Maga		Kannada	
1983	Eettappuli	Rani	Malayalam	
1983	Attakkalasam		Malayalam	
1983	Adutha Varisu	Usha	Tamil	
1983	Sivappu Sooriyan	Rani	Tamil	
1983	Paayum Puli	Roopa	Tamil	
1983	Thai Veedu		Tamil	
1983	Malaioor Mambattiyan		Tamil	
1983	Thambathigal		Tamil	
1983	Bhagavathipuram Railway Gate		Tamil	
1983	Nizhal Moodiya Nirangal		Malayalam	
1983	Sumangali	Lakshmi	Tamil	
1983	Aayiram Nilave Vaa		Tamil	
1983	Pankayam		Malayalam	
1983	Vaashi		Malayalam	
1983	Snehabandham		Malayalam	
1983	Thanga Magan	Rekha	Tamil	
1983	Jothi		Tamil	
1983	Uruvangal Maralam		Tamil	
1983	Neethibathi	Item Dancer	Tamil	
1983	Urangatha Ninaivugal		Tamil	
1983	Sampoorna Premayanam	Item Number	Telugu	
1983	Gudachari No.1	Item Number	Telugu	
1983	Adavi Simhalu	Item Number	Telugu	
1983	Ennai Paar En Azhagai Paar		Tamil	
1983	Naan Unna Nenachen		Tamil	
1983	Antha Sila Naatkal		Tamil	
1984	Vaazhkai	Swapna	Tamil	
1984	Taqatwala		Hindi	
1984	Allullostunnaru		Hindi	
1984	Goonda	Mohini	Telugu	
1984	Qaidi	Dancer in song Bongo Bongo	Hindi	
1984	Challenge	Priyamvada	Telugu	
1984	Rustum		Telugu	
1984	Yuddham		Telugu	
1984	Tharaasu	Item number	Tamil	
1984	Kairasikkaran	Aisha	Tamil	
1984	Iru Methaigal		Tamil	
1984	Idavelakku Sesham	Dolly	Malayalam	
1984	Bullet	Shobha	Malayalam	
1984	Alakadalinakkare	Dancer	Malayalam	
1984	Naanayam Illatha Naanayam	Dancer	Tamil	
1984	Abhimanyudu		Telugu	
1984	S. P. Bhayankar		Telugu	
1984	Hero		Telugu	
1984	Agni Gundam		Telugu	
1984	Aada Puli		Telugu	
1984	Raraju		Telugu	
1984	Bhola Shankarudu		Telugu	
1984	Bangaru Kapuram	Mohini/Moham	Telugu	
1984	Seethamma Pelli		Telugu	
1984	Neengal Kettavai	Ravi's Girlfriend	Tamil	
1984	Prachanda Kulla	Item Number	Kannada	
1984	Niraparaadhi		Malayalam	
1984	Umanilayam	Reena	Malayalam	
1984	Sattathai Thiruthungal		Tamil	
1984	Vellai Pura Ondru		Tamil	
1984	Neram Nalla Neram		Tamil	
1985	Santhosha Kanavukal		Tamil	
1985	Pataal Bhairavi	Dancer	Hindi	
1985	Jwala		Telugu	
1985	Bebbuli Veta		Telugu	
1985	Maya Mohini		Telugu	
1985	Vajrayudham		Telugu	
1985	Dongallo Dora		Telugu	
1985	Darja Donga		Telugu	
1985	Puli		Tamil	
1985	Visha Kanya	Nagini	Telugu	
1985	Terror		Telugu	
1985	Ranarangam		Telugu	
1985	Punnami Ratri	Manjula	Telugu	
1985	Mayaladi	Roja and Inspector Sujatha	Telugu	Double Role
1985	Illaliko Pareeksha		Telugu	
1985	Shri Datta Darshanam		Telugu	
1985	Aatma Balam		Telugu	
1985	Revenge	Geetha	Malayalam	
1985	Ottayan	Rani	Malayalam	
1985	Moodila Muchata		Telugu	
1985	Lady James Bond	Female Lead	Telugu	
1985	Paripoyina Khaideelu	Female Lead	Telugu	
1985	Kumkuma Thanda Saubhagya	Item Number	Kannada	
1985	Kiratham	Dancer	Malayalam	
1985	Chorakku Chora	C.I.D Silk	Malayalam	
1985	Jeevante Jeevan		Malayalam	
1985	Prathikarajwaala		Malayalam	
1985	Chattamtho Poratam		Telugu	
1985	Donga		Telugu	
1985	Kattula Kondayya	Item dancer	Telugu	
1985	Tirugubatu		Telugu	
1986	Izzat Aabroo		Hindi	
1986	Khaidi Rudraiah		Hindi	
1986	Kirathakudu	Hamsa	Telugu	
1986	Urukku Manushyan		Malayalam	
1986	Kulambadikal		Malayalam	
1986	Kaithi Rani	Rani	Telugu	
1986	Kutra		Telugu	
1986	Punnami Rathri		Telugu	
1986	Rakshasudu		Telugu	
1986	Papikondalu		Telugu	
1986	Kondaveeti Raja		Telugu	
1986	Nippulanti Manishi	Item dancer	Telugu	
1986	Annoru Raavil		Malayalam	
1986	Pensimham		Malayalam	
1986	Tiger	Item Number	Kannada	
1986	Engal Thaikulame Varuga		Tamil	
1987	Hanthakudi Veta		Telugu	
1987	Swatantraniki Oopiri Poyandi	Female Lead	Telugu	
1987	Veera Viharam	Female Lead	Telugu	
1987	Sthree Sahasam	Female Lead	Telugu	
1987	Dayamayudu		Telugu	
1987	Penn Simham	Reshma	Malayalam	
1987	Alludu Kosam		Telugu	
1987	Anjatha Singam		Tamil	
1987	Aalappirandhavan		Tamil	
1987	Cooliekkaran	Guest Role	Tamil	
1988	Gumrah Jawani		Hindi	
1988	Khaidi No.786	Item Number	Telugu	
1988	Ukku Sankellu		Telugu	
1988	Vegu Chukka Pagati Chukka		Telugu	
1988	Jeeva	Monika	Tamil	
1988	Poovukkul Boogambam		Tamil	
1988	Ganam Courtar Avargale	Client	Tamil	
1988	Shenbagamae Shenbagamae		Tamil	
1988	Paatti Sollai Thattathe	Anushiya	Tamil	
1988	Dhayam Onnu		Tamil	
1988	Raaga Thalangal		Tamil	
1988	Poovukkul Boogambam		Tamil	
1989	Kameena Kahin Kaa		Hindi	
1989	Geethanjali	Guest appearance in song	Telugu	
1989	Adharvam	Ponni	Malayalam	
1989	Sonthakkaran	Sudha	Tamil	
1989	Thiruppu Munai		Tamil	
1989	Pick Pocket		Tamil	
1989	New Year	Daisy	Malayalam	
1989	Miss Pameela		Malayalam	
1989	Layanam		Malayalam	
1989	Andru Peytha Mazhaiyil	Capri	Tamil	
1989	Praayapoorthiyaayavarkku Maathram		Malayalam	
1989	Padippura		Malayalam	
1989	VIP		Malayalam	
1989	Preminchi Choodu	Sudha	Tamil	
1989	Bamma Maata Bangaru Baata	Anasuya	Telugu	
1989	Agni		Telugu	
1989	Parthudu	Dancer	Telugu	
1989	Ayyappa Swamy Mahatyam		Telugu	
1989	Police Report		Telugu	
1990	Pyasi Meri Nigahen		Hindi	
1990	Avasara Police 100	Amulu	Tamil	
1990	Gulabi Raaten	Advocate / Judge Sheela Mathur	Hindi	
1990	Adhisaya Manithan	Nancy	Tamil	
1990	Shesham Screenil		Malayalam	
1990	Naale Ennundekil	Jyothi	Malayalam	
1990	Neengalum Herothan		Tamil	
1990	Sunday 7 PM	Sherly	Malayalam	
1991	Vikram		Hindi	
1991	Doosri Biwi		Hindi	
1991	Mugguru Attala Muddula Alludu		Telugu	
1991	Chaitanya	Smitha	Telugu	
1991	Aditya 369	Rajanarthaki Nandini	Telugu	
1991	Idhayam		Tamil	
1991	Thambikku Oru Paattu		Tamil	
1991	Srisaila Bhramarambika Kataksham		Telugu	
1991	Thalattu Ketkuthamma	Dr. Mary	Tamil	
1991	Onnum Theriyatha Pappa		Tamil	
1992	Mera Farz Mera Karz		Hindi	
1992	Pandithurai	Sinthamani	Tamil	
1992	Drohi	Dancer	Hindi	Uncredited
1992	Thai Mozhi	Girlfriend	Tamil	
1992	Rishi		Malayalam	
1992	Pangali	Item number	Tamil	
1992	Naadody	Item dancer	Malayalam	
1992	Halli Meshtru		Kannada	
1992	Amaran	Area Girl	Tamil	
1992	Deiva Kuzhanthai	Kuyilu	Tamil	
1992	Kizhakku Veluthachu	Alamelu	Tamil	
1992	David Uncle	Singari	Tamil	
1992	Vasudha		Malayalam	
1992	Chevalier Michael		Malayalam	
1992	Antham	Bar dancer	Telugu	
1992	Subba Rayudi Pelli		Telugu	
1992	Chillara Mogudu Allari Koduku		Telugu	
1992	Hosa Kalla Hale Kulla		Kannada	
1993	Rakshana		Telugu	
1993	Govindha Govindha	Guest Appearance in song	Telugu	
1993	Chinna Alludu	Item Number	Telugu	
1993	Aarambham	Item Number	Telugu	
1993	Sabash Babu	Cameo	Tamil	
1993	Ulle Veliye		Tamil	
1993	Kongu Chatu Krishnudu	Item Number	Telugu	
1993	Rajadhi Raja Raja Kulothunga Raja; Marthanda Raja Gambeera; Kathavaraya Krishna Kamarajan		Tamil	
1993	Kunthi Puthrudu	Item Number	Telugu	
1993	Nallathe Nadakkum	Ramadevi	Tamil	
1993	Moondravadhu Kann	Item dancer	Tamil	
1993	Bava Bavamaridi	Chintamani	Telugu	
1993	Saakshaal Sreeman Chaatthunni	Herself special appearance in song	Malayalam	
1993	Mafia	Item Dance	Malayalam	
1993	Aadhityan	Manga	Tamil	
1993	Alimayya		Kannada	
1993	Muta Mestri	Item Number	Telugu	
1993	Rowdy Annayya	Item Number	Telugu	
1993	Thodu Dongalu	Item Number	Telugu	
1993	Assale Pellaina Vaani	Manga	Telugu	
1993	Alibaba Aradajanu Dongalu	SP'S Wife	Telugu	
1993	Minmini Poochigal		Tamil	
1994	Kishkinda Kanda	Heroine	Telugu	
1994	Gharana Alludu	Item Number	Telugu	
1994	Atta Kodallu		Telugu	
1994	Vijaypath	Dancer	Hindi	
1994	Naaraaz		Hindi	
1994	Seeman		Tamil	
1994	Maa Voori Maaraju		Telugu	
1994	Pari Poyina Khaideelu	Female Lead.	Telugu	
1994	Oru Vasantha Geetham		Tamil	
1994	Athiradi Padai		Tamil	
1994	Priyanka	Special Role	Tamil	
1994	Seevalaperi Pandi	Item number	Tamil	
1994	Vaanga Partner Vaanga	Menaka	Tamil	
1994	Palnati Pourusham	Bala	Telugu	
1994	Samaram		Telugu	
1994	Pacha Thoranam	Item Number	Telugu	
1994	Bhale Mavayya	Item Number	Telugu	
1994	Donga Rascal	Item Number	Telugu	
1994	President Gari Alludu	Item Number	Telugu	
1994	Bangaru Mogudu	Item Number	Telugu	
1994	Maro Quit India	Item Number	Telugu	
1994	CID Unnikrishnan B.A., B.Ed.		Malayalam	
1994	Chinna		Kannada	
1994	Makkala Sakshi	Item Number	Kannada	
1994	Lockup Death	Item Number	Kannada	
1994	Gentleman Security	Item Dance	Malayalam	
1994	May Madham	Palakkattu Machanukku song	Tamil	(Guest Appearance)
1994	Hero		Tamil	
1994	Veera Padhakkam		Tamil	
1994	Allarodu	Beauty Queen Sneha	Telugu	
1994	Time Bomb		Kannada	
1994	Palleturi Mogudu	Item Number	Telugu	
1995	Karma	Item Dancer	Malayalam	
1995	Spadikam	Laila	Malayalam	
1995	Lucky Man	Jillu	Tamil	
1995	Vaanga Partner Vaanga		Tamil	
1995	Raja Muthirai		Tamil	
1995	Mazhavil Koodaram	Rathi Teacher	Malayalam	
1995	Hijack	Dalia	Malayalam	
1995	Bhale Bullodu	Item number	Telugu	
1995	Chilakapachcha Kaapuram	Item number	Telugu	
1995	Subhamastu	Item number	Telugu	
1995	Villadhi Villain		Tamil	
1995	Thottil Kuzhandhai		Tamil	
1995	Puthiya Aatchi	Item number	Tamil	
1995	Witness	Special role	Tamil	
1995	Special Squad	Madhumathi	Malayalam	
1995	Highway	Item Dance	Malayalam	
1995	Kaattile Thadi Thevarude Aana		Malayalam	
1995	Thumboli Kadappuram	Clara	Malayalam	
1995	Three Men Army	Item Dancer	Malayalam	
1995	Arabikadaloram	Vaishali	Malayalam	
1995	Ganeshana Galate	Contract Killer	Kannada	
1995	Muddayi Muddugumma	Sheela	Telugu	
1995	Aasthi Mooredu Asha Baaredu	Item number	Telugu	
1995	Kondapalli Rattayya	Item number	Telugu	
1995	Mr. Vasu		Kannada	
1996	Bobbili Bullodu	Item Number	Telugu	
1996	Coimbatore Mappillai	Item Number	Tamil	
1996	Time Bomb		Malayalam, Hindi	
1996	Pallivathukkal Thommichan	Kathreena	Malayalam	
1996	K. L. 7/95 Ernakulam North		Malayalam	
1996	Karnataka Suputhra	Rosie	Kannada	
1996	Sugavaasam		Malayalam	
1996	Sulthan Hyderali	Volga	Malayalam	
1996	Kireedamillatha Rajakkanmar	Rajamma	Malayalam	
1996	Dominic Presentation	Item number	Malayalam	
1996	Hitlist		Malayalam	
1996	Aavathum Pennale Azhivathum Pennale	item Number	Tamil	
1996	Maa Aavida Collector	Bomma	Telugu	
1996	Subash	Item Number	Tamil	
1996	Rajali	Guest Role	Tamil	
1996	Thirumbi Paar	Vasantha	Tamil	
1996	Samayakkondu Sullu	Radha	Kannada	(final film role)
