= Nisa Azeezi =

Indian singer

Background information
- Born: Malappuram, Malappuram, Kerala
- Genre: Qawwali
- Occupations: Composer, singer
- Instrument: Harmonium / violin
- Years active: 1998–present

Nisa Azeezi (നിസ അസീസി) is a Ghazal and Qawwali singer from Kerala, India,

She worked as the Head of the Music Department at MES Muslim Education Society Senior Secondary School, Tirur for 20 years. She also worked as a music teacher at the Mamangam Performing Arts Centre in Qatar from 2018 to 2020. Nisa as a singer explores Qawwali in the great Hindustani Music traditions. She is still practicing under Rafique Khan in Dharwad gharana.

== Education ==
- Ganabhooshanam- The Degree in music conferred by Chembai Memorial Government Music College, Palakkad, Kerala.
- Carnatic music Vocal under Sri. K.G.Marar.
- Hindustani Vocal Diploma from Akhil Bharatiya Gandharva Mahavidyalaya Mandal
- Hindustani Music Vocal training in gurukula tradition under A.E. Vincent Master, Sarat Chandra Maratte, Umer Bhai, Jaipur-Atrauli gharana, Ustad Faiyaz Khan (Karnataka singer), Kirana gharana & Ustad Rafique Khan, Dharwad Gharana.

== Recognition ==
- Received Junior Fellowship constituted by Central Ministry of Culture (India) on the subject of The Ghazal Tradition of Malabar in the year 2000
- Kerala Sangeetha Nataka Akademi Award 2023

== Discography: Ghazals/Qawwalis ==
Year	Album title	Song title	Lyricist	Composer
2010	Ethra Madhuramaay Padunnu nee	Ariyaatha Bhashayil	T.P. Rajeevan	Nisa Azeezi
2010	Ethra Madhuramaay Padunnu nee	Naadha Ninte ee Radha	Kanesh Poonur	Nisa Azeezi
2010	Ethra Madhuramaay Padunnu nee	Oduvilee Athura	N P Koya	Nisa Azeezi
2010	Ethra Madhuramaay Padunnu nee	Neela Nilavinte	Alankode Leelakrishnan	K Baburaj
2010	Ethra Madhuramaay Padunnu nee	Doore Doore	Anitha Thampi	K Baburaj
2010	Ethra Madhuramaay Padunnu nee	Enthinu nirdhayam	Jamal Kochangadi	Muhammed Akbar
2010	Ethra Madhuramaay Padunnu nee	Marmaram kuliraarnnu	Somanath	K Baburaj
2010	Ethra Madhuramaay Padunnu nee	Madhumasa ragangal	Alankode Leelakrishnan	K Baburaj
2010	Ethra Madhuramaay Padunnu nee	Madhurodaram	Kanesh Poonur	Nisa Azeezi
2008	Jazba E Dil	Majnu Ne	Allama Iqbal	Muhammed Akbar
2008	Jazba E Dil	Phirmuje	Mirza Ghalib	Muhammed Akbar
2008	Jazba E Dil	Dhartho	Momin Khan Momin	Muhammed Akbar
2008	Jazba E Dil	Naqshafar	Mirza Ghalib	Muhammed Akbar
2008	Jazba E Dil	Baseecha	Mirza Ghalib	Muhammed Akbar
2008	Jazba E Dil	Jois shor	Mir Taqi Mir	Muhammed Akbar
2008	Jazba E Dil	Paaltha	Allama Iqbal	Muhammed Akbar
2008	Jazba E Dil	Kaleesa	Allama Iqbal	Muhammed Akbar
2012	Ya Moula- The first sufi Rock album in Malayalam	Allahu Allahu	Jamal Kochangadi	Nisa Azeezi
2012	Ya Moula- The first sufi Rock album in Malayalam	Qwaja Nizamudhin	EM Hashim	Nisa Azeezi
2012	Ya Moula- The first sufi Rock album in Malayalam	Dheeraril Dheeran	Rajesh MA	Nisa Azeezi
2012	Ya Moula- The first sufi Rock album in Malayalam	Oru raathri née	Rafeeq Ahmed	Nisa Azeezi
2012	Ya Moula- The first sufi Rock album in Malayalam	Ya Moula	Mustafa Desamangalam	Nisa Azeezi
2011	Sneha Prakasham	Parisudhanayavane	Paulose Kakkasseri	Paulose Kakkasseri
2009	Nanma Nirayum Kalam	Nanma	Anwar Valiyad	Nisa Azeezi
2009	Ini varillenna vishadam	Ini varillenna	P P Ramachandran	Nisa Azeezi
2009	Njangalund Koode	theme song for Malayala Manorama Palliative care	mahesh	Nisa Azeezi
2001	Mazhayente Manassinu Kuliraanu	Mazhayente	OP Suresh	Nisa Azeezi
2013	Pachamanninum Prayuvanund	Pachamanninum	Mallyka Maryam	Nisa Azeezi
2013	Adukkalakkai	Adukkalakkai	Mallyka Maryam	Nisa Azeezi
2008	Viswam Chamacheedum	Viswam	Anil	Nisa Azeezi
2013	Prapancha Naadha	Prapancha	Mustafa Desamangalam	Nisa Azeezi
2018	Aarradi Mannu	Aarradi Mannu	Ashraf Poongode	herlself
2022	Fa ainma thuwallu	Fa ainma thuwallu	Quaran	herlself
2023	Avale Nee kanduvo Kaatte	Avale Nee kanduvo	Anvar Ali	Muhsin Kurikkal
2023	Pranayame	Pranayame	E M Hashim	Mohamed Akbar
2023	Ya Moula Ya	Ya Moula Ya	E M Hashim	Mohamed Akbar
2023	Vinninnapartha	Vinnin	P A Siddique	herlself
