= Chappa =

- Directed by: P. A. Backer
- Written by: Jamal Kochangadi (story); P. A. Backer (screenplay); Dr Pavithran (dialogues)
- Produced by: P.K Abdul Lathif
- Starring: Hari; Kunjandi; Beena
- Cinematography: Vipindas
- Edited by: Ayyappan
- Music by: Devarajan
- Release date: 1982
- Country: India
- Language: Malayalam

Chappa (English: Token) is a 1982 Malayalam film directed by P. A. Backer and starring Hari, Kunjandi and Beena. The film is about a lone individual's determined fight against tyranny. It won the National Film Award for Best Feature Film in Malayalam. This was the debut movie of actor Zainuddin. He played a character named Vasu in this movie.

== Cast ==
- Hari as Azeez
- Kunjandi
- Beena
- Zainuddin as Vasu
