= T. Abdul Rahman =

Indian footballer (1934–2002)

- Born: T. Abdul Rahman; 20 January 1934; Kozhikode
- Died: 15 December 2002 (aged 68) kozhikode
- Occupation: Footballer

T. Abdul Rahman (1934 – 15 December 2002), also known as Olympian Rahman, was an Indian football defender from Kozhikode, Kerala, who represented the country at the Summer Olympics. He played as a defender. Abdul Rahman was a member of the Indian football team that reached the semi-final in the 1956 Melbourne Olympics.

== Early life ==
Abdul Rahman was born in Kozhikode. As a child, Abdul Rahman was always fascinated with football and stopped his studies as early as the 4th grade to fulfill his dreams of becoming a footballer.

== Career ==
He began his club career in the early 1950s with local clubs in Calicut. He was selected in the team of Independence Sports club, Kozhikode and later joined the Universal Club. He became the star of Malabar football during that period.

In 1954, he represented the Malabar team which reached the semi-finals of the Rovers Cup in 1954.

19-year-old Abdul Rahman marked his debut for the country against Russia in 1955 at Thiruvananthapuram. The call up to Team India was yet again rewarded with a transfer to the erstwhile Rajasthan Club and he also went on to play for Mohun Bagan in 1959. Abdul Rahman spearheaded the Bagan defence during the early 1960s and also captained the Kolkata giants.

He went on to play for many leading football clubs in India including Rajasthan Club and Mohun Bagan Club of Kolkata. He spearheaded the Mohun Bagan defense during the 1950s and the 1960s and was the captain of the Kolkata club.

Abdul Rahman represented Bengal in the Santosh Trophy National Football Championship 9 times between 1955 and 1966. He helped the team win 4 titles during this span. He also captained Bangalore to win Santosh Trophy in 1962.

The Indian football team which represented the country in the 1956 Melbourne Olympics also featured Abdul Rahman. The team reached the semi-finals and even beat the hosts 4-2 en route to the semi-finals. Abdul Rahman was forced to miss the next Olympics at Rome in 1960 due to an injury.

Abdul Rahman retired from the game on 10 November 1967. In the later stages of his life, he coached the giants of football like Mohammedan Sporting, Premier Tyres and Travancore Titanium. He died on 15 December 2002 at the age of 69.

== Olympian Rahman Memorial Academy of Football ==
Abdul Rahman died on 15 December 2002 in Calicut at the age of 68. After his death the football lovers of Kozhikode asked for the establishment of a sports academy in his honour. In 2005 the Kozhikode District Football Association (KDFA) duly created the academy. The aim of the Olympian Rehman Memorial Academy of Football is to promote young talent in Kerala especially in the Malabar region. Mathrubhumi news daily published his playing memories in their Sunday supplement namely "Memories in playgrounds" i.e.കളിക്കളത്തിലെ ഓർമ്മകൾ".

== Honours ==
=== India ===
- Merdeka Tournament runner-up: 1959

=== Bengal ===
- Santosh Trophy: 1955–56, 1958-59, 1959–60

== In popular culture ==
Abdul Rahman had a role in the movie Chuvanna Vithukal (1978) directed by P.A. Backer.
