= Sarah Thomas (writer) =

Indian writer (1934–2023)

- Born: 14 September 1934; Trivandrum, Travancore. British Raj
- Died: 31 March 2023 (aged 88); Trivandrum, Kerala, India
- Occupation: Novelist
- Spouse: Dr. Thomas Zachariah
- Children: Shobha George and Deepa Thomas
- Writing career
- Language: Malayalam, English, Hindi
- Genre: Fiction
- Notable works: Narmadi Pudava, Daivamakkal
- Notable awards: Kerala Sahitya Akademi Award (1979, 2010)

Sarah Thomas (15 September 1934 – 31 March 2023) was an Indian Malayalam language writer from Kerala. Her novel Narmadi Pudava won the Kerala Sahitya Akademi Award in the year 1979. Thomas was also a recipient of Kerala Sahitya Akademi Award for Overall Contribution to Malayalam Literature.

== Life and career ==
Thomas had started writing long before the concept of feminine literature evolved in Malayalam. She published her first novel Jivitamenna Nadi at the age of 34. She became noted in the literary field after the publication of the novel Murippadukal in 1971. The novel narrated the life of a young man brought up in a Roman Catholic orphanage and later transferred to his Hindu ancestral home, where he is subtly persuaded to conform to Hindu religious beliefs. His attempts to establish an identity for himself in a situation full of conflicts were dealt with in the novel. It was later filmed as Manimuzhakkam by P. A. Backer, that won several awards, including the National Film Award for Best Feature Film in Malayalam and the Kerala State Film Award for Best Film.

There are three other novels of hers, Asthamayam, Pavizhamuthu and Archana, which too have been filmed. Her best known work is Narmani Putava which won the Kerala Sahitya Akademi Award in 1979. The novel portrayed a Brahmin girl whose fate it was to agree to marry the man of her father's choice so that he would have a peaceful end. Two books the author rated as her favourites are Daivamakkal and Grahanam. A milestone in Kerala's Dalit literature, Daivamakkal (Children of God) tells the tale of a Dalit boy, his trials and tribulations as a medical student as well as in later life. Kunjikannan, the protagonist of the novel, is a symbol of an individual trying to break from the often sub-human status that was his lot as a Dalit. The novel was translated into English by Sosanna Kuruvilla. Grahanam (Eclipse) narrates the harrowing experiences that a Keralite boy and his lady love, a German, had to undergo in Lebanon.

Sarah Thomas died at her daughter's residence in Trivandrum on 31 March 2023, at the age of 88.

== Works ==
- Jivitamenna Nadi (1968)
- Murippadukal (1971)
- Pavizha Muthu (1972)
- Archana (1977)
- Narmadi Pudava (1978)
- Daivamakkal (1982)
- Agni Suddhi (1988)
- Chinnammu (1988)
- Valakkar (1994)
- Neelakkurinjikal Chuvakkum Neram (1995)
- Asthamayam
- Gunitham Thettiya Kanakku
- Grahanam
- Thanneer Panthal
- Yathra
- Kaveri
