= K. P. A. C. Beatrice =

Indian theatre actress

- Born: 1937 (age 88–89); Fort Kochi, Kerala, India
- Occupation: theatre actress
- Spouse: Joseph
- Children: 2
- Parents: Vakko (father); Mariam (mother)
- Awards: Kerala Sangeetha Nataka Akademi Award (1988); Kerala State Award for drama acting (1998); Kerala Sangeetha Nataka Akademi Fellowship (2019)

K. P. A. C. Beatrice is an Indian theatre actress from Kerala. She received many awards including the Kerala Sangeetha Nataka Akademi Award in 1988 and the Kerala State Award for drama acting in 1998 and the Kerala Sangeetha Nataka Akademi Fellowship for the year 2019.

== Biography ==
Beatrice was born to Vakko and Mariam of the Ilanjikkal family in Fort Kochi. While Beatrice working as a heroine in K. P. A. C. plays, her marriage with Joseph, a native of Pathanamthitta was fixed. But due to her affliations with the Communist Party of India, there were disgareements within the church about conducting the marriage. Finally, it was decided that if Beatrice agreed to hold a wooden cross and attend the masses (Qurbana), the marriage can be conducted. Beatrice gave her consent and she married Joseph in 1962, following which she took a break from acting for about six years.

Beatrice, lives with her eldest daughter Asha and her family in Koovappadam, Thoppumpady in Ernakulam district. Bindu is her youngest daughter.

== Theatre career ==
Beatrice first acted in Pala Narayanan Nair's play 'Kaviyude Makal', while she was only eight years old. Then, at the age of thirteen, she joined P. J. Antony's troupe. She became famous with the play 'Charitharthyam' of Antony. She gained more attention in 1954 for her role as the heroine Janu in Erur Vasudev's 'Jeevitham Avasanikkunnilla', which was presented by Kerala Progressive Theatrical Arts. That play was performed in about a hundred stages.

While studying dance at Kerala Kalamandalam, she often went with the dance team of Gangadharan Master at Kalamandalam. Their dance performance would have preceded KPAC's play, and through that trips she got acquainted with the Kerala People's Arts Club (KPAC). It was in 1957, people including Thoppil Bhasi invited her to KPAC. The first play she acted in KPAC was 'Survekkallu'. Later, she acted in plays like 'Mudiyanaya Putran', and 'Enik maranamilla', and travelled all over Kerala with the KPAC troupe.

Since she was mainly a dancer, the influence of dance even on her movements became a problem in the stage acting. It was Thoppil Bhasi who changed that and turned her into a theatre actress,' says Beatrice.

After joining the KPAC, she later became close to the Communist Party of India. Although her family members were communist sympathizers, she left the KPAC and joined other troops due to opposition from the other family members and locals, even during her marriage.

Later, she went abroad with her husband for two years. During that time, her husband suffered a stroke. While she was suffering her life with her two children and her husband who was bedridden for six years, she was invited to rejoin the KPAC, and she accepted the invitation and rejoined.

During her second foray into theatre acting with KPAC, she toured all over India with noted plays like 'Innale, Innu, Nale', and 'Ningalenne Communist Akki'. Beatrice, who was with KPAC for 22 of her 60-year theatrical career.

After leaving KPAC, she worked in Cochin Sangamithra for eight years and later in other troupes in Kerala like Suryasoma, Angamaly Pooja, Thiruvananthapuram Aradhana, Kundamkulam Geethanjali, Poonjar Navadhara, and Vaikom Malavika. She last acted in John Fernandes' play 'Kolakolli'.

== Film career ==
Beatrice has acted in Malayalam films like, Oru Sundariyude Katha (1972) and Enippadikal (1973) directed by Thoppil Bhasi, Hridayam Oru Kshethram (1976) directed by P. Subramaniam, Manimuzhakkam (1978) directed by P. A. Backer, Ahalya (1978) directed by Babu Nanthankode, Madaalasa (1978) directed by J. Williams, Lillipookkal (1979) directed by T. S. Mohan, Randu Mukhangal (1981) directed by P. G. Vasudevan, Kaalam (1982) directed by Hemachandran, Kanakachilanga Kilungi Kilungi (1982) directed by Vijayaraghavan, Calender (2009) directed by Mahesh Padmanabhan, Vadhyar (2012) directed by Nidheesh Shakti, Amen (2013) directed by Lijo Jose Pellissery and Annayum Rasoolum (2013) directed by Rajeev Ravi.

== Awards and honors ==
Beatrice received the Kerala Sangeetha Nataka Akademi Award in 1988 and the State Award for drama acting in 1998 for her performance in Angamaly Pooja's 'Deshavilakku'. She also won the POC Award for Poonjar Navadhara's 'Akshayamanasam'. In 2020, Beatrice received the Kerala Sangeetha Nataka Akademi Fellowship for the year 2019. In 2025, she received the Indian People's Theatre Association (IPTA) V. T. Bhattathiripad Memorial State Drama Award.
