= Charam =

- Directed by: P. A. Backer
- Written by: Raghunath Paleri; Jayan (dialogues)
- Screenplay by: P. A. Backer Associate Director= Adam Ayub
- Produced by: C. H. Khalid
- Starring: Prem Nazir; Meena Menon; Urmila
- Cinematography: Hemachandran
- Edited by: Ravi
- Music by: G. Devarajan
- Production company: Chitramandir
- Distributed by: Kings Creation
- Release date: 11 February 1983
- Country: India
- Language: Malayalam

Charam is a 1983 Indian Malayalam film, directed by P. A. Backer and produced by C. H. Khalid. The film stars Prem Nazir and Meena Menon in the lead roles. The film follows the search by a lawyer for his missing daughter in Bombay's red-light district. The film is considered a breakthrough in independent Malayalam cinema and features a musical . It has a musical score by G. Devarajan.

== Plot ==
Barrister James lives with his daughter Preethi following the death of his wife. Preethi feels incredibly lonely and isolated at home since James is very busy with his work. Preethi's only friend is Lily, whom she meets at college.

One day, Preethi goes missing. James soon realizes that she has not attended college for several days. He starts a frantic search for his daughter, but his efforts are in vain until he listens to an audio recording made by her, which inadvertently reveals her relationship with a man named Charlie. James inquires about Charlie but gets no information. Later, Lily gives James details about Charlie and a photo of him.

After a few days, Lily receives a letter that says Preethi is in Bombay. James travels to Bombay to search for his daughter. He happens to see a nude picture of Preethi on the cover of a fashion magazine. In disguise as a magazine owner in Kerala, James befriends a nude photographer named Desai to know more about Preethi's whereabouts, but he does not get much information. However, he discovers that Charlie was friends with a photographer named Gopan and tracks him down. Gopan denies having taken Preethi's nude cover photo, but he does reveal where Charlie lives. James confronts Charlie, who tells him that Preethi is no longer with him and has become a sex worker in the city's red-light district.

James goes to the city's red-light district in search of his daughter, but it takes several attempts before he is able to find her. With the help of a Malayali man, James rescues Preethi by paying off the brothel owner. The last shot of the film shows Preethi and James in the backseat of the car, surrounded by several sex workers laughing at them.

== Cast ==
- Prem Nazir as Barrister James
- Meena Menon as Preethi
- Urmila as Lily
- Hari
- Cochin Haneefa
- Manju George
- Bindulekha
- Chandraji
- Chaplin
- Jagannatha Varma as S. P. Sahadevan
- Kalyanikkutty Amma
- Sadhana
- Valsala
- Mookambika B. Nair
- Siddiq as Charlie
- G A Jose
- Sukumaran

== Soundtrack ==
The film's music was composed by G. Devarajan. A version of the song "Man Mohanaa Bade Jhoote" from the Hindi film Seema is used in the film.

| No. | Song | Singers | Lyrics | Music |
|---|---|---|---|---|
| 1 | "Man Mohanaa Bade Jhoote" (Resung from Hindi film Seema) | P. Madhuri | Shailendra | Shankar Jaikishan |

== Reception ==
The film attained critical appreciation but was not a commercial success. Nevertheless, the film is considered a breakthrough in independent cinema in Malayalam. Most of Backer's films won big at Kerala State Film Awards and National Film Awards. However, Backer refused to send Charam to be considered for any award because he objected to the addition of some sex sequences and unwanted scenes in the film eying commercial benefit.

== Additional information ==
Mammooty, then an aspiring actor, was interested in the role of Charlie in the movie. Director Backer thought someone with a rugged look would be better suited for the role. Eventually, the role went to Siddiq, a Kozhikode-based actor. For this movie, actor Prem Nazir reportedly chose to work for nearly half his regular remuneration.
