= M. Sukumaran =

Malayalam writer

- Born: 1943; Chittoor, Palakkad, Kerala, India
- Died: 16 March 2018 (aged 75); Thiruvananthapuram, Kerala, India
- Occupation: Writer
- Spouse: Meenakshi
- Children: Rajni Mannadiar
- Relatives: Narayana Mannadiar (father); Meenakshi Amma (mother)
- Writing career
- Genres: Short story, novel
- Notable works: Marichittillathavarude Smarakangal; Seshakriya; Chuvanna Chihnangal; Janithakam; Para; Azhimukham
- Notable awards: 1976 Kerala Sahitya Akademi Award for Story; 1981 Kerala State Film Award for Best Story; 1992 Padmarajan Award; 1995 Kerala State Film Award for Best Story; 2003 Kerala Sahitya Akademi Award for Overall Contributions; 2006 Sahitya Akademi Award

M. Sukumaran (1943 – 16 March 2018) was an Indian writer of Malayalam literature, best known for his novels and short stories with political undertones. Marichittillathavarude Smarakangal, Seshakriya, Chuvanna Chihnangal and Janithakam feature among his works and five of his stories have been adapted into films. A two time recipient of the Kerala State Film Award for Best Story, Sukumaran received the Kerala Sahitya Akademi Award for Story in 1976 and the Sahitya Akademi Award in 2006.

== Biography ==
M. Sukumaran was born in 1943 at Chittur in Palakkad District of the south Indian state of Kerala to Narayana Mannadiar and Meenakshi Amma. After completing his school education, he started his career at a sugar factory. Moving to Thiruvananthapuram in 1963, he joined the Accountant General's office as a clerk, after which he was also active in trade union activities as a member of the Communist Party of India (Marxist). His political activities led to his termination i 1974, reported to be the first time a central government employee was terminated by a Presidential order. Later, he was known to have been disappointed with the left-wing politics and his portrayal of a disillusioned politician in his novel, Seshakriya, resulted in his expulsion from the party in 1982.

Sukumaran was married to Meenakshi and the couple had a daughter, Rajani. He died on March 16, 2018, aged 75, at Sree Chitra Tirunal Institute for Medical Sciences and Technology, Thiruvananthapuram where he was undergoing treatment for heart-related illnesses. Rajani, is also a writer, writing under the name, Rajni Mannadiar.

== Legacy ==
Have I slipped into sleep even before the story has ended? The crows have started cawing. The roosters are also crowing. The night of the one in custody is ending. The night of the one to be caught is beginning. One is interested to know. How long for the sun to rise? Excerpts from a Sukumaran story.

I can hear around me the question as to why I stopped writing. I had to end my career because of a strong and ceaseless inner voice telling me that I have written whatever I had to write in this life and if I write again I will just be repeating what I have already written. An artist should never accept the fate of a bullock going round and round an oil-press. And no one else can share or resolve the dilemmas in a writer's creative life. Sukumaran wrote when he decided to quit writing in 1982.

Sukumaran, who was known to have started writing from the age of 16, published his first story, Mazhathullikal, in Malayala Manorama, in 1963, when he was 20 years. He continued writing until his death, occasionally taking long breaks in between, to publish three novels and over 50 short stories which include Sheshakriya, Chuvanna Chihnangal, Janithakam, Thookkumarangal Njangalkku, Marichittillaathavarude Smaarakangal, Para, Azhimukham and Vanchikkunnampathi. Five of his stories have been adapted into films, viz. Sanghaganam, Sheshakriya, Kazhakam, Margam and Unarthupattu of which he wrote the screenplay for Sheshakriya. He also wrote a biographical book, Swadeshabhimani, Kelappan, Abdur Rahiman, which featured the biographies of Swadeshabhimani Ramakrishna Pillai, K. Kelappan and Mohammed Abdur Rahiman, as a part of a biographical series, Mahacharithangaliloode.

== Awards and honours ==
Sukumaran received the Kerala Sahitya Akademi Award for Story in 1976 for his short story anthology, Marichittillathavarude Smarakam. The film, Sheshakriya fetched him his first Kerala State Film Award for Best Story in 1981; he would receive the award again in 1995 for the film, Kazhakam. In between, he received the inaugural Padmarajan Award for his book, Pithru Tharpanam. Kerala Sahitya Akademi honoured him again in 2003 with the award for overall contributions in 2003 and Sahitya Akademi selected his short story anthology, Chuvanna Chinnangal, for their annual award in 2006.

== Bibliography ==
=== Novels ===
- Sukumaran. M (1994). Janithakam. Current Books, Kottayam: Current Books, Kottayam.
- Sukumaran, M. (2010). Seshakriya. Kottayam: DC Books. ISBN 9788171300075.
- Sukumaran, M. (2011). Chuvanna chihnangal. Kottayam: D C Books. ISBN 9788126414574.

=== Short story anthologies ===
- Sukumaran M (1973). Thookkumarangal Njangalkku. Author.
- Sukumaran M (1976). Charithra ghadha. Shakti Publishers.
- Sukumaran. M (1979). Marichittillathavarude Smarakangal. Kottayam Sahitya pravartaka saha: sangam: Kottayam Sahitya pravartaka saha: sangam.
- Sukumaran, M. (1981). Asura sankeerthanam. Kottayam: D.C. Books.
- Sukumaran, M. (1992). M. Sukumarante kathakal. Kottayam: Current Books.
- Sukumaran, M. (1994). Pithrutharpanam. Kollam: Imprint Books.
- Sukumaran. M (1996). Kunjappuvinte dhuswapnangal. Thiruvananthapuram: Korus Books.
- Sukumaran, M. (2006). Ente priyapetta kathakal. Thrissur: H&C.

=== Non fiction ===
- M. Sukumaran (2008). Swadeshabhimani, Kelappan, Abdurahman. Kairali Publications. ISBN 978-81-7152-089-3. Archived from the original on 28 March 2019.

== Filmography ==
Year	Film	Contribution	Director
1979	Sanghaganam	story	P. A. Backer
1980	Unarthupattu	story	P. A. Backer
1982	Sheshakriya	story, screenplay	Ravi Alummoodu
1996	Kazhakam	story	M. P. Sukumaran Nair
2003	Margam	story	Rajiv Vijay Raghavan

== See also ==
- List of Malayalam-language authors by category
- List of Malayalam-language authors
