= S. P. Bhayankar =

- Theatrical release poster
- Directed by: V. B. Rajendra Prasad
- Written by: Acharya Aatreya (dialogues)
- Screenplay by: Pushparajan
- Story by: Pushparajan
- Based on: Post Mortem (1982)
- Produced by: V. B. Rajendra Prasad
- Starring: Akkineni Nageswara Rao; Krishnam Raju; Sridevi; Vijayashanti
- Cinematography: S. Navakanth
- Edited by: A. Sanjeevi
- Music by: K. V. Mahadevan
- Production company: Jagapathi Art Pictures
- Release date: 1 May 1984
- Running time: 145 mins
- Country: India
- Language: Telugu

S.P. Bhayankar is a 1984 Telugu-language thriller film, produced and directed by V. B. Rajendra Prasad under his Jagapathi Art Pictures banner. It stars Akkineni Nageswara Rao, Krishnam Raju, Sridevi and Vijayashanti, with music composed by K. V. Mahadevan. The film is a remake of the Malayalam film Post Mortem (1982).

== Cast ==
- Akkineni Nageswara Rao as Father James & S.P. John Yugandhar (dual role)
- Krishnam Raju as George Bhayankar
- Sridevi as Devi
- Vijayashanti as Lakshmi
- Suresh as Johnny
- Gollapudi Maruti Rao
- Rallapalli as Mohammad
- P. L. Narayana
- Hema Sundar as Parishudam
- Jeeva as Chinna
- Geetha as Mary
- Rama Prabha as Ankhamma
- Samyuktha as Mumtaz
- Silk Smitha as item number
- Dubbing Janaki

== Crew ==
- Art: S. Krishna Rao
- Choreography: Prakash
- Fights: Madhavan
- Dialogues - Lyrics: Acharya Aatreya
- Playback: S. P. Balasubrahmanyam, P. Susheela
- Music: K. V. Mahadevan
- Story- Screenplay: Pushparajan
- Editing: A. Sanjeevi
- Cinematography: S. Navanth
- Producer - Director: V. B. Rajendra Prasad
- Banner: Jagapathi Art Pictures
- Release Date: 1 May 1985

== Soundtrack ==
S. P. Bhayankar

Film score by K. V. Mahadevan
- Released: 1984
- Genre: Soundtrack
- Length: 21:14
- Producer: K. V. Mahadevan

K. V. Mahadevan chronology
Janani Janmabhoomi (1984)	S. P. Bhayankar (1984)	Abhimanyudu (1984)

Music composed by K. V. Mahadevan. Lyrics were written by Acharya Aatreya.

S. No.	Song title	Singers	length
1	"Nenu Okasari"	S. P. Balasubrahmanyam, P. Susheela	4:26
2	"Vastu Vastu"	S. P. Balasubrahmanyam, P. Susheela	3:45
3	"Kassu Bussu"	P. Susheela	4:17
4	"Um Kani Kani"	S. P. Balasubrahmanyam, P. Susheela	4:24
5	"Aaja Dekho Maja"	S. P. Balasubrahmanyam, P. Susheela	4:22
