= Manimuzhakkam =

- Directed by: P. A. Backer
- Written by: P. A. Backer (screenplay); Sarah Thomas (story & dialogues)
- Produced by: Cartoonist Thomas
- Starring: Harikeshan Thampi; Sreenivasan; Cyril P Jacob
- Cinematography: Vipindas
- Edited by: Ravi Kiran
- Music by: Devarajan
- Release date: 30 April 1976
- Country: India
- Language: Malayalam

Manimuzhakkam (lit. 'The Tolling of Bells') is a 1976 Malayalam-language film directed by P. A. Backer and starring Harikeshan Thampi, Veeran, Johnson, Sankaradi, Saritha, Urmila, Vani, Cyril P. Jacob, Charulatha, Santhakumari, Sreenivasan and Meena Ganesh. Sreenivasan made his acting debut with this film. The film was scripted by Backer based on the novel Murippaadukal by Sarah Thomas. It won the National Film Award for Best Feature Film in Malayalam. The film also won the Kerala state awards for best film, best screenplay ( Backer), and best black & white cinematography (Vipin Das).

The film was shot in black-and-white even though colour films were common during those times (colour films became popular in Malayalam cinema only from 1978 to 1980 and good-quality colour films started being shot frequently only from 1983 onwards).

== Cast ==
- Harikeshan Thampi as Jose Paul
- Veeran
- Cyril P Jacob
- Johnson
- Sankaradi
- Saritha
- Urmila
- Vani
- Charulatha
- Sreenivasan as vayaran Michael
- Santhakumari
- Meena Ganesh
- Immatty
- KPAC Beatrice
- Ponjikkara Kalyani Amma

== Trivia ==
Initially, director Backer had Mammootty in mind for the role of Michael, but it eventually went to Sreenivasan.
