= Antony Eastman =

Indian film director (1946–2021)

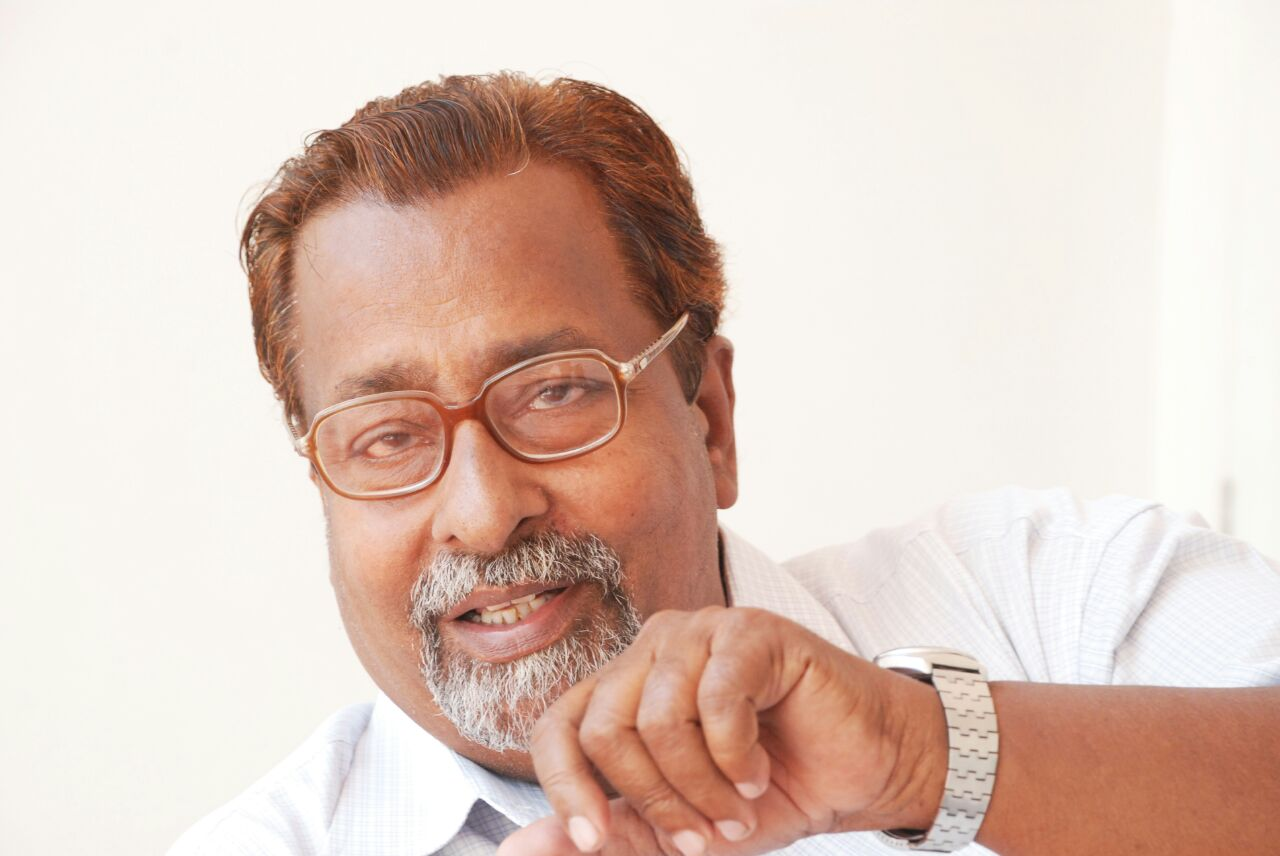
- Eastman
- Born: 26 August 1946; Chowannur, Kingdom of Cochin, British India
- Died: 3 July 2021 (aged 74); Thumboor, Irinjalakuda, Thrissur, India
- Occupation: Indian film Director
- Children: Ganji, Mini

Antony Eastman (26 August 1946 – 3 July 2021) was an Indian film director. He directed six films, Ambada Njaane! being his most noteworthy film. He was also credited with bringing Silk Smitha to the Malayalam film industry.

== Early life ==
Antony was born as the son of Muringatheri Kuriakose and Martha on 26 August 1946 in Chowannur, Kingdom of Cochin, British India. He completed his school education from Chowannur St Thomas School and Kunnamkulam Government High School. He started his career as a photographer in the mid - 1960s. He started a studio, Eastman, in Ernakulam and soon came to be known as Antony Eastman.

== Personal life ==
He was married to Mary, with whom he had a son and a daughter Ganji and Mini.

== Career ==
His directorial debut film was Inaye Thedi (1979), which was also the debut for Silk Smitha, Johnson Master, Kaloor Dennis and John Paul. He went on to direct another five films: Mridula, Ice Cream, Vayal, Varnatheru and Ambada Njaane. He had worked as a stills photographer for 13 films, as production executive in one film, wrote stories for nine films, wrote the script for one film, produced a film, and acted in a film.

== Filmography ==
=== Director ===
- Inaye Thedi (1981) (directorial debut)
- Vayal (1981)
- Ambada Njaane! (1985)
- Ice Cream (1986)
- Mridula (1990)
- Varnatheru (1999)

== Death ==
Antony died at the age of 74 on 3 July 2021 following a cardiac arrest.
