= Sanghaganam =

- Poster
- Directed by: P. A. Backer
- Written by: M. Sukumaran
- Produced by: Salam Karassery
- Starring: Sreenivasan; Ramu Karyat; P. R. Nambyar; Madhu Master
- Cinematography: Vipindas
- Edited by: Ravi
- Music by: Devarajan
- Production company: Navadhara Movie Makers
- Distributed by: Kairali Films Release
- Release date: 6 April 1979
- Running time: 83 minutes
- Country: India
- Language: Malayalam

Sanghaganam (transl. Chorus) is a 1979 Indian Malayalam-language political drama film directed by P. A. Backer based on a story by M. Sukumaran and starring Sreenivasan, Ramu Karyat, P. R. Nambyar and Madhu Master.

== Plot ==
An unemployed youth decides to protest against the cruel world.

== Cast ==
- Sreenivasan
- Ramu Kariyat
- Madhu Master
- PR Nambiar
- Santhakumari

== Additional information ==
Ramu Karyat, who had a significant role in Sanghaganam, passed away the same year the movie was released.
