= Innaleyude Baakki =

- Directed by: P. A. Backer
- Written by: K. L. Mohana Varma
- Starring: Geetha; Devan; Mini Arun; Sreenath
- Cinematography: Hemachandran
- Edited by: Ravi
- Music by: G. Devarajan
- Production company: Samskara Films
- Distributed by: Samskara Films
- Release date: 13 May 1988
- Country: India
- Language: Malayalam

Innaleyude Baakki is a 1988 Indian Malayalam film directed by P. A. Backer. The film stars Geetha, Devan, Mini Arun and Sreenath in the lead roles. Kadammanitta Ramakrishnan makes a special appearance. The film has musical score by G. Devarajan.

== Plot ==
Advocate Rajasekharan and his wife Sumathy have remained separate for unknown reasons. Their daughter Vandana has been staying with Sumathi and she has never seen her father as her mother Sumathy has never revealed details of her father except that his name is Rajasekharan. Vandana has an affair with her trainer Balu.

== Cast ==
- Geetha as Sumathy
- Devan as Advocate Rajasekharan
- Mini Arun as Vandana
- Sreenath as Balu
- Captain Raju as Doctor
- Sukumari as Rajasekharan's mother
- Mala Aravindan as Sankunni
- Prathapachandran as Balu's father
- T. P. Radhamani as Doctor's wife
- Chithrabhanu K. as Balu's friend
- Kadammanitta Ramakrishnan (special appearance)

== Soundtrack ==
The music was composed by G. Devarajan and the lyrics were written by Yusufali Kechery.

No.	Song	Singers	Lyrics	Length (m:ss)
1	"Neelambari"	P. Madhuri	Yusufali Kechery	
