= Sree Narayana Guru (film) =

- Directed by: P. A. Backer
- Written by: Dr. Pavithran; Vaikkom Chandrasekharan Nair (dialogues)
- Screenplay by: Dr. Pavithran
- Produced by: Kollam Jaffer
- Starring: Kanakalatha; Master Vaisakh; Sree Kumar
- Cinematography: Hemachandran
- Edited by: Ravi
- Music by: G. Devarajan
- Production company: Navabharath Chithralaya
- Distributed by: Navabharath Chithralaya
- Release date: 16 October 1986
- Running time: 96 minutes
- Country: India
- Language: Malayalam

Sree Narayana Guru is a 1986 Indian Malayalam film, directed by P. A. Backer and produced by Kollam Jaffer. The film stars Kanakalatha, Master Vaisakh and Sree Kumar in the lead roles. The film has musical score by G. Devarajan. It won the Nargis Dutt Award for Best Feature Film on National Integration.

== Cast ==
- Kanakalatha as Narayanan's mother
- Master Vaisakh
- Sree Kumar
- Vijayakumari as Narayanan's sister
- Karakulam Chandran as Narayanan's father

== Soundtrack ==
The music was composed by G. Devarajan and the lyrics were written by Kumaranasan, Sreenarayana Guru, Kollam Jaffer and S. Ramesan Nair.

| No. | Song | Singers | Lyrics | Length (m:ss) |
|---|---|---|---|---|
| 1 | "Aaraayukil" | P. Madhuri | Kumaranasan | |
| 2 | "Aazhiyum Thirayum" | P. Jayachandran, Chorus | Sreenarayana Guru | |
| 3 | "Chenthaar Mangum Mukham" | G. Devarajan | Kumaranasan | |
| 4 | "Daivame" | P. Madhuri | Sreenarayana Guru | |
| 5 | "Jaya Naarayanagurupriye" | G. Devarajan | Kumaranasan | |
| 6 | "Maathaave Pol" | G. Devarajan | Kumaranasan | |
| 7 | "Mangalame" (Bit) | | Kollam Jaffer | |
| 8 | "Mizhimunakondu" | M. Balamuralikrishna | Sreenarayana Guru | |
| 9 | "Shivasankara" | P. Jayachandran, Chorus | Sreenarayana Guru | |
| 10 | "Sree Nammalkkanisam" | G. Devarajan | Kumaranasan | |
| 11 | "Udayakunkumam" | M. Balamuralikrishna | S. Ramesan Nair | |
| 12 | "Unnipirannu" | P. Jayachandran, P. Madhuri | Kollam Jaffer | |
| 13 | "Vaazhka Vaazhka" | Chorus, Dr. Dilip | S. Ramesan Nair | |
