= Kokkarakko =

- Title card
- Directed by: Gangai Amaran
- Written by: Gangai Amaran; S. N. Ravi (dialogues)
- Produced by: R. D. Bhaskar
- Starring: Mahesh; Ilavarasi
- Cinematography: Nivas
- Edited by: B. Lenin; V. T. Vijayan
- Music by: Ilaiyaraaja
- Production company: Pavalar Creations
- Release date: 16 September 1983
- Country: India
- Language: Tamil

Kokkarakko is a 1983 Indian Tamil-language film directed and co-written by Gangai Amaran. The film stars Mahesh and Ilavarasi. It was released on 16 September 1983, and did not perform well at the box office.

== Cast ==
- Mahesh
- Ilavarasi
- Smitha
- Shanmugasundaram
- Sasivardhan
- Karikol Raju
- Senji Krishnan
- Kumarimuthu
- Vellai Subbaiah
- Usilai Mani
- Varalakshmi
- Gemini Rajeswari

== Production ==
Kokkarakko is Gangai Amaran's sophomore directorial venture after Kozhi Koovuthu (1982). It is the debut for Ilavarasi, a former child actress, in a leading role, and the third production of Pavalar Creations.

== Soundtrack ==
The music was composed by Ilaiyaraaja. The song "Geetham Sangeetham" is set to the raga Mohanam, and "Kanpuram Devi" is set to Mayamalavagowla.

Track listing
No.	Title	Lyrics	Singer(s)	Length
1.	"Geetham Sangeetham"	Vairamuthu	S. P. Balasubrahmanyam, S. P. Sailaja
2.	"Ketti Melam"	Vaali	S. Janaki
3.	"Geetham Sangeetham" (solo)	Vairamuthu	S. P. Balasubrahmanyam
4.	"Geetham Sangeetham" (pathos)	Vairamuthu	S. P. Balasubrahmanyam
5.	"Geetham"	Vairamuthu	S. P. Sailaja
6.	"Mylapore Pakkam"	Vairamuthu	Malaysia Vasudevan
7.	"Kanpuram Devi"	Siva Gama Sundari	Ilaiyaraaja
8.	"Inthapulla"	Gangai Amaran	B. S. Sasirekha, Saibaba, Sundarrajan, Deepan Chakravarthy, Sudhakar
9.	"Geetham"	Vairamuthu	S. P. Balasubrahmanyam

== Critical reception ==
Jayamanmadhan of Kalki praised the acting of Smitha, Ilaiyaraaja's music and song picturisations but felt Amaran seemed to have not cared about the plot and just went with the flow. Balumani of Anna praised the acting, Ilaiyaraaja's music, Nivas's cinematography and praised Amaran for extracting good work from all actors and technicians.

== Bibliography ==
- Sundararaman (2007) [2005]. Raga Chintamani: A Guide to Carnatic Ragas Through Tamil Film Music (2nd ed.). Pichhamal Chintamani. OCLC 295034757.
