= Chhote Rahimat Khan =

Indian Hindustani classical sitarist (born 1959)

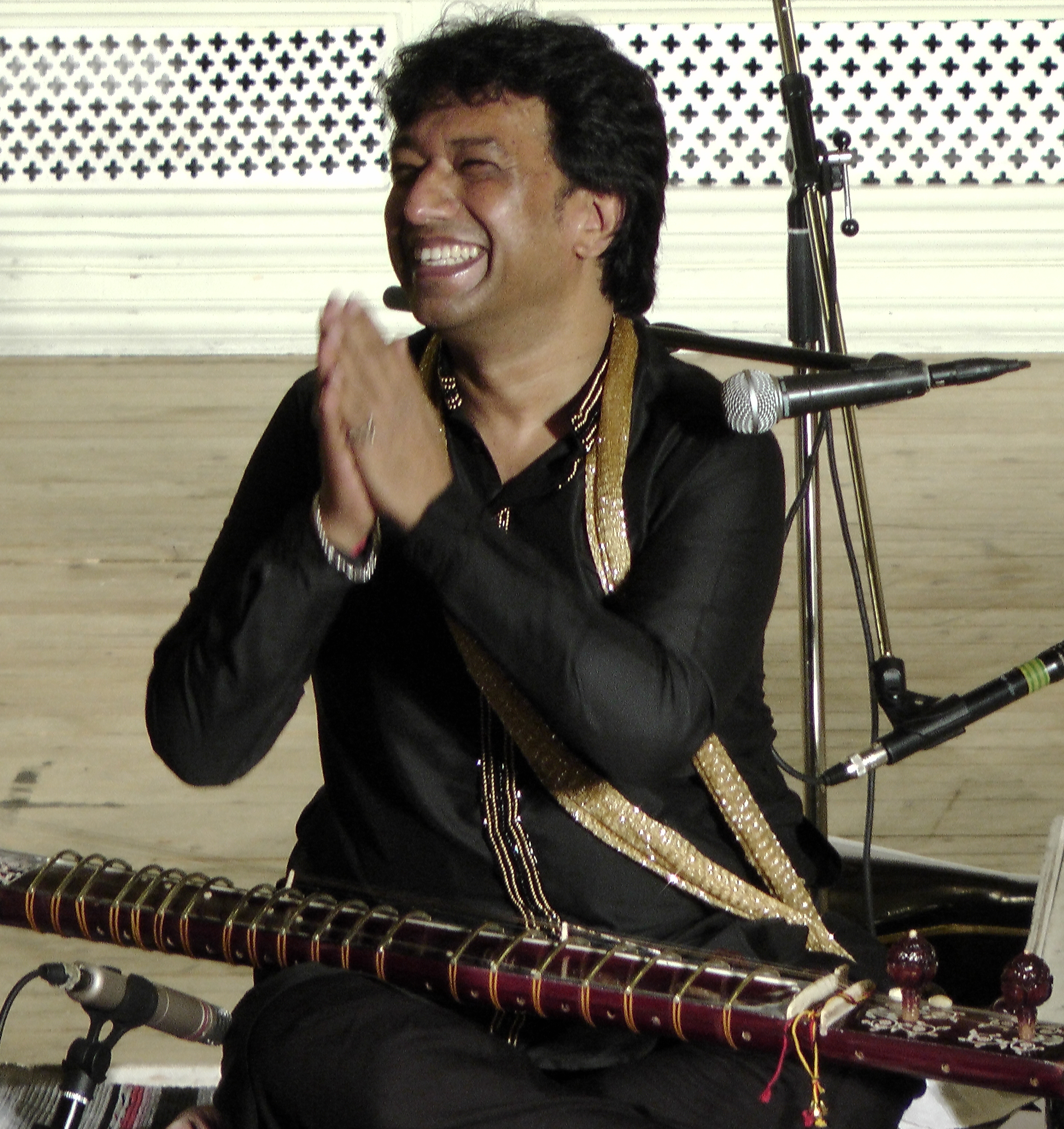
- Khan at the 8th Intercultural Festival, "Sitar in Petersburg", St. Petersburg State Academic Capella, 2015

Background information
- Born: 1959 (age 66–67); Dharwad, Karnataka, India
- Genres: Hindustani classical
- Occupation: Musician
- Instrument: Sitar

Chhote Rahimat Khan (born 1959), is an Indian Hindustani classical sitar player of the Bande Ali Khan (beenkar) school (Gharana). He was taught by his father, Abdul Karim Khan, and grandfather, Ratna Rahimat Khan, as well as his older brothers. Khan is the elder brother of Bale Khan and younger twin brothers, Shafique Khan and Rafique Khan, both sitarists.

Belonging to the seventh generation of musicians from Dharwad, he received the majority of his training from his father, Ustad Abdul Karim Khan, although he has also benefited from the influence of his grandfather, Sitar Ratna Rahimat Khan (born 1863). Ratna Rahimat Khan, a disciple of master, Ustad Bande Ali Khan, was a rudra vina and sitar player who was responsible not only for modifying the three-string sitar to the seven-string instrument that we have today, but also for reunifying the instrumental khyal of the Gwalior gharana with the instrumental dhrupad of Gwalior. It is this legacy that gives his music a unique and distinctive colour. His music is a sonorous blend of both Gayaki Ang, which aims to imitate the tonal nuance of the human voice on the instrument, and Tantakari Ang, the more traditional instrumental style played on the instrument.

== Recognition and achievements ==
He secured second prize in the All India Radio Music Competition held in Dharwad in 1978, at the age of 19, and also won the first award in the preliminary and final round of the Yuva Sangeet Nrithya Mahotsav organized by the South Central Zone Cultural Centre at Nagpur on 6 October 1987. He is a regular artist on AIR Dharwad and AIR Panaji, Goa.

== Music direction ==
He is also a music director. He scored music to Vadhachakra, the first Marathi film of Goa, in 1992, and also to Tulsi, a Konkani Tele Film, in 1994. He has also scored live music for one of Kālidāsa’s plays, Abhidnyan Shakuntal, staged by Prof. Kamalakar Sonatakke, on 16 and 17 December 2005.

== Current position ==
Ustad Chhote Rahimat Khan has been the Head of the Sitar Faculty at Kala Academy in Goa for several years now, and has also given public performances in numerous festivals in Asia and in Europe. Besides many concerts in India, he has performed in the UK, Portugal, China, France, Finland, Malaysia and Singapore. He is a recognised 'Top' graded artist of the All India Radio.
