= Rajiv Vijay Raghavan =

Indian director and producer

- Born: 29 May 1958 (age 68); Kottayam
- Education: Film and Television Institute of India
- Occupations: Film director, screenwriter, producer
- Years active: 1981–present

Rajiv Vijay Raghavan (born 29 May 1958) is an Indian director, script writer, and producer. His debut feature film was Margam. He has also made a number of documentaries. He is an alumnus of the Film & TV Institute of India, Pune, and assisted G. Aravindan.

== Life ==
Rajiv Vijay Raghavan was born on 29 May 1958 in Kottayam, Kerala, South-western India.

He was active in politics and literature in his college days at Kottayam and was a council member of the University Students Union of Kerala University during 1977–78. After graduating in commerce, he joined the Film & TV Institute of India, Pune, during 1979–81.

Raghavan took a job in Canara Bank in 1981 and worked there for 10 years. He became closely acquainted with G. Aravindan and assisted him on six feature films during 1981–1991. Raghavan's debut documentary film, Sister Alphonsa of Bharananganam (1986), which portrays the life of Saint Alphonsa (Sister Alphonsa then), won the National Film Award for best biographical documentary. After resigning from Canara Bank, Raghavan worked as a producer in the Centre for Development of Imaging Technology, Kerala (C-DIT) during 1991-98 and made documentaries such as Kesari (1992), Ruin of the Commons (1993), Nirmithi (1994), and Seeds of Malabar (1996). On 2003, under the banner of Image commune, a collective founded for the sake of promoting independent films, he made his milestone film, Margam (The Path).

== Filmography ==
Raghavan assisted director G. Aravindan on six feature films during 1981–91. He directed nine documentaries and short films, including Sister Alphonsa of Bharananganam (1987), People Matter-Women's rights in India (1988), Kesari (1992), Ruin of the Commons (1993), Nirmithi (1994), Seeds of Malabar (1996) and Building the Bridge - a Story of Gender Equity (2000). He also directed the feature film Margam.

=== Sister Alphonsa of Bharananganam ===
Sister Alphonsa of Bharananganam is about a nun from Kerala who would have been declared the first Catholic saint from India in 2009. The print of the film was recovered a few days before the declaration ceremony in Rome and was screened during the holy event.

=== Margam ===
Margam, Raghavan's debut feature film, is an adaptation of Pithrutharppanam by M. Sukumaran. The film won seven major Kerala State Film Awards of the Government of Kerala, and one National Film Award (Indira Gandhi Award for Best Debut Film of a Director) in 2003. Margam participated in 16 international film festivals and won six international awards in categories including best film and scripting.

The script co-written by Raghavan, Anvar Ali and S P Ramesh; the cinematography by Venu; and the roles performed by Nedumudi Venu and Meera Krishna were also appreciated.
