= Mannu =

- Directed by: K. G. George
- Written by: Dr. Pavithran
- Starring: Soman; P. K. Abraham; Sharada; Sukumaran
- Cinematography: Ramachandra Babu
- Edited by: Ravi
- Music by: A. T. Ummer
- Production company: Susmitha Productions
- Distributed by: Vijaya Movies
- Release date: 6 October 1978
- Running time: 134 minutes
- Country: India
- Language: Malayalam

Mannu (English: The Soil) is a 1978 Malayalam film directed by K. G. George with Soman, P. K. Abraham, Sharada and Sukumaran in the lead roles. The feudal melodrama about greed & superstition narrates a tale of the struggle of the poor Damu (Soman) & his wife (Sharada) against the powerful landlord (P. K. Abraham) over tenancy rights.

== Cast ==
- M. G. Soman as Damu
- P. K. Abraham as Krishnan Nair
- Sharada as Paru, Damu's wife
- Sukumaran as Rajan, Krishnan Nair's son
- Adoor Bhasi as Supran Thirumeni
- Nellikkodu Bhaskaran as Mulankadan
- Kuthiravattom Pappu as Keshavan
- Mallika Sukumaran as Naani
- Kunjandi as Kakka
- Santha Devi as Krishnan's mother
- Nilambur Balan as Velappan
- Sreenivasan as Mathai
- R. K. Nair as Raghavan

== Soundtrack ==
The music was composed by A. T. Ummer and the lyrics were written by Dr Pavithran.

No.	Song	Singers	Lyrics	Length (m:ss)
1	"Akalangalile"	K. J. Yesudas	Dr. Pavithran	
2	"Devi Bhagavathi"	P Susheela, K. P. Brahmanandan, Selma George	Dr. Pavithran	
3	"Evideyo Thakaraaru"	K. J. Yesudas, P. Jayachandran	Dr. Pavithran	
4	"Kunnin Meloru"	P. Susheela	Dr. Pavithran	

== Additional information ==
The film is based on Dr. Pavithran's play of the same name.
