= Urukku Manushyan =

- Directed by: Crossbelt Mani
- Starring: Ratheesh; Sathaar; Jayamalini; Kuthiravattam Pappu
- Music by: Guna Singh
- Release date: 17 January 1986
- Country: India
- Language: Malayalam

Urukku Manushyan is a 1986 Indian Malayalam film, directed by Crossbelt Mani. The film stars Ratheesh, Sathaar, Jayamalini and Kuthiravattam Pappu in the lead roles. The film has musical score by Guna Singh.

== Cast ==
- Ratheesh
- Sathaar
- Jayamalini
- Kuthiravattam Pappu
- Silk Smitha

== Soundtrack ==
The music was composed by Guna Singh and the lyrics were written by Bharanikkavu Sivakumar.

| No. | Song | Singers | Lyrics | Length (m:ss) |
|---|---|---|---|---|
| 1 | "Ragam Paadi" | Lathika | Bharanikkavu Sivakumar | |
| 2 | "Vaarmazhavil" | Jolly Abraham, Lathika | Bharanikkavu Sivakumar | |
