= Margam (film) =

Indian film by Rajiv Vijay Raghavan

- Directed by: Rajiv Vijay Raghavan
- Written by: Rajiv Vijay Raghavan; Anvar Ali; S.P. Ramesh
- Based on: Pithruthorponom by M. Sukumaran
- Produced by: Rajiv Vijay Raghavan
- Starring: Nedumudi Venu; Meera Krishna; Shobha Mohan
- Cinematography: Venu
- Edited by: Beena Paul
- Music by: Isaac Thomas Kottukapally
- Release date: 16 December 2003 (IFFK)
- Running time: 108 minutes
- Country: India
- Language: Malayalam

Margam (meaning: the path) is an Indian film co-written, directed and produced by Rajiv Vijay Raghavan under the banner of Image commune. The film is an adaptation of Pithrutharppanam, the famous story by M. Sukumaran. Margam won seven major Kerala State Film Awards from the government of Kerala and one National Film Award from the government of India in 2003. One of the rarest Malayalam films that received wider critical acclaim at international level, Margam was exhibited at 16 international film festivals and won six international awards in categories including best film and scripting. The script was co-written by Rajiv Vijay Raghavan, Anvar Ali and Dr. S P Ramesh. Cinematography was by Venu and the roles performed by Nedumudi Venu and Meera Krishna were also widely appreciated.

== Plot ==
The film tells the story of a revolutionary who, years later, realises that his efforts have been wasted and witnesses the ill-fate of his co-rebels and leads a secluded life in a state of clinical depression.

== Cast ==
- Nedumudi Venu as Venukumara Menon, the protagonist. A former militant communist revolutionary, now living a secluded life as a "parallel college" lecturer.
- Meera Krishna as Prakrithi, Menon's daughter
- Shobha Mohan as Elisabeth, Menon's wife
- K. P. A. C. Lalitha Menon's sister
- Valsala Menon Menon's aunt
- Madambu Kunjukuttan
- V K Sreeraman
- Madhupal
- P. Sreekumar

== Awards ==
National Film Awards

- Indira Gandhi Award for Best Debut Film of a Director - Rajiv Vijay Raghavan
- Special jury mention - Nedumudi Venu

Kerala State Film Awards

- Kerala State Film Award for Best Film
- Kerala State Film Award for Best Screenplay - Rajiv Vijay Raghavan, Anvar Ali and S. P. Ramesh
- Kerala State Film Award for Best Actor - Nedumudi Venu
- Kerala State Film Award (Special Jury Award) - Meera Krishna
- Kerala State Film Award for Best Cinematography - Venu
- Kerala State Film Award for Best Background Music - Issac Thomas Kottukapally
- Kerala State Film Award for Best Sound Recordist - N. Harikumar

Fajr Film Festival, Tehran, Iran

- Asian Competition - Best Script - Rajiv Vijay Raghavan, Anvar Ali and S. P. Ramesh

Zanzibar International Film Festival, Zanzibar

- "Golden Dhow" - Best film

The South Soth Film Encounter, Asilah, Morocco

- "Golden Waves" - Best Script Rajiv Vijay Raghavan, Anvar Ali and S. P. Ramesh

Cine Pobre Film Festival, Cuba

- Special Jury Prize for the film
- Best Actor prize Nedumudi Venu

International Film Festival of Kerala, India

- FIPRESCI Special Mention - Margam
