= Ambada Njaane! =

1985 film

- Directed by: Antony Eastman
- Written by: Nedumudi Venu
- Screenplay by: Antony Eastman
- Produced by: M.S.Ravi for Ramya Productions
- Starring: Shankar; Menaka; Nedumudi Venu; Thilakan; KPAC Lalitha; Lalu Alex; Kunchan; Paravoor Bharathan
- Cinematography: Vipin Mohan
- Edited by: G Murali
- Music by: M. K. Arjunan
- Release date: 1985
- Country: India
- Language: Malayalam

Ambada Njaane! is a 1985 Indian Malayalam-language film, directed by Antony Eastman and produced by M.S.Ravi for Ramya Productions. The film stars Shankar, Menaka, Nedumudi Venu, Thilakan and KPAC Lalitha in lead roles.

== Cast ==
- Shankar as Kutti Krishnan
- Menaka as Devayani
- Nedumudi Venu Kutty Krishnan's grandfather
- Thilakan as Padmanabhan aka Pappan
- KPAC Lalitha as Ammini, Kutty Krishnan' mother
- Lalu Alex as Peethambaran
- Kunchan as Arjunan, Devayani's brother
- Paravoor Bharathan
