= Jamal Kochangadi =

Indian writer and music journalist (born 1944)

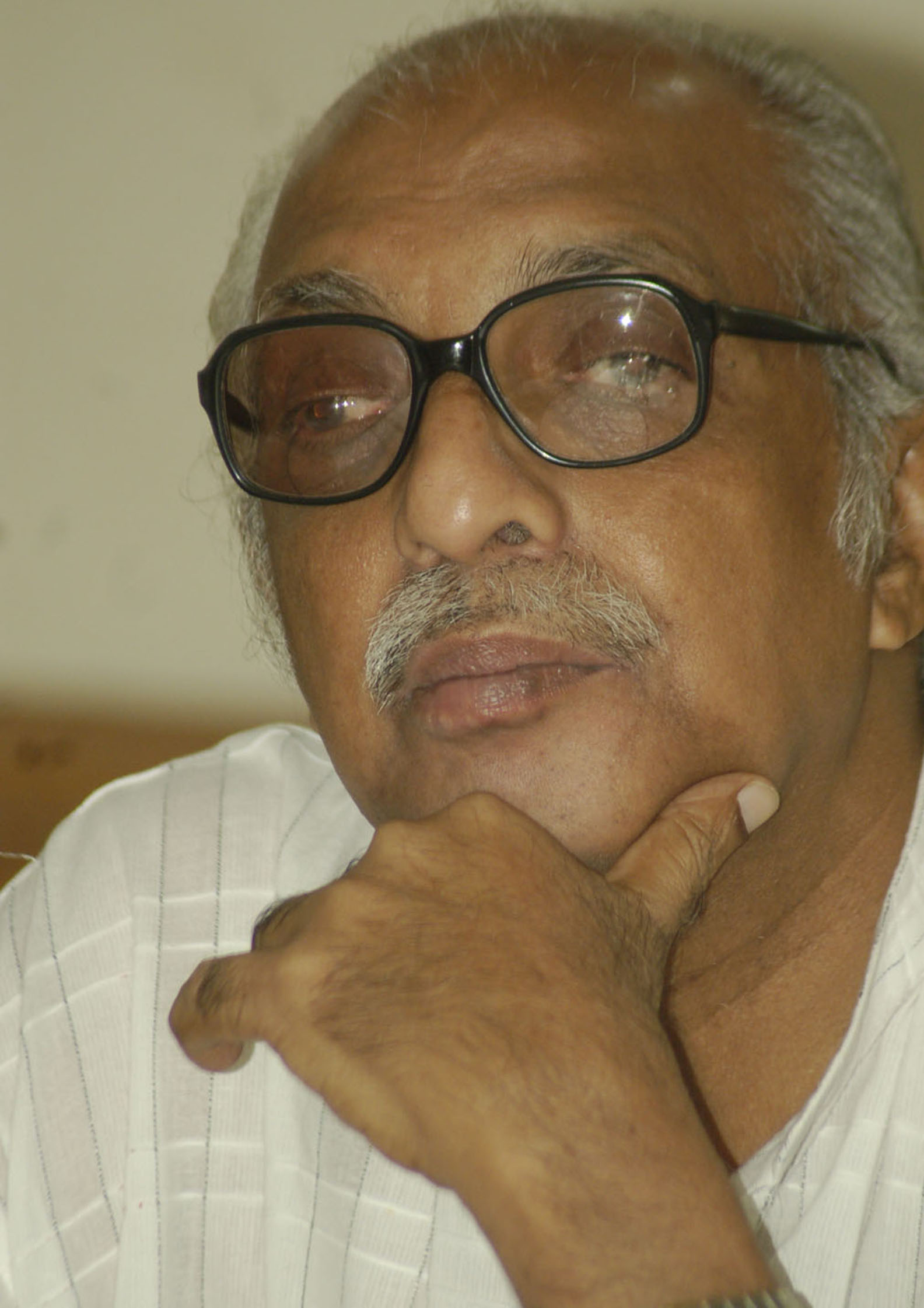
- Born: P Z Mohamad Jamal; 30 April 1944 (age 81); Kochangadi, Kochi Kerala India
- Occupations: Journalist, Lyricist, Author
- Years active: 1963–present

Jamal Kochangadi is an Indian writer, script writer, lyricist and music journalist.

== Early life ==
Kochangadi was born on 30 April 1944 in Kochangadi, in the Ernakulam district of Kerala. His parents were P.A. Zainuddhin Naina (Freedom fighter, journalist, political leader, founder of Coir Fed) and Sulekha.

== Career ==
After completing school in 1963, he joined Kerala Nadam, an evening newspaper, eventually becoming the Chief Editor of the Bharatharajyam Evening Newspaper. Then he worked in a couple of small newspapers in Kochi like Yuva Keralam, Jai Hind, Cochin Express and a weekly named Film Nadam. From 1980 onwards he held positions in news dailies such as League Times, Madhyamam, and Thejus. From 1988 to 2018 he was in charge of the Special Edition of newspapers. He became the editor of Varadya Madhyamam and Thejus Sunday Edition.

His short story Chappa was made into a feature film of the same name, directed by P. A. Backer. The film was released in 1982 and won the National Film Award for Best Feature Film in Malayalam.

== Literary works ==
=== Short stories ===
- Anjum Moonnum Onnu- Short story collection, written in 1961, when he was a final year student at school in association with Late MJ Zackaria Sait (former Deputy Speaker of Kerala)

=== Translation ===
- Hitlarude Manass (Mind of Hitler)
- Marubhumiyile Pravachakan (Prophet of the Desert)
- Classic Abhimukhangal (Classic Interviews)
- Dhyanam Islamil (Contemplation in Islam)
- Columusum mattu yathrikarum (Columbus and other travelers.)

=== Biography ===
- Latha Mangeshkar- Music and Life,
- Luminaries of World Literature (Brief biographical notes on 150 world known writers)
- From Tansen to Zakir Hussain (Biographies of Musical legends)
- Melody (Biosketches of 40 Hindi film singers and Composers)

=== As editor ===
- Baburaj (An anthology of music composer MS Baburaj)
- Kerala Samskraram – Adanapradanangal (Collection of studies on Kerala Culture)

=== Fiction ===
- Sfadikam Pole (Like a crystal)
- Nilavinte Sangeetham (Music of moonlight)

=== Collection of Social Essays ===
- Manpazham thinnu maricha kutty, akathalam, sthree kudumbam, kuttikal

=== Memoirs ===
- Pena Sakshi (Pen as witness) Memories of media life through letter communication with eminent persons.
- Ithente Kochi (This is my Cochi) Memories of Cochin
- Basheer, Vijayan, Mammootty pinne mattu chilarum. Memories of Vaikom Muhammad Basheer, O. V. Vijayan, Mammootty and other well known dignitaries.

=== Play ===
- Iniyum Unarathavar (Kozhikode Sangamam Theatres)
- Kshubhitharude Ashamsakal (Stage India, Kozhikode)

=== Interviews ===
Sathyam Parayunna Nunayanmaar- (Liars who tells truth) Interviews with cartoonists from Kerala like O. V. Vijayan, Kutty (cartoonist), E. P. Unny etc.,

=== Songs ===
- Pravachana ganangal - Musical Album on Prophet Muhammad
- Marakkillorikalum

== As lyricist ==
Year	Song	Film	Singers
1980	Aa Churam Ee Churam	Thaliritta Kinakkal	K. J. Yesudas, Vani Jairam
1980	En Mooka Vishadham	Thaliritta Kinakkal	S. Janaki
1983	En Manassil (F)	Marakkillorikkalum	Vani Jairam
1983	En Manassil (M)	Marakkillorikkalum	P. Jayachandran

=== Awards ===
- Thiruvananthapuram Muslim Association Puraskaram
- P.A. Sayed Mohammad Foundation Award
- P.A. Backer Puraskaram
- J.C.Kuttikad Award
- Kozhikode Souhrida Puraskaram
- Vakkam Abdul Khader Smaraka Puraskaram (Trivandrum)
- Qatar Thanathu Samskarika Vedi Puraskaram
