= Marakkillorikkalum =

- Directed by: Fazil
- Screenplay by: Fazil; S. L. Puram Sadanandan (dialogues)
- Story by: Fazil
- Starring: Prem Nazir; Shankar; Mohanlal; Ambika
- Cinematography: Ramachandra Babu
- Edited by: T. R. Shekhar
- Music by: Zero Babu
- Production company: Amoolya Films
- Distributed by: Raj Pictures
- Release date: 7 October 1983
- Country: India
- Language: Malayalam

Marakkillorikkalum (transl. Will never forget) is a 1983 Indian Malayalam-language drama film written and directed by Fazil, with dialogues written by S. L. Puram Sadanandan. It stars Prem Nazir, Shankar, Mohanlal, and Ambika in the lead roles. The film has musical score by Zero Babu.

== Plot ==
Pradeep (Shankar) and Suma (Ambika) are in love. Suma lives a fine life until she meets Murali (Mohanlal). Murali is a ruthless bully who tries to rape Suma. Madhavan Thampi and Pradeep defeat him in a fight and he never comes back. Pradeep and Suma have an affection toward each other. The film ends with Madhavan Thampi leaving Pradeep and Suma to live alone.

== Cast ==
- Prem Nazir as Madhavan Thampi
- Mohanlal as Murali
- Shankar as Pradeep
- Ambika as Suma
- Kaviyoor Ponnamma as Sharada
- Jagannatha Varma as Kesavan Nampoothiri
- Alummoodan as Gopi
- Poornima Bhagyaraj as Archana
- Mammootty as Man at the park (uncredited)
- Ansar Kalabhavan as Murali's friend
- Dominic Alummoodan as Gopi

== Soundtrack ==
The music was composed by Zero Babu and the lyrics were written by Jamal Kochangadi and Bichu Thirumala.

No.	Song	Singers	Lyrics	Length
1	"En Manassil" (F)	Vani Jairam	Jamal Kochangadi	
2	"En Manassil" (M)	P. Jayachandran	Jamal Kochangadi	
3	"Nakshathrangal Chimmum"	P. Jayachandran, Vani Jairam	Bichu Thirumala	
