= Cross Belt (film) =

- Poster
- Directed by: Crossbelt Mani
- Written by: N. N. Pillai
- Produced by: A. Ponnappan
- Starring: Sathyan; Sharada; Kaviyoor Ponnamma; Adoor Bhasi
- Cinematography: E. N. Balakrishnan
- Edited by: T. R. Sreenivasalu
- Music by: M. S. Baburaj
- Production company: Deepthi Films
- Distributed by: Deepthi Films
- Release date: 28 November 1970
- Country: India
- Language: Malayalam

Cross Belt is a 1970 Indian Malayalam-language film, directed by Crossbelt Mani and produced by A. Ponnappan. The film stars Sathyan, Sharada, Kaviyoor Ponnamma and Adoor Bhasi. The film had musical score by M. S. Baburaj.

== Cast ==
- Sathyan as Rajasekharan Nair
- Sharada as Ammu
- Kaviyoor Ponnamma as Bhavani
- Adoor Bhasi as Sahasram Iyer
- Thikkurissy Sukumaran Nair as Krishnan Thambi
- P. J. Antony as Sekhara Panicker
- Aranmula Ponnamma as Ammukutty Amma
- Bahadoor as Thilakan
- Kottarakkara Sreedharan Nair
- Kottayam Chellappan as Daniel
- N. Govindankutty
- Paravoor Bharathan as Narayana Pilla
- Ushakumari as Leelamani

== Soundtrack ==
The music was composed by M. S. Baburaj and the lyrics were written by Sreekumaran Thampi.

No.	Song	Singers	Lyrics	Length (m:ss)
1	"Kaalam Maari Varum"	K. J. Yesudas	Sreekumaran Thampi	
2	"Kaalam Maari Varum" (Scene II)	K. J. Yesudas	Sreekumaran Thampi	
3	"Zindabaad"	K. J. Yesudas, Raveendran, C. O. Anto	Sreekumaran Thampi	
