= Puthrakameshti =

- Directed by: Crossbelt Mani
- Written by: Kadavoor Chandran Pillai
- Screenplay by: Kadavoor Chandran Pillai
- Starring: Madhu; Sheela; Kaviyoor Ponnamma; Adoor Bhasi
- Cinematography: T. N. Krishnankutty Nair
- Edited by: Chakrapani
- Music by: V. Dakshinamoorthy
- Production company: Pan Chithra
- Distributed by: Pan Chithra
- Release date: 10 November 1972
- Country: India
- Language: Malayalam

Puthrakameshti is a 1972 Indian Malayalam film, directed by Crossbelt Mani. The film stars Madhu, Sheela, Kaviyoor Ponnamma and Adoor Bhasi in the lead roles. The film had musical score by V. Dakshinamoorthy.

== Cast ==
- Madhu
- Sheela
- Kaviyoor Ponnamma
- Adoor Bhasi
- Prema
- Bahadoor
- Meena
- Rani Chandra
- Vanchiyoor Radha
- Veeran

== Soundtrack ==
The music was composed by V. Dakshinamoorthy and the lyrics were written by Vayalar Ramavarma.

| No. | Song | Singers | Lyrics | Length (m:ss) |
|---|---|---|---|---|
| 1 | "Chandrikaa Charchithamaam" | K. P. Brahmanandan | Vayalar Ramavarma | |
| 2 | "Enikku Melammo" | K. J. Yesudas, P. Leela, Chorus, Adoor Pankajam | Vayalar Ramavarma | |
| 3 | "Maasam Madhumaasam" | S. Janaki | Vayalar Ramavarma | |
| 4 | "Ormakale" | P. Susheela | Vayalar Ramavarma | |
| 5 | "Thottu Maraname" | K. J. Yesudas | Vayalar Ramavarma | |
