= Shafique Khan =

Indian sitarist

Ustad Shafique Khan
- Born: 30 June 1968 (age 58); Dharwad, India
- Genres: Hindustani Classical
- Occupations: Musician, Sitar Player

Shafique Khan (born 30 June 1968) is an Indian musician and sitar player from the Dharwad Gharana.

== Early life and education ==
Khan is the younger brother of sitarists Ustad Bale Khan and Chhote Rahimat Khan. His twin brother, Rafique Khan, is also a sitarist and composer.

== Musical style ==
Khan's playing style incorporates elements associated with the sitar traditions of his mentors. It combines aspects of Gaayaki Ang (vocal-style phrasing) and Tantakari Ang (instrumental technique).

== Achievements ==
Khan been conferred with Surmani award by Swami Haridas Sangeet Sammelan Mumbai. Kala Vikas Parishat has honoured him by conferring Bharat Ratna Pandit Bhimsen Joshi National Award in 2016. His Musical sojourn has taken him to Germany and United States.

Sitar Jugalbandi performances with his twin brother Rafique Khan have won encomium from music lovers.

== Current position ==
Shafique Khan currently works at All India Radio as top Grade Artist, Dharwad Karnataka.
