= Vayal =

- Directed by: Antony Eastman
- Written by: Kaloor Dennis
- Screenplay by: Kaloor Dennis
- Produced by: N. V. Mathew
- Starring: Kaviyoor Ponnamma; Sankaradi; Shubha; Cochin Haneefa
- Cinematography: C. Ramachandra Menon
- Edited by: N. P. Suresh
- Music by: G. Devarajan
- Production company: Arpana Films
- Distributed by: Arpana Films
- Release date: 17 July 1981
- Country: India
- Language: Malayalam

Vayal is a 1981 Indian Malayalam film, directed by Antony Eastman and produced by N. V. Mathew. The film stars Kaviyoor Ponnamma, Sankaradi, Shubha and Cochin Haneefa in the lead roles. The film has musical score by G. Devarajan.

== Cast ==
- Kaviyoor Ponnamma as Saraswathi
- Sankaradi as Kaimal
- Shubha as Karthu
- Cochin Haneefa as Paappi
- Jalaja as Nandinikutty
- Kuthiravattam Pappu as Sankunni
- M. G. Soman as Govindankutty
- Mala Aravindan as Naanu Nair
- Silk Smitha as Parvathi
- T. G. Ravi as Vaasu
- Sukumari as Savithri
- Santo Krishnan as Gunda
- Benny parankimala as Unni
- Joseph E. A. as Venu
- Sunitha (New) as Ponnamma

== Soundtrack ==
The music was composed by G. Devarajan and the lyrics were written by R. K. Damodaran.

No.	Song	Singers	Lyrics	Length (m:ss)
1	"Onnaanaam Kandathil"	P. Madhuri	R. K. Damodaran	
2	"Varna Mayilvaahanathil"	K. J. Yesudas, Chorus	R. K. Damodaran	
