= Chuvanna Vithukal =

- Directed by: P. A. Backer
- Written by: P. A. Backer
- Screenplay by: P. A. Backer
- Produced by: Salam Karassery
- Starring: Nilambur Balan; Kunjava; Nilambur Ayisha; Santha Devi
- Cinematography: Vipin Das
- Edited by: Ravi
- Production company: Navadhara Movie Makers
- Distributed by: Navadhara Movie Makers
- Release date: 31 March 1978
- Country: India
- Language: Malayalam

Chuvanna Vithukal (English: Red Seedlings) is a 1978 Indian Malayalam socio-political film, directed by P. A. Backer and produced by Salam Karassery. The film stars Santhakumari (Malayalam actress), Nilambur Balan, Kunjava, Nilambur Ayisha and Santha Devi in lead roles. It won the Kerala State Film Award for Best Actress for Santhakumari (Malayalam actress), as well sa the Kerala State Award for the Second Best Film.

== Cast ==
- Nilambur Balan
- Kunjava
- Nilambur Ayisha
- Santha Devi
- Santhakumari (Malayalam actress)
- Zeenath in her debut role
- T. Abdul Rahman

== Additional information ==
T. Abdul Rahman (aka Olympian Rahman), a footballer who represented India at the Melbourne Summer Olympics, has a role in this movie.
