= Crossbelt Mani =

Indian film director and cinematographer (1935–2021)

- Born: K. Velayudhan Nair; 22 April 1935; Thiruvananthapuram, Kingdom of Travancore, British India (present day Kerala, India)
- Died: 30 October 2021 (aged 86); Thiruvananthapuram, Kerala, India
- Occupations: Film director; Cinematographer
- Years active: 1968 – 1990
- Spouse: Sreemathiyamma
- Children: 2
- Parents: Krishna Pillai; Kamalamma

K. Velayudhan Nair, better known by his stage name Crossbelt Mani (22 April 1935 – 30 October 2021), was an Indian film director and cinematographer, who worked in Malayalam cinema. He directed more than 40 Malayalam movies and worked as a cinematographer for ten movies. He became popular with his second movie Cross Belt in 1970 and added Crossbelt as part of his name. Veteran director Joshiy worked as an assistant director under him.

== Personal life ==
Velayudhan Nair with the stage name Crossbelt Mani hailed from Thiruvananthapuram. He was born to Valiyashalayil Madhavivilasathu Krishna Pillai and Kamalamma on 22 April 1935. He was married to Iranayil Bhagavathimandirathu Sreemathiyamma. They had a son, Krishnakumar, and a daughter, Roopa.

Mani died on 30 October 2021, at the age of 86 at his home in Thiruvananthapuram. He was suffering from various illnesses associated with old age at the time of his death.

== Filmography ==
=== Direction ===
- Midumidukki (1968)
- Cross Belt (1970)
- Manushyabandhangal (1972)
- Puthrakameshti (1972)
- Naadan Premam (1972)
- Shakthi (1972)
- Kaapaalika (1973)
- Nadeenadanmaare Aavasyamundu (1974)
- Velicham Akale (1975)
- Penpada (1975)
- Kuttichaathan (1975)
- Thaamarathoni (1975)
- Chottaanikkara Amma (1976)
- Yudhabhoomi (1976)
- Neethipeedham (1977)
- Penpuli (1977)
- Pattaalam Janaki (1977)
- Aanayum Ambaariyum (1978)
- Black Belt (1978)
- Pancharathnam (1979)
- Youvanam Daaham (1980)
- Eettappuli (1983)
- Thimingalam (1983)
- Bullet (1984)
- Chorakku Chora (1985)
- Black Mail (1985)
- Revenge (1985)
- Ottayan (1985)
- Kulambadikal (1986)
- Pensimham (1986)
- Urukkumanushyan (1986)
- Naaradan Keralathil (1987)
- Devadas (1989)
- Commander (1990)

=== Cinematography ===
- Bullet (1984)
- Chorakku Chora (1985)
- Black Mail (1985)
- Revenge (1985)
- Ottayan (1985)
- Kulambadikal (1986)
- Urukkumanushyan (1986)
- Naaradan Keralathil (1987)
- Commander (1990)
