= Kirathakudu =

- Theatrical release poster
- Directed by: A. Kodandarami Reddy
- Written by: G. Satyamurthy
- Produced by: Lingaraju
- Starring: Chiranjeevi; Suhasini; Jaggayya; Silk Smitha; S. V. Krishna Reddy
- Cinematography: Lok Singh
- Edited by: Kotagiri Venkateswara Rao
- Music by: Ilaiyaraaja
- Release date: 1 January 1986
- Running time: 146 minutes
- Country: India
- Language: Telugu
- Budget: 22 lakhs

Kirathakudu is a 1986 Telugu-language crime film directed by A. Kodandarami Reddy. The film stars Chiranjeevi, Suhasini, Silk Smitha and Jaggayya.

This story is based on an idea that, by 1995–2000, the number of criminals in the country would drastically increase and the government could not maintain the prisons. It demarcates some of the areas as crime zones and builds a protection around them. It is adapted from the 1981 film Escape From New York.

== Plot ==
Charan hates his father to the core and does not support him even when he is being destroyed. Chakravarthy, who is a CBI officer, is nominated to the Interpol and his son Charan (Chiranjeevi) is a reputed sportsman, but there is no love between them. Charan spends his life with friends and alcohol to overcome his loneliness.

Dharmateja (Gummadi) is an honest police officer. His daughter Swetha (Suhasini), who is doing research in criminology gets acquainted with Charan. Swetha falls in love with Charan during this process and changes Charan into a caring person.

Chakravarthy is trying to eliminate the notorious criminal gang led by Snake (Kannada Prabhakar).

Meanwhile, Snake and his men, who are enemies of Chakravarti, try every possible method to destroy him and falsely incriminate him in a murder case. Police are after Chakravarti and Charan doesn't care about helping his father out.

In the end, Chakravarthy is kidnapped by Snake, but Charan, with help from Swetha rescues him and hands Snake over to the police.

== Cast ==
- Chiranjeevi as Charan
- Suhasini as Swetha
- Jaggayya as Chakravarthy
- Allu Ramalingaiah
- Nutan Prasad
- Kannada Prabhakar as Snake
- Silk Smitha as Hamsa
- Gummadi as Dharmateja
- Annapoorna
- Manik Irani as Fighter in the ring
- Chalapathi Rao
- Prithvi

== Soundtrack ==
All songs composed by Maestro Ilaiyaraaja

Song	Playback Singers	Lyricist	Picturised on	Length
"Nanneelokam Rammanaledu"	S. P. Balasubrahmanyam	Acharya Aatreya	Chiranjeevi	5:03
"Nee Pere Pranayama"	S. P. Balasubrahmanyam & S. Janaki	Veturi	Chiranjeevi & Suhasini	4:19
"Sampenga Muddu"	S. P. Balasubrahmanyam & S. Janaki	Veturi	Chiranjeevi & Suhasini	4:20
"Oka Muddu Chalu"	S. P. Balasubrahmanyam & S. Janaki	Rajasri	Chiranjeevi & Suhasini	3:59
"Nee Moogaveenai Mogena"	S. Janaki	Acharya Aatreya	Chiranjeevi & Suhasini	4:40
"Akasam Bhumi Kalise"	S. Janaki	Acharya Aatreya	Silk Smitha, Chiranjeevi etc.	3:54
