= Sikharangal =

- Directed by: Sheela
- Written by: Padmarajan; Dr. Pavithran (dialogues)
- Screenplay by: Dr. Pavithran
- Produced by: A. Sheriff
- Starring: Jayan; Sheela; T. R. Omana
- Cinematography: Melli Irani
- Edited by: Radhakrishnan
- Music by: K. J. Joy
- Production company: Grace Films
- Distributed by: Grace Films
- Release date: 21 February 1979
- Country: India
- Language: Malayalam

Sikharangal is a 1979 Indian Malayalam film, directed by Sheela The film stars Jayan, Sheela, Sukumari and T. R. Omana in the lead roles. The film has musical score by K. J. Joy.

== Plot ==
Savitri (Sheela) is devastated when she learns that her boyfriend Ramesh (Jayan) is a married man. She leaves him and returns home. He pursues her there but Savitri and her mother had already left for her uncle's place and he has no way of tracking her further. There Savitri gives birth to a baby girl who is given out for adoption by her mother and uncle. She's convinced that the baby had been born dead and is soon persuaded to marry the rich Surendran. They lead a happy married life and soon Savitri has another child, this time a baby boy. Meanwhile, Ramesh can't stop pining for Savitri and can't reconcile with his wife. The unhappy marriage is brought to an end as she dies. Savitri's first child Thulasi grows up mistreated in her adopted household. Adoor Bhasi inveigles her into Savitri's household as the baby's nanny and soon Savitri learns the truth and he starts blackmailing her. It is at this juncture that Ramesh finds Savitri again. He stubbornly refuses to consider the fact that she has moved on and is happy with her current life. An accidental shuffle results in Savitri hitting him over the head and wounding him. She abandons him in his car at an isolated location. To her utter dismay he's rescued by her husband Surendran, who is his old friend and brought home to recuperate. Ramesh sadly accepts the status quo and is about to leave after dealing with Savitri's blackmailer. That's when Surendran learns the truth about his wife and Ramesh from the Anglo Indian couple with whom Savitri had been staying while she was in love with Ramesh. Surendran is furious and about to abandon Savitri when she tells the last truth, and Ramesh makes the most unselfish gesture of his life.

== Cast ==
- Jayan as Ramesh
- Sheela as Savitri
- Sukumari
- T. R. Omana
- Bahadoor
- Kanakadurga as Ramesh's wife
- Ravichandran as Surendran

== Soundtrack ==
The music was composed by K. J. Joy and the lyrics were written by Dr. Pavithran.

No.	Song	Singers	Lyrics	Length (m:ss)
1	"Ammayilla Achanilla"	B. Vasantha, Jency	Dr. Pavithran	
2	"Ninakku Njaan Swantham"	S. Janaki	Dr. Pavithran	
