= Eettappuli =

- Directed by: Crossbelt Mani
- Written by: Cheri Viswanath
- Screenplay by: Cheri Viswanath
- Starring: Shankar; Ambika; Balan K. Nair; Silk Smitha
- Cinematography: E. N. Balakrishnan
- Edited by: Chakrapani
- Music by: G. Devarajan
- Production company: Rose Enterprises
- Distributed by: Rose Enterprises
- Release date: 12 August 1983
- Country: India
- Language: Malayalam

Eettappuli is a 1983 Indian Malayalam film, directed by Crossbelt Mani. The film stars Shankar, Ambika, Balan K. Nair and Silk Smitha in the lead roles. The film has musical score by G. Devarajan.

== Cast ==
- Shankar as Khabeer
- Ambika as Padmavathi
- K. P. Ummer as Pareed
- Balan K. Nair as Sekharan
- Silk Smitha
- Vijayalalitha as Jayanthi
- Raveendran as Inspector Jayan
- Kuthiravattom Pappu as Pappu
- Poojappura Ravi as Peter
- Ranipadmini as Hema
- Renuchandra as Renu
- Suchithra as Parukutty

== Soundtrack ==
The music was composed by G. Devarajan and the lyrics were written by Poovachal Khader.

No.	Song	Singers	Lyrics	Length (m:ss)
1	"Arimullappoovin"	K. J. Yesudas, P. Madhuri	Poovachal Khader	
2	"Padachonte Srishtiyil"	K. J. Yesudas	Poovachal Khader	
3	"Ponnin Kaadinu"	P. Madhuri	Poovachal Khader	
