= Chorakku Chora =

- Directed by: Crossbelt Mani
- Starring: Jagathy Sreekumar; Ratheesh; Balan K. Nair; Kuthiravattam Pappu; Silk Smitha
- Music by: Guna Singh
- Production company: Karthikeya Films
- Distributed by: Karthikeya Films
- Release date: 24 August 1985
- Country: India
- Language: Malayalam

Chorakku Chora is a 1985 Indian Malayalam film, directed by Crossbelt Mani. The film stars Jagathy Sreekumar, Ratheesh, Balan K. Nair and Kuthiravattam Pappu in the lead roles. The film has musical score by Guna Singh.

== Cast ==
- Jagathy Sreekumar as Kunjappan
- Ratheesh as Khader
- Balan K. Nair as Chellappan
- Kuthiravattam Pappu as Velu
- Silk Smitha as CID Silk
- Prathapachandran as Rahman
- Ravi Menon as Paulose
- Kaduvakulam Antony as Paramu
- Hari as SP Subramaniyam
- Sathaar as Markose
- Sudheer as Veerappan
- Anuradha as Chandrika
- Lalithasree as Thankamma
- Roshni as Nabeesha
- Mafia Sasi as Gunda
- Muralimohan as DSP Aloshys

== Soundtrack ==
The music was composed by Guna Singh and the lyrics were written by Poovachal Khader.

No.	Song	Singers	Lyrics	Length (m:ss)
1	"Kallakannottam"	Vani Jairam	Poovachal Khader	
2	"Manjin Kulirala"	Chorus, Krishnachandran	Poovachal Khader	
3	"Ragardra Hamsangalam"	P. Jayachandran, Lathika	Poovachal Khader	
