= Sheshakriya =

- Directed by: Ravi Alummoodu
- Written by: M. Sukumaran
- Screenplay by: M. Sukumaran
- Produced by: Suresh Venganoor
- Starring: Aranmula Hariharaputhran; Jalaja; John Samuel; P. V. Narayanan
- Cinematography: Vipin Mohan
- Edited by: Hariharaputhran
- Production company: P. Sea's Films
- Distributed by: P. Sea's Films
- Release date: 28 May 1982
- Country: India
- Language: Malayalam

Sheshakriya is a 1982 Indian Malayalam film, directed by Ravi Alummoodu and produced by Suresh Venganoor. The film stars Aranmula Hariharaputhran, Jalaja, John Samuel and P. V. Narayanan in the lead roles.

== Cast ==
- Aranmula Hariharaputhran
- Jalaja
- John Samuel
- P. V. Narayanan
