= Image Commune =

Image Commune is a film and video production team of personal and professional friends living and working mostly in Kerala, India, and trying to make meaningful communications with the world we live in through real and virtual images. The art of filmmaking beyond the entertainment industry is the elemental concern of the team, and two generations of film personals and film lovers from 1980 onwards are involved in this fraternity group. Rajiv Vijay Raghavan (Filmmaker), Venu (Cinematographer and Filmmaker), Sunny Joseph (Cinematographer), Beena Paul (Editor), P T Ramakrishnan (Filmmaker and Film society Activist), Anvar Ali (Poet & Screen Writer) are some of those who are involved in this team.

== Films ==
- Building the Bridge - a story of Gender equity produced and directed by Rajiv Vijay Raghavan for the World Water Conference held in The Hague, Netherlands in 2000 was the first film under the banner of Image Commune. This documentary narrates the struggles and goals of a group of women masons in Kerala who started getting trained in this profession out of their own sheer worries and hopes of achieving a private and protected space for their daily sanitary needs.
- Margam

Margam (film) (Malayalam: മാര്‍ഗം meaning: the path), 2003, directed by Rajiv Vijay Raghavan was the first feature film under the banner of Image Commune that won a number of national and International awards.

- Maruvili

Maruvili (Call from the Other Shore), 2015, a 90 minutes documentary directed by Anvar Ali on the life and works of Attoor Ravi Varma, the renowned Indian poet writing in Malayalam, was produced by the group in 2015.
