= Post Mortem (1982 film) =

- Poster
- Directed by: J. Sasikumar
- Written by: Pushparajan; Dr. Pavithran (dialogues)
- Screenplay by: Dr. Pavithran
- Produced by: Pushparajan
- Starring: Prem Nazir; Mammootty; Sukumaran; Balan K. Nair
- Cinematography: K. B. Dayalan
- Edited by: K. Sankunni
- Music by: K. J. Joy
- Production company: Rajapushpa
- Distributed by: Rajapushpa
- Release date: 24 September 1982
- Running time: 134 minutes
- Country: India
- Language: Malayalam

Post Mortem is a 1982 Indian Malayalam-language thriller film directed by J. Sasikumar based on a screenplay by Dr. Pavithran. The film was produced by Pushparajan under the banner of Rajapushpa Productions. The film stars Prem Nazir in the lead role along with Mammootty, Sukumaran and Balan K. Nair in other supporting roles. The film's score was composed by KJ Joy. The film was a commercial success and was remade in four languages – in Tamil in 1983 as Vellai Roja, in Telugu in 1984 as S. P. Bhayankar, in Kannada in 1988 as Dharmathma and in Hindi in 1993 as Tahqiqaat.

== Cast ==
- Prem Nazir as Fa.James /Dysp
- Mammootty as Johnny
- Sukumaran as Peter Esthappan
- Swapna as Aleese Esthappan
- T. G. Ravi as Chakkochen
- Balan K. Nair as Mammukka
- Prathapachandran as Esthappan
- Meena as Reethamma
- Jalaja as Aswathy Teacher
- Janardanan as Unni
- Kuthiravattam Pappu as const. Kurup
- Sathyakala

== Soundtrack ==
The music was composed by K. J. Joy with lyrics by Poovachal Khader.

No.	Song	Singers	Length (m:ss)
1	"Makkathe Panimathi Pole"	Unni Menon, Chorus	
2	"Raaja Pushpame Rithu Raaja Pushpame"	K. J. Yesudas	
