= Hari (actor) =

Indian Malayalam film actor and dubbing artist

Harikeshan Thampi
- Occupation: Actor
- Years active: 1960-present

Harikeshan Thampi, stage name Hari, is an Indian actor and dubbing artist best known for his work in Malayalam cinema. He has acted in more than 50 films and dubbed for almost 1,000 films.

Thampi made his debut in the Malayalam film Raja Harishchandra as Lohithakshan, son of Raja Harishchandra. Later he switched roles to be a dubbing artist. He lent his voice for Chiranjeevi in 60 films and all of them were super hits. Nagarjjuna, Krishna, and Mohan Babu were identified with his voice in Telugu. Ambareesh, Vishnuvarddan and Malayalam actors Sankar, Shanavas, Captain Raju, and Devan also benefited from the flexibility of his vocal cords.

== Filmography ==
=== As an actor ===
- 1954 Bhaalya Sakhi as child artist
- Manthravadi (1956)
- Seetha (1960)
- Unniyarcha (1961)
- Bhakta Kuchela (1961) as Sukunan
- Krishna Kuchela (1961)
- Kadathukaran (1965) as Chandran
- Archana (1966) as Rajan's collegemate
- Station Master (1966)
- Pavappettaval (1967)
- Postman (1967)
- Mainatharuvi Kolakkes (1967)
- Sahadharmini (1967)
- Midumidukki (1968)
- Susy (1969)
- Sabarimala Sree Dharmashastha (1970)
- Panchavan Kaadu (1971)
- Sambhavaami Yuge Yuge (1972) as Policer Inspector
- Bhaarya Illaatha Raathri (1975)
- Swami Ayyappan (1975)
- Chottaanikkara Amma (1976)
- Udyaanalakshmi (1976)
- Manimuzhakkam (1978) as Jose Paul
- Amba Ambika Ambaalika (1976)
- Sreemurukan (1977)
- Veerabhadran (1979)
- Puthiya Velicham (1979)
- Ambalavilakku (1980)
- Digvijayam (1980)
- Muthuchippikal (1980) as Raghu
- Vaadaka Veettile Athidhi (1981)
- Munnettam (1981) as Doctor
- Ammakkorumma (1981) as Varghese
- Chaappa (1982)
- Paanjajanyam (1982) as Raghu
- Gaanam (1982)
- Belt Mathai (1983) as Advocate
- Ee Yugam (1983)
- Kadamattathachan (1984) as Kunchavan Potti
- Krishna Guruvaayoorappa (1984) as Namboorishan
- Chorakku Chora (1985) as SP Subramaniyam
- Uyarthezhunelpu (1985)
- Madhuvidhu Theerum Munpe (1985)
- Naaradan Keralathil (1987)
- Ellaavarkkum Nanmakal (1987)
- Inquilabinte Puthri (1988) as Velayudan
- Chaaravalayam (1988)
- Ancharakkulla Vandi (1989) as Raghavan
- Eenam Thettatha Kattaru (1989) as Kattumooppan
- Beauty Palace (1990)
- Thudarkadha (1991) as Police Inspector
- Aswathy (1991) as Usman
- Swaroopam(1992)
- Gandharvam (1993) as Advocate
- Prasala Pachan Payyannoor Paramu (1994) as Bank Manager
- Hijack (1995) as I.G
- Kinavu Pole (2001)
- Malaramban (2001)
- Rasaleela
- Thalsamayam Oru Penkutty (2012)
- Vaidooryam (2013)

=== As a dubbing artist ===
Movie	actor	character
Orikkal Oridathu	Shanavas	Lazer
Superstar	Kavalam Sasikumar	Nanappan
Vardhakya Puranam	Bharath Gopi	Rama Pothuval
Kudumbakodathi	N.L Balakrishnan	Jambulingam Ashan
Kottappurathe Koottukudumbam	Baburaj	Anthony
Gajaraja Manthram	Baburaj	Gopykrishnan
Olangal	Amol Palekar	ravi
Kadhanayakan	Kalamandalam Kesavan	Payyarathu pathmanbhan nair
Superman	Spadikam George	C.I Jagathnathan
Aayiram Naavulla Ananthan	Spadikam George	Dy.SP Jecob
Aavanazhi	Captain Raju	Sathyaraj
Theekattu	Captain Raju	Basheer
Nadodikkattu	Captain Raju	Pavanayi
Amrutham Gamaya	Captain Raju	Suku/Sukumaran
Oru Sindoora Pottinte Ormaykku	Captain Raju	C.K.Guptha
Adimakal Udamakal	Captain Raju	Sathyan
Koodikazhca	Babu Antony	Williams
Kottayam Kunjachan	Babu Antony	Jimmy Pappan
Jagratha	Babu Antony	Babu
Nirakkoottu	Babu Namboothiri	Ajith
Crime File	Babu Namboothiri	Chief Minister
Oru Minnaminunginte Nurunguvettam	Devan	Hari
Naalkavala	Devan	Dr.Devadas
Aranyakam	Devan	
Vida Parayaanmathram	Devan	Jayashanker
Bhadrachitta	Devan	Haridas
Dhinarathrangal	Devan	Dr.Unnikrishnan
Kilukkam	Devan	
Ghoshayaathra	Devan	Jamal Fakrudeen
Hijack	Devan	Swamiji/Raveedra Varma
Grihaprevesam	Devan	Madhavankutty
Aalavattam	Devan	Dr.Narayanankutti
Simon Peter Ninakku Vendi	Devan	Simon Peter
New Delhi	Devan	Shanker
Vaartha	Devan	Philip
Champion Thomas	Sunny Agustine	Thomas /Tommy
Kanyakumariyil Oru Kavitha	Sarath Babu	Varmaji/Guruji
Sabarimalayil Thanka Sooryodayam	Sarath Babu	Rajaram Swami
Samrajyam	Sathar	
Maanthrikam	Kollam Ajith	Freddy
Avalariyathe	Kollam Ajith	S.I Babu
Congratulations Miss Anitha Menon	Kollam Thulasi	Keshavan Nair
Ishtamanu Nooru Vattam	Kollam Ajith	
Carnivel	V K Sreeraman	Syric Kureekkadan
Layanam	V K Sreeraman	capt.Chandrashekhar
Kattukuthira	V K Sreeraman	Kochuraaman
Vaishali	V K Sreeraman	Vibhanthakan
Arabia	V K Sreeraman	Dharmapuri king
Nattu Vishesham	V K Sreeraman	Rajan
Nattu Vishesham	Vijayaraghavan	Vijayan
Vazhiyorakazchakal	Charuhasan	Swamiji
Gandhari	Charuhasan	Prof.Ramamoorthy
Randam Varavu	Charuhasan	Shivanadaji
Idanilangal	kundara Johny	Kuttappan
Onnum Onnum Pathinonnu	Ratheesh	
Veendum Lisa	Nizhalgal Ravi	Kalyan
Amina Tailors	Rajan P Dev	Hydrose
Veendum Chalikkunna Chakram	Shankar	Vinayan
Innalenkil Nale	Raveendran	Ravi
Velicham Vitharunna Penkutty	Raveendran	Jayashanker
Prayikkara Pappan	Surendra Pal	Thekkan
Thenkasipattanam	Spadikam George	Devarajan
