= Unarthupattu =

- Directed by: P. A. Backer
- Written by: P.A. Backer, M. Sukumaran
- Starring: Seshan, Chandramohan, Kannaki, U.Jayachandran, Kanakalatha
- Release date: 1980
- Country: India
- Language: Malayalam

Unarthupattu (English: The Awakening Song) is a 1980 Malayalam film directed by P. A. Backer.

== Additional information ==
The film never had a theatrical release. Reportedly, not a single print of this black & white film is available today.

It was Kanakalatha's debut film. Over a career spanning more than four decades until 2023, she acted in more than 150 movies.

Piravi (1989) directed by Shaji N. Karun is based on a similar concept.
