= Dr. Pavithran =

Indian lyricist and script writer

Dr. Pavithran is an Indian film scriptwriter and lyricist who predominantly works in Malayalam cinema. He has been the scriptwriter for more than 50 films. He has also written around 50 songs for 12 Malayalam films.

== Partial filmography ==
=== Dialogue ===
- Vyaamoham
- Mannu
- Sikharangal
- Vadakaveedu
- Oru Raagam Pala Thaalam
- Oothikachiya Ponnu
- Sreemaan Sreemathi
- Chappa
- Oru Thira Pinneyum Thira
- Priyasakhi Raadha
- Dhrohi
- Post Mortem
- Ente Katha
- Chakravaalam Chuvannappol
- Mortuary
- Aayiram Abhilaashangal
- Karimbu
- Ardha Raathri

=== Screenplay ===
- Vyaamoham (1978)
- Mannu (1978)
- Sikharangal (1979)
- Vadakaveedu (1979)
- Oru Raagam Pala Thaalam (1979)
- Oothikkaachiya Ponnu (1981)
- Oru Thira Pinneyum Thira (1982)
- Priyasakhi Raadha (1982)
- Postmortem (1982)
- Ente Kadha (1983)
- SChakravaalam Chuvannappol (1983)
- Mortuary (1983)
- Aayiram Abhilaashangal (1984)
- Karimbu (1984)
- Sree Narayanaguru (1986)
- Ardha Raathri (1986)

=== Story ===
- Oru Raagam Pala Thaalam (1979)
- Mortuary (1983)
- Sree Narayanaguru (1986)

=== Lyrics ===
- Poovaadithorum ... Thalirukal 1967
- Akashaveedhiyil ... Thalirukal 1967
- Pularippon ... Thalirukal 1967
- Pakaroo Gaanarasam ... Thalirukal 1967
- Pandu Pandoru Kaattil ... Thalirukal 1967
- Kuthichu Paayum ... Thalirukal 1967
- Paadano Njan Paadano ... Vilakkappetta Bandhangal 1969
- Paadume Njan Paadume ... Vilakkappetta Bandhangal 1969
- Swarnamukilukal Swapnam ... Vilakkappetta Bandhangal 1969
- Penninte Kannil ... Vilakkappetta Bandhangal 1969
- Kaiviral Thumbonnu ... Vilakkappetta Bandhangal 1969
- Varavaayee Vellimeen Thoni ... Jalakanyaka 1971
- Ezhu Kadalodi ... Jalakanyaka 1971
- Aaro Aaro Aaraamabhoomiyil ... Jalakanyaka 1971
- Aadyaraavil Aathiraraavil ... Jalakanyaka 1971
- Onne Onne Po Po ... Jalakanyaka 1971
- Naadha Varoo Prananaadha ... Preethi 1972
- Kannuneeril ... Preethi 1972
- Kizhakku Ponmalayil ... Preethi 1972
- Adharam Madhuchashakam ... Preethi 1972
- Umma Tharumo ... Preethi 1972
- Kanna Kaarvarnna [Thoovenna Kandal] ... Preethi 1972
- Paalaazhithira ... Sooryakanthi 1977
- Maanathaare ... Sooryakanthi 1977
- Poovaadikalil [D] ... Vyaamoham 1978
- Neeyo Njaano ... Vyaamoham 1978
- Oro Poovum Viriyum Pulari Pon ... Vyaamoham 1978
- Poovaadikalil [F] ... Vyaamoham 1978
- Akalangalile ... Mannu 1978
- Devi Bhagavathi ... Mannu 1978
- Evideyo Thakaraaru ... Mannu 1978
- Kunnin Meloru ... Mannu 1978
- Ninakku Njaan Swantham ... Sikharangal 1979
- Ammayilla achanilla ... Sikharangal 1979
- Swapnangalkkarthangal undaayirunnenkil ... Ormakale Vida Tharoo 1980
- Jeevitha Nritham ... Ormakale Vida Tharoo 1980
- Kaarmukil ... Ormakale Vida Tharoo 1980
- Doore Neelavaanam ... Ormakale Vida Tharoo 1980
- Enikkaay nee janichu ... Aasha 1982
- Aashe aare chaare ... Aasha 1982
- Marubhoomiyile ... Aasha 1982
- Aashe aare chaare (sad) ... Aasha 1982
- Mathimukhi Nin ... Shila 1982
- Neelaambarathile Neeraalasayyayil ... Shila 1982
- Prema raagam ... Shila 1982
- Prapancha veena ... Ente Kadha 1983
