= Thaliritta Kinakkal =

- Directed by: P. Gopikumar
- Screenplay by: Jamal Kochangadi
- Story by: P. Chandrakumar
- Starring: Prathap Pothen; Sukumaran; Tanuja; Kuthiravattam Pappu; Madhu Malini
- Cinematography: S.J.Thomas
- Edited by: G. Murali
- Music by: Jithin Shyam
- Production company: Chithra Geethi
- Distributed by: Chithra Geethi
- Release date: 27 June 1980
- Country: India
- Language: Malayalam

Thaliritta Kinakkal is a 1980 Indian Malayalam film, directed by P. Gopikumar. The film stars Prathap Pothen, Sukumaran, Kuthiravattam Pappu and Madhumalini in the lead roles. The film has musical score by Jithin Shyam.

== Cast ==
- Prathap Pothen
- Sukumaran
- Kuthiravattam Pappu
- Madhu Malini
- Tanuja
- Kovai Sarala
- Adoor Bhavani

== Soundtrack ==
The music was composed by Jithin Shyam and the lyrics were written by Jamal Kochangadi, Aayish Kamal and P. Bhaskaran.

The film is famous for being the only Malayalam film to have featured the legendary Mohammed Rafi in its soundtrack. Being huge fans of his, the makers were keen on getting Indian cinema's favourite voice to record for them. However, Rafi commented that he needed a few weeks to learn the pronunciation of the language and without understanding the language he would not be able to impart the right emotions. Hence, a Hindi song was decided to be included in the film, to which he agreed, and thus "Shabab Leke" came about.

No.	Song	Singers	Lyrics	Length (m:ss)
1	"Aa Churam Ee Churam"	K. J. Yesudas, Vani Jairam, Chorus	Jamal Kochangadi	
2	"En Mooka Vishadham"	S. Janaki	Jamal Kochangadi	
3	"Saaz-E-Dil Tod Do"	K. J. Yesudas	Aayish Kamal	
4	"Shaarike Varoo Nee"	K. J. Yesudas	P. Bhaskaran	
5	"Shabaab Leke"	Mohammed Rafi	Aayish Kamal	
6	"Vaiki Vanna Vasanthame"	K. J. Yesudas	P. Bhaskaran	
