= Aalavattam =

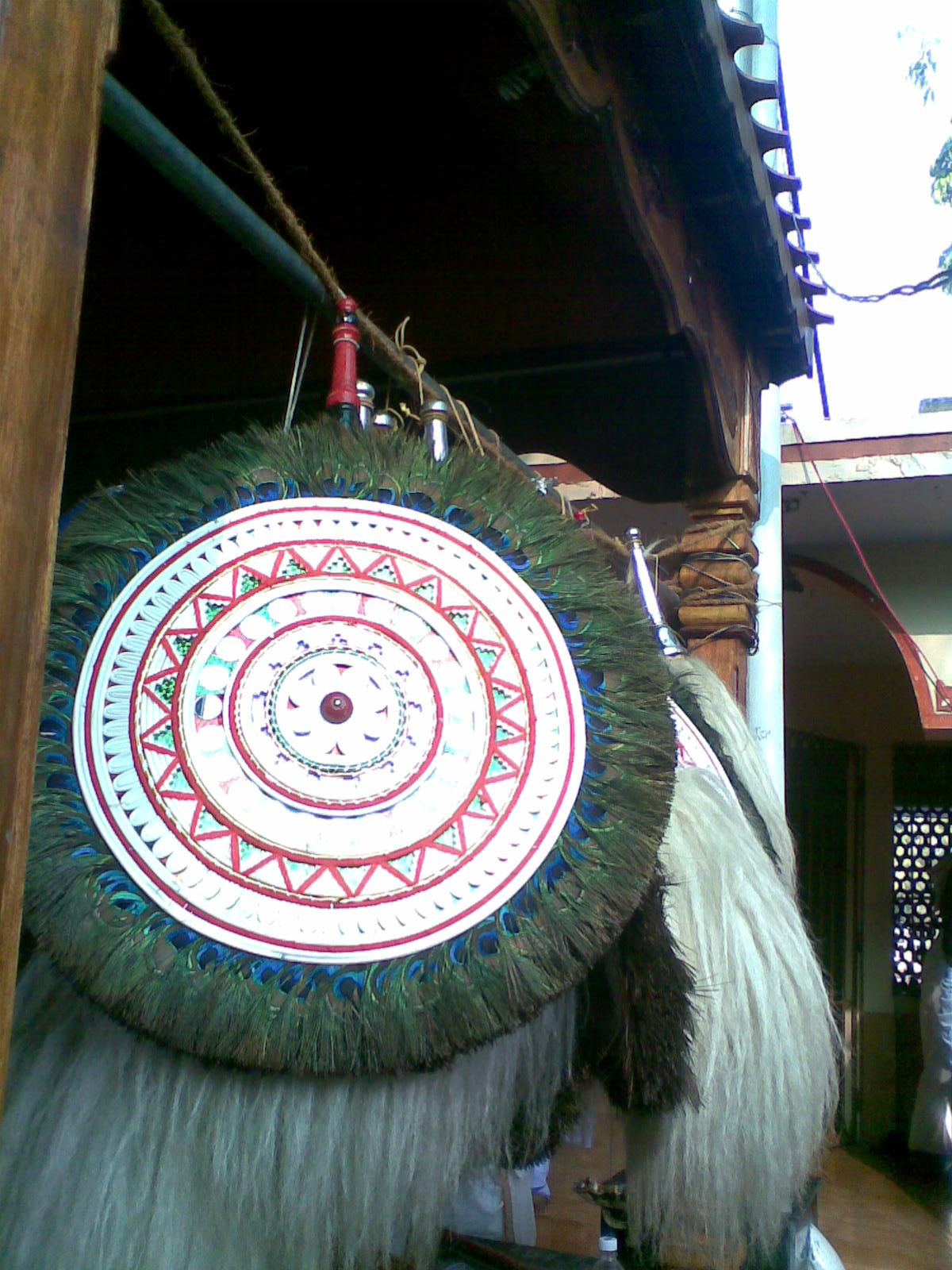
Aalavattam

Aalavattam (Malayalam: ആലവട്ടം, from Sanskrit: आलावर्ता) is a special decorative circular shield or fan that is held beneath both sides of respectable idols, deities or mythological characters during festivals and dances, especially in the state of Kerala in South India. The object is peculiar to the state of Kerala in India and the name originates from Malayalam (ml).

The shield is made of finely shaped and cut peacock feathers aligned in a circular fashion around a wooden or fiber plaque with traditionally dictated decorative patterns made of other natural objects such as sea shells etc.

Aalavattam is an essential element to be held atop the elephants during the poorams of South India where caparisoned elephants are marched in an organized and controlled procession as part of the annual local temple festival. Each elephant will have two or three persons atop, one of whom is dedicated to hold a pair of alavattam. During special phases of the accompanying percussion orchestra (Panchavadyam, Pandi Melam or Panchari Melam), the person shall raise up on the back of elephant and hold the alavattams high up above his shoulders.

A typical use of aalavattam in staged art performance can be seen during special appearance scenes of certain protagonist characters in Kathakali dance.
