= Rafique Khan =

Indian musician and composer (born 1968)

Ustad Rafique Khan
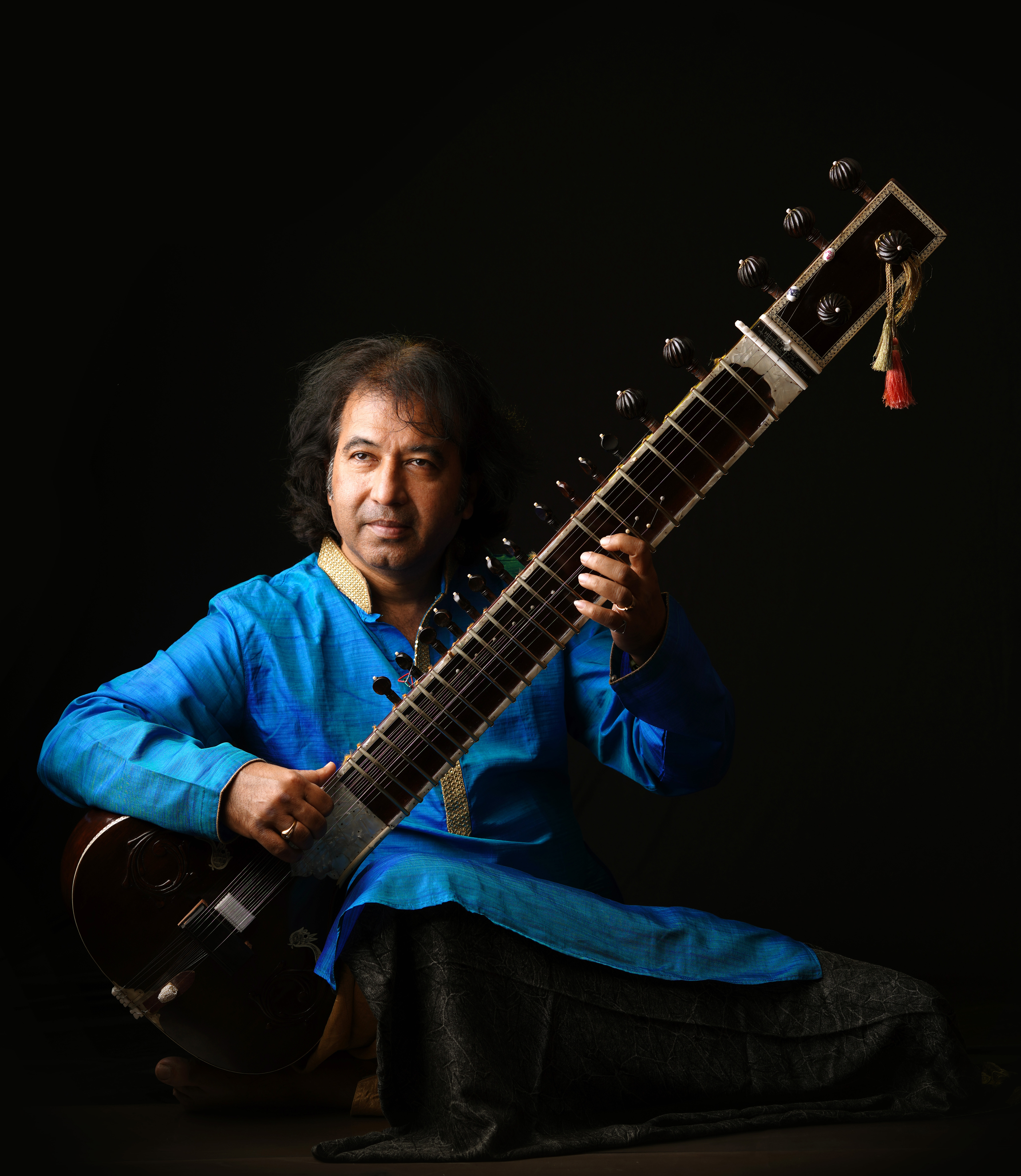

Background information
- Born: June 30, 1968; Dharwad, India
- Genre: Hindustani Classical
- Occupations: Musician, Composer, Producer
- Website: www.ustadrafiquekhan.com

Ustad Rafique Khan (born 30 June 1968) is an Indian musician and composer who plays the sitar. He belongs to the sixth generation of musicians from the Dharwad Gharana. His father, the late Ustad Abdul Karim Khan was a distinguished sitarist at his time, and his grandfather who was awarded the 'Sitar Ratna', Rahimat Khan was accredited for adding the base octave to the sitar and for modifying the three-string sitar to the seven-string instrument that is common today. Khan is the younger brother of Ustad Bale Khan and Chhote Rahimat Khan and has a twin brother, Shafique Khan, also a sitarist.

== Early life and education ==
Rafique Khan was born in Dharwad and started playing the sitar at the age of nine. He was tutored by his father and his elder brothers Ustad Usman Khan and Ustad Bale Khan. He was also trained in Gayaki Ang by his uncle Ustad Dastagir Khan. He passed his music exams from Gandharva Mahavidyalaya, Mumbai and graduate with a degree in philosophy at the University of Goa.

== Achievements & Awards ==
Rafique Khan won the "Sur Mani Award" from Sur Singar Samsad, Mumbai, at the age of 23 years. He is also an empaneled artiste of the Indian Council for Cultural Relations. Rafique Khan has toured across the nation and the world, performing at various music festivals. He has been rated as a 'top-grade' artiste by All India Radio and has had four of his recitals aired on their national programmes. He has performed at music festivals and collaborated with musicians all over the world including Europe, Middle East and South East Asia. In 2019 he received the Sandesha Karnataka State Award constituted by the Konkani Academy, Pt. Jasraj award by mevati- swati Trivandrum and Sangeeta saurabha award.

== Musical style ==
One of the unique characteristics of his playing is that he preserves the purity of the Raga and maintains the balance of the two mixed styles in Gayaki Ang (vocal style) and Tantakari Ang (instrumental style). He has mastered the Gamak Taans, which is considered to be one of the most difficult techniques on the sitar. His command over the finger board is exemplary. The music that he produces is pure melody. Audiences are enthralled by the movements of his nimble fingers on each note he plays.

== Current position ==
Rafique Khan currently works at All India Radio, Mangalore. He is the President of the music organization Sangeet Bharati Foundation and also has an Academy of Hindustani Music at Mangalore.
