= Layanam =

- Promotional poster designed by RK
- Directed by: Thulasidas
- Written by: Bhaskaran
- Produced by: R. B. Choudary
- Starring: Silk Smitha; V. K. Sreeraman; Nandhu; Abhishek; Devishri/Jahnvi
- Cinematography: Melly Dayalan
- Edited by: G. Murali
- Music by: Jerry Amaldev
- Distributed by: Super Good Films
- Release date: 22 December 1989
- Running time: 110 minutes
- Country: India
- Language: Malayalam

Layanam (transl. Dissolution) is a 1989 Indian Malayalam-language erotic drama film directed by Thulasidas and produced by R. B. Choudary. The film stars prominent sexploitation actresses Silk Smitha, Abhilasha, and Devishri/Jahnvi, as well as young Nandu. It was one of the biggest hits in the Malayalam soft-porn industry, and has earned a cult status. The film features the story of a young boy who becomes intimately related to three older women.

== Plot ==
Layanam is the story of the sexual relationship between a woman and a younger man. In the film, the character portrayed by Silk Smitha lives alone in a large house. She is constantly harassed by men in the locality. One day, Nandu's character, a boy on the run for no fault of his own hides in the back of Smitha's car, but is caught, but let off. They meet again, and upon learning that he is an orphan, Smitha employs him as a servant.

Nandu starts fantasizing about his employer, while rejecting sexual offers from others. Smitha's cousin Abilasha comes to stay in the house, and develops a crush for the boy, which Smitha disapproves. Smitha and Nandu slowly start to like each other and decide to get married. At the point, Smitha's long thought dead husband returns complicating the situation. In the end, the lovers commit suicide.

== Cast ==
- Silk Smitha
- Nandhu
- Abhilasha
- V.K Sreeraman
- Jagathy Sreekumar
- Chandrajee
- Bobby Kottarakkara
- Devika
- Bindu Ghosh
- Unni Mary
- Venugopal

== Production ==
=== Development ===
Thulasidas' first film Onninu Purake Mattonnu (1988) was an average grosser at the box office. After watching Summer of '42 (1971) in Casino theatre, Madras (now Chennai), a part of the film struck him and he developed it into a script. It was given a working title, Layanam. He then started searching for producer who could bankroll the project. He first contacted Sundarlal Nahatha of Melody Creations, who had previously produced his debut directorial, Onninu Purake Mattonnu. However, he was not interested in producing a film. He then met Rasheed of the Hassan-Rasheed production duo, who was his neighbor and narrated the script to him, He liked the script and took him to a financier, R. B. Choudary of Super International Films for money to finance the film. Upon reaching Choudary's office he was asked to narrate the film. After listening to the script, Choudary decided to bankroll the project. Rasheed was given an amount and the matter was settled. It was a co-production between GoodKnight Mohan and B. R. Choudary and was produced under the banner of Super Good Films.

=== Casting ===
While discussing about the casting, Thulasidas suggested Sumalatha as the female lead. While writing the script, Thulasidas had considered Sumalatha or Lakshmi for the lead role. A production manager was sent to talk with Sumalatha and Lakshmi. However, both of them couldn't accept the role due to their prior commitments. It was Choudary who successfully suggested Silk Smitha for the role. For the male lead, Thulasidas had decided to cast a new face. Harish Kumar from the Telugu film industry was initially considered, however, he later had a change of mind. Thulasidas was a family friend and neighbor of drama actors Chavara V. P. Nair and Vijayalakshmi and used to frequently visit them. During one of his visits he spotted their son, Prince and asked them if he could cast him in the film, to which they responded positively and he was cast as the male lead and was rechristened Nandu by Thulasidas.

== Reception ==
Tehelka wrote in 2011, "Layanam, a fetished cult hit, is a perfectly good soft porn movie that rather prematurely disintegrates into a real movie. Its scriptwriting intentions are noble, though. Silk Smitha's remarkably self-possessed performance shows us both her outer sexual confidence and her inner anxiety over being lonely."

== Legacy ==
Two of the actors – Silk Smitha and Nandu – of the film later committed suicide, enhancing the film's status. Onmanorama wrote in April 2016 that "some reports suggest that he went into depression after acting in a soft-porn movie (Layanam) and became a drug addict". Silk Smitha, known for her bold roles and alcoholism, also committed suicide, declaring a failed love affair to be the reason.

12 years after its release it was remade in Hindi as Reshma Ki Jawani.
