= P. A. Backer =

Indian director (1940–1993)

- Born: 1940; Thrissur, Kingdom of Cochin
- Died: 22 November 1993 (aged 53); Thiruvananthapuram, India
- Occupations: Film director; film producer
- Spouse: Anita Backer
- Parent(s): Ahmad Musaliar; Fathima
- Awards: National Film Award for Best Feature Film in Malayalam; Chappa; National Film Award for Best Feature Film in Malayalam; Manimuzhakkam; Nargis Dutt Award for Best Feature Film on National Integration; Sree Narayana Guru

P. A. Backer (1940 – 22 November 1993) was one of the new-wave Malayalam film directors of the 1970s and 1980s.

== Life sketch ==
Backer was born in 1940 to Ahamed Musliar and Fathima of Kanippayyoor near Kunnamkulam in Thrissur, Kingdom of Cochin (now part of Kerala state, India). While still a student, Backer worked as a journalist for Kuttikal and Poomottukal. He then worked as an assistant and production manager to director Ramu Kariat (1960), including on Chemmeen (1965). He made his debut as a producer in 1970 with Olavum Theeravum which won the state awards for the best film and best cinematography.

He turned director in 1975 with Kabani Nadi Chuvannappol (When the River Kabani Turned Red). A film about a leftist political activist, which won him the State award for best director, was released during the Indian Emergency. Some other notable movies by Backer are Manimuzhakkam (Peal of Bells), Chuvanna Vithukal (Red Seeds/Seeds of revolution), Sree Narayana Guru and Sanghaganam (Chorus). Manimuzhakkam, based on the novel Murippadukal by Sarah Thomas, won the National Film Award for Best Regional Film and the Kerala State Film Award for Best Film. Sree Narayana Guru won the Nargis Dutt Award for Best Feature Film on National Integration. His last film as a director was Innaleyude Baaki (The Balance of Yesterday; 1988).

He died on 22 November 1993, aged 53, at his residence in Thiruvananthapuram. He was survived by his wife Anita Backer.

== Filmography ==
Backer directed the following films:

- Sakhavu (incomplete film)
- Innalayude Baaki (1988)
- Sree Narayana Guru (1985)
- Premalekhanam (1985) - based on the novel Premalekhanam by Vaikom Muhammad Basheer
- Charam (1983)
- Chappa (1982)
- Unarthupattu (1980)
- Manninte Maril (1979)
- Sanghaganam (1979)
- Chuvanna Vithukal (1978)
- Mani Muzhakkam (1976) - based on the novel Murippadukal by Sarah Thomas
- Kabani Nadi Chuvannappol (1976)

== Awards ==
=== Kerala State Film Awards ===
- 1970 - Kerala State Film Award for Best Film for Olavum Theeravum
- 1976 - Kerala State Film Award for Best Film for Manimuzhakkam
- 1975 - Kerala State Film Award for Second Best Film for Kabani Nadi Chuvannappol
- 1977 - Kerala State Film Award for Second Best Film for Chuvanna Vithukal
- 1975 - Kerala State Film Award for Best Director for Kabani Nadi Chuvannappol
- 1976 - Kerala State Film Award for Best Screenplay for Manimuzhakkam

=== National Film Awards ===
- 1976 - National Film Award for Best Feature Film in Malayalam for Manimuzhakkam
- 1982 - National Film Award for Best Feature Film in Malayalam for Chappa
- 1985 - Best Film on National Integration for Sree Narayana Guru
