= Silk Smitha =

Indian movie actress (1960 - 1996)

- Born: Vadlapati Vijayalakshmi; 2 December 1960; Eluru, Andhra Pradesh, India
- Died: 23 September 1996 (aged 35); Chennai, Tamil Nadu, India
- Cause of death: Suicide by hanging
- Occupation: Actress
- Years active: 1979–1996
- Works: Full list

Vadlapati Vijayalakshmi (2 December 1960 – 23 September 1996), better known by her stage name Silk Smitha, was an Indian actress and dancer who worked in Tamil, Telugu, Kannada, Malayalam and Hindi films. She became one of India's most popular sex symbols of the 1980s and early 1990s, as well as one of the most sought-after erotic actresses in South Indian cinema in the 1980s. Smitha was a key figure in the Malayalam softcore film genre in the late 1980s.

In a career spanning 18 years, she appeared in over 450 films. Smitha was part of several successful dance numbers in the 1980s Indian films. She entered the industry as a supporting actress, and was first noticed for her role as "Silk" in the 1979 Tamil film, Vandichakkaram.

== Early life ==
Smitha was born in Kovvali village in Eluru district, Andhra Pradesh on 2 December 1960 to Vadlapati Ramallu and Sarasamma.

Due to family poverty, she had to drop out of school during the fourth standard. Her family pushed her into marriage with an older man at the age of 14, despite being underage, due to their financial situation.

Her husband and in-laws abused her, and within two years she walked out of this marriage and ran away, working as a housemaid to support herself. She then moved to Chennai to live with her sympathetic mother, working as a make-up or "touch-up" artist.

== Career ==
Smitha started as a touch-up artist for the actress Aparna and soon got a break in small character roles. She was given her first movie role as a heroine by Malayalam director Antony Eastman in his film Inaye Thedi, though the movie was released very much later. Eastman gave her the name Smitha.

She got her big break in Tamil cinema after director Vinu Chakravarthy took her under his wing; his wife taught her English and arranged for her to learn dancing, though soon, due to her marked sex appeal, she switched to roles of cabaret dancers and vamps and inevitably found herself typecast.

After garnering much notice and acclaim with her first major role in the Tamil film Vandichakkaram (1980), Smitha assumed the screen name "Silk", after her character's name in the movie. After it became a big hit, she could not escape typecasting, severely limiting her range throughout her career.

Smitha went on to star in Tamil, Malayalam, Telugu, Kannada and a few Hindi films. Her dance numbers and bold performances in films such as Moondru Mugam made her the ultimate symbol of sensuality in South Indian cinema. Her item numbers in films such as Amaran and Halli Meshtru (in Kannada) were also celebrated at the box office. Some film critics, historians and journalists have referred to her as a "soft porn" actress. A vast majority of her movies are considered "softcore" by Indian standards and a common theme is her playing a strong agent beating up huge thugs.

Her acting prowess did not go completely unnoticed, and in her rare non-sexual roles she impressed critics and audiences in Alaigal Oivathillai (1981). One of her Malayalam softcore films, Layanam (1989), has earned cult status in the Indian adult film industry and was dubbed in numerous languages, including Hindi as Reshma Ki Jawani (2002), acquiring cult status. Her most respected film is Moondram Pirai, by Balu Mahendra, remade in Hindi as Sadma, with much of the top-drawer cast, including Sridevi, Kamal Hassan, and Silk Smitha reprising their roles.

Such was her audience-drawing power that, at the peak of her career, according to Tamil film historian Randor Guy, "Films that had lain in cans for years were sold by the simple addition of a Silk Smitha song."

== Personal life ==
She was skilled in costume design, makeup and made it her profession before joining the industry as an actress.

== Death ==
On the night of 22 September 1996, after a Kannada film shoot, Smitha contacted her friend, the actress Anuradha, to come over to discuss a serious issue that was disturbing her. Later that morning, Smitha was found dead by hanging in her home at Chennai. She was 35 years old.

A few months after her death, it was reported that Smitha may have died by suicide due to excess alcohol found in her body. The police also recovered a suicide note from her, which could not be deciphered. Her death remains a mystery till today.

== In popular culture ==
- In 2011, the film The Dirty Picture directed by Milan Luthria starred Vidya Balan as Silk Smitha. Reports suggest that the family of Silk Smitha, on whom the film is based, is not happy with the movie. Smitha's brother, V. Naga Vara Prasad, claimed the film was made without the family's consent. After the claim arose, Ekta Kapoor, the producer of the film who had come up with the idea for it, stated that The Dirty Picture is not based on Silk Smitha's life.
- In 2013, a Kannada film titled Dirty Picture: Silk Sakkath Hot, starring Pakistani actress Veena Malik was released. The film was based on Silk Smitha, and Veena Malik was praised for her performance in the film. The film was a hit in Karnataka.
- A Malayalam film titled Climax, starring Sana Khan as Silk Smitha, was released on 24 May 2013.
- The 2023 Telugu film Dasara has a shop name "Silk Soda Center" also inspired by her.
- The 2023 Tamil film Mark Antony portrays her, with Vishnu Priya Gandhi, a lookalike of hers, playing the role.
