= Rajasekharan Parameswaran =

Indian artist (born 1964)

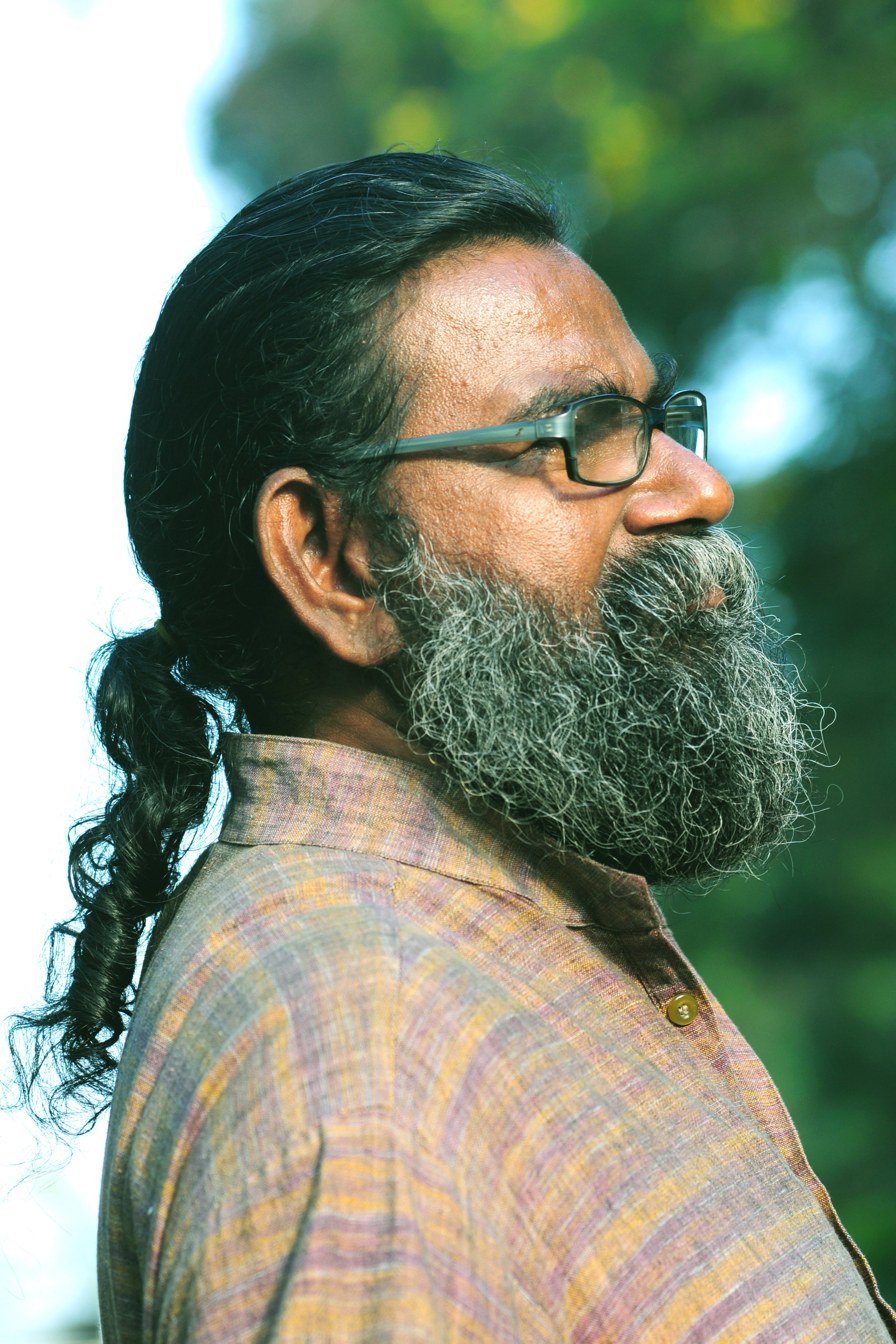
- Parameswaran in 2013
- Born: 1964 (age 61–62); Kanyakumari District, Tamil Nadu, India
- Occupations: Painter, art director
- Awards: Two Guinness World Records
- Website: rajasekharan.in

Rajasekharan Parameswaran (born 1964), also known as Marthandam Rajasekharan, is an Indian art director and self-taught painter from Tamil Nadu. He holds two Guinness World Records.

== Personal life ==
Born in 1964, Parameswaran lives in Kaliyakkavilai, Tamil Nadu, India. He is married with two daughters.

== Career ==
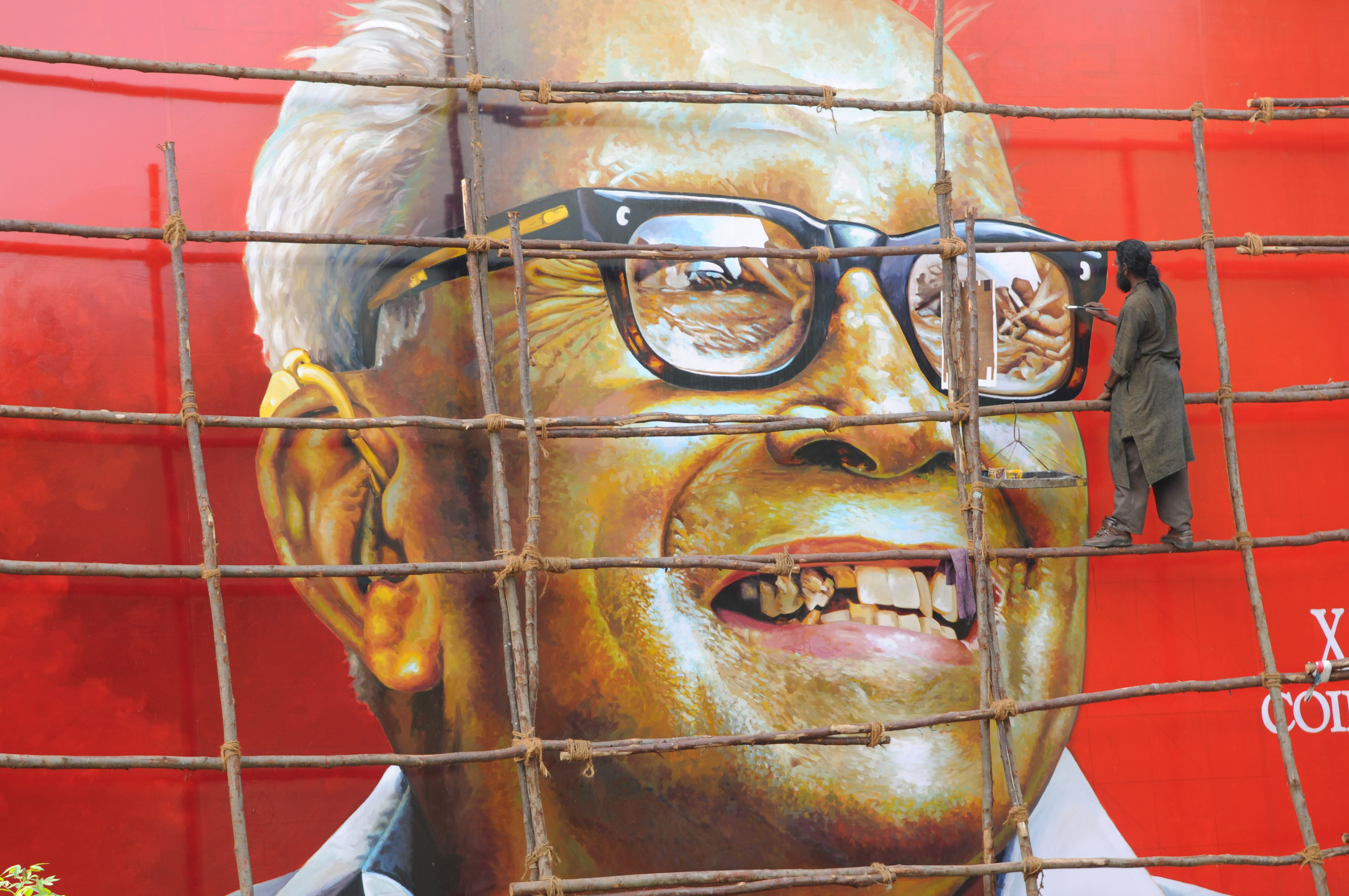
Parameswaran's painting of former Chief Minister of Kerala, E. M. S. Namboodiripad, recognized by the Guinness World Records as the largest easel painting.

Parameswaran's career has spanned various fields and included working as a statistics compiler, receptionist, medical representative, and teacher, before he transitioned into the arts. He is a self-taught artist, having learned pencil sketching and oil painting without formal training. He began his film career as an assistant director for Adoor Gopalakrishnan's 2002 film, Nizhalkuthu. His first credit as art director was for the 2007 film Naalu Pennungal, also directed by Gopalakrishnan. He has since worked as an art director for several films, including Oru Pennum Randaanum (2008), Magizhchi (2010), and Pinneyum (2016).

In 2008, Parameswaran received a Guinness World Record for creating the largest easel painting, a portrait of former Chief Minister of Kerala E. M. S. Namboodiripad, which measures 25' x 50' and is displayed on a 56.5' x 31' easel on National Highway 47, near Neyyattinkara, in Kerala. In 2010, the painting was also included in the Limca Book of Records.

He received a second Guinness World Record in 2017 for "The Largest Devil's Knot (Edaakoodam)", a type of Burr puzzle, unveiled on 27 December 2017 at the Ravis Hotels and Resorts, Kollam, Kerala. Each piece of the puzzle measures 24' x 2' x 2'.

Parameswaran won the Bikhuram National Award in 2010 for his painting of Mahatma Gandhi. That same year, his painting of Fidel Castro won an online art contest organized by ArtSlant International.

His work was exhibited at Elegance Club in Kuala Lumpur, Malaysia, in 2015. The exhibition included a portrait of Adhiletchumy Natrajan, titled Bliss, which was previously featured at the Vienna International Exhibition (2013). His painting Bhayanakam was exhibited and sold at the Lalit Kala Akademi in Chennai, with the proceeds donated to a relief fund for victims of Cyclone Thane (2011).

Parameswaran's portraits include depictions of Mother Teresa, Abdul Kalam, Richard Branson, and Najib Razak.

== Filmography ==
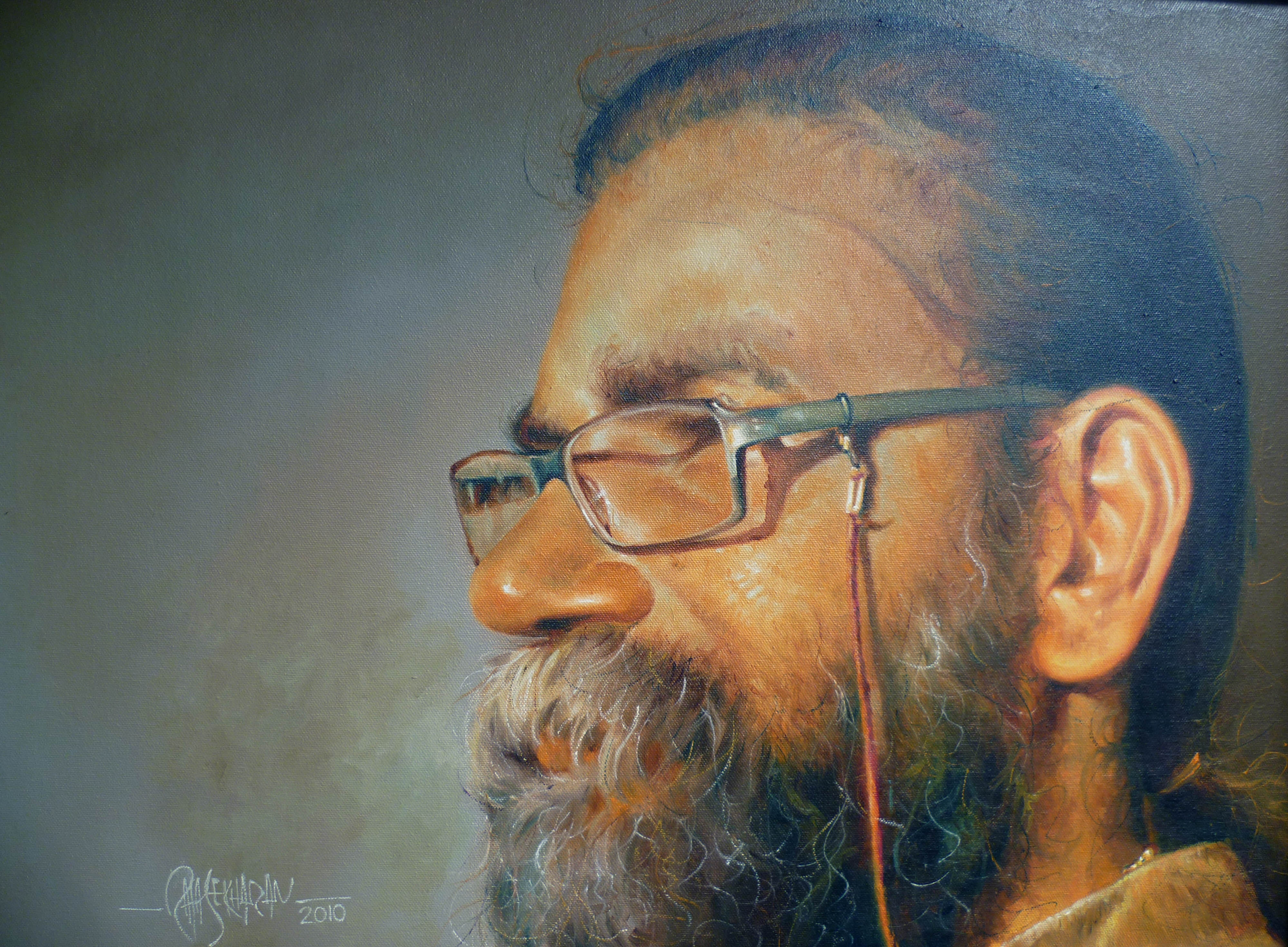
A self-portrait by Parameswaran

Year	Film	Notes
2002	Nizhalkuthu	assistant director
2005	Maestro's Memoirs	documentary based on the life of Ramankutty Nair
2006	Mohiniyattam	documentary based on Mohiniyattam
2007	Naalu Pennungal	debut as art director
2008	Oru Pennum Randaanum	art director
2010	Magizhchi	art director
2013	Kanyaka Talkies	art director
2016	Pinneyum	art director
2016	Ayaal Sassi	art director
2018	Sukhantyam	art director
2021	Vazhakku	art director

== Selected exhibitions ==
- 2009 – Alshine Art Forum, group show, New Delhi
- 2010 – International Contemporary art Festival, Daegu, Republic of Korea
- Lalit Kala Akademi, Chennai, organised by Ananda Vikatan
- 2015 – ART NOW The Artists Fair London
- 2015 – Memoirs Journey – at Elegance Club, Malaysia
- 2016 – Oxford International Art Fair – representing Laksagi Art Gallery, Malaysia
- 2016 – Symposium of Oil Painting Exhibition – 2016, Batu Gajah, Malaysia.
- 2017 – Oil Painting Demo of Abdul Kalam at Indian Institute of Space Science and Technology (IIST) Trivandrum, India.
- 2018 – Oil painting Demo of Elamkulam Namboodiripad at "EMS-ntey Lokam" – national Seminar at Wandoor, Malappuram, Kerala.
- 2019 – Oil painting Demo of Lokanath Behera drawing-life-to-a-painting – Band stand, Museum, Thiruvananthapuram, Kerala.
- 2019 – Chithra Sancharam-2019, the national level painting exhibition at Kerala Lalithakala Akademi Art Gallery, Vyloppilli Samskrithi Bhavan, Thiruvananthapuram.
- 2019 – Chithra Sancharam-II, the national level painting exhibition-2019 at Kerala Lalithakala Akademi Art Gallery, Kozhicode.
- 2019 – Solo Show-2019, 14 Oct to 30 Dec, Palaces of the Golden Horses , Jalan Kuda Emas, Mines Wellness City, 43300 Seri Kembangan, Malaysia
- 2021 – OVIYAM Kerala Arts and Crafts Village, Kovalam, Trivandrum. 20 January
- 2024 – Gefuhle-Solo oil painting exhibition, Dallas, Texas. 14 April

== Gallery ==
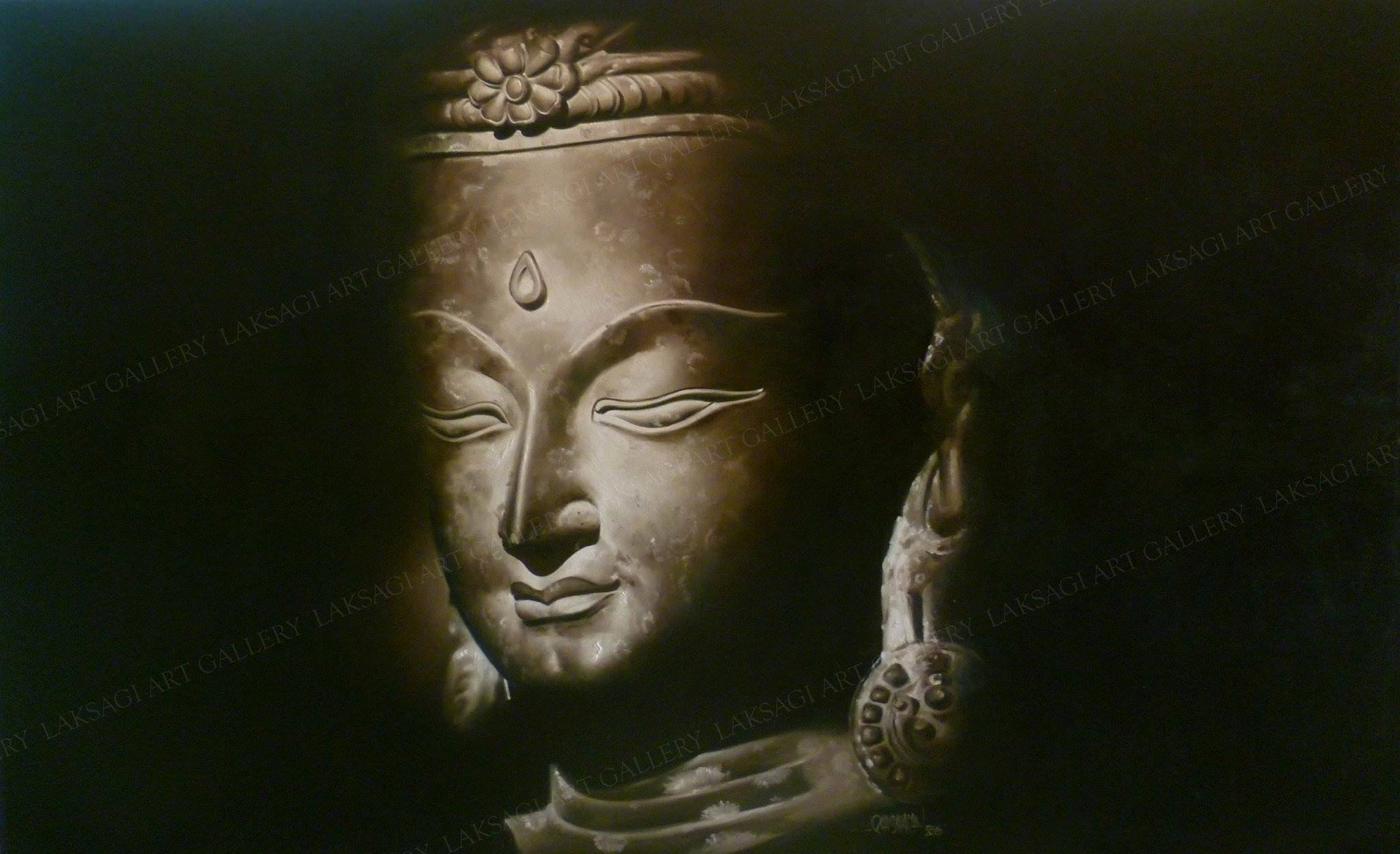
Buddha

Dr. B. R. Ambedkar, father of Indian constitution

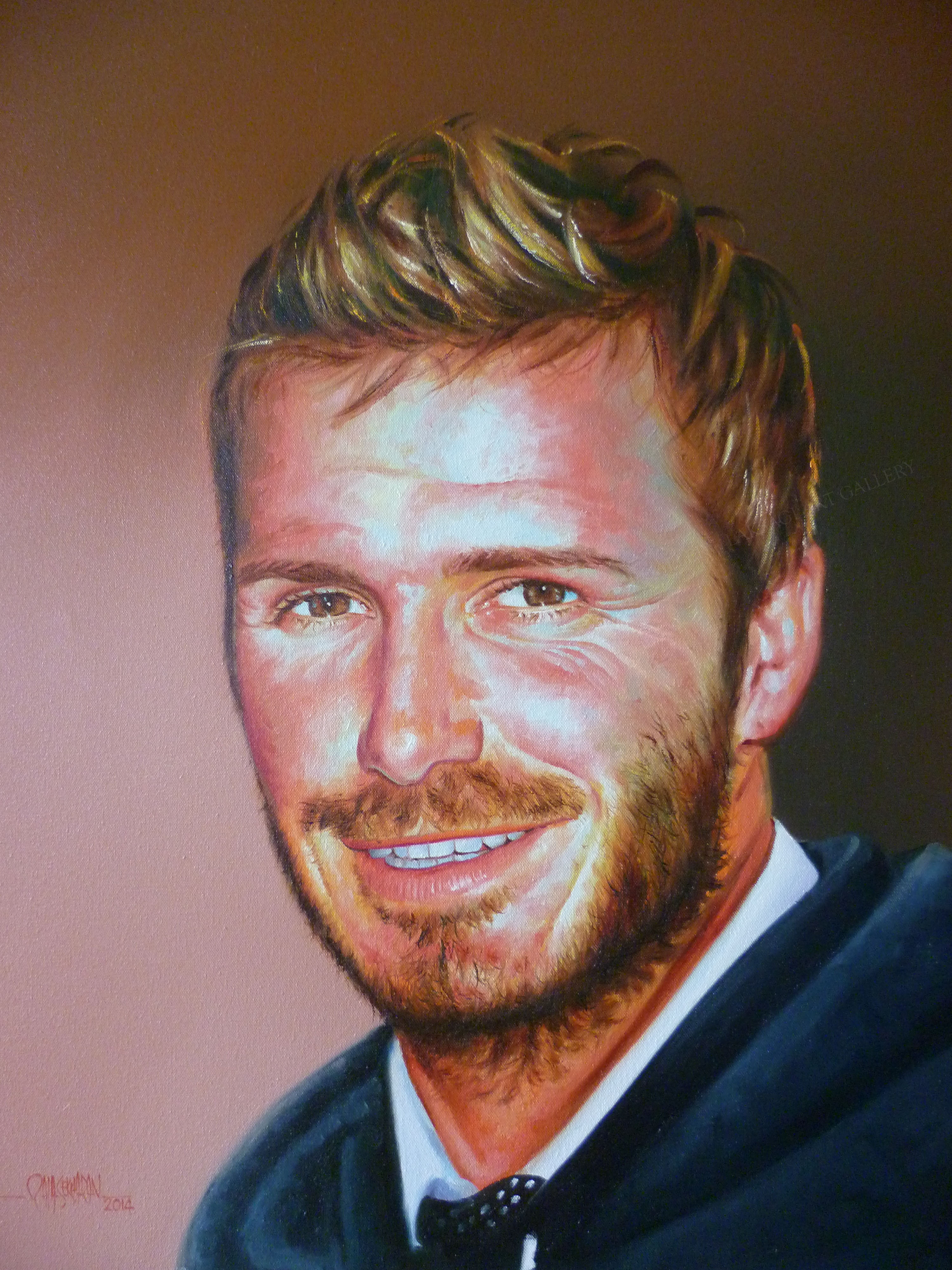
David Beckham, former football player

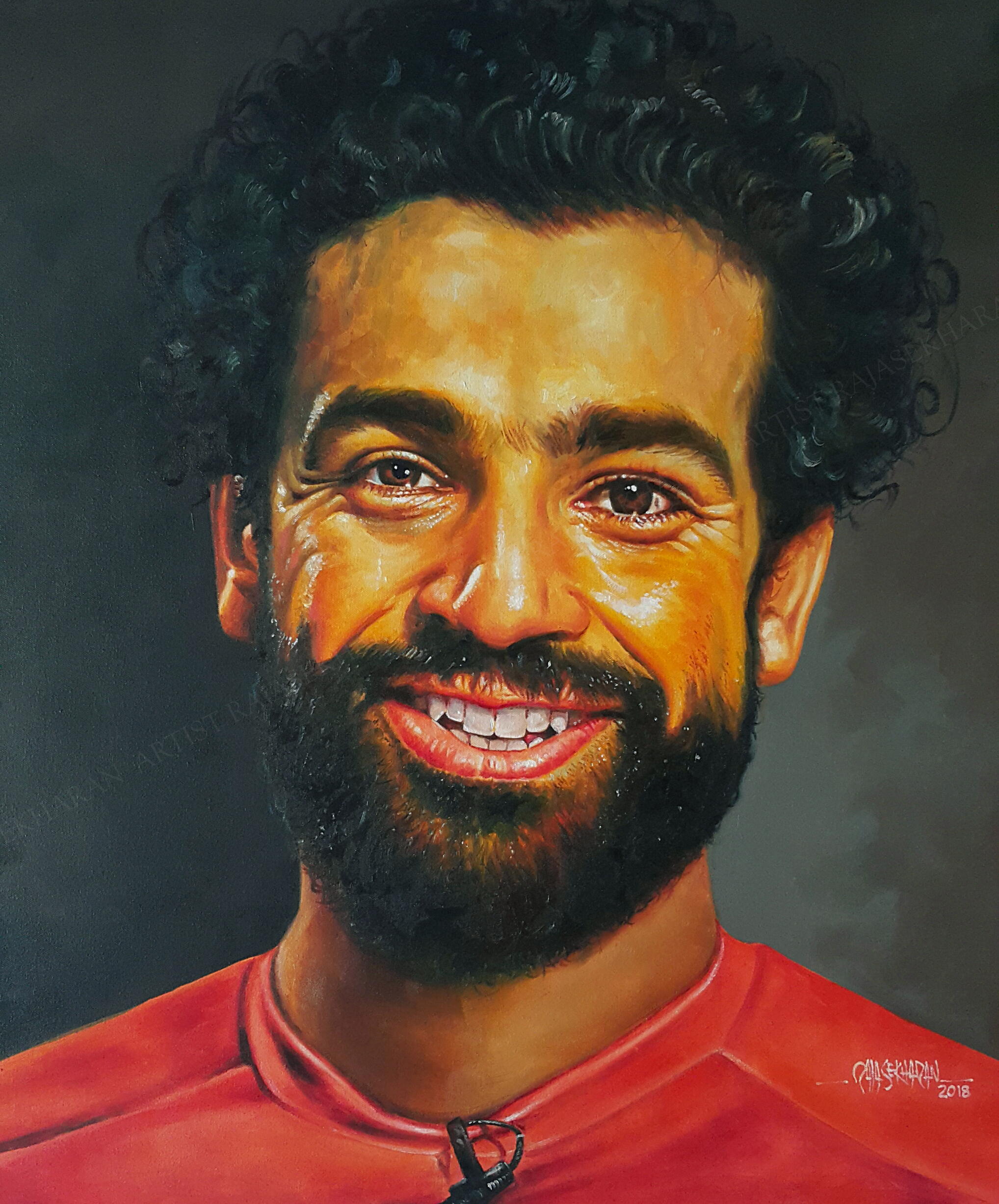
Mohamed Salah, football player

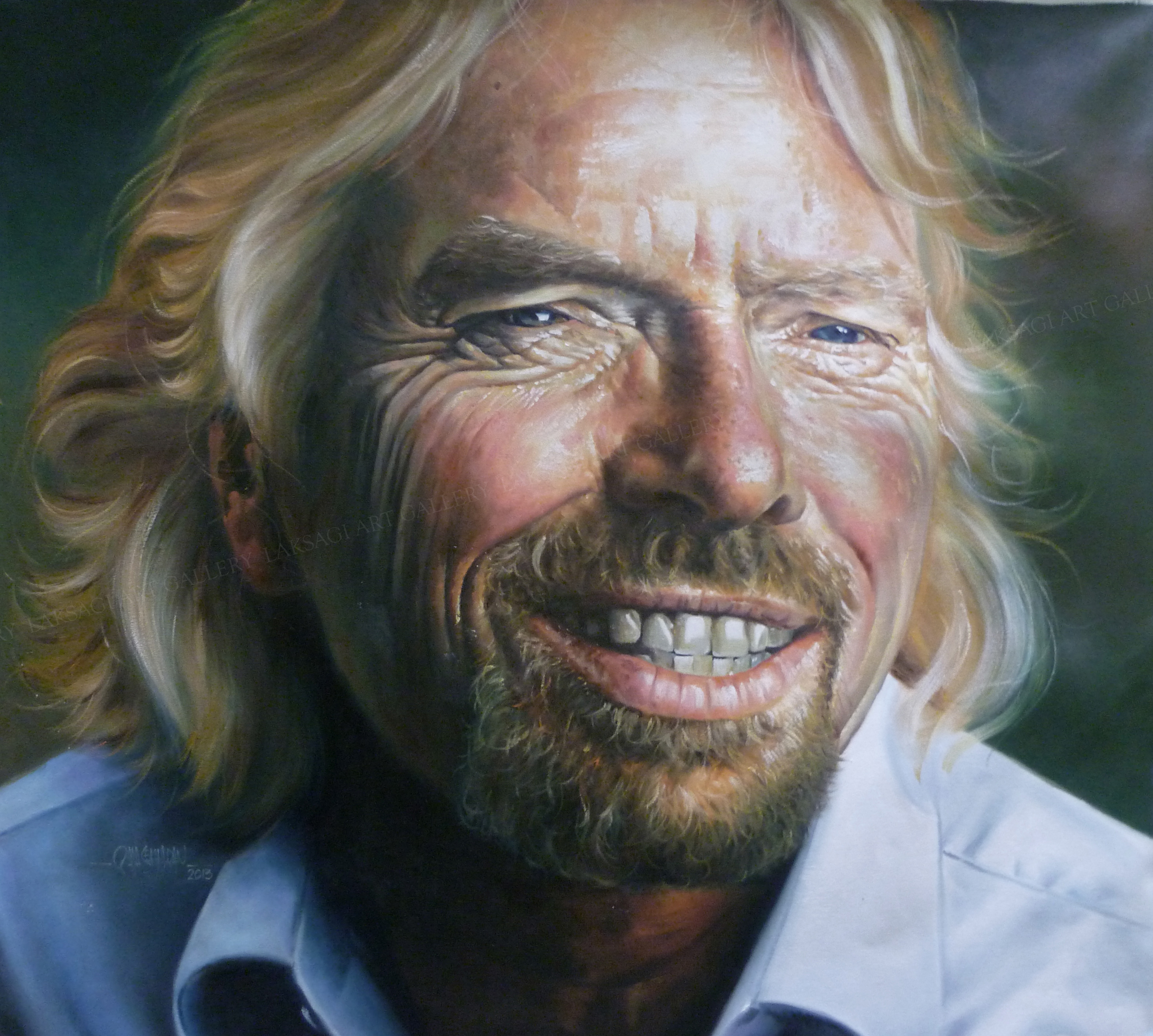
Richard Branson, English businessman

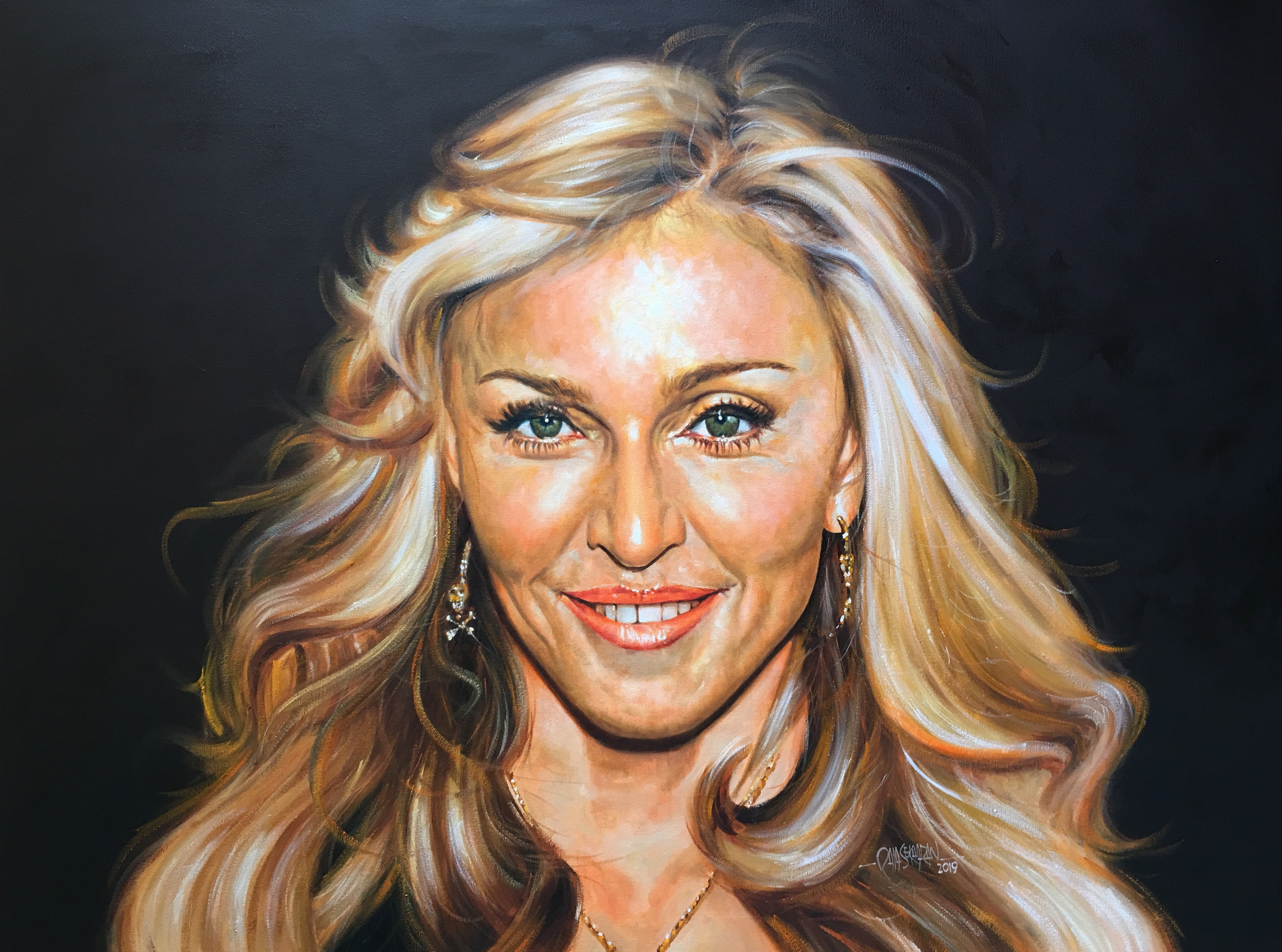
Madonna

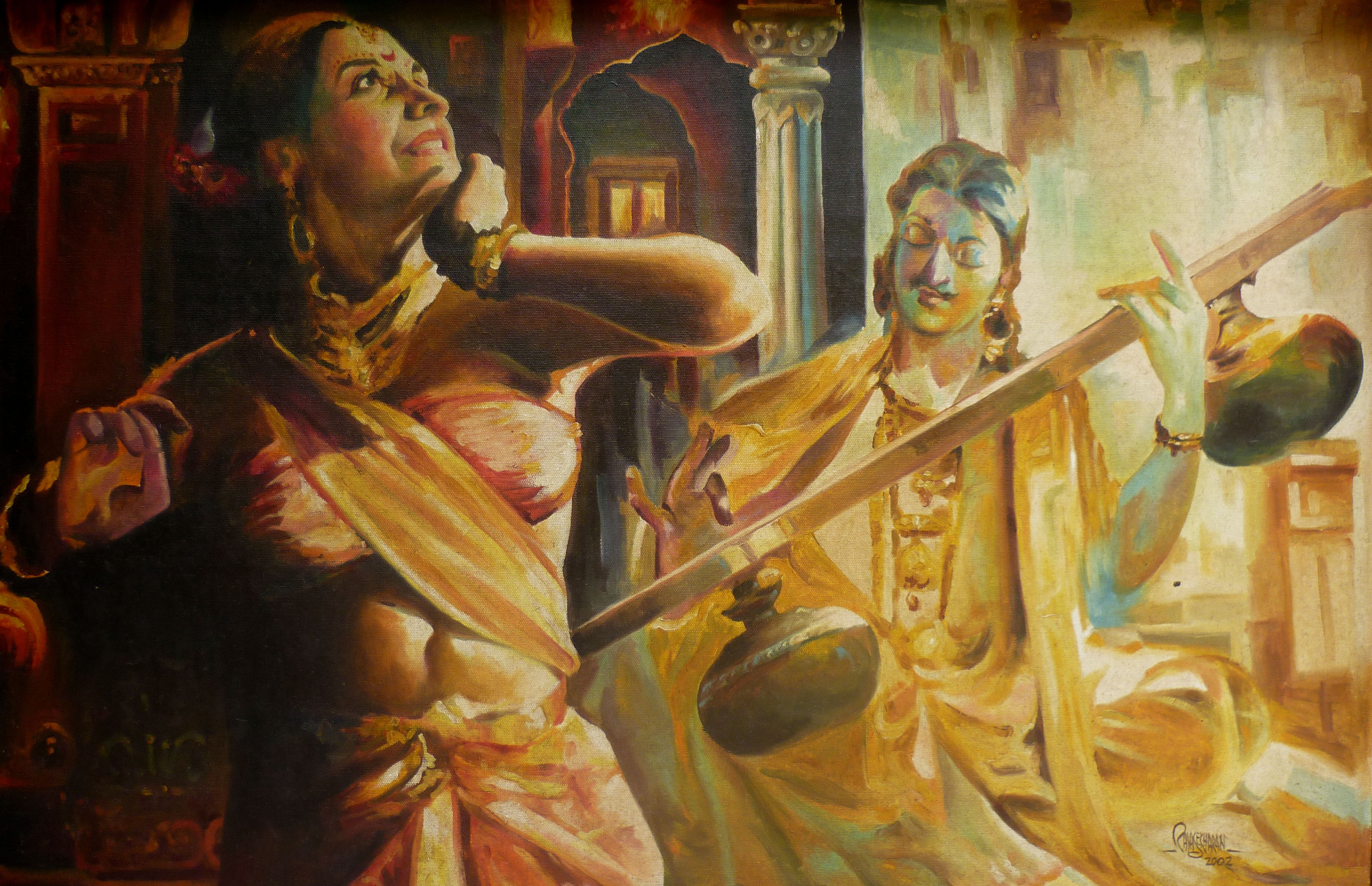
Vasavadatta, classical Sanskrit romantic tale

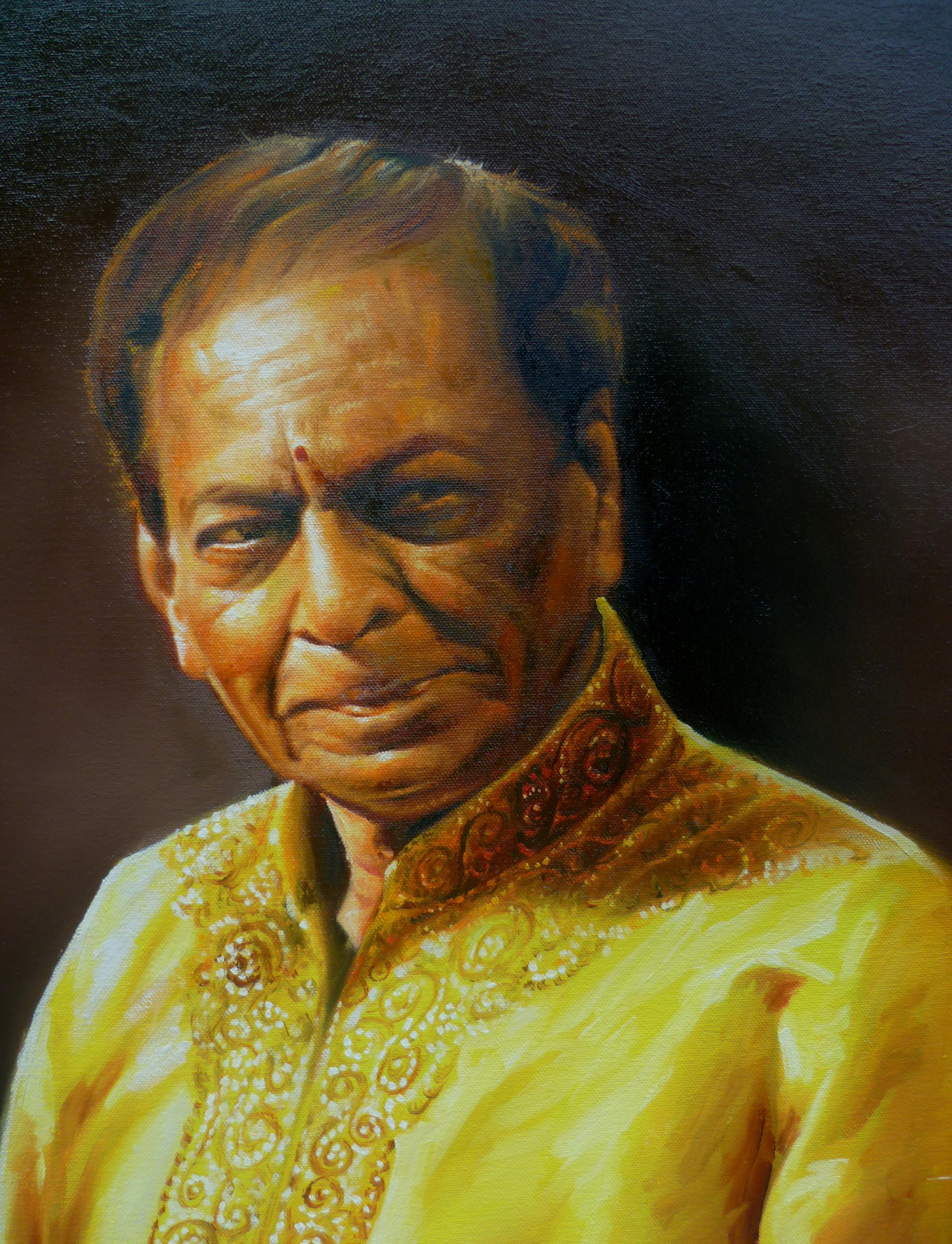
M. Balamuralikrishna, Indian artist

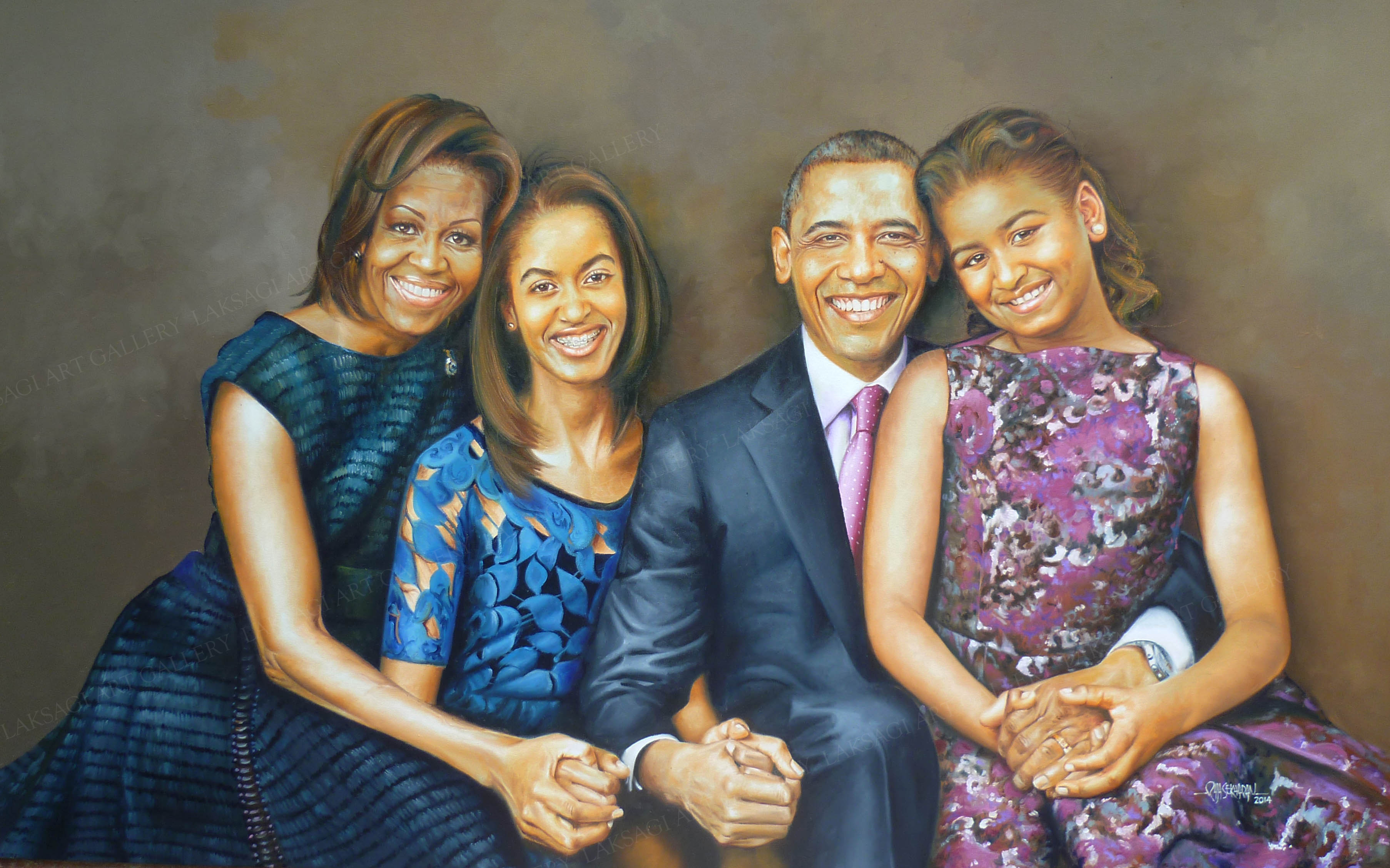
Family of Barack Obama

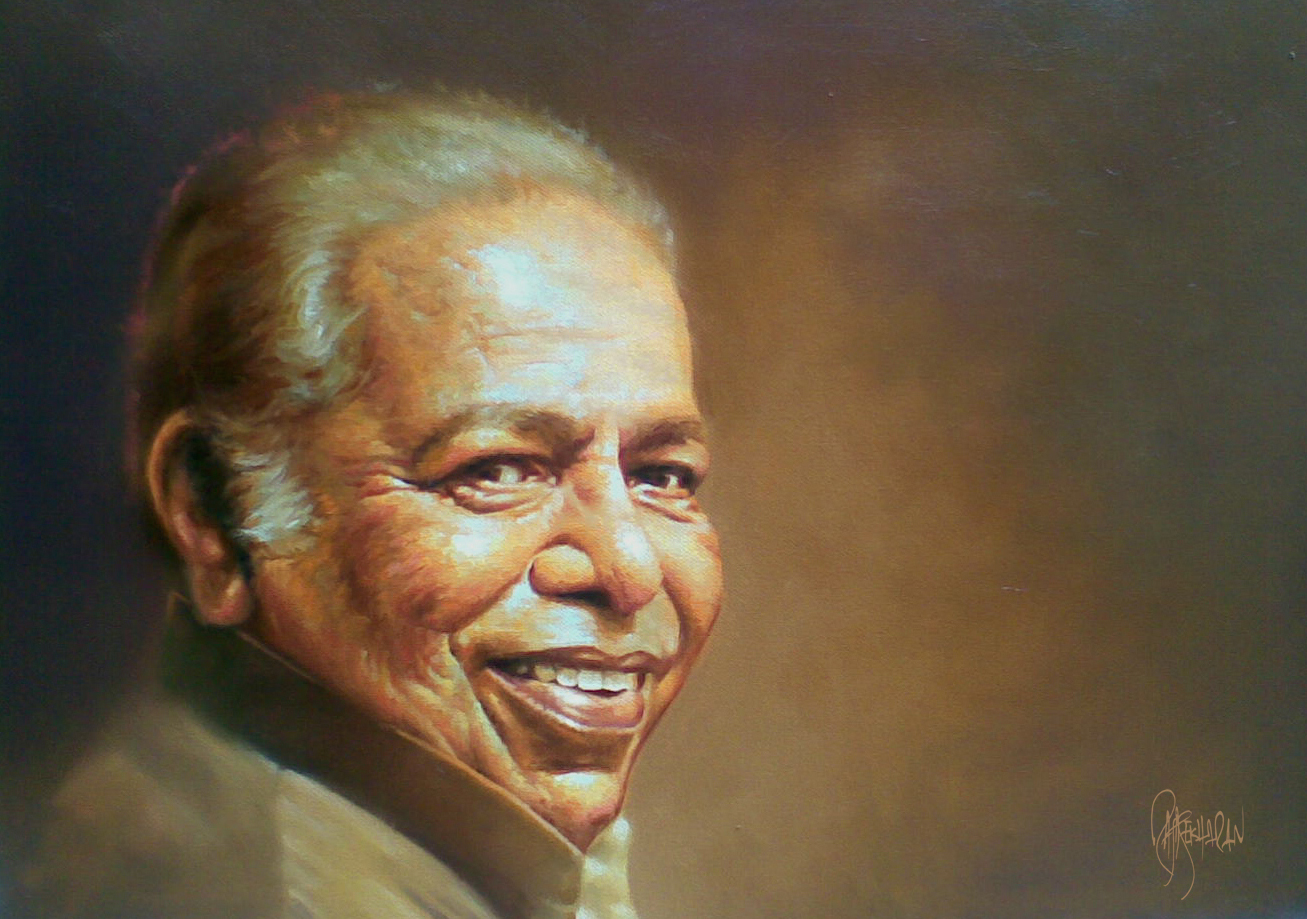
Thilakan, Indian film and stage actor

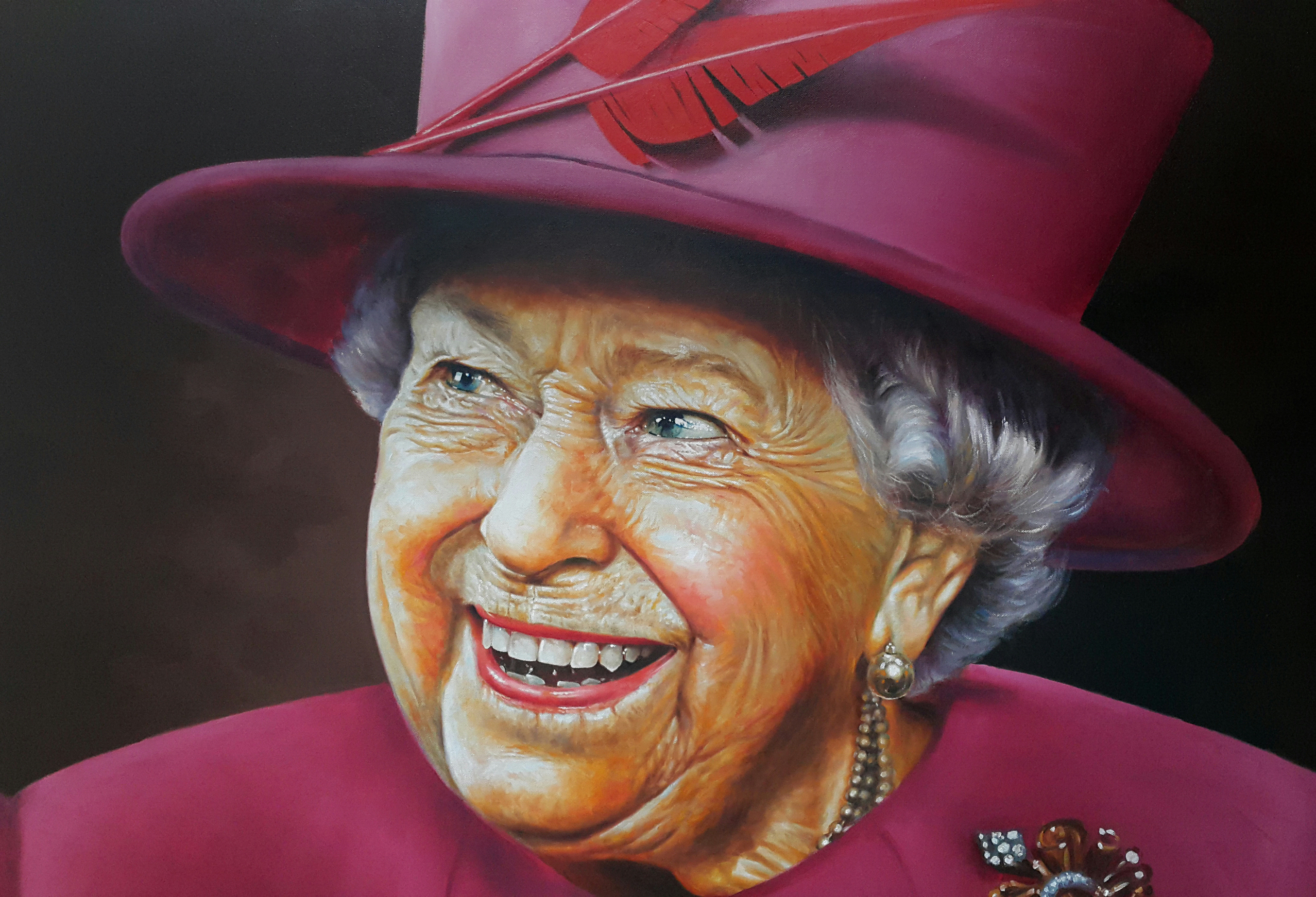
Elizabeth II

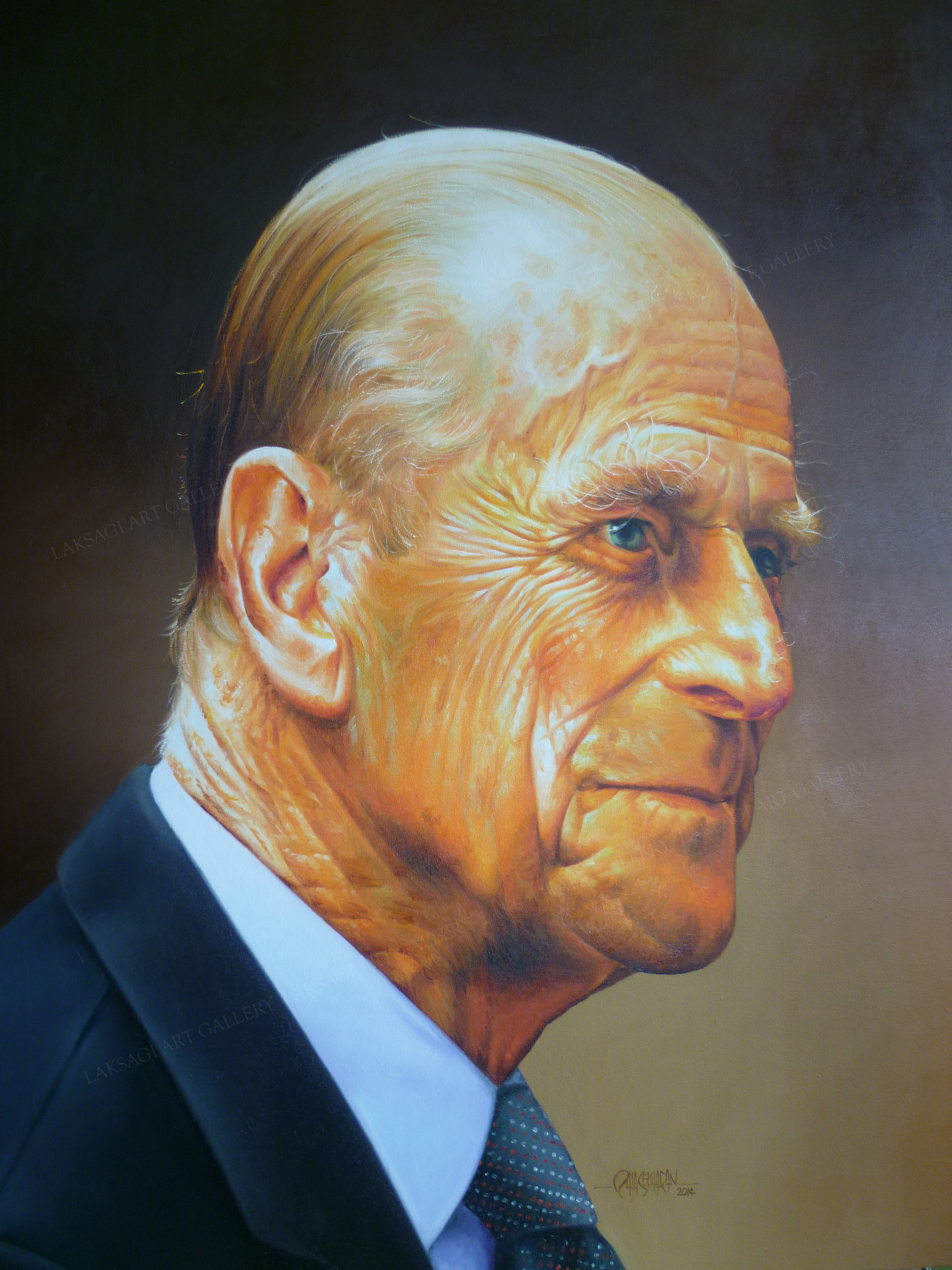
Prince Philip, Duke of Edinburgh

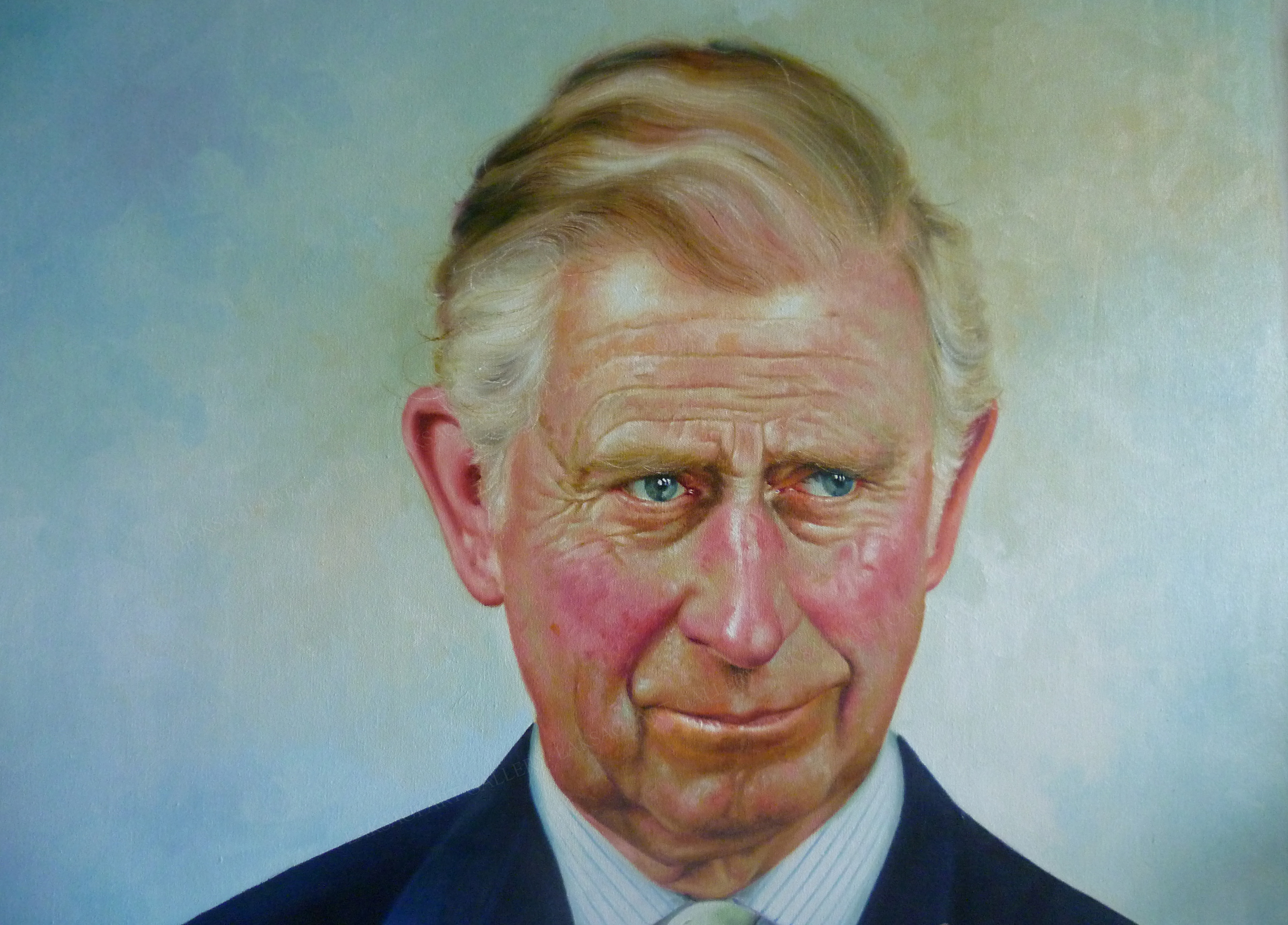
Charles, Prince of Wales

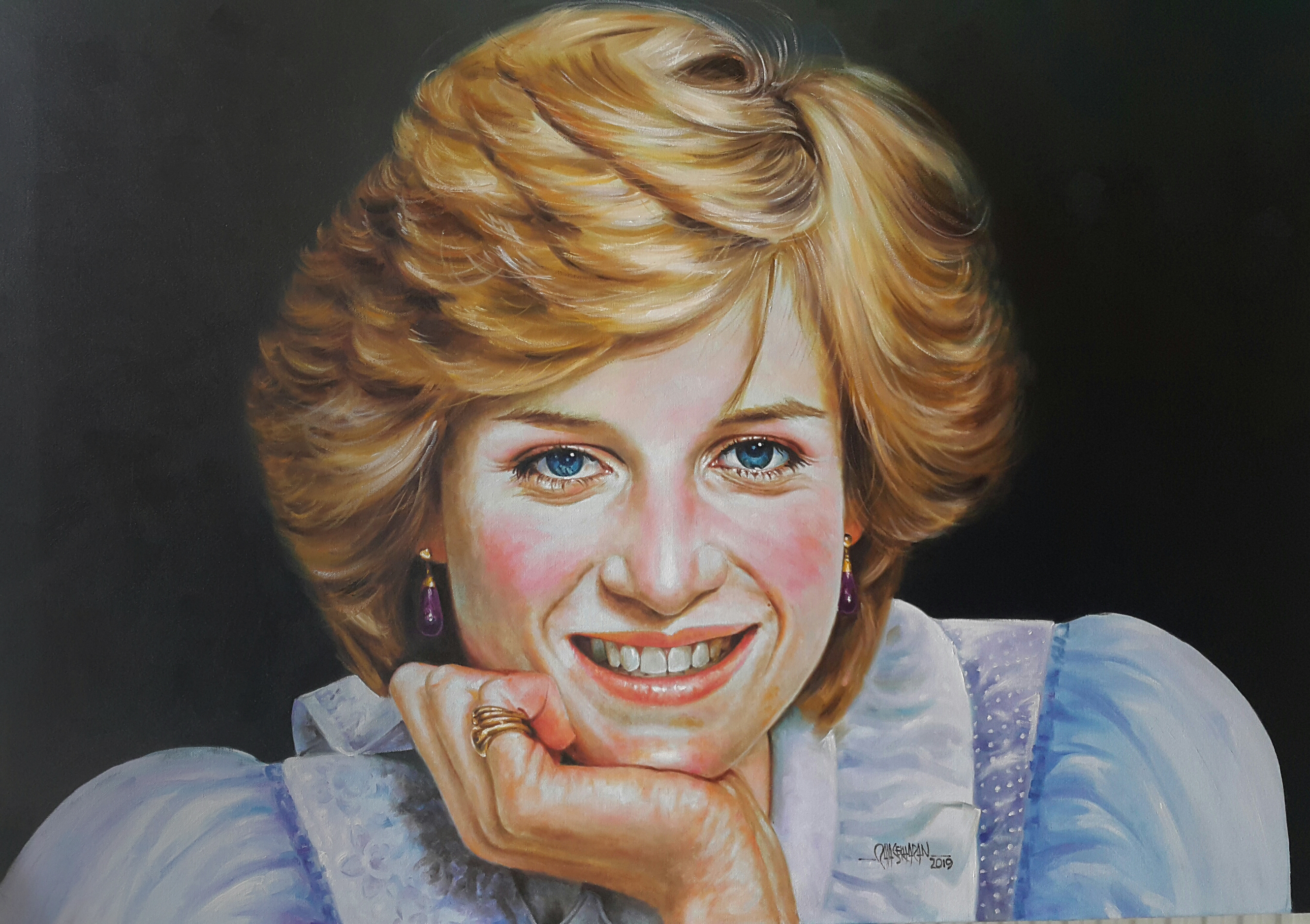
Diana, Princess of Wales

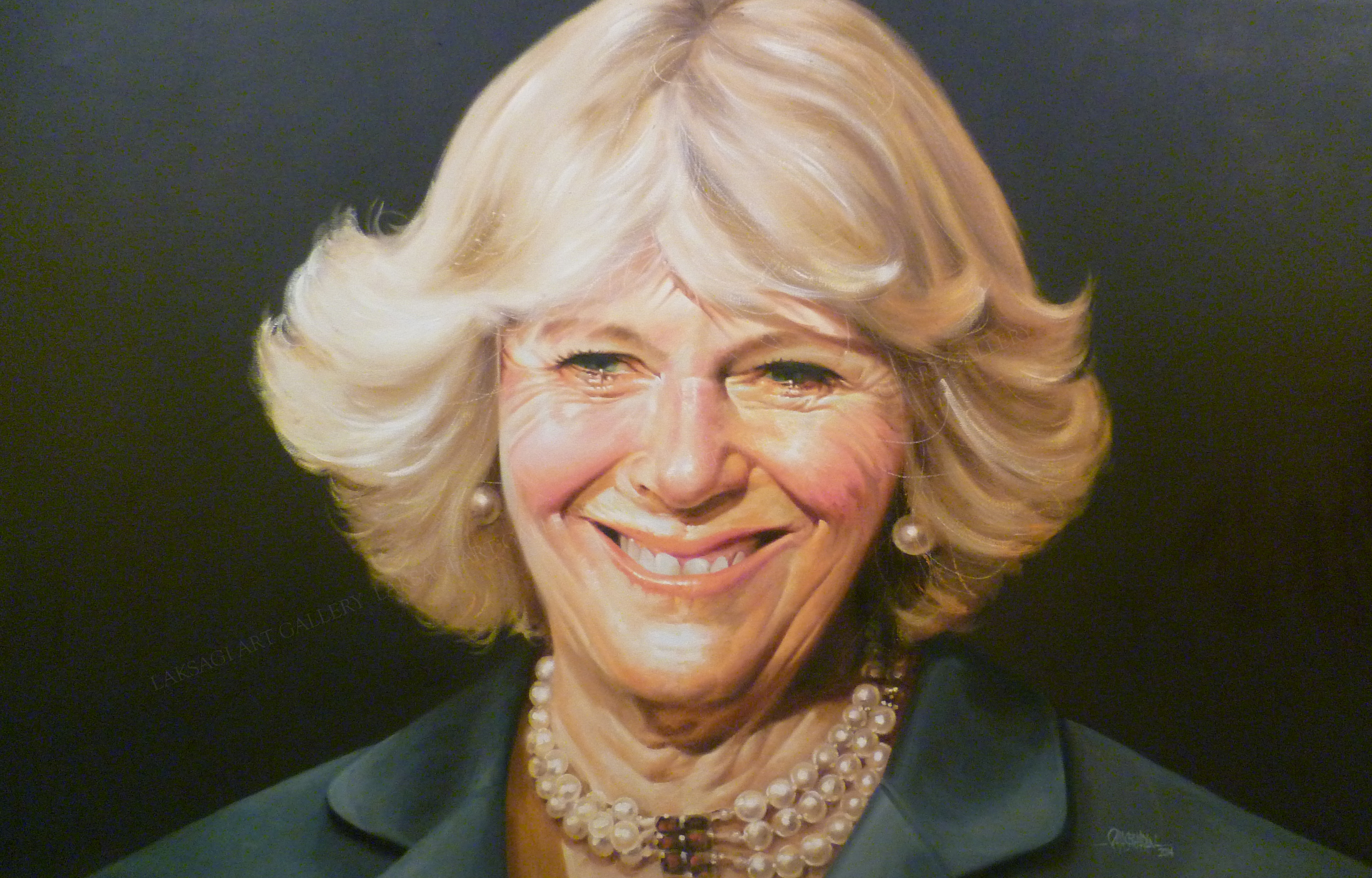
Camilla, Duchess of Cornwall

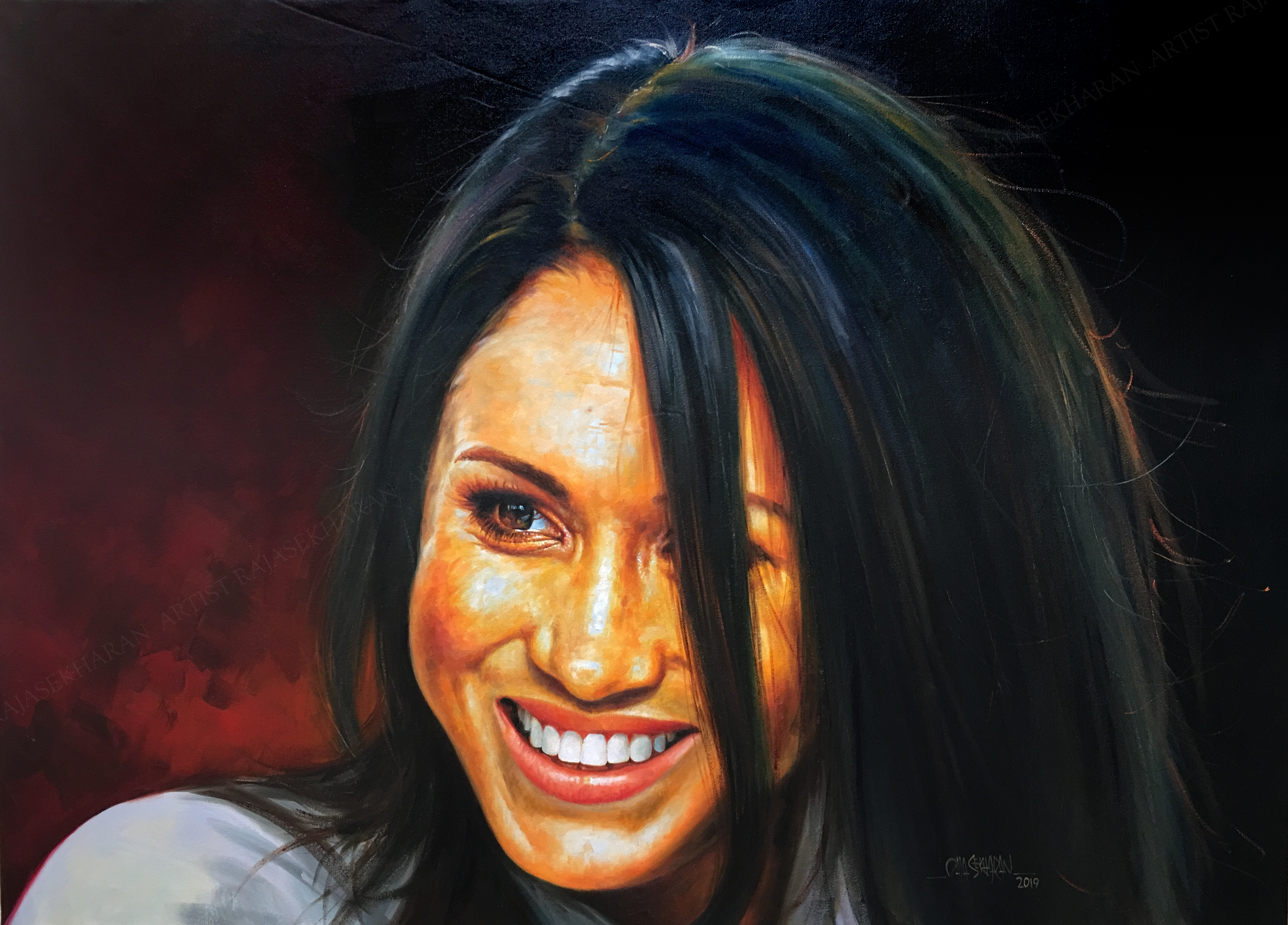
Meghan, Duchess of Sussex

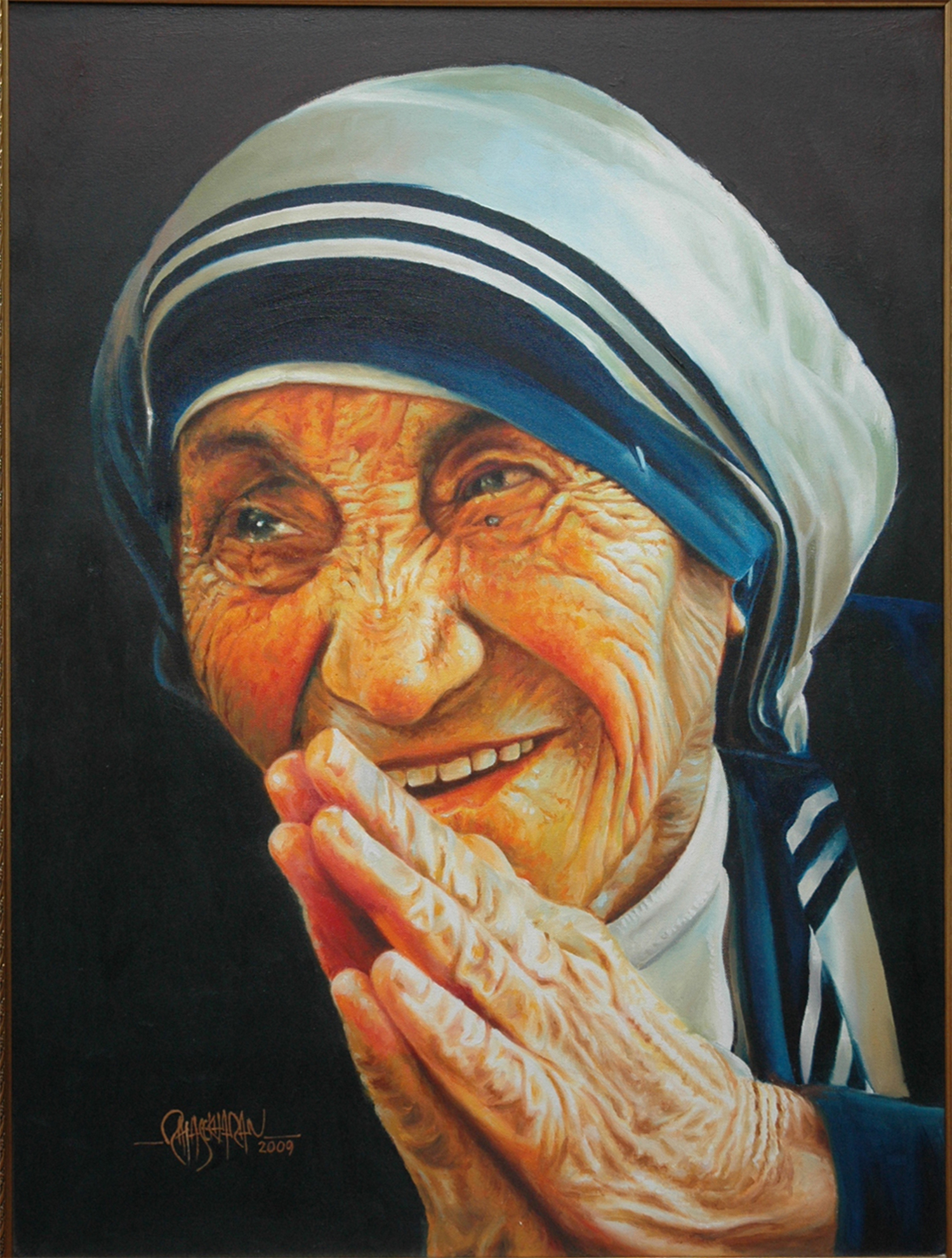
Mother Teresa

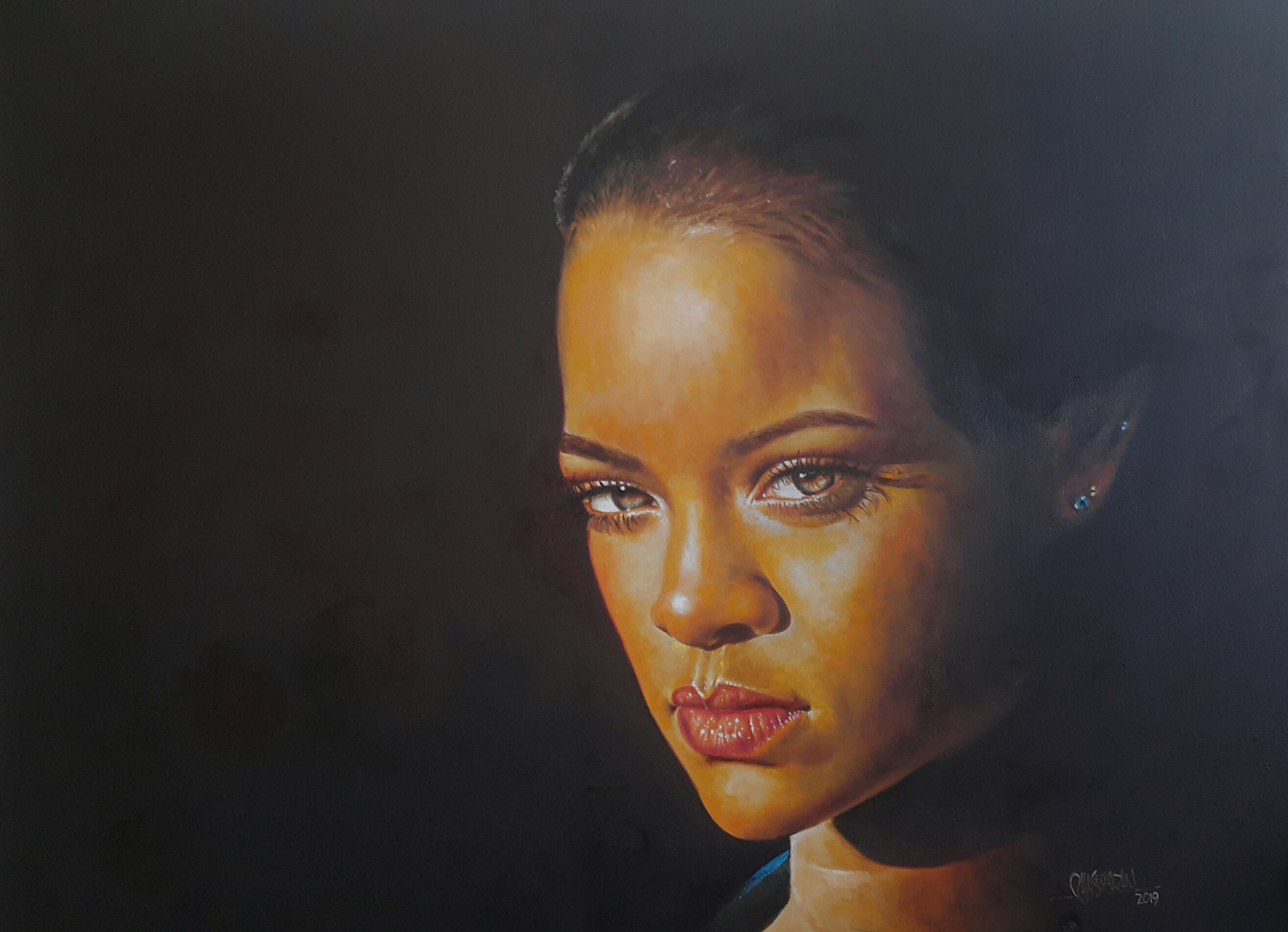
Rihanna
