= Ravi Vallathol =

Indian actor (1952–2020)

- Born: 25 November 1952; Tirur, Malappuram, Kerala, India
- Died: 25 April 2020 (aged 67); Thiruvananthapuram, Kerala, India
- Resting place: Thiruvananthapuram
- Education: Mar Ivanios College, Thiruvananthapuram Kerala University
- Occupations: Actor; Performer; Model
- Years active: 1980–2016
- Spouse: Geetha Lakshmi
- Parents: T. N. Gopinathan Nair; Soudamini
- Relatives: Vallathol Narayana Menon (uncle); Kuttippurathu Kesavan Nair (grandfather); Meenakshi; V. Nandakumar

Ravi Vallathol (25 November 1952 – 25 April 2020) was an Indian actor, mainly noted for his acting in many famous serials, including the first serial in Malayalam.

== Biography ==
He was born as the son of famous Drama legend T. N. Gopinathan Nair and Soudamini. He was the grandnephew of the famous Malayalam poet Vallathol Narayana Menon.

He acted in more than 100 TV series and more than 50 Movies. He wrote 25 short stories and a few plays. Some of his short stories were made into TV serials and his play Revathikkoru Pavakkutty was remade into a movie in the same name. He played some noted roles in famous Malayalam movies like Nee Varuvolam and Godfather.

He was awarded best actor in the Kerala State Television Awards for his performance in the TV series ‘American Dreams'. He was also awarded best actor in the Asianet Television Awards for his performance in the soap opera series Parijatham.

== Early life ==
He was born as eldest among three children to T. N. Gopinathan Nair, a writer and drama artiste of All India Radio and Soudamini in Vallathol family of Tirur. He was grandnephew of Mahakavi Vallathol Narayana Menon and grandson of P. K. Narayana Pillai and Kuttipurathu Kesavan Nair. He was also the cousin of popular film actor T. P. Madhavan. He had a younger brother, V. Nandakumar and a younger sister, Meenakshy. He did his schooling at Sisuvihar, Model H.S. and was graduated from Mar Ivanios College, Thiruvananthapuram and did his Post Graduation at Kerala University, Karyavattom.

Ravi Vallathol made his debut as an actor on the small screen in 1986 with the serial 'Vaitharani' in Doordarshan, scripted by his father, the late T.N. Gopinathan Nair and directed by noted Malayalam poet, songwriter and director P. Bhaskaran He also acted in more than 100 television serials including American Dreams in Asianet. He entered Malayalam film industry by writing the song “Thazhvarayil manju poothu" in the 1976 movie Madhuram Thirumadhuram. The movie he first acted in was Swathi Tirunal directed by Lenin Rajendran. He acted in 46 movies in his career including movies like Godfather, Vishnulokam, Nee Varuvolam and Mathilukal. He acted in seven movies directed by the internationally known Malayalam director Adoor Gopalakrishnan. The Dolphins was his last movie.

He completed 26 years in Malayalam television industry in 2012. He published more than 25 short stories. His stories Devaranjini and Nimanjanam were made into serials. Ravi acted and scripted many dramas such as Mazha, Ayaal.

His stage play Revathikkoru Pavakkutty was made into a film.

== Personal life ==
He was married to Geethalakshmi on 1 January 1980. The couple had no children. They were running an organisation for mentally challenged people named "Thanal". He died in his own residence in Thiruvananthapuram on 25 April 2020, due to a massive heart attack, aged 67.

== Awards ==
- Kerala State Television Award for Best Actor 2003: American Dreams
- Kerala Sangeetha Nataka Akademi Award 2012
- Asianet Television Awards 2011 – Best Character Actor: Paarijatham

== Filmography ==
1. 2016 - Autobiography of a Stray Dog- as Voice Artiste
2. 2014 - Polytechnique
3. 2014 - The Dolphins
4. 2013 - Weeping Boy
5. 2013 - Silence
6. 2013 - Idukki Gold ..... Sadanandan
7. 2011 - Uppukandam Brothers Back in Action ..... Kuttan Maraar
8. 2010 - Kaaryasthan ..... Himself
9. 2008 - Oru Pennum Randanum
10. 2007 - Naalu Pennungal
11. 2006 - Ravanan....... Justice Raghava Menon
12. 2006 - The Don...Dileep's father
13. 2004 - Nizhalkuthu
14. 2004 - Kusruthi..... Sree Vallabhan
15. 2002 - Pranayamanithooval ..... Vishwanath
16. 2002 - Chathurangam ..... Ramachandran
17. 2001 - Dhosth
18. 2001 - Pranaya Manthram
19. 2000 - Indriyam
20. 2000 - Dada Sahib.... Magistrate
21. 1999 - Stalin Sivadas .... Manoj
22. 1999 - Kannezhuthi Pottum Thottu ..... Chackochi
23. 1998 - Samaantharangal ..... Murali
24. 1997 - Kalyana Unnikal
25. 1997 - Kalyaanakkacheri
26. 1997 - Nee Varuvolam
27. 1997 - Hitler Brothers ..... Kuttan Pillai
28. 1996 - Kazhakam
29. 1996 - Kadhaapurushan ..... Kunjunni's Half Brother
30. 1995 - Sadaram...... Madhavan
31. 1994 - Sagaram Sakshi ..... Adv. Radhakrishnan Nair
32. 1994 - Vidheyan..... Patelar's nephew
33. 1994 - Commissioner ..... K. M. Varghese
34. 1994 - Puthran .... Alexander
35. 1993 - Bhoomi Geetham ...Devan
36. 1993 - Dhruvam... Police Constable
37. 1992 - Sargam
38. 1992 - Utsavamelam
39. 1991 - Aanaval Mothiram
40. 1991 - Vishnulokam
41. 1991 - Ottayal Pattalam
42. 1991 - Godfather ..... Balakrishnan
43. 1990 - Ee Thanutha Veluppan Kalathu .... Doctor
44. 1990 - Kottayam Kunjachan .... Joy
45. 1990 - Mathilukal ... Razzaq
46. 1989 - Oru Sayahnathinte Swapnam
47. 1989 - Season ...News Reporter
48. 1989 - Nayanangal
49. 1987 - Swathi Thirunal .... Singer

== Television career ==
- Eran Nilavu (flowers)
- Sparsham (Media one)
- Eran Nilavu (DD)
- Chandralekha (Asianet)
- Badra (Surya TV)
- Nandanam (Surya TV)
- Vrindravanam (Asianet)
- Alvudinte Albudhavilakku (Asianet)
- Devimahatmyam (Asianet)
- Manal Nagaram (Asianet)
- Paarijatham (Asianet)
- Sreeguruvayoorappan (Surya TV)
- Ammakkayi (Surya TV)
- Kanakinavu (Surya TV)
- Sundarippovu (Amrita TV)
- American Dreams (Asianet)
- Summer in America (Kairali TV)
- Swarnamayooram (Asianet)
- Nizhalukal (asianet)
- Vasundhara Medicals (Asianet)
- Aruna
- Vaitharani (1996- Doordarshan Malayalam)
- Manalnagaram
- May flower
- Pravasam
