= Parthajit Baruah =

Indian filmmaker and writer

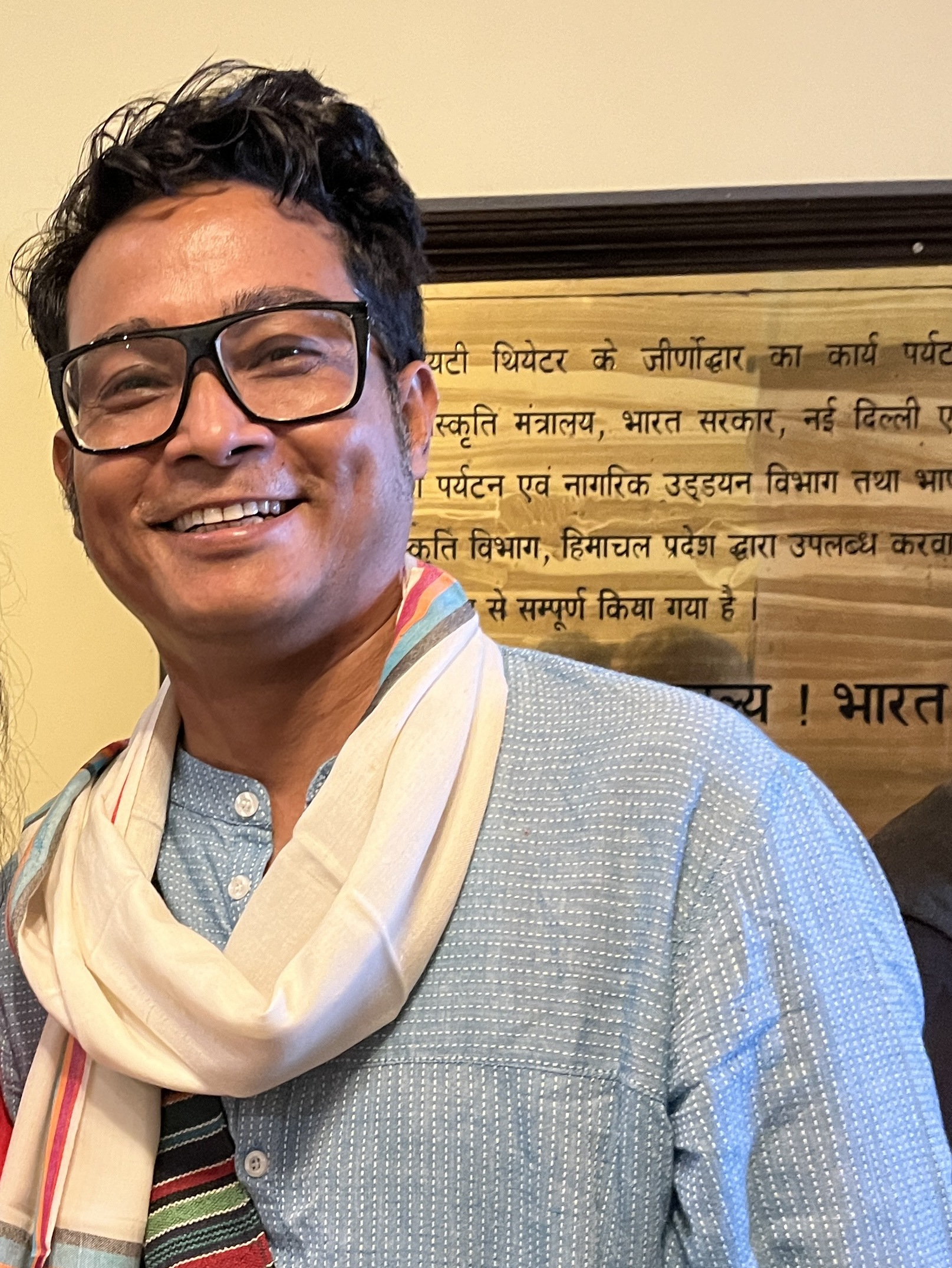
- Parthajit Baruah in 2024
- Born: Kampur, Nagaon, Assam
- Occupations: Filmmaker, Documentary Maker, Film Historian, Writer, Lecturer, Editor (North East Film Journal)
- Parent(s): Prasanna Kumar Baruah (father), Dinmai Gogoi (Mother)
- Writing career
- Years active: 2014 – present
- Notable works: Neli's Story (2023), Jyoti Kakaideu (2024), The Dhemaji Tragedy (2016), Jyotiprasad, Joymoti, Indramalati and Beyond: The History of Assamese Cinema (2021)
- Notable awards: Assam State Best Film Critic Award (2018)
- Website: parthajitbaruah.com

Parthajit Baruah is a filmmaker, documentary filmmaker, film historian, and writer from Assam, India. He has authored several scholarly books on cinema, including Face to Face: The Cinema of Adoor Gopalakrishnan (2016). His research extends to significant projects on Assamese cinema, undertaken at the National Film Archive of India, where he has contributed to preserving and documenting the region's cinematic heritage. As a filmmaker, Baruah has directed 13 documentaries and a feature film, The Nellie Story (2023), focusing on socio-political themes, showcasing his commitment to addressing critical issues through visual storytelling.

== Early life and education ==
He was born at Kampur in Nagaon district of Assam. His father, Prasanna Kumar Baruah, was born in Sibsagar District and he served for Indian Army. Later he founded the Sunlit Studios in 1965. Parthajit Barua lost his father while attending school. His mother, Dinamai Gogoi, is a teacher. She was the editor of the wall magazine of Ferguson College, Pune.

Baruah holds a Master's degree in English Literature from the University of Pune and later pursued an M.Phil in Film Adaptation: Shakespeare on Celluloid. He later received his doctorate in Film and Literature: Shakespeare in Select Indian Cinema. He is currently the Editor-in-Chief of North East Film Journal and Senior Lecturer at Renaissance Junior College, Nagaon.

== Books and films ==
Baruah's book Jyotiprasad, Joymoti, Indramalati and Beyond: History of Assamese Cinema deals with the life and works of Jyotiprasad Agarwala, one of the pioneers of Indian cinema. His book A History of India’s North-East Cinema is set for publication.

Baruah's documentary The Dhemaji Tragedy, about a bombing on 15 August 2004, by militant group United Liberation Front of Assam (ULFA) at Dhemaji parade ground was appreciated in several film festivals.

Baruah's debut feature film Nellier Kotha (The Nellie Story) takes a humanizing look at the Nellie massacre, a dark chapter in the socio-political history of Assam.
