= Mathilukal (film) =

1989 Indian film

- Poster designed by Gayathri Ashokan
- Directed by: Adoor Gopalakrishnan
- Screenplay by: Adoor Gopalakrishnan
- Based on: Mathilukal by Vaikom Muhammad Basheer
- Produced by: Adoor Gopalakrishnan
- Starring: Mammootty
- Cinematography: Mankada Ravi Varma
- Edited by: M. Mani
- Music by: Vijaya bhaskar
- Production company: Adoor Gopalakrishnan Productions
- Distributed by: Jubilee Productions
- Release date: 18 May 1990
- Running time: 120 minutes
- Country: India
- Language: Malayalam

Mathilukal (transl. Walls) is a 1990 Indian Malayalam-language film written, directed, and produced by Adoor Gopalakrishnan based on the autobiographical novel of the same name by Vaikom Muhammad Basheer. The film focuses on the prison life of Vaikom Muhammad Basheer and the love between him and Narayani, a female inmate of the prison, who remains unseen throughout the film. Mammootty plays the role of Vaikom Muhammad Basheer while K. P. A. C. Lalitha gives voice to Narayani. The film was screened at the Venice Film Festival.

On the centenary of Indian cinema in April 2013, Forbes included Mammootty's performance in the film on its list, "25 Greatest Acting Performances of Indian Cinema".

== Plot ==
Vaikom Muhammed Basheer is imprisoned on charges of sedition. He is unlike the other prisoners, very inquisitive and armed with sardonic wit. Everyone takes a liking to him and even turns to him in times of distress. He strikes up a friendship with the Warden(Thilakan) and an enthusiastic jailor (Sreenath). Due to his unique charisma and popularity as an author, he is afforded privileges that other prisoners don't have. His written works are greatly appreciated by the policemen who supply him with papers to finish his work. One day, Basheer is informed that he will be released soon as all political prisoners are pardoned. But unexpectedly, Basheer's name was missing from the list. His enthusiasm and happiness take a hit, and he is filled with uneasiness and worry. Due to the eerie solitude of the prison complex, Basheer starts to get depressed. The other inmates try to encourage him to accompany them in making a vegetable garden in front of the neighbouring women's prison compound.

Bashir falls in love with a woman in the neighbouring prison compound. They are separated by a high wall, and thus, they never see each other and have to devise ingenious ways to communicate. They exchange gifts by throwing the packages up high so that they cross the wall. Narayani, Bashir's love, is presented as a female voice and never appears in person in the film. Their exchanges are raw, unhinged, and unfiltered. Narayani then comes up with a plan for a meeting, and they decide to meet at the hospital a few days later. But before that, Basheer is released, unexpectedly. For once, he does not want the freedom he had craved for. Bashir is released and isn't able to convey it to Narayani. Bashir helplessly looks at the walls and leaves the jail in tears.

== Cast ==
- Mammootty as Vaikom Muhammad Basheer
- Murali as Basheer's childhood friend
- Ravi Vallathol as Razaq
- Sreenath as Aniyan, the friendly and enthusiastic young jailor
- Karamana Janardanan Nair as a prisoner
- Thilakan as Warden
- M. R. Gopakumar as Prisoner
- Azeez as Inspector
- Babu Namboothiri as a political prisoner
- K. P. A. C. Lalitha as Narayani (voice only)

== Awards ==
The film has won the following awards since its release:

1989 Venice Film Festival (Italy)

- FIPRESCI Prize - Adoor Gopalakrishnan
- UNICEF Award - Adoor Gopalakrishnan

1989 National Film Awards (India)

- Best Director - Adoor Gopalakrishnan
- Best Actor - Mammootty also for Oru Vadakkan Veeragatha
- Best Audiography - N. Harikumar
- Best Regional Film (Malayalam)

1990 Filmfare Awards South

- Filmfare Award for Best Actor - Malayalam - Mammootty

1990 Kerala State Film Awards (India)

- Best Story - Vaikom Muhammad Basheer

1990 Amiens International Film Festival (France)

- OCIC Award - Adoor Gopalakrishnan

2002 Aubervilliers International Children's Film Festival (France)

- Best Film
- Grand Prize for Best Director - Adoor Gopalakrishnan
