= Nee Varuvolam =

1997 Indian film

- Directed by: Sibi Malayil
- Written by: G. A. Lal
- Produced by: Raju Mathew; Prem Prakash
- Starring: Dileep; Divya Unni; Thilakan; Jagathy Sreekumar; Manju Pillai
- Cinematography: Anandakuttan
- Edited by: L. Bhoominathan
- Music by: Johnson
- Production companies: Century; Prakash Movie Tone
- Distributed by: Century Release
- Release date: 28 October 1997
- Country: India
- Language: Malayalam

Nee Varuvolam (transl. Until you come) is a 1997 Indian Malayalam-language Psychological drama film directed by Sibi Malayil and written by G. A. Lal. It stars Dileep and Divya Unni in the lead roles.

== Plot ==
The film is about how the life of a teacher changes after his sister gets raped by 2 men under disguise of police officers.

== Cast ==
- Dileep as Hari
- Divya Unni as Revathi
- Thilakan as Madhavan Nair
- Jagathy Sreekumar as Manoharan Pilla
- Manju Pillai as Santha
- Roslin as Hari's mother
- Rekha Mohan as Sudha, Hari's elder sister
- Baby Ambili as Suja, Hari's younger sister
- Chali Pala as Gopalan
- Elias Babu as Revathy's father
- Ponnamma Babu as Revathy's mother
- Ravi Vallathol as Chandrasekharan
- Indrans as Ajayan
- Sandeep as Raju, Revathi's brother

== Production ==
on 2023, Salim Kumar revealed he was originally cast of the movie.

== Soundtrack ==
The music has been given by Johnson, with lyrics by Gireesh Puthenchery.

Nee Varoluvolam

Soundtrack album by Johnson
- Released: 1999
- Genre: Film soundtrack

| Track # | Song | Artist(s) |
|---|---|---|
| 1 | "Ee Thennalum" | Daleema |
| 2 | "Thaane Poliyum..." | K. J. Yesudas |
| 3 | "Poonilaavo..." | K. S. Chithra, Biju Narayanan |
| 4 | "Thaane Poliyum" [Duet] | K. J. Yesudas, K. S. Chithra |
| 5 | "Thaane Poliyum Kaithiri Poleh" | K. S. Chithra |
