= Mukhamukham =

- Directed by: Adoor Gopalakrishnan
- Written by: Adoor Gopalakrishnan
- Produced by: K. Ravindran Nair
- Starring: P. Gangadharan Nair; Karamana Janardanan Nair; Thilakan; Ashokan; Kaviyoor Ponnamma
- Cinematography: Mankada Ravi Varma
- Edited by: M. Mani
- Music by: M. B. Srinivasan
- Production company: General Pictures
- Release date: 16 September 1984
- Running time: 107 minutes
- Country: India
- Language: Malayalam

Mukhamukham (transl. Face to face) is a 1984 Indian Malayalam-language drama film written and directed by Adoor Gopalakrishnan.

== Plot ==
The film opens in the early 1950s, showing Sreedharan, the protagonist, as a very popular communist leader and trade union activist. He is forced to go underground after being associated with the murder of a factory owner. His party presumes that he has died even erects a memorial for him. But he makes an unexpected comeback almost 10 years later, after the first communist ministry gained and lost power in Kerala and after the Communist Party of India has split.

On his return, he spends his time sleeping and drinking. His comeback is first a puzzle and then an embarrassment to his comrades and family. As the disappointment on his new face grows, he is found murdered. The film ends when both the communist parties jointly celebrate his martyrdom.

== Cast ==
- P. Gangadharan Nair as Sridharan
- Karamana Janardanan Nair
- Ashokan as Sudhakaran as a man
- Kaviyoor Ponnamma
- K. P. A. C. Lalitha
- Vishwanathan as Sudhakaran as a boy
- Krishan Kumar
- B. K. Nair
- Alummoodan
- Azeez
- Somashekharan Nair
- Omanakuttan as Police man

== Reception ==
Iqbal Masud of The Indian Express wrote, "This is the first attempt in our cinema to get inside the situation of a willed and committed revolutionary and to depict with masterly imagination and invention, what happens there under the duress of a harsh and interminable battle against a formidable system." Writing for The Guardian, film critic Derek Malcolm said that “The film is not only a deeply personal statement but an intensely introspective one. It has of course been seen as some sort of indirect criticism of the Communist Party, though it is nothing of the sort. What is so impressive about it is not only its original subject matter but the fastidious style with which it is made"

== Awards ==
The film has been nominated for and won the following awards since its release:

1984 FIPRESCI Prize (New Delhi)
1984 National Film Awards (India)

- Won - Best Director - Adoor Gopalakrishnan
- Won - Best Screenplay - Adoor Gopalakrishnan
- Won - Best Feature Film in Malayalam
- Won - Best Audiography

== Legacy ==
Girish Kasaravalli included the film in his top 10 Indian films stating, "Adoor introduced a unique way of depicting the socio-political situation of contemporary India. It is metaphorical."
