= Kathapurushan =

- A screenshot from the film
- Directed by: Adoor Gopalakrishnan
- Written by: Adoor Gopalakrishnan
- Produced by: Adoor Gopalakrishnan; NHK (co-producer)
- Starring: Vishwanathan; Mini Nair; Aranmula Ponnamma; Narendra Prasad; Urmila Unni; Babu Namboothiri
- Cinematography: Mankada Ravi Varma
- Edited by: M. Mani
- Music by: Vijaya Bhaskar
- Production companies: Adoor Gopalakrishnan Productions; NHK
- Release date: 1995
- Running time: 107 minutes
- Countries: India; Japan
- Language: Malayalam

Kathapurushan (English: The Man of the Story) is a 1995 Indo-Japanese Malayalam-language period drama film written and directed by Adoor Gopalakrishnan. It was produced by Gopalakrishnan and NHK. The film stars Vishwanathan, Mini Nair, Aranmula Ponnamma, Narendra Prasad and Urmila Unni.

Kathapurushan is a journey exploring the history of that time in the state of Kerala in India.

The film won the National Film Award for Best Feature Film at the National Film Awards in 1996.

== Cast ==
- Vishwanathan as Kunjunni
- Mini Nair as Meenakshi
- Aranmula Ponnamma as Muthassi
- Narendra Prasad as Vaasu
- Urmila Unni as Kunjunni's mother
- Babu Namboothiri as Veluchar
- Abhirami as Podimol
- Oduvil Unni Krishnan as Paachu Pillai

== Plot ==
Kunjunni's parents separate soon after his birth, and he is left to be cared by his mother, lacking paternal care and affection. His mother has the help of his grandmother, an estate manager, and his friend Meenakshi, daughter of a maidservant in Kunjunni's house.

Inspired by his uncle, initially a Gandhian and later a Marxist, Kunjunni is drawn to left-wing ideologies at college, believing that communism is the answer to social hardships and inequalities. Eventually he joins an extremist Marxist group. After an attack on a police station, Kunjunni is arrested and charged, but is later acquitted.

Kunjunni matures with experience, yet feels lonely and disillusioned. He tries to turn his life around; on a quest to find his childhood friend, Meenakshi, he does so and marries her. He sells his properties to a newly wealthy man, whose father was once a servant in Kunjuni's house and moves to an ordinary house, trying to live a normal family life with his wife and son.

One day, a college classmate, a journalist, seeks to interview him, which Kunjunni declines. Later, Kujunni, with the help of his journalist friend, publishes his first story, "Karaksharangal". However, due to its subversive content, the government bans it. When Kunjunni reads this in the newspaper, he begins to laugh, with his family, at this corrupt world.

== Awards ==
The film has won the following awards since its release:

1996 National Film Awards (India)

- Won - National Film Award for Best Feature Film - Adoor Gopalakrishnan
- Won - National Film Award for Best Supporting Actress - Aranmula Ponnamma

1997 Bombay International Film Festival (India)

- Won - FIPRESCI Prize - Adoor Gopalakrishnan
