= Oru Pennum Randaanum =

2008 film by Adoor Gopalakrishnan

Oru Pennum Randaanum (A Woman and Two Men)
- DVD Cover
- Directed by: Adoor Gopalakrishnan
- Written by: Adoor Gopalakrishnan based on the short stories of Thakazhi Sivasankara Pillai
- Produced by: Adoor Gopalakrishnan Productions; Benzy Martin; Doordarshan
- Starring: M. R. Gopakumar; Seema G. Nair; Nedumudi Venu; Jagannathan; Vijayaraghavan; Sudheesh; Jagadeesh; Praveena; Ravi Vallathol; Manoj K. Jayan
- Cinematography: M. J. Radhakrishnan
- Edited by: B. Ajithkumar
- Music by: Isaac Thomas
- Release date: 2008
- Running time: 115 minutes
- Language: Malayalam

Oru Pennum Randaanum (Translation: A Woman and Two Men) also known as A Climate for Crime is a 2008 Malayalam feature film written and directed by Adoor Gopalakrishnan.

The film has four separate chapters, each based on independent short stories written by Thakazhi Sivasankara Pillai. The film is about four crimes of different nature that happen in different contexts and situations. The setting is the Princely State of Travancore, South India in the 1940s. The Second World War being fought in Europe at that time had terrible impact on the colonial British India with increasing scarcity of basic commodities and rising unemployment. The stories in this film span from crimes committed by the deprived to the comparatively privileged landed gentry.

== Plot ==
The four chapters of the film tell stories, which are independent of each other. The only connection between them is the recurring theme of crime. With the flow of the movie, there is an increase in the complexity of the crimes.

Kallante Makan (The son of the thief)

Kunjunni is the school going son of the thief, Neelantan. He enters into a fight with his classmate, Kurien, over the profession of his father. Neelantan approaches Kurien's father, Mathai, and urges him to leave the children alone from such prejudices. Mathai is offended by this and in retaliation prepares a petition to the police chief demanding preventive custody of Neelantan. Upon Neelantan's arrest, Kunjunni persuades his mother to talk him out of his profession. Two years later, Kunjunni comes home with the news that Kurien's house has been burgled. A heartbroken Kunjunni realizes the truth about the burglary when he sees the full meal and new clothes at his home.

Niyamavum Neethiyum (Law and justice)

The new police Inspector is upright and decides to probe the 'unsolved' case of a theft in a merchant's shop. It is rumoured that the Head Constable Pillai had a liaison with the culprit and they shared the loot. Upon the Inspector's order, Pillai and his fellow-constable Mathu set out to solve the case. Though Mathu suggests to re-arrest the culprit, Pillai vacillates. While discussing this issue in a local bar, Mathu spots a moment of opportunity when he notices a rickshaw-puller opening an envelope of currency notes. Before the innocent victim comes to terms with the situation, he is arrested for the burglary. He is threatened that if he proceeds to defend himself or appeal, he will lose all his savings. The poor victim has hardly a choice.

Oru Koottukaran (One male friend )

Krishnankutty is a college student nurturing an infatuation for the servant girl at the lodge. The relationship takes a turn when the girl starts showing symptoms of pregnancy. Krishnan Kutty is heartbroken by this new development, as he is under obligation to marry the daughter of his uncle. Pushed to make a choice between suicide and abortion, he seeks help from his friend, a lawyer. Together they seek out a quack who performs abortions. But the meeting with the quack stirs new feelings in Krishnan Kutty and he gets prepared to face the challenge in his life.

Pankiyamma (Pankiyamma)

Panki is the village beauty. Rama Kurup, a middle aged man, forsakes everything to marry her. One night, his suspicion is confirmed when he finds her with a paramour. In the scuffle that follows, Kurup stabs his younger adversary. He goes into hiding as a case is registered against him for attempted murder. As time passes after an intense police investigation, a humiliated Kurup returns home on bail. As the case proceeds in the court of law, supporters of the two sides clash on the streets. Panki, remains non-committal even after being urged by both men to take their side. Both the men are sentenced to three years rigorous imprisonment for inciting murder and violence among their followers. In prison, the two men end their enmity and decide to confront Panki together, on their release.

== Cast ==
Kallante Makan (The Thief)

- M. R. Gopakumar as Neelantan, the thief
- Seema G. Nair as Neelantan's wife
- Master Amal Jose as Neelantan's son
- Indrans as Mathai, the neighbour
- KPAC Leela as Maria, Mathai's wife
- Master Brolin Thomas as Mathai's son
- Mukkottu Gopalakrishnan as Head master
- Arya Alphonse as School teacher
- Gopan as Police Constable
- Padmanabha Panicker as Police Constable

Niyamavum Neethiyum (The Police)

- Nedumudi Venu as Maathu – Police constable
- Jagannathan as Kuttan Pillai – the head constable
- Vijayaraghavan as Police Inspector
- Krishnakumar as The rikshaw- puller
- James Mukalel as Bar-tender
- P.Sreekumar as The Magistrate
- Prof. Aliyar as Bench-clerk
- Priyanka as Witness
- Anup as Witness
- Padmanabha Panicker as Witness
- Ambootty as Inmate
- Vakkom Mohan as Pleader

Oru Koottukaran (Two Men and a Woman)

- Sudheesh as Krishnankutty – the student
- Jagadeesh as Advocate – his senior friend
- P.C. Soman as The Quack
- Anup as Boat-man
- Nandan as Advocate's relative

Pankiyamma (One Woman, Two Men)

- Praveena as Pankiyamma
- Ravi Vallathol as Her husband
- Manoj.K.Jayan as Her paramour
- Sukumari as The narrator/Pankiyamma's neighbour
- Babu Namboothiri as Her husband
- G.K.Pillai as Old Prison inmate
- Subair as Police Constable
- Sasthanthala Sahadeven as Jailer
- Krishna Prasad as Father of Pankiyamma's baby

== Production ==
The project to make films on Thakazhi Sivasankara Pillai's stories came when Doordarshan in their Timeless Classics series wanted to compile works of writers in different languages who have produced classic literature. This movie was filmed just after the previous film of Adoor- Naalu Pennungal, which was the first film to be part of the project. Both the films have a four-chapter-structure based on independent short stories by Thakazhi Sivasankara Pillai. Both the films also share the same geographical and temporal setting.

The director made the following statement about the movie in his official website – "The four chapters of the film tell stories independent of each other. What connects them is the recurring theme of crime. Starting from simple, parable like tales about ordinary people, the narrative slowly takes on questions of love, loyalty and morality leading to complex issues of life. It culminates in the story of the contemporary legend of Panki, the irresistible village beauty who lives naturally. Unlike in my earlier films, here I have used dialogue predominantly to comment, endorse or simply report on the course of the plot to lend the story a narrative form akin to that of the epics where reportage plays a major role in making the experience larger- than- life."

== Reception ==
The films was premiered in the International Film Festival of India, Goa, 2008.

The film has also been exhibited so far in

- Dubai International Film Festival, 2008.
- The 38th edition of the International Film Festival Rotterdam, 2009.
- The 23rd edition of the Fribourg International Film Festival, 2009

The official website for the International Film Festival Rotterdam lauded the movie saying that "[e]ach story echoes the burden of time and place, yet is universal." It also adds that "[a]lthough this never-ending search for a better life, human dignity and love is seriously rendered, it still radiates the romantic idea of human endurance, hope, guilt and a sense of justice. That makes this rather calm and lyrical film, which is obviously deeply culturally rooted, universal."

== Awards ==
The film won the Kerala State Film Awards for 2008 for best feature film, director, scenarist, second best female actor (Praveena) and sound recording (T. Krishnanunni and Harikumar).
