= Naalu Pennungal =

2007 film by Adoor Gopalakrishnan

- A Scene from the segment - Nithyakanyaka from the movie
- Directed by: Adoor Gopalakrishnan
- Written by: Thakazhi Sivasankara Pillai; Adoor Gopalakrishnan
- Produced by: Adoor Gopalakrishnan; Benzy Martin
- Starring: Padmapriya; Nandita Das; Kavya Madhavan; Geetu Mohandas; Manju Pillai
- Cinematography: M. J. Radhakrishnan
- Edited by: B. Ajithkumar
- Music by: Isaac Thomas Kottukapally
- Distributed by: Emil & Eric Digital Films Pvt.Ltd.
- Release date: 2 November 2007
- Running time: 105 minutes
- Country: India
- Language: Malayalam

Naalu Pennungal (transl. Four women) is a 2007 Malayalam language anthology film produced and directed by Adoor Gopalakrishnan based on four short stories written by Thakazhi Sivasankara Pillai. The film stars Padmapriya, Geetu Mohandas, Manju Pillai and Nandita Das in the major roles and KPAC Lalitha, Mukesh, Manoj K. Jayan, Kavya Madhavan, Sreejith Ravi, Nandu, Remya Nabeeshan, and M. R. Gopakumar in supporting roles.

The movie chronicles a journey of womanhood across assorted backdrops with a classic amalgamation of source matters and techniques that splendidly spans times and frames. The movie has four distinct parts, each adapted from separate short stories by Thakazhi Sivasankara Pillai. The parts narrate the stories of women from different strata of the society. Though the stories are not explicitly connected in narration, a pattern emerges in the flow of the movie, both in the chronological setting and the stature of the women.

For the film, Adoor Gopalakrishnan won Best Director and B. Ajithkumar for Best Editor at 55th National Film Awards.

== Plot ==
Naalu Pennungal is the story of four women from Kuttanad in Alappuzha district in Kerala. The stories are set in the years between the 1940s to the 1960s.

=== Oru Niyamalankanathinte Kadha ===
The first profile is the story of a street prostitute Kunjipennu and Pappukutty who decide to start a life as husband and wife. They have bound themselves in matrimony that does not have any legal sanction. When the law catches up with them, they do not have anything as evidence of their commitment to each other. The story ends in the court scene where the helpless couple is punished for the crime of prostitution.

=== Kanyaka ===
Kumari - literally, a virgin girl- is a farm worker who shouldered the responsibility of running her household at a very early age. Her father, having realized her advancing age, accepts a suitable marriage proposal for her. After the wedding, her husband, Narayanan, behaves strangely, as he evades any kind of contact with her, including verbal conversation and sexual activity. The husband's mysterious behaviour is accentuated by his gluttony. After a few days, the couple makes the customary visit to Kumari's house. Narayanan leaves Kumari in her house after the visit and never returns to bring her back. As days pass, rumours spread that she has been abandoned by him because of her infidelity. Her father, unable to bear the shame of it, picks up a fight with the neighbour who had brought the marriage proposal. Kumari, who had maintained silence so far, emerges from the house and declares that the marriage never happened.

=== Chinnu Amma ===
Chinnu Amma is a childless housewife. She lives a fairly contented life with her loving husband. Her husband works in a nearby town and she spends her time alone at home. One day, she is visited by Nara Pillai, a former classmate. Nara Pillai had run away to Tamil Nadu, long ago and now visits his village rarely. He is said to have made good in Tamil Nadu and speaks Malayalam with a heavy Tamil accent even when he is back in Kerala. Through their conversations, we realize that they both had an amorous encounter in their youth, from which Chinnu Amma escaped narrowly due to her fear of getting pregnant out of wedlock. Nara Pillai assumes that she is vulnerable and attempts to talk her into bed, promising her a healthy offspring. Chinnu Amma's mind vacillates, but at the end of the movie, she boldly declines the offer.

=== Nithyakanyaka ===
The last one is about an upper-middle-class girl named Kamakshi. She has a quiet life in a family composed of her widowed mother, an elder brother, and two sisters. The story begins with a marriage proposal for her, which fails as the groom prefers her younger sister. She silently witnesses the wedding. As the years pass, her elder brother also gets married. As she walks towards middle age, her youngest sister also gets married. Once the mother passes away, she is forced to move in with her younger sister's family. Things seem to go well initially, with her getting close to her nieces. Her sister's husband apologizes to her, for being the reason for her failed marriage proposal. However, problems surface as her sister gets jealous of her and starts imagining a non-existent affair between her husband and Kamakshi. She goes back home alone, refusing to live with either her brother or the youngest sister. She finally has broken the shackles of others controlling her life and has decided to live on her own.

== Cast ==
=== Oru Niyamalankanathinte Kadha ===
- Padmapriya Janakiraman as Kunjipennu (Voice by Praveena)
- Sreejith Ravi as Pappukutty, Kunjipennu's husband
- Sona Nair as Kunjipennu's friend
- Manoj K. Jayan as Ouseppu
- P. Sreekumar as the judge
- V Aliyar as the court assistant
- Punappara Ayyappan as the toddy shop owner

=== Kanyaka ===
- Geetu Mohandas as Kumari
- M. R. Gopakumar as Kumari's father
- Roslin as Kumari's mother
- Nandu as Narayanan, Kumari's husband
- Sethu Lakshmi as Narayanan's mother
- Sreekala V. K. as Parukutty, Kumari's relative

=== Chinnu Amma ===
- Manju Pillai as Chinnu Ammu
- Mukesh as Pottaykkal Naarapillai
- Murali as Ramanpillai, Chinnu's husband
- Babu Namboothiri as Govinda Menon
- Cherthala Lalitha as Chinnu's neighbor

=== Nithyakanyaka ===
- Nandita Das as Kamakshi (Voice by Geethu Mohandas)
- K. P. A. C. Lalitha as Kamakshi's mother
- Ashokan as Kuttan, Kamakshi's brother
- Kavya Madhavan as Subadhra, Kamakshi's younger sister
- Remya Nambeesan as Sarojam, Kamashi's youngest sister
- G. K. Pillai as Subadra's father in law
- Ravi Vallathol as Subadra's husband
- Manju Satheeshan as Kuttan's wife
- Krishna Prasad as Sarojam's husband

== Production ==
The project to make films on Thakazhi Sivasankara Pillai's stories came when Doordarshan in their Timeless Classics series wanted to compile works of writers in different languages who have produced classic literature. This was the first film in the project and was followed by Oru Pennum Randaanum in the next year. Both films have a four-chapter structure based on independent short stories by Thakazhi Sivasankara Pillai. The films also share the same geographical and temporal setting.

Adoor selected the stories on which the movie is based, from the 300-400 stories that Pillai wrote. They were originally written over a long period of time. The director stated that he chose these particular stories because of their current relevance. He has claimed that unlike his previous films, this one is less complex.

== Reception ==
The film premiered in the masters section of the Toronto International Film Festival in September, 2007. It has so far been screened at more than twenty festivals The Miami International Film Festival selected Adoor Gopalakrishnan's Naalu Pennungal. Besides Adoor, Geethu Mohandas who featured in the story 'Kanyaka', and Martin Sebastian, the co-producer of the film attended the film festival.

The film was also screened at the following festivals.

- 51st London film festival.
- Vienna Film Festival.
- Seattle International Film Festival.

== Legacy ==
Noted Marathi filmmaker Sachin Kundalkar said that his third film Gandha (Smell), an ensemble of three stories interconnected by the theme of 'smell', was inspired by Naalu Pennungal.
