= Adoor Gopalakrishnan =

Indian filmmaker and screenwriter (born 1941)

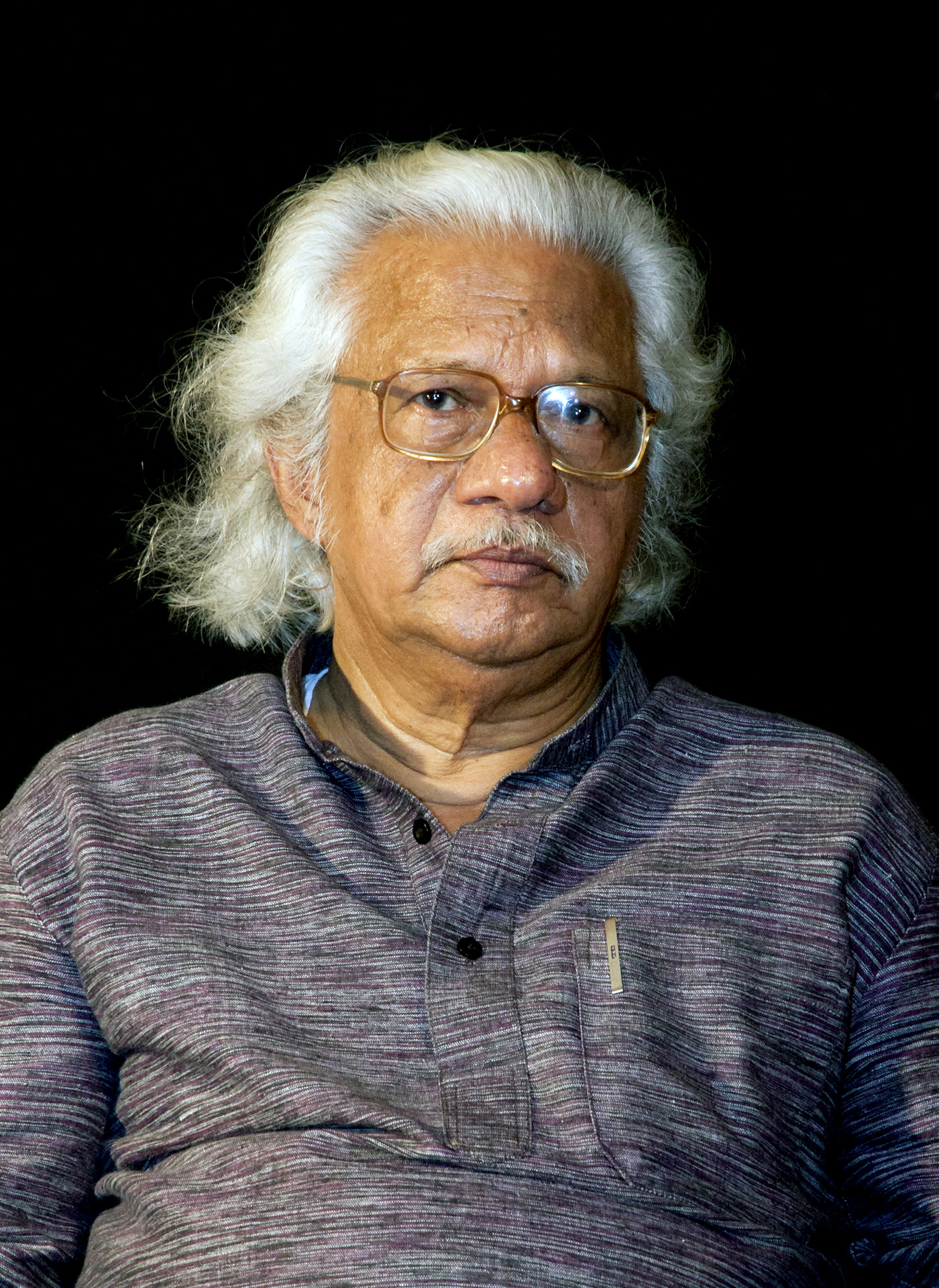
- At an event in Thiruvananthapuram in 2012
- Born: Mouttathu Gopalakrishnan Unnithan; 3 July 1941 (age 85); Mannadi, Adoor, Kollam district, Travancore, British India (present-day Pathanamthitta district, Kerala, India)
- Other name: Adoor
- Education: Film and Television Institute of India
- Occupations: Film director; screenwriter; film producer
- Years active: 1965–present
- Spouse: Sunanda (died 2015)
- Children: 1
- Awards: Padma Vibhushan (2006); Padma Shri (1984); Dadasaheb Phalke Award (2004)
- Website: adoorgopalakrishnan.com

Mouttathu Unnithan Gopalakrishnan (born 3 July 1941), known professionally as Adoor Gopalakrishnan, is an Indian film director, screenwriter, and producer who works in Malayalam cinema. With the release of his first feature film Swayamvaram (1972), Gopalakrishnan pioneered the "new wave" in Malayalam cinema during the 1970s. In a career spanning over five decades, Gopalakrishnan has made 12 feature films. His films often depict the society and culture of Kerala. Nearly all of his films premiered at Venice, Cannes and Toronto film festivals. Along with Satyajit Ray and Mrinal Sen, Gopalakrishnan is one of the most recognized Indian film directors in the world cinema.

For his films, Gopalakrishnan has won 16 National Film Awards, next only to Ray and Sen. He also won 17 Kerala State Film Awards. He was awarded the Padma Shri in 1984 and the Padma Vibhushan in 2006. He received the Dadasaheb Phalke Award in 2004 for his valuable contributions to Indian cinema. In 2016, he was awarded the J. C. Daniel Award, Kerala government's highest honour for contributions to Malayalam cinema. The University of Wisconsin-Milwaukee have established an archive and research center, the Adoor Gopalakrishnan Film Archive and Research Center, at their Peck School of Arts where research students will have access to 35 mm prints of the 11 feature films and several documentaries made by Gopalakrishnan.

== Early life ==
Gopalakrishnan was born on 3 July 1941 in the village of Pallikkal near Adoor, present-day Kerala, to a Malayali Nair Mouttathu family.

After securing a degree in Economics, Political Science and Public Administration in 1961 from the Gandhigram Rural Institute near Dindigul, he worked in Kerala as a statistical investigator for the Government of India's National Sample Survey Office in its early years.

In 1962, he left his job to study screenwriting and direction at the Film and Television Institute of India, Pune. He completed his course with a scholarship from the Government of India. With his classmates and friends, Gopalakrishnan established Chithralekha Film Society and Chalachithra Sahakarana Sangham; the organization was the first film society in Kerala and it aimed at production, distribution and exhibition of films in the co-operative sector.

== Film career ==
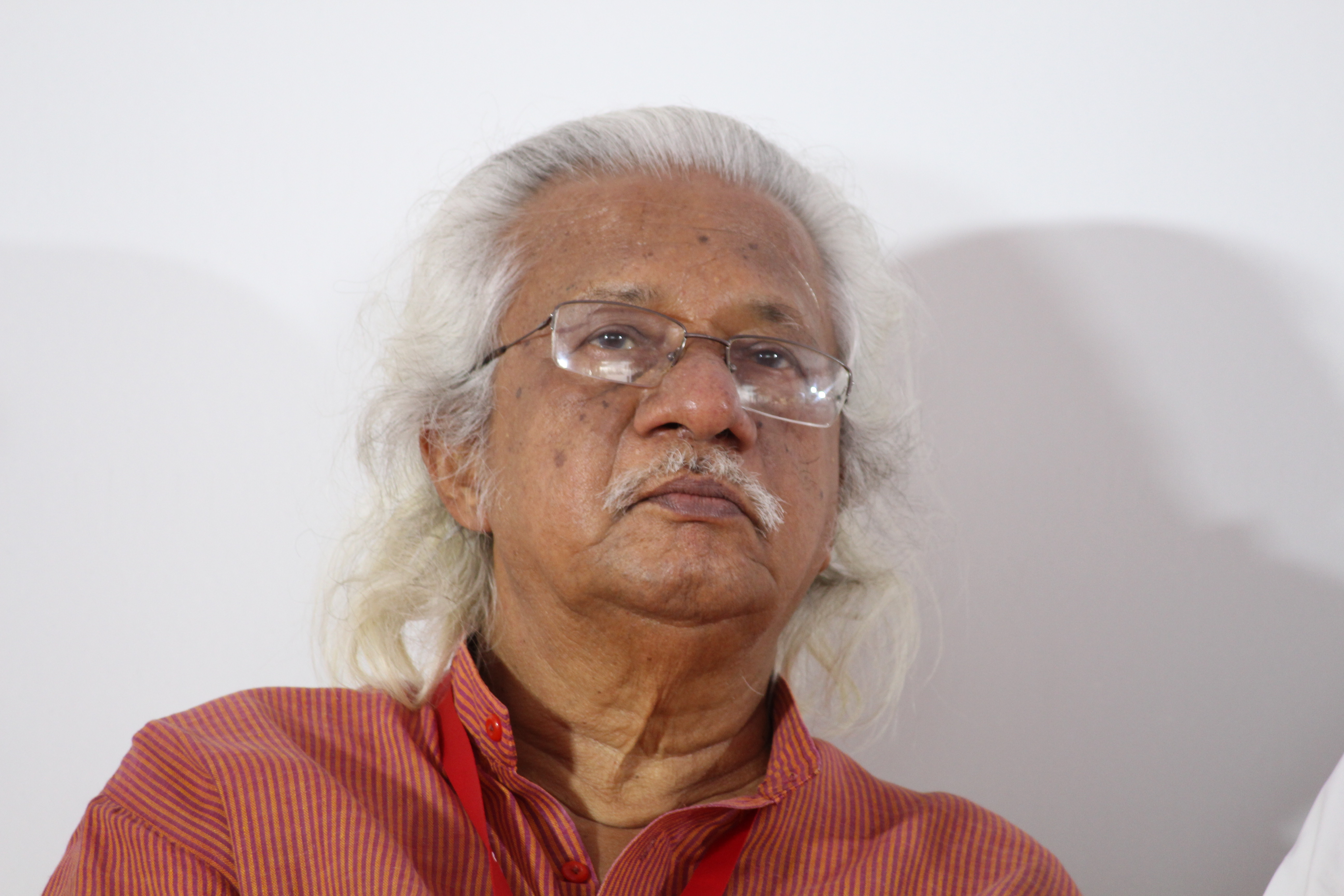
Gopalakrishnan at the International Film Festival of Kerala, 2016

Gopalakrishnan's debut film, the national award-winning Swayamvaram (1972) was a milestone in Malayalam film history. The film was exhibited widely in various international film festivals including those held in Moscow, Melbourne, London and Paris. The films that followed namely Kodiyettam, Elippathayam, Mukhamukham, Anantaram, Mathilukal, Vidheyan and Kathapurushan lived up to the reputation of his first film and were well received by critics at various film festivals and fetched him many awards. However, Mukhamukham was criticized in Kerala while Vidheyan was at the centre of a debate due to the differences in opinion between the writer of story of the film Sakhariya and Gopalakrishnan.

Gopalakrishnan's later films are Nizhalkuthu, narrating the experiences of an executioner who learns that one of his subjects was innocent, and Naalu Pennungal, a film adaptation of four short stories by Thakazhi Sivasankara Pillai.

All his films have won national and international awards (National award for best film twice, best director five times, and best script two times. His films have also won his actors and technicians several national awards). Gopalakrishnan's third feature, Elippathayam won him the coveted British Film Institute Award for 'the most original and imaginative film' of 1982. The International Film Critics Prize (FIPRESCI) has gone to him six times successively for Mukhamukham, Anantharam, Mathilukal, Vidheyan, Kathapurushan and Nizhalkkuthu. Winner of several international awards like the UNICEF film prize (Venice), OCIC film prize (Amiens), INTERFILM Prize (Mannheim) etc., his films have been shown in Cannes, Venice, Berlin, Toronto, London, Rotterdam and every important festival around the world.

In consideration of his contribution to Indian cinema, the nation honoured him with the title of Padma Shri (India's fourth highest civilian award) in 1984 and Padma Vibhushan (India's second highest civilian award) in 2006.

== Personal life ==
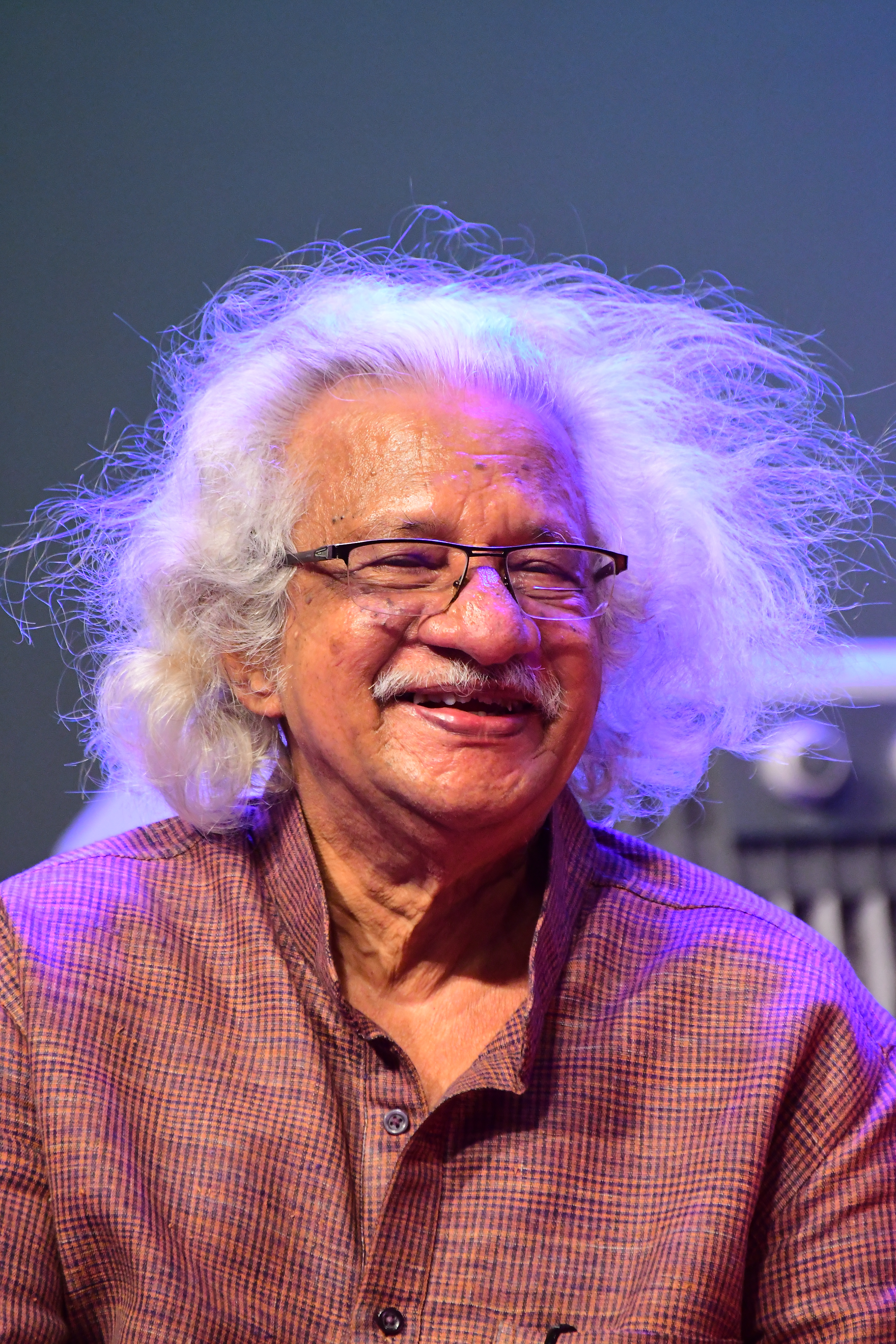
Gopalakrishnan in 2022

Gopalakrishnan is settled in Thiruvananthapuram in Kerala. His daughter Aswathi Dorje is an IPS officer (part of the Assam cadre, 2000 batch), currently acting as Deputy Commissioner of Police in Mumbai since June 2010.

His biography Face to Face: The Cinema of Adoor Gopalakrishnan (2016) has been written by film scholar Parthajit Baruah of Assam.

In December 2023, alongside 50 other filmmakers, Gopalakrishnan signed an open letter published in Libération demanding a ceasefire and an end to the 2023 Gaza war, and for a humanitarian corridor into Gaza to be established for humanitarian aid, and the release of hostages.

== Documentaries and 'New Cinema' movement ==
Apart from nine feature films, he has over 30 short films and documentaries to his credit. The Helsinki Film Festival was the first film festival to have a retrospective of his films. He has headed the jury at the National Film Awards and many international film festivals.

Apart from his films, Gopalakrishnan's major contribution towards introducing a new cinema culture in Kerala was the constitution of the first Film Society in Kerala, "Chitralekha Film Society". He also took active part in the constitution of "Chitralekha", Kerala's first Film Co-operative Society for film production. These movements triggered a fresh wave of films, called "art films", by directors like G Aravindan, PA Becker, KG George, Pavithran, and Raveendran. At a time this movement was so strong that even popular cinema synthesised with art cinema to create a new genre of films. Bharat Gopi starred as hero 4 times in his ventures.

== Style and trademarks ==
According to Gopalakrishnan "[i]n movies, the actor is not performing to the audience like the stage actor. Here they are acting for me. I am the audience and I will decide whether it is correct or not, enough or not."

== Controversies ==
In 2014, Gopalakrishnan, then heading the advisory committee of The International Film Festival of Kerala (IFFK), irked controversy for introducing measures such as delegate passes being given only to those who can speak English since foreign films come with English subtitles, these changes were criticized for promoting old-world elitism and restricting the festival's appeal.

In 2023, he faced criticism for defending the K. R. Narayanan National Institute of Visual Science and Arts director, Shankar Mohan, accused of violating reservation norms and discriminating based on caste and class. Gopalakrishan's statements, dismissing allegations and emphasizing Shankar Mohan's credentials, have drawn ire.

The students accused Gopalakrishnan, the chairman of the film institute, of shielding the institute director and not addressing their concerns.

== Awards and milestones ==
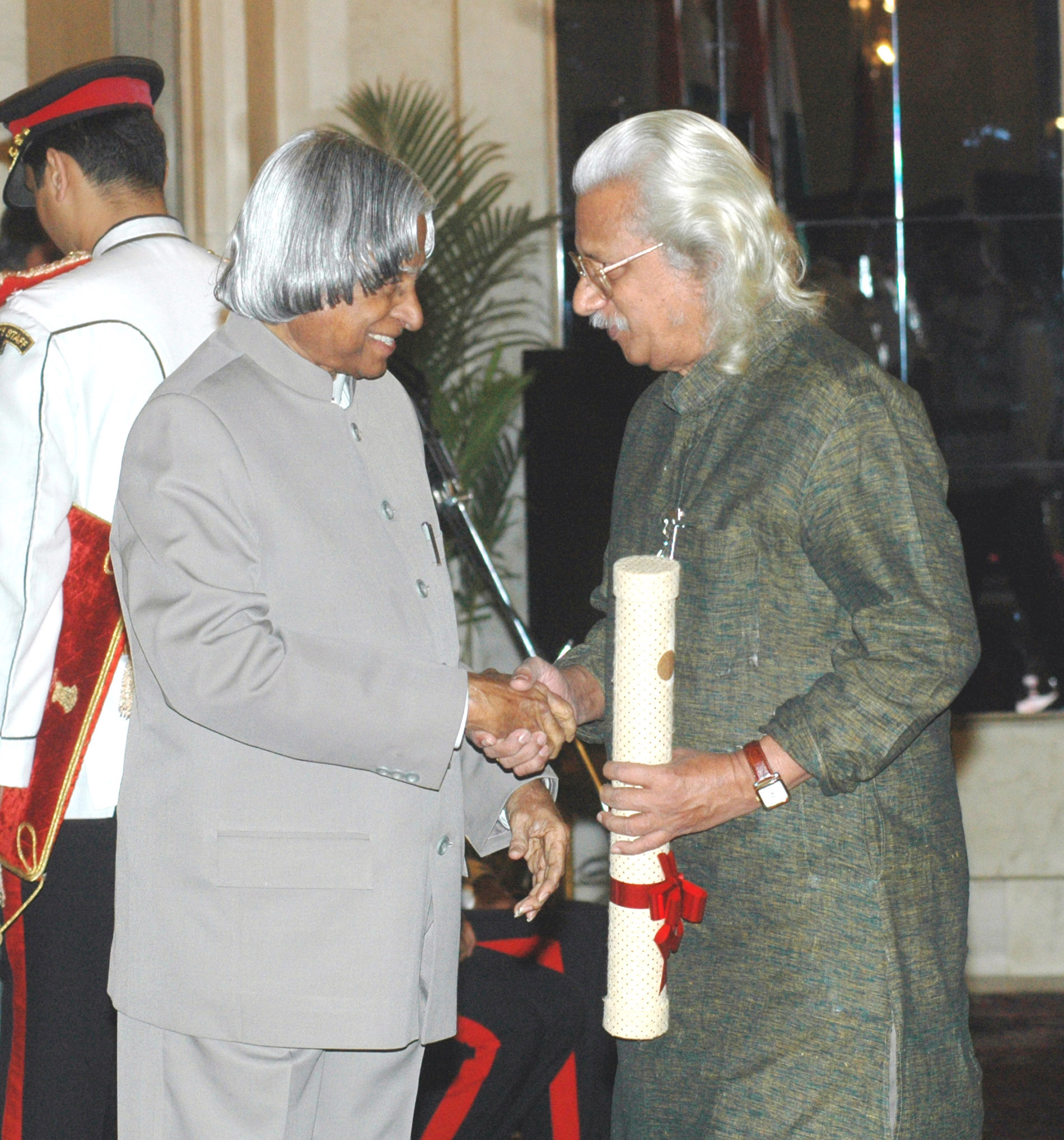
The President, Dr. A.P.J. Abdul Kalam presenting the Padma Vibhushan Award – 2006 to Shri Adoor Gopalakrishnan in New Delhi on March 20, 2006

Some of the awards and appreciation Gopalakrishnan has won for his films include:

- 2016 - On the occasion of India celebrating its 70th Independence day, news agency NDTV compiled a list called "70 Years, 70 Great Films" and Swayamvaram was among the four Malayalam films that found place in the list.
- 2015 - Biswaratna Dr Bhupen Hazarika International Solidarity Award
- 2013 - Kerala Sahitya Akademi Award C. B. Kumar Endowment for Cinema yum Samskaravum (Essay)
- 2010 - Honorary Doctorate (D.Litt) from University of Kerala
- 2006 - Padma Vibhushan — Second highest civilian award from Government of India
- 2004 - Dadasaheb Phalke Award — Lifetime Achievement Award in Film awarded by the Government of India
- 1996 - Honorary Doctorate (D.Litt) from Mahatma Gandhi University
- 1984 - Padma Shri — Fourth highest civilian award from Government of India.
- 1984 - Legion of Honour — French order, the highest decoration in France
- National Film Awards — Various categories for Swayamvaram, Kodiyettam, Elippathayam, Mukhamukham, Anantaram, Mathilukal, Vidheyan, Kathapurushan, Nizhalkkuthu and Naalu Pennungal
- Kerala State Film Awards: — Various categories for Kodiyettam, Elippathayam, Mukhamukham, Anantaram, Vidheyan and Oru Pennum Randaanum
- International Film Critics Prize (FIPRESCI) — won consecutively for six feature films (Mukhamukham, Anantaram, Mathilukal, Vidheyan, Kathapurushan and Nizhalkkuthu)
- London Film Festival — Sutherland Trophy — in 1982 for Elippathayam
- British Film Institute Award — Most Original Imaginative Film of 1982 — Elippathayam
- Commandeur of the Ordre des Arts et des Lettres by French Government (2003)
- Lifetime achievement award at Cairo International Film Festival.

National Film Awards (Detailed):

- 1973 - Best Film - Swayamvaram
- 1973 - Best Director - Swayamvaram
- 1978 - Best Feature Film in Malayalam - Kodiyettam
- 1980 - National Film Award – Special Jury Award / Special Mention (Non-Feature Film) - The Chola Heritage
- 1982 - Best Feature Film in Malayalam - Elippathayam
- 1984 - Best Book on Cinema - Cinemayude Lokam
- 1985 - Best Director - Mukhamukham
- 1985 - Best Feature Film in Malayalam - Mukhamukham
- 1985 - Best Screenplay - Mukhamukham
- 1988 - Best Director - Anantharam
- 1988 - Best Screenplay - Anantharam
- 1990 - Best Director - Mathilukal
- 1990 - Best Feature Film in Malayalam - Mathilukal
- 1994 - Best Feature Film in Malayalam - Vidheyan
- 1995 - Best Film - Kathapurushan
- 2003 - Best Feature Film in Malayalam - Nizhalkkuthu
- 2008 - Best Director - Naalu Pennungal

Kerala State Film Awards (Detailed):

Best Film

- 1977 - Best Film - Kodiyettam
- 1981 - Best Film - Elippathayam
- 1984 - Best Film - Mukhamukham
- 1993 - Best Film - Vidheyan
- 2008 - Best Film - Oru Pennum Randaanum

Best Director

- 1977 - Best Director - Kodiyettam
- 1984 - Best Director - Mukhamukham
- 1987 - Best Director - Anantharam
- 1993 - Best Director - Vidheyan
- 2008 - Best Director - Oru Pennum Randaanum

Best Story

- 1977 - Best Story - Kodiyettam

Best Screen Play

- 1993 - Best Screen Play - Vidheyan
- 2008 - Best Screen Play - Oru Pennum Randaanum

Best Documentary Film

- 1982 - Best Documentary Film - Krishnanattam
- 1999 - Best Documentary Film - Kalamandalam Gopi

Best Short Film

- 2005 - Best Short Film - Kalamandalam Ramankutty Nair

Best Book on Cinema

- 2004 - Best Book on Cinema - Cinemanubhavam

Kerala Film Critics Association Awards (Detailed):

- 1984 - Best Film - Mukhamukham
- 1987 - Best Director - Anantaram
- 1989 - Best Film - Mathilukal
- 1989 - Best Director - Mathilukal
- 1993 - Best Film - Vidheyan
- 1993 - Best Director - Vidheyan
- 1995 - Best Film - Kathapurushan
- 1995 - Best Director - Kathapurushan
- 2016 - Ruby Jubilee Award

A retrospective of his films was conducted in

- Kolkata, by Seagull Foundation for the Arts and Nandan, 2009.
- The Slovenian International Film Festival, 2009.
- The Munich Film Museum, 2009.
- The French Cinematheque, Paris, 1999.

== Filmography ==
Year	Title	Duration	Category	Awards
1965	A Great Day	20 mins	Short fiction	
1966	A Day at Kovalam	30 mins	Documentary	
1967	The Myth	50 Seconds	Short fiction	Merit Certificate, Expo 67, Montreal
1968	Danger at Your Door-step	20 mins	Documentary	
1968	And Man created	8 mins	Documentary	
1968	Manntharikal (Grains of Sand)	20 mins	Documentary	
1969	Towards National STD	20 mins	Documentary	
1969	A Mission of Love	30 mins	Documentary	
1966	Your Food	60 mins	Documentary	
1970	Pratisandhi (The Impasse)	55 mins	Docu-drama	
1971	Romance of Rubber	30 mins	Documentary	
1972	Swayamvaram (One's Own Choice)	125 mins	Feature film	National Awards for Best Film, Best Director, Best Actress and Best Cinematographer. Entered into the 8th Moscow International Film Festival.
1973	Kilimanooril Oru Dasalakshadhipati (A Millionaire in Kilimanoor	20 mins	Documentary	
1974	Guru Chengannur	17 mins	Documentary	
1975	Past in Perspective	20 mins	Documentary	
1976	Idukki	60 mins	Documentary	
1977	Kodiyettam (Ascent)	128 mins	Feature film	National Awards for Best Feature Film in Malayalam and Best Actor
1978	Four Shorts on Family Planning	16 mins	Documentary	
1979	Yakshagana	20 mins	Documentary	
1980	Chola Heritage	20 mins	Documentary	
1981	Elippathayam (The Rat Trap)	121 mins	Feature film	Sutherland Trophy at 1982 London Film Festival; National Awards for Best Feature Film in Malayalam and Best Audiography
1982	Krishnanattam	20 mins	Documentary	
1984	Mukhamukham (Face to Face)	107 mins	Feature film	FIPRESCI Prize, New Delhi, National Awards for Best Director, Best Screenplay and Best Audiography
1985	Eau/Ganga (Ganges-Water)	140 mins	Documentary	Grand Prize, Cinema du reel, Paris
1987	Anantaram (Monologue)	125 mins	Feature film	FIPRESCI Prize, Karlovy Vary. National awards for best director, best screenplay, and best audiography
1990	Mathilukal (The Walls)	117 mins	Feature film	FIPRESCI prize, Venice, UNICEF Film Prize, Venice, OCIC Prize, Amiens. National Award for best director, best actor, best regional film and best audiography
1993	Vidheyan (The Servile)	112 mins	Feature film	Feature FIPRESCI and Special Jury Prize, Singapore. Interfilm Jury Prize, Mannheim. Netpac prize, Rotterdam. National Award for best actor and best regional film
1995	Kathapurushan (The Man of the Story)	107 mins	Feature film	FIPRESCI Prize, National award for the best film
1995	Kalamandalam Gopi	43 mins	Documentary	
2001	Koodiyattam	180 mins	Documentary	
2002	Nizhalkuthu	90 mins	Feature film	FIPRESCI, Mumbai. National award for best regional film
2005	Kalamandalam Ramankutty Nair	73 mins	Documentary	
2007	Dance of the Enchantress	72 mins	Documentary	
2007	Naalu Pennungal (Four Women)	105 mins	Feature film	National Award for best director
2008	Oru Pennum Randaanum (A Climate for Crime)	115 mins	Feature film	Kerala State award for best director 2009
2016	Pinneyum (Once Again)		Feature film	
2019	Sukhantyam (A Happy End)		Short fiction	
Upcoming	Padayaatra		Feature film	

== Trivia ==
Kaamuki (Lover) is an incomplete 1967 movie directed by Adoor Gopalakrishnan and starring Madhu, Ushanandini, and Adoor Bhasi. The movie, produced by a friend from Kuwait, was dropped midway due to financial problems. The screenplay of the movie was later adapted, with some changes, as Theerangal (1978) by Rajeev Nath. Two of the four songs rendered by Yesudas in the original movie were also included in Theerangal (1978). The lyrics were by Ettumaanoor Somadasan, and the music was composed by the team of V.K. Sasidharan and P.K. Sivadas.

== See also ==
- Malayalam cinema
- List of Malayalam films of the 1990s
