= K. G. Jayan (cinematographer) =

Indian cinematographer

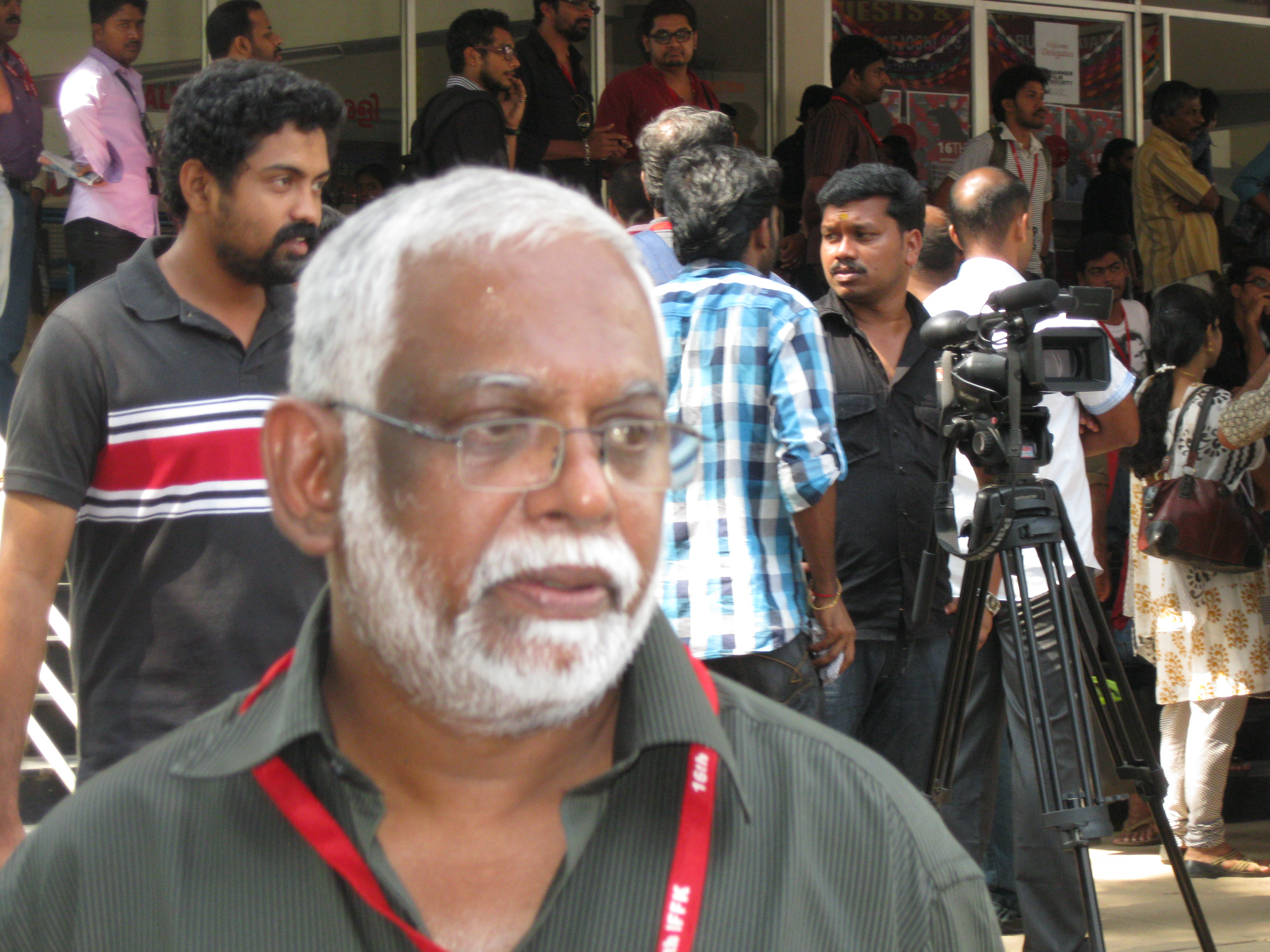
- Born: Kodapully Gangadharan Jayan; Thiruvananthapuram, Kerala, India
- Education: FTII
- Occupations: Cinematographer; dean

Kodapully Gangadharan Jayan is an Indian cinematographer who works predominantly in Malayalam cinema. He has won a National Film Award, two Kerala State Film Awards, a Kerala Film Critics Award and a Kerala State Television Award. He is a member of Indian Society of Cinematographers (ISC).

== Early life ==
Jayan was born and brought up in Thiruvananthapuram, Kerala. His father Gangadharan was a radiologist. His uncle Velappan Alappad was a renowned film critic. He did his schooling from Government Model Boys Higher Secondary School. He pursued his bachelor's degree and master's degree from Mar Ivanios College and Government Arts College, Thiruvananthapuram. Jayan went to Film and Television Institute of India for pursuing diploma in cinematography, in where Santosh Sivan was his classmate and Venu was his senior.

== Career ==
Jayan began his career in Malayalam cinema with Harikumar's Jaalakam after taking over from Venu, who had to withdraw from the shoot after a couple of days. He continues to work in parallel cinema with directors like T. V. Chandran and Priyanandanan.

Jayan has shot over 1000 documentaries. His work in K. R. Mohanan's documentary Oru Vanavyavasthayude Sheshippukal won him the Kerala State Television Award for Best Videography, the first ever for a documentary in Kerala, and The 18th Elephant, in which he worked with P. Balan, won him the National Film Award for Best Cinematography in non-feature film section. He has also shot 197 episodes for Asianet's landmark travelogue Ente Keralam.

Jayan also worked as a deputy director at the Centre for Development of Imaging Technology from 1990 to 2014. He is currently working as the head of department of cinematography at L. V. Prasad College of Media Studies, Thiruvananthapuram.

In 2016, he made his directorial debut with the short film Chennikuthu.

== Selected filmography ==
=== Films ===
Year	Film	Director	Ref(s)
1987	Jaalakam	Harikumar	
1988	Rugmini	K. P. Kumaran	
1989	Jaathakam	Suresh Unnithan	
1990	Marupuram	Viji Thampi	
1999	Saree	Suma Josson	
2000	Susanna	T. V. Chandran	
2000	Kattu Vannu Vilichappol	Sashi Paravoor	
2001	Pularvettam	Harikumar	
2001	Dany	T. V. Chandran	
2003	Paadam Onnu: Oru Vilapam	T. V. Chandran	
2004	Pravasam	Kalidas Puthumana	
2004	Kathavaseshan	T. V. Chandran	
2004	Chithariyavar	Lalji George	
2006	Pulijanmam	Priyanandanan	
2006	Nottam	Sashi Paravoor	
2006	Drishtantham	M. P. Sukumaran Nair	
2007	Paradeshi	P. T. Kunju Muhammed	
2009	Raamanam	M. P. Sukumaran Nair	
2009	Boomi Malayalam	T. V. Chandran	
2010	Sufi Paranja Katha	Priyanandanan	
2012	Ithramathram	K. Gopinathan	
2014	Nayana	K. N. Sasidharan	
2014	Chayilyam	Manoj Kana	
2014	Jalamsham	M. P. Sukumaran Nair	
2015	Vidooshakan	T. K. Santhosh	
2016	Amoeba	Manoj Kana	
2017	Crossroad - Lake House	Sashi Paravoor	
2022	Gramavrikshathile Kuyil	K. P. Kumaran	

=== Documentaries ===
Year	Film	Director	Ref(s)
1994	Oru Vanavyavasthayude Sheshippukal	K. R. Mohanan	
2003	The 18th Elephant: Three Monologues	P. Balan	
2013	In Search of our Lost Rice Seeds	Suma Josson	
2016	In Return: Just a Book	Shiny Benjamin	
2020	Maythil	K. Gopinathan	

=== Short films ===
Year	Film	Director	Ref(s)
2016	Chennikuthu	Himself	

== Accolades ==
Year	Award	Category	Work	Ref(s)
1994	Kerala State Television Awards	Best Videography	Vanavyavasthayude Sheshippukal	
2000	Kerala Film Critics Association Awards	Best Cinematographer	Susanna, Kattu Vannu Vilichappol	
2001	Kerala State Film Awards	Best Cinematography	Dany	
2003	National Film Awards	Best Cinematography (non-feature film)	The 18th Elephant: Three Monologues	
2009	Kerala State Film Awards	Best Cinematography	Sufi Paranja Katha	
