= B. Ajithkumar =

Indian film editor and director

- Born: Kothamangalam, Kerala, India
- Education: Film and Television Institute of India, Pune
- Occupations: Film editor; director
- Years active: 1998–present
- Awards: National Film Award for Best Editing (2007)

B. Ajithkumar (also known B. Ajith Kumar) is an Indian film editor and director. He has won the National Award for Best Editing in 2007 for Naalu Pennungal as well as the Kerala State Film Award for Best Editor in 2002 (for Nizhalkuthu and Bhavam), 2013 for Annayum Rasoolum, and 2017 (for Kammatipaadam). Ajithkumar graduated from Film and Television Institute of India, Pune. After graduating, he started his career as film editor. His debut directorial film was Eeda, which depicts the violent political atmosphere of Kannur.

== Filmography ==
=== Feature films ===
Year	Title	Director
2025	Ouseppinte Osyath	R. J. Sarath Chandran
2021	Kuttavum Shikshayum	Rajeev Ravi
2021	Thuramukham	Rajeev Ravi
2019	Kadaisi Vivasayi	M. Manikandan
2018	Thurthu Nirgamana	Hemanth Kumar L
2018	Moothon	Geetu Mohandas
2018	Eeda	Himself
2017	Padmini	Susmesh Chandroth
2017	Ayaal Jeevichirippund	Vyasan K.P.
2017	Pinneyum	Adoor Gopalakrishnan
2017	Samarpanam	K. Gopinathan
2016	Kismath	Shanavas K Bavakutty
2016	Kammatipaadam	Rajeev Ravi
2014	Ottaal	Jayaraj
2014	Alif	Muhamed Koya
2014	D Company	Vinod Vijayan
2014	Jalamsham	MP Sukumaran Nair
2014	Vasanthathinte Kanal Vazhikalil	Anil Nagendran
2014	Njan Steve Lopez	Rajeev Ravi
2013	Liar's Dice	Geethu Mohandas
2013	Annayum Rasoolum	Rajeev Ravi
2013	Ithramathram	K Gopinathan
2013	Up & Down: Mukalil Oralundu	T. K. Rajeev Kumar
2012	I.D.	Kamal KM
2012	Parudeesa	R. Sarath
2012	Orange	Biju Varkey
2012	Thalsamayam Oru Penkutty	T. K. Rajeev Kumar
2012	Chattakkari	Santhosh Sethumadhavan
2011	Kanmazha Peyyum Munpe	Roy
2011	Rathinirvedam	T. K. Rajeev Kumar
2010	Kushti	T. K. Rajeev Kumar
2010	Oru Naal Varum	T. K. Rajeev Kumar
2010	Sadgamaya	Harikumar
2008	Aakasha Gopuram	K. P. Kumaran
2008	Chandranilekkoru Vazhi	Biju Varkey
2008	Oru Pennum Randaanum	Adoor Gopalakrishnan
2008	Ramanam	MP Sukumaran Nair
2008	Ssh..Silence Please	K. P. Sasi
2008	Bhavam	Satheesh Menon
2007	Naalu Pennungal	Adoor Gopalakrishnan
2007	Paranjutheeratha Viseshangal	Harikumar
2007	Rathrimazha	Lenin Rajendran
2006	Drishtantham	MP Sukumaran Nair
2006	November Rain	Vinu Joseph
2005	Free Kick	T. K. Rajeev Kumar
2004	The Journey	Ligy J. Pullappally
2004	Yaanam	Sanjay Nambiar
2004	Chayam	Biju C. Kannan
2004	Pravaasam	Kalidas Puthumana
2003	Anyar	Lenin Rajendran
2003	Ek Alag Mausam	K. P. Sasi
2003	Uthara	Sanil Kalathil
2002	Nizhalkuthu	Adoor Gopalakrishnan
2001	Thotram	K. P. Kumaran
2000	Indriyam	George Kithu
2000	Mankolangal	Subrahmanian Santakumar
2000	Mazha	Lenin Rajendran
2000	Mazhanoolkkanav	Nandakumar Kavil
2000	Pilots	Rajiv Anchal
2000	Sayahnnam	MP Sukumaran Nair
1999	Angane Oravadhikkalath	Mohan
1999	Maanthrika Veena	Nandakumar Kavil

=== Documentaries ===
Year	Title	Director
2017	8½ Intercuts: Life and Films of K.G. George	Lijin Jose
2017	Amma	Neelan
2014	In Return: Just a Book	Shiny Benjamin
2013	Translated Lives - A Migration Revisited	Shiny Benjamin
2013	Algorithms	Ian McDonald
2012	Fabricated	K. P. Sasi
2012	Matathinte Pattukari	Sajitha Madathil
2010	Yours truly John	C Saratchandran
2010	Arogyanikethanam - 6 episodes	P Baburaj & B Ajithkumar
2010	Coming spring	C Saratchandarn & P Baburaj
2009	Njangalundu Koode	T. K. Rajeev Kumar
2008	Koorumala	B Ajithkumar
2008	Mohiniyattam	Sajeev Pillai
2007	Dance of the Enchantress	Adoor Gopalakrishnan
2007	Inside the Kalari	Ian McDonald
2007	Kalarippayatt	Sajeev Pillai
2007	Palathully	T. K. Rajeev Kumar
2006	Gadi Lohardaga Mail	Meghnath & Biju Toppo
2006	Kora Rajee	Meghnath & Biju Toppo
2006	Thousand days and a Dream	C Saratchandran & P Baburaj
2005	Blue Sun, Green Moon (Documentary on Ayyappa Paniker)	Rajagopal Kombiyil
2005	Bhopal: The Survivors' Story	Rumah Rasaque
2005	Candles in the wind	P Baburaj
2005	Kalamandalam Ramankutty Nair	Adoor Gopalakrishnan
2005	Metamorphosis	
2005	Only an Axe Away	C Saratchandran & P Baburaj
2005	Twice evicted	Gopal Menon
2004	Above the din of sewing machinesd	Surabhi Sharma
2004	Long Sails	Sajiv Pillai
2004	Age of explorations	Premraj Achari & B Ajithkumar
2004	Snehayaanam	Mustafa Desamangalam
2003	Emergence of Man	
2003	Godhra Tak - the terror trail	Shubhradeep Chakraborty
2003	Kannur- The triumph of will	Rajiv Raj
2003	Naga Story	Gopal Menon
2002	Resilient Rhythms	Gopal Menon
2001	Ancient Mathematics	James Joseph
2000	Keraleeyam	Babu Bharadwaj
