= Chandran Veyattummal =

Indian musical artist (1956–2022)

Chandran Veyattummal ചന്ദ്രൻ വെയാട്ടുമ്മൽ
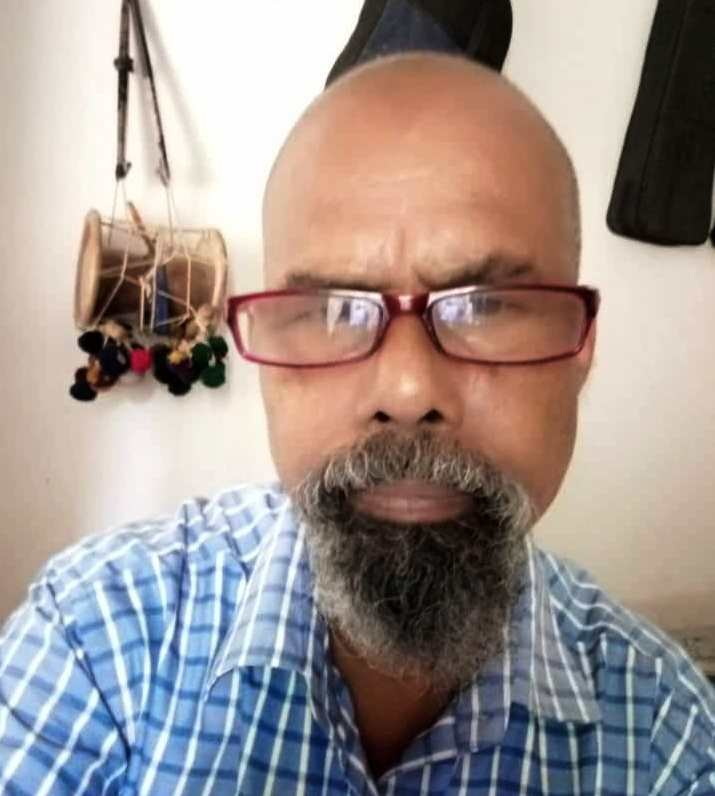
- Chandran Veyattummal / Paris Chandran

Background information
- Born: Chandran Veyattummal; 30 April 1956; Kozhikode, Kerala
- Died: 22 May 2022 (aged 66) Kozhikode, Kerala
- Genres: Film Score, World Music, Electronic
- Occupations: Music Composer, Multi Instrumentalist, Music Arranger, Mixing Engineer
- Instruments: Sitar, Piano, Cello, Flute, Jhempe, Derbuka, Idakka, Tabla, Dholak, African Shakers, Saxophone, Esraj, Keyboard, Synthesizer, Seaboard, Carnatic & Sopanam Vocal

Chandran Veyattummal (also known as Paris Chandran/ Paris V Chandran; 30 April 1956 – 22 May 2022) was born in a traditional musical family in Narikkuni, Kozhikode district of Kerala.

Chandran started learning music at the age of six under parents first and then under renowned gurus like Venu Nanminda and Ustad Ahemmed Hussain Khan. Adept at percussion, string instruments, wind instruments, keyboard and reed instruments, he became a music composer. Since 1982, he has been giving background scores for theatrical productions, films and documentaries. He has won Kerala State Film Awards for best background score for the film Bioscope in 2008. He was a disciple of Njaralath Rama Pothuval, Theyyanasan, Kunnamkulam Kelu Asaan.

== As musician ==
Year	Title	Film	Language	Singer	Credit
2007	Chenthaasaayakaa	Drishtantham	Malayalam	Margi Sathi	Composer
2007	Devi	Drishtantham	Malayalam	Pathanapuram Jose	Composer
2007	Enthaanu Vallabhaa	Drishtantham	Malayalam	Margi Sathi	Composer
2007	Mudiyettam (Daarikavadham)	Drishtantham	Malayalam	Pathanapuram Jose	Composer
2007	Nalla samayamithu	Drishtantham	Malayalam	Margi Sathi	Composer
2007	Onnukandotte	Drishtantham	Malayalam	KV Selin	Composer
2007	Paayeedum Thampuraane	Drishtantham	Malayalam	Sreenivasan Veyattummal	Composer
2007	Rosham Undaakkuvan	Drishtantham	Malayalam	Margi Sathi	Composer
2007	Varanund Varanund	Drishtantham	Malayalam	Sreenivasan Veyattummal	Composer
2010	Meera	Bombay Mittayi	Malayalam	G. Venugopal	Composer
2010	Himagiri	Bombay Mittayi	Malayalam	K. J. Yesudas & Jos Sagar	Composer
2010	Mannum Ponnayi	Bombay Mittayi	Malayalam	Midhu Vincent, Vidhu Prathap, Ravisankar, Geetha Jith	Composer
2010	Meerathan	Bombay Mittayi	Malayalam	K. S. Chithra	Composer
2010	Kochukuttiyepole	Bombay Mittayi	Malayalam	Pradeep Palluruthy	Composer
2011	Sarika	Nakharam	Malayalam	Traditional	Composer
2011	Rama Rama	Nakharam	Malayalam	Traditional	Composer
2011	Melukovayya	Nakharam	Malayalam	Traditional	Composer
2014	Ambilippoovukal	Chayilyam	Malayalam	Sithara (singer), Nakhasi Shivadas	Composer
2013	Kannottam Ennum	Bioscope	Malayalam	Anil Ram	Composer
2013	Mannuyirellam	Bioscope	Malayalam	Anil Ram	Composer
2014	Pokaruthen Makane	Njan Steve Lopez	Malayalam	Jency	Composer
2016	Chillu Chillu Chillakal	Amoeba	Malayalam	Haritha Hareesh	Composer
2017	Maarivil Maayanu	Eeda	Malayalam	Sithara (singer)	Composer
2022	(BGM)	Antharam	Malayalam	--	Background Score

== In Theatre ==
- 2009 – Palangal
- 2016 – Talatum tempest
- 2016 – Ekantham
- 2019 – Dark things

== Awards ==
- Kerala State Film Awards for best background score for the film Bioscope
