= Indian cinematographers =

Indian cinematographers work in a number of regional film centres: Mumbai for films in Marathi and Hindi, Hyderabad for Telugu films, Chennai for Tamil films, Kochi for films in Malayalam, Kolkata for Bengali films, Bangalore for Kannada films, etc. Most Indian cinematographers are known for their work with one regional industry. Some cinematographers belong to various professional organisations and trade unions.

== Western India Cinematographers' Association (WICA) ==
The Western India Cinematographers Association (WICA) is a society for Indian cinematographers. The society's office is situated at Mumbai in Maharashtra. Members of this society include the suffix WICA after their name in film credits. The organisation was formed on 2 August 1953 in Mumbai, and was presided over by a leading cinematographer of the time, Faredoon Irani; in the following month, the first office-bearers were chosen, including Nitin Bose as President and V. Avadhut as Vice-President. According to WICA, it has 3,800 members.

== Southern India Cinematographers Association (SICA) ==
The Southern India Cinematographers Association (SICA), a trade union, was founded on 27 November 1972 by A. Vincent.

== The Indian Society of Cinematographers ==
The Indian Society of Cinematographers (ISC) is an educational, cultural, and professional organization founded in 1995. Neither a labour union nor a guild, ISC membership is by invitation and is extended only to directors of photography and special effects experts with distinguished credits in the film industry. The society is situated at Thiruvananthapuram in Kerala. The members of this society will show a suffix, ISC with their name in film credits. Sunny Joseph is the current president of the ISC.

=== Founding members ===
- Anil Mehta
- Ramachandra Babu
- Sunny Joseph
- P. C. Sreeram
- Santosh Sivan
- K. V. Anand
- Venu
- Ravi K. Chandran
- Madhu Ambat
- P. Sukumar

=== Members of ISC ===
- Anay Goswami
- Anil Mehta
- Amal Neerad
- Alagappan N.
- Aseem Mishra
- C. K. Muraleedharan
- Chezhiyan
- Chota K. Naidu
- Fowzia Fathima
- Girish Gangadharan
- Hari Nair
- Jay Pinak Oza
- Jomon T. John
- K. V. Anand
- K. G. Jayan
- K. U. Mohanan
- Madhu Ambat
- Madhu Neelakandan
- Natty Subramaniam
- Preetha Jayaraman
- P. C. Sreeram
- P. S. Vinod
- R. Madhi
- Rajeev Ravi
- Ramachandra Babu
- Ravi K. Chandran
- Ravi Varman
- Sameer Thahir
- Santosh Sivan
- Sathyan Sooryan
- Shaji N. Karun
- Sanu Varghese
- Shyju Khalid
- Sunny Joseph
- Supratim Bhol
- Sylvester Fonseca
- Venu
- Velraj
- S. R. Kathir
- Sujith Vassudev
- Tushar Kanti Ray

== List of Indian cinematographers ==
A

- Abinandhan Ramanujam
- Arjun Jena
- A. Vincent
- A. Vinod Bharathi
- A. Vasanth
- Abinandhan Ramanujam
- Aditya Vikram Sengupta
- Adurthi Subba Rao (1912–1975)
- Adwaith Shine
- Ajayan Vincent
- Akhil George
- Alagappan N.
- Amal Neerad
- Amar Mitra Peddireddy
- Amalendu Chaudhary
- Amit Roy
- Amitabha Singh
- Amol Gole
- Amol Rathod
- Anandakuttan (1954 – 2016)
- Anay Goswamy
- Anil Mehta
- Anji
- Anjuli Shukla
- Ansar Shah
- Apurba Kishore Bir
- Aravinnd Singh
- Arbhindu Saaraa
- Arjun Jena
- Arthur A. Wilson
- Arvind S Kashyap
- Arvind Krishna
- Aseem Mishra
- Ashok Kumar
- Ashok Mehta (1947- 2012)
- Appu Prabhakar
- Attar Singh Saini
- Avik Mukhopadhyay
- Avinash Arun
- Ayananka Bose

B

- B. Kannan (1951–2020)
- B. C. Gowrishankar
- B. S. Lokanath (1937 – 2011)
- B. R. Vijayalakshmi
- Baba Azmi
- Balu Mahendra
- Balasubramaniem
- Barun Mukherjee
- Biju Viswanath
- Binod Pradhan
- Bhuvan Gowda
- Bobby Singh (1974 - 2012)

C

- C. Rajendra Prasad
- C. K. Muraleedharan
- C. Prem Kumar
- Chandru Selvaraj
- Chirantan Das
- Chezhiyan
- Chota K. Naidu
- Crossbelt Mani

D

- Debalina Majumder
- Debu Deodhar (1948–2010)
- Deep Pal (1953 – 2021)
- Deepak Haldankar (born 1947)
- Dev Agarwal
- Dilip Dutta
- Dinesh Baboo
- Dwarka Divecha

E

- Eswaran Thangavel

F

- Fali Mistry (1919–1979)
- Faredoon Irani (1923 - 2000)
- Fowzia Fathima

G

- G. K. Vishnu
- G. S. Bhaskar
- Gavemic U. Ary
- Goutam Ghose
- George C. Williams
- Girish Gangadharan
- Gnana Shekar V. S.
- Gopi Bhagat
- Govind Nihalani

H

- H. C. Venugopal
- Hari Anumolu
- Hari Nair
- Hemant Chaturvedi

I

- Ishan Arya
- Ishaan Ghose

J

- J. Williams
- Jal Mistry (1923–2000)
- Jaya Krishna Gummadi
- Jay Oza
- Jayanan Vincent
- Jayesh Nair
- Jacob Verghese
- Jeeva (1963–2007)
- Jehangir Choudhary
- Jibu Jacob
- Jimshi Khalid
- Johny Lal
- Jomon T. John

K

- K. Vaikunth (1925 – 2003)
- K V Anand (1966–2021)
- K. U. Mohanan
- K. G. Jayan
- K. K. Mahajan (1944 – 2007)
- K.K. Senthil Kumar
- K. S. Prasad
- K. S. Prakash Rao (1914–1996)
- K. P. Nambiathiri
- K. V. Guhan
- Kabir Lal
- Kamal Bose (1915–1995)
- Kamal Ghosh
- Karan B. Rawat
- Karm Chawla (born 1985)
- Karthik Gattamneni
- Karthik Palani
- Kartik Vijay
- Kutub Inamdar

L

- Laxman Utekar
- Loganathan Srinivasan
- Lok Singh

M

- M. Sukumar
- M. S. Prabhu
- MN Malhotra
- M. J. Radhakrishnan (1958–2019)
- Madhu Ambat
- Madhu Neelakandan
- Mahesh Aney
- Mahesh Limaye
- Mahesh Muthuswami
- Manesh Madhavan
- Mankada Ravi Varma (1926 – 2010)
- Manmohan Singh
- Manoj Kumar Khatoi
- Manoj Paramahamsa
- Manush Nandan
- Mazhar Kamran
- Marcus Bartley
- Melli Irani
- Midhun Eravil
- Modhura Palit
- Mrinal Kanti Das
- Murali G.

N

- N. K. Ekambaram
- Nagendra Kumar Mothukuri
- Nagesh Banell
- Nando Bhattacharya
- Nariman Irani
- Natty Subramaniam
- Nemai Ghosh
- Navroze Contractor (1944–2023)
- Niketh Bommireddy
- Nikhil S. Praveen
- Nimish Ravi
- Nirav Shah
- Nirmal Jani
- Nitin Bose (1897 – 1986)
- Nizar Shafi
- Noushad Shereef

O

- Om Prakash

P

- Pappu
- P. S. Nivas
- P. C. Sreeram
- P.G. Vinda
- P. S. Vinod
- P. N. Sundaram
- Padmesh
- Pankaj Kumar
- Piyush Shah
- Prakash Velayudhan
- Prasad Murella
- Pratap P Nair
- Prathap Joseph
- Pratheek Shetty
- Pravin Bhatt
- Prayag Mukundan
- Preetha Jayaraman
- Prem Sagar
- Premendu Bikash Chaki
- Priya Seth

R

- R. Chittibabu
- R. D. Rajasekhar
- R. Rathnavelu
- R. Madhi
- R. Velappan Nair
- R. N. K. Prasad
- Radhu Karmakar (1919 - 1993)
- Raj Thota
- Rajeev Ravi
- Rajesh Yadav
- Rajiv Menon
- Ram Chandra
- Ramachandra Babu
- Ramananda Sengupta
- Ramji
- Ranjan Palit
- Rasool Ellore
- Ravi K. Chandran
- Ravi Varman
- Ravi Yadav
- Renadive
- Roby Varghese Raj

S

- S. D. Vijay Milton
- S. Kumar
- S. Ravi Varman
- S. R. Kathir
- S. Krishna
- S. Ramachandra (1948 – 2011)
- S. R. Sathish Kumar
- S. Gopal Reddy
- S. Saravanan
- Saket Saurabh
- Saloo George
- Samalabhasker
- Sameer Reddy
- Sameer Thahir
- Sanjay Jadhav
- Santhana Krishnan Ravichandran
- Sanu Varghese
- Santosh Sivan
- Sarvesh Murari
- Santosh Thundiyil
- Satchith Paulose
- Sathyan Sooryan
- Satish Motling
- Satheesh Kurup
- Satya Hegde
- Puttanna Kanagal
- Savita Singh
- Sejal Shah
- Sekhar V. Joseph
- Sethu Sriram
- Shaji Kumar
- Shaji N. Karun
- Sakthi Saravanan
- Shamdat
- Shaman Mithru
- Shehnad Jalal
- Shivtar Shiv
- Shreesha Kuduvalli
- Shyam K. Naidu
- Shyam Palav
- Shyju Khalid
- Siddhartha Nuni
- Sirsha Ray
- Sivan (1932 – 2021)
- Sivakumar Vijayan
- Soundararajan
- Soumendu Roy (1932 – 2023)
- Subrata Mitra (1930 – 2001)
- Sudeep Chatterjee
- Sudeep Elamon
- Supratim Bhol
- Sudhakar Reddy Yakkanti
- Sujith Sarang
- Sujith Vaassudev
- Sundarnath Suvarna
- Sunny Joseph
- Suryakant Lavande
- Sushil Rajpal
- Swaroop Philip

T

- Tassaduq Hussain Mufti
- Teja
- Thankar Bachan
- Theni Eswar
- Tirru
- Tulsi Ghimire

U

- U. K. Senthil Kumar
- Utpal V Nayanar

V

- V. A. Dilshad
- V. N. Reddy (1914–1991)
- V. Gopi Krishna
- V. Manikandan
- V. K. Murthy (1923 – 2014)
- V. S. R. Swamy
- Venu
- Vetri
- Velraj
- A. Vasanth
- Venkatesh Anguraj
- Venugopal Madathil
- Vidhu Ayyanna
- Vijay Milton
- Vijay C Chakravarthy
- Vijay C. Kumar
- Vikash Nowlakha
- Virendra Saini
- Vishal Sinha
- Vishnu Nandan
- Vishnu Rao
- Vipindas
- Vipin Mohan
- Vipin Vijay

== Awards ==
- Filmfare Award for Best Cinematographer
- Filmfare Best Cinematographer Award (South)
- SIIMA Award for Best Cinematographer (Telugu)
- IIFA Award for Best Cinematography
- Nandi Award for Best Cinematographer
- Kerala State Film Award for Best Photography
- National Film Award for Best Cinematography
- National Film Award for Best Non-Feature Film Cinematography
- Star Screen Awards
- Tamil Nadu State Film Award for Best Cinematographer

== See also ==
- Cinema of India
- Cinema of South India
- Indian film directors
