= Raamanam =

- Directed by: M. P. Sukumaran Nair
- Based on: Smarakasilakal by Punathil Kunhabdulla
- Produced by: M. P. Sukumaran Nair
- Starring: Jagathy Sreekumar; Indrans; Mamukkoya; Manju Pillai
- Music by: K. G. Jayan
- Release date: 29 October 2009
- Country: India
- Language: Malayalam

Raamanam (transl. Night Sky) is a 2009 Malayalam film directed and produced by M. P. Sukumaran Nair. Jagathy Sreekumar plays the lead character in this film. The film is a re-depiction of Smarakasilakal (Memorial Stones), a celebrated Malayalam novel by Punathil Kunhabdulla.

== Plot ==
A progressive thinking man, Pookoya Thangal (Jagathy Sreekumar) does not believe in the caste system or creed. One day a woman named Neeli was ostracized from the Hindu society because she became pregnant before marriage. Pookoya Thangal gave her a place to stay in his servant's house. Thangal's wife, Aatta Beevi (Margi Sati), was also pregnant.

Neeli died during childbirth of a baby boy. Aatta Beevi gave birth to a baby girl. Neeli's son was named Kunhali and Thangal's daughter's name was Pookkunhi Beevi. Kunhali stayed in Thangal's house. Thangal's wife hated the presence of Kunhali and he was sent to Pathu's house where he was raised up by Pathu.

Both Kunhali and Pookkunhi reached in the stage of higher studies. Kunhali joined for M.B.B.S and Pookkunni Beevi for Degree. At this time Thangal made his daughter to learn Nangyar Koothu, a Hindu ritual art form. After she learned Koothu, a performance was organised in a temple. Some members of the Hindu community did not tolerate the act and opposed.

The film also mentions the split within Muslim League, followed by two other incidents, namely the Emergency and the Babri Masjid incident.

== Cast ==
- Jagathy Sreekumar as Pookkoya Thangal
- Indrans as Eramullaan
- Manju Pillai
- Mamukkoya
- Anoop Chandran as Adruman
- Margi Sathi as Aatta Beevi
- Jayakrishnan as Kunhali
- Revathi Menon as Pookkunhi Beevi

== Awards ==
- Kerala State Film Award for Second Best Film
- Kerala State Film Award (Special Jury Award) – Jagathy Sreekumar
- John Abraham Award for Best Malayalam Film
