= Haldankar =

Haldankar is a surname. Notable people with the surname include:

- Babanrao Haldankar (1927–2016), Indian singer
- Deepak Haldankar (born 1947), Indian film director
- Narahari Haldankar, Indian politician
- Sawlaram Haldankar (1882–1968), Indian painter
- Suresh Haldankar, Indian classical singer
