= C. Saratchandran =

Indian documentary filmmaker

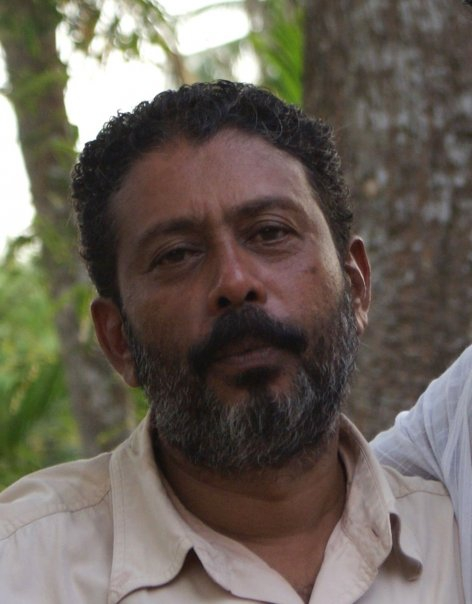
- Born: 16 February 1958; Thiruvananthapuram, Kerala, India
- Died: 31 March 2010 (aged 52); Kodakara, Kerala, India
- Occupations: Documentary filmMaker, Activist
- Years active: 1985–2010
- Spouse: Sudha
- Parent(s): Chandrasekharan Nair & T. Sarada.
- Relatives: Darshana Rajendran (niece)

C. Saratchandran (1958–2010) (Sarat) was an Indian documentary filmmaker, based in Kerala, India. He was also a documentary activist, who managed to conduct hundreds of film screenings of documentaries and film classics in remote towns and villages in Kerala Saratchandran was born on 16 February 1958. His parents are Chandrasekharan Nair and T. Sarada. His maternal grandfather was Professor M. P. Manmathan, a well-known Gandhian and orator. He has two sisters, Neeraja Rajendran and Sarada Sunanda.

== Early life ==
Saratchandran studied at Mahatma Gandhi College, Thiruvananthapuram. As a student activist he participated in protests against the repression and human rights violations during the Internal Emergency (1975–1977) declared by then Prime Minister Indira Gandhi. After his graduation he joined a construction company as an accountant. Satatchandran was part of the group that published the radical magazines Samkramanam and Niyogam in the late 1970s and early 1980s.

== As cinema activist ==
He was also active in the successful fight against the decision of the government to construct a hydroelectric project in Silent Valley in the Western Ghats ranges of Kerala, which would have destroyed the pristine rainforests of the region. He was associated with the film making efforts of two stalwarts of Indian Cinema, G. Aravindan and John Abraham. John Abraham and Odessa Film Society under his leadership were trying to develop an alternate crowd funded filmmaking and distribution strategy that aimed to reach the people directly, breaking away from the commercially oriented film industry. Saratchandran imbibed the idea of this direct cinema approach and put it into practice successfully later. Later Saratchandan moved to Saudi Arabia and took up the job of Education Promotion Adviser with the British Council there. He came back to India in 1998 with a VHS camera and a video projector and started his stint as a filmmaker making his first five documentaries on VHS. With his video projector he traveled in the villages and cities of Kerala, Tamil Nadu, Karnata and states for screening his own films and others' films. His screenings helped in raising the awareness of the public on environment, human rights and other social issues. He often became involved with the peoples' struggles that formed the subject of all of his films. His long collaboration with P. Baburaj resulted in a few very important films that were acclaimed internationally. Sarat was one of the founders of the ViBGYOR Film Festival, one of the largest independent film festivals of South Asia. He was also an active member of Vikalp, a human rights platform protesting against censorship and freedom of expression.

== Death ==
He died on 31 March 2010 when he fell out of a train near Kodakara, Thrissur District while he was travelling from Thrissur to Ernakulam.

== Filmography ==
- 1987-Save the Western Ghats March: The Kerala Experience.
- 1989-No to Dams: A Pooyamkutty.
- 1989- Ellam Asthamikkum Munpe.
- 2001- Kanavu (Dream), a film on a tribal children's commune in Wayanad.
- 2003- Evicted from Justice – a video report on Muthanga massacre
- 2008- Yours Truly John, a video essay on John Abraham (director)
- 2001-To die for land – the ultimate sacrifice, on land Chengara struggle.

== Filmography Co-directed with P Baburaj ==
- 1999- Chaliyar...The Final Struggle - Special Mention award, Mumbai International Film Festival 2000 & The Bronze Tree Award, Vatavaran 2002
- 2003- The Bitter Drink -Documentary on the Plachimada Coca-Cola struggle
- 2005- Only An Axe Away – on Silent Valley- Jeevan TV award for Best documentary & Jury Prize, Mumbai International Film Festival, 2008
- 2006- 1000 Days and A Dream’. Second film on the Plachimada Coca-Cola struggle 10th Mumbai International Film Festival (MIFF) Indian Jury Award Winner.

== Associated in Making ==
- 1985- Living in Fear Directed by K. P. Sasi
- 1986- Purooravas Malayalm feature film Directed by Sivaprasad
- 1989- Narmada A Valley Refuses to Die Directed by K. P. Sasi
- 2000- Ek Alag Mausam a Hindi feature film Directed by K. P. Sasi
- 2001- The Eighteenth Elephant – 3 Monologues Directed by P Balan
- 2002-The Turtle PeopleDirected by Surabhi Sharma
- 2004- Express Highway: The Road to Destruction Directed by Sanju Surendran
