= Idiots (2012 film) =

- Directed by: K.S.Bava
- Story by: Sangeeth Sivan
- Produced by: T. P. Agarwal; Sangeeth Sivan
- Starring: Asif Ali; Sanusha
- Music by: Nandu Kartha
- Production companies: Capital Films; Sangeeth Sivan Productions
- Release date: 30 November 2012
- Running time: 120 min
- Country: India
- Language: Malayalam

Idiots is a 2012 Indian Malayalam-language romantic comedy film, directed by K S Bava (in his directorial debut). The film stars Asif Ali and Sanusha, and was co-produced by prominent filmmaker Sangeeth Sivan.

== Plot ==
A rich heiress hires a killer Beeran to kill her to put the blame on her boyfriend for cheating her. Beeran hires Freddy a juice stall vendor to do the same. At the same time a thief and a small time footballer enters the house to steal but leaves empty handed after the heiress finds him. Freddy reaches the heiress's house and plans to kill her by poisoning her.

But the thief reaches the flat at the same time to erase his fingerprints from the tables and chairs so that even if the heiress dies, he won't be blamed. But all the three feel that if the heiress wants to die without pain she has to go out. So they all go near a bridge. But during a fight between the thief and Freddy, the heiress accidentally falls from the bridge. When she regains her consciousness she finds the thief along with her and realizes that she hasn't died. She starts calling the thief as 'Messi.' They go in search of Freddy. Along their journey, they grow closer and slowly fall in love. But the heiress after a small fight with Messi stands in a bus stop which unknown to both of them was the stop for prostitutes. The heiress is arrested under prostitution charges but Messi bails her out. They go to a roadside stall and eat their food when the heiress asks Messi about travelling in the ambulance parked in front of them, which Messi refuses. The heiress reveals the name of her perfume to Messi which he had been asking a lot about after she sees his care and love towards her if she goes missing. Thus she falls in love with Messi and they confess it.

They go meet the heiress's cheater boyfriend and with the encouragement from Messi, the heiress slaps him. Then the movie moves to Beeran's part, where they kidnap the heiress and Messi and Freddy together rescue the heiress. The movie ends with the heiress calling Messi, to which he replies his name is not Messi. However the name of the thief is not audible and thus the movie ends..

== Cast ==
- Asif Ali as the Thief and a footballer whom the heiress calls as 'Messi'
- Sanusha as the Rich heiress
- Baburaj as Freddy
- Vijayaraghavan as Beeran
- Sunil Sukhada as SI Murugan
- Praveen Prem as Mani
- Kalabhavan Haneef
- Vinod Kedamangalam
- Binoy
- Dileesh Nair
- Vishnu Nandan
- Nandu
- Alex Mathew

== Reception ==
The film received positive reviews upon release. Sreenath Nair of The Hindu was critical about the film, especially the script, camera and direction. In his review, he comments, "Good art seldom allows the viewer digressions. But, if one starts relishing the taste of popcorn and coffee more than anything during a movie, the work is not riveting. Idiots, K.S. Bava's directorial debut, gives one ample opportunities for such culinary digressions." Paresh C Palicha of Rediff.com rated the film 1.5|5 and concluded his review saying, "Idiots is a film that you would like to forget as soon as you get out of the theatre. Idiots lives up to its name."
