= Dhumal =

Dhumal is a surname of Indian origin. People with that name include:

- Dhumal (actor) (Anant Balwant Dhumal, 1914-1987), Bollywood actor
- Aditya Dhumal (born 1994), Indian cricketer for Mumbai
- Madhukar Dhumal (born 1960), Indian musician
- Nikit Dhumal (born 1991), Indian cricketer for Maharashtra
- Prem Kumar Dhumal (born 1944), Indian politician
- Yusuf Osman Dhumal (active from 1988), Somali military official
