= Mehnajpur =

- village
- Location in Uttar Pradesh, India Mehnajpur (India)
- Coordinates: 25.6722°N 83.1181°E
- Country: India
- State: Uttar Pradesh
- District: Azamgarh

Government
  - Type: State Govt

Population
  - Total: 60,000

Languages
  - Official: Hindi
- Time zone: UTC+5:30 (IST)
- Nearest city: Varanasi

Mehnajpur is a village in Azamgarh District, India. Mehnajpur has its own post office, police station and a well-developed market place. It is located about 50 km from Varanasi. Nearest village is Lalmau and Barwa. Some adjoining areas are Tarwa (Amar Singh (politician) House) and Deogaon. Half of the Mehnajpur Bazar comes under Panchayat of Village Barwa. Mehnajpur is at the trijunction of 3 districts (Azamgarh, Ghazipur and Jaunpur).
