= Menawali =

Village in Maharashtra

Religion
- Affiliation: Hinduism
- District: Satara

Location
- Location: Menavli
- Country: India
- Interactive map of Menawali

Architecture
- Type: Nagara

Menavli is a village about three kilometres from Wai in the Satara district. The village's claim to fame is due to the palace (wada) built by Nana Fadnavis, 18th century Maratha statesman and the regent of Peshwa Madhavrao II.

== Fadnavis Wada ==
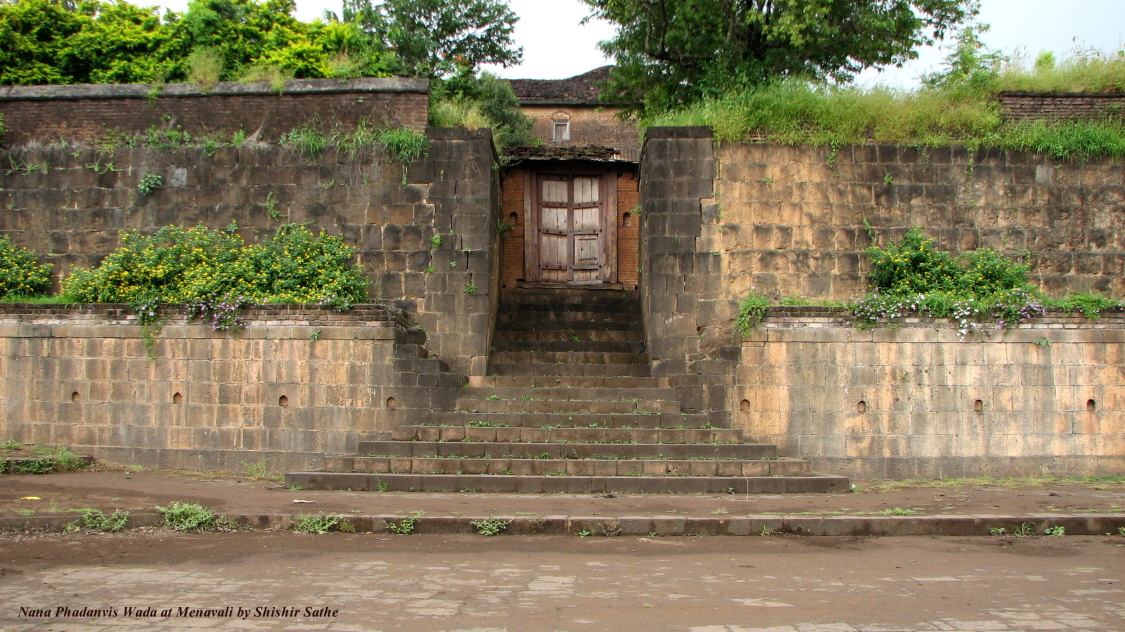
Rear entrance to Nana Phadanvis Wada

The Nana Phadnavis Wada is a large six-quadrangular, perimeter-protected wada.

=== History ===
The architectural combination of a Wada-type residence, a Ghat on a water-body and a Temple was typical of Peshwa era. This construction was completed around 1780. The Phadnavis wada is one of the very rare places where such a combination is preserved intact. Originally, simple stone steps descending into a river, ghats evolved into an elaborate arrangement of terraces with separate areas for different activities, such as bathing, washing, filling water and performing religious rites. Temples were traditionally built on ghats The Shiva temple on the ghat has a bell which was taken from a Portuguese church inside Vasai Fort by Chimaji Appa, Maratha general and brother of Bajirao I when he captured the fort from the Portuguese in 1739.

Nana, being the Peshwas' record keeper transcribed and maintained their documents of accounts and administrative letters in the ancient "Modi" script. These documents, known as the famous "Menavli Daptar" were preserved in this Wada at Menavli.The Daptar documents are now preserved at Deccan College, Pune

=== The Wada and the surroundings today ===
The Nana Phadnavis Wada today remains with his descendants. Having split the major part of his properties between themselves, the Wada is still owned jointly by them all. Wadas are systems of open courtyards of increasing security. The wada here has six courtyards. Nana's corridors on the upper floor are lined with teak-wood lattice work. A concealed escape stairway in the wall leads out of the Wada. Descending the stone steps leads to the ghat on the river Krishna. On descending the steps. There is a dark musty, narrow, steep staircase concealed in the metre-thick wall to the floor above. The staircase was at once secret and easily secured, admitting only one person at a time into Nana Phadnavis's darbar hall. The wada contains Murals that have been classified under Maratha painting. A mural here depicts Sita in Marathi saree., Some of the paintings depict Krishna with Gopis

== Movie location ==
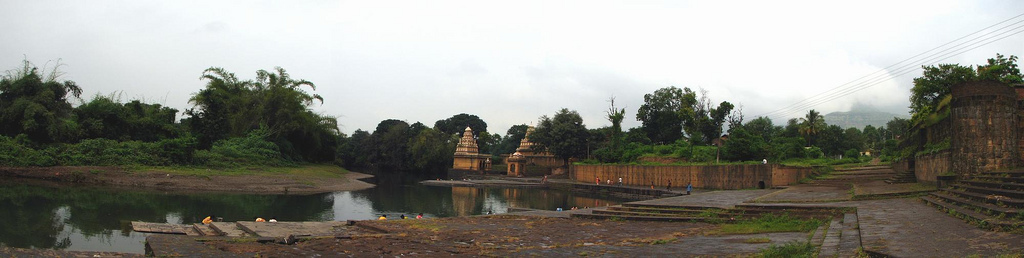
Nana Fadnavis Wada

Several Bollywood movies have been shot, using the wada as an exotic location, notably, Yudh (Jackie Shroff/Tina Munim), Mrityudand (Madhuri Dixit), Goonj Uthi Shehnai, Jis Desh Mein Ganga Rehta Hain (Govinda), Gangaajal (Ajay Devgan), Sarja (Ajinkya Deo), Bajirao Mastani and Swades (Shahrukh Khan, Gayatri Joshi). The film crew of the movie Swades, once camped at the ghat to shoot some footage. The crew cleaned and painted the old stone walls of the ghat and the temples.
