= Ilayum Mullum =

Ilayum Mullum (Leaves and Thorns)
- Directed by: K. P. Sasi
- Starring: Thilakan, Pallavi Joshi, Shanthi Krishna, Shammi Thilakan
- Cinematography: R.V. Ramani
- Release date: 1994
- Country: India
- Language: Malayalam

Ilayum Mullum, also known as Leaves and Thorns, is a 1994 Indian Malayalam film, directed by K. P. Sasi, starring Thilakan and Pallavi Joshi in the lead roles.

== Cast ==
- Pallavi Joshi as Shantha (Voice By Kukku Parameshwaran)
- Shanthi Krishna as Parvathy (Voice by Aanandavally)
- Kanya as Lakshmi (Voice by Suma Sakriya)
- Sabnam as Sridevi
- Thilakan
- Nedumudi Venu
- Shammi Thilakan
- Baiju Santhosh

== Participation in film festivals ==
Ilayum Mullum has been screened in the following festivals:

- Venice International Film Festival Critics Week
- Montreal World Film Festival
- Toronto Film Festival
- Sydney Film Festival
- Nantes Festival of Three Continents
- Fribourg International Film Festival
- Cairo International Film Festival
- Izmir International Film Festival (Turkey)
- Cape Town International Film Festival
- Munich International Film Festival
- International Film Festival of India
- Indian Panorama
- International Festival of Rural Films, France

== Awards ==
Ilayum Mullum won the Prix du Jury award for Best Film, Prix des Lyceens.
