= Bombay Mittayi =

- Film poster
- Directed by: Umar Karikkad
- Written by: Nizam Rawther
- Produced by: U Pradeep; Rajesh Malakka
- Starring: Vinu Mohan; Sreenivasan; Neelambari; Sarayu; Dimple Kapadia
- Cinematography: Loganathan; Lal Kannan
- Edited by: Babu Rathinam
- Music by: Chandran Veyattummal
- Distributed by: Sri Gokulam Films
- Release date: Cancelled or: 17 December 2011
- Country: India
- Language: Malayalam

Bombay Mittayi (transl. Bombay Sweets) is a 2011 Indian Malayalam-language film directed by Umar Karikkad starring Vinu Mohan, Neelambari, Amar Singh and Sreenivasan in the lead roles. This film marks the acting debut of leading politician Amar Singh. This film also marks the entry of Bollywood actress Dimple Kapadia into Malayalam cinema. Sri Lankan actress Neelambari Perumal enters Indian Cinema through this film.

== Plot ==
Bombay Mittayi tells the story of Suresh and Prathapan who would do anything to earn some quick money. They get involved in several activities such as exporting of snake venom, Nagamnaickyam and even silver owls. Suresh is a gifted singer. However, as fate would have it, his music has not helped him much in life. Sulaiman is much older to Suresh and has always indulged in petty fraudulent activities to make some quick bucks. Meanwhile, world-renowned Ghazal artist Mallika Mansoor is found to be murdered. The investigation points to Suresh and Sulaiman as the main culprits. Rehana who is Mallika's daughter sets up her own inquiry into the murder to find out the murderers. In the process she saves Suresh and Suliamnan from the clutches of Poocha Police.

== Cast ==
- Vinu Mohan as Suresh
- Neelambari Perumal as Karthika
- Sreenivasan as Prathapan
- Sarayu as Prathapan's Wife
- Atluri Venkat
- Mukesh (cameo appearance)
- Amar Singh as Mallika Mansoor
- Dimple Kapadia as Mallika Mansoor's wife
- Harisree Ashokan as Sulaiman
- Jagathy Sreekumar
- Suraj Venjarammood
- Jayan Cherthala
- Salim Kumar
- Mamukkoya
- Bheeman Raghu
- Atlas Ramachandran
- Machan Varghese
- Narayanan Kutty
- Murugan
- Kottayam Nazeer
- Darsha
- Kalpana
- Shobha Mohan
- Kanakalatha
- Sona Nair

== Soundtrack ==
Bombay Mittayi

Soundtrack album by Paris V Chandran
- Released: 12 May 2010
- Recorded: Satyam Audios Studio
- Genre: World Music
- Label: Satyam Audios
- Producer: Sri Gokulam films

The music of Bombay Mittayi is by Paris V Chandran. The lyrics are penned by Rafeeque Ahammed and Mukesh Lal. There are five songs in the film. The singers are K. J. Yesudas, G Venugopal, K. S. Chitra, Pradeep Palluruthy, Vithu Prathap, Ravishankar, Midhu Vincent, Geetha Jith and Jos Sagar.

Track listing
No.	Title	Performer(s)	Length
1.	"Kochu Kuttiyole"	Pradeep Palluruthy
2.	"Meera than"	K. S. Chitra
3.	"Mannum Ponnai"	Vidhu Prathap, Ravishankar, Midhu Vincent, Geetha Jith
4.	"Himagiri"	K. J. Yesudas, Jos Sagar
5.	"Meera than"	G. Venugopal
