= Swades =

2004 film directed by Ashutosh Gowariker

- Theatrical release poster
- Directed by: Ashutosh Gowariker
- Screenplay by: Ashutosh Gowariker; Sameer Sharma; Lalit Marathe; Amin Hajee; Charlotte Witby-Coles; Yashodeep Nigudkar; Ayan Mukerji
- Story by: M. G. Sathya; Ashutosh Gowariker
- Dialogues by: K. P. Saxena
- Produced by: Ashutosh Gowariker
- Starring: Shah Rukh Khan; Gayatri Joshi; Kishori Ballal
- Cinematography: Mahesh Aney
- Edited by: Ballu Saluja
- Music by: A. R. Rahman
- Production companies: UTV Motion Pictures; Ashutosh Gowariker Productions
- Distributed by: UTV Motion Pictures
- Release date: 17 December 2004
- Running time: 195 minutes
- Country: India
- Language: Hindi
- Budget: ₹25 crore
- Box office: est. ₹34.64 crore

Swades (transl. Homeland) is a 2004 Indian Hindi-language drama film co-written, directed and produced by Ashutosh Gowariker. The film stars Shah Rukh Khan, Gayatri Joshi, Kishori Ballal, Daya Shankar Pandey, Rajesh Vivek, and Lekh Tandon.

The plot was based on two episodes of the series Vaapsi on Zee TV's Yule Love Stories (1994–95) which starred Gowariker. The story of a man setting up a micro hydroelectric project to generate electricity was reported to be inspired by the 2003 Kannada film Chigurida Kanasu which was based on the novel of the same name by K. Shivaram Karanth and Bapu Kuti by Rajni Bakshi. Story writer MG Sathya had revealed that he was swayed over by the Gandhian principles and the socio - political environment during his formative years while studying in Kannada medium school in Jalahalli, Bengaluru. The music and background score was composed by A. R. Rahman, with lyrics penned by Javed Akhtar.

Swades was theatrically released on 17 December 2004, to critical acclaim. However, it emerged as a commercial failure at the box office. At the 50th Filmfare Awards, Swades won Best Actor (Khan) and Best Background Score (Rahman). Despite its commercial failure, Swades is regarded ahead of its time and is considered a cult classic of Hindi cinema and one of Khan's best films. The film is owned by Red Chillies Entertainment.

== Plot ==
Mohan Bhargava is a successful Non-Resident Indian (NRI) working as a Project Manager on the Global Precipitation Measurement (GPM) program for NASA in Washington, D.C. Mohan originally relocated to the United States for his higher education and chose to remain there after his parents tragically died in a car accident in India. Over time, he becomes deeply concerned about Kaveri Amma, the beloved nanny who raised him during his childhood in Uttar Pradesh. Following his parents' deaths, Kaveri Amma had relocated to an old age home in Delhi and eventually lost touch with him.

Hoping to find Kaveri Amma and bring her back to live with him in the United States, Mohan takes a few weeks of leave following the successful launch of his project's first phase. He visits the Delhi old age home, only to discover that she relocated a year prior to a remote village named Charanpur. To ensure he has access to modern amenities during his journey, Mohan rents a fully equipped recreational vehicle and drives to the village.

Upon arriving in Charanpur, Mohan reunites with Kaveri Amma and reconnects with his childhood friend, Geeta. He learns that Geeta brought Kaveri Amma to live with her family after Mohan's parents passed away. Geeta runs the local village school and works tirelessly to improve the community through education, though her efforts are constantly hindered by deep-seated caste segregation and religious biases. Geeta initially resents Mohan's presence, fearing he will take Kaveri Amma away and leave her and her younger brother, Nandan, isolated. Kaveri Amma informs Mohan that she cannot leave until she fulfills her responsibility of securing a suitable marriage alliance for Geeta. Drawn to Geeta’s progressive ideals regarding women's empowerment and gender equality, Mohan decides to assist her by actively campaigning for the education of girls and marginalized lower-caste communities. He quickly befriends two locals, Nivaaran and Mela Ram, who join his advocacy, earning the respect of the benevolent village chief, Dadaji.

As Mohan and Geeta grow closer, Kaveri Amma sends Mohan to the neighboring village of Kodi to collect land rent from a tenant named Haridas. The visit profoundly alters Mohan's worldview. He finds Haridas living in extreme poverty, unable to provide daily meals for his family. Haridas explains that as a member of a marginalized caste, his traditional weaving occupation collapsed, forcing him into tenant farming. Consequently, the upper-caste villagers socially boycotted him and denied his crops access to the local water supply. Confronted by this systemic oppression, Mohan realizes that millions of rural citizens endure similar hardships. He returns to Charanpur deeply shaken and resolves to use his engineering expertise to uplift the community.

Extending his vacation by three weeks, Mohan addresses Charanpur's severe infrastructure deficit, specifically its inconsistent electricity and frequent blackouts. He conceives a plan to establish a localized, sustainable micro-hydroelectric power plant utilizing a nearby mountain spring. Financing the necessary industrial equipment entirely out of his own pocket, Mohan mobilizes the divided villagers to collectively construct a water reservoir and turbine system. The project succeeds, providing Charanpur with consistent, self-sustaining electricity.

Following the sudden death of Dadaji, Mohan faces immense pressure from NASA to return to Washington, as the GPM project has entered its critical final phase. When he asks Kaveri Amma to join him, she declines, stating that she is too old to adapt to a foreign country. Geeta similarly asserts her commitment to her homeland, explicitly asking Mohan to permanently relocate to India. Torn between his corporate ambitions and his newfound purpose, Mohan returns to the United States to fulfill his contractual obligations. However, plagued by memories of his time in Charanpur, he finds himself increasingly alienated by his American lifestyle. Following the successful launch of the satellite project, Mohan resigns from NASA and permanently returns to India. He plans to manage a regional collaboration from the Vikram Sarabhai Space Centre, allowing him to serve his country while maintaining his scientific ties to NASA. The narrative concludes with Mohan playfully wrestling Nivaaran outside the village temple.

== Cast ==
- Shah Rukh Khan as Mohan Bhargav, a NASA scientist
- Gayatri Joshi as Gita, Mohan's childhood friend
- Kishori Ballal as Kaveri Amma, Mohan's nanny
- Smith Seth as Nandan 'Chiku', Gitu's younger brother
- Lekh Tandon as Dadaji
- Rajesh Vivek as Nivaaran Dayal Shrivastav, a postman
- Dayashankar Pandey as Mela Ram, an eatery owner
- Farrukh Jaffar as Panch Fatima Bi
- V.M. Badola as Panch Munishwar
- Bhim Vakani as Panch Narayan
- Dilip Ambedkar as Panch Hariya
- Raja Awasthi as Panch Gundagin
- Rajesh Balwani as Rahul Sinha
- Rahul Vohra as Vinod Raaz, Mohan's colleague
- Makarand Deshpande as Fakir, a traveller who shows Mohan the way to Charanpur

== Production ==
=== Inspiration ===
Swades is inspired by the story of Aravinda Pillalamarri and Ravi Kuchimanchi, the non-resident Indian couple who returned to India and developed a pedal power generator to light remote, off-the-grid village schools. Gowariker spent considerable time with Pillalamarri and Kuchimanchi, both dedicated Association for India's Development (AID) volunteers. He supposedly visited Bilgaon, an Adivasi village in the Narmada valley, which is the backdrop of the Narmada Bachao Andolan (NBA) movement. The people of Bilgaon are credited with doing 200 person-days of shramdaan (community service) to make their village energy self-sufficient. The Bilgaon project is recognised as a model for replication by the Government of Maharashtra.

The film was reported to be inspired by two episodes of the series titled Vaapsi on Zee TV's Yule Love Stories (1993–95). The story of the lead role setting up a micro hydro electric project to generate electricity was reported to be inspired by the Kannada novel Chigurida Kanasu by K. Shivaram Karanth and Bapu Kuti by Rajni Bakshi.

=== Themes ===
Mahatma Gandhi's great-grandson, Tushar Gandhi, noted the theme of Gandhism in the film. The name of the main character portrayed by Shah Rukh Khan is Mohan, which was Gandhi's birth name (Mohandas or "Mohan"). The film opens with the quotation:

Hesitating to act because the whole vision might not be achieved, or because others do not yet share it, is an attitude that only hinders progress.

— Mahatma Gandhi

Gowariker tries to address the lack of scientific temperament and widespread ignorance among the rural folks through the energetic number "Ye Tara Wo Tara", where Mohan is seen encouraging the children to experience the fascinating world of stars through his telescope. In a symbolic manner, the song rejects the defunct divisions of caste and class and at the same time, through its protagonist, tries to instill in the audience an appreciation of curiosity and observation.

=== Casting and filming ===
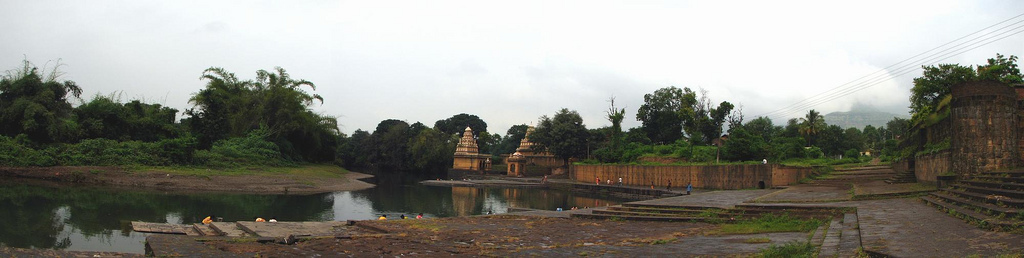
Panorama of Menawali, the village in Maharashtra where Swades was shot

Gowariker initially offered Mohan's role to Aamir Khan (who worked in Gowariker's 2001 film Lagaan), but he rejected it because he found the story to be weak. Mohan's role was then offered to Hrithik Roshan, who refused after reading the script. Gowariker contemplated casting R. Madhavan before offering Mohan's role to Shah Rukh, who finally accepted it after listening to the story and he started crying during the story's narration. Bhanu Athaiya, an Oscar winner for Gandhi (1982), was the costume designer for the film.

Swades was the first Indian film to be shot inside the NASA headquarters and inside the NASA research center at the Launch Pad 39A of the Kennedy Space Center in Florida. The rainfall monitoring satellite known as the Global Precipitation Measurement (GPM) in the film is an actual NASA mission and was launched in 2014. A major part of the film was shot in Menawali, Maharashtra.

== Soundtrack ==
The song "Dekho Naa" is a modified version of the song "Kichchu Tha" from the film, Baba (2002). The song "Aahista Aahista" is set in raag Charukesi. The song "Yeh Taara" is set in raag Kalavati.

Swades

Soundtrack album by A. R. Rahman
- Released: 10 November 2004
- Recorded: Panchathan Record Inn
- Genre: Feature film soundtrack
- Label: T-Series
- Producer: A. R. Rahman

A. R. Rahman chronology
New (2002)	Swades (2004)	Kisna: The Warrior Poet (2005)

Professional ratings
Review scores
Source	Rating
Planet Bollywood	link

All lyrics are written by Javed Akhtar; all music is composed by A. R. Rahman.

No.	Title	Artist(s)	Length
1.	"Yeh Taara Woh Taara (Raga Kalavati)"	Udit Narayan, Master Vignesh, Baby Pooja	7:13
2.	"Saanwariya Saanwariya"	Alka Yagnik	5:17
3.	"Yun Hi Chala Chal"	Udit Narayan, Kailash Kher, Hariharan	7:28
4.	"Yeh Jo Des Hai Tera"	A. R. Rahman	6:28
5.	"Aahista Aahista (Raga Charukeshi)"	Udit Narayan, Sadhana Sargam	6:35
6.	"Pal Pal Hai Bhaari (Raga Jaunpuri)"	Madhushree, Vijay Prakash	6:50
7.	"Dekho Na"	Alka Yagnik, Udit Narayan	5:46
8.	"Pal Pal Hai Bhaari" (Flute)	Naveen	3:38
9.	"Yeh Jo Des Hai Tera" (Shehnai)	Madhukar Dhumal	4:00

On 27 March 2021, members of United States Navy Band sang "Yeh Jo Des Hai Tera" for Taranjit Singh Sandhu, the Ambassador of India to the United States and United States Navy Chief of Naval Operations at a special dinner event. The video of the band members singing surfaced on Twitter and received praise and nostalgia from Shahrukh Khan, A. R. Rahman and netizens alike.

=== Tamil version ===
The Tamil soundtrack under the title Desam was composed by A.R. Rahman. All Lyrics were written by Vaali. According to the Indian trade website Box Office India, with around 13,00,000 units sold, this film's soundtrack album was the eleventh highest-selling of the year.

Title	Singer(s)	Length
"Thirukona Moolam"	S.P. Balasubrahmanyam, Master Vignesh, Baby Pooja	7:13
"Kaaviriya Kaaviriya"	Madhushree, Alka Yagnik (humming)	5:17
"Unnai Kelai"	T. L. Maharajan, Hariharan	7:28
"Unthan Desathin Kural"	A. R. Rahman	6:28
"Thai Sonna"	K. J. Yesudas, Madhushree	6:35
"Mazhai Mega Vanna"	K. S. Chithra, Srinivas	6:50
"Kettenaa Naan"	Mohammed Aslam, Sadhana Sargam	5:46
"Unthan Desathin Kural" (Shehnai)	Madhukar T. Dhumal	4:00

== Reception ==
=== Critical reception ===
The film received universal critical acclaim and went on to become a cult classic, and Khan's performance as Mohan Bhargava is considered one of his best to date.

Subhash K. Jha of Indiatimes Movies gave the film 4.5 stars out of 5 and said, "Swades is a unique experiment with grassroots realism. It is so politically correct in its propagandist message that initially you wonder if the Government of India funded the director's dream."

Mayank Shekhar from Mid-Day gave it 4 stars, stating, "I cannot think of a better film for the longest that deserved a stronger recommendation for both touring cinemas of India's villages, and plush multiplexes of Mumbai or Manhattan."

Jitesh Pillai of the Sunday Times of India gave the film 4 stars and said "After Lagaan, what? The answer's blowing in the wind. Swades! Here's the verdict: This is a gutsy and outstanding film. Welcome back to real, solid film-making." He added, "Swades is undoubtedly the No. 1 movie of the year."

Shradha Sukumaran of Mid-Day gave it 3.5 stars and said, "At the end of it, Swades is a far braver film than Lagaan. It could have hit the high note – if it hadn't tried so hard."

Avijit Ghosh wrote in The Telegraph, "With its gentle humour, the film acts as an entertaining vehicle for social change. And hopefully, it will do more for positive nationalism than the Union government's Directorate of Audio Visual Publicity (DAVP) ads ever will."

=== Box office ===
Swades earned ₹15.25 crore (US$1.6 million) net box office in India. In the overseas market, the film made $2,790,000. It had a lifetime worldwide gross of ₹34.64 crore (US$3.6 million). The film topped the box office in Chennai on its opening weekend.

== Awards ==
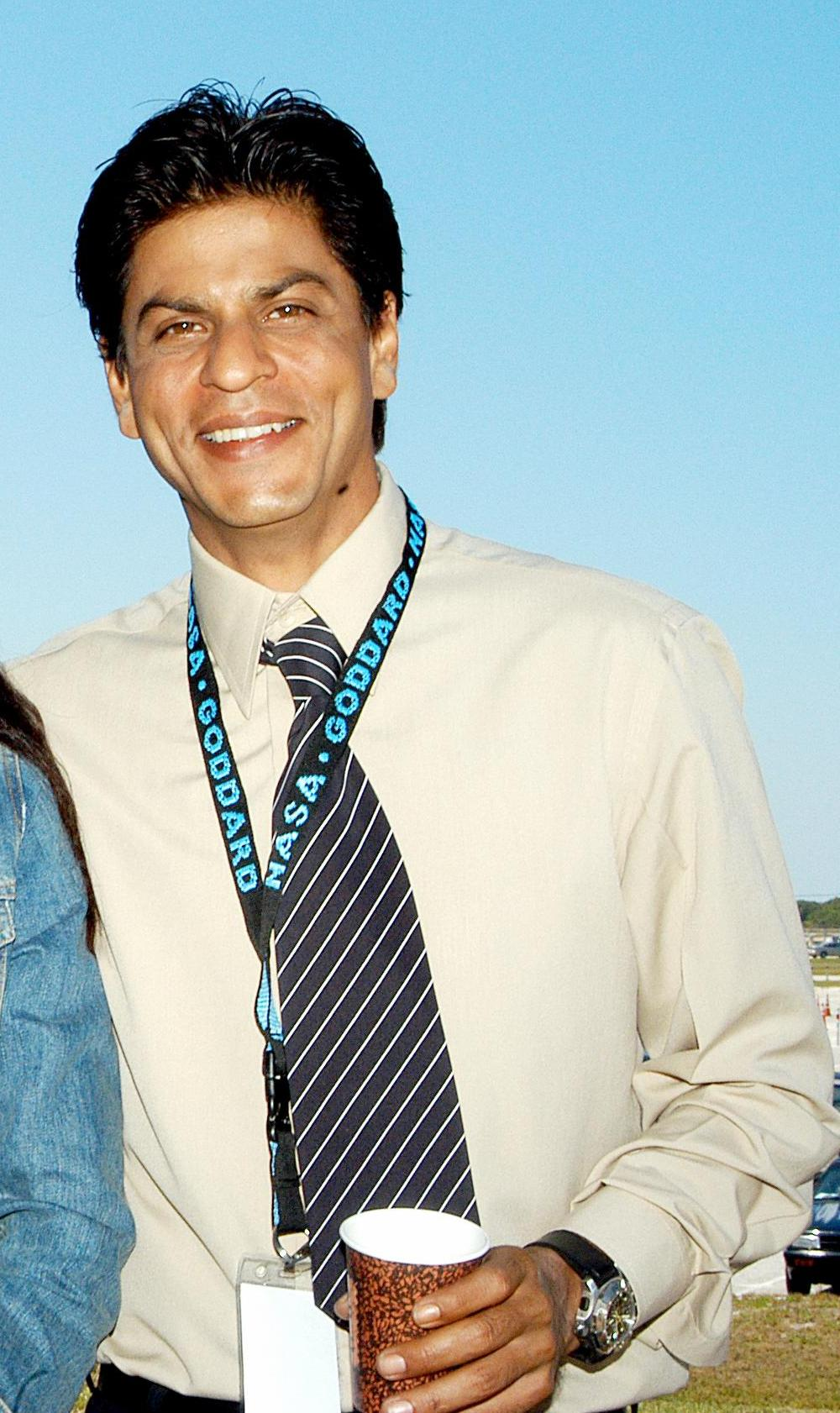
Shah Rukh Khan at Kennedy Space Center in Merritt Island, Florida. Khan earned critical acclaim for his portrayal of a NASA Scientist in this film

=== National Film Awards ===
- Best Male Playback Singer – Udit Narayan for "Yeh Taara Woh Taara"
- Best Cinematography – Mahesh Aney

=== Global Indian Film Awards ===
- Best Actor – Shahrukh Khan
- Best Newcomer – Gayatri Joshi

=== Zee Cine Awards ===
- Best Director (Critics) – Ashutosh Gowariker
- Best Female Debut – Gayatri Joshi
- Best Story – Ashutosh Gowariker
- Best Sound Re-recording – Hitendra Ghosh

=== Star Screen Awards ===
- Most Promising Female Newcomer – Gayatri Joshi

=== Stardust Awards ===
- Dream Director – Ashutosh Gowariker

=== Bollywood Movie Awards ===
- Best Female Debut – Gayatri Joshi

=== Film Café Awards ===
- Best Actor – Shahrukh Khan

=== 50th Filmfare Awards: ===
Won

- Best Actor – Shah Rukh Khan
- Best Background Score – A. R. Rahman

Nominated

- Best Film – Ashutosh Gowariker
- Best Director – Ashutosh Gowariker
- Best Music Director – A. R. Rahman
- Best Lyricist – Javed Akhtar for "Yeh Taara Woh Taara"
- Best Male Playback Singer – Udit Narayan and Master Vignesh for "Yeh Taara Woh Taara"
- Best Female Playback Singer – Alka Yagnik for "Saawariya"

== Legacy ==
The character of Mohan Bhargav, played by Khan, was reprised again in Brahmāstra: Part One – Shiva. Director Ayan Mukerji confirmed that it is the same character from Swades. In the 2023 film Jawan, Khan's character Azad is raised by a character named Kaveri after his parents are presumed dead.

== See also ==
- Swadeshi movement
