= Gayatri Joshi =

Indian actress (born 1977)

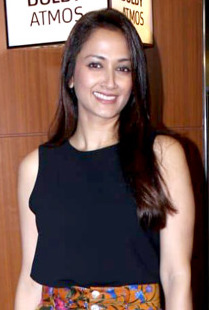
- Joshi in 2018
- Born: Nagpur, Maharashtra, India
- Education: Sydenham College
- Occupations: Business Person; Actress; Model; Video jockey
- Years active: 1999–2004
- Height: 1.7 m (5 ft 7 in)
- Spouse: Vikas Oberoi (m. 2005)
- Children: Vihaan and Yuvaan

Gayatri Joshi is an Indian former actress, video jockey, model and beauty pageant titleholder. She won the title of Femina Miss India International in the year 2000 and represented India at Miss International 2000. She starred in the 2004 film Swades, her only acting credit to date. Following her marriage to businessman Vikas Oberoi in 2005, she quit acting.

== Personal life and education ==
She was born into a Marathi-speaking Joshi family in Nagpur, Maharashtra, India. Joshi studied at Mount Carmel High School in Nagpur, and when the family re-located to Mumbai, she was enrolled in the J. B. Vachha High School. After completing her schooling, she went on to study in Sydenham College of Commerce and Economics. She then went on to obtain a degree in Commerce from the same college. On 27 August 2005, she married Vikas Oberoi, a promoter of Oberoi Realty Limited and subsequently retired from the film industry.

== Career ==
Joshi started her career by becoming a video jockey on Channel V India. She then left to pursue her dream of winning the Femina India beauty pageant. Joshi was one of the final five candidates in the 1999 Femina Miss India beauty pageant, and was crowned on Sony Entertainment Channel through voting by viewers, and was chosen to represent India at the 2000 Miss International event in Japan. She has worked as an advertising model in addition to making appearances in several music videos: She appeared in music videos of Jagjit Singh's "Kaghaz Ki Kashti" and Hans Raj Hans' "Jhanjaria". While still attending college, she modelled for Bombay Dyeing, Philips, Pond's, Godrej, Sunsilk and LG, as well as Hyundai advertisements with Shah Rukh Khan. She also modelled for the Seasons Catalogue and Calendar during 2001.

Joshi made her acting debut with the 2004 Ashutosh Gowarikar's Swades, opposite Shahrukh Khan. She played an educated village girl Geeta in the film, which received strong acclaim from film critics and audience. Jitesh Pillai of The Times of India noted, "Gayatri makes a confident first impression investing Geeta with sensitivity." The film was a success and earned her several accolades. Swades remains Joshi's only acting credit as she quit acting the following year.

== Filmography ==
Year	Film	Role	Notes	Ref.
2004	Swades	Geeta "Gitli"	Only acting credit	

== Accolades ==
- 2005: Bollywood Movie Award for Best Female Debut for Swades.
- 2005: Global Indian Film Award for Best Female Debut for Swades.
- 2005: Screen Award Most Promising Newcomer - Female for Swades.
- 2005: Zee Cine Award Best Female Debut for Swades.

Preceded by (India) Srikrupa Murali	Femina Miss India International; 2000	Succeeded by (India) Kanwal Toor
