= Kazhakam =

- Directed by: MP Sukumaran Nair
- Written by: MP Sukumaran Nair
- Screenplay by: MP Sukumaran Nair
- Produced by: MP Sukumaran Nair
- Cinematography: Aswini Koaul
- Edited by: M.S.Mani
- Music by: Kaithapram Damodaran Namboothiri (Songs); Jerry Amaldev (Background Music)
- Release date: 1996
- Country: India
- Language: Malayalam

Kazhakam is a 1996 Indian Malayalam film directed by M. P. Sukumaran Nair and starring Nedumudi Venu and Urvashi in the lead roles.

== Plot ==
Radha is a village girl living close to the temple with her ill mother. Radha is not married as both her father and brother were dead which destabilised her mother's mental health. Her house accommodates the pilgrims to the temple. Nedumudi Venu and Mullanezhi are the temple workers and close friends of Radha. Radha makes flower chains for the lord at the temple. She makes a living by selling milk. A newly appointed teacher, Nandini Kukku Parameshwaran comes to the village. As there are no other safe and comfortable lodging available, Nandini stays at Radha's house. Nandini has a baby son, Kannan. When Nandini goes to work, Radha takes care of Kannan. This develops unbreakable bond between Radha and Kannan. Soon, Nandini found out that she is pregnant with her second child, by the time, Radha became almost a mother to Kannan, loving and caring him more than his biological mother.

Nandini and Kannan once goes to their hometown and Radha sees a nightmare during this time. This nightmare visibly upsets Radha. Once Nandini and Kannan come back, Kannan falls sick. Though treated by the village vaidyar the boy doesn't get better. Radha takes the lead and gets the boy to the hospital. A fully pregnant Nandini gets admitted in the next ward leaving Radha alone with Kannan. Radha sees Kannan dying.

The incident damages Radha's mental health. She decides to do nithyabhali and this is questioned by her friends as Kannan was only a guest in Radha's home. To which Radha responds that it was the God himself.

Radha after performing the rituals for Kannan takes a dip at the pond and doesn't reappear.

== Cast ==
- Urvashi as Radha
- Nedumudi Venu as Aashaan
- Ravi Vallathol as Chandran Pillai
- Mullanezhi as Thirumeni
- Cuckoo Parameswaran as Nandhini, Chandran Pillai's wife
- Meena Ganesh as Women at the hospital
- Valsala Menon as Radha's mother
- Mukundan as Manikkuttan

== Awards ==
Kerala State Film Award

- Best Film - MP Sukumaran Nair
- Best Actress - Urvashi
