= Mahesh Aney =

Indian cinematographer

Mahesh Aney is an Indian cinematographer known for his work in Hindi films.

== Career ==
A Film and Television Institute of India (FTII) graduate with specialization in cinematography, Mahesh Aney has shot more than a thousand commercials including films for Pepsi, Kellogg's, Tata Steel, Feviqik and Maggie noodles. He runs his own production house and has produced more than fifty commercials for brands like Coca-Cola, Vicks, Onida TV, Nivea Cream, Cinthol Soap and Johnnie Walker Golf.

Aney has also conceptualized and directed television shows like Movers & Shakers, Bindaas Bol, Kya Masti Kya Dhoom and Wajood, which have won several awards. He has worked as a cinematographer on films like God Only Knows!, Tum: A Dangerous Obsession and Swades.

== Personal life ==
Mahesh Aney is married to Anjali Aney, has two children Aarti and Aditya, and lives in Mumbai.

== Filmography ==
=== Feature films ===
Year	Title	Notes
2004	God Only Knows!	
2004	Tum?: A Dangerous Obsession	
2005	Swades	Won - National Film Award for Best Cinematography
2005	The Hangman	
2007	Don't Stop Dreaming	
2010	Shukno Lanka	
2024	Swargandharva Sudhir Phadke	
2024	Dharmarakshak Mahaveer Chhatrapati Sambhaji Maharaj: Chapter 1	

== See also ==
- Indian cinematographers
- Cinema of India
