= Kattu Vannu Vilichappol =

2001 Indian-Malayalam language film

- Directed by: Sasi Paravoor
- Written by: Sasi Paravoor
- Produced by: Krishna Sasidharan; T. Haridas
- Starring: Chippy; Vijayaraghavan; Krishna Kumar
- Cinematography: K. G. Jayan
- Edited by: V. Venugopal
- Music by: M. G. Radhakrishnan (songs); Johnson (score)
- Production company: Harikrishna Films
- Release date: 21 June 2001
- Running time: 102 minutes
- Country: India
- Language: Malayalam
- Budget: ₹30 lakh (US$31,000)
- Box office: ₹15 lakh (US$16,000)

Kattu Vannu Vilichappol (transl. When the breeze came calling) is a 2001 Indian Malayalam-language drama film written and directed by C. Sasidharan Pillai, who often credited as Sasi Paravoor. The film stars Chippy, Vijayaraghavan and Krishna Kumar. It is produced by Krishna Sasidharan and T. Haridas under Harikrishna Films. K. G. Jayan handles the cinematography and V. Venugopal edits the film. M. G. Radhakrishnan composed the songs and Johnson did the background score. The film dealt with the issue of AIDS, the first film in Malayalam to do so.

Kattu Vannu Vilichappol was released in theaters on 21 June 2001 and received generally positive reviews from critics but failed commercially at the box office. The film won four Kerala Film Critics Association Awards.

== Plot ==
Seetha, who belongs to an orthodox upper-caste Hindu family, falls in love with the lower-caste Unni and elopes with him to Bombay, where he works as a journalist. Four years later, after Unni disappears for 3 months, a pregnant Seetha returns to her village. Seetha has only her parents to turn for help. Despite the problems with their daughter, her parents give her a warm welcome. Seetha learns through a newspaper that Unni died of HIV. The news spread like wild fire in the village, and people looked at her with disgust and suspicion that she might also be an AIDS patient. This leads to her isolation in her own home and village. A compassionate Muslim boatman named Abu offers Seetha help. However, their alliance leads to further isolation for both. Film director and Unni's friend Lohithadas visits them and revealed that Unni's death was not from HIV, as the newspapers falsely claimed, but that he was murdered by the Bombay underworld. Meanwhile, some villagers burn down Seetha's home and force her out. Abu escapes Seetha. On the run, she gave birth to her newborn baby in Abu's boat. They left their village and fled to another one.

== Cast ==
- Chippy as Seetha
- Vijayaraghavan as Abu
- Krishna Kumar as Unni
- Madampu Kunjukuttan as Raghavan Nair
- A. K. Lohithadas as himself
- T. V. Chandran as Achuthan Nair
- Jose Pellissery as Sankara Pillai
- Harisree Ashokan as Velappan
- Santha Devi as Umma

== Soundtrack ==
Kattu Vannu Vilichappol

Soundtrack album by M. G. Radhakrishnan
- Released: June 2001
- Genre: Feature film soundtrack
- Length: 8:56
- Label: Satyam Audios

The soundtrack album of the film was composed by M. G. Radhakrishnan for the lyrics penned by O. N. V. Kurup and Thirunalloor Karunakaran.

No.	Title	Lyrics	Singer(s)	Length
1.	"Kaatte Nee"	Thirunalloor Karunakaran	K. S. Chithra	03:32
2.	"Poomakal Vaazhunna"	O. N. V. Kurup	M. G. Sreekumar	05:24
Total length:				08:56

== Reception ==
Kattu Vannu Vilichappol generally received positive reviews. Made on a budget of ₹30 lakhs, the film grossed only ₹15 lakhs, making it a box office failure.

== Accolades ==
Kerala Film Critics Association Awards

- Second Best Actress – Chippy
- Best Cinematographer – K. G. Jayan
- Best Debut Director – Sasi Paravoor
- Best Male Playback Singer – M. G. Sreekumar
