= Smarakasilakal =

1977 novel by Punathil Kunjabdulla

Smarakasilakal (Memorial Stones)
- Author: Punathil Kunjabdulla
- Original title: സ്മാരകശിലകൾ
- Translator: Elzy Tharamangalam
- Illustrator: Artist Namboothiri
- Cover artist: Zainul Abid
- Language: Malayalam
- Genre: Novel
- Publisher: DC Books
- Publication date: March 1977
- Publication place: India
- English publication date: 2003
- Media type: Print
- Pages: 238
- Awards: 1978: Kerala Sahitya Akademi Award; 1980: Kendra Sahitya Akademi Award
- ISBN: 8-171-30181-9

Smarakasilakal is a Malayalam novel written by Punathil Kunjabdulla in 1977. The story of the novel is woven around a mosque and its surroundings. The key figure is Khan Bahadur Pookkoya Thangal of the rich Arakkal family whose character is a rare mixture of dignity, benevolence and insatiable lust.

Smarakasilakal is widely regarded as the author's masterpiece. Punathil said in an interview that it is his only novel and everything else that he has written subsequently is a repetition of it with some changes. The novel won the Kerala Sahitya Akademi Award in 1978 and Sahitya Akademi Award in 1980. As of February 2013, more than 65,000 copies of the novel have been sold.

== Background ==
In his autobiography Nashtajathakam, Kunjabdulla recalls that the seeds of Smarakasilakal were sown at a screening of Satyajit Ray's Pather Panchali in Aligarh. The novel was conceived on a large canvas and developed from the images he had formed of his hometown and its people as a child in pre-independent Malabar. Most of the characters in this novel were real-life people he knew from his hometown.

== Plot summary ==
Smarakasilakal is set in a predominantly Muslim North Malabar village. It is the story of a feudal lord Khan Bahadur Pookkoya Thangal of the rich Arakkal family who could build a world of his own in his village. The mosque and its cemetery weave a background of traditions and legends for the tale. Every character reflects some aspect of the social set up, at the same time lives as a person of individuality. Thangal stands head and shoulders above every other character with his unbounded generosity and insatiable lust. The empire built by this man crumbles as he is killed by one of the young men whose wives he has ravished. The steward of the house grows into a tyrant. Thangal's daughter Pookunjeebi is sacrificed at the altar of wealth; his adopted son Kunjali burning for justice seems to place his trust on revolution as the only remedy for the ills that afflict society.

== Main characters ==
- Khan Bahadur Pookkoya Thangal - a feudal lord
- Kunjali - Thangal's adopted son
- Pookunjeebi - Thangal's daughter
- Attabeevi - Thangal's wife
- Kureishi Pathu - the chief maidservant
- Eramullan - muezzin in the mosque
- Bukhari - the security guard
- Buddhan Adraman - the hostler
- Pattalam Ibrayi - the caretaker of Arakkal family after Thangal's demise

== Translations ==
- Memorial Stones (English, Elzy Tharamangalam, Sahitya Akademi, 2003)
- Meesan Karkal (மீஸான் கற்கள்) (Tamil, Kulachal M.Yusaf, Kalachuvadu Pathipagam, 2004)
- Smaraka Silalu (స్మారక శిలలు) (Telugu, Nalimela Bhaskar, Sahitya Akademi, 2010)

== Adaptations ==
In 2009, a film adaptation of the novel was released, starring Jagathy Sreekumar as Pookkoya Thangal, and directed by M. P. Sukumaran Nair. The film is an entire re-depiction of the novel. Sukumaran Nair told in an interview: "I firmly believe that it is not the work of a director to literally translate a fiction into a film. Fiction should be modified to suit the entirely different medium of cinema." The film was critically acclaimed and won two Kerala State Film Awards: Second Best Film and Special Jury Award (Jagathy Sreekumar).

Also, All India Radio broadcast a play based on the novel through the programme Arangu in 2007.

== Awards ==
- 1978: Kerala Sahitya Akademi Award (Novel)
- 1980: Kendra Sahitya Akademi Award
- 2013: Kendra Sahitya Puraskar for the Telugu translation by Nalimela Bhaskar titled Smaraka Silalu
