= Drishtantham =

Drishtantham (The Vision)
- Directed by: M. P. Sukumaran Nair
- Written by: M. P. Sukumaran Nair
- Starring: Murali; Indrans; Margi Sathi; Rathya; Jijoy Rajagopal
- Cinematography: K. G. Jayan
- Edited by: B. Ajithkumar
- Music by: Chandran Veyattummal
- Release date: 2006
- Country: India
- Language: Malayalam

Drishtantham (English: The Vision) is a 2006 Malayalam film written and directed by M. P. Sukumaran Nair. The film is about an ailing theeyattu artist, who is trapped between tradition and the diktats of the new world. Murali plays the lead role of Vasunni. The film received wide critical acclaim and won numerous awards including the Kerala State Film Award for Best Film and National Film Award for Best Feature Film in Malayalam.

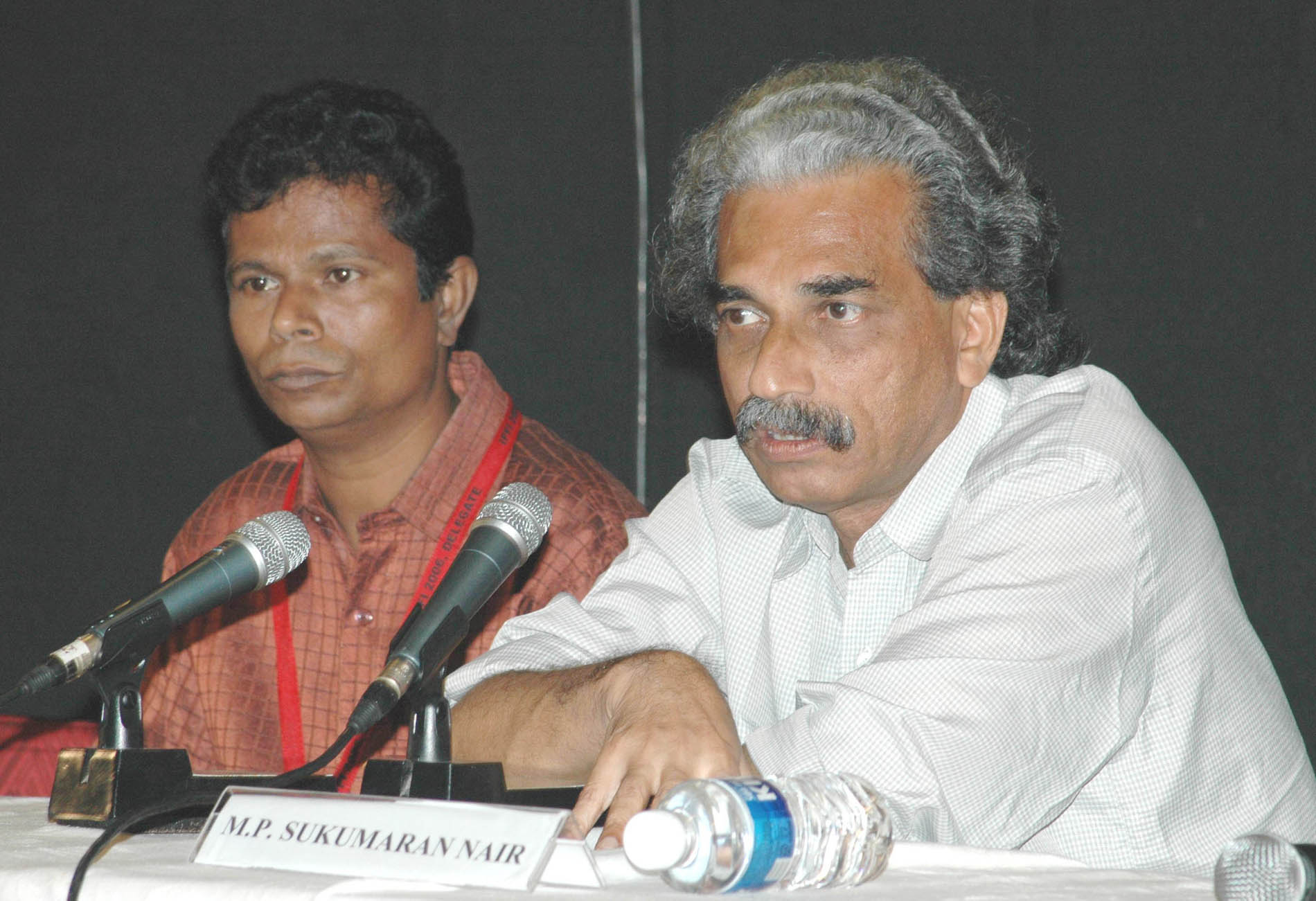
Indrans (left) and Sukumaran Nair (right) addressing a press conference about the film at Black Box, Kala Academy, at IFFI 2006

== Soundtrack ==
- "Chenthaasaayakaa" - Margi Sathi
- "Devi" - Pathanapuram Jose
- "Enthaanu Vallabhaa" - Margi Sathi
- "Mudiyettam (Daarikavadham)" - Pathanapuram Jose
- "Nalla Samayamithu" - Margi Sathi
- "Onnu Kandotte" - KV Selin
- "Paayeedum Thampuraane" - Sreenivasan Veyattummal
- "Rosham Undaakkuvaan" - Margi Sathi
- "Varanundu Varanundu" - Sreenivasan Veyattummal
