= Jalamsham =

2014 Indian-Malayalam language film

- Directed by: M. P. Sukumaran Nair
- Written by: M. P. Sukumaran Nair
- Produced by: M. P. Sukumaran Nair
- Starring: Jagadish; Manju Pillai
- Cinematography: K. G. Jayan
- Edited by: B. Ajithkumar
- Music by: Gemini Unnikrishnan
- Production company: Rachana Films
- Release date: 15 December 2014; (IFFK)
- Country: India
- Language: Malayalam

Jalamsham (transl. Water essence), also spelled as Jalamsam is a 2014 Indian Malayalam-language drama film written, produced and directed by M. P. Sukumaran Nair. The film stars Jagadish, Manju Pillai, Parvathy Ghosh, Indrans, Alencier Ley Lopez and Suraj Venjaramoodu. K. G. Jayan handles the cinematography and B. Ajithkumar edits the film. Gemini Unnikrishnan composed the songs and background score.

Jalamsham was officially premiered at International Film Festival of Kerala on 15 December 2014 under the category Malayalam Cinema Today.

== Plot ==
The film explores the socio-political changes in Kerala over a period of time. Kunjukunju, is a farmer and father of three girls. He cultivates on leased land, but is caught in the political turmoil of the time and ends up as a murderer. The film also explores his relationships with three women – Soshakutty, his wife, Savithri, his landlord, and Karumbi, a resilient peasant.

== Cast ==
- Jagadish as Kunjukunju
- Manju Pillai as Soshakutty
- Parvathy Ghosh as Savithri
- Reshmi as Karumbi
- Indrans
- Alencier Ley Lopez
- Suraj Venjaramoodu
- Krishna Prabha
- Avantika
- Professor Aliyar

== Soundtrack ==
Jalamsham

Soundtrack album by Gemini Unnikrishnan
- Studio: Dhwani Wave Station, Trivandrum
- Genre: Feature film soundtrack
- Length: 7:25

The soundtrack album of the film was composed by Gemini Unnikrishnan.

No.	Title	Lyrics	Singer(s)	Length
1.	"Deho Tho Ri"	Arpon Das	Sreekanth Hariharan	01:53
2.	"Ulakam Vayalakki"	Anwar Ali	Jayachandran Kadambanad, Anishya John, Nithin Raj, Unnikrishnan, Jayahari P. S., Gopika J. Nath	05:32
Total length:				07:25

== Release ==
Jalamsham was censored on 25 August 2014 and had its premiere at International Film Festival of Kerala on 15 December 2014 under the category Malayalam Cinema Today. The film was also screened at the Malabar Movie Festival on 15 March 2015 and Filca International Film Festival on 30 April 2015.
