= Vikas Oberoi =

Chairman and managing director – Oberoi Realty Limited

- Born: Mumbai, Maharashtra, India
- Citizenship: Indian
- Education: Jai Hind College, Harvard Business School
- Occupation: Entrepreneur
- Organization: Oberoi Realty Limited
- Title: Chairman and Managing Director
- Spouse: Gayatri Joshi (m. 2005)
- Children: 2

Vikas Oberoi is an Indian entrepreneur and the chairman and managing director of Oberoi Realty Limited. As of June 2026, his net worth is estimated at US$5.7 billion. He is also part of the Forbes World's Billionaires List 2026. He is married to Gayatri Joshi.

== Early life and background ==
Vikas Oberoi was born in 1969 in Mumbai, Maharashtra, to Ranvir and Santosh Oberoi. His father was a key figure in Mumbai’s real estate sector, beginning as an investor and later transitioning into real estate development. He became a prominent name in the industry by purchasing land and developing residential and commercial properties. Vikas grew up around the real estate business, and after completing his schooling, he joined his father’s office at Nariman Point.

Vikas pursued higher education at Jai Hind College in Mumbai and later attended Harvard Business School, where he completed the Owner/President Management programme.

== Career ==
Vikas Oberoi became involved in his father's business in the early 1990s, and eventually succeeded him. Under his leadership, Oberoi Realty Limited expanded significantly. He is known for acquiring large parcels of land and developing landmark projects, including the 60-acre former Novartis campus in Goregaon, Mumbai, and a four-acre plot in Worli from GlaxoSmithKline. These developments transformed the real estate landscape in Mumbai, featuring a mix of residential, commercial, and hospitality offerings.

In October 2024, under his leadership, Oberoi Realty launched Oberoi Garden City, Thane, a 75-acre integrated township project which recorded gross bookings of approximately ₹1348 crore within its first three days. Also, in 2025, Oberoi Realty announced its first project outside Mumbai with 14.81 acres land acquisition in Gurugram, Haryana for ₹597 crore.

== Awards and recognition ==
In 2010, Vikas Oberoi received the True Entrepreneur of the Year Award at the Economic Times ACETECH Awards. In 2018, he received the Best Successor – 2nd Generation award at the HT Mumbai Real Estate Awards. He was also ranked 908th on Forbes’ World’s Billionaires List - 2026, with an estimated net worth of $5.7 billion.
