= Punathil Kunjabdulla =

Indian writer

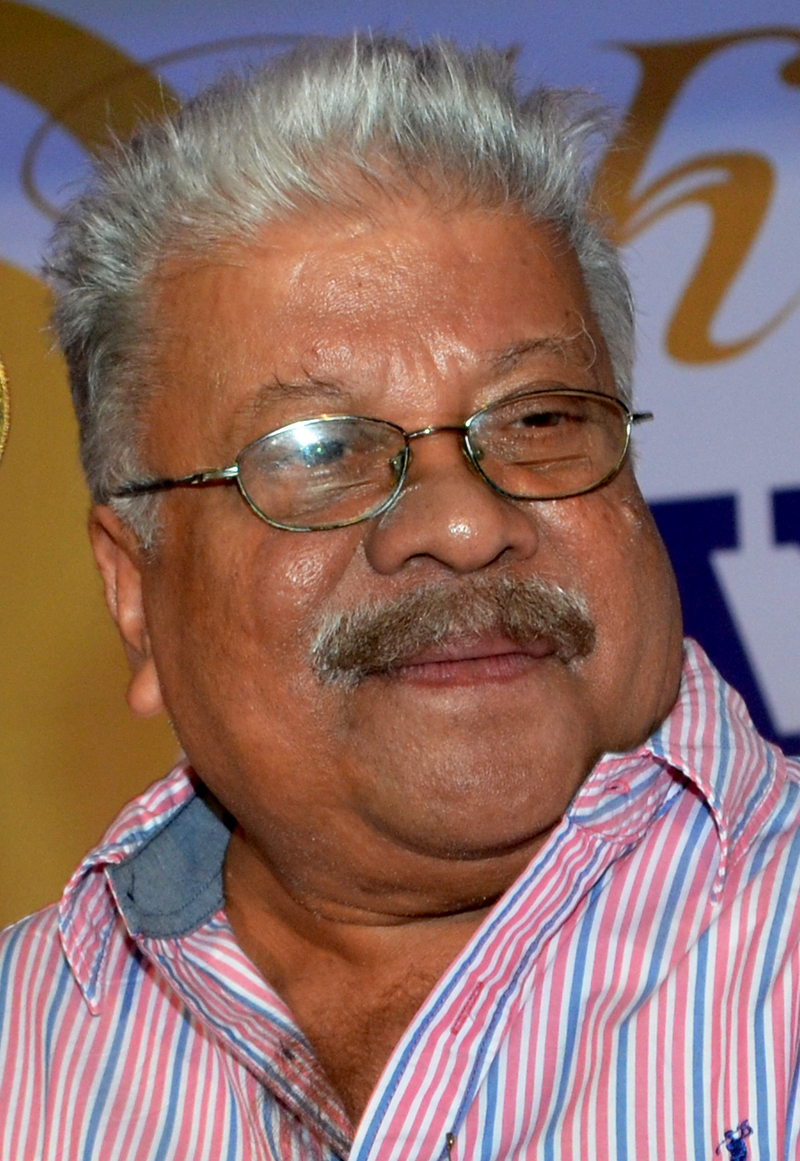
- Born: 3 April 1940; Vatakara, Malabar District, Madras Presidency, British India (present-day Kerala, India)
- Died: 27 October 2017 (aged 77); Calicut, Kerala, India
- Education: Brennen College, Thalassery; Aligarh Muslim University
- Occupations: Writer, medical practitioner
- Writing career
- Notable awards: Sahitya Akademi Award (1980); Kerala Sahitya Akademi Award (1978, 1980, 2001, 2010)

Punathil Kunjabdulla (3 April 1940 – 27 October 2017) was an Indian writer from Kerala. A medical doctor by profession, Kunjabdulla was a practitioner of the avant-garde in Malayalam literature. His work includes more than 45 books, including 7 novels, 15 short story collections, memoirs, an autobiography and travelogues. His work Smarakasilakal (Memorial Stones) won the Central and State Akademi Awards.

== Early and personal life ==
Kunjabdulla was born in 1940 in Karakkad near Onchiyam in Vatakara, Malabar District (present-day Kozhikode district, Kerala) as the son of C. K. Mammu and Saina, Kunjabdulla. He completed his primary education from Karakkad Mappila Lower Primary School and high school from Govt. Fisheries Technical School, Madappally. He joined Government Brennen College, Thalassery and completed his pre-degree and a bachelor's degree in science. He wanted to continue his studies at Brennen College and to do his masters in Malayalam. He was dissuaded by the late critic M. N. Vijayan, who was a teacher at the college's Department of Malayalam. "You don't have to do an MA to be a writer; all you need to know are the letters," his teacher advised him. He heeded the advice and went to the Aligarh Muslim University to study MBBS. He was a registered medical practitioner and served in government sector from 1970 to 1973 and at Vatakara from 1974 to 1976. He married Haleema and had three children. Kunjabdulla was living alone in a flat in Calicut during his last years.

Despite coming from a conservative Muslim background, Kunjabdulla was known for his wanton and unconventional life-style. He literally chose to celebrate life. Sethu once said: "His calibre to depict commoners was astonishing. With this magic, he could have written great works. However, he chose to celebrate life and did not care to write great works unlike many of his contemporaries. His lifestyle can be cited as the reason for this hindrance." Though he was born in a Muslim family, he never wanted to lead a religious life. He always described himself as a Hindu by culture, despite being born a Muslim. He liked alcohol and pork and never hesitated to admit it publicly.

In the 2001 Kerala assembly elections, Punathil unsuccessfully contested for Bharatiya Janata Party from Beypore constituency. He was pitted against industrialist-turned-politician V. K. C. Mammed Koya of the Communist Party of India (Marxist) and veteran politician M C Mayin Haji of the Indian Union Muslim League. He finished third, securing 10,934 votes. Kunjabdulla's decision to contest on BJP ticket was a surprise for many. He later said in an interview: "They were the first to offer me a ticket. If the Congress or the CPM had offered me a ticket first, I would have accepted it. It is my commitment to the people and not any kind of affinity towards any particular party, that inspires me."

Suffering from various ailments during his final years, he died at Baby Memorial Hospital in Calicut on 27 October 2017, aged 77. At the time of death, Punathil was working on an uncompleted novel titled Ya Ayyuhannas. The novel, centred around religion and spirituality, was announced almost a year before and was to be serialised in Madhyamam Weekly.

== Literary career ==
He sent his first short story Bhagyakuri (1958) to Mathrubhumi Illustrated Weekly while he was still at school, hoping to get published in the children's section. However its associate editor M. T. Vasudevan Nair chose to publish it in the general category. Kunjabdulla has called MT his only guru, both in life and writing.

Smarakasilakal (Memorial Stones), published in 1977, is set in a region near Vatakara where he grew up. The novel tells the story of Khan Bahadur Pookkoya Thangal, the head of a feudal family, and the patriarchal structure at work within the family.

Through the novel Marunnu (Medicine), which narrates the story on the life of MBBS students and of a medical college, Kunjabdulla introduced to Malayalam literature the world of hospitals and doctors. Paralokam also picked up on themes of death, another novel richly informed by his own life experiences as a doctor. He was a prolific writer of short stories as well. His story Kshethravilakkukal (Temple Lights) was chosen by M. Krishnan Nair in a collection of best short stories in the language. Kunjabdulla co-authored the novel Navagrahangulude Thadavara with Sethu. They discussed it together, wrote separately and then edited it together. According to Sethu, it was a work with a difference, though born ahead of the times.

The writer in Kunjabdulla had a great affinity towards Karakkad village in Vatakara where he was born. Many of his stories were reflections of his village and the characters like Vandikkaran Kunjhan, Bappu Kanaran, Moosa Musaliyar and Sankarakurup were real life people in his village. The years he spent at Aligarh also left deep impressions on Kunjabdulla. He was known as Aligadhinte Kathakaran as he introduced Aligarh in Malayalam literature. As an MBBS student, he spent 9 years in Aligarh Muslim University (1962-1970) and during his stay at Room No. 31 at VM Hal of AMU, he would write short stories on Aligarh and publish them in Malayalam journals. His experiences in the Uttar Pradesh city helped him write some of his most widely read short stories. Aligadhile Tadavukaran (The Prisoner in Aligarh), Marunnu (Medicine), Aligadh Kathakal (Aligarh Stories) are some of the famous books on Aligarh that he wrote. Cycle Savairi (Cycle Riding), Jeevachavangal (Living Cadavers) MoulanaInam Khureshi, Kathi (Knife), Velichaththinte Maranam (Death of Light) and Smasanathilekku Nayikkunna Njan (Leading by me Towards the Graveyard) are some of the most known short stories on his Aligarh days.

Like Pookunjeebi in Smarakasilakal many of his female characters were strong personalities. Instead of depicting women in moodily love, he celebrated lust, passion of love and beauty through his women characters. The women characters in Kure Sthreekal, Pranaya Kathakal and Ente Kamukimarum Mattu Kathakalum represented life as it is and the underlying tone was lust.

== Awards ==
- Kendra Sahitya Akademi Award (Malayalam) (1980) – for Smarakasilakal
- Kerala Sahitya Akademi Award for Novel (1978) – for Smarakasilakal
- Kerala Sahitya Akademi Award for Story (1980) – for Malamukalile Abdulla
- Kerala Sahitya Akademi Award for Travelogue (2001) – for Volgayil Manju Peyyumbol
- Kerala Sahitya Akademi Fellowship (2010)
- Muttathu Varkey Award (1999)
- Mathrubhumi Literary Award (2013)
- Vishwadeepam Award – for Marunnu

== Selected works ==
=== Novels ===
- Smarakasilakal (DC Books, 1977)
- Marunnu (DC Books)
- Paralokam (DC Books)
- Punathilinte Novellakal (DC Books)
- Kanyavanangal (DC Books)
- Navagrahangulude Thadavara (with Sethu) (DC Books)
- Agnikinavukal (DC Books)
- Ammaye Kaanan (Children's novel, Mathrubhumi Books)
- Kannadi Veedukal (Trichur Current Books, 2001)

=== Short stories ===
- Aligarh Kathakal (Mathrubhumi Books, 2012)
- Ente Priyapetta Kathakal (DC Books)
- Kshethravilakkukal (Mathrubhumi Books)
- Kure Sthreekal (Mathrubhumi Books)
- Malamukalile Abdulla (Mathrubhumi Books, 1974)
- Marichupoya Ente Appanammamarkku (Poorna Publications, 1997)
- Neelaniramulla Thottam
- Pranaya Kathakal (Mathrubhumi Books)
- Punathilinte 101 Kathakal
- Ente Kamukimarum Mattu Kathakalum
- Kathi (Mathrubhumi Books)

=== Others ===
- Atmaviswasam Valiya Marunnu (memoirs & essays, Mathrubhumi Books)
- Kaippunyam Athava Chila Adukkalakkaryangal (cookery, Mathrubhumi Books)
- Nashtajaathakam (autobiography, DC Books)
- Puthiya Marunnum Pazhaya Manthravum (memoirs, Mathrubhumi Books)
- Randaam Chemmeen (memoirs, Manorama Books, 2012)
- Volgayil Manju Peyyumbol (travelogue, Mathrubhumi Books)
