= M. P. Sukumaran Nair =

Indian director and producer

M. P. Sukumaran Nair is an Indian film director and producer, working in Malayalam film industry. He is an alumnus of the Film and Television Institute of India.

He has won both national and Kerala state film awards, multiple times, and is considered one of the prominent Malayalam filmmakers. He produced and directed Aparahnam (1991), Kazhakam (1995), Shayanam (2000), Drishtantham (2006), Raamanam (2009), and Jalamsham (2014).

His films won two National Awards for the best film in Malayalam: Shayanam in 2000, and Drishtantham in 2006.

Kazhakam and Drishtantham also won the Best Film award at the Kerala State Film Awards. Aparahnam and Raamanam won the award for second best film. Nair won the best screenplay award for Shayanam in 2000.

Urvashi got the award for the best actress at the Kerala State Film Awards for Kazhakam in 1995.
