= Suma Josson =

Indian-American journalist and filmmaker

Suma Josson is an Indian-American journalist and filmmaker. Her documentary film Niyamgiri, You are still alive, on the ecological and human damage done by bauxite mining, won a first prize in the Short Film, Environment category at the 2010 International Film Festival of India.

== Life ==
She was born in Kerala, India and graduated in English Literature from the University of Minnesota, United States. She began her career as a journalist at Press Trust of India, and in 1992 switched over to the visual media. She has made a number of documentary films. She has published three books: Poems and Plays, A Harvest of Light (a collection of plays), and Circumferences (a novel).

== Films ==
=== 1998 – Janmadinam (The Birthday) - Malayalam ===
Sarasu has come to the hospital to deliver her baby. Amma, her mother, is with her, to assist her. The actual time-span of the film is a single night which the mother and the daughter spend at the hospital. Sarasu, a TV-reporter working in Bombay, keeps a diary into which she pours her inner-most feelings. We find out that Sarasu was forced by her father to marry Raghu, although she was in love with Ajay, a cameraman. A few months after her marriage, she passes through Bombay to join her husband. On the way, she meets Ajay in his flat. This is during the '1993 communal violence in Bombay. In the aftermath of this meeting, Sarasu is finally forced to make a choice. And Amma realizes that she also has to take a stand, as a result of Sarasu's choice. It is this unspoken, unseen, subtle tension between mother and daughter, and a slow psychological unfolding of the personal histories of the main characters, which form the content of this film.

- Direction & Screenplay: Suma Josson
- Cast: Nandita Das, Surekha Sikhri
- Cinematography: Hari Nair
- Music: Narayana Mani

=== 1999 – Saree - Malayalam ===
Two children, Gita and Radha, are stranded in the no man's land between two worlds that dominate contemporary childhood: school and home. This in-between land is one of myriad dreams, fears, and fantasies all yearning to take the shape of a free fluid space where children can summon whichever spirit they like. The two young friends are on their way back from the school as they recount their dreams in this subliminal space available only to childhood.

Saree was selected for the 1999 Berlin Festival, and in 2000 it was the inaugural film at the Mumbai International Film Festival in Mumbai.

- Direction & Screenplay: Suma Josson
- Cast: : Remya, Krishna, Nedumudi Venu, Sreelatha, Priyanka
- Cinematography: M J Radhakrishnan, K G Jayan
- Editing: Bina
- Music: Chandran Veyattumal

=== Gujarat: A Laboratory Of Hindu Rastra, Fascism ===
Set in the post-Godhra violence which was unleashed in Gujarat during February 2002, this film examines the extent to which the fascist ideologies of the communal forces have infiltrated into the sub-conscious of an ordinary Gujarati Hindu.

2003 / documentary / 50 min / English subtitles

== See also ==
- Women's Cinema
