= Amar Singh (Uttar Pradesh politician) =

Indian politician (1956–2020)

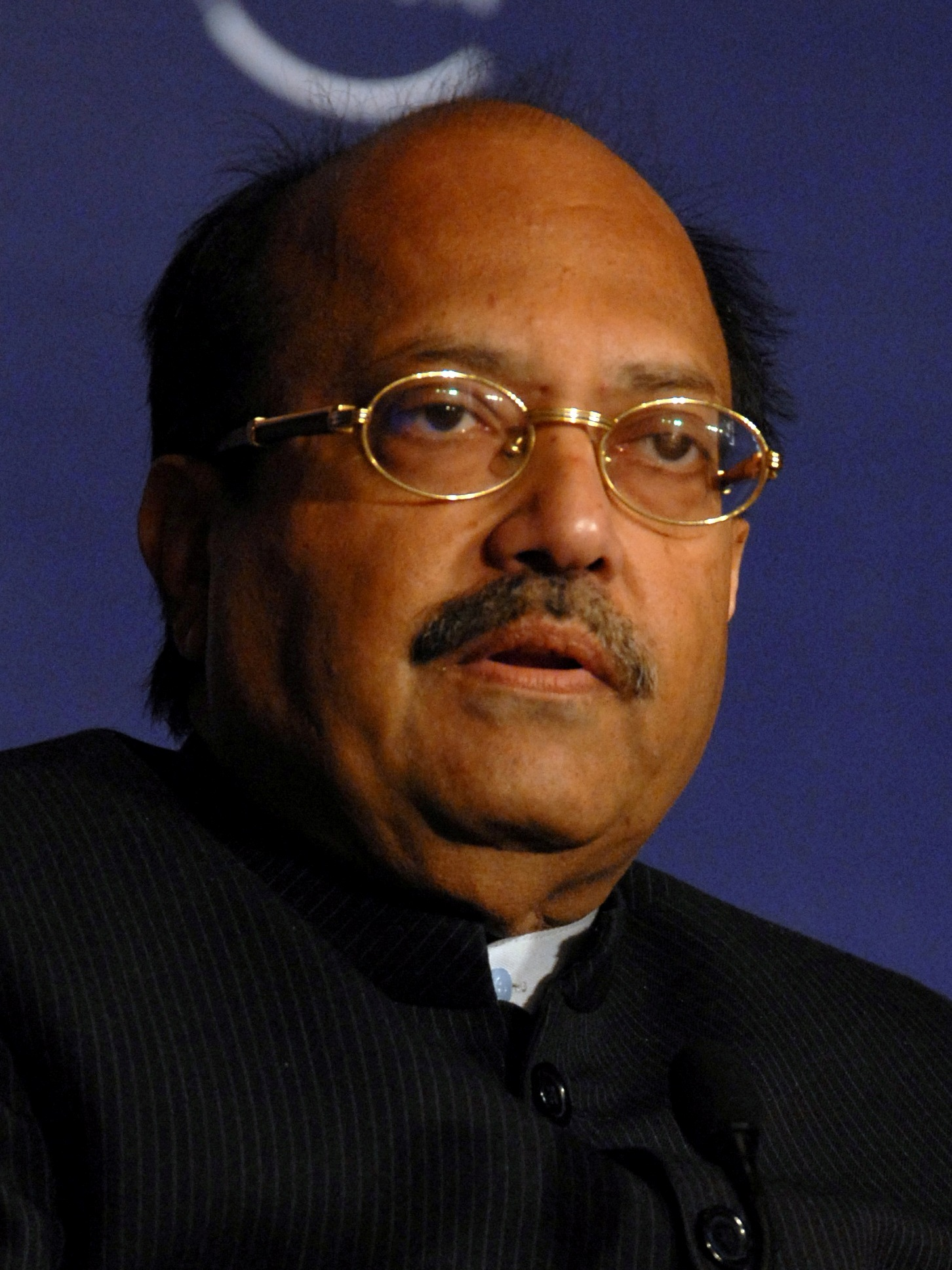
- Singh speaking at the World Economic Forum's India Economic Summit 2008.

Member of Parliament, Rajya Sabha
- In office 26 November 1996 – 25 November 2014
- Constituency: Uttar Pradesh
- In office 5 July 2016 – 1 August 2020
- Preceded by: Ambeth Rajan
- Succeeded by: Syed Zafar Islam
- Constituency: Uttar Pradesh

Personal details
- Born: 27 January 1956 Azamgarh, Uttar Pradesh, India
- Died: 1 August 2020 (aged 64) Singapore
- Party: Independent
- Other political affiliations: Samajwadi Party; Rashtriya Lok Dal
- Spouse: Pankaja Kumari Singh (m. 1987–2020)
- Children: 2 daughters
- Education: University of Calcutta
- Profession: Politician

Amar Singh (27 January 1956 – 1 August 2020) was an Indian politician from the state of Uttar Pradesh. He was the general secretary of the Samajwadi Party and a member of the Rajya Sabha, the upper house of the Indian parliament.

On 6 January 2010, he resigned from all the posts of the Samajwadi Party and was later expelled from the party by its chief, Mulayam Singh Yadav, on 2 February 2010, for disagreement with Yadav on the Women's Reservation Bill. In 2011, he was arrested and spent a brief period in jail for alleged involvement in the cash-for-votes scandal. In 2016, he was elected to Rajya Sabha with support from Samajwadi Party even after facing a stiff opposition from a section of the party including the then Chief Minister of Uttar Pradesh Akhilesh Yadav (Mulayam's son). Amar Singh was also reinstated as one of the general secretaries of the party in October 2016. On 1 August 2020, Singh died of a kidney ailment in Singapore at the age of 64.

== Early life ==
Amar Singh was born on 27 January 1956 at Azamgarh, Uttar Pradesh to a Bais Rajput family. He got his early education at his native place. Afterwards, his family moved to Kolkata where he completed his graduation from St. Xavier's College and his law education from University College of Law, Kolkata.

Singh started his career as a liaison officer of K. K. Birla, then owner of Hindustan Times. Working with Birla, he made inroads in journalist fraternity.

== Political career ==
Singh's prominence in Delhi surged when the UPA government was reduced to a minority after the Communist Party of India, Communist Party of India (Marxist) and All India Forward Bloc withdrew their support over the proposed Nuclear Accord with the United States. His Samajwadi Party pledged support to the UPA government with the support of its 39 members.

Singh along with his close associate Jaya Prada were expelled from the Samajwadi Party in February 2010 for anti party activities. On 21 December 2010, Singh launched his official website and blog.

Singh floated his own political party, Rashtriya Lok Manch, in 2011, and fielded candidates in 360 of the 403 seats in Uttar Pradesh in the 2012 assembly polls. However his party did not win a single seat in these elections. He joined the Rashtriya Lok Dal party in March 2014, contested the general elections that year from Fatehpur Sikri, Uttar Pradesh in 2014 Indian general election and lost.

He was admitted at a hospital in Dubai with kidney failure and was stated to be critical on 19 February 2013.

== Positions held ==
Amar Singh has been elected 4 times as Rajya Sabha MP. He had lost the 16th Lok Sabha election from Fatehpur Sikri in 2014 as RLD candidate.

#	From	To	Position	Party
1.	1996	2002	MP (1st term) in Rajya Sabha from Uttar Pradesh	SP
2.	2002	2008	MP (2nd term) in Rajya Sabha from Uttar Pradesh	SP
3.	2008	2014	MP (3rd term) in Rajya Sabha from Uttar Pradesh	SP
4.	2016	2020	MP (4th term) in Rajya Sabha from Uttar Pradesh (died in 2020)	Ind

Note: Elected to Rajya Sabha in 2016 from Uttar Pradesh as an independent member by the support of Samajwadi Party (SP).

== Personal life ==
Amar Singh had married Pankaja Kumari Singh on 14 June 1987 and the couple have 2 daughters: Drishti Singh and Disha Singh.

== Controversies ==
On 22 July 2008, he accused Uttar Pradesh Chief Minister Mayawati of kidnapping six MPs of his party from Uttar Pradesh and holding them captive in Uttar Pradesh Bhavan, New Delhi. Later, Samajwadi Party expelled the six MPs for defying the party directive during the confidence motion voting.

He also courted controversy by asking for a probe in the Jamia Nagar Batla house encounter case. First he gave ₹10 lakh cheque to the family of Mohan Chand Sharma, a police officer who died in the encounter, which bounced when checked for its validity. Later he asked for a judicial enquiry into the firing incidence suggesting that the encounter may have been fake. Mohan Chand Sharma's family criticized him and returned his money.

Amar Singh has been chargesheeted for offering bribes to three parliament members of the Bharatiya Janata Party in 2008 under the Prevention of Corruption Act by the Delhi Police on 24 August 2011. Amar Singh has pleaded health grounds for not appearing before the courts where the chargesheet was being heard. However, distressed by adverse media reports, Singh has appeared before the courts to dispel allegations that he is running away from the process of law. After hearing his personal pleas, the Court has sent Singh to judicial custody till 19 September 2011, in Delhi's Tihar jail. But the money trail in this scandal was not traced to Amar Singh's account as per Supreme Court order and nor concrete evidence could be found against him.

=== 2011 tapes controversy ===
Amar Singh had filed a petition in 2006 after some of his telephone conversations were illegally tapped and were in circulation. A man named Anurag Singh was arrested in the case. The leader had moved the apex court and got a restraint order against their publication in the media. In May 2011, the Supreme Court of India removed the stay on publishing the taped conversations with Bollywood star including Bipasha Basu.

=== Clinton Cash ===
In reference to the book Clinton Cash, the New York Post questioned Singh's $5 million contribution to the Clinton Foundation, writing "Singh’s donation was treated with suspicion and amusement in India."

== Films ==
Amar Singh acted in many films including a small role in Hamara Dil Aapke Paas Hai and the role of a politician in the film JD. He also acted in a Malayalam-language film Bombay Mittayi in 2011.

Year	Title	Role
2000	Hamara Dil Aapke Paas Hai	Himself
2011	Bombay Mittayi	Mallika Mansoor
2016	A Trip to Unicorn Island	Himself
2017	JD	Politician

Apne(2007) as Himself

== Death ==
Amar Singh died on 1 August 2020 at the age of 64 in Singapore due to kidney failure.
