= Madhukar Dhumal =

- Also known as: Tatya, Madhu
- Born: Madhukar; 2 February 1960 (age 66)
- Origin: Mumbai, Maharashtra, India
- Genres: Hindustani classical music, jazz fusion, world music
- Occupation: Shehnai maestro
- Instrument: Shehnai
- Years active: 1970–present
- Labels: SONY, T-Series, Saregama,
- Website: www.madhukardhumal.com

Madhukar Dhumal is an Indian shehnai player, composer, and freelance musician. He is a disciple of Guni Gandharva Pandit Laxmanprasad Jaipurwale and Pandit Rajaram Sukhla. Madhukar plays in many other bands, performing with various artists worldwide and for Bollywood with many music directors.

== Early life ==
Madhukar Tukaram Dhumal was born to the musicians Tukaram and Chandrabai Dhumal in Satara, Maharashtra. His father taught him shehnai when he was young.

== Career ==
Madhukar is a shehnai player with proficiency in Hindustani Classical Music, Ragdhari style of Jaipur Gharana, and Banaras Gharana under intensive teachings from Guni Gandharava Pandit Laxmanprasad Jaipurwale and Pandit Rajaram Shukla, a composer and performer. Madhukar is a master of Khayal Gayaki and Tatkari.

Madhukar's renditions in music concerts throughout India have received accolades from the press.

Madhukar is a graded artist (B-high) of All India Radio and his renditions are regularly broadcast by AIR and doordarshan. He has rendered music for many music directors of film, industry, and TV serials. His performances have been aired by Sony Entertainment Television.

He has played for many Bollywood movies with well-known music directors Laxmikant–Pyarelal for Saudagar 1991, Rajesh Roshan for Koyla, A. R. Rahman for Swades, Lagaan, Ismail Darbar for Devdas, Hum Dil De Chuke Sanam, M. M. Keeravani for Paheli, Anu Malik for Refugee, Amit Trivedi for Dev D, Ram Sampath for Fukrey, pritam chakraborty for Action Replayy.

== Personal life ==
Madhukar Dhumal is married to Nisha Dhumal and currently lives with his daughter and son in Mumbai.

== Performances ==
- 66th Sawai Gandharva Bhimsen Festival 2017.
- 61st Sawai Gandharva Bhimsen Festival in 2013 (Pune) opening rendition of concert.
- Sangeet Samrat Ustad Alladiya Khan Saheb Mohatsav 2013 Murham SangeetRatna AbdulKarim Khan Saheb 79 th Punyatithi Samaroh.
- At Bandish a concert organised in memory of tabla nawaz late Ustad Amir Hussain KhanSaheb in Mumbai.
- At Gurupurnima celebration (2003) at the Taj in Mumbai 24' Ragas - 24 hrs' concert under aegis of Acharya Jialal Vasant Sangeet Niketan, Juhu and Times Foundation.
- At NCPA - Mumbai for the concert organised by H.A Trust.
- At the '50 hrs, Non - Stop' Indian Classical Music concert (Swarankur) with the inaugural and opening rendition of the concert.
- At cultural events organized by Government of Maharashtra on days of national importance and at inaugural functions.

== Discography ==
- 1998 Parinay Shekhar Sen
- 1998 Ok Talvin Singh
- 1999 Divinity - Divine Music for Meditation Ashit Desai
- 2000 Indian Beyond Remo Fernandes
- 2000 Rimayer Ziskakan
- 2001 African Fantasy Trilok Gurtu
- 2001 Trinity - Music of Gods Ashit Desai
- 2002 Bombay Bliss - A Unique Instrumental Music Experience of Ever-green Melodies Ashit Desai
- 2003 Heeyam Shye Ben Tzur
- 2013 Alchemy (EP) Bandish Projekt
