= Nakharam =

- Nakharam theatrical poster
- Directed by: T. Deepesh
- Written by: Dr. Valsalan Vadhussery
- Produced by: Ismail V.C.
- Starring: Ganesh Kumar; Architha
- Cinematography: Sinu
- Edited by: Viji Abraham
- Music by: Paris Chandran; Dr. Prasanth Krishnan
- Distributed by: VCI Release
- Release date: 7 January 2011
- Country: India
- Language: Malayalam

Nakharam (English: The Claw) is a 2011 Malayalam film directed by T. Deepesh starring Ganesh Kumar, Architha, Madhupal, Mamukkoya, Jose Thettayil and Sreeletha. Written by Valasalan Vadhussery and produced by Ismail V. C., the film released in Kerala on 7 January 2011. Jose Thettayil, the current Minister for Transport in the Government of Kerala, played the role of a judge in the film. It was the first DSLR feature film in India.

== Cast ==
- Ganesh Kumar
- Architha
- Madhupal
- Mamukkoya
- Jose Thettayil
- Sreeletha
