= Ek Alag Mausam =

- Directed by: K. P. Sasi
- Written by: Mahesh Dattani; Sushma Ahuja
- Starring: Nandita Das; Anupam Kher; Renuka Shahane
- Cinematography: M. J. Radhakrishnan
- Edited by: B. Ajithkumar
- Music by: Ravi
- Production company: Penta Enterprise
- Distributed by: Action Aid India
- Release date: 3 January 2003
- Running time: 120 minutes
- Country: India
- Language: Hindi

Ek Alag Mausam (English: A Different Season) is a 2003 Hindi movie directed by K. P. Sasi with Nandita Das, Anupam Kher and Rajit Kapur in the lead roles. Renuka Shahane, Arundathi Nag, Sreelatha and Sally Dynevor are in the supporting roles. The film entered production in 1999 and was shot in Vagamon.

== Plot ==
Aparna Verma (Nandita Das), who has been married to a travelling salesman Suresh for several years, is now pregnant. After she completes some medical tests, she is asked to come see the doctor along with her husband. Suresh refuses to go. Aparna goes alone, and this is where she receives the news that she has AIDS and she must abort the child. Aparna subsequently learns that Suresh has been having unprotected sex with other women, had acquired AIDS, and passed it on to her. She confers with her mother, finds out about a rehabilitation house called "Jivan Jyoti," and goes there to volunteer without telling anyone about her condition. She meets with Dr. Machado (Anupam Kher), who informs her that he is aware of her condition but promises not to tell anyone else. Now divorced, Aparna feels herself getting attracted to another worker, George (Rajit Kapur), who is a truck driver and also works in Jivan Jyoti. George is very friendly with the children of Jivan Jyoti. But the knowledge of her being HIV positive restrains her from getting too friendly with him. She learns that he too is HIV positive. She avoids him and mixes with the children. A prostitute Rita (Renuka Shahane) and her young daughter Paro are brought to Jivan Jyoti. Rita passes away, leaving Paro in the care of Aparna. George leaves Jivan Jyoti feeling shunned by Aparna, but only after disposing of his truck and garage and donating the proceeds for the development of Jivan Jyoti. Aparna takes Paro to a boarding school for admission, where she meets George after a long time. They unite with the help of Dr. Machado.

== Cast ==
- Nandita Das – Aparna Suresh Verma
- Rajit Kapoor – George
- Anupam Kher – Dr. Machado
- Renuka Shahane – Rita
- Sally Dynevor – Social worker
- Arundathi Nag – Aparna's mother
- Ajith Hande - Suresh Verma
- Yash Joshi
- Harish Raju
- Anuradha Rao
- Tanaya Joshi
- Babu Annur
- Gargi Vegiraju
- Ramakrishna
- Nanda Kumar
- Sreelatha
- Anant Kumar
- Bharat Gopy – George's father
- Kishori Ballal
- Arjun R.
- Manshad C. V.
- Rakesh Sharma
- Nihal Rao
- Baburaj P.
- Satheesh Poduval
- Munira Sen
- Lakshmi
- Varsha

== Music ==
The music was scored by Ravi and the songs were written by Kaifi Azmi and Sushma Ahuja.

1. "Har Taraf" - Anuradha Paudwal
2. "Safe Sex" - Nalin Dave, Mohini Singh
3. "Tara Rum Pum" - Anupam Kher, Usha Krishnadas
4. "Thoda Pyar Thodi Hansi" - Nalin Dave
5. "Uski Baari Jo Thi" - Hariharan
6. "Usko Paane Se Pehle" (Female) - Anuradha Paudwal
7. "Usko Paane Se Pehle" (Male) - Hariharan
