= Biju C. Kannan =

Indian film director

Biju C. Kannan is an Indian film director who works in Malayalam films.

== Filmography ==
- 2004 - Chayam
- 2007 - Thadha
- 2009 - Sakshi
- 2012 - Kadha mouna mozhi
- 2014 - Iruvazhi Thiriyunnidam
