= Deepak Haldankar =

Indian film director and cinematographer (born 1947)

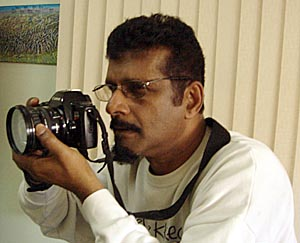
Deepak Haldankar

Deepak Haldankar (born 17 December 1947) is an Indian film director and cinematographer. He was the first Indian director cinematographer to shoot 35mm Eastmancolor films in Antarctica. The film "Exploration Antarctica" won an award at the Toulon Maritime film festival, France, in 1987. He covered two Mount Everest expeditions in 1984 and 1985. He won national awards for a film about the Indian Mount Everest expeditions in 1984, featuring the first Indian woman to climbed Mount Everest (Bachendri Pal).

== Early life and education ==
Haldankar was born on 17 December 1947 at Dharwad, Karnatak State and brought up in Mumbai, India.

== Career ==
He photographed his first films in 1970 "The Flying Sikh -Milkha Singh","Arming the Mountains" directed by S.P. Ganguli produced by Films Division Government of India. Compiled Kailash Mansarovar Yatra film for Swami Amar Jotijee, photographed "Kalakar Namaskar" Tribute to Great Indian Masters series on RajaRaviVerma, M.F.Hussen, Kulkarni, Laxman Pai, Soza, Dave, Aparna Kaur, S.K.Arayan and many others produced and directed by Chandramani Kohli for Doordarshan. Photographed "Gift of Love" a film on dowry deaths directed by Meera Dewan for Films Division won eleven international awards. Some of the important films photographed are A Day With Prime Minister Mrs Indira Gandhi and M.N.Roy. Photographed 35mm Eastman colour film (biographical film) on the Life of "Kavi Neeraj" the songwriter, who wrote 125 songs and out of which 120 were super hit in the Indian cinema. This film was directed by Gurbir Singh Grewal for Films Division Government of India.

A film directed and photographed on Shri. Bhavarlal Jain, Padmashree & Dr.Tony Vohra, MBE both started and now own industrial empires in Jalgon, India and UK.

Worked with Dr. Alok Adholeya, Head of the mycorrhiza department, director, Biotechnology & Management of Bioresources Division The Energy and Resources Institute (TERI) New Delhi, India, on their mycorrhiza project at Korba. Directed and photographed many films on organic cultivation for Dr.Tony Vohra. Eastend Foods, England, Shri Mukesh Gupta, Executive Director, Morarka Foundation, which works in the rural areas in the field of organic farming, Jaipur, Rajasthan.

Haldankar covered two Indian army rafting expeditions on the river Ganges led by Major D.N. Das in 1982 and covered Hovercraft expedition, went upstream on the Ganges led by Dr. Michel Peissel of France in 1979 – 1980.

He covered two motorcycle expeditions (Bajajmotorcycles )to Siachin base camp. He covered thousands of news stories for Indian News Review in India and abroad and hundreds of documentary films on 35mm Eastmancolor. He represented India with the film Where time stands still to Leipzig, Bilbao and Warsaw. Haldankar visited 87 countries for film making and directed and photographed number of serials for various channels. He worked with director Michael Antoniou for a film on Kumbh Mela in 1975 and on the 70mm multi-screen project "Sukhirama" for S. Sukhdev in 1972 for Asia-72. His film Mala Laj Nahi I am Not Ashamed the film directed and photographed a documentary film duration 16 minutes 4 seconds produced by Dhruvee Haldankar for Filmsmith's Productions got National Award India 2016. This film depicts the hardship women of Khar-Danda, Mumbai India face for want of toilets. They go out in the open on the sea front with just the cover of an umbrella, have to wait for hours together for the sea tide to recede. Dignity, Hygiene Made Affordable Worldwide produced by Dhruvee Haldankar for Filmsmith's Productions a film on sanitary napkins introduced by Swati Bedeker. Photographed Isha a film on social evils, produced by Kekra Entertainment, directed by Keshav Raina. A film by Bipin Chaubal on ambidextrous persons.

Haldankar started his career working in feature films with producer and cinematographer, the late Nariman A. Irani, assisting him in Talash, Maharaja, Balidan & Pakazeea. Haldankar worked with cinematographers Anwar Siraj, Joe D'souza, A Salam and Dara Engineer. Haldankar photographed five episodes of Kab Tak for TV India. Telugu serials Talli Prema, Saraswati Namasthubyam, Friends for Abhinav Arts. Directed Corporate film for Dr.Tony Whora, MBE Eastend Foods UK, and was declared as the best cinematographer for 2008, September 2010 by the Journalist Association of India, New Delhi. Haldankar is a member of the Western India Cinematographer's Association Grade –I (no 2215) and a member of the Working News Cameraman's Association, the largest body of working photojournalists engaged in visual media, accredited with Press Information Bureau, Government of India I-card No 1640, New Delhi. Deepak Haldankar is working with production house Harikrit Films, New Delhi-India as Chief Strategist.

== Notes ==
- "Deepak Haldanker, WICA Producer / Director / Cinematographer". Mountkailash.com. Archived from the original on 6 February 2009.
- "10th Mumbai International Film Festival" (PDF). Mumbai International Film Festival. 4 February 2008. Archived from the original (PDF) on 21 July 2011.
- "Harikrit Films > Our Team". Harikrit Films Delhi. Archived from the original on 23 June 2010.
- humanbase (29 October 2007). "Deepak Haldankar". Deepakhaldankardelhibase.blogspot.com. Archived from the original on 8 July 2011.
- "Some Delhibase Artists (DelhiBase)".
- "Deepak Haldankar". In.linkedin.com.
- Documentary Today – 60 years of Films Division – May 2008.
- "Exploring the Frozen Continent" by Deepak Haldankar, pages 43 to 49. Worked as News Reel Officer in Delhi and covered news stories for "Indian Newsreview" all over the globe. He has been part of several dangerous missions and photographed and directed many adventure films.
- "Rafting Down the Ganges"- Exclusive first hand account by Maj. D.N. DASS the leader of the expedition published in Gentlemen's Fashion Quarterly Aug–Oct 1982 issue pages 70 to 74. on page 73 it is mentioned " Haldankar had to be rescued from a cliff, to which he was hanging for dear life ------------together with his camera and equipment. On page 74 " In conclusion, a special word for Deepak Haldankar .He not only filmed the voyage, but was constantly involved with the activities of the expedition--------from administration to rescue work .A tribute to a civilian member who went beyond his call of duty all the time. The film made by him has captured actual disaster and adventure shots which doubtless will earn him many laurels.”

Articles on Deepak Haldankar published in various newspapers and magazines.

- "For Deepak, it was dream come true"--------- Morning Echo Friday 29 April 1977 page 5. New Delhi.
- The World is His Playground ---- screen, August 6;1993 PAGE 17.
- "From the swirling sand dunes of the Thar to the rarefied heights of the freezing environs of the Antarctic, cinematographer Deepak Haldankar has made the World his playground.”
- "Where Time Stands Still" a film division production DAVP catalogue year of production 1978, date of release 24 March 1978. Govt of India {F.No201/78}
- "After the Raj"------by Hugh Purcell, Yorkshire UK. Sutton Publishing
- "In Focus "Ready Aim Shoot"----------Shubhadarshini Singh. Sunday Mail, 16–22 September 1990
