= K. P. Sasi =

Indian film director and cartoonist (1958–2022)

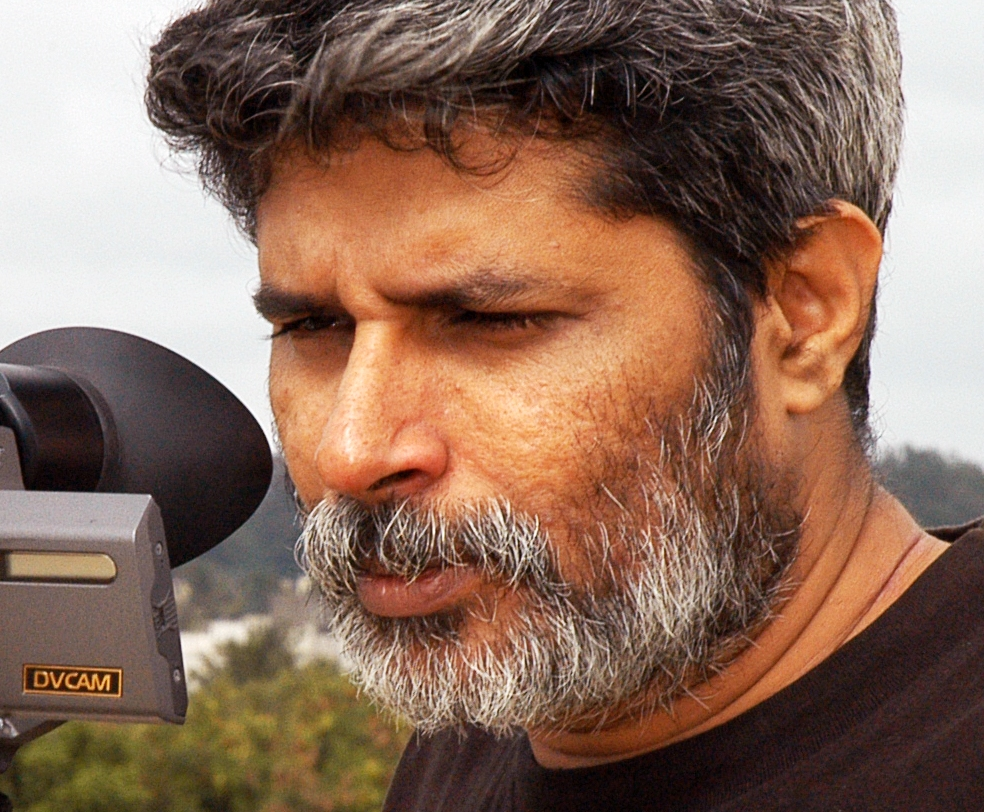
- Died: 25 December 2022 (aged 64); Thrissur, Kerala, India
- Occupations: Film director and cartoonist

Karuvannur Puthanveettil Sasi (Malayalam: കെ. പി. ശശി; 14 March 1958 – 25 December 2022) was an Indian film director and cartoonist from Bengaluru.

== Life and career ==
Sasi started working as a cartoonist while being a student at JNU during the late seventies. He started experimenting with films on 8mm during the early eighties. His documentaries include A Valley Refuses to Die, We Who Make History, Living in Fear, In the Name of Medicine, Voices from a Disaster, Fabricated!, America America, Resisting Coastal Invasion and Development at Gunpoint.

His feature films include Ilayum Mullum, on the social and psychological violence on women in Kerala. Ek Alag Mausam (A Different Season) (Hindi: एक अलग मौसम) is a 2003 Hindi language movie directed by Sasi and starring Nandita Das, Anupam Kher, Renuka Shahane, Rajit Kapur, Arundathi Nag, Sreelatha and Sally Whittaker. Ssh..Silence Please is a silent comedy film on development.

Sasi died in Thrissur, Kerala, on 25 December 2022, at the age of 64.

As part of the Kerala State Chalachitra Academy’s Smrithianjali series, the book The Third Eye of Human Rights, edited by Mustafa Desamangalam, presents the life story of Sasi.

== Filmography ==
=== As director ===
- 1998 – Ek Alag Mausam
- 1991 – Ilayum Mullum
- 2008 - Silence Please
