= Vishnu Nandan =

- Born: Vishnu Nandan; Mattancherry, Kerala
- Citizenship: India
- Education: SH College, Thevara, Ernakulam
- Occupation: Cinematographer
- Years active: 2012 – present

Vishnu Nandan is an Indian cinematographer who has worked in Malayalam films. He made his debut in 2021 Tamil movie called Roommate.

== Early and personal life ==
Vishnu Nandan was born at Mattancherry, in Ernakulam district of Kerala state. His parents are P G Ramesan and R Geetha. Since his father worked in different branches of Canara Bank, Vishnu Nandan completed schooling in various schools across the country. After completing studies at Sacred Heart College, Kochi, he did a one-year Diploma in Digital Cinematography from Cochin Media School (then run by Director Siby Malayil) in Kochi.

== Media career ==
After finishing course in Cochin media school he Assisted for a song sequence in a Tamil movie Sura and a Telugu movie Gangaputrulu under Sabu James. Also assisted him in 2 ads. He also Assisted cinematographers like Sunilkumar and Prahlad Gopakumar for few ads like Anupama Jewellery, Mazhavil Manorama Thambola ads etc. Recently assisted cinematographer Shiju Guruvayoor for Tata Steel Tiscon advertisement.

Did few independent works too like non-commercial ad of Godrej Hair dye, a music video Aaraanu Nee, short films like Whyga, The Game, Meat is Murder(docu-fiction), an ad campaign of Ford Ecosport.
