= Margi Sathi =

Kerala dancer

Margi Sathi (official name P. S. Sathi Devi) (1965–2015) was an exponent of Nangiǎr Kūthu which is a form of performing art derived from Koodiyattam and which is traditionally performed by the female members of the Chakkyar community of Kerala. She was also an accomplished expert in enacting the female characters in Koodiyattam. She has performed extensively within India and abroad. A notable performance was at the UNESCO headquarters in Paris in October 2001 as part of a programme to mark UNESCO's proclamation of Kutiyattam as a "masterpiece of oral and intangible heritage of humanity". Sathi had written the attaprakaram (performance manuals) for several Nangiǎr Kūthu performance. The attaprakaram for Sreeramacharitham (the story of Rama from Sita's point of view) has been published as a book in 1999. She has also appeared in a few Malayalam movies.

== Life ==
Margi Sathi was born in 1965 at Cheruthuruthy in Thrissur as the daughter of Puthillathu Subramanyan Embranthiri and Parvathy Andarjanam. She started learning Koodiyattom at Kerala Kalamandalam and under Painkulam Rama Chakyar. After her marriage with late idakka maestro N Subramanian Potti, she moved to Thiruvananthapuram and joined the Margi dance institute in 1988. It was her association with the dance institute that gave the epithet Margi in her name. Margi is an organization dedicated to the revival of Kathakali and Koodiyattam, two classical art forms of Kerala. Her husband died of electrocution while she was shooting for the Koodiyattam-based movie Nottam, on 30 June 2005. After her husband's death Sathi moved to Kalamandalam as a teacher in Koodiyattam based on a first-of-its kind order by Kerala State Government. She died at the Regional Cancer Center in Thiruvananthapuram on 1 December 2015. She was going on her battle with cancer for a long time, and was admitted to RCC a week before her death, after her condition worsened. She leaves behind two children, Revathi, a teacher and a Koodiyattom artist, and Devanarayanan, an edakka artist and former student at Pattambi Sanskrit College.

== List of movies in which Sathi acted ==
- Swapaanam (2014) Swapaanam (as Achyuthan's Wife)
- Ivan Megharoopan (2012) (as poet's mother)
- Making of a Maestro (2010) (as Thamburati)
- Raamaanam (2010) (as Aatta Beevi)
- Drishtaantham (2007)
- Nottam (2005)

== Books authored by Sathi ==
- "Sitayanam" (Stage presentation Manual) (2008)
- "Kannakicharitham" (Stage presentation Manual)(2002)
- "SreeRamacharitham Nangiarkoothu" (Stage presentation Manual) - Published by D.C.Books, Kottayam, Kerala (1999) in Malayalam with an appendix on 'Nangiar Koothu' in English by Ayyappa Panikker.

== Recognitions ==
Margi Sathi's contributions to the world of performing arts have been widely recognised and she had earned several awards in appreciation of her work.

- Junior Fellowship of the Ministry of Culture, Government of India for research project in Nangiarkoothu (1997)
- Kerala Sangeetha Nataka Akademi Award for Koodiyattam (2002)
- Kaladarpanam Award (2008)
- Natyarathna Puraskaram by Thunchan Smaraka Samithi, Thiruvananthapuram (2008)
- Nomination for the award of Padmasree
