= Malayalam drama =

Genre of Malayalam literature of India

Malayalam drama, known as Natakam (നാടകം) in Malayalam, is an important genre of Malayalam literature. The origin of Malayalam drama can be traced back to various performing arts of Kerala such as Kathakali. Drama, as is understood now, is a borrowed art form in Kerala and started with the publication of the Malayalam translation of Abhijnana Shakuntalam in 1882. The field of Malayalam theatre and drama became active by the end of the 19th century. It played an active role in the early-20th-century Kerala reform movement.

== Early history ==
=== Sanskrit era ===
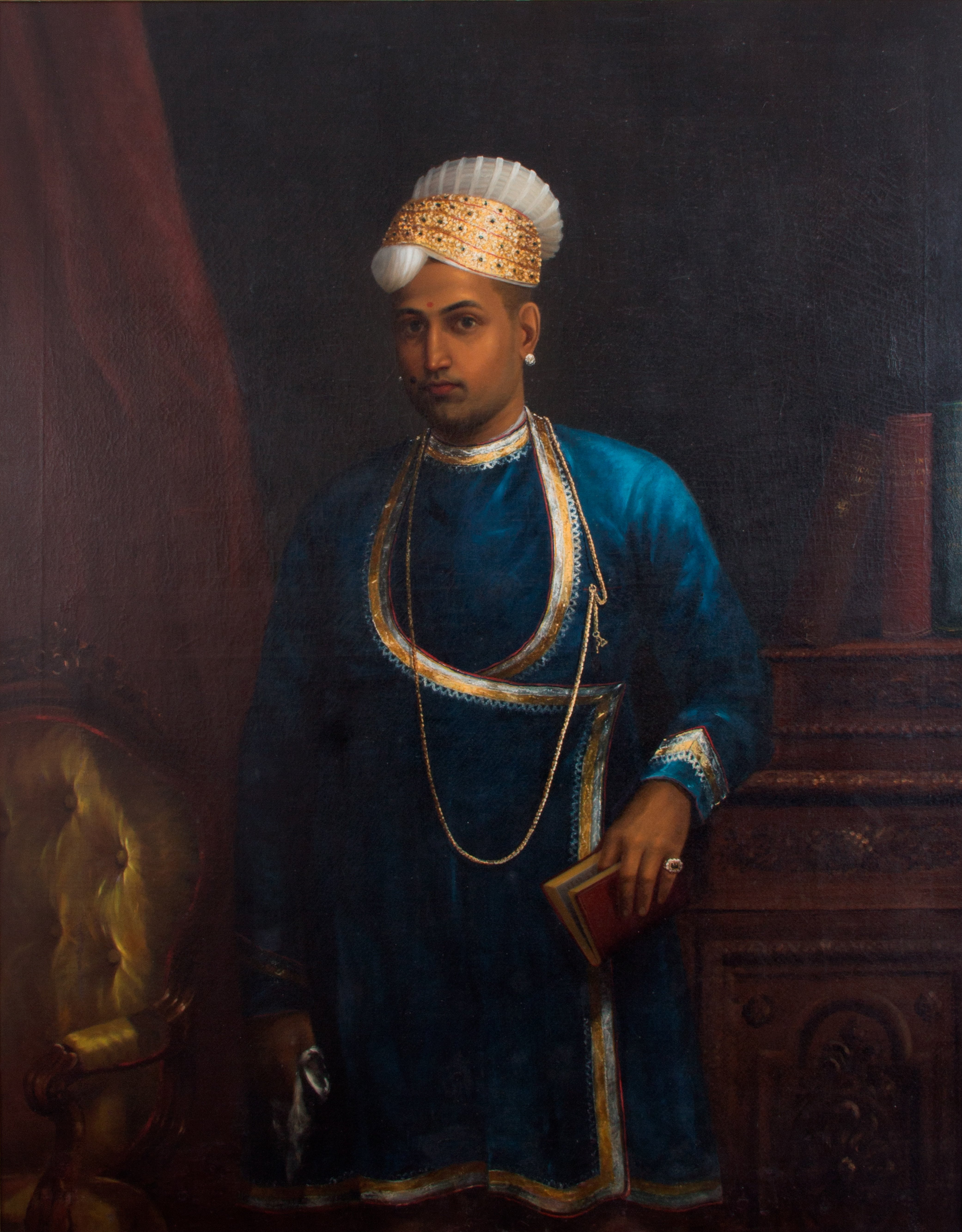
Kerala Varma's translation of Abhijnana Shakuntalam (1882) was an acclaimed work of poetry and was a success on the stage.

The elements of drama can be found in various performing arts of Kerala such as Kathakali and Thullal. Drama, as is understood now, is a borrowed art form in Kerala. The Portuguese who came to Kerala in the sixteenth century, had popularised Chavittu Natakam, a type of play similar to the miracle plays of the west. The earliest examples of this type are Genoa, Caralman (Charlemagne) and Napolean. These plays however did not influence Malayalam literature in any way. The influence of Sanskrit is evident in the early Malayalam plays. In 1882, Kerala Varma Valiya Koil Thampuran translated the Sanskrit drama Abhijnana Shakuntalam into Malayalam. Although it was written in a highly Sanskritised Manipravalam style, it is regarded as the first literary work in Malayalam that fits into the modern definition of drama. The success of this work influenced several translations of Sanskrit plays in quick succession. Many Sanskrit dramas like Janaki Parinayam (1889) Mālavikāgnimitram (1890), Vikramōrvaśīyam, Uttararamacarita (1892), Ascharya Choodamani (1893), Svapnavasavadattam and Madhyamavyayoga had translations in Malayalam. Abhijnana Shakuntalam was the most successful among all, having come out in nearly two dozen translations. The most important translators included Kerala Varma Valiya Koil Thampuran, A. R. Raja Raja Varma, Attoor Krishna Pisharody and Vallathol Narayana Menon. In addition to renderings of works by Sanskrit dramatists, several writers attempted original plays in Sanskrit. There are over 100 Sanskrit plays credited to authors from Kerala.

=== Musical dramas ===
The interest in Sanskrit dramas did not last long. The musical dramas were getting popular in Tamil Nadu and made its way into Kerala too. Some of the earliest notable works of this type in Malayalam include Sangeeta Naishidham by T. C. Achutha Menon, Sadarama by K. C. Kesava Pillai and Balagopalan by Kuttamath. The music dramas of Malayalam were essentially modelled on the Tamil prototype. The Tamil musical dramas were mostly filled with long drawn-out songs and had little importance for prose dialogue. Malayalam musical dramas deviated in style and tried to conserve some measure of dramatic propriety. The interest in musical dramas did not sustain for long as people demanded something more realistic. Nevertheless, the tradition survives even now in a masked form, in the liberal use of songs in popular types of theatrical production. Manomohanam Company (Thiruvattar Narayana Pillai) and Rasikaranjini (Chambathil Chathukutty Mannadiyar) were famous theatre groups in Kerala.

=== Western influence ===
The first translation of a Shakespearian play to appear in Malayalam was Almarattam (1866) by Kalloor Oommen Philippose. A free translation of The Comedy of Errors, it was also the first Malayalam play to be published as a book. During the last quarter of the 19th century and the early decades of the 20th century, many Western plays were translated into Malayalam. Shakespeare's plays were widely translated. Examples are Almarattam, Portsiaswayamvaram (Chembakaraman Velayudhan – The Merchant of Venice), Kalahinidamanakam (Kandathil Varghese Mappillai – The Taming of the Shrew), Hamlet (Kodungallur Kunjikkuttan Thampuran) and Othello (Sanjayan). In Kalahinidamanakam, the translator Indianises the incidents and the names of characters and places. Petruchio is Parthasarathy, Tranio is Tranakan, Biondello is Pandunki, Grumio is Kumaran and Curtis is Kattari. Similarly, the places Padua becomes Patalipuram and Verona becomes Varanadesham. The other works that were translated during the 19th century include Ghosts, Rosmersholm, (Henrik Ibsen), A Marriage Proposal (Anton Chekhov), The Power of Darkness (Leo Tolstoy), The Rivals (Richard Brinsley Sheridan) and Oedipus Rex (Sophocles).

=== Original plays in Malayalam ===
A few original plays were written in Malayalam during the last quarter of the 19th century. This includes Kodungallur Kunjikkuttan Thampuran's Lakshanasangam, Naduvath Achan Nambuthiri's Bhagavadduth (1892), Polachirakkal Kocheeppan Tharakan's Mariamma Natakam and Kochunni Thampuran's Kalyani Natakam (1889). Munshi Ramakurup wrote Chakkichankaram in mockery of the rise of vernacular plays in Malayalam. Sarasakavi K. C. Narayanan Nambiar composed another satirical play in Malabar also titled Chakkichankaram.

== Early-mid 20th century ==
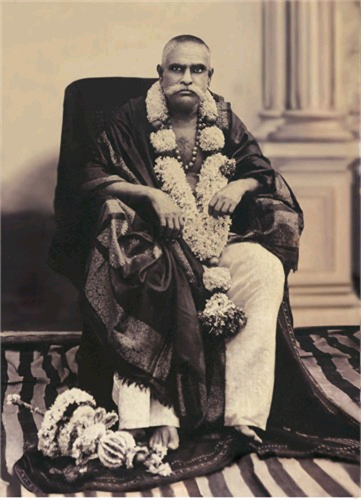
C. V. Raman Pillai was an important writer during the early periods of Malayalam drama. He wrote several humorous plays including Pandathe Pachan and Doctorkku Kittiya Mitcham

C. V. Raman Pillai was the first to write farces in Malayalam. Examples include Pandathe Pachan, Butler Pappan, Doctorkk Kittiya Mitcham, Kuripinte Thiripppu, Kurupillakalari and Kaimalassante Kadassikai. E. V. Krishna Pillai, N. P. Chellappan Nair, M. G. Kesava Pillai, T. N. Gopinathan Nair and others further developed farce literature. Kainikkara Padmanabha Pillai gave a new light to the world of theatre with his works like Kalvariyile Kalpa Padapam, Velu Thampy Dalava and Agnipanjaram. Edasseri Govindan Nair's socio-political play Kootu Krishi (1940), Thirichhethhal, Njetiyil Patarathha Mulla and Njangal Dayaye Thookkikkonnu, Kainikkara Kumara Pillai's Harishchandran, Mohavum Muktiyum, Veshangal etc. are also notable works. V. T. Bhattathiripad wrote Adukkalayail Ninnu Arangathekku which strongly reacted against the decadence of the Nambudiri community and was an important event in the social reform calendar of Kerala. M. P. Bhattathiripad's Ritumati was another important social play. K. Damodaran's Pattabaki which tells the story of a poor tenant in Malabar evicted by a cruel landlord, is the first political play in Malayalam. Another notable work is (. Important political dramas of the period include P. Kesavadev's Munnottu, Madyapani, Pradhana Mantri, Thakazhi Sivasankara Pillai's Thotilla, Ponkunnam Varkey's Jethakkal and Visarikku Katu Venda, Thoppil Bhasi's Ningalenne Communistaaki and Mudiyanaya Puthran. K. T. Muhammed's plays like Karavatta Pasu and Ithu Bhoomiyanu are also noteworthy. N. Krishna Pillai, who is known as Ibsen of Malayalam, wrote plays that took Malayalam drama forward in different directions. His works include Bhagna Bhavanam, Kanyaka, Balabalam, Anuranjanam' and Azhimughathekku.

== Post-independence ==
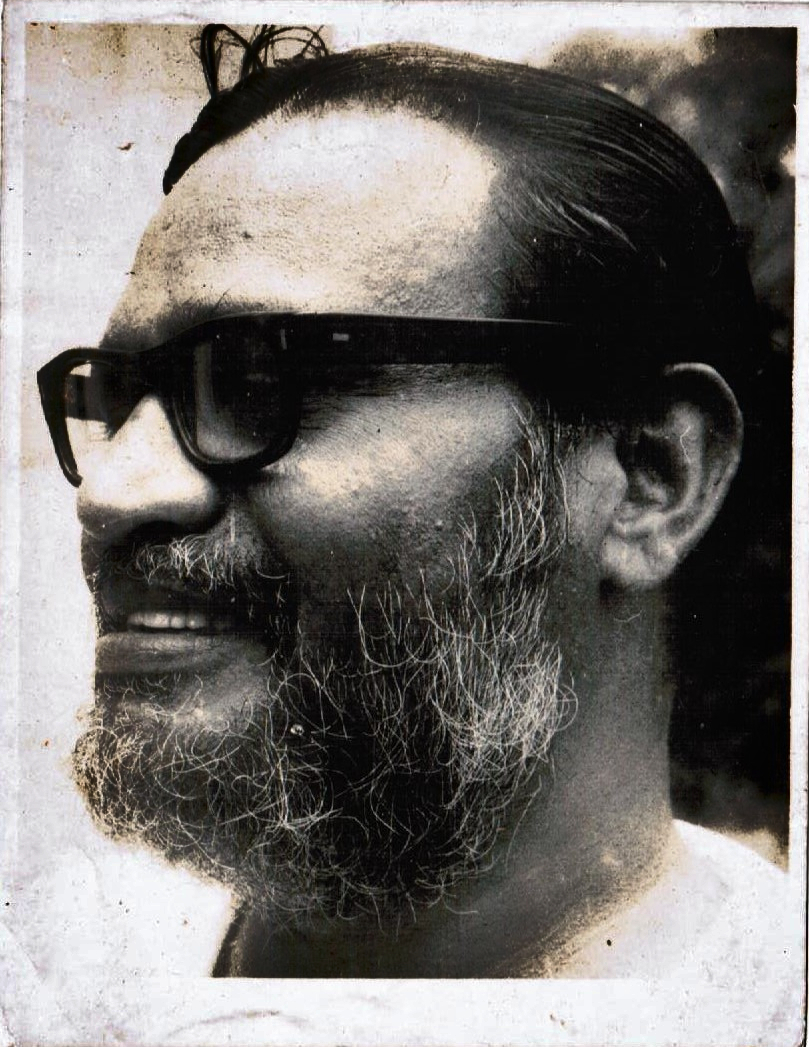
G. Sankara Pillai who was an advocate of total theatre helped introduce a system and academic discipline to modern Malayalam theatre.

Pulimana Parameswaran Pillai's Samatvavadi written in an expressionist style can be said to be the harbinger of a change in Malayalam drama. C. J. Thomas and C. N. Sreekantan Nair, who can be called the pioneers of modern Malayalam drama, came to the scene after Parameswaran Pillai. Thomas's Avan Veendum Varunnu, 1128-il Crime 27 and Aa Manushyan Nee Thanne, and Nair's Ramayana trilogy—Kanchana Sita, Saketham and Lankalakshmi—clearly reoriented the Malayalam theatre world. G. Sankara Pillai, N. N. Pillai etc. further developed this stream. One-act plays and radio plays emerged in the 1940s. K. Ramakrishna Pillai and N. N. Pillai were the pioneers of one-act plays. Important writers of radio play include S. K. Nair, Ananda Kuttan, P. Bhaskaran, Vira Raghavan Nair, C. N. Sreekantan Nair, Nagavally R. S. Kurup, Jagathy N. K. Achary and Edasseri Govindan Nair.

As part of introducing the new experiments in western theatre to Malayalam, several ancient Greek plays were translated into Malayalam. C. J. Thomas is the most important of the translators. Renowned as a playwright, dramatist and critic, he translated Sophocles' Oedipus Rex and Antigone, and Aristophanes' Lysistrata into Malayalam. Euripides' Alcestis was translated by S. K. Nair as Pati Devata and Medea was translated by Puthussery Ramachandran. Aristophanes' The Frogs was translated by E. M. J. Venniyoor as Thavalakal. Greek drama translations have crucial importance in the history of Malayalam drama.

Although indigenous drama (Thanathu Nataka Vedi) was formed during the days of C. N. Sreekantan Nair, Kavalam Narayana Panicker's works widened its scope. Dramas like Karinkutti, Kalathini, Avanavan Kadamba, Daivathar and Kaikutappadu belong to this trend. Vayala Vasudevan Pillai (Kuchelagatha, Varavelppu, Kalapporu, Yatra), P. M. Taj (Ravunni, Kudukka, Mary Lawrence, Rajavinte Chenda), P. J. Antony (Inquilabinte Makkal, Nilaykatha Ganam), Thikkodiyan (Jivitam, Punyatheertham, Pushpavrishti, Theepori), P. Balachandran (Pavam Usman, Samarayilekk), Narendra Prasad (Ira, Souparnika, Marthandavarma Engane Rakshapettu), Vasu Pradeep(Smarakam, Kannadi Kashanangal, Thazhum Thakkolum), Civic Chandran (Kurisu Yuddham Thudangunnavar, Ningal Aare Communist Akki), Jayaprakash Kuloor (Appunnikalude Radio, Nayattu, Velichenna), K. V. Sreeja (Ororo Kalathilum, Kalyana Saree), M . Sajita (Matsyagandhi, Beauty Parlour) and N. Sasidharan (Charitragatha, Udampadi Kalam (co-written with E. P. Rajagopalan), Kelu (co-written with E. P. Rajagopalan), Ravanan Kota) are some important playwrights of the later period.

== Theatre groups ==
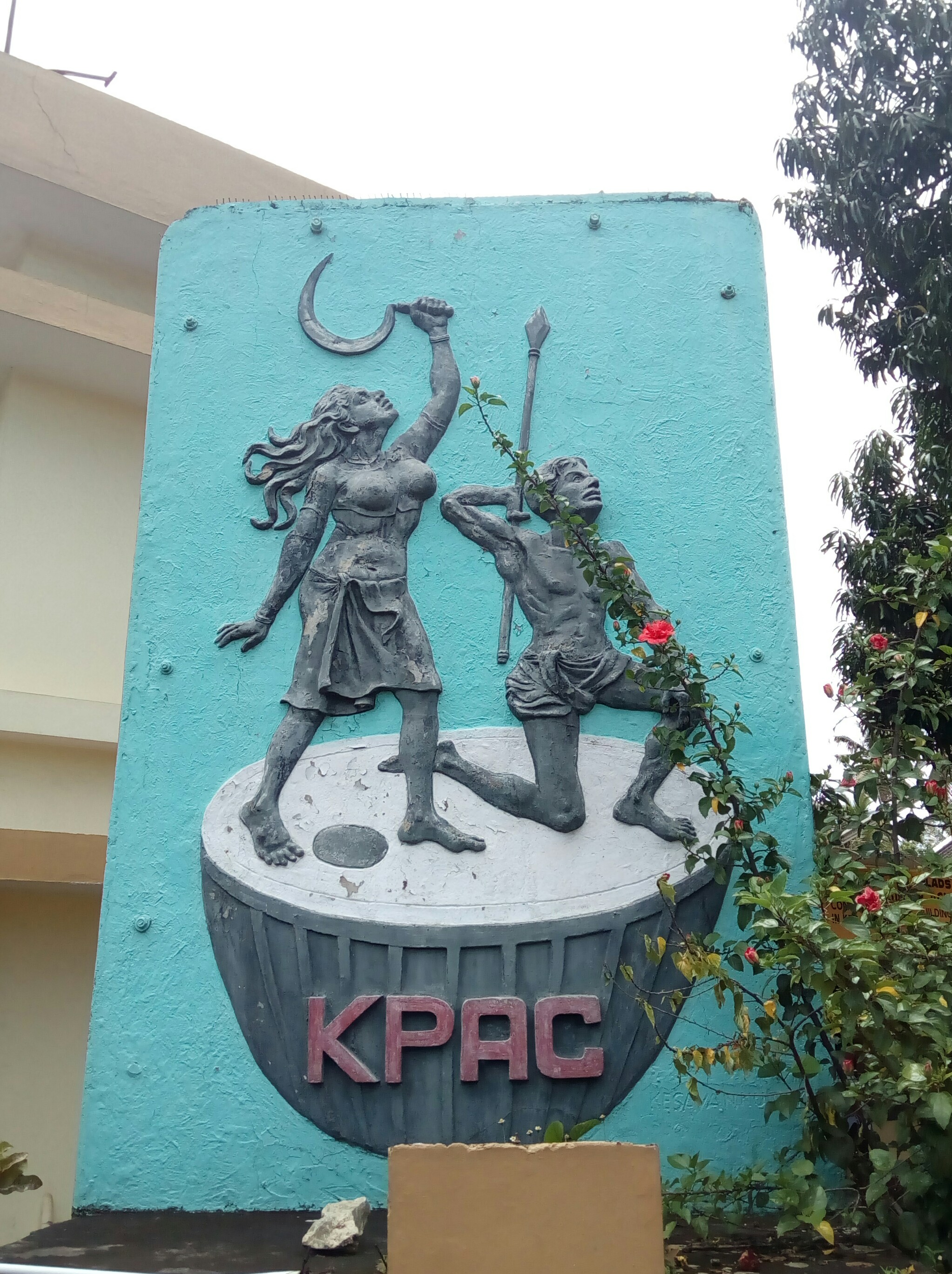
Kerala People's Arts Club (KPAC) is one of the most influential theatre groups in Kerala.

Manomohanam Company (Thiruvattar Narayana Pillai) and Rasikaranjini (Chambathil Chathukutty Mannadiyar) were famous theatre groups in Kerala during the early period of Malayalam drama. Indian People's Theatre Association (IPTA) was formed in 1942 in Bombay and was committed to the Indian independence movement. The association was linked with the communist movement and it influenced leftist theatrical productions in Kerala. Malabar Kala Samithi was established in Malabar in 1948 to promote amateur drama. It later became Kendra Kala Samithi. Edasseri Govindan Nair, M. Govindan, V. T. Bhattathiripad and Uroob were associated with this organisation. Kendra Kala Samithi became Kerala Kendra Kala Samithi in 1957 and closed down when Kerala Sangeetha Nataka Akademi was established in 1958. Influenced by the Indian People's Theatre Association, the progressive writers of Kerala linked with the Communist Party of India founded the Kerala People's Arts Club (KPAC) in 1950. Its founders include G. Janardhana Kurup, N. Rajagopalan Nair, K. S. Rajamani, Poojappura Krishnan Nair, Kambisseri Karunakaran, Narayana Pillai and O. N. V. Kurup. Their first drama Ente Makananu Sari was not a success. KPAC screened Thoppil Bhasi's Ningalenne Communistakki in 1952, was a path-breaking play in the history of Malayalam theatre.

Navasamskara Samithi was formed in Trivandrum in 1950 with the aim of reforming Malayalam theatre. Its founders include N . Krishnapilla, P. K. Vikraman Nair, S. Guptan Nair, Ananda Kuttan and C. J. Thomas. The Samithi presented Krishna Pillai's Anuranjanam and Bhagnabhavanam, and C. J. Thomas's Avan Veendum Varunnu but closed down soon afterward. Kainikkara Padmanabha Pillai's Dramatic Bureau and C. N. Sreekantan Nair's Kalakerala were also short-lived.

In 1956, a theatre group called Kalavedi was formed with N. Krishna Pillai as president and C. N. Sreekantan Nair as Secretary. Most of the prominent figures in Malayalam drama have worked in connection with Kalavedi. Vikraman Nair, T. N. Gopinathan Nair and Adoor Bhasi are some of them. Kalavedi presented dramas such as Nashta Kachavadam, Kunhali Marakkar, Kanchana Sita etc. Nataka Kalari was established by K. Ayyappa Panicker, G. Sankara Pillai and C. N. Sreekantan Nair and was instrumental in the growth of indigenous theatre in Kerala. Other theatre groups include Brothers Music Club (Calicut–K. T. Muhammed), Navatarangam (Kottayam–G. Sankara Pillai), Pratibha Arts (Cochin-P. J. Antony), Sopanam Theatre (Trivandrum–Kavalam Narayana Panicker), Kalidasa Kalakendram (Kollam–O. Madhavan) and Kalanilayam (Trivandrum–Kalanilayam Krishnan Nair).

== Playwrights ==
The following is a list of dramatists and playwrights in Malayalam.

- A. Santha Kumar
- C. J. Thomas
- C. L. Jose
- C. N. Sreekantan Nair
- C. V. Raman Pillai
- Cherukad
- E. V. Krishna Pillai
- G. Sankara Pillai
- Ibrahim Vengara
- Jagathy N. K. Achary
- K. T. Muhammed
- K. Thayat
- Kainikkara Kumara Pillai
- Kainikkara Padmanabha Pillai
- Kavalam Narayana Panicker
- Muthukulam Raghavan Pillai
- N. Krishna Pillai
- N. N. Pillai
- N. N. Pisharody
- N. P. Chellappan Nair
- Narendra Prasad
- Ochira Velukkutty
- Omchery N. N. Pillai
- P. Balachandran
- P. Kesavadev
- P. M. Taj
- Ponkunnam Varkey
- S. L. Puram Sadanandan
- Surasu
- T. M. Abraham
- Thakazhi Sivasankara Pillai
- Thikkodiyan
- Thoppil Bhasi
- Thuppettan
- Vaikom Chandrasekharan Nair
- Vayala Vasudevan Pillai

== Major works ==
Some of the important plays in Malayalam drama include:

Historical plays

- Sitalakshmi, Raja Kesavadas, Iravikuttippillai — E. V. Krishna Pillai
- Kalvariyile Kalpa Padapam, Velu Thampy Dalava — Kainikkara Padmanabha Pillai

Humorous plays and farces

- Kaimalassante Kadassikkai (1915), Pandathe Pachan (1918), Butler Pappan (1922) — C. V. Raman Pillai
- B. A. Mayavi, Pranayakkamishan, Mayamanushan, Pennarasunad — E. V. Krishna Pillai
- Nilavum Nizhalum, Parivartanam, Akavum Puravum — T. N. Gopinathan Nair

Social plays

- Mariyamma Natakam — Kocheeppan Mappillai
- Adukkalayil Ninnum Arangathekku (1929) — V. T. Bhattathiripad
- Ritumati — M. P. Bhattathiripad
- Marakkudakkullile Maha Narakam (1927) — M. R. Bhattathiripad
- Bhagnabhavanam, Kanyaka and Balabalam — N. Krishna Pillai
- Tharavaditham — Cherukad
- Ithu Bhoomiyanu — K. T. Muhammed

Political plays

- Pattabakki — K. Damodaran
- Pratima, Vellappokkam — K. Ramakrishna Pillai
- Ningalenne Communistakki (1952), Innale Innu Nale, Mudiyanaya Puthran — Thoppil Bhasi
- Nammalonnu, Swatantra — Cherukad
- Jnanippam Communistavum, Pradhana Mantri, Munnottu — P. Kesavadev
- Koottu Krishi (1940) — Edasseri Govindan Nair
- Jethakkal and Visarikku Katu Venda — Ponkunnam Varkey
- Inquilabinte Makkal — P. J. Antony
