= Midhun Mohan =

Indian Multimedia artist

- മിഥുൻ മോഹൻ
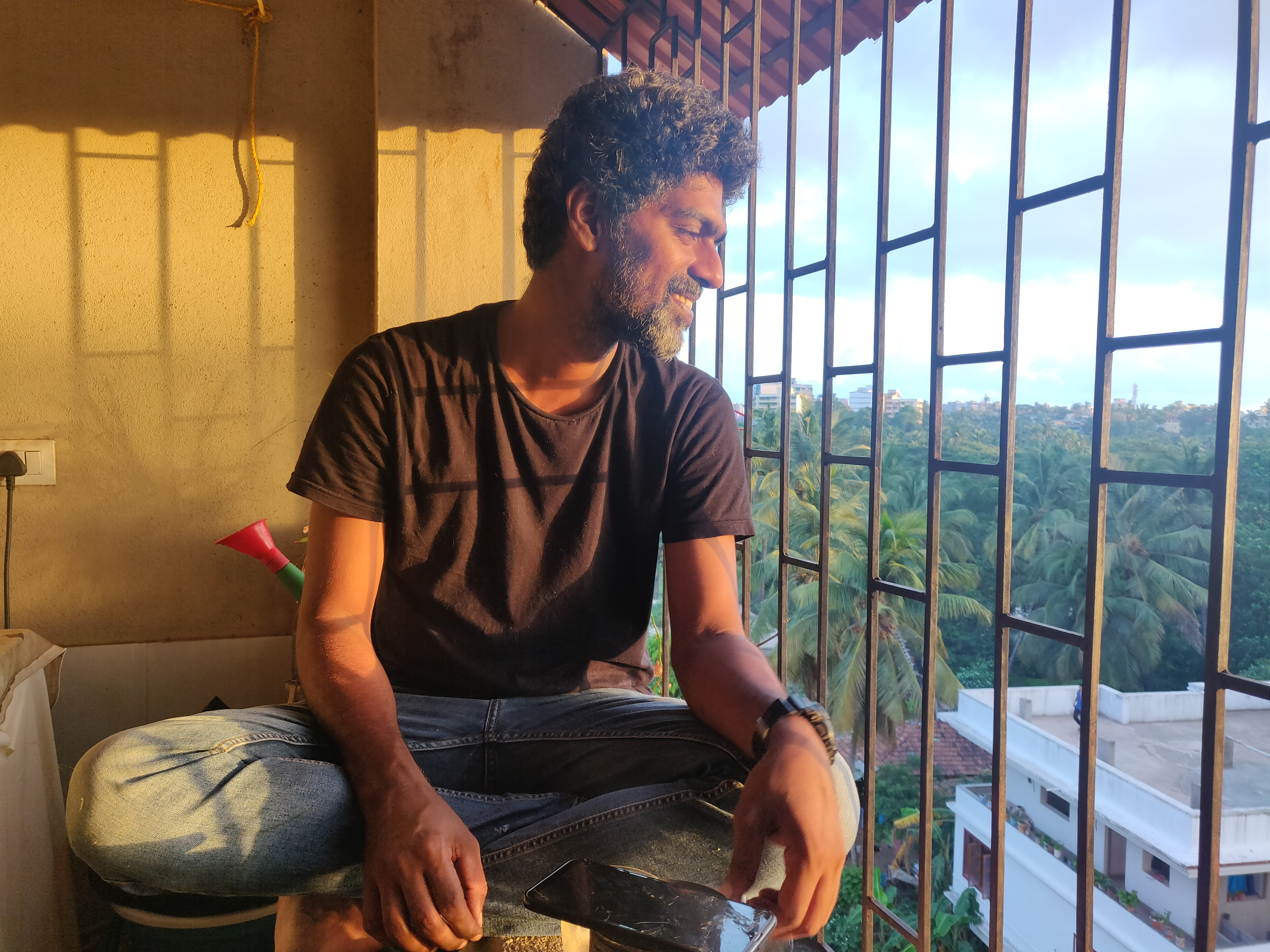
- Born: Midhun Mohan; 12 February 1985; Shoranur, Palakkad, Kerala
- Died: 5 June 2023 (aged 38)
- Occupations: Sculptor; Painter
- Spouse: Lathika N
- Parent(s): Mohandas T & Kanakalatha K R

Midhun Mohan (12 February 1985 – 5 June 2023) was an Indian contemporary artist known for exploring digital and haptic dimensions in art. He worked across media including digital painting, video, and mixed media, often bridging traditional and digital practices. His work examined how technology influences human perception, emotion, and memory. Mohan frequently engaged with philosophical ideas associated with thinkers such as Gilles Deleuze, Antonin Artaud, and Baruch Spinoza, interpreting them through visual and affective forms. Midhun Mohan explored multiple art forms with remarkable versatility. He collaborated with filmmakers and theatre practitioners across a wide range of projects. In theatre, Midhun worked with noted directors such as Deepan Sivaraman, Abhilash Pillai, Aliyar Ali, and Kannan Unni, contributing his visual imagination to diverse performance worlds.

== Early life & Education ==
Midhun Mohan studied art in Kerala, where he became known for detailed sketches and an early interest in Soviet Constructivism. His realistic drawings of abandoned industrial sites, including areas around HMT Junction in Kalamassery and Kakkanad, showed a focus on themes of industry and decay. This phase is often described by contemporaries as his period of “realistic sketching”. During this time, he worked closely with peers and mentors in Kerala's art scene, gradually developing an independent visual language that blurred the boundary between digital and manual art practices.

== Major Works ==
=== The Laughter Series ===
In The Laughter Series, Midhun Mohan used visual deformation as a strategy of expression and concealment. Early works featured laughing monkeys, referencing the philosophical idea of “becoming-animal” associated with Gilles Deleuze and challenging human-centered perspectives. Later works, including Deformed Gandhi, used distortion to question collective memory and moral iconography In his later digital works, Mohan created spectral imagery drawn from obituary pages, news media, and online photographs, including images of women, fading snowy landscapes, and ghostlike figures. These works explored themes of memory, loss, and the circulation of images in digital culture.

=== The Sea & Those Who Came by Sea ===
Mohan's interest in maritime histories developed through collaborations and exchanges with oceanographer Latika and artist Subodh Kerkar. While working at the Museum of Goa (MOG), he produced Father Figure, a motion-picture work depicting Vasco da Gama juggling objects associated with sea trade. The piece combined personal memory—modeled on his father, Swathi Mohanan—with reflections on colonial history, presenting the sea as both archive and medium. His collaboration with Riyas Komu in the 2022 project: Sea A Boiling Vessel initiated by Aazhi Archives marked a new phase in his practice. The project functioned as both an exhibition and research platform, bringing together artists and scholars to explore the Indian Ocean as a space of migration, exchange, and memory.

== Midhun Mohan in Amphibian Aesthetics ==
Amphibian Aesthetics is not only an exhibition presenting Midhun Mohan’s restless conceptual universe; it is also an intervention that opens new spaces for his art to continue its journey. Through this effort, Aazhi Archives does not simply preserve Midhun Mohan’s work in memory but moves it toward new conversations and future interpretations. Within this context, Midhun Mohan’s series of works becomes a deeply memorial space, where he rereads spiritual and cultural artistic expressions emerging from Kochi’s layered histories of maritime trade, colonial memory, and folk belief, calling back lost histories and suppressed presences. In this exhibition, Midhun Mohan, Kappiri Muthappan, the mosque tomb, and other works together become a vessel carrying journeys and deposits of history. As the idea of Amphibian Aesthetics suggests, life does not move as a single linear narrative but emerges in the interstitial spaces between land and water, history and belief, politics and memory. Midhun Mohan’s works inhabit precisely this threshold, becoming an amphibian presence between spirit and history, grief and resistance, migration and homeland. Midhun Mohan here is therefore not merely a personal tribute, but an ethical engagement with an amphibian vision that teaches us to coexist with voices that history has tried to erase.
