= School of Drama and Fine Arts =

Institution for Drama & Music in Thrissur, India

- Type: Public
- Established: 1977; 49 years ago
- Founder: G. Sankara Pillai
- Parent institution: University of Calicut
- Affiliations: University Grant Commission (India)
- Director: Abhilash Pillai
- HOD: Najumul Shahi
- Faculty: 9
- Location: Thrissur, Kerala, 680618, India; 10°30′25″N 76°11′27″E
- Website: drama.uoc.ac.in

The School of Drama and Fine Arts, established in 1977, a drama school and a department of University of Calicut, is a prime institution in India giving academic training in the theatrical and practical aspects of drama and theatre. It is located in one of the off-campus centres of University of Calicut, Dr. John Matthai Centre, in Aranattukara, Thrissur, Kerala, India. It offers courses on Integrated Master of Theatre Arts, Master of Theatre Arts, Master of Arts in music, and PhD in theatre. The institution is affiliated to University of Calicut. The school hosts International Festival of Theatre Schools (IFTS) each year. The department collaborated with Kerala Sangeetha Nataka Akademi for conducting a theatre workshop for transgenders, the first time in India, as part of the International Theatre Festival of Kerala in 2018.

== Courses offered ==
- 5 years course on Integrated Master of Theatre Arts (IMTA)
- 2 years course on Master of Theatre Arts (MTA)
- 2 years course on Master of Arts in Music
- 3-5 years course on PhD in Music and Theatre

== Research chairs ==
In November 2024, the Minister for Higher Education R. Bindu announced the establishment of three research chairs, named after celebrated theatre scholars G. Shankara Pillai, Vayala Vasudevan Pillai and Ramachandran Mokeri, at the School of Drama and Fine Arts.

The Prof. G. Shankara Pillai Chair for South Asian Theatre and Performance Research will focus on fostering research into Asian performance traditions, preserving their legacy, and expanding them into the digital realm. The chair aims at creating a comprehensive digital library documenting South Asian theatre.

The Prof. Vayala Vasudevan Pillai Chair for Research in Kerala and Malayalam Theatre will explore the rich tradition of Malayalam theatre, the intersection of technology and performance, and promote a deeper understanding of Kerala’s cultural and artistic history.

The Prof. Ramachandran Mokeri Chair for Applied Theatre and Practice will focus on theatre’s role in social change, language acquisition, and theatre therapy. The chair’s work will bridge the gap between traditional theatre and its applied forms, including community-based theatre and theatre for social justice.

== Notable alumni ==
- Jose Chirammel – Theatre practitioner
- Shyamaprasad – Film maker
- Narippatta Raju – Theatre practitioner
- D. Raghoothaman – Actor
- Ranjith – Film maker
- V. K. Prakash – Film maker
- Sandhya Rajendran – Theatre and film artist
- Alex I. Kadavil – Malayalam film producer and writer
- B. Vindhyan- Malayalam film producer
- Kukku Parameswaran - Theatre and film artist
- Roysten Abel – Theatre director and playwright
- Abhilash Pillai – Theatre director
- Neeraj Madhav Actor and Rapper
- Rajesh Touchriver – Film maker and scenographer
- K. S. Sreenath – Writer, director and scholar
- K. P. Suveeran – Theatre and film director
- K. V. Manjulan- Actor and director
- Deepan Sivaraman – Theatre director and scenographer
- M. G. Jyothish – Actor and director
- Sankar Venkateswaran – Theater director
- P. Balachandran – Director, playwright, actor, script writer in film and theatre
- Manu Jose – Actor and story teller
- Murali Menon – Actor
- Garggi Ananthan – Theatre and film artist
