= G. Sankara Pillai Cultural Complex =

Cultural center in Thrissur, Kerala, India

G.Sankara Pillai Cultural Complex
- Address: Thrissur; India
- Operator: Kerala Lalithakala Akademi

Construction
- Opened: 18 January 2014

G. Sankara Pillai Cultural Complex is a cultural center located in the city of Thrissur, Kerala, India. It was inaugurated on 18 January 2014 by K. C. Joseph, Kerala's Minister for Culture. The complex is named after G. Sankara Pillai, one of the best playwrights in Malayalam literature.

== Layout ==
There will be total 11 stages, media centre, rehearsal hall and a convertible stage in the complex. The 11 stages have been named after the masters of fine arts, drama, music, cinema and literature. The International Theatre Festival of Kerala from 2014 will be held in the cultural complex. There is an air conditioned hostel for artists and a cafeteria which is opened till 10:00 PM.

== Performance venues ==
- K. T. Muhammed Regional Theatre
- Thoppil Bhasi Drama House
- Murali Outdoor Theatre
- S. Guptan Nair Hall
- Prem Nazir Open Air Cinema Theatre
- Peruvanam Narayana Marar Melathara
- O. Madhavan Navajyotsna Theatre
- N.N. Pillai Open Air Theatre
- Surasu Square
- Jose Chiramel Square
- N. Krishna Pillai Avenue
- C.J. Thomas Conference Hall
- Vaikom Chandrasekharan Nair Seminar Hall
- Thikkodiyan Entrance
- V. Dakshinamurthy Garden
- C. N. Sreekantan Nair Guest House
- Premji Media Centre
- M. R. Bhattathiripad Library
- Chembai Music and Archives
