= Kalloor Oommen Philipose =

Kalloor Oommen Philipose Asan (1838–1880) was a priest, teacher, literary scholar, journalist, playwright and translator from Kerala, India. He was born in Kallooppara near Tiruvalla and grew up in Olassa in the present-day Kottayam district of Kerala. He was the editor of Paschima Taraka, one of the earliest Malayalam journals. The journal was a Malayalam publication from the publishers of the Cochin-based English newspaper Western Star. Philippose was fluent in English and Malayalam, and translated The Comedy of Errors into Malayalam under the title Almarattam (1866) which was the first translation of Shakespeare into Malayalam. It was also one of the earliest plays written in Malayalam and was the first play to be published as a book.

== Biography ==
Philipose was born in 1838 in Kallooppara near Tiruvalla in the present-day Mallappally taluk of Pathanamthitta district. He was the son of Kalloor Oommen of Kallooppara and Pathil Annamma of Aymanam. Later the family moved to Olassa in the Kottayam district. Philipose lost his parents when he was young and was brought up by his mother's family. He started learning Sanskrit at a young age and after his schooling, he joined CMS College Kottayam. Philipose excelled in English, Greek, and Latin, as well as mathematics, chemistry, and astronomy.

On 1 November 1859, at the age of twenty, he joined the Anglican Church School in Cochin as a Malayalam teacher (Asan). In 1869, he became a member representing Cochin in the Travancore Church Council.

On 27 February 1862, he married Unicharamma, the daughter of Olassa Aenadikkal Thomman Varkey. On 24 March 1865, he became the editor of Paschima Taraka, a newspaper published from Cochin. He was one of the first newspaper editors in Malayalam. He wrote articles that criticised the Catholic Church and the Pope. In 1866, he published Almarattam which was the first Malayalam play to be published as a book. His other literary works include Amarakosa Pradipika and Shabdadipika. Philipose also translated some texts but before they could be published, he died of liver disease on 20 July 1880. He was buried in St. Marks CSI Church in Olassa.
