= Roysten Abel =

Indian theatre director and playwright

Roysten Abel is a noted Indian theatre director and playwright, known for devised theatre and plays involving folk performers, and productions like Othello a Play in Black and White, Flowers, The Manganiyar Seduction, and A Hundred Snake Charmers.

== Early life and education ==
Born in Kerala, he grew up in Palakkad, Kerala and did his schooling from Good Shepherd International School, Ooty. Thereafter he joined Christ College, Bangalore to study commerce, however he was determined to not join his family business. Instead, he left it and joined School of Drama, Thrissur. He left one year before completion, when he received a scholarship to join the National School of Drama, Delhi. He graduated from NSD in direction in 1994, also in the same year, he apprenticed with the Royal Shakespeare Company, England for a year.

== Career ==
After his return from England, Abel started his career by forming Indian Shakespeare Company in 1995, intending to stage works of Shakespeare. Eventually in 1999, he directed his first original production in 1999, Othello – a Play in Black and White, which won a Fringe First Award at Edinburgh before touring internationally. The plays depicts stage actors rehearsing Shakespeare's Othello, and gradually begins to deal with issues like elitism and racism. He later also adapted the play and directed film, In Othello (2003), with Sheeba Chaddha, Adil Hussain, Barry John as leads.

Inspired by the 2002 Gujarat riots, he directed The Spirit of Anna Frank in 2002, which dealt with themes of gender and caste-violence, as five women meet in a compartment on a night train. The ensemble cast included Shabana Azmi, Zohra Sehgal, Nandita Das and Mandakini Goswami. This was followed by Perfect Evening, which premiered in Delhi in 2005. In 2006, he directed Girish Karnad's Flowers.

His next important production was The Manganiyar Seduction, a show which featured over 40 Manganiyar musicians from Rajasthan, the set design was inspired in part by the Hawa Mahal in Jaipur, and also by the red light district of Amsterdam. The play opened in New Delhi in 2006, and thereafter travelled to the UK, US, Germany, Austria and Australia.

The 2013 production The Kitchen, had 12 mizhavu drummers from Kerala playing, with traditional dessert payasam is also cooked on stage, which served amongst the audience after the show. It opened at International Theatre Festival of Kerala in December 2013.

== Personal life ==
He is married to Assamese actress Mandakini Goswami, who he met while studying as National School of Drama. The couple live in Kerala.

== Plays ==
- Othello – a Play in Black and White (1999)
- The Spirit of Anna Frank (2002)
- The Manganiyar Seduction (2006)
- The Kitchen (2013)
