= T. M. Abraham =

Indian theatre director and playwright

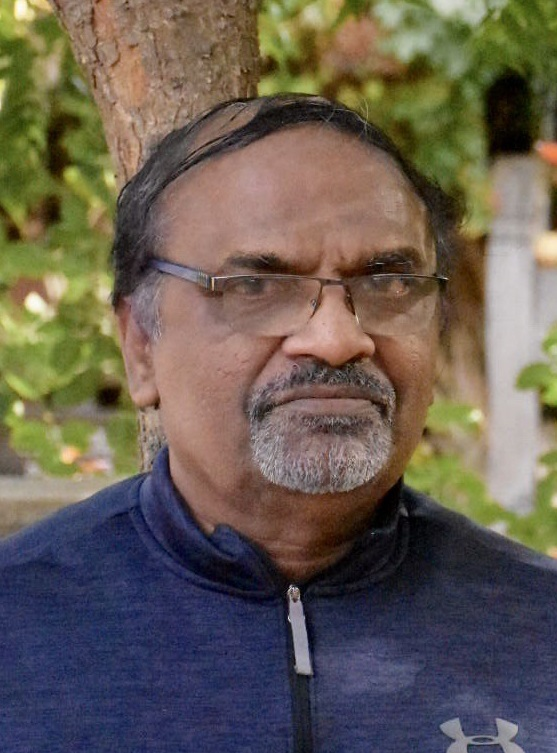
- Abraham in 2019
- Born: Thottathimyalil Mathew Abraham; June 1, 1949 (age 77); Thodupuzha, Idukki district, Kerala, India
- Occupations: Theatre director, playwright
- Notable work: Peruthanchan (Collection of plays); Naveena Nataka Chintakal (Essays on theatre); Kozhutha Kalakutty (Collection of plays); Keerimuricha Kannu (Collection of plays)

Thottathimyalil Mathew Abraham (born 1 June 1949) is an Indian theatre director and playwright. He is the former Vice Chairman of the Kerala Sangeetha Nadaka Academy. He is also the recipient of the Kerala Sangeetha Nadaka Academy awards for playwriting, Kerala Sahitya Academy Award for the play Peruthachan and the Government of Kerala award for best play direction.

== Early life and education ==
Abraham was born at Neyyassery village in Thodupuzha, Idukki district of Kerala in a Syrian Catholic Christian family to Mathew son of Ouseph of the Thottathimyalil house and Aleykutty Mathew. He was the second son among 11 children. Abraham attended St. Sebastian School, Neyyassery, Thodupuzha. He graduated from the University of Kerala. He also holds a Postgraduate Diploma in Public Relations.

== Books published ==
Abraham has published 27 books in Malayalam in various categories, including novels, dramas, monographs, and translations.

Novels

- Ulpatthi
- Shantigiri

One act play collections

- Perunthachan
- Nashtapetta Chirakukal
- Athbuthanganam
- Pravukal Ippol Karayunnila
- Keeri Muricha Kannu
- Rakthabali
- Kozhutha Kalakutty

Drama

- Nizhal Koodaram
- Ekakikaluda Thazhvara

Theatre Books

- Abhinayakala Oramugham
- Theatre Games Kuttikalkku
- Naveena Nataka Chintakal

Translations

- Vadhu – Malayalam translation of H. S. Shivaprakash's Kannada play.
- Jesus CEO – Malayalam translation of Jesus CEO by Laurie Beth Jonas.
- The Path – Malayalam translation of The Path by Laurie Beth Jonas.
- Yesukristhuvinte Suvishesham – Malayalam translation of Gospel According to Jesus Christ by Nobel laureate Jose Saramago's Portuguese novel.
- Caligula – Malayalam translation of Nobel laureate Albert Camus's play.
- Abhinaya Patagala - Malayalam translation of The Art of Acting by Richard Boleslavsky.
- Miss Julie - Malayalam Translation of Miss Juile by Swedish writer August Strindberg.
- The Father - Malayalam Translation of Miss Juile by Swedish writer August Strindberg.
- Mary Magdalene - Malayalam translation of the play by Belgian playwright Maurice Maeterlinck.
- Anthar Anthare Nayikkumbol - Malayalam translation of collection of four plays by Belgian playwright Maurice Maeterlinck.

Monographs

- N. N. Pillai – Monograph on Malayalam playwright N. N. Pillai.
- Prof. G. Sankara Pillai - Manograph on Malayalam playwright Prof. G. Sankara Pillai.
- K.T. Mohammed - Monograph on Malayalam playwright K.T. Mohammed.

His play Rakthabali was translated into Bengali and was published in the special issue of the Bengali Theatre Journal Shoodrak in the year 2000. Nashtapetta Chirakukal was translated into Hindi.

== Awards and recognitions ==
- First prize in the all Kerala Professional Drama competition conducted by the Government of Kerala in 1980, for the play Aham Aham.
- Best Director Award in the all Kerala Professional Drama competition conducted by the Government of Kerala in 1980.
- Kerala Sahitya Akademy Award in 1981 for the play collection Perunthachan.
- Kerala Sangeetha Nataka Akademi Award in 1993 for the best playwright.
- K.C.B.C. Literary Award in 1994, for the one act play Pravukal Eppol Karayunnilla.
- V. T. Bhattathiripad award for the play collection Keerimuricha Kannu in 2001.
- Senior Fellowship by Government of India, Department of Culture, in 2004.
- Kala Ratna Award by Kalasadan Thrissur, for his contributions to the Malayalam Theatre, in 2010.
- Abu Dhabhi Malayalee Samajam Award for his contributions to the Malayalam Theatre, in 2010 .
- Chavara award by Chavara Cultural Academy in 2017 for the contributions in Theatre and drama.

== Plays directed ==
- Perunthachan, 1976
- Atphutanganam, 1978
- Aham Aham, 1980
- Nashtapetta Chirakukal, 1982
- Pavakoothu, 1984
- Pravukal Ippol Karayunnilla, 1985
- Yayati, 1988
- Swapana Bhavanam, 1992
- Caligula, 1993 (Original play by Albert Camus translated into Malayalam.)
- The Queen and the Rebels, 1995 (Original play by Ugo Betti translated into Malayalam.)
- Thuglaq, 2002 (Original Kannada play by Girish Karnad translated into Malayalam.)
- Antigone, 2003 (Original French play by Jean Anouilh translated into Malayalam.)
- Madhavi, 2004 (Original Hindi play by Bhisham Sahni translated into Malayalam.)
- Madhavi, 2005 (Madhavi was presented at the 7th Bharath Rang Mahotsav, at New Delhi on 18 January 2005. The Festival was conducted by the National School of Drama, New Delhi.
- Oedipus, 2005 (Original Greek play by Sophocles translated into Malayalam.)
- Waiting for Godot, 2006 (Original French play by Samuel Beckett translated into Malayalam.)
- Prathibimbam, 2007 (Original Marathi play by Mahesh Elkunchwar translated into Malayalam.)
- Death and the Maiden, 2017 (Original Chilean play by Ariel Dorfman translated into English.)
