= Njan Piranna Nattil =

- Directed by: P. Chandrakumar
- Written by: P. M. Thaj
- Produced by: Sarasa; Rajacheriyan
- Starring: Mohanlal; Aruna; Raghavan; Bhagyalakshmi
- Cinematography: S. J. Thomas; R. Ramalingam
- Edited by: K. Narayanan
- Music by: A. T. Ummer
- Production company: Rivind Production
- Distributed by: Rajath Release
- Release date: 14 September 1985
- Country: India
- Language: Malayalam

Njan Piranna Nattil (transl. The land I was born in) is a 1985 Indian Malayalam-language film directed and produced by P. Chandrakumar and written by P. M. Thaj. The film stars Mohanlal, Aruna, Raghavan and Bhagyalakshmi. The film has musical score by A. T. Ummer.

== Cast ==
- Mohanlal as Inspector Rajasekharan
- Aruna as Sudha
- Bhagyalakshmi
- M. G. Soman
- Saleema as Shailaja
- Sankaradi
- Raghavan (actor) as S.P
- Kanchana (actress)
- Jose (actor)
- Ramu (actor)
- Vijayan (actor) Doctor
- Kaduvakkulam Antony constable
- Radhadevi

== Soundtrack ==
The music was composed by A. T. Ummer with lyrics by Poovachal Khader.

No.	Song	Singers	Lyrics	Length (m:ss)
1	"Moham Pole Megham"	K. J. Yesudas, K. S. Chithra	Poovachal Khader	
