= C. S. Venkiteswaran =

Indian film critic and writer

Chittur Subramanian Venkiteswaran
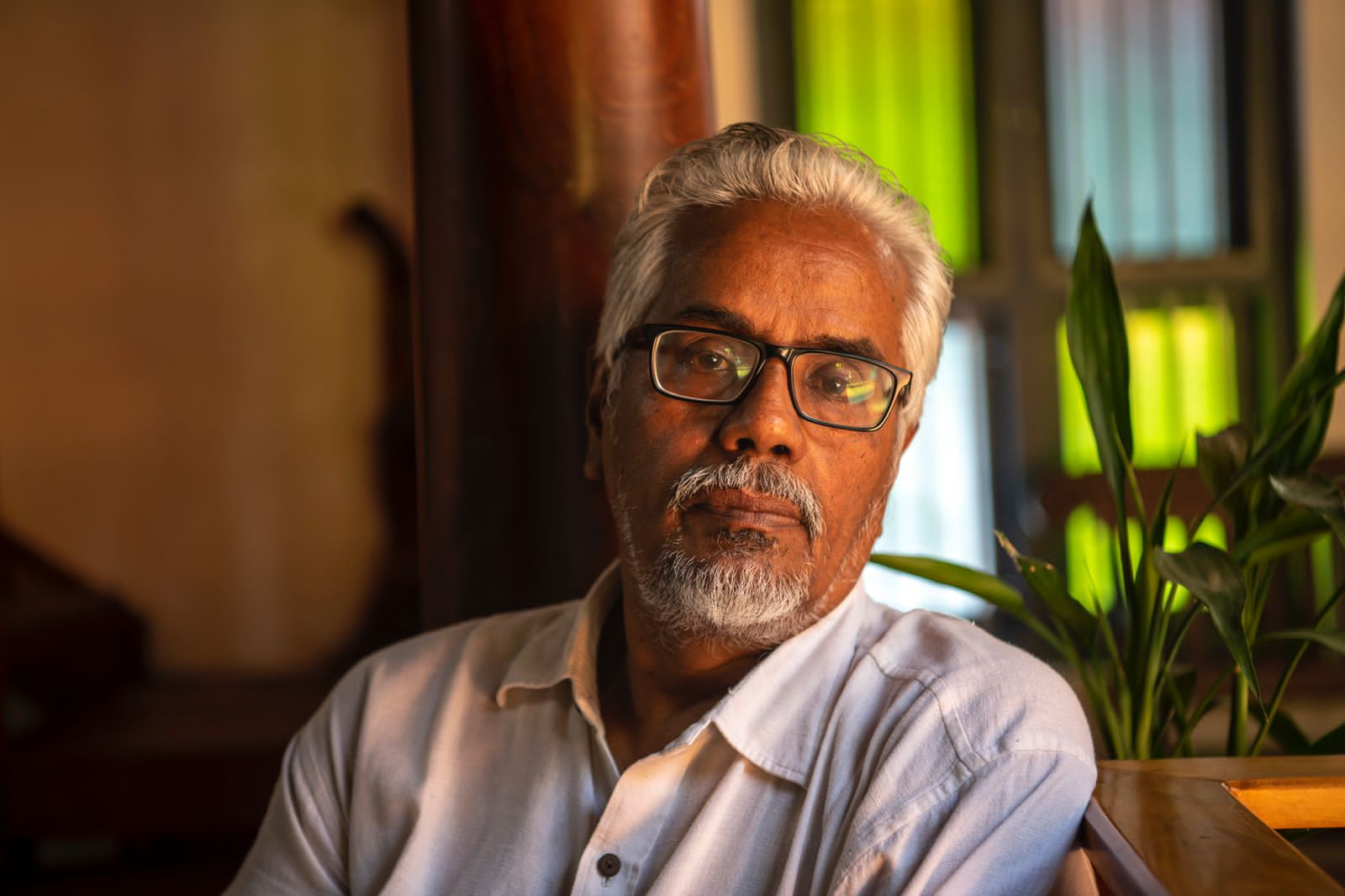
- Born: 23 May 1959 (age 67); Chalakudy, Thrissur Kerala, India
- Citizenship: Indian
- Education: Post Doctorate in Commerce and Management
- Alma mater: Calicut University
- Occupations: Documentary film director, Film Critic, professor
- Years active: 1970s – present
- Known for: Film Criticism
- Spouse: Muthulakshmi
- Parent(s): C.K. Subramaniam, T.V. Thylambal

Venkiteswaran Chittur Subramanian (born 23 May 1959) is an Indian film critic, professor, documentary filmmaker, and writer. He was born in Chalakudi, Kerala, India. He won the National Film Award for Best Film Critic in 2009 and the National Film Award for Best Arts/Cultural Film in 1995.

== Career ==
He has written about the social aspects of cinema and their artistic expression. His writings and reviews on film and media, in both English and Malayalam, have appeared in journals including Deep Focus, Film International, Cinema in India, Bhashaposhini, Pachakuthira, Indian Express, The Hindu, Mathrubhumi, and Madhyamam. He wrote the column "Rumblestrip" (1999–2008) in Indian Express, which covered films and media in Kerala.

He authored a book on filmmaker K. R. Mohanan titled Samanthara Yathrakal – K R Mohanante Cinema and co-edited A Door to Adoor, a book on Adoor Gopalakrishnan, with Lalit Mohan Joshi. Three books containing Venkiteswaran's articles on trends and developments in Malayalam cinema were published by DC Books at the DC International Book Fair and Cultural Fest in 2011. The book Malayala Cinema Padanangal won a Special Jury Mention in the State film awards for the year 2011. He has interviewed film personalities including Adoor Gopalakrishnan, T.V. Chandran, Werner Herzog and Jean-Luc Godard.

He is a documentary filmmaker and won the National Award for Best Arts/Cultural Film in 1995 along with M.R. Rajan for Pakarnattam – Ammannur, The Actor, the lyrical cinematic documentation of the life of Ammannur Madhava Chakyar, the exponent of the ancient classical Sanskrit theatrical artform of Koodiyattam. This film won the Kerala State Award for the Best Documentary category in the same year. His article "Tea-shops In Mayalam Cinema" was included in the revamped Kerala SCERT Class X English textbook in 2011.

He is the Artistic Director of the Signs film festival for short films and documentaries. He was a jury member for best writing on cinema at the 60th National Film Awards. In July 2018, he resigned from the Kerala State Chalachitra Academy as a gesture of protest against the state government's decision to invite Mohanlal as the chief guest for the event.

Venkiteswaran is also a subtitler, done subtitles for around 150 films.

== Aazhi Archives ==
C. S. Venkiteswaran is a key member of Aazhi Archives, a collective of artists, writers, and scholars working at the intersection of art, knowledge, and community. Since 2022, Aazhi Archives has been exploring Kerala’s oceanic histories and cultural networks through exhibitions, workshops, and collaborative research, guided by the mission: Art + Knowledge + People. His intellectual and curatorial contributions were instrumental in shaping the conceptual frameworks of exhibitions of Aazhi Archives.

== Awards ==
- 2023: Kerala State Film Awards – Best Book on Cinema.
- 2011: Kerala State Film Awards. - Special Jury Award for Best Book on Cinema
- 2009: National Film Awards - Best Film Critic
- 2005: Kerala State Film Award for Best Article on Cinema
- 1995: National Film Award for Best Arts/Cultural Film - Pakarnnattam – Ammannur the actor, shared with M.R. Rajan
- 1995: Kerala State Film Award for Best Documentary – Pakarnnattam – Ammannur the actor, shared with M.R. Rajan

== Bibliography ==
- Malayala Cinema Padanangal, DC Books, 2011

== Filmography ==
- Matha to Ma (2002) - Documentary on Mandakini Narayanan.
