= Deepan Sivaraman =

Indian theatre director and scenographer

Deepan Sivaraman ദീപൻ ശിവരാമൻ
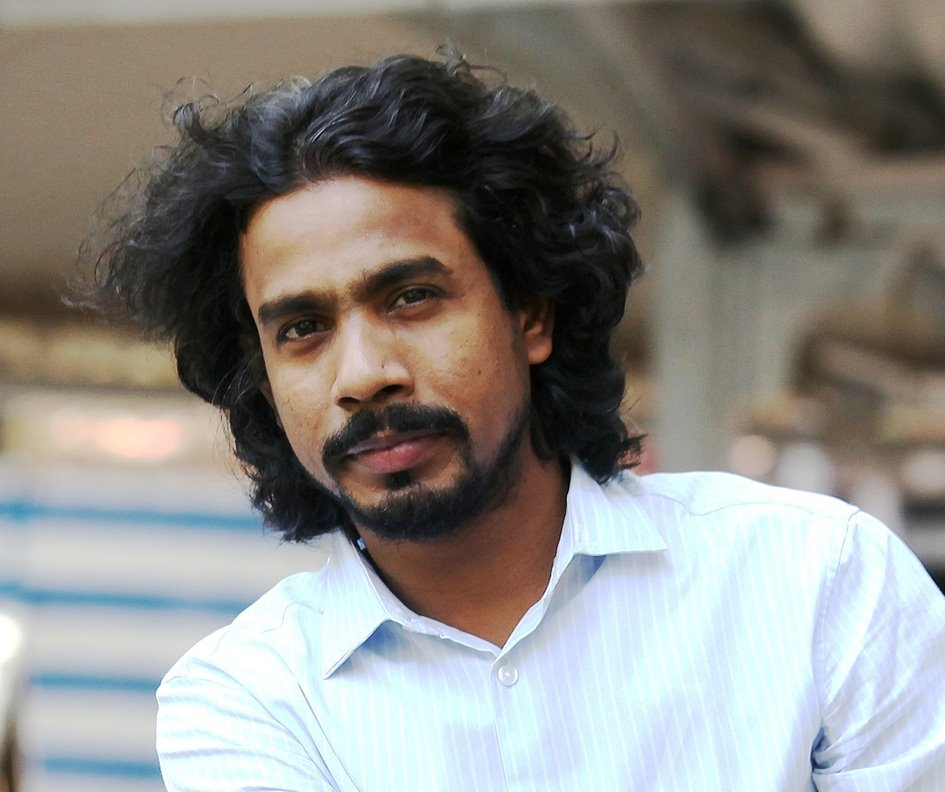
- Deepan Sivaraman in 2012
- Born: Deepan Sivaraman; Thrissur, Kerala
- Education: Central Saint Martins, Wimbledon College of Arts
- Occupations: Theatre director, scenographer and academic

Deepan Sivaraman is an Indian theatre director, scenographer and academic. He is the founder of Oxygen Theatre Company based in Delhi. He is from Thrissur, Kerala.

Sivaraman received Charles Wallace India Trust Award in 2003, Kerala Sangeetha Nataka Akademi Award and Mahindra Excellence in Theatre Awards in 2011 and 2010, respectively. Deepan served as the Artistic Director for the International Theatre Festival of Kerala(ITFOK) for 2014 edition which had a curatorial focus on transition, gender and spectatorship. Deepan Sivaraman currently is an associate professor of performance studies at School of Culture and Creative Expressions at the Ambedkar University in Delhi.

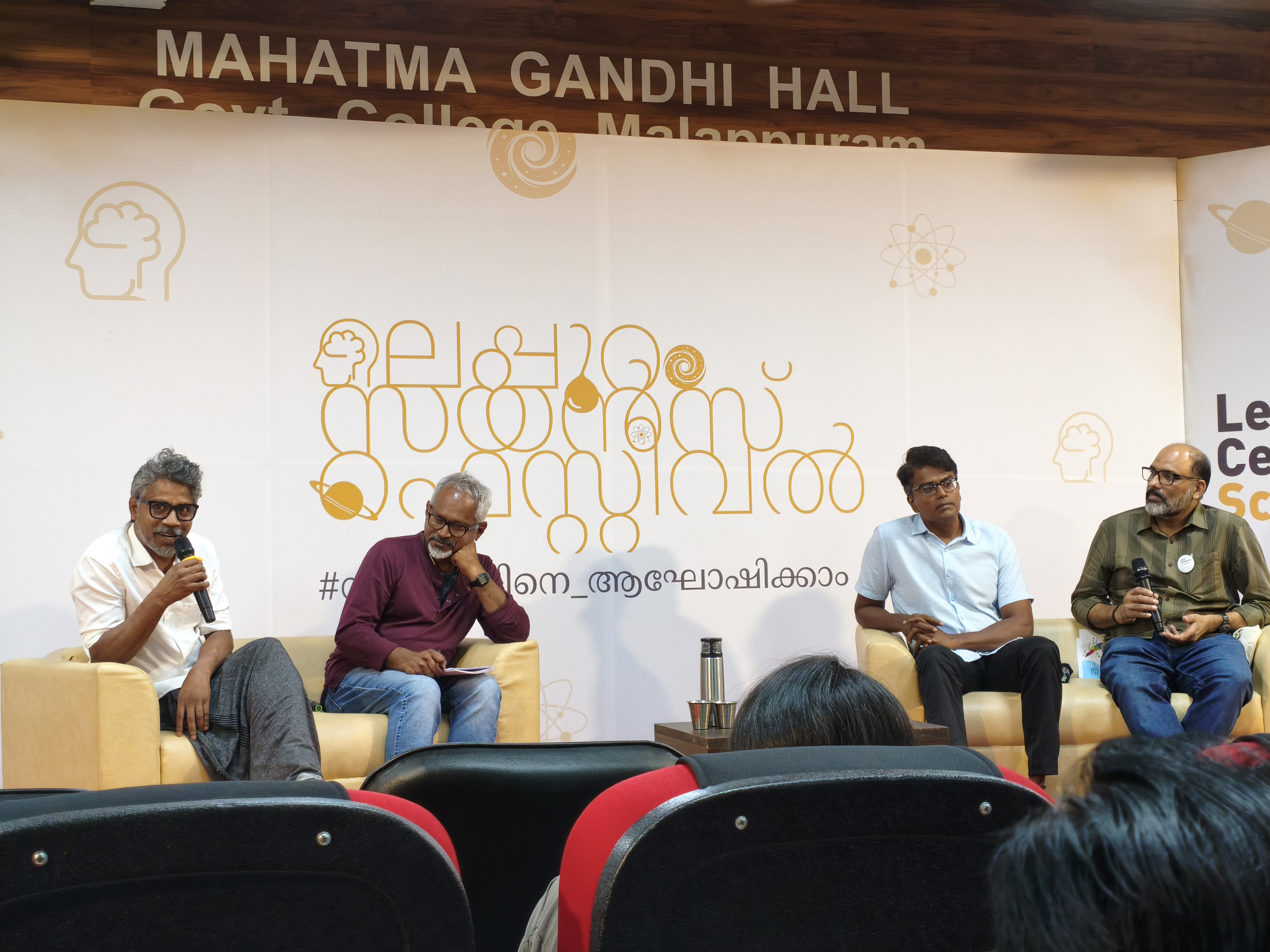
Deepan Sivaraman speaking at the KSSP Malappuram Science Festival 2026, alongside Ajai Narendran, Dr. Anand Narayanan, and Dr. T. P. Vinod

== The Legend of Khasak Khasakkinte Itihasam – The Play a Milestone ==
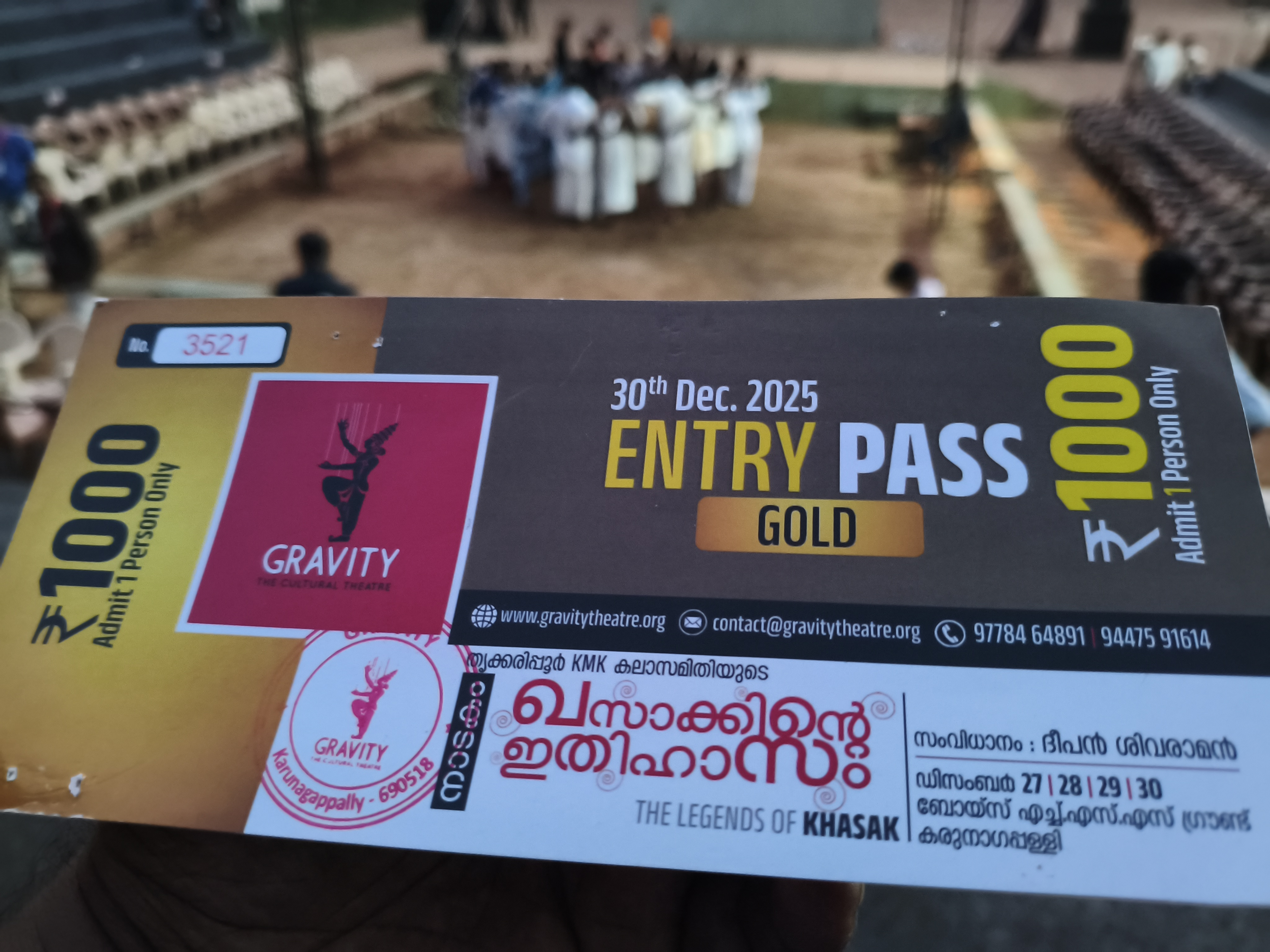
Entry Pass to a screening of the play Khasakkinte Ithihasam, directed by Deepan Sivaraman

Deepan involved with KM Kunjambu Smaraka Kalasamaithi.(KMK) Trikaripur for the project of The Legends of Khasak Khasakkinte Itihasam with the local village actors, it was a unique theatre project that has no similarities in the recent Indian theatre history in the terms of its production of working with village actors and the way in which the entire village got part of it. The trans – chronic post-modern novel of O. V. Vijayan, The Legends of Khasak Khasakkinte Itihasam is revived onto the stage, in the Land of dark native myths and tantalizing legends – Kasaragod. The geographical memory of Khasak is transplanted to the landscape of Kasaragod. The tree of life, Revered Time, Slits of spreading self and sins and mythologized nature of Khasak takes a re-birth to burn down into the body of the spectator. The performance fuses native religious rituals and native art forms in separately. The three months of theatre camp for the regional artists were a refreshing wind to the cultural present of Kerala, which proved that the rural art gatherings were not extinct in the cultural space. From the last remaining sapling spread a green hope which rushed the village into a spring of artistic thought. There were muted tunes, silenced slogans and an unbroken harmony which united the whole village onto the theatre. Portraying, or interpreting Khasak into its multidimensional plurality was a challenge to any medium, to which this theatrical interpretation stands as an exemption. The characters of Khasak Allapicha Mollakka, Maimuna, Appukili, Naizam Ali, Kuttandan Pushari and Ravi meet the spectators in the aesthetically subverted, politically deconstructed, surreal space.

== Directorial works along with its design ==
Year	Title	Credit
2018	Dark Things	Scenographer and co-director with Dr. Anuradha Kapur
2018	Nationalism Project	Director, Scenographer
2015	The Legends of Khasak	Director, Scenographer
2015	The Cabinet of Dr Caligari	Director, Scenographer
2014	It’s Cold in Here	Director, Scenographer
2014	Project Nostalgia	Director, Scenographer
2013	The Little Prince	Director, Scenographer
2011	Ubu Roi	Director, Scenographer & Dramaturge
2010	Peer Gynt Director	Scenographer, Dramaturge
2009	Spinal Cord	Director, Scenographer & Dramaturge
2004	The circle of the seasons	Director, Scenographer
2004	Dream of Death	Director, Scenographer
2002	Kamala	Director, Scenographer
1998	Lord of the Flies	Director, Dramaturge

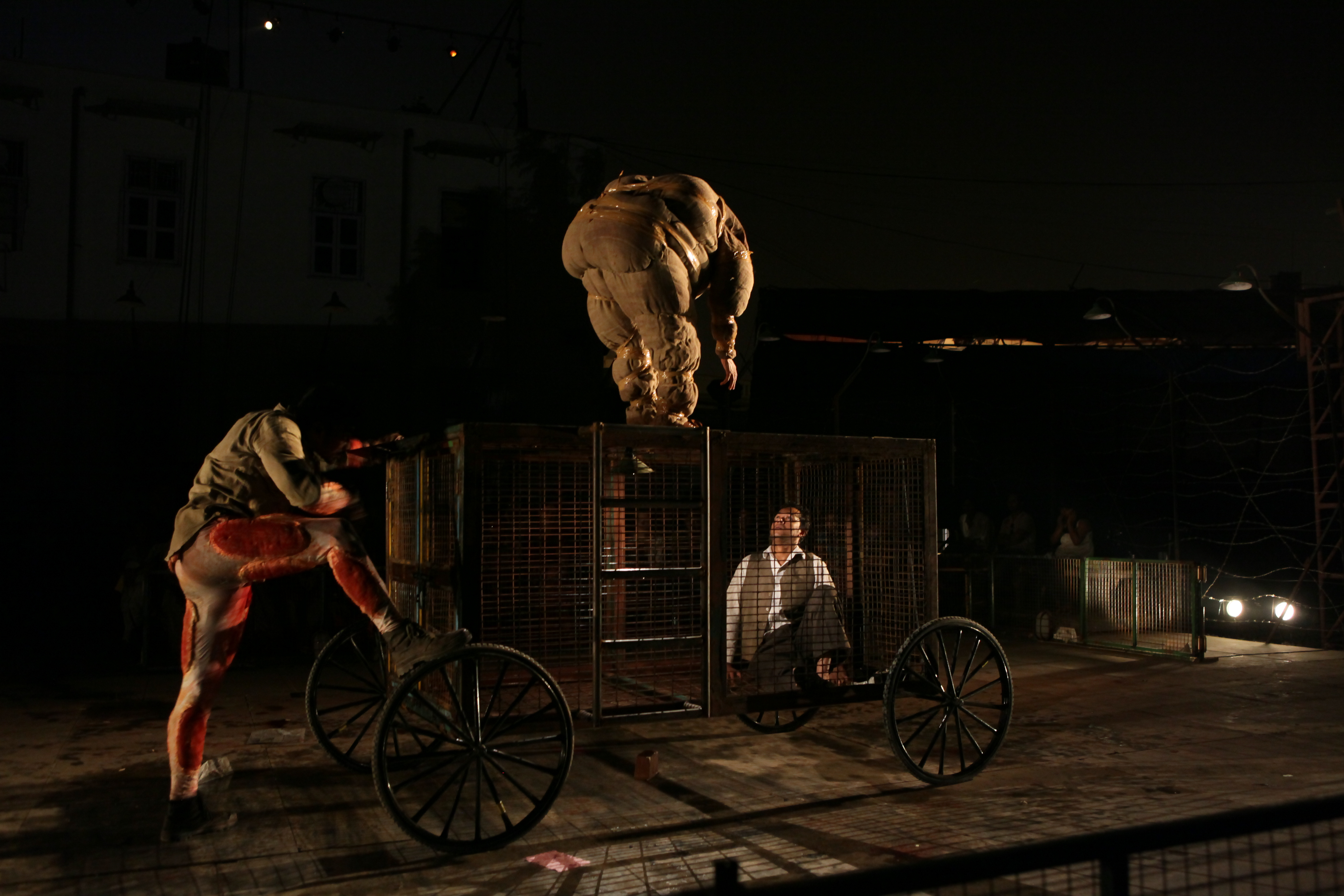
Ubu Roi-National School of Drama Delhi(2012)

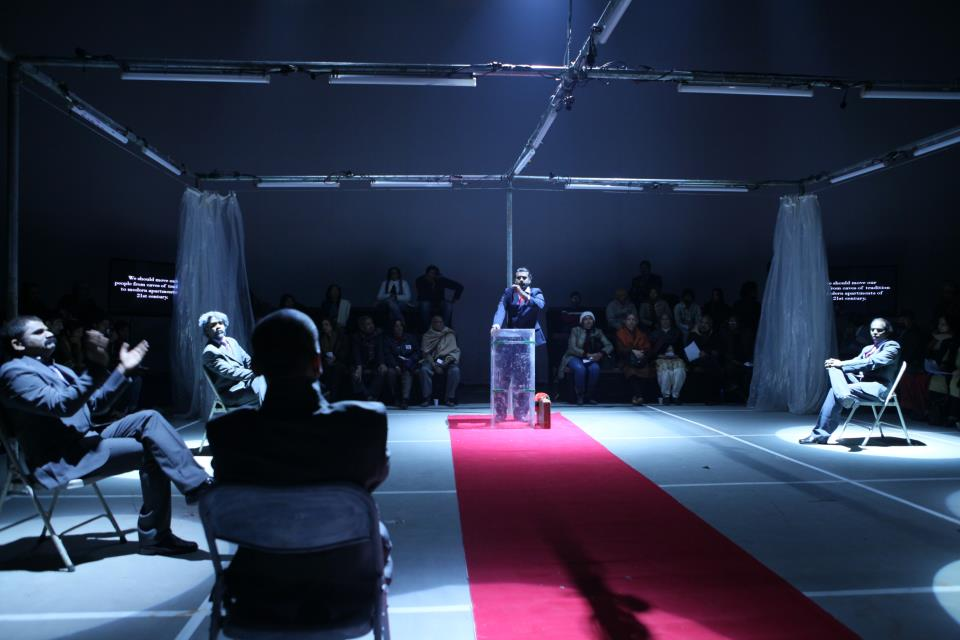
Peer Gynt-Produced by Oxygen Theatre Company Kerala(2010)

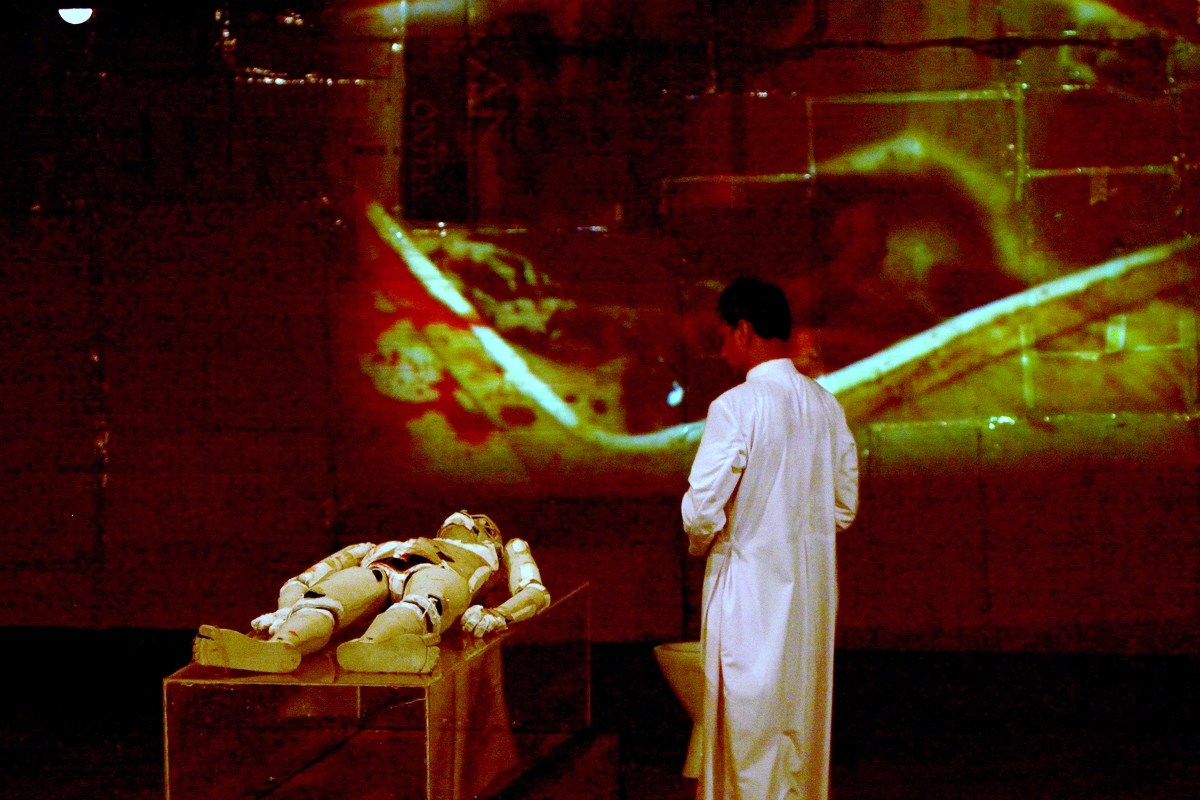
Spinal Cord-Produced by Oxygen Theatre Company(2009)

== Scenography works ==
Year	Title	Director	Producer
2018	The Girl in the Drain	Dr. Anuradha Kapur	National School of Drama Delhi
2017	Naked Voices	Neelam Mansingh Chowdhry	National School of Drama Delhi
2016	Talatum	Abhilash Pillai	Serendipity Art Trust Delhi
2016	Bitter Fruit	Neelam Mansingh Chowdhry	National School of Drama Delhi
2012	Virasat	Dr. Anuradha Kapur	National School of Drama Delhi.
2008	The Little India	Emily Grey	Trestle Theatre, UK
2006	Palm Grove Tales	Abhilash Pillai	School of Drama Thrissur
2003	Siddartha	Jyothish MG	Abhinaya Theatre Centre Thiruvananthapuram
2002	Bhagvadujjukeeyam	Jyothish MG	Abhinaya Theatre Centre Thiruvananthapuram
2001	Verdigris	Abhilash Pillai	Abhinaya Theatre Centre Thiruvananthapuram
2000	Thatri Realizing Self	J Shailaja	Kriya Collective Thiruvananthapuram

== Major Theatre Festivals participated ==
- 2019 – International Theatre Festival of Kerala Kerala, Dark Things
- 2018 – Wuzhen International Theatre Festival Shanghai, The Cabinet of Dr Caligari
- 2018 – YULICA International theatre festival Krakow, Nationalism Project.
- 2017 – International Theatre Festival of Kerala 9th Edition, The Cabinet of Dr Caligari
- 2016 – International Theatre Festival of Kerala 8th Edition, The Legends of Khasak
- 2016 – Bharat Rang Mahotsav Delhi, The Cabinet of Dr Caligari
- 2013 – International Theatre Festival of Kerala 7th Edition, Virasat
- 2012 – International Theatre Festival National School of Drama Delhi, Peer Gynt
- 2011 – International Theatre Festival of Kerala 5th Edition, Peer Gynt
- 2011 – National theatre Festival of Kerala, Peer Gynt
- 2010 – Ibsen Festival New Delhi, Peer Gynt
- 2010 – Mahindra Excellence in theatre Awards New Delhi, Spinal Cord
- 2010 – Rangayana National Theatre Festival Bangalore, Spinal Cord
- 2009 – International Theatre Festival National School of Drama Delhi, Spinal Cord
- 2009 – International Theatre Festival of Kerala, Spinal Cord
- 2009 – National Theatre Festival Thiruvananthapuram Kerala, Spinal Cord
- 2007 – Avignon Theatre Festival France, Siddhartha
- 2006 – Prithvi Theatre Festival Mumbai, Bagavdajjukam
- 2006 – South Asian Theatre Festival New Delhi, Siddhartha
- 2004 – International Theatre Festival National School of Drama New Delhi, Siddhartha
- 2003 – International Theatre Festival National School of Drama Delhi, Bagavadajjukam
- 2001 – International Theatre Festival National School of Drama New Delhi, Verdigris
- 2000 – Festival De Alameda Lisbon Portugal, Verdigris
- 2000 – Asian Woman Theatre Festival New Delhi, Thathri Realising Self

== Awards ==
- 2010 – Mahindra Excellence in Theatre Awards
- 2012 – Kerala Sangeetha Nataka Akademi Award
