= Kaapalika =

- Directed by: Crossbelt Mani
- Written by: N. N. Pillai
- Screenplay by: N. N. Pillai
- Produced by: Crossbelt Mani
- Starring: Sheela; Adoor Bhasi; Jose Prakash; Nambiyathu
- Cinematography: B. N. Haridas
- Edited by: V. Chakrapaani
- Music by: R. K. Shekhar
- Production company: United Movies
- Distributed by: United Movies
- Release date: 9 November 1973
- Country: India
- Language: Malayalam

Kaapalika is a 1973 Indian Malayalam film, directed and produced by Crossbelt Mani. The film stars Sheela, Adoor Bhasi, Jose Prakash and Nambiyathu in the lead roles. The film had musical score by R. K. Shekhar.

== Cast ==
- Sheela as Kaapaalika / Rosamma
- Adoor Bhasi as Pothachan/Peter/Alex's Father
- Jose Prakash as Priest
- Nambiyathu
- N. N. Pillai as Lazar, Rosamma's Father
- A. Madhavan
- Bahadoor as Gopalan
- K. P. Ummer as Alex/Mr. Nair
- Kuthiravattam Pappu as Ithakku
- Madhu Menon
- Mathew Plathottam
- N. Govindankutty as A. G. Nambiar
- Omana as Atha
- Paravoor Bharathan as Adibharamantha Swami/Antony
- Philomina as Eali/Rosamma's Mother
- Rani Chandra as Lillykutti
- Veeran as Ittooppu
- Vijayaraghavan (debut) as Babu

== Soundtrack ==
The music was composed by R. K. Shekhar and the lyrics were written by N. N. Pillai and Vayalar Ramavarma.

No.	Song	Singers	Lyrics	Length (m:ss)
1	"A Smash and a Crash"	K. J. Yesudas, P. Susheela	N. N. Pillai	
2	"Kapilavasthu"	N. Gopalakrishnan	N. N. Pillai	
3	"Sharapanjaram Pushpasharapanjaram"	K. J. Yesudas	Vayalar Ramavarma	
