= Sankar Venkateswaran =

Indian theatre director (born 1979)

Sankar Venkateswaran (born 1979) is an Indian theatre director.

== Education ==
Venkateswaran graduated with a first rank in theatre direction from Calicut University School of Drama & Fine Arts, Thrissur in 2002, after which he trained at Theatre Training and Research Programme (currently Intercultural Theatre Institute), Singapore in 2006.

== Career ==
Sankar Venkateswaran (b. 1979), is a theatre director from India. Born in Calicut, Kerala, Venkateswaran studied directing at the School of Drama and Fine Arts, University of Calicut, after which he trained at the Theatre Training and Research Programme (currently Intercultural Theatre Institute) in Singapore. He founded Theatre Roots & Wings in 2007 and directed a number of productions including Richard Murphet’s “Quick Death” (2007), “Sahyande Makan- The Elephant Project” (2008), Shogo Ohta’s “The Water Station” (2011), which was re-created in 2016 with Kyoto Performing Arts Center, and presented at Kyoto Experiment Autumn 2016, Henrik Ibsen’s “When We Dead Awaken” (2012), and “101 Lullabies” (2012). In 2013 he received the Ibsen Scholarship from Teater Ibsen, Norway, for ‘Tribal Ibsen Project’ which furthered his work with the indigenous communities in Attappady, Kerala. He built a theatre in the region, named Sahyande Theatre, and lives and works among the communities. His following works, “Theriyama Nadanda Nera” (2016), and “Udal Uravu (Body/Source)” (2017) reflect the shift in Venkateswaran’s working context. His latest work “Criminal Tribes Act” (2017) was premiered at Zurich Theater Spektakel, and later toured to Spielart Festival, Munich, Tamaasha Studio in Mumbai, Zoukak Sidewalks Festival in Beirut, Serendipity Arts Festival in Goa, Kyoto Performing Arts Center, and Theater Commons Tokyo ‘19.

He was the guest director at Munich Volkstheater in the year 2016 and 2017 and directed “Tage der Dunkelheit (Days of Darkness)” and “INDIKA”. He has been a guest faculty at various institutions including University of Tokyo, Shinshu University in Nagano, National School of Drama, New Delhi, Ninasam Theatre Institute, Heggodu, Karnataka, where he directed a number of productions including “Neerina Niluthana” (2009), and “Guruthilathe Nadatha Galike” (2013), and Intercultural Theatre Institute, Singapore, where he directed “When We Dead Awaken” (2018). His latest work is a production named "Antharanga" for Ninasam Touring Theatre Company based on Belgian author Maurice Maeterlinck's "The Interior".

He was the jury member for Zurich Theater Spektakel 2016. He served as the artistic director for International Theatre Festival of Kerala (ITFoK) in 2015 and 2016. During his term, the programme emphasized South-South exchanges to resist the Eurocentric agendas of cultural practice.

== Awards ==
Year	Award
2016	Aditya Vikram Birla Kalakiran Puraskar
2013	International Ibsen Scholarship Award
2012	Ustad Bismillah Khan Yuva Puraskar (Excellence in Theatre Direction) from Sangeet Natak Akademi
