= Western Star (Kerala) =

Defunct newspaper published in Cochin

Western Star was an English-language newspaper published from Cochin (part of present-day India). Established in 1860, it was one of the first newspapers in Kerala and the first in the English language. It was owned by Ittiara Writer, Ittoop Writer, Curian Writer and Devji Bhimji. It was the first newspaper in Kerala not under the ownership of missionaries. The first editor was Charles Lawson who later founded the Madras Mail newspaper in Madras. In 1864, a Malayalam counterpart of Western Star named Paschimataraka was also started.

Western Star continued publication from Cochin for many years until it switched to Trivandrum. Its ownership was under Curian Writer's family at this time. It continued publication until the 1930s.
