= International Theatre Festival of Kerala =

Theatre festival

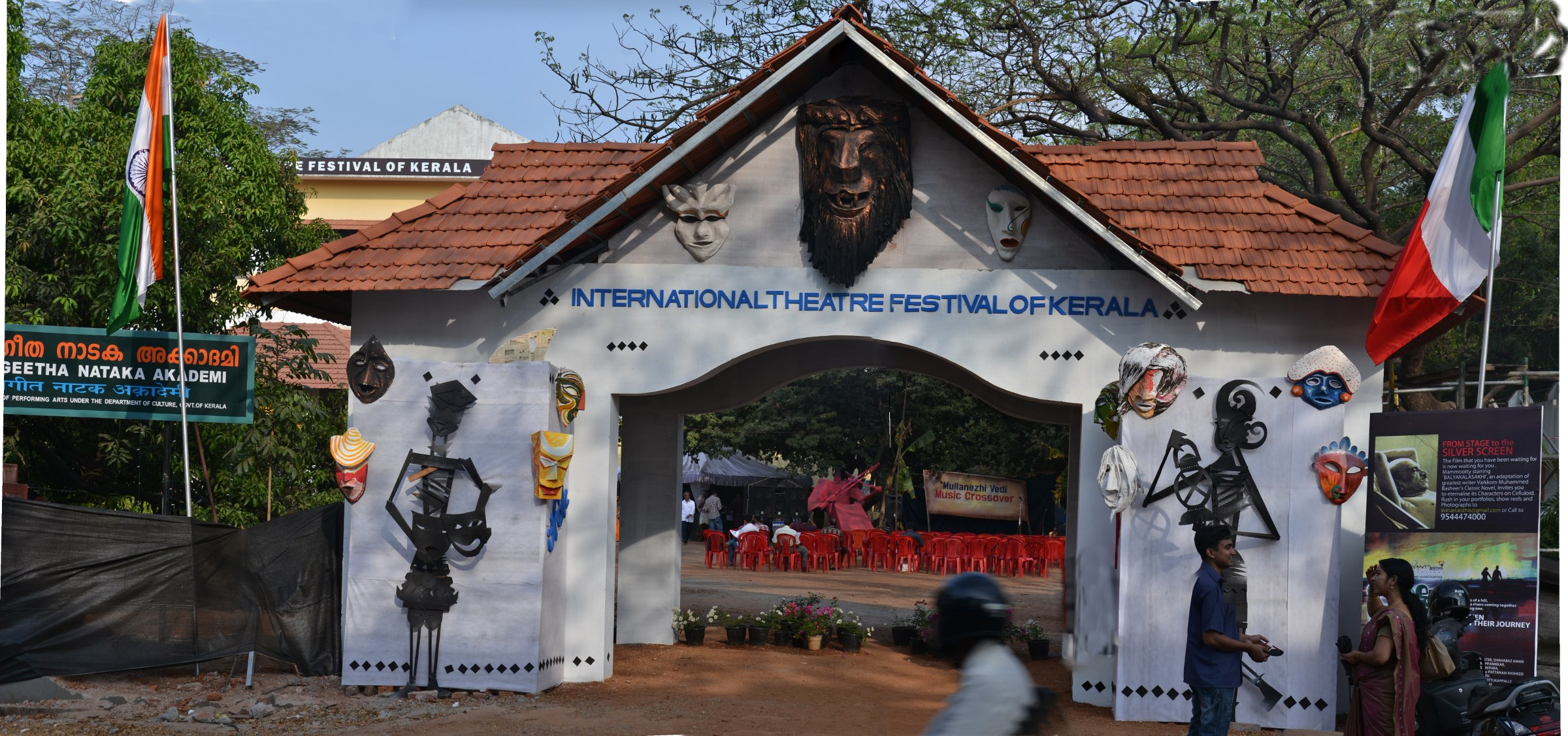
- Genre: Theatre
- Dates: Second week of January
- Location: Thrissur city
- Years active: Since 2008
- Founded: 2008

The International Theatre Festival of Kerala (ITFoK) is an international theatre festival held every year in December in Thrissur city of Kerala State, India. The festival is organised by Kerala Sangeetha Nataka Akademi and the Cultural Department of the Government of Kerala. The festival was started in 2008.

== History ==
Kerala Sangeetha Nataka Akademi founded ITFoK in 2008 in Thrissur city, under the leadership of Murali. Independent, experimental and contemporary theatre groups from around the world participate in this festival.

== Venues ==
The festival is held in the G. Sankara Pillai Cultural Complex in Thrissur city over eight days. The main stages are the Murali Outdoor Theatre and the K. T. Muhammed Regional Theatre.

== See also ==
- List of theatre festivals
