= Aazhi Archives =

Art and research collective based in Kochi, India

Aazhi Archives ആഴി ആർക്കൈവ്‌സ്
- Genre: The collective engages in education and art projects through research, art-making, writing, curating, and publications.
- Locations: Kochi, Kerala, India
- Founded: 2022
- Website: aazhiarchives.org

Aazhi Archives, founded in 2022 is a collective of artists, writers, and scholars based in Cochin, Kerala, India. The collective engages in education and art projects through research, art-making, writing, curating, and publications. It aims to bring artists and scholars into creative dialogue to explore the cosmopolitan pasts and traditions of the Kerala region. Conceived as both a physical and a digital audio-visual archive, Aazhi Archives documents Kerala's history, culture, politics, and society.

== History ==
Aazhi Archives was established in 2022 by a collective of artists, writers, and scholars based in Cochin, Kerala with Riyas Komu as its artistic director. The initiative was conceived as a platform to foster collaboration between creative practitioners and researchers, with a focus on exploring Kerala's cosmopolitan past and cultural traditions,.

The Archives was envisioned both as a physical space and a digital audio-visual archive, documenting Kerala's history, politics, society, and culture. From its inception, the project emphasized interdisciplinary approaches—combining art-making, writing, research, curation, and education. The project marked the beginning of Aazhi Archives’ efforts to create a sustained platform for artistic and academic engagement with Kerala's histories and its interconnectedness with the wider world.

== Sea A Boiling Vessel ==
The collective's first major initiative, Sea- A Boiling Vessel, opened on 13 December 2022 in Fort Kochi and ran until 30 April 2023. This global art project drew on Kerala's maritime history and the metaphor of the sea as a “boiling vessel,” framing the ocean as a site of exchange, migration, and cultural imagination. Sea—A Boiling Vessel was curated by Aazhi Archives & Uru Art Harbour with academic collaboration from institutions such as Mahatma Gandhi University, Kottayam, the Kerala Council for Historical Research (KCHR), I-Shore, the University of Witwatersrand, Johannesburg, and the Nirox Foundation. As part of the initiative, the project hosted residencies, seminars, workshops, and exhibitions, bringing together artists, thinkers, and writers to engage with maritime histories and to generate new cultural, artistic, and political imaginaries.
