= Vayala Vasudevan Pillai =

Indian playwright

Vayala Vasudevan Pillai (22 April 1945 – 29 August 2011) was a Malayalam-language playwright from Kerala, India. He was the disciple of eminent playwright G. Sankara Pillai. He directed over 40 plays. Some of his popular plays include Viswadarsanam (1977), Thulaseevaram (1979), Agni (1982), Rangabhasha (1984), Varavelpu (1985), Kuchelagadha (1988), The Death of Nestling (1992), Suthradhara, Ethile... Ethile? (1993), Kunji Chirakukal (1994), and Swarnakokkukal (1999).

His work Agni won the Kerala Sahitya Akademi Award in 1981. He received the Kerala Sangeetha Nataka Akademi Award in 2002 and the Kendra Sangeet Natak Akademi Award in 2009 for his contributions to theatre - playwriting in Malayalam. He was the director of School of Drama, Thrissur for more than two decades.

== Biography ==
He was born on 22 April 1945 in Vayala, near Anchal, Kollam, Kerala as the son of Neelakanta Pillai and Kalyani Amma. Pillai had his elementary school from Narayana Vilasam Upper Primary School (NVUPS) Vayala. Pillai completed his degree and masters in English literature from Mar Ivanios College. On completion of his post-graduation, he entered the profession of teaching at Mar Ivanios College and proceeded to do his doctorate in Theatre and Drama. He was awarded theatre fellowships of various countries and was able to do research in theatre in well-known universities such as University of Rome (1980–81) and New York University (1989-90). He was also a visiting professor of theatre in Meiji University, Tokyo. In 2001, Vayala researched on 'The Semiotics of Beckett's Plays' at the Paris University and on 'Space in Greek Classical Theatre' at University of Athens in 2008. He also specialised on the works of Irish playwright J. M. Synge. In 2012, he received the Kerala Sangeetha Nataka Akademi Fellowship.

A disciple of eminent playwright G. Sankara Pillai, Vayala was groomed by the Kalari theatre movement started by Sankara Pillai. Vayala joined the School of Drama, Thrissur as assistant director and head of the department in 1984. Later, he succeeded Sankara Pillai as director of the School of Drama and retired from the post in 2005.

During his stint in Thiruvananthapuram, Vayala formed an avant-garde theatre troupe named Suvarnarekha. The troupe presented more than 30 plays, including his own works and modern European plays.

Vayala Vasudevan Pillai died at a private hospital in Kochi, Kerala on 29 August 2011. He had been undergoing treatment for cancer. He was survived by wife, Valsala, and they do not have children.
