= Abhilash Pillai =

Director (b. 1969)

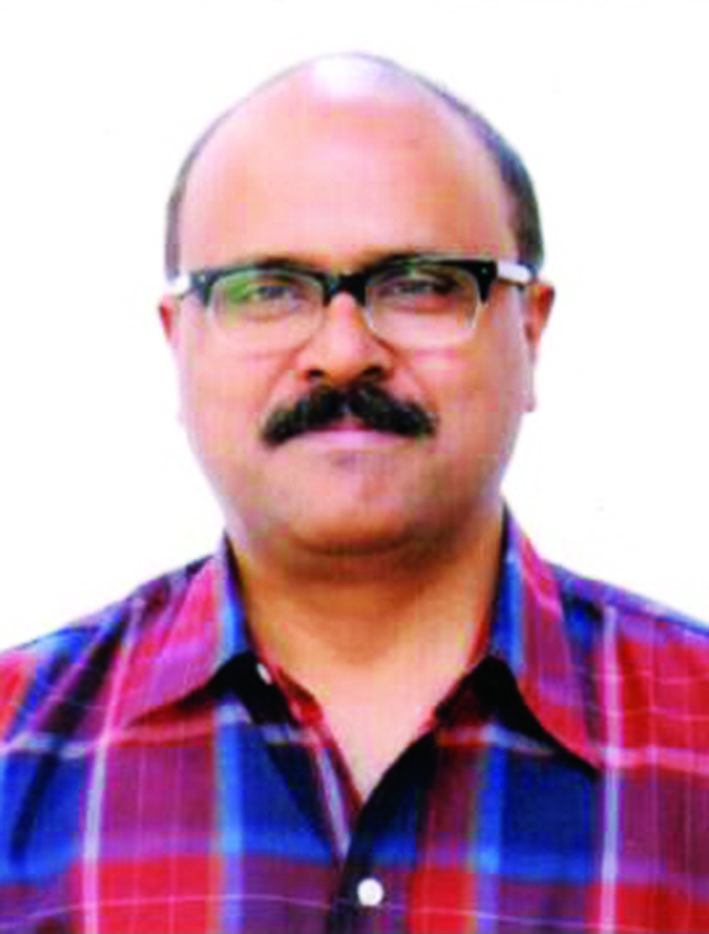
- Born: Abhilash Pillai; 17 May 1969 (age 57); Thiruvananthapuram, Kerala, India
- Education: National School of Drama, New Delhi; Royal Academy of Dramatic Art, London
- Occupations: Theatre director; Scenographer; Academic

Abhilash Pillai (born 17 May 1969) is an Indian theatre director, both pedagogue and scholar of contemporary Indian theatre.

== Early life and education ==
Abhilash Pillai was born on 17 May 1969 at Thiruvananthapuram to S. R. K. Pillai and Sarada Pillai. In 1991, he completed his Bachelor of Theatre Arts from The School of Drama and Fine Arts, University of Calicut and secured third rank. He also completed a three-year Postgraduate Diploma in Dramatics with a specialization in Design and Direction from the National School of Drama, New Delhi, with distinction in 1994. He then obtained a two-year diploma in Theatre Production and Stage Management with honors from the Royal Academy of Dramatic Arts, London in 1998. He also did a one-year intensive training in advanced theatre direction in association with eminent directors in the Orange Tree Theatre, United Kingdom during 1998 and 1999 and attained his PhD from Jawaharlal Nehru University, New Delhi in 2012.

== Career ==
Pillai began his career in theatre as an artistic director at the Abhinaya Theatre and Research Centre, Thiruvananthapuram in Kerala. He worked there from September 1999 to April 2001. Later, he was appointed as an assistant professor at National School of Drama, New Delhi and rose to become the dean of academics from July 2008 to June 2011 and 2019 to 2021. In 2016 he became an associate professor at the National School of Drama. Presently, he is a visiting faculty/play director at many universities in India and abroad. He is also the chairman of Arnav Art Trust since 2011 and a committee member of Natrang Pratishtan, New Delhi. He works as a professor at National School of Drama and he is also executive director of the Asia Theatre Education Center (ATEC) Central Academy Of Drama, Beijing, China.

== Major directorial works ==
Year	Title	Dramaturge	Production company	Premier Show
2016	Talatum	Sasikumar. V	Tempest with a Twist by Sasikumar. V combining Theatre actors & circus performers in a circus tent	Serendipity Art Trust,
2009	ara Ek Bada Basheer (A Bit Big Basheer)	Rajesh Tailang combining seven works of Malayalam Novelist Vaikom Muhammed Basheer in Hindi	National School of Drama	National School of Drama
2009	Helen	Sujith Shankar(translated by Rajesh Tailang)	Japan Foundation Asia	Japan, Korea & Bharat Rang Mahotsav
2006	Midnight's Children	Salman Rushdie's novel co-adapted and translated into Hindustani by Himanshu B Joshi	National School of Drama	Abhimanch Auditorium New Delhi & Bharat Rang Mahotsav,
2005	Shakuntala	Russian language (a Sanskrit classical play) by Kālidāsa	Russian Academy of Theatre Arts- (GITIS)	Moscow
2000	Things Can Change in a Day	Drawn from 'The God of Small Things' of Arundhati Roy	Abhinaya Theatre Research Centre	Thiruvananthapuram

== Awards ==
- 2003 – National Sanskriti Award 2002–03 (National Cultural Award) for achievements in theatre in December 2003 by Sanskriti Pratishtan, New Delhi
- 2012 – Kerala Sangeetha Nataka Akademi Award for Theatre Direction
