= N. N. Pillai =

Indian playwright and actor

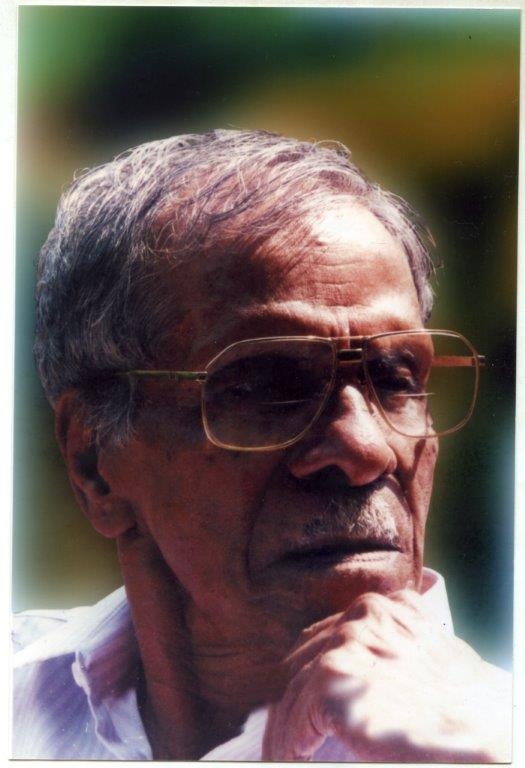
- Pillai
- Born: Narayana Pillai Narayana Pillai; 23 December 1918; Vaikom, Travancore, British India (Present day, Vaikom, Kottayam district, India)
- Died: 14 November 1995 (aged 76); Kottayam, Kerala, India
- Occupations: Actor, playwright, theater director, orator, lyricist, commanding officer in I.N.A Field Propaganda Unit
- Spouse: Chinnamma(Kalyanikutti Amma)
- Children: Vijayaraghavan

N. N. Pillai (Narayana Pillai Narayana Pillai; 1918–1995) was an Indian playwright, actor, theatre director, orator, screenplay writer, lyricist and an I.N.A Freedom fighter. He served as Commanding Officer of Field Propaganda Unit under Netaji Subhas Chandra Bose in INA – Indian National Army. He has been given the title “Nadakacharyan” of Malayalam Theatre. through his contributions to theater as a playwright, director, actor and a producer.

He started his drama troupe “Viswa Kerala Kala Samithi” in 1952. He has produced 23 full-length plays, 40 one act plays, 2 theatrical studies and his autobiography “Njan” meaning “I”. His plays, which question the socio political injustice, hypocrisy and corruptions in society, include Kapalika, Cross Belt, Prethalokam, Dam, Vishamavritham, Easwarn Arrestil, Guerilla, Supreme Court and Njan Swargathil.

== Early and personal life ==
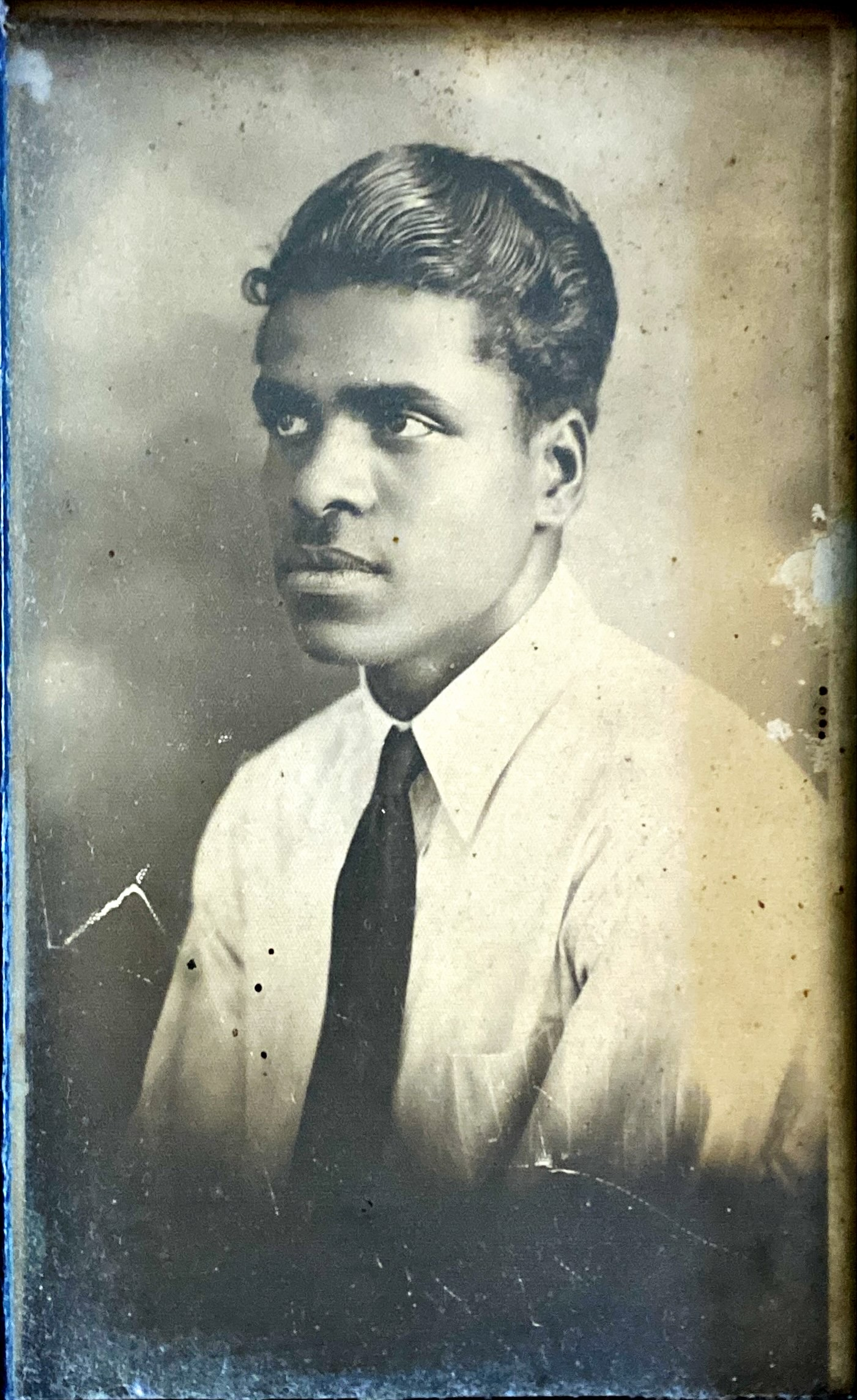
Pillai as a 19 year old

Pillai was born on 23 December 1918 at Vaikom, Thalayazham to Keettuparambil Narayana Pillai and Thethathil Parukkutty Amma (Parvathi). His father was a village officer. Due to his father's official transfer he studied in different places in central Kerala. He had a taste for literature at a very early age which he gives credit to his mother. He started reading books at the age of 6 and by the age of 12; he had memorized 5000 plus Akshara Slokams and poems and had won many competitions. Languages, history, philosophy and human civilizations were his favorite subjects. He did his intermediate from CMS College Kottayam but failed in the exams. He went to Malaysia at the age of 19, in search of a job where he worked as a Journalist (sub-editor for Kerala Bandhu Daily and Staff Reporter for Singapore Herald), estate manager and medical dresser and later joined INA during World War II. During his stint in Malaysia, he became a reader of English books and novels. He mastered Malayan and Japanese language during this period. While working as a journalist he interviewed hollywood actor Paul Muni in Singapore.

During the Second World War, he was part of the Field Propaganda Unit as Commanding Officer of a 58-member Team of INA. After dissolution of INA he returned to India in 1946 and married Chinnamma. He became popular and recognized as an INA freedom fighter and was appointed the Travancore State Secretary of INA Relief fund under Pattom Thanu Pillai. Along with his wife and elder daughter, he went to British Malaya again where he worked for four years as an estate manager and medical dresser. He himself took birth of his son Vijayaraghavan while working in an estate in Malaya.

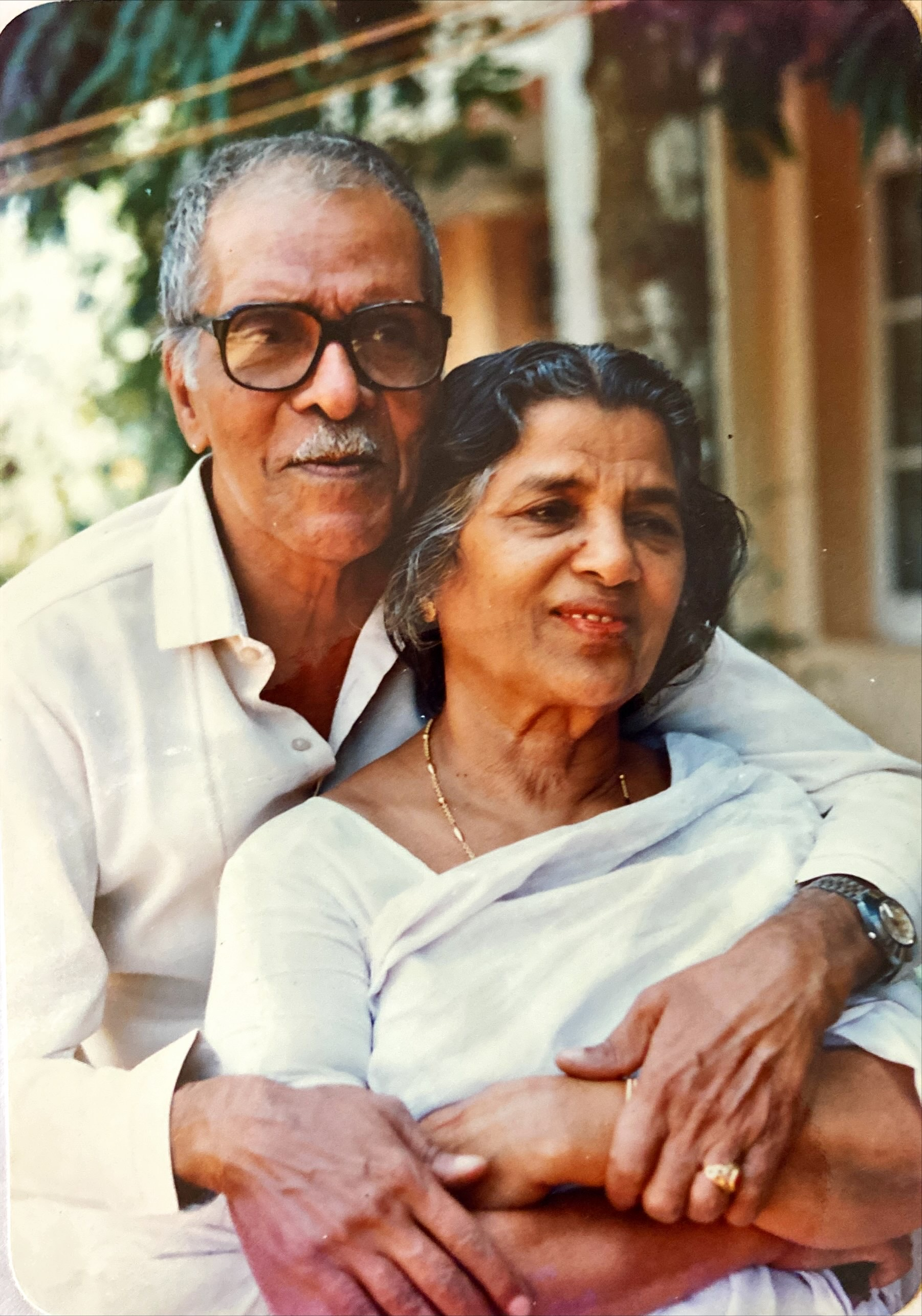
Pillai with his wife Chinnamma

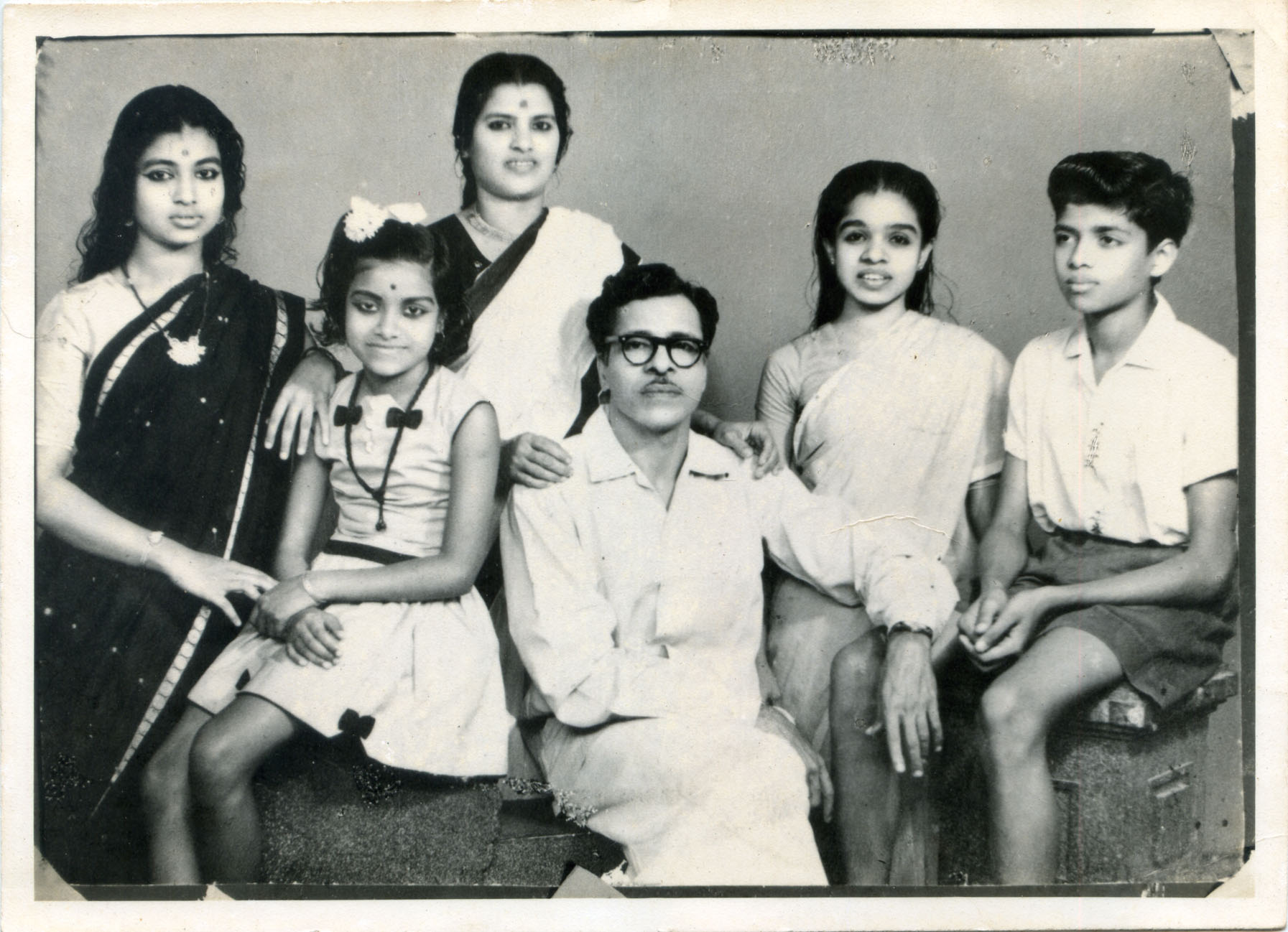
Pillai's family, his wife, son Vijayaraghavan and daughters

His family includes son Vijayaraghavan, who is a Malayalam film actor.

== Stint With INA ==
While working in Malaysia as a journalist and estate supervisor in 1942, he was attracted by the patriotic and freedom movements, the Indian Independence League and the Indian National Army. He left his estate job and joined INA in Gafar company Platoon II under Platoon Commander Major Somasundaram as Nayik/ soldier. After few months of training he was moved to Field Propaganda Unit named "Azad Hind Dal" formed under guidance of Netaji Subhash Chandra Bose in Singapore. He was elevated to the rank of Commanding officer of a 58 member unit. His troop was moved to Mergui and later to Rangoon as a backup for the Imphal war. During his association with Netaji once he asked him about the trustworthiness of the Japanese army, for which Netaji replied "If required the guns can be used for firing backwards also". After dissolution of the I.N.A in 1945 by Netaji, pillai was taken to Calcutta by the British army, where he managed to escape en route to the prison and returned to his native, Kottayam. In-spite of being the commanding officer for a Unit and the secretary of I.N.A Travancore state relief fund he has never availed any pension or grants for his services.

== Theatre and movies ==
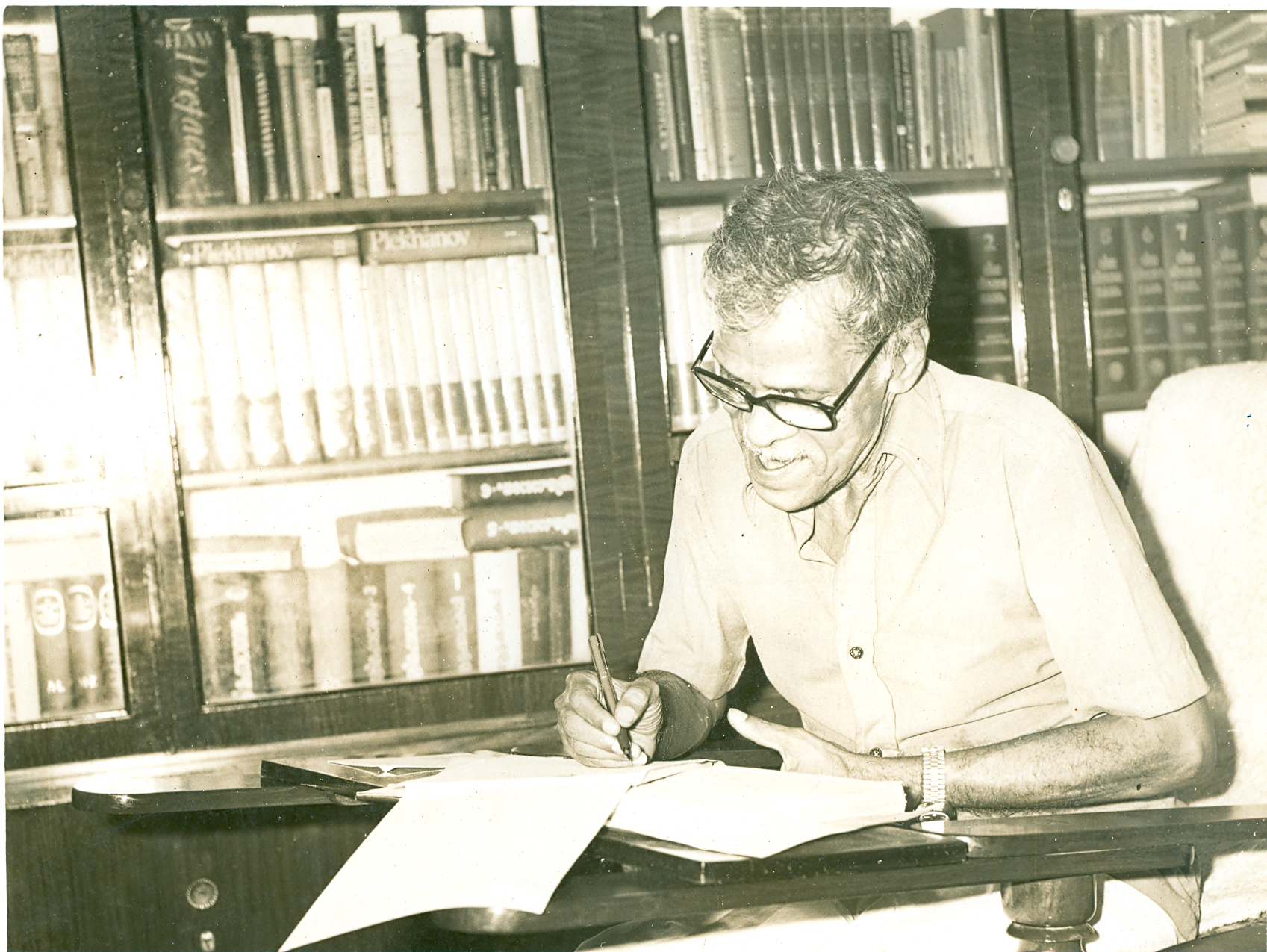
Pillai writing

Pillai started his drama troupe called Viswa Kerala Kala Samithi in 1952 under the presence of acclaimed poet Vallathol Narayana Menon. Manushyan meaning Human was the first drama staged by Viswa Kerala Kala Samithi. Pillai and his family members performed in all his dramas making it a family affair. The initial dramas he had written were during his stint in INA at the age of 24 which upheld patriotism and national pride. Tantia Tope was the first play written and directed by him in which he played the role of thantia thope. The play was written in English. It was translated into various languages and staged in military camps in INA. Qurbani was the second drama he had written under Netaji's instruction, which was staged in front of Netaji Subhas Chandra Bose while in Ragoon camp.

Later while working as a teacher for a short stint in Kililoor Sanskrit school, Kottayam in 1946 he had written a one-act play: Aa Ottu Company Mathiyarunnu for the schools annual day and was staged by students of the school under his direction. All his plays addressed the social inequality, injustice, corruption and hypocrisy. His wife Chinnamma, sister G.Omana (winner of Kerala state award for best actress – theatre) played in his plays. His troupe Viswa Kerala Kala Samithi staged his plays until 2005, by his son Vijayaraghavan and son-in-law Rajendra Babu.

Some of his plays are Easwaran Arrestil, Kapalika, Supreme Court,Prethalokam, Gorilla, Folydol, Kanakku Chembakaraman and Cross Belt. His plays Kapalika and Cross Belt were remade into movies. Pillai also acted in movies in Malayalam, Kapalika, Godfather and Naadody Godfather was also remade into Telugu and Tamil where he acted in the same role in all these languages.

A stone monument made of Krishnashila stone depicting a theatre is built at his residence Olassa, Kottayam in 1996. Every year, a gathering of family members and admirers lights lamp and shower flowers at the monument on 14 November, the day of his death. Cultural personalities are honored and young talents are awarded by NN Pillai foundation formed by his son Vijayaraghavan and Daya Samskarika Vedhi, Kodayampady, Kottayam on the same day.

Every year since 2012, a fortnight long drama festival is conducted by Chorus arts society Maniyattu, Kasargod district in November in remembrance of Pillai. The festival ends with honoring the best play, playwright, actor and actress.

== Awards and accolades ==
- Kerala Sahithya Academy Award for the Best Play in 1967 for "Prethalokam"
- Kerala Education Society (Delhi) award in 1967
- Kerala Sangeetha Nataka Akademi Award in 1969 for Acting
- Malayala Nadu Award in 1970 for Best Dramatist
- Kerala sahithya Academy Award in 1971 for 'Nadakadarpanam"
- Best Playwright Award for his drama "Manwantharam" by Amateur cultures Trivandrum in 1975
- Abhudhabi Malayali Samajam Sahithya award for his Autobiography "Njan" Award in 1982
- Kerala State Award in 1990 for his contribution to theatre.
- Sri Swathi Thirunal Sangeeta Sabha Award in 1991 for his works in theatre
- Prof. Krishna Pillai Foundation Award in 1992 for his excellence in theatre
- Sreerangom award in 1992 for his contribution to Malayalam theatre
- Kerala Sangeetha Nataka Akademi Fellowship in 1992 for his contribution to Malayalam drama

== Filmography ==
- 1973 – Kaapalika as Lazar
- 1991 – Godfather as Anjooran
- 1992 – Naadody as Prabhakara Menon
- 1992 – Peddarikam (Telugu) as Parvathaneni Parasuramayya
