= P. M. Taj =

Indian writer

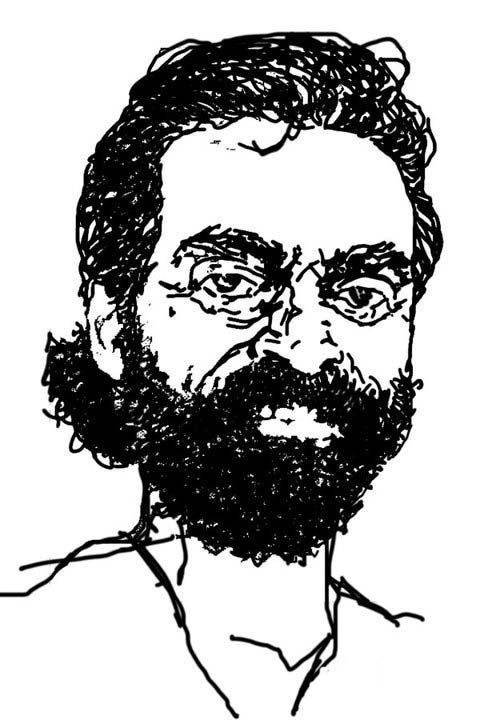
- Born: Puthiyara Maliyakkal Taj; 3 January 1956; Kozhikode, Kerala, India
- Died: 29 July 1990 (aged 34)
- Occupations: Playwright, script writer, actor, director
- Writing career
- Language: Malayalam
- Genres: Fiction, humour, non-fiction

Puthiyara Maliyakkal Taj (3 January 1956 – 29 July 1990), popularly known as P. M. Taj, was an Indian creative writer, actor, screenwriter, and director in Malayalam theatre. Taj wrote many plays during his short span of life and won several awards including the Sakthi Award, instituted in memory of the progressive Malayalam writer Cherukad, and the Kerala Sangeetha Nataka Akademi Award twice.

== Selected works ==
His plays include: “Kudukka Athava Vishakkunnavante Vedantam, Kanallattom, Ravvunni, Pavathan Nadu, Perumbara, Mary Lawrence, Thalasthanathuninn Oru Vaarthayumilla, Kurukan Kunjaammante Vaal, Perumkallan, Priyapetta Avivahidhan, Chakram, Aalmarattam, Ambalakaalla, Uthram Thirunallinte Kalpana Pole, Ennum Ennum Priyapetta Amma, and Agraharam.

=== Films ===
- Uyarum Njan Nadake (1985)
- Atham Chitira Chothy (1986)
- Kurukkan Rajavayi (1987)
- P.C. 369 (1987)
- Njan Piranna Nattil (1985)
- Bali (1991)

== Awards and recognitions ==
- Kerala Sangeetha Nataka Akademi Award in 1982 for Kudukka the gospel of hungry man
- Cherukaad Smaraka Shakthi Award in 1983
- Akilendhya Nadaka Award in 1983
- Kerala Sangeetha Nadaka Academy Award in 1989 for Paavathan Naad
- Calicut University took Perumbara as reference book in 1990
- Kerala University took Kudukka The gospel of hungry man as reference book in 2011

== Bibliography ==
- "Remembering PM Taj". The Hindu. 26 July 2016. Archived from the original on 19 January 2025.
- Borne artiste. Indian Express. 11 August 1990. Calicut.
- "A journey through history". The Hindu. 11 August 2003. Archived from the original on 9 November 2012.
- Mega Jyothisudhan kshanika jeevitham, K.F George, Malayala Manorama, 28 August 1990, Calicut.
- Dhuranthangal irannu vaagiya oru kalaakaran. Madhyamam. 11 August 1990. Caliciut.
- Neru Kanda ee Kannukall porullarinja ee hridhayam. K.S. Hariharan. Deshabhimani. 3 August 1990. Calicut.
- Staff Reporter (26 July 2006). "Theatre festival in memory of P.M. Taj". The Hindu. Archived from the original on 28 August 2006.
- "Best of theatre on show at festival". The Hindu. 28 March 2011. Archived from the original on 2 April 2011. The Hindu. Monday, 28 March 2011
- "Taj theatre fete begins". The Hindu. 27 July 2010. Archived from the original on 31 July 2010. The Hindu. 27 July 2010. Retrieved 20 April 2011
- "taj akalathil annanjupoya thejwala". Deshabhimani. 30 July 1999.
- A.K. Ramesh (5 August 1990). "Aa nakshthram veennu poyirikkunnu". Deshabhimani.
- A.R. Mohanan (29 July 1991). "taj ninte vellicham mangiyittilla". Kerala Kaumudi.
- "ormakil niranja taj". Malayala Manorama. 29 July 2006.
- "tajinte rachanakal vimochanathinte ithu savageetham". Deshabhimani. 1 September 1990.
- K.S. Hariharan (4 August 1991). "ravunniyudey chiri". Deshabhimani.
- K. T. Muhammed (25 July 2004). "p.m taj enna nadaka prathibha". mathrubhumi.
- "janakiyanataka prasthanathinte chithanyadharayil taj smaranna". Deshabhimani. 31 July 1993.
- "nagarathil ormakal niraye taj". Malayala Manorama. 28 July 2006.
- M. N. Vijayan (29 July 1991). "taj kavivargathinte oru adayallam". Deshabhimani.
- Muralitharan Parayanjeri (13 August 1997). "taj ninte kaalam theaterinte vasanthamayirinnu". Prathibham.
- Sudeer Ambalappad (26 July 1996). "taj -oru prathbhasam". Calicut Times.
- T.K (29 July 1991). "taj kandhadharshiyaya nadakakrth". Deshabhimani.
- sree (19 July 1993). "tajiney pole taj maathram". Times.
