= G. Sankara Pillai =

Indian playwright

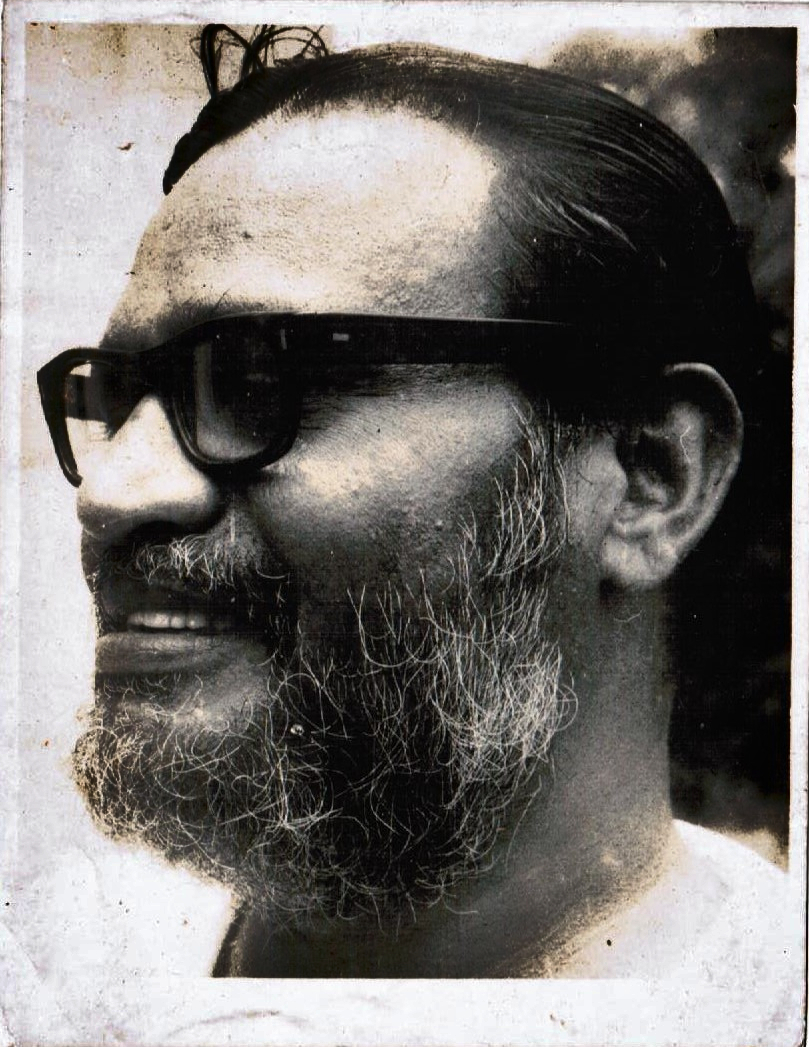
- G Sankara Pillai
- Born: 22 June 1930; Chirayinkeezhu, Thiruvananthapuram, Kerala, India
- Died: 1 January 1989 (aged 58); Kerala
- Occupations: Playwright, literary critic
- Writing career
- Genres: Theatre, literary criticism
- Notable works: Rail Palangal; Mrugathrushna; Snehadoothan; Malayala Nataka Sahithya Charitram
- Notable awards: 1964 Sangeet Natak Akademi Award; 1964 Kerala Sahitya Akademi Award for Drama; 1967 Sahitya Pravartaka Sahakarana Sanghom Award; All India Critics Award; Nandikar National Award; Nehru Fellow (1985–1987); Bombay Keraleeya Samaj Award; Sahithya Parishat Award; All India Radio Best Play Wright Award

Gopala Pillai Sankara Pillai (22 June 1930 – 1 January 1989), better known as G. Sankara Pillai, was an Indian playwright, literary critic, and director, known to be one of the pioneers of modern Malayalam theatre. A proponent of total theater, he was the founder of Nataka Kalari movement in Kerala and the chairman of the Kerala Sangeeta Nataka Akademi. He was a recipient of a number of awards including the Kerala Sahitya Akademi Award for Drama in 1964 for the work Rail Palangal (Railway track) and the Sangeet Natak Akademi Award for the best playwright in 1979.

== Biography ==
Mahatma Gandhi University - Entrance

Pillai was born on 22 June 1930, at Naluthattuvila in Chirayinkeezhu taluk in Thiruvananthapuram district of the south Indian state of Kerala to Ottaveettil V. Gopala Pillai and Muttaykkal Kamalakshi Amma. After completing his schooling from Kollam, Chirayinkeezhu, Attingal and Thiruvananthapuram, He passed post-graduation from the Travencore university (Present day kerala university) in Malayalam literature with honours in 1952, securing the first rank. From 1953 to 1960 he worked in various colleges including Gandhigram rural institute in Madurai as a lecturer.

After working in the lexicon office of the Kerala University from 1961 to 1964. He was appointed as a professor in devaswam board college (Shasthamcotta) in 1967. Where he continued until 1977.

He joined the University of Kerala for research on the folk music tradition of Kerala in 1954. In 1957, he moved to Madurai to take up the position as a teacher at the Gandhigram Rural Institute and stayed there until his move to the Lexicon Office in 1961.

Three years later, Pillai returned to academics when Dewaswom Board College, Sasthamcotta was established in 1964 by joining the institution as a faculty.

He was a member of board of studies and fine arts faculty in Kerala university, Calicut university, Gandhigram and Tanjaore university. Was also a member of the curriculum development committee constituted by UGC for fine arts.

Later, he became the founder director of the School of Drama and Fine Arts of the University of Calicut when the school was established in 1977. The Mahatma Gandhi University established the School of Letters, an interdisciplinary centre of literary studies and research, in 1988 and U. R. Ananthamurthy, noted Kannada writer and the then vice chancellor of the university invited Pillai to head the institution. He was holding the position while he died in harness on the New Year's Day of 1989, at the age of 58. He remained a bachelor throughout his life.

Sankarapillai showcased his acting prowess in Adoor Gopalakrishnan's much-acclaimed movie 'Swayamvaram' (One's Own Choice) and in another movie produced by Madhu, 'Sathi', which was loosely based on Shankarapillai's drama called 'Poojaamuri' (Prayer Room).

== Legacy ==
Pillai was one of pioneers of modern Malayalam theatre and an advocate of total theater, he helped introduce a system and academic discipline to it. One of his main contributions was in the initiation of the Nataka Kalari Movement in Kerala in 1967, along with C. N. Sreekantan Nair, M. Govindan, M. V. Devan, K. S. Narayana Pillai and K. Ayyappa Paniker, which nurtured several theatre practitioners such as Vayala Vasudevan Pillai and helped revive a number of earlier dramas such as Avan Veendum Varunnu of C. J. Thomas in a new form. The movement staged weekly plays in Kochi and introduced courses n theatre which was later taken up by a playhouse movement, Vaikkom Thirunal Natakavedi, based in Vaikkom. It was this movement which influenced the establishment of the School of Drama and Fine Arts of the University of Calicut in 1977 where he served as the founder director. He was also the founder director of the School of Letters of Mahatma Gandhi University and he chaired the Kerala Sangeetha Nataka Akademi, served as a member of the executive council of the National School of Drama and sat in the advisory board of the University Grants Commission of India.

Pillai visited Russia in 1977 as part of a cultural delegation send by government of India. Again visited Tashkent as part of Indian Sangeetha Nataka academy contingent as part of the festival of India. Visited United Kingdom in 1986-87 as part of on a British council invitation and in 1987–88, in connection with a joint play production project and co-directed a play in London named ‘The exile in the forest’.

Pillai's first work was a one-act play titled Snehadoothan (Messenger of Love), published in 1956. This was followed by 43 plays and 11 books of essay compilations. Vivaham Swargathil Nadakkunnu (1958) (Marriages happen in heaven), Bharatha Vakyam, Kiratham, Thirumbi Vandan Thambi (The brother who returned), Raksha Purushan (The rescuer), Bandi (The hostage), Sharashayanam (Bed of arrows), Poymukhangal (Masked faces), Kauzhukanmar (The eagles), Vilangum Veenayum, Peipidicha lokam (The world gone mad), Dharmakshetre Kurukshetre, Olapambu (Fake Snake), Pushpakireedam (Floral Crown), Nizhal (The Shadow), Gurudakshina (Offering to the Master), Nidhiyum Neethiyum (Treasure and Justice), Maddalangal (Drums), Rail Palangal (Rail Tracks), Ponnumkudam (Golden Pot), Chithra Salabhangal (Butterflies), Thamara (Lotus) and Orukoottam Urumbukal (A Group of Ants) are some of his major plays while The Theater of the Earth is Never Dead, Selected essays of G. Sankara Pillai, Ibsante Nataka Sankalpam, Njan Kanda Delhi (The Delhi I saw), Bertolt Brecht, Nataka Paramparyangal (Drama and heritage), Samvidhayaka Sankalpam (The concept of a director), C. V. yude Hasya Sankalpam (C. V.’s Concept of Humour), Malayala Nataka Sahithya Charitram (The history of Malayalam Drama) and G. Sankara Pillayude Lekhanangal (Collection of articles by G. Sankara Pillai) are some of his works of prose, of which Malayala Nataka Sahithya Charitram is considered as an authentic work on the history of Malayalam theatre. "Sankara Pillai's efforts rendered the stage and theatre actors a dignity that was lacking until then", said Sajitha Madathil, on the occasion of the 25th death anniversary of Sankara Pillai.

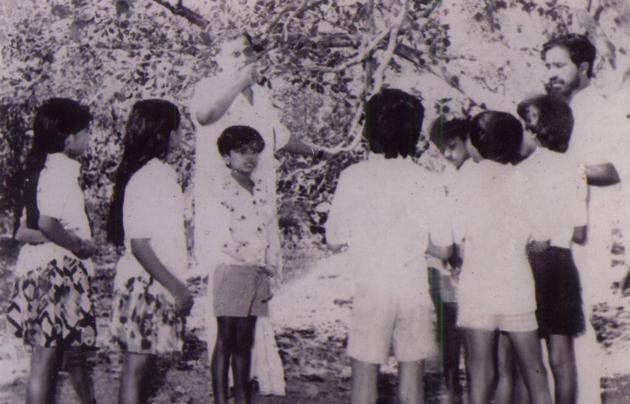
Pillai at the first theatre workshop for children at Rangaprabhath in 1980. Dr N Radhakrishnan of Gandhi Smrithi Darshan Samithi also can be seen.

== Awards and honours ==
Sakara Pillai received the Sangeet Natak Akademi Award in 1964 for play-writing; the same year as the Kerala Sahitya Akademi honoured him with their annual award for drama for his work, Rail Palangal. Three years later, he was selected for the 1967 Sahitya Pravartaka Sahakarana Sanghom Award. In 1986, he received the Kerala Sangeetha Nataka Akademi Fellowship. He was also a recipient of the All India Critics Award and the Nandikar National Award. His biography has been included in two Oxford University Press publications, The Oxford Companion to Theatre and Performance and The Oxford Encyclopedia of Theatre and Performance.

== Selected bibliography ==
=== Plays ===
- G. Sankara Pillai (2008). Plavilathoppikal. KSICL. ISBN 978-8184940152.
- G. Sankara Pillai (2008). Orma Kondu Thurakkavunna Vathil. Penguin India. ISBN 978-0143063841.
- G. Sankara Pillai (2008). Sainikante Premalekhanam. DC Books. ISBN 978-8126443109.
- G. Sankara Pillai. Asthanaviddikal. Calicut: Poorna.
- G. Sankara Pillai (1978). Sapthami. Kottayam: S.P.C.S.
- G. Sankara Pillai (1981). Bharatha Vakyam. Translated by K. M. Tharakan. Thrissur: Kerala Sahitya Akademi.
- G. Sankara Pillai (1985). Sarvvam Saha.
- G. Sankara Pillai (1984). Raappakshikal Athavaa Bhagavathipuram Theevandi Stationil Enthu Sambhavichu. Kottayam: DC Books.
- G. Sankara Pillai (1986). Moodhevi Theyyam. Kottayam: Sahitya Pravarthaka Co-operative Society.
- G. Sankara Pillai (1989). Krishnapaksham.
- G. Sankara Pillai (1990). Kaserakali.
- G. Sankara Pillai (1980). Idaan Maranna Izha.
- G. Sankara Pillai (1989). G. Sankara Pillayude Ekaankangal.
- G. Sankara Pillai (1989). Ekaaki.
- G. Sankara Pillai (1968). Dharmakshethre Kurukshethre.
- G. Sankara Pillai (1986). Anchu Ekaankangal.
- G. Sankara Pillai (1981). Thaavalam.
- G. Sankara Pillai (1990). Snehadoothan. Kottayam: National Book Stall.
- G. Sankara Pillai (1963). Sarasayanam.
- G. Sankara Pillai (1990). Sabarmathi Dooreyaanu.
- G. Sankara Pillai (1975). Thirumpivanthaan Thampi (in Malayalam). Kottayam: NBS.
- G. Sankara Pillai (1985). Andanum Atakotanum (in Malayalam). Kottayam: DC Books.
- G. Sankara Pillai (1980). Karutha Daivathe Thedi (in Malayalam). Kottayam: DC Books.

=== Essays ===
- G. Sankara Pillai (1993). V. Rajakrishnan (ed.). G. Sankarapillayute Lekhanangal. Thrissur: Kerala Sahitya Akademi.
- N. Radhakrishnan (1997). Selected Essays of G. Sankara Pillai. Indira Gandhi National Centre for the Arts. ISBN 978-81-224-1081-5.
- G. Sankara Pillai (1990). Nataka Darsanam. Kottayam: DC Books.
- G. Sankara Pillai (1980). Malayala Nadaka Sahithya Charithram. Thrissur: Kerala Sahitya Akademi.
- G. Sankara Pillai (1990). Ibsente Naataka Sankalpam (2nd ed.).
- G. Sankara Pillai (1987). C. V. Yude Haasyasankalpam.
- G. Sankara Pillai (1991). Samvidhaayaka Sankalpam.

=== Translation ===
- Luigi Pirandello (1989). Aaru Kathaapaathrangal Naatakakrthine Thedi. Translated by G. Sankara Pillai.

== See also ==
- List of Malayalam-language authors by category
- List of Malayalam-language authors
