= Shambuka =

Character in Hindu scripture

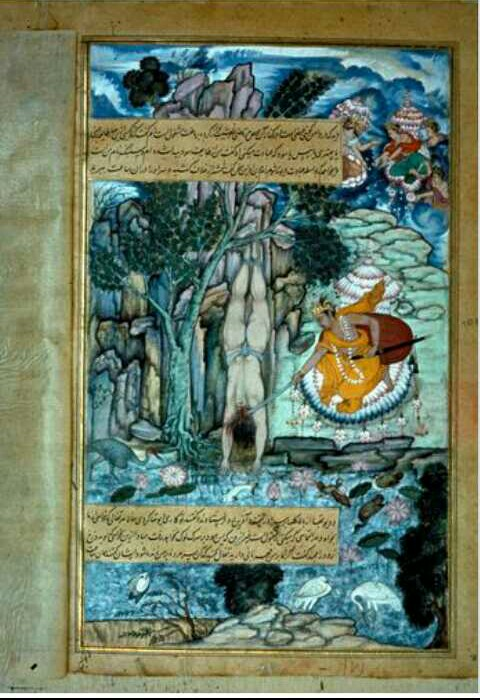
Rama slays Shambuka. Illustration from a Mughal miniature of the Ramayana.

Shambuka (Sanskrit: शम्बूक, IAST: śambūka) is a character in some editions of the Ramayana.

The story is regarded by many scholars to be created at a later period. While the Uttara Kanda (including Shambuka's tale) is generally regarded as a later interpolation to the original epic, the book is considered part of "ongoing Ramayana tradition" and part of the Valmiki Ramayana.

According to these versions, Shambuka, a shudra ascetic, was killed by the god Rama (protagonist of the Ramayana) for attempting to perform tapas (austerities) in violation of dharma, resulting in the bad karma which caused the death of a Brahmin's son.

Shambhuka is alluded in the epic Mahabharata; his story retold in some versions of the Ramayana. In Jain literature, the story of Shambuka is different and he is Surpanakha’s son.

== Legend in the Uttara Kanda of the Ramayana ==
According to this story, when Rama was ruling Ayodhya, a Brahmin approached the court and told everyone that his young son has died due to the misrule of Rama. Rama immediately called a meeting with all his ministers and enquired about the cause of this. The sage Narada told him that this has happened due to a violation of a rule of tapas (austerities). Narada informed him that a shudra was performing tapas, which was prohibited in the age of Treta. So Rama went in search of the shudra and found the place where Shambuka was performing penance. After confirming that Shambuka is indeed a shudra, Rama killed him. The gods praised Rama for this act and congratulated him for protecting their interests and for not allowing shudra to attain heaven in person. Brahmin's son was also resurrected.

The Uttara Kanda - dated to post-Vedic period (3rd to 2nd century BCE) is regarded an interpolation to the original epic.

== Appearance in other texts ==
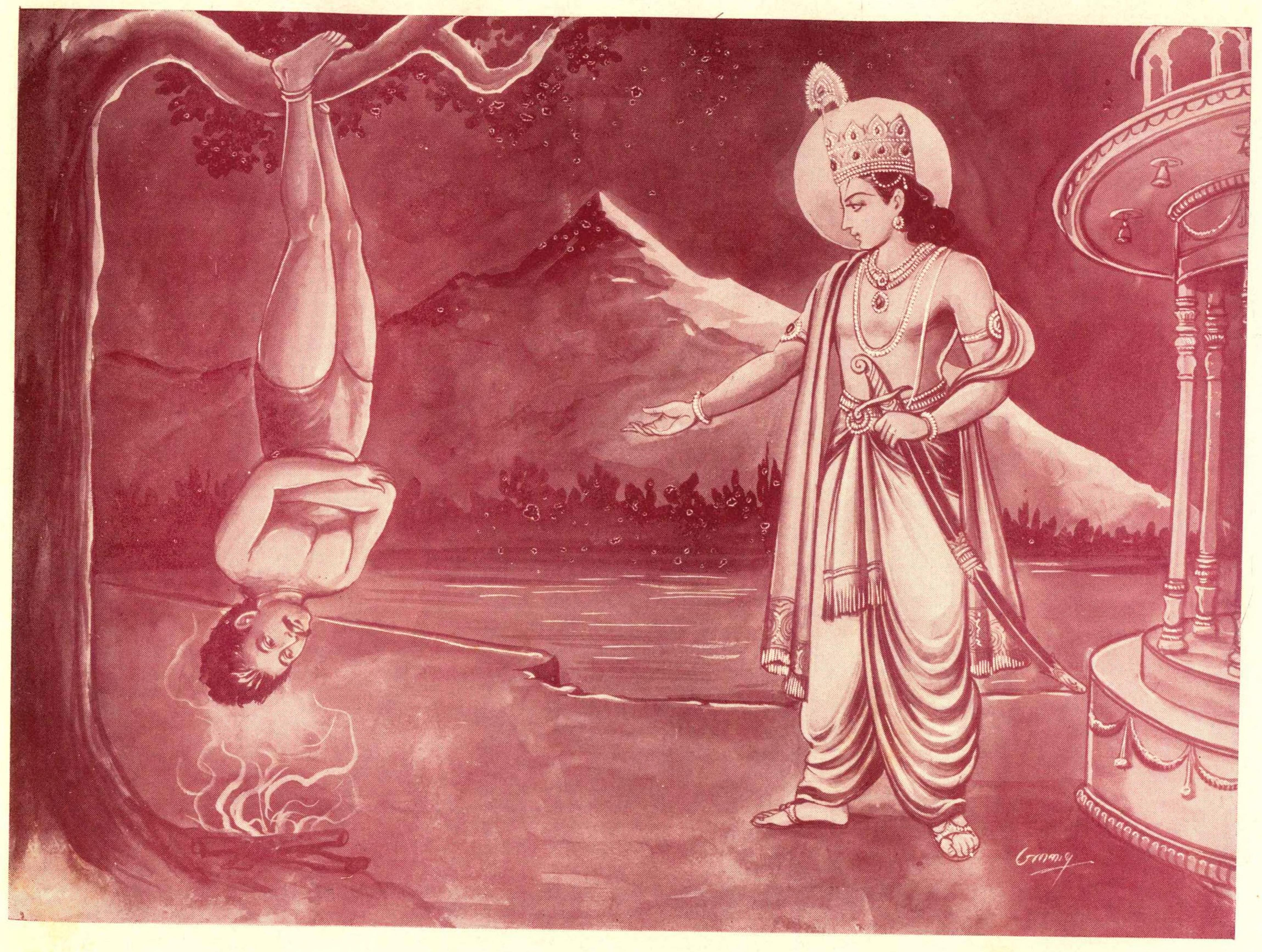
Valmiki Ramayan I Gita Press Gorakhpur by MahaMuni महामुनि का संग्रह"

Shambuka is alluded in 12.149.61.62 in the epic Mahabharata (Principally compiled in 3rd century BCE–4th century CE), in a debate between a jackal and a vulture at a cremation ground. The jackal urges the family of a dead young boy to not abandon him at the cremation ground citing how Rama revives a dead Brahmin boy and slew the sudra Shambuka.

The Shambuka also appears in Raghuvaṃśa, an epic poem composed by celebrated Sanskrit poet Kālidāsa in 5th century CE; Uttaramacarita, a Sanskrit play composed by Bhavabhuti in 7th century CE and the 15th century Sanskrit text Ananda Ramayana. Rama's killing of Shambuka is also mentioned in verse 749 in prabandham 'Perumal Thirumozhi' (sung by Kulasekara Alvar) of Naalayira Divya Prabandham, a collection of 4,000 verses composed by the 12 Alvars. The legend is also covered in the Ramavataram written by Tamil poet Kambar in the 12th century.

This story is missing in later renditions of the Ramayana such as the Ramcharitmanas, written by Tulsidas in the 16th century, which ends with coronation of Rama.

== Reception ==
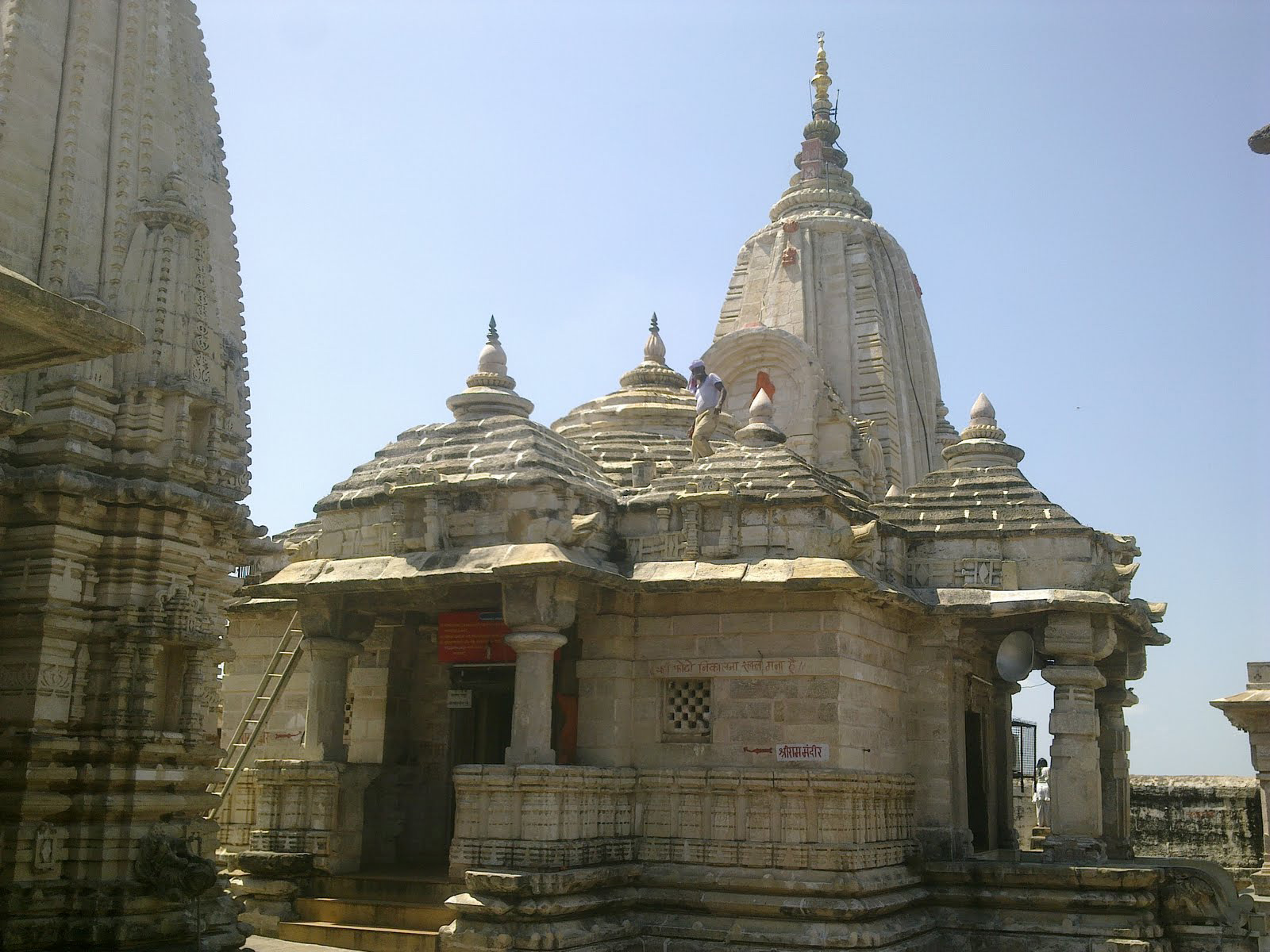
Rama Temple at Ramtek (10th century, restored) owes its origins to Shambuka as per local legend.

According to local temple legend, Rama temple at Ramtek owes its origin to Shambuka. It is believed that Shambuka performed his tapas on Ramtek hill. Rama granted Shambuka three boons at his request: Rama stay in Ramtek (origin of the temple), Shambuka's corpse be turned into a shivalinga (icon of the god Shiva). Devotees worship Shambuka before worshipping Rama, as per the last boon.

Authors such as Rabindranath Tagore, Mahatma Gandhi treat the character of Shambuka as an interpolation and creation of a later period. The Pushtimarg Vaishnavite tradition points out that the Ramayana refers to other shudras, such as Shabari, who lived in the forest. Shambuka therefore deliberately violated dharma in order to get Rama's attention, and attained salvation when he was beheaded.

K.R. Raju termed the story of Shambuka as "frivolous" and "maliciously fabricated".

=== Relationship to Caste System ===
The Shambuka story is connected to discussions of the caste system, because it positively portrays Rama's killing of Shambuka. Shambuka acts outside his caste, so he is a threat to the social order. Rinehart notes that "the Shambuka story is well known to low castes, who identify with the mistreated Shambuka." Similar criticisms have been made for centuries: the eighth-century play Uttararamacharita portrays Rama as regretful, and as forced by duty to kill Shambuka to uphold the social order. The same point was made explicitly in B.R. Ambedkar's essay, Annihilation of Caste, in which he points to Shambuka's story as evidence that the caste system can only be maintained by the threat of lethal force. Indian social activist and politician Periyar vehemently criticized Rama for his mistreatment of the Shudras, citing Shambuka's example.

These themes have appeared in modern literary work in the form of re-tellings of the Shambuka story. Multiple plays have reimagined the story, variously modifying it to depict Rama as a servant of the ruling class (T. Ramaswamy Choudary's Sambuka Vadha (1920)), to have Shambuka act as mouthpiece for anti-caste scholars (Thiruvarur K. Thangaraju's Ramayana Natakam (1954)), or to have Shambuka live and instead help the Brahmin who accused him to achieve enlightenment (Kuvempu's Shudra Tapasvi (1944)). The 1977 film Kanchana Sita, based on a 1961 play by the same name, depicts Rama as caught in inner conflict between moksha (the desire for enlightenment) and artha (the desire for sovereign power).

== In popular culture ==
- Sambuka Vadha ("The Slaying of Sambuka"), a 1920 Telugu play by T. Ramaswamy Choudary
- Shudra Tapasvi ("The Shudra Ascetic") a 1944 play by celebrated Kannada poet Kuvempu.
- 1954 play, Ramayana Natakam ("Ramayana Drama"), by Tamil journalist, playwright, and actor Thiruvarur K. Thangaraju
- Kanchana Sita, a 1961 play by Malayalam playwright C. N. Sreekantan Nair.
- Kanchana Sita, a 1977 film based on the 1961 play of the same name, by Kerala filmmaker Govindan Aravindan.
- Teesri Azadi, a film on caste system depicts the story of Shambuka.
