= Kanchana Sita =

- A screenshot from the film
- Directed by: G. Aravindan
- Screenplay by: G. Aravindan
- Based on: Kanchana Sita by C. N. Sreekantan Nair
- Produced by: K. Ravindran Nair
- Starring: Ramdas; Venkateswarlu; Chinna Pulliah; Kesava Panicker; Krishnan; Pottiah; Rangiah; Siva; Sobha Kiran; Annapurna
- Cinematography: Shaji N. Karun
- Edited by: Ramesan
- Music by: Rajeev Taranath
- Production company: General Pictures
- Release date: 21 December 1978
- Running time: 87 minutes
- Country: India
- Language: Malayalam

Kanchana Sita (Golden Sita) (Malayalam :കാഞ്ചന സീത) is a 1977 Indian Malayalam feature-length film scripted and directed by G. Aravindan. A mythological film, its story was adapted from C. N. Sreekantan Nair's play of the same name, which is a reworking of Valmiki's Ramayana.

The film interprets a story from the Uttara Kanda of the epic poem Ramayana, where Rama sends his wife, Sita, to the jungle to satisfy his subjects. Sita is never actually seen in the film, but her virtual presence is compellingly evoked in the moods of the forest and the elements. The film retells the epic from a feminist perspective. It was shot in the interior tribal areas of Andhra Pradesh. The roles of the epic heroes are played by Rama Chenchu tribal people, who claim lineage to the mythological Rama. Director Aravindan interweaves the Samkhya-Yoga philosophical concepts of Prakriti-Purusha bonds throughout the film.

The film was produced by K. Ravindran Nair under the banner of General Pictures. The film features an original score by classical musician Rajeev Taranath, cinematography by cinematographer-turned-director Shaji N. Karun, editing by Ramesan, and art direction by Artist Namboothiri. The film became a major critical success, although a few mainstream critics panned it. It is credited with being at the forefront of a trend towards independent filmmaking in South India. The film earned Aravindan the National Film Award for Best Direction.

== Plot ==
The film begins with the journey of Rama and Lakshmana to kill Shambuka – the shudra who performs penance – but Shambuka's wife pleads for his life, and he is spared. Rama and Lakshmana return to Ayodhya to face Urmila, the spirited wife of Lakshmana. Rama replies to her reproaches for abandoning Sita in the Dandakaranya forests, through which they have just journeyed, that the husband of Sita is only a servant of the people of Ayodhya.

The next day, Vasishta arrives to suggest that Rama perform the Ashvamedha yaga (the ritual sacrifice of a horse to Agni, the god of fire) but Rama cannot do without his wife by his side. He is averse to taking a second wife, as Vasishta further suggests. The anguish of Rama at this point is juxtaposed with the people of Ayodhya joyously celebrating the harvest.

Bharata, a brother of Rama who had left Ayodhya twelve years ago, returns. He objects to Rama performing the yaga without Sita. Their argument almost culminates in a physical fight, but nature intervenes; the skies open and a cooling rain pours down upon them.

The yaga begins, with Lakshmana accompanying the horse. The horse strays into Valmiki's ashram (hermitage), where Rama's son Lava and Kusha are being brought up. Lava stops the horse and is ready to fight Lakshmana (as the yaga demands). Lakshmana orders that the horse be released, but once again nature takes a hand. Valmiki is strangely moved by what he sees, and he begins to compose the Uttara Rama Charita – the story of Rama.

The horse is led back to Ayodhya, and the ritualistic second stage of the yaga starts. Just then Rama receives the news that Shambuka has resumed his penance, and Lakshmana is despatched to slay the erring shudra. As the ceremony nears completion, Valmiki arrives with Lava and Kusha, but Vasishta debars Valmiki from entering the yagashala. Rama recognises Lava and Kusha as his sons, and takes them to his heart. The joy of Sita, then, is represented in the glorious splendour of nature.

=== Dénouement ===
The film ends with an epilogue depicting Rama's last journey, the Mahaprasthana, as he walks into the river with fire in his hand and becomes one with Sita, the all-pervading nature. When asked whether Rama was really committing suicide, Aravindan replied, "Yes... in all probability. That is what I think. However, his death in Sarayu river is not like any other kind of death. It was a Mahaprasthanam – an event of supreme self-sacrifice and purification, leaving everything behind. Everyone dear to him had gone. He had parted from Lakshmana. He was troubled by many guilt feelings – the murder of Shambuka, the unfairness meted out to Sita... Towards the end of the film, this mood prevails – Rama walks into the Sarayu river with the sacrificial fire, bearing everything, including his loneliness, calling out for Sita ... and disappears into the depths of the waters, carrying the sacrificial fire with him into the river is not in Ramayana – it is an interpretation. Somehow the part I liked most in the film is this end."

== Cast ==
- Ramdas as Rama
- Venkateswarlu as Lakshmana
- Chinna Pulliah as Bharata
- Sobha Kiran as Urmila
- Kesava Panicker as Valmiki
- Krishnan as Vasishta
- Pottiah as Lava
- Rangiah as Kusha
- Siva as Shambuka
- Annapurna as Shambuka's wife

== Themes and analysis ==
The Samkhya-Yoga philosophical concepts of Prakriti-Purusha bonds are used in the film. Prakriti and Purusha, as philosophical concepts, have their genealogy in the Samkhya-Yoga school of Indian philosophy. In Samkhya thought, Purusha is the Transcendental Self or Pure Consciousness. It is absolute, independent, free, imperceptible, unknowable, above any experience, and beyond any words or explanation. It remains pure, nonattributive consciousness. Purusha is neither produced nor does it produce. Unlike Advaita Vedanta and like Purva-Mimamsa, Samkhya philosophy emphasises the plurality of the Purushas. Prakriti is the first cause of the universe – of everything except the Purusha, which is uncaused, and accounts for whatever is physical, both matter and force. Through its threefold gunas or characteristics of the physical universe, Prakriti binds Purusha, the self (in the minimal sense of awareness or sentience), which itself is not distinct from Prakriti. A written commentary that throws light on Aravindan's interpretation of the play precedes his film proper. The opening scroll reads, "This film is an interpretation of the Uttara Kanda of the Ramayana. Our mythologies and the epics are constantly re-created in retellings. The epic is the basis for this visual interpretation as well. This film deviates from established norms in how it visualises the protagonists and portrays the course of events in the epic." The scroll explains that the film will try to reflect what it calls the epic's adi-sankalpam (original conception) of the theme and the protagonists. It states that "the inner essence of the film is that woman is Prakriti. Ultimately Purusha, here conceived of as the masculine self, dissolves into Prakriti. Ezhuthachan's Adhyathma Ramayana, one of the first Malayalam poems, also views Rama as Purusha and Sita as Prakriti. Aravindan stated in an interview that "C. N. [Sreekantan Nair] had made clear the prakriti-purusha notion in Ramayana". But Aravindan took the extraordinary cinematic step of representing Sita as Prakriti.

=== Significance of the title ===
The title alludes to the golden image of Sita that Rama sets by his side while he performs the Ashvamedha yaga. The yaga, a symbol of imperial power, requires that the king who performs it be accompanied by his wife. Since Rama had abandoned Sita twelve years earlier, the kulaguru (family preceptor), Vasishta, advises that he place a golden image of Sita at his side.

=== Differences between the play and Ramayana ===
Malayalam playwright C. N. Sreekantan Nair wrote his magnum opus play Kanchana Sita in 1961. He took the inspiration for this play from the Uttara Kanda (kāṇḍa: chapter) of Ramayana. Uttara Kanda is the seventh and last book of Ramayana. It concerns the final years of Rama, Sita, and Rama's brothers, and is regarded to be a later addition to Valmiki's original story. The play is the first of Sreekantan Nair's dramatic trilogy based on the Ramayana. The others are Saketham and Lankalakshmi. A reworking of Ramayana, the play is about the tragedy of power and the sacrifices demanded by adherence to dharma, including abandoning a chaste wife.

Kanchana Sita was developed by Aravindan, based on the play. The screenplay and dialogues of the film were written by Aravindan himself. The film is conceived differently from both Nair's play and the original Uttara Kanda of Ramayana. If the Uttara Kanda's critique of sovereign power is buried in the karmic webs of Rama's life, Nair's play carries a sharply materialistic edge in its critique of Kshatriya-Brahminical power. In contrast with both, Aravindan's thematic content is much more directly focused on Rama's inner conflict between moksha (the desire for enlightenment) and artha (the desire for sovereign power). Sita does not appear in the film at all, but is depicted as prakriti, or all-pervading nature, and the different moods of Sita are shown as different aspects of nature. Nair rewrote the final section of Valmiki's Ramayana as a critique of Brahminical privilege and political repression. Using Nair's play only a starting point, Aravindan transformed the script according to his interpretation of Indian philosophy and his minimalist aesthetic. He replaced Nair's crisply-articulated exchanges of dialogue with a cinematic meditation on Rama's separation from, and eventual union with Sita, thus carrying the concept of Sita as Prakriti to its visual limit.

=== Dialogues ===
The play's main feature is its very eloquent, long, and authoritative dialogues, whereas the film is almost silent. Aravindan explains: "There are some specific reasons for deciding to have sparse dialogues in Kanchana Sita. One, this episode taken from Ramayana is familiar to all. Two, Ramayana is not a supernatural reality for us, as it is ingrained in us. It is therefore not necessary to educate people about the film through lengthy dialogues. C. N. [Sreekantan Nair] had made clear the prakriti-purusha notion in Ramayana. I did not think that Sita should come in the film in the form of a woman. That is why Sita appeared in the film as prakriti and Prakriti is a character in the film. When the emotions of Sita like pain, sadness, joy, and equanimity are manifested through the moods of Prakriti, dialogue becomes redundant. I felt I could make the film without dialogue. Rama committing suicide – (I still feel it was – self immolation) had haunted me very badly. With all these, my Kanchana Sita became very different. Words were required only for very essentials. The dialogues, which I used, were from C. N. [Sreekantan Nair]'s play. The doubt I had then was whether my Rama and Lakshmana (as they were ordinary people) could use such an eloquent Sanskritised language." In another interview, he said, "Dialogues are there to carry on the storyline and make it move. But when it comes to well-known stories, dialogues ceases to be an essential ingredient." Dialogue was, however, included in Kanchana Sita at the end of the movie to discuss the responsibilities of the king.

=== Characterisation ===
The film significantly differs from all other adaptations of Ramayana in the characterisation of the central characters, including Rama and Lakshmana. The characters are humanised, contrary to the way divine characters from Indian mythology are usually depicted in visual media. Rama has a pot belly, while Lakshmana has pockmarks on his face. In an interview, Aravindan stated, "Our sculptures are large in size and exude strength and vitality, which is absent in murals. The Rama of Kanchana Sita exudes the strength and vitality of our sculptures. He is not just a plain frontal image. The wandering tribals we encounter here and there with their medicines also share this quality. I enquired and found that these people are settled in villages near the Godavari River. Apart from this they also believe that they belong to the same race. That is why I cast two of them in my film."

Similarly, Aravindan deliberately did not give a superhuman quality to Rama and Lakshmana. Only when they interact with Nature do they rise to the levels of God and go beyond the ordinary. In Aravindan's own words, "otherwise they would have been the same as anybody else." Diametrically opposed to this, Valmiki is given an appropriate form and beauty.

== Production ==
The film was produced by K. Ravindran Nair, who produced some of the most significant films that put Malayalam cinema on the world map. His productions also include memorable films of Aravindan, such as Thampu (1978), Kummatty (1979), Esthappan (1980), and Pokkuveyil (1981).

=== Casting ===
"Unfortunately a controversy arose because I had cast tribals. They have classical features and are marvellous actors. Yet I was accused of blasphemy."

— G. Aravindan's response to the controversies created due to the casting of tribals in the roles of the epic heroes.

In Kanchana Sita, the roles of the epic heroes like are played by Adivasis (tribal members) from Andhra Pradesh known as the Rama Chenchus (also known as Koyas), who claim that they are the descendants of the Ikshvaku clan, to which Rama belonged. Aravindan's idea was not to use conventional actors, but to find people who had reached the state of awareness that the role required. Rama Chenchu healers play the central roles of Rama, Lakshmana, Bharata, Lava, and Kusha. Shambukha was played by a wayside tapasvi, while a destitute woman acted in the role of his wife. The credited cast of the film includes Ramdas, Venkateswarlu, Chinna Pulliah, Kesava Panicker, Krishnan, Pottiah, Rangiah, Siva, Sobha Kiran, and Annapurna. The name of each village chief is Ramdas. The tribal who acted as Rama is also a village chief. Valmiki's character was played by poet and dramatist Kavalam Narayana Panicker's brother Kesava Panicker. Director John Abraham gave voice for this character. When asked how he got the idea to use tribals for the film, Aravindan said, "These tribals come to Trivandrum to sell herbal medicine. They are extremely intelligent. In fact, the tribals inhabiting the nine villages around the Godavari river in Andhra are supposed to have the highest I.Q. among Indian tribals. The tribe I selected is known as the Rama Chenchus. They claim to belong to the dynasty of Rama. Physically, I feel, they fit the description given by Valmiki." This experiment in casting resulted in several difficulties during production. A precise detailing had to be done because most of the actors could only react to demonstrated instructions. Communication with the actors was carried out with the help of Manmohan Dutt, painter and lecturer at the College of Fine Arts, Hyderabad. Dutt also accompanied Aravindan and his associate, journalist and filmmaker Chintha Ravi, on a preliminary trip to Andhra Pradesh to finalise the locations.

=== Filming ===
The film was shot in colour in less than three weeks during November and December 1976, entirely in Andhra Pradesh, partly on the banks of the Godavari, partly at Undavalli in Vijayawada, and in the Vicarabad forest belt in Telangana. Aravindan abandoned the typical alternation in setting of mythological films and dance dramas, including Sreekantan Nair's play, by moving Rama's story into the landscape Adivasis, imagining Ayodhya in the forest. Its places are forest caves, its streets are tracks in the wilderness, and its Sarayu river is the Godavari river winding through rural Andhra Pradesh. Aravindan identified locations 160 kilometres (99 mi) away from Rajahmundry, along the expanse of Godavari river and its ribbed red earth banks. Cinematographer-turned-director Shaji N. Karun wields the camera. Karun has been a recurring collaborator in Aravindan's films. He was assisted by popular cinematographer S. Kumar who was in his early days of career.

Filming took place at the time when the Emergency was declared in India. Police were combing the entire area around Rajamundhry in their hunt for the Maoist People's War Group. Members of the production team were interrogated by the police several times because they looked different from the natives.

The film was completed using simple devices such as table fans to rustle the leaves. A few unexpected things happened for the good while shooting the climax scene. For instance, a rare and unexpected early morning mist on the banks of Godavari made the whole scene ethereal.

== Reception ==
The film received mixed reviews from critics, but is widely regarded as a landmark film in Indian cinema history. It is credited with the formation of a new trend towards independent filmmaking in South India. The Hindu described Kanchana Sita as one of the most poetic films in Malayalam. Scholar V. Rajakrishnan noted that Aravindan had not fully considered the implications of locating Rama's story in an Adivasi community. Rajakrishnan pointed out that the rigid economy of expression and the subdued acting styles, which appear to render all dialogue artificial, reduce the element of human drama that is so prominent in Sreekantan Nair's play. Poet and scholar Ayyappa Panicker views Sita's absence as typical of Aravindan's style, in which there is a conscious, meticulous effort "not to communicate in order to communicate". Panicker described Aravindan's expressive style using his own concept of antarasannivesa, or the poetics of interiorisation. "Sita is not a woman, or an individual, but an eternal concept in the film", Panicker said in an interview. The Hindu critic Sashi Kumar stated, "In the film, Aravindan synthesises into a consummate whole his marginality principle and his anthropomorphic contemplation of nature." Vidyarthy Chatterjee of The Economic Times said, "Visually stunning in many passages and using sound in such a manner as to make for heightened aesthetic pleasure, Kanchana Sita is a milestone that has unfortunately been bypassed by many who would have done better to focus on its innovative elements". Yves Thoraval said, "Kanchana Sita is a visually dazzling film illustrating this long mythological episode potentially rich in dialogue but of which G. Aravindan has chosen to make a non-realist, virtually silent and contemplative film by calling up a tribal population to portray the mythological characters".

The National Film Award for Best Direction was given to Aravindan for "the film's courageous and uncompromising exploration of an ancient epic theme through a pronouncedly new cinematic language, for making the camera speak more eloquently than the introspective characters of the Ramayana, for projecting against the vast backdrop of nature, for matching profound philosophical ideas with astonishing evocations of the beauties of the physical world".
