= Kanchana Sita (play) =

Kanchana Sita is a 1961 play by Malayalam playwright C. N. Sreekantan Nair. The author took inspiration for this play from the Uttara Kanda of Valmiki's Ramayana. The play is the first of Sreekantan Nair's dramatic trilogy based on the Ramayana, the other two are Saketham and Lankalakshmi.

Kanchana Sita won the Kendra Sahitya Academy Award for the year 1962.

In 1977, G. Aravindan adapted the play into a film with same title. The film went on to become a great critical success and is regarded one of the best Indian films ever made.
