= C. N. Sreekantan Nair =

Indian independence activist and writer

C.N.Sreekantan Nair
- Born: 31 March 1928; Thiruvananthapuram, Kerala, India
- Died: 17 December 1976 (aged 48); Ernakulam, Kerala, India
- Resting place: Chavara, Kollam district, Kerala
- Occupations: Writer, playwright, screenwriter, Journalist
- Notable work: Kanchana Sita; Lankalakshmi; Saketham; Nashtakkachavadam
- Spouse: Kanakangi Amma
- Children: C.N.Unnikrishnan, Ambika Kumar
- Parent(s): Madavoor S.Neelakanta PIllai, Madhavikutty Amma
- Awards: Kerala Sahitya Akademi Award for Drama, M. P. Paul Prize

C. N. Sreekantan Nair (1928–1976) was an Indian independence activist, a Malayalam writer, short story writer, playwright and screenwriter, best known for his Ramayana trilogy – Kanchana Sita, Saketham and Lankalakshmi. He wrote 10 plays, 4 short story anthologies, book of non-fiction and collected works. Kerala Sahitya Akademi awarded him their annual award for drama in 1962. He was also a recipient of the M. P. Paul Prize.

== Biography ==
C. N. Sreekantan Nair was born on 31 March 1928 at Thiruvananthapuram in the south Indian state of Kerala to Madavoor S.Neelakanta Pillai and Madhavikutty Amma. After schooling at local schools, he did his college education at Thiruvananthapuram during which time he was involved in student politics and served as the secretary of Akhila Thiruvithamcoor Vidyarthi Congress and as the vice president of the Akhilendhya Vidyarthi Congress. He participated in the Vidyarthi Congress of 1947 which was banned by C. P. Ramaswami Iyer, the then Diwan of Travancore, and he had to go into hiding. After the Indian independence, he completed his graduate studies and joined Prabhodham daily run by A. P. Udhayabhanu. Later, he worked in a number of publications, such as Navabharatham, Kaumudi, Tharapadham, Kathamalika and Deshabhandhu. He also worked as the district information officer of Department of Information and Public Relations, a job he quit, following a difference with R. Sankar, the then chief minister of Kerala.

Sreekantan Nair was married to Kanakangi Amma and the couple has two children.Towards the later part of his life, he turned spiritual and was involved in the running of a press, Sreemudralayam, in Kottayam which was later shifted to Ernakulam. He died on 17 December 1976, at the age of 48.

== Legacy and honours ==
Sreekanatan Nair, whose body of work comprises 10 plays, 4 short story anthologies and a book of non-fiction, is best known for his Ramayana-based trilogy, Saketham, Lankalakshmi and Kanchana Sita. Ayyappa Panicker, a noted poet and scholar, observed that Lankalakshmi brought out the playwright in Sreekantan Nair, while Saketham and Kanchana Sita highlighted the poet and the philosopher in the playwright. His first major play was Nashtakachavadam, which was a short story in the beginning but was later rewritten as a play in 1957 and Kali a play he wrote in 1967 is known as the first surrealist play in Malayalam literature. Nair, who experimented with stage direction and concepts of theatre, co-founded Nataka Kalari, a Kollam-based forum for the promotion and practice of theatre; several known writers and artists such as M. Govindan, Ayyappa Panikkar, G. Aravindan, Kainikkara Kumara Pillai and G. Sankara Pillai were involved with the movement. "Thanathunatakavedi", the idea of having a theatre involving indigenous art forms of Kerala was first evolved from C.N. He published an article "Thanathunatakavedi" in 1967 detailing his thoughts. He was the organiser of the 5th All India Writers Conference at Eloor, Kerala and The World Parliament of Religions in 1968 at Sasthamkotta, Kerala.

Sreekantan Nair's involvement with Malayalam cinema started with the 1966 film, Archana, directed by K. S. Sethumadhavan, and he wrote the story, screenplay and dialogues for the film. His next venture was for Kamuki, an Adoor Gopalakrishnan film, which was based on Nair's story but the film never released. Theerangal, a film by Rajeevnath in 1978 was based on his story and he wrote the dialogues for the movie and collaborated with the director on the screenplay. His play, Kanchana Sita was adapted into a film with same name by G. Aravindan and the film fetched the National Film Award for Best Direction for its director.

Sreekantan Nair received the Kerala Sahitya Akademi Award for Drama in 1962 for the play, Kanchana Sita. He was also a recipient of the M. P. Paul Prize, his play, Nashtakachavadam, fetching him the award.

== Works ==
=== Plays ===
- Saketham
- Lankalakshmi
- Kanchana Sita
- Nadakathrayam
- Aa kani thinnaruthu
- Aettile Pasu
- Kali
- Sneham Bhakti
- Nashtakachavadam
- Madhuvidhu
- Manyathayude mara

=== Short stories ===
- Thilakkunna mannu
- Pichipoo
- Puliyilakkara neryathu
- Sindoora pottu

=== Essay ===
- Randilayum oru thiriyum

== Bibliography ==
- Sreekantan Nair, C. N. (2008). C N Sreekantan nayarute krithikal sampoornam. Kottayam: D.C. Books. ISBN 9788126418404.
- Sreekantan Nair (1982). Kazhinjakala chithrangal. Kottayam: National Book Stall.
- Sreekantan Nair, C. N. (2002). Naataka thrayam (2nd. ed.). Kottayam: D.C. Books. ISBN 9788126403929.
- C. N. Sreekantan Nair (2013). In the Shade of the Sahyadri. Oxford University Press. ISBN 9780198092179.
- Sreekantan Nair C N (1961). Kanchanaseetha. Kottayam: DC Books. ISBN 9788126411948.
- Sreekantan Nair C N (1974). Lankalakshmi. Kottayam: DC Books. ISBN 9788126411214.
- Nair, C. N. Sreekandan (12 March 2005). Kali. Current Books Thrissur.
- Sreekantan Nair C N. Saketham.
- Nashtakkachavadam
- Aa Kani Thinnaruth
- Aettile Pashu
- Madhuvidhu
- Sindoorappottu
- Thilakkunna Ponnu
- Pichippoo
- Puliyilakkara Neryath

== See also ==
- List of Malayalam-language authors by category
- List of Malayalam-language authors
