= Jayadevan Chakkadath =

Indian film sound recordist and designer

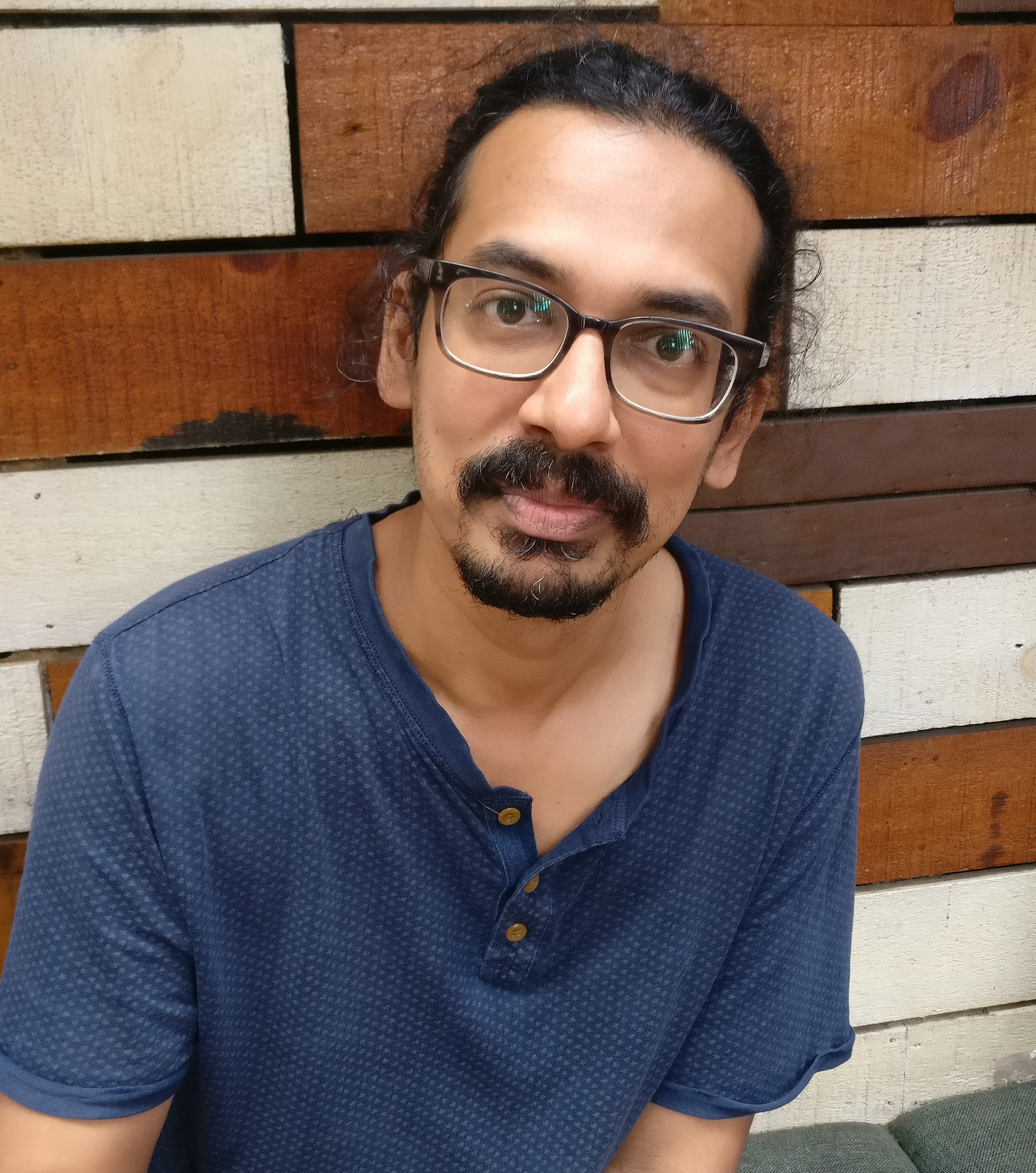
- Born: 13 January 1981 (age 45); Eravu, Thrissur, Kerala, India
- Education: Satyajit Ray Film and Television Institute
- Occupations: Sound editor; sound designer; sound recordist
- Years active: 2007–present
- Spouse: Garima Jayadevan
- Children: 1
- Parents: K. Aravindakshan; Vijayalakshmi

Jayadevan Chakkadath (born 13 January 1981) is an Indian sound editor and recordist known for his works in Malayalam cinema. He has won National Film Award for Best Audiography in 2017 and four Kerala State Film Awards. He received a post-graduate diploma in sound recording and engineering from Satyajit Ray Film and Television Institute Kolkata in 2007. He was a faculty member at Srishti School of Arts, Design and Technology in Bangalore from 2015 to 2017, training given for location sound recording, sound design and audio narratives at under graduate level. He is an alumnus of Cochin University of Science and Technology in Mechanical Engineering (1998-2002).

== Filmography ==
Year	Title	Language	Credit	Ref.
2009	Tera Kya Hoga Johnny	Hindi	Foley effects editor	
2009	8 x 10 Tasveer	Hindi	Foley effects editor	
2010	Veettilekkulla Vazhi	Malayalam	sync sound & dialogue editor	
2011	Inkaar	Hindi	sync sound recordist	
2012	Olipporu	Malayalam	sound designer	
2013	Goliyon Ki Raasleela Ram-Leela	Hindi	sync sound & designer	
2013	Perariyathavar	Malayalam	sync sound & designer	
2014	Valiya Chirakulla Pakshikal	Malayalam	sync sound & designer	
2014	Daas Dev	Hindi	sync sound recordist	
2014	Fitoor	Hindi	sync sound recordist	
2015	Kaadu Pookkunna Neram	Malayalam	sync sound & designer	
2016	Sound of Silence	Malayalam	Sound designer	
2017	Mayaanadhi	Malayalam	Sound designer	
2017	Hey Jude	Malayalam	Sound designer	
2018	Carbon	Malayalam	Sound designer	
2018	Oru Kuttanadan Blog	Malayalam	Sound designer	
2019	Kumbalangi Nights	Malayalam	Sound designer	
2025	Diés Iraé	Malayalam	Sound designer	
2026	Bouma	Malayalam	Sound designer	

== Awards ==
National Film Awards

Year	Category	Film	Ref(s)
2016	Best Sound Design	Kaadu Pookkunna Neram	

Kerala State Film Awards

Year	Category	Film	Ref(s)
2016	Best Sound Recordist	Kaadu Pookkunna Neram	
2016	Best Sound Design	Kaadu Pookkunna Neram	
2018	Best Sound Design	Carbon	
2023	Best Sound Design	Ullozhukku^{(shared with Anil Radhakrishnan)}	
