= Pramod Thomas =

Audio engineer and sound designer

Pramod J. Thomas
- Born: Pandalam, Kerala, India
- Education: Film and Television Institute of India, Pune
- Occupations: Audio engineer, Sound designer
- Years active: 1995–present
- Awards: See below

Pramod J. Thomas is an Indian audio engineer and sound designer from Pandalam, Kerala. A graduate of the Film and Television Institute of India, Pune, he has worked across Hindi, Malayalam, Tamil and Marathi cinema since the late 1990s. He is known for his work on films including Rituparno Ghosh's Raincoat (2004), Anurag Kashyap's Dev.D (2009), and Shankar's Enthiran (2010).

He has received national and state-level recognition for his work in sound, including the National Film Award for Best Sound Design for Gandha (2008) and the Kerala State Film Award for Best Sound Mixing for Kaadu Pookkunna Neram (2016) and Aedan (2017).

== Career ==
After completing his training at the Film and Television Institute of India, Pune, Thomas began working in sound in Indian cinema in the late 1990s. His early work involved production sound and post-production roles across multiple language industries, including Malayalam, Hindi and Tamil cinema.

By the mid-2000s, he was contributing to feature films in both mainstream and independent cinema, including Rituparno Ghosh's Raincoat (2004). He later worked on films such as Dev.D (2009) and Enthiran (2010). In Malayalam cinema, his work has included films such as Veettilekkulla Vazhi (2011), Kaadu Pookkunna Neram (2016), Rakshadhikari Baiju Oppu (2017) and Eeda (2018), where he was involved in sound mixing and sound design.

Alongside feature films, Thomas has continued to work on independent projects and short films, and remains active in Indian cinema in various sound-related roles.

== Filmography ==
Year	Film	Language	Credit
2022	Ela Veezha Poonchira	Malayalam	sound mixer
2022	Thuramukham	Malayalam	sound mixer
2022	Pada	Malayalam	sound mixer
2021	Nayattu	Malayalam	re-recording mixer
2021	PAKA (River of Blood)	Malayalam	sound mixer
2019	Thottappan	Malayalam	sound designer
2019	Katil Oru Paykappal	Malayalam	sound designer
2018	Painting Life	Malayalam	sound mixer
2018	The Gandhi Murder	British-Indian	sound recordist
2018	Aedan	Malayalam	re-recording mixer
2018	Eeda	Malayalam	sound desigener
2017	Sound of Silence	Malayalam	final mixing engineer
2017	Ayaal Sassi	Malayalam	sound mixer
2017	Rakshadhikari Baiju Oppu	Malayalam	sound mixer
2016	Kismath	Malayalam	sound mixer
2016	The Land's Music	Malayalam	sound mixer
2015	Valiya Chirakulla Pakshikal	Malayalam	sound mixer
2014	Happy Journey	Marathi	re-recording mixer
2014	Perariyathavar	Malayalam	sound mixer
2014	Ek Hazarachi Note	Hindi	production sound mixer
2013	Astu	Marathi	sound mixer
2013	Rajdhani Express	Hindi	re-recording mixer
2012	Bijuka	Hindi	mixing engineer
2012	Pune tc	Hindi	sound mixer
2012	Akasathinte Niram	Malayalam	sound mixer
2012	Jaane Kya Tune Kahi (Short)	Hindi	sound mixer
2011	Veettilekkulla Vazhi	Malayalam	sound mixer
2011	Gajaar: Journey of the Soul	Hindi	re-recording mixer
2010	Enthiran	Tamil	sound mixer
2010	Soch Lo	Hindi	sound mixer
2010	Striker	Hindi	re-recording engineer
2009	Aadmi Ki Aurat Aur Anya Kahaniya	Hindi	re-recording mixer
2009	Dev.D	Hindi	mixing engineer
2007	Gauri: The Unborn	Hindi	sound mixer
2007	1971	Hindi	sound mixer
2007	Traffic Signal	Hindi	surround mixing
2005	Bluffmaster!	Hindi	surround mixing
2004	Raincoat	Hindi	sound team member

== Accolades ==
Year	Award	Category	Work	Ref(s)
2008	National Film Awards	Best Sound Design (shared with Anmol Bhave)	Gandha	
2016	Kerala State Film Awards	Best Sound Mixing	Kaadu Pookkunna Neram	
2017	Kerala State Film Awards	Best Sound Mixing	Aedan	
