= Kerala State Film Award for Best Cinematography =

Annual Indian film award

The Kerala State Film Award for Best Cinematographer is presented annually at the Kerala State Film Awards of India.

The recipients of the award have been:

Year	Cinematographer	Film	Director
1969	Ashok Kumar	Janmabhoomi	John Sankaramangalam
1970	Mankada Ravi Varma	Olavum Theeravum	P. N. Menon
1971	Melli Irani		
1972	Mankada Ravi Varma (black & white) - E. N. Balakrishnan (colour)	Swayamvaram - Pulliman	Adoor Gopalakrishnan -
1973	Ashok Kumar	Swapnam	Babu Nanthankode
1974	Mankada Ravi Varma (black & white) - Balu Mahendra (colour)	Uttarayanam - Nellu	G. Aravindan - Ramu Kariat
1975	Balu Mahendra (black & white) - Masthan (colour)	Chuvanna Sandyakal, Prayanam - Swami Ayyappan	K. S. Sethumadhavan, Bharathan - P. Subramaniam
1976	Vipin Das (black & white) - Ramachandra Babu (colour)	Aalinganam, Manimuzhakkam, Choondakkari - Dweepu	I. V. Sasi, P. A. Backer, P.Vijayan - Ramu Kariat
1977	Ashok Kumar (black & white) - Shaji N. Karun (colour)	Taxi Driver - Kanchana Sita	P. N. Menon - Aravindan
1978	Madhu Ambat (black & white) - Ramachandra Babu (colour)	Aswadhama, Sooryente Maranam, Yaaro Oraal - Rathinirvedam	K. R. Mohanan, Rajeevnath, V.K.Pavithran - Bharathan
1979	Hemachandran (Black &White) - Shaji N. Karun (colour)	Thrasam - Esthappan	Padiyan - Aravindan
1980	Sivan, Mahesh (black & white) - Ramachandra Babu (colour)	Yagam - Chamaram	Sivan - Bharathan
1981	Vipin Mohan (black & white) - Mankada Ravi Varma (colour)	Aparna - Elippathayam	Padmakumar - Adoor Gopalakrishnan
1982	Vasanth Kumar (colour)	Ormakkayi	Bharathan
1983	Mankada Ravi Varma (colour)	Nokkukuthi	Mankada Ravi Varma
1984	Mankada Ravi Varma (black & white) - Jayanan Vincent (colour)	Mukhamukham - Adiyozhukkukal	Adoor Gopalakrishnan - I. V. Sasi
1985	Venu	Irakal	K. G. George
1986	Shaji N. Karun	Onnu Muthal Poojyam Vare	Raghunath Paleri
1987	Madhu Ambat	Purushartham, Swathi Thirunal	K. R. Mohanan, Lenin Rajendran
1988	Sunny Joseph	Piravi	Shaji N. Karun
1989	Ramachandra Babu	Oru Vadakkan Veeragatha	Hariharan
1990	Madhu Ambat	Amaram	Bharathan
1991	S. Kumar	Kilukkam	Priyadarsan
1992	Santosh Sivan; Venu	Aham	T. Rajeevnath
1993	P. Sukumar	Sopanam	Jayaraj
1994	Hari Nair	Swaham	Shaji N. Karun
1995	Santosh Sivan	Kaalapani	Priyadarsan
1996	M. J. Radhakrishnan	Deshadanam	Jayaraj
1997	Hari Nair	Ennu Swantham Janakikutty	Hariharan
1998	Alagappan N.	Agnisakshi	Shyamaprasad
1999	M. J. Radhakrishnan	Karunam	Jayaraj
2000	Sunny Joseph	Swayamvarapandal	Harikumar
2001	K. G. Jayan	Dany	T. V. Chandran
2002	Mankada Ravi Varma; Sunny Joseph	Nizhalkuthu	Adoor Gopalakrishnan
2003	Venu	Margam	Rajeev Vijayaraghavan
2004	S. Kumar	Akale	Shyamaprasad
2005	Santosh Sivan	Anandabhadram	Santosh Sivan
2006	Manoj Pillai	Kaiyoppu	Ranjith
2007	M. J. Radhakrishnan	Ottakkayyan; Adayalangal	G R Indugopan; M. G.Sasi
2008	M. J. Radhakrishnan	Bioscope	K. M. Madhusudhanan
2009	K. G. Jayan	Sufi Paranja Katha	Priyanandanan
2010	M. J. Radhakrishnan; Shehnad Jalal	Veettilekkulla Vazhi; Chithrasoothram	Dr. Biju; Vipin Vijay
2011	M. J. Radhakrishnan	Akasathinte Niram	Dr. Biju
2012	Madhu Neelakandan	Annayum Rasoolum	Rajeev Ravi
2013	Sujith Vaassudev	Ayaal; Memories	Suresh Unnithan; Jeethu Joseph
2014	Amal Neerad	Iyobinte Pusthakam	Amal Neerad
2015	Jomon T. John	Charlie; Ennu Ninte Moideen; Nee-Na	Martin Prakkat; R. S. Vimal; Lal Jose
2016	M. J. Radhakrishnan	Kaadu Pookkunna Neram	Dr.Biju
2017	Manesh Madhavan	Aedan	Sanju Surendran
2018	K. U. Mohanan	Carbon	Venu
2019	Pratap P. Nair	Kenchira, Idam	Manoj Kana
2020	Chandru Selvaraj	Kayattam	Sanal Kumar Sasidharan
2021	Madhu Neelakandan	Churuli	Lijo Jose Pellissery
2022	Chandru Selvaraj	Vazhakku	Sanal Kumar Sasidharan
2022	Manesh Madhavan	Ela Veezha Poonchira	Shahi Kabir
2023	Sunil K. S.	The Goat Life	Blessy
2024	Shyju Khalid	Manjummel Boys	Chidambaram S. Poduval
