= M. J. Radhakrishnan =

Indian cinematographer (died 2019)

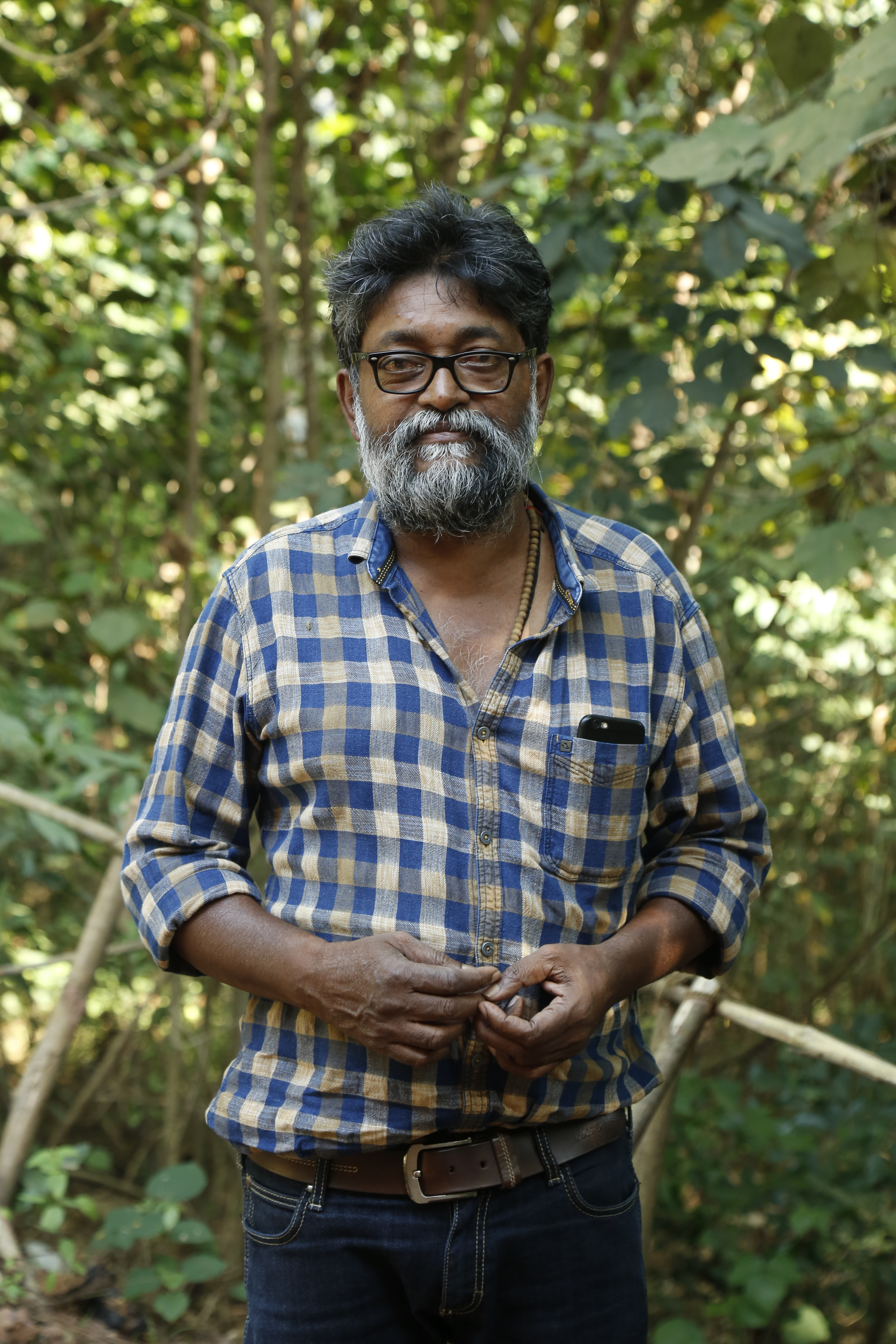
- Born: M. J. Radhakrishnan; Punalur, Kollam
- Died: 12 July 2019; Thiruvananthapuram, India
- Other name: MJR
- Occupation: Cinematographer
- Years active: 1988–2019

M. J. Radhakrishnan (1957/1958 – 12 July 2019) was an Indian cinematographer working mainly in Malayalam films. He got National film award 2018 as best cinematographer for his work on Malayalam movie Oolu. He won Kerala State Award for Best Cinematography 7 times (the most), equal with Mankada Ravi Varma. Earlier he worked as a still photographer and then as an associate to cinematographer turned director Shaji N. Karun. His important works included Deshadanam (1996), Karunam (1999) Naalu Pennungal (2007), Veettilekkulla Vazhi (2010) and Akasathinte Niram (Color of Sky; 2012). His films were screened at several prominent film festivals around the world including Cannes, Shanghai, Cairo, Montreal, Telluride, Jeonju, Toronto, Chicago, Rhode Island and Rotterdam. One of his works, Marana Simhasanam (English: "Throne of Death", French: "Le Trone de la mort", 1999), won Caméra d'Or (Golden Camera Award) in the Un Certain Regard section at the 1999 Cannes Film Festival. Another film Veyilmarangal (Trees under the sun) won Golden Goblet award for Outstanding Artistic achievement at Shanghai International Film Festival 2019. He worked on over 117 feature films and several documentaries and worked with some of the prominent Indian filmmakers including Adoor Gopalakrishnan, Murali Nair, Shaji N. Karun, TV Chandran, Dr. Biju, Jayaraj and Renjith. He mostly worked on arthouse films and was known for his natural lighting styles. In a career spanning more than two decades, he worked with a number of young film makers, mostly in their maiden ventures. Film Kalamandalam Hyderali 2019, directed by Kiran G. Nath was his last completed work as director of photography.

== Early life ==
M. J. Radhakrishnan was born in Tholicode, Punalur located in Kollam district, Kerala. MJR was very passionate about photography in his teenage days.

== Career ==
M. J. Radhakrishnan began his career as a still photographer. He worked as a still photographer on some films for which Shaji N Karun was the cinematographer. Then he started working as an associate cinematographer under Shaji N Karun, who was a major influence in his life. His first independent work as a cinematographer was Maamalakalkkapurathu (1988), directed by Ali Akbar. Film Kalamandalam Hyderali 2019, directed by Kiran G. Nath was his last completed work as director of photography.

== Selected filmography ==
- 1988 Mamalakalkkappurathu
- 1996 Oru Neenda Yathra
- 1996 Desadanam
- 1997 Kaliyattam
- 1997 Raajathanthram
- 1999 Marana Simhasanam
- 1999 Karunam
- 2001 Pattiyude Divasam
- 2001 Theerthadanam
- 2002 Kannaki
- 2003 Parinamam
- 2003 Ek Alag Mausam
- 2003 Sthithi
- 2004 The Journey
- 2004 Koottu
- 2005 Makalkku
- 2006 Pulijanmam
- 2007 Thakarachenda
- 2007 Naalu Pennungal
- 2007 Ottakkayyan
- 2008 Gulmohar
- 2008 Atayalangal
- 2008 Oru Pennum Randaanum
- 2008 Thirakkatha
- 2008 Vilapangalkkappuram
- 2009 Samayam
- 2009 Dr. Patient
- 2009 Orkkuka Vallappozhum
- 2009 Kerala Cafe (segment "Happy Journey")
- 2009 Madhyavenal
- 2010 Nirakazhcha
- 2010 Punyam Aham
- 2010 Veettilekkulla Vazhi
- 2011 Orma Mathram
- 2011 Sengadal
- 2011 Akasathinte Niram
- 2013 Papilio Buddha
- 2014 Perariyathavar
- 2015 Birds With Large Wings
- 2015 Ottaal
- 2016 Pinneyum
- 2016 Kaadu Pookkunna Neram
- 2016 Shaanu
- 2017 Painting Life
- 2017 Viswasapoorvam Mansoor
- 2018 Oolu
- 2018 A for Apple
- 2018 Appuvinte Sathyanweshanam
- 2019 Netaji
- 2019 Veyilmarangal (Trees under the sun)
- 2019 Makudi
- 2019 Kalamandalam Hyderali
- 2019 Ashtamudi Couples
- 2019 A for Apple

== Awards ==
=== Kerala State Film Awards ===
- 1996: Kerala State Film Award for Best Photography - Deshadanam
- 1999: Kerala State Film Award for Best Photography - Karunam
- 2007: Kerala State Film Award for Best Photography - Adayalangal, Ottakkayyan
- 2008: Kerala State Film Award for Best Photography - Bioscope
- 2010: Kerala State Film Award for Best Photography - Veettilekkulla Vazhi
- 2011: Kerala State Film Award for Best Photography - Akasathinte Niram
- 2016: Kerala State Film Award for Best Photography - Kaadu Pookkunna Neram

=== National Film Awards ===
- 2018: National Film Award for Best Cinematography - Olu

=== Kerala State Television Awards ===
- 2014 : Best Cinematographer - Thamaranoolu

=== International awards ===
- 2008:South Asian International Film Festival-Best Cinematographer - Bioscope
- 2011:Zanzibar International Film Festival-SIGNIS Award for Cinematography - Veettilekkulla Vazhi
- 2013:Oaxaca FilmFest-Global Feature Section- Outstanding achievement in Cinematography/Mención honorífica mejor fotografía - Papilio Buddha
- 2015:Kazan International Film Festival, Russia -Best Cinematographer - Perariyathavar
- 2016:Indian International film festival Queensland, Australia -Best Cinematographer - Valiya Chirakulla Pakshikal
- 2017:Indian International film festival Queensland, Australia -Best Cinematographer - Sound of Silence (2017 film)
- 2017: Cincinnati Indian International film festival, Ohio, USA -Best Cinematographer - Painting Life 2019

=== Personal life ===
He is survived by his wife, Sreelatha; son, Yadukrishnan; and daughter, Neeraja. His son, Yadukrishnan, made his debut as a cinematographer with the film Papa Buka, directed by Dr. Biju.
