= Sinoy Joseph =

Indian re-recordist and sound designer (b. 1981)

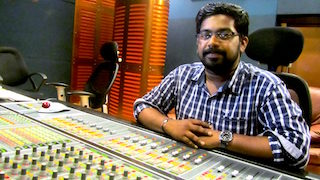
- Born: 31 July 1981 (age 44); Kottayam, Kerala, India
- Occupation: Sound engineer
- Years active: 2004–present
- Spouse: Asha Sinoy
- Children: Seraffin, Gabriellah

Sinoy Joseph (born 31 July) is an Indian film sound mixer and sound designer. He won the 60th National Film Awards for the best Re-recordist of the Final Mixed Track for the film Gangs of Wasseypur. Again he won the 69th National Film Awards for the best Re-recordist of the Final Mixed Track for the film Sardar Udham. He also won the best sound mixing at the 49th Kerala State Film Awards for the film Carbon. He has worked on more than 600 feature films in almost 25 languages, which includes English, Hindi, Malayalam, Tamil and Marathi cinema.

== Early life ==
Sinoy Joseph was born in Kudavechoor near Vaikom in Kottayam, Kerala. He was the youngest of four children. His father worked as a school teacher at St. Michael's HSS, Kudavechoor. Sinoy did his schooling in the same school. Apart from his studies, Sinoy was active in other extra-curricular activities which included painting, singing and, dancing. He is a trained Classical Dancer and Singer. He was conferred with the Kalaprathibha in the Kerala sub-district and District Youth Festival for Four years. He went to St. Xavier's College, Vaikom, to pursue his pre-degree. He earned a bachelor's degree in Electronics and Computer Hardware from School of Technology and Applied Science, Mahatma Gandhi University, Kerala. He then earned a certification in Audio Engineering from Chetana Sound Studios, Thrissur, Kerala.

== Career ==
After his Sound Engineering in Chetana Institute, Sinoy moved to Mumbai in 2005. He started his career as a recordist in Quality Cine Labs, Mumbai. After a few months of working he got an opportunity to work as assistant re-recording mixer under Pramod Thomas and Deepan Chatterjee. He became an independent re-recording sound mixer in the year of 2008. Within three years, he became widely recognized in Bollywood as a sound re-recordist in the Indian film industry. He won the 60th National Film Awards for the best re-recordist of the final mixed track for the film Gangs of Wasseypur in 2012. Again he won the 69th National Film Awards for the best re-recordist of the final mixed track for the film Sardar Udham in 2021. He has worked on more than 600 feature films in almost 25 languages in a span of 22 years of his career till date. His major works include English Vinglish, Piku, Pink, Nanban, Lai Bhaari, Rajkahini, Masaan, Sairat, Trapped, Carbon, October, and Dhadak 2.

== Awards and recognition ==
– 60th National Film Awards: Best Re-recordist of the Final Mixed Track for Gangs of Wasseypur - Part 2 (2013).

– 69th National Film Awards: Best Re-recordist of the Final Mixed Track for Sardar Udham (2021).

== Personal life ==
He is married to Asha Sinoy. They have two daughters, Seraffin and Gabriellah.

== Filmography ==
| Year | Film | Language | Note | Credit |
|---|---|---|---|---|
| 2022 | Ghode Ko Jalebi Khilane Le Ja Riya Hoon | Hindi | | Re-recording Mixer |
| 2022 | Rorschach (film) | Malayalam | | Re-recording Mixer |
| 2022 | Kooman (film) | Malayalam | | Sound Designer and Re-recording Mixer |
| 2020 | A: Ad Infinitum | Telugu | | Re-recording Mixer |
| 2019 | Android Kunjappan V 5.25 | Malayalam | | Re-recording Mixer |
| 2019 | Luca | Malayalam | | Re-recording Mixer |
| 2018 | Njan Prakashan | Malayalam | | Re-recording Mixer |
| 2018 | Joseph | Malayalam | | Re-recording Mixer |
| 2018 | Who | Malayalam, English | | Dolby Atmos Mixer |
| 2018 | Neerali | Malayalam | | Re-recording Mixer |
| 2018 | October | Hindi | | Re-recording Mixer |
| 2018 | Carbon | Malayalam | | Re-recording Mixer |
| 2016 | Pink | Hindi | | Re-recording Mixer |
| 2016 | Trapped | Hindi | | Re-recording Mixer |
| 2016 | Sairat | Marathi | | Re-recording Mixer |
| 2015 | Piku | Hindi | | Re-recording Mixer |
| 2013 | Filmistaan | Hindi | | Re-recording Mixer |
| 2013 | Rela Re | Marathi | | Re-recording Mixer |
| 2012 | Gangs of Wasseypur | Hindi | | Re-recording Mixer |
| 2012 | English Vinglish | Hindi | | Re-recording Mixer |
| 2012 | Adaminte Makan Abu | Malayalam | | Re-recording Mixer |
| 2012 | Nanban | Tamil | | Re-recording Mixer |
| 2012 | Chittagong | Hindi | | Re-recording Mixer |
| 2012 | Pandoru Kaalath | Malayalam | Short Film | Re-recording Mixer |
| 2012 | Tarkash | Hindi | | Re-recording Mixer |
| 2012 | Resident Evil | English | | Version Re-recording Mixer |
| 2012 | Brave | English | | Version Re-recording Mixer |
| 2012 | The Good Road | Gujarati | | Re-recording Mixer |
| 2012 | Luv Shuv Tey Chicken Khurana | Hindi | | Associate Re-recording Mixer |
| 2012 | Satya, Savitri Aani Satyavan | Marathi | | Re-recording Mixer |
| 2012 | 4 Idiots | Marathi | | Re-recording Mixer |
| 2012 | The Amazing Spider-Man | English | | Version Re-recording Mixer |
| 2012 | Mujhe Jeene Do | Hindi | | Re-recording Mixer |
| 2012 | Kuch Teri Kuch Meri | Hindi | | Re-recording Mixer |
| 2012 | John Carter | English | | Version Re-recording Mixer |
| 2012 | Valentine's Night | Hindi | | Associate Re-recording Mixer |
| 2012 | Golaberji | Marathi | | Re-recording Mixer |
| 2012 | Love at First Sight | English | Short Film | Re-recording Mixer |
| 2012 | Last Message | Hindi | Short Film | Re-recording Mixer |
| 2012 | Shree | Hindi | | Re-recording Mixer |
| 2012 | Ramat Ravan | Marathi | | Re-recording Mixer |
| 2012 | Nomad | English | | Re-recording Mixer |
| 2011 | Eashwari | Marathi | | Re-recording Mixer |
| 2011 | Underworld: Endless War | English | | Version Re-recording Mixer |
| 2011 | Found Footage | Hindi | | Re-recording Mixer |
| 2011 | Immortals | English | | Version Re-recording Mixer |
| 2011 | Ra.One | Hindi | | Version Re-recording Mixer |
| 2011 | Breakaway / Speedy Singhs | English | | Re-recording Mixer |
| 2011 | Mad | Hindi | | Re-recording Mixer |
| 2011 | Tekken | Japanese | | Version Re-recording Mixer |
| 2011 | Ekka Ekka | Punjabi | | Re-recording Mixer |
| 2011 | The Smurfs | English | | Version Re-recording Mixer |
| 2011 | Case No.913 | Hindi | Short Film | Re-recording Mixer |
| 2011 | And Gandhi Goes Missing | Hindi/Marathi | Short Film | Re-recording Mixer |
| 2011 | Professor Shonku | Bengali | | Re-recording Mixer |
| 2011 | Kalarippayattu | Malayalam | Documentary film | Re-recording Mixer |
| 2011 | Jaa Bhai Ja | Hindi | | Re-recording Mixer |
| 2011 | Rangmanch | Marathi | | Re-recording Mixer |
| 2011 | Will You Marry Me? | Hindi | | Re-recording Mixer |
| 2011 | Gypsi | Hindi | Short film | Re-recording Mixer |
| 2011 | I Am | Hindi | | Associate Re-recording Mixer |
| 2011 | Splice | English | | Version Re-recording Mixer |
| 2011 | Shin-chan | English | | Version Re-recording Mixer |
| 2011 | Pirates of the Caribbean | English | | Version Re-recording Mixer |
| 2011 | The Green Chic | English | | Associate Re-recording Mixer |
| 2011 | Haqeeqat | Hindi | | Re-recording Mixer |
| 2011 | Satrangee Parachute | Hindi | | Re-recording Mixer |
| 2011 | Chandrapurchi Devi Mahakali | Marathi | | Associate Re-recording Mixer |
| 2011 | Battle: Los Angeles | English | | Version Re-recording Mixer |
| 2011 | Raada Rox | Marathi | | Re-recording Mixer |
| 2011 | The Green Hornet | English | | Version Re-recording Mixer |
| 2010 | The Tourist | English | | Version Re-recording Mixer |
| 2010 | Ra Pu Jo | Hindi | | Associate Re-recording Mixer |
| 2010 | Pyar Ka Funda | Hindi | | Associate Re-recording Mixer |
| 2010 | The Warrior's Way | English | | Version Re-recording Mixer |
| 2010 | Faster | Hindi | | Re-recording Mixer |
| 2010 | Turang Des | Hindi | | Associate Re-recording Mixer |
| 2010 | Bhoot and Friends | Hindi | | Re-recording Mixer |
| 2010 | Andardah | Hindi | | Re-recording Mixer |
| 2010 | Chutki BajaKe | Hindi | | Re-recording Mixer |
| 2010 | Ankur Loves Sidhant | Hindi | | Re-recording Mixer |
| 2010 | The Sorcerer's Apprentice | English | | Version Re-recording Mixer |
| 2010 | Khuda Khushi | Hindi | | Re-recording Mixer |
| 2010 | Kabaddi | Punjabi | | Re-recording Mixer |
| 2010 | Do Dooni Chaar | Hindi | | Assistant Re-recording Mixer |
| 2010 | Ajab Lagnachi Gajab Gosht | Marathi | | Re-recording Mixer |
| 2005 | Dombivali Fast | Marathi | | Assistant Sound Mixer |
