= National Film Award for Best Sound Design =

Indian film award

- National award for contributions to Indian Cinema
- Sponsored by: National Film Development Corporation of India
- Formerly called: Best Sound Recording (1976–1979); Best Audiography (1980–2021)
- Rewards: Rajat Kamal (Silver Lotus); ₹2,00,000
- First award: 1976
- Most recent winner: Manas Choudhury, Bhool Bhulaiyaa 3 (2024)

The National Film Award for Best Sound Design is one of the National Film Awards presented annually by the National Film Development Corporation of India. It is one of several awards presented for feature films and awarded with Rajat Kamal (Silver Lotus).

The award was instituted in 1976, at 24th National Film Awards and awarded annually for films produced in the year across the country, in all Indian languages; Hindi (30 awards), Malayalam (15 awards), Bengali (10 awards), Tamil (9 awards), Marathi (5 awards), Telugu, Ladakhi (2 awards each), and Assamese, and Sanskrit (one award each).

Since the 57th National Film Awards the award has been sub-categorised into Location sound recordist, Sound designer and Re-recordist of the final mixed track. At the 70th National Film Awards, the award was renamed to Best Sound Design. Two sub-categories Location Sound Recordist and Re-recordist of the Final Mixed Track were discontinued, with only sound designer being eligible to the award. The decision to discontinue the two other sub-categories received some criticism.

== Winners ==
Awards legends
*	Location Sound Recordist (2009–2021)
*	Sound Designer (2009–2021)
*	Re-recordist of the Final Mixed Track (2009–2021)

Award includes 'Rajat Kamal' (Silver Lotus) and cash prize. Following are the award winners over the years:

List of award recipients, showing the year (award ceremony), film(s), language(s) and citation
Year	Recipient(s)	Film(s)	Language(s)	Refs.
1976 (24th)	S. P. Ramanathan	Bhakta Kannappa	Telugu	
1977 (25th)	S. P. Ramanathan	Godhuli	Hindi	
1978 (26th)	Hitendra Ghosh	Junoon	Hindi	
1979 (27th)	No Award			
1980 (28th)	S. P. Ramanathan	Nenjathai Killathe	Tamil	
1981 (29th)	P. Devdas	Elippathayam	Malayalam	
1982 (30th)	Essabhai M. Suratwala	Namkeen	Hindi	
1983 (31st)	S. P. Ramanathan	Adi Shankaracharya	Sanskrit	
1984 (32nd)	P. Devdas	Mukhamukham	Malayalam	
1985 (33rd)	Hitendra Ghosh	Ek Pal	Hindi	
1986 (34th)	Durga Mitra	Path Bhola	Bengali	
1986 (34th)	Jyoti Prasad Chatterjee	Path Bhola	Bengali	
1987 (35th)	P. Devadas	Anantaram	Malayalam	
1987 (35th)	T. Krishnanunni	Anantaram	Malayalam	
1987 (35th)	N. Harikumar	Anantaram	Malayalam	
1988 (36th)	T. Krishnan Unni	Piravi	Malayalam	
1989 (37th)	N. Harikumar	Mathilukal	Malayalam	
1990 (38th)	N. Pandurangan	Anjali	Tamil	
1991 (39th)	Ajay Munjan	Rukmavati Ki Haveli	Hindi	
1991 (39th)	M. M. Padmanabhan	Rukmavati Ki Haveli	Hindi	
1992 (40th)	N. Pandurangan	Thevar Magan	Tamil	
1993 (41st)	H. Sridhar	Mahanadi	Tamil	
1993 (41st)	K. M. Surya Narayan (M/s Media Artiste Pvt. Ltd)	Mahanadi	Tamil	
1994 (42nd)	A. S. Laxmi Narayanan	Kaadhalan	Tamil	
1994 (42nd)	V. S. Murthy	Kaadhalan	Tamil	
1995 (43rd)	Deepan Chatterji	Kalapani	Malayalam	
1995 (43rd)	Deepan Chatterji	Halo	Hindi	
1996 (44th)	Krishnan Unni	Desadanam	Malayalam	
1997 (45th)	Sampath	Ennu Swantham Janakikutty	Malayalam	
1998 (46th)	H. Sridhar	Dil Se..	Hindi	
1999 (47th)	Anup Mukhopadhyay	Uttara	Bengali	
2000 (48th)	Anup Dev	Moksha	Hindi	
2001 (49th)	H. Sridhar	Lagaan	Hindi	
2001 (49th)	Nakul Kamte	Lagaan	Hindi	
2002 (50th)	A. S. Laxmi Narayanan	Kannathil Muthamittal	Tamil	
2002 (50th)	H. Sridhar	Kannathil Muthamittal	Tamil	
2003 (51st)	Anup Mukhopadhyay	Bhalo Theko	Bengali	
2003 (51st)	Deepon Chatterjee	Bhalo Theko	Bengali	
2004 (52nd)	Anup Mukhopadhyay	Iti Srikanta	Bengali	
2004 (52nd)	Alok De	Iti Srikanta	Bengali	
2005 (53rd)	Nakul Kamte	Rang De Basanti	Hindi	
2006 (54th)	Shajith Koyeri	Omkara	Hindi	
2006 (54th)	Subhash Sahoo	Omkara	Hindi	
2006 (54th)	K. J. Singh	Omkara	Hindi	
2007 (55th)	Kunal Sharma	1971	Hindi	
2008 (56th)	Pramod J. Thomas	Gandha	Marathi	
2008 (56th)	Anmol Bhave	Gandha	Marathi	
2009 (57th)	Subash Sahoo	Kaminey	Hindi	
2009 (57th)	Resul Pookutty, Amrit Pritam Dutta	Keralavarma Pazhassiraja	Malayalam	
2009 (57th)	Anup Dev	3 Idiots	Hindi	
2010 (58th)	Kaamod Kharade	Ishqiya	Hindi	
2010 (58th)	Subhadeep Sengupta	Chitrasutram	Malayalam	
2010 (58th)	Debajit Changmai	Ishqiya	Hindi	
2011 (59th)	Baylon Fonseca	Zindagi Na Milegi Dobara	Hindi	
2011 (59th)	Baylon Fonseca	Game	Hindi	
2011 (59th)	Hitendra Ghosh	Game	Hindi	
2012 (60th)	Radhakrishnan S.	Annayum Rasoolum	Malayalam	
2012 (60th)	Anirban Sengupta	Shabdo	Bengali	
2012 (60th)	Dipankar Chaki	Shabdo	Bengali	
2012 (60th)	Alok De	• Gangs of Wasseypur – Part 1 • Gangs of Wasseypur – Part 2	Hindi	
2012 (60th)	Sinoy Joseph	• Gangs of Wasseypur – Part 1 • Gangs of Wasseypur – Part 2	Hindi	
2012 (60th)	Sreejesh Nair	• Gangs of Wasseypur – Part 1 • Gangs of Wasseypur – Part 2	Hindi	
2013 (61st)	Nihar Ranjan Samal	Madras Cafe	Hindi	
2013 (61st)	Bishwadeep Chatterjee	Madras Cafe	Hindi	
2013 (61st)	D. Yuvaraj	Swapaanam	Malayalam	
2014 (62nd)	Mahaveer Sabbanwal	Khwada	Marathi	
2014 (62nd)	Anish John	Asha Jaoar Majhe	Bengali	
2014 (62nd)	Anirban Sengupta	Nirbashito	Bengali	
2014 (62nd)	Dipankar Chaki	Nirbashito	Bengali	
2015 (63rd)	Sanjay Kurian	Talvar	Hindi	
2015 (63rd)	Bishwadeep Chatterjee	Bajirao Mastani	Hindi	
2015 (63rd)	Justin Jose	Bajirao Mastani	Hindi	
2016 (64th)	Jayadevan Chakkadath	Kaadu Pookkunna Neram	Malayalam	
2016 (64th)	Alok De	Ventilator	Marathi	
2017 (65th)	Mallika Das	Village Rockstars	Assamese	
2017 (65th)	Sanal George	Walking with the Wind	Ladakhi	
2017 (65th)	Justin Jose	Walking with the Wind	Ladakhi	
2018 (66th)	Gaurav Verma	Tendlya	Marathi	
2018 (66th)	Bishwadeep Chatterjee	Uri: The Surgical Strike	Hindi	
2018 (66th)	M. R. Rajakrishnan	Rangasthalam	Telugu	
2019 (67th)	Debajit Gayan	Iewduh	Khasi	
2019 (67th)	Mandar Kamalapurkar	Trijya	Marathi	
2019 (67th)	Resul Pookutty	Oththa Seruppu Size 7	Tamil	
2019 (67th)	Bibin Devassy	Oththa Seruppu Size 7	Tamil	
2020 (68th)	Anmol Bhave	Me Vasantrao	Marathi	
2020 (68th)	Vishnu Govind	Malik	Malayalam	
2021 (69th)	Arun Asok, Sonu KP	Chavittu	Malayalam	
2021 (69th)	Aneesh Basu	Jhilli	Bengali	
2021 (69th)	Sinoy Joseph	Sardar Udham	Hindi	
2022 (70th)	Anand Krishnamoorthi	Ponniyin Selvan: I	Tamil	
2023 (71st)	Sachin Sudhakaran Hariharan Muralidharan	Animal	Hindi	
2024 (72nd)	Manas Choudhury	Bhool Bhulaiyaa 3	Hindi	
