= Dr. Biju =

Indian film director

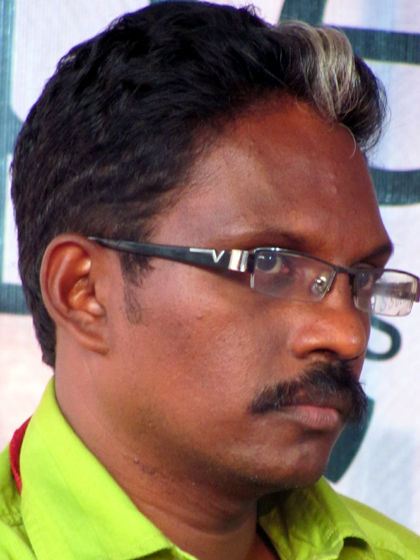
- Dr. Biju in 2010
- Born: May 31, 1971 (age 55); Kudassanad, Alappuzha, Kerala
- Occupations: Film director; doctor
- Years active: 2005–present
- Spouse: Vijayasree P
- Children: 1
- Website: drbiju.in

Bijukumar Damodaran, known mononymously as Dr. Biju, is an Indian film director and screenwriter. He is best known for films such as Saira (2005), Veettilekkulla Vazhi (2010), Akasathinte Niram (2012), Perariyathavar (2013), Valiya Chirakulla Pakshikal (2016), Sound of Silence (2017), Painting Life (2018) and Veyilmarangal (2019).

Biju has received three National Film Awards, and his films have been screened at multiple international film festivals and won numerous awards including the Golden Goblet Award for Best Artistic Achievement at the Shanghai Film Festival 2019. His films were screened at festivals including Cannes, Montreal, Shanghai, Telluride, Moscow, Cairo, Iran (Fajr), Eurasia, Almaty, Jeonju, Tallinn, Oporto, Dhaka, IFFK and IFFI.

== Career ==
Biju debuted into films as writer and director with Saira (2005). It was first part of terrorism trilogy and in 2007 premiered at the Cannes International Film Festival. His second film Raman (2008) was selected at Cairo International Film Festival (2009) in the Incredible India category. Veettilekkulla Vazhi (The Way Home; 2010) was last film of the trilogy and earned a National Film Award for best Malayalam film in 2010.

His fourth film Akasathinte Niram (Color of Sky; 2012), was premiered at 15th Shanghai International Film Festival in the International competition section. Biju's next film, Perariyathavar (Names Unknown, 2014) received two National Film Awards in 2014 for the Best Actor and Best film on Environment conservation, and was screened at the Montreal World Film Festival (2014).

In 2015, he directed Valiya Chirakulla Pakshikal (Birds With Large Wings; 2015) which was premiered at United Nations, Geneva as a part of the United Nations Environment Programme, and received National Film Award (2015) for the Best film on Environment conservation. His 2016 film Kaadu Pookkunna Neram (When The Woods Bloom) was premiered at the Eurasia International Film Festival, Asia Pacific Screen Awards, International Film Festival of Kerala, and the Montreal World Film Festival, in 2016.

In 2016, his next film Kaadu Pookkunna Neram premiered at Montreal World Film Festival (2016). In 2017, Dr.Biju directed his first non-Malayalam in Pahari, Hindi and Tibetan languages. The film Sound of Silence (2017 film) (2017) won the Best Director award at Kolkata International Film Festival (2017).

In 2018, Dr.Biju directed a film in English language titled Painting Life (2018). The film premiered at Montreal World Film Festival (2018). In 2019 Dr.Biju's tenth film Veyilmarangal (2019) premiered at Shanghai International Film Festival (2019). The film won the Golden Goblet award for outstanding artistic achievement.

In 2020, he directed the film House of Orange Trees which premiered at the Kolkata International Film Festival 2020. His next film The Portraits (2021) premiered at the Moscow International film festival 2021. In 2021 he directed his first film in Telugu language titled Sthalam (The Land). The film premiered at Dhaka International Film festival 2023.

== Filmography ==
Year	Original title	English title	Language
2005	Saira	Saira	Malayalam
2008	Raman	Travelogue of Invasion	Malayalam, English
2010	Veettilekkulla Vazhi	The Way Home	Malayalam
2012	Akasathinte Niram	Colour of Sky	Malayalam
2013	Perariyathavar	Names Unknown	Malayalam
2015	Valiya Chirakulla Pakshikal	Birds With Large Wings	Malayalam
2016	Kaadu Pookkunna Neram	When The Woods Bloom	Malayalam
2017	Sound of Silence	Sound of Silence	Hindi, Pahari
2018	Painting Life	Painting Life	English
2019	Veyilmarangal	Trees Under the Sun	Malayalam
2020	Orange Marangalude Veedu	House Of Orange Trees	Malayalam
2021	The Portraits	The Portraits	Malayalam
2022	Sthalam	The Land	Telugu
2023	Adrishya Jalakangal	Invisible Windows	Malayalam
2025	Papa Buka	Papa Buka	Tok Pisin

== Awards and honours ==
National Film Awards

Year	Category	Film	Result	Note
2010	Best Feature Film in Malayalam	Veettilekkulla Vazhi (The way home)	Won	
2013	Best Film on Environmental Conservation	Perariyathavar (Names Unknown)	Won	The film also won Best Actor Award to actor Suraj Venjaramoodu
2015	Best Film on Environmental Conservation	Valiya Chirakulla Pakshikal (Birds with large wings)	Won	

International Awards

Award	Film Festival/Organization	Year	Nominated work	Result
Golden Goblet award for Outstanding Artistic Achievement	22nd Shanghai International Film Festival	2019	Veyilmarangal (Trees Under The Sun)	Won
Jury Prize for Best Film	Festival des cinémas indiens de Toulouse/Toulouse Indian Film Festival, France	2020	Veyilmarangal (Trees Under The Sun)	Won
NETPAC Award for Best Malayalam Film	International Film Festival of Kerala	2019	Veyilmarangal (Trees Under The Sun)	Won
Best International Feature Film Award	Chongqing Pioneer Art Film Festival, China	2020	Veyilmarangal (Trees Under The Sun)	Won
Life Award	Imagineindia International Film Festival, Madrid, Spain	2022	The Portraits	Won
Critics award	Rajasthan International Film Festival, India	2022	The Portraits	Won
Prémio da Crítica (Critics award)	39th Oporto International film festival, Portugal,	2019	Painting Life	Won
Best Screen Play Award	Aurangabad International film festival	2019	Painting Life	Won
Best Director	23rd Kolkata International Film Festival India	2017	Sound Of Silence	Won
Best Film	Indian Film Festival Cincinnati Ohio, USA	2017	Sound Of Silence	Won
Special Jury Mention	Bangalore International Film Festival, India	2017	Kaadu Pookkunna Neram (When The Woods Bloom)	Won
World Humanitarian Award	Jakarta World Humanitarian Award	2015	Valiya Chirakulla Pakshikal (Birds With Large Wings)	Won
Best Film	Indian International Film Festival Queensland, Brisbane, Australia	2016	Valiya Chirakulla Pakshikal (Birds With Large Wings)	Won
Best Director	Indian International Film Festival Queensland, Brisbane, Australia	2016	Valiya Chirakulla Pakshikal (Birds With Large Wings)	Won
Best Screenplay	Indian International Film Festival Queensland, Brisbane, Australia	2016	Valiya Chirakulla Pakshikal (Birds With Large Wings)	Won
Best Film on Global Message	Jaipur International film festival	2015	Perariyathavar (Names Unknown)	Won
Best Screenplay award	New York Indian Film Festival, USA	2013	Akasathinte Niram (Color of Sky)	Won
NETPAC Award for Best Malayalam Film	15th International Film Festival of Kerala	2010	Veettilekkulla Vazhi (The Way Home)	Won
Signis Award – Commendation	Zanzibar International Film Festival, Tanzania	2011	Veettilekkulla Vazhi (The Way Home)	Won
Best Director	10Th Imagine India International Film Festival Madrid, Spain	2011	Veettilekkulla Vazhi (The Way Home)	Won
Best Film	10Th Imagine India International Film Festival Madrid, Spain	2011	Veettilekkulla Vazhi (The Way Home)	Won

Kerala State Film Awards

Year	Category	Film	Result
2010	Best Article on Cinema	"Kollaruthu Samvidhayakare"	Won
2011	Special Jury Award	Akasathinte Niram (Color of Sky)	Won
