= National Film Award for Best Film on Environment Conservation/Preservation =

Indian film award

- National award for contributions to Indian Cinema
- Awarded for: The best feature film focusing environmental concerns
- Sponsored by: Directorate of Film Festivals
- Rewards: Rajat Kamal (Silver Lotus); ₹50,000 (US$530)
- First award: 1989
- Final award: 2021
- Most recent winner: Aavasavyuham

Highlights
- Total awarded: 23
- First winner: Bonani

The National Film Award for Best Film on Environment Conservation/Preservation was one of the categories in the National Film Awards presented annually by the Directorate of Film Festivals, the organization set up by the Ministry of Information and Broadcasting in India. It was one of several awards presented for feature films and awarded with Rajat Kamal (Silver Lotus). At the 70th National Film Awards, the category was discontinued and combined with Best Film on Family Welfare, Best Film on National Integration and Best Film on Other Social Issues. The new award is named as Best Feature Film Promoting National, Social and Environmental Values.

The National Film Awards were established in 1954 to "encourage production of the films of a high aesthetic and technical standard and educational and culture value" and also planned to included awards for regional films. In 1989, at the 37th National Film Awards the new category of award for Best Film on Environment Conservation/Preservation was introduced for the Rajat Kamal and awarded annually for films produced in the year across the country, in all Indian languages. As of 2016 since its inception, the award has been present only nineteen times to unique films. It has been presented for films in eight languages with the highest being six in Malayalam and Kannada, two each in Assamese Marathi, Hindi and Odia, and one each in Bodo, Manipuri, and Tamil. It was not presented on nine occasion in 1990 (38th ceremony), 1991 (39th ceremony), 1996 (44th ceremony), 2001 (49th ceremony), 2002 (50th ceremony), 2006 (54th ceremony), 2007 (55th ceremony), 2009 (57th ceremony), and 2011 (59th ceremony).

The inaugural award was conferred upon the production house M/s Purbanchal Film Co-operative Society Ltd. (Rajat Kamal and ₹ 30,000) and director Jahnu Barua (Rajat Kamal and ₹ 15,000) for their Assamese film Bonani for the story of a lone forest officer fighting the illegal timber mafia and protecting rights of uneducated tribals. Kannada film director P. Sheshadri received the award in 2005 for his film Thutturi which was produced by Jayamala Ramchandra. He again won the award in 2010 for the film Bettada Jeeva produced by Basanta Kumar Patil. Malayalam film director Dr. Biju went on to receive the award in 2013 for his film Perariyathavar produced by Ambalakkara Global Films and again in 2015 for the film Valiya Chirakulla Pakshikal produced by A. K. Pillai. The most recent recipient of the award has been the Malayalam film Aavasavyuham directed by Krishand RK.

== Winners ==
The award includes 'Rajat Kamal' (Silver Lotus) and cash prize to the producers and director each. The first award in 1989 had a monetary association of ₹ 30,000 to the producers and ₹ 15,000 to the directors. In 1995 at the 43rd award ceremony the Bodo language film Rape in the Virgin Forest was honoured and the cash prices were revised to ₹ 30,000 each presented to Jwngdao Bodosa who had both produced and directed the film about the problems of deforestation and struggles of tribal people. The monetary association was again revised to ₹ 1,50,000 to both the producers and directors in 2008 at the 56th awarding ceremony where producer Akshay Parija and director Prashanta Nanda's Odia language film Jianta Bhoota (meaning "The Living Ghost") was the winner for its portrayal of lives of Dongria Kondh tribal people residing in the Niyamgiri hills range of Odisha.

Following are the award winners over the years:

List of films, showing the year (award ceremony), language(s), producer(s) and director(s)
Year	Film(s)	Language(s)	Producer(s)	Director(s)	Refs.
1989 (37th)	Bonani	Assamese	Purbanchal Film	Jahnu Barua	
1990 (38th)	No Award				
1991 (39th)	No Award				
1992 (40th)	Cheluvi	Hindi	Sadir Media	Girish Karnad	
1993 (41st)	Devara Kadu	Kannada	Pattabhirami Reddy Productions	Pattabhirami Reddy Tikkavarapu	
1994 (42nd)	Nirbachana	Odia	• NFDC • Doordarshan	Biplab Ray Chowdhury	
1995 (43rd)	Rape in the Virgin Forest (Hagramayao Jinahari)	Bodo	Jwngdao Bodosa	Jwngdao Bodosa	
1996 (44th)	No Award				
1997 (45th)	Bhoomi Geetha	Kannada	R. Mahadev Gowda	Kesari Harvoo	
1998 (46th)	Malli	Tamil	N'CYP	Santosh Sivan	
1999 (47th)	Jalamarmaram	Malayalam	• Latha Kurien Rajeev • Radhika Suresh Gopi	T. K. Rajeev Kumar	
2000 (48th)	Oru Cheru Punchiri	Malayalam	Jisha John	M. T. Vasudevan Nair	
2001 (49th)	No Award				
2002 (50th)	Urumattram	Tamil	Aadhi Bhagavan Talkies	B.Sivakumar	
2003 (51st)	Juye Poora Xoon	Assamese	Sanjib Sabhapandit	Sanjib Sabhapandit	
2004 (52nd)	Devrai	Marathi	Y. N. Oak	• Sumitra Bhave • Sunil Sukthankar	
2005 (53rd)	Thutturi	Kannada	Jaimala Ramchandra	P. Sheshadri	
2006 (54th)	No Award				
2007 (55th)	No Award				
2008 (56th)	Jianta Bhoota	Odia	Akshay Kumar Parija	Prashanta Nanda	
2009 (57th)	No Award				
2010 (58th)	Bettada Jeeva	Kannada	Basanta Kumar Patil	P. Sheshadri	
2011 (59th)	No Award				
2012 (60th)	Black Forest	Malayalam	Joshy Mathew	Baby Mathew Somatheeram	
2013 (61st)	Perariyathavar	Malayalam	Ambalakkara Global Films	Dr. Biju	
2014 (62nd)	Ottaal	Malayalam	Director Cutz Film Company	Jayaraj	
2015 (63rd)	Valiya Chirakulla Pakshikal	Malayalam	A. K. Pillai	Dr. Biju	
2016 (64th)	Loktak Lairembee	Manipuri	Haobam Paban Kumar	Haobam Paban Kumar	
2017 (65th)	Irada	Hindi	Irada Entertainment	Aparnaa Singh	
2018 (66th)	Paani	Marathi	Priyanka Chopra	Adinath Kothare	
2019 (67th)	Water Burial	Monpa	Faruque Iftikar	Shantanu Sen	
2020 (68th)	Taledanda	Kannada	• Hema Malini Krupakar • Arun Kumar R.	Praveen Krupakar	
2021 (69th)	Aavasavyuham	Malayalam	Krishand R. K.	Krishand R. K.	
