= Carbon (2018 film) =

2017 film directed by Venu

- Theatrical release poster
- Directed by: Venu
- Written by: Venu
- Produced by: Siby Thottupuram; Navis Xaviour
- Starring: Fahadh Faasil; Mamta Mohandas
- Cinematography: K. U. Mohanan
- Edited by: Beena Paul
- Music by: Songs: Vishal Bhardwaj; Background Score: Bijibal
- Production company: Poetry Film House
- Distributed by: Kalasangham Films
- Release date: 19 January 2018
- Running time: 146 minutes
- Country: India
- Language: Malayalam

Carbon is a 2018 Indian Malayalam-language adventure thriller film written and directed by Venu, starring Fahadh Faasil and Mamta Mohandas. The film follows Sebastian and Sameera on their expedition to find a lost treasure deep inside a forest. K. U. Mohanan was the cinematographer, while Vishal Bhardwaj and Bijibal composed the songs and the score, respectively. Principal photography took place between August and October 2017 in several hilly terrain locations in North Kerala.

Carbon was released in India on 19 January 2018 to a positive response from the critics, particularly praising the visuals and Fahadh Faasil's performance. The film won six Kerala State Film Awards, the most awards for any film for that year.

== Plot ==
Sibi is a young adult who wants to make it big in the quickest possible way. His search for his goal leads him to be the caretaker of a dilapidated palace. He plunges into the legends related to the palace and starts searching for a treasure hidden somewhere in the surrounding jungle.

== Cast ==
- Fahadh Faasil as Sibi Stephen
- Mamta Mohandas as Sameera
- Manikandan R. Achari as Stalin
- Dileesh Pothan as Thamban
- Soubin Shahir as Aanakkaran Rajesh
- Chethan Jayalal as Kannan
- Kochu Preman as Balan Pillai
- Spadikam George as Stephen Varkey
- Vijayaraghavan as M. D.
- Nedumudi Venu as Basheer
- Sharaf U Dheen as Santhosh
- Praveena as Deepa Pradeep
- Ashokan (Guest appearance)

== Production ==
According to Venu, Fahadh was in his mind for the lead role from the beginning, "It was conceptualised and written with Fahadh in mind and I could not have made the film with someone else". Principal photography began by mid-August 2017. It was originally scheduled to begin by the end of March, but the "state-of-the-art" movie camera the makers ordered from abroad arrived only by August. The first schedule of filming continued till mid-October was completed inside the forests in Kattappana, Idukki district. Later, it was shot in Erattupetta, Erumely, and Pala in Kottayam district, and in Wayanad. The film completely used sync sound. The film was shot in 12 locations, including Theni and Attappadi.

== Music ==
The original songs were composed by Vishal Bhardwaj, with lyrics by Rafeeq Ahamed. The film score was composed by Bijibal.

Track listing

- "Thanne Thaane" - Benny Dayal
- "Doore Doore" - Rekha Bhardwaj
- "Kaatin Sarangi" - Benny Dayal

== Release ==
The film was released on 19 January 2018.

=== Box office ===
The film collected $143,686 from 32 screens in the United Arab Emirates in the opening weekend (1 – 4 February) and $180,315 in two weeks.

=== Critical reception ===
Rating 4 out of 5 stars, Manoj Kumar R. of The Indian Express wrote "Venu has maintained a firm grip on the storytelling and beautifully brings out emotional conflicts in the characters in a well-written screenplay. Carbon is an engaging adventure film that should not be missed". Meera Suresh of The New Indian Express also gave 4 out of 5 and said "Carbon ultimately belongs to Venu. It is how he adds layers of meaning, without seeming to, that sets him apart. That he puts forth the most philosophical and thought-provoking concept in such an engaging and simple format is an attestation of his talent". The Times of India's Deepa Soman rated 3.5 out of 5 stars and noted that "though an adventure thriller that keeps us on the edge of our seats, Carbon also prods your thoughts, through the protagonist's journey, about these larger questions of purposes, revelations and perseverance". Baradwaj Rangan of Film Companion South wrote "The year has just dawned and I can state, with confidence, that it's unlikely we see a stranger film, so richly atmospheric, so lyrical and literal at once"

== Awards ==
Kerala State Film Awards

- Best Cinematographer - K. U. Mohanan
- Best Music Director - Vishal Bharadwaj
- Best Sound Recordist - Anil Radhakrishnan
- Best Sound Mixing - Sinoy Joseph
- Best Sound Design - Jayadevan Chakkadath
- Best Processing Lab/Colourist – Prime Focus
