= Veyilmarangal =

- Theatrical release poster
- Directed by: Bijukumar Damodaran
- Written by: Bijukumar Damodaran
- Produced by: Baby Mathew Somatheeram
- Starring: Indrans; Prakash Bare; Sarita Kukku
- Cinematography: M. J. Radhakrishnan
- Edited by: Davis Manuel
- Music by: Bijibal
- Production company: Soma Creations
- Distributed by: Planet One Films
- Release dates: 16 June 2019 (Shanghai International Film Festival); 28 February 2020
- Running time: 108 minutes
- Country: India
- Language: Malayalam

Veyilmarangal (lit. 'Trees Under The Sun') is a Malayalam language drama film written and directed by Bijukumar Damodaran and produced by Baby Mathew Somatheeram. The film starring Indrans and Prakash Bare has M. J. Radhakrishnan as cinematographer. It revolves around a Dalit family that moves to Himachal Pradesh from Kerala for betterment, but harsh conditions still pursue them.

Veyilmarangal is the first Indian film to win an award in main competition for Golden Goblet in Shanghai International Film Festival. The film was theatrically released on 28 February 2020.

== Cast ==
- Indrans
- Saritha Kukku
- Krishnan Balakrishnan
- Prakash Bare
- Master Govardhan
- Ashok Kumar
- Nariyapuram Venu
- Melvin Williams

== Release ==
The film was theatrically released on 28 February 2020.

== Awards ==
- Outstanding Artistic Achievement award at Shanghai International Film Festival.
- Best actor award for Indrans at Singapore South Asian International Film Festival
- NETPAC Award for Best Malayalam Film at International Film Festival of Kerala
- Jury Prize for Best Film at 8th Festival des cinémas indiens de Toulouse/Toulouse Indian Film Festival, France.
- Best International Feature Film Award at Chongqing Pioneer Art Film Festival, China 2020

== Festival selections ==
- 2019 Shanghai International Film Festival, China 22nd festival - Official Competition for Golden Goblet
- Singapore South Asia Film Festival, 2019- Official Competition
- Asia Pacific screen awards, Australia 2019- In Competition
- 25th Kolkata International Film Festival 2019 – In Indian film Competition
- 14th Jogja-NETPAC Asian Film Festival, Indonesia 2019- Asian Perspective section
- 18th Dhaka International Film Festival, Bangladesh 2020- Asian Competition
- 24th International Film Festival Kerala, 2019 – New Malayalam Cinema Competition
- 50th International Film Festival of India, Goa, 2019 – Indian cinema section
- Pune International Film Festival, India 2020 – Indian Cinema Section.
- Aurangabad International Film Festival, India 2020 – Indian Competition.
- Chennai Independent Film Festival, India 2020 – Opening Film
- Toulouse Indian Film Festival, France, April 2020.
- Chongqing Pioneer Art Film Festival, China 2020.
- 2021 Jakarta Film Week, Jakarta, 2021
