= Ottakkayyan =

2007 film by G. R. Indugopan

- Directed by: G. R. Indugopan
- Written by: G. R. Indugopan
- Produced by: S. Dr. Ananthakrishnan; Vidhubal Chithra; Benny Kattappana; Sanooj Surendranath; Dileep Viswanath
- Starring: Harisree Ashokan; Rani Babu; Ashokan; Arun
- Cinematography: M. J. Radhakrishnan
- Edited by: Vijayakumar
- Music by: Paris Chandran; Samad Priyadarshini
- Release date: 26 October 2007
- Running time: 79 minutes
- Country: India
- Language: Malayalam

Ottakkayyan is a 2007 Malayalam film by G. R. Indugopan starring Harisree Ashokan, Rani Babu, Ashokan, and Arun. This movie marks the debut of Harisree Ashokan in the lead role.

== Plot ==
Two members of different fundamentalist groups get trapped in a remote island on a midnight, after committing a murder. The island is connected to the main land only through a rail link, which is filled with rioting crowds. The young men comes into contact with the only inhabitants of the island, Ottakkayyan Vasu, his wife and father-in-law. From there the story develops into an unpredictable end.

== Cast ==
- Harisree Ashokan as Ottakkayyan Vasu
- Rani Babu as Vasu's Wife
- Ashokan as Mr. B
- Arun as Mr. A
- T. G. Ravi as Kallathokku Kanaran
- Machan Varghese as Vasu's Brother in law

== Awards ==
Kerala State Awards 2007

- Acting – Special Jury Mention - T G Ravi
- Best Cinematography - M.J. Radhakrishnan
- Best Sound Recording - T. Krishnanunni
