= Beena Paul =

Indian film editor

Bina Paul
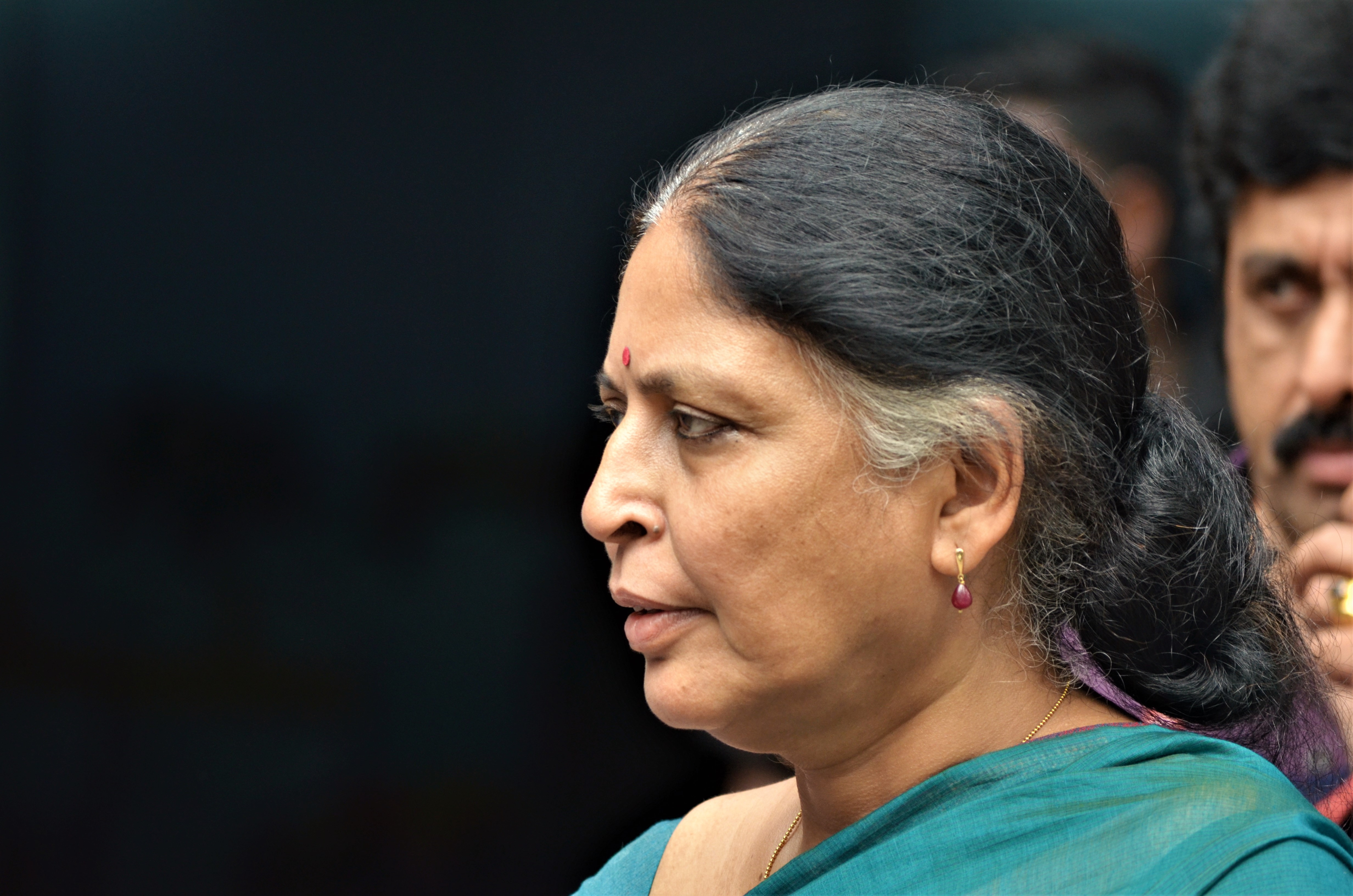
- Bina Paul at IFFK, Thiruvananthapuram, in 2017
- Born: 28 January 1961 (age 65); Delhi, India
- Years active: 1985–present
- Spouse: Venu (m. 1983)
- Children: Malavika

Bina Paul (born January 28, 1961), also known by her married name Bina Paul Venugopal, is an Indian film editor who works mainly in Malayalam-language films. A graduate of the University of Delhi, she completed a course on film editing from the Film and Television Institute of India (FTII), Pune, in 1983.

She is the recipient of two National Film Awards and three Kerala State Film Awards. She has held several positions including the artistic director of International Film Festival of Kerala (IFFK) and the vice chairperson of Kerala State Chalachitra Academy.

== Personal life ==
She has been married to cinematographer Venu since 26 August 1983. The couple has a daughter, Malavika, who is married and is the manager of the Great North Museum: Hancock, England.

== Biography ==
=== Early life ===
Born to a Malayali father and a Kannadiga mother, Bina Paul was brought up in Delhi. After graduating from the University of Delhi in 1979 with a bachelor's degree in psychology, she went on to pursue a diploma in film editing from the Film and Television Institute of India (FTII), Pune, in 1983.

=== Career ===
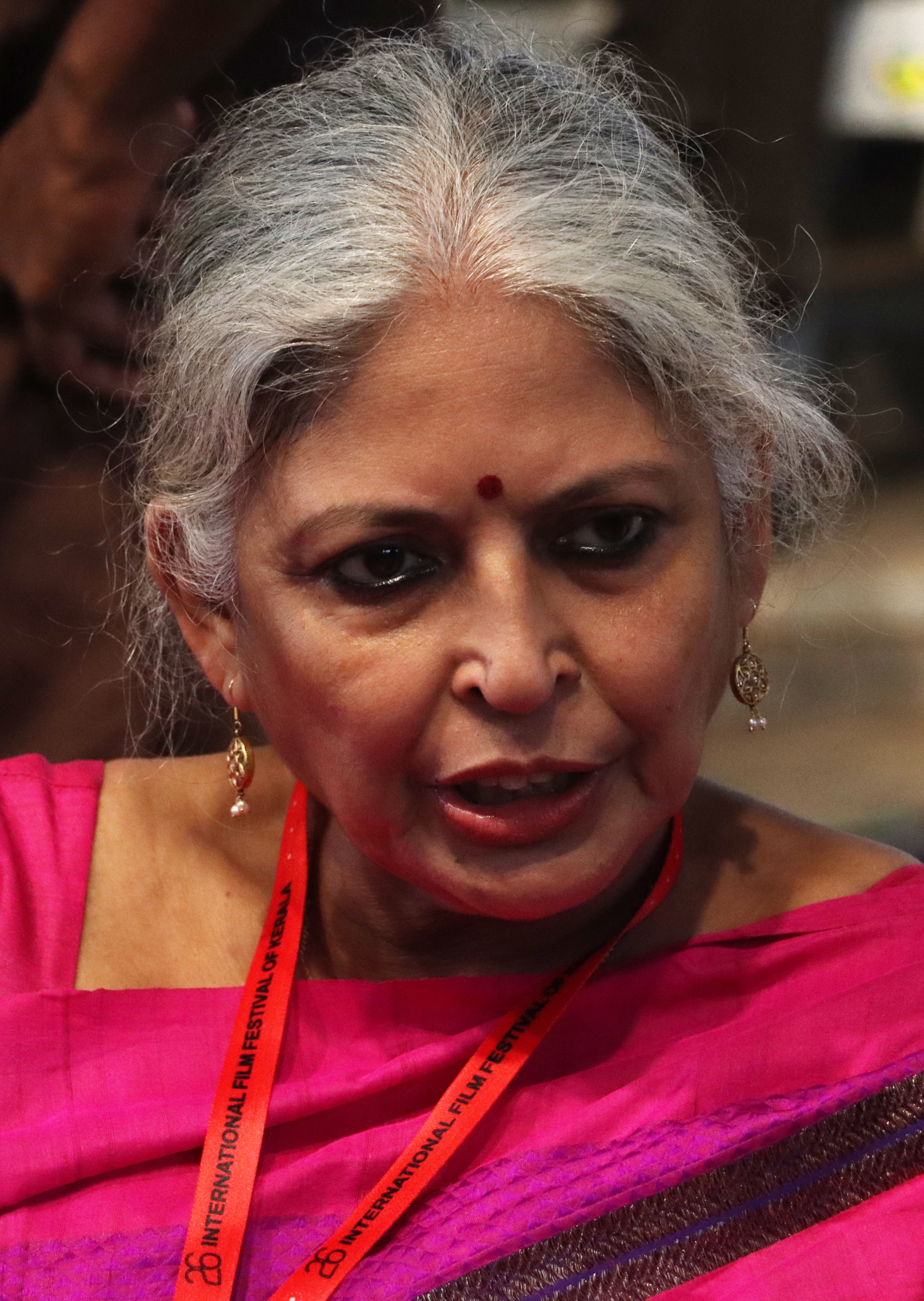
Bina Paul at the 26th IFFK

Bina got a break as an editor with G. Aravindan's The Seer Who Walks Alone (1985), a documentary on Jiddu Krishnamurti. She went on to work in a few documentaries including Rajiv Vijay Raghavan's Sister Alphonsa of Bharananganam (1986), which won the Best Biographical Film at the 34th National Film Awards. She made her feature film debut with John Abraham's Amma Ariyan (1986). Her other films include Padippura (1989), Janmadinam (1997), Agnisakshi (1999). Her work in Revathi's Mitr, My Friend (2002), which had an all-woman crew, won her her first National Film Award. The following year, she was awarded another National Film Award for the non-feature film Unni. She has also worked in television and has been the recipient of three Kerala State Television Award for Best Editor.

Apart from editing over 50 documentaries and feature films, Paul has directed four documentaries. She has collaborated with women filmmakers like Revathi, Suma Josson, Pamela Rooks and Shabnam Virmani.

Paul played a prominent role in shaping up the International Film Festival of Kerala (IFFK) right from its inception and also served as its artistic director. She also served as the deputy director (festival) of Kerala State Chalachitra Academy and worked as a senior editor at the Centre for Development of Imaging Technology. She served as the principal of the L. V. Prasad Film Academy (Thiruvananthapuram campus). In February 2017, she co-founded the Women in Cinema Collective, India's first association that aims to work towards equal opportunity and dignity of women employees in film industry.

=== Personal life ===
Beena married director - cinematographer Venu, a fellow student at the FTII, in 1983; the couple has a daughter. The two have worked together in several films including Daya (1998), Munnariyippu (2014) and Carbon(2018), all directed by Venu.

== Selected filmography ==
- The Seer Who Walks Alone (1985)
- Sister Alphonsa of Bharananganam (1986)
- Amma Ariyan (1986)
- Padippura (1989)
- When Women Unite (1996)
- Daya (1998)
- Janmadinam (1998)
- Agnisakshi (1999)
- Angene Oru Avadhikkalathu (1999)
- Janani (1999)
- Saree (1999)
- Mazha (2000)
- Oru Cheru Punchiri (2000)
- Sayahnam (2000)
- Jeevan Masai (2001)
- Meghamalhar (2002)
- Mitr, My Friend (2002)
- Sthithi (2002)
- Dance like a Man (2003)
- In Othello (2003)
- Margam (2003)
- Ee Snehatheerathu (2004)
- Nerkku Nere (2004)
- Daivanamathil (2005)
- Kamli (2006)
- Chaurahen (2007)
- Kaiyoppu (2007)
- Bioscope (2008)
- Vilapangalkkappuram (2009)
- Patham Nilayile Theevandi (2009)
- Punyam Aham (2010)
- The Desire (2010)
- Inganeyum Oral (2010)
- Karmayogi (2012)
- Munnariyippu (2014)
- Sometimes (2017)
- Carbon (2018)
- Savithri - Aanum Pennum (2021)
- Headmaster (2022)

== Awards ==
=== National Film Awards ===
- Best Editing – Mitr, My Friend (2002)
- Best Non-Feature Film Editing – Unni (2003)

=== Kerala State Film Awards ===
- Best Editor – Daya (1998)
- Best Editor – Sayahnam (2000)
- Best Editor – Bioscope (2008)
