= Veettilekkulla Vazhi =

- Poster
- Directed by: Dr. Biju
- Written by: Dr. Biju
- Produced by: B. C. Joshi
- Starring: Prithviraj Sukumaran; Indrajith Sukumaran; Malavika; Master Govardhan; Dhanya Mary Varghese; Kiran Raj; Vinay Forrt; Assim Jamal
- Cinematography: M. J. Radhakrishnan
- Edited by: Manoj Kannoth
- Music by: Ramesh Narayan
- Production company: Soorya Cinema
- Release dates: 22 October 2010 (Mumbai Film Festival); 5 August 2011 (Kerala)
- Running time: 95 minutes
- Country: India
- Language: Malayalam

Veettilekkulla Vazhi (transl. The Way Home) is a 2010 Indian Malayalam adventure drama film written and directed by Dr. Biju. The film is about terrorist organizations operating in India and how they recruit young Keralites. It stars Prithviraj, Indrajith and Master Govardhan in the lead roles.

The film's world premiere took place at the 12th Mumbai Film Festival on 22 October 2010 as the opening film in the Indian Frames section. It was an official selection for 28 international film festivals. It won the award for Best Feature Film in Malayalam at the 58th National Film Awards and the NETPAC Award. It also received accolades at the Zanzibar International Film Festival and Imagine India Film Festival, Spain. The film was released in theatres in Kerala on 5 August 2011.

== Cast ==
- Prithviraj as Doctor
- Master Govardhan as Kid
- Malvika Sharma as Wife of doctor
- Indrajith as Rassaq, a Tamil Terrorist
- Irshad as Abdulla
- Vinay Forrt as Terrorist Leader in Ajmeer
- S.Saji as Malayali Terrorist
- Melwyn as Sardarji Truck Driver
- Kiran Raj as Najeem
- Assim Jamal as Terrorist Leader at Kashmir
- Lakshmipriya as Rashida as Kid's mother
- Dhanya Mary Varghese as Teacher

== Production ==
Veettilekkulla Vazhi is the third directorial venture of Dr. Biju whose previous films are Saira and Raman. Veettilekkulla Vazhi is an adventure drama that wants to explore the bloodstained facets of present-day terrorism. Produced by B. C. Joshi under the banner of Soorya Cinema, the film was mainly shot from Ladakh, Kashmir, Jaisalmer, Jodhpur, Bikkneer, Ajmer, Pushkarand, Delhi and Kerala.

== Festival screenings ==
The film was screened at 28 international film festivals including:

- 12th Mumbai Film Festival (Mumbai, India; 2010) as the opening film in the Indian Frames section.
- 34th Cairo International Film Festival (Egypt; 2010) in the Out of Competition section.
- 15th International Film Festival of Kerala (Trivandrum, India; 2010)
- 3rd Jaipur International Film Festival (Jaipur, India; 2011)
- 5th Chennai International Film Festival (Chennai, India; 2011)
- 10th Imagine India International Film Festival (Madrid, Spain; 2011) in competition section.
- 11th New York Indian Film Festival (New York, USA; 2011) in competition section
- Zanzibar International Film Festival (Zanzibar, Tanzania; 2011)
- London Indian Film Festival (London, UK; 2011)
- Bollywood and Beyond Film Festival (Germany; 2011)
- 38th Telluride Film Festival (Telluride, USA; 2011)
- New Generation Film Festival (Frankfurt, Germany; 2011)
- Third Eye Asian Film Festival (Mumbai, India; 2011)
- Seattle Film Festival (Seattle, USA; 2011)

== Accolades ==
Award	Ceremony	Category	Recipients and nominees	Outcome
Imagine India Film Festival	10th Imagine India Film Festival (2011; Spain)	Best Film	Veettilekkulla Vazhi	Won
Imagine India Film Festival	10th Imagine India Film Festival (2011; Spain)	Best Director	Dr. Biju	Won
Imagine India Film Festival	10th Imagine India Film Festival (2011; Spain)	Best Music Director	Ramesh Narayan	Won
International Film Festival of Kerala	15th International Film Festival of Kerala (2010; India)	NETPAC Award for Best Malayalam Film	Veettilekkulla Vazhi	Won
Kerala State Film Awards	Kerala State Film Awards (2011; India)	Best Cinematography	M. J. Radhakrishnan	Won
Kerala State Film Awards	Kerala State Film Awards (2011; India)	Best Processing Lab		Won
National Film Awards	58th National Film Awards (2011; India)	Best Feature Film in Malayalam	Veettilekkulla Vazhi	Won
Zanzibar International Film Festival	14th Zanzibar International Film Festival (2011; Tanzania)	Signis Award (Commendation)	Dr. Biju	Won
Zanzibar International Film Festival	14th Zanzibar International Film Festival (2011; Tanzania)	Industry Award for Best Cinematography	M. J. Radhakrishnan	Won
