= Atayalangal =

- A still from the movie
- Directed by: M. G. Sasi
- Written by: M. G. Sasi
- Based on: Anubhavangal by Nandanar
- Produced by: Aravind Venugopal
- Starring: Govind Padmasoorya; Jyothirmayi; T. G. Ravi; Anirudh Ravi; Sathi; V. K. Sreeraman
- Cinematography: MJ Radhakrishnan
- Music by: Vidyadharan
- Production company: Valluvanadan Talkies
- Release date: 5 September 2008
- Country: India
- Language: Malayalam

Atayalangal (English: The Imprints) is a 2008 Malayalam-language biographical drama film directed by M.G. Sasi and produced by Aravind Venugopal under the banner Valluvanadan Talkies. Govind Padmasoorya plays the lead role of autobiographical character of Nandanar (1926–1974), well known for his child literature and philosophical army stories. The film is particularly based on Nandanar's autobiography Anubhavangal.

== Premise ==
Set in the backdrop of a Valluvanadan hamlet in Kerala, the film depicts the three different types of hunger of human life: that of body, spirit, and mind. Jyothirmayi plays the female lead role of Meenakshikutty whose love transforms the hero into a soldier fighting for his cause. The film opened in Kerala theatres on 5 September, after several post-production difficulties.

Director M. G. Sasi has commented, "Atayalangal takes you through the kaleidoscopic world which Nandanar created through his works comprising children's literature, re-creations of rural life and stories which smell of blood and gunpowder. Hunger is the leitmotif of the film, especially hunger of the body and mind. The movie presents in a framework all these hungers, heightened or lessened, which form the substance of all human life in all ages."

== Cast ==
- Master Anirudh Ravi / Govind Padmasoorya / Govind Menon -Padathuparambil Gopinathan (Gopi)
- Jyothirmayi - Meenakshikutty
- T. G. Ravi - Raman Namboothiri
- V. K. Sreeraman - Damu ettan
- Sathi Premji - Amma (Madhavi)
- T. V. Chandran - Bhaskara Kuruppu
- Madampu Kunjukuttan -Adhikari namboothiri
- Manikandan Pattambi - Ravunni
- C.K.Babu- Velichappadu
- Sobha Teacher - Valyamma
- M.G.Shailaja - Cheriyamma
- Geetha Joseph - Kunjeduthi
- Leela Namboothirippadu - Muttashi
- Pariyanampatta Divakaran - Achan
- Harigovindan - Cheriya Pothuwal
- Madhu - Valya Pothuwal
- Master Ullas - Ramankutty
- Baby Medha - Malootty

== Awards ==
Kerala State Film Award, 2008

- Kerala State Film Award for Best Film
- Kerala State Film Award for Best Cinematography - M. J. Radhakrishnan
- Kerala State Film Award for Best Director - M.G. Sasi
- Kerala State Film Award for Best Processing Lab - Prasad Colour Lab
- Kerala State Film Award (Special Jury Award)- T. G. Ravi

International Film Festival of Kerala

- IFFK 2008 - NETPAC award for the best Malayalam film

Aravindan National Awards

- Special Jury Mention for Best Film of a Debutante Director

Amrita Film awards, 2008

- Best cameraman - M. J. Radhakrishnan
