= Painting Life =

English Indian film

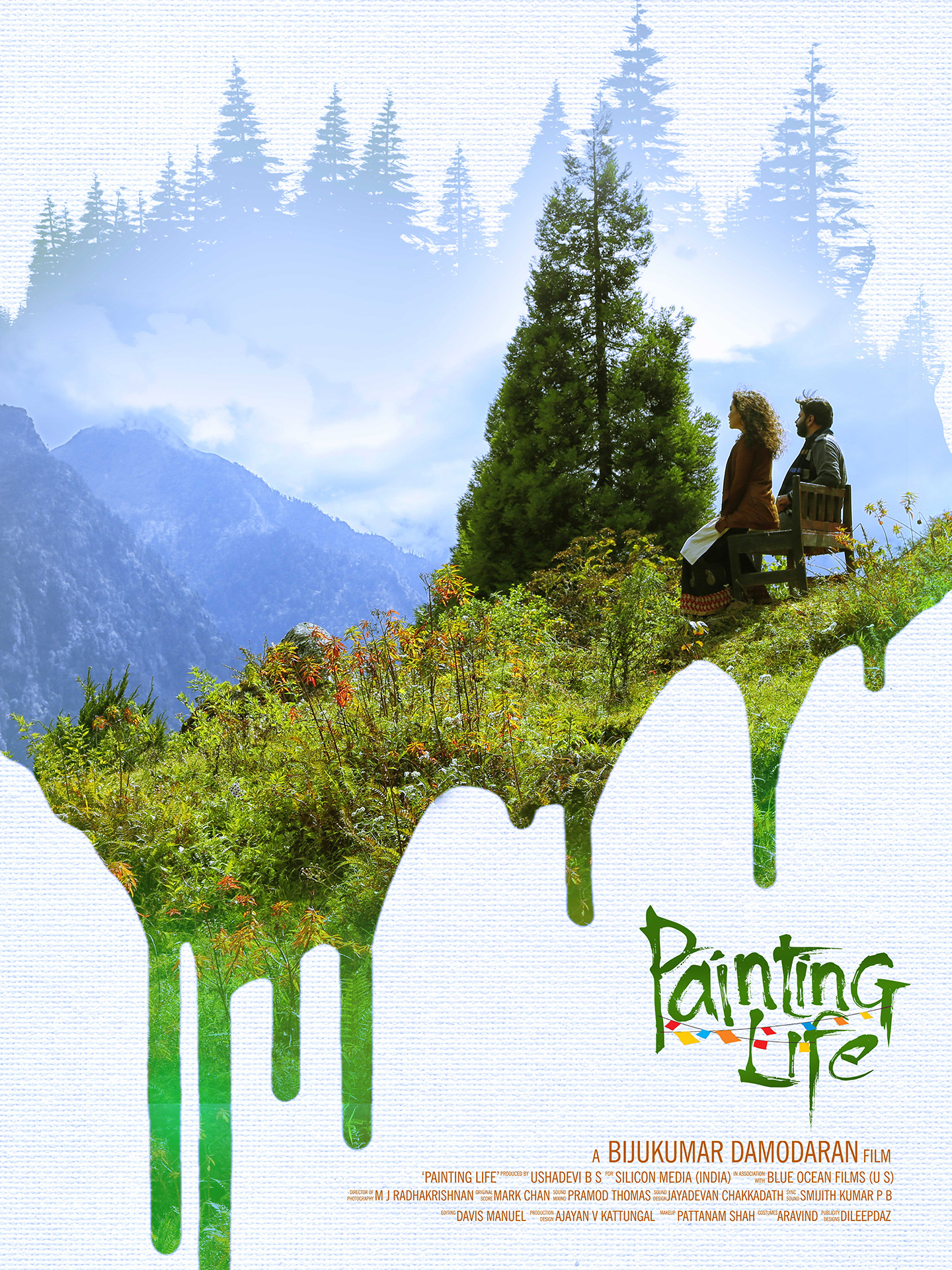
- Official poster
- Directed by: Dr. Biju
- Written by: Dr. Biju
- Produced by: Ushadevi BS
- Starring: Prakash Bare; Geetanjali Thapa; Ritabhari Chakraborty; Shankar Ramakrishnan; Purav Goswami; Ravi Singh; Krishnan Balakrishnan; Noksha Saham; Phuntsok Ladakhi; Meera Vasudevan; Melwyn William
- Cinematography: M. J. Radhakrishnan
- Edited by: Davis Manuel
- Music by: Mark Chan
- Production companies: Silicon Media & BlueOcean Pictures
- Release date: October 27, 2018 (Hanoi International Film Festival)
- Running time: 140 minutes
- Countries: India, US
- Language: English

Painting Life is a 2018 Indian English film written and directed by Bijukumar Damodaran (commonly known as Dr. Biju). The film was jointly produced by Silicon Media and Blue Ocean Pictures and depicts the experience of a film crew who are stranded in a remote Himalayan village.

== Plot ==
The crew, led by a Bollywood filmmaker, arrives in the Himalayas to shoot a song and dance sequence for their upcoming blockbuster. However, after torrential downpours and landslides, they find themselves cut off from the outside world with no basic amenities or means of communication, at the mercy of nature.

This scenario describes a common theme in many reality TV shows, particularly those centered around survival, adventure, or cultural exploration. The contrast between the fast-paced, urban lifestyle and the slower, more challenging conditions in a rural or remote setting creates dramatic tension and often serves as a backdrop for personal growth and development among the participants. This theme has been explored in various reality TV formats, each with its unique twist and focus on different aspects of the human experience.

The director, a commercially successful filmmaker, regards cinema primarily as entertainment business with no connection to the real-world or social issues. He initially views the valley only as a scenic location for his shoot. Following a series of events during the production, he becomes aware of the hardships faced by the region and its residents. The film explores how this awareness affects his personal outlook and his approach to filmmaking.

== Cast ==
- Prakash Bare as Filmmaker
- Geetanjali Thapa as Lady in the guest house
- Shankar Ramakrishnan as Nassar
- Ritabhari Chakraborty as Actress
- Meera Vasudev as Wife (Guest appearance)
- Ravi Singh as Cinematographer
- Purav Goswami as Associate Director
- Krishnan Balakrishnan as Asst Director
- Melwyn Williams as Production Controller
- Noksha Saham as Hunter
- Phuntsok Ladakhi as Monk
- Tensing Lepcha as Hotel boy
- Kinsong Bhutia as Guesthouse manager
- Govardhan BK as Hotel boy
- Yangcho Bhutia as Girl from the village
- Arjun Subba as Boy from the village

== Crew ==
Painting Life is the first English feature film directed by Dr. Biju, whose earlier eight films won national film awards.

M. J. Radhakrishnan, a seven-time winner of Kerala State Film Awards for Best Cinematography, is behind the camera.

Singaporean composer Mark Chan composed the background score of the film. The sound design, recording and mixing are performed by Jayadevan Chakkadath and Pramod Thomas. The film is co-produced by Silicon Media.

== Production ==
=== Casting ===
Painting Life is a pan-Indian project with a cast and crew from 10 different Indian states. The cast of the film includes Prakash Bare (Bangalore), Geetanjali Thapa (Mumbai), Ritabhari Chakraborty (Kolkata), Shankar Ramakrishnan (Kerala), Ravi Singh (Mumbai), Purav Goswami (Assam), Meera Vasudevan(Mumbai), Phuntsok Ladakhi (Jammu), Noksha Saham (Arunachal), Kinzong Bhutia (Sikkim), Master Govardhan(Kerala), Tensing Lepcha (Sikkim), Melwyn Williams (Delhi), Krishnan Balakrishnan (Kerala), Yancho Bhutia (Sikkim) and Arjun (Sikkim).

=== Filming ===
The film is shot entirely in Sikkim, an Indian state that borders China. The movie also talks about the dam construction which has impacted the ecology of this area. A number of NGOs and activists from the state, who continue to work against projects that threaten the ecosystem of Sikkim, were associated with the movie both on and behind the camera.

== Festival Selections and Awards ==
- Winner Best Screen Play award at Aurangabad International film festival 2019
- Winner Premios Da Critica (Critics award) at 39th Oporto International film festival, Portugal, 2019
- Winner best cinematography at Indian Film festival Cincinnati, Ohio 2019 September
- Montreal World Film Festival, August 2018 in World Greats
- Almaty Film festival, September 2018 in Main competition
- Hanoi International Film Festival, October 2018 in Panorama
- Jogja NETPAC Asian Film Festival, November 2018 in Asian Perspective
- All Lights International Film festival, Hyderabad, December 2018 in Main competition
- International Film festival of Kerala in December 2018 in the section Indian Cinema Now
- Dhaka International Film Festival in December 2018 in Asian Film Competition section
- 13th Ethiopian International Film Festival in December 2018 in World Cinema section
- 16th Chennai International Film Festival in December 2018
- 6th Aurangabad International Film Festival in January 2019 in the Competition section
- 11th Jaipur International Film Festival in January 2019
- Fantasporto 2019: 39th Oporto International Film Festival, Portugal in February 2019 in two Competition sections Director's week and Oriental Express
- Buddhist International Film Festival, Dikshabhumi, Nagpur. January 2019
- South East Asia film exhibition, Kunming, China. June 10 to 14
- Asian Film Festival Barcelona, Spain. 31 October to 10 November
- In Competition, Indian film festival Cincinnati, Ohio September 2019
- Buddhist film festival New Delhi, October 2019.
- Buddhist film festival Patna, October 2019
- Indian Monographic Film Week, Canary Island, Spain, June 2020
