= K. U. Mohanan =

Indian film cinematographer

- Born: Payyanur, Kannur, Kerala, India
- Education: Film and Television Institute of India, Pune
- Occupation: Director of Photography
- Children: Malavika Mohanan (daughter)
- Parent: P G Poduval (father)

K. U. Mohanan is an Indian film cinematographer who primarily works in the Bollywood and Malayalam film industries. He is an alumnus of the Film and Television Institute of India, Pune. He has worked in several documentaries and Non feature films in his early days. He is a member of the Indian Society of Cinematographers (ISC).

== Early life ==
Mohanan was born into a Hindu family. His father, P. G. Poduval, was a well-known Kolkali singer in Payyanur, Kannur, Kerala. He is the father of actress Malavika Mohanan.

== Filmography ==
Year	Film	Language	Notes
1990	Aadhi Haqeeqat, Aadha Fasana	Hindi	Documentary
1994	English, August	English	
1997	The Magnificent Ruin	Hindi	TV
1999	Naukar Ki Kameez	Hindi	
1999	Hum Dil De Chuke Sanam	Hindi	Additional Cinematography
2000	Shayanam	Malayalam	Film by MP Sukumaran Nair
2001	Valon Ja Varjon Huoneet	Hindi	Documentary
2001	Lagaan	Hindi	Additional Cinematography
2003	Freaky Chakra	English	
2003	Samay: When Time Strikes	Hindi	
2005	John & Jane	English	Documentary
2006	Don	Hindi	
2007	Aaja Nachle	Hindi	
2010	We Are Family	Hindi	
2012	Miss Lovely	Hindi	
2012	Celluloid Man	Multilingual	Documentary
2012	Talaash	Hindi	
2013	Ezhu Sundara Rathrikal	Malayalam	
2013	Fukrey	Hindi	
2017	Raees	Hindi	
2017	Jab Harry Met Sejal	Hindi	
2018	Carbon	Malayalam	
2018	Lust Stories	Hindi	Anthology; Dibakar Banerjee's segment
2018	Andhadhun	Hindi	
2019	Maharshi	Telugu	Debut in Telugu cinema
2022	Raksha Bandhan	Hindi	
2022	Phone Bhoot	Hindi	
2024	Aadujeevitham	Malayalam	Uncredited
2024	The Family Star	Telugu	
2024	Agni	Hindi	
2026	Satluj	Hindi	

== Awards ==
- Nominated, Filmfare Award for Best Cinematographer (2015) - Miss Lovely
- Nominated, SIIMA Award for Best Cinematographer (2019) - Maharshi
- Kerala State Film Award for Best Cinematography for Carbon in the year 2018.
- Won Golden Sparrow for Best Cinematography at 1st Diorama International Film Festival & Market (2019) - Andhadhun

== See also ==
- Indian cinematographers
- Cinema of India
