= K. M. Madhusudhanan =

Indian film maker and artist

Madhusudhanan
- Born: 1956 (age 69–70); Alapuzha Kerala, India
- Occupations: Film director, painter
- Spouse: Anuradha Madhusudhanan
- Children: 1
- Awards: Kerala State Film Awards; National Film Awards
- Website: www.madhusudhananstudio.com

Madhusudhanan (born 1956 in Alappuzha, Kerala, India) is an Indian film maker and artist, also known as K. M. Madhusudhanan. His debut feature film was Bioscope (2008).

== Early life and education ==
K. M. Madhusudhanan was born in 1956 in Alappuzha, Kerala. He studied painting at College of Fine Arts Trivandrum, Kerala, and print making at the Faculty of Maharaja Sayajirao University of Baroda.

== Work ==
Feature film : Bioscope (2008 film)

- 2014- The Marx Archive - The Logic of Disappearance (installation) collection: Kiran Nadar Museum of Art, New Delhi
- 2014- 2015- Penal colony (Installation) Collection : collection: Kiran Nadar Museum of Art, New Delhi
- 2008- Bioscope (2008 film): Feature Film, produced by National Film Development Corporation of India
- 2007- History is a Silent Film (Video Art)
- 2018- Rage, rage against the dying of the light (Light Installation)

== Exhibitions ==
=== Solo ===
- 56th Venice Biennale, Italy: 'All the World's Futures', Curated by Okwui Enwezor: 9 May 2015 - 22 November 2015
- Kochi Muziris Biennale, Noida, India: 'Whorled Explorations', curated by Jitish Kallat: 12 December 2014 - 29 March 2015
- Kiran Nadar Museum of Art, Noida, India: Pond Near the Field: 25 November 2015 - 29 February 2016
- Delhi Art Fair, Vadehra Art Gallery: 28 January 2016 - 31 January 2016
- 2016 Penal Colony, Vadehra Art Gallery
- 2016 Meanwhile, What About Socialism? Solo booth at AV Festival, New Castle, UK
- 2018 Granite lamp and mirror, Vadehra gallery, New Delhi

=== Group ===
- 2021 Lokame tharavadu- curated by Bose Krishnamachaari, organised by Kochi Muziris biennale, Alappuzha, Kerala
- 2020 Abudhabi Art fair, 1+1 gallery, Dubai

== Filmography ==
- Balamaniyamma- Documentary, English, Malayalam, 1997
- O.V. Vijayan- English, Malayalam, Documentary, 2000
- Self Portrait- Short Fiction, Hindi, 2001
- History is a Silent Film, Short Fiction, Silent, 2006
- Mayabazaar- Documentary, Telugu, English, 2006
- Razor, Blood and Other Tales- Short Fiction, Silent, 2007
- Bioscope, Feature Film, Malayalam, Tamil, 2008
- Theeppanakkam, Short Documentary, Malayalam 2024

== Awards and recognition ==
=== for Bioscope (2008 film) ===
- 2008 National Film Award – Special Jury Award (feature film) for Bioscope (2008 film)
- Osian Cinefan International Film Festival, NETPAC Jury Award for Best Asian Film
- Special Mention Jury Award, Mannheim-Heidelberg International Festival, Germany
- 2008 Best Cinematography Award, SAIFF, New York
- 2008 five Kerala State Film Awards as Special Jury Award for Direction, Best Cinematography, Best Editing, Best Background Score.

== Books and articles ==
- A Turning Point, Interview, Screen India
