= Kudassanad =

Kudassanad Thettikuzhy
- Village
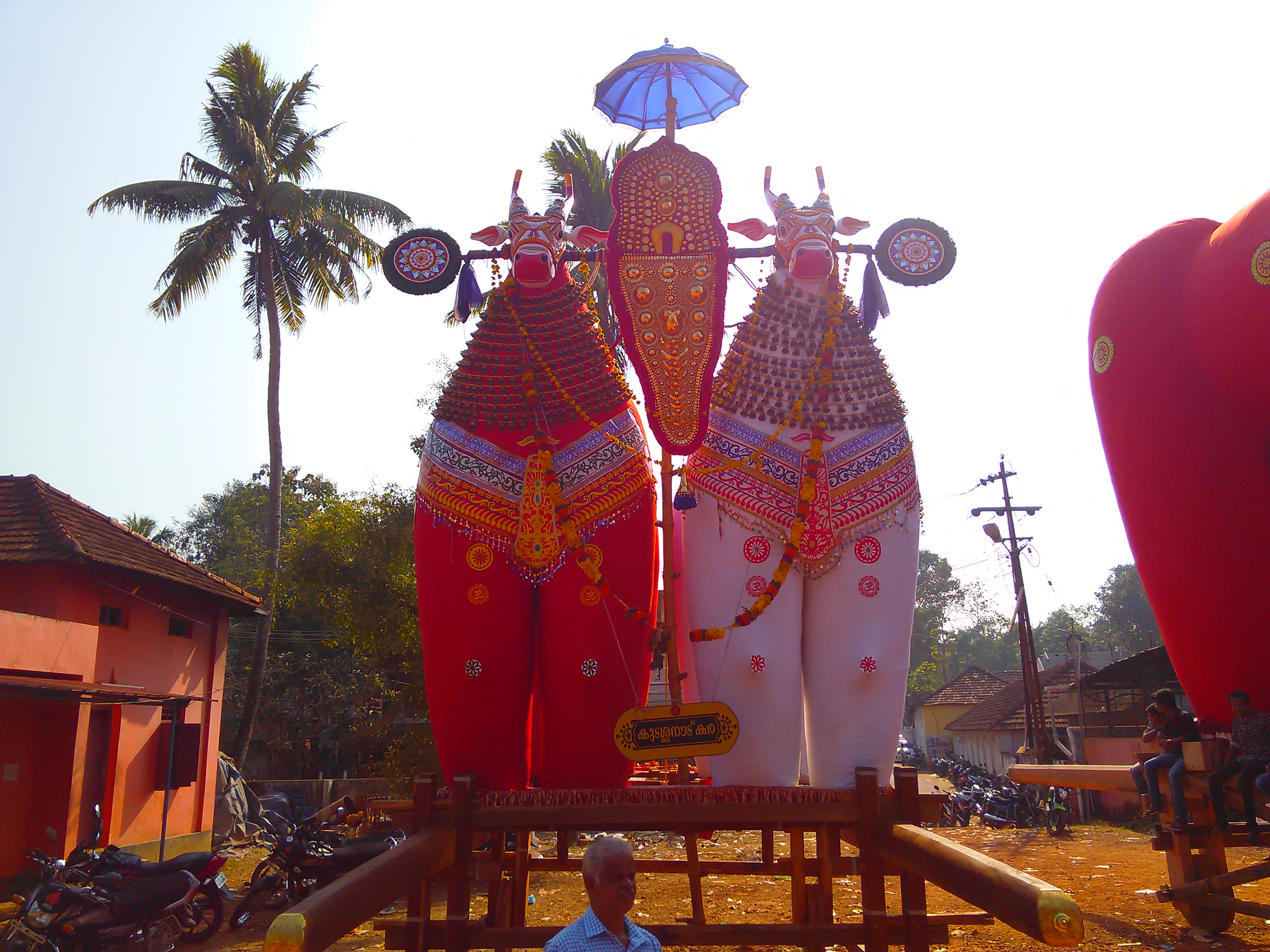
- Kudassanad
- Interactive map of Kudassanad
- Country: India
- State: Kerala
- District: Alappuzha

Population
  - Total: 5,055

Languages
  - Official: Malayalam, English
- Time zone: UTC+5:30 (IST)
- PIN: 689512
- Telephone code: 0479
- Vehicle registration: KL-31
- Coastline: 0 kilometres (0 mi)
- Nearest city: Pandalam
- Lok Sabha constituency: Mavelikara

Kudassanad is a village near Pandalam in the State of Kerala in India. Geographically it is situated in the eastern ending of Alappuzha District and western part of Pathanamthitta District. The southern end of Kudassanad is on the verge of Kollam District (in fact Kudassanad formed a part of Quilon, which was the former name of Kollam, before it was transferred to the jurisdiction of Alappuzha District). Part of Palamel Panchayat and Mavelikara Taluk, Kudassanad comes under the Mavelikara Parliamentary and Mavelikara Assembly Constituencies.
