= Perariyathavar =

- Film poster
- Directed by: Dr. Biju
- Written by: Dr. Biju
- Produced by: Anil Ambalakkara
- Starring: Suraj Venjaramoodu; Indrans
- Cinematography: M. J. Radhakrishnan
- Edited by: Karthik Jogesh
- Music by: Isaac Thomas Kottukapally
- Release dates: August 2014 (Montreal Film Festival); 9 January 2015 (India)
- Running time: 111 Minutes
- Country: India
- Language: Malayalam

Perariyathavar (English: Names Unknown) is a 2015 Indian Malayalam film directed by Dr. Biju. The film revolves around two sweepers and the problems they encounter in life, depicting the agonies of the marginalised section of society. The film stars Suraj Venjaramoodu and Indrans. It won the National Film Award for Best Film on Environment Conservation/Preservation. The film is credited as 200th film of Suraj. Suraj received the National Film Award for Best Actor for his performance.

== Synopsis ==
The story revolves around a widowed father and son working as scavengers in Kollam Municipal Corporation and the harsh life they face. They belong to a section of society which is marginalized in the mainstream. The father is working as a temporary cleaning sweeper. Chami is his friend and fellow worker who belongs to a tribal community. They collect the garbage from the city streets into a vehicle and dump it at a rural village. Sometimes father takes his son along with him. During the journey in a trash vehicle, father and son see and experience the life of many nameless, faceless marginalised people, including themselves, in the midst of huge buildings and roaring vehicles.

== Cast ==
- Suraj Venjaramoodu as the garbage collector
- Indrans as Chaami
- Master Govardhan the garbage collector's son
- Nedumudi Venu as workshop master
- Sasi Kalinga as the bandmaster
- Afzel s lebba as the garbage collector's friend
- Sona Nair
- Seema G. Nair
- Krishna Prasad

== Production ==
The film was produced by K Anilkumar under Ambalakkara Global Films. It is the second film produced by Anilkumar with Dr Biju after Akasathinte Niram (Color of Sky).

In an interview, Biju revealed that actors Dileep, Jayasurya, Biju Menon and Sreenivasan were approached to play the lead role. None of them accepted and the movie, therefore, was delayed for more than a year. Eventually, Biju chose Suraj Venjaramoodu for the role.

== Reception ==
Reviewing the film in 2015, Asha Prakash of The Times of India rated the film 3.5/5 and wrote, "The pace of the film about a garbage collector's struggles is slow, and it requires patience and reading between the lines to appreciate it in its entirety. Suraj Venjaramoodu's acting is top notch".

== Awards and nominations ==
Suraj Venjaramoodu awards and nominations
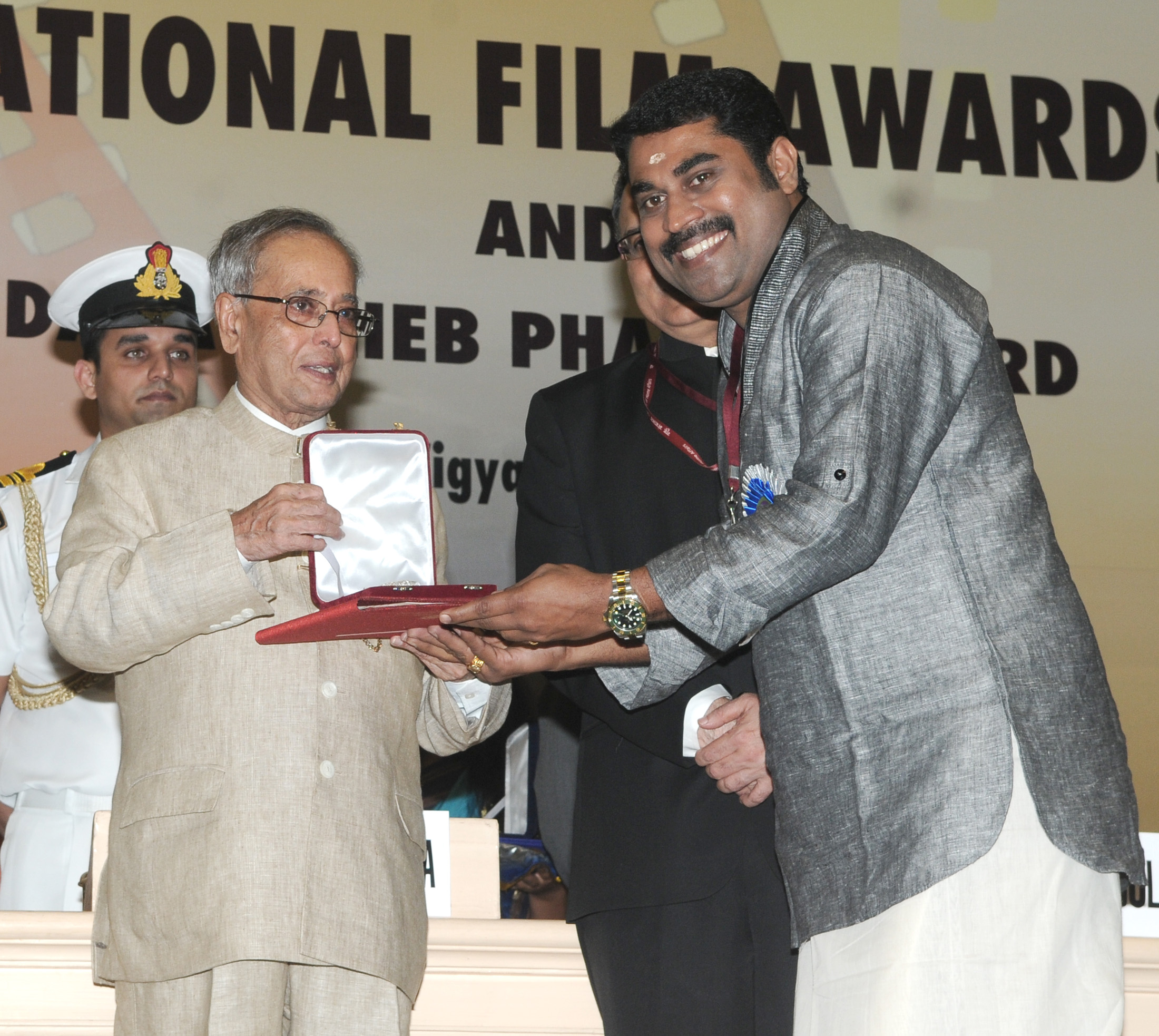
- The President, Pranab Mukherjee presenting the Rajat Kamal Award for Best Actor for this Perariyathavar Movie to Suraj Venjaramoodu, at the 61st National Film Awards function held at New Delhi on May 03, 2014
Awards and nominations
Award	Wins	Nominations

Totals (Note: Certain award groups do not simply award one winner. They acknowledge several different recipients, have runners-up, and have third place. Since this is a specific recognition and is different from losing an award, runner-up mentions are considered wins in this award tally. For simplification and to avoid errors, each award in this list has been presumed to have had a prior nomination.)
- Wins: 5
- Nominations: 5

The film was awarded Best Film on Environment Conservation/Preservation Award at the 61st National Film Awards in 2013. Suraj Venjaramoodu was awarded the Best Actor Award. The noted filmmaker and jury chairman Saeed Mirza said in a press conference, "Suraj has played a municipal sweeper [in the film] but it is an incredibly dignified performance. He excels in comedy but in this film Suraj has brilliantly played a reticent character. I would not have been able to sleep had his name not been in the list of awardees."

=== List of awards ===
Event/Year	Award	Recipient	Result
National Film Awards 2013	Best Film on Environment Conservation/Preservation Award	Dr. Biju	Won
National Film Awards 2013	Best Actor Award	Suraj Venjaramoodu	Won
Fajr International Film Festival, Iran 2015	Crystal Zymorgh for Best Actor Award	Master Govardhan	Won
Kazan International Film Festival, Russia 2015	Best Cinematography Award	M.J.Radhakrishnan	Won
Jaipur International Film Festival 2015	Best Film on Global Message	Dr.Biju	Won

=== Festivals ===
- Official selection Montreal World Film Festival, Canada, August 2014
- Official selection competition Asia Pacific Screen Awards, 2014
- Official selection/competition Mumbai Film Festival, India, October 2014
- Official selection African Diaspora International Film Festival, New York, November 2014
- Official selection Jaipur International Film Festival, India, February 2014
- Official selection Fajr International Film festival, Tehran, Iran, 2015
- Official selection Kazan International Film Festival, Russia, 2015
- Official selection, Kolkata Film Festival, 2014
- Official selection Pune Film Festival, 2014
- Official Selection International film festival of Kerala, 2014
- New Generation film festival, Stuttgart, Germany, 2014
- Edmontan film festival, Canada, 2015
