= Saira (film) =

- Directed by: Dr. Biju
- Starring: Navya Nair; Nedumudi Venu
- Release date: 2007
- Country: India
- Language: Malayalam

Saira is a 2007 Indian film starring Navya Nair and Nedumudi Venu. The film marks the directorial debut of Dr. Biju. It was the opening selection in the Tous Les Cinemas du Monde (World Cinema) section of 2007 Cannes Film Festival. It also participated in 21 other international film festivals. It was also selected at the Indian Panorama 2006.

== Premise ==
Saira is the daughter of the famous ghazal singer Ustad Ali Hussain, although she is fond of his music. Saira decides to become a news reporter but then Saira disappears. Ustad waits for Saira to return but she returns as a victim.

== Cast ==
- Navya Nair as Saira
- Nedumudi Venu as Ustad Ali Hussain
- Rajesh Sharma
- Ineya
- V.K. Baiju
- Koodal Gopan
- B.N. Radhakrishnan
- Rajiv Venad
- Somarajan Pilla
- Thaleshan
- Baby Safina
- Master Mukundan
- Master Devashambu
- Baby Shahina
- Baby Diana
- Sahadevan

== Awards ==
- 2006: Kerala State Film Award for Best Actress - Navya Nair
- 2006: Kerala State Film Award for Best Music Director - Ramesh Narayan
- 2007: Zimbabwe International Film Festival: Best Actor - Nedumudi venu
- 2006: Amrita TV Film Award for Best Actress - Navya Nair

== Film festival screening ==
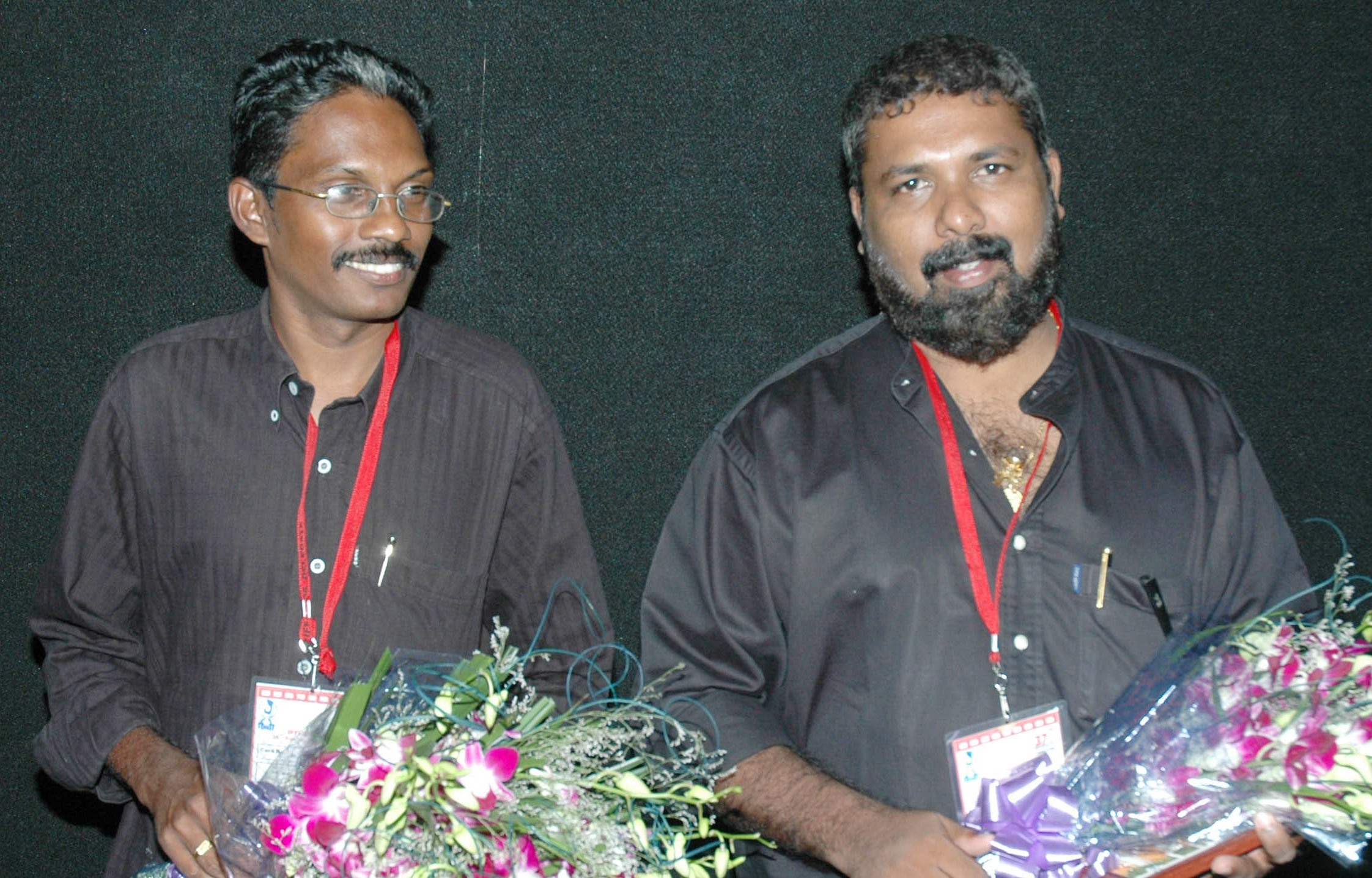
Director Dr.Biju and producer B.N.Radha Krishnan, at the presentation of the film at IFFI (2006)

- Cannes international film festival 2007/Tous les cinemas du monde
- São Paulo international film festival 2006/Official competition
- Golden Minbar international film festival Russia 2006/Official competition
- Zimbabwe international film festival 2007/Official competition
- Milan film festival, Italy 2007
- Eilat international film festival Israel 2007
- Panorama of independent filmmakers international film festival, Greece 2006
- Bangladesh international film festival 2007
- New jersey Indian film festival USA 2007
- Brussels international film festival, Belgium 2007
- International film festival of India 2006 (Indian Panorama)
- Pune International film festival (2007)
- International film festival of Kerala (2006)
- Bangalore International film festival (2007)
- Hyderabad International film festival (2007)
