= Eravu =

- village
- Location in Kerala, India Eravu (India)
- Coordinates: 10°29′0″N 76°8′0″E
- Country: India
- State: Kerala
- District: Thrissur

Government
  - Type: Panchayati raj (India)
  - Body: Arimpur Grama panchayat

Population (2011)
  - Total: 4,447

Languages
  - Official: Malayalam, English
- Time zone: UTC+5:30 (IST)
- PIN: 680620
- Vehicle registration: KL-08

Eravu is a village in Thrissur district in the state of Kerala, India. Eravu village comes under Armiboor Panchayat. St. Theresa's Ship Church is located in the village.

== Demographics ==
As of 2011 India census, Eravu had a population of 4,447 with 2,089 males and 2,358 females.
