= Kerala State Film Award for Best Processing Lab / Colourist =

Annual Indian film award

The Kerala State Film Award for Best Processing Lab / Colourist is presented annually at the Kerala State Film Awards to the best processing lab and colourist of a Malayalam film.

== Winners ==
=== 1992 – 2011 ===
No	Year	Lab	Film
1	1992	Vijaya Colour Lab	Aham
2	1993	Prasad Colour Lab	Sopanam, Sakshal Sreeman Chathunni
3	1994	Prasad Studios	Swam
4	1995	Gemini Colour Lab	Kalapani
5	1996	Gemini Colour Lab	Kaliveedu
6	1997	Prasad Colour Lab	Ennu Swantham Janakikutty
7	1998	Gemini Colour Lab	Agnisakhsi, Kannezhuthi Pottum Thottu
8	1999	Prasad Colour Lab	Vaanaprastham
9	2000	Prasad Colour Lab	Swayamvarapanthal
10	2001	Chithranjali Studio	Dany
11	2002	Prasad Colour Lab	Nizhalkuthu
12	2003	Gemini Colour Lab	Mullavalliyum Thenmavum
13	2004	Chithranjali Studio	Oridam
14	2005	Gemini Colour Lab	
15	2006	Gemini Colour Lab	
16	2007	Prasad Colour Lab	Atayalangal
17	2008	Chithranjali Studio	Bioscope
18	2009	Chithranjali Studio	Sufi Paranja Katha
19	2010	Prasad Colour Lab	
20	2011	Gemini Colour Lab	Akasathinte Niram

=== 2012 – present ===
Year	Colourist	Lab	Film
2014	Ranganathan	Prism & Pixels	Iyobinte Pusthakam, Bangalore Days
2015		Prasad Colour Lab	Charlie
2016	Henroy Messia		Kaadu Pookkunna Neram
2017		Chithranjali Studio	Bhayanakam
2018		Prime Focus, Mumbai	Carbon
2019	Liju Prabhakar	Rang Rays Media Works	Idam
2020	Liju Prabhakar		Kayattam
2021	Liju Prabhakar		Churuli
2022	Robert Lang	After Studios	Ela Veezha Poonchira
2022	R. Rangarajan	iGene - DI and VFX	Vazhakku
2023	Vaishak Shiva Ganesh	NUBE Cirrus	Aadujeevitham
2024	–	Poetic Home of Cinema	Bougainvillea; Manjummel Boys
