= Sound of Silence (2017 film) =

- Directed by: Bijukumar Damodaran
- Written by: Bijukumar Damodaran
- Produced by: Dr AK Pillai
- Starring: Master Govardhan; Uday Chandra; Bhushan
- Cinematography: M. J. Radhakrishnan
- Edited by: Davis Manuel
- Music by: Issac Thomas Kottukappilli
- Release date: 2017
- Running time: 89 minutes
- Country: India
- Languages: Tibetan; Pahari; Hindi

Sound of Silence is a 2017 Indian film in Hindi, Pahari and Tibetan. The film is directed by Malayalam film director Bijukumar Damodaran, commonly known as Dr. Biju. The film premiered at the 2017 Montreal World Film Festival. The film won an award for Best Director at the 2017 Kolkata International Film Festival in the Indian Film Competition category.

== Plot ==
Set in a Himalayan valley, this film is about the journey of a mute boy who lost his mother at birth and is neglected by his father. When his father is sent to jail, the boy faces a lonely future. The boy's connection to a Buddhist monk helps him gain strength and transcend his suffering. With nowhere to go and facing unrequited love, he joins a Buddhist monastery.

== Cast ==
- Master Govardhan as the boy
- Uday Chandra as the Monk
- Bhushan as the boy's father

== Awards ==
- Best Director at 23rd Kolkata International Film Festival India 2017, in Indian Competition Section
- Best Cinematography award at India International Film Festival Queensland, Brisbane, Australia 2017
- Best Music Director award at Aurangabad International Film Festival, India 2018, In Indian Film Competition section
- Best film at Indian Film Festival of Cincinnati in Ohio, USA in September 2018

== Festival selections ==
The film was selected for presentation at 28 festivals, including the 41st Montreal World Film Festival, the 13th Eurasia International Film Festival, Kazakhstan. Main Competition and the Imagine India International Film Festival.

- 41st Montreal World Film Festival, Canada. World Greats Section
- 13th Eurasia International Film Festival, Kazakhstan. Main Competition
- Trinidad and Tobago Film Festival. Main Competition
- Asia Pacific Screen Awards, Australia. In Competition
- 20th Religion Today Film Festival, Italy. Main Competition
- 28th Cinemagic Belfast Film festival, Northern Ireland. Main Competition
- 11th Great Lake International Film Festival, USA In Competition
- 16th Dhaka International Film Festival, Bangladesh. In Competition
- 23rd Kolkata International Film Festival, Indian Competition
- Third Eye Asian International Film Festival, India 2017
- All Lights India International Film Festival, India 2017
- 12th JOGJA NETPAC Asian Film Festival, Indonesia, Asian Perspective Section
- 6th Kolhapur International Film Festival, India 2017
- 5th Aurangabad International Film Festival, India 2017. Indian Competition Section
- India International Film Festival Queensland, Brisbane, Australia 2017
- Assam International Film Festival, India 2017
- Pune International Film Festival, India. January 2018
- Bangalore International Film Festival, India. February 2018
- Cambodia International Film Festival, March 2018
- Toulouse Indian Film Festival, Paris, France. April 2018
- This Buddhist Film Festival, Singapore. September 2018
- Habitat Film Festival, New Delhi. April 2018
- Imagine India International Film Festival, Madrid, Spain. July 2018
- BFFE- 'Buddhist Film Festival Europe', Amsterdam, September 2018. As Closing Film
- Asian Film Festival Barcelona, Spain. November 2018
- Indian Film Festival Melbourne, Australia, August 2018
- Indian Film Festival of Cincinnati, USA, Ohio., September 2018
- FFSI National Film Festival Kolkata, September 2018
- 20th Bardhaman International Film Festival, India, December 2018
- 11th International Guwahati Film Festival 2018, India, December 2018
- Buddhist International Film Festival Dikshabhumi, Nagpur, January 2019
- 4th Alpin Film Festival, Romania, 2019 February 26 and March 3
- Buddhist film festival, Nepal October 2019
