= Valiya Chirakulla Pakshikal =

Birds With Large Wings
- Directed by: Dr. Biju
- Written by: Dr. Biju
- Produced by: Dr. A.K. Pillai
- Starring: Kunchacko Boban; Nedumudi Venu; Suraj Venjaramoodu; Salim Kumar; Prakash Bare; James Bradford; Thampi Antony; Krishnan Balakrishnan; Sajeev Pillai; Krishnaprasad; Jayakrishnan; Dr. Muhammed Asheel; Anumol; Patricia Leduc; Pretti Johnson; Master Govardhan
- Cinematography: M. J. Radhakrishnan
- Edited by: Karthik Jogesh
- Music by: Santhosh Chandran
- Release date: November 2015
- Country: India
- Language: Malayalam /English /French
- Budget: ₹4 crore (US $600,000)

Valiya Chirakula Pakshikal (English: Birds with Large Wings) is a 2015 Indian Malayalam drama film written and directed by Dr. Biju and produced by Dr. A.K. Pillai. It is based on an incident in a small village in Kasaragod in the state of Kerala where thousands of people were infected with fatal diseases due to the effects of endosulfan, a pesticide used to protect cashewnut trees.

The film was shot in Kerala and Canada, and was released in India in December 2015.

== Plot ==
The film is a partly fictional representation of the environmental disaster caused by the use of the pesticide endosulfan in the Kasaragod District of Kerala, India. This disaster was caused by nearly two and a half decades of endosulfan use on government-owned cashew plantations. The film explores the disastrous environmental and public health consequences of the use of the pesticide and the health-related effects that persist to this day.

The film depicts the after-effects of pesticide spraying through the eyes of a photographer. His first visit to the area was during a rainy season in 2001, and his photographs revealed the shocking state of the numerous victims. Endosulfan-induced misery gained worldwide attention as a result of these photographs. By the time the photographer visited the area again in the summer of 2006, many of the young victims he had photographed during his earlier visit had died. Even now, children are being affected with strange and debilitating diseases.Cd In 2011, the Stockholm Summit of UN on Persistent Organic Pollutants (POP) recommended a total ban on endosulfan. India was the only country that opposed this decision. A year later, in 2012, the photographer returned to Kasaragod and found that the plight of these victims persisted, and that the survivors continued to suffer.

== Realities ==
The main character is based on Madhuraj, a Mathrubhumi press photojournalist whose 2001 exposé shed light on the environmental damage that resulted from the use of endosulfan. To maintain authenticity, and to depict events accurately, Dr. Biju consulted Madhuraj and other activists associated with the Kasaragod issue. It took nearly a year for the director to conduct this research. In a bid to give a voice to those affected by this man-made, environmental crisis, the characters that appear in the film are played by real-life victims.

Valiya Chirakulla Pakshikal's viewpoint is that a grave injustice has been perpetrated on a people by its government. It relates the story of twenty-five years of what is described as blatant disregard for the well-being of a community, and of sacrificing lives in the pursuit of greed. In spite of overwhelming evidence, the filmmaker maintains that the Indian government has not completely stopped the usage of endosulfan, nor have victims been provided access to proper treatment, or given due compensation. Although the United Nations has banned endosulfan, the decision to ban this pesticide in Kasaragod fell to the Supreme Court of India.

On his decision to take the lead role, actor Kunchacko Boban stated, "It was such a sensitive script, to which no actor could have said no. The shoot was a moving experience, and for the first time, I cried without glycerine on the sets. What we have read or seen about the ordeal of Endosulfan victims is nothing when you meet them face to face and hear them out. It was too traumatic and emotional. Never did I undergo such trauma while shooting."

== Cast ==
- Kunchacko Boban as Photographer.
- Nedumudi Venu as Chief Editor
- Suraj Venjaramoodu as Minister
- Salim Kumar as School Head Master
- James Bradford as French Environment Scientist
- Prakash Bare as Dr. Mohankumar
- Thampi Antony as Avinash
- Krishnan Balakrishnan as Villager
- Sajeev Pillai as Government Secretary of Agriculture attending Stockholm Conference
- Krishna Prasad as Reporter Venukumar
- Jayakrishnan as Father
- Dr Muhammed Asheel as Doctor attending Stockholm Conference
- Sasi Paravur as Supreme Court Justice
- M.A. Nishad as Lawyer of DYFI
- Anumol as Environment Activist attending Stockholm Conference
- Patricia Leduc as Chairperson, Stockholm Conference
- Master Govardhan as Photographers' childhood
- Sree Pedre as Sree Pedre
- Leelakumari Amma as Leelakumari Amma
- Many real-life endosulfan victims

== Production ==
The film was produced by Dr. A.K. Pillai, under the Maya Movies production house banner. Pillai is a practicing pediatrician currently living in Florida, USA. Pillai obtained postgraduate degrees from the UK and the USA, and worked for the US Government for few years before starting his own private practice. His passion for making realistic and meaningful movies led to him joining forces with contemporary artistic filmmaker Dr. Biju. The film is co-produced by Padma Pillai.

== Filming ==
The shooting schedule lasted a year in Kasaragod and Canada, in order to capture the nuances of the four seasons. The first scheduled shoot began in June 2014, in Kasaragod, to capture the monsoon. A number of children who were the actual victims of the pesticide appeared in the film at this time.

The second shoot was completed in the spring at Kasaragod, in September 2014. During the shooting, people continued to strike, demanding justice from the Government for the endosulfan victims. Protests were also recreated with major participation from the areas' mothers and children.

The third shoot was completed in Ottawa, Canada, during the winter in December 2014. CanEast films (Biju George and Satheesh Gopalan) in Ottawa, Canada, coordinated the Canadian part of shoot. The Ottawa Film Office, extended support for the production crew. Nearly 100 local actors were called upon to recreat the UN conference on persistent organic pollutants (POPs), including actor James Bradford, who played the role of a French environmental scientist. The film crew struggled to shoot most of the outdoor sequences in wintry conditions and -20 °C weather. Despite the harsh climate, shooting was wrapped in less than two weeks due to the overwhelming support from CanEast Films, the local crew and the Ottawa Film Office.

The fourth shoot took place in Kasaragod to capture the summer in February and March 2015.

== Release ==
The world premiere of the film is planned for September/October 2015 at a major film festival outside India. The Indian and Kerala release was released on 4 December 2015.

== Festivals/Awards/Nominations ==
Event/Year	Category	Result
63rd National Film Awards 2015 (India)	National Film Award for Best Film on Environment Conservation/Preservation	Won
Asia Pacific Screen Awards, Australia, November 2015	Asia Pacific Screen Awards	Official Competition
United Nations, Geneva, November 2015	United Nations Environment Programme	Special Screening
World Humanitarian event, Jakarta, September 2015	World Humanitarian Award	Won
International film festival of India, November 2015	Indian Panorama / UNESCO, Fellini Award	Nominated
Kolkata International Film Festival, India, November, 2015	Indian Cinema	Official Selection
International Film Festival of Kerala, India, November 2015	New Malayalam Cinema	Official Selection
All Lights India International Film Festival, Kerala, India, November 2015	Indian Films	Official selection
Pune International Film Festival, Pune, India, January 2016	Indian Cinema	Official selection
New York Indian Film Festival, New York, USA, May 2016	Competition	Official selection
International Film Festival of South Asia, Toronto, Canada, May 2016	Indian Cinema	Official selection
Queensland Indian International Film Festival, Brisbane, Australia 2016	Best Film	Won
Queensland Indian International Film Festival, Brisbane, Australia 2016	Best Director	Won
Queensland Indian International Film Festival, Brisbane, Australia 2016	Best Actor	Won
Queensland Indian International Film Festival, Brisbane, Australia 2016	Best Cinematography	Won
Queensland Indian International Film Festival, Brisbane, Australia 2016	Best Screenplay	Won
Hanoi International Film Festival, Vietnam 2016	International Competition	Nominated
Habitat International Film Festival, New Delhi, May 2016	Indian film	Official Selection
People and Environmental film festival, Baikal International Film Festival, Irkutsk, Russia, October 2018	International Competition	Nominated
Bridge Of Arts International Film Festival, Rostov, Russia, October 2018	Jury Films	Official selection

== Post film activities for the victims ==
After the completion of film shoot, the film crew continued their activities for supporting the Endosulfan victims. The local people and activists started a charitable organization called SNEHAM for the support of victims, with support from the crew. Actor Kunchacko Boban, along with SNEHAM volunteers, participated in the popular television program Kodeeswaran to raise money for the organization. In addition, the producer, director, and technical crew are continuing to support the cause, and aim to build a rehabilitation village to support and care for victims.
