= Aedan (film) =

Aedan: Garden of Desire
- Directed by: Sanju Surendran
- Written by: S. Hareesh, Sanju Surendran
- Story by: S. Hareesh
- Produced by: Murali Mattummal
- Starring: Abhilash Nair; George Kurian; Prasant; Nandini Sree; Sunny; Jojo George; Dileep Kumar
- Cinematography: Manesh Madhavan
- Edited by: Sreya Chatterjee
- Release date: 10 December 2017 (IFFK)
- Running time: 120 minutes
- Country: India
- Language: Malayalam

Aedan: Garden of Desire is a 2017 Indian Malayalam film directed by Sanju Surendran. The film stars Abhilash Nair, George Kurian, Prasant, Nandini Sree, Sunny, Jojo George, and Dileep Kumar. Aedan is more of a folktale in its elemental qualities and evocation of eternal human passions. Following the tradition of Indian epic narration, the structure of the film is that of a story within a story. The stories attempt a microscopic examination of human nature. As the story courses through the frustrations of the characters, the idyllic landscape of a beautiful Kerala village takes on diabolic dimensions during night time.

The film premiered at the 2017 International Film Festival of Kerala.

== Synopsis ==
The thread of the story is from the three short stories of S Hareesh - 'Niryatharayi', 'Manthrikavaalu', and 'Chappathile Kolapathakam'.

- Hari, a submissive man after meeting Peter (a retired school principal) becomes a man with wild intentions.
- Neetu a strong female figure strongly explores her sexuality with lecherous Bineesh while transporting her father's dead body, and they both are happy with it.
- Thampi, a rowdy from mistaking John Abraham (director) for Jesus Christ becomes reformed, and hearing their feared rowdy's story under intoxication, two friends feels silly and blabber mischievous stuff about each other, and one kills the other.

== Cast ==
- Abhilash Nair as Immanuel as Hari
- Nandini Sree as Jeevan Raj as Neetu
- Prasant M. Madathilkarottu as Bineesh (as Prasant)
- Spadikam Sunny alias Torappan Bastian as Maadan Tampi
- George Kurian as Peter Sir
- Jojo Cyriac George as Kaliyar Kuruvila
- Rahul Pratap as Hospital Attendant
- P.M. Yesudas as Neelakandan (as Yesudas)

== Awards ==
The film has received the following honors:

International Film Festival of Kerala

- 2017: FIPRESCI award for the best Malayalam film at the 22nd International Film Festival of Kerala, India
- 2017: Rajathachakoram award for the best debut director at the 22nd International Film Festival of Kerala, India

Kerala State Film Awards

- 2017: Second Best Film
- 2017: Best adapted screenplay
- 2017: Best Cinematography
- 2017: Best Sound Editing
