= Akasathinte Niram =

Akashathinte Niram
- Film poster
- Directed by: Dr. Biju
- Written by: Dr. Biju
- Produced by: K. Anil Kumar
- Starring: Indrajith; Nedumudi Venu; Amala Paul; Prithviraj; Anoop Chandran; Master Govardhan
- Cinematography: M. J. Radhakrishnan
- Edited by: Manoj
- Music by: Isaac Thomas Kottukapally
- Distributed by: Kalasangham Films
- Release date: June 2012 (Shanghai International Film Festival); 20 July 2012
- Running time: 117 minutes
- Country: India
- Language: Malayalam

Akashathinte Niram (English: The Colour of Sky) is a 2012 Malayalam film written and directed by Dr. Biju. The film was shot entirely on the Andaman and Nicobar Islands with a cast that includes Indrajith, Nedumudi Venu, Amala Paul and Prithviraj. The film revolves around a burglar who is trapped on a scarcely populated island and his getting to understand how nature blends with life. It premiered at the Shanghai International Film Festival in June 2012. It was subsequently screened at various film festivals where it received several honours.

== Synopsis ==
A 60-year-old man lives on a pristine, isolated island. He visits the nearby harbour in a motorboat once a month to sell handicrafts. A young burglar keeps tabs on him and one day jumps onto the motorboat and demands money. The old man remains calm and takes the motorboat towards his island where the young man remains trapped. He meets the people who live with the old man, a 7-year-old boy, a 20-year-old deaf and mute lady and a middle-aged man with a stammer. The intruder confronts rare life situations for the first time. His concept about life changes as he understands how nature blends with life.

== Cast ==
- Indrajith as the Young man
- Nedumudi Venu as the Old man
- Amala Paul as the Young Lady
- Prithviraj as Doctor
- Anoop Chandran as Helper
- Master Govardhan as Boy
- Indrans as Helper
- V. K. Sreeraman as Writer
- Geetha Salaam as Worker
- C. J. Kuttappan as Singer
- Biju John as Painter
- Shaji Sharma as the Man on wheelchair

== Production ==
The film was produced by K. Anil Kumar under the banner of Ambalakkara Global Films. Isaac Thomas Kottukappally composed the background score while the songs are composed by Ravindra Jain and sung by K. J. Yesudas and others. M. J. Radhakrishnan, who had cranked camera for Dr. Biju's earlier films, Location sync sound and sound design is by Jayadevan Chakkadath while Pramod Thomas handles the sound mixing. Bindu Sajan was assistant director. The film's production design was by Santosh Raman.

The film was entirely shot on a tiny island Neil, located 40 kilometers to the south of the Andaman and Nicobar Islands in the Bay of Bengal. A wooden shore house was set for the film.

== Release ==
The world premiere of the film was at the Shanghai International Film Festival on 19 June 2012. The film was an official selection in the International Competition section for the prestigious Golden Goblet award. This was the first Malayalam film compete for the Golden Goblet award at Shanghai. The film released in theatres in India on 20 July 2012. It was also released in the US in the first week of November.

=== Festival screenings ===
The film was an official selection for the following film festivals:

- June 2012: 15th Shanghai International Film Festival (China) - International Competition section.
- September 2012: 8th Eurasia International Film Festival (Almaty, Kazakhstan) - International Competition section.
- October 2012: 48th Chicago International Film Festival (USA)
- October 2012: South Asian Film Festival (Vancouver, Canada)
- November 2012: Tallinn Black Nights Film Festival (Estonia)
- November 2012: 43rd International Film Festival of India (India) - Indian Panorama section.
- November 2012: 18th Kolkata International Film Festival (India)
- December 2012: Bangalore International Film Festival - Asian competition section
- December 2012: 17th International Film Festival of Kerala (India)
- January 2013: 11th Pune International Film Festival (India)
- February 2013: 31st Fajr International Film Festival (Iran) - International Competition section.
- April 2013: 14th Jeonju International Film Festival (South Korea) - Incredible India section.
- May 2013: 12th Imagine India Film Festival (Madrid, Spain) - Competition section.
- May 2013: 13th New York Indian Film Festival (USA).
- July 2013: 10th Stuttgart Indian Film Festival (Germany).
- September 2013: 4th Jagran film festival (India) - Official competition
- October 2013: 8th Seattle South Asian Film Festival (USA).

== Reception ==
=== Critical response ===
Paresh C. Palicha of Rediff.com gave the film a 3/5 rating. The reviewer said, "This somewhat meditative treatment runs the risk of distancing the viewer. One can see the influence of the Japanese master Akira Kurosawa's Dreams and South Korean director Kim Ki Duk's Spring, Summer, Fall, Winter... and Spring here. One can also see that leaving the characters nameless is becoming Dr Biju's stamp: every character was nameless in his previous film Veettilekkulla Vazhi. In the end, we can say that this visually grand film is meditative in nature and silently attractive."

C. Sujit Chandra Kumar of Deccan Chronicle gave the film four stars in a scale of five.

Metromatinee.com also published a positive write-up which reads: "If you miss this, you will miss a good color of Malayalam film."

However, Aswin Kumar of The Times of India wrote an average review and gave a 2/5 rating and said, "The sequences, in spite of their moving visuals, seldom linger in the viewer's mind. They don't leave anything behind."

=== Awards ===
The film has received the following honours:

New York Indian Film Festival

- 2013: Best Screenplay - Dr. Biju

Imagine India Film Festival

- 2013: Best Music - Issac Thomas Kottukappally

Kerala State Film Awards

- 2011: Kerala State Film Award for Special Jury Award - Dr. Biju
- 2011: Kerala State Film Award for Best Cinematography
- 2011: Kerala State Film Award for Best Processing Lab
