= Kaadu Pookkunna Neram =

- Official poster
- Directed by: Dr. Biju
- Written by: Dr. Biju
- Produced by: Sophia Paul
- Starring: Indrajith Sukumaran; Rima Kallingal; Prakash Bare; Indrans; Irshad; Krishnan Balakrishnan; Gopan karunagapally Jayachandran kadambanad
- Cinematography: M. J. Radhakrishnan
- Music by: Santhosh Chandran
- Production company: Weekend Blockbusters
- Release dates: September 2016 (Montreal Film Festival); 25 November 2016
- Country: India
- Language: Malayalam

Kaadu Pookkunna Neram (English: When the Forest Bloom) is a 2016 Indian Malayalam film written and directed by Dr. Biju. The film is produced by Sophia Paul under the film production house, Weekend Blockbusters. It stars Indrajith Sukumaran as a policeman, who is sent into deep jungles to capture the chief of a radical organization, played by Rima Kallingal, but instead finds himself trapped in it.

Kaadu Pookkunna Neram premiered at the Montreal World Film Festival in September 2016.

== Cast ==
- Indrajith Sukumaran
- Rima Kallingal
- Prakash Bare
- Indrans as School Master
- Irshad
- Krishnan Balakrishnan
- Gopan Karunagapally
- Jayachandran Kadambanad

== Release ==
Kaadu Pookkunna Neram premiered at the Montreal World Film Festival in September 2016. ON 8 September 2016, it was announced as the only Indian film to be screened at Eurasia Film Festival.

== Awards ==
- Winner Special Jury Award at Bangalore International Film Festival, India, February 2017

National Film Awards 2016 -

- Best Sound Designer : Jayadevan Chakkadeth

Kerala State Film Awards 2016 -

- Best Cinematography : MJ Radhakrishnan
- Best Location sync Sound recordist : Jayadevan Chakkadeth
- Best Sound Mixing : Pramod Thomas
- Best Sound Designer : Jayadevan Chakkadeth
- Best Colourist : Vista VFX Lab

== Festivals ==
- Official selection. Montreal International film festival, Canada. September 2016.
- Official Selection. Main Competition section of Eurasia Film festival, Almaty, Kazakhstan. September 2016
- Official Selection. Competition section of Asia Pacific screen awards, Australia. November 2016
- Official selection, International competition section, International film festival, Kerala, December 2016
- Official selection, International competition, Arica Nativa film festival, Chile, November 2016
- Official selection, International competition, Jogja NETPAC Film festival, Indonesia, December 2016
- Official selection, Indian Panorama, International film festival of India, November 2016
- Official selection, Indian International film festival of Queensland, Australia 2017.
- Official selection, New York Indian Film Festival, USA, April 2017.
- Official selection, Indian Competition, Bangalore International Film Festival, India, February 2017.
- Official selection, ImagineIndia International film festival Madrid, Spain, April 2017.
- Official selection, Roundglass International Environmental Film Festival Bangalore, October 2017.
- Official selection, Edmonton International Film Festival, Canada, July 2017.
- Bhubaneswar Film Festival, India, February 2018
- Bangalore International Centre Film Festival, India, January 2018
