= Anumol =

Indian actress

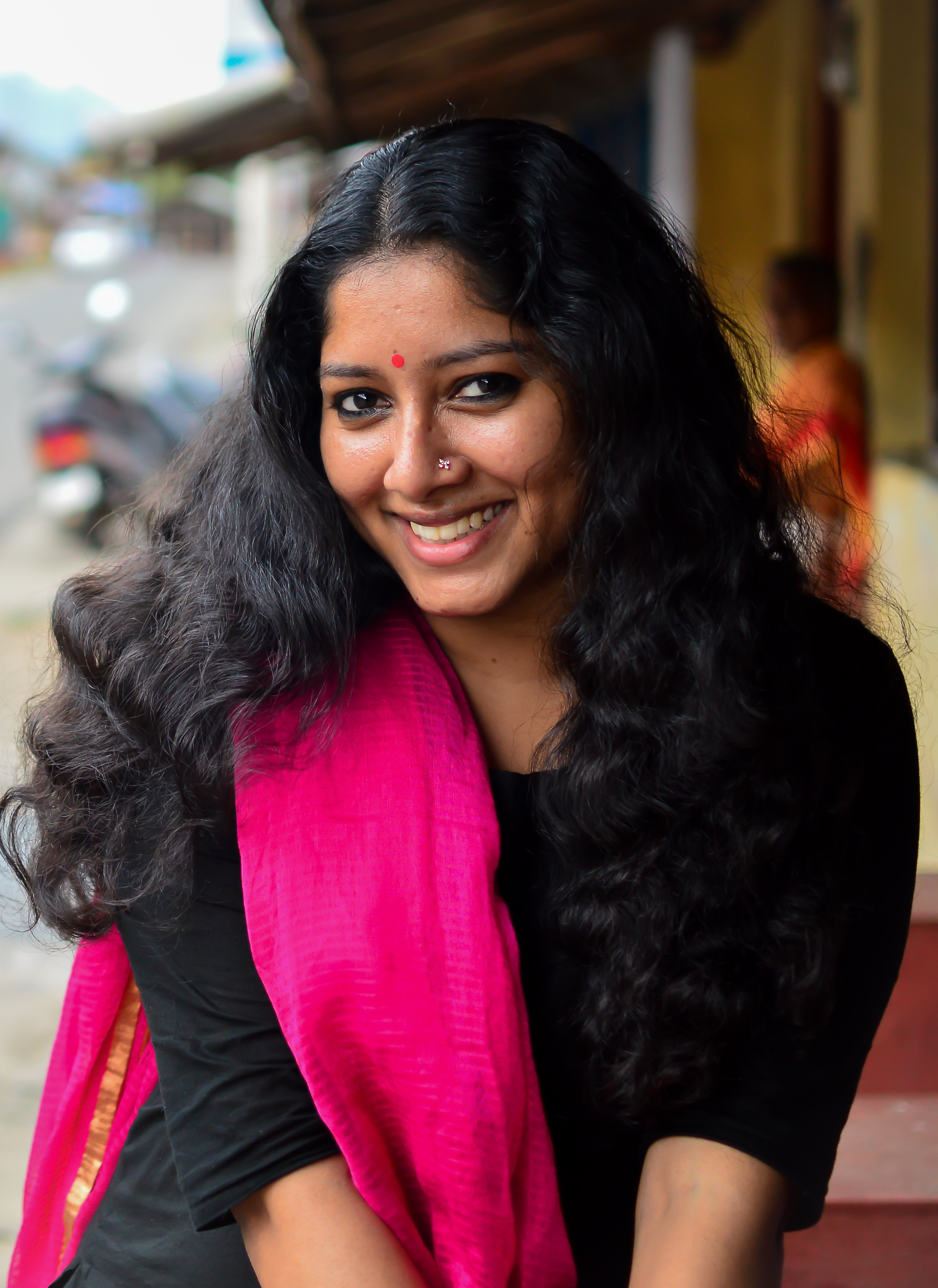
- Born: Naduvattam, Pattambi, Kerala, India
- Occupations: Actress; Bharathanatiyam dancer
- Years active: 2010–present

Anumol is an Indian actress, predominantly acting in Malayalam and Tamil films. She appeared in Malayalam films such as Chayilyam (2014), Ivan Megharoopan (2012), Akam (2011), Vedivazhipadu (2013) and Jamna Pyari (2015). Her performance as Kuruvammal in 2023 Tamil web-series Ayali applauded by Critics and Audience.

== Film career ==
Starting her film career with the Tamil films Kannukkulle, Ramar and Sooran, Anumol forayed into Malayalam cinema with P. Balachandran's Ivan Megharoopan, a biopic based on the poet P. Kunhiraman Nair. She portrayed Thankamony.

She was also in the film Akam, an adaptation of Malayattoor Ramakrishnan's novel Yakshi.

Debutant director Manoj Kana's Chayilyam was about the plight of a hapless widow who is denied the freedom to lead a normal life by society. In the film, Anumol player the character Gauri, who had eloped with her lover and then returned with her son into her in-laws' home, after the death of her husband. Her father-in-law had brought them back, but orthodox society was against this. The resistance ends when the people around start visualizing her as the incarnation of a Goddess. The story is narrated with the traditional folk art form Theyyam as the backdrop. Gauri wants to lead the rest of her life as a mother and as a woman, but the image of a Goddess is thrust upon her. The whole film is focused on the character played by Anumol and the actor has delivered a matured performance. The dedication of the actor is there to be seen in most frames.

Anumol has filmed Njan, a film by Ranjith.

In Rockstar, directed by V. K. Prakash, the motorcycle enthusiast and rider, Anumol played a tomboy character riding a 500 cc Royal Enfield bullet motorcycle at 130 km/h for the role of Sanjana Kurien, a fashion photographer.

In the film Nilaavariyaathe, a film about caste discrimination and barriers that existed in Kerala a century ago, set in the backdrop of Kasaragod District in North Malabar region of Kerala, Anumol was portrayed as Paatta, the heroine, who is an advocate against casteism and untouchability.

In the film Premasuthram, directed by Jiju Ashokan, Anumol plays a character called Manju Rani, a tailor in the film. It is the first time Anumol is handling an out-and-out peppy character. Again marked by a brilliant portrayal, Anumol's character runs a local tailoring shop in a rural pocket in the film.

In the biopic film Padmini, which portrays the life of a genius female painter T. K. Padmini from Kerala, Anumol takes the lead to portray Padmini. The biopic goes through the struggle she faced throughout her life to achieve her path. The film portrays the struggles Padmini had to face as art was prohibited for women from good families at that time. It discusses the obstacles she had to overcome in order to get an education and to indulge in art. T. K. Padmini was one of the rarest from her category, as there are only a few women painters from Kerala. Anumol's exceptionally brilliant and ingenious portrayal by living the character herself is the mark of this film.

== Performing arts career ==
Anumol is a well known Kathakali and Bharathnatyam dancer. Speaking on how she developed a passion for acting, Anumol says that it was ballet that attracted her to the world of glitz and glam.

== Filmography ==
Year	Title	Role	Language	Notes
2010	Kannukulle	Bharathi	Tamil	Debut film
2010	Raamar	Magalakshmi	Tamil	
2010	Magizhchi	Sasi	Tamil	
2012	Ivan Megharoopan	Thankamony	Malayalam	
2013	David & Goliath	Deepa	Malayalam	
2013	Akam	Ragini	Malayalam	
2013	God for Sale	Anupama	Malayalam	
2013	Vedivazhipadu	Sumithra	Malayalam	
2014	Chayilyam	Gauri	Malayalam	
2014	Parayan Baaki Vechathu	Alice	Malayalam	
2014	Sooran	Yamuna	Tamil	credited as Anu
2014	Njaan	Janu	Malayalam	
2014	Maram Peyyumbol	Maya Shanker	Malayalam	
2015	Thilagar	Myna	Tamil	
2015	Jamna Pyari	Veena	Malayalam	
2015	Oru Naal Iravil	Thangam	Tamil	
2015	Birds With Large Wings	Environment Activist	Malayalam	
2015	Rockstar	Sanjana Kurien	Malayalam	
2016	Amoeba	Maneesha	Malayalam	
2016	Kuttikalundu Sookshikkuka	Merin Mathew	Malayalam	
2017	Nilavariyathe	Paatta	Malayalam	
2018	Premasoothram	Manjurani	Malayalam	
2019	Pattabhiraman	Fida Fathima	Malayalam	
2019	Sullu	Shobha	Malayalam	
2019	Udalaazham	Dance Teacher	Malayalam	
2020	Paapam Cheyyathavar Kalleriyatte	Lissy	Malayalam	
2020	Padmini	Padmini	Malayalam	
2022	Two Men	Anitha	Malayalam	
2022	The Teacher	Geetha	Malayalam	
2022	Viral Sebi	Vijayalakshmi	Malayalam	
2023	Farhana	Nithya	Tamil	
2023	Pendulum	Angel	Malayalam	
2024	Aaro	Malathi	Malayalam	
2024	CID Ramachandran Retd. SI	Urmila	Malayalam	
2024	Haraa	Nila	Tamil	
2024	Oru Anweshanathinte Thudakkam	Aani Alex	Malayalam	
2025	Kaayal	Yamuna	Tamil	
2026	Lurk †	TBA	Malayalam	

== Television ==
- 8pm (Kairali we TV)
- Vanitha Ratnam (Amrita TV)
- Red Carpet (Amrita TV)
- Bzinga (Zee Keralam)

== Web-series ==
Web-series
Year	series	Role	Notes	Language	Platform
2023	Ayali	Kuruvamma		Tamil	ZEE5
2024	Manorathangal	Venugopal's mother	Anthology Series Segment: Kadugannawa Oru Yatra Kurippu	Malayalam	ZEE5
2024–present	Heart Beat	Dr.Radhi Thiagarajan		Tamil	Hotstar Originals

== Online ==
- Anuyathra: Anuyathra is a popular vlog by Anumol.
