= Yakshini (disambiguation) =

Yakshinis or Yakshis are a class of female nature spirits in Hindu, Buddhist, and Jain religious mythologies.

Yakshini or Yakshi may also refer to:

- Yakshini (TV series), an Indian Telugu-language fantasy romantic thriller television series
- Yakshi (film), a 1968 Malayalam-language psychological thriller film
- Yakshi (novel), a 1967 Malayalam novel by Malayattoor Ramakrishnan
- Yakshi (sculpture), a sculpture by Kanayi Kunhiraman
