= Pareeth Pandari =

- Directed by: Gafoor Y. Elliyaas
- Written by: Gafoor Y. Elliyaas
- Produced by: Shybin T.
- Starring: Kalabhavan Shajohn; Ansiba Hassan; Sajitha Madathil; Anil Murali; Sreenath Bhasi
- Cinematography: Faizal V Khalid
- Edited by: Ratheesh Mohan
- Music by: James Vasanthan
- Release date: 17 March 2017
- Country: India
- Language: Malayalam

Pareeth Pandari is a 2017 Indian Malayalam-language drama film written and directed by Gafoor Y. Elliyaas, and starring Kalabhavan Shajohn in the lead role. This film was produced by Shybin T. under the banner of Chennai Film Factory. Pareeth Pandari is the first film of Kalabhavan Shajohn in a leading role.

== Cast ==
- Kalabhavan Shajohn as Pareeth
- Ansiba Hassan as Faseela
- Sajitha Madathil as Hawwa
- Anil as Pothali
- Jayaraj Warrier as Abu
- Jaseena Zackriya as
- Joy Mathew as Jamal
- Tini Tom as Basheer
- Jaffar Idukki as Dawoo
- Sunil Sukhada as Krishnan
- Sathaar
- Sreeni Njarackal
- Pauly Valsan as Akkaamma
- Sudarshan Alappuzha
- Santha Kumari
