= Shutter (2014 film) =

- Film poster
- Directed by: V. K. Prakash
- Screenplay by: Manisha Korde
- Story by: Joy Mathew
- Produced by: Sajeev MP; Prakash Bare
- Starring: Sachin Khedekar; Sonalee Kulkarni; Amey Wagh
- Cinematography: Manoj Kumar Khatoi
- Music by: Ousepphachan
- Production companies: Silicon Media; Trendz Ad Film
- Distributed by: STV Networks
- Release date: 3 July 2014
- Running time: 123 minutes
- Country: India
- Language: Marathi

Shutter is a 2014 Marathi language thriller film that was directed by V. K. Prakash and is a re-make of the Malayalam 2012 film of the same name. The film had its world premiere on 17 September 2014 and will have a theatrical release on 3 July 2015. It stars Sachin Khedekar as a man that has recently returned from overseas, only to go through a series of unexpected situations.

Filming for Shutter was completed in March 2014. Prakash chose to alter some portions of the story from the original film, stating "It’s an adaptation. I have concentrated on the content and not the ‘setting’ of the story." The trailer for the movie was launched on 24 June 2015.

== Synopsis ==
Jitya Bhau (Sachin Khedekar) is a middle-class family man who has returned to his home in Maharashtra, as he is on a vacation from his overseas job. Due to a series of misadventures he ends up getting trapped with a nameless hooker (Sonalee Kulkarni) in a small shop room and must wait for one of his friends to release him. However the longer the two are trapped together the more the two end up learning about one another.

== Cast ==
- Prakash Bare as Struggling film director
- Sachin Khedekar as Jitya Bhau
- Sonalee Kulkarni as Hooker
- Amey Wagh as Innocent auto rickshaw driver
- Kaumudi Walokar as Daughter of Jitya Bhau
- Jaywant Wadkar
- Radhika Harshe
- Kaumudi Walokar
- Kamlesh Sawant
- Anirudh Hariip
