= Akam (film) =

- Theatrical Release Poster
- Directed by: Shalini Usha Nair
- Screenplay by: Shalini Usha Nair
- Based on: Yakshi by Malayattoor Ramakrishnan
- Produced by: Box Office Cinema
- Starring: Fahadh Faasil; Anumol
- Cinematography: Christopher John Smith
- Edited by: Arunima Shankar
- Music by: Deepak Raghu; Murari Vasudevan
- Production company: Box Office Cinema
- Release dates: December 2011 (DIFF); 26 April 2013 (India)
- Country: India
- Language: Malayalam

Akam (English: Inside) is an Indian Malayalam language thriller drama film written and directed by Shalini Usha Nair (in her directorial debut). The film is a contemporary retelling of Malayattoor Ramakrishnan's classic psycho-thriller novel Yakshi (1967). The story is about Srini (Fahadh Faasil), a young architect, who starts suspecting that his beautiful wife Ragini (Anumol) is a yakshi.

The film was shot in and around Trivandrum and its surrounding suburbs. It premiered at the 8th Dubai International Film Festival in December 2011. It was also screened at the Shanghai International Film Festival and International Film Festival of Kerala. The film released in theatres on 26 April 2013.

== Plot ==
Srinivasan is a young architect. He is happy when he gets a good job and a beautiful girlfriend, Tara. But then an accident disfigures him. Tara leaves him and Srinivasan, now sans his confidence, withdraws into his shell. Then he meets the beautiful Ragini who is willing to accept him despite his disfigurement. They get married, but after a while, he doubts the true identity of this woman. He doubts that this woman is not human. From there the story develops.

== Cast ==
- Fahadh Faasil as Srini
- Anumol as Ragini
- Prakash Bare
- Shelly Kishore
- Sajitha Madathil

== Critical reception ==
Veeyen from Nowrunning.com says: "Somber and extremely suspenseful, the illusory texture of its narrative turns out to be of a class of its own."

== Film festival screenings ==
The film was screened at the following festivals:

- December 2011: Dubai International Film Festival
- December 2011: International Film Festival of Kerala
- June 2012: Shanghai International Film Festival (World Panorama section)

== See also ==
- Yakshi, a 1968 film adaptation of the novel
