= Mohavalayam =

Indian film

- Directed by: T. V. Chandran
- Written by: T. V. Chandran
- Produced by: Anchal Sreenath; Biju Kadaikkal
- Starring: Mythili; Joy Mathew
- Cinematography: M. J. Radhakrishnan
- Edited by: Yadavan Chandran
- Music by: Sandeep Pillai; M. Jayachandran
- Production company: Causeway Productions
- Release date: 18 March 2016
- Country: India
- Language: Malayalam

Mohavalayam is a 2016 Malayalam–language Indian film written and directed by T. V. Chandran. The film portrays the lives of Malayali expatriates in the Kingdom of Bahrain. It was the first Indian film to be shot entirely in Bahrain. The film stars Mythili and Joy Mathew in the lead roles. It has music composed by M. Jayachandran.

== Cast ==
- Mythili as Prameela
- Joy Mathew as Jose Sebastian
- Shine Tom Chacko
- Renji Panicker
- Siddique as Basheer
- Ishwak Singh
- Srindaa as Mehru
- Sudheesh
- Indrans
- Santhosh Keezhattoor
- Maala Parvathi as Elizabeth
- Sajitha Madathil

== Awards ==
- Kerala State Film Award – Special Mention - Joy Mathew
