= Prakash Bare =

Indian theater and film actor

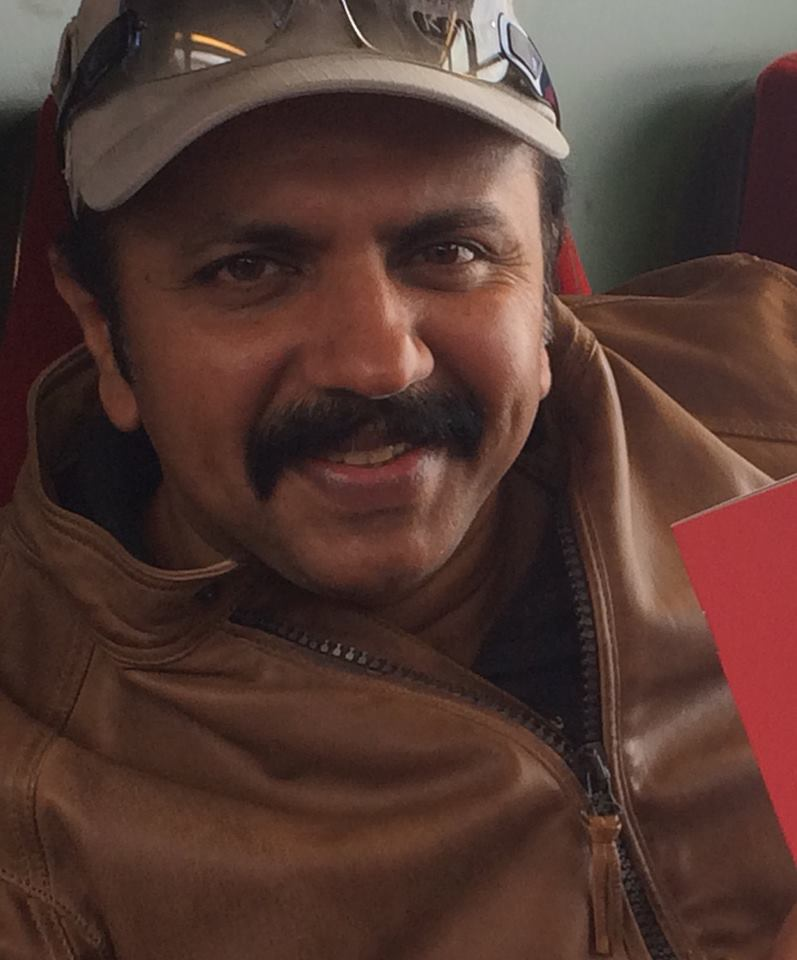
- Bare in April 2015
- Born: Kasaragod, India
- Occupations: Actor; producer; technologist
- Organizations: IndVentr; ShareYourFortune; Simelabs
- Title: Co-founder of Sinergia Media Labs aka Simelabs
- Spouse: Latha Rao
- Children: 2

Prakash Bare is an Indian theater and film actor focusing on Malayalam, English and other south Indian language productions. Starting with the 2010 Malayalam film Sufi Paranja Katha, Prakash has acted in more than 30 films directed by some of the most eminent filmmakers. He is now a live presence in south Indian art house movies and theater scene. Prakash is also a technologist and entrepreneur focusing on VLSI, Software, media production etc. As a social activist, Prakash is involved in the Endosulfan struggle of Kasaragod and is the president of CERV Collectives which secured interim compensation of ₹ 5 lakhs for 6000 plus affected patients through a legal campaign.

== Early life ==
Prakash grew up in Chirakkal, a small village in Kannur district and attended Kamala Nehru UP School, Govt Model High School, Valapattanam and S. N. College, Kannur for Pre University Degree. He completed B.Tech in Electrical Engineering from NSS College of Engineering, Palakkad, Kerala. Prakash was active in dramatics during the college days and has won many accolades including Best Actor awards in Calicut University Interzone arts festival. He later did a masters in Microelectronics from IIT Kanpur, and spent 15 years in Silicon Valley, California where he worked as a technologist and entrepreneur in the micro chip design and automation industry.

== Tech career ==
Prakash has held various technology and business positions in electronics design industry in the US and India. He was a co-founder of GDA Technologies Inc, one of the pioneering Electronic Design Services(EDS) companies. GDA, listed as one of the fastest-growing privately held companies in US by Inc Magazine its annual INC500 list in 2002, was subsequently acquired by Rambus Inc and L&T Technology Services in March 2007. He is currently the Co-founder & Chief Gardener of Sinergia Media Labs, based in Smartcity Kochi which is into digital transformation services solutions provider.

== Acting career ==
Prakash is best known for his depiction of poet KP Madhavan Nair in Ivan Megharoopan inspired by the life and works of the renowned Malayalam poet P. Kunhiraman Nair (popularly known as Mahakavi P). A critic noted, "Prakash Bare is the surprise package. He is flexible enough to play a deviant character with whom we can still empathise".

A noted performance of Prakash is in film Oraalppokkam, produced by Kazhcha Chalachithra Vedi through online crowdfunding and shot in Kedarnath and Uttarakhand areas. The Hollywood Reporter observed that "playing the uncommitted philosophy teacher forced to question his very existence, Prakash creates an anxious, self-deceiving but always believable hero". Paresh Palicha in his review in Rediff.com observes: "It is Prakash Bare as an actor who shoulders the responsibility of communicating the director's vision to the viewer and he does it with utmost sincerity. We can see the turmoil he is going through in the entire film."

Diverse roles like Maamootty in Sufi Paranja Katha, Filmmaker in Shutter(Marathi), Itthar trader Azad in Oru Indian Pranayakatha, IT tycoon Mahesh Moorthy in Ivide, Sub Inspector in Kaadu Pookkunna Neram, Dr Mohankumar in Valiya Chirakulla Pakshikal, Thahasildar Sunil Das in Jalam, Swami Haripanchanana Baba in Prabhuvinte Makkal are some of the other most noted performances of Prakash. The investigation officer DIG Balagopal Narayan in Satheesh Paul's Kaattu Vithachavar and the filmmaker in Dr. Biju's new English film Painting Life are Prakash's upcoming lead roles.

== Production activities ==
Under the banner Silicon Media, Prakash has produced/co-produced Sufi Paranja Katha, Janaki, Ivan Megharoopan, Shutter(Marathi), and Papilio Buddha. Thampi Antony has been a co-producer for the first four productions of Silicon Media and Gopa Periyadan a collaborator on Ivan Megharoopan. Their productions have won several recognitions including 15 state film awards and official selections to reputed film festivals like Berlin, Montreal, BFI, Durban, Kerala, Mumbai, Kolkata, Trinidad-Tobago etc.

Prakash has tried to experiment with his productions by staying away from formulas and conventions His focus areas include content creation and delivery on internet and the newer technology trends in that domain. Prakash has also been part of multiple crowd funded films as an actor as well as collaborator. Teaming up with MP Sajeev and VKP, he produced Shutter in Marathi language (2015). In 2016, he co-produced a sitcom Brown Nation, based on the lives of Indian community living in NJ area, which is well received on Netflix. Dr. Biju's English film Painting Life is Silicon Media's upcoming production.

== Theater ==
Prakash formed BlueOcean Theater group along with friends and colleagues including Jayaprakash Kulur, VKP, Padmapriya, Manojkumar Narayanan, musician Sunilkumar et al.

BlueOcean theater productions includes plays based on the works of Samuel Beckett, Anton Chekhov, Neil Simon, Jayaprakash Kulur and NN Pillai. Becket's Waiting for Godot was presented in Malayalam as "Godoye Kaathu" (based on Kadammanitta's translation), directed by theater veteran KA Nandajan in which Prakash played the role of Vladimir. 4Play, based on the works of Anton Chekhov and Jayaprakash Kulur was staged in 2012 with a cast of Prakash, Padmapriya, Manojkumar Narayanan, VKP, Ann Augustine, and Vandana Prabhu.

In 2017, BlueOcean collaborated with NECAB and Performance Studies Collective, Delhi to produce The Cabinet of Dr. Caligari - play directed by Deepan Sivaraman based on the classic German expressionist silent film of 1920. Prakash enacts in this play the title role of Dr Caligari.

== Filmography ==
=== As actor ===
Year	Title	Character	Director
2010	Sufi Paranja Katha	Maamootti	Priyanandanan
2011	Janaki	Ayaal	MG Sasi
2011	Akam	Architect CK	Shalini Usha Nair
2012	Ivan Megharoopan	Poet KP Madhavan Nair	P. Balachandran
2012	Friday	Arun	Lijin Jose
2012	Arike	Vinayan	Shyamaprasad
2012	Prabhuvinte Makkal	Haripanchanan Baba	Sajeevan Anthikad
2012	Ithra Mathram	Guest appearance	K. Gopinathan
2013	Papilio Buddha	Police officer	Jayan K. Cherian
2013	Silence	Guest appearance	V. K. Prakash
2013	Oru Indian Pranayakadha	Azad	Sathyan Anthikad
2014	Oraalppokkam	Mahendran	Sanal Kumar Sasidharan
2014	Mazhaneerthullikal	Editor	V. K. Prakash
2014	Nayana	Jayan	KN Sasidharan
2014	Kukkilyar	Raman Nair	Nemom Pushparaj
2014	Shutter (Marathi)	Struggling film director Govind	V. K. Prakash
2014	Brown Nation (TV Sitcom)	Guru (Godman)	Aby Varghese
2015	Balyakalasakhi	Suhara's father	Pramod Payyannur
2015	Jalam	Sunil Das	Padmakumar
2015	Rangolu (Kannada)	Film Director	AV Jayaraj
2015	Ivide	Mahesh Murthy	Shyamaprasad
2015	Birds With Large Wings	Dr. Mohankumar	Dr. Biju
2015	Rockstar	Narendran	V. K. Prakash
2016	Kaadu Pookkunna Neram	Sub Inspector	Dr. Biju
2016	Tiyaan	Corporate head	Jeeyen Krishnakumar
2017	Kaviyude Osyath	Kavi	Vineeth Anil
2017	Kaattu Vithachavar	DIG Balagopal	Satish Paul
2017	Mammali Enna Indiakkaran	Gafoor Haji	Arun N. Sivan
2017	Shukra Dase (Kannada)	Udyami	Joseph Neenasam
2017	Painting Life	Filmmaker	Dr. Biju
2017	Udampadi	Ayyappan	Suresh peter
2018	Madhuram ee jeevitham	Samuel	Fr. Anil Philip
2018	Veyilmarangal	Collector	Dr. Biju
2020	Orange Marangalude Veedu	Davis	Dr. Biju
2020	Etham	Artist Bose	Praveen Moodadi
2021	Portraits	Investigation officer	Dr. Biju
2021	Pendulum	John Master	Rejin Babu
2022	Half Pants Full Pants	Sampath	V. K. Prakash
2022	Cheers	Chairman	Sudevan
2023	Pendulum	John Master	Rejin S. Babu
2025	Papa Buka	Anand Kunhiraman	Dr Biju

=== As producer ===
Year	Title	Director	Language	Notes
2010	Sufi Paranja Katha	Priyanandanan	Malayalam	4 Kerala state awards, IFFK
2011	Janaki	MG Sasi	Malayalam	Kerala state award for Best child artiste, IFFK
2012	Ivan Megharoopan	P. Balachandran	Malayalam	4 Kerala state awards including second best film, John Abraham Sp Jury Award
2013	Papilio Buddha	Jayan K Cherian	Malayalam	Berlinale, Montreal, BFI, Durban, Oxaca, 2 Kerala state awards..
2014	Shutter (Marathi)	V. K. Prakash	Marathi	Best regional film in JIFF, DD Sahyadri award for editing, Sanskruti Kaladarpan Award for Sachin
2014	Brown Nation (TV Sitcom)	Aby Varghese	English	Released on Netflix
2017	Painting Life	Dr. Biju	English	World premiere in Montreal World film festival
2019	Udampadi	Suresh Peter	Malayalam	
2021	House of Orange Trees	Dr. Biju	Malayalam	
2025	Papa Buka	Dr. Biju	Tok Pisin, English, Hindi	The Papua New Guinea-India co-production.
