= Idolle Ramayana =

- Theatrical release poster of the Kannada version
- Directed by: Prakash Raj
- Screenplay by: Prakash Raj
- Story by: Joy Mathew
- Based on: Shutter (Malayalam)
- Produced by: Prakash Raj; Ramjee Narasiman
- Starring: Prakash Raj; Priyamani; Achyuth Kumar; Aravind Kuplika; Rangayana Raghu; Raghubabu; Prudhviraj; Aravind Kuplikar; Satyadev
- Cinematography: Mukes
- Edited by: A. Sreekar Prasad
- Music by: Ilaiyaraaja
- Production companies: Prakash Raj Productions; First Copy Pictures
- Distributed by: Mysore Talkies (Kannada); Abhishek Pictures (Telugu)
- Release date: 7 October 2016
- Running time: 111 minutes
- Country: India
- Languages: Telugu; Kannada

Idolle Ramayana (transl. It's a good Ramayana) in Kannada, shot simultaneously in Telugu as Mana Oori Ramayanam (transl. Our village's Ramayana), is a 2016 Indian comedy drama film directed by Prakash Raj. The film was produced by Prakash himself with Ramjee Narasiman under Prakash Raj Productions and First Copy Pictures. The film is a remake of 2012 Malayalam film Shutter with Jogi and Raman Gopisetti writing the dialogues for both versions simultaneously.

The film is shot in two languages, Kannada and Telugu, each with a slightly different cast. It stars Prakash Raj and Priyamani with Achyuth Kumar, Rangayana Raghu, Raghubabu, Prudhviraj, Aravind Kuplikar and Satyadev portraying supporting roles. The film's soundtrack was composed by Ilaiyaraaja. Both versions were released worldwide on 7 October 2016.

== Plot ==
The film is set against the backdrop of the Rama Navami festival. Bhujanga is a businessman who returned from Gulf is highly respected in his hometown. Bhujanga has invested in a small commercial property next to his house, which he has let out to the shopkeepers and except one of his shops lies vacant. He is short-tempered and doesn't want his daughter to study further and wants her to get married. His anger increases when his daughter is arrested for staging a protest, during the time he meets his friends every evening inside the vacant shop and they bond every night over a few drinks.

Bhujanga sees a prostitute Susheela and wants to bond with her, however, despite his intentions Bhujanga gets scared fearing that his reputation will be tarnished. During one such evening, Shiva an auto-rickshaw driver and a friend of Rajeeva brings the prostitute and locks her along with Bhujanga inside the vacant shop promising to unlock the shop shutter after they spend some time together inside the locked shop.

Meanwhile, Shiva meets one of his passengers, a film director, who had forgotten his bag in Shiva's autorickshaw that morning. Shiva told him he saw the bag, but he had left that inside the locked shop shutter, and that he will go back and get the bag and come. Director on knowing that he would get his bag back celebrates by offering a couple of drinks to Shiva, however, both get into trouble with the cops for drunken driving and fails to return that night to open the shutter as promised to Bhujanga. They both get released in the morning as inspector Ramdas is a good friend of the director. But Shiva could not come to unlock the shutter that night as well due to certain circumstances. This way Bhujanga and Susheela are forced to spend a couple of nights together inside the locked shutter waiting for Shiva's return to unlock it.

Trapped inside the shutter, Bhujanga through what he hears from outside learns many lessons about the real face of people who he had earlier considered as friends and foes and his attitude about many things in life changes. His initial disgust towards Susheela's apparent lack of manners also slowly goes away as he realises she is a good soul after all.

In the end, somebody unlocks the shutter and they both come out from the shutter. But they don't see anyone around and do not understand who opened the shutter. Bhujanga is confused and he goes into a home where he learns from his daughter that she had her friend open the lock. She indicates she knows everything but did not reveal it to everyone and trusts that her father is a good man whatever may happen. Bhujanga is moved by this and his experiences inside the shutter and he decides to postpone his daughter's marriage and allow her to study. The Director is seen to have got back the script from Susheela (while not explicitly revealing how they are related), as Susheela had earlier found the script inside the bag inside the shutter. But he decides to make a film on her incidents which happened in the shutter.

== Cast ==
Actor (Kannada)	Actor (Telugu)	Role
Prakash Raj		Bhujanga
Priyamani		Susheela
Teju Belawadi		Bhujanga's daughter
Sudha Belawadi		Bhujanga's wife
Bhargavi Narayan		Bhujanga's mother-in-law
Aravind Kuplikar	Satyadev	Shiva
Rangayana Raghu	Raghu Babu	Police inspector
Achyuth Kumar	Prudhviraj	film director
Ramesh Pandit		Broker
Shivajirao Jadhav		Tailor

== Soundtrack ==
Idolle Ramayana Mana Oori Ramayanam

Soundtrack album by Ilaiyaraaja
- Released: September 2016
- Genre: Feature film soundtrack
- Languages: Kannada; Telugu
- Labels: D Beats (Kannada) a Music (Telugu)

Ilaiyaraaja chronology
Kuttrame Thandanai (2016)	Idolle Ramayana; Mana Oori Ramayanam (2016)	Daffadar (2016)

Soundtrack has only one song composed and sung by Ilaiyaraaja. Just for one song the movie company released CD (Compact Disc) in both languages. It is one of the first.

No.	Title	Lyrics	Singer	Length
1.	"Idolle Ramayana" (Kannada Song)	Jayant Kaikini	Ilaiyaraaja	3:05
2.	"Mana Oori Ramayanam" (Telugu Song)	Bhaskarabhatla Ravikumar	Ilaiyaraaja	3:06

== Critical reception ==
Kannada version

Times of India wrote "This film is a definite must-watch for those who want cinema that doesn’t have the usual action, song and dance routines and look for a good storyline. The performances are the cherry on the cake here." The Hindu wrote "For those who have not watched the original, Idolle Ramayana offers a different experience, as it is rooted in nativity." Bangalore Mirror wrote "The film makes you laugh and sympathise at the plight of the characters. But what it lacks is a heartwarming experience because it is so clinically made and sanitised."

Telugu version

Sify wrote "Mana Oori Ramayanam is a moral fable told with deft direction by Prakash Raj. Priyamani's excellent performance is mainstay. Despite its length and slow pace, the middle portion makes an engrossing watch."
