= Ivan Megharoopan =

- Directed by: P. Balachandran
- Written by: P. Balachandran
- Produced by: Prakash Bare; Gopa Periyadan; Thampi Antony
- Starring: Prakash Bare; Padmapriya; Shweta Menon; Remya Nambeesan; Jagathy Sreekumar
- Cinematography: Rajeev Ravi
- Music by: Sharreth
- Release date: 27 July 2012
- Country: India
- Language: Malayalam

Ivan Megharoopan is a 2012 Malayalam biographical film written and directed by P. Balachandran. The film is about Malayalam poet P. Kunhiraman Nair and incorporates his autobiography, Kaviyude Kalpadukal. Prakash Bare, who is the producer of the film, also plays the protagonist K. P. Madhavan Nair.

== Cast ==
- Prakash Bare as K. P. Madhavan Nair
- Padmapriya as Ammini
- Shweta Menon as Maya Maheswari
- Remya Nambeesan as Rajalekshmi
- Jayapriya Sadanandan as Saraswathi Amma
- Anumol as Thankamani
- Jagathy Sreekumar as Appu Marar
- Chembil Ashokan as Aanapachan Aashan
- Kannur Sreelatha as Padmavathi
- V. K. Sreeraman as Kallattil Padmanabha Kurup
- Sunitha Nedungadi as Chinnammalu
- Surabhi Lakshmi as Kousalya
- Ambika Mohan as Madhavi
- Sajitha Madathil as Gomathi Teacher
- Antony Thekkek as Swami

== Production ==
=== Development ===
Ivan Megharoopan is P. Balachandran's debut film as a director. He has earlier written certain notable scripts including Ulladakkam, Pavithram and Punaradhivasam.

=== Casting ===
The audition for the casting was held at Kochi in October. The protagonist of the film is K. P. Madhavan Nair, a character which obviously reflects P. Kunhiraman Nair. Producer Prakash Bare was chosen to portray Madhavan Nair. Other cast members included Jagathy Sreekumar and Padmapriya.

"Aande Londe" was sung by Remya Nambeeshan.

== Soundtrack ==
The songs in the film are written by ONV Kurup and Kavalam Narayana Panikkar. It also includes a poem by "Mahakavi" P. Kunhiraman Nair, on whose life the film is based. Ivan Megharoopan original sound track was the first Malayalam release of Universal Music Group.

All music is composed by Sharreth.

No.	Title	Artist(s)	Length
1.	"Aande Londe"	Remya Nambeesan
2.	"Vishukili"	K. S. Chithra
3.	"Anuragini"	K. J. Yesudas
4.	"Yahi Madhva"	Ria Raju
5.	"Nisha Surabhi"	Shweta Mohan
6.	"Innale Njan"	Sunitha
7.	"O! Marimayan"	Krishnachandran, Mridula Warrier
8.	"Maya Gopabala"	Ria Raju
9.	"Vishukili"	K. S. Chithra, Sharreth
10.	"Nee Thane"	Delhi Prakash & Anjana

== Release and reception ==
Film released on 27 July 2012 with critics giving a positive review.
Paresh C. Palicha of Rediff.com rated the film and stated that the film has soul.
Sify.com gave the verdict as "good" and said that the film "succeeds in taking the viewer along with the narrative and the intriguing life of the poet has been presented in an attractive style."
Veeyen of Nowrunning.com also gave a rating and said that, the film "is full of life, and the vivaciousness that pervades the narrative lets the dazzling sparkle on this character study remain right on place."
The Times of India rated the film and stated that the film "is a moving, poignant account of a poet's life that gains a lot from a carefully chosen cast."
Theater Balcony gave a rating and wrote: "This one is one of the best from 2012 and cannot be missed for its feel, daring narration and the splendid performances. Surly Ivan Megharoopan will haunt us for long time."

== Awards ==
Kerala State Film Awards (2011)

- Second Best Film
- Best Music Director (song): Sharreth
- Best Editor: Vinod Sukumaran
- Best Dubbing Artist (Female): Praveena

14th John Abraham Awards

- Special Jury Award

Radio Mirchi Awards

- Best Songs
- Best Singer - KS Chithra
