= Amoeba (2016 film) =

- Poster
- Directed by: Manoj Kana
- Written by: Manoj Kana
- Produced by: Priyesh Kumar
- Starring: Anumol; Athmiya Rajan; Indrans; Anoop Chandran
- Cinematography: K. G. Jayan
- Music by: Chandran Veyattummal
- Production company: Neru Films
- Release date: 4 March 2016
- Running time: 93 minutes
- Country: India
- Language: Malayalam

Amoeba is a 2016 Indian Malayalam-language film directed by Manoj Kana. It is the second film directed by him after Chayilyam (2014). The film stars Aneesh G. Menon, Athmiya Rajan, Anumol, Indrans and Anoop Chandran in the lead roles.

== Plot ==
A woman from Kasargod lives amidst fears of contamination by Endosulfan.

The film captured two contrasting images of life in an IT hub in Bangalore with that of life in Endosulfan struck Kasargodu.

== Cast ==
- Aneesh G Menon
- Athmiya Rajan as Nimisha
- Anumol
- Anoop Chandran
- Indrans
- Manya
- Neethu Janardhanan
- Moideen Koya

== Awards ==
The film won the "Best Second Story" award at the 46th Kerala State Film Awards in 2016.
