= Yanthram =

Novel by Malayatoor Ramakrishnan

Yanthram (English: The Machine) is a Malayalam novel written by Malayatoor Ramakrishnan.

The novel is centred on the theme of civil service (Indian Administrative Service) in Kerala. It portrays the pressure exerted on popular governments by big business and the confrontation between the bureaucratic machinery and the political forces.

The novel received the Vayalar Award in 1979.
