= Orange Marangalude Veedu =

2019 film by Akhil Roshan AR

- Directed by: Bijukumar Damodaran
- Written by: Bijukumar Damodaran
- Produced by: Siraj Shah; Vijayasree; Bijukumar; Ushadevi
- Starring: Nedumudi Venu; Prakash Bare; P. Balachandran; Lally
- Cinematography: Yedhu Radhakrishnan
- Edited by: Davis Manuel
- Music by: Santhosh Chandran
- Release date: 20 November 2026
- Country: India
- Language: English

Orange Marangalude Veedu (lit. 'House of Orange Trees') is a 2020 Malayalam-language film written and directed by Dr. Biju. The film stars Nedumudi Venu, P. Balachandran, Prakash Bare, Lally, Lakshmi Marikar, and Master Yedhu. The film is about a grandfather and grandson. It examines their relationship as well as agriculture, politics, communalism and other socially relevant subjects. It takes place in Thiruvananthapuram, as well as Alappuzha, Wagamon, and Nagpur. The music is by Santhosh Chandran. The film is the first Indo-Chinese co-production. It was also the debut of cinematographer Yedhu Radhakrishnan (Kannan), the son of MJ Radhakrishnan.

== Cast ==
- Nedumudi Venu as Samuel
- Prakash Bare as Davis
- P. Balachandran as Raju
- Master Govardhan as Steve
- Jayaram Nair
- Deepak Shivaraman
- Jayaprakash Kuloor
- Shyam Reji
- Lali PM.
- Lakshmi Marikar

== Production ==
Production was done by Studio Media.

Production support partner Singapore Kairalee Film Forum

== Awards and recognition ==
The film was selected for the Indian Film Festival of Cincinnati in 2021.

It was also selected for the 24th Kolkata International Film Festival.
