= Panchami (film) =

- Theatrical release poster
- Directed by: Hariharan
- Written by: Malayattoor Ramakrishnan
- Screenplay by: Hariharan
- Produced by: Hari Pothan
- Starring: Prem Nazir; Jayan; Jayabharathi; Adoor Bhasi
- Cinematography: Melli Irani
- Edited by: G. Venkittaraman
- Music by: M. S. Viswanathan
- Production company: Supriya
- Distributed by: Supriya
- Release date: 24 June 1976
- Country: India
- Language: Malayalam

Panchami is a 1976 Indian Malayalam-language film written by Malayattoor Ramakrishnan, directed by Hariharan and produced by Hari Pothan under the banner of Supriya. The film stars Prem Nazir, Jayan, Jayabharathi and Adoor Bhasi in lead roles. The film has musical score by M. S. Viswanathan, while cinematography was handled by Melli Irani. The film was a commercial success at the box office. The film is also noted for being Jayan's breakthrough role.

== Cast ==
- Prem Nazir as Soman
- Jayan as Forest ranger John
- Jayabharathi as Panchami
- Adoor Bhasi as Gangan
- Sankaradi as Yohannan muthalali
- Meena as Periyakka
- Bahadoor as Philipose
- Balan K. Nair as Kochuvareed
- KPAC Sunny as Kannan
- Kottarakkara Sreedharan Nair as Moopan
- Master Raghu as Chinnan
- Sreelatha Namboothiri as Kathreena
- N. Govindankutty as Poochary
- Nedumangad Krishnan
- Nellikode Bhaskaran as Kunjunni
- Paravoor Bharathan as DFO
- Usharani as Rukku
- Cochin Haneefa

== Release ==
The film was released on 24 June 1976. The film was commercial success.

== Soundtrack ==
The music was composed by M. S. Viswanathan.

No.	Song	Singers	Lyrics	Length (m:ss)
1	"Anuraaga Surabhila"	K. J. Yesudas	Yusufali Kecheri	
2	"Panchami Paalaazhi"	P. Jayachandran	Yusufali Kecheri	
3	"Rajanigandhi"	Jolly Abraham	Yusufali Kecheri	
4	"Theyyathom"	Vani Jayaram	Yusufali Kecheri	
5	"Vannaathikkili"	P. Susheela	Yusufali Kecheri	
6	"Vannaatte Oh My Dear"	P. Jayachandran	Yusufali Kecheri	
