= Agnidevan =

- Poster
- Directed by: Venu Nagavalli
- Written by: P. Balachandran; Venu Nagavalli
- Produced by: Shobha Anand
- Starring: Mohanlal; Revathi; Devan; Bharat Gopy; Jagadish
- Cinematography: K. P. Nambiathiri
- Edited by: N. Gopalakrishnan
- Music by: M. G. Radhakrishnan
- Production company: Mahasudharshana Creations
- Distributed by: Starplus Release
- Release date: 23 October 1995
- Running time: 159 minutes
- Country: India
- Language: Malayalam

Agnidevan (transl. Lord of fire) is a 1995 Indian Malayalam-language family drama film directed by Venu Nagavalli and co-written by P. Balachandran and Nagavalli. It stars Mohanlal and Revathi. The plot deals with the struggle for leadership of a family-owned newspaper firm causing the family to split apart. Agnidevan was released on October 23 during the Diwali holiday period. The film features music composed by M. G. Radhakrishnan.

== Plot ==
The story is about the conflict between two brothers who share the legacy of "Malayalam Shabdam", a newspaper company owned by their family, the Ezhuthupura Tharavadu. Their careers as writers and publishers cause rivalry to form between them. While one brother Rama Varma also known as 'Appan' has a clinical business-oriented attitude to growing the newspaper industry that he leads, the younger brother Ravi Varma also known as 'Aniyankuttan' feels emotional and passionate about the craft of writing and reporting. He gives everything to enrich his relationships and cannot understand how to approach them with business goals because writing, in itself, marks tradition, legacy and so much more in their family of distinguished writers, such as their poet grandmother, Vishwalakshmi Thampuratti, their editor father, K. K. Menon, and their writer cousin, Sudarshana. Appan is manipulated by their company's manager Anantharaman who has ulterior motives to fulfill by capturing the newspaper firm.

There is love between Aniyankuttan and Sudarshana, but Appan interferes in their relationship to gain the empire and lady upon the advice of Anantharaman. Aniyankuttan's parents are depicted as different to each other, such as his flamboyant and modern mother, who whiles away her time playing rummy and partying with her friends in the ladies' club and supporting her elder son's dictates, and his intellectual and down-to-earth father who considers that his life is incomplete without writing. The younger brother wins his grandmother's and their newspaper's legacy by becoming a wealthy liquor baron to take back the company from the hands of Anantharaman.

The film ends with the grandmother passing away due to the grief of seeing her family breaking from differences and fights. Anantharaman is beaten up and banished by Aniyankuttan and his friends when he tries to usurp the grandmother's house. Her death and her burning pyre make Appan and his mother realize their mistakes and unite all the estranged family members once again. Aniyankuttan, after being united with Sudarshana, takes a vow before his grandmother's burning pyre that he will never let the family become disunited.

== Cast ==
- Mohanlal as Ravi "Aniyankuttan" Varma
- Rohini Hattangadi as Vishwalakshmi Thampuratti ('Muttashi')- the elderly matriarch of the Ezhuthupura family; Aniyankuttan's maternal grandmother
- Ratheesh as Anantharaman
- Revathi as Sudarshana (Sudhu), Aniyankuttan's cousin
- Devan as Rama "Appan" Varma, Aniyankuttan's elder brother
- Bharat Gopy as K. K. Menon, Appan's and Aniyan's father
- Jagadish as Murukan
- Sukumari as Kochammini, Sudhu's mother
- Karamana Janardhanan Nair as Vasudeva Warrier
- Kavitha as Parvathi Varma, Muttasshi's daughter and Aniyankuttan's mother
- Maniyanpilla Raju as Poojari Potti Kunju
- Mala Aravindan as Vijayan, the mahout
- Poojappura Ravi as Payapaddan
- Mohan Jose as Jacob
- Beena Antony as Daughter of Vasudeva Warrier
- P. Balachandran as 'Edakka' Marar
- Captain Raju as Pareed
- T. P. Madhavan as Sathyan, Sudhu's uncle
- Valsala Menon as Ashram Head
- Kollam Ajith as Victor Raj, a goon
- James Stalin as Minister

== Production ==
The film was shot in Guruvayoor.

== Soundtrack ==
The film includes songs written by lyricist Gireesh Puthenchery and composed by M. G. Radhakrishnan. The songs became chartbusters especially "Nilavinte Neela Bhasmam" sung by M. G. Sreekumar. The soundtrack album was released by Wilson Audios on 15 October 1995. Puthenchery won the Kerala State Film Award for Best Lyricist for this film.

No.	Title	Singer(s)	Length
1.	"Akshara Nakshathra"	M. G. Sreekumar	4:38
2.	"Nilaavinte"	M. G. Sreekumar	4:26
3.	"Saama Gaana"	M. G. Sreekumar, K. S. Chithra	4:36
4.	"Suralala Nathaka"	M. G. Sreekumar, Mano, Kalyani Menon	4:04

== Accolades ==
- Kerala State Film Award for Best Lyricist - Gireesh Puthenchery
- Kerala Film Critics Association Awards' Special Jury Award - Venu Nagavally
