= Odukkam Thudakkam =

- Theatrical release poster
- Directed by: Malayattoor Ramakrishnan
- Written by: Malayattoor Ramakrishnan
- Screenplay by: Malayattoor Ramakrishnan
- Produced by: M. O. Joseph
- Starring: Ratheesh; Kalaranjini; Rajkumar; K. P. Ummer
- Cinematography: Vipin Das
- Edited by: M. S. Mani
- Music by: G. Devarajan
- Production company: Manjilas
- Distributed by: Chalachitra
- Release date: 12 March 1982
- Country: India
- Language: Malayalam

Odukkam Thudakkam is a 1982 Indian Malayalam-language film, directed by Malayattoor Ramakrishnan and produced by M. O. Joseph. The film stars Ratheesh, Kalaranjini, Rajkumar and K. P. Ummer in the lead roles. The film has a musical score by G. Devarajan.

== Cast ==
- Ratheesh
- Kalaranjini
- Rajkumar
- K. P. Ummer
- Nanditha Bose

== Soundtrack ==
The music was composed by G. Devarajan with lyrics by Malayattoor Ramakrishnan, P. Bhaskaran and Pulamaipithan.

No.	Song	Singers	Lyrics	Length (m:ss)
1	"Aaromale Amale Aaradhike Azhake"	K. J. Yesudas	Malayattoor Ramakrishnan	
2	"Ente Sankalpa Mandaakini"	K. J. Yesudas	P. Bhaskaran	
3	"Kaalai Vantha Sooriyane"	P. Madhuri, Chorus	Pulamaipithan	
