= Lakshaprabhu =

- Directed by: P. Bhaskaran
- Written by: Malayattoor Ramakrishnan
- Produced by: K. Ravindran Nair
- Starring: Prem Nazir; Sheela; Sukumari; Adoor Bhasi
- Cinematography: E. N. Balakrishnan
- Edited by: Das; G. Venkittaraman
- Music by: M. S. Baburaj
- Production company: General Pictures
- Release date: 1 August 1968
- Country: India
- Language: Malayalam

Lakshaprabhu is a 1968 Indian Malayalam-language film, directed by P. Bhaskaran and produced by Raveendranathan Nair. The film stars Prem Nazir, Sheela, Sukumari and Adoor Bhasi. The film had musical score by M. S. Baburaj.

== Cast ==
- Prem Nazir
- Sheela
- Sukumari
- Adoor Bhasi
- Manavalan Joseph
- Pattom Sadan
- P. J. Antony
- P. K. Nair
- Sankaradi
- Bhadran
- Bahadoor
- G. K. Pillai
- Jayanthi
- K. P. Ummer
- Khadeeja
- Master Ayyappan
- Master Sathyan
- Meena
- K. S. Parvathy
- Panicker
- Prathapan
- Ravikumar
- Johnson
- Padmakumar

== Soundtrack ==
The music was composed by M. S. Baburaj and the lyrics were written by P. Bhaskaran.

No.	Song	Singers	Length
1	"Karayum Kadalthirayum"	K. J. Yesudas	
2	"Manmadhanaam Chithrakaaran"	P. Jayachandran	
3	"Panamoru Ballaatha"	C. O. Anto	
4	"Swarnavalakalitta"	S. Janaki	
5	"Vennilaavinenthariyaam"	S. Janaki	
