= Verukal =

1966 novel by Malayattoor Ramakrishnan

Verukal (Roots)
- The cover of Verukal
- Author: Malayattoor Ramakrishnan
- Original title: വേരുകൾ
- Translator: V. Abdulla
- Cover artist: N. Ajayan
- Language: Malayalam
- Genre: Semi-autobiographical novel
- Publisher: D. C. Books
- Publication date: 1966
- Publication place: India
- English publication date: 2002
- Pages: 132
- ISBN: 81-7130-858-9

Verukal (English: Roots) is a Malayalam semi-autobiographical novel written by Malayattoor Ramakrishnan in 1966. It is widely credited as one of his best works. It won the Kerala Sahitya Akademi Award in 1967.

== Plot summary ==
Verukal tells the story of a family of Tamil speaking Iyers who settled in Kerala. Raghu is the protagonist of the story. The pivotal event on which the novel turns is the return of Raghu to his native village after a lapse of several years, to raise money to build a city mansion for himself by selling his ancestral home. He sets about this reluctantly, under pressure from his shrewish and domineering wife. In the village, as he meets his sisters and others among whom he grew up, a flood of memories overwhelms him, and he abruptly changes his mind about selling the property.

== Main characters ==
- Raghu - the protagonist
- Ammulu - Raghu eldest sister
- Lakshmi - Raghu's sister
- Maniyan Athimbaar - Ammulu's husband
- Yajneswarayyar (Ammaanchi) - Lakshmi's husband
- Vishwanathan Iyer - Raghu's father
- Amma - Raghu's mother
- Aadi Narayana Swami (Patta) - Raghu's grandpa
- Ganapathi Patta - Raghu's great grandpa
- Geetha - Raghu's wife
- Ajayan - Raghu's son
- Suma -Raghu's daughter
- Saraswathy - Raghu's younger sister
- Bharathan - Saraswathy's husband
- Rajappan - Raghu's Roommate
- Raman Karthav - manakkale karyasthan
- Periyappa (appu) - Raghu's uncle
