= Shutter (2012 film) =

- Promotional poster
- Directed by: Joy Mathew
- Written by: Joy Mathew
- Produced by: Saritha Ann Thomas
- Starring: Lal; Sreenivasan; Vinay Forrt; Sajitha Madathil; Riya Saira
- Cinematography: Hari Nair
- Edited by: Bijith Bala
- Music by: Songs: Shahabaz Aman; Zubin Imtiaz; Score: Biby Sam; Jacob Panikker
- Production company: Abra Films
- Distributed by: Popcorn Entertainments (Australia & New Zealand)
- Release dates: 9 December 2012 (IFFK); 22 February 2013 (theaterical)
- Running time: 134 minutes
- Country: India
- Language: Malayalam

Shutter is a 2012 Indian Malayalam thriller film written and directed by theater actor and playwright Joy Mathew in his directorial debut. The film, set and filmed, in Kozhikode, stars Lal, Sreenivasan, Vinay Forrt, Sajitha Madathil and Riya Saira. Renganaath Ravee handled the sound design, and Hari Nair was the cinematographer. The film notably features a poem by Pablo Neruda, set to music and sung by Shahabaz Aman. Biby Sam and Jacob Panikker composed the background score for the film.

Claimed to be a part of the new-wave in Malayalam cinema, the film is a satire about Indian laborers in the Gulf and is set within two days and a night in the city of Kozhikode. The film portrays unexpected incidents happening in two days and a night in the city of Kozhikode. The story centers around the mess created by three men — a Gulf Malayali, a film director and an auto driver — after they meet a strange woman in bizarre circumstance. The film is a moral suspense thriller and according to the director it is "poetical violence on celluloid".

The film had its Indian premiere at the 17th International Film Festival of Kerala and international premiere at the 9th Dubai International Film Festival. It won the Silver Crow Pheasant Award for Best Feature Film (Audience Prize) at the 17th International Film Festival of Kerala.

The film was a critical and commercial success, which led to its remakes Shutter (2014) in Marathi and Oru Naal Iravil (2015) in Tamil. It was also remade in Tulu in 2016 as Shutterdulai. Prakash Raj remade the movie into Kannada-Telugu bilingual called Idolle Ramayana in Kannada and Mana Oori Ramayanam in Telugu. It was also remade in Punjabi in 2016 as Lock.

This is the only movie to have a version in all five South Indian languages. With six remakes, it is one of the most remade movies in India.

== Plot ==
Rasheed is an NRI working in the Gulf. He comes to his hometown Kozhikode on a vacation for his daughter's engagement. Rasheed has invested in a commercial property next to his house which he has let out to store owners, except for one room. During his holiday, he meets his friends here and they bond every night over a few peg of drinks. During one of these days, Rasheed's friend Nanmarayil Suran, an autorickshaw driver, locks him with a prostitute in a garage from the outside to let the two have some fun. He fails to turn up as promised and the two end up spending two nights and one day together in the garage. The rest of the narrative revolves around the embarrassing plight of these two and the lives of Suran, Thankam and Manoharan.

== Cast ==
- Lal as Rasheed
- Sreenivasan as Director Manoharan
- Vinay Forrt as Nanmayil Suran
- Sajitha Madathil as Thankam, the prostitute
- Riya Saira as Nyla, Rasheed's daughter
- Nisha Joseph as Rasheed's wife
- Augustine as Prabhu
- Prem Kumar as S.I. Subhashchandran
- Vijayan Karanthoor
- Appunni Sasi

== Production ==
The film marks the directorial debut of Joy Mathew, who is a well known face in the Malayalam drama industry and shot to fame in films by portraying the central character in John Abraham's classic film Amma Ariyan. Noted theatre actor Sajtha Madathil plays the female lead in the film while Apoorvaragam fame Vinay Forrt plays the role of an autorickshaw driver. The film includes about sixty experienced theatre actors from Kerala and Gulf countries. Academy Award-winning sound designer Resul Pookutty was initially approached for the film's sound recording. When he opted out, another noted sound designer Renganaath Ravee was chosen. The sound mixing was done by M. R. Rajakrishnan. National award-winning cinematographer Hari Nair wields camera for the film. A longtime friend of Joy Mathew, Nair is making his comeback to Malayalam cinema after quite a long gap with this film.

The film was completely shot from Kozhikode and was completed by July 2012.

== Soundtrack ==
Shutter

Soundtrack album by Shahabaz Aman, Zubin Imtiaz, Biby Sam
- Released: 15 February 2013
- Recorded: 2012
- Genre: Feature film soundtrack
- Length: 12:50
- Language: Malayalam
- Label: Muzik247
- Producer: Shahabaz Aman

Shahabaz Aman chronology
Bavuttiyude Namathil (2012)	Shutter (2013)	Rose Guitarinaal (2013)

The soundtrack to the film features three songs. The first is a translation of Veinte poemas de amor by Pablo Neruda, written, set to music and sung by Shahabaz Aman. A teenage school student from Kozhikkode, Zubin Imtiaz, was approached to provide a bilingual song, "Kyun". Along with Jacob Panikker, he penned the Hindi lyrics while Joy Mathew provided the Malayalam verse. Zubin and Biby Sam composed the music for the song. The third song which is briefly heard sung by Joy Mathew in a cameo appearance in the film, is played during the ending credits. The lyricist of this old folk song is not known.

Shutter (Original Motion Picture Soundtrack)
No.	Title	Lyrics	Music	Singer(s)	Length
1.	"Ee Raathriyil"	Pablo Neruda/ Shahabaz Aman	Shahabaz Aman	Shahabaz Aman	4:56
2.	"Kyun"	Zubin Imtiaz, Jacob Panikker, Joy Mathew	Zubin Imtiaz, Biby Sam	Avni Joglekar, Tejas	5:03
3.	"Naadu Kaani"	Anonymous	Traditional	Joy Mathew	2:51
Total length:					12:50

== Release and reception ==
=== Film festival screening ===
The film had its Indian premiere on 9 December 2012 at the 17th International Film Festival of Kerala where it was screened in the International Competition Section. The film's international premiere was at the 9th Dubai International Film Festival where it was screened on 10 December at the Cross Section of Indian Films section. The film had won the Silver Crow Pheasant award for the best movie in the Audience Choice section.

=== Theatrical release ===
The film had its theatrical release on 22 February 2013. Gold Coin Motion Pictures, owned by ace film director, Ranjith Balakrishnan, and Seven Arts pictures has taken the distribution rights.

=== Critical response ===
Veeyen of Nowrunning.com stated that "Joy Mathew's directorial debut reinstates your faith in fine cinema, and has already made it to my list of the most gratifying films of the year." He also added that "Shutter is a keenly observed drama on human predicament that appears delectably funny at times and palpably poignant at others."

Paresh Palicha of Rediff.com says "Shutter which has already won critical acclaim deserves to be successful at the box office too."

Rating the film 3 stars out of 5, Dalton L of Deccan Chronicle says "Joy Mathew's drama, through an act of trust, forces open the shutters of the conservative eyes of a moralist with double standards, humbles him, and sets him free from the shackles of his sinful thoughts."

The Times of India called Lal's performance "stunning" and said that "Vinay pulls off a performance that overshadows Lal, Sajitha and Sreenivasan." The Hindu said the film "celebrates the sights and smells of Kozhikode" and while "the twist comes a bit too delayed", the film "fully taps the curiosity factor, making the audience feel for each well-shaped character".

film fare awards,

- International Film Festival of Kerala (2012): Silver Crow Pheasant Award (Rajata Chakoram) for Best Feature Film (Audience Prize)

== Remakes ==
Shutter has been remade in several languages and is set to be remade in Hindi.

Year	Film	Language
2014	Shutter	Marathi
2015	Oru Naal Iravil	Tamil
2016	Shutterdulai	Tulu
2016	Idolle Ramayana	Kannada
2016	Mana Oori Ramayanam	Telugu
2016	Lock	Punjabi
