= P. Kunhiraman Nair =

Indian writer (1905–1978)

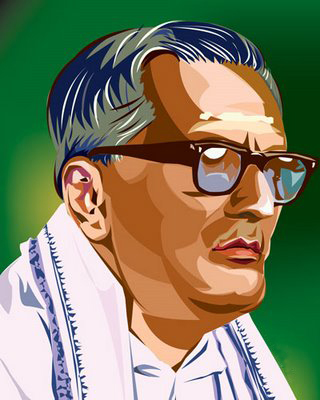
- Drawing of P Kunhiraman Nair
- Born: 4 October 1905; Bellikoth, Kanhangad, British India
- Died: 27 May 1978 (aged 72); Thiruvananthapuram, Kerala, India
- Occupations: Teacher, Poet
- Spouse: Kunjilakshmi
- Children: 4
- Writing career
- Genre: Poetry
- Notable awards: 1959 Kerala Sahitya Akademi Award for Poetry; 1967 Sahitya Akademi Award

Panayanthitta Kunhiraman Nair (4 October 1905 – 27 May 1978), also known as Mahakavi P, is an Indian writer of Malayalam literature. He was known for his romantic poems which detailed the natural beauty of his home state of Kerala in South India as well as the realities of his life and times. He received the inaugural Kerala Sahitya Akademi Award for Poetry in 1959. He was also a recipient of the Sahitya Akademi Award.

== Biography ==
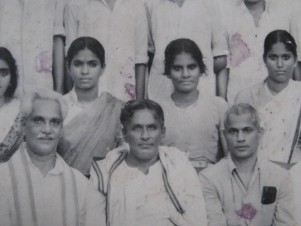
A group photo taken at Koodali High School.

P. Kunhiraman Nair was born on 4 October 1905, at Bellikoth near Kanhangad, in Kasaragod district of the south Indian state of Kerala to Puravankara Kunjambu Nair, a Sanskrit scholar, physician and vedantin and his wife, Panayanthitta Kunjamma Amma. His early schooling was with traditional teachers as well as at the local primary school before studying Sanskrit at the school run by Punnassery Nambi Neelakanda Sharma in Pattambi (the present-day Sree Neelakanta Government Sanskrit College Pattambi) where he was reported to be a lazy student.

It was during this time, Nair started writing poems. He also fell in love with a local girl by name, Vattoli Kunjilakshmy. Subsequently, he moved to Tanjavur to continue his Sanskrit and Vedanta studies when his family arranged his marriage with Puravankara Janaki Amma, his cousin and bride-designate as per local customs. However, he declined the proposal and instead, married his lover, Kunjilakshmy. After marriage, he founded a magazine, Navajeevan, which was published from Kannur but after the publication became defunct, he worked at Saraswathi Press in Thrissur and Sree Ramakrishnodayam Press in Olavakkode. Later, he joined Koodali High School as a Malayalam teacher ad after a while, moved to Rajas High School Kollengode from where he superannuated from service. He died on 27 May 1978, at the age of 72, while he was staying at C. P. Sathram, a lodging facility in Thiruvananthapuram. He is survived by his son, P. Ravindran Nair, daughter Leela, Radha and Balamani.

== Legacy ==
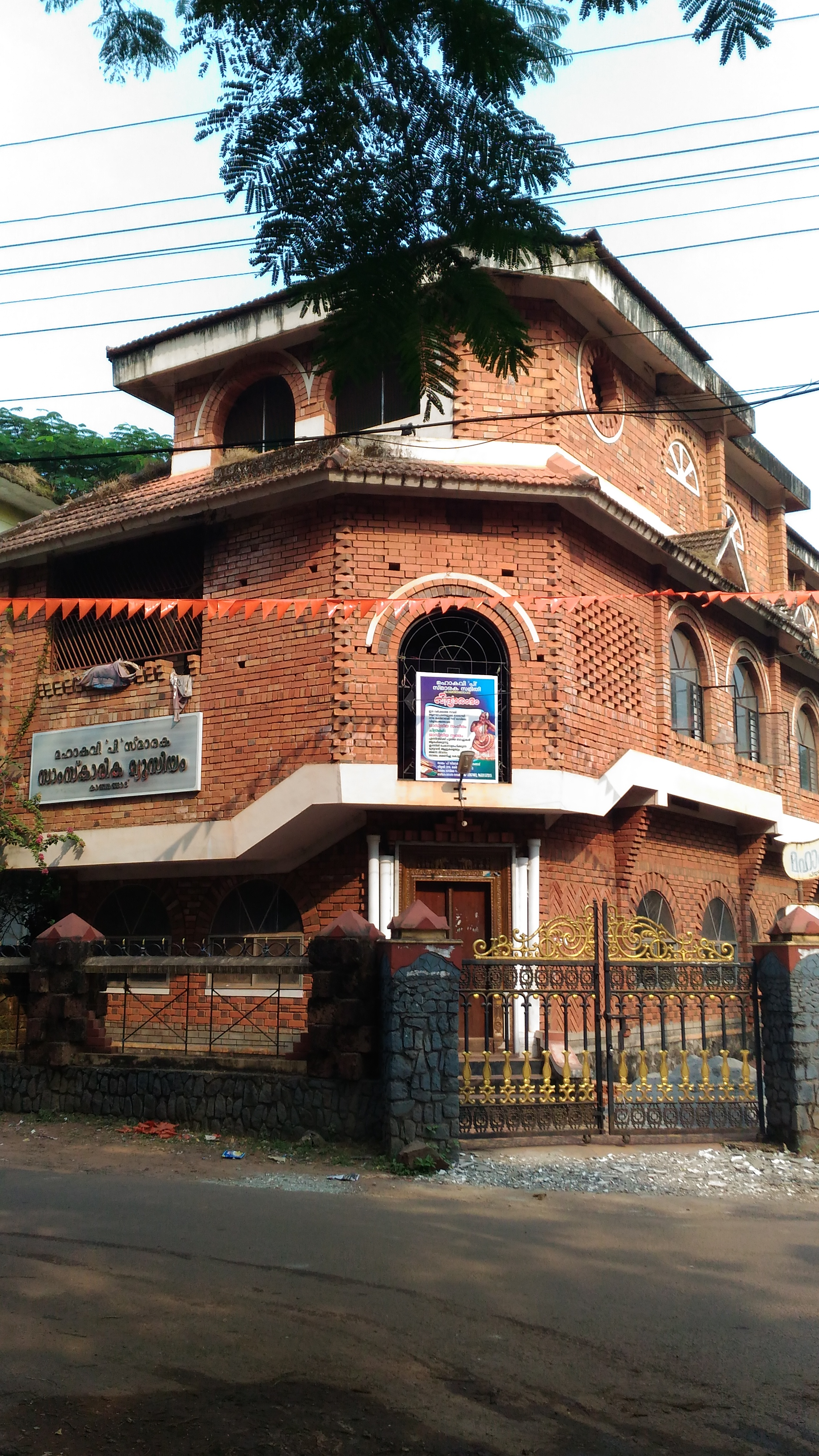
P. Memorial at Kanhangad

P., as he was popularly known, was a habitual nomad and was reported to have led a bohemian lifestyle, wandering across Kerala, living in several places, meeting their people and making them part of his life and literature. Poetry formed his main genre of work, though he has also written novels, short stories, articles and plays. While during the initial stages of his literary career, Nair wrote spiritual poems, Nirapara published in 1944, started a new phase which showed his leaning towards nature and symbolism. His autobiography, Kaviyude Kaalpaadukal (The Footprints of a Poet), with foreword by M. T. Vasudevan Nair, is one of the celebrated works in prose in Malayalam. Thamarathoni, written during his days in Kollengode, Kaliyachan, Vayalkarayil, Ratholsavam and Pookkalam are a few of his known poems.

== Honours ==
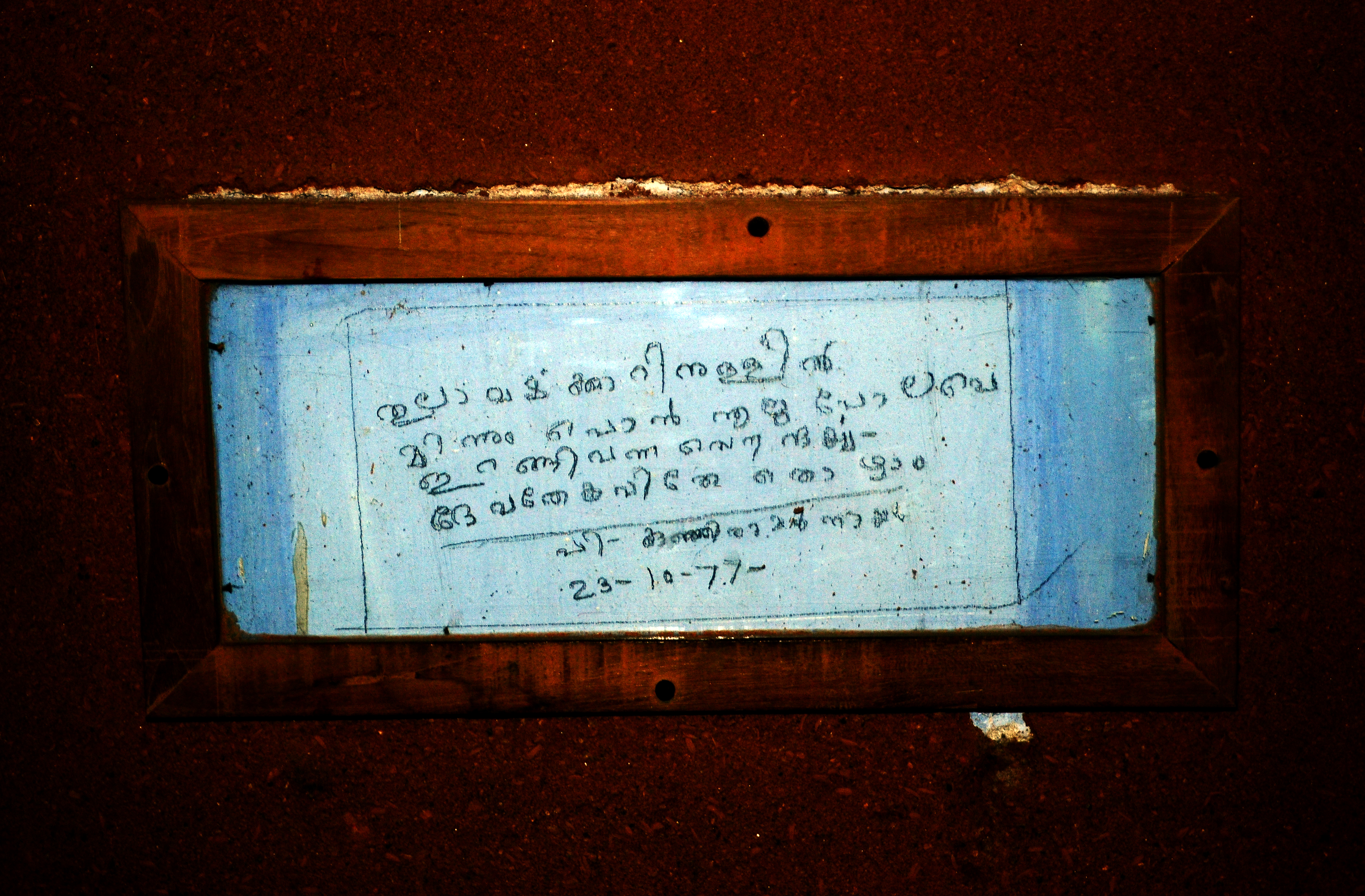
A short handwritten poem

The Raja of Nileshwaram honoured Nair with the title Bhakthakavi and presented him with a veerashrungala (golden bracelet) in 1949 and he received the title of Sahitya Nipunan in 1963 from the Raja of Kochi. Kerala Sahitya Akademi selected Kaliyachan of Kunhiraman Nair for their inaugural Kerala Sahitya Akademi Award for Poetry in 1959. He received the Kendra Sahithya Academy Award for his work, Thamarathoni, in 1967.

In 1981, Eyamkode Sreedharan, with the help of Venugopala Varma, the then Raja of Kollengode who donated a plot of land, initiated the efforts to build a memorial for the poet in Kollengode which was subsequently taken up by the Government of Kerala to establish the Mahakavi P. Memorial Art and Culture Centre. The centre houses music school, a library, Kerala Kalabhavan which is a school for kathakali. The centre also holds performances in folk and classical art forms such as Kathakali, Kanyarkali and Porattukali.

A government vocational school at Nair's native place, Bellikoth, has been named after him as Mahakavi P. Smaraka Government Vocational Higher Secondary School and a town hall in Kanhangad has been named Mahakavi P Memorial Hall. Kanhangad also has another memorial of the poet, Mahakavi P. Memorial which was designed by M. V. Devan and houses a library and a public reading room. The upper floor of the building has since been converted into a museum and all the books and articles written by the poet, the chair and dresses used by him, as well as a gold chain presented by the Guruvayur Devaswomm on his 60th birthday are in display there. There are two eponymous organisations, Mahakavi P Foundation, based in Thiruvananthapuram and Mahakavi P. Smaraka Samithi, based in Kanhangad; the former has instituted an annual literary award, Kaliyachan Award and the latter manages two awards for recognising excellence in Malayalam poetry, the Mahakavi P Memorial Award for Poetry and Poetry Award for Young Poets.

== In popular culture ==
Ivan Megharoopan, a 2012 Malayalam biopic, written and directed by P. Balachandran with Prakash Bare in the lead role, is based on the life of poet as detailed in his autobiography, Kaviyude Kalpadukal. His 1959 poem Kaliyachan, has been adapted into a feature film produced by the National Film Development Corporation under the same name with Manoj K. Jayan in the lead; the film received three awards at the 2012 Kerala State Film Awards.

== Bibliography ==
=== Poetry ===
- P. Kunhiraman Nair (1954). Kaliyacchan. DC Books. ISBN 9788171308200. Archived from the original on 6 March 2019.
- P. Kunhiraman Nair (1960). Onassadya.
- Kunhiraman Nair, P. (1964). Pookkalam. Kottayam: Sahitya Pravarthaka Co-operative Society. Archived from the original on 6 March 2019.
- Kunhiraman Nair, P. (1993). Thamarathoni. Kottayam: Sahitya Pravarthaka Co-operative Society.
- P. Kunhiraman Nair (1972). Vasantholsavam.
- Kunhiraman Nair, P. (1974). Chilampoli. Calicut: Mathrubhumi Books.
- P. Kunhiraman Nair (1978). Ratholsavam (2 volumes).
- P. Kunhiraman Nair (1983). Thamarathen.
- P. Kunhiraman Nair (1983). Mekalaeyude Magal.
- Kunhiraman Nair, P. (1994). Karpooramazha. Kottayam: D C Books. ISBN 9788171303861.
- P. Kunhiraman Nair. Koduthumudinja Maavu.
- P. Kunhiraman Nair. Thirumudimaala.
- Kunjiraman Nair, P. (1997). Prakrithipooja. Current Books, Thrissur: Current Books.
- P. Kunhiraman Nair. Neeranjanam.
- P. Kunhiraman Nair. Prapancham.
- P. Kunhiraman Nair. Soundarya Devatha.
- P. Kunhiraman Nair. Balamrutham (2 volumes).
- P. Kunhiraman Nair. Anthithiri.
- P. Kunhiraman Nair. Nakshathramaala.
- Kunhiraman Nair, P. (1967). Nirvaannanisha. Kozhikode: Poorna.
- P. Kunhiraman Nair. Nishaagaanam athava Gaanamaala.
- Kunhiraman Nair, P. (1966). Nirapara. Kozhikode: P. K. Brothers.
- P. Kunhiraman Nair. Padavaal.
- P. Kunhiraman Nair. Pirannamannil.
- P. Kunhiraman Nair. Poothaali.
- P. Kunhiraman Nair. Poombaattakal.
- P. Kunhiraman Nair. Prema Pournami.
- P. Kunhiraman Nair. Bhadradeepam.
- P. Kunhiraman Nair. Manalthariyude Chiri.
- P. Kunhiraman Nair. Mankudathinte Vila.
- P. Kunhiraman Nair. Malanadu.
- P. Kunhiraman Nair. Malanadinte Mahasandesham.
- P. Kunhiraman Nair. Yamunathadathile Smarakakshethram.
- Kunhiraman Nair, P. (1970). Vayalkkarayil. Kottayam: Sahitya Pravarthaka Co-operative Society.
- P. Kunhiraman Nair. Vasanthippookkal.
- P. Kunhiraman Nair. Shankhanadam.
- P. Kunhiraman Nair. Shreeramacharitham.
- P. Kunhiraman Nair. Seethadevi athava Varabhiksha.
- P. Kunhiraman Nair. Ananthan Kaattil.
- P. Kunhiraman Nair. Veeraradhana.
- P. Kunhiraman Nair (2017). Theranjedutha Kavithakal. DC Books. ISBN 9788126411665. Archived from the original on 6 March 2019.

=== Short stories and novels ===
- P. Kunhiraman Nair. Dharmarajyam.
- P. Kunhiraman Nair. Naganandam.
- P. Kunhiraman Nair. Karnan.
- P. Kunhiraman Nair. Indira.
- P. Kunhiraman Nair. Chandranathan.
- P. Kunhiraman Nair. Charithraraksha.
- P. Kunhiraman Nair. Narendranathan.
- P. Kunhiraman Nair. Nirmala.
- P. Kunhiraman Nair. Ramabai.
- P. Kunhiraman Nair. Veeraprathijna.
- P. Kunhiraman Nair. Sathyaraksha.

=== Plays ===
- P. Kunhiraman Nair. Upasana.
- P. Kunhiraman Nair. Premachandran.
- P. Kunhiraman Nair. Rangamandapam.
- P. Kunhiraman Nair. Randu Ekangangal.
- P. Kunhiraman Nair. Swapna Sanchari.
- P. Kunhiraman Nair. Veeraaradhana.
- P. Kunhiraman Nair. Sashirekha Parinayam.
- P. Kunhiraman Nair. Poonilavu.
- P. Kunhiraman Nair. Chandramanadalam.

=== Prose ===
- P. Kunhiraman Nair. Keralathile Kedavilakkukal.
- P. Kunhiraman Nair. Akshayadeepam.
- P. Kunhiraman Nair. Mekhamala.
- Kunhiraman Nair P (2000). Vichara Viharam (2 volumes). D.C Books: D.C Books.
- P. Kunhiraman Nair. Sathyaraksha.
- P. Kunhiraman Nair. Parayipetta Panthirukulam.
- P. Kunhiraman Nair. Udayaragam.
- P. Kunhiraman Nair. Prathibankuram.

=== Memoirs and biography ===
- P. Kunhiraman Nair (2007). Kaviyude Kalpadukal. a. ISBN 9788126411658. Archived from the original on 6 March 2019.
- Kunhiraman Nair, P. (1977). Enne thirayunna njaan. Kottayam: D. C. Books.
- Kunjiraman Nair, P. (1997). Nithyakanyakaye Thedi. D.C. Books: D.C. Books. Archived from the original on 6 March 2019.
- Kunhiraman Nair, P. (2012). Rabindranatha Tagore - Oru Cheruchithram. Calicut: Lipi. ISBN 9788188015054.

=== Translations ===
- P .Kunhiraman Nair; P. K. N. Panicker (2017). Selected Poems of Mahakavi P .Kunhiraman Nair: From God's Own Country (1 ed.). Authorspress. p. 142. ISBN 978-9352074723.
