= Udalaazham =

- Official poster
- Directed by: Unnikrishnan Avala
- Screenplay by: Unnikrishnan Avala
- Produced by: Dr. Manoj K. T.; Dr. Rajesh Kumar M. P.; Dr. Sajish M.
- Starring: Mani P. R.; Remya Valsala; Anumol; Indrans; Joy Mathew; Sajitha Madathil; Nilambur Ayisha
- Cinematography: Mohamed A.
- Edited by: Appu N. Bhattathiri
- Music by: Sithara, Mithun Jayaraj; Background Score: Bijibal; Sound Design: Renganaath Ravee; Sound Mixing: Ajith A George
- Production company: Doctors' Dilemma
- Distributed by: 72 Film Company
- Release dates: 20 October 2018 (MAMI); 6 December 2019 (Kerala)
- Running time: 119 minutes
- Country: India
- Languages: Paniya, Malayalam

Udalaazham (lit. Body Deep) is a 2018 Indian Paniya / Malayalam drama film written and directed by Unnikrishnan Avala. It features actors Mani, Remya Valsala, Anumol, Indrans, Sajitha Madathil, Joy Mathew and Nilambur Ayisha in the lead roles. Produced by Dr. Manoj K. T., Dr. Rajesh Kumar M. P. and Dr. Sajish M. under the banner of Doctors' Dilemma, it is Avala's debut feature.

The film premiered at 20th Mumbai Film Festival in October 2018 before doing rounds at the festival circuit including the International Film Festival of Kerala and Indian Film Festival of Melbourne. The film presented by Aashiq Abu is scheduled to release theatrically on 6 December 2019.

== Plot ==
Gulikan, a tribal transgender from the deep jungle settlement in Kerala was married in childhood to Maathi. Born and brought up as a boy, he has the soul of a girl. He is constantly being abused whenever he steps out of the forest looking for work. Two unfortunate love affairs culminates into destruction. Hounded by the society that wants to capture and kill, he is on the run.

== Cast ==
- Mani P. R. as Gulikan
- Remya Valsala as Maathi
- Anumol as Dancer
- Indrans as Moorthy
- Joy Mathew as Rameshan
- Sajitha Madathil as Vagabond
- Vettilakolli Mathi as Mathiyamma
- Abu Valayamkulam as Fishmonger
- Rajeev Vellur as Deputy Ranger
- Nilambur Ayisha as Housemaid
- Suresh Thiruvali as Tea Vendor
- Anil Kumar A. P. as Cook
- Suni R. S. as Kuttichoppan

== Soundtrack ==
Udalaazham

Soundtrack album by Sithara Krishnakumar, Mithun Jayaraj
- Released: 23 February 2018
- Genre: Feature film soundtrack
- Length: 18:21
- Label: Muzik 247

The soundtrack of the film was composed by Sithara Krishnakumar and Mithun Jayaraj. The album consists of 4 tracks featuring lyrics by Manu Manjith and Unnikrishnan Avala. The background score is given by Bijibal.

Track listing
No.	Title	Lyrics	Singer(s)	Length
1.	"Medasooryante (Female Version)"	Unnikrishnan Avala	Sithara Krishnakumar	4:31
2.	"Medasooryante (Male Version)"	Unnikrishnan Avala	Bijibal	3:32
3.	"Puzhayil"	Manu Manjith, Unnikrishnan Avala	Sithara Krishnakumar, Mithun Jayaraj	5:00
4.	"Poomathe Ponnamma"	Unnikrishnan Avala	Jyotsna Radhakrishnan, Pushpavathy	5:08

== Production ==
=== Development ===
Avala, when he began working as a teacher in Nilambur, travelled mostly in buses. He would observe a lot of tribal people during his journeys and began to study them. Their lives and stories which he found interesting led him to make a documentary called Last Page and Womenses. During that time Avala met Raju whom he says was "a woman inside and a man outside." His experiences inspired Avala to write the story of Gulikan, a tribal transgender person whose life was a constant battle against humiliation and abuse by a parochial racist story. Raju was part of the initial discussions of the film and wished to be part of the project. However, he died due to chronic ailments before the film making began.

=== Filming ===
For the lead role of Gulikan, Mani P.R was selected. Mani who had earlier won the 2006 Kerala State Film Award as a Child Actor in his debut feature Photographer, was initially reluctant to take up the role having been disillusioned after facing rejections from the film industry and personal tragedies. It was only after his wife's intervention, he finally accepted the role. Grooming the actor for the role took six months. Mani also helped to translate the script to Paniya language as required by the story.

Three doctors viz, Dr. Manoj K.T, Dr. Rajesh Kumar M.P and Dr. Sajish M because of their passion for cinema, came together and formed the banner Doctors' Dilemma to produce the film. Remya Valsala, Anumol, Indrans, Joy Mathew and Sajitha Madathil were cast in key roles and principal photography began in 2017.

== Reception ==
=== International Film Festivals attended ===
- Mumbai International Film Festival
- International Film Festival of Kerala
- London International Motion Picture Awards
- Indian Film Festival of Melbourne
- Madrid International Film Festival
- The Bangalore Queer Film Festival
