= Pendulum (2023 film) =

Indian film directed by Rejin S. Babu

- Theatrical release poster
- Directed by: Rejin S Babu
- Written by: Rejin S. Babu
- Produced by: Danish K. Asokan; Lisha Joseph; Binoj Villya; Mithuns Money Market
- Starring: Vijay Babu; Anumol; Prakash Bare; Indrans; Shobi Thilakan; Binoj Villya
- Cinematography: Arun Damodaran
- Edited by: Sooraj E. S.
- Music by: Jean P. Johnson
- Production companies: Lights On Cinemas; Bat Bros International; Mithuns Money Market
- Distributed by: Bat Bros International
- Release date: 16 June 2023
- Running time: 106 minutes
- Country: India
- Language: Malayalam

Pendulum is a 2023 Indian Malayalam-language mystery thriller film written and directed by Rejin S. Babu in his directorial debut. The film stars Vijay Babu as Dr. Mahesh Narayan, who sets out to find answers to some strange experiences during a one-day family trip. The cast also includes Ramesh Pisharody, Anumol, Prakash Bare, Indrans, Shobi Thilakan, and Neena Kurup in significant roles.

Principal photography began in January 2021 in Thrissur. The music was composed by Jean P. Johnson, while the cinematography and editing were handled by Arun Damodaran and Sooraj E. S.

Pendulum was released in theatres on 16 June 2023.

== Plot ==
When two children, Amir and Angel, are talking in a dream, an unknown man calls Angel, and suddenly the dream ends. Years later, Antony finds Amir in his truck's trunk in a warehouse, and Alex Ichayan, the warehouse owner, assures Antony that he will get rid of Amir. The next day, Antony finds that Amir hasn't stepped out of the truck, and Alex asks Antony to drop Amir at his destination. Amir says that he lost his memory while attending Kochu Thressia teacher's class and predicts that the truck will hit a person on the way.

At present, Dr. Mahesh Narayan, his wife Shwetha, and daughter Thanmayi shift from Melbourne and settle in Kerala. An old man visits Mahesh in the hospital and requests that he find his missing son. Thinking that he is mentally ill, Mahesh guides him to a psychiatrist. Mahesh goes on a one-day trip to Marayur with his family. He stops the car near a tea shop and tells Shwetha that he has been there before and feels déjà vu. Thanmayi accidentally puts the key inside the trunk, and the car gets center locked. The owner of the tea shop invites Mahesh and his family to stay at his house for the day. At night, Mahesh comes out to make a call and sees the old man who visited him in the hospital. He immediately finds himself in Amir and Angel's dream and gets hit by a truck. The next morning, Shwetha and the tea shop owner see Mahesh lying unconscious outside.

Shwetha thinks that Mahesh had a panic attack and tells her concerns to Dr. Shabnam. Mahesh sees Dr. Jain Joseph and inquires about the old man who visited him. Jain says that Mahesh was sleeping in his chair at that time. Mahesh learns that the truck that hit him was scrapped 15 years ago. Upon Jain's suggestion, Mahesh visits Antony, who tells him about Amir's predictions and that he and his helper Babu couldn't find the person hit by the truck. Jain tells Mahesh to meet John Master, who can give a proper explanation of Mahesh's strange experiences.

John Master explains to Mahesh about lucid dreaming and how Mahesh reached out as an uninvited guest in a dream space shared between two people. Mahesh tells him about two children that appeared in his dream, and John Master tells him to find them. Mahesh meets Kochu Thressia and learns more about Amir and Angel. Through her help, Mahesh finds Angel, who is currently a librarian. Mahesh explains his strange experiences and says that he was a part of Angel and Amir's dream, which Angel thinks is a cooked-up story.

John Master suspects that something happened in between the two periods in Mahesh's dream and asks him to meet Angel to inquire about any dream signs told by Amir. When Mahesh asks Angel whether she remembers any dream signs, Angel suddenly finds herself in a remote location, and Mahesh tells her that she is in a dream. Angel remembers the day when Amir told his dream signs and sees Mahesh there. Amir's father tells him that somebody was with Angel, and suddenly, Angel and Mahesh wake up from their dreams. The next day, Mahesh tells Angel the exact words that Amir told her. John Master thinks that Angel is hiding something.

Mahesh meets Benny, who worked with Angel's father, Joseph. Benny sends Mahesh an old photo of Angel from her childhood. Mahesh enters a dream and asks Angel to recreate memories of her old bungalow. Mahesh enters the recreated bungalow, sees young Angel lying unconscious, and finds a painting of him. He then finds himself in his first dream, where Amir is talking to Angel. Mahesh tells John Master how he provoked Angel to cause harm to Amir. Mahesh realises that John Master is actually Amir, who tells him that the dream will collapse soon and that they will meet soon. Mahesh wakes up near the tea shop and goes through a time loop. He meets Angel again and learns that she injured Amir because someone made her do it. Mahesh later arrives at the place told by Amir and sees his dead body being carried.

== Cast ==
- Vijay Babu as Dr. Mahesh Narayan
- Anumol as Angel
  - Angela as young Angel
- Devaki Rajendran as Shwetha
- Ramesh Pisharody as Dr. jain
- Prakash Bare as John Master/Amir
- Binoj Villya as Amir
  - Amal Dev as young Amir
- Aavani as Thanmayi "Thanu"
- Indrans as Ismail, Amir's father (old man)
- Shaju Sreedhar as Benny
- Biju Sopanam as Stephen, tea shop owner
- Shobi Thilakan as Antony
- Deepu Navaikulam as Babu
- Sunil Sukhada as Alex Isaac
- Neena Kurup as Dr. Shabnam
- Jolly Chirayath as Kochu Thressia teacher
- Aseem Ibrahim as Joseph

== Production ==
Pendulum was the directorial debut of Rejin S. Babu, a native of Koorkenchery. In an interview with an online media, Rejin S. Babu said that he approached numerous actors and told them about the film's story, to which they expressed interest but weren't interested in turning it into a project due to the risk of failure. After hearing the story and subject, Vijay Babu agreed to do the project. The film is produced by Danish K. Asokan, Lisha Joseph, Binoj Villya and Mithun Girishan under the banners of Lights On Cinemas and Bat Bros International. Arun Damodaran and Sooraj E. S. handled the cinematography and editing. Principal photography began in January 2021 in Thrissur. Palakkad and Vagamon were the other filming locations.

== Music ==
Pendulum

Soundtrack album by Jean P. Johnson
- Released: 2023
- Genre: Feature film soundtrack
- Length: 15:09
- Language: Malayalam
- Label: Saregama

The songs were composed by Jean P. Johnson and the lyrics were written by Titto P. Thankachen, Sameer Binsi and Lisha Joseph.

Track listing
No.	Title	Lyrics	Singer(s)	Length
1.	"Athirukal Marayave"	Lisha Joseph	Aravind Dileep Nair, Sadhika KR, Jewel Rose Villya	4:32
2.	"Mayum Kaalangal"	Sameer Binsi	Zulfiq	4:43
3.	"Roohin Nizhale"	Titto P. Thankachen	Najim Arshad	4:54

== Release ==
Pendulum was released in theatres on 16 June 2023. Saina Play acquired the digital rights and began streaming it on 8 December 2023.

== Reception ==
=== Critical response ===
Akhila Menon of OTTPlay gave 2 out of 5 stars and wrote, "Pendulum explores the concepts of lucid dreaming and time travelling, which are new to Malayalam cinema. However, the confused narrative prevents the film from emerging as an interesting watch."
