= Kalki (1984 film) =

- Directed by: N. Sankaran Nair
- Written by: Malayattoor Ramakrishnan
- Screenplay by: Malayattoor Ramakrishnan
- Starring: Adoor Bhasi; Ambika
- Cinematography: Ashok Kumar
- Edited by: Ravi
- Music by: G. Devarajan
- Production company: Chithrachaithanya
- Distributed by: Chithrachaithanya
- Release date: 7 December 1984
- Country: India
- Language: Malayalam

Kalki is a 1984 Indian Malayalam film, directed by N. Sankaran Nair. The film stars Adoor Bhasi and Ambika in the lead roles. The film has musical score by G. Devarajan.

== Cast ==
- Adoor Bhasi
- Ambika
- Mohammed Zaheer

== Soundtrack ==
The music was composed by G. Devarajan and the lyrics were written by Kaniyapuram Ramachandran and Malayattoor Ramakrishnan.

No.	Song	Singers	Lyrics	Length (m:ss)
1	"Antharangappoonkaavanam"	P. Madhuri	Kaniyapuram Ramachandran, Malayattoor Ramakrishnan	
2	"Chithrashalabhame"	Karthikeyan	Kaniyapuram Ramachandran, Malayattoor Ramakrishnan	
3	"Manassum Manchalum"	P. Jayachandran	Kaniyapuram Ramachandran, Malayattoor Ramakrishnan	
4	"Naavaamukundante"	P. Jayachandran	Kaniyapuram Ramachandran, Malayattoor Ramakrishnan	
