= Ponni (1976 film) =

Indian film by Thoppil Bhasi

- Promotional Poster
- Directed by: Thoppil Bhasi
- Screenplay by: Thoppil Bhasi
- Based on: Ponni by Malayattoor Ramakrishnan
- Produced by: M. O. Joseph
- Starring: Kamal Haasan; Lakshmi
- Cinematography: Balu Mahendra
- Edited by: M. S. Mani
- Music by: G. Devarajan
- Production company: Manjilas
- Distributed by: Central Pictures
- Release date: 3 September 1976
- Country: India
- Language: Malayalam

Ponni is a 1976 Indian Malayalam-language film produced by M. O. Joseph under the banner of Manjilas, scripted and directed by Thoppil Bhasi, based on Malayattoor Ramakrishnan's novel of the same name. The film stars Kamal Haasan and Lakshmi, while M. G. Soman, Adoor Bhasi, Sankaradi, Janardhanan and Rajakumari play supporting roles. The film features original songs composed by G. Devarajan, while the cinematography was handled by Balu Mahendra and editing by M. S. Mani. The film was dubbed into Tamil as Kollimalai Maaveeran and Telugu as Kondaraju Koyapilla.

== Plot ==
An Independence Day celebrations organized by the Sub-Collector of the Attappadi area and the participation of various tribal groups of the region. Ponni belonging to the Mudhuga tribe and Maran belonging to the Irula tribe who danced on the day are introduced to each other by the Sub-Collector. Ponni and Maran fall in love at the first sight even as they willingly pose for the media.

These two tribes are rivals, who follow separate faiths and traditions. The Independence Day photograph of Ponni and Maran are published in the newspapers next day. Chellan is in love with Ponni, but she dislikes him. Ponni's friend Maashi loves Chellan.

Tension and strained relations in the Mudhuga tribes is cleverly exploited by the landlords of the area. The tribals practice the Slash-and-burn cultivation method, which is resented by the landlords who needed the tribals as cheap labour. Ponni revolts against the attempts of the landlords to hamper their traditional agricultural activities. Maran also stands by Ponni.

Ponni and Maran love affair is met with widespread animosity and opposition. News is spread that the mountain god and the powers of nature will not be pleased with the inter tribe relationship.

Hanuman is a tool in the hands of the landlords. He works for them against the tribals. The tribal chief (Mooppan) warns the Mudhugas that their settlement will be destroyed by natural calamities if Ponni marries Maran and she is banned from meeting Maran. Meanwhile, Ponni's father Nanjan decides to marry her to Chellan. The police arrest Maran on false charges of holding firearms without a licence. Ponni meets the Sub-Collector and pleads with him to save Maran and manages to get him freed.

The Mudhuga priest Bomman through the influence of the landlords and Hanuman set a trap to kill Ponni. Bomman makes a prediction that the tribal settlement will soon be destroyed by the anger of 'Jakkamma' (the mountain goddess). Pretending to be possessed by the goddess, Bomman demands human sacrifice to appease the powers and save the tribe. Ponni is chosen for the sacrifice and arrangements are made for the ritual. Maran and Chellan reach the spot in time and save Ponni. In the end Maran and Chellan marrying Ponni and Maashi respectively.

== Cast ==
- Kamal Haasan as Maran
- Lakshmi as Ponni
- M. G. Soman as Chellan
- Adoor Bhasi as Bomman
- Sankaradi as Nanjan
- Bahadoor as Adhikari (Village officer)
- Kunjan as Village officer's assistant
- Janardhanan as sub-collector
- Paravoor Bharathan as Hanuman
- Manavalan Joseph as Sankaran
- Sam(A.T.Samuel) as Aandhi
- Muthukulam Raghavan Pillai as Mooppan
- J. A. R. Anand as Mooppan's assistant
- Rajakumari as Maashi
- K. P. A. C. Lalitha as Chikki
- Pala Thankam as Chelli
- Prathapachandran as Chinnan
- Punjabi as tea-shop keeper
- C. A. Balan as Bhandari
- E. Madhavan as Muthalali

== Production ==
The film is based on Malayattoor Ramakrishnan's famous novel titled Ponni. The novel was written in 1966-67 and was inspired by true stories that Malayattoor heard when he worked as Ottappalam sub-collector during 1959 - 1961. The film was written and directed by Thoppil Bhasi, produced by M. O. Joseph under the banner of Manjilas Cine enterprises. Cinematography was handled by Balu Mahendra, editing by M. S. Mani, and choreographed by E. Madhavan. The film was shot in forest area of Palakkad. Shooting locations included Satya, Gemini, AVM and Karpakam Studios in Madras (now Chennai). The final length of the film was 3,589.32 metres (11,776.0 ft).

== Soundtrack ==
External audio
- Video Song Jukebox(Tamil) on YouTube

=== Malayalam Version ===
The music was composed by G. Devarajan with lyrics by P. Bhaskaran.

No.	Song	Singers	Lyrics	Length (m:ss)
1	"Kaaveri Thalakkaaveri"	P. Leela, P. Madhuri, C. O. Anto	P. Bhaskaran	
2	"Maamaramo Poomaramo"	P. Madhuri	P. Bhaskaran	
3	"Maargazhiyil Mallika"	K. J. Yesudas	P. Bhaskaran	
4	"Maattupponkal"	P. Jayachandran, P. Leela, P. Madhuri, Chorus, Srikanth	P. Bhaskaran	
5	"Neeraattu Ponkal Neeraattu"	P. Susheela, Chorus	P. Bhaskaran	
6	"Ponnee Ponnee"	P. Madhuri, Chorus	P. Bhaskaran	
7	"Sinkarappenninte"	P. Leela, P. Madhuri	P. Bhaskaran	
8	"Thenkaashi"	P. Jayachandran, P. Leela, P. Madhuri, Sreekanth	P. Bhaskaran	

=== Tamil Version ===
Tamil lyrics were written by Deva Narayanan. The playback singers are Sherin Peter, Sasirekha, T. R. Sarojarani and Harimathavan.

No.	Song	Singers
1	"Azhagana Thenmalai Mele Padavantha Penne"	
2	"Pamparamo Penn Manamo"	
3	"Yamma Ho Yamma, cauvery"	
4	"Sinthatha Muthukkal"	
5	"Neerattu Pongal Neerattu"	
6	"Maanganiyai Paarkum Pothey"	

== Release ==
Ponni was released on 3 September 1976. The film was dubbed into Tamil under the title Kollimalai Maaveeran and Telugu as Kondaraju Koyapilla.
