= Ponni (novel) =

Malayalam Novel

- Author: Malayattoor Ramakrishnan
- Original title: പൊന്നി
- Language: Malayalam
- Genre: Novel
- Publisher: Sahityapravarthaka Sahakaranasangham; D. C. Books
- Publication date: 1967
- Publication place: India
- Pages: 317
- OCLC: 19560133

Ponni is a Malayalam novel written by Malayattoor Ramakrishnan in 1967. It is based on the lifestyle of Adivasis of Attappady at Malleswaram Hills of Mannarkkad.

== Film adaptation ==
A 1976 film adaptation titled Ponni starred Kamal Haasan and Lakshmi. The film was shot in forest areas of Palakkad and at Satya, Gemini, AVM, and Karpakam Studios.
