= Malayattoor Ramakrishnan =

Indian writer

- Born: K. V. Ramakrishna Iyer; 27 May 1927; Kalpathi, Malabar District, Madras Presidency, British India
- Died: 27 December 1997 (aged 70); Thiruvananthapuram, Kerala, India
- Occupations: Novelist; Short story writer; IAS Officer; Cartoonist
- Spouse: Krishnaveni (1954–1997)
- Children: 2
- Parents: K.S. Viswanatha Iyer; Janaki Ammal
- Relatives: Jayaram (nephew)
- Writing career
- Notable works: Yanthram; Verukal; Yakshi; Service Story
- Notable awards: 1967 Kerala Sahitya Akademi Award for Novel; 1979 Vayalar Award

K. V. Ramakrishna Iyer, better known by his pen name Malayattoor Ramakrishnan (27 May 1927 – 27 December 1997), was an Indian writer of Malayalam literature, cartoonist, lawyer, judicial magistrate, and Indian Administrative Service (IAS) officer. He was best known for his novels, short stories and biographical sketches and his works include Yanthram, Verukal, Yakshi and Service Story – Ente IAS Dinangal. He received the Kerala Sahitya Akademi Award for Novel in 1967. He was also a recipient of the Vayalar Award in 1979.

== Biography ==
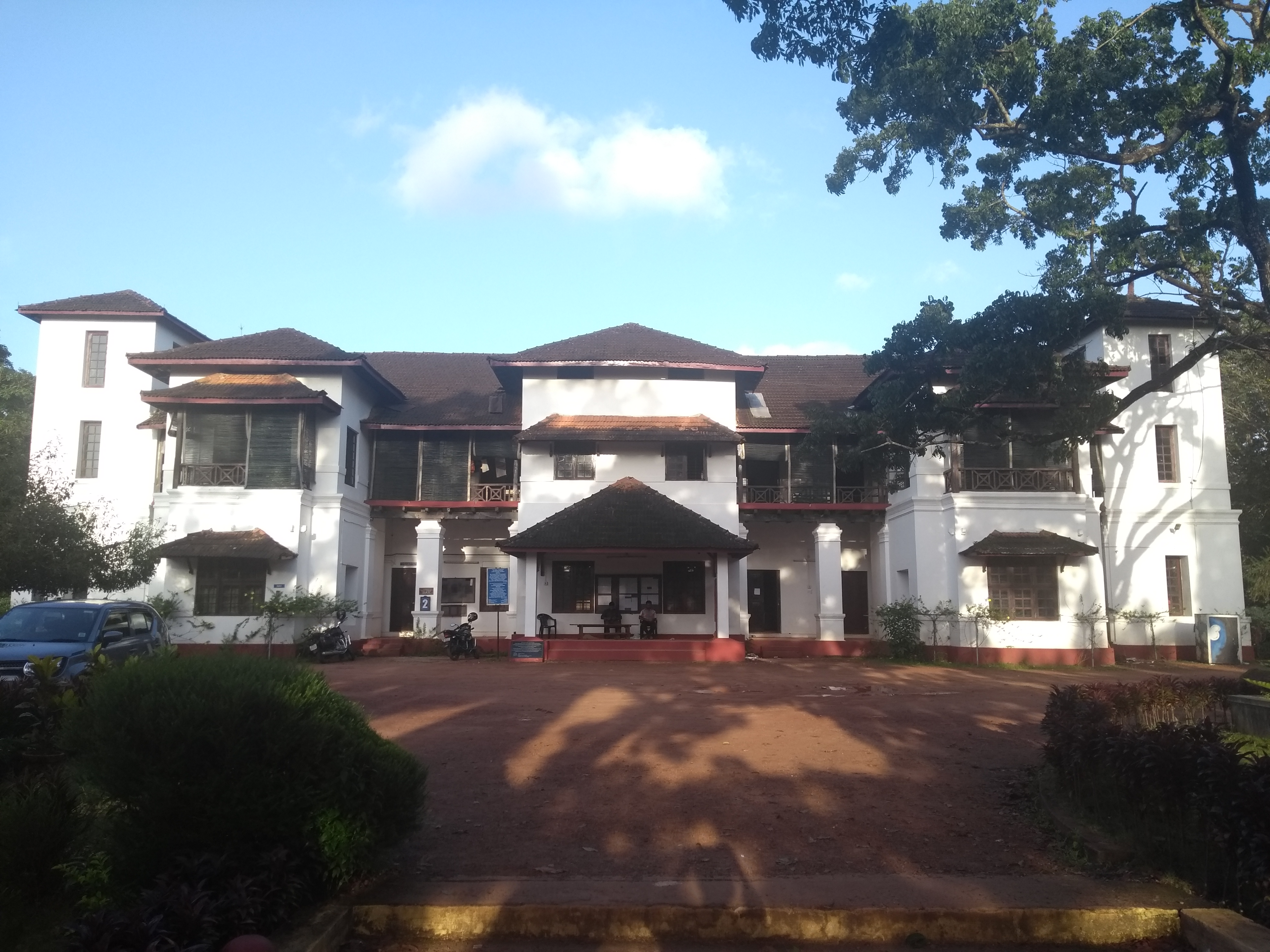
UC College, Ramakrishnan's alma mater and workplace

Malayattoor Ramakrishnan was born on 27 May 1927, at Kalpathi, a village renowned for Kalpathi Ratholsavam, in Palakkad to K.R. Viswanatha Iyer, a government official, and his wife, Janaki Ammal, as one of their six children. The family later settled down in Thottuva, near Cheranallur, near the banks of the Periyar River. His schooling was at various schools in Kerala, traveling with his father whose work carried him to many places in the state and he started his college education at Union Christian College, Aluva where he had the opportunity to study under the known critic, Kuttipuzha Krishna Pillai. It was during this period, he participated in the Indian independence movement for which he was incarcerated for a week. Later, he graduated from the University College Thiruvananthapuram and worked as a tutor at his alma mater, Union Christian College, Aluva, for a while.

Later, Ramakrishnan studied law and earned his degree in law to start practicing as a lawyer but moved to Mumbai to join Free Press Journal as an assistant editor where he worked along T. J. S. George. Later, he returned to Kerala to resume his career as a lawyer; it was during this time he unsuccessfully contested the 1954 elections to the Kerala Legislative Assembly from Perumbavoor assembly constituency. Subsequently, he returned to Mumbai for another stint as the sub editor of Free Press Journal when he started writing short articles in their evening bulletin but the stay in Mumbai was again short as he went back to Kerala. Soon, he passed the Municipal Commissioner's examination but could not get a job due to his leaning towards the leftist ideology. However, he passed the Sub-magistrate's examination with a first rank to join the legal services and while working as a sub magistrate, he passed the civil services examination to join the Indian Administrative Service in 1957. He served in various positions during administrative service career until he resigned from service to concentrate on writing.

Ramakrishnan was married to Krishnaveni in 1954. He died on 27 December 1997, at Thiruvananthapuram, at the age of 70, survived by his wife and two children. His wife outlived him by two years and died in 1999. Jayaram, noted Malayalam film actor, is his nephew.

== Legacy ==
Besides his administrative career, Ramakrishnan's contributions cover the fields of journalism, literature, cartoons and films. While working as a sub-editor in The Free Press Journal in Mumbai, he was also a contributing cartoonist to Shankar's Weekly. His literary career started with detective fiction when he wrote a crime novel, Raathri. He also translated a few Sherlock Holmes novels as well as Dracula into Malayalam, his was the first Malayalam translation of Bram Stoker's novel.

Malayattoor Ramakrishnan wrote the award winning novel, Verukal (Roots) in 1965, a semi-autobiographical work which tells the story of a family of Tamil speaking Iyers who settled in Kerala. The novel was later translated into English by V. Abdulla and published by Orient Longman. Two years later, he published Ponni (1967), which was based on the lifestyle of Adivasis of Attappady at Malleswaram Hills. In 1981, he resigned from the Indian Administrative Service to concentrate more on writing and it was during the period from 1981 to 1997 that his more famous works, viz. Yakshi, Yanthram, Nettoor Mathom and Amritham Thedi, were written. Aaraam Viral was the last of his novels, which he wrote three years before his death; the work has also been translated into English under the title The Sixth Finger by Prema Jayakumar. He also wrote Service Story – Ente IAS Dinangal, which documents his memoirs of his career as a bureaucrat.

Ramakrishnan entered the film industry in 1968 with Lakshaprabhu, a P. Bhaskaran film, for which he provided the story, screenplay and dialogues. Overall, he wrote the screenplay and dialogues for four more films such as Chayam, Gayathri, Panchami and Kalki and another six films viz. Yakshi, Chembarathi, Ponni, Sharapanjaram, Iyer the Great and Akam were based on his story. He was also the director of the 1982 movie, Odukkam Thudakkam, produced by M. O. Joseph which was based on his own story and he himself wrote the screenplay and dialogues for the film. Two film songs have been written by him, one for his directorial venture, Odukkam Thudakkam and the other for the movie, Kalki.

== Awards and honours ==
Kerala Sahitya Akademi selected Verukal for their annual award for novels in 1967. He received the Vayalar Award in 1979 for the novel, Yanthram. Malayatoor Ramakrishnan Charitable Trust, an eponymous charitable organization, have instituted two awards, the Malayattoor Painting and Sculpture Award for recognising excellence in fine arts and the Malayattoor Award for honouring literary excellence in Malayalam language. M. V. Devan, the noted painter and sculptor, was one among the many recipients of the Malayattoor Painting and Sculpture Award while Prabha Varma, T. D. Ramakrishnan and Perumbadavam Sreedharan feature among the literary award winners.

== Bibliography ==
=== Novels ===
- Ramakrishnan, Malayatoor (1964). Doctor Vezhambal. Vaidehi publications & features, Thiruvananthapuram: Vaidehi publications & features, Tvm.
- Ramakrishnan Malayattur (1966). Verukal. Kottayam: Sahithyapravarthakasaharakaransangam.
- Ramakrishnan, Malayattur (1996). Yakshi. Kottayam: D.C.Books. ISBN 9788171305001.
- Ramakrishnan, Malayattoor (1967). Ponni. Kottayam, DCB.
- Ramakrishnan, Malayattoor (1970). Dwandwayuddham.
- Ramakrishnan, Malayattoor (1976). Yanthram.
- Ramakrishnan, Malayattur (1988). Ananthayaathra. Kottayam: D.C.Books.
- Ramakrishnan, Malayattur. Nettoormadam. Kottayam: National Book Stall.
- Ramakrishnan, Malayattoor (1989). Mrthiyude kavaadam.
- Ramakrishnan, Malayattoor (1994). Aaraam viral. Kottayam, DCB.
- Ramakrishnan, Malayattoor (1988). Svaraṃ. DC Books. ISBN 9788171300037.
- Mukthichakram
- Ramakrishnan, Malayattoor (1986). Manassile maanikyam. Kottayam, SPCS.
- Ramakrishnan, Malayattur (1985). Amrutam thedi. Kottayam: National Book Stall.
- Ramakrishnan Malayattur (1969). Anju Cent. Sahithya Pra. Co. s: Sahithya Pra. Co. s.
- Ramakrishnan, Malayattoor (1981). Thudakkam Odukkam.
- Ramakrishnan, Malayattoor (1983). Rakthachandanam. Kottayam, Current.
- Rathri (Night)
- Ramakrishnan, Malayattoor (1980). Mridula Prabhu. Kottayam, Current.
- Malayattoor Ramakrishnan (1999). Sirassil Varachathu. Kottayam: DC Books.
- Vishabeejam
- Ramakrishnan, Malayattoor (1990). Challikozhi. Kozhikode, Poorna.
- Ramakrishnan, Malayattoor (1999). Grahanam. DC Books. ISBN 9788171309054.

=== Short stories ===
- Aadyatthe Kesu (First Case, 1952)
- Avakashi (Heir, 1956)
- Soochimukhi (One with a Needle-face, 1957)
- Verukalkkoranubandham
- Ramakrishnan, Malayattur. Brigadier Kathakal. Kottayam: National Book Stall.
- Ramakrishnan, Malayattoor (1987). Brigadierum Penmarukum.
- Ramakrishnan, Malayattoor (1991). Brigadierude thirichuvaravu.
- Ramakrishnan, Malayattoor (1999). Brigadierum papparaasikalum. Kottayam, D C Books. ISBN 9788171309061.
- Ramakrishnan Malayattur (1976). Thiranjedutha Kathakal. National Book Stall, Kottayam: National Book Stall.
- Arabiyum Ottakavum (The Arab and the Camel)
- Malayāt̲t̲ūr Rāmakr̥ṣṇan (1963). Paṛakkunna taḷika.
- Naalu Anju (Four Five)
- Malayāt̲t̲ūr Rāmakr̥ṣṇan (1963). Malabār Hilluṃ Phor̲as Rōaḍuṃ. Mangalodayaṃ.
- Ramakrishnan, Malayattur (1957). Pambu. Mangalodayam: Mangalodayam.
- Ramakrishnan, Malayattoor (1999). Athiril poothuninna marangal. Kottayam, D C Books. ISBN 9788126400102.
- Ramakrishnan, Malayattoor (2012). Kaliyamardhanam. Kozhikode: Poorna publications. ISBN 9788130001340.
- Ramakrishnan, Malayattoor (1985). Verukalkku oru anubandham.
- Ramakrishnan, Malayattoor. Neela Kurujni Poothappol.
- Ramakrishnan, Malayattoor (2016). Collector. Kozhikode: Poorna Publications. ISBN 978-8130001234.
- Malayāt̲t̲ūr Rāmakr̥ṣṇan (2000). Haṃsanuṃ Valsanuṃ: Case Diary. Kar̲ant̲ Buks. ISBN 978-81-240-0913-0.
- Sputnikum Gotti Thomasum
- Sherlock Holmes Kathakal

=== Others ===
- Ramakrishnan Malayattur (1996). Ormmakalude Album. Thiruvananthapuram. Marghi Publications: Tvm. Marghi Publications.
- Ramakrishnan, Malayatoor (1986). Service Story: Ente IAS Dinangal. Kottayam: Sahitya Pravarthaka Co-operative Society.
- Ramakrishnan Malayattur (1958). Nammude Sikshaniyamam. Parishathu.

=== Translations from other languages ===
- Manjamukham (Translation)

Original Title :- The Adventure of the Yellow Face by Sir Arthur Conan Doyle

- Nadodikkappalil Nalumasam (Translation)

=== Translations into other languages ===
- Ramakrishnan Malayatoor; V. Abdulla (translator) (2002). Roots. Hyderabad: Orient longman. ISBN 9788125022206.
- Ramakrishnan Malayatoor; V. Abdulla (translator) (1995). Roots. Penguin Books India. ISBN 9780140255614.
- Ramakrishnan Malayatoor; R. Viswanathan (translator) (1998). Five Cents of Land. Penguin Books India. ISBN 9780140272185.

== Films ==
=== Direction ===
- Odukkam Thudakkam

=== Screenplay and dialogues ===
- Lakshaprabhu
- Chayam
- Gayathri
- Panchami
- Kalki
- Odukkam Thudakkam

=== Story ===
- Lakshaprabhu
- Chayam
- Gayathri
- Panchami
- Kalki
- Odukkam Thudakkam
- Yakshi
- Chembarathi
- Ponni
- Sarapancharam
- Iyer the Great
- Akam
