= Sajitha Madathil =

Indian actress

- Born: Kozhikode
- Occupations: Film and theatre actor
- Children: Aaromal
- Parent(s): Chandrasekhar Menon, Savithri
- Relatives: Sabitha Sekhar (sibling)

Sajitha Madathil is an Indian film actress, theatre artist. playwright, academic, documentary producer, and cultural administrator known for her pioneering work in Malayalam theatre and Malayalam cinema. She has acted in over 50 films, performed in more than 40 theatre productions, written notable plays, and served in key cultural institutions across India. She is also a recipient of multiple state awards for acting, playwriting, and theatre scholarship.

Her performance in Joy Mathew's feature film Shutter (2012) won her the Kerala State film award for second best actress. She appeared in the feature films Shutter in 2012, in Adimadhyantham (Beginning, Middle and End) in 2011, and in Shalini Usha Nair's feature film Akam (The Interior) in 2011.

== Career ==
Sajitha Madathil had been a Deputy Secretary, Sangeet Natak Akademi New Delhi (Academy of Music and Dance, India, an autonomous body under the Ministry of Culture, Government of India) till 2014. She had also worked as the Deputy Director, Kerala Chalachithra Academy(Academy of Motion Pictures, Kerala State), Documentation Officer/Documentary Producer with Other Media Communications, New Delhi and Producer with Kairali TV, India. She is also a faculty cum theatre expert at National Institute of Integrated learning and management, New Delhi. She was the head of the department of Acting at the K. R. Narayanan National Institute of Visual Science and Arts (KRNNIVSA), an autonomous institute established by the Government of Kerala.

Madathil holds a Doctor of Philosophy in Performing Arts from the School of Arts and Aesthetics, Jawaharlal Nehru University (2023), where her research examined social subjectivities in Indian theatre through a Malayalam case study of actress narratives. She completed an M.Phil. in Theatre Studies from Mahatma Gandhi University (1997–1999) and an M.A. in Drama (Acting) from Rabindra Bharati University (1992–1994). She has been selected for the KCHR Thematic Post Doctoral Fellowship for the year 2025–26.

== Activism ==
Sajitha was introduced into theatre through the street plays (Kala Jatha) of Kerala Sasthra Sahithya Parishad (KSSP) and performances for various women's groups in Kerala, India. KSSP is the renowned social and people's science movement in Kerala which used to propagate its vision and ideas through theatre.

== Theatre ==
She has been active in the Malayalam (Kerala) theatre and feminist discourse for more than two decades. Sajitha Madathil is one of the founders of Abhinethri (Actress), the first women's theatre group in Kerala, formed to explore the potential and possibilities of women's expressions. Sajitha has been associated with Kerala theatre from 1987. She has been involved in more than 20 productions as an actress, and also directed two solo performances and scripted 3 plays - Matsyaganddhi, Chanki-Chankaran Family Reality Show and Mother's Day. The major plays that featured her are: 1. Muditheyyam(1991) – A solo performance on the experience of a woman who refuses to tie her hair. The play is an adaptation of the short story written by distinguished feminist writer and activist, Professor Sara Joseph. 2. Aashad ki Ek Din (1993) – Malayalam adaptation of the Hindi play by Mohan Rakesh. 3. Radha (1994) – Play by eminent Malayalam playwright G. Sankarapillai. 4. Bharatavakyam (1994) - Play by eminent Malayalam playwright G. Sankarapillai. 5. Chirakadiyochakal (1995) - The first play of Abhinethri. The lead characters in this play try to question the given womanhood of the mothers of Karna, the legendary character in the epic Mahabharatha. It also throws light in to the prevalent expectation of body language from actresses. Sajitha played the lead role in the three-member group that conceived, scripted, directed and produced this play. 6. Beauty Parlour (1999) – The play celebrates the human nature to beautify oneself and narrates the pain when beautification becomes essential for survival due to commodification of the body. This play was first staged at the National Women's Theatre Festival at Thrissur, Kerala, organised by the Kerala Sangeetha Nataka Academy (Kerala Music and Drama Academy). Later it was performed all over Kerala including the Young Feminists Conference of India, held in Hyderabad in 2001. 7. Matsyaganddhi (2002) – Scripted, directed and acted in this solo performance that traces the life situations and challenges of the fisher-women in Kerala. This play was performed in Thiruvananthapuram, Kerala and in Cape Town, South Africa. The script of this play has been published in Indian Literature, the journal of Sahitya Akademi – the National Academy of Letters, India. It is also part of curriculum at different universities in Kerala. 8. Guardians of the Deep (2002) – Acted in this play, whose cast were drawn from the seven continents of the world. The play celebrates the existence, voices and the views of local fisher-people around the world. British director John Martin directed this play that was produced by Theatre for Africa. The Performances were held in Cape Town and Johannesburg during the Earth Summit in Johannesburg. 9. Water Play (2002) – Acted in this play based on an African folk story, which was directed by Nicholas Ellenbogen of Theatre for Africa, and staged in Johannesburg with Zimbabwean actors. The play narrates the importance of water, the life giver. 10. Mathilukal (2008)-Acted in this play by Promod Payyanur produced by Swaralaya, Palghat, Kerala. 11. Spinal Code(2010) Acted in this play directed by Deepan Shivaraman and produced by Oxygen theatre Company. 12.Kali Natakam (2016) Sripted and acted in this play directed by Chandradasan and produced by Lokadharmi, Eranakulam

== TV/Video productions ==
Sajitha Madathil had worked as a producer in Kairali TV, a Malayalam Satellite Channel, from 2000 to 2002. During this tenure, she had conceived, co-ordinated and directed 75 episodes of a weekly magazine titled Penmalayalam (Malayali Women) on women's issues and performance tradition. She received Three state awards for Documentary Making. For Public Relations Department, Government of Kerala she directed a documentary on P K Medini—Maattathinte pattukari (The Minstrel of Change) in 2011 with duration of 42min.

== Publication ==
Sajitha has been actively writing on Kerala theater for last few years. She received Kerala Sangeet Natak Akademi Award for Best book of the year for her first book on history of Women in Malayalam Theatre (Malayala Nadaka Sthree Charithram) Kozhikode: Mathrubhumi Publishing House, 2010. M K Kamalam, A Biography published by Kerala State Chalachithra Academy, Trivandrum: 2010. Aranginte Vakabedangal, (Shades of Theatre) Kottayam: DC Books, 2013. Neelakkuyil: Miss Kumariyude Chalachithrajeevitham Kerala State Chalachithra Academy, Trivandrum: 2020. Arangile Matsyagandhikal, Green Books, Trichur: 2019. Autobiography Vellivelichavum Veyilnaalangalum Kottayam: DC Books, 2025 and For the Love of Art, The Lost History of Women in Kerala Theatre by Sajitha madathil, Translated from Malayalam by Jayasree Kalathil, published by Penguin Random House India Pvt. Ltd, 2025 She blogs at Matsyaganddhi

== Awards and nominations ==
- 2013 - Kerala State Film Award for Second Best Actress - "Shutter"
- Kerala State Sangeet Natak Akademi Award for Best Theatre Book 2010
- Kerala State Television Award for best current affairs programme in 2000
- Best Children's Documentary Award by the Kerala State Council for Child Welfare, in 2000.
- Kerala Film Critics Award for Best Documentary in 2001
- 2013 – Asiavision Awards – Best Supporting Actress
- 2015-Kanal-Vayala Puraskaram for the contribution to Malayalam Theatre
- 2015-Filmfare Awards South- Best Supporting Actress-Nominated (Njaan)
- 2019 - Kerala Sangeetha Nataka Akademi Award

== Filmography ==
Year	Title	Role	Notes
1999	Pachakkuthira		Children's Film
2000	Kaboolivala		Telefilm
2002	Nizhalkuthu		
2003	Thuruthu		Short film
2010	Indoor		Short film
2010	Janaki	Mother	Children's Film
2011	Adimadhyantham		
2011	Veeraputhran	Amina	
2012	Ee Adutha Kaalathu	Madhuri's mother	
2012	Ivan Megharoopan	Gomathi Teacher	
2013	Shutter	Thankam	Winner :- Kerala State Film Award for Second Best Actress
2013	Akam	Seetha	
2013	Idukki Gold	Shyamala	
2013	Nadan	Sudharma	
2013	Swapaanam	Kuttan's wife	
2014	Ottamantharam	Neela	
2014	Njan	Kujooli	
2014	Varsham	Omana	
2015	The Reporter	Manoj's wife	
2015	Nilam	Mother	Short film
2015	Rani Padmini	Lalithamma	
2015	Thilothama	Molly	
2016	Ithu Thaanda Police	SCPO Lathika	
2016	Mohavalayam	Madhaviyakkan	
2016	Hallelooya	Roy's mother	
2016	Kismath	Warden	
2016	Shyam	Rajamma	
2017	Pareeth Pandari	Hauvva Beevi	
2017	Hadiya		
2017	Nilavariyathe		
2017	HOT(Hell Of a Trip)		Short film
2017	Ma	Manu's mother	Short film
2018	Khaleefa		
2018	Koode	School teacher	
2018	Chandragiri	Selin teacher	
2019	Virus	Doctor Sreedevi	
2019	Kunjiramanate Kuppayam	Kunjiraman's wife	
2019	Makkana	Seetha	
2019	Udalaazham	Vagabond	
2019	Mamangam	Karumari	
2019	Stand up	Maria	
2019	Smell	Maria	Short film
2021	Vari : The Sentence		
2022	Pada	Padmini Ramachandran	
2022	Paappan	Kathrina Puthenpuraykal	
2022	Kaapa	Muhammad Nazir's mother	
2023	B 32 Muthal 44 Vare		
2023	Amala		
2023	King of Kotha	Kalikutty	
2023	Family		
2025	Narayaneente Moonnaanmakkal	Jayasree	
2025	Yuva Sapnon Ka Safar	Nun	Multilingual Anthology series Segment: Backstage
2025	Ambalamukkile Visheshangal †	TBA	
TBA	Viral Sebi †	Rajeesha	
TBA	Aanu †	TBA	

== Television ==
Year	Title	Role	Channel	Notes
2024-2025	Manathe Kottaram	Chandrika Madhavan	Zee Keralam	Replaced by Shobha Mohan
