= Chayilyam =

- Directed by: Manoj Kana
- Written by: Manoj Kana
- Starring: Anumol; M. R. Gopakumar
- Cinematography: K. G. Jayan
- Edited by: Manoj Kannoth
- Music by: Chandran Veyattummal
- Production company: Neru Films
- Release date: 31 January 2014
- Running time: 127 minutes
- Country: India
- Language: Malayalam

Chayilyam is a 2014 Indian Malayalam-language film written and directed by Manoj Kana. The story is about the plight of a hapless widow, whom society denies the freedom to lead a normal life. The film was produced with contributions from more than 2,000 individuals and released in theatres in February 2014. The film received positive responses at film festivals.

== Cast ==
- Anumol as Gowry
- M. R. Gopakumar

== Awards ==
- Hassan Kutty Award for Best Debut Indian Film at the International Film Festival of Kerala (2012)
- Kerala State Film Award for Best Story (2012)
- Padmarajan Award for Best Film (2012)
