= Punaradhivasam =

- Directed by: V. K. Prakash
- Written by: P. Balachandran
- Produced by: N. P. Prakash; V. K. Prakash
- Starring: Nandita Das; Manoj K. Jayan
- Cinematography: Ravi K. Chandran
- Music by: Sivamani; Louis Banks
- Release date: 2000
- Country: India
- Language: Malayalam

Punaradhivasam (transl. Rehabilitation) is a 2000 Indian Malayalam-language drama film directed by V. K. Prakash and written by P. Balachandran, starring Nandita Das and Manoj K. Jayan. This film won the National Film Award for Best Feature Film in Malayalam, Kerala State Film Award for Best Debut Director and Kerala State Film Award for Best Story.

== Plot ==
The story follows a family in which a father and his son, Sudhakaran, have a difficult relationship. They care about each other, but neither knows how to show affection or speak openly about his feelings. Years of poor communication have created distance and misunderstanding between them. Sudhakaran is married to Savithri, but their marriage also becomes troubled. Shalini, who comes from a family where love and feelings are expressed more openly, becomes involved in their lives. Shalini had earlier been in a relationship with Biju, but her relationship with him does not continue. As the relationships change, Sudhakaran begins living with Shalini, leaving Savithri caught in an increasingly painful situation.

The story moves between these relationships as old problems and unspoken feelings come into the open. Shalini tries to deal with the emotional distance within Sudhakaran's family, while Sudhakaran struggles with his father, his marriage, and the changes in his own life. Savithri is deeply affected by the breakdown of her relationship with Sudhakaran and eventually dies by suicide. Her death changes the course of the story and forces Sudhakaran to face what has happened. The conflicts involving Sudhakaran, Shalini, Savithri, Biju, and Sudhakaran's father gradually come together as the characters deal with the consequences of their choices and failed relationships.

Toward the end, Sudhakaran is left facing the losses and unresolved problems that have followed him. The story returns to his troubled emotional life and his relationship with the people around him rather than giving every conflict a simple solution. In the final sequence, Sudhakaran experiences a visual pseudohallucination, bringing the story to its closing image.

== Cast ==
- Nandita Das as Shalini
- Manoj K. Jayan as Sudhakaran
- P. Balachandran as Sudhakaran's father
- Lalu Alex as Biju
- Praveena as Savithri
- Sai Kumar
- Bindu Ramakrishnan
- Prakash Varma (uncredited extra)

== Awards ==
- 2000 National Film Award for Best Feature Film in Malayalam
- 2000 Kerala State Film Award for Best Debut Director
- 2000 Kerala State Film Award for Best Story
