= Yakshi (film) =

- Poster
- Directed by: K. S. Sethumadhavan
- Screenplay by: Thoppil Bhasi
- Based on: Yakshi by Malayattoor Ramakrishnan
- Produced by: M. O. Joseph
- Starring: Sathyan; Sharada
- Cinematography: Melli Irani
- Edited by: M. S. Mani
- Music by: Devarajan
- Production company: Manjilas
- Distributed by: Vimala Release
- Release date: 30 June 1968
- Country: India
- Language: Malayalam

Yakshi is a 1968 Malayalam-language psychological thriller film, directed by K. S. Sethumadhavan and written by Thoppil Bhasi, based on Malayattoor Ramakrishnan's novel of the same name. The film stars Sathyan, Sharada, Adoor Bhasi, N. Govindan Kutty, Bahadoor, Ushakumari, Sukumari, Rajakokila and Radhika. It is considered by historians to be the first psychological thriller in Malayalam cinema.

== Plot ==
Sreenivasan is a college lecturer doing research on the unscientific and superstitious topic of the Yakshis. He is disfigured in an accident in his college lab. Everyone who adored him begins to shum him for his looks. He meets a beautiful woman, Ragini. She is willing to accept him despite his disfigurement. Sreenivasan marries Ragini and they lead a happy life. After a while, Sreenivasan has doubts about the identity of his wife; he suspects that she is a Yakshi. He dreams that Ragini wants to murder him to gain immortality by drinking his blood. Sreenivasan allows her to take his life, but because of the strong passion and love towards him, Ragini lets him live and disappears. When Sreenivasan wakes up from the dream, policemen take him to a psychiatrist on the basis of the missing of Ragini and Sreenivasan's retarded behaviour. Sreenivasan tells them cops that, Ragini is a Yakshi and disappeared in front of him. But no one believes him. The psychiatrist reveals to the cops that, Sreenivasan is mentally ill because of his constant thoughts about Yakshis. He confesses that he murdered Ragini while she was dressing up due to his mental illness.

== Cast ==
- Sharada as Ragini, Sreenivasan's beautiful wife
- Sathyan as Professor Sreenivasan (Sreeni)
- Sreelatha Namboothiri as Vanaja
- Adoor Bhasi as Ananthan
- Sukumari as Kalyani
- Bahadoor as Paramu
- N. Govindankutty as Chandran
- Radhika
- Rajakokila as Chandran's Wife
- Ushakumari as Vijayalakshmi

== Soundtrack ==
The music was composed by G. Devarajan and the lyrics were written by Vayalar Ramavarma.

Song	Singers
"Chandrodayathile"	S. Janaki
"Chandrodayathile"	K. J. Yesudas, S. Janaki
"Padmaraagappadavukal"	P. Susheela
"Swarnachaamaram Veeshiyethunna"	K. J. Yesudas, P. Leela
"Swarnachaamaram" (F)	P. Leela
"Vilichu Njan Vilikettu"	P. Susheela
