= Yakshi (novel) =

1967 novel by Malayattoor Ramakrishnan

- Author: Malayattoor Ramakrishnan
- Language: Malayalam
- Genre: Literature Novel
- Published: 1967 (D.C. Books)
- Publication place: India
- ISBN: 81-7130-500-8

Yakshi is a Malayalam novel written by Malayattoor Ramakrishnan in 1967. The novel follows a college lecturer, Srinivasan, who is disfigured in an accident in his college lab. He meets a beautiful woman who is willing to accept him despite his disfigurement. But after a while, Srinivasan begins to doubt that the woman is not all she appears - or even human. In 1968, the novel was adapted into a film with same name starring Sathyan. In 1993, Yakshi was shown in BBC's Off the Shelf program as 12 episodes. In 1995, Hema Malini directed a telefilm in Hindi for Zee TV titled Mohini with Sudesh Berry and Madhoo. In 2013, a contemporary retelling of the novel titled Akam was released.

== Plot ==
Yakshi narrates the story of Srinivasan, a young handsome scientist and lecturer, who is working in a college in Kerala. Srinivasan is doing research on the Yakshis (Vampire). He is in love with Vijayalakshmi, one of the students at the college.

In the chemistry laboratory, he is met with an unexpected accident, leaving almost half of his face damaged. Everyone who used to adore him begins to hate him and avoids him because of his disfigurement. Even Vijayalakshmi deserts him. He is thus infected by an intense inferiority complex and experiences mental trauma.

A mysterious woman, Ragini, befriends Srini and despite his damaged face, begins to love him. Srini marries Ragini. Eventually, he starts to question whether Ragini is human or a ghost

== Main characters ==
- Srinivasan - the protagonist
- Ragini - Srinivasan's wife/mysterious woman
- Chandrasekharan - Srinivasan's best friend
- Anandan - Srinivasan's neighbour
- Vjayalakshmi - Srinivasan's ex-girlfriend
- Vanaja - Srinivasan's student
- Kalyaniamma - Anandan's wife
- Karthyayaniamma- Anandan's servant
- Thankam - Chandrasekharan's wife
- Professor Kurup - Sreenivasan's colleague
