= P. Balachandran =

Indian actor and director (1952–2021)

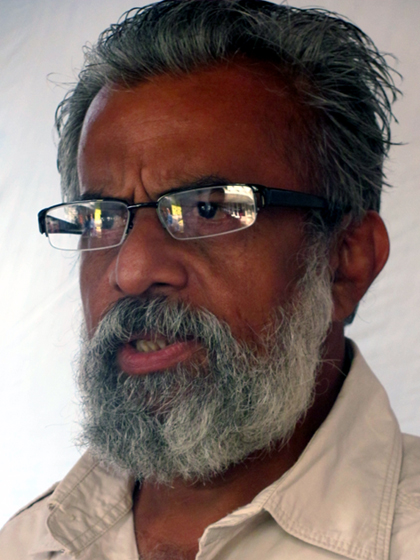
- Born: Padmanabhan Balachandran Nair; 2 February 1952; Sasthamkotta, Kollam, Kerala, India
- Died: 5 April 2021 (aged 69); Vaikom, Kerala, India
- Education: Devaswom Board College, Sasthamkotta; School of Drama and Fine Arts, Thrissur
- Occupations: Playwright; screenwriter; actor; director; professor
- Spouse: Sreelatha
- Children: 2
- Parents: Padmanabha Pillai; Saraswati Bhai
- Awards: Kerala Sahitya Akademi Award

Padmanabhan Balachandran Nair (2 February 1952 – 5 April 2021) was an Indian writer, playwright, scenarist, director, and actor. He was known for his work in Malayalam literature and Malayalam cinema.

== Career ==
Balachandran is best known for the play Paavam Usman for which he won the Kerala Sahitya Akademi Award and Kerala Professional Nataka Award in the year 1989. He has scripted many films including Ulladakkam (1991), Pavithram (1994), Agnidevan (1995), Punaradhivasam (2000), and Kammatti Paadam (2016). His directorial debut is Ivan Megharoopan (2012). He has also acted in a few films, the most notable being Trivandrum Lodge (2012).

== Personal life ==
He was born to Padmanabha Pillai and Saraswati Bhai on 2 February 1952, in Sasthamkotta, Kerala. He was married to Sreelatha and the couple had two children, Sreekanth and Parvathy.

=== Death ===
Balachandran died at the age of 69 on 5 April 2021 at his house in Vaikom. He had suffered from brain fever for a long time and was hospitalized many times, the last time being in July 2020. His body was cremated with full state honours.

== Awards ==
- 1989: Kerala Sahitya Akademi Award for Drama – Paavam Usman
- 2008: Kerala Sangeetha Nataka Akademi Award for Drama

== Filmography ==
=== As actor ===
Year	Title	Role
2023	Kolaambi	Kamal Pasha
2021
2021	Minnal Murali	Varghese
2021	Kurup	Gopalakrishna Pillai
2021	One	Attingal Madhusoodanan, MLA Opposition
2021	Operation Java	Balachandran
2020	Orange Marangalude Veedu	Raju
2019	Thakkol	Priest
2019	Edakkad Battalion 06	Mohammed Kutty
2019	Varthakal Ithuvare	Divakaran Nair
2019	Kolaambi	Kamal Pasha
2019	Athiran	Keshava Kaimal
2018	Eeda	Sriram Bhatt
2018	Oru Kaatil Oru Paykappal	
2017	Sakhavu	Namboorichan
2017	Vimaanam	Priest
2017	Hadiyya	
2017	Melle	
2017	C/O Saira Banu	Adv. Pappan
2017	Puthan Panam	Adv. M.K. Pillai
2017	Samarppanam	Balachandran
2016	Kismath	Appu Nair
2016	All of Us	
2016	Pa Va	Father Micheal Kallayi (Kallayi Achan)
2016	Appuram Bengal Ippuram Thiruvithamkoor	Nambeeshan
2016	Kammatti Paadam	Krishnan's father
2016	Hello Namasthe	Kuriachan Achayan
2016	Maanasaandarapetta Yezdi	Chethanappi
2015	Charlie	Usman Ikka
2015	Acha Dhin	Sir
2015	Life of Josutty	Jessy's Father Thomachan
2015	32aam Adhyayam 23aam Vaakyam	Doctor Noah
2014	Masala Republic	Pattanam Balan (Balettan)
2014	Actually	Gopalakrishnan
2014	John Paul Vaathil Thurakkunnu	Paul Zacharia
2014	Manglish	Krishna Swami
2014	Angry Babies in Love	Madhavan
2014	Law Point	Charlie
2014	Mosayile Kuthira Meenukal	Raviettan
2013	Ginger	Balakrishnan
2013	Kaanchi	Narayanan Nair
2013	Silence	Judge
2013	Nadan	Vikraman Pilla
2013	Daivathinte Swantham Cleetus	Raphael Vadakkumthala
2013	Kadal Kadannoru Mathukkutty	Kochunni
2013	Hotel California	Sasi Pillai
2013	Thank You	Balettan
2013	Immanuel	Gopinathan Nair
2013	David & Goliath	Father Gerald
2013	Ithu Pathiramanal	Priest
2013	Natholi Oru Cheriya Meenalla	Dronar
2013	Annayum Rasoolum	Rasheed
2012	Poppins	Gabriyel Methalakuzhi
2012	Trivandrum Lodge	Korah
2011	Beautiful	Advocate
2009	Neelathamara	Balan
2006	Mahasamudram	Marakkar
2003	Ivar	Minnal Thankan
2002	Shesham	
2002	Shivam	Padmanabhan
2002	Malayali Mamanu Vanakkam	Easwaran Pillai
2001	Vakkalathu Narayanankutty	Jayaram's father
2000	Punaradhivasam	Manoj K Jayan's father
1999	Jalamarmaram	
1995	Agnidevan	Edakka
1991	Aparahnam	
1982	Gandhi	Muslim in the crowd

=== As director ===
Year	Title
2012	Ivan Megharoopan

=== As script writer ===
Year	Title	Director
2019	Edakkad Battalion 06	Swapnesh K. Nair
2016	Kammatipaadam	Rajeev Ravi
2012	Ivan Megharoopan	Himself
2005	Police	V.K. Prakash
2000	Punaradhivasam	V.K. Prakash
1997	Manasam	C.S. Sudheesh
1995	Thacholi Varghese Chekavar	T. K. Rajeev Kumar
1995	Agnidevan	Venu Nagavalli
1994	Pavithram	T. K. Rajeev Kumar
1991	Ulladakkam	Kamal
1991	Uncle Bun	Bhadran
1991	Aparahanam	MP Sukumaran Nair
