= Joy Mathew =

Indian actor and director

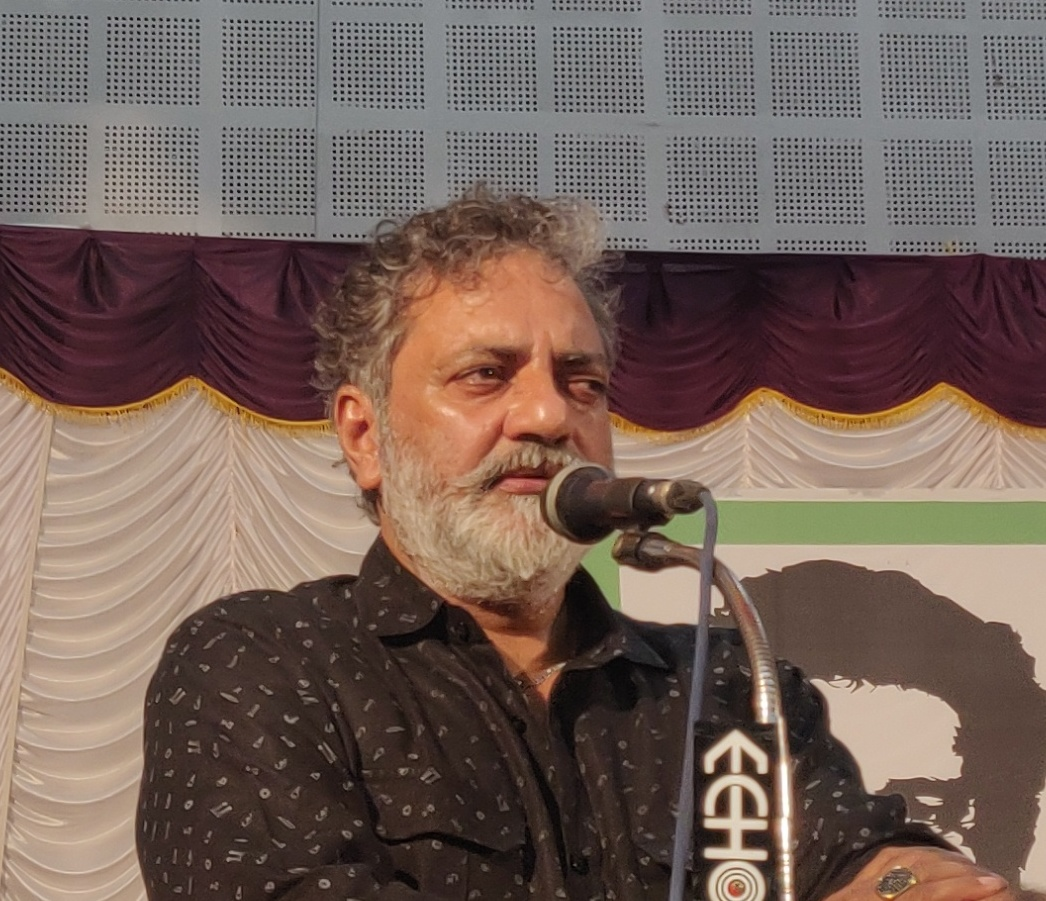
- Born: 20 September 1961 (age 65); Challissery, Calicut, India
- Occupations: Actor; director; playwright; screenwriter
- Spouse: Saritha Ann Thomas
- Children: 3

Joy Mathew (born 20 September 1961) is an Indian film and theatre actor. He is also a film director, playwright and screenwriter. He predominantly works in Malayalam cinema.

== Career ==
Joy Mathew is best known for playing the lead role in John Abraham's 1986 film Amma Ariyan which was voted one of the Top 10 Indian films by British Film Institute. In 2012, he made his directorial debut with Shutter which portrays unexpected incidents happening in two days and a night in the city of Kozhikode. The film had its Indian premiere at the 17th International Film Festival of Kerala and international premiere at the 9th Dubai International Film Festival. It won the Silver Crow Pheasant Award for Best Feature Film (Audience Prize) at the 17th International Film Festival of Kerala. Shutter was also screened at Chennai Film Festival (2012–13), Mumbai Film Festival (2012–13), Bangalore Film Festival (2012–13), Busan Film Festival (2012–13), Hamburg Film Festival (2012–13), and Indian Panorama (2012–13).

Joy Mathew has written more than 22 plays in Malayalam, such as Madhyadharanyazhi (1994), Veeedukal Kathunnu (1999), Athirthikkal (1989), Sankadal (1996), Pretoria – 18 Oct (1996) and Chille 73 (1997). He received the Kerala Sangeetha Nataka Akademi award for his play Sankadal in 1996. He was honoured by Kerala Sahitya Academy for the Best Anthology of one act plays "Sisu" in 1994 and Madhyadhanyazhi for the Best Drama in 1995, Daivathinte Thoppi (2015), Poonaranga (2015), Raktha Thabala (2017).

== Personal life ==
Joy Mathew was born to P. V. Mathew and Esther on 19 September 1959. He married Saritha Ann Thomas who had been working as the head of sales at Electronics Company Dubai. The couple have three children: Mathew, Ann and Tania.

== Awards ==
- 2012: International Film Festival of Kerala – Silver Crow Pheasant Award for Best Feature Film (Audience Prize) – Shutter
- 2013: Vanitha Film Awards – Best Scriptwriter – Shutter
- 2013: Asiavision Awards – Best Debut Director – Shutter
- 2013: Asiavision Awards – Best Anti Hero – Amen
- 2015: Kerala State Film Award – Special Mention for acting – Mohavalayam
- 2018: Kerala State Film Award for Best Story – Uncle

== Filmography ==
=== As actor ===
Year	Title	Role	Notes
1986	Amma Ariyan	Purushan	
2012	Shutter	Singer	Directorial debut
2013	Annayum Rasoolum	Mattanchery Joseph	
2013	Rose Guitarinaal	Daddy	
2013	Amen	Fr. Abraham Ottaplakal	
2013	Honey Bee	Cleetus	
2013	Neelakasham Pachakadal Chuvanna Bhoomi	Abdulla Haji	
2013	Zachariayude Garbhinikal	Anuradha's husband	
2013	Sringaravelan	Don Gopi Prasad	
2013	Philips and the Monkey Pen	Capt. Richard Philip	
2013	Idukki Gold	John	
2013	Bangles	Priest	
2013	Nadan	G. Krishna Kumar	
2013	Silence	Adv. Markose	
2014	1983	Gopi Aashan	
2014	Pranayakatha	Seban's father	
2014	Manja	Journalist Richard	
2014	Praise the Lord	Kunjutty	
2014	7th Day	P. T. R. Bhattathiri	
2014	Avatharam	Irumbanakkal Joseph	
2014	Vikramadithyan	Dr. Ramanath Pai	
2014	Law Point	Prof. John	
2014	Konthayum Poonoolum	Isaac	
2014	Sapthamashree Thaskaraha	Pius Mathew	
2014	Rajadhi Raja	Ahammed shah	
2014	Ulsahacommittee	Ayyankaar	
2014	Munnariyippu	T. G. Menon	
2014	Njaan	Joy Mathew	
2014	Ithihasa	Dr. Samuel	
2014	Asha Black		
2014	Angels	Fr. Varghese Punyalan	
2014	Oru Korean Padam	Director Joy Mathew	
2014	Nagara Varidhi Naduvil Njan	Minister Sebastian	
2015	Lailaa O Lailaa	Dr. Aravind Menon	
2015	Mariyam Mukku	Sayip (Salomi's father)	
2015	Rasputin	Vayalil Satheesan	
2015	Utopiayile Rajavu	C. Parameswaran Pillai	
2015	Pathemari	Chandran	
2015	Jamna Pyari	Prakashan	
2015	Swargathekkal Sundaram	Lopez/Gee Varghese	
2015	Alif	Hajiyar	
2015	Chirakodinja Kinavukal	Virakuvettukaran	
2015	Monsoon	Mamachan	
2015	Namukkore Aakasham	Col. John Samuel	
2015	Loham	Arif Bhai	
2015	Oru Korean Padam	Himself	
2015	Charlie	Ummer	
2016	Mohavalayam	Jose Sebastian	
2016	King Liar	Pothuval Master	
2016	Devi	Krishna's father	Trilingual film
2017	God Say		
2017	Oru Cinemakkaran	Pothuval Master	
2017	Munthirivallikal Thalirkkumbol	Ulahannan's friend	
2017	Chakkaramaavin Kombathu	Ali Mammu	
2017	Puthan Panam	Mahin Haji	
2017	Chippy	John Samuel	
2017	Clint	Dr. Samuel	
2017	Goodalochana	Rahim Hajji	
2017	Crossroad	drama director	
2017	Pathirakalam	Narration	
2017	Paathi	Theyyam Kalakaran	
2017	Balloon	Fr. Andrews	
2018	The Sound Story	George	Docufiction
2018	Kinar	Hariharan	Bilingual film
2018	Keni	Hariharan	Tamil
2018	Uncle	Vijayan	
2018	Udalaazham	Rameshan	
2018	Street Lights	Joseph	
2018	Chalakkudikkaran Changathi	Thamburan	
2018	Sthalam	Fr. Varghese	
2019	Mr. & Ms. Rowdy	Abraham Mathew	
2019	Children's Park	Govindan	
2019	Naan Petta Makan	Simon Britto	
2019	Marconi Mathai	Luca Mappla	
2019	Thelivu		
2019	Edakkad Battalion 06	Basheer	
2021	Drishyam 2	Adv. Janardhanan	Amazon Prime Release
2021	Kenjira		Paniya Language Movie
2021	Kanakam Kaamini Kalaham	Balachandran	
2022	Karnan Napoleon Bhagath Singh	Cherian	
2022	Naaradan	Shivadas Kurup	
2023	Christy	Joseph	
2023	1921: Puzha Muthal Puzha Vare		
2023	Dhoomam	Minister	
2023	Chaaver	Mukundan	
2024	Oru Sarkar Ulpannam	Judge	
2024	Badal		
2024	Jamalinte Punjiri		
2024	Sree Muthappan		
2024	Swargathile Katturumbu		
2024	Chithini		
2024	Manorathangal	Raghavan Mama	Segment: Silalikhitham
2025	Haal		
2026	Koodothram		
2026	Aroopi		
2026	Law and Order	IG Dhananjayan	
2027	Harivarasanam †	TBA	

=== As director, writer ===
Year	Title	Credited as		Notes
Year	Title	Director	Writer	Notes
1996	Saamoohyapaadam		Yes	
2012	Shutter	Yes	Yes	Directorial debut
2018	Uncle		Yes	
2023	Chaaver		Yes	
