= Kheda (disambiguation) =

Kheda is a city and municipality in the Indian state of Gujarat.

Kheda may also refer to:

== Places ==
- Kheda district, Gujarat
  - Kheda Satyagraha of 1918, satyagraha movement by Mahatma Gandhi in the district
- Kheda Lok Sabha constituency, Gujarat
- Kheda, Jhabua, village in the Indian state of Madhya Pradesh

== Other uses ==
- Khedda, elephant traps in India
- Khedda (film), an Indian Malayalam-language film
- Khera, a surname
- Kheda Kungaeva (1982–2000), Chechen woman allegedly murdered during the Second Chechen War

== See also ==
- Khaira (disambiguation)
