= Khed =

Khed may refer to several places and administrative divisions in India:

- Khed, Ratnagiri, a town in Ratnagiri district, Maharashtra
  - Khed taluka, Ratnagiri, the administrative division
  - Khed Assembly constituency, a former constituency
  - Khed (Lok Sabha constituency), a former constituency
- Khed, Satara, a census town in Satara district, Maharashtra
- Rajgurunagar (Khed), a census town in Pune district, Maharashtra
  - Khed taluka, the administrative division
- Khed Shivapur, a village in Pune district, Maharashtra
- Khed, Rajasthan, a village in Barmer district, Rajasthan

== See also ==
- Kher (disambiguation)
- Khergarh (disambiguation)
- Kheda, city in Gujarat, India
  - Kheda (Lok Sabha constituency)
- Khedda, a type of elephant trap in India
- Khedda (film), a 2022 Indian film
