= Ajay Devaloka =

Indian film director and editor

- Born: Ajay V.P; Calicut, India
- Other names: Ajay, Devloka
- Citizenship: India
- Education: Mysore University
- Occupations: Director, editor and producer
- Years active: 2012–present
- Notable work: WHO; Saint Dracula 3D; The Last Vision

Ajay Devaloka is an Indian Film director, writer, and editor. Mumbai based Malayali Ajay Devaloka began his career in films & advertising as an editor. He was one of the youngest film editors in 2011 when he edited his debut International feature The Last Vision.

‘WHO’ is a directorial debut venture of Ajay Devaloka. He has served as the editor for films such as Saint Dracula 3D, Kamasutra 3D, Anointer, Dancing Death, Katari Veera Sura Sundrangi 3D, I am From Kolkata, Ennennum Ormmyaykkai and Bul Bul Maina. Some of his other movies are The Last Vision, and Raktharakshassu in Malayalam.

His first movie as a director was Perfectionist in 2012, a thriller road movie produced by E P Varghese. He is currently doing a crime thriller titled Aaraam Thirukalpana with Nithya Menen and Shine Tom Chacko produced under the banner Corridor 6 Films, a production company co-founded by Ajay Devaloka.

== Early life ==
Ajay Devaloka was born in Calicut, Kerala. After completing a Diploma in Animation and VFX, he joined the Department of Studies in Criminology and Forensic science, Maharaja's College, Mysore.

== Career ==
In 2012, he edited his first movie, Last Vision. As of 2014, he has edited more than twenty movies apart from music videos, film trailers, documentaries, and award-winning shorts.

Also, after 9 years in the industry Ajay Devaloka has cut over 60 AD films (across India and Middle East) in a wide variety of genres as well as TV dramas, online editing for feature films all over India, music videos, film trailers, documentaries and award-winning shorts. His film WHO had its world premiere at Festival De Cannes 2018 in Marche Du. Also, the movie was nominated for Best Director and Best Sound in the Top Indie Film Awards, in 2018.

== Isabella ==
His next movie as director starring Shine Tom Chacko and Rajeev Pillai to have two parts. The movie said to be the first neo-noir movie in Malayalam, is titled, 'Isabella'. The title was launched by producer GoodKnight Mohan, who was the producer of a movie with the same name in 1988. It is reported that both the movies are different. Isabella is based on real-life incidents that happened a century ago in western India. Shruthy Menon will play a pivotal role in Isabella. The music to be composed by Manikandan Ayyappa Writer Shyam Menon will pen the dialogues of the movie, while Thyagu Thavanur Basil is the Art Director. A prequel to Isabella 'WHO' was announced with the same cast as Isabella. The posters of the movie are already out. The shooting is in progress at the valleys of Nainital and Munnar. WHO waddles in magic realism and is said to be based on dream interpretations. Shruthy Menon dons the cape of Arunima, a central character in the movie.

== Who ==
Who a Malayalam time travel film cutting across Sci-Fi, Mystery, Fantasy, Thriller, Magic Realism, and noir directed by Ajay Devaloka and produced by Corridor 6 Films is set for Indian theatrical release on 25 October.

== Filmography ==
Year	Title	Director	Producer	Notes
2012	The Last Vision	Sajan Kurian	Ravi Kumar Devakar	As Editor
2012	Saint Dracula 3D	Rupesh Paul	Sohan Roy	As Editor
2013	Ennennum Ormmaykkai	Robin Joseph	Shafeek, Shylock	As Editor
2014	Raktharakshass	R Factor	R Factor	As Editor
2014	Kamasutra 3D	Rupesh Paul	George Jhon	As Editor
2014	Monologues of an Indian Sex Maniac	Sritama Dutta	Rupesh Paul	As Editor
2014	Kanthari	Ajmal	R Prabhu Kumar	As Editor
2018	Who	Himself	Corridor 6 Films	
2024	Aaraam Thirukalpana	Himself	Corridor 6 Films	Completed
2026	Isabella	Himself	Corridor 6 Films	Pre-production

== Awards ==
Year	Award	Film	Category	Result	Notes
2017	Top Indie Film Awards	Who	Best Director	Nominated	
