= Saint Dracula 3D =

2012 film by Rupesh Paul

- Promotional poster
- Directed by: Rupesh Paul
- Produced by: BizTV Network; Aries Telecasting Pvt Ltd
- Starring: Mitch Powell; Patricia Duarte; Daniel Shayler; Suzanne Roche; Bill Hutchens; Carl Wharton; Michael Christopher; Anna Burkholder; Lawrence Larkin
- Cinematography: Francois Coppey
- Edited by: Ajay Devaloka
- Music by: Sreevalsan J Menon
- Distributed by: Indywood Distribution Network
- Release date: 23 November 2012
- Language: English
- Budget: $10 million

Saint Dracula 3D is a 2012 film directed by Rupesh Paul. Produced by BizTV Network. The film was released in English and dubbed in Malayalam.

== Filming ==
The film was shot in Liverpool, Manchester and Wales in the UK. Director Rupesh Paul along with Sohan Roy, the director of the film Dam 999 completed the movie with a cast and crew from the UK. The entire movie was shot on camera 'RED' by Frenchman Francois Coppey, the Director of Photography, while the stereography was done by Julian Crivelli. The movie was released in 2012.

As of March 2013, the film was available as a part of the Freestyle Life Film Exhibition.

== Cast ==
- Mitch Powell – as Dracula
- Patricia Duarte – as Clara
- Daniel Shayler – as Benjamin
- Suzanne Roche – as Sr. Agnes
- 414Bill Hutchens – as Fr. Nicholson
- Carl Wharton – as The Vicar
- Michael Christopher – as The Bishop
- Anna Burkholder – as Hay
- Lawrence Larkin – as FBI Agent Carlo
- Nicola Jeanne – as The Mother Superior

== Oscar eligibility ==
In 2012, the movie was one of 282 feature films eligible for an Oscar Award for Best Picture at the 85th Oscars. Two of the songs as well as the background score of the film were also eligible for the Best Song and Best Original Soundtrack award categories. Saint Dracula 3D was one of two feature films from India to be included in the category, the second one being Akashathinte Niram by Dr Biju.

== See also ==
- Vampire film
