= Robin Kunjukutty =

Indian film sound editor and re-recording mixer

- Born: 12 January 1991 (age 35); Sasthamkotta, Kollam district, Kerala, India
- Education: Sound Engineering Academy, Thiruvananthapuram
- Occupation: Audio engineer
- Years active: 2011-present
- Spouse: Jincy
- Children: 2

Robin Kunjukutty (born 12 January 1991) is an Indian film sound designer, sound editor and re-recording mixer, who predominantly works in various Indian language films and web series including Hindi and Malayalam. He is a member of the Motion Picture Sound Editors. He won Kerala Film Critics Association Award 2024 for Best Sound (re-recording mix) for the film Vadakkan. He co-founded Sonic Drops Studio, a sound post-production studio, along with Tony Babu in Mumbai.

== Career ==
After completing the sound engineering course from Sound Engineering Academy, Trivandrum, Robin moved to Mumbai and assisted sound designer Niraj Gera. Starting his career as an assistant sound editor for B.A. Pass, he then works as independent sound editor, designer and mixing engineer for various films including Ugly, Jolly LLB 2, Raman Raghav 2.0, Eeda, Kala, Meppadiyan, Modern Love Mumbai and Ouseppinte Osiyathu.

== Selected filmography ==
Year	Title	Film	Web Series	Short Film	Documentary	Credit	Director(s)	Language	Ref(s)
2012	B.A. Pass	Yes				Asst. sound editor	Ajay Bahl	Hindi	
2012	Memories and Forgetfulness				Yes	Sound editor	Ani Thomas	English, Hindi, Rajasthani	
2012	MTV Sound Trippin		Yes			Sound editor Re-recording mixer	Sneha Khanwalkar	Hindi	
2013	Shahid	Yes				Sound editor	Hansal Mehta	Hindi	
2013	Ugly	Yes				Sound editor	Anurag Kashyap	Hindi	
2015	18 Feet				Yes	Sound designer Re-recording mixer	Renjith Kuzhur	Malayalam	
2015	Ottaal	Yes				Sound editor Dialogue editor	Jayaraj	Malayalam	
2016	Raman Raghav 2.0	Yes				Sound editor Dialogue editor	Anurag Kashyap	Hindi	
2017	Jolly LLB 2	Yes				Sound editor	Subhash Kapoor	Hindi	
2017	Newton	Yes				Sound editor	Amit V. Masurkar	Hindi	
2017	Sakhavu	Yes				Sound editor	Sidhartha Siva	Malayalam	
2017	Adventures of Omanakuttan	Yes				Sound editor	Rohith V. S.	Malayalam	
2017	Sthir			Yes		Sound designer Re-recording mixer	Anastasiya Ador	Russian	
2017	Tharangam	Yes				Sound editor	Dominic Arun	Malayalam	
2018	Eeda	Yes				Sound editor	B. Ajithkumar	Malayalam	
2018	Who	Yes				Sound editor	Ajay Devaloka	Malayalam	
2018	Waft			Yes		Sound designer Re-recording mixer	Vishnu Udayan	Malayalam	
2019	Kenjira	Yes				Sound designer	Manoj Kana	Paniya	
2020	State of Siege: 26/11		Yes			Re-recording mixer	Matthew Leutwyler; Prashant Singh	Hindi	
2020	Paatal Lok		Yes			Dialogue editor	Avinash Arun; Prosit Roy	Hindi	
2020	Lockdown: India Fights Coronavirus				Yes	Sound designer Re-recording mixer	Sajeed A.	Hindi	
2020	Numen			Yes		Sound designer Re-recording mixer	Kiran Pullanoor	English	
2021	Kala	Yes				Re-recording mixer	Rohith V. S.	Malayalam	
2021	Dhamaka	Yes				Dialogue editor	Ram Madhvani	Hindi	
2021	Saina	Yes				Dialogue editor	Amole Gupte	Hindi	
2021	Shoebox	Yes				Re-recording mixer	Faraz Ali	Hindi	
2022	Meppadiyan	Yes				Re-recording mixer	Vishnu Mohan	Malayalam	
2022	Modern Love Mumbai		Yes			Dialogue editor Re-recording mixer		Hindi	
2022	Village Cricket Boy			Yes		Final mix	Rahul R. Sarma	Malayalam	
2023	Thadavu	Yes				Re-recording mixer	Fazil Razak	Malayalam	
2024	Dange/Por	Yes				Re-recording mixer	Bejoy Nambiar	Hindi/Tamil	
2024	Murder In Mahim		Yes			Re-recording mixer	Raj Acharya	Hindi	
2025	Vadakkan	Yes				Re-recording mixer	Sajeed A.	Malayalam	
2025	Ouseppinte Osiyathu	Yes				Re-recording mixer	Sarath Chandran R. J.	Malayalam	
2025	Ground Zero	Yes				Re-recording mixer	Tejas Prabha Vijay Deoskar	Hindi	

== Accolades ==
Year	Award	Category	Work	Ref(s)
2021	Indian Recording Arts Academy (IRAA) Awards	Best Documentary Mixing	Lockdown: India Fights Coronavirus	
2021	Indian Recording Arts Academy (IRAA) Awards	Best Sound Designer for Short Films	Numen	
2021	Indian Recording Arts Academy (IRAA) Awards	Best Short Film Mixing	Numen	
2022	Indian Recording Arts Academy (IRAA) Awards	Best Dialogue editor/ADR engineer (Film or Web Release - Hindi)	Saina	
2024	Kerala Film Critics Association Awards	Best Sound (Re-recording Mix)	Vadakkan	
