= Kher =

Kher may refer to:

- Acacia senegal, a species of acacia
- Senegalia catechu, a species of thorny tree
- Kher, Rajasthan, a village in Barmer district, Rajasthan, India
- Kher (surname), an Indian surname (for persons with the name, see)
- Kher River, a tributary of the Gambhir River of Rajasthan, India
- The acrophonic name of the letter Kha (Cyrillic) in the old Russian alphabet

== See also ==
- Khair (disambiguation), a city in Uttar Pradesh, India
- Khed (disambiguation)
- Khergarh (disambiguation)
- Ker (disambiguation)
