= Khaira =

Khaira may refer to:

- Khaira (surname), including a list of people with the name
- Khaira, Nepal, a town in Pyuthan, Nepal
- Khaira, Palghar, a town in Maharashtra, India
- Khaira, Delhi, an urban village in Delhi, India
- Khaira, Ludhiana, a village in Punjab, India
- Khaira, Raebareli, a village in Uttar Pradesh, India

== See also ==
- Khair (disambiguation)
- Khara (disambiguation)
- Kheda (disambiguation)
