= Diiriye =

Diiriye may refer to:

- Diriye Osman, Somali-British writer
- Abdillahi Diiriye Guled, Somali scholar
- Asha Gelle Dirie, activist for Puntite and Puntland women
- Waris Dirie, Somali model and author

== See also ==
- Khair (disambiguation)
