= Saina (film) =

2021 Indian film by Amole Gupte

- Theatrical release poster
- Directed by: Amole Gupte
- Written by: Amole Gupte
- Based on: Saina Nehwal
- Produced by: Bhushan Kumar; Krishan Kumar; Sujay Jairaj; Rashesh Shah
- Starring: Parineeti Chopra
- Cinematography: Piyush Shah
- Edited by: Deepa Bhatia
- Music by: Amaal Malik
- Production companies: T-Series Films; Front Foot Pictures
- Distributed by: Cinestaan AA Distributors
- Release date: 26 March 2021
- Running time: 135 minutes
- Country: India
- Language: Hindi
- Budget: ₹26 crores
- Box office: ₹1.5 crore

Saina is a 2021 Indian Hindi-language biographical sports film directed by Amole Gupte and produced by Bhushan Kumar, Krishan Kumar, Sujay Jairaj and Rashesh Shah under the banner of T-Series and Front Foot Pictures. Based on the life of badminton player Saina Nehwal, the film stars Parineeti Chopra as Nehwal.

The film was initially set to release in September 2020, but was postponed due to the COVID-19 pandemic in India. It was theatrically released on 26 March 2021 to mixed reviews with praise towards Chopra's performance.

== Plot ==
The film traces Saina's journey from her training at Lal Bahadur Shastri Stadium, Hyderabad, her struggles, her parents sacrifices for her dreams, her passion for badminton, her relationship with Kashyap and her coach Rajan to her becoming World's No.1.

== Cast ==
- Parineeti Chopra as Saina Nehwal
- Manav Kaul as Coach Sarvadhamaan Rajan, a fictionalized version of Pullela Gopichand
- Eshan Naqvi as Parupalli Kashyap
- Meghna Malik as Usha Rani Nehwal, Saina's mother
- Subhrajyoti Barat as Harvir Singh Nehwal, Saina's father
- Ankur Vikal as Coach Jeewan Kumar
- Tawhid Rike Zaman as Rohan's Friend
- Sharrman Dey as Damodar
- Sameer Bassi as Rohan
- Taiyaba Mansuri as young Abu Nehwal

== Production ==
=== Development ===
Saina Nehwal revealing the details of the film, on her Twitter account announced the film on 26 April 2017. Earlier, Shraddha Kapoor was signed to play Nehwal's role, and she even started filming in September 2018 after training, but later she opted out of the film due to health issues. On 15 March 2019, it was confirmed by T-Series head honcho Bhushan Kumar that Shraddha Kapoor will not be playing the role of Nehwal. In a statement they said, "Due to circumstances beyond her control, the actress kept giving other films priority over the national badminton champion’s biopic, so the makers have decided to go ahead with Chopra."

In June, Manav Kaul was finalized to play the role of Pullela Gopichand who is Nehwal's coach.

=== Training ===
From mid June, Chopra was training herself in playing badminton and practicing the stances of Nehwal. As many as 12 courts were recreated to represent international venues where Saina Nehwal has played.

== Reception ==
=== Box office ===
The film collected total ₹ 1.2 crore in its theatrical run, it was declared a flop and disastrous.

It was impacted due to COVID-19.

=== Critical reception ===
Saina received mixed to positive reviews from critics with praises towards Chopra's performance. On the review aggregator website Rotten Tomatoes, 60% of 10 critics' reviews are positive, with an average rating of 5.9/10.

Yogesh Mishra of 'Bollywood Town' says "Movie beautifully talks about the success saga of a middle-class girl from Haryana". Shubhra Gupta of The Indian Express gave 3 out of 5 stars and noted that Parineeti "serves, drops and smashes as [the] badminton champ", writing "[Chopra] gives us a good, solid Saina Nehwal. When she raises her racket after a hard-fought win, you cheer."

Film critic Anna M. M. Vetticad applauded Chopra for rising to the challenge of playing the sports icon, writing "The actor plays down her naturally vivacious personality and sparkling eyes for the not-so-showy character she plays here. Most impressively, she gets the body language of a sportsperson right and actually looks the part on court." She gave the film 2.75 star out of 5 and pointed out that the film erases Gopichand and skirts inconvenient truths.

Renuka Vyavahare of The Times of India gave the film 3.5 stars out of 5 and wrote, "Saina is a simple ode to eternal optimism". For Chopra's performance she said, "Parineeti push herself in this physically demanding role".

== Accolades ==
Award	Date of the ceremony	Category	Recipients	Result	Ref.
67th Filmfare Awards	30 August 2022	Best Supporting Actress	Meghna Malik	Nominated	
67th Filmfare Awards	30 August 2022	Best Supporting Actor	Manav Kaul	Nominated	
67th Filmfare Awards	30 August 2022	Best Music Album	Amaal Malik	Nominated	
67th Filmfare Awards	30 August 2022	Best Lyrics	Manoj Muntashir	Nominated	
68th National Film Awards	30 September 2022	Best Lyrics	Manoj Muntashir	Won	
IRAA Awards	27 May 2023	Best Dialogue editor/ADR engineer (Film or Web Release - Hindi)	Robin Kunjukutty	Won	
IRAA Awards	27 May 2023	Best Mixing (Film or Web Release - Hindi)	Alok Dey	Won	

== Soundtrack ==
Saina

Soundtrack album by Amaal Mallik
- Released: 26 March 2021
- Recorded: 2020
- Genre: Feature film soundtrack
- Length: 37:18
- Language: Hindi
- Label: T-Series
- Producer: Meghdeep Bose

Amaal Mallik chronology
Kabir Singh (2019)	Saina (2021)	Koi Jaane Na (2021)

Official audio
- Saina - Full Album on YouTube

The soundtrack is composed by Amaal Mallik, produced, arranged & co-written by Meghdeep Bose with lyrics by Manoj Muntashir and Kunaal Vermaa.

Track listing
No.	Title	Lyrics	Singer(s)	Length
1.	"Exordium"	—	—	1:20
2.	"Chal Wahin Chalein"	Manoj Muntashir	Shreya Ghoshal	5:10
3.	"The Staircase Of Life"	—	Shreya Ghoshal	2:31
4.	"Embrace Yourself"	—	Shreya Ghoshal	1:38
5.	"Parinda"	Manoj Muntashir	Amaal Mallik	5:14
6.	"One Point For The Sky"	—	—	1:52
7.	"A Mother's Love"	Manoj Muntashir	Suvarna Tiwari	1:14
8.	"Confluence Of Dreams"	—	—	1:22
9.	"Main Hoon Na Tere Saath"	Kunaal Vermaa	Armaan Malik	5:27
10.	"A Rally Of Love & Success"	—	—	1:46
11.	"The Curse Of A Champion"	—	Snigdha Pious	3:06
12.	"Hall Of Mirrors"	—	Shreya Ghoshal	3:38
13.	"The Sword Of Saina"	—	Suzanne D'Mello	3:00
Total length:				37:18
