= Pithavum Kanyakayum =

Pithavum Kanyakayum (Daddy, You Bastard)
- Directed by: Rupesh Paul; N. K. Sajiv Menon
- Screenplay by: Rupesh Paul
- Story by: Indu Menon
- Produced by: N. K. Sajiv Menon
- Starring: M. G. Sasi; Krupa; Sasi Kalinga
- Cinematography: Subhash V. K.
- Music by: Sandeep Jayaraj
- Production company: Famous Films
- Release date: 4 October 2013
- Running time: 90 minutes
- Country: India
- Language: Malayalam

Pithavum Kanyakayum (Malayalam: പിതാവും കന്യകയും; literally meaning Father and Virgin), officially titled in English as Daddy, You Bastard, is a 2013 Malayalam film directed by Rupesh Paul and N. K. Sajiv Menon. The story is about a middle-aged man who spends the night with a girl who happens to be his daughter's classmate. Short story writer Indu Menon has written the story while her husband, Rupesh Paul, has written the script and dialogue for the film. The cast include M. G. Sasi, director of the award-winning film Atayalangal, Krupa and Sasi Kalinga. The film premiered in the Marche du Film section of 2010 Cannes Film Festival. It released in theatres on 4 October 2013.

== Plot ==
The film centres on Balachandran, a middle-aged government employee and artist whose troubled marriage has left him emotionally detached. Seeking an escape from the routine of his life, he arranges to spend an evening with Agnes, a friend of his daughter and a higher secondary school student, at a flat borrowed from a friend. Although conflicted about the situation, he proceeds with the meeting.

During the course of the evening, Agnes displays a confidence and assertiveness that contrasts with Balachandran's uncertainty and hesitation. Their interaction takes an unexpected turn when Agnes reveals a personal detail about her life that forces Balachandran to confront the implications of their relationship. The film uses this encounter to explore themes of desire, guilt, morality, and personal responsibility.

== Cast ==
- M. G. Sasi as Balachandran
- Kripa as Agnes
- Sasi Kalinga
