= Laptop (2008 film) =

2008 film by Rupesh Paul

- Directed by: Rupesh Paul
- Screenplay by: Indu Menon
- Story by: Subhash Chandran
- Produced by: E.A. Joseprakash
- Starring: Suresh Gopi; Shweta Menon; Padmapriya
- Cinematography: V Vinod
- Edited by: Vijayakumar
- Music by: Sreevatsan J Menon
- Release date: 25 July 2008
- Country: India
- Language: Malayalam

Laptop, also known as My Mother's Laptop, is a 2008 Malayalam film by Rupesh Paul (in his directorial debut). starring Suresh Gopi and Padmapriya. The film is based on a short story titled 'Parudheesa Nashtam' by Subhash Chandran.

== Plot ==
Ravi is a famous theatre artist. He returns home after thirty long years and finds that his mother is in a coma state following some terminal illness. His guilt feelings and deep regrets of having deserted her forces him to leave his profession and stay at the hospital with his mom. His girlfriend Payal comes from Calcutta to console him and persuade him to return to his profession. But he is adamant.

== Cast ==
- Suresh Gopi as Ravi
- Shweta Menon as Ravi's mother
- Padmapriya as Payal
- Urmila Unni
- Surjith Gopinath
- Madhuben
- Harikrishnan Nair S

== Soundtrack ==
All music is composed by Sreevalsan J Menon.

No.	Title	Artist(s)	Length
1.	"Etho Jalashankhil [D]"	Amal Antony, Soniya
2.	"Etho Jalashankhil [F]"	Soniya
3.	"Ilam Neelaneela Mizhikal"	Amal Antony
4.	"Vaathil Chaaraanaayi"	Sreevalsan J. Menon
5.	"Jalashayyayil"	Soniya
6.	"Jalashayyayil [F]"	Kalyani Menon
7.	"May Maasame"	Amal Antony

== Reception ==
Rediff.com gave the film a score of 1/5, praising the promising opening of the film, but felt that the movie lost its momentum pretty soon.
