= Gaandharvam =

- Directed by: B. K. Pottekkad
- Written by: A. R. Kizhuthally
- Starring: Prem Nazir; Adoor Bhasi; Bahadoor; Major Sundararajan
- Edited by: Sreekar Prasad
- Music by: M. S. Baburaj
- Production company: CNR Pictures
- Distributed by: CNR Pictures
- Release date: 6 January 1978
- Country: India
- Language: Malayalam

Gaandharvam is a 1978 Indian Malayalam-language film, directed by B. K. Pottekkad. The film stars Prem Nazir, Adoor Bhasi, Bahadoor and Major Sundararajan in the lead roles. The film has musical score by M. S. Baburaj.

== Cast ==
- Prem Nazir
- Adoor Bhasi
- Bahadoor
- Major Sundararajan
- Vincent

== Soundtrack ==
The music was composed by MS Baburaj and the lyrics were written by P. Bhaskaran and Mankombu Gopalakrishnan.

No.	Song	Singers	Lyrics	Length (m:ss)
1	"Arayil Kidakkumen"	S. Janaki	P. Bhaskaran	
2	"Eeran Chirakumaay"	Yashoda Palayad	Mankombu Gopalakrishnan	
3	"Indrachaapam Mizhikalil"	L. R. Eeswari	Mankombu Gopalakrishnan	
4	"Sankalpa Saagara Theerathu"	K. J. Yesudas, B. Vasantha	P. Bhaskaran	
5	"Vadikkozhinja"	K. J. Yesudas	Mankombu Gopalakrishnan	
