= Joshua Fredric Smith =

American actor from Northern California (born c. 1981)

Joshua Fredric Smith (born c. 1981) is an American actor from Northern California. He played onscreen at the age of 12. His latest movie is Dam 999., directed by Sohan Roy.

== Career ==
Joshua landed his first acting job through a . After that he was cast in several supporting roles in independent films, including Absolute Evil, a film starring David Carradine, Caravaggio: The Search and Born That Way. Since then, Joshua has appeared in various TV shows (Dirty Sexy Money, Greek), commercials and music videos, including starring in the New Kids on the Block "2 in the Morning" music video produced by Donnie Wahlberg. His most recent film credits include starring roles in Finding a Place and The Road to Freedom, the latter of which is an epic war tale based on true-life events. The Road to Freedom tells the account of two photojournalists who brave the deep jungles of war-torn Cambodia to get their story of despairing humanity during the 1972 Khmer Rouge terrorism.

In his latest movie Dam 999, he plays Captain Fredrick Brown, a tongue-in-cheek Anglo-Indian mariner, an epitome of Hasya, the rasa of mirth and fun. In 2015 it was chosen to make part of the latest Avicii video "Broken Arrows".

== Filmography ==
- Year Zero (2014) (film) (a.k.a. Red Khmer) .... Sean
- Dam 999 (2011) (film) .... Fredrick Brown
- The Road to Freedom (2011) .... Sean
- Finding a Place (2009) .... Josh
- Caravaggio: The Search (2010) .... Michael Arch Angel
- Big Time Rush (2009) TV series .... Engineer dude (unknown episodes)
- Absolute Evil (2009) .... Joe
- Born That Way (2009) .... Assailant / Sniper
- In My Pocket (2009) .... Bandmember
- The Barrow Gang (1995) .... Boy on bike
- Quest of the Delta Knights (1993) (V) (uncredited) .... Young boy
