= Narayaneente Moonnaanmakkal =

- Theatrical release poster
- Directed by: Sharan Venugopal
- Written by: Sharan Venugopal
- Produced by: Joby George Thadathil
- Starring: Joju George; Suraj Venjaramoodu; Alencier Ley Lopez
- Cinematography: Appu Prabhakar
- Edited by: Jyoti Swaroop Panda
- Music by: Rahul Raj
- Production company: Goodwill Entertainments
- Distributed by: Goodwill Entertainments; Phars Films (Overseas); Yash Raj Films (UK/Europe)
- Release date: 7 February 2025
- Running time: 108 minutes
- Country: India
- Language: Malayalam
- Budget: ₹5.48 crore

Narayaneente Moonnaanmakkal (transl. The Three Sons of Narayani) is a 2025 Indian Malayalam-language family drama film written and directed by Sharan Venugopal featuring Joju George, Suraj Venjaramoodu and Alencier Ley Lopez in the lead roles. The film tells the tale of three distanced brothers who arrive at their ancestral home after decades to be near their dying mother. The film features music composed by Rahul Raj while Appu Prabhakar serves as the cinematographer and Jyoti Swaroop Panda, the editor of the director's National Award-winning film Oru Paathiraa Swapnam Pole edits the film.

== Plot ==
Vishwanathan (Vishwan), Sethu and Bhasker (Bhaskaran) are three estranged brothers who reunite at their ancestral home in Koyilandi, as their ailing mother, Narayani, comes to the end of her life.

Vishwan upholds traditional values and sees himself as the guardian of the family's legacy, harboring deep-seated resentments. Sethu, the middle brother, has remained unmarried in the family home, caring for their mother while leading a quiet and often overlooked life due to his learning disorder. Bhaskaran, the youngest, distanced himself from the family to London after marrying his girlfriend Nafeesa, a decision that caused a rift between him and his elder brother, Vishwan.

As the brothers return home, old tensions resurface. Sethu, the mediator tries to ease the growing tension, urging his brothers to let go of their bitterness.

The situation becomes significantly worse, when Bhaskaran's son Nikhil and Vishwan's daughter Athira gets involved in a incestuous love romantic relationship.

== Cast ==
- Joju George as Sethu
  - Master Aswajith as young Sethu
- Suraj Venjaramoodu as Bhaskaran (Bhasker) , Nikhil's father
  - Master Rashif as young Bhaskaran
- Alencier Ley Lopez as Vishwanathan (Vishwan), Athira's father
  - Master Akshath as young Vishwan
- Thomas Mathew as Nikhil, Bhaskaran's son
- Garggi Ananthan as Athira, Vishwanathan's daughter
- Shelly Kishore as Nafisa, Bhaskaran's wife and Nikhil's mother
- Sajitha Madathil as Jayasree, Vishwanathan's wife and Athira's mother
- Sulochana as Narayani
- Noomi Kashi as Thanuja
- Sarasa Balussery as Devaki
- Savithri Meloor as Sarojini Amma
- Priya Sreejith as Latha, Bhaskaran's first crush
- Ganga as Indu
- Yamuna as Bindu
- Sreelakshmi Meledath as Dhanya, Athira's childhood friend
- Jithin as DJ Rajesh Koyilandy
- Kumar Sunil as Adv. Rajan
- V. K. Ravi as Raman Nair
- Rahul Radhakrishnan as Hari
- Abu Valayamkulam as Dr. Ali
- Beena Geo as Sheela
- Pradeep Kumar as Father

=== Family Tree of Narayani's family ===
Dotted lines indicate a love relationship between characters, and dashed lines indicate marriage relationship between characters.

† Indicates a deceased character.

Chandran† | Narayani†
Viswanathan | Jayasree | Sethu | Bhaskar | Nafiza
Athira | Nikhil | Thanooja

== Production ==
After directing the National Award-winning short film Oru Paathiraa Swapnam Pole, Sharan Venugopal, an alumnus of Satyajit Ray Film and Television Institute wrote a screenplay for his feature directorial debut, based on a premise he had developed in 2018. After completing the first draft, he approached actor Joju George to play the lead role. After getting a green light from the actor, he brought actors Suraj Venjaramoodu and Alencier Ley Lopez on board to play the other lead roles.

He signed Rahul Raj as the composer, Appu Prabhakar as the cinematographer and his film school colleague Jyoti Swaroop Panda as the editor.

The principal photography of the film began in December 2022 and got wrapped up in January 2023.

== Release ==
The film had its worldwide theatrical release on 7 February 2025, garnering widespread critical acclaim. In India, the film started its online streaming through Amazon Prime Video from 7 March 2025.

== Reception ==
The film opened to overwhelmingly positive reviews and critical acclaim. S. R. Praveen of The Hindu reviewed the film positively calling it "A character-driven drama marked by its remarkable restraint". Sanjith Sidharthan of OTTPlay reviewed the film praised the film saying "Sharan Venugopal's soothing, simmering family drama is an absolute gem". Kirubhakar Purushothaman of News18 rated the film 4.5 out of 5 calling it "An Incredibly Moving Family Drama Of Homecoming". Subhash K Jha in his review for News 24 online called it a "Subtle, Emotionally Charged Masterpiece!". Vivek Santhosh of The New Indian Express rated the movie 3.5/5 and called it "A tender ode to family, love and letting go."
