= Odala (disambiguation) =

Odala may refer to:

- Minister Odala, a character in star wars
- Odala, town in Palestinian territories
- Odala (Bahgeri Dhulbahante), a Dhulbahante subclan

== See also ==
- Khaira (disambiguation)
