= Thankakudam =

- Directed by: S. S. Rajan
- Written by: Moithu Padiyathu
- Screenplay by: Moithu Padiyathu
- Starring: Prem Nazir; Sheela; Adoor Bhasi; T. S. Muthaiah
- Cinematography: P. Bhaskara Rao
- Edited by: G. Venkittaraman
- Music by: M. S. Baburaj
- Production company: Iqbal Pictures
- Distributed by: Iqbal Pictures
- Release date: 28 May 1965
- Country: India
- Language: Malayalam

Thankakudam (transl. Golden Pot) is a 1965 Indian Malayalam film, directed by S. S. Rajan. The film stars Prem Nazir, Sheela, Adoor Bhasi and T. S. Muthaiah in the lead roles. The film had musical score by M. S. Baburaj.

== Cast ==
- Prem Nazir
- Sheela
- Adoor Bhasi
- T. S. Muthaiah
- Ambika
- Yashoda Palayad
- Haji Abdul Rahman
- Nilambur Ayisha
- Philomina
- Santhosh Kumar

== Soundtrack ==
All lyrics are written by P. Bhaskaran; all music is composed by Baburaj.

No.	Title	Artist(s)	Length
1.	"Kozhikkottangaadeele"	Mehboob
2.	"Madhurikkum Maathala" (Pathos)	S. Janaki
3.	"Madhurikkum Maathalappazhamaanu"	S. Janaki
4.	"Malayalathil Pennilla"	L. R. Eswari, Choir
5.	"Mandaarappunchiri"	K. P. Udayabhanu
6.	"Padachavan Valarthunnua"	K. J. Yesudas
7.	"Yesunaayaka Deva"	P. Susheela, Kamukara Purushothaman
