= Raktharakshassu 3D =

- Film poster
- Directed by: Rupesh Paul
- Screenplay by: Sherin Catherine
- Story by: Rupesh Paul
- Produced by: 3Dreams International
- Starring: Madhu; Ananya; Sunny Wayne; Niyas Mussliyar
- Cinematography: K. P. Nambiathiri
- Release date: 28 February 2014
- Language: Malayalam

Raktharakshassu 3D is a 2014 Malayalam-language film by Rupesh Paul, starring Madhu, Sunny Wayne, Ananya and Niyas Mussliyar. The film is based on a Malayalam short story by Rupesh Paul.

== Plot ==
The plot revolves around a renowned writer, his wife who is a fashion designer and their 7-year-old daughter. Upon insistence by his fun-loving wife, he plans a family vacation at an island called Bungalow. They are also joined by the wife's uncle. As the story unfolds, the film presents the most bizarre family ever known.

== Cast ==
- Sunny Wayne
- Ananya
- Madhu
- Jubil Rajan P Dev
- Krishna Prasad
- Baby Gowri
- Chembil Asokan
- Niyaz
- Kulappulli Leela
- Sunil Sukhada
- Krishna Prasad
- Hima
- Binoy
- Master Vivas
- Deepika

== Release ==
The film was later dubbed and released in Tamil as Yaar Ival.

== See also ==
- List of Malayalam horror films
