= Vadakkan =

2025 Indian-Malayalam language film

- Theatrical release poster
- Directed by: Sajeed A.
- Screenplay by: Unni R.
- Story by: Sajeed A.
- Produced by: Jaideep Singh; Bhavya Nidhi Sharma; Kanupriya Gupta
- Starring: Kishore; Shruthy Menon; Merin Philip
- Cinematography: Keiko Nakahara
- Edited by: Sooraj E. S.
- Music by: Bijibal
- Production company: Offbeet Studios
- Distributed by: Dream Big Films
- Release dates: April 2024 (Brussels); March 7, 2025 (India)
- Country: India
- Language: Malayalam
- Budget: ₹3.65 crore

Vadakkan is a 2025 Indian Malayalam-language supernatural thriller film directed by Sajeed A. and written by Unni R. It stars Kishore, Shruthy Menon and Merin Philip in the lead roles. It is produced by Jaideep Singh and Bhavya Nidhi Sharma under the banner Offbeet Studios. Keiko Nakahara handles the cinematography and Sooraj E. S. edits the film. Bijibal composed the songs and background score. Sound designed by Resul Pookutty and Robin Kunjukutty did the re-recording mix.

Vadakkan was an official selection at Brussels International Fantastic Film Festival and Salerno Film Festival. It was screened at Marché du Film on 21 May 2024. Vadakkan was released theatrically on 7 March 2025.

== Plot ==
The story revolves around a paranormal investigator who approached to unravel a series of brutal murders on a reality television show, he uncovers dark secrets tied to an ancient cult ritual that dates back to the Indus Valley Civilisation of more than 4000 years ago. As he delves deeper, he comes face-to-face with a deadly spirit from Dravidian folklore, which plunges him into a world filled with terrifying revelations.

== Cast ==
- Kishore as Raman Perumalayan
- Shruthy Menon as Megha Nambiar
- Merin Philip as Anna Joseph
- Krishna Sankar as R. K. Ravi
- Kalesh Ramanand as Narayanan
- Garggi Ananthan as Alina
- Meenakshi Unnikrishnan as Meera
- Maala Parvathi as Ayesha
- Ravi Venkatraman as Joseph
- Sirajudheen Nazar as Bejoy
- Greeshma Alex as Tashu
- Krisheka Patel as Lakshmi
- Aryan Kathuria as Shambhu

== Music ==
Vadakkan

Soundtrack album by Bijibal Zeb Bangash
- Recorded: 2024–25
- Genre: Feature film soundtrack
- Language: Malayalam
- Label: Offbeet Music

The score for Vadakkan was composed by Bijibal. The soundtrack was composed by Bijibal and Zeb Bangash. The first single Kettingo was released on 17 February 2025. The second single Mayyath Rap released on 1 March 2025 and the third single Rang Likha released on 5 March 2025.

No.	Title	Lyrics	Music	Singer(s)	Length
1.	"Kettingo"	B. K. Harinarayanan	Bijibal	Bhadra Rajin	4:48
2.	"Mayyath Rap"	MC Couper	Bijibal	MC Couper, Greeshma Alex	2:34
3.	"Rang Likha"	Shellee	Zeb Bangash, Bijibal	Zeb Bangash	2:11

== Release ==
=== Theatrical ===
Vadakkan was initially screened at Marché du Film, Cannes on 21 May 2024. The official trailer of the film was released on 21 February 2025. The film was released in theatres on 7 March 2025.

=== Home media ===
The digital streaming rights of Vadakkan's Malayalam, English, Tamil, Kannada versions were acquired by Amazon Prime Video and Telugu and Tamil versions by Aha.

== Reception ==
Vadakkan received mixed to positive reviews from critics.

Anjana George of The Times of India gave 3/5 and wrote "It is a one-time watch for its technical brilliance and some genuinely eerie moments. But with stronger writing and a deeper exploration of the socio-cultural balancing act rooted in the caste history that Theyyam represents, it could have been so much more." Shilpa Nair Anand of The Hindu wrote "It is the kind of film that one has to pay close attention to because it is not a simple horror film with typical thrills, chills and sound effects. Which, by the way, there is plenty of in the film."

== Accolades ==
- Best Supernatural Thriller Award at the Fright Night Film Fest 2024
- Best Feature Film at the Autumn Edition of RED Movie Awards 2024, Reims
- Kerala Film Critics Association Award for Best Sound - Resul Pookutty, Lijo N. James, Robin Kunjukutty
- Official selection at 40th Brussels International Fantastic Film Festival (BIFFF)
- Official selection at Echelon Studios International Film Festival, Los Angeles
- Official selection at Abruzzo Horror Film Festival, L’Aquila
- Official selection at 78th Festival del cinema di Salerno
