= The Vanishing Act =

The Vanishing Act : The Untold Story of the Missing Malaysian Plane
- Directed by: Rupesh Paul
- Based on: Malaysia Airlines flight 370
- Produced by: Rupesh Paul
- Cinematography: Sajeesh Raj
- Production companies: Academy Award Long Li Productions, Ltd
- Country: India
- Language: English

The Vanishing Act: The Untold Story of the Missing Malaysian Plane is an unreleased English-language feature film from India inspired by the events surrounding the disappearance of Malaysia Airlines Flight 370 to be directed by Rupesh Paul.

== Production ==
The expected shooting duration is about 35 days in India, and 15 days in Los Angeles/Malaysia. With The Vanishing Act, Rupesh Paul wants to explore the new galore of technologies and their effect on the human brain, which have not been explored before.

The film's trailer was shown at the 2014 Cannes Film Festival to seek co-producers for the film. The film reportedly has received offers for co-production from China and Malaysia. When asked, the director said he had rushed the teaser for the sake of Cannes, and afterwards issued an unconditional apology for the fictional love-triangle portrayed in the teaser, and the press was told that he wished a film to be released by September. A completed film is expected for as early as an August release.

The Official Logo of the feature film was released at the AFM 2014 recently by Rupesh Paul.

== Criticism ==
A teaser of the film was released at the 2014 Cannes Film Festival, and received an adverse reaction from social and mainstream media. The film has been heavily criticised for not being considerate towards the families of the individuals onboard Malaysia Airlines Flight 370.
