= Kismath (2016 film) =

- Theatrical release poster
- Directed by: Shanavas K Bavakutty
- Written by: Shanavas K Bavakutty
- Produced by: Rajeev Ravi
- Starring: Shane Nigam; Shruthy Menon; Vinay Forrt; Anand Bal
- Cinematography: Suresh Rajan
- Edited by: B. Ajith Kumar; Jithin Manohar
- Music by: Sushin Shyam; Sumesh Parameshwar; Shamej Sreedhar
- Production company: Pattam Cinema Company
- Distributed by: LJ Films
- Release date: 29 July 2016
- Running time: 103 minutes
- Country: India
- Language: Malayalam

Kismath (from kismet; transl. Fate/destiny) is a 2016 Indian Malayalam-language romantic drama film written and directed by Shanavas K Bavakutty (in his directorial debut). The film stars Shane Nigam as Irfan and Shruthy Menon as Anita, two star-crossed lovers from different religious backgrounds (Islam and Hinduism). It is produced by Rajeev Ravi under the Pattam Cinema Company banner, in association with LJ Films and Akbar Travels.

The film narrates the real-life story of two young lovers from Ponnani, in Kerala - a 28-year-old scheduled caste girl and a 23-year-old Muslim boy - who faced backlash from society for their relationship in 2011. The screenplay was conceived by Bavakutty while serving as the town's Municipal Councillor.

A trailer was released on 20 July 2016. The film was released on 29 July 2016. The film was a commercial success.

== Cast ==
- Shane Nigam as Irfan
- Shruthy Menon as Anitha
- Vinay Forrt as Sub Inspector Ajay C Menon
- Alencier Ley Lopez as Sayed Bava Thangal
- Sajitha Madathil as the warden
- Surabhi Lakshmi as Saleena
- P. Balachandran as Appu Nair
- Sunil Sukhada as Assistant Sub Inspector Nair
- Anand Bahl as Plaza Khaleel
- Anil Nedumangad as Mohanan
- Vijayan Karanthoor as K T
- Jayaprakash Kuloor as Aboo
- Binoy Nambala as Shihab
- Abu Salih as Irfan's friend

== Soundtrack ==
Kismath

Soundtrack album by Sushin Shyam, Sumesh Parameshwar, Shamej Sreedhar
- Released: 22 July 2016
- Genre: Feature film soundtrack
- Length: 22:06
- Label: Muzik247

Sushin Shyam chronology
Lord Livingstone 7000 Kandi (2015)	Kismath (2016)	Ezra (2017)

No.	Title	Lyrics	Music	Artist(s)	Length
1.	"Kisa Paathiyil"	Anwar Ali	Sushin Shyam	Sachin Balu	3:27
2.	"Nilamanaltharikalil"	Rafeeq Ahamed	Sumesh Parameswar	K. S. Harisankar, Sreya Raghav	3:51
3.	"Loneliness"	-	Sumesh Parameswar	Sreya Raghav	1:33
4.	"Chilathunaam"	Anwar Ali	Shamej Shreedhar	Madhushree Narayan	5:05
5.	"Aane Madanapoo"	Moyinkutty Vaidyar	Traditional	Kabeer Nallalam	3:17
6.	"Vinnu Churanna"	Anwar Ali	Sumesh Parameswar	M. P. Neesa	3:29
7.	"Theme Music"		Sumesh Parameswar	Shreya Raghav	1:24

== Awards and nominations ==
- Winner - Filmfare Critics Award for Best Actress – Malayalam - Shruthy Menon
- Nominated - Filmfare Award for Best Actress – Malayalam - Shruthy Menon
- Nominated - Filmfare Award for Best Music Director – Malayalam - Sushin Shyam
