= Sreya Raghav =

Indian playback singer

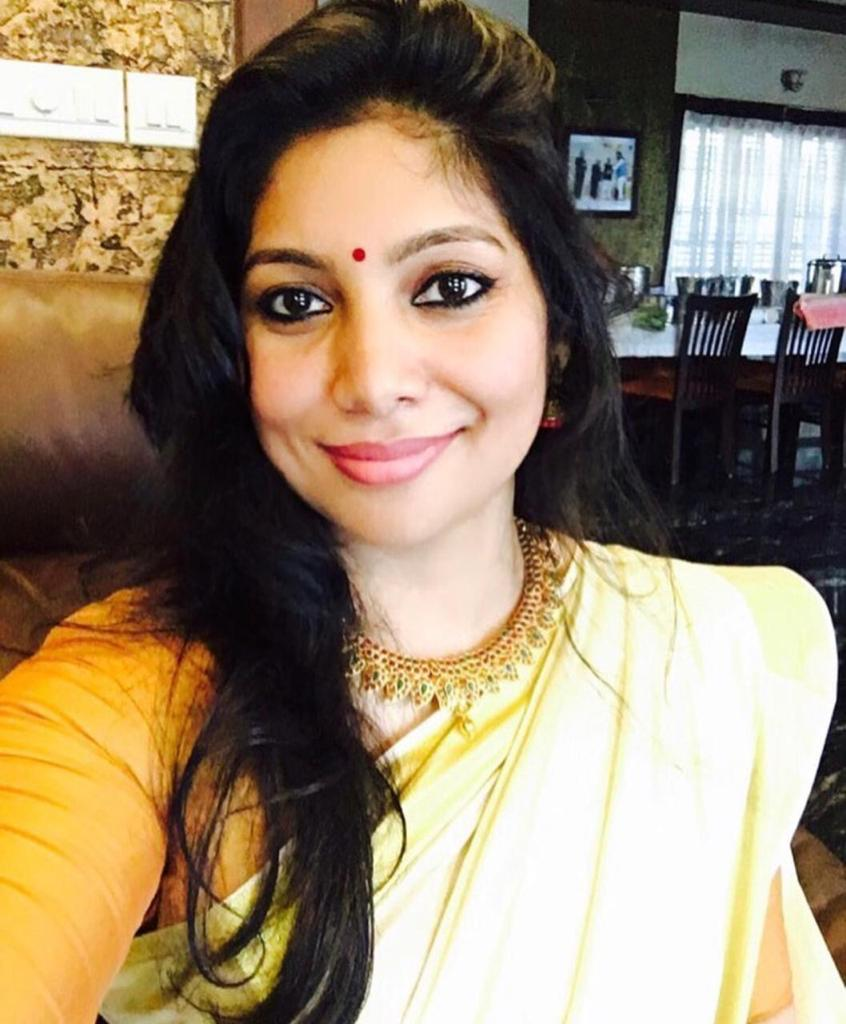
- Born: Abu Dhabi, United Arab Emirates
- Occupation: Playback singing
- Mother: Palayad Yashoda

Sreya Raghav is an Indian playback singer. She was born in Abu Dhabi and is the daughter of yesteryear singer/actress Palayad Yashoda.

Sreya's song Nilamanaltharikalil appeared in the soundtrack for the Malayalam movie Kismath.

== Career ==
Raghav was introduced to the Malayalam film industry by Gopi Sundar.

She has sung the background tracks for films such as Left Right Left and 5 Sundarikal.

== Filmography ==
Year	Song	Film	Notes
2013	Ekaantham	5 Sundarikal	Debut
2013	Kanavinum	Arikil Oraal	
2016	Nilamanaltharikalil	Kismath	
2016	Loneliness	Kismath	
2016	Theme Song	Kismath	
2017	Theru There	Role Models	
2018	Thotteduthaal	Kaanthaaram	
