= Sreevalsan J. Menon =

Dr. Sreevalsan J. Menon
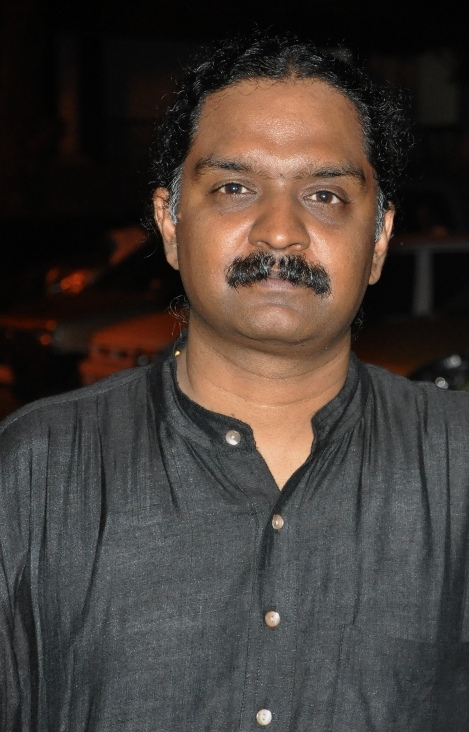

Background information
- Born: Trichur, Kerala
- Origin: Kunissery, Palakkad, Kerala, India
- Genres: Classical; Carnatic
- Occupations: Singer, composer
- Years active: 2001-present

Sreevalsan J. Menon is an Indian Carnatic vocalist and a music composer from Kerala.

== Biography ==
After initial training under Rajalakshmi Krishnan (disciple of Chembai Vaidyanatha Bhagavathar) and the violinist T.V. Ramani at Thrissur, Menon had much of his advanced tutelage under the late Neyyattinkara Vasudevan. Menon is an 'A TOP' grade artist of All India Radio and has given concerts all over the country including the National Concerts of AIR and Doordarshan. He has received several awards including Kerala Sangeetha Nataka Akademi Award 2013, from the Madras Music Academy, and a title from Krishna Gana Sabha, also in Chennai, besides such institutions of repute in the Deccan. He has also participated in Music Transcends, a symphony held at Washington, D.C., in 2004, integrating Western and Indian classical music. His jugalbandis with Hindustani vocalist Ramesh Narayan and late Kathakali musicians Kalamandalam Sankaran Embranthiri and Kalamandalam Hyderali have been widely appreciated.

Menon's songs "I Be Here" and "I Have Secrets", as well as his background score for the film Saint Dracula 3D, were shortlisted and in contention for the Songs and Original Score categories of the 85th Academy Awards.

The background score by Sreevalsan for the film Ottaal, which won the Crystal Bear at the Berlin International Film Festival in 2016, was praised for its laid back music in the award citation.

He was awarded the "Best Music Director" prize for the television series "Etho Janma Kalpanayil" in the Asianet Television Awards of 2024.

Sreevalsan is a speaker on the topic of music. As a TEDx speaker, he has presented his proposition on the ten most popular music scales worldwide.

== Personal life ==
Menon is married and has a daughter and a son.

== Career ==
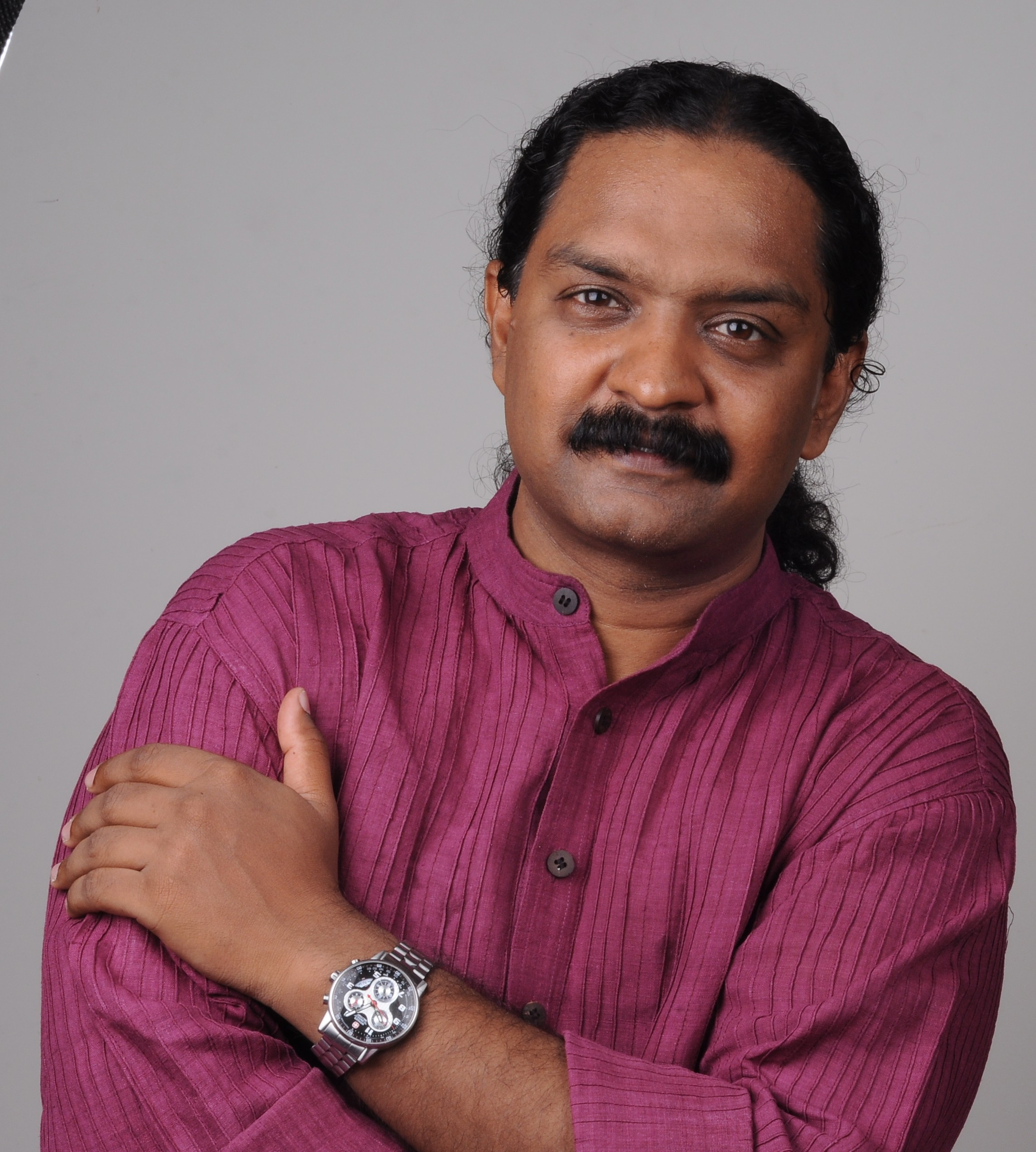

Menon's music albums include Vanaprastham, a musical interpretation of the famous short story by M.T. Vasudevan Nair; Monsoon Anuraga a musical experience on monsoon rains. Vismaya, a fantasy video album featuring Artist Namboodiri, M T Vasudevan Nair and menon himself.

Sreevalsan has directed more than 100 agricultural technology dissemination videos. He currently specializes in studying and documenting rituals, folklore, folk art forms and other cultural ethos in relation to the agricultural history of Kerala under the project cult, culture and agriculture. Some of the prominent works that have been directed by him include Padayaniyum Karshika Samskrithiyum, Mayilpeeli Thookkam/ Arjuna Nritham, Mudiyett and Annam The Swan.

== Filmography ==
| Year | Film | Language | Notes |
|---|---|---|---|
| 2008 | My Mother's Laptop | Malayalam | |
| 2010 | T. D. Dasan Std. VI B | Malayalam | |
| 2012 | Saint Dracula 3D | English | Shortlisted for Oscar Award for Best Song and Best Background Score |
| 2014 | London Bridge | Malayalam | |
| 2014 | Swapaanam | Malayalam | |
| 2014 | Vidooshakan | Malayalam | |
| 2015 | Loham | Malayalam | |
| 2015 | Ottaal | Malayalam | Background Score |
| 2015 | Priyamanasam | Malayalam | |
| 2015 | Amoeba | Malayalam | Background Score |
| 2015 | Anarkali | Malayalam | Song: Over N Over |
| 2016 | Edavappathy | Malayalam | Background Score |
| 2017 | Nilavariyathe | Malayalam | Background Score |
| 2017 | The great Indian road journey | | Background Score |
| 2018 | Appuvinte Sathyanweshanam | Malayalam | Background Score |
| 2018 | Padmini (film) | Malayalam | Music & Background Score |
| 2019 | Run Kalyani | Malayalam | Background Score |
| 2019 | Kenjira | Malayalam | Music & Background Score |
| 2019 | Gramavrikshathile Kuyil | Malayalam | Lead Actor, Music & Background Score |
| 2019 | John | Malayalam | Background Score |
| 2022 | Khedda (film) | Malayalam | Music |
| 2024 | Varshangalkku Shesham | Malayalam | Singer - "Jeevithagaadhakale" |

== Albums ==
- Krishna - A Musical Reflection
- Vanaprastham
- Kshetranjali
- Monsoon Anuraga
- Classical Encounters - with guru Sri. Neyyatinkara Vasudevan
- Vismaya - Emotional Expressions: audio & music video album with Bini Panicker
- Manasa Smarami
- Madhuram Gayati
- Ananda Poonkatru
- Sree Guruvayurappan Gananjali : Vol - 3
- Jugal Bandi : Vol 1 & 2 - with Kalamandalam Shankaran Embranthiri & Meledam Narayanan
- Sringaram
- Begane Baro
- Ramanan
- Bhavayami
- Navarasa Thillana
- Irayimman Thampi Kritis
- Rituleela
- Hare
- Swami Ayyappan
- The genius of Kunjan Nambiar
- Yamuna
- Ramayana Geetham
- Hridhi
- Advaita Dasa Kritis
- Tambura Hymns
- Poornathrayeesham Ashraye
