= Khed Temple =

Hindu temple in Rajasthan, India

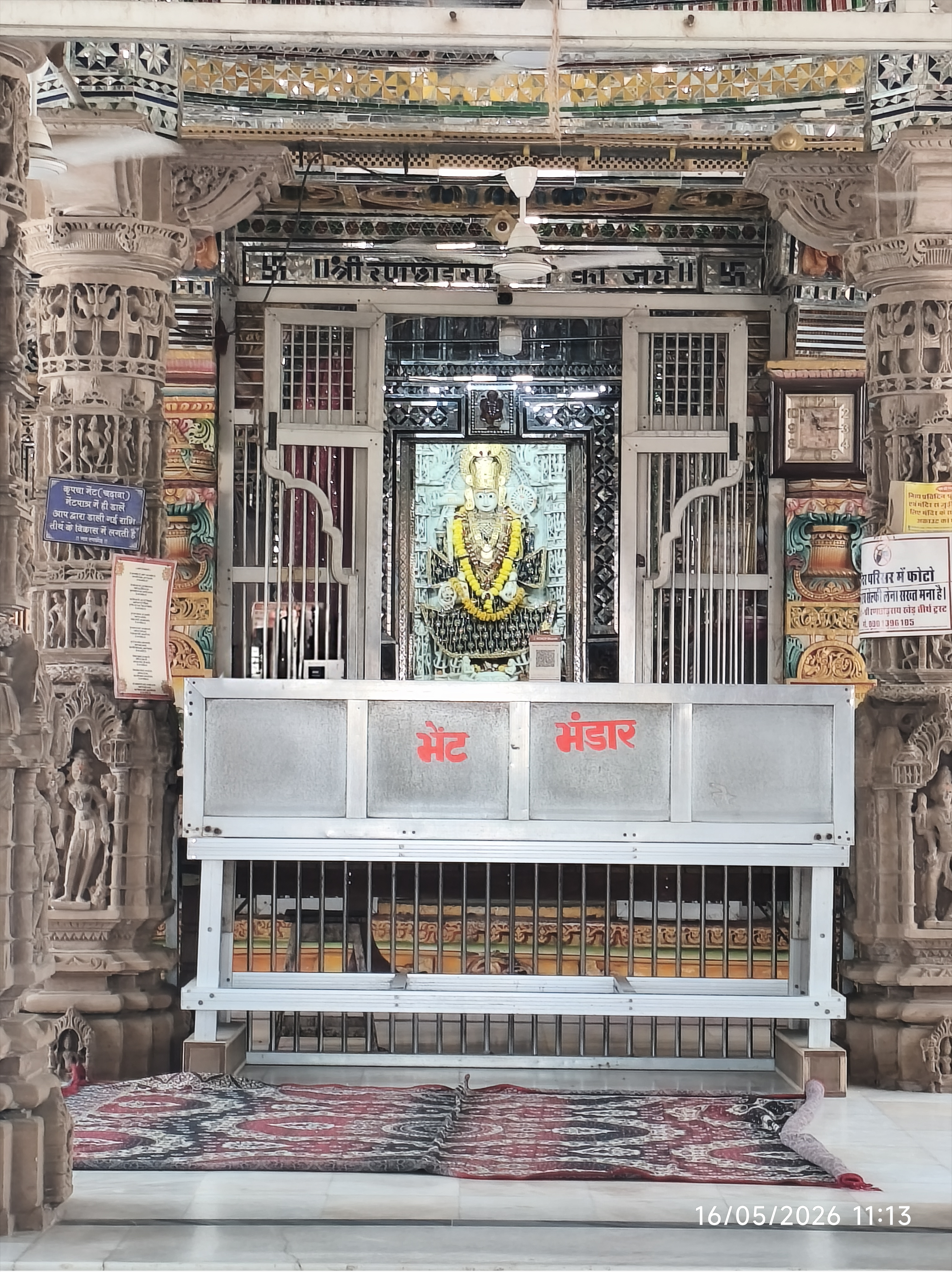
- Ranchhor Rai

- Location within Rajasthan Location within India

Religion
- Affiliation: Hinduism
- District: Balotra district
- Deity: krishna

Location
- Location: Balotra
- State: Rajasthan
- Country: India
- Interactive map of Khed Temple
- Coordinates: 25°51′47″N 72°10′20″E

Architecture
- Established: 300 AD

Khed Temple, popularly known as the Kher Ranchhoreray Krishna Temple, is located in Khed, Balotra district of Rajasthan.

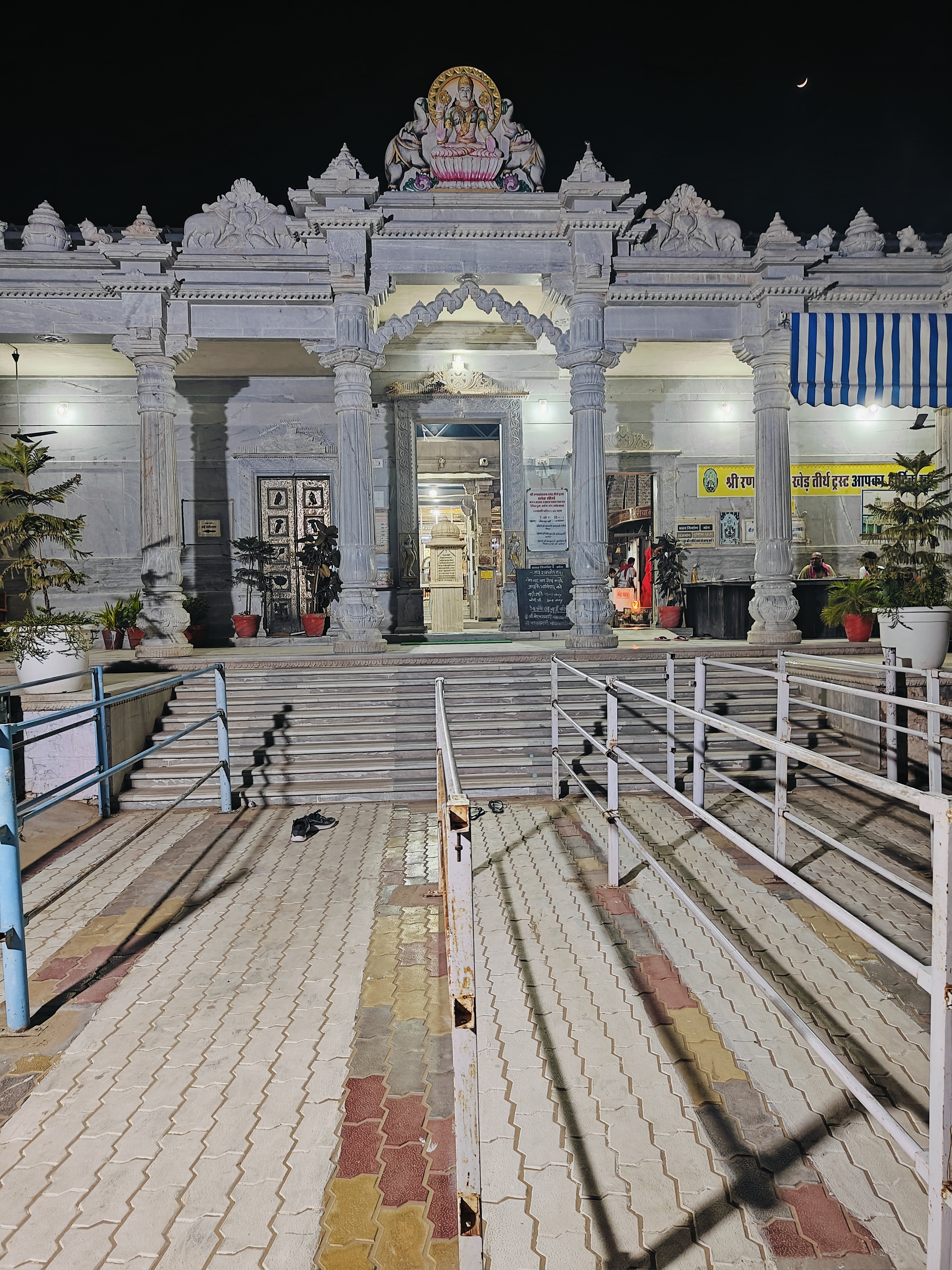
Khed Temple Ranchhor Rai

== Worship ==
The temple is noted for its distinctive role as a site dedicated to the worship of Krishna.

== History ==
Regarded as a Sanatan pilgrimage site, it is believed to have been established in the 12th century Vikram Samvat.

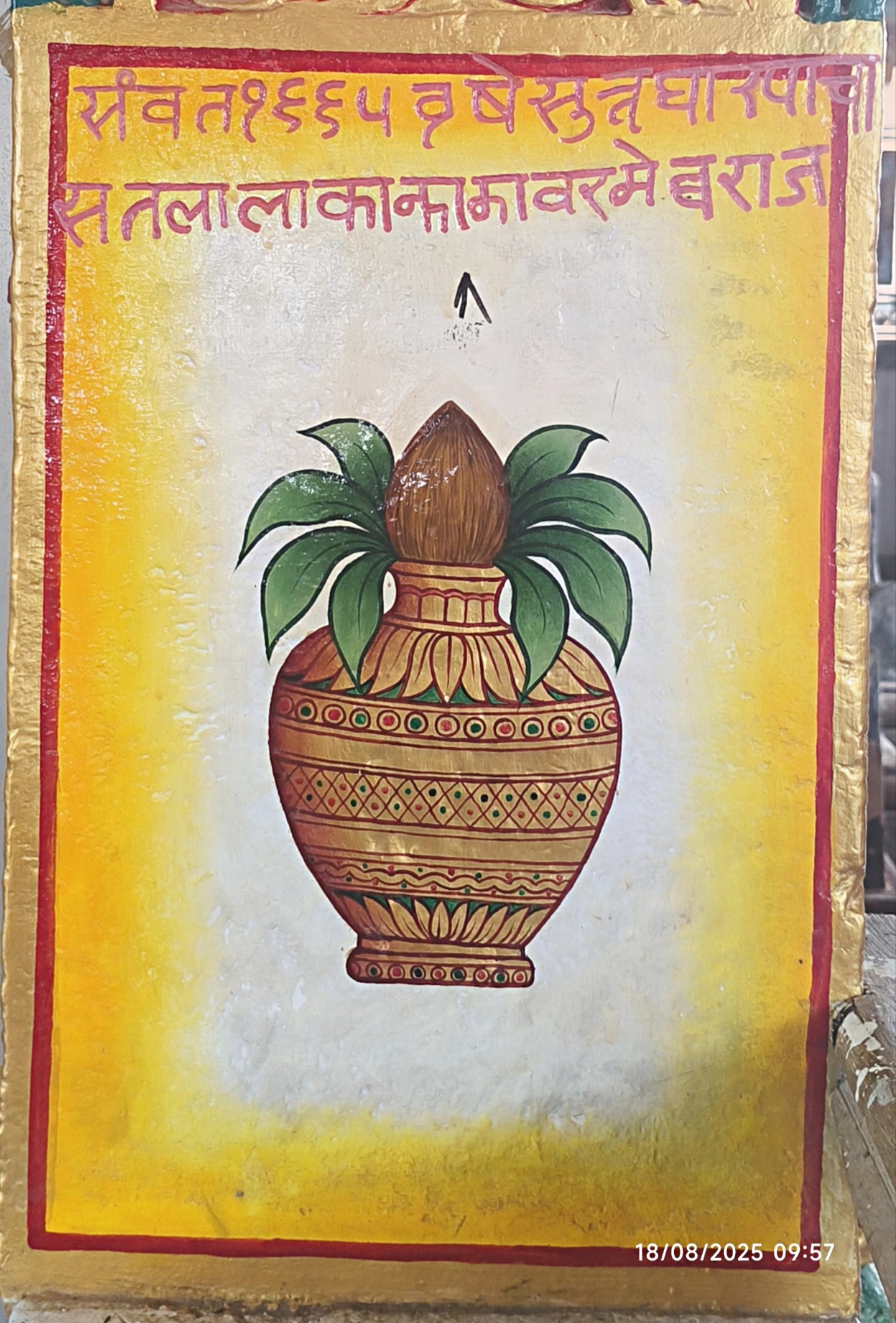
Khed Temple Date established

Located in the Balotra district of Rajasthan, it hosts one of the largest Annakoot fairs in the Jodhpur division on Kartik Purnima. The site is visited throughout the year by devotees from various parts of India who come to take part in religious practices associated with Shri Ranchod Roy Bhagwan.
