= Garggi Ananthan =

Indian theatre and film artist

- Born: Thiruvananthapuram, Kerala, India
- Education: Pondicherry University
- Occupation: Actress
- Years active: 2019–present

Garggi Ananthan is an Indian actress and theatre artist known for her works in Malayalam cinema and theatre. She made her film debut in 2019 with the Malayalam film Run Kalyani, for which she won the Best Actress award at the New York Indian Film Festival.

== Early life ==
Garggi was born in Thiruvananthapuram to Ananthan and Maryan. After finishing her degree from School of Drama and Fine Arts, Garggi completed the post graduation in Master of Performing Arts from Pondicherry University.

== Career ==
Garggi made her film acting debut with the Malayalam film Run Kalyani in 2019. Following her debut, Garggi appeared in Gramavrikshathile Kuyil, the anthology Normal, Ekan Anekan, Narayaneente Moonnaanmakkal and Vadakkan. She has also acted in Chera, directed by Lijin Jose, which is yet to be released.

== Filmography ==
Key
†	Denotes films that have not yet been released

Year	Title	Role	Notes	Ref.
2019	Run Kalyani	Kalyani		
2021	Oru Paathiraa Swapnam Pole	Theertha	Short film	
2021	Naan		Music video	
2021	Kulsummante Perakutty	Hana	Short film	
2022	Pandemic		Short film	
2022	Gramavrikshathile Kuyil	Bhanumathi Amma		
2022	Ayana	Ayana	Part of anthology film Normal	
2022	Ekan Anekan	Minnu		
2024	Yakshi Katha	Sita and Surasa	Short film	
2025	Narayaneente Moonnaanmakkal	Athira		
2025	Vadakkan	Alina		
TBA	Chera †			

== Awards and nominations ==
Year	Award	Category	Nominated work	Result	Ref.
2019	Mahindra Excellence in Theatre Awards	Best Actor in a Lead Role (Female)	Pulijanmam	Nominated	
2019	New York Indian Film Festival	Best Actress	Run Kalyani	Won	
2022	Prem Nazir Foundation Short Film Awards	Best Actress	Pandemic	Won	
2022	Kerala Film Critics Association Awards	Best Supporting Actress	Ekan Anekan	Won	
