= Chippy (film) =

2017 film directed by Pradeep Chokli

Chippy is a 2017 Malayalam language film produced by B S Babu under the banner of Film Finity Productions.The film stars Srinda Arhaan, Joy Mathew and Sruthi Menon in the lead roles, along with Surabhi Lakshmi, Salim Kumar, Indrans, Vijilesh and Manikandan R Achari. The film is directed by Pradeep Chokli, while the music is composed by Sachin Balu. The screenplay is based on a Vineesh Palayadu story. It was nominated for the 2018 Kerala State children film awards.

== Plot ==
Chippy is the story of a group of schoolchildren from Thalassery, a coastal region in Kerala. They plan to make a short film portraying their lives. The story is about the life of Shobha, who is the mother of one of the children. She will lose her husband who was the only breadwinner for the family. Later she has to sell all her hens and her home to survive. The film also portrays that their condition is so dire that the children even asks her whether she would sell them too. Later she and her children have to seek respite in a school building. There is a woman who sells "Kaya varuthathu" in the area who regularly helps them with everything. She is chosen to play the role of Shobha when they plan to make a short film to portray Shobha's life and the difficulties faced by the children.

== Cast ==
- Srinda Arhaan
- Surabhi Lakshmi
- Shruthy Menon
- Joy Mathew
- Salim Kumar
- Vijilesh
- Manju Sunichen
- Amaldev
- Ajmal
- Adwaijith
- Adwaith
- Swathy
- Thanha
- Sivani
- Indrans
- Manikandan R Achari
- Muthumani

== Soundtrack ==
The music is composed by Sachin Balu along with K S Chitra, P Jayachandran and Sreya Jayadeep.

- "Maarivillukale"- Sooryagayathri
- "Nilakkadalayum Korichirikkana"- Sreya Jayadeep
- "Munthirichaarum"- P Jayachandran
- "Kadal Shankhinullil"- K S Chithra
