= Gramavrikshathile Kuyil =

2022 Malayalam film

- Official release poster
- Directed by: K.P. Kumaran
- Written by: K.P. Kumaran
- Starring: Srevalsan J Menon; Pramod Raman; Gargi Ananthan; Rahul Rajagopal
- Cinematography: K.G. Jayan; Santhosh Raman
- Production company: Far Sight Media
- Release date: 8 April 2022
- Country: India
- Language: Malayalam

Gramavrikshathile Kuyil (transl. Koel in the village tree) is a 2022 Indian-language Malayalam movie directed by K P Kumaran and produced under Far Sight Media. It features Srevalsan J Menon, Pramod Raman, Gargi Ananthan, Rahul Rajagopal as the main leads. The film was released on 8 April 2022.

== Cast ==
- Srevalsan J Menon
- Pramod Raman
- Garggi Ananthan
- Rahul Rajagopal

== Production ==
The film, which was completed in 2010. and released on 8 April 2022. The film is biopic on renowned poet Kumaran Asan

== Reception ==
The film was released on 8 April 2022. S.R.Praveen critic of The Hindu wrote that " Poetry is the redeeming factor". A critic from ManoramaOnline gave mixture of review.
