= Sarayu Mohan =

Indian actress (born 1989)

- Born: 10 July 1989 (age 36); Thrippunithura, Kerala, India
- Other name: Ammu
- Occupations: Actress; dancer; host
- Years active: 2006–present
- Spouse: Sanal V. Devan (m. 2016)

Sarayu Mohan (born 10 July 1989) is an Indian actress who appears in Malayalam films and television shows. She made her debut in the lead role with the movie Kappal Muthalaali in 2009.

== Film career ==
Sarayu started her career by doing minor roles in movies like Chakkara Muthu and Veruthe Oru Bharya. Her debut movie in a lead role was Kappal Muthalaali directed by Thaha. Her next movie was Chekavar, in which she played the protagonist Gauri. She paired with Bala in Sahasram, and in Four Friends with Kunjakko boban. She played a negative character in Four Friends. She also appeared in Kanyakumari Express by TS Sureshbabu and Inganeyum Oraal. Karayilekku Oru Kadal Dooram was the movie in which she acted as Indrajith's wife. She did a guest appearance in Orkut Oru Ormakoot with Siddique. In Janapriyan alongside Jayasurya, Bhama and Manoj K Jayan, she played the role of Revathi which was a notable character. In Nadakame Ulakam, directed by Viji Thampi, she acted with Mukesh. She did a major role in Nidra, a directional venture of Sidharth Bharathan. She has worked in Husbands in Goa, alongside Asif Ali, Jayasurya and Indrajith, in which she appeared as a sly seductive girl, out for trapping men. She received many criticisms, both positive and negative, for this role. She had a guest role in Housefull, directed by Linson Antony. Meanwhile, she also stepped into Tamil through the movie Thee Kulikkum Pachai Maram.

Recently she directed a short film, Pacha, which has the voice by actress Bhama. There are songs in the film, and a poem sung by the actress Ananya.

== Personal life ==
Sarayu married Sanal V. Devan on 12 November 2016.

== Filmography ==
List of Sarayu Mohan film credits
Year	Film	Role	Language	Notes	Ref.
2006	Chakkara Muthu	Dhanya	Malayalam		
2007	Monjulla Painkili	Heroine	Malayalam	Album	
2008	Veruthe Oru Bharya	Betty	Malayalam		
2008	Sultan	Neena	Malayalam		
2008	Azhagotha Maina	Heroine	Malayalam	Album	
2009	Kappal Muthalaali	Radhika	Malayalam	Debut film as heroine	
2009	Mounam	Unknown	Malayalam		
2010	Chekavar	Gauri	Malayalam		
2010	Nizhal	Malavika	Malayalam		
2010	Inganeyum Oral	Meera	Malayalam		
2010	Four Friends	Vineetha	Malayalam		
2010	Kanyakumari Express	Hema	Malayalam		
2010	Karayilekku Oru Kadal Dooram	Meera	Malayalam		
2010	Sahasram	Yamuna	Malayalam		
2010	Kungumam	Heroine	Malayalam	Album	
2011	Nadakame Ulakam	Usha	Malayalam		
2011	Janapriyan	Revathy	Malayalam		
2011	Naayika	Vani	Malayalam		
2011	Bombay Mittayi	Smitha	Malayalam		
2011	Snehaadaram	Unknown	Malayalam		
2012	Orkut Oru Ormakoot	Unknown	Malayalam	Cameo appearance	
2012	Padmasree Bharat Dr. Saroj Kumar	Actress	Malayalam	Special appearance in the song "KESU"	
2012	Husbands in Goa	Saniya	Malayalam		
2012	Nidra	Priya	Malayalam		
2012	Hero	Dharmarajan master's daughter	Malayalam		
2012	Banking Hours 10 to 4	Ajay's lover	Malayalam		
2012	Bhoomiyude Avakashikal	Rema	Malayalam		
2012	Karmayodha	Nursing student	Malayalam		
2013	Housefull	Customer of the day care centre	Malayalam	Cameo appearance	
2013	Radio	Priya	Malayalam		
2013	Money Back Policy	Urmila	Malayalam		
2013	Thee Kulikkum Pachai Maram	Chandrika	Tamil		
2013	Tourist Home	Anitha	Malayalam		
2013	Pacha	Unknown	Malayalam	Short film	
2014	Thomson Villa	Anu	Malayalam		
2014	Konthayum Poonoolum	Rosemary Rose	Malayalam		
2014	Onnum Mindathe	Rose	Malayalam		
2014	Varsham	Nandini's sister	Malayalam		
2014	Avarude Veedu	—N/a	Malayalam		
2014	Bad Boys	—N/a	Malayalam		
2015	Namukkore Aakasham	Mini	Malayalam		
2015	Salt Mango Tree	Meenakshi Mohan	Malayalam		
2015	Ente Cinema - Movie Festival	Cinema Actress	Malayalam		
2015	One Second Please	—N/a	Malayalam		
2015	Celebrate Happiness	Herself	Malayalam	Album	
2016	Ente Vellithooval	Sr. Merina	Malayalam		
2016	Kaavalal	—N/a	Malayalam	Short film	
2017	Si3	Mrs. Ananda Rao	Tamil		
2017	Sherlock Toms	Magistrate	Malayalam		
2017	Aakashamittayee	Rekha	Malayalam		
2018	Marubhoomiiyle Mazhathullikal	Anitha	Malayalam		
2018	Aanakkallan	Nancy	Malayalam		
2019	Soothrakkaran	Damayanthi	Malayalam		
2019	Njan Petta Makan	Leena	Malayalam		
2019	O.P.160/18 Kakshi: Ammini Pilla	Marriage counselor	Malayalam		
2019	Fancy Dress	Wife in car	Malayalam	Cameo	
2019	Appuvinte Sathyeneshwanam	Savithri	Malayalam		
2019	Roudram 2018	—N/a	Malayalam		
2020	Rajavukku Check	Gowri Raja	Tamil		
2020	Shakeela	Shakeela	Malayalam	Short film	
2020	Akalam	Indu	Malayalam	Short film	
2020	Chamayangalude Sulthan	—N/a	Malayalam	Lyrics only Short film/Documentary	
2021	Vidhi: The Verdict	Treesa Sunny	Malayalam		
2022	Kannadi	-	Malayalam		
2022	Yaanai	Jayachandran’s wife	Tamil		
2022	Ullasam	Harry's aunt	Malayalam		
2022	Unknown	Wife	Malayalam	Short film	
2022	Khedda	Dance teacher	Malayalam		
2022	Sagunthalavin Kadhalan	-	Tamil	-	
2023	Khali Purse of Billionaires	Grace	Malayalam		
2023	Uppumavu		Malayalam		
2023	Within Seconds	Nisha	Malayalam		
2023	Kunjamminis Hospital	Susanna Johny	Malayalam		
2024	Thrayam	Ranjini	Malayalam		
2024	Choppu	Khadeeja	Malayalam		
2026	Faces	Dr. Smitha	Malayalam		

== Television ==
=== Serials ===
Year	Serial	Role	Channel	Notes	Ref.
2007	Velankani Mathavu	Julliet	Surya TV		
2007	Manaporutham	Sarayu	Surya TV		
2008	Enganeyundashane		Jaihind TV		
2015-2017	Eeran Nilavu	Nandana	Flowers TV		
2020	Ente Maathavu	Helen Valookkaran	Surya TV		
2023	Marimayam	Sumitra	Mazhavil Manorama		

=== Reality shows ===
Year	Program	Role	Channel	Notes	Ref.
2007	Thillana Thillana	Contestant	Surya TV		
2009	Sarigama	Participant	Asianet		
2010	Ente Priya Ganangal	Presenter	Surya TV		
2011	Vivel Big Break	Judge	Surya TV		
2012	Veruthe Alla Bharya	Dancer	Mazhavil Manorama		
2012	Munch Dance Dance	Judge	Asianet		
2013	Super Dancer	Judge	Amrita TV		
2013-2014	Yuvatharam	Judge	Jaihind TV		
2014	Let's Dance	Judge	Amrita TV		
2014	Vanitharatnam	Judge	Amrita TV		
2015	Smart Show	Participant	Flowers	Game show	
2015	Thani Nadan	Presenter	Mazhavil Manorama		
2015–2019	Comedy Stars	Celebrity Judge/Guest	Asianet		
2017	Vachakavum Pachakavum	Presenter	Kairali TV		
2018	Laughing Villa Season 2	Judge	Surya TV		
2018	Star War Season 2	Contestant	Surya TV		
2018-2019	Dance Kerala Dance	Contestant	Zee Keralam		
2019	Thakarppan Comedy	Host	Mazhavil Manorama		
2020	Kuttipattalam	Guest	Surya TV		
2021	Lets Rock N Roll	Host	Zee Keralam		
2021	Welcome 2021	Dancer	Kairali TV		
2021	Parayam Nedam	Participant	Amrita TV		
2021	Red Carpet	Mentor	Amrita TV		
2021	Madhuram Shobahanam	Dancer	Zee Keralam		
2022	Super Kudumbam	Mentor	Mazhavil Manorama		
2022	Bzinga Family Festival	Participant	Zee Keralam		
2023	Onnonnara Ruchi	Presenter	Zee Keralam		

She published a book titled Njyayaraazhchakale Snehicha Penkutty, meaning "Girl Who Loved Sundays", which contains her own collection of poems and stories.She has acted in few advertisements. She has performed in many stage shows in various countries. Before entering into the film field she anchored some television programmes.

She is associating with a group named "Disha" which does charitable activities.
