= The Road to Freedom (film) =

- Film poster
- Directed by: Brendan Moriarty
- Screenplay by: Thomas Shade; Margie Rogers
- Produced by: Brendan Moriarty; Henry Bronson
- Starring: Joshua Fredric Smith; Scott Maguire
- Cinematography: David Mun
- Edited by: Sean Halloran; Margie Rogers
- Music by: Austin Creek
- Production company: Endocom
- Distributed by: Creative Freedom
- Release dates: April 27, 2010 (Cannes Film Festival); September 30, 2011 (US: limited)
- Countries: United States; Cambodia
- Languages: English; Khmer
- Budget: $1 million

The Road to Freedom is a 2010 war film and the directorial debut of Brendan Moriarty. The film is inspired by the real-life story of photojournalist Sean Flynn, the son of Errol Flynn, who disappeared with fellow photojournalist Dana Stone in Cambodia in 1970. Joshua Fredric Smith portrays Sean and Scott Maguire portrays Dana.

The world premiere at the Cannes Film Market was on April 27, 2010. It was released in theaters in the United States on Sep 30th 2011 and was Rated R by the Motion Picture Association. In July 2011, Creative Freedom acquired the United States distribution rights and released the film on September 30, 2011.

== Plot ==
Two photojournalists, Sean (Joshua Fredric Smith) and Dana (Scott Maguire), who brave the jungles to get their story of war-torn Cambodia in 1970, are captured by Khmer Rouge guerrillas.

== Cast ==
- Joshua Fredric Smith as Sean
- Scott Maguire as Dana
- Tom Proctor as Francias
- Nhem Sokun as Lim Po
- Nhem Sokunthol as General
- Kanilen Kang as Mean
- Robert Malone as Lewis
