= College Girl (1974 film) =

Malayalam 1974 Film

- Directed by: Hariharan
- Written by: Dr. Balakrishnan
- Screenplay by: Dr. Balakrishnan
- Produced by: Dr. Balakrishnan
- Starring: Prem Nazir; Vidhubala; KP Ummer; Adoor Bhasi; Bahadoor; Sudheer
- Cinematography: T. N. Krishnankutty Nair
- Edited by: G. Venkittaraman
- Music by: A. T. Ummer
- Production company: Rekha Cine Arts
- Distributed by: Rekha Cine Arts
- Release date: 12 July 1974
- Country: India
- Language: Malayalam

College Girl is a 1974 Indian Malayalam film directed by Hariharan and produced by Dr. Balakrishnan. The film stars Prem Nazir, Vidhubala, KP Ummer, Bahadoor, Sudheer, Adoor Bhasi and Balakrishnan in the lead roles. The film has musical score by A. T. Ummer.

== Cast ==
- Prem Nazir as Rajan
- Vidhubala as Radha
- K. P. Ummer as Kunjahammadali Hajiyar
- Bahadoor as Damu
- Adoor Bhasi as Sukumaran
- Balakrishnan
- Jose Prakash as Nanu
- Manavalan Joseph
- Pattom Sadan as Hyder
- Sudheer as College Student
- Sadhana as Leela
- Prema as Vichaminia
- Sankaradi as Parakulam Raman Nair
- Cochin Haneefa as College Student
- Ramdas
- T. S. Muthaiah as Leela's Father
- Paul Vengola as Govindan
- Khadeeja as College Principal
- Meena as Meenakshi
- Paravoor Bharathan as Kittunni Ammavan
- Philomina as Professor / Principal Parukkuttyamma
- Karunan
- Saraswathi
- Unni
- Kumaran Nair
- Sebastian
- Premachandran
- Anjana Raja
- Balan Kovil
- Devnath
- Geetha (Old)
- Kanjangad Balakrishnan
- Muraleedharan
- P. C. Thomas
- Prajatha
- Pushpa
- Rajamma
- T. S. Radhamani
- Vimala Junior

== Soundtrack ==
The music was composed by A. T. Ummer and the lyrics were written by Dr. Balakrishnan.

No.	Song	Singers	Lyrics	Length (m:ss)
1	"Amrithaprabhaatham Virinju"	Chandrabhanu, Devi Chandran	Dr. Balakrishnan	
2	"Anjanamizhikal"	K. J. Yesudas, S. Janaki	Dr. Balakrishnan	
3	"Arikathu Njammalu Bannotte"	Yashoda Palayad	Dr. Balakrishnan	
4	"Chandanakkuriyitta"	K. J. Yesudas	Dr. Balakrishnan	
5	"Kingini Ketti"	K. J. Yesudas	Dr. Balakrishnan	
6	"Muthiyamma Pole Vannu"	P. Jayachandran, P. Madhuri, Chorus	Dr. Balakrishnan	
