= Brendan Moriarty =

Cambodian film director and producer

- Born: 1988 or 1989 (age 36–37)
- Occupations: Film director; producer

Brendan Moriarty (born June 1, 1989) is a Cambodian film director and producer. Moriarty directed his first film at the age of 20, The Road to Freedom, a war drama film about photojournalist Sean Flynn, who went missing in 1971 in Cambodia while on assignment for Time magazine.

Moriarty has also served as media advisor on numerous projects in Asia and around the world.
