= Khergarh =

Khergarh or Khedgarh may refer to:

- Khed, Rajasthan, a village in Rajasthan, India
- Tilwara, a village in Rajasthan, India

== See also ==
- Kher (disambiguation)
- Kheragarh, a town in Uttar Pradesh, India
