= Thee Kulikkum Pachai Maram =

2013 Indian film by M. Vineesh and M. Prabheesh

- Theatrical release poster
- Directed by: M. Vineesh; M. Prabheesh
- Written by: K. Goutham (dialogues)
- Screenplay by: M. Vineesh
- Story by: M. Vineesh
- Starring: Prajin; Sarayu
- Cinematography: Madhu Ambat
- Edited by: R. Rajalakshmi
- Music by: Jithan Roshan; Arunagiri (BGM)
- Production company: Millennium Visual Media
- Release date: 19 June 2013
- Running time: 112 minutes
- Country: India
- Language: Tamil

Thee Kulikkum Pachai Maram (transl. The green tree where fire bathes) is a 2013 Indian Tamil-language drama film directed by the duo M. Vineesh and M. Prabheesh, starring Prajin and Sarayu in her Tamil debut. The film went unnoticed at the box office.

== Plot ==
The film follows a man who lives in mortuary.

== Cast ==
- Prajin as Pandi
- Sarayu as Chandrika
- Nizhalgal Ravi
- M. S. Bhaskar
- T. P. Gajendran
- Raviram as Kanakaraj
- Vishwanth as Dorai
- Yogi Babu as Selvam
- Anand as Charlie
- Rishin Sali as Muthu
- Rekha Suresh as Saroja
- Aneesh G. Menon as Vaalie
- Joby as Maari

== Production ==
The film is directed by M. Vineesh and M. Prabheesh, who worked on many Malayalam documentaries. The film was initially shot as a short film but became a feature film after Samuthirakani saw the film and recommended the directors to shoot the film in both Malayalam and Tamil. The story is based on a true incident that happened in Kerala.

== Soundtrack ==
The music was composed by Jithan Roshan and the lyrics were written by Raji. The song "Kaddaikalile" is set in the Hindustani raga Reetigowla.

- "Dinamum" - Jithan Roshan
- "Kaddaikalile" - Yasin, Madhumitha R.
- "Narivaruthu" - Varsharanjith
- "Toputakkaru" - Murugan, Al Rufiyan
- "Toputakkaru (karaoke)"
- "Narivaruthu (karaoke)"

== Reception ==
A critic from The New Indian Express wrote that " The film may have its glitches, but for those satiated with routine formula stuff, TKPM, in just about 112 minutes, offers a different viewing experience".
