= Sahasram (film) =

- Sahasram film poster
- Directed by: Dr. Janardhanan
- Written by: Dr. Janardhanan
- Produced by: Surendran Pillai
- Starring: Suresh Gopi; Lakshmi Gopalaswamy; Bala; Madhu; Sandhya
- Cinematography: Senthil Kumar
- Edited by: Mahesh Narayanan
- Music by: M. Jayachandran
- Release date: 3 December 2010
- Country: India
- Language: Malayalam

Sahasram is a 2010 Malayalam action crime film directed by director Dr. Janardhanan, starring Suresh Gopi, Lakshmi Gopalaswamy, Bala, Madhu and Sandhya in the lead roles. Later in 2013 the film was dubbed in Tamil as Ruthravathy.

== Plot ==
The film starts with the shooting of an upcoming film featuring actor Sudheer, who is a womanizer. During the shoot, he pushes the actress Yamuna into a waterfall. But she is saved by the art director Vyshakh, who is also her lover. Vyshakh fights with Sudheer, and Yamuna commit suicide by jumping into the waterfall, when Vyshakh scolds her. This incident makes Vyshak extremely sad and he becomes a drug addict.

But later, Vyshakh gets a notice from an upcoming movie named Yakshiambalam from his friend Raghupathy, who informs him about a director seeking his help. Vyshakh agrees and visits a Mana for the location. He calls Dr. Vrinda who knows the story of this house. And then he meets the owner and his wife, Sridevi, and they agree to allow the film shoot. However, he escapes from the house after a fight erupts between the rivals.

One morning, he gets a call from the driver of Dr. Vrinda. He tells the driver that he saw the house owner and his wife, but the driver does not believe him. Vyshakh then goes to the same house only to find that the house does not exist. It is revealed that the house was haunted. He returns to the house at night and draws the picture of the same persons where he met. As he draws their pictures, the spirit of the same women appears to haunt him. but he escapes when he hears the woman's voice.

When the shooting of the movie Yakshiambalam starts at the same location as the house, they call the new debutante film actress, Supriya. Vyshakh realises that the debutante actress is a doppelgänger of the same girl. Vyshakh starts to believe that if she acts in this movie, she will surely die.

He fights with Sudheer due to past revenge. But later, at night when Sudheer came to rape Supriya. Supriya pushes him and a masked man kills Sudheer, causing Supriya to lose consciousness.

At the hospital, Supriya regain consciousness and the police files a witness report of Supriya. The police come to the shooting location to arrest Vyshakan on suspicion. But, due to the heavy influence of drugs, he gets into a violent fight with the police and the people at the location. Now, a daring and honest police officer, SP Vishnu Sahasranamam, IPS take charge of the investigation of actor Sudheer's murder case. He arrives at the location and arrests Vyshakan. Vyshakan is later admitted to the mental ward in the City Hospital.

Sudheer's Father Sreekanthan is the state home minister and seeks exact revenge on Vaishak for killing his son Sudheer. He orders the police officials that Vyshakan should be given death penalty by the court. Vyshakan turns extremely violent at the hospital and advances to attack SP Vishnu. But Vishnu defends him and Vyshakan is given a shock treatment.

Vishnu then begins his investigation into the case. He is assisted by Circle Inspector Ameer and Sub Inspector Joy. The rest of the movie is how Vishnu finds the real perpetrator behind Sudheer's death and also unravels a few mysteries behind the mansion which is being used as the shooting location.

== Cast ==
- Suresh Gopi as SP Vishnu Sahasranamam IPS, the investigating officer
- Bala as Vyshakan, art director
- Lakshmi Gopalaswamy as Dr. Vrinda, psychiatrist
- Sandhya dual role as
  - Sridevi
  - Supriya
- Madhu as Kerala Home Minister Sreekanthan, Sudheer's father
- Sarayu as Yamuna
- Jagathy Sreekumar as Production controller Raghupathy
- Suresh Krishna as Sudheer
- Riza Bava as Ananthapadmanabhan
  - Krishna as Young Ananthapadmanabhan
- Kiran Raj as CI Ameer
- Niyaz Musaliyar as SI Joy
- Rajesh Hebbar
- Sudheesh as Shajahan
- Indrans as Kochukuttan
- Kottayam Nazeer as Director Thampi
- Sidhartha Siva as Vinayan
- V K Sreeraman as ADGP Aboobacker IPS

== Soundtrack ==
Sahasram

Soundtrack album by M. Jayachandran
- Recorded: Manorama Music
- Genre: World Music
- Label: Manorama Music
- Producer: Thrilok Productions

The music of Sahasram is given by M. Jayachandran. The lyrics are written by Kaithapram Damodaran Namboothiri. The film has two songs, performed by K. S. Chitra and Alphose.

Track #	Song	Singer(s)
1	"Etho Raavil"	K. S. Chithra
2	"Kanne Vaa"	Alphonse
