= Khera =

- Jat clan
- Ethnicity: Punjabis
- Religion: Islam, Sikhism, Hinduism

Khera is a clan of Jats.

== Notable people ==
Notable people with the surname, who may or may not be affiliated with the clan, include:

- Kamal Khera (born 1989), Canadian politician
- Shiv Khera, Indian author, activist, motivational speaker and politician
- Reetika Khera, Indian economist and social activist
- Rajesh Khera (born 1968), Indian actor
- Shamoly Khera, Indian television personality

== See also ==
- Khaira (surname)
