= Dams: The Lethal Water Bombs =

2011 film by Sohan Roy

- Directed by: Sohan Roy
- Production company: Aries Telecasting Private Ltd.
- Release date: 25 June 2011 (Film Festival of Colorado)
- Running time: 21 minutes
- Country: India
- Language: English

Dams: The Lethal Water Bombs is a short documentary film about the Mullaperiyar Dam, and the possible natural disaster inherent in the structure. This 21-minute documentary was produced by Aries Telecasting Private Ltd., and directed by Sohan Roy.

== Plot ==
The Banqiao Dam in China, with its 492 million cubic meters of water, has a similar capacity to the Mullaperiyar Dam, with 443 million cubic meters. When it was destroyed by torrential rains in 1975, it claimed the lives of 250,000 people. This documentary is based on the possibility of a similar disaster happening to the Mullaperiyar Dam in India.

== Awards won ==
- Best Editing — Los Angeles Movie Awards 2011
- Best Visual Effects — Los Angeles Movie Awards 2011
- Best Documentary Short — Los Angeles Cinema Festival of Hollywood 2011

== See also ==
- Dam999
