= Kappal Muthalaali =

2009 Indian film

Kappalu Muthalali
- Directed by: Thaha
- Written by: Thaha; Saji Damodar
- Produced by: Mummy Century; Ramis Raja
- Starring: Ramesh Pisharody; Sarayu; Jagadish; Mukesh
- Cinematography: Sadath
- Edited by: P. C. Mohanan
- Music by: Sumesh Anand
- Distributed by: Screen Arts and Highness Release
- Release date: 27 November 2009
- Country: India
- Language: Malayalam

Kappalu Muthalali (transl. Ship owner) is a 2009 Indian Malayalam-language comedy drama film co-written and directed by Thaha. It stars Ramesh Pisharody and Sarayu in their debut film roles, also starring Jagadish and Mukesh.

== Plot ==
Bhoominathan keeps big aspirations in his life. His dreams are all revolving around a property in the city, which he inherited. Bhoominathan finds that making a tourist resort in the land, is the best possible business which can bring him big returns. He starts to realise his plans to build a resort by digging down for making a good basement. And he finds to his astonishment, the archaic remnants of a ship.

Bhoomi takes no time to inform the archaeological department which lands him to further trouble and his project of resort building gets blocked. Bhoomi has got a friend in Radhika, who also works with the same department. Now with the help of some fresh ideas from her, he plans to venture into a new arena of business.

== Cast ==
- Ramesh Pisharody as Bhoominathan
- Mukesh as Venkittaraman
- Sarayu as Radhika
- Jagadeesh as Thulaseedharan
- Kaviyoor Ponnamma as Devaki, Bhoominathan's mother
- Bindu Panicker
- Suraj Venjaramood as Preman
- Jagathy Sreekumar as Dubai Chaandi
- Salim Kumar as Omanakuttan
- Bheeman Raghu As Velayudhan
- Indrans as Chithragupthan
- Thilakan as Lord Yama
- Kochu Preman
- Biju Kuttan
- Narayanankutty
- Thesni Khan as Deepa
- T. P. Madhavan
- Appa Haja
- Jaffar Idukki
- Shalu Kurian
