= Khaira (surname) =

Family name

Khaira (alternatively spelt as Khara, Khehra, or Khera) is a Punjabi surname and Jat clan that is not to be confused with Kheirra, also a Jat clan, in Punjab, India and Punjab, Pakistan.

== People with the surname ==
People with surname, who may or may not be associated with the caste, include:

- Japji Khaira, Australian Panjabi actress
- Jujhar Khaira (born 1994), Canadian ice hockey player
- Nimrat Khaira (active from 2014), Indian Punjabi singer
- Sukhpal Singh Khaira (born 1965), Indian politician from Punjab
- Ravinder Singh Khaira (born 1986), Indian javelin thrower

== See also ==
- Khera
