= Rupesh Paul =

Indian film director

- Education: University of Madras
- Occupations: Director, screen writer, poet
- Children: 2
- Writing career
- Years active: 2001–present

Rupesh Paul is an Indian film director, poet, screenwriter and producer. He is known for his films Kamasutra 3D, Saint Dracula 3D and The Secret Diaries of Monalisa.

== Career ==
He directed his short film Mrigam in 2008 which was screened in Festival de Cannes Short Film Corner and You Can't Step Into the Same River Twice in the River to River Indian Film Festival. His first feature My Mother's Laptop starring National Award-winning actor Suresh Gopi was screened in International Film Festival of Kerala 2008.

He directed his first international feature Saint Dracula 3D in 2012 and Kamasutra 3D in 2014 and The Secret Diaries of Monalisa in 2018. He directed a web series titled The Great Indian Casino with Ameesha Patel in the lead. His most recent movies are The Fugitive and Alchemist with actor Sanjay Mishra in the lead. The Vanishing Act based on the disappearance of MH-370 flight is under production as of April 2022.

== Controversies ==
Rupesh Paul had to apologise on Cannes announcement of his movie The Vanishing Act based on MH-370 flight on account on hurting the sentiments of the relatives of the victims.

== Filmography ==
Year	Title	Language	Director	Writer	Notes
2008	Laptop	Malayalam	Yes	Yes	
2008	You Can't Step Twice Into the Same River	English	Yes	Yes	Short film
2010	Mrigam	Malayalam	Yes	Yes	Short film
2011	The Secret Diaries of Monalisa	English	Yes	Yes	
2012	Saint Dracula 3D	English	Yes	Yes	
2013	Pithavum Kanyakayum	Malayalam	Yes	Yes	
2014	Raktharakshassu 3D	Malayalam	Yes	Yes	Directed under the pseudonym R Factor
2015	Kamasutra 3D	English	Yes	Yes	also lyricist
2020	The Great Indian Casino	English	Yes		web series
2021	Fugitive	English	Yes		
2022	The Vanishing Act	English	Yes		also producer
2024	Alchemist	English	Yes	Yes	

== Bibliography ==
Year	Book	Language
2016	The Snakes Under the Yoga Mat	English
2017	A Child's Diary of Sins	English
2018	The Girls I Murdered by Mistake	English
2019	Abandoned Love Poems	English
2020	Seventy Love Poems	English
2021	Fuck Off	English
