= Khaira, Palghar =

Khaira Khaira Census Town
- Census Town
- Interactive map of Khaira
- Country: India
- State: Maharashtra
- District: Palghar

Languages
  - Official: Marathi
- Time zone: UTC+5:30 (IST)

Khaira is a Census Town situated in the Palghar district of Maharashtra, India.

== Demographics ==
According to the 2011 Indian Census, the total population of Khaira is 31,699 out of which 18,332 are males and 13,367 are females. The literacy rate of Khaira is 88.4 percent.
