= Yashoda Palayad =

Indian playback singer and actress

Yashoda Palayad യശോദ പാലയാട്
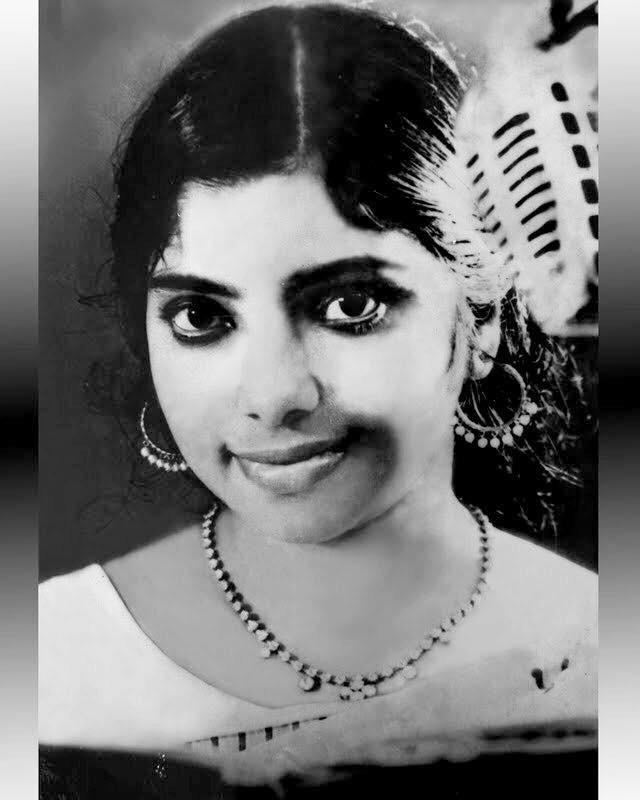

Background information
- Born: 1946; Palayad, Kannur, India
- Died: August 26, 2014 (aged 67–68)
- Occupations: Singer, actress

Yashoda Palayad (Malayalam:യശോദ പാലയാട്) was an Indian playback singer and Actor from Malayalam film industry in the 1960s and 70s.

== Personal life and career ==
Yashoda was born to late P. V. Krishnan Vaidyar and late Ammu Amma in 1946. She started her singing career through dramas at the age of ten with the song Chokachokachoka chukannoru chengodi and had also rendered mappilappattu. She was an active actress and singer in Kalanilayam and K.P.A.C. dramas.

She debuted singing with the film Palunkupathram in 1962, composed by V. Dakshinamoorthy. Later she sung for various Malayalam movies like College Girl, Mister Sundari, Gandharvam to name a few. She has sung with K. J. Yesudas, P. Jayachandran, K. P. Brahmandan and many others. She also acted in the movie Thankakkudam in 1965 along with Prem Nazir and Sheela.

She has received Kerala Sangeetha Nataka Akademi Guru Pooja Award, Mappila Kala Academy Award and Abu Dhabi Indian Social Centre Award for her contributions to the music and drama.

Yashoda was married to Illikkal Raghavan and has two daughters and a son. Playback singer Sreya Raghav is her younger daughter. She died on 26 August 2014, at the age of 68.

== See also ==
- Kerala Sangeetha Nataka Akademi
- KPAC
