= Khair (disambiguation) =

Khair is a town in Uttar Pradesh, India.

Khair may also refer to:

- Reer khair, Somali Dhulbahante subclan consisting of Jama Siad
- Abul Khair Group, conglomerate in Bangladesh
- Khair Khaneh, archeological site in Afghanistan

== See also ==
- Khaira (disambiguation)
- Kher (disambiguation)
