= Shruthy Menon =

Indian actress

- Born: Shruthi Menon; Delhi, India
- Occupations: Actor; model; television presenter; dancer
- Years active: 2004–present
- Spouse: Sahil Timbadia (m. 2017)
- Parents: Sreevalsan Unni Menon; Shashi Menon

Shruthy Menon is an Indian actress, television host, professional Master of ceremonies and model. She is currently the anchor for Sonu Nigam's concerts worldwide as well as the TV show Ugram Ujwalam.

== Personal life ==
Shruthy Menon was born to Malayali parents Sreevalsan Unni Menon & Shashi Menon in Mumbai. She got engaged to businessman Sahil Timbadia in 2017, with the couple getting married later in the year.

== Filmography ==
Year	Title	Role	Language	Notes
2004	Sancharram	Delilah	Malayalam	Malayalam Debut Film
2005	Krithyam	Julia	Malayalam	
2008	Mulla	Malli	Malayalam	
2010	Kadha Thudarunnu	Dr. Deepa	Malayalam	
2010	T. D. Dasan Std. VI B	Megha	Malayalam	
2010	Apoorvaragam	Model	Malayalam	
2010	Elektra	Lora	Malayalam	
2012	Thalsamayam Oru Penkutty	Sandhya	Malayalam	
2013	Up & Down: Mukalil Oralundu	Mitra	Malayalam	
2014	John Paul Vaathil Thurakkunnu	Dr.Suma Manoj	Malayalam	
2014	Lost & found	Rachael	English	English Debut Film
2015	Eli Eli Lama Sabachthani?		Marathi	Marathi Debut Film
2016	Kismath	Anitha	Malayalam	Won - Filmfare Critics Award for Best Actress – Malayalam; Nominated – Filmfare Award for Best Actress – Malayalam
2017	Chippy	Seema	Malayalam	
2018	Who	Arunima	English; Malayalam	Co-producer; bilingual film
2022	Kumari	Parijatham	Malayalam	
2024	Maidaan	Jazzclub singer	Hindi	Hindi Debut Film
2025	Vadakkan	Megha Nambiar	Malayalam	
2026	Spa	Jennifer	Malayalam	
2026	Uyir	Shobha	Malayalam	

== Web series ==
Year	Film	Role	Language	Note
2017	The Test Case		Hindi	web series by ALTBalaji
2021	His Storyy	Rati	Hindi	web series by ALTBalaji and Zee5
2021	Land Of Light Bulbs	Asha	English	Web series
2021	Ray	Amala Nair	Hindi	Netflix series
2023	Shehar Lakhot	Snadhya	Hindi	Amazon Prime Video

== Music video ==
Year	Film	Role	Language	Note
2016	Madhuram Malayalam	Lady	Malayalam	Music video

== Television career ==
Year	Show	Role	Channel	Language
2006–2007	Amrita Super star season 1	Host	Amrita TV	Malayalam
2007	Josco Super star season 2	Host	Amrita TV	Malayalam
2010–2013	Vodafone Comedy Stars Season 1	Host	Asianet	Malayalam
2015	Uggram Ujjwalam Season 3	Co-Host	Mazhavil Manorama	Malayalam
2015	Surya Challenge	Host	Surya TV	Malayalam
2020	Tweak India	Host	YouTube	English

== Awards and nominations ==
- Winner – Filmfare Critics Award for Best Actress – Malayalam – Kismath
- Nominated – Filmfare Award for Best Actress – Malayalam – Kismath
