= Shamoly Khera =

Indian television host and producer

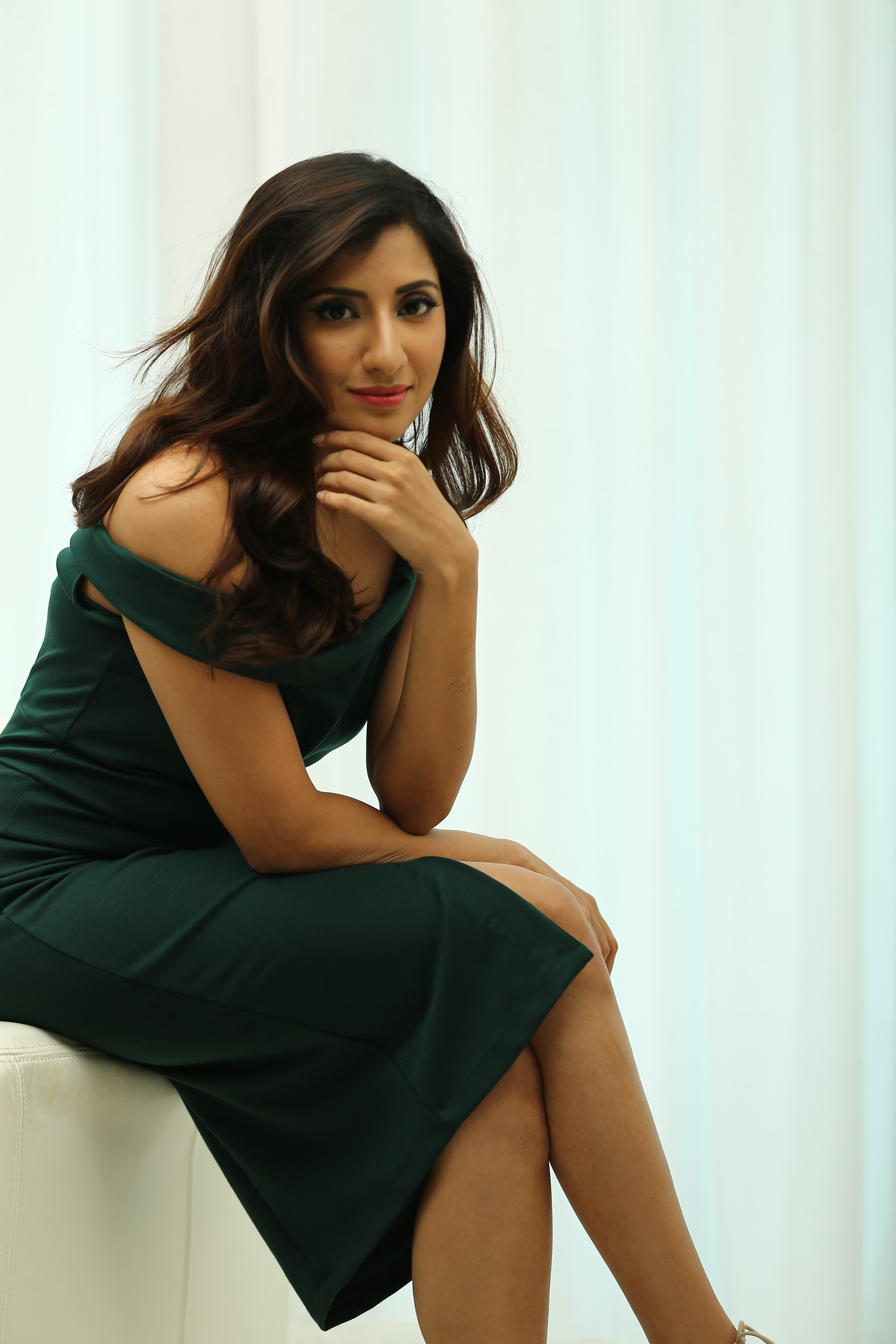
Shamoly Khera

Dr. Shamoly Khera is a public speaker.

Khera has been featured on UTV, Colors, Femina, MBC, Zee TV, IndianTelevision.com, MissMalini & Daily.

== Career ==
Khera pursued acting and performing skills at Barry John Acting School in 2009. She acted in various theatre productions (for plays like Asylum, at Thespo 11 and Utter Cupidity) and later on several short films with Whistling Woods International till March 2011. She performed successful weekend shows of Utter Cupidity in July 2012 at The Comedy Store, as the opening act for The Vir Das Show. She joined UTV STARS during its inception and helped conceptualise, script and host episodes. Shows like Style Addict and Live My Life were acclaimed for their content and format.

Khera co-founded the production house One Take Media, with offices in Mumbai and Dubai. She manages international distribution and acquisition from the Dubai base. While in Dubai she hosted two seasons of Zee Connect airing on Zee TV Middle East.

She has hosted and produced a cooking show called The Great Indian Global Kitchen which aired on TLC India, Rishtey US, Rishtey UK, MBC Bollywood and British Airways.

Dr. Shamoly Khera is a television presenter and interviewer who has interviewed personalities from the Indian entertainment industry, including Amitabh Bachchan, Shah Rukh Khan, Priyanka Chopra, Deepika Padukone and Ranveer Singh, as well as public figures and business leaders such as Shashi Tharoor and Azad Moopen. Her work includes hosting television programmes covering lifestyle, Bollywood and cooking, as well as presenting international events. She has also been involved in developing scripts and preparing interviews.

MEDIA	EVENTS	YEAR
Zee International	Embracing Taiwan	2018
IGTV Show	Stay Home Stay Tough	2020

During the lockdown in 2020, Shamoly hosted her talk show called ‘Stay Home Stay Inspired.’ Some of the popular names on this show were Manav Kaul, Amit Gaur, Rajat Barmecha, Nitinn Miranni, Pankaj Mishra, Dr. Anjali Mukerjee, Malini Agarwal amongst others. The show received immense credibility to spread awareness & inspiration at times of crisis.

== Shows ==
CHANNEL	TV SHOW	YEAR
UTV STARS	Live My Life - SEASON 1	2011
UTV STARS	Style Addict	2011–2013
UTV STARS	Superstar Santa	2012
UTV STARS	Lux The Cbosen One	2012
UTV STARS	Live my Life SEASON 2	2012–2013
ZEE TV	World of Food	2013
ZEE TV Middle East	Zee Connect Season 4	2014
ZEE TV Middle East	Zee Connect Season 5	2015
Rishtey U.K.	The Great Indian Global Kitchen	2017

Events As Host	YEAR
People's Magazine Best Dressed Awards	2011
Ficci Flo Women Achiever's Awards	2012
Cosmopolitan Fun Fearless Female Awards	2012
Kelvinator Women's Achievers Awards	2012
UTV Stars Walk Of The Stars Launch	2012
Aambey Valley India Bridal Fashion Week	2013
Asia Business Leaders Awards	2014
Forbes Middle East Award	2015
Femina Middle East Awards	2016
Filmfare Middle East Awards	2017
Speakin Leadership Conclave Awards	2019

== Writer ==
As Writer / Editor	Year	Web / TV
The Indian Ad Reviewer	2012–present	http://indian-ad-reviewer.blogspot.in
The Big M Music Magazine	2010-2013	www.thebigm.co.in
Style Addict	2011-2013	110 episodes / UTV Stars Network

== International hosting Representing India in Taiwan ==
In 2019, Dr. Khera got an opportunity to represent India in Taiwan, via the show embracing Taiwan, produced by Zee International, where she got the opportunity to interview and interact with leading Taiwanese ministers & entrepreneurs like Joseph Wu, Minister of Foreign Affairs, Tseng Hou-jen, Diplomat and Theodore Huang amongst others.

== AUTHOR ==
Dr. Shamoly Khera's debut book Bedazzle –The Art & Science of Confidence was published by Bloomsbury India in December 2020 and has been trending in the bestseller self-help genre. The book focuses on building inner confidence; it offers practical insights and tips on speaking with confidence that can help anyone shine in their respective fields with charisma and ease. The book received a global launch in US, UK, India, Singapore and is available on Amazon worldwide.

== Keynote Speaker ==
Dr. Shamoly Khera is a Keynote Speaker at various conferences and expert meets. Her TED Talk was telecasted worldwide in October 2020. The talk focussed one living on the extraordinary life and the 5 essential things that can make it work.
