= Who (2018 film) =

- Theatrical Release Poster.
- Directed by: Ajay Devaloka
- Screenplay by: Ajay Devaloka
- Story by: Ajay Devaloka
- Produced by: Vishakha Bokil
- Starring: Shine Tom Chacko; Shruthy Menon; Merin Mariya; Pearle Maaney; Rajeev Pillai
- Cinematography: Amith Surendran
- Edited by: Ajay Devaloka
- Music by: Catharsis and Manikandan Ayyapa
- Production company: Corridor 6 Films
- Distributed by: Corridor 6 Films
- Release date: 26 October 2018
- Country: India
- Languages: Malayalam; English

Who is a 2018 Indian English and Malayalam-language science fiction mystery film, written and directed by Ajay Devaloka as his directorial debut. The film features Shine Tom Chacko, Shruthy Menon, Pearle Maaney, Rajeev Pillai and Prashanth Nair (IAS) . The film was produced by Vishakha Bokil and co-produced by MF Anto under the banner of Corridor 6 Films. The teaser was released on YouTube in September.Who is the first time travel movie from Kerala. The movie had its official world premiere at the 71st Cannes film festival's market section on 15 May 2018. Who had a nationwide release in India in Malayalam language with English subtitles obtaining rave reviews from the critics. 'WHO' is now streaming on Amazon Prime worldwide.

== Synopsis ==
A beautiful yet mysterious valley spread across 200 km. In Mercada, strange things happen every year on Christmas Day. A young girl, a dream interpreter, a criminal psychologist and a team of two police officers try to solve the puzzles in the valley.

The film deals with dream interpretation with an emphasis on magic realism. Time travel is another significant aspect of the movie which serves as a sequel to the yet to be released movie, Isabella. Set for a niche audience, the film is an Indie movie. Hollywood vocalist Uyanga Bold has sung a song for WHO.

== Cast ==
- Shine Tom Chacko as John Luka
- Shruthy Menon as Arunima Avarthan
- Pearle Maaney as Dolores
- Rajeev Pillai as Hector
- Prashanth Nair IAS as Dr. Samuel
- Angana Roy as Neena
- Sajin Saleem as Veetus Benty
- Merin Mariya as Ayana Bennet

== Production ==
=== Filming ===
Who began shooting June 2017 in Nainital, Uttarakhand, and took 20 days. Principal photography for the Who began in 2017 May at Munnar. Crew planned two months break from filming as Shine Tom Chacko had prior commitments. On 23 July Ajay Devaloka started the filming in Naintal with Natural lighting. Devaloka was adamant that he wanted virgin geography which no cinema viewer had ever seen. So they were lucky and got the apt place in Uttarakhand. The film depends mostly on mist, so it was challenging to keep the continuity as well. Locations of many scenes were in remote places far away from each other, which made the crew uneasy. Ultimately the second schedule wrapped up after 23 days shoot for Pearle Maaney to reduce her weight. The movie was completed in 3 schedules.

The film was officially announced as Isabella and the title launch was done by director Mohan, who interestingly had a film Isabella as director in 1988.

== Release ==
The movie had its official world premiere at the 71st Cannes film festival's market section on 15 May 2018. The film had its theatrical release on 10 October 2018 in India.

== Reception ==
=== Critical response ===
Nirmal Narayanan of IB Times wrote WHO is not everyone's cup of tea. But if you are the one who likes to enjoy films like 'Triangle' and 'Inception', book the tickets for this Ajay Devaloka directorial without any second thoughts.

== Music ==
Who is a Dolby Atmos motion picture. The Sound design is done by Vishakha Bokil and National award winner Sinoy Joseph is the mixing engineer in the film. The film was fully shot in Sync-Sound. Úyanga Bold who served as a vocalist for Hans Zimmer in the score of The Dark Knight lent her vocals for a song in the film.
