= Oru Paathiraa Swapnam Pole =

Oru Paathiraa Swapanam Pole
- Directed by: Sharan Venugopal
- Written by: Sharan Venugopal
- Based on: Vaibhavam by Susmesh Chandroth
- Produced by: Satyajit Ray Film and Television Institute
- Starring: Nadiya Moidu; Garggi Ananthan
- Cinematography: Koustabh Mukherjee
- Edited by: Jyoti Swaroop Panda
- Music by: Basil CJ
- Release date: 17 January 2021
- Running time: 37 minutes
- Country: India
- Language: Malayalam

Oru Paathiraa Swapnam Pole (transl. Like a Midnight Dream) is a 2021 Malayalam language short film written and directed by Sharan Venugopal. The film stars Nadiya Moidu and Garggi Ananthan in lead roles and is produced by Satyajit Ray Film and Television Institute. The film was premiered at the 51st International Film Festival of India under the Indian Panorama section. The film won the Best Film on Family Values at the 67th National Film Awards.

== Plot ==
Sudha, an entrepreneur and a mother of a college girl, finds her world upside down when a doctor suspects that she has cancer. Her worries deepens even further when one day she goes through her daughter's laptop and chances upon a video that can change their dynamic forever.

== Cast ==
- Nadiya Moidu as Sudha
- Garggi Ananthan as Theertha
- Devaki Bhaagi as Dr. Rekha
- Sudhi Panoor as Wahab
- Saheer Muhammed as Mathew

== Production ==
The screenplay was written in 2018 by Sharan Venugopal based on a short story titled 'Vaibhavam' written by Susmesh Chandroth. The film was shot in January 2019 in and around Fort Kochi. The post production of the film was completed in Kolkata and Mumbai by July 2019.
