= Kheda, Jhabua =

Kheda खेड़ा
- Location in Madhya Pradesh, India
- Coordinates: 22.861°N 74.706°E
- Country: India
- State: Madhya Pradesh
- District: Jhabua district

Population (2011)
  - Total: 4,518

Language
  - Official: Hindi
- Time zone: UTC+5:30 (IST)

Kheda is a village in Madhya Pradesh state of India.
