= Dam 999 =

- Theatrical release poster
- Directed by: Sohan Roy
- Written by: Rob Tobin; Sohan Roy
- Produced by: BizTV Network
- Starring: Vinay Rai; Joshua Fredric Smith; Vimala Raman; Linda Arsenio; Rajit Kapur; Ashish Vidyarthi
- Cinematography: Ajayan Vincent
- Edited by: Suresh Pai
- Music by: Ouseppachan
- Production company: BizTV Network
- Distributed by: Warner Bros. Pictures
- Release date: 25 November 2011
- Running time: 108 minutes
- Countries: India; United Arab Emirates
- Language: English

Dam 999 is a 2011 English-language 3-D science fiction disaster film. A co-production between the United Arab Emirates (UAE) and India, it was produced by BizTV Network, UAE and directed by Sohan Roy. The film is based on the award-winning short documentary DAMs - The Lethal Water Bombs, and the Banqiao dam disaster of 1975 that claimed the lives of 250,000 people in China and anticipated calamity for outdated dams in the world.

Apart from being a controversial movie in India with respect to its theme, the screenplay of the movie was added to the permanent core collection in Library of the Academy of Motion Picture Arts and Sciences before its release in 2011.

== Plot ==
The story encompasses around nine characters portraying nine variants of emotion (Navarasa) and an outdated dam.

The story starts with Vinay (Vinay Rai), who is a mariner and works in ships. One day he visits his native place, somewhere in Kerala, with his son Sam (Jineeth Rath) to meet his father Shankaran (Rajit Kapur). Shankaran is a village doctor or 'Vaidyan' and is also a master in astrology and the ancient sciences. Sam is a diabetic and Vinay wanted to have him treated by his grandfather. Another storyline is that of the orphan Meera (Vimala Raman), who has been staying with Shankaran since her childhood, treated as his own daughter and who helps him treat various patients. Vinay and Meera share a special bond and love each other. When Shankaran studies their horoscopes, he learns that whenever they would express their love towards each other, something terrible would happen. Learning this Meera sacrifices her love, and thus Vinay marries Sandra (Linda Arsenio) who is a TV journalist. Now after a long time when Vinay returns home with his son, his special bond with Meera develops again with Meera reciprocating the feeling as well. On a parallel track, a corrupt Mayor - Durai (Ashish Vidyarthi)- is fighting an issue of an old dam in his area. Towards the end a leak is discovered inside the dam, and when a heavy storm and rains hit on the same day, a high alert is declared.

== Cast ==
- Vinay Rai as Vinay Shankaran
- Joshua Fredric Smith as Captain Fredrick Brown
- Linda Arsenio as Sandra, a TV journalist and Vinay's wife
- Vimala Raman as Meera, Vinay's love interest
  - Parvathy Renjith as younger Meera
- Megha Burman as Raziya, a Pakistani Girl and Freddy's wife
- Rajit Kapur as Shankaran, Vinay's father
- Jineeth Rath as Sam, Vinay's son
- Ashish Vidyarthi as Durai, the antagonist
- Jaala Pickering as Freddy's invalid sister
- Urmila Unni as Vinay's mother
- S. P. Sreekumar
- Bineesh Bastin

== Production ==
=== Development ===
The movie is tributed to the 250,000 people who lost their lives in the 1975 Banqiao Dam disaster in China. As per producer-director Sohan, "The central character of the story is this dam and the life of a few mariners living near it. There are nine characters in the movie, representing the Navarasa. I believe that every individual is born with a sthayi bhava, but when his suppressed feelings burst, like a dam, it changes."

=== Casting ===
The cast includes acclaimed Indian actor Ashish Vidyarthi. Veteran Malayalam actor Thilakan was originally cast to do an important role in the film, but was later removed. Eventually, Rajit Kapur was cast instead of Thilakan. There were reports that Association of Malayalam Movie Artists (AMMA) also had intervened in Thilakan's replacement. In a related development, Thilakan and his supporters had a march towards the shooting location of the film at Alappuzha.

=== Filming ===
Dam999 started its shooting at Alleppey, Kerala. A number of unexpected hurdles were faced by the crew while shooting the movie. Veteran Malayalam actor Thilakan, who was supposed to be a part of Dam 999, was made to drop out of the project due to his battle with AMMA. However the problem was solved by replacing Thilakan with Bollywood Actor Rajit Kapoor. Thilakan was paid seven lakhs as compensation. While the prior issue was still simmering, another lead character from India walked out due to disputes with the crew, while the shoot was in progress, bringing the movie to a halt. The star cast of the movie was immediately altered and the initial sequences in Kerala was completed as planned. From various locations such as Ooty in India, the shoot of the movie progressed to Fujairah, UAE, where Dam 999 has captured a couple of its sequences on an oil tanker. The climax of the movie was compiled in Ramoji film city in Hyderabad, built by the Art Director Padmashree Thotta Tharani. While in the stage of post production the movie grabbed the attention owing to its story and title. Debates regarding the ever existing fear of outdated dams have started. The visual effects were done by EyeQube Studios.

== Novel ==
DAM999 – The Novel is published by Indra Publishing House and was made available in the market before the release of the movie. Unexpected huge demands rose for the novel. This novel is penned by director Sohan Roy & co-written by Naufal Ashraf.

== Controversies ==
The Dravida Munnetra Kazhagam (DMK) complained that the film is based on the Mullaperiyar Dam dispute between Tamil Nadu and Kerala. The DMK party chief M. Karunanidhi urged the Tamil Nadu chief minister J. Jayalalithaa to ban the movie considering "people's safety". A day before its scheduled release on 25 November, the film was banned by the State Government of Tamil Nadu on the grounds that the release would disturb the cordial relations between Tamil Nadu and Kerala.

Challenging the Tamil Nadu government's ban on screening of his film Dam 999 in the State, Producer-director Sohan Roy, on 30 November 2011, moved to the Supreme Court with writ petition, questioning the subjective satisfaction of the Chief Minister (on whose directions the impugned 24 November order was passed), arrived on "narrow political objectives." He said the order had no constitutional, much less legal, basis.

He said the State suspended the screening of the Hollywood movie without hearing him or affording him an opportunity for clarification. The "arbitrary, unilateral and unjustified act" violated his fundamental right to freedom guaranteed under Article 19(1) (a). Explaining the contents of the film, he said it "spreads the message about the consequences of dam disasters around the world."

In response to this on 8 December 2011, the Supreme Court asked the Tamil Nadu government to hear the objections of Sohan Roy on 12 December and pass appropriate orders by 16 December.

The Supreme Court on 24 January 2013 dismissed filmmaker Sohan Roy's petition challenging a further extension of the ban by the Tamil Nadu government on screening of this film in the State. It further added, "the people are expecting this issue [of the Mullaperiyar dam] will be resolved. At this stage, why should we aggravate the situation not only in Tamil Nadu but also in Kerala? We can’t close our eyes to the objections and decide the case purely on legal aspects. We have to respect the sentiments of the people".

== Recognitions ==
Three of the soundtracks "Dakkanaga Dugu", "DAM999 Theme song" and "Mujhe Chodke" were in nomination list for 84th Academy Awards. The music was composed by Ouseppachan and the lyrics were penned by Sohan Roy. DAM999 was submitted in race for Best Picture apart from being eligible for best Original score also for 84th Academy Awards. The movie was sent to the Oscar awards by All Lights Film Services (ALFS) .

DAM999 was titled as the very first Indian movie to be selected for Golden Rooster Awards 2012, the national film award event conducted in mainland China. The movie was officially suggested by renowned Israelian director Dan Wolman.Dam999 is selected to compete under 12 categories in Golden Rooster Awards which took place in Shaoxing City towards the end of September 2012.

DAM999 won Best Director and Best Feature Film award at the Cinerockom International Film Festival, Best International Feature Film, Special Jury Award, Best Movie of the Festival at International Film Festival for Environment, Health, and Culture 2013. It was declared Best English Film at Sangli Film Festival and adjudged as ‘Judges Favorite’ at International Film Festival – Antigua Barbuda.

DAM999 was selected for screening various film festivals such as Tehran Film Festival, Jaipur International Film Festival, Kuala Lumpur Eco Film Festival, Malaysia, Chain NYC Film Festival, USA, Louisville's International Festival of Film, USA and Trinity International Film Festival, USA, Laughlin International Film Festival, USA and 10th Annual Salento Film Festival, Italy.

== Soundtrack ==
The soundtracks for DAM999 was penned by Sohan Roy and composed by Ouseppachan. The movie totally comprised 9 multilingual soundtracks out of which 5 are in English, 2 are in Hindi, 2 are in Malayalam. The music of DAM999 was officially released at a grand event presided by A. R. Rahman where Ouesphachan, the music director of the movie handed the first copy to the maestro. Apart from the launch at Chennai, DAM999 music was also launched at multiple other locations including Middle East and Southern Part of India.

Three of the soundtracks "Dakkanaga Dugu", "DAM999 Theme song" and "Mujhe Chodke" were categorized eligible & selected for 84th Academy Awards among other 97 songs.

No.	Title	Singer(s)	Length
1.	"Mujhe Chodke"	Hariharan, Shreya Ghoshal	5:46
2.	"Dam999 Theme Song"	Suchith Suresan, Suvi Suresh, Ouseppachan	4:49
3.	"Dakkanaga"	Shakti Shree, Suchith Suresan, Ouseppachan	4:53
4.	"Thottaduthu Nee"	P. Jayachandran, K. S. Chithra	4:39
5.	"Omanathingal"	K. S. Chithra	2:32
6.	"Everyday"	Shakti Shree, Ouseppachan	4:26
7.	"O My Queen"	Franco	4:12
8.	"I walk away"	Nivedya, Nirmalya	4:21
9.	"Baat Hai Kya"	Niran Kootingal	5:16

== Reception ==
Dam 999 released nationwide in 550 theaters of India and also in the Middle east. The film opened to generally mixed to negative reviews.

== See also ==
- Mullaperiyar Dam
- Tamil Nadu-Kerala dam row
