= Kher (surname) =

Kashmiri Pandit surname

Khar often misspelt kher is a Kashmiri Pandit and Karhade Brahmin clan or surname, native to the Kashmir Valley in Jammu and Kashmir and Maharashtra, India.

== Usage ==
Kher/Khar as a last name is used by Kashmiri Brahmins and Karhade Brahmins.

Multiple Kashmiri surnames have been attached to a Kashmiri person because of the appearance of any of their ancestors in past with any animal or a bird, which later became the family's surname.

== Notable people ==
- B. G. Kher (1888–1957), politician
- Govind Ballal Kher (1710–1760), Military of Peshwas in Bundelkhand
- Anupam Kher, actor
- Saiyami Kher, actor
