= Khedda (film) =

- Directed by: Manoj Kana
- Produced by: K V Abdul Nazar
- Starring: Sudev Nair; Asha Sharath; Uthara Sharath; Sudheer Karamana; Jolly Chirayath; Sarayu Mohan
- Cinematography: Pratap P. Nair
- Music by: Bijibal, Sreevalsan J Menon
- Production company: Benzy Productions
- Release date: 2022
- Language: Malayalam
- Box office: est. ₹1.8 crore

Khedda is a 2022 Malayalam movie directed by Manoj Kana which got released in theaters on 2 December 2022, starring Sudev Nair, Asha Sharath, Uthara Sharath, Sudheer Karamana, Jolly Chirayath and Sarayu Mohan etc.

== Cast ==
- Sudev Nair
- Asha Sharath
- Uthara Sharath
- Sudheer Karamana
- Jolly Chirayath
- Sarayu Mohan

== Reception ==
According to Mathrubhumi – Khedda is a movie which throw light to the question that how much safer are we using our smartphones?

According to Malayala Manorama – Khedda is a movie with a strong screenplay and the movie is talking about a relevant subject which the public must discuss.

According to Asianet News - Khedda is a movie which talks about the life of people who gets into new generation traps
