= Dialogue editor =

The dialogue editor is a type of sound editor who assembles, synchronizes, and edits all the dialogue in a film or television production. Usually, they will use the production tracks: the sound that was recorded on the set. If any of the production tracks are unusable they can be replaced by either alternate production tracks recorded on set or by ADR, automated dialogue replacement, which is recorded after the shoot with the actors watching their performances in a sound studio and rerecording the lines. Large productions may have an ADR editor working under the dialogue editor, but the positions are often combined. The ADR editor or dialogue editor also work with the walla group in films which they are required, providing the background chatter noise in scenes with large crowds, such as parties or restaurants.

Once the dialogue editor has completed the dialogue track, the re-recording mixer then mixes it with the music and sound effects tracks to produce the final soundtrack.
