= Indu Menon =

Indian writer

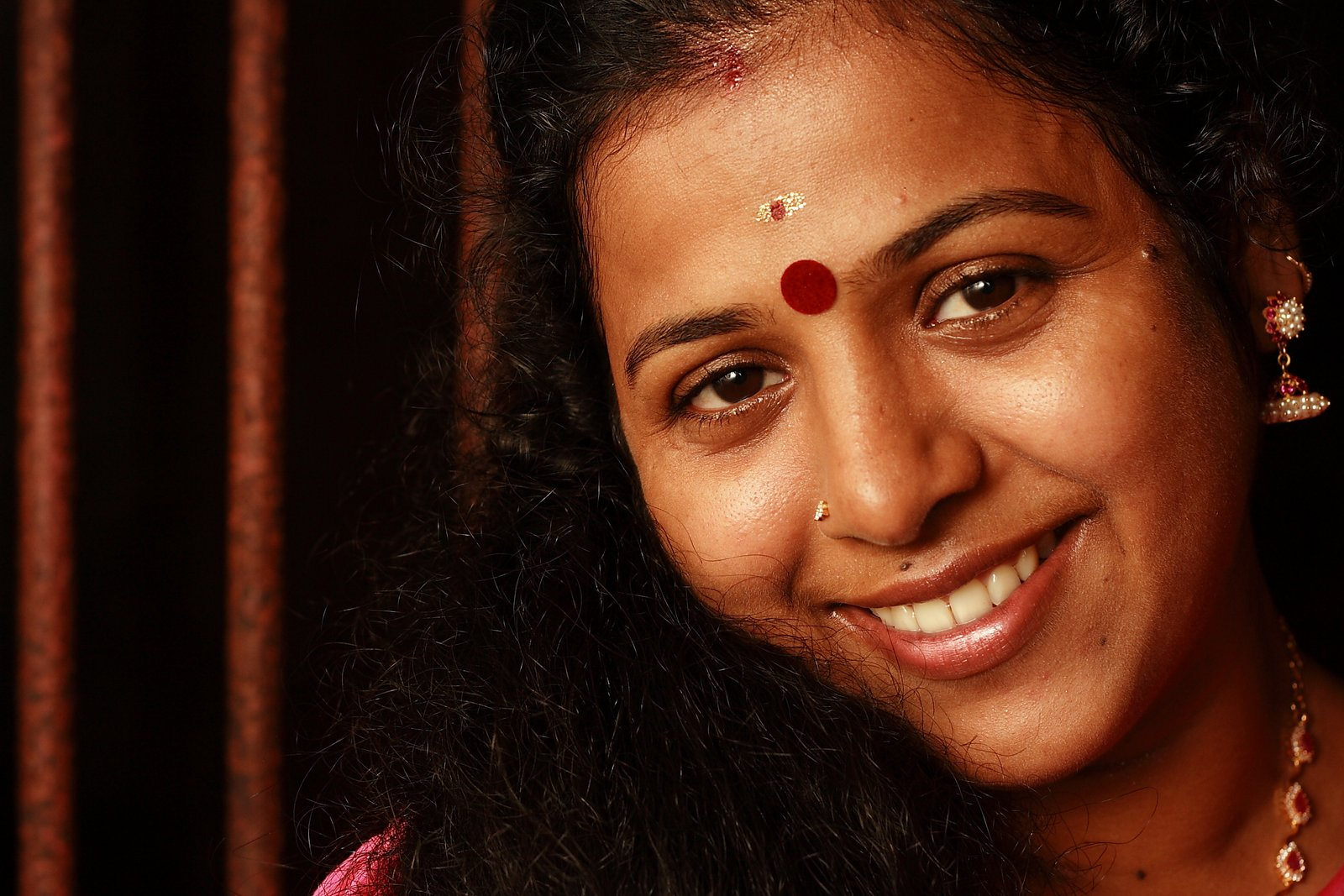

Indu Menon is an Indian novelist and short story writer.

== Academic career ==
Menon is a lecturer in Sociology and Anthropology at the Kerala Institute for Research Training and Development Studies (KIRTADS).

== Bibliography ==
=== Novels ===
- Kappalinekkurichoru Vichithrapusthakam (2015)
- Janafress Oru Kodiya Kamukan (2021)

=== Collections of short stories ===
- The Lesbian Cow (2002)
- Sangh parivar (2005)
- Hinduchayayulla Muslim Purushan (2007)
- Chumbanasabda thaaravali (2013)
- Indumenonte Kathakal (2013)
- Pazharasaththottam (2017)
- Lesbian Cow and Other Stories (2021) in English by Eka Westland. Translated by K. Nadakumar
- Indu Menonnte Thiranjedutha Kathakal (2020)
- Fruit Garden

=== Memoirs/ Poems ===
- Enne Chumbikkan Padippicha sthreeye (2014)
- Ente thene ente aanandame (Love Poems) (2014)
- Ente kadha Ente Pennungaludeyum (2021)
- Nhanoru Pavam Gidharalle Enthinaanu Neeyenne kadara Kondu Meettunnath (2022)
- Ente Kavithakal (2021)

=== Translations ===
- The Lesbian Cow (2002)
- Avar Chaayam thekkaatha Chavittu Padikalilirunnu Cholam Thinnumpol (2003)
- Anuragaththinte Pusthakam (2007)
- Nammute Raktham (2021) (Tribal Poetry)
- Janafress (Arabic) (2020)

=== Edited work ===
- Bhoomiyile Penkuttikalkk (2005)
- Thanath Bhakshanavum Jeevanopadhiyum (2019)
- Unwritten Histories and Tribal Freedom Fighters (2020)
- Kadalu Thai Poomaram Book of Tribal Songs (2019)
- Vlusam; Bridge Book in Muthuva- Malayalam Language (2019)
