= Khed, Rajasthan =

Khed
- village
- Kher (खेड़)
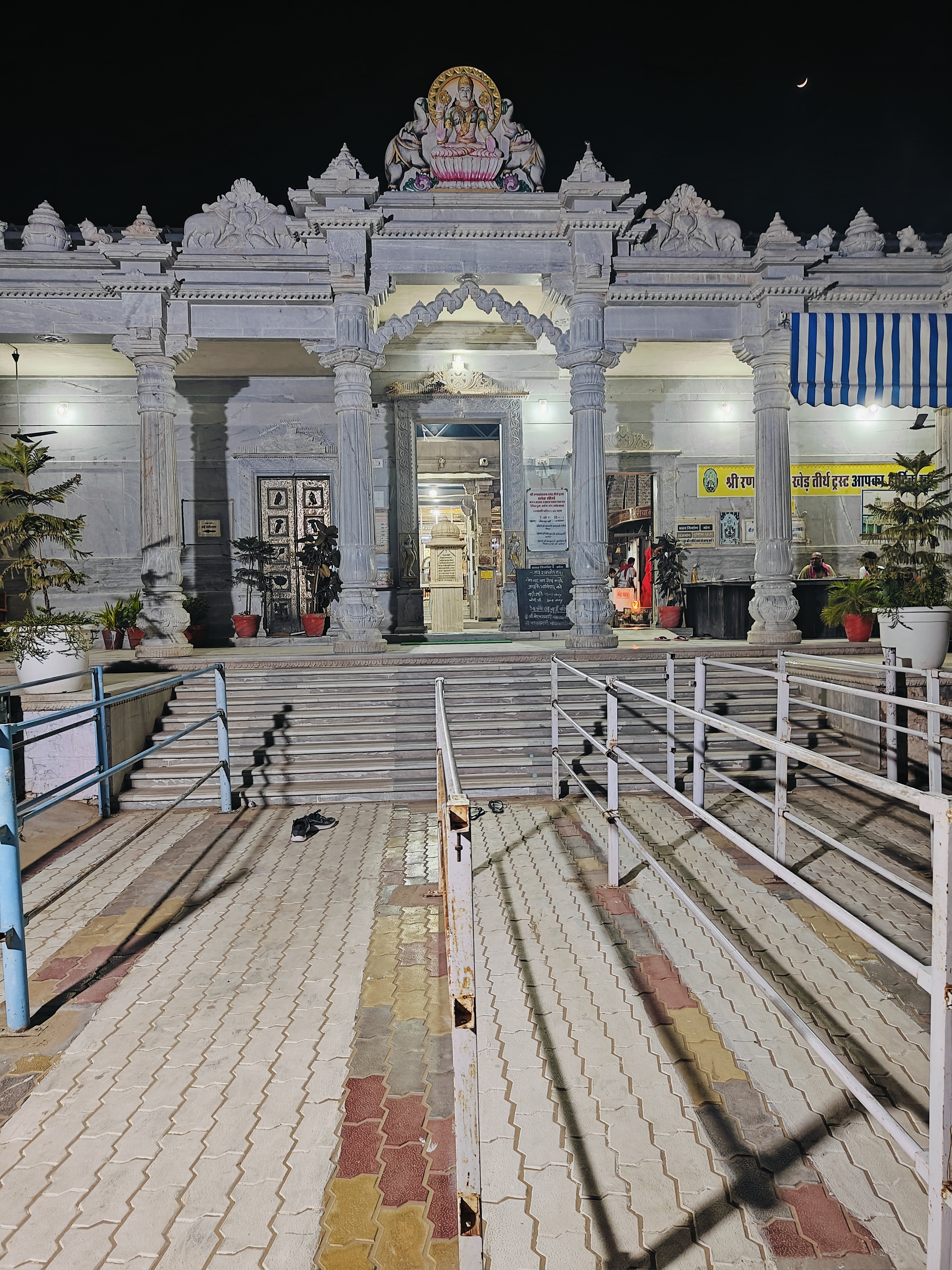
- Khed Temple Balotra

- Location in Rajasthan, India Khed (India)
- Coordinates: 25°51′47″N 72°10′20″E
- Country: India
- State: Rajasthan
- District: Balotra

Area
  - Total: 3,101 ha (7,660 acres)

Population (2011)
  - Total: 1,163
- Time zone: UTC+5:30 (IST)
- PIN: 344022
- ISO 3166 code: RJ-IN

Khed/Kher is a village in Balotra District, of Rajasthan, India. It is 9 km from Balotra and situated on Baytu-Balotra Road. Kher has a total population of 1,163 peoples according to Census 2011.

== See also ==
•Khed Temple
