= Sohan Roy =

Indian entrepreneur based at Sharjah

Dr. Sohan Roy
- Born: Punalur, Kerala, India
- Occupations: Entrepreneur; Film director; Film producer
- Known for: Aries Group of Companies
- Spouse: Abhini Sohan
- Children: 2
- Website: https://www.sohanroy.com/

Sohan Roy is an Indian entrepreneur and film director and producer based at Sharjah. He is the founder, chairman, and CEO of Aries Group of Companies, and a Naval Architect.

== Early life and career ==
Sohan Roy had his BTech in Naval Architecture and Ship Building at Department of Ship Technology CUSAT. He started his career as a naval architect, and later worked as a marine surveyor at several companies. He started Aries Marine & Engineering Services in 1998, headquartered in Sharjah, UAE.

Roy directed the film DAM999 whose screenplay was added to the permanent core collection in the library of the Academy of Motion Picture Arts and Sciences. His Aries group has taken over actor Mohanlal's Vismayas Max studio complex, Kerala's first DTS studio, situated at Thiruvananthapuram. He worked as Project Designer of World’s second CSR movie – Aickarakkonathe Bhishaguaranmaar.

He is the founder-director of Concept Indywood, Founder President of Indywood Billionaires Club.

Roy is also a poet and author, he has been writing four line short poetry, known as 'Anukavyam' every day for the past two years.

== Awards and accomplishments ==
Forbes listed Roy among top Indian leaders of the Arab world four times in a row since 2015 to 2019.

He was honored with the Honorary Professional Doctorate Certificate in Global Leadership and Management by European International University (EIU), Paris.

He was awarded with Knighthood of Parte Guelfa, thus becoming first Indian to be awarded with this award.

== Filmography ==
Year	Film	Language	Role	Notes	Ref
2011	Dams: The Lethal Water Bombs	English	Director, producer	Documentary	
2011	DAM999	English	Director, producer		
2012	Saint Dracula	English	Producer		
2017	Jalam	Malayalam	Producer		
2018	Aickarakkonathe Bhishaguaranmaar (Physicians of Aickarakkonam)	Malayalam	Project design & lyrics		
2019	Kaanal Neer	Tamil	Producer		
2020	Al Mallu	Malayalam	Actor		
2021	Black Sand	English	Director		
