= N. Harikumar =

Indian audio engineer

- Born: 19 July 1955 (age 71); Kollam, Kerala, India
- Education: Adyar Film Institute
- Occupations: Sound designer Mixing engineer
- Years active: 1979–present
- Notable work: Manju, Anantaram, Mathilukal, Mazha
- Spouse: Shalini Harikumar

Narayanan Nair Harikumar (born 19 July 1955) is a sound editor, designer and mixing engineer, known for his works in Malayalam films. He has won two National Film Awards and nine Kerala State Film Awards for audiography. He has worked for many Adoor Gopalakrishnan movies like Anantaram, Mathilukal, Nizhalkuthu, Naalu Pennungal, Oru Pennum Randaanum etc. He worked as Chief Sound Engineer and Studio Manager at Kerala State Film Development Corporation's Chithranjali Studio and later as the Chief Audio Engineer at Aries Vismayas Max.

== Early life ==
N. Harikumar was born on 19 July 1955 in Kollam. He completed his schooling from Kollam Govt. Model Boys High School, Thumba St.Xaviers College and Diploma in Sound Engineering from M.G.R. Government Film and Television Training Institute. He started his career as a sound recordist at Delhi Doordarshan Kendra. In 1979, he joined Chitranjali Studio as sound recordist under renowned sound engineer P. Devadas.

== Awards ==
National Film Awards

- 1987 - Anantaram (shared with P. Devadas and T. Krishnanunni)
- 1989 - Mathilukal

Kerala State Film Awards

- 2000 - Mazha
- 2002 - Nizhalkuthu
- 2003 - Margam
- 2004 - Perumazhakkalam
- 2006 - Drishtantham
- 2008 - Oru Pennum Randaanum (shared with T. Krishnanunni)
- 2009 - Patham Nilayile Theevandi
- 2013 - Kanyaka Talkies (Sound mixing)

Kerala Film Critics Association Awards

- 1997 - Kaliyattam (shared with T. Krishnanunni)
- 2002 - Bhavam (shared with T. Krishnanunni)
- 2004 - Perumazhakkalam, Kaazhcha, Oridam
- 2008 - Pakal Nakshatrangal
- 2010 - Makaramanju, Karmayogi
- 2014 - Mizhi Thurakku
- 2018 - Oru Kuprasidha Payyan

Other awards

- 2011 - John Abraham National Award Special Mention for Sound mixing
- Asianet Award, Mathrubhumi Medimix Award, Amritha Film Fraternity Award, Kerala State TV Award for Best Audiography, Kerala State TV award for Best Sound Editor.
