= 52nd Kerala State Film Awards =

Kerala State Film Awards

- Awarded for: Honouring achievements in Malayalam films
- Date: 27 May 2022
- Location: Thiruvananthapuram
- Country: India
- Presented by: Kerala State Chalachitra Academy
- First award: 1969

Highlights
- Most wins: Joji (4); Minnal Murali (4)
- Website: keralafilm.com

The 52nd Kerala State Film Awards, presented by the Kerala State Chalachitra Academy were announced by the Minister for Cultural Affairs, Saji Cherian in Thiruvananthapuram on 27 May 2022.

== Writing category ==
=== Jury ===
• (chairman)
•
• (member and secretary)

=== Awards ===
Each award recipient was given a cash prize, certificate and statuette.

Name of award	Title of work	Awardee(s)	Cash prize
Best Book on Cinema	Chamayam	Pattanam Rasheed	₹30,000
Best Article on Cinema	Malayala Cinemayile Aanoruthanmar	Jithin K. C.	₹20,000

=== Jury Mention ===
Each award recipient was given a certificate and statuette.

Name of award	Title	Awardee(s)
Book on Cinema	Nashta Swapnangal	R. Gopalakrishnan
Book on Cinema	Focus: Cinema Padanangal	Sheeba M. Kurien
Article on Cinema	Georgekuttiyum Malayaliyude Ubhayabhavanayum	Rakesh Cherukodu

== Film category ==
=== Jury ===
• Saeed Akhtar Mirza (chairman)
• Sundar Das	• Bombay Jayashri
• Suresh Triveni	• Dwarak Warrier
• Fowzia Fathima	• K. Gopinathan
• C. Ajoy (member secretary)

=== Awards ===
All award recipients receive a cash prize, certificate and statuette.

Name of award	Title of film	Awardee(s)	Cash prize
Best Film	Aavasavyuham	Director: Krishand R. K.	₹100,000
Best Film	Aavasavyuham	Producer: Krishand R. K.	₹200,000
Second Best Film	Nishiddho	Director: Tara Ramanujan	₹150,000
Second Best Film	Nishiddho	Producer: Kerala State Film Development Corporation	₹150,000
Second Best Film	Chavittu	Director: Sajas Rahman; Shinos Rahman	₹150,000
Second Best Film	Chavittu	Producer: Sharaf U Dheen	₹150,000
Best Director	Joji	Dileesh Pothan	₹200,000
Best Actor	Aarkkariyam	Biju Menon	₹100,000
Best Actor	Nayattu; Madhuram; Thuramukham; Freedom Fight	Joju George	₹100,000
Best Actress	Bhoothakaalam	Revathy	₹100,000
Best Character Actor	Kala	Sumesh Moor	₹50,000
Best Character Actress	Joji	Unnimaya Prasad	₹50,000
Best Child Artist	Niraye Thathakalulla Maram	Adithyan (Male category)	₹50,000
Best Child Artist	Thala	Sneha Anu (Female category)	₹50,000
Best Story	Naayattu	Shahi Kabir	₹50,000
Best Cinematography	Churuli	Madhu Neelakandan	₹50,000
Best Screenplay (Original)	Aavasavyuham	Krishnand R. K.	₹25,000
Best Screenplay (Adaptation)	Joji	Shyam Pushkaran	₹50,000
Best Lyrics	Kaadakalam ("Kanneer Kadanju")	B. K. Harinarayanan	₹50,000
Best Music Director (song)	Hridayam (All songs)	Hesham Abdul Wahab	₹50,000
Best Music Director (score)	Joji	Justin Varghese	₹50,000
Best Male Singer	Minnal Murali ("Raavil")	Pradeep Kumar	₹50,000
Best Female Singer	Kaanekkaane ("Paalnilavin")	Sithara Krishnakumar	₹50,000
Best Editor	Naayattu	Mahesh Narayanan; Rajesh Rajendran	₹50,000 each
Best Art Director	Thuramukham	A. V. Gokuldas	₹50,000
Best Sync Sound	Chavittu	Arun Ashok; Sonu K. P.	₹50,000
Best Sound Mixing	Minnal Murali	Justin Jose	₹50,000
Best Sound Design	Churuli	Renganaath Ravee	₹25,000
Best Visual Effects	Minnal Murali	Andrew D'Crus	
Best Processing Lab/Colourist	Churuli	Liju Prabhakar	₹50,000
Best Makeup Artist	Aarkkariyam	Ranjith Ambady	₹50,000
Best Costume Designer	Minnal Murali	Melwy J.	₹50,000
Best Dubbing Artist	No award	No award (Male category)	₹50,000
Best Dubbing Artist	Drishyam 2 (Character: Rani)	Devi S. (Female category)	₹50,000
Best Choreography	Chavittu	Arun Lal	₹25,000
Best Film with Popular Appeal and Aesthetic Value	Hridayam	Producers: Visakh Subramaniam	₹25,000
Best Film with Popular Appeal and Aesthetic Value	Hridayam	Director: Vineeth Sreenivasan	₹100,000
Best Debut Director	Prappeda	Krishnendu Kalesh	₹100,000
Best Children's Film	Kaadakalam	Producer: Periyar Valley Creations; Collective Frames	₹100,000
Best Children's Film	Kaadakalam	Director: Sakhil Raveendran	₹100,000
Special Jury Award	Avanovilona	Sherry Govindan (awarded for direction)	₹50,000

=== Special Jury Mention ===
All recipients receive a certificate and statuette.

Name of award	Title of film	Awardee(s)	Awarded for
Special Mention	Freedom Fight	Jeo Baby	Direction (Anthology short film: Old Age Home)

=== Special Award in Any Category for Women/Transgender ===
All recipients receive a cash prize, certificate, and statuette.

Name of award	Title of film	Awardee(s)	Awarded for	Cash prize
Special Award in Any Category for Women/Transgender	Antharam	Negha Shahin	Acting	₹50,000
