= V. P. Krishnakumar =

Indian sound engineer, editor and recorder

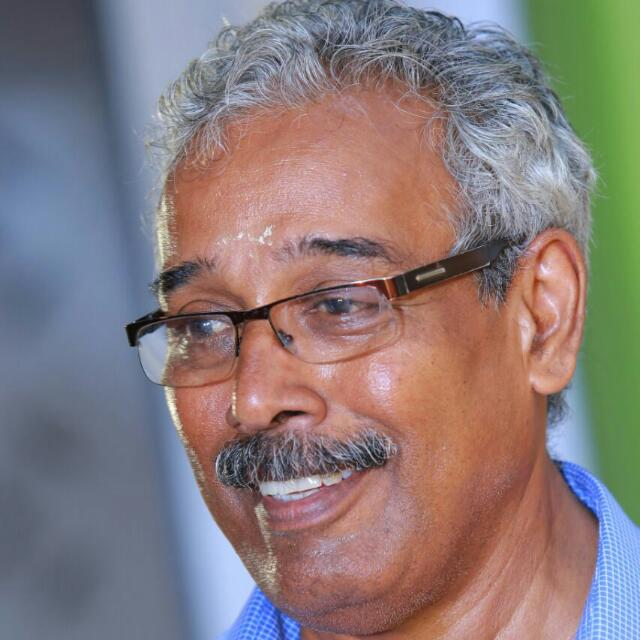
- Born: 8 September 1958 (age 68); Payyanur, Kerala, India
- Occupation: Sound editor
- Years active: 1981–present
- Notable work: Nizhalkuthu, Vasthuhara, Aakasha Gopuram, Kathavasheshan

Vannadil Puthiyaveettil "V. P." Krishnakumar (born 8 September 1958) is a sound engineer, editor and recordist known mostly for his works in Malayalam films, documentaries and TV series. He has worked with acclaimed film directors including G. Aravindan, Padmarajan, T. V. Chandran and K. P. Kumaran. He specializes in Sync sound—for many of his notable works, audio was recorded live. He has also worked on foreign projects, including a documentary with German documentary filmmaker and director Andreas Voigt. After long stints with Kerala State Film Development Corporation's Chitranjali Studio and Kalabhavan Digital Studios in Thiruvananthapuram, and Kochi, he heads the Department of Sound Recording at Chitranjali Studio, Thiruvananthapuram.

== Early life ==
V. P. Krishnakumar did his schooling in Payyanur and later went to Payyanur College. After completing a course in audio engineering from Chennai, he joined the Kerala State Film Development Corporation in 1981.

== Career ==
Krishnakumar started his career under the veteran sound engineer at Chitranjali Studio, P. Devadas. He later worked with famed directors like G. Aravindan, Padmarajan, Adoor Gopalakrishnan, T. V. Chandran, Santosh Sivan and K. P. Kumaran. Some of his work include movies like Koodevide, Vasthuhara, Marana Simhasanam, Ilayum Mullum Aakasha Gopuram, Nokkukuthi, Ore Thooval Pakshikal, Mukhamukham, Anantaram, Marattam, Rugmini, Kathavasheshan, Sufi Paranja Katha, Nizhalkuthu, Anandabhadram, Sancharam and Celluloid. He has also worked on the Hindi movie, Mr. Singh Mrs. Mehta—directed by Pravesh Bhardwaj—and the Anglo-Malayalam movie Before the Rains, directed by Santosh Sivan. Other acclaimed works include Chintha Ravi's Ente Keralam TV Series for Asianet.

He has worked with foreign filmmakers like Chitra Neogy of the New York University's Tisch School of the Arts and the German documentary filmmaker and director Andreas Voigt.

His recent non-Malayalam works include the Kokborok movie Yarwng and the Franco-German documentary "The Mahouts of Kerala" by Andreas Voigt. on Kerala's elephants and mahouts.

Velutha Rathrikal—the Irula language-Malayalam movie directed by Razi Muhammed, Pathirakalam, Amma—a documentary by veteran journalist Neelan— are some of his recent works.

He was recently a member of Kerala State Chalachitra Academy's TV Awards 2016 jury.

== Awards ==
Kerala State Television Awards for Best Audiographer

- 2000 - Annie, directed by Viji Thampi
- 2005 - Koottilekku, produced by Jeevan TV
- 2013 - Parethante Paribhavangal, produced by JaiHind TV
