= Vipin Nair =

Indian sound engineer

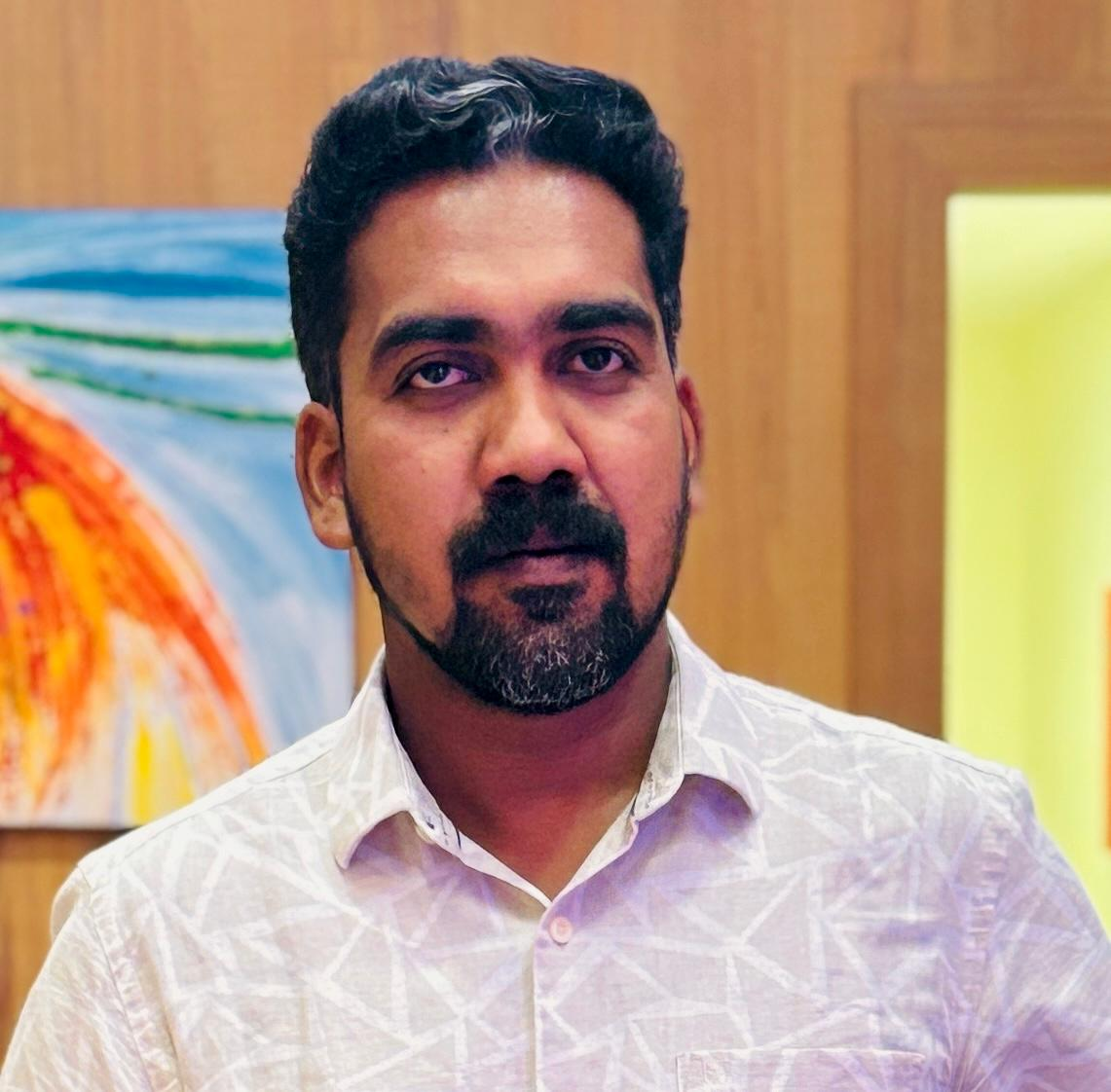
- Born: 31 October 1987 (age 38); Trivandrum, Kerala, India
- Occupation: Sound mixing engineer
- Years active: 2015–present
- Notable work: Nna Thaan Case Kodu, Hridayam, Aattam

Vipin Nair (born 31 October 1987) is an Indian sound mixing engineer predominantly working in the Malayalam film industry. He made his debut as an independent sound engineer with the film Sakhavu (2015), starring Nivin Pauly. As of 2024, he has worked on over 150 films across five languages, collaborating with more than 50 directors.

== Career ==
Vipin Nair began his professional journey after completing a diploma in sound engineering from the Amrita School of Media Science. He started as an assistant sound engineer at Amrita TV, followed by a brief tenure as a recordist at Navajyothi Studios. He later joined Chithranjali Studios, under the Kerala State Film Development Corporation (KSFDC), where he worked with several acclaimed sound professionals.

=== Notable works ===
Some of his notable works include:

- Varshangalkku Shesham (2024)
- Falimy (2024)
- Nadikalil Sundari Yamuna (2024)
- Ramachandra Boss & Co (2023)
- Kurukkan (2023)
- Mukundan Unni Associates (2024)
- Hridayam (2022)
- Nna Thaan Case Kodu (2022)

== Filmography ==
Year	Title	Language	Notes
2025	Karam	Malayalam	
	Oru Durooha Sahacharyathil	Malayalam	
	Pennum Porattum		
	Vala		
	Abhyanthara Kuttavaali		
2024	Mr. and Mrs. Bachelor		
	Oru Jaathi Jathakam		
	Oru Kattil Oru Muri		
	Chithini		
	Bharathanatyam		
	Nadanna Sambavam		
	Varshangalkku shesham		
	Exit		
2023	Rajani		
	Falimy		
	Aattam		JC Daniel Foundation Award for best sound mixing.
	Ullarivu		
	Nadhikalil Sundari Yamuna		
	Ramachandra Boss & Co		
	Jaladhara Pumpset Since 1962		
	Kurukkan		
	Thrishanku		
	Charles Enterprises		
	Kadina kadoramee Andakadaham		
	Madanolsavam		
	Pookkalm		
	Maheshum Marutiyum		
2022	Theru		
	Nna Than Case Kodu	Malayalam	Won the Kerala State Film Award for best sound mixing.
	Varayan		
	Meri Awas Suno		
	Oruthee		
	Kallan D’Souza		
	Karnan Napoleon Bhagat Singh		
	Hridayam	Malayalam	
2021	Oru Thathvika Avalokanam		
	Kanakam Kaamimi Kalaham		
	Varthamanam		
	Mmmmm: Sound of Pain		
2020	2 States		
	Love FM		
2019	Jimmy Ee Veedinte Aiswaryam		
	Aakashaganga II		Associate Sound Mixing
	Edakkad Battalion 06		Associate Sound Mixing
	Aadhya Rathri		Associate Sound Mixing
	March Randam Vyazham		Associate Sound Mixing
	Finals		Associate Sound Mixing
	Love Action Drama		Associate Sound Mixing
	Aniyan Kunjum Thannalayathu		Associate Sound Mixing
	Chila NewGen Nattuvisheshangal		Associate Sound Mixing
	Sachin		Associate Sound Mixing
	A Sunday		Associate Sound Mixing
	Evidey		Associate Sound Mixing
	O.P.160/18 Kakshi : Amminippilla		Associate Sound Mixing
	Jeem Boom Bhaa		Sound Mixing
	Oronnonnara Pranayakadha		Associate Sound Mixing
	Argentina Fans Kaattoorkadavu		Associate Sound Mixing
	Neeyum Njanum		Sound Mixing
	Janaadhipan		Associate Sound Mixing
2018			

== Awards and recognition ==
- 2022 – Kerala State Film Award for Best Sound Mixing for Nna Thaan Case Kodu
- 2023 – J.C. Daniel Foundation Award for Best Sound Mixing for Aattam
