= Queer Casting =

- Abbreviation: QC
- Founder: Negha Shahin And Rizwan Bharathi
- Founded at: Tamil Nadu, India
- Purpose: Advocacy, Media Visibility and Rights for Queer And Trans Individuals, Skill Development
- Headquarters: Tamil Nadu, India
- Region served: India

Queer Casting (QC) is an organization that advocates for the inclusion of LGBTQ+ individuals in the entertainment of India. It was founded by Negha Shahin, a transgender woman, and Rizwan Bharathi, a transgender man.

== History ==
Queer Casting was founded by Shahin and Bharathi (a trans couple), who are queer and transgender activists in Tamil Nadu. Negha Shahin was the first trans woman to win the debut actor award at the 52nd Kerala State Film Awards, while Rizwan Bharathi is a co-author of Love is Love.

Queer Casting was established to increase participation of transgender and queer in the entertainment industry. The organization advocates for the rights and awareness of transgender and queer individuals, and offers various workshops to assist with developing professional experience.

== Work ==
Shahin and Bharathi have been demanding media portrayal of LGBT people by developing skills and building employment opportunities in the media industry for trans and queer individuals. Industry analytics have found that Mass media in India still tends to follow stereotypical paths, often overlooking and undermining the transgender and queer community.

In September 2023, the inaugural QC workshop was completed with participation from over 18 transgender and queer individuals. They worked alongside various directors and actors, notably Mysskin and Sasikumar.

In June 2024, observed worldwide as Pride Month, the organisation hosted "Pride Palooza" in Chennai, Tamil Nadu. This event featured a keynote of the first southern trans men panel discussion in India and the 106th performance of A. Revathi's play "Vellai Mozhi," as well as an award ceremony with several other activities.
