= Krishna Kumar =

Krishna Kumar is an Indian name and may refer to:

- Kumar Krishna (1928–2014), American entomologist
- R. K. Krishna Kumar (1938–2023), Indian business executive
- C. P. Krishnakumar (born 1939), Indian Kannada writer
- P. R. Krishna Kumar (1951–2020), Indian physician
- V. P. Krishnakumar (born 1958), Indian sound recordist
- Krishna Kumar (actor) (born 1968), Tamil and Malayalam actor
- Krishna Kumar (chemist) (born 1970), chemistry professor at Tufts University
- K (composer) (born 1987), stage name of Indian composer Krishna Kumar
- Krishna Kumar (cricketer) (born 1991), Indian cricketer
- Krishna Kumar (educationist), Indian intellectual and academician

== See also ==
- Krishna Kumari (disambiguation)
