= Krishna Kumari =

Krishna Kumari may refer to:

- Krishna Kumari (princess) (1794–1810), princess of Udaipur princely state of India
- Krishna Kumari (regent) (1926–2018), last reigning Maharani of Marwar-Jodhpur
- Krishna Kumari (actress) (1933–2018), Telugu actress of the 1960s and 1970s
- Krishna Kumari (politician) (1908–1962), politician and Rajya Sabha member from Madhya Pradesh
- Krishna Kumari Kohli, Pakistani politician and member of the Senate of Pakistan
- Krishna Kumari (born 1934), Hindi actress of 1950s and 1960s who acted in many films including Nagin

== See also ==
- Krishna Kumar (disambiguation)
