= T. Krishnanunni =

Indian sound designer

T Krishnanunni
- Born: 12 June 1960 (age 66); Ottapalam, Kerala State, India
- Occupations: Sound design, Sound recording

T. Krishnanunni is a sound designer in India. He has received multiple National Film Awards and Kerala State Film Awards. He has worked with almost all the eminent film makers in Kerala, including Adoor Gopalakrishnan, G. Aravindan and Shaji N. Karun.

== Biography ==
T Krishnanunni was born in 1960 in Ottapalam Graduated in Physics from St.Joseph's College, Devagiri, Kozhikode under the University of Kerala. Joined the Film and Television Institute of India, Pune for the Sound Recording & Sound Engineering course. Passed out from the FTII in 1976. He joined the Space Applications Centre in Ahmedabad as sound recordist in their Khedda Communications Project in 1977. Left Ahmedabad in 1980 to join Chitranjali Studio under the Kerala State Film Development Corporation in Trivandrum as sound recordist.

== Career in sound design ==
Worked for twenty eight years in Chirtranjali Studio and was the Chief Sound Engineer on retirement in June, 2008. Presently freelancing in sound designing and short film making. During the career in the Chitranjali Studio, received President's awards thrice for Audiography for films Anantaram directed by Sri Adoor Gopalakrishnan, Piravi directed by Sri Shaji .N.Karun and Desadanam directed by Sri Jayaraj. Have also received nine awards for audiography from the government of Kerala. The last one was for the film "Oru Pennum Randanum" directed by Sri Adoor Gopalakrishan, in 2008. Received the President's award for the best director for a biographical documentary on Vaidya Ratnam P.S.Warrier produced by Kerala State Film Development Corporation, Trivandrum, for the Public Relations Department in 2005. Have done sound design for films like "KuttySrank " by Shaji N Karun and "Bhoomiyute Avakasikal" by T. V .Chandran. Recently worked as sound designer for the film "Swapanam " directed by Shaji N Karun and "Oralpokkam " directed by Sanal Kumar Sasidharan He was also the sound mixer for the documentary, Kumaranelloorile Kulangal (Ponds of Kumaranelloor) (2016) directed by MA Rahman and written by Jnanpith award winner MT Vasudeven Nair. The primary subject of this documentary is also MT Vasudevan Nair

== Career in direction ==
Have directed several documentaries for the Information and Public Relations Department, Government of Kerala, a documentary for the Archaeology Department, Government of Kerala and a series of documentaries for the Kottakkal Arya Vaidya Sala, Kottakkal, Malapuram.

== As an author ==
Authored a book called "Sound in Moving Pictures" published by Mathrubhumi Publications, Kozhikode, Kerala in December 2010.

== Awards and accolades ==
National Film Award for Best Audiographys:

- 1987 - National Film Award for Best Audiography - Anantaram
- 1988 - National Film Award for Best Audiography - Piravi
- 1996 - National Film Award for Best Audiography - Desadanam

Kerala State Film Awards:

- 1987 - Kerala State Film Award for Best Sound Recordist - Purushartham
- 1989 - Kerala State Film Award for Best Sound Recordist
- 1994 - Kerala State Film Award for Best Sound Recordist - Swam
- 1995 - Kerala State Film Award for Best Sound Recordist - Kazhakam, Ormakalundayirikkanam
- 1996 - Kerala State Film Award for Best Sound Recordist - Desadanam
- 1997 - Kerala State Film Award for Best Sound Recordist - Janmadinam
- 1998 - Kerala State Film Award for Best Sound Recordist - Agnisakshi
- 2007 - Kerala State Film Award for Best Sound Recordist - Ottakkayyan
- 2008 - Kerala State Film Award for Best Sound Recordist - Oru Pennum Randaanum
