= Kerala Film Critics Association Awards 2021 =

Annual Indian film awards ceremony

45th Kerala Film Critics Association Awards
- Organized by: Kerala Film Critics Association

The 45th Kerala Film Critics Association Awards, recognising excellence in various categories of Malayalam-language films released in 2021, were announced in October 2022.

== Winners ==
=== Main awards ===
- Best Film: Aavasavyuham (Krishand)
- Best Actor: Dulquer Salmaan - Kurup, Salute
- Best Actress: Durga Krishna - Udal
- Best Director: Martin Prakkat - Nayattu
- Second Best Film: Minnal Murali (Basil Joseph)
- Second Best Actor: Unni Mukundan - Meppadiyan
- Second Best Actress: Manju Pillai - Home
- Best Screenplay: Jeethu Joseph - Drishyam 2
- Best Music Director: Hesham Abdul Wahab - Hridayam, Madhuram
- Best Lyricist: Jayakumar K Pavithran - Ente Mazha
- Best Male Playback Singer: Sooraj Santhosh - "Ganame" from Madhuram
- Best Female Playback Singer: Aparna Rajeev - "Thira Thodum" from Thuruthu
- Best Cinematographer: Aslam K Purayil - Salute
- Best Film Editor: Prejish Prakash - Home
- Best Art Director: Manu Jagadh (Minnal Murali)
- Best Makeup Artist: Benoy Kollam (Thuruthu)
- Best Costume Designer: Arun Manohar (Sabash Chandra Bose)
- Best Popular Film: Hridayam (Vineeth Sreenivasan)
- Best Debut Directors: Sanu John Varghese (Aarkkariyam), Varghese Lal (Iru), Benoy Veloor (Moscow Kavala), K. S. Hariharan (Kaalachekon), Sujith Lal (Randu)

=== Special Jury Awards ===
- Special Jury Award for Direction: V. C. Abhilash (Sabash Chandra Bose)
- Special Jury Award for Film: Chalachitram (Directed by Abdul Gafoor)
- Special Jury Award for Presentation of Anti-Drug Theme: College Cuties (Directed by A. K. B. Kumar)
- Special Jury Award for Production: Shanta Murali (Sara's), Mathew Mambra (Cheraathukal)
- Special Jury Award for Acting: Bheeman Raghu (Kaalachekon), Priyanka Nair (Aa Mukham), Kalabhavan Rahman (Randu), Vishnu Unnikrishnan (Randu, Red River), Shruti Ramachandran (Madhuram), Ratheesh Ravi (Dharani), Anoop Khalid (Six Hours)
- Special Jury Award for Lyrics: Lekha B. Kumar (College Cuties)
- Special Jury Award for Female Playback Singer: P. K. Medini (Thee)
- Special Jury Award for Cinematography: Unni Madavoor (Holy Wound)
- Special Jury Award for Presentation of Diverse Subjects: Dharani (Directed by Srivallabhan), Holy Wound (Directed by Ashok R Nath) and Aa Mukham (Directed by Abhilash Purushothaman)

=== Honorary Awards ===
- Chalachitra Ratnam Award: Joshiy
- Ruby Jubilee Award: Suresh Gopi
- Chalachitra Prathibha Award: Revathi, Urvashi, Babu Namboothiri, Kochu Preman
