= Agnisakshi (1999 film) =

- CD cover
- Directed by: Shyamaprasad
- Screenplay by: Shyamaprasad
- Based on: Agnisakshi by Lalithambika Antharjanam
- Produced by: V V Babu
- Starring: Rajit Kapur; Shobana; Srividya; Praveena; Madhupal; Madambu Kunhukuttan
- Cinematography: Alagappan N.
- Edited by: Beena Paul
- Music by: Kaithapram Damodaran
- Production company: Srishti Films
- Release date: 1999
- Running time: 100 minutes
- Country: India
- Language: Malayalam

Agnisakshi (English: With Fire As Witness) is a 1999 Indian Malayalam-language spiritual film written and directed by Shyamaprasad, based on the novel of the same name by Lalithambika Antharjanam. It stars Rajit Kapur, Shobana, Srividya, Praveena, Madhupal and Madambu Kunhukuttan. The film premiered at the Soorya Festival on 14 September 1998. Agnisakshi received numerous accolades, including the National Film Award for Best Feature Film in Malayalam and nine Kerala State Film Awards. The film holds the distinction of winning 9 Kerala State Film Awards.

== Plot and themes ==
Unni accepts Devaki as his wife and brings her into the fold of his Namboothiri illam. Bound by a plethora of traditional beliefs, customs and rituals that constitute life within four walls of the joint family, Unni is unable to be the husband that he would have liked to be. Yet, they understand and love each other immensely. Guarded by the fortress of tradition, the family remains oblivious to the winds of change sweeping through society. Though Unni is aware, he shuts the door to everything that his family will never be able to comprehend or accept. But Devaki, who is essentially of a different mould, longs to step out into the world - and is finally forced to do so. Set in early 1930s, the story develops within walls of a Namboothiri Illam, in the South Indian state of Kerala, against the backdrop of the struggle for freedom from the British rule. The film opens in Haridwar, a holy city, where Thankam, Unni's younger half sister (of same father; Unni's mother was Namboothiri and Thankam's mother was Nair) has come to immerse Unni's ashes in the Ganga and trace Devaki, who now is an ascetic. The story is revealed through the reminiscences of Thankam, a mute spectator who is caught between these characters and the complexities of their relationship - complexities that can never be relegated to the realms of right and wrong.

== Cast ==
- Shobana as Devaki (voice by bhagyalekshmi)
- Rajit Kapur as Unni (voice by murali menon & venmani vishnu)
- Srividya as Thankam
- Praveena as younger Thankam
- Madhupal
- Madampu Kunjukuttan
- Sreenath
- Krishna Kumar

== Soundtrack ==
Agnisakshi

Soundtrack album by Kaithapram
- Released: October 3, 1999
- Genre: Film soundtrack
- Labels: Johny Sagariga; T-Series

The album consists of 9 tracks all written (except Aathole and Sa virahe) and composed by Kaithapram Damodaran Namboothiri.

| No. | Title | Singer(s) | Raagam | Notes |
|---|---|---|---|---|
| 1 | Jwaalamukhamaay | K. J. Yesudas | | |
| 2 | Vaarthinkaludhikkaatha | K. S. Chithra | Kapi | |
| 3 | Gange Maha Mangale | K. J. Yesudas, Sindhu | Chakravakam | |
| 4 | Kannaanthali Muttathe | Sujatha Mohan | | |
| 5 | Vaarthinkaludhikkaatha | K. J. Yesudas | Kapi | |
| 6 | Saa Virahe | Kavalam Sreekumar | Dwijavanthi | Written by Jayadeva |
| 7 | Mangalaathira | Sudha Ranjith | | |
| 8 | Pankajavairi | Sudha Ranjith | | |
| 9 | Aathole Kunjaathole | Sudha Ranjith | | Traditional lyrics |

== Awards ==
National Film Awards – 1998

- National Film Award for Best Feature Film in Malayalam - V V Babu

Kerala State Film Awards – 1998

- Best Film - V V Babu
- Best Director - Shyamaprasad
- Best Actor - Rajit Kapur
- Second Best Actress - Praveena
- Best Cinematographer - Azhagappan
- Best Sound Recordist - Krishnanunni, Hussain
- Best Makeup Artist - P. Mani, Vikram Gaekwad
- Best Dubbing Artist - Murali Menon, Vennmani Vishnu
- Best Processing Lab - Gemini Lab

Kerala State Film Critics Awards

- Best Film - V V Babu
- Best Director - Shyamaprasad
- Best Lyrics - Kaithaprom
- Best Actress - Shobana
- Best Cinematographer - Azhagappan
- Best Art Director - Premachandran

Other awards

- Aravindan Puraskar for Best Director - Shyamaprasad
- Gollapudi Srinivas Award for Best Director - Shyamaprasad
