= Chavittu =

Malayalam-language film

- Directed by: Shinos Rahman; Sajas Rahman
- Written by: Shinos Rahman; Sajas Rahman
- Produced by: Sharaf U Dheen
- Cinematography: Mukesh Muraleedharan
- Edited by: Shinos Rahman; Sajas Rahman
- Music by: Ajeesh Anto
- Release date: January 2022 (IFFR)
- Running time: 85 minutes
- Country: India
- Language: Malayalam

Chavittu (lit. 'Stomp') is a 2022 Indian Malayalam-language drama film written, edited and directed by Rahman brothers, Shinos & Sajas. The film is the maiden production of actor Sharaf U Dheen under the banner Sharafudheen & Friends. The members of the Little Earth Theatre troupe based in Malappuram form the major cast of the film. A hybrid of documentary and dramatisation, the film pays homage to the talented and hardworking theatre artists while juxtaposing it with the hypocrisy of the supposed elite society.

The film premiered at the Harbour section of International Film Festival Rotterdam and also got screened at 25th International Film Festival of Kerala in the Malayalam Cinema Today category. The film won several awards at the 52nd Kerala State Film Awards in 2022.

== Synopsis ==
Somewhere in the Indian state of Kerala, a theatre company prepares for its performance during festivities. They arrive early, rehearse their piece, and put the finishing touches to the scenery. This alternates with atmospheric scenes of men rehearsing, singing, and perfecting choreographies at a remote location in nature. In the meantime, the theatre slowly fills with other acts, family, and organisers who sometimes interfere with the theatre group. When evening has come at last, various acts are performed and speeches are given before the group can finally stand in the spotlights.

== Cast ==
- Arun Lal
- Rajesh MP
- Akhil KP
- Mithun Lal
- Suresh K
- Srijesh K
- Abit PT

== Awards ==
Arun Asok and Sonu KP won the National Film Award for Best Sound Design in the Location Sound Recordist category for their work on Chavittu, at the 69th National Film Awards.

At the 52nd Kerala State Film Awards, the film received awards in several categories:

- Second Best Film
- Best Sound Recordist, Best Sync Sound category (Arun Asok and Sonu KP)
- Best Choreography (Arun Lal)
