= Nishiddho =

- Theatrical release poster
- Directed by: Tara Ramanujan
- Written by: Tara Ramanujan
- Starring: Kani Kusruti; Tanmay Dhanania
- Cinematography: Manesh Madhavan
- Edited by: Anzar Chennatt
- Music by: Debojyoti Mishra
- Production company: Kerala State Film Development Corporation
- Release date: 11 November 2022
- Running time: 124 minutes
- Country: India
- Language: Malayalam

Nishiddho is a 2022 Indian Malayalam-language film written and directed by debutant Tara Ramanujan, featuring Kani Kusruti and Tanmay Dhanania in lead roles. It won national and international awards at IFFK, Kerala State Films, Ottawa and was screened at many national and international festivals. It was produced by Kerala State Film Development Corporation.

== Cast ==
- Kani Kusruti as Chaavi
- Tanmay Dhanania as Rudra
- Santha Jagannathan as Kathamma / Paatti

== Production ==
The film is the debut of director Tara Ramanujan. It is produced by the Kerala State Film Development Corporation to support aspiring women filmmakers.

== Reception ==
=== Critical reception ===
Prathibha Joy of OTTplay gave 3 stars out of 5 and stated "As a debutant filmmaker, Tara's valiant attempt to tell a hard-hitting story deserves applause." Critics from India Today and Manorama Online gave mixed reviews.

== Accolades ==
Nishiddho won the Best Feature Film award at the Ottawa Indian Film Festival, the Best Indian Director award at the International Film Festival of Kerala, and the Second Best Film award at the 52nd Kerala State Film Awards. It was screened at the New York Indian Film Festival, Bengaluru International Film Festival, Kolkata International Film Festival, Dhaka International Film Festival, and NGIIFF Frankfurt/Koln.
