= The Road (2023 film) =

Indian film by Arun Vaseegaran

- Theatrical release poster
- Directed by: Arun Vaseegaran
- Written by: Arun Vaseegaran
- Starring: Trisha Krishnan; Shabeer Kallarakkal; Santhosh Prathap
- Cinematography: K. G. Venkatesh
- Edited by: A. R. Shivaraj
- Music by: Sam C. S.
- Production company: AAA Cinemaa
- Release date: 6 October 2023
- Running time: 142 minutes
- Country: India
- Language: Tamil

The Road is a 2023 Indian Tamil-language crime thriller film written and directed by Arun Vaseegaran in his directorial debut. The film stars Trisha Krishnan as Meera, who sets out to find the real cause of a tragedy that has befallen her family. The cast also features Shabeer Kallarakkal, Santhosh Prathap, Miya George, Vivek Prasanna, Vela Ramamoorthy and M. S. Bhaskar.

The Road was released on 6 October 2023 to mixed reviews from critics.

== Plot ==
Meera lives happily with her husband Anand, a wildlife photographer, and her son, Kavin. During pregnancy, she and her husband plan a road trip to Kanyakumari on Kavin's birthday. Upon the doctor's advice, she decides to skip the journey and asks Anand to continue the journey with Kavin.

Anand and Kavin die on the way when their car collides with businessman Gangadharan's car that was heading to Chennai. Following the accident, Meera's friend Uma and her husband Prasad reach the hospital and inform Meera about it. Meera reaches the hospital and falls unconscious after hearing about her husband and son's deaths. She attempts suicide after losing her unborn child, but Uma's timely intervention saves her.

While Meera and Uma visit the accident site where Uma drives her car faster to the site and suddenly Uma's car didn't get start due to fault after the repair of her car, they meet Kaaturosa, who takes them to her house. Through Kaaturosa's father, Meera and Uma learn about the accidents that have happened on the route before. Meera witnesses an accident on the road and reports it to sub-inspector M. Moorthy of the Tirumangalam police station. He finds no trace of the car or the person at the scene, but head constable M. Subramani suspects that something has happened.

Meera sets out to find out the reason behind accidents occurring only in a particular zone on the NH 44. At the police station, Gangadharan's son, Sundar, tells Meera that his father was not drunk while driving. Meera and Subramani approach Dr. Madhana Gopal, who prepared the autopsy report. On his suggestion, they seek the help of forensic experts to look for any alcohol traces in Gangadharan's car. The forensic team discovers caltrops on the vehicle's tyre but no indications of alcohol traces.

Meera and Subramani find Ponnudurai, who forcefully infused alcohol into Gangadharan's body for money. They learn that he received money from the bank account of a villager and find Bhaskaran, who was responsible for transferring it. Bhaskaran reveals the existence of a secret network behind everything. Uma tells Meera about dark banking and how several underprivileged people receive money through bank accounts under Bhaskaran's control. Meera tells Uma about how the secret network headed by an unknown person targets travellers on the National Highway to loot money and jewels, and that they targeted Gangadharan's car to rob something other than money.

Meera discovers that Kaaturosa has admitted her husband, son, and Gangadharan to the hospital. Kaaturosa, who witnessed the accident, reveals the involvement of Prasad in Gangadharan's car robbery. Meera and Subramani trace the gang's location from the geographic coordinates received on Bhaskaran's mobile. There, they are held hostage by the gang members. Prasad appears with them and tells Meera about his intentions. Chella, the gang leader's friend, tries to kill Meera. But Uma arrives suddenly with a gun and helps Meera and Subramani escape.

Meera finds a house under Prasad's possession with Uma's help and realises that he is the one who controls the entire network from a private number. Subramani calls Meera and tells her about Chella's friend Mayazhagan, who was a college professor ten years ago until the incident that sacked him; he had unsuccessfully tried to find another job to pay off his family's dues through a local minister who offered to help him but subsequently died in a car crash and his successor just rescinded that offer. Chella and Mayazhagan tried gambling but they lost all of their money, resulting in the latter's immediate eviction and his father's suicide. Out of vengeance and survival, Chella then convinced his friend to start a crime syndicate where they would murder people and rob the highway blind, getting the Kottai-Manga gang under their thumb and later recruiting Prasad. From his laptop, Meera learns that Gangadharan was actually a gold-smuggling consultant, and he planned to smuggle 500 kg of gold from Kerala to Mumbai through NH 44.

Mayazhagan makes a plan to attack Arumai Chandran, the minister's benami, who is going to smuggle gold per Gangadharan's plan. As per Mayazhagan's plan, Chella and Prasad snatch Arumai Chandran's car on the way and leave him. While calling Chella, Mayazhagan realises that Arumai Chandran is not in the car and that there is no gold inside. He tells Chella to get down, but an explosion kills both Chella and Prasad. Meera comes on call and challenges Mayazhagan to come look for her.

Meera learns about Padma, alias Padmapriya, Arumai Chandran's second wife, and a smuggler herself. She suspects that Padma arrived in Kerala with a different plan, as she was not involved in the ongoing smuggling. Meera targets Padma, who is travelling with smuggled gold, and kidnaps her to Prasad's house. Mayazhagan finds Meera there and injures her. He falls upon seeing Padma, who was actually responsible for all the woes he faced in the past by trying to force him into having relations when she was his student and subsequently framing him for harassment when he refused for the last time. Meanwhile, Padma moved on and married Arumai Chandran. Meera kills Mayazhagan when he attempts to avenge Padma for destroying his life.

== Cast ==
- Trisha Krishnan as Meera
- Shabeer Kallarakkal as Mayazhagan "Maya"
- Santhosh Prathap as Anand
- Miya George as Uma Devi K.
- Lakshmi Priya as Padmapriya "Priya"
- Vivek Prasanna as Prasad
- Vela Ramamoorthy as Chinnaswamy, Mayazhagan's father
- M. S. Bhaskar as Head constable M. Subramani
- Ganesh Gopinath as Chella
- Semmalar Annam as Manga, head the of Kottai-Manga highway criminal gang
- Saathvik as Kavin
- Negha Shahin as Kaaturosa
- Vinod Sagar as Bhaskaran
- G. Gnanasambandam as the college principal
- Ajit Koshy as Gangadharan
- Janaki Suresh as the gynaecologist
- Karuppu Nambiar as SI M. Moorthy
- Supergood Subramani as Kaaturosa's father
- Rahul Thatha as Kattaerumbu
- Benito Franklin as Sundar
- Kumar Natarajan as Dr. Madhana Gopal
- Vijay Peter as Arumai Chandran

== Production ==
The film is the directorial debut of Arun Vaseegaran. The title of the film was revealed on 25 April 2022. Filming began in May 2022, and was nearing completion in July 2022.

== Soundtrack ==
The soundtrack was composed by Sam C. S.

The Road

Soundtrack album by Sam C. S.
- Released: 2023
- Genre: Feature film soundtrack
- Length: 9:11
- Language: Tamil
- Label: Tips Tamil
- Producer: Sam C. S.

Sam C. S. chronology
Red Sandalwood (2023)	The Road (2023)	Raid (2023)

Track listing
No.	Title	Lyrics	Singer(s)	Length
1.	"Dummalangi"	Sam C. S.	Chinmayi, Sameera Baradwaj	4:00
2.	"Nagaraatha Nodiyodu"	Karthik Netha	Kapil Kapilan	4:09
3.	"Oh Vidhi"	Karthik Netha	Sid Sriram	5:02
4.	"Veera"	Karthik Netha	Arunraja Kamaraj, Sam C. S.	3:57
Total length:				17:08

== Release ==
The film was released on 6 October 2023 in theatres. It began streaming on Aha from 10 November 2023.

== Critical response ==
The Road received mixed reviews from critics.

M. Suganth of The Times of India gave 2.5 out of 5 stars and wrote, "The investigation part largely works, and the director manages to keep the mystery under wraps until the reveal, but the film turns pretty generic once we get the identity of the mastermind behind the chilling crimes." K. Janani of India Today gave 2 out of 5 stars and wrote, "'The Road' could have been a solid thriller with a few surprises in the screenplay. Unfortunately, there are only a few redeeming aspects in the film."

Anusha Sundar of Cinema Express gave 1.5 out of 5 stars and wrote, "The Road isn't just a substandard mixed bag of many elements together but has a problematic moral compass on pressing issues of today's times." Bhuvanesh Chander of The Hindu wrote, "For Trisha, who once again shows that she deserves a script worth her stardom and heart, The Road offers nothing new and her poor run with solo lead films continues." Swathi P. Ajith of Onmanorama wrote, "The film deserves recognition for its attempt to introduce a fresh concept, intertwining two parallel narratives and merging them into a coherent storyline."
