= N. Mohanan =

Indian writer (1933–1999)

N. Mohanan (27 April 1933 – 3 October 1999) was a Malayalam-language short story writer and novelist from Kerala, India. He was awarded the Nalapadan Award (Nalapaddan Memorial Cultural Society, Kunnathur, Punnayurkulam) in 1991 for his short story Sheshapathram. He received the Kerala Sahitya Akademi Award in the year 1998 for the novel Innalathe Mazha.. He was a Kerala state government officer and retired as director of department of Culuture.

He has published some ten collections of short stories including Ninte Katha (Enteyum), Dukhathinte Rathrikal, Poojakkedukkatha Pookkal, N. Mohanante Kathakal, Sheshapathram, Nunayude Kshanikathakal Thedi, Snehathinte Vyakaranam, Nishedha Rajyathile Rajavu and Orikkal. He was the son of noted Malayalam writer Lalithambika Antharjanam, and A. N. Narayanan Namboothiri of Amanakara Illam, Pala, Kottayam district.

He wrote screenplay for an unreleased Malayalam movie 'Anna' supposed to be directed by Joshiy with Arvind Swamy and Meena in lead roles. One of the songs 'Yavana Kadhayil Ninnu' recorded for this shelved movie is recently used in 2026 malayalm Movie Bethlehem Kudumba Unit.
