= Krishand R. K. =

Indian filmmaker

Krishand
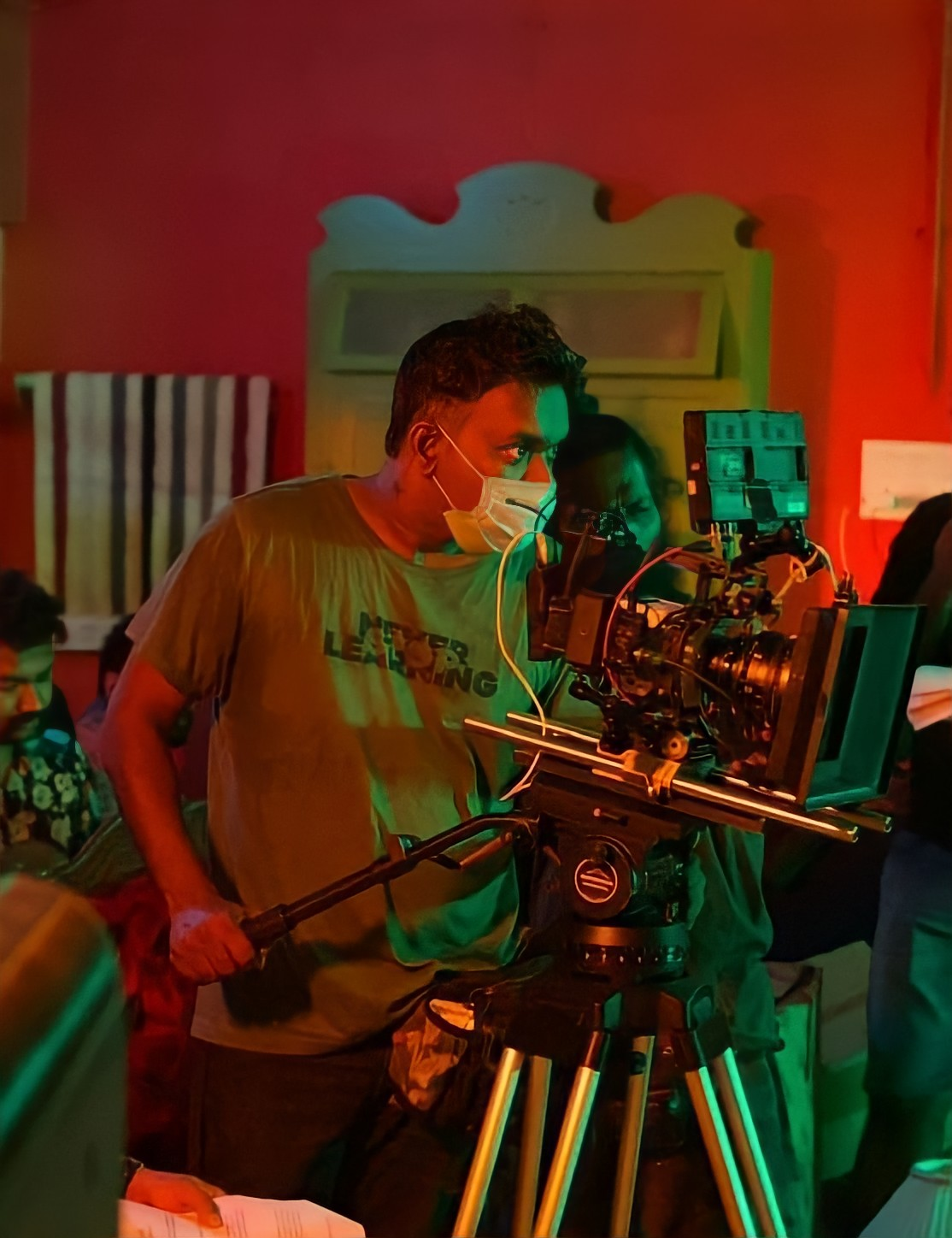
- Born: Krishand R. K. Thiruvananthapuram, Kerala, India
- Education: Mohandas College of Engineering and Technology, Nedumangad, Trivandrum IIT Bombay
- Occupations: Director; cinematographer; producer; screenwriter
- Years active: 2012 – present
- Awards: Kerala State Film Awards; Padmarajan Award

Krishand R. K., professionally credited as Krishand, is an Indian film director, screenwriter, cinematographer and producer, who works in Malayalam cinema. He has won a National Film Award and two Kerala State Film Awards and a Padmarajan Award for his film Aavasavyuham.

== Early life ==
Krishand received his Bachelor of Technology from Mohandas College of Engineering and Technology in Thiruvananthapuram. He got his Master of Design from IDC School of Design, IIT Bombay.

== Career ==
Krishand began his career in 2012 as a screenwriter in the short film Flames. He has also scripted and directed the short films, Mombattiyan and Bhagavthikaavile Paapikal.

In 2018, the web series Utsaha Ithihasam on Zee5, directed by Krishand received a nomination in the Seoul Webfest and won Best Dramedy award.

In 2018, he made his feature film debut in Malayalam as a director of Vrithakrithyilulla Chathuram. It competed in the International Film Festival of Kerala (IFFK)'s international competition category. The film won a Kerala State Film Award for Best Background Music.

His second film, Aavasavyuham, competed in the 26th IFFK (IFFK 2021). where it won the FIPRESCI and NETPAC Award. It also won the Kerala State Film Award for Best Screenplay and Kerala State Film Award for Best Film.

== Filmography ==
†	Denotes films that have not yet been released

=== Films ===
Year	Title	Credits	Notes	Ref.
2012	Flame	Co-writer	Short film	
2013	Mombattiyan	Director, writer, editor	Short film	
2013	Slight	Cinematographer	Short film	
2013	Interval 3D	Cinematographer	Anthology segment in Shuruaat Ka Interval	
2014	Ghoda 22	Director, writer	Short film	
2016	Bhagavathikaavile Paapikal	Director, cinematographer	Short film	
2019	Water Bodies	Director, cinematographer	Documentary short	
2019	Vrithakrithyilulla Chathuram	Director, cinematographer		
2021	Aavasavyuham	Director, writer, producer		
2023	Purusha Pretham	Director, cinematographer		
2024	Gaganachari	Co-producer	Krishand Films (in association with)	
2025	Sangarsha Ghadana - The Art of Warfare	Director, writer, producer		
2026	Masthishka Maranam – A Frankenbiting of Simon's Memories	Director, writer, Co-producer		

=== Web series ===
Year	Title	Crew role	Notes	Ref.
2018	Utsaha Ithihasam	Director		
2020	Ennum Varunna Dhoomakedhu	Writer, producer		
2022	Kraya Vikraya Prakriya	Director, writer, cinematographer		
2025	The Chronicles of the 4.5 Gang	Director, writer		

== Accolades ==
List of awards and nominations
Year	Award	Category	Work	Result	Ref.
2023	69th National Film Awards	National Film Award for Best Film on Environment Conservation/Preservation	Aavasavyuham	Won	
2022	26th International Film Festival of Kerala (IFFK 2021)	FIPRESCI Award for Best Malayalam film	Aavasavyuham	Won	
2022	26th International Film Festival of Kerala (IFFK 2021)	NETPAC Award for Best Malayalam film	Aavasavyuham	Won	
2022	52nd Kerala State Film Awards	Best Film	Aavasavyuham	Won	
2022	52nd Kerala State Film Awards	Best Screenplay (Original)	Aavasavyuham	Won	
2022	13th J. C. Foundation Award	Best film	Aavasavyuham	Won	
2022	29th Padmarajan Awards	Best Director	Krishand RK / Aavasavyuham (Note: shared with Sidhartha Siva / Aanu)	Won	
2022	29th Padmarajan Awards	Best Screenplay	Krishand RK / Aavasavyuham	Won	
