= Negha Shahin =

Indian actress (born 1993)

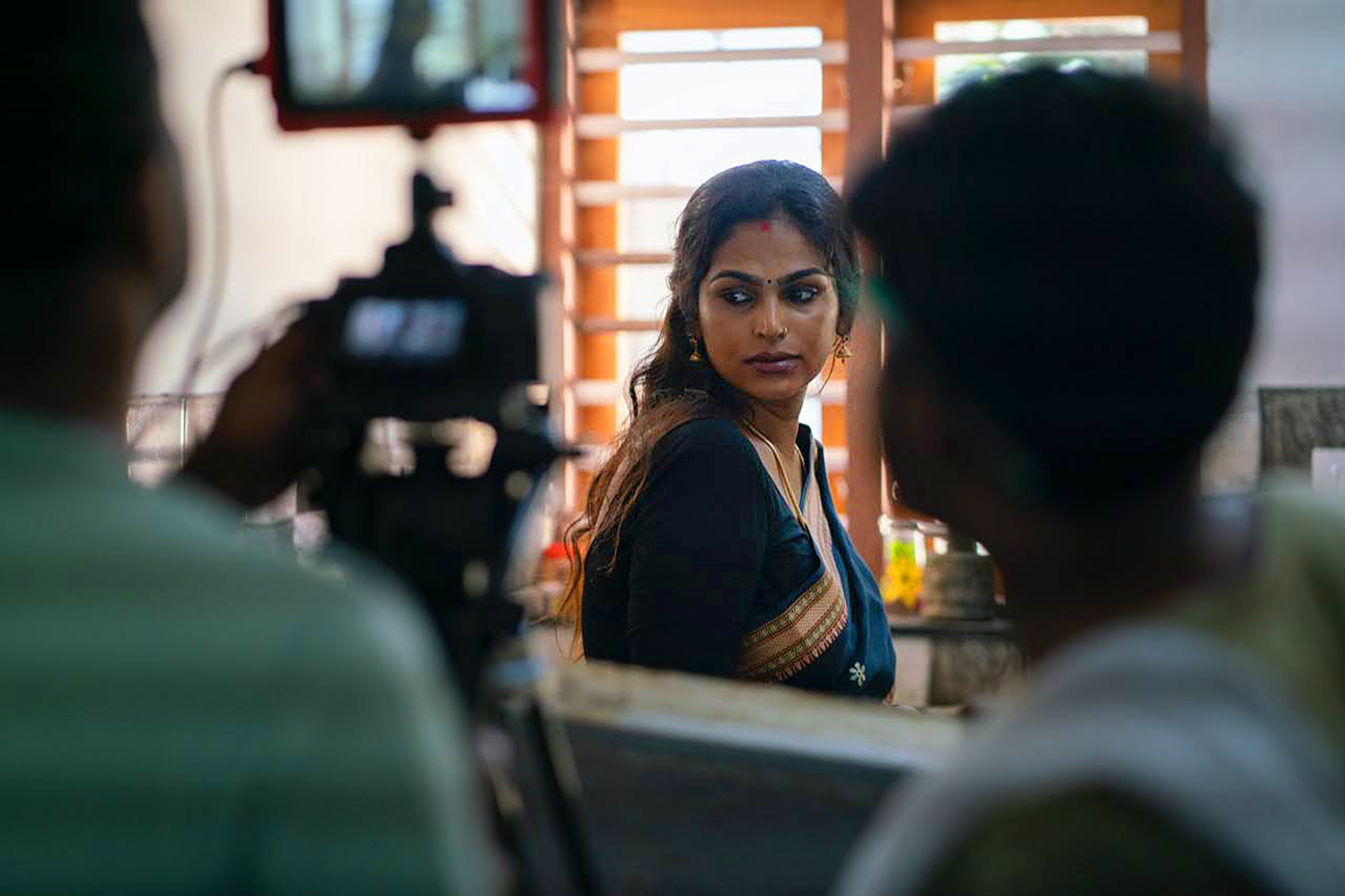
- Negha in 2021
- Born: 1993 (age 32–33); Tamil Nadu, India
- Occupations: Actress; Writer; VJ; Founder; Queer and Trans rights Artivism

Negha Shahin (born 1993) is an Indian trans actress. Negha Shahin, who created history by becoming the first trans woman to win the debut actor award at the 52nd Kerala State Film Awards. She was born in Tamil Nadu, India.

Negha was forced to leave her home and drop out of college at the age of 18. She is currently living in Chennai and has worked with various transgender rights organizations, including the Thozhi.

Negha's life story was included in the Class 8 Arts textbook of the Kerala State Council of Educational Research and Training (SCERT), making her the first transgender woman from India to be featured in a Kerala school curriculum.

Negha is the founder of Queer Casting and QC is a nonprofit organization dedicated to supporting the trans and queer community.

== Early life ==
Negha was assaulted and then kicked out by her parents when she came out as transgender. She moved to Chennai with her Plus Two certificate.

== Career ==
Negha is a trained mental health counsellor, having worked with a NGO called Thozhi. She has counseled over 100+ trans women to overcome their gender issues and fight against their social stigma. During this, she became a model and a television anchor. She also worked as a video jockey with Ananda Vikatan.

Negha is the writer of Love Is Love. and director of Sandakaranga. “This is the first-time trans men and trans women have come together on a stage,” says Negha in Rural India Online.

In 2021, she appeared in Antharam, for which she was the first transgender woman to win a Maiden Award at the 52nd Kerala State Film Awards.

She has also starred in a few short films namely, Piravi, Manam and Thirunagal. She worked on a Tamil film The Road (2023), which also stars Trisha and Miya George.

== Evolution in media ==
In September 2023, the inaugural QC workshop was successfully completed with participation from over 18 transgender and queer individuals. They gained valuable field knowledge from directors Mysskin and Sasikumar alongside various other directors and actors.

In June 2024, observed worldwide as Pride Month, Queer Casting hosted an event called "Pride Palooza" in Chennai, Tamil Nadu. This event's organized by a trans couple, featured a keynote of first southern trans men panel discussion in India and the 106th performance of A. Revathi's play "Vellai Mozhi," an award ceremony with several other activities.

== Filmography ==
=== As actress ===
List of film acting credits
Year	Title	Role	Language	Notes	Ref.
2023	Antharam	Anjali	Malayalam	Won—Kerala State Film Special Award in Any Category for Women/Transgender	
2023	The Road	Kaaturosa	Tamil	Debut Tamil film	
