= George Joseph K. (writer) =

George joseph K.
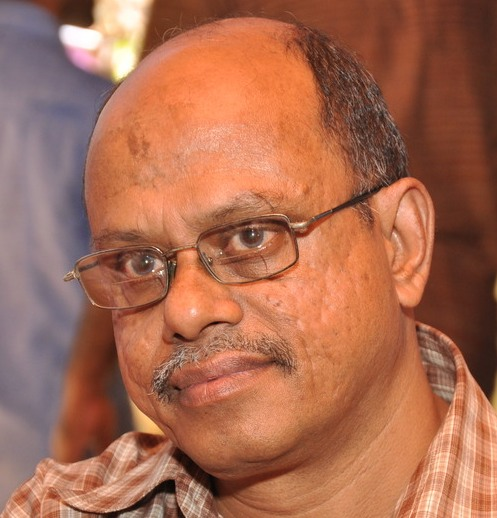
- Born: June 10, 1955 (age 71); Kaloor, Ernakulam district, Kerala, India
- Occupations: Short story writer, Novelist, Poet, Journalist
- Spouse: Lovely
- Children: 2 children
- Writing career
- Notable works: Anantharam Sandhyayayi Ushassayi; Chevittorma; Avan Maranayogyan; Swayamvaram; Nilaavariyunnu; Mariyamma Enna Marimaya; Kunjunni Paranja Yayathi Varalinte Katha; Althara Vilkkanundu; Thiranjedutha Kathakal
- Notable awards: T. P. Kishore Award; K. A. Kodungalloor Award; Lalithanjali Literary Award

George Joseph K. (born June 10, 1955), is an Indian short story writer, novelist, poet and journalist who writes in Malayalam language. He has published 9 books which include Anantharam Sandhyayayi Ushassayi, Chevittorma, Swayamvaram, Nilaavariyunnu, Avan Maranayogyan, Mariyamma Enna Marimaya, Kunjunni Paranja Yayathi Varalinte Katha, Althara Vilkkanundu and Thiranjedutha Kathakal and is a recipient of such awards as T. P. Kishore Award, K. A. Kodungalloor Award and Lalithanjali Literary Award.

== Biography ==
George Joseph K. was born on June 10, 1955, in Kaloor, in Ernakulam district, in the south Indian state of Kerala. He started his career as a journalist by joining Mangalam Publications where he worked for two years before joining Pen Books as the Publication Manager. Subsequently, he joined Janani Online Magazine where he works as a Consultant Editor. In between, he has served in the committees of Sahitya Akademi and Kerala Sahitya Akademi.

George Joseph has written a number of novels, short story anthologies and poems, besides a memoir by name, Mariyamma Enna Marimaya (An Illusion by name Mariyamma) and is now serialising another memoir titled Athmahathyamunanpu (Suicide Point) in Malayala Manorama weekly. DC Books has brought out an anthology of his short stories under the title, Thiranjedutha Kathakal (Selected Stories). His novel, Avan Maranayogyan, has been included in the syllabus of Mahatma Gandhi University.

The first of the literary awards George Joseph received was K. A. Kodungalloor Award, which was followed by T. P. Kishore Award. Lalithambika Antharjanam Sahityavedi awarded their inaugural Lalithanjali Literary Award to George Joseph for his contributions to Malayalam literature. He has also received a Senior Fellowship of the Ministry of Culture by which he did a research on the writings of noted Malayalam writer, Sethu on the topic, The women and soil in Sethu's writings.

George Joseph, who is active in Malayalam literary circles, is married to Lovely and the couple has a son, Appu, and a daughter, Hanna.

== Selected bibliography ==
Title	Year	Publisher	Genre
Chevittorma	1985	Sahitya Pravarthaka Sahakarana Sangam	Novel
Anantharam Sandhyayayi Ushassayi	1990	DC Books	Novel
Avan Maranayogyan	1997	Sahitya Pravarthaka Sahakarana Sangam	Short story anthology
Swayamvaram	2003	DC Books	Novel
Nilaavariyunnu	2006	DC Books	Novel
Mariyamma Enna Marimaya	2011	DC Books	Memoir
Kunjunni Paranja Yayathi Varalinte Katha	2012	DC Books	Short story anthology
Althara Vilkkanundu	2021	Logos Books	Short story anthology
Thiranjedutha Kathakal	2025	DC Books	Short story anthology

== See also ==
- P. F. Mathews
- Thomas Joseph
- Socrates K. Valath
- Ponjikkara Rafi
