= Lalithambika Antharjanam =

Indian writer and reformer (1909–1987)

- Born: 30 March 1909; Kottavattom, Quilon, Kingdom of Travancore, British India (present day Kollam, Kerala, India)
- Died: 6 February 1987 (aged 77); Njaliyakuzhi, Kottayam, Kerala, India
- Occupations: Writer; Social reformer
- Spouse: Narayanan Nambuthiri
- Children: 7 (incl. N. Mohanan)
- Writing career
- Language: Malayalam
- Notable works: Agnisakshi; Atmakathaykku Oru Amukham
- Notable awards: Sahitya Akademi Award; Kerala Sahitya Akademi Award; Vayalar Award; Kerala Sahitya Akademi Fellowship

Lalithambika Antharjanam (30 March 1909 – 6 February 1987) was an Indian author and social reformer best known for her literary works in the Malayalam language. She was influenced by the Indian independence movement and social reform movements among the Nambuthiri community and her writing reflects a sensitivity to the women's role in society, in the family and as an individual.

Her published oeuvre consists of short stories, poems, children's literature, and a novel, Agnisakshi (Fire, My Witness) which won the Kendra Sahitya Akademi Award and Kerala Sahitya Akademi Award in 1977. Her autobiography Atmakathaykku Oru Amukham (An Introduction to Autobiography) is also considered a significant work in Malayalam literature. Her other works include Adyathe Kathakal (First Stories), Takarna Talamura (Ruined Generation), Kilivatililoode (Through the Pigeon Hole), Kodunkattil Ninnu (From a Whirlwind), Moodupadathil (Behind the Veil), Agni Pushpangal (Flowers of Fire) and Sita Mutal Satyavati Vare (From Sita to Satyavati).

== Biography ==
Lalithambika Antharjanam (Note: 'Antharjanam' means 'she who spends her life inside'. Her first name is a compound of 'Lalitha' (Simple,) and 'Ambika' (literally 'little mother', the name of a goddess)) was born on 30 March 1909, at Kottavattom near Punalur, Kollam district, in the south Indian state of Kerala, in a conservative household to Kottavattathu Illathu Damodaran Namboothiri and Changarappilli Manaykkal Aryadevi Antharjanam. She was the first child of her parents, who later had seven sons. She had little formal education, however, her father appointed a private tutor who taught the child, which was unusual at the time.

Although she was part of the most powerful landholding Brahmin caste of Kerala, Lalithambika's life-work was the exposure and destruction of the hypocrisy, violence and injustice with which women were treated in Nambudiri society. She was not allowed to study in school, and could only glean scraps of information about the outside world through male relatives who were kind enough to tell her about current affairs. She knew a little about the ongoing Indian freedom movement, and longed to take part. In 1926, she was married in the prescribed way to the farmer Narayanan Nambudiri. As a wife, she now lost all contact with the outside world and her day consisted of a claustrophobic routine of hard physical labour in smoky kitchens and damp closed courtyards, petty domestic politics and the fears and jealousies of other similarly imprisoned women. But she also saw their courage and their determination to be human in spite of the unnatural conditions of their lives. In this world her only outlet was her writing, which she did in secret. At the end of a working day that began before dawn, she would put her children to sleep, bar the door and write in the light of a tiny lamp. Constant exposure to smoke and inadequate lighting began to destroy her eyes. When the pain got very bad, she would write with her eyes closed. The frustration and degradation of her caste sisters moved Lalithambika to expose their plight in her celebrated Malayalam novel Agnisakshi (Fire being the Witness). The novel was later made into a film with the same title in 1997.

Nambudiri custom allowed only the eldest son to marry within the caste; all the others contracted sambandhams with women from other castes, usually the amabalavasis and nair (except kiriyath nair and some other nair subcastes). This ensured that inheritance through the male line was always undisputed, since the children of sambandhams did not have the right to inherit. As a result, many Nambudiri women remained unmarried all their lives, in restrictions that amounted to rigorous imprisonment. They were not supposed to let the sun's rays touch their bodies. Any slip or shadow of suspicion would condemn them to being tried by the smarthavicharam courts of male elders. These courts were empowered to strip a woman of her social position and throw her out to starve. For these women, who were not even allowed to look out of windows, such a fate was psychologically as well as economically devastating.

On the rare occasions when antharjanams left the house, they had to envelope their whole bodies in a thick cloak, and carry a leaf umbrella whose canopy reached to their waists, so that they could only see their own feet when walking. By contrast, lower caste women were required by law to bare their breasts when in the presence of higher caste men, and could be punished for not doing so. They thus habitually went with their upper bodied uncovered, and many reformist and missionary movements in early twentieth century Kerala clothed lower caste women by force to uplift them. By the 1930s, most royal households (who were below Brahmins, caste-wise) were allowing their women to wear blouses, but the practice took longer to percolate downwards to poorer families, especially as blouses were quite costly.

In her story Revenge Herself (English translation anthologised in The Inner Courtyard), she highlights the moral and sexual choices faced by upper caste Nambudiri women, who were secluded in the inner house, through the story of the "fallen woman" Tatri. This is especially sensitive in Kerala, where other women are relatively free sexual lives in their matriarchal culture. In her story Mulappalinte Manam she highlights the woman's role as the central cohesive force in society, and she supports artificial birth control, so long as it does not contradict this basic womanly qualities of healing the schisms opened up by individualism.

From her marriage with Narayanan Naboothiri, she had three sons, Bhaskara Kumar, N. Mohanan and Rajendran and four daughters, Leela, Shantha, Rajam and Mani. N. Mohanan was also a noted author and a recipient of Kerala Sahitya Akademi Award.

== Legacy ==
Lalithambika Antharjanam Centre is a cultural organization with the mission of preserving the legacy of the author and social reformer as well as to empower women in the arts, within Malayalam literature. The organization has initiated several awards in Malayalam literature and has now instituted an annual award, Lalithanjali Literary Award, George Joseph K. and Ee Sandhya receiving the awards on March 29, 2026, at a function held at Chavara Cultural Centre, Kochi.

== Awards and honours ==
- 1965: Kerala Sahitya Akademi Award for Children's Literature – Gosayi Paranja Katha
- 1973: Kerala Sahitya Akademi Award for Literary Criticism – Sita Mutal Satyavati Vare
- 1977: Sahitya Akademi Award – Agnisakshi
- 1977: Kerala Sahitya Akademi Award for Novel – Agnisakshi
- 1977: Vayalar Award – Agnisakshi
- 1981: Kerala Sahitya Akademi Fellowship

Kerala Sahitya Akademi has renamed its library as Lalithambika Antharjanam Memorial Library in her honor.

== Bibliography ==
=== Poetry ===
- — (1937). Lalitanjali. Kannikode: Lalitodayam. p. 80.
- — (1938). Vanji Rajeswari. Quilon: Sri Rama Vilasom.
- — (1944). Bhavadipti. Kottayam: Vidyarthi Mithram. p. 59.
- — (1958). Oru Pottichiri. Kottayam: S.P.C.S. p. 38.
- — (1959). Nisabda Sangitam. Kottayam: S.P.C.S. p. 56.
- — (1969). Ayirathiri. Kottayam: S.P.C.S. p. 239.

=== Short stories ===
- — (1937). Ambikanjali. Kannikode: Bhaskara Vilasom.
- — (1937). Adyathe Kathakal. Kottayam: S.P.C.S. (2nd edition, 1954). p. 165.
- — (1946). Moodupadathil. Trichur: Mangalodayam. p. 135.
- — (1949). Kalathinte Etukal. Trichur: Mangalodayam. p. 73.
- — (1949). Takarnna Talamura. Kottayam: S.P.C.S. p. 127.
- — (1950). Kilivatililoode. Kottayam: N.B.S. p. 117.
- — (1951). Kodunkattil Ninnu. Kottayam: N.B.S. p. 112.
- — (1955). Kanneerinte Punchiri. Kottayam: S.P.C.S. p. 114.
- — (1956). Irupatu Varshathinu Sesham. Kottayam: S.P.C.S. p. 160.
- — (1956). Vellinaksatram. Trichur: Published by the author. p. 28.
- — (1960). Agni Pushpangal. Kottayam: S.P.C.S. p. 127.
- — (1966). Tiranhedutha Kathakal. Kottayam: S.P.C.S. p. 415.
- — (1968). Marikkatha Pretam. Kottayam: Vidyarthi Mithram. p. 60.
- — (1968). Satyathinte Swaram. Kottayam: S.P.C.S. p. 123.
- — (1971). Viswarupam. Kottayam: S.P.C.S. p. 84.
- — (1973). Dhirendu Majumdarude Amma. Kottayam: S.P.C.S. p. 122.
- — (1975). Stree. Kottayam: N.B.S.
- — (1979). Pavitra Motiram. Kottayam: S.P.C.S. p. 109.
- — (2014). Manikkanum Mattu Pradhana Kathakalum. Kottayam: DC Books. p. 114.

=== Children's literature ===
- — (1951). Gramabalika. Kottayam: N.B.S. p. 71.
- — (1962). Kunjomana. Kottayam: S.P.C.S. p. 35.
- — (1964). Gosayi Paranja Katha. Kottayam: S.P.C.S. p. 32.
- — (1968). Tentullikal. Kottayam: S.P.C.S. p. 31.
- — (2022). Kunjomanayum Mattu Balakathakalum. Kottayam: DC Books. p. 166.
- —. Mrigasalayil. Cochin: Kurukshethra Prakasan.

=== Miscellaneous ===
- — (1972). Sita Mutal Satyavati Vare. Kottayam: N.B.S. p. 153. "Study"
- — (1976). Agnisakshi. Kottayam: S.P.C.S. p. 152. "Novel"
- — (1979). Atmakathaykku Oru Amukham. Kottayam: S.P.C.S. p. 129. "Autobiography"
- — (2011). Viradhatri. Kottayam: S.P.C.S. "Play"
- —. Mayatha Mazhavillu. Calicut: Lipi. "Memoirs/essays"
- —. Sakuntala. Trivandrum: Kerala Bhasha Institute. "Screenplay"

=== Translations ===
English

- — (1980). Fire, My Witness. Translated by Vasanthi Sankaranarayanan. Trichur: Kerala Sahitya Akademi.
- — (1998). Cast Me Out If You Will: Stories and Memoir. Translated by Gita Krishnankutty. Stree. ISBN 978-81-85604-11-4.
- — (2017). On the Far Side of Memory: Short Stories of Lalithambika Antharjanam. Translated by J. Devika. New Delhi: Oxford University Press. ISBN 978-0-19-909153-9.

Other languages

- — (2004). Agg Goah (in Dogri). New Delhi: Sahitya Akademi. ISBN 978-81-260-1741-6.

== See also ==
- Lalithambika Antharjanam Sahitya Award
