= Aavasavyuham =

2022 Indian Malayalam comedy film by Krishand

- Official poster
- Directed by: Krishand
- Written by: Krishand
- Produced by: Krishand
- Starring: Rahul Rajagopal; Sreenath Babu; Sreejith Babu; Zhinz Shan
- Cinematography: Vishnu Prabhakar
- Edited by: Rakesh Cherumadam
- Music by: Ajmal Hasbulla
- Production company: Krishand Films
- Distributed by: SonyLIV
- Release date: 4 August 2022
- Country: India
- Language: Malayalam

Aavasavyuham: The Arbit Documentation of An Amphibian Hunt also more commonly known as Aavasavyuham (transl. Habitat) is a 2022 Indian Malayalam language mockumentary science fiction comedy film written and directed by Krishand. The film stars Rahul Rajagopal, Sreenath Babu, Sreejith Babu, Zhinz Shan in the lead roles, Technical crew for the movie is Chief Associate Director Vysakh Reetha, Editing by Rakesh Cherumadam and Cinematography by Vishnu Prabhakar. The approach used to depict the storyline in the film was inspired from Warren Beatty's directorial Reds and Christopher Nolan's directorial Interstellar. The film was streamed via SonyLIV from 4 August 2022 as a LIV originals opening to positive reviews from critics. The film also won the Kerala State Film Award for Best Film in 2021 and Kerala State Film Award for Best Screenplay in 2021. Film critic Anna M. M. Vetticad ranked it third in her year-end list of best Malayalam films of 2022.

== Cast ==
- Rahul Rajagopal as Joy/Homme Grenouille
- Sreenath Babu as Murali
- Nileen Sandra as Lissy
- Zhinz Shan as Shusheelan Vava
- Nikhil Prabhakar as Plank
- Geethi Sangeetha as Madhusmitha TK
- Sreejith Babu as Kurian Babu

== Production ==
Filmmaker Krishand used social media platforms such as TikTok as one of the popular communication techniques to narrate the plot of the film. The mockumentary element was also used in the film by the filmmaker and Krishand drew inspiration from the comic book character Swamp Thing which featured in the 1954 film Creature from the Black Lagoon, and werewolf stories. The final chapter of the film was inspired by Franz Kafka’s The Metamorphosis as well as the Gabriel García Márquez's A Very Old Man with Enormous Wings.

== Awards and nominations ==
List of awards and nominations
Year	Award	Category	Work	Result	Ref.
2022	26th International Film Festival of Kerala (IFFK 2021)	FIPRESCI Award for Best Malayalam film	–	Won	
2022	26th International Film Festival of Kerala (IFFK 2021)	NETPAC Award for Best Malayalam film	–	Won	
2022	52nd Kerala State Film Awards	Best Film	–	Won	
2022	52nd Kerala State Film Awards	Best Screenplay (Original)	–	Won	
2022	13th J. C. Foundation Award	Best film	–	Won	
2022	29th Padmarajan Awards	Best Director	Krishand RK / – (Note: shared with Sidhartha Siva / Aanu)	Won	
2022	29th Padmarajan Awards	Best Screenplay	Krishand RK / –	Won	
2022	45th Kerala Film Critics Association Awards	Best Film	–	Won	
