= Perumazhakkalam =

- Theatrical film poster
- Directed by: Kamal
- Written by: T. A. Razzaq
- Produced by: Salim Padiyath
- Starring: Dileep; Meera Jasmine; Vineeth; Kavya Madhavan; Biju Menon
- Cinematography: P. Sukumar
- Edited by: K. Rajagopal
- Music by: M. Jayachandran
- Production company: Rasikar Films
- Distributed by: Valiyaveettil Movies
- Release date: 12 November 2004
- Country: India
- Language: Malayalam

Perumazhakkalam (transl. The season of downpour) is a 2004 Indian Malayalam-language drama film directed by Kamal and written by T. A. Razzaq. It stars Dileep, Meera Jasmine, Kavya Madhavan, Vineeth and Biju Menon. The film's music was composed by M. Jayachandran. The film was produced by Salim Padiyath through Rasikar Films and distributed by Valiyaveettil Movies.

The film won five Kerala State Film Awards and the National Film Award for Best Film on Other Social Issues. Perumazhakkalam was released on 12 November 2004, coinciding with Diwali. The film was remade in Hindi in 2006 as Dor by Nagesh Kukunoor.

== Plot ==
Akbar is happily married to Raziya. He goes to Saudi Arabia for employment and meets Raghu Rama Iyer and John Kuruvilla. The three become good friends. Akbar loans some money to another Indian named Haneefa, who is working with them. Haneefa absconds with the money, and all efforts to get back the money go in vain. During a fight with Haneefa, Akbar hits him but misses and accidentally kills Raghu. He is now given the death penalty by a Saudi court. The only way for him to escape the penalty is to obtain a letter from Raghu's wife, Ganga, that she pardons him.

Raziya and her father, Abdu, travel to Palakkad to meet Ganga to plead for mercy and obtain the letter from her. They stay in Abdu's old friend Kunjikannan's house. Ganga's in-laws refuse to let her meet Ganga but Raziya persists. She finally meets Ganga when the latter is visiting the temple, but Ganga refuses to meet her and leaves the scene. Raziya is finally thrown out from the community compound by Raghu's relatives.

Ganga finally realizes that she must pardon Akbar. However, Raziya has left for her home by then. Realizing that pardoning Akbar could lead to ostracisation by her community, Ganga travels to Raziya's hometown and meets her, signs the letter of pardon. When she returns home, she is thrown out by her in-laws and the community.

Akbar returns after serving a three-year sentence and the family visits Ganga who now sells snacks for a living. The children of the families bond with each other oblivious to the relationship between their parents.

== Cast ==
- Dileep as Akbar, Raziya's husband
- Vineeth as Raghu Rama Iyer, Ganga's husband
- Biju Menon as John Kuruvila
- Meera Jasmine as Raziya
- Kavya Madhavan as Ganga
- Mamukkoya as Abdu
- Sadiq as Najeeb
- Salim Kumar as Aamu Elappa
- Kalasala Babu as Krishna Iyer
- Yadu Krishnan as Sethu
- Mala Aravindan as Kunjikkannan
- Babu Namboothiri as Mani Swamy
- Shivaji as Vishnu
- Valsala Menon as Paatty
- Ramya Nambeeshan as Neelima
- Ramu as M. L. A. Salim Thangal
- Vijeesh as TV Anchor Chandradas
- Bindu Ramakrishnan

== Awards and nominations ==
National Film Award

- National Film Award for Best Film on Other Social Issues

Kerala State Film Award

- Best Actress: Kavya Madhavan
- Best Story : T. A. Razzaq
- Kerala State Film Award for Best Music Director: M. Jayachandran
- Kerala State Film Award for Best Sound Recordist : N. Harikumar
- Special Mention : Mamukkoya

Filmfare Awards South

- Filmfare Award for Best Music Director – Malayalam : M. Jayachandran

Asianet Film Awards

- Best Director: Kamal
- Best Actress : Meera Jasmine
- Best Screenplay: T A Razak
- Best Music Director M Jayachandran
- Best Male Playback Singer: M Jayachandran
- Special Jury Award: Kavya Madhavan

It was screened at the competition section of International Film Festival of Kerala.

== Soundtrack ==
Perumazhakkalam

Soundtrack album by M. Jayachandran
- Released: 11 November 2004
- Recorded: 2004
- Studios: Krishna DigiDesign, Chennai
- Genre: Feature film soundtrack
- Language: Malayalam
- Label: Satyam Audios
- Producer: M. Jayachandran

All songs were composed by M. Jayachandran, with lyrics written by Kaithapram and Rafeeque Ahammed.

Track	Song	Artist(s)	Lyrics	Raga(s)
1	"Meharuba"	Afsal, Jyotsna Radhakrishnan	Kaithapram Damodaran Namboothiri	Kapi, Patdeep
2	"Chentharmizhi"	Madhu Balakrishnan, K. S. Chithra, Sharada Kalyanasundaram	Kaithapram Damodaran Namboothiri	Shahana
3	"Kallayi Kadavathe"	P. Jayachandran, Sujatha Mohan	Kaithapram Damodaran Namboothiri	Pahadi
4	"Rakkilithan"	M. Jayachandran, Ustad Faiyaz Khan	Rafeeq Ahamed	Ahir Bhairav
5	"Aalolam"	K. S. Chithra	Kaithapram Damodaran Namboothiri	Neelambari
6	"Meharuba"	Afsal	Kaithapram Damodaran Namboothiri	Kapi, Patdeep
7	"Rakkilithan"	Sujatha Mohan, Ustad Faiyaz Khan	Rafeeq Ahamed	Ahir Bhairav

== Reception ==
Shobha Warrier of Rediff wrote, "It is an emotional film, and very sensitively made. For Kamal, who had been making blockbusters for the last few years, this is an important film as a filmmaker."
