= Antharam =

- Directed by: P. Abhijith
- Screenplay by: Shanavas M. A
- Story by: P. Abhijith
- Produced by: Jojo John Joseph; Paul Kollanoor; Jomin V. Geo; Renuka Ayyappan; A Shobhila
- Starring: Negha Shahin; Kannan Nayar; Nakshathra Manoj
- Cinematography: Mohamed A
- Edited by: Amaljith
- Music by: Rajesh Vijay; Paris V Chandran (BGM)
- Release dates: June 2022 (KASHISH); April 24, 2023
- Country: India
- Language: Malayalam

Antharam is a 2022 Indian Malayalam language film directed by P. Abhijith. The Film is about the inner conflicts, warmth, trauma and joyous moments in the lives of a trans woman, a teenage girl and a man living under the same roof.

Negha Shahin has become the first trans woman to have won the Kerala State Film Award in the category Woman/Transgender. Antharam was the Inaugural Film in the KASHISH Mumbai International Queer Film Festival 2022.

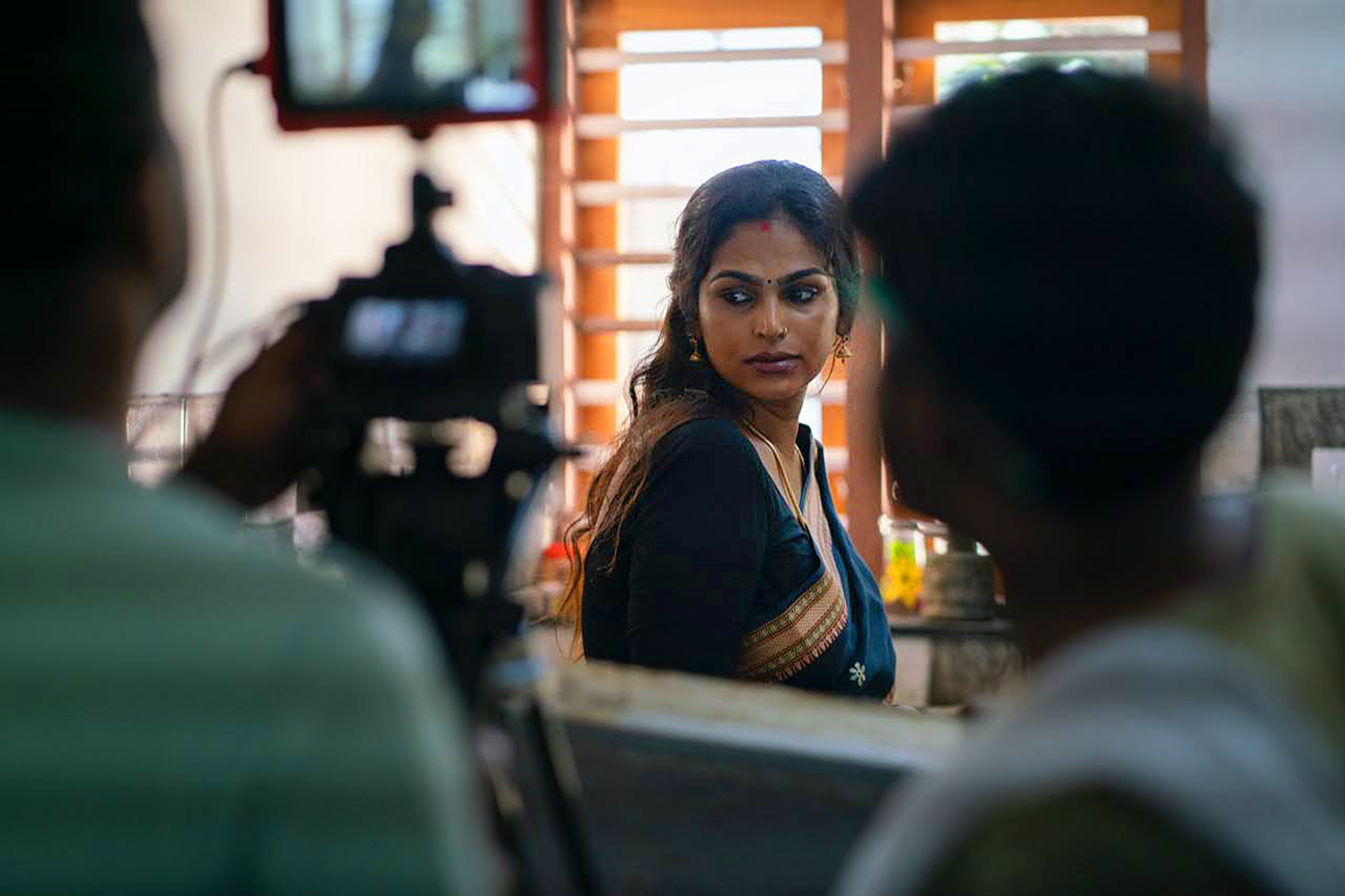
Negha Shahin in 'Antharam' movie

== Plot ==
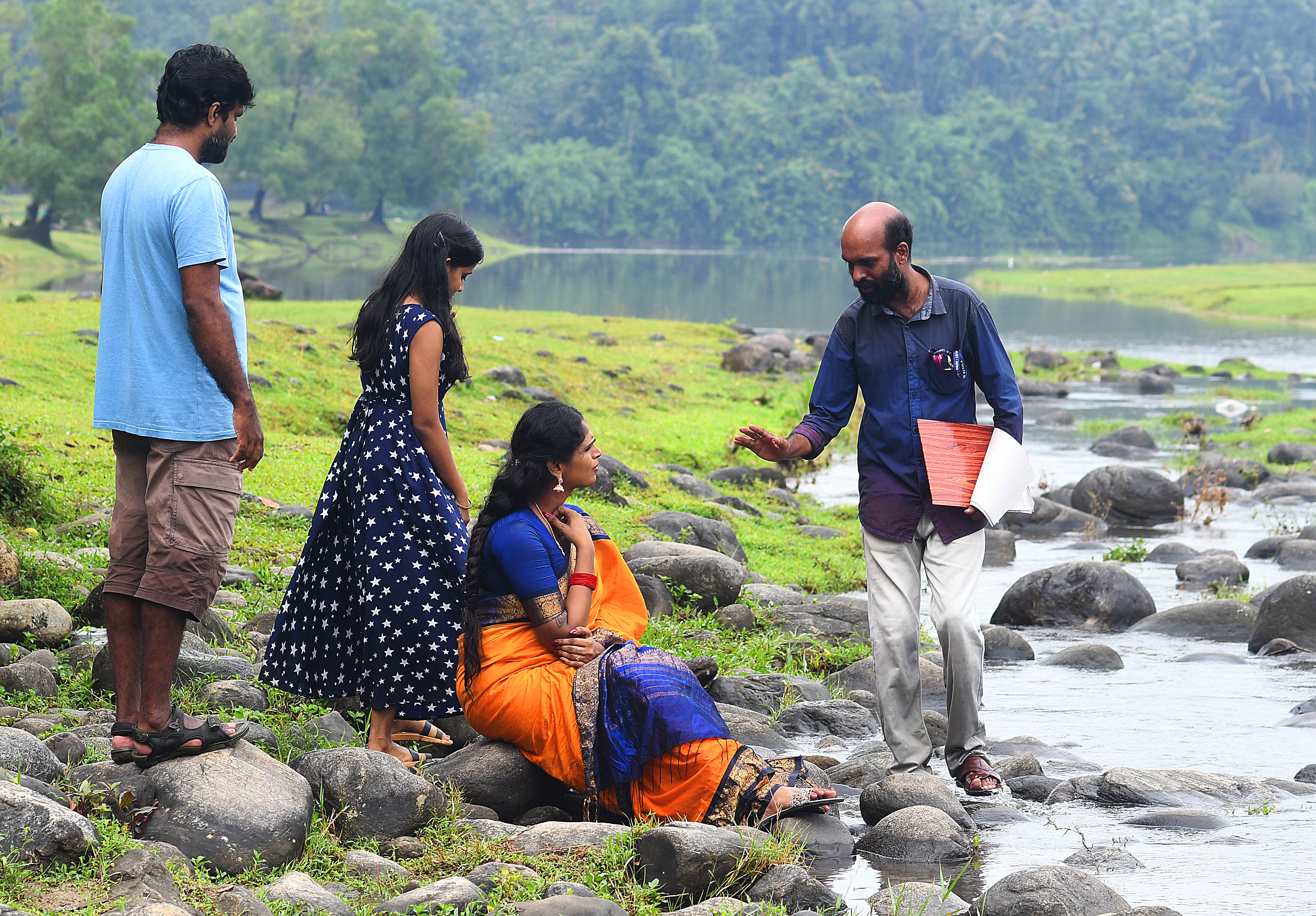
Director Abhijith on the location of 'Antharam'

'Sneha' is going to live with her father 'Hareendran', who is a progressive minded book shop owner. Her mind is filled with uncertainty as she leaves her lovable grandparents. She is relocating to live with her step-mom, Anjali, about whom she is totally unaware of. Sneha keeps a distance from Anjali and tries to be emotionally independent. But the changes in Hareendran torment her and she wishes for a support. Anjali, a trans woman, extends her love and care for Sneha. Sneha understands more about Anjali and becomes in awe of the life the latter has been leading. The film focus on the plight of a trans woman who had to live as a wife of an ordinary man. 'Antharam' deals with the inner conflicts, warmth, trauma and joyous moments in the lives of a Trans woman, a Teenage girl and a Man living under the same roof.

== Cast ==
- Negha Shahin as Anjali
- Kannan Nayar as Hareendran
- Nakshathra Manoj as Sneha
- Rajeevan Vellur as Aravindan
- Revathi Aas Revathi Amma
- Vihaan Peethambar as Vihaan
- Elsy Sukumaran as Grand Mother
- Gireesh Perincheri as Grand Father
- Jomin V Geo as Cleetus
- Muneer Khan as Rajeevan
- Kavya as Kavya Amma
- Deeparani as Deepa
- Laya Maria Jaison as Laya
- Ziya Paval as Ziya
- Pooja as Pooja
- Babu Elavumthitta as Driver Divakaran

== Music ==
No.	Title	Lyrics	Music	Singer(s)	Length
1.	"Koodilla Koottil"	Ajeesh Dasan	Rajesh Vijay	Sithara Krishnakumar	4:01
Total length:					4:01

== Release ==
Antharam was released on manoramaMAX OTT on November 15, 2025.

== Awards ==
Negha Shahin won the Government of Kerala's special award for Women and Transgender Films in 2022 for her performance in the film.

== Participation ==
- Kashish Mumbai International Queer Film Festival 2022
- Bangalore Queer Film Festival 2022
- International Film Festival of Thrissur (IFFT) 2022
- Jaipur International Film Festival 2022
