= Kerala State Film Award for Best Makeup Artist =

Annual Indian film award

The Kerala State Film Award for Best Makeup Artist is presented annually at the Kerala State Film Awards of India.

== Winners ==
Year	Recipient	Films	Ref.
1992	Pattanam Rasheed	Aadharam	
1993	P. N. Mani	Manichitrathazhu	
1994	P. N. Mani	Manathe Vellitheru	
1995	K. V. V. Bose	Sakshyam	
1997	Pattanam Rasheed	Guru	
1998	Vikram Geikwad, P. Mani	Agnisakshi	
1999	M. O. Devasya, Saleem	Vaanaprastham	
2000	S. Gopalakrishnan		
2001	Pandyan	Madhuranombarakattu	
2002	Pattanam Rasheed	Kunjikoonan	
2003	Salim Kadakkal, Saji Kattakkada	Gourisankaram	
2004	Ranjith Ambady	Makalkku	
2005	Pattanam Rasheed	Anandabhadram	
2006	Pattanam Sha	Pulijanmam	
2007	Michael Litman		
2008	Ranjith Ambady	Thirakkatha	
2009	Ranjith Ambady, S. George	Paleri Manikyam Oru Pathirakolapathakathinte Katha	
2010	Pattanam Rasheed	Yugapurushan	
2011	Sudevan	Vellaripravinte Changathi	
2012	M.G. Roshan	Mayamohini	
2013	Pattanam Rasheed	Swapaanam	
2014	Manoj Angamali	Iyobinte Pusthakam	
2015	Rajesh Nermara	Nirnnayakam	
2016	N.G. Roshan	Naval Enna Jewel	
2017	Ranjith Ambady	Take Off	
2018	Ronex Xavier	Njan Marykutty	
2019	Ranjith Ambady	Helen	
2020	Rasheed Ahamed	Article 21	
2021	Ranjith Ambady	Aarkkariyam	
2022	Ronex Xavier	Bheeshma Parvam	
2023	Ranjith Ambady	Aadujeevitham	
2024	Ronex Xavier	Bramayugam, Bougainvillea	
