= K. Gopinathan =

Indian film director

K. Gopinathan ഡോ: കെ ഗോപിനാഥൻ
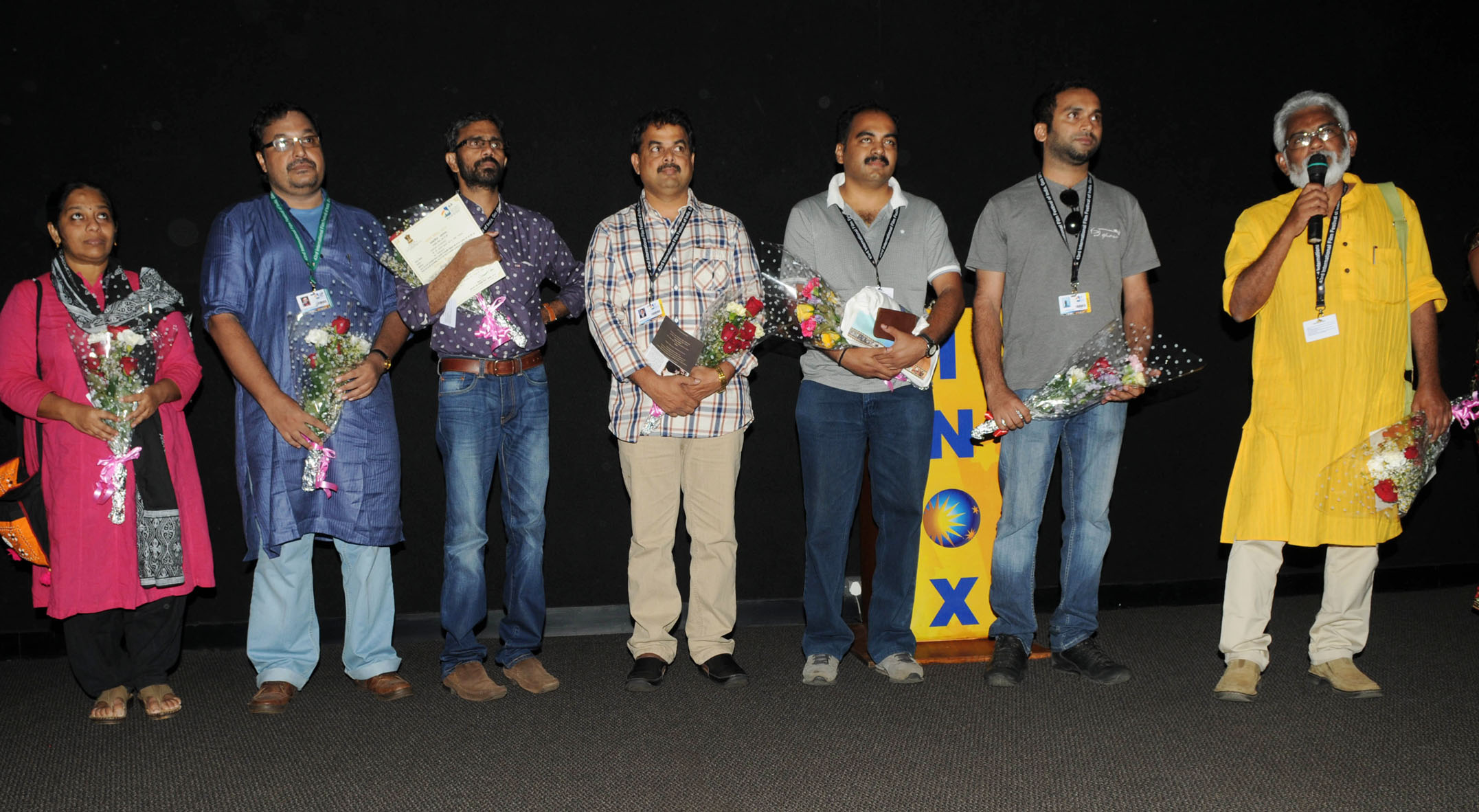
- Gopinathan at IFFI 2012
- Born: Viyyur, Thrissur District, Kerala, India
- Occupations: Philosophy professor, film Maker, film Critic
- Spouse: Janaky Sreedharan
- Children: 1
- Father: A. Achutha Menon

Kunnath Gopinathan is an Indian film maker and film critic from Trichur.

== Career ==
K. Gopinathan started working as a Writer while being a student at JNU during the late eighties. His documentaries include "Mundassery: Kalaghattathinte Muzhakkam", "Swaathanthrya Sangeethika -Freedom Songs", "Maythil – 2010 docu-fiction on writer Maythil Radhakrishnan. His feature films include Ithramaathram, an adaptation of the novel by same name by Kalpetta Narayanan

== Early life ==
During graduation studies in Sree Kerala Varma college, Thrissur and after he was actively involved in student politics, left political movement, film society movement, new literary and theatre movements. Close friendship and associations during this period with directors such as Pavithran, Chintha Ravi, John Abraham; film and theatre activists such as Suresh Pattali and Jose chiramal and participation in theatre and Film appreciation courses in school of drama and Film and Television Institute of India respectively consolidated his interest in arts and literature, especially in cinema.

== Filmography ==
=== Documentaries ===
- 1997 Mundassery: Kalaghattathinte Muzhakkam
- 1999 Swaathanthrya Sangeethika (Freedom Songs — Three musical episodes)
- 2010 Maythil — docu-fiction on writer Maythil Radhakrishnan

=== Feature film ===
- 2012 Ithramathram (2012 film) (adaptation of the novel by same name by Kalpetta Narayanan)
- 2017 Samarppanam

== As writer ==
- 1996 Book on Feminist Soundarya Sasthram (Feminist Aesthetics) Trans: with Dr. Janaky, Published by Book Worm
- 1998 EMS: Vaakkum Samoohavum (ed.) (EMS: Word & Society) Current Books, Thrissur
- 2003 Film & Philosophy (Edited- English) Published by University of Calicut
- 2005 Cinemayum Samskaravum (film & Culture) Current Books, Thrissur
- 2005 Tarkovsky: Uravidangalilekku Veendum (Tarkovsky: To the Sources Again) Sign Books, Trivandrum
- 2008 Pratheekangal Parayunnathu (What Images Speak) Poorna Publication, Calicut
- 2012 Cinemayude Nottangal (Looks of Cinema) Mathrubhumi Books, Calicut
- Apart from these books, several articles on film and culture have appeared in many anthologies and journals in English and Malayalam

== Awards ==
- International Film Critics Federation FIPRESCI Award for the best Malayalam film, ITHRAMATHRAM (2012 (17th IFFK) and Entry in Indian Panorama International Film Festival of India 2012
