= A. Revathi =

Indian writer and LGBTQ rights activist

A Revathi is a Bangalore-based writer and activist working for LGBT rights in India. She is a trans woman and member of the Hijra community.

== Personal life ==
Revathi was born as Doraiswamy in Namakkal district in the Indian state of Tamil Nadu, and was assigned a male gender based on physiology. As a child, Revathi experienced violence in her school and within her family for her "feminine" ways. She preferred playing with young girls over boys and dressed up as a woman in her mother's clothes, distressed by the feeling of being a female trapped in a male body. Her personal and social hardships affected her academic performance, and she had to drop out of school as a result, having failed the tenth grade. However, when she first met a group of people from the kothi community during a school trip to Nammakal, she felt a sense of kinship and decided to run away to Delhi with them so that she could be true to her gender identity.

In Delhi, she met a group of people belonging to the Hijra community and began living with them. She later underwent a sex-change operation, which was considered a rite of passage to get formally initiated into the hijra household. After her operation, she was rechristened as Revathi by the guru or head of the household. Though she could finally be true to her gender identity, Revathi discovered the harsh realities of life as a hijra, where social exclusion, violence and sexual assault were all too common. She had to resort to several odd jobs to survive including dancing at weddings, begging and sex work. After some months, tired of her life in Delhi, she ran away and went back home, where she discovered she was not welcome.

She subsequently left her home in Tamil Nadu and moved to Bangalore for work. While she initially took to sex work, she finally got a job at Sangama, an NGO working for the rights of sexual minorities. Here, she was exposed to activist meetings and learnt more about her rights. While she started off as a peon in the organisation, she rose in the ranks and finally ended up as the director. Two sources mention a brief marriage with a coworker at Sangama. She works now as a transgender-rights activist based in Bangalore.

== Her literary work and other achievements ==
Revathi published her first book in Tamil, Unarvum Uruvamum (Our Lives, Our Words), in 2004. It is a collection of real life stories of the people belonging to the Hijra community in South India. She credits the book with inspiring other hijra writers to publish their own books, such as Priya Babu's Naan Sarvanan Alla (2007) and Vidya's I am Vidya (2008).

Following this, she decided to write about her own experiences. She published her second book, The Truth about Me: A Hijra Life Story, in 2010. The book was written in Tamil and translated into English by feminist historian V. Geetha. According to Revathi, she initially released the book in English and not Tamil to avoid conflict with her family, who featured in her book and did not speak English. The book was eventually published in Tamil as Vellai Mozhi in 2011. She cites a very prominent Tamil Dalit writer Bama as one of her main inspirations.

The American College in Madurai has included The Truth about me: A Hijra Life story as a part of its third gender literature syllabus. In 2019, her name was put up at Butler Library in Columbia University, along with names like Maya Angelou and Toni Morrison and remained there throughout the fall semester.

== Film career ==
Revathi made her acting debut in the 2008 Tamil film Thenavattu. In 2022, she appeared in the Malayalam movie Antharam, which starred Negha, a transgender actress from Tamil Nadu.

In 2025, P. Abhijith's documentary I Am Revathi features A. Revathi sharing her life story and was first screened at the 17th International Documentary and Short Film Festival of Kerala (IDSFFK).
