= Pattanam Rasheed =

Indian make-up artist

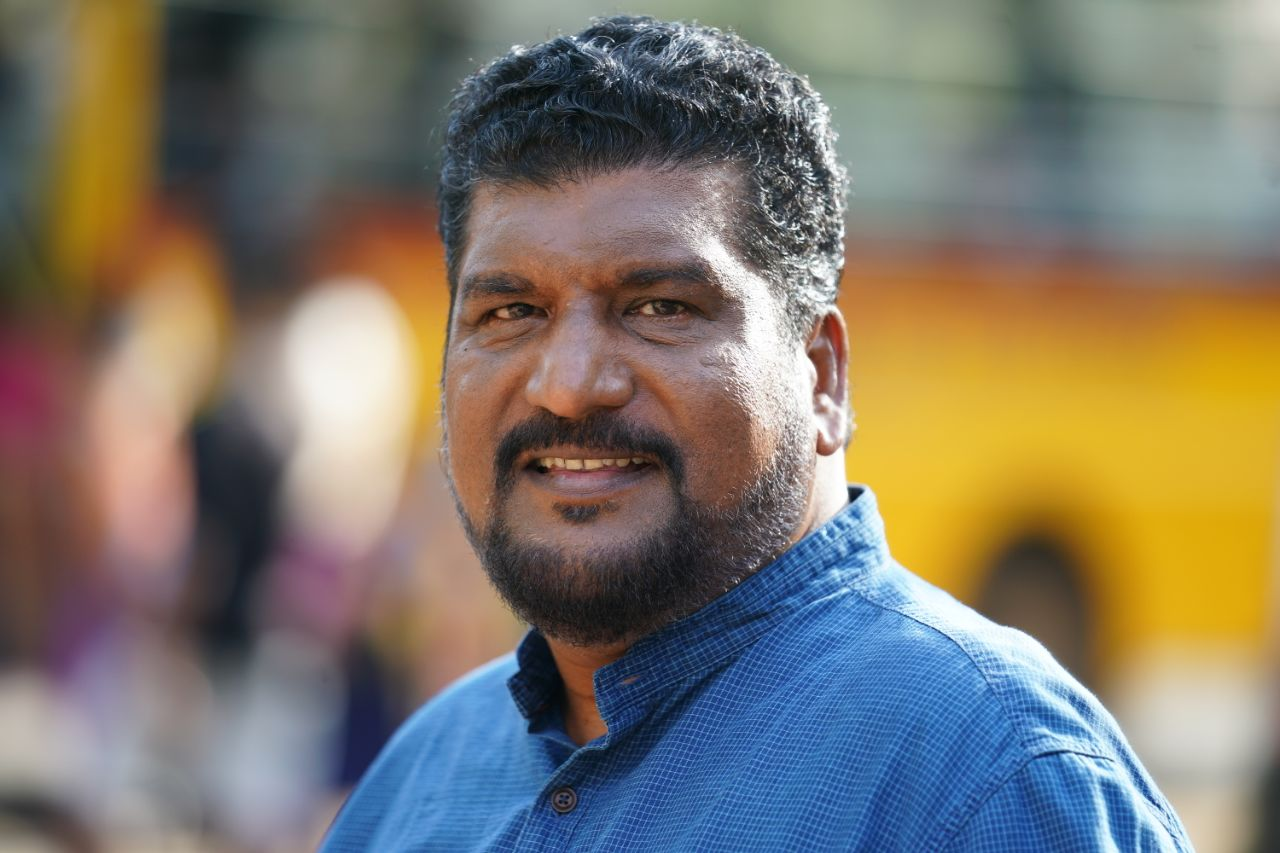

Pattanam Rasheed is an Indian make-up artist, who has worked predominantly, but not exclusively, in Malayalam cinema. He won the 55th National Film Award for Best Make-up Artist.

== Awards ==
Kerala State Film Awards

- 1992 Kerala State Film Award for Best Makeup Artist - Aadhaaram
- 1997 Kerala State Film Award for Best Makeup Artist - Guru
- 2002 Kerala State Film Award for Best Makeup Artist - Kunjikoonan
- 2005 Kerala State Film Award for Best Makeup Artist - Anandabhadram
- 2010 Kerala State Film Award for Best Makeup Artist - Yugapurushan
- 2013 Kerala State Film Award for Best Makeup Artist - Swapaanam

Other awards

- 2012 Kerala Sangeetha Nataka Akademi Award
