= Anantaram =

1987 film

- Poster designed by Gayathri Ashokan
- Directed by: Adoor Gopalakrishnan
- Written by: Adoor Gopalakrishnan
- Produced by: K. Ravindran Nair
- Starring: Mammootty; Ashokan; Shobana
- Cinematography: Mankada Ravi Varma
- Edited by: M. Mani
- Music by: M. B. Sreenivasan
- Production company: General Pictures
- Release date: 21 October 1987
- Running time: 125 minutes
- Country: India
- Language: Malayalam

Anantaram (Malayalam: അനന്തരം, transl. Thereafter), also known as Monologue, is a 1987 Indian Malayalam-language psychological drama film written and directed by Adoor Gopalakrishnan. It stars Ashokan, Mammootty and Shobana in the lead. The film is structured like a monologue. It develops through a commentary by the protagonist about himself in the first person. The attempt of the protagonist is to narrate how his ignored mental health deterioration or "psychosis, not otherwise specified" has led him where he is now. The film was an experimental film for its time as it did not have a linear narrative.

The film won the 1987 FIPRESCI Prize at the Karlovy Vary International Film Festival and three National Film Awards- for Best Director, Best Screenplay and Best Audiography. It was included in an online poll by IBN Live listing 100 greatest Indian films of all time.

The film was released on October 21, Diwali day.

== Synopsis ==
Ajayan (Ashokan), an introvert raised by a doctor after being abandoned, narrates his life story in three parts.

Part I: Ajayan grows up an intelligent and socially distant loner at school and college. He develops an intense, obsessive attraction to Suma (Shobana), the wife of his foster brother Balu (Mammootty). This forbidden attraction leads to internal mental conflict.

Part II: Ajayan restarts his story at an even earlier part of his childhood, this time focusing on his friendships with Balu and the servants in the doctor's house, certain childhood terrors, and his love for a different girl, Nalini (also played by Shobana). This part of the narrative is less brooding and more disjointed.

Part III: Both stories with different details begin to converge and merge at the end, leading to a state of mental breakdown where the two women (Suma and Nalini) become a single entity in his mind.

Ultimately it is a journey through the fragmented memories, loneliness, and neurosis or psychosis of its protagonist, Ajayan, the evidently unreliable narrator.

== Cast ==
- Ashokan as Ajayan
- Mammootty as Dr. Balu
- Shobhana as Sumangali and Nalini
- Sudheesh as Young Ajayan
- Bahadoor as Driver Mathai
- Vembayam Thambi as Raman Nair
- Azeez as the gambler
- Cuckoo Parameswaran as nurse
- Krishnankutty Nair as the ailing patient at the dispensary
- Kaviyoor Ponnamma as Yogini Amma
- Adoor Pankajam as Lakshmi Amma

== Critical reception ==
The film upon release got mixed reviews from critics and the general consensus was that the film didn't meet the expectations of an Adoor Gopalakrishnan film. However, modern reception is more positive. The film is now considered way ahead of its time. It is regarded by critics to be one of Adoor Gopalakrishnan's best works. Simran Bhargava of India Today wrote "The story is not complete. Perhaps it is not meant to be. Adoor makes no statement, which story is real, how much is Ajayan's experience and how much he has invested from the world of his imagination. The Nalini of Ajayan's second story could be a dream, but again, she need not. Adoor doesn't insult his audience by laying it out straight. He prods them to bring their own experience to his films. He is not an easy director to understand. But, then, he is not for everyone. He exists so that lesser filmmakers can learn how to make better films."

== Awards ==
The film has been nominated for and won the following awards since its release:

- FIPRESCI Prize (Karlovy Vary International Film Festival)
- Best Director - Adoor Gopalakrishnan
- Best Screenplay - Adoor Gopalakrishnan
- Best Audiography - P. Devadas, T. Krishnanunni, N. Harikumar
