= Agnisakshi (novel) =

Novel by Lalithambika Antharjanam

- Author: Lalithambika Antharjanam
- Original title: അഗ്നിസാക്ഷി
- Translator: Vasanthi Sankaranarayanan
- Language: Malayalam
- Genre: Novel
- Publisher: Current Books
- Publication date: 1976
- Publication place: India
- English publication date: 1980
- Pages: 111
- Awards: Kendra Sahitya Akademi Award; Kerala Sahitya Akademi Award; Vayalar Award; Odakkuzhal Award

Agnisakshi (meaning, With Fire As Witness) is a Malayalam novel written by Lalithambika Antharjanam. Originally serialised in Mathrubhumi Illustrated Weekly, it was published as a book by Current Books in 1976. It tells the story of a Nambudiri woman, who is drawn into the struggle for social and political emancipation but cannot easily shake off the chains of tradition that bind her. The novel was concerned with implied criticism of aspects of social structure and behaviour.

Agnisakshi was Lalithambika Antarjanam's only novel. She was famous for her short stories and poems. She wrote this novel in her old age. It has become something of a classic in Malayalam fiction. It received the Kendra Sahitya Akademi Award and Kerala Sahitya Akademi Award.

== Plot summary ==
Thethikutty (Devaki or Sumitarananda) is married to Unni Nambudiri of the well-known Brahmin family named Manampilly Illam. He is young, virtuous, and loving but too orthodox to be the husband of a woman with Thethikutty's views. Feeling frustrated, Thethikutty leaves him once and forever and reaches her paternal home. Unni lives the life of a piety, is branded as an eccentric and dies. Thethikutty, meanwhile, finds no peace anywhere.

At last, in the Himalayas, she meets her old friend and Unni's half-sister, the sixty-year-old Mrs. K. M. K. Nair (Thankam). She finds her unborn son in Mrs. Nair's son and hands over her wedding pendant to her daughter with the request to cherish it with due regard.

== Themes ==
In the novel, the author explores the ideas of choice, detachment, renunciation, love and devotion through three of her main characters - two women Thethikutty (Sumitarananda, Devaki Manampilli or Devi Bahen), Thankam Nair and one man Unni Nambudiri.

== Awards ==
- 1977: Kendra Sahitya Akademi Award
- 1977: Kerala Sahitya Akademi Award
- 1977: Odakkuzhal Award
- 1977: Vayalar Award

== Translation ==
After reading the serialised story published in Mathrubhumi Illustrated Weekly, translator and art critic Vasanthi Sankaranarayanan got permission from Lalithambika Antharjanam to translate it. The English translation, titled Agnisakshi itself, was published in 1980 by the Kerala Sahitya Akademi.

Agnisakshi. Translated into Hindi by Sudhanshu Chaturvedi. New Delhi: Sahitya Akademi.

== Film adaptation ==
In 1999, a film adaptation of the novel was released, starring Rajit Kapur as Unni Nambudiri, Shobana as Devaki and Praveena as Thankam. The film was scripted and directed by Shyamaprasad. It won a National Film Award and eight Kerala State Film Awards. The film was however criticised for glorifying spiritualism and Hindutva.
