= Krishna Kumari (politician) =

Member of Parliament, Rajya Sabha
- In office 1954–1960
- Constituency: Madhya Pradesh

Personal details
- Born: 6 March 1908
- Party: Indian National Congress

Krishna Kumari was an Indian politician . She was a Member of Parliament, representing Madhya Pradesh in the Rajya Sabha the upper house of India's Parliament as a member of the Indian National Congress.
