= Kerala State Film Award for Best Sound Recordist =

Annual Indian film award

The Kerala State Film Award for Best Sound Recordist is an award presented annually at the Kerala State Film Awards of India to recognize the best sound recordist in Malayalam cinema in the year under review. The winners in the category are:

Year	Recipient(s)	Film	Ref
1979	P. Devadas		
1980	Viswanathan	Lorry, Orikkalkoodi, Oppol, Kolangal	
1981	P. Devadas	Elippathayam, Pokkuveyil	
1982	P. Devadas	Different films	
1983	-	-	
1984	P. Devadas	Mukhamukham	
1985	P. Devadas		
1986	Selvaraj	Onnu Muthal Poojyam Vare	
1987	T. Krishnanunni	Purushartham	
1988	P. Devadas	padippura, Asthikal Pookkunnu	
1989	T. Krishnamoorthy		
1990	P. Devadas	Vembanadu	
1991	Deepan Chettarjee	Abhimanyu	
1992	Arun K. Bose	Yoddha	
1993	Arun K. Bose	Ponthan Mada	
1994	T.Krishnanunni	Swam	
1995	T.Krishnanunni	Kazhakam, Ormakalundayirikkanam	
1996	T.Krishnanunni	Desadanam	
1997	T.Krishnanunni	Janmadinam	
1998	T.Krishnanunni, Irshad Hussain	Agnisakshi	
1999	Lakshmy Narayana, Bruno Tareere	Vaanaprastham	
2000	N. Harikumar	Mazha	
2001	Simon Selvaraj	Sesham	
2002	N. Harikumar	Nizhalkuthu	
2003	N. Harikumar	Margam	
2004	N. Harikumar	Perumazhakkalam	
2005	Ajith A. George	Athbhutha Dweepu	
2006	N. Harikumar	Drishtantham	
2007	T._Krishnanunni	Ottakkayyan	
2008	T._Krishnanunni, N. Harikumar	Oru Pennum Randaanum	
2009	N. Harikumar	Patham Nilayile Theevandi	
2010	Shubdeep Sen Guptha	Chitrasutram	
2011	M. R. Rajakrishnan	Urumi, Chaappa Kurish	
2012	M. R. Rajakrishnan	Manjadikuru	
2013	Harikumar Madhavan Nair (Location sound)	Kanyaka Talkies	
2013	Rajeevan Ayyappan (Sound design)	Kanyaka Talkies	
2013	N. Harikumar (Sound mixing)	Kanyaka Talkies	
2014	Sandeep Kurissery, Jijimon Joseph (Location Sound)	Oraalppokkam	
2014	Tapas Nayak (Sound design)	Iyobinte Pusthakam	
2014	N. Harikumar (Sound mixing)	Various films	
2015	Sandeep Kurissery, Jijimon Joseph (Location Sound)	Ozhivu Divasathe Kali	
2015	Renganaath Ravee (Sound Design)	Ennu Ninte Moideen	
2015	M. R. Rajakrishnan (Sound Mixing)	Charlie	
2016	Jayadevan Chakkadath (Location/Live Sound)	Kaadu Pookkunna Neram	
2016	Jayadevan Chakkadath (Sound Design)	Kaadu Pookkunna Neram	
2016	Pramod Thomas (Sound Mixing)	Kaadu Pookkunna Neram	
2017	Smijith Kumar P. B. (Sync Sound)	Rakshadhikari Baiju Oppu	
2017	Renganaath Ravee (Sound Design)	Ee.Ma.Yau	
2017	Pramod Thomas (Sound Mixing)	Aedan	
2018	Anil Radhakrishnan (Sync Sound)	Carbon	
2018	Jayadevan Chakkadath (Sound Design)	Carbon	
2018	Sinoy Joseph (Sound Mixing)	Carbon	
2019	Harikumar Madhavan Nair (Sync Sound)	Nani	
2019	Sreesankar Gopinath, Vishnu Govind (Sound Design)	Unda, Ishq	
2019	Kannan Ganpat (Sound Mixing)	Jallikattu	
2020	Adarsh Joseph Cherian (Sync Sound)	Santhoshathinte Onnam Rahasyam	
2020	Tony Babu (Sound Design)	The Great Indian Kitchen	
2020	Ajith A. George (Sound Mixing)	Sufiyum Sujatayum	
2021	Arun Asok, Sonu K.P (Sync Sound)	Chavittu	
2021	Renganaath Ravee (Sound Design)	Churuli	
2021	Justin Jose (Sound Mixing)	Minnal Murali	
2022	Vaishak P. V. (Sync Sound)	Ariyippu	
2022	Ajayan Adat (Sound Design)	Ela Veezha Poonchira	
2022	Vipin Nair (Sound Mixing)	Nna Thaan Case Kodu	
2023	Shameer Ahamed (Sync Sound)	O.Baby	
2023	Jayadevan Chakkadath, Anil Radhakrishnan (Sound Design)	Ullozhukku	
2023	Resul Pookutty, Sarath Mohan (Sound Mixing)	Aadujeevitham	
2024	Ajayan Adat (Sync Sound)	Pani	
2024	Shijin Melvin, Abhishek Nair (Sound Design)	Manjummel Boys	
2024	Fasal A Bhakkar, Shijin Melvin (Sound Mixing)	Manjummel Boys	
