= Nizhalkuthu =

2002 film by Adoor Gopalakrishnan

- DVD cover
- Directed by: Adoor Gopalakrishnan
- Written by: Adoor Gopalakrishnan
- Produced by: Adoor Gopalakrishnan; Joël Farges
- Starring: Oduvil Unnikrishnan; Sukumari
- Cinematography: Mankada Ravi Varma; Sunny Joseph
- Edited by: B. Ajithkumar
- Music by: Ilayaraaja
- Distributed by: Adoor Gopalakrishnan Productions; Artcam International; Les Films du Paradoxe
- Release date: 7 September 2002; (Venice)
- Running time: 90 minutes
- Country: India
- Language: Malayalam

Nizhalkuthu (English: Shadow Kill) is a 2002 Indian film in Malayalam directed, written and co-produced by Adoor Gopalakrishnan. The film explores the recesses of the human consciousness. It stars Oduvil Unnikrishnan in the lead role with Narain, Murali, Sukumari, Reeja, Nedumudi Venu, Vijayaraghavan, Jagathi Sreekumar and Tara Kalyan in supporting roles. It premiered at the Venice Film Festival in the Orizzonti section and received critical acclaim. The film was awarded the FIPRESCI Prize at the festival.

== Overview ==
The title of the film Nizhalkuthu (Shadow Kill) refers to a popular play Nizhalkuthu Attakatha, adapted from the Mahabharata, about the inherent unjustness of certain punishments. In the play, the Kauravas force a witch hunter to kill the Pandavas by stabbing their shadows. However, the witch hunter's wife finds this out and is enraged. To punish her husband by making him feel what Kunti, the mother of Pandavas must feel, she kills their child in the same way.

The film reflects that death penalty is probably in the same vein. We may---like the witch hunter's wife---be handing out punishments that are equally ridiculous under the false perception that we are doing justice, if not being directly criminal like the witch hunter.

Adoor's usual cinematographer Mankada Ravi Varma filmed half of the project. But he was later replaced by Sunny Joseph, since the former fell ill and was later found to be suffering from Alzheimer's disease.

== Plot ==
The plot is set in the 1940s in a village of Travancore, British India. Kaliyappan, the last hangman of Travancore is dragging his remaining life by consuming alcohol and worshipping the Mother Goddess. The reason for this self-destruction is the remorse born out of the feeling that the last man he hanged was innocent.

While pulling on his life by boozing, worshiping the Goddess and treating ailing people with the ash obtained by burning the hanging rope, one day the King's messenger once again arrives with the King's order of appointing him for executing a convict termed as 'a killer, proved beyond doubt'. He leaves for the jail with his Gandhian, freedom fighter son to assist him in his job.

As a tradition, the hangman has to spend the eve of the execution awake. When alcohol fails to keep Kaliyappan awake, the jailer starts telling a 'spicy tale' to keep him awake, the tale of a 13-year-old girl raped and killed by her own brother-in-law and an innocent musician boy convicted for this charge.

When Kaliyappan discovers that the condemned person he is about to hang is the musician boy, he breaks down. The job of executing the convict is passed on to his assistant, his son. The Gandhian, freedom fighter son completes the job. His motivations are not spelt out, but the choice of title hints that the son perhaps punishes the father by reminding him that any of his prior executions may have been a farce just like this.

Just like the witch hunter's wife in Mahabharata, the son's sense of punishment completely ignores the innocent victim who would be executed. We are reminded that what we think of something as just may not always be so.

== Cast ==
- Oduvil Unnikrishnan as Kaliyappan the executioner
- Sukumari as Marakatam, his wife
- Mallika (Reeja) as Mallika, the younger daughter
- Thara Kalyan as Madhavy, the older daughter
- Murali as Vasu, Madhavy's husband
- Siva Kumar as Mallika's lover
- Shivaji
- Narain as Muthu, Kaliyappan's son
- Nedumudi Venu as Jailer
- Vijayaraghavan as Jailer
- Jagathy Sreekumar as Maharajah's Officer
- Rachana Narayanankutty
- Indrans as Barber
- Vishnupriyan
- Cuckoo Parameswaran as Woman seeking treatment in Kaliyappan

== Critical reception ==
The film received critical praise.

== Awards ==
National Film Awards

- National Film Award for Best Feature Film in Malayalam - Adoor Gopalakrishnan

Kerala State Film Awards

- Best Actor - Oduvil Unnikrishnan
- Second Best Actor - Jagathy Sreekumar
- Best Costume Designer - S. B. Satheesh
- Best Editor - Ajithkumar
- Best Sound Recordist - N. Harikumar
- Kerala State Film Award for Best Photography - Mankada Ravivarma, Sunny Joseph
- Kerala State Film Award for Best Processing Lab - Prasad Laboratory, Chennai

Others

- Bombay International Film Festival - FIPRESCI Prize
- John Abraham Award for Best Malayalam Film - Adoor Gopalakrishnan
