= Chitranjali Studio =

Indian film production studio

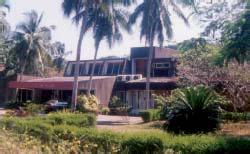
Administrative block in the Chitranjali campus

Chitranjali is a film production studio located in Thiruvananthapuram, Kerala, India. It was established in 1980s by the Kerala State Film Development Corporation (KSFDC).

The studio is located in the hilltop of Thiruvallam and is spread in 75 acres (300,000 m^{2}). The studio has the second largest sound proof indoor floor in Asia with 12,000 sq ft (1,100 m^{2}). The studio has four outdoor film units, film processing labs, dubbing studios, preview theatres etc. There was a revamp proposal of Rs. 100 crore by the government. The proposal was part of the corporation's initiative to facilitate the growth of Malayalam cinema.

== Filmography ==
Aadhyathe Katha (1972)
