= Kerala State Film Development Corporation =

State film promotion organization in Kerala, India

- Abbreviation: KSFDC
- Formation: 1975
- Headquarters: Chalachitra Kalabhavan; Vazhuthacaud; Thiruvananthapuram
- Website: KSFDC.in

Kerala State Film Development Corporation (abbreviated as KSFDC) is an organization founded by the Government of Kerala, India to promote the film market in the state. Founded in 1975—when Malayalam film production was largely centered in Madras (now Chennai)— KSFDC was established with the objective of moving the Malayalam film industry from Madras to Kerala. At the time of its inception, it was the first public sector organization of its kind for film development in India.

KSFDC organised the International Film Festival of Kerala annually until 1998, after which its management was handed over to the Kerala State Chalachitra Academy. KSFDC is the founder of the Chithranjali Studio. KSFDC owns a cinema exhibition network of ten theatres across Kerala. KSFDC also works as a production agency which makes public interest documentary films and short films for the Government of Kerala. Currently following the demise of Shaji N. Karun the chairman position is vacant.

== History ==
The demand for a studio in the public domain was first put forward by filmmaker Ramu Kariat, his idea was to make one along the lines of Moscow Film Studio, He, along with like minded filmmakers P. Bhaskaran and Thoppil Bhasi and many others met C. Achutha Menon, the then chief minister who in turn directed them to the then home minister K. Karunakaran who also looked after state's cinema. Karunakaran and the then secretary of government Malayattoor Ramakrishnan supported the demand. In 1975, the Kerala State Film Development Corporation (KSFDC) was formed with P. R. S. Pillai as its first chairman and G. Vivekanandan as the first managing director.

== Subsidiaries ==
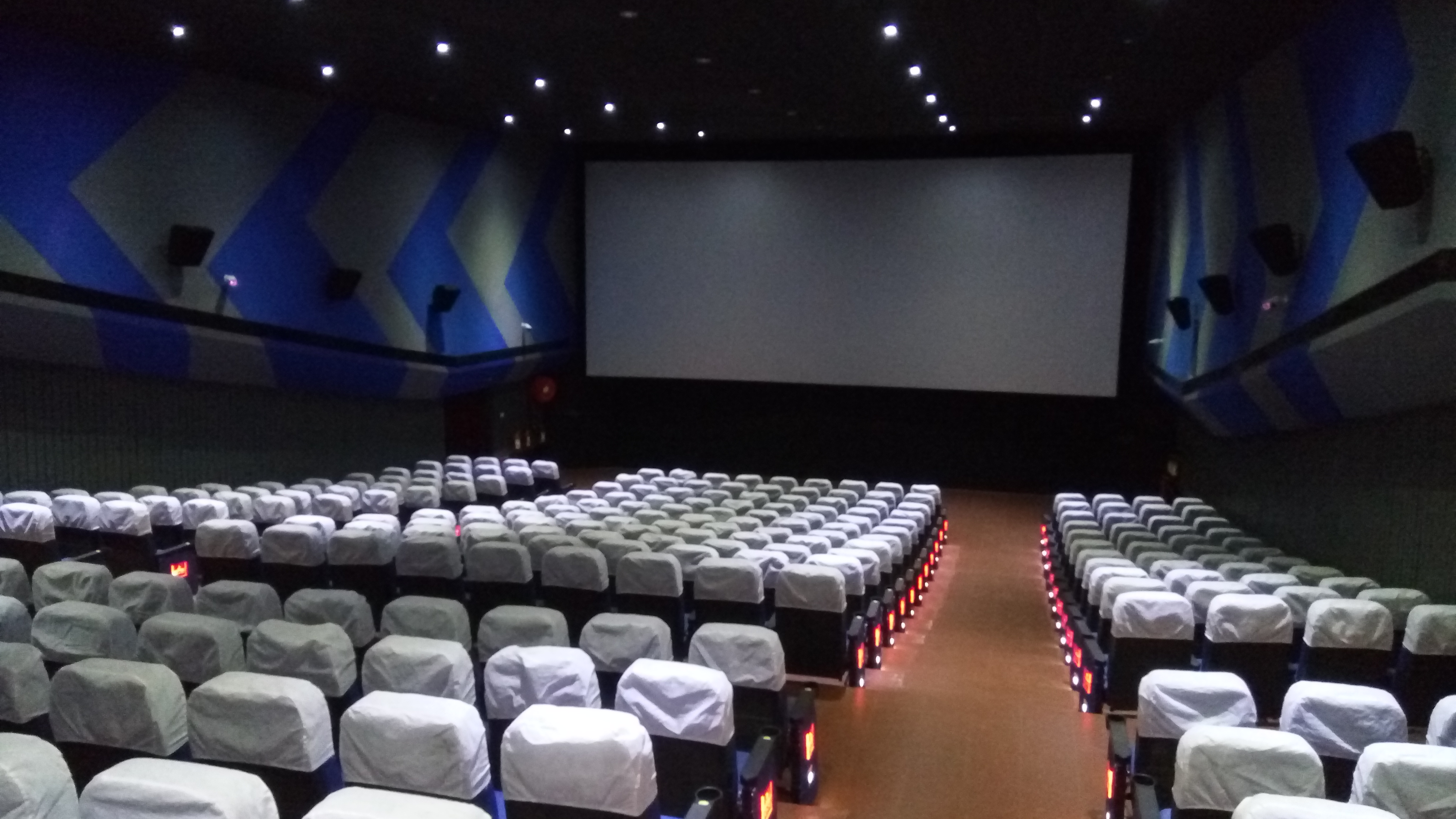
Sree theatre of KSFDC complex in Alappuzha

=== Kalabhavan Digital Studio ===
A digital post processing studio owned by the KSFDC.

=== Cinemas ===
KSFDC owns an exhibition network of 17 cinemas in Kerala namely:

- Kairali, Nila and Sree theatre complex, Thampanoor, Thiruvananthapuram
- Lenin cinemas, KSRTC Central Bus Station complex, Thampanoor, Thiruvananthapuram
- Kalabhavan Theatre, Chalachitrakalabhavan, Vazhuthacaud, Thiruvananthapuram
- Kairali & Sree twin theatres, Karunakaran Nambiar Road, Round North, Thrissur
- Kairali & Sree twin theatres, (I.G Road) Mavoor Road, Kozhikode
- Kairali & Sree twin theatres, Mullakkal, Alappuzha
- Kairali & Sree twin theatres, A.C Road Cherthala, Alappuzha District
- Kairali & Sree twin theatres, Pullomkulam, North Paravur, Ernakulam District
- Kairali & Sree twin theatres, Chittoor, Palakkad District

== Film production ==
In 2022 and 2023, KSFDC has produced 3 movies namely Nishiddho, Divorce and Nila for women empowerment to uplift the works of women directors. In 2025, the corporation produced a survival thriller film Pralayashesham Oru Jalakanyaka directed by Manoj Kumar.

== See also ==
- Chithranjali Studio
