= Irshad Ali (actor) =

Indian actor

- Born: Irshad Ali; Thrissur, Kerala, India
- Years active: 1995-present
- Spouse: Ramseena
- Children: 1

Irshad Ali, professionally credited as Irshad, is an Indian actor who works in Malayalam films and television.

== Career ==
He has acted in numerous award-winning art-house films including those directed by acclaimed filmmakers such as Pavithran, T. V. Chandran, P. T. Kunju Muhammed, and K. R. Mohanan. He has also appeared in supporting roles in a few mainstream films. He debuted as an actor in Sibi Malayil's campus story Pranayavarnangal (Colours of Love, 1998) then appeared in Garshom (1999). His notable films include T. V. Chandran's Dany (2002), Paadam Onnu: Oru Vilapam (Lesson One: A Wail, 2003), Vilapangalkkappuram (2008) and Bhoomi Malayalam (The Mother Earth, 2009), P. T. Kunju Muhammed's Paradesi (Foreigner, 2007), Madhu Kaithapram's Madhya Venal (2009), Priyanandanan's Pulijanmam (Tiger Life, 2006) and Bhakthajanangalude Sradhakku (2011), and Dr. Biju's Veettilekkulla Vazhi (The Way Home, 2010).

== Personal life ==
He was born to Puthenpura Nalakathu Abdu and Nafeesa, as the fourth son among six children, in Kechery, Thrissur. He has four brothers and a sister. He is married to Ramseena, a bank employee. They have a son, Arshaq.

== Filmography ==
Key
†	Denotes films that have not yet been released

=== Film ===
Year	Title	Role	Notes
1995	Puthukottayile Puthumanavalan		
1995	Parvathy Parinayam		
1997	Kudamattom		
1998	Pranayavarnangal	College Chairman	
1998	Manjukalavum Kazhinju		
1998	British Market	Johny	
1999	Garshom		
2000	Narasimham	Gopalan	
2000	Ingane Oru Nilapakshi		
2001	Praja	Sundaram	
2001	Ravanaprabhu		
2002	Neythukaran		
2002	Bhavam		
2002	Dany	Murukan	
2003	Pulival Kalyanam		
2003	Ivar	Nambi	
2003	Mizhi Randilum		
2003	Padam Onnu Oru Vilapam	Rasaq	
2004	Kanninum Kannadikkum	Abhirami's husband	
2004	Vajram	George	
2004	Kathavasheshan	Gopi's colleague	
2005	Kochirajavu	Prakashan	
2006	Pulijanmam	Ashraf	
2007	Atheetham	C.E.O	
2007	Paradesi		
2007	Paranju Theeratha Visheshangal	Sajeevan	
2008	Aandavan	Const.Rameshan	
2008	Vilapangalkkappuram		
2008	Mayabazar		
2008	Anthiponvettam		
2009	Aayirathil Oruvan	Rameshan	
2009	Bhoomi Malayalam		
2009	Sufi Paranja Kadha	Beeran	
2009	Madhya Venal		
2010	Annarakkannanum Thannalayathu		
2010	Cocktail		
2010	24 Hrs	Hazari	
2010	Drona 2010	Aadishankaran	
2011	Indian Rupee	Asharuf	
2011	Veetilekkulla Vazhi	Abdulla	
2011	Priyappetta Nattukare		
2011	Yathra Thudarunnu		
2011	Bhakthajanangalude Sradhakku	Viswanathan	
2011	Swapna Sanchari	Raveendran Nair	
2012	Masters	Sam George	
2012	Thaappaana	Sudhakaran	
2012	Namukku Parkkan		
2012	Streetlight	Sakhavu	
2012	Nidra		
2012	Ardhanaari	Jaganathan	
2012	Banking Hours 10 to 4		
2012	Veendum Kannur		
2013	Cowboy	Mohan	
2013	Radio	Pradeesh Nair	
2013	Black Butterfly		
2013	Natholi Oru Cheriya Meenalla		
2013	Celluloid		
2013	Red Wine	Dinesh	
2013	Climax	Victor Lenus	
2013	Left Right Left	Policeman	
2013	Vallatha Pahayan	Faisal	
2013	Pullipulikalum Aattinkuttiyum	Chakka Maniyan	
2013	Memories	Issac	
2013	3G Third Generation		
2013	Ginger	Mohan	
2013	D Company	Narendran	
2013	Pottas Bomb	Baby	
2013	Punyalan Agarbattis		
2013	Ezhu Sundara Rathrikal	Sound for police officer	
2013	Drishyam	SI Suresh Babu	
2014	Parayan Baaki Vechathu		
2014	Garbhasreeman	Ancient King	
2014	Naattarnagu		
2014	On The Way	Ravindran	
2014	Vikramadithyan	George Alexander	
2014	Varsham	Mohanan	
2014	To Noora with Love	Photographer	
2014	Mylanchi Monchulla Veedu	Ramesh Kurup	
2014	Sapthamsree Thaskaraha	Christo Mathew	
2015	Alif	Abu	
2015	Mayapuri 3D	Adithyan's father	
2015	Loham	Jayan	
2015	Onnum Onnum Moonu		
2015	Namukkore Aakaasam		
2015	Mariyam Mukku	Kaala George	
2015	Su Su Sudhi Vathmeekam	Kurup	
2016	Maalgudi Days	Sudarshan	
2016	Anuraga Karikkin Vellam	Irfan Khan	
2016	Kasaba	Antony	
2016	Kaadu Pookkunna Neram		
2017	Rarandoi Veduka Chudham	Prabhakar	Telugu film
2017	Jomonte Suvisheshangal	CA Joshy	
2018	Joseph	Siddique	
2019	Janamaithri	Ashok Kumar	
2019	Thanneer Mathan Dinangal	Principal	
2019	Vikruthi	Nazar	
2019	My Santa	Deepa's Brother	
2020	Silencer		
2020	Big Brother		
2020	Aandaal	Irulappan	
2021	Wolf	Joe	
2021	Bharathapuzha	Galfukaran	
2021	Operation Java	SI Prathapan	
2022	Randu		
2022	Sayanna Varthakal	Rajeev	
2022	Two Men	Sanjay Menon	
2022	Nalla Samayam	Samy Ettan	
2023	Padmini		
2023	Bhagavan Dasante Ramarajyam	Ravi	
2023	Corona Dhavan	Rocket Shibu	
2023	Imbam	Premarajan	
2024	Guruvayoor Ambalanadayil	Cheriyammavan	
2024	DNA	CI Eldho Varkey	
2024	Oru Anweshanathinte Thudakkam		
2025	Ariku		
2025	Thudarum	Shaji	
2026	Pennu Case		
2026	Valathu Vashathe Kallan	Head Constable Johnny Vincent	
2026	Drishyam 3	Suresh Babu	
2026	I, Nobody		
2026	Prempaatta †	Principal	
2027	Operation Cambodia †		

=== Television ===
Year	Title	Channel
1999	Ninavukal Novukal	DD Malayalam
2000	Jwala	DD Malayalam
2003	Prayanam	DD Malayalam
2004	Mizhi Thurakkumbol	Surya TV
2004	Kayamkulam Kochunnni	Surya TV
2005	Anweshi	DD Malayalam
2006	Velutha Kathreena	Kairali TV
2006	Unniyarcha	Asianet
2006	Swami Ayyappan	Asianet
2007	Chandrodayam	DD Malayalam
2007	Kanalpoovu	Kairali TV
2007	Minnal Kesari	Surya TV
2008	MT Kathakal	Amrita TV
2008	Kudumbayogam	Surya TV
2010	Kunjali Marakkar	Asianet
2013	Radhamadhavam	Surya TV
2015	Manasariyathe	Surya TV
