= Babu Annur =

Indian actor (born 1962)

- ബാബു അന്നൂർ
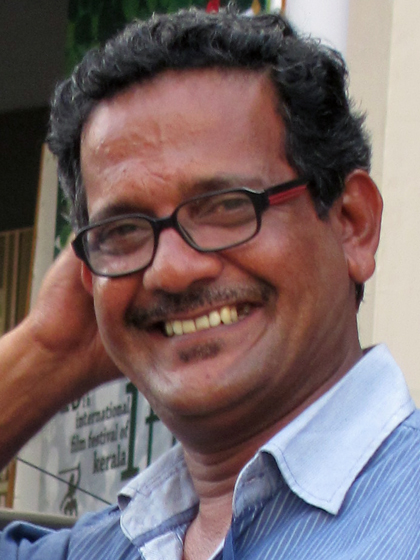
- Born: Babu; 14 May 1962; Kannur, Kerala
- Occupation: Actor
- Awards: Best Actor award constituted by Kerala Sangeetha Nataka Akademi in 1998 for the play Kelu

Babu Annur also known as C. K. Babu is an Indian film and theater actor, working predominantly in the Malayalam movie industry. He has actively been involved in theater in Malayalam as an actor since 1974. He has done more than seventy-five plays as of 2020. Babu was born on 14 May 1962 in the municipality of Payyannur, Kannur, to Kunjirama Pothuval and Kodi Amma. He started acting in theater at the age of twelve as a child artist at Ravi Varma Kala Nilayam with his elder brothers CK Ramakrishnan & CK Thamapan who were involved in theatre.,

== Awards ==
- Best Actor award constituted by Kerala Sangeetha Nataka Akademi in 1998 for the play Kelu
- Best Second Actor award constituted by Kerala Sangeetha Nataka Akademi in 2002 for the play Agniyum Varshavum
- Kerala State television awards in 2005 Special jury award for Janmam credited as CK Babu
- Kerala State Television Award for Best Actor in 2011 for Divathinu swantham Devootty.

== Filmography ==
Year	Title	Role	Notes
1994	Ilayum Mullum	Debut	
1997	Mangamma		
2003	Ek Alag Mausam		Hindi Film
2003	Paadam Onnu: Oru Vilapam	Khasim Mash	
2004	4 the People	Mahadevan MP	
2004	Kathavasheshan		
2006	Pulijanmam		
2007	Thaniye	Priest	
2008	Vilapangalkkappuram		
2008	Ssh..Silence Please		Lead role; Gibberish
2009	Boomi Malayalam		
2010	Sufi Paranja Katha		
2011	Bhakthajanangalude Sradhakku		
2013	Olipporu		
2013	Oru Indian Pranayakatha	Sethumadhavan	
2015	Ennum Eppozhum	Peon	
2015	Love 24x7	Roopesh's Father	
2015	Ayal Njanalla	Aravindan	
2016	Grace Villa		Short Film
2017	Karutha Joothan		
2018	Eeda	Gopalan	
2018	Vikadakumaran	Anthony	
2018	Kammara Sambhavam	Pattar	
2018	Uncle	Hameed	
2018	Oru Pazhaya Bomb Kadha	Unnikrishnan's Father	
2018	BTech	Advocate	
2018	Iblis	Sulaiman	
2018	Paviyettante Madhurachooral		
2019	Mr. & Ms. Rowdy	Poornima's Uncle	
2019	Muttayikkallanum Mammaliyum		
2019	Kakshi: Amminippilla	Sivadasan	
2019	Karuthamuthu	Sukeshan's father	TV series on Asianet
2019	Isakkinte Ithihasam	Poornima's Uncle	
2021	Vellam	Murali's father	
2022	Thallumaala	Building partner	
2024	Sree Muthappan		
2024	Kunddala Puranam		
2024	Porattu Nadakam	Maxi Maman	

=== Television serials ===
- 2019–Karuthamuthu (Asianet)
- 2024–Ishtam Mathram (Asianet)
