= Kerala State Film Award – Special Jury Award =

Annual Indian film award

The Kerala State Film Award – Special Jury Award is presented annually at the Kerala State Film Awards of India.

== Winners ==
Year	Recipient	Awarded as	Film(s) / Book	Ref.
1977	G. Aravindan	Director	Kanchana Sita	
1978	V. K. Pavithran	Director	Yaro Oraal	
1979	John Abraham	Director	Cheriyachante Kroorakrithyangal	
1981	Prem Nazir	Actor	Vida Parayum Munpe; Parvathy	
1981	S. Kumar	Producer	Cancerum Laingika Rogangalum - Educational Documentary	
1982	V R Gopinath	Director	Story of a Revolution - Documentary	
1983	P. N. Menon	Director	Malamukalile Daivam	
1985	A. R. Sadanandan	Cinematographer	Pururavas	
1985	Anand Sankar	Composer	Pururavas	
1985	Mammootty	Actor	Yathra; Nirakkoottu	
1986	V. K. Pavithran	Director	Uppu	
1987	Lenin Rajendran	Director	Swathi Thirunal	
1987	M. B. Sreenivasan	Composer	Swathi Thirunal	
1988	Mohanlal	Actor	Paadha Mudra; Chithram; Ulsavapittennu; Aryan; Vellanakalude Nadu	
1989	Thilakan	Actor	Various films	
1990	Kaviyoor Sivaprasad	Director	Vembanad	
1991	Nedumudi Venu	Actor	Bharatham; Sandhwanam	
1992	Madhu	Actor	Kudumbasammetham	
1993	M. R. Gopakumar	Actor	Vidheyan	
1994	Harikumar	Director	Sukrutham	
1995	T. V. Chandran	Director	Ormakalundayirikkanam	
1996	Jayaram	Actor	Various films	
1997	Balachandra Menon	Actor	Samaantharangal	
1998				
1999	Kalabhavan Mani	Actor	Vasanthiyum Lakshmiyum Pinne Njaanum	
2000	T. V. Chandran	Director	Susanna	
2001	Jayaram	Actor	Sesham	
2001	O. K. Johny	Author	Cinemayude Varthamanam	
2002	Dileep	Actor	Kunjikkoonan	
2002	Mangad Rathnakaran	Author	Sathyacinema Pusthakam Adhava Loomiyarmaarude Makkal	
2003	P. Sreekumar	Actor	Paadam Onnu: Oru Vilapam	
2003	Meera Krishnan	Actress	Margam	
2003	K J Baby	Screenwriter	Guda	
2004	Pradeep Nair	Director	Oridam	
2009	Jagathy Sreekumar	Actor	Various films	
2010	Premlal	Director	Athmakadha	
2010	Thalaivasal Vijay	Actor	Yugapurushan	
2011	Dr. Biju	Director	Akasathinte niram	
2011	C. S. Venkiteswaran	Writer of best book on cinema	'Malayala Cinema Padanangal'	
2012	Jayan K. Cherian	Director	Papilio Buddha	
2012	Kiran Raveendran	Writer(Article on cinema)	'Sesham Vellithirayil'	
2013	Aneesh Anwar	Director	Zachariayude Garbhinikal	
2013	Mridula Warrier	Singer	Kalimannu	
2014	Pratap K. Pothen	Actor	Once Upon A Time There Was A Kallan	
2015	Jayasurya	Actor	Su.. Su... Sudhi Vathmeekam; Lukka Chuppi	
2016	K. Kaladharan	Actor	Ottayal Patha	
2017	Vinitha Koshy	Actress	Ottamuri Velicham	
2018	Madhu Ambat	Cinematographer	And the Oscar Goes To..., Pani	
2019	Sidharth Priyadharshan	Visual Effects	Marakkar: Lion of the Arabian Sea	
2020	Sarjas Muhammed	Visual Effects	Love	
2021	Sherry Govindan	Direction	Avanovilona	
2022	Kunchacko Boban	Actor	Nna Thaan Case Kodu	
2022	Alencier Ley Lopez	Actor	Appan	

== See also ==
- Kerala State Film Award – Special Mention
