= Sankaranum Mohananum =

- Film DVD cover
- Directed by: T. V. Chandran
- Written by: T. V. Chandran
- Produced by: Prem Prakash; Raju Malliath
- Starring: Jayasurya; Meera Nandan; Rima Kallingal
- Cinematography: Pradeep Nair
- Edited by: Venugopal
- Music by: Isaac Thomas Kottukapally (film score); Mohan Sithara (songs)
- Production companies: Prakash Movietone; Ragam Movies
- Distributed by: Century Films
- Release date: 10 June 2011
- Country: India
- Language: Malayalam

Sankaranum Mohananum (English: Sankaran and Mohanan) is a 2011 Malayalam fantasy/comedy/drama film written and directed by T. V. Chandran. It stars Jayasurya in dual role, Meera Nandan and Rima Kallingal in the lead roles. The film is about the strange incidents faced by Mohanakrishnan (Jayasurya) from the ghost of his elder brother Sankaran (also played by Jayasurya). It is regarded as the first mainstream film of Chandran, who is known for his well-crafted art house films. Jayasurya also dons 20 different appearances in the film.

The film was screened in the "Malayalam Cinema Today" section at the 16th International Film Festival of Kerala (IFFK), in Thiruvananthapuram, Kerala in 2011.

== Plot ==
The film is a journey through the mind of Mohanakrishnan, a fashion photographer living in Kochi. He was earlier based in Mumbai, and is separated from his wife, Jyotsna Mathew, a model and aspiring actress who lives in Mumbai with their child. His older brother Sankaran is a school teacher in Malabar. Sankaran, in his early forties, marries a much younger woman named Rajalakshmi, but he dies of a snakebite the day after the wedding. The ghost of Shankaran haunts Mohanakrishnan from then on. Sankaran's undying love for his wife and also the lack of love in the life of his brother is the reason why Sankaran haunts Mohanakrishnan. The ghost appears before Mohanakrishnan in various get-ups and what keeps Sankaran going is his eternal devotion toward his wife and brother.

== Cast ==
- Jayasurya in a dual role as:
  - Sankaran
  - Mohanakrishnan
- Meera Nandan as Rajalakshmi
- Rima Kallingal as Jyotsna Mathew
- Jagathy Sreekumar
- Suraj Venjaramood
- Manikandan Pattambi
- Sudheesh
- Biju Kuttan
- Indrans
- Kochu Preman
- Ambika
- Rosilin
- Shivaji Guruvayoor
- Jijoy Rajagopal

== Production ==
Photoshoot of the film was done by popular photographer Mahadevan Thampi at 23 February 2011, Then the Pooja function was held at the date of 26 February Jayasurya would have 20 makeovers for Sankaranum Mohananum being directed by T V Chandran. Perhaps in the history of films, very few actors have had so many makeovers within a single film. Sankaranum Mohananum is being filmed under the banner of Prakash Movietone and Ragam Movies.

== Reception ==
The film met with negative reviews from critics. Veeyen of Nowrunning.com rated the film and said: "The crossover of the director to commercial cinema, if at all it has been attempted, is a total disaster. As much as it remains a fantasy, there is absolutely nothing in the film that would confront your intellect, and there is plenty that would question your intelligence." Sify.com concluded its review saying, "Sankaranum Mohananum turns out to be a major disappointment from a noted director like T V Chandran. The film tests your patience in a big way and ends up as a colossal bore, no less. Sad!" Paresh C Palicha of Rediff.com commented that the film is a "funny ghost story gone wrong" and gave a rating of.
