= Bhoomiyude Avakashikal =

2012 Malayalam movie

- DVD cover
- Directed by: T. V. Chandran
- Screenplay by: T. V. Chandran
- Based on: Bhoomiyude Avakashikal by Vaikom Muhammad Basheer
- Produced by: Anand Kumar
- Starring: Kailash; Sreenivasan; Shankar; Mythili
- Cinematography: Ramachandra Babu
- Edited by: Johnkutty
- Music by: Sandeep Pillai
- Production company: Yes Cinema
- Distributed by: Vismaya, Prism & Pixels
- Release date: 27 November 2012 (IFFI)
- Running time: 114 minutes
- Country: India
- Language: Malayalam

Bhoomiyude Avakashikal (transl. Inheritors of the Earth) is a 2012 Indian Malayalam-language film written and directed by T. V. Chandran based on a novel of the same name by Vaikom Muhammad Basheer. The film stars Kailash in the lead role along with Sreenivasan and Mythili who play pivotal supporting roles. The film was produced by Anand Kumar under the banner of Yes Cinema and it was mainly shot in Nelliyampathi, Ottappalam and Shoranur in Kerala.

Bhoomiyude Avakashikal is the third and last installment of T. V. Chandran's trilogy on 2002 Gujarat riots. The first one was, Kathavasheshan (2004), it was followed by Vilapangalkkappuram (2008). The narratives of all these films begin on the same day, 28 February 2002, that is, on the day after the Godhra train burning in Gujarat. Bhoomiyude Avakashikal tells the story of Mohanachandran Nair, who is driven away from Ahmadabad following the Gujarat riots and who eventually loses his job and even his identity and ultimately lands up in a secluded house in Kerala, in the company of insects and animals with whom he shares his thoughts, concerns, doubts and frustrations. The film was shot digitally to reduce costs as it was required to film several insects and animals in their natural habitat.

The film premiered at the 43rd International Film Festival of India on 27 November 2012. It was also an official selection for the International Film Festival of Kerala.

== Plot ==
Mohanachandran Nair is a Malayali youth working in Ahmadabad, Gujarat. On 28 February 2002, a day after the Godhra train burning, he is driven away from the city, after he makes a futile attempt to save a Muslim woman hunted by a group of Hindu fanatics. He reappears in Kerala but without any marks of identity. He has lost his job, ID cards and name. In the new place, he is helped by a man called Beeran Ikka, who is a warm and gentle human being, whose only passion in life is music.

But, eventually, Ikka too is killed during a communal clash. Mohanachandran Nair is forced to move away from that place. Finally, he goes back to a secluded house that was bequeathed to him by chance (even his lineages are doubtful). He starts living a peaceful life there by sharing his thoughts, concerns, doubts and frustrations with various kinds of animals around him. He eventually discovers that he is not the only owner of the land. Even the animals and insects that live on that patch of land are inheritors too, he discovers. He also maintains a warm relationship with his neighbour, a school teacher.

But, again, another altruistic act of his attracts hatred from society. In the end, he feels that his being there would only bring trouble to those creatures living in that space. And he decides to walk out, one doesn't know where to.

== Cast ==
- Kailash as Mohanachandran Nair
- Sreenivasan as Beeran Ikka
- Mythili as Mohanachandran Nair's neighbour
- Shankar
- Shahabaz Aman as Aravindan
- Meera Nandan
- Mamukkoya
- Indrans as Postman
- Shilpi Marwaha
- Arun
- Urmila Unni
- EA Rajendran
- Vishnu Unnikrishnan
- Gopika Anil
- Esther Anil

== Themes ==
In an interview with noted film critic C. S. Venkiteswaran of The Hindu newspaper, T. V. Chandran said,

In one word, the film is about 'endangerment'. Not only are several species on earth becoming endangered and extinct every day, the most significant casualty is humanity or the condition of 'being human'. Humanity is the most endangered thing in our lives now; we are not only pushing all other life forms out of the earth, but, in the process, humaneness too, the ability to coexist with others, tolerance for others and all that make human life worth living. This film is about a man who is driven away from place to place by human intolerance, violence and hatred. Finally, he finds a place devoid of humans, in a dilapidated house in the middle of a vast compound, amongst all forms of flora and fauna. But, eventually, 'humanity' catches up with him there too.

Venkiteswaran notes that Bhoomiyude Avakashikal is "perhaps the first Malayalam film that leaves the human and the anthropocentric narration behind, and explores the realm of the non-human." In his reply, Chandran said,

All my films till now have dealt with the human world and the various kinds of oppressions working within it; but here, you have the protagonist sharing his thoughts, concerns, doubts and frustrations with various kinds of animals around him such as frogs, spiders, tortoises, snakes and rats. He converses with the rats, tortoises and spiders. This took hours to get these animals to 'act', we had to follow them for hours to capture the right moment, and I think Ramachandrababu, our cameraman, had a tough time.

== Production ==
=== Pre-production ===
The film's title is adapted from the famous short story "Bhoomiyude Avakashikal" by Vaikom Muhammad Basheer although the film is not based on the story. Also the film is done as a tribute to Basheer and his ideologies. Chandran says, "No, the film is not based on the Basheer story, but it is a film that is dedicated to him. In fact, the title draws not only from Basheer but also from the Red Indian Chief who told the American President that they are the real inheritors of the earth. The film is actually dedicated to Basheer, the great musical genius M. S. Baburaj, and the vanishing habitats of Kerala."

Noted scenarist and actor Sreenivasan is associating with Chandran nearly after two decades. Sreenivasan had donned a key role in the 1995 film Ormakal Undayirikkanam. Through this film, Kailash makes his comeback to Malayalam cinema after a certain gap. Meghna Raj was originally cast for the lead female role. She opted out citing busy schedules and the role was later given to Mythili, while veteran actor Shankar played a cameo. Bhoomiyude Avakashikal will also see music director Shahabaz Aman make his acting debut.

=== Filming ===
Bhoomiyude Avakashikal commenced its production in June 2012 and the film was shot mainly from Nelliyampathi, Ottappalam and Shoranur in Kerala. Chandran says, "To shoot this film, I really had to search all over Kerala to find a vast and bio-diverse compound with all our common flora and fauna. Though it was very common a few decades ago, it has totally vanished with human habitation taking over our earth, driving out all other organisms and life forms." Veteran cinematographer Ramachandra Babu associates with Chandran for the first time through this film although their friendship, according to Chandran, dates back to the time of Agraharathil Kazhutai (1977), in which Chandran assisted the famed filmmaker John Abraham and Babu wielded the camera. Filming lasted for more than a month from June 2012 and the shoot was wrapped up by August.

Chandran ensured that the crew was bare minimum so as not to disturb the animals in their natural settings. Kailash recounts how the shooting of the flick was also different. "We've shot animals — including frogs, chameleons and millipedes — in their natural setting. One morning, when Chandran and cameraman Ramachandra Babu returned from their morning walk in Nelliyampathi, they brought with them a rare breed of millipede, which they found on their way. If earlier, I was bothered about how comfortable my co-stars are, this time around, all of us on the sets ensured that the animals and insects around had no hassles because of us," he says. Kailash recalls the filming of once scene to describe how difficult it was to film various sequences involving the insects and others creatures. The film has a scene wherein the hero keenly observes an ant climbing up his hand. "Of course, the ant didn't come up my hand like we wanted it to. But the entire crew waited patiently for it do its 'act' and a long wait later, it finally rose to our expectations!"

The film was shot digitally to reduce costs as it was required to film several insects and animals in their natural habitat. "You can make Mammootty or Mohanlal act, but not a tortoise. That will be a costly affair and one reason why we have to depend on digital film-making," says Chandran. Replying to a query during the 'Meet the Directors' programme at the 17th International Film Festival of Kerala (IFFK), Chandran described how difficult it was to get a tortoise look right or left as the script required. "It took more than a day for that particular shot and if the movie was made on reel film, it would have cost a bomb," said Chandran. However, pointing out the pitfalls in digital cinematography, Chandran says he would have preferred the conventional mode if he need not have to worry about the costs.

== Release ==
Bhoomiyude Avakashikal premiered at the International Film Festival of India on 27 November 2012. The film was screened in the Indian Panorama section of the 43rd edition of the festival. It was one of the two Malayalam films screened in the International Competition section of the 17th International Film Festival of Kerala.

The film was an official selection for the following festivals:

- November 2012: 43rd International Film Festival of India - Indian Panorama
- December 2012: 17th International Film Festival of Kerala - International Competition
- December 2012: 10th Chennai International Film Festival - Indian Panorama
