= Oru Manushyan =

- Short story by Vaikom Muhammad Basheer
- Original title: ഒരു മനുഷ്യൻ
- Language: Malayalam

Publication
- Published in: Pavapettavarude Veshya
- Publication type: Anthology
- Publisher: S.P.C.S., Kottayam
- Publication date: 1952

"Oru Manushyan" (English: A Certain Man) is a short story written by Vaikom Muhammad Basheer. It was originally published in Mathrubhumi Illustrated Weekly and later included in the 1952 collection Pavapettavarude Veshya (The Prostitute of the Poor). The story is about a man living in a town notorious for its people's greed, who has saved his meagre earnings in his wallet, only to have it stolen at a restaurant; threatened to be stripped naked and left without any help, he is eventually saved by a stranger who shows him kindness by returning his wallet. It is one of the most popular of Basheer's stories. It was adapted into a telefilm of the same name by T. V. Chandran. The story is a subject of instruction at schools and colleges.

== Plot summary ==
The protagonist of the story is a man who finds himself stranded in a big city 1,500 miles away from home. He is unfamiliar with the area and does not speak the native language. The crime rate is high because individuals are ruthless and willing to do everything for money. They serve in banks, mills, and commercial institutions as soldiers, money lenders, and watchmen. They want to learn English so they can write addresses in English at the post office. The protagonist, who lives in a small room, earns his living by teaching English to them in the evening, and sleeps all day to save on costs.

One day, he goes to a restaurant to have a meal at 4 pm. He eats a hearty meal and drinks some tea as well. The bill comes to eleven annas (around 70 paise). When he reaches into his pocket to pay the bill, he realises that his purse, containing his life's savings of fourteen rupees, is missing. He tells the restaurant owner that someone has picked his pocket. The restaurant owner accuses him of trying to trick him and threatens to gouge his eyes out if he does not pay. The protagonist is left stranded and hopeless in front of a group of people who appear to be wolves. He begs the owner to keep his coat as collateral. The owner, however, chortles and demands that he take off his coat, shirt, and shoes. None of the other customers are willing to help, and the protagonist is forced to strip naked by the owner and the other patrons.

As the situation escalates, a blue-eyed man with a red turban appears from the crowd and pays the bill. The protagonist is grateful and tries to express his gratitude, but the stranger just laughs it off. The protagonist asks the man his name, but he says he does not have one. The protagonist suggests calling him 'Mercy', but the stranger does not respond to that. The stranger takes the protagonist to a deserted spot and pulls out five wallets from his pocket, asking the protagonist to identify his. The stranger warns the protagonist not to tell anyone about the incident and leaves, wishing him God's protection. The protagonist is grateful for the stranger's help and prays that God will bless him.

== Translation ==
- "A Man". In Poovan Banana and Other Stories (1994). Translated from Malayalam by V. Abdulla

== Adaptation ==
Noted director T. V. Chandran directed a telefilm titled Oru Manushyan based on the short story. C. K. Babu plays the protagonist, Raveendar plays the restaurant owner and Shivaji plays the pickpocket.
