= Isaac Thomas Kottukapally =

Indian film music composer (died 2021)

- Born: 1948 or 1949; Pala, Kottayam, Kerala
- Died: 18 February 2021 (aged 72) Chennai, Tamilnadu
- Genres: Film score, world music, Dance music, Classical music
- Occupations: Composer, Screenwriter, Filmmaker
- Instruments: Musical keyboard, Piano

Isaac Thomas Kottukapally (1948/9 – 18 February 2021) was an Indian film score composer, music director and script writer working mainly in Malayalam, Kannada and Hindi films. He scored music for several English documentaries and commercials.

Isaac debuted as a composer into the film industry with the National award-winning Kannada film Thaayi Saheba (1997) directed by Girish Kasaravalli. For his background score in the film Adaminte Makan Abu (2010), Isaac won the Best Music Director award at the 58th National Film Awards. He also won the Kerala State Film Awards five times for his scores in various Malayalam films.

== Early life ==
Isaac was the son of former Member of Parliament George Thomas Kottukapally and was a member of the Kottukapally family of Pala, Kerala. His childhood activities predominantly revolved around arts and music. He received his schooling at the Bishop Cotton Boys' School. At home in Pala, he was exposed to an extensive collection of music and literature. His fascination with the works of composers like C. Ramachandra, Bombay Ravi, Madan Mohan and S. D. Burman pushed him towards music composition. He was interested in ballets and operas and also began to write scripts. While doing his graduation at the Madras Christian College, he decided to enroll himself at the Film and Television Institute of India (FTII) at Pune. He obtained his postgraduate diploma in Film direction and screenplay writing. Subsequently, he began to assist G. Aravindan for films like Thampu (1978), Kummatty (1979) and Esthappan (1980).

== Career ==
Isaac entered into film composing with the Kannada film Thaayi Saheba released in 1997. The film was received well by the critics and the music was appreciated. This paved the way for a long association of Isaac with the director Girish Kasaravalli. He went on to score Kasaravalli's future films such as Kraurya (1996), Dweepa (2002), Naayi Neralu (2006) and Gulabi Talkies (2008).

In Malayalam, he composed for many films such as Margam, Sancharram, Kutty Srank, Punyam Aham and Adaminte Makan Abu, which won him Kerala State Awards and National film award. His score for the 1:1.6 An Ode to Lost Love (2004) was also appreciated at the Panorama at the International Film Festival of India.

He Composed famous theme songs of Malayalam Televeision channels like Kairali Television - 'Neelavaaninnu Keezhilayi' ..Lyrics O. N. V. Kurup He made several advertisements. He introduced A. R. Rahman to the world ad jingles as musici composer in 1987. The ad was for Bhavan’s Photo Studio, Ernakulam. The 60-second ad jingle was on every Malayali’s lips for a long time. Later AR Rahman became famous musician after the release of the Tamil Film Roja.

== Discography ==
Year	Film	Language	Songs	Background score	Notes
1994	Swaham	Malayalam		check	
1998	Thaayi Saheba	Kannada	check	check	
2002	Nishaad	Hindi		check	
2002	Bhavam	Malayalam	check	check	
2002	Dweepa	Kannada	check	check	
2003	Margam	Malayalam		check	
2004	Bimba	Kannada	check	check	
2004	Kanavu Meippada Vendum	Tamil		check	
2004	Sancharram	Malayalam	check	check	
2004	Oridam	Malayalam		check	
2004	Kaya Taran	Hindi	check	check	
2004	Kathavasheshan	Malayalam		check	
2004	Hasina	Kannada	check	check	
2006	Kamli	Telugu		check	
2006	Naayi Neralu	Kannada		check	
2006	Kurukshetram	Tamil		check	
2007	Thoovanam	Tamil	check	check	
2008	Aadum Koothu	Tamil		check	
2008	Gulabi Talkies	Kannada	check	check	
2009	Boomi Malayalam	Malayalam		check	
2010	Adaminte Makan Abu	Malayalam		check	
2010	Veettilekkulla Vazhi	Malayalam		check	
2010	Kutty Srank	Malayalam	check	check	
2011	Koormavatara	Kannada		check	
2011	Varnam	Tamil	check	check	
2012	Parudeesa	Malayalam		check	
2013	Kunjananthante Kada	Malayalam		check	

== Awards and nominations ==
Award	Year	Project	Category Won
Kerala State Film Award	2002	Bhavam	Best Background Music
Kerala State Film Award	2003	Margam	Best Background Score
Kerala State Film Award	2004	Sancharram & Oridam	Best Background Score
National Film Award	2010	Adaminte Makan Abu	Best Background Score
Kerala State Film Award	2010	Adaminte Makan Abu, Veettilekkulla Vazhi	Best Background Score
