= P. Sreekumar =

Indian actor and director (born 1944)

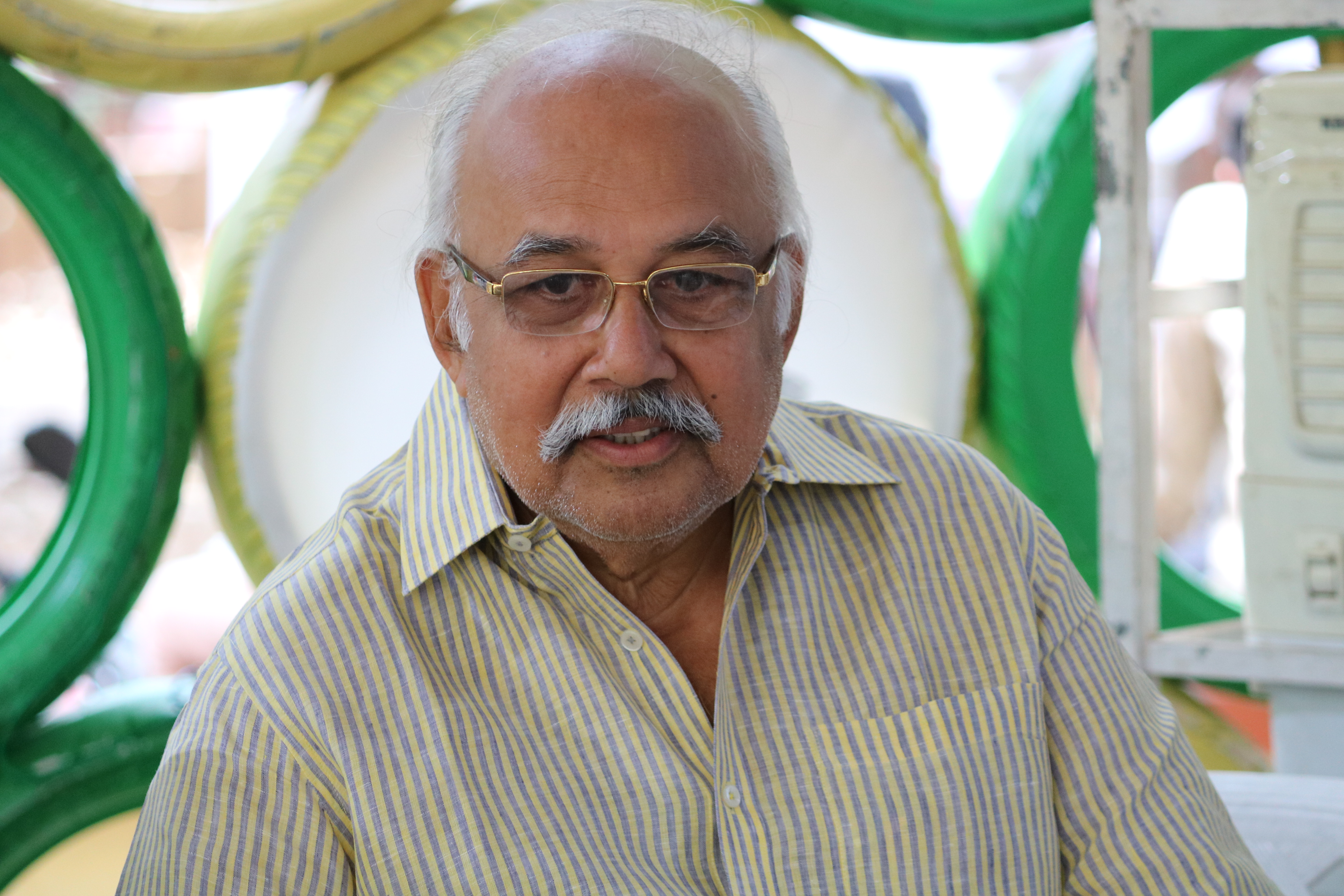
- Born: 28 February 1948 (age 78); Thiruvananthapuram, Travancore
- Occupation: Film actor
- Years active: 1966–present
- Spouse: Vasantha
- Children: Chinthu, Devi.
- Parent(s): Parameshwaran Nair, Parukuttiyamma

Parameshwaran Sreekumar is an Indian actor, scriptwriter, director and producer who appears in Malayalam movies. He has acted in more than 150 Malayalam films. Presently he is serving as the Chairman of Kerala Cultural Activists Welfare Fund Board.

== Background ==
P. Sreekumar was born on 9 March 1944, as the son of Parameshwaran Nair and Parukuttiyamma(parvati) at Thiruvananthapuram. He made his debut through Kannur Deluxe a Malayalam movie in 1968. He had two younger brothers named Dilip Kumar, Prem Kumar and sisters Prabha, Shoba and Sandhya. He was a former employee of Kerala State Road Transport Corporation.

== Family ==
He is married to S.Vasantha. The couple has two children, Chinthu Sreekumar and Devi.

== Awards ==
- 2003 - Kerala State Film Award (Special Jury Award) - Paadam Onnu: Oru Vilapam

== Selected filmography ==
=== As an actor ===
- Kannur Deluxe (1969) as K R Radha
- Nazhikakkallu (1970)
- Jayikkanayi Janichavar (1978)
- Seetha (1980)
- Swarnappakshikal (1981)
- Odaruthammava Aalariyam (1984)
- Susanna (2000)
- Pilots (2000)
- Cover Story (2000)
- Vakkalathu Narayanankutty (2001)
- Onnaman (2002)
- Ente Hridayathinte Udama (2002)
- Sesham (2002)
- Dany (2002)
- Margam (2003)
- Achuvinte Amma (2005)
- Rappakal (2005)
- Nerariyan CBI (2005)
- Krithyam (2005)
- Rasathanthram (2006)
- Lion (2006) as Chief Minister Avarachen
- Babakalyani (2006)
- Rashtram (2006)
- Bada Dosth (2006) as Pilla
- Nottam (2006)
- Mayavi (2007)
- Avan Chandiyude Makan (2007) as Soman Pillai
- Chocolate (2007)
- Nasrani (2007)
- AKG (2007) as AKG
- Time (2007)
- Paranju Theeratha Visheshangal (2007)
- Naalu Pennungal (2007)
- Flash (2007)
- Lollipop (2008)
- Kanchivaram (2008)
- Minnaminnikoottam (2008)
- Samastha Keralam PO (2009)
- Hailesa (2009)
- Robin Hood (2009)
- Daddy Cool (2009)
- Bhagyadevatha (2009)
- Apoorvaragam (2010)
- Kutty Srank (2010)
- Pramani (2010)
- Sadgamaya (2010)
- Thaskara Lahala (2010)
- The Thriller (2010)
- Neelambari (2010)
- Elektra (2010)
- Sakudumbam Shyamala (2010)
- Mohabbath (2011)
- Manikiakkallu (2011)
- Sandwich (2011)
- Christian Brothers (2011)
- Kudumbasree Travels (2011)
- Perinoru Makan (2012)
- Simhasanam (2012)
- The King & The Commissioner (2012)
- Lisammayude Veedu (2012)
- Theevram (2012)
- Chettayees (2012)
- Rebecca Uthup Kizhakkemala (2013)
- Progress Report (2013)
- Musafir (2013)
- Swapaanam (2013)
- Drishyam (2013)
- Ettekaal Second (2014)
- Swapaanam (2014)
- Salaam Kashmier (2014)
- Ammakkoru Tharattu (2015)
- Fireman (2015)
- Njan Samvidhanam Cheyyum (2015)
- Pa Va (2016)
- Once Again (2016)
- Vilakkumaram (2017)
- Kala Viplavam Pranayam (2017)
- Oolu (2018)
- Janaadhipan (2019)
- March Randaam Vyazham (2019)
- Master (2021)
- Nizhal (2021)
- Kshanam (2021)
- Oru Anweshanathinte Thudakkam (2024)

=== As a director ===
- Kayyum Thalayum Purathidaruthu (1985)
- Asthikal Pookkunnu (1989)
- Vishnu (1994 film)

=== As an Assistant Director ===
- Anantaram (1987)

=== Screenplay ===
- Asthikal Pookkunnu (1989)

=== Dialogue ===
- Asthikal Pookkunnu (1989)

Kayyum thalayum purathidaruth

=== Story ===
- Asthikal Pookkunnu (1989)
- Kalippaattam (1993)

== Television serials ==
- Manasu Parayunna Karyangal (Mazhavil Manorama)
- Kadamattathu kathanar (Asianet)
- Ente Manasaputhri (Asianet)
- Kanalpoovu (Jeevan TV)
- Namukku Paarkkuvan Munthirithoppukal (Surya TV)
