= Kathavaseshan =

- Directed by: T. V. Chandran
- Written by: T. V. Chandran
- Produced by: Dileep; Anoop
- Starring: Dileep; Jyothirmayi
- Cinematography: K. G. Jayan
- Edited by: V. P. Krishnakumar
- Music by: Songs: M. Jayachandran; Isaac Thomas Kottukapally; Score: Isaac Thomas Kottukapally
- Production company: Grand Productions
- Distributed by: Kalasangham Films; KAS; Right Release
- Release date: 11 November 2004
- Running time: 120 minutes
- Country: India
- Language: Malayalam

Kathavaseshan (transl. The Deceased): Epilogue to a life lived is a 2004 Indian Malayalam-language mystery drama film written and directed by T. V. Chandran. It stars Dileep and Jyothirmayi in the lead roles. Veteran Bengali actress Gita Dey made a special appearance. It was the first movie in the 2002 Gujarat Riots trilogy by the director, the second one being Vilapangalkkappuram and the third and final one being Bhoomiyude Avakashikal. The narratives of all these films begin on the same day, 28 February 2002, the day after the Godhra train burning in Gujarat. The film was released on November 11 on the Eve of Deepavali.

== Plot ==
Gopinathan Menon, an engineer, is found dead in his flat. Renuka, his fiancée, wants to know the cause of his death. Hence, she decides to investigate the case, unraveling his last days through the perspective of the people he interacted with. Finally, she understands that Gopi committed suicide out of the shame of being alive in such a merciless society.

== Cast ==
- Dileep as Gopinathan Menon a.k.a. Gopi
- Jyothirmayi as Renuka
- Pandiarajan as Kathavarayan
- Vijayaraghavan as Janardhanan
- Cochin Haneefa as S.I. Shaji
- Janardanan as Veerabhadran Nair/Kuttammavan
- Salim Kumar as Renuka's brother-in-law
- Indrans as Thief Thorappan Vasu
- Bindu Panikkar as Lathika, Gopi's sister
- Gita Dey as old Bengali lady
- Ambika Mohan as Renuka's mother
- Nithya Das as Sreedevi
- Stephy Leon as Nazeem
- Shivaji
- Lekshmi Krishnamoorthy as Gopi's mother
- Irshad as Bhadran, Gopi's colleague
- Nisha Sarang as Police Inspector's wife
- Babu Annur
- Manikandan Pattambi
- Vijayan Peringode
- Ashok Vishwanathan
- Kalabhavan Prajod

== Accolades ==
Award	Category	Recipient(s)	Result
Kerala State Film Awards	Kerala State Film Award for Second Best Film	T. V. Chandran (director); Dileep (producer)	Won
Kerala State Film Awards	Kerala State Film Award for Best Screenplay	T. V. Chandran	Won
Kerala State Film Awards	Kerala State Film Award for Best Music Director	M. Jayachandran	Won

== Music ==
Kathavaseshan

Soundtrack album by M. Jayachandran and Isaac Thomas Kottukapally
- Released: 2004
- Genre: Feature film soundtrack
- Length: 11:24
- Languages: Malayalam, Gujarati
- Label: Satyam Audios
External audio
- Audio Jukebox on YouTube

The film's soundtrack album was composed by M. Jayachandran and Isaac Thomas Kottukapally. Isaac composed the film's background score. The Malayalam lyrics on the album was penned by Girish Puthenchery and the Gujarati lyrics by Gauhar Raza.

List of songs
No.	Title	Lyrics	Singer(s)	Length
1.	"Kannu Nattu"	Girish Puthenchery	P. Jayachandran, Vidyadharan	03:50
2.	"Mere Duniya Main"	Gauhar Raza	Shalini Singh	03:56
3.	"Kannu Nattu"	Girish Puthenchery	P. Jayachandran	03:38
Total length:				11:24
