= Ponthan Mada =

- Poster
- Directed by: T. V. Chandran
- Screenplay by: T. V. Chandran
- Story by: C. V. Sreeraman
- Produced by: T. Ravindranath
- Starring: Mammootty; Naseeruddin Shah; Sreejaya; Laboni Sarkar; Janardhanan; Maniyanpilla Raju
- Cinematography: Venu
- Edited by: Venugopal
- Music by: Johnson
- Distributed by: Mac Release
- Release date: 10 March 1994
- Running time: 119 min
- Country: India
- Language: Malayalam

Ponthan Mada is a 1994 Indian Malayalam-language film written and directed by T. V. Chandran. The film stars Mammootty and Naseeruddin Shah. It is based on two short stories, Ponthan Mada and Sheema Thampuran by C. V. Sreeraman. The film won four awards at the National Film Awards including the Best Actor award for Mammotty. It also won the Kerala State Film Award for the best second film. This is the only Malayalam-language film of Naseeruddin Shah. The film was a commercial success.

== Plot ==
Set in the 1940s British India, the film is about the extraordinary, uncanny and touching relationship between the so-called low-caste Ponthan Mada and his colonial landlord Sheema Thampuran, who was expelled to British India from England during his youth for supporting the Irish Republican Army. Crossing the class boundaries, the two communicate through Thampuran's window with Mada hanging from an areca palm tree.

== Cast ==
- Mammootty as Mada
- Sreejaya Nair as Reshmi
- Naseeruddin Shah as Sheema Thampuran
- Laboni Sarkar as Karthu / Kathreena
- Janardhanan as Landlord
- Maniyanpilla Raju as Gopala Kammal
- V. K. Sreeraman as Gopi
- P. K. Abraham as Reshmi's Father
- Mahesh as Rameshan
- Zeenath as Cheriyamma
- Mavelikkara Ponnamma
- Salu Kuttanadu as Karuvang Iriyachan
- Premachandran
- Lakshmi Krishnamoorthy as Thampuran's Mother

== Soundtrack ==
ONV Kurup penned the lyrics.

- "Madam Kondu Adimaranke" - K. S. Chitra

== Awards ==
The film has won the following awards since its release:

1993 National Film Awards (India)

- Golden Lotus Award - Best Director - T. V. Chandran
- Silver Lotus Award - Best Actor - Mammootty
- Silver Lotus Award - Best Music Director - Johnson
- Silver Lotus Award - Best Cinematography - Venu

1994 Kerala State Film Awards (India)

- Won - Kerala State Film Award for Second Best Film - Second Best Film

Other awards

- Muttathu Varkey Award (2016) - T. V. Chandran (for screenplay)
