= Adaminte Makan Abu =

2011 film by Salim Ahamed

- Theatrical release poster
- Directed by: Salim Ahamed
- Written by: Salim Ahamed
- Produced by: Salim Ahamed; Ashraf Bedi
- Starring: Salim Kumar; Zarina Wahab
- Cinematography: Madhu Ambat
- Edited by: Vijay Shankar
- Music by: Ramesh Narayan Isaac Thomas Kottukapally
- Production company: Allens Media
- Distributed by: Kalasangham Films; Laughing Villa; Allens Media Through; Khas; Manjunatha
- Release date: 24 June 2011
- Running time: 101 minutes
- Country: India
- Language: Malayalam
- Budget: ₹1.5 crore

Adaminte Makan Abu (transl. Abu, Son of Adam) is a 2011 Indian Malayalam-language social drama film written, directed and co-produced by Salim Ahamed. It stars Salim Kumar and Zarina Wahab, with Mukesh, Kalabhavan Mani, Suraj Venjarammoodu, and Nedumudi Venu in supporting roles. The cinematography was handled by Madhu Ambat. The film features songs composed by Ramesh Narayan and score by Isaac Thomas Kottukapally. The film tells the story of a poor attar (a kind of perfume) seller Abu (Kumar) whose only remaining wish in life is the Hajj pilgrimage, which he strives hard to fulfill.

Development on Adaminte Makan Abu began roughly a decade before it was released. It was shot digitally over one month, beginning on 7 November 2010. Thrissur and Kozhikode were the major filming locales. Adaminte Makan Abu was released in theatres on 24 June 2011. It received wide critical acclaim, with much praise for its story, direction, cast, cinematography, and score. The film won four National Film Awards: Best Film, Best Actor, Best Cinematography and Best Background Score, and four Kerala State Film Awards for Best Film, Best Actor, Best Screenplay and Best Background Music. It was sent as India's official entry for the Best Foreign Language Film for the Academy Awards in 2011 but was not nominated.

== Plot ==
Abu and Aishumma are an elderly Moplah Muslim couple living in Kerala's Malabar region. Their aspiration is to go for Hajj, the pilgrimage to Mecca, and they sacrifice to achieve this aim. He scrimps and saves to achieve his dream of going to Mecca. Their son Sattar has migrated to the Middle East (as a part of the Kerala Gulf boom) with his family and has virtually discarded his parents. Now in their late 70s, the couple save money so they can attend Hajj that year.

Abu sells attar (a perfume obtained from flowers), religious books and Unani medicines that nobody seems to want. Aishumma breeds cattle and chickens, helping her husband realise their shared dream. Abu feels as outdated and discarded by a fast-changing world as the traditional products that he sells.

A school teacher, Abu's friend, comes to his aid at his time of need. Hyder, a local teashop owner also empathises with Abu who in turn is frequently given genuine advice by a mysterious saint known simply as "Ustad". Good-natured people try to help Abu by offering to lend him the amount but, as this goes against the accepted Islamic practices, he refuses to take anything.

With advancing years, Abu's desperation grows. Finally, in frustration and distress, he sells his cow and an old jackfruit tree. Abu is helped by the manager of a travel agency to get flight tickets and other documents for his journey. A policeman initially tries to reject Abu's passport application, but once he gets his usual bribe he becomes quite helpful. The couple begins their preparations which include attending the Hajj preparation classes conducted by the travel agency, being vaccinated for meningococcal meningitis and buying new Ihram clothing. Abu pays off even the smallest of his old debts as part of the preparations and travels miles to seek forgiveness from Sulaiman, a previous neighbour with whom he once fought.

When the passports and the tickets are ready and a bus journey away in Kozhikode, the sawmill owner, while handing over the money for Abu's tree, says that its wood turned out to be rotten and useless. He insists that Abu take the money, however, since his cause is noble. Abu refuses it, saying that it wouldn't be halal and hence could anger ALLAH. When he is sure that he cannot fulfill his dream, Abu reaches another conclusion — that the tree too had life, and several lives must have died when he cut the tree in front of his house. Abu conjectures that maybe one of the reasons for his not being able to go on the journey. On the dawn of the Hajj, Abu tells his wife that they will go the next year; he plants a new jackfruit sapling and is seen going to the mosque to pray on the morning of Hajj.

== Cast ==
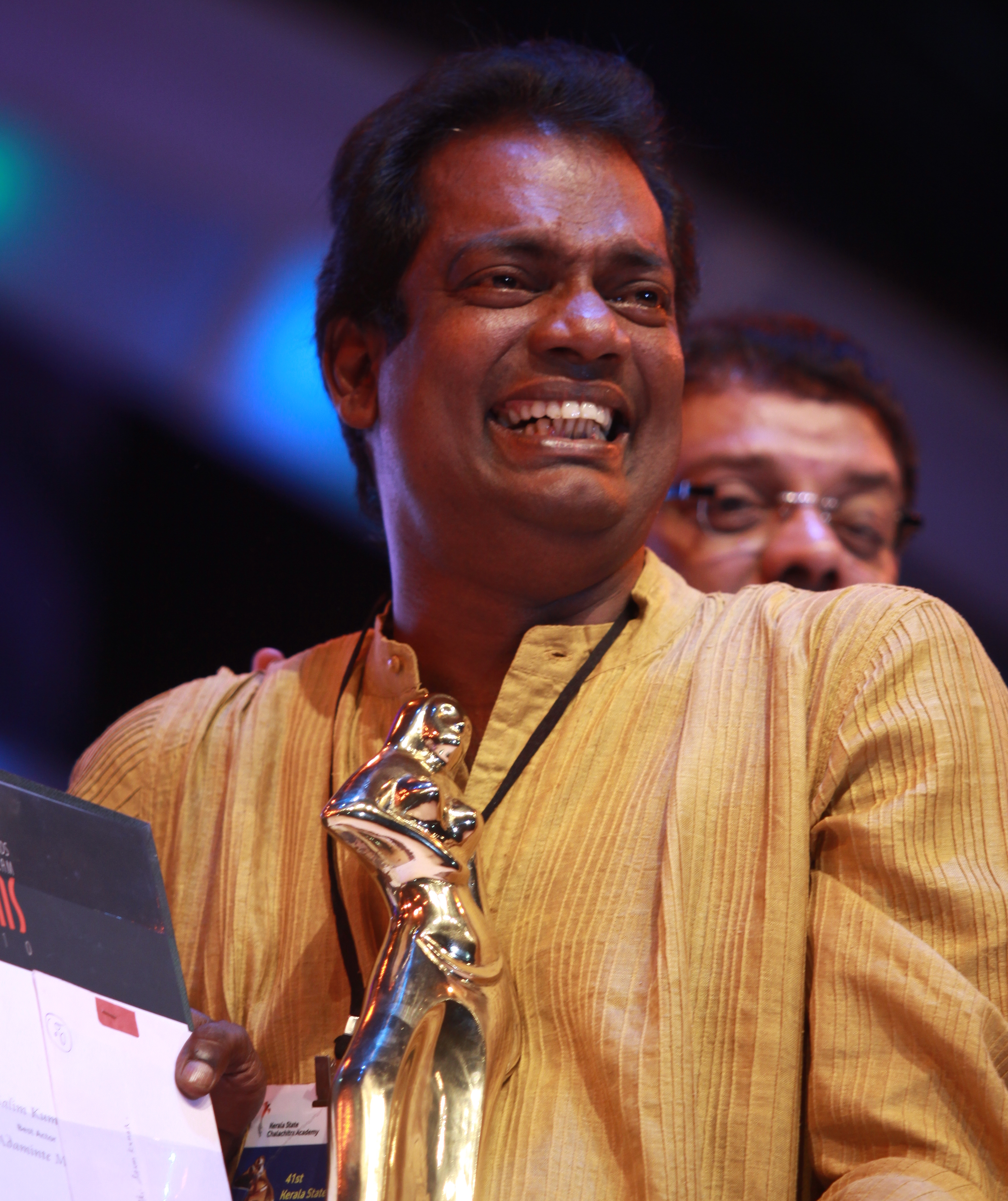
Kumar received critical acclaim for his performance as Abu and went on to win the National Film Award for Best Actor and the Kerala State Film Award for Best Actor.

- Salim Kumar as Abu
- Zarina Wahab as Aishumma
- Adarsh Anto as sathar
- Mukesh as Ashraf
- Kalabhavan Mani as Johnson
- Thampi Antony as Usthad
- Suraj Venjarammoodu as Hyder
- Nedumudi Venu as Govindan Master
- T. S. Raju as Maliyekkal Assainar Haji
- Jaffar Idukki as Photographer
- Sasi Kalinga as Kabeer
- M. R. Gopakumar as Sulaiman
- Ambika Mohan as Nalini
- Nisha Sarangi as Rabiya
- Murali as Ameer
- Mohamed Mayanad as Kayiti
- Vinod Kovoor as Moideen
- Sasidharan Mattanur as Mammunji

== Production ==
=== Development ===
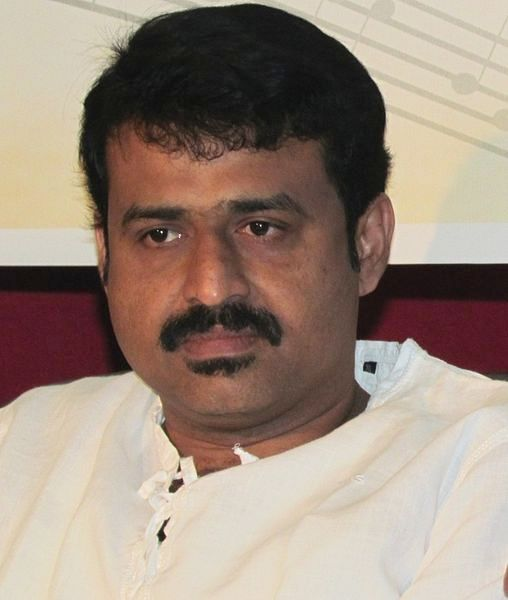
Adaminte Makan Abu was Salim Ahamed's debut feature. He had the story in his mind for more than ten years.

Development on the film began roughly a decade before it was released. Adaminte Makan Abu marks the directorial debut of Salim Ahamed, who says that he had entertained the story in his mind for many years. Upon graduating from college in the early 2000s, Ahamed dreamed of joining the film industry but found it hard to break into and ended up a travel consultant. It was the stories he heard and the people he met during this time that sowed the seeds for Adaminte Makan Abu. The film's protagonists were inspired by a real-life couple. Ahamed says that he was at the Jeddah airport, trying to solve the problem of too much baggage (thanks to many gifts for family back home), when he met a couple coming back "after performing Umra". They had scrounged, lived simply, and saved their money in hopes of going on Hajj but "settled for Umra fearing they would never make it to the Hajj". He made friends with them and helped them with flight mishaps and hotel stays. "During this period, I learnt a great deal about their undying spirit, life and the virtues they possessed".

The central character Abu was significantly inspired by a man named Aboottikka in Ahamed's home village who looked and behaved a lot like the central character. In Ahamed's own words, the old couple he had met at the Umrah pilgrimage became Aboottikka and that in turn turned out to be Adaminte Makan Abu. Ahamed said that he had written three basic plots during his college days. One was based in a local school in Kerala, one was a thriller, and the third was the story of Abu. He decided to film Adaminte Makan Abu since a number of people liked the story line; moreover, he wanted his first film to have a message and to be impressive. It took only a month for Ahamed to prepare the final script. The biggest challenge was to find a producer/financier. Nobody was prepared to finance a non-commercial film like this one, so he started saving up his television pay cheques – but they were not enough. Finally, he had to approach a friend and producer, Ashraf Bedi, to produce this film. Ashraf Bedi was one of the producer of the film "shamboo" in which salim ahamed was a script writer. Salim Ahamed used to discuss the story with Ashraf Bedi during the shooting of the film "shamboo". Ashraf bedi immediately agreed to produce the film jointly with Salim Ahamed as he was already familiar with the story.

=== Casting ===
Both Ashraf Bedi And Salim Ahamed did considerable research before they finalised the cast and crew. They decided to take the risk of filming with a serious theme when they secured Salim Kumar in the lead, although the actor did not have the glamour of a conventional hero. They were confident that the risk would be minimal compared to the final result's worth. On the sets of the 2010 film Best Actor Ahamed met the actor to convince him to play the role. Ahamed says that Kumar was an obvious choice because of his popularity and his versatility. It was Kumar's outstanding performance (as a son who is forced to abandon his aged mother) in Bridge, one of the ten films in the Kerala Cafe anthology, that made Salim Ahamed choose the actor for the role. Kumar was initially reluctant to accept the role, since he was unsure about carrying the film as the star. Ahamed, however, was confident, and assured Kumar that the film would have the top technicians in the field: He brought in the cinematography veteran Madhu Ambat, and Issac Thomas Kottukapally to handle the music. Kumar, who is generally known for slapstick comedy roles, did not do any preparation for his role and accepted no payment for his participation. Zarina Wahab, who had made a comeback in Malayalam films with Calendar, plays the lead female role in the film. According to Ahamed, she was cast because she had the face of a Malabar Muslim.

Aside from Kumar and Wahab, the film also stars several other actors like Kalabhavan Mani, Mukesh, Suraj Venjarammoodu, Nedumudi Venu and Jaffer Idukki in key roles. Ahamed says that he wanted to work with the industry's best people from the beginning and that their liking for the subject made this (relatively) easy. Madhu Ambat was doing a Malayalam film after a gap of nearly 12 years.

=== Filming ===
Pattanam Rasheed did makeup for all the actors. The artificial beard he used initially didn't match Kumar's skin tone so he imported a matching beard from Mumbai, spending his own money. Shooting began on 7 November 2010 and took place in Thrissur and Kozhikode in Kerala. Major sections were filmed from a house in Athani in Thrissur. The set was made by debuting art director Jyothish on a shoestring of ₹2 lakh (US$2,076.90).

The film was shot digitally using an Arriflex D-21 camera. Cinematographer Madhu Ambat recalls that he had planned to use 16 mm film to further reduce costs but used 35 mm film instead since he wanted many long shots, which he says were helpful in showing the feeling of loneliness. Ambat also experimented with lighting, and an unusual lighting pattern which closely matched the themes and motifs of the movie was chosen.

The total budget was around ₹1.5 crore (US$155,763.75). To complete Adaminte Makan Abu, Ahamed had to spend every rupee raised from what he had saved up over the years working on scripts for television serials and assisting directors. However the money saved was not sufficient to produce the film. Ahamed recalls that when not a soul was ready to finance or produce the film he approached his friend and producer Ashraf Bedi (co- producer of the movie "Shamboo" which Ahamed had scripted) who immediately agreed to produce the film jointly. It was from this stage the movie production picked up momentum, and principal production was completed in a mere 31 days. To enhance its technical quality, Academy Award-winning sound designer Resul Pookutty redesigned and remixed the sound before the official screening for the academy members in Los Angeles on 19 November. A group of first-class technicians also came forward to revamp the film without payment. Graphics were handled by Fies Thoppil.

== Themes ==
The film conveys a universal theme along with many aspects of human relationship beyond caste and religion. It is noted for projecting human values and inter-group harmony. These motifs are particularly evident during the scenes in which the villagers coming for Abu's help include a Christian merchant (Johnson, played by Kalabhavan Mani) and a Hindu school teacher (played by Nedumudi Venu). With a simple plot, Adaminte Makan Abu also conveys the message of environmental conservation. Man's relationship with nature and his fellow creatures is represented by a jackfruit tree and a domestic cow, which Abu sells with a heavy heart for money to go on the pilgrimage. We see Abu cursing himself for cutting the tree, thereby destroying the habitat of innumerable living things.

In the original theatrical version, there is a scene in which doubting shopkeepers muse that Abu must have got a cheque from Osama bin Laden to pay for the trip. Several critics have observed that this mentioning is intentionally done to make it a modern Muslim film. The character of Ustad, the village oracle with powers of divine communion, also makes it a more Muslim film. Notably, Adaminte Makan Abu does not have any truly negative characters. Sathar, Abu's and Aishumma's only son (who abandons his aged parents), is the only character with any negative aspects. This mention depicts the problems faced by the destitute senior citizens in India, thus helping make Adaminte Makan Abu a socially caring film. Globalisation is also a major concern; the film depicts the way globalisation has touched contemporary Kerala: Many of its men have gone to Dubai or other Gulf states for work and, even though they send money back, their absence has changed the region immeasurably.

Some critics have felt that the characters as well as the setting are too idealistic. Noted critic S. Anandan observes that the modern-day village (not far from a busy town) is "idyllic" with "harmonious" residents but complains that so idealistic a view of village life is inappropriate: "the societal life in the village, reminiscent of rural Kerala in the 1980s with its crop of do-gooders and mystics, is too ideal to be true in current times. But then, Salim Ahmed is out to picture life in a Basheerian habitat, where inter-religious" people are "gleeful" to share the earth with "pagan" living things. Salim Ahamed replies that, while the characters are idealistic, such people do exist; someone like Abu's honesty and goodness to others helps him receive goodness from others.

== Music ==
Adaminte Makan Abu

Soundtrack album by Ramesh Narayan
- Released: 2011
- Genre: Feature film soundtrack
- Length: 23:22
- Label: Manorama Music

Ramesh Narayan chronology
Makaramanju (2011)	Adaminte Makan Abu (2011)

The film features an original score by Isaac Thomas Kottukapally. Kottukapally did not want to confine the music to a particular region alone, as the subject and emotions are universal. As the story is about going on Hajj, he used notes from Arabic scales but keeping it to the minimum until the Hajj theme comes on-screen and he used Arabic instruments like the oud and the mandolin, santoor, and sarod; these latter are close to the oud. Kottukapally also used the tabla, flute, drums from North Kerala and also African drums. Contrary to the usual practice in Malayalam films, the film used minimalist music: Kottukapally kept a lot of silence in Adaminte Makan Abu and used aarohana and avarohana before and after the silence.

The soundtrack to Adaminte Makan Abu features songs composed by Ramesh Narayan with lyrics by Rafeeque Ahammed. Released on Manorama Music, the soundtrack featured vocals by Shankar Mahadevan, Ramesh Narayan, Hariharan, Sujatha, Madhusree Narayan and Srinivas. It received generally positive reviews: T. Sudheesh of the City Journal labelling the songs "meaningful and heart rending." Keerthy Ramachandran of the Deccan Chronicle said that the music is "excellent" and "in tune with the" movie's mood, and that while the other singers have created beautiful music, Makka Madheena "triumphs" in carrying "the heart of the theme."

=== Track listing ===
No.	Title	Singer(s)	Length
1.	"Makkah Madeenathil"	Shankar Mahadevan, Ramesh Narayan	5:32
2.	"Kinavinte Minarathil"	Hariharan	3:40
3.	"Mutholakunnathe"	Sujatha	5:16
4.	"Kinavinte Minarathil"	Madhusree Narayan	3:40
5.	"Mutholakunnathe"	Srinivas	5:14
Total length:			23:22

== Release ==
=== Festival screenings ===
The film had its European premiere on 13 October 2011 at the 55th BFI London Film Festival, where it was screened in the "World Cinema" category. Its national premiere was on 18 October 2011 at the MAMI Mumbai Film Festival, where it was screened in the "Indian Frame" category. In his review for Firstpost.com, critic Vikram Phukan selected Adaminte Makan Abu as one of the ten best films screened at the Mumbai festival. It had its North American premiere on 9 November 2011 at the 8th South Asian International Film Festival (SAIFF), where it was featured on the opening night.

Adaminte Makan Abu was one of the seven Malayalam films selected to be screened at the Indian Panorama section of International Film Festival of India and won the Special Jury Award for Best Film. The chairman of the IFFI Jury and eminent Malayalam filmmaker Adoor Gopalakrishnan said the jury selected Adaminte Makan Abu for the award for its purity of vision in depicting the ideals of religion, nature and humanness.

Adaminte Makan Abu was the only Malayalam film selected to be screened at the international competition section of the 16th International Film Festival of Kerala (IFFK) but was later withdrawn because according to the rules of this festival, a film that has taken part in the competition section of any international festival in India cannot be included in its competition section. The film was, however, screened in the "Malayalam Cinema Today" section of the festival. It was also screened at the 23rd Palm Springs International Film Festival (PSIFF) — often considered the run-up to the Academy Awards — in January 2012 and at the Cinema of Salvation Competition section of the 30th Fajr International Film Festival.

Salim Kumar won the award for Best Actor at the 11th Imagineindia International Film Festival held in Madrid. It was one of four Indian films to be screened at the 2012 Seattle International Film Festival (SIFF), held in Washington. The film won the award for Best Script and the Prize of the Guild of Film Critics and Film scholars of Russia at the 8th Kazan International Festival of Muslim Cinema (Golden Minbar International Film Festival) held in Russia.

Adaminte Makan Abu was an official selection for the 5th Indo-German Film Festival, 17th Kolkata Film Festival, 9th Chennai International Film Festival, 4th Bengaluru International Film Festival, 10th Pune International Film Festival, 35th Portland International Film Festival, Chicago South Asian Film Festival, 4th Cine ASA (Art Society Assam) Guwahati International Film Festival, 10th Los Angeles Indian Film Festival, 5th Asian Consuls General Club (ACGC) Film Festival held in Jeddah, 14th London Asian Film Festival, first Washington DC South Asian Film Festival, first Ladakh International Film Festival, 5th Stuttgart Indian Film Festival in Germany, the second The Hague Indian Film Festival in Netherlands, the Indian Film Festival held at Puducherry in India, Beyond Bollywood: 18th South Asian Film Festival held at Orlando, and 12th River to River Florence Indian Film Festival.

=== Theatrical release ===
After the shooting and editing were wrapped, Adaminte Makan Abu was sent to the Censor Board in Mumbai and from there copies were directly sent to the national and state award committees. In late May, the film's co-producer Ashraf Bedi approached the court alleging that he was cheated by Ahamed who did not mention him as a co-producer when the entry papers were submitted for the National Awards. The film was described as produced by Salim Ahamed alone. Consequently, the court held the film's screening and distribution till 10 June.Subsequently, salim Ahamed confessed to the court and rectified the papers submitted to the National awards by including Ashraf bedi and Salim Ahamed as co-producers. The film was then released for screening and distribution. The producers Salim Ahamed and Ashraf Bedi was approached by four major distributors – Playhouse, Khas, Kalasangham Films and Vaishaka – for the distribution rights. Salim Kumar decided to distribute the film himself, under his newly formed company Laughing Villa, along with Allens Media Release through Kalasangham Films, Khas and Manjunatha. The film was released in 70 theatres in Kerala on 24 June 2011 with previews held in Chennai, Ernakulam and Kannur. A historical film, Bombay March 12, starring Mammootty was slated for release on the same date but was postponed following a request from Mammootty, who wanted his to avoid his film clashing with Adaminte Makan Abu.

=== Home media ===
The film's home video rights were bought by Saina Videos. DVDs were released in September 2011 and reportedly had an overwhelming demand. This unexpected response said to be from the film's early withdrawal from theatres. Media had already reported that many viewers were not able to watch Adaminte Makan Abu in theatres.

The film's television premier was on 7 November 2011 on Mazhavil Manorama, coinciding with the festival of Bakrid.

=== Accusations of plagiarism ===
A controversy regarding the film's plot originated when the filmmaker Abbas Kalathod claimed that the story was taken from his short film Maruppacha, released eight years earlier. "With the characters of Maruppacha given an elderly treatment and embellishing the story with exaggeration, Adaminte Makan Abu was made," he claimed. Kalathod says that the 21-minute Maruppacha for which he had written the story, script and dialogue, narrate "a story of Bappu, a youth who spares a little of his day's earning in preparation for the Hajj. He hands over the entire money to his neighbour, who nourishes such a wish. In Qabalah, Abdullah dreams of a heavenly voice which says the God has accepted only Bappu's Haj. On his return, Abdullah goes in search of Bappu. The story ends when after a prolonged wandering they meet, and Abdullah tells the entire story to Bappu." Salim Kumar reacted, calling the allegations ridiculous. He said, "Adaminte Makan Abu is yet to be released. Without watching the film, the man who levelled the allegations came to the conclusion that its story is plagiarised. I came across the story that he claimed to be similar to that of Adaminte Makan Abu. The story penned by him bears resemblance to that of the film Kuttikkuppayam."

A similar story was narrated by the 8th-century Sufi saint Ibrahim ibn Adham. In the story, it is a shoesmith who dreams of going for the Hajj pilgrimage.

== Reception ==
=== Critical reception ===
The film portrays Islam in its true light, by strongly conveying the message of oneness of all living beings.

— Pratibha Patil, Hon. President of India

The film met with mostly acclaim from critics. Mahmood Kooria has edited a volume in Malayalam compiling and collecting various studies and reviews on Adaminte Makan Abu. The volume titled Adaminte Makan Abu: Drisyadarsanangalile Kaalavum Desavum (Abu, Son of Adam: Time and Space in Visual Vision) is published by Mathrubhumi Books, a leading publishing group in Kerala. Gautaman Bhaskaran of The Hindustan Times rated the movie three-out-of-five stars, writing that it portrays an unrealistically ideal situation (except for the couple's son) and "plays out like a placid stream", although it is "a rare study in restraint". About the cinematography, the reviewer says that some shots are extraordinarily beautiful and convey emotions like gloom and loneliness. The critic praises Kottukappally's background score, saying that it helps create the proper mood – one that goes back and forth from depression to happiness and hope. He labelled the actors' performances "marvellous", with the leads receiving particular praise. A critic from EasternKicks rated it five-out-of-five stars and wrote that it is a simple story, with beautiful filming and acting, and "a rare insight into Muslim life in Kerala". The official website of the Institute of Contemporary Arts called Adaminte Makan Abu a story told gently of "irrepressible hope" and true friendship.

Guy Lodge of Variety magazine stated that the story is told clearly and compassionately, but with a lack of "humour or grit", and thus lacking overt conflict because "Abu's gentle decency sees him escape or mollify one practical or personal opponent after another." The critic praised Ambat's cinematography but criticised Kumar's performance, saying he was obviously committed to the role but was "over-deliberate". J. Hurtado of Canadian film website Twitch Film called it "a peaceful, contemplative" one and stated that it was regenerative to the spirit. Lisa Tsering of The Hollywood Reporter said that, while the film was well-acted and the scenery in it was impressive, it was unlikely to do well outside of a specialised "art house" audience. Paresh C. Palicha of Mumbai-based Internet provider Rediff.com gave it a very positive review and praised it as "simple and beautiful". The review mostly praised the performances, direction and story, but gave it three-over-five stars because of emotional manipulation and an overly-positive view of a travel agency. In Deccan Chronicle newspaper, Keerthy Ramachandran gave a five-star rating, writing the film should receive honours in "the history of Malayalam cinema". S. Anandan of The Hindu published a positive review, saying that the film was hopeful for Malayalam cinema (currently, according to the review, at its low point), due to its portrayal "of a devout old man's pursuit of spiritual bliss". The critic labelled the setting, however, as (overly) "idyllic" and idealistic and that Ahamed wants to show "a Basheerian habitat, where inter-religious individuals" happily live together with other "pagan" beings.

T. Sudheesh of the Thrissur City Journal concluded his review by saying that it is beautiful, "engaging and entertaining" and that "the film truly deserves the national award", being very worth watching. Veeyen of Indian online portal Nowrunning.com highly praised the film, saying that its meticulous pacing and magnificent staging creates a sense of hope that should help humanity "in these testing times" though not explaining why he gave only three out of five stars. A reviewer from the Chennai-based Internet provider Sify.com gave a five-star rating, saying it should make Malayalam proud and would "find its place among the most powerful films ever made in Malayalam." A reviewer from the online portal Oneindia.in said that Ahamed took a simple story and "created a masterpiece". Bruce Fessier of The Desert Sun newspaper wrote that the film "defines piousness" with "a sweet, gentle tale", with a couple who accept "every outcome as God's will, never showing a trace of bitterness, except for their disappointment in their son." He felt it did not adequately explain the family division, but that this was "irrelevant" to the basic point, namely that piousness and faith in the ultimate future meant that "your disappointment in the here and now will never overwhelm." He rated Adaminte Makan Abu seven out of five and particularly praised the leads saying that he had difficulty telling they were acting. After watching the film, famous orator and writer Sukumar Azhikode said that it "shows us how a Malayalam film should be." He praised Salim Kumar's performance, like Bruce Fessier saying that it was difficult to tell that Kumar was acting, not simply living as Abu.

Adaminte Makan Abu received a few negative reviews as well. For instance, Daniel Green from Cine-Vue.com gave 2 out of 5 stars, writing that it gave little "insight into the region's Muslim community" and was "neither superior, compelling nor innovative".

=== Box office ===
Although the film received positive reviews from almost all corners, its revenues in the Kerala box-office were only average. Many could not watch Adaminte Makan Abu from theatres since it was withdrawn a few days after the release. According to Salim Kumar, the box-office revenues were not good in most areas, with the Muslim-dominated Malabar region being an exception.

== 2012 Academy Awards Best Foreign Film submission ==
Adaminte Makan Abu was India's official entry to be considered for nomination in the Best Foreign Film category for the 84th Academy Awards. It was chosen over 15 others by the Film Federation of India (FFI) to represent the country for the award. Adaminte Makan Abu is the second Malayalam film (the first one being Guru) to be submitted for the Oscars. Salim Ahamed was burdened heavily with promoting it in the United States for the Oscar jury. According to Ahamed, promotional events such as showing the film in the US (including at least six showings for the jury members) would be necessary to get support for the nomination. Ahamed also stated that the nomination would not directly result in monetary rewards, so nobody would loan him money for the purpose. Lobbying began in October 2011. In an interview, Ahamed said that people abroad, particularly in the Gulf region, were of assistance. There was not any support from the government or Malayalam film industry (or even contacts from them). Meanwhile, many political parties from Kerala urged the government to help raise funds for the film. In reply, the Kerala Chief Minister, Oommen Chandy, said that Malayalam film industry had to make a unanimous demand for the state government to extend help to the makers of Adaminte Makan Abu, India's official entry to the Oscars. Salim Ahamed managed to jumpstart his Academy Awards campaign with a screening to a packed audience in the Charlie Chaplin screening room of Raleigh Studios in Los Angeles in early December 2011. However, in January 2012 the film did not make the final shortlist.

== Accolades ==
Adaminte Makan Abu received honours for its music, cinematography and writing, as well as for Salim Kumar's performance. It was listed as one of the top-rated Malayalam films of the year by magazines and websites including Rediff, Sify and Nowrunning. Salim Ahamed was chosen as the "Director of the Year 2011" by leading Malayalam daily Deepika.

Academy Awards (2012)

- Indian submission for Academy Award for Best Foreign Language Film

Amrita-FEFKA Film Awards (2011)

- Special Jury Award – Salim Kumar

Asiavision Movie Awards (2011)

- Best Outstanding Indian Film – Ashraf Bedi & Salim Ahamed
- Best Debut Director – Salim Ahamed
- Best Actor – Salim Kumar

Filmfare Awards South (2012)

- Won, Best Actor – Salim Kumar
- Nominated, Best Film

Imagineindia International Film Festival (2012)

- Best Actor – Salim Kumar

International Film Festival of Kerala (2011)

- NETPAC Award for Best Malayalam Film – Ashraf Bedi & Salim Ahamed
- FIPRESCI Award for Best Malayalam Film – AShraf Bedi & Salim Ahamed
- Hassankutty Award for Best Indian Debut Director – Salim Ahamed

International Film Festival of India (2011)

- Special Jury Award for Best Film (Silver Peacock)

Jaihind TV Film Awards (2011)

- Best Actor – Salim Kumar

Kazan International Festival of Muslim Cinema (2012)

- The Best Feature Film Scenario – Salim Ahamed
- The Prize of the Guild of Film Critics and Film scholars of Russia

Kerala Film Critics Association Awards (2011)

- Special Jury Award – Salim Kumar

Kerala State Film Awards (2011)

- Best Actor – Salim Kumar
- Best Background Music – Isaac Thomas Kottukapally
- Best Film- Ashraf Bedi & salim Ahamed
- Best Screenplay – Salim Ahamed

Nana Film Awards (2011)

- Best Lyricist – Rafeeque Ahamed

National Film Awards (2011)

- Best Actor – Salim Kumar
- Best Cinematography – Madhu Ambat
- Best Feature Film – Ashraf Bedi & Salim Ahamed
- Best Music Direction (Background Score) – Isaac Thomas Kottukapally

South Indian International Movie Awards (2012)

- Actor – Special appreciation – Salim Kumar
- Best Debutant Director – Salim Ahamed

Thikkurissy Foundation Awards (2012)

- Best Film
- Best Actor – Salim Kumar
- Best Director – Salim Ahamed

Vellinakshatram Film Awards (2011)

- Special Award – Salim Ahamed
- Special Award – Salim Kumar

Other awards

- 2012: Shihab Thangal Cultural Award – Salim Ahamed

== Plan for remake ==
In late May 2011, the Malayalam daily Madhyamam reported that Mumbai-based film company Mega Productions had approached Salim Ahamed with the idea of remaking Adaminte Makan Abu in Hindi. Discussions were supposed to be held in early June, before the theatrical release of the original. Later, reports came that Karan Johar's Dharma Productions had approached Ahamed to buy the rights. Johar had already heard about the movie from Zarina Wahab. According to the reports, Karan Johar was to direct with Shahrukh Khan in the role of Abu with Salim Ahamed also attached.

Johar, however, later categorically denied any inclination to remake the film through his Twitter post, which stated among other things "On record ... am NOT planning the remake of the acclaimed malyalam film". However, Ahamed later revealed that Dharma Productions (Karan's company) had contacted him about buying the rights for the movie but did not get back to him "after the initial talks." Salim Ahamed discussed it with J. P. Dutta, who was eager to remake the hit in Hindi, but this did not work out. In a November 2011 interview, Kumar said that a plan exists "to remake the film in four major Indian languages," but Salim Ahamed has said that he doesn't want to give anyone the rights.

== See also ==
- List of Islamic films
- List of submissions to the 84th Academy Awards for Best Foreign Language Film
- List of Indian submissions for the Academy Award for Best Foreign Language Film
- Le Grand Voyage, a 2004 French film which portrays the relationship between father and son as both embark on a religious pilgrimage trip.
