= Hemavin Kadhalargal =

- Directed by: T. V. Chandran
- Produced by: Gangadharan D Krishnan Kutty
- Starring: Delhi Ganesh; Anuradha; Shanthi Krishna
- Music by: Raveendran
- Release date: 27 December 1985
- Country: India
- Language: Tamil

Hemavin Kadhalargal (transl. Hema's lovers) is a 1985 Indian Tamil-language film directed by T. V. Chandran. It is Chandran's first widely released film, first Tamil film and overall, second film. Actress Anuradha made her debut with this film. It was released on 27 December 1985.

== Cast ==
- Delhi Ganesh
- Anuradha
- Shanthi Krishna
- J. R. Balaiah
- Kumar
- M. S. Moorthy
- R. K. Raman
- Ramki
- Sudheesh
- Vijai Mohan
- Sabitha Anand
- Sujatha Rao

== Soundtrack ==
Soundtrack was composed by Raveendran, with lyrics by Kavin Mugil.

Track listing
No.	Title	Singer(s)	Length
1.	"Paarvai Theril Pogum"	S. P. Balasubrahmanyam
2.	"Kalai Poove"	S. Janaki

== Reception ==
Jayamanmadhan (a duo) of Kalki praised Anuradha's performance and music but criticised the film for portraying men as womanisers and drunkards. They concluded the review saying everyone in the film is normal, but very calm, between one sentence and another, one can go to the central station and make a reservation for the Delhi train.
