= Ormakalundayirikkanam =

- Directed by: T. V. Chandran
- Written by: T. V. Chandran
- Produced by: Salam Karassery
- Starring: Mammootty; Master Nithin; Bharath Gopi; Priyambada Ray; Nedumudi Venu; Cuckoo Parameswaran; Sreenivasan
- Cinematography: Venu
- Edited by: Venugopal
- Music by: Johnson
- Production company: Navadhara Movie Makers
- Release date: 29 September 1995
- Running time: 91 minutes
- Country: India
- Language: Malayalam

Ormakalundayirikkanam (English: Should have memories) is a 1995 Indian Malayalam-language political drama film directed by T. V. Chandran. Starring Mammootty, Master Nithin, Bharath Gopi, Priyambada Ray, Nedumudi Venu, Cuckoo Parameswaran and Sreenivasan, the film portrays the rise of the Communists to power in 1957 and the infamous Vimochana Samaram (Liberation Struggle) of 1959.

Film critic Kozhikodan included the film on his list of the 10 best Malayalam movies of all time.

== Cast ==
- Mammootty as Tailor Bhaskaran (Bhasi)
- Master Nithin as Jayan
- Bharath Gopi as Tharakan
- Priyanka as Bhasakaran's Wife
- Nedumudi Venu as Nambiar, Jayan's father
- Mamukkoya as Police constable
- Cuckoo Parameswaran
- Sreenivasan as Barber Naanu
- M. G. Soman as Chattampi Velayudhan
- Bindu Panicker
- V. K. Sreeraman as Tea Shoper
- Sreejaya

== Reception ==
Reviewing the film at the Indian Panorama section of the International Film Festival of India, S. R. Ashok Kumar of The Hindu wrote that "Director T. V. Chandran shows us how everyday life and the general atmosphere has been recked by communal passions, political rivalry and organised violence".

== Awards ==
- National Film Award for Best Feature Film in Malayalam - T. V. Chandran and Salam Karassery
- Kerala State Film Award for Best Child Artist - Master Nithin
- Kerala State Film Award (Special Jury Award) - T. V. Chandran
