= Abhirami Ajai =

Indian playback singer

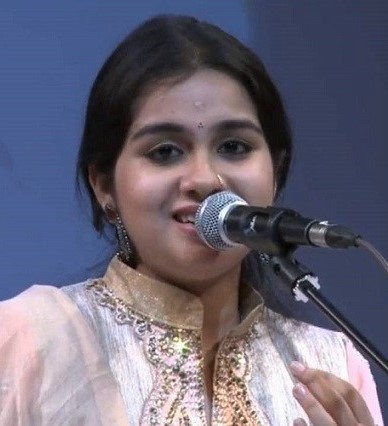

Background information
- Born: 1997 (age 28–29); Kerala, India
- Occupation: Playback Singer
- Years active: 2012–present

Abhirami Ajai is an Indian playback singer. She is a graduate of St. Teresa's College, Ernakulam. She started her career by singing her first song "Thottu Thottu" in the film Diamond Necklace.

== Career ==
Abhirami at the age of 13 got a chance to work with Vidyasagar for the film Diamond Necklace. The song was a hit. Later Abhirami worked with Vidyasagar, Ouseppachan, and Gopi Sunder.

== Discography ==
=== 2012 ===
Film	Song	Composer(s)	Lyricist(s)	Co-artist(s)
Diamond Necklace	"Thottu Thottu Thottu Nokkamo"	Vidyasagar	Rafeeq Ahammed	Najim Arshad
Ayalum Njanum Thammil	"Azhalinte Azhangalil Avan Manju" (female version)	Ouseppachan	Vayalar Sarathchandra Varma	

=== 2013 ===
Film	Song	Composer(s)	Lyricist(s)	Co-artist(s)
Oru Indian Pranayakatha	"Omanakomala Thamarapoove"	Vidyasagar	Rafeeq Ahammed	Najim Arshad
Geethanjali	"Madhumathipoo"	Vidyasagar	O. N. V. Kurup	Sreevardhini, Ajmal

=== 2014 ===
Film	Song	Composer(s)	Lyricist(s)	Co-artist(s)
My Life Partner	"Dasharadha Raama"	Girish Surya Narayanan	Babu S Kumar	

=== 2016 ===
Film	Song	Composer(s)	Lyricist(s)	Co-artist(s)
Thoppil Joppan	"Poovithalay Njan Nadha"	Vidyasagar	Rafeeq Ahammed	
Dooram	"Parayam Ini Njan"	Mohammed Riswan	Rafeeq Ahammed	Vijay Yesudas

=== 2017 ===
Film	Song	Composer(s)	Lyricist(s)	Co-artist(s)
Crossroad	"Naama Sametham"	M. Jayachandran	M. R. Jayageetha	M. Jayachandran

=== 2019 ===
Film	Song	Composer(s)	Lyricist(s)	Co-artist(s)
Neeyum Njanum	"Koottilay"	Vinu Thomas	Dr. Rajesh	
