= Kerala State Film Award for Second Best Film =

Annual Indian film award

- State award for contributions to Malayalam cinema
- Awarded for: Second best film in Malayalam cinema
- Sponsored by: Kerala State Chalachitra Academy
- Reward: ₹300,000 (US$3,200)
- First award: 1970
- Final award: 2024
- Most recent winner: Feminichi Fathima
- Website: keralafilm.com

The Kerala State Film Award for Second Best Film is presented annually at the Kerala State Film Awards of India to the second best film in Malayalam cinema. The awards are managed directly by the Kerala State Chalachitra Academy under the Department of Cultural Affairs of the Government of Kerala.

== Winners ==
Year	Film	Director	Producer	Ref.
1970	Priya	Madhu	N. P. Abu	
1971	Sindooracheppu	Madhu	Yusuf Ali Kechery	
1972	Chembarathi	P. N. Menon	S. K. Nair	
1973	Gayathri	P. N. Menon	Sreeram Pictures	
1974	Chattakari	K. S. Sethumadhavan	M. O. Joseph	
1975	Kabani Nadi Chuvannappol	P. A. Backer	V. K. Pavithran	
1976	Missi	Thoppil Bhasi	M. O. Joseph	
1977	Chuvanna Vithukal	P. A. Backer	Salam Karassery	
1978	Thampu	G. Aravindan	K. Ravindran Nair	
1979	Peruvazhiyambalam	Padmarajan	Prem Prakash	
1980	Chamaram	Bharathan	Navodaya Appachan	
1981	Vida Parayum Munpe	Mohan	Innocent	
1982	Ormakkayi	Bharathan	Innocent, David Kachappilly	
1983	Adaminte Vaariyellu	K. G. George	Vincent Chittilappally	
1984	Aalkkoottathil Thaniye	I. V. Sasi	Raju Mathew	
1985	Irakal	K. G. George	Sukumaran	
1986	Uppu	V. K. Pavithran	K. M. A. Rahim	
1987	Theertham	Mohan	G. P. Vijayakumar, G. Jayakumar	
1988	Piravi	Shaji N. Karun	S. Jayachandran Nair	
1989	Alicinte Anveshanam	T. V. Chandran	T. V. Chandran	
1990	Aprahnam	M. P. Sukumaran Nair	M. P. Sukumaran Nair	
1991	Bharatham	Sibi Malayil	Mohanlal	
1992	Kudumbasammetham	Jayaraj	Mumtas Basheer	
1993	Ponthan Mada	T. V. Chandran	T. Ravindranath	
1994	Swaham	Shaji N. Karun	S. Jayachandran Nair	
1995	Kalapani	Priyadarshan	Mohanlal	
1996	Kanakkinavu	Sibi Malayil	P. V. Gangadharan	
1997	Poothiruvathira Ravil	V. R. Gopinath	NFDC	
1998	Garshom	P. T. Kunju Muhammed	P. Jayapala Menon	
1999	Jalamarmaram	T. K. Rajeev Kumar	Radhika Suresh Gopi, Latha Kurian Rajeev	
2000	Madhuranombarakattu	Kamal	P. Nandakumar	
2001	Meghamalhar	Kamal	Shreyams Kumar	
2002	Sthithi	R. Sarath	T. P. Abdul Khader	
2003	Paadam Onnu: Oru Vilapam	T. V. Chandran	Aryadan Shoukath	
2004	Kathavasheshan	T. V. Chandran	Dileep	
2005	Achanurangatha Veedu	Lal Jose	Reji Puthayath	
2006	Notebook	Rosshan Andrrews	P. V. Gangadharan	
2007	Ore Kadal	Shyamaprasad	Vindhyan	
2008	Bhoomi Malayalam	T. V. Chandran	Revathi Chandran, V. P. Abeesh	
2009	Raamanam	M. P. Sukumaran Nair	M. P. Sukumaran Nair	
2010	Makaramanju	Lenin Rajendran	Green Cinema B Rakesh	
2011	Ivan Megharoopan	P. Balachandran	Prakash Bare, Gopa Periyadan	
2012	Ozhimuri	Madhupal	P. N. Venugopal	
2013	North 24 Kaatham	Anil Radhakrishnan Menon	C. V. Sarathi	
2014	My Life Partner	Padmakumar	Reji Mon	
2015	Amoeba	Manoj Kana	Priyesh Kumar	
2016	Ottayaal paatha	Santhosh Babusenan and Satish Babusenan		
2017	Aedan	Sanju Surendran	Murali Mattummal	
2018	Oru Njayarazhcha	Shyamaprasad	Sarathchandran Nair	
2019	Kenjira	Manoj Kana	Neru Films & Mangad Foundation	
2020	Thinkalazhcha Nishchayam	Senna Hegde	Pushkara Mallikarjunaiah	
2021	Chavittu	Rahman Brothers	Sharaf U Dheen	
2021	Nishiddho	Tara Ramanujam	Kerala State Film Development Corporation	
2022	Adithattu	Jijo Antony	Godjo J.	
2023	Iratta	Rohit M. G. Krishnan	Joju George, Martin Prakkat	
2024	Feminichi Fathima	Fasil Muhammed	Thamar K. V, Sudheesh Skaria	

== Kerala State Film Award for Third Best Film ==
The Kerala State Film Award for Third Best Film was an award presented from 1969 to 1972, afterwards, it was discontinued.

Year	Film	Director	Producer
1969	Janmabhoomi	John Sankaramangalam	John Sankaramangalam
1970	Aranazhika Neram	K. S. Sethumadhavan	M. O. Joseph
1971	Karakanakadal	K. S. Sethumadhavan	Hari Pothen
1972	Aromalunni	Kunchacko	Kunchacko

== See also ==
- Kerala State Film Award for Best Film
