= Krishnankutty =

1981 film

Krishnankutty is a 1981 Malayalam film that marks the directorial debut of T. V. Chandran. The film started production during the emergency period. A critical and commercial failure, this experimental film did not even have a wide public release. The film represents a continuation of P. A. Backer's style of independent film. The music for the film is composed by director Pavithran.
