= Kabani Nadi Chuvannappol =

- Promotional ad
- Directed by: P. A. Backer
- Written by: P. A. Backer
- Produced by: Pavithran
- Starring: T. V. Chandran; Raveendran; J. Siddiqui; Shalini
- Cinematography: Vipindas
- Edited by: Kalyanasundaram
- Music by: Devarajan
- Production company: Saga Movie Makers
- Release date: 16 July 1976
- Country: India
- Language: Malayalam

Kabani Nadi Chuvannappol (When the River Kabani Turned Red) is a 1975 Malayalam feature film directed by P. A. Backer, produced by Pavithran, and starring T. V. Chandran, Shalini, Raveendran and J. Siddiqui. This leftist political drama film came out during the Emergency period. It was the directorial debut of P. A. Backer, who won that year's awards for Best Director and Second Best Film at the Kerala State Film Awards. Pavithran, who later directed many critically acclaimed Malayalam films produced the film. T. V. Chandran, who also later went on to direct a bevy of award-winning films in Malayalam and Tamil, played the lead role. After certain post-production controversies, the film debuted in theatres on 16 July 1976.

== Cast ==
- TV Chandran
- Salam Karassery
- J Sidhiq
- Laila
- Miss Don
- Pailunni
- Shalini
- K. Ravindran

== Production and release ==
The principal production started in June 1975. The day when shoot of the film commenced in Bangalore, Emergency was declared in India.

The film was screened at several film festivals in 1975. It was not given the censor certificate for the theme it dealt with for more than a year. It released in theatres during the Emergency period itself, on 16 July 1976.

The English title of the film is When the River Kabani Turned Red.

== Awards ==
Kerala State Film Awards

- Second Best Film – P. A. Backer (director), Pavithran (producer)
- Best Director – P. A. Backer

== Additional information ==
T.V. Chandran, previously a Reserve Bank of India employee, made his debut as an actor in this movie. It was the producer Pavithran who introduced him to director Backer.

Backer had already shot parts of the movie with Sudheer and Usha Nandini as the lead pair. The production ran into financial issues. Pavithran came to the rescue by selling his home and the yard around it in Kerala. However, Backer abandoned the earlier footage, revised the script, and changed the cast.

The film portrays the life of Arikkad Varghese, popularly known as "Naxal Varghese" or "Saghavu (Comrade) Varghese."
