= Sunny Joseph =

Indian cinematographer and director

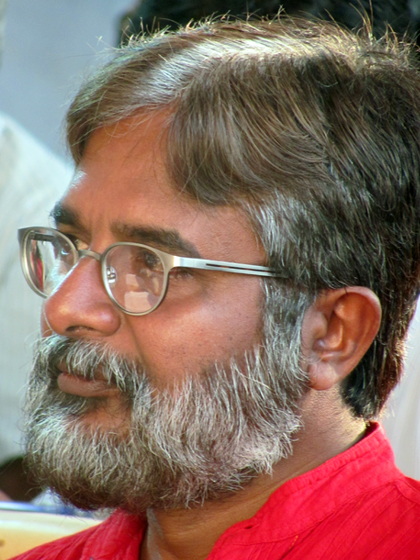
- Born: 27 May 1957 (age 69); Cherthala, Kerala, India
- Education: Film and Television Institute of India
- Occupations: Cinematographer, Film Director
- Years active: 1983 - present
- Known for: Piravi, Vasthuhaara, Nizhalkuth, Janala, Train to Pakistan, Kahini, Mangamma, Ramanujan, Chotti Motti Batein
- Spouse: Pushpa Sunny
- Children: Anil Sunny, Aparna Sunny
- Website: [Official website]

Sunny Joseph ISC (born 27 May 1957) is an Indian cinematographer and director from Kerala, most known for his work in Shaji N. Karun classic, Piravi, for which he won the 1988 Kerala State Film Award for Best Cinematography and Piravi also won a Caméra d'Or — Mention Spéciale at the 1989 Cannes Film Festival. He has Post Graduate Diploma in Cinematography from the Film and Television Institute of India (FTII), Pune. He is a former Chairman and General Secretary of Indian Society of Cinematographers, (ISC).

== Early life and education ==
Born in 1957 in Kerala to CV Joseph and Thressiamma, he grew up in a household among two brothers (one a twin brother) and six younger sisters. Sunny did his P.D.C. from St. Michael's College, Cherthala (Kerala University) in Alappuzha district in 1974, followed by B.Sc. in Zoology (completed course) from Deva Matha College, Kuravilangad, in the Kottayam district in 1977. He joined the Film and Television Institute of India (FTII), Pune in 1979, where he did a course - Diploma in Cinema, specialising in Motion Picture Photography and graduated in 1983.

== Career ==
After graduating from Film and Television Institute of India, Pune in 1983, Sunny Joseph started working as a cinematographer in 1987. Piravi, the film which he photographed for Shaji N. Karun became a landmark in his career and in Indian Cinema.

In 2002, Sunny assisted veteran cinematographer and Adoor Gopalakrishnan long-time collaborator, Mankada Ravi Varma, in his last work, Nizhalkuthu (2002) and eventually shot many scenes in the film for which Sunny is credited alongside Mankada Ravi Varma.

== Selected filmography ==
- The Clown and The Dog (1983) - Winner of the National Film Award for Best Experimental Film
- Theertham (1987)
- Piravi (1988)
- Ore Thooval Pakshikal (1988)
- Eenam Maranna Kattu (1988)
- Unni (1989)
- Pooram (1989)
- Alicinte Anveshanam (1989)
- Ottayal Pattalam (1990)
- Ottayadipathakal (1990)
- Kshanakathu (1990)
- Vasthuhara (1991)
- Aanaval Mothiram (1991)
- Satyaprathinja (1991)
- Kahini
- Sanabi (1995)
- Mogamul (1995)
- America! America!! (1997)
- Mangamma (1997)
- Daya (1998)
- Train to Pakistan (1998)
- Angene Oru Avadhikkalathu (1999)
- Oru Cheru Punchiri (2000)
- Thiladaanam (2000)
- Swayamvara Panthal (2000)
- Nizhalkuthu (2002)
- Dance Like a Man (2004)
- Daivanamathil (2005)
- Kamli (2006)
- Ami, Yasin Ar Amar Madhubala (2007)
- Chintu Ji (2009)
- Janala (2009)
- O Maria (2011)
- Ramanujan (2014)
- Sweet Home (2014)
- Moral Nights (2021)
- Tayaa Under production
