= Oru Indian Pranayakadha =

2013 film by Sathyan Anthikad

- Poster
- Directed by: Sathyan Anthikad
- Written by: Dr. Iqbal Kuttippuram
- Produced by: Rajesh Thiruvallom; Babu Mannarkadu; Renju; James
- Starring: Fahadh Faasil; Amala Paul
- Cinematography: Pradeep Nair
- Edited by: K. Rajagopal
- Music by: Vidyasagar
- Production company: Central Pictures
- Distributed by: Central Pictures
- Release date: 20 December 2013
- Country: India
- Language: Malayalam

Oru Indian Pranayakadha (transl. An Indian Love Story) is a 2013 Indian Malayalam-language romantic comedy film written by Ikbal Kuttipuram and directed by Sathyan Anthikad starring Fahadh Faasil and Amala Paul. Released on 20 December 2013, the film was a sleeper hit due to competition from Drishyam, which was released one day earlier.

== Plot ==
Oru Indian Pranayakadha is a love story which shows the relationship between a trickish young politician named Aymanam Sidharthan and a disciplined Canadian citizen of Indian origin named Irene Gardner. In the beginning, the story shows the political life of Sidharthan. He is the local youth wing leader political outfit. Protege of the district president of the party, Uthup Vallikkadan, Sidharthan hopes to make it big in politics. However, his dreams are shattered when the party High command decides to nominate the daughter of one of the party's senior leader named Vimala Ramanathan. This leads the young politician in despair. During this time the girl Irene Gardner visits Kerala to shoot a documentary. She is in search of an assistant to help her in shoot the film and approaches Uthup. Uthup requests Sidharthan to meet her and assist her. Sidharthan unwillingly went but when Irene promises INR 2000 per day for the assistant, so Siddharthan, who has financial issues, agrees to help her.

During this time Irene then is called by the police for a passport verification. Sidharthan begins to doubt her motives for coming to India. Irene reveals the secret that she has actually come in search for her birth parents. She is an adopted child. Her parents revealed that to her. So she decided to find out her birth parents. Sidharthan agrees to help her; they start their investigation. They come to know that a railway porter who know more about her past . They meet him but he refused to reveal what he knows, but at last he revealed that she is her parents’ illegitimate daughter. Irene decides to meet her parents without letting them know that she is their daughter. Meanwhile, Sidharthan breaks up with his girlfriend Divya who is going to marry an IAS officer.

Later, Irene finds out her birth mother is an ayurvedic doctor named Dr. Thulasi and they visit as a patient telling her that they're married and Irene lives at her mother's hospital for some time. Meanwhile, Sidharthan begins to fall in love with Irene, but neither is aware of this at present. They then discover her birth father's identity. His name is Azad and they go to Rajasthan to meet him. They approach her father is by telling that they're couple from Kerala. During their stay, they participate in Irene's half-sister's wedding and then return to Kerala. Irene then decides to go back to Canada, which Sidharthan does not agree with, as they have realized they are in love with each other. On airport Sidharthan gifts her a laminated photos of her parents and Irene also gifts him a book .

Two years later, Sidharthan is shown as a successful politician and he also completed his LLB. Irene comes back to India and decides to stay and both of them reunite.

== Cast ==
- Fahadh Faasil as Aymanam Sidharthan
- Amala Paul as Irene Gardner
- Innocent as Uthup Vallikkadan
- Shafna as Divya
- Neeraj Madhav as Charlie
- Muthumani as Dr. Vimala Ramanathan
- Krishna Praba as Sudha, Sidharth's sister
- Gopalan as Shivaraman
- Valsala Menon as Sidharth's grandmother
- Babu Annur as Sethumadhavan, Sidharth's Father
- Kani Kusruti as SP Jayalakshmi IPS
- Lakshmi Gopalaswamy as Dr. Thulasi
  - Anu Sithara as Young Thulasi (cameo)
- Prakash Bare as Azad
  - Rohit Menon as young Azad (cameo)
- Kala as Sidharth's Mother
- Riya Saira as Merin
- Rony David as SI Shankar
- Nisha Sarang as Sivaraman's wife
- Anjana Appukuttan as Irene's neighbour
- Ancy as Divya's mother
- Antony as Divya's father
- Rahul Ravi as Johan
- Janaki as Swathi
- Raj Pranav as Village boy
- Arun Nair as Roopesh
- Dilip as Benny
- Abijith Paul
- Thiruvalla Bhasi as Varkky Chettan
- M. G. Sasi as Dr. Sunil Kumar

== Production ==
For this film, Fahadh Faasil worked with Sathyan Anthikad for the first time. Unlike his previous movies, Sathyan Anthikad announced the title of the movie at the beginning of filming. The film was shot in and around Kottayam in Kerala and some portions in Jaisalmer, Rajasthan.

== Soundtrack ==
Oru Indian Pranayakadha

Soundtrack album by Vidyasagar
- Released: 13 December 2013
- Recorded: Varshaa Vallaki Studios
- Genre: Feature Film Soundtrack
- Length: 18:01
- Language: Malayalam
- Label: Muzik 247
- Producer: Vidyasagar

Vidyasagar chronology
Jannal Oram (2013)	Oru Indian Pranayakadha (2013)	Bhaiyya Bhaiyya (2014)

Vidyasagar composed the music; he associated with director Sathyan Anthikad for the first time, replacing maestro Ilaiyaraaja who had composed the music score for 10 of the last 12 movies directed by Sathyan. The film had four songs.

No.	Title	Singer(s)	Length
1.	"Saajan"	Shweta Mohan, M. M. Manasi, Harish & Chorus
2.	"Omana Poove"	Najim Arshad, Abhirami Ajai
3.	"Valudekkanum"	G. Sriram
4.	"Shyamameghame"	K. S. Chithra

== Reception ==
Oru Indian Pranyakatha is said to have grossed around ₹3.3 crore in 10 days of its release from Kerala box office. The film was commercial and critical success. The film completed 125 days in theatres.

== Awards ==
Kerala State Film Award 2013

- Kerala State Film Award for Best Editor - K. Rajagopal

Asianet Film Awards 2013

- Best Actress - Amala Paul

South Indian International Movie Awards 2013

- Best Actress (Malayalam) – Amala Paul

Vanitha Film Awards

- Best Popular Actress – Amala Paul
