= Kerala State Film Award for Best Music Director – Score =

Annual Indian film award

The Kerala State Film Award for Best Music Director – Score in a Malayalam film is presented annually at the Kerala State Film Awards.

== Superlatives ==
Wins	Recipient
5	Bijibal
4	Isaac Thomas Kottukapally
2	Johnson, Illayaraja

== Winners ==
The Kerala State Film Award for Best Background Music Director winners:

No	Year	Music director	Film
1	1980	Gunasingh	Manjil Virinja Pookkal
2	1991	G. Devarajan	Yamanam
3	1992	Johnson	Sadayam
4	1993	Bombay Ravi	Ghazal (1993 film)
5	1994	Illayaraja	Sammohanam (1994 film)
6	1995	Jerry Amaldev	Kazhakam (1996 film)
7	1996	Johnson (composer)	Sallapam
8	1997	Rajamani	Aaram Thamburan
9	1998	Illayaraja	Kallu Kondoru Pennu
10	1999	Sunny Stephen	Karunam
11	2000	Biju.P	Mazha
12	2001	Kaithapram Vishwanathan Namboothiri	Kannaki (film)
13	2002	Isaac Thomas Kottukapally	Bhavam
14	2003	Isaac Thomas Kottukapally	Margam (film)
15	2004	Isaac Thomas Kottukapally	Oridam; Sancharam
16	2005	Ramesh Narayan	Saira (film)
17	2006	V. Thashi	Tanthra
18	2007	Ouseppachan	Ore Kadal
19	2008	Chandran Veyattummal	Bioscope
20	2009	Rahul Raj	Rithu
21	2010	Isaac Thomas Kottukapally	Adaminte Makan Abu; Veettilekkulla Vazhi
22	2011	Deepak Dev	Urumi
23	2012	Bijibal	Kaliyachan; Ozhimuri
24	2013	Bijibal	Balyakalasakhi
25	2014	Bijibal	Njaan
26	2015	Bijibal	Pathemari; Nee-Na
27	2016	Vishnu Vijay	Guppy
28	2017	Gopi Sundar	Take Off
29	2018	Bijibal	Aami
30	2019	Ajmal Hassbulla	Vrithakrithyilulla Chathuram
31	2020	M. Jayachandran	Sufiyum Sujatayum
32	2021	Justin Varghese	Joji
33	2022	Dawn Vincent	Nna Thaan Case Kodu
34	2023	Mathews Pulickan	Kaathal - The Core
35	2024	Christo Xavier	Bramayugam
