= T. V. Chandran =

Indian film director, screenwriter, and actor

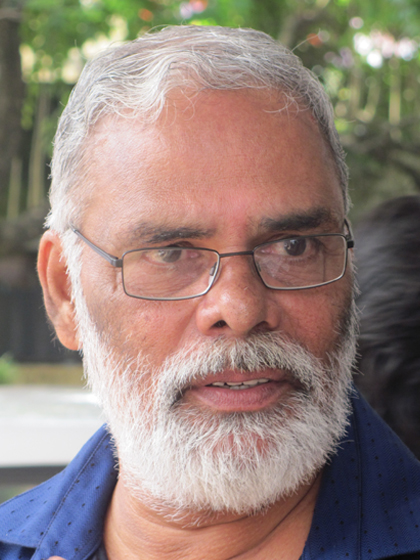
- Born: 23 November 1950 (age 75); Thalassery, Malabar District, Madras State, India
- Occupations: Film director; screenwriter; actor
- Years active: 1975–present
- Spouse: Revathi
- Children: 1
- Website: tvchandran.com

T. V. Chandran (born 23 November 1950) is an Indian film director, screenwriter, and actor, predominantly working in Malayalam cinema. Born in a Malayali family in Thalassery, Chandran worked as a Reserve Bank of India employee before entering the film industry. He started his film career as an assistant director to P. A. Backer. He also acted the lead role in Backer's highly acclaimed political drama Kabani Nadi Chuvannappol (1975). He made his directorial debut with the unreleased feature Krishnan Kutty (1981), and followed this with the Tamil film Hemavin Kadhalargal (1985). Chandran came into prominence after Alicinte Anveshanam (1989), which was nominated for the Golden Leopard at the Locarno International Film Festival. This was followed with Ponthan Mada (1993), his most famous film to date. Chandran is most known for his art-house films which have references to history and undertones of politics and feminism. He is also known for his trilogy on 2002 Gujarat riots, consisting of Kathavasheshan (2004), Vilapangalkappuram (2008) and Bhoomiyude Avakashikal (2012). Other highly acclaimed films include Mangamma (1997), Dany (2001) and Paadam Onnu: Oru Vilapam (2003).

Chandran has won several film awards including six National Film Awards and ten Kerala State Film Awards. In 2023, Chandran was awarded the J. C. Daniel Award, the highest award in Malayalam cinema. In addition to these, he is a recipient of a number of awards at various International film festivals.

== Early life and background ==
T. V. Chandran was born in Telicherry (Thalassery), Malabar District, Madras State, the present day Kannur District, Kerala, to Narayanan and Karthyayini Amma. After graduating with a degree from Christ College, Irinjalakuda, and a post graduation from Farook College, University of Calicut, he embarked on a career as a Reserve Bank of India employee before starting his film career. In his college days, Chandran was sympathetic to naxalite ideology and was closely associated with the Communist Party.

Chandran's son Yadavan Chandran and brother Soman are also filmmakers. Yadavan has directed docu-films and has assisted Chandran in many of his films. Soman has been working as an assistant with Chandran right from his first film. Chandran's attachment with his other brother, who died in Nigeria in the 1980s, later inspired the film Sankaranum Mohananum.

== Career ==
=== Early years: 1975–1981 ===
T. V. Chandran has had no formal training in film-making. He began his film career as an actor in P. A. Backer's Kabani Nadi Chuvannappol (1975). The leftist political cinema that came out during the Emergency period was adjudged Second Best Film in the Kerala State Film Awards. P. A. Backer was awarded Best Director that year for his directorial debut. The cast includes T. V. Chandran, Raveendran, J. Siddiqui and Shalini.

Chandran then worked as an assistant to P. A. Backer and the avant-garde filmmaker John Abraham. According to Chandran, it was his association with director V. K. Pavithran (who also produced Kabani Nadi Chuvannappol), that caused his transformation into the "condemned status" of a filmmaker. He says: "Our association had begun when I was just over 14, and since then we used to clandestinely share our interest in the film medium. Filmmaking was an event of celebration in the case of Pavithran and every phase of his productions had an exciting participation of the masses."

=== Breakthrough: 1981–89 ===
Chandran debuted as a director with Krishnan Kutty (1981). A critical and commercial failure, this experimental film did not even have a wide public release. The film represents a continuation of P. A. Backer's style of independent film. Chandran's next venture was the Tamil feature film Hemavin Kadhalargal (1985). This film starred Delhi Ganesh and Anuradha. The film marked the debut of the latter, who dominated Tamil cinema for quite a long time. Though Hemavin Kadhalargal was a commercial success and garnered favourable reviews, Chandran got his much needed break only with his third venture Alicinte Anveshanam (1989). A mystery film by genre, it narrated the journey of a lady in search of her missing husband. It was the official entry from India for the Locarno International Film Festival, and got a nomination for the Golden Leopard.

=== International acclaim: 1993–2001 ===
In 1993, Chandran's much acclaimed Ponthan Mada, was released. He cast two of India's greatest method actors, Mammootty and Nasiruddin Shah, in the film that focused on the feudal era. It was based on C. V. Sreeraman's two short stories: "Ponthan Mada" and "Sheema Thampuran". The film earned the national and state awards to Mammootty.

Chandran's next venture Ormakal Undayirikkanam (1995) starred Bharath Gopi, Mammootty, Master Nitin, Nedumudi Venu and Sreenivasan. It portrayed the rise of the Communists to power in 1957 and the Vimochana Samaram (Liberation Struggle) of 1959. The film earned a national and a state award to Chandran. Film critic Kozhikodan included the film on his list of the ten best Malayalam movies of all time. With critical success coming back to back, Chandran wrote and directed Mangamma. Produced by the National Film Development Corporation of India (NFDC), it was screened at the Zanzibar International Film Festival. The film won many major awards, including national and state awards.

The references to feminism can be best observed in Susanna (2000), a drama about Susanna, who appears to be a prostitute living with five different people at the same time. Vani Viswanath played the title role, widely appreciated to be the best in her career. Chandran originally cast noted dancer Mallika Sarabhai in this role, but she opted out citing her busy schedule. As compensation, Sarabhai was given a major role by Chandran in his next venture Dany (2001), a comedy drama with Mammootty in the title role. It was Chandran's third collaboration with Mammootty. The film garnered universal acclaim with most of the critics hailing the performance of Mammootty. Chandran himself has rated this as the finest performance by any lead actor. The protagonist of this film is a mute witness to many historical world events. It won numerous awards including a National Film Award and three State Film Awards.

=== Paadam Onnu: Oru Vilapam and onwards: 2003–2012 ===
Chandrans following project, Paadam Onnu: Oru Vilapam (2003), dealt with child marriage and polygamy prevailing in traditional Muslim communities of Kerala. Meera Jasmine played the lead role, who won the National and State Film Award for Best Actress for her performance in the film as a teenage Muslim girl. The premiere of the film saw protests from a group of Islamic periodicals in Kerala. The date of release was postponed more than once for this reason. The film won the National Film Award for Best Film on Family Welfare. T. V. Chandran narrowly missed his second national award as the best director for this film. As there was a tie, the casting vote of the chairman of the jury went to Bengali director Goutam Ghose. With Paadam Onnu: Oru Vilapam, Chandran ended his association with music director Johnson, bringing in background music specialist Issac Thomas Kottukapally to score his social thriller Kathavasheshan (2004). Co-produced by and starring Dileep, the film follows a murder mystery. The film tells the story of a civil engineer who commits suicide as a protest against the 2002 Gujarat riots. The film stands odd in the filmography of Chandran for the narrative style it had. The film emerged the biggest winner at the Kerala State Film Awards with four wins. Chandran then worked in a Tamil psychological drama – Aadum Koothu (2005). The film unfolds from the life of a college student who can see what others don't. The film – starring Navya Nair, Cheran and Prakash Raj – was screened at various film festivals in 2005–06, but was not released in theatres. It won the National Film Award for Best Feature Film in Tamil in 2005. Vilapangalkkappuram – based on the aftermath of the Gujarat riots of 2002 – was released in 2005. Priyanka, Biju Menon, Sudheesh and Suhasini played the pivotal roles, and Priyanka won a state award for her performance in the film as a Muslim woman gang raped by a group of communalists.

In 2008, Chandran returned as an actor after his debut in Kabani Nadi Chuvannappol, in M. G. Sasi's Atayalangal. He played the supporting role of Bhaskara Kurup in the film that won five state film awards. With Boomi Malayalam (2009), another film focusing on themes of feminism, he associated with Suresh Gopi for the first time. The film was structurally different from Chandran's earlier attempts at mapping female life as the film depicted the plight of seven different women who represent different periods of time with all of them sharing a common feeling—–fear.

Most of Chandran's films were average performers at the box office even though they received strong positive reviews from critics and garnered awards at state, national and international levels. All of his films were screened at major national and international film festivals. He forayed into mainstream cinema with his next venture – Sankaranum Mohananum (2011) – a comedy fantasy starring Jayasurya, Meera Nandan and Rima Kallingal. The film had Jayasurya appearing in 20 different getups. It was not a commercial success and was panned by critics. The film was screened at the "Malayalam Cinema Today" Section of the International Film Festival of Kerala.

Chandran concluded his trilogy on 2002 Gujarat riots with the film Bhoomiyude Avakashikal (2012), a drama starring Kailash and Sreenivasan. The film started production in June 2012 and had its title adapted from the famous short story "Bhoomiyude Avakashikal" by Vaikom Muhammad Basheer. The film's protagonist is driven away from Ahmedabad following the riots and eventually lands up in a secluded house in Kerala, in the company of insects and animals with whom he shares his thoughts, concerns, doubts and frustrations. The film was an official selection at at least three film festivals.

=== Later years: 2015–present ===
In 2016, Chandran directed Mohavalayam which narrates the life of Malayalis who reach Bahrain from Saudi Arabia, crossing the King Fahd Causeway. It was the first Indian film to be shot entirely in Bahrain. In August 2018, Chandran started the production works of his next project Pengalila which depicts the emotional bond between an 8-year-old girl and a 65-year-old daily wage worker who comes to clean up the backyard of the girl's house. In 2023, Chandran received the highest award in Malayalam cinema, the J. C. Daniel Award for the year 2022.

Chandran has also directed a few tele-films and tele-serials. Notable among them are the tele-film Varum Varaykakal, which won the State TV Award for Second Best Tele-film, and the tele-serial, Sadasivante Kumbasaram.

== Awards ==
National Film Awards

- 1993 – National Film Award for Best Director : Ponthan Mada
- 1995 – National Film Award for Best Feature Film in Malayalam: Ormakal Undayirikkanam
- 1997 – National Film Award for Best Feature Film in Malayalam: Mangamma
- 2001 – National Film Award for Best Feature Film in Malayalam: Dany
- 2003 – National Film Award for Best Film on Family Welfare : Paadam Onnu: Oru Vilapam
- 2005 – National Film Award for Best Feature Film in Tamil : Aadum Koothu

Kerala State Film Awards

- 1989 – Kerala State Film Award for Second Best Film: Alicinte Anveshanam
- 1993 – Kerala State Film Award for Second Best Film: Ponthan Mada
- 1995 – Kerala State Film Award (Special Jury Award): Ormakal Undayirikkanam
- 1997 – Kerala State Film Award for Best Director : Mangamma
- 2000 – Kerala State Film Award (Special Jury Award):Susanna
- 2001 – Kerala State Film Award for Best Director : Dany
- 2003 – Kerala State Film Award for Second Best Film: Paadam Onnu: Oru Vilapam
- 2004 – Kerala State Film Award for Second Best Film: Kathavasheshan
- 2004 – Kerala State Film Award for Best Screenplay : Kathavasheshan
- 2008 – Kerala State Film Award for Second Best Film: Boomi Malayalam
- 2022 – J. C. Daniel Award

== Filmography ==
Year	Film	Director	Producer	Screenplay	Story	Notes
1981	Krishnan Kutty	Yes		Yes	Yes	Unreleased film
1985	Hemavin Kadhalargal (Hema's Lovers)	Yes		Yes	Yes	Tamil film
1989	Alicinte Anveshanam (The Search of Alice)	Yes	Yes	Yes	Yes	Kerala State Film Award for Second Best Film; Nominated for the Golden Leopard at Locarno International Film Festival; Indian Panorama selection at the International Film Festival of India
1993	Ponthan Mada (Pumpkin Mada)	Yes		Yes		National Film Award for Best Director; Kerala State Film Award for Second Best Film; Muttathu Varkey Award; Participation at Pessaro Film Festival; Indian Panorama selection at the International Film Festival of India
1995	Ormakal Undayirikkanam (Memories and Desires)	Yes		Yes	Yes	National Film Award for Best Feature Film in Malayalam; Kerala State Film Award (Special Jury Award); Participation at Phnom Penh International Film Festival; Indian Panorama selection at the International Film Festival of India
1997	Mangamma	Yes		Yes	Yes	National Film Award for Best Feature Film in Malayalam; Kerala State Film Award for Best Director; Audience Prize for Best Film at the International Film Festival of Kerala; Participation at Zanzibar International Film Festival; Participation at SAARC Film Festival; Indian Panorama selection at the International Film Festival of India
2000	Susanna	Yes	Yes	Yes	Yes	Kerala State Film Award (Special Jury Award); Kerala Film Critics Award for Best Film; Kerala Film Critics Award for Best Director; Padmarajan Award for Best Director; Padmarajan Award for Best Screenplay; Bharathan Award for Best Director; Asianet Film Award for Best Screenplay; Mathrubhumi Award for Best Director
2001	Dany	Yes	Yes	Yes	Yes	National Film Award for Best Feature Film in Malayalam; Kerala State Film Award for Best Director; Audience Prize for Best Film at the International Film Festival of Kerala; Asianet Film Award for Best Film (Special Jury Prize); Mathrubhumi Film Award for Best Film (Special Jury Prize); John Abraham Award for Best Feature Film; Participation at the Cinemaya International Film Festival; Indian Panorama selection at the International Film Festival of India
2003	Paadam Onnu: Oru Vilapam (Lesson One: A Wail)	Yes		Yes	Yes	National Film Award for Best Film on Family Welfare; Kerala State Film Award for Second Best Film; Don Quixote Award for Best Film; Mobyl Award at the Dhaka International Film Festival; Kerala Film Critics Award for Best Film; Kerala Film Critics Award for Best Director; Mathrubhumi Award for Best Film; Padmarajan Award for Best Film; Ramu Kariat Award; Participation at Palm Springs International Film Festival; Participation at Bangkok International Film Festival 2004; Participation at Cairo International Film Festival 2004; Indian Panorama selection at the International Film Festival of India
2004	Kathavasheshan (The Deceased)	Yes		Yes	Yes	Kerala State Film Award for Second Best Film; Kerala State Film Award for Best Screenplay; Participation at The Cinemaya International Film Festival; Indian Panorama selection at the International Film Festival of India
2005	Aadum Koothu	Yes	Yes	Yes	Yes	Tamil film National Film Award for Best Feature Film in Tamil; Competition entry at International Film Festival of Kerala; Indian Panorama selection at the International Film Festival of India
2008	Vilapangalkkappuram (Beyond the Wail)	Yes		Yes	Yes	Entry at International Film Festival of Kerala; Indian Panorama selection at the International Film Festival of India
2008	Boomi Malayalam (The Mother Earth)	Yes		Yes	Yes	Kerala State Film Award for Second Best Film; John Abraham Award for Best Film
2011	Sankaranum Mohananum (Sankaran and Mohanan)	Yes		Yes	Yes	Entry at International Film Festival of Kerala
2012	Bhoomiyude Avakashikal (The Inheritors of the Earth)	Yes		Yes	Yes	Competition entry at International Film Festival of Kerala; Indian Panorama selection at the International Film Festival of India; Indian Panorama selection at the Chennai International Film Festival
2016	Mohavalayam	Yes		Yes	Yes	
2019	Pengalila (Sister Leaf)	Yes		Yes	Yes	

As actor

- Kabani Nadi Chuvannappol (When the River Kabani Turned Red; 1976)
- Kattu Vannu Vilichappol (2000)
- Atayalangal (The Imprints; 2008)
