= V. K. Sreeraman =

Indian actor, writer, TV anchor and social worker

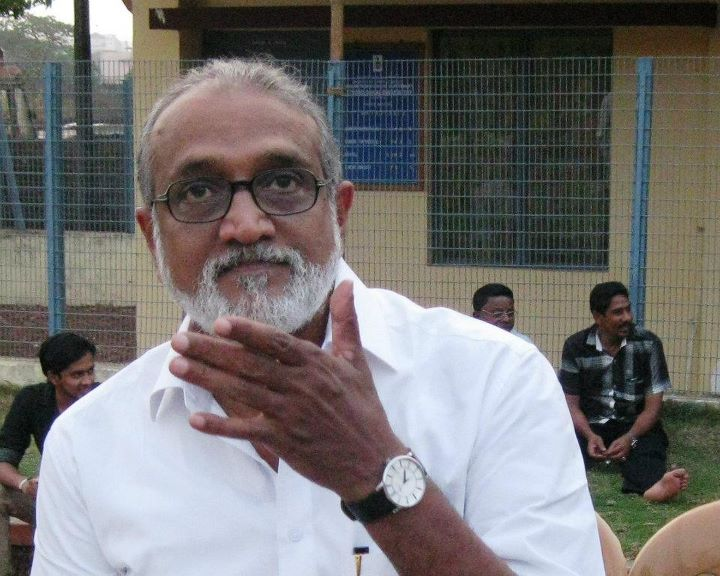
- Born: 6 February 1953 (age 73); Thrissur, Kerala, India
- Occupations: Film actor; Writer; TV Anchor; Social worker
- Spouse: Geetha
- Children: 2
- Parents: V. C. Krishnan; Bhargavi Krishnan

Vettiyattil Krishnan Sreeraman (born 6 February 1953) is an Indian actor, writer, TV anchor and social worker. He acted in more than 150 films.

== Personal life and education ==
He was born into a middle-class family at Cheruvathani village near Kunnamkulam, situated in Thrissur district of Kerala. His father V. C. Krishnan of the Vettiyattil family worked in Ceylon as a Hotel Manager while his mother Bhargavi Krishnan was a teacher by profession. Sreeraman is the second son of his parents, following an elder brother named Jayaprakash (b. 1948), and preceding an unnamed younger brother, who died soon after he was born. He had his education from Vaduthala Upper Primary School (Where his mother worked), St. George High School Thozhiyoor, Government Higher Secondary School Kunnamkulam and College of Fine Arts, Thrissur. He is married to Geetha, and has two children - a daughter named Lakshmi, and a son named Harikrishnan.

== Career ==
His acting career started with one of India's greatest filmmaker G. Aravindan in his internationally acclaimed film Thampu (1978). He made his appearance in the mini screen also through "Natarangu" a discussion program in Asianet and then "Natukootam" in Kairali Channel. He is the anchor of 'Sreeramante Veritta Kazhchakal' program in Kairali Channel where he introduces people from different walks of live whose life experiences are a learning for others and influence the thinking of society. His unique style in writing makes him different from his peers. He acted in many Malayalam movies. On 27 May 2018, Sreeraman's fake obituary was made in social media, and went viral, until Sreeraman himself proved that he was still alive and well.

== Filmography ==
1. 1978 Thampu
2. 1984 Akkare
3. 1985 Kanathaya Penkutti
4. 1986 Uppu ..... Abdul Rahman Musaliyar
5. 1988 Thaala
6. 1988 Mrithyunjayam ..... Raghavan
7. 1988 Vaishali ..... Vibhandaka
8. 1988 Piravi (as C.V. Sreeraman)
9. 1988 Moonnam Mura ..... Simon
10. 1988 Kakkothikkavile Appooppan Thaadikal ..... Poovachu
11. 1988 Dhwani ..... Thampi
12. 1989 Peruvannapurathe Visheshangal ..... Kannappakkuruppu
13. 1989 Pandu Pandoru Desathu
14. 1989 Layanam
15. 1989 Antharjanam ..... Bhadran
16. 1989 V.I.P. ..... Johny
17. 1989 Alicinte Anveshanam
18. 1989 Oru Vadakkan Veeragatha ..... Kunjiraman
19. 1989 Utharam ..... Superintendent
20. 1989 Carnivel ..... Cyriac Kureekkadan
21. 1990 Raktharakshassu
22. 1990 Vachanam
23. 1990 Kattukuthira
24. 1990 No: 20 Madras Mail
25. 1991 Bhoomika
26. 1991 Nayam Vyakthamakkunnu
27. 1991 Nattuvishesham
28. 1991 Inspector Balram ..... Hussain Sahib
29. 1992 Annu Good Friday
30. 1992 Sathya Prathijna
31. 1992 Radhachakram ..... Peter
32. 1992 Swaroopam
33. 1992 Sargam ..... Kochanyian Thampuran
34. 1992 Adharam
35. 1993 Sarovaram
36. 1993 Ghoshayathra ..... Fakkuruddin Haji
37. 1993 Magrib
38. 1993 Devasuram ..... Kuruppu
39. 1993 Chamayam
40. 1993 Bhoomi Geetham ..... Central Minister
41. 1993 Bandhukkal Sathrukkal ..... Psychiatrist Babu
42. 1993 Aayirappara ..... Basheer
43. 1994 Ponthan Mada
44. 1994 Sudha Madhalam
45. 1994 Sukrutham ..... Doctor Rahim
46. 1994 Pingami ..... Police officer
47. 1994 Vishnu
48. 1995 Vrudhanmare Sookshikkuka ..... Major
49. 1995 Arabia
50. 1995 Kalyanji Anandji ..... Girijavallabhan
51. 1995 Sasinas
52. 1995 Sphadikam ..... Pookoya
53. 1995 Kaatttile Thadi Thevarude Ana ..... Vaidyar
54. 1995 Aadyathe Kanmani ..... Divakaran
55. 1995 Nattuvishesham
56. 1995 Oru Abhibhashakante Case Diary ..... CI Rajan
57. 1996 Kaathil Oru Kinnaram ..... Kareem Bhai
58. 1996 Hitler
59. 1997 Oru Yathra Mozhi
60. 1997 Maanikyakkoodaaram ..... Balan
61. 1997 Kadhanayakan ..... Madhavan Nair
62. 1997 Gajaraja Manthram
63. 1997 Journey to Wisdom
64. 1997 Aaram Thamburan ..... Eashwaranunni
65. 1997 Moksham
66. 1998 Summer in Bethlehem ..... Balachandran
67. 1998 Gloria Fernandez From USA
68. 1998 Sneham
69. 1998 Meenakshi Kalyanam ..... Madhavan Thampi
70. 1998 Harikrishnans ..... Gabriel
71. 1998 Elavamkodu Desam ..... Nethran
72. 1999 Thachiledathu Chundan ..... Sekharan
73. 1999 Pallavur Devanarayanan ..... Mohanakrishnan
74. 1999 Garshom
75. 1999 Friends ..... Justice Poonkulathu Shankara Menon
76. 1999 Ezhupunna Tharakan ..... Ramabhadran
77. 2000 Ival Draupadi
78. 2000 Madhuranombarakattu
79. 2000 Summer Palace
80. 2000 Swayamvarapanthal
81. 2000 Shantham
82. 2000 Mark Antony ..... Mambally Chakkappan
83. 2000 Valliettan ..... Soopi Haji
84. 2000 Narasimham ..... Venu Master
85. 2000 Sradha
86. 2001 Saivar Thirumeni ..... Damodara Menon
87. 2001 Jeevan Masai
88. 2001 Chitrathoonukal
89. 2001 Andolanam
90. 2001 Ravanaprabhu ..... Kuruppu
91. 2001 One-Man Show
92. 2002 Yathrakarude Sradhakku ..... Isaac
93. 2002 Abharanacharthu
94. 2002 Nandanam
95. 2003 Kilichundan Mampazham ..... Alavikkutty
96. 2003 Mizhirandilum
97. 2003 Melvilasam Sariyanu
98. 2003 Malsaram
99. 2003 Mizhi Randilum
100. 2003 Ammakilikkoodu ..... Priest
101. 2004 Vamanapuram Bus Route ..... Gangadharan
102. 2004 Vajram ..... Shankar
103. 2004 Maampazhakkaalam
104. 2005 Chandrolsavam
105. 2005 Bharathchandran I.P.S. ..... Mayamparam Baba
106. 2005 Udayon ..... Advocate Sreedharan
107. 2005 Nerariyan CBI ..... Shankaran
108. 2005 Lokanathan IAS ..... Hassan Haji
109. 2005 The Tiger ..... C.R. Menon
110. 2006 Pulijanmam ..... KKC
111. 2006 Prajapathi ..... Gangadhara Menon
112. 2006 Oruvan
113. 2006 Classmates
114. 2006 Rashtram ..... Varadarajan
115. 2006 Vaasthavam
116. 2006 Karutha Pakshikal ..... Doctor Pai
117. 2006 Yes Your Honour ..... Maya's father
118. 2007 Big B ..... Advocate
119. 2007 Nagaram ..... Vaidyar
120. 2007 Ali Bhai
121. 2007 Paradesi
122. 2008 Pachamarathanalil ..... Lohi
123. 2008 Atayalangal ..... Damuettan
124. 2008 Madampi ..... Kottilakathu Parameswaran Kuruppu
125. 2008 Vilapangalkkappuram ..... Salim
126. 2009 Meghatheertham ..... Balunarayan's Father
127. 2009 Sagar Alias Jacky Reloaded ..... CM's secretary
128. 2009 Chattambinadu ..... TV show Anchor (Cameo)
129. 2009 The Mother Earth
130. 2010 Soofi Paranja Katha ..... Saidu Mullah
131. 2010 De Nova
132. 2010 Sahasram ..... Aboobacker IPS
133. 2010 Drona 2010 ..... Pattazhi Sankaran Namboothiripadu
134. 2010 Pranchiyettan & the Saint ..... Achutha Warrier
135. 2011 1993 Bombay March 12
136. 2011 Veeraputhran
137. 2011 Swapna Sanchari ..... Mathew (Cameo)
138. 2011 Bhakthajanangalude Sradhakku
139. 2011 Venicile Vyapari ..... Ali Koya
140. 2012 Bavuttiyude Namathil
141. 2012 Ithra Mathram
142. 2012 Da Thadiya ..... Hajiyar
143. 2012 Nammukku Parkkan
144. 2012 Spirit
145. 2012 Prabhuvinte Makkal
146. 2012 Ivan Megharoopan ..... Padmanabha Kuruppu
147. 2012 Kunjaliyan ..... Maya's father
148. 2012 Masters
149. 2012 Simhasanam ..... Kollamkottu Krishna Sharma
150. 2013 Lisammayude Veedu
151. 2013 Natholi Oru Cheriya Meenalla ..... Himself
152. 2013 Sound Thoma ..... Doctor (Cameo)
153. 2014 Munnariyippu ..... Sasikumar
154. 2015 Amar Akbar Anthony ..... Mash
155. 2017 Sunday Holiday ..... Abdul Salam Hajiyar
156. 2017 Comrade In America
157. 2021 Roy
158. 2021 Kaalchilambu
159. 2022 Neyyattinkara Gopante Arattu ..... TV show Anchor (Cameo)
160. 2022 Pada ..... E. K. Nayanar
161. 2022 Kaduva ..... Bishop
162. 2022 Simon Daniel
163. 2022 Roy

== Television career ==
Serial

- Avasthantharangal (Kairali TV)
- Kadamattathu Kathanar (TV series) (Asianet)
- Krishnakripasagaram (Amrita TV)
- Swami Ayyappan (TV series) (Asianet)
- Kayamkulam kochunniyude makan(Surya TV)

As host

- Sreeramante verittakazhchakal(Kairali TV) - Anchor
- Nattarangu (Asianet)
- Nattukoottam (Kairali)

== Awards ==
1. Bahumukha Prathibha -Flowers TV awards 2017 for verittakazhchakal (TV show)
