= Dany (film) =

2001 film by T. V. Chandran

- Film poster
- Directed by: T. V. Chandran
- Written by: T. V. Chandran
- Produced by: T. V. Chandran
- Starring: Mammootty, Mallika Sarabhai, Vani Viswanath, Siddique, Vijayaraghavan, Ratheesh, Maya Moushmi, Narendra Prasad
- Cinematography: K. G. Jayan
- Edited by: Venugopal
- Music by: Johnson
- Production company: Film Commune
- Release date: 28 December 2001
- Running time: 120 minutes
- Country: India
- Language: Malayalam

Dany is a 2001 Indian Malayalam-language tragicomedy film written, directed, and produced by T.V. Chandran with Mammootty in the title role. It also stars the noted dancer Mallika Sarabhai, Vani Viswanath, Siddique, Vijayaraghavan, Ratheesh, popular television actress Maya Moushmi, Raji Menon, and Narendra Prasad. It was released coinciding with the Christmas in December 2001. The film met with critical acclaim with most of the critics hailing the performance of Mammootty. It won numerous awards, including a National Film Award and three Kerala State Film Awards.

== Cast ==
- Mammootty as Daniel Thompson aka Dany
- Mallika Sarabhai as Bhargavi Amma
- Vani Viswanath as Margarette, Dany's wife
- Siddique as Freddy
- Vijayaraghavan as Robert Daniel Thompson, Dany's son.
- Maya Moushmi as Louisiana, Daughter of Dany and Clara
- Ratheesh as Dr. Renji Thomas
- Narendra Prasad as Fr. Simon
- N. F. Varghese as Prof. Padmanabha Menon
- Poornima Mohan as Madhavi
- Urmila Unni as Jayalakshmi
- Devadevan Vijayaraghavan as younger Robert and Robert's son, Albert Robert Thompson
- Aliyar as Narayanan Nair
- Irshad as Murukan
- Sona Nair as Anna
- Reena
- Sivaji as Ramabhadran
- P. Sreekumar as Chavaro
- Raji Menon as Clara, as Dany's first wife

== Awards ==
National Film Awards

- Best Feature Film in Malayalam - T. V. Chandran

Kerala State Film Awards

- Best Director - T. V. Chandran
- Best Photography - K. G. Jayan
- Best Processing Lab - Chitranjali

Other awards

- John Abraham Award for Best Malayalam Film - T. V. Chandran
