= Alicinte Anveshanam =

Alicinte Anweshanam
- Poster
- Directed by: T. V. Chandran
- Written by: T. V. Chandran
- Produced by: T. V. Chandran
- Starring: Nilambur Balan; Jalaja; P. T. K. Mohamed; T. Ravindranath; Gangadharan Chemmangatt; Nedumudi Venu
- Cinematography: Sunny Joseph
- Edited by: Venugopal
- Release date: 1989
- Running time: 122 minutes
- Country: India
- Language: Malayalam

Alicinte Anveshanam (English: The Search of Alice) is a 1989 Malayalam-language film written and directed by T. V. Chandran.The story revolves around a woman named Alice(Jalaja) who goes in search of her missing husband.

== Plot ==
Set in northern Kerala, the film narrates the journey of Alice in search of her missing husband, a college lecturer. During her quest, she slowly discovers disturbing aspects of her husband, including his descent from his earlier radicalism into bourgeois degeneracy. In the end she gives up her search and decides to take responsibility for her own life.

== Cast ==
- Surasu
- Nilambur Balan
- Jalaja as Alice
- Nedumudi Venu
- P. T. K. Mohamed
- T. Ravindranath
- Gangadharan Chemmangatt

== Credits ==
- Direction & Screenplay: T. V. Chandran
- Cast: Jalaja, Ravindranath, Nedumudi Venu, C. V. Sriraman
- Cinematography: Sunny Joseph
- Music: Ouseppachan

== Awards ==
It was nominated for the Golden Leopard at Locarno International Film Festival in 1990. It also won the Kerala State Film Award for Second Best Film in 1990.
