= Purooruvase =

- Directed by: Kaviyoor Sivaprasad
- Starring: Varanasi Narayanan Nampoothiri
- Cinematography: AR Sadanandan
- Music by: Anand Sankar
- Release date: 8 August 1985
- Country: India
- Language: Malayalam

Purooruvase is a 1985 Indian Malayalam film, directed by Kaviyoor Sivaprasad. The film stars and Varanasi Narayanan Nampoothiri in lead roles. The film had musical score by Anand Sankar.

== Cast ==
- Varanasi Narayanan Nampoothiri
