= Kozhikodan =

Indian film critic

- Born: K. Appukuttan Nair; 1925; Chembra, Palghat, Kerala, India
- Died: 2007 (aged 81–82); Kozhikode, Kerala, India
- Occupation: Film critic
- Writing career
- Language: Malayalam

K. Appukuttan Nair (1925–2007), better known as Kozhikodan, was a film critic and writer from Kerala, India. He began writing on films from the early 1950s. He started writing in Mathrubhumi and Chandrika, and later became a regular columnist of Mathrubhumi Illustrated Weekly along with Cynic and Nadirsha (T. M. P. Nedungadi). Kozhikodan received the Kerala State Film Award for Best Book on Cinema in 1988 for Chalathitraswadanam Engane? and the Kerala Sahitya Akademi Award (Humour) in 2010 for the poetry collection Padachonikku Salam. He died on 20 January 2007.

'Kozhikodan Smaraka Samiti' has instituted Kozhikodan Puraskaram, an award given annually to the best book on cinema in Malayalam.

== Works ==
=== Cinema ===
- Chalachitra Sallapam (DC Books, 1982)
- Chalachitra Niroopanam (NBS, 1984)
- Chalachitra Jalakom (Mathrubhumi,1985)
- Chalachitraswadanam Engane (PK Brothers, 1988)
- Sathyan Enna Natan (NBS, 1992)
- Malayala Cinema: Ente Premabhajanam (Poorna, 1999)
- Malayala Cinemayile Ekkalatheyum Ettavum Mikacha Pathu Chithrangal (Poorna, 2001)

=== Essays ===
- Navollekham (1966)
- Mahanaya Shikari (1973)
- Eshani Puranam (1988)

=== Humour ===
- Padachonikk Salaam (1998)

=== Children's literature ===
- Vado Njanum Koode Varaam (1986)
- Vadamalliyum Panineer Poovum (1992)
- Mahacharithamala – Two volumes (1983)
- Kuttikalkkoru Sammanam (2000)

== Selection ==
Kozhikodan lists the following ten films as the best ever in Malayalam cinema in one of his books.

- Swayamvaram (1972)
- Yavanika (1982)
- Sandhya Mayangum Neram (1983)
- Njan Gandharvan (1991)
- Vasthuhara (1991)
- Vembanad (1991)
- Aparahnam (1991)
- Kadavu (1991)
- Thenmavin Kombathu (1994)
- Ormakal Undayirikkanam (1995)
