= Susanna (2000 film) =

- Directed by: T. V. Chandran
- Written by: T. V. Chandran
- Produced by: T. V. Chandran
- Starring: Vani Viswanath; Bharath Gopi; Nedumudi Venu; Narendra Prasad; Charu Hassan; P. Sreekumar; M. R. Gopakumar; Urmila Unni; Madhupal; M. G. Sasi; Shivaji; Reshmi Soman
- Cinematography: K. G. Jayan
- Edited by: Venugopal
- Music by: Johnson
- Distributed by: Manoj, Shogun Films, Vinod Movies Release
- Release date: 2000
- Country: India
- Language: Malayalam

Susanna is a 2000 Malayalam film written, directed and produced by T. V. Chandran with Vani Viswanath in the title role. The film won two Kerala State Film Awards: Second Best Actress (Vani Viswanath) and Special Jury Mention (T. V. Chandran). It received the Padmarajan Award for Cinema in 2000. Susanna is widely regarded as the best performance by Vani Viswanath.

== Cast ==
- Vani Viswanath as Susanna
- P. Sreekumar as Planter Varkey
- Narendra Prasad as Prof. Noor Mohammad
- Charuhasan as Ramakrishna Iyer
- Bharath Gopi as Retd. High Commissioner K. P. Govardhanan Pillai
- Madhupal as Ramesan
- Mukundan as Thomachan
- M. R. Gopakumar
- M.G. Sasi
- Shivaji
- Nedumudi Venu as Colonel Ramachandran Nair
- Urmila Unni as Bhargavi
- K. B. Ganesh Kumar
- Murali as Josekutty
- Gopalakrishnan
- Prasanna Ravi
- Teena
- KG Chitranjali
- Remya
- Sudhiranjan
- Aliyar
- Reshmi Soman as Susanna's daughter
- Omana Ouseph
- Geetha Nair as Ramakrishna Iyer's wife

== Soundtrack ==
The music is composed by Johnson. Canadian poet and musician Leonard Cohen's "Suzanne" is played in the film.

- "English Song" - N/A
- "Himabinduvai Pirannu Ninmel" - Johnson

== Production ==
Mallika Sarabhai was also approached to play the role of Susanna.

== Reception ==
D. Jose of Rediff wrote, "Where this film — obviously produced on the thinnest of shoestrings — works is in the fact that, even as it tries to portray a power-packed woman as the central character, it does so without feminist ranting or the usual tears and pathos as Susanna stumbles from misery to misfortune."
