= M. G. Sasi =

Indian film director

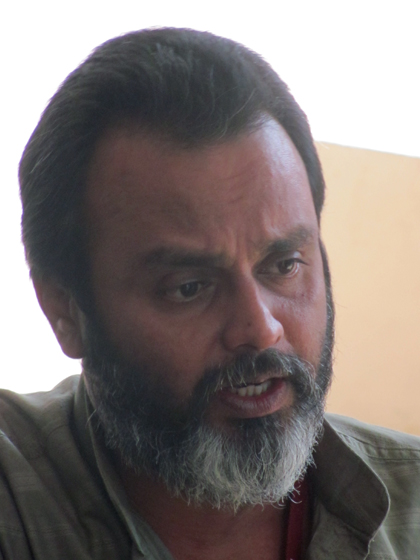
- M. G. Sasi
- Born: 17 January 1964 (age 62); Arangottukara, Palakkad, Kerala
- Occupations: Film director, Actor

M. G. Sasi (born 17 January 1964) is a film and drama director from Kerala. His short film Kanavumalayilekku received National Film Award for Best Educational Film in 2002. His first feature film Atayalangal (2008) received the Kerala State Film Awards for Best Film and Best Direction in 2007.

== Feature films ==
=== Director ===
- Adayalangal (2007)
- Janaki (2010), released in 2018
- Abimanini (film) (2019)

=== Actor ===
Year	Title	Role	Notes
1991	Venal Kinavukal	Dr. Balan	
1992	Sadayam	Samuel	
1997	Guru		
1997	Mangamma	Velayudhan	
1997	Kaliyattam		
1998	Sneham		
2000	Susanna		
2000	Shantham		
2009	Ritu	Hari Varma	
2013	Oru Indian Pranayakadha	Dr. Sunil Kumar	
2013	Pithavum Kanyakayum	Balachandran	
2013	Aatakadha	Parameshwaran	
2014	Njangalude Veettile Athidhikal		
2015	Ennum Eppozhum		
2015	Utopiayile Rajavu	Advocate	
2016	Jalam		
2018	Njan Prakashan	Doctor Varghese	

Short films

- A Knife in the Bar (2012)
- ICU (2013)

== Television ==
Year	Title	Role	Channel	Notes
2016	Nilavum Nakshtrangalum		Amrita TV	
2024– 2026	Pavithram	Sreekaryam Srinivasan	Asianet	
2026– present	Pavithram 2	Sreekaryam Srinivasan	JioHotstar	
