= Mangamma (film) =

- Directed by: T. V. Chandran
- Written by: T. V. Chandran
- Produced by: NFDC
- Starring: Revathi; Nedumudi Venu; Vijayaraghavan; Thilakan
- Cinematography: Sunny Joseph
- Edited by: Venugopal
- Music by: Johnson
- Release date: 14 November 1997
- Running time: 102 minutes
- Country: India
- Language: Malayalam

Mangamma is a 1997 Malayalam film written and directed by T. V. Chandran, and produced by National Film Development Corporation of India (NFDC). It stars Revathi, Nedumudi Venu, Vijayaraghavan and Thilakan in major roles.

The film met with critical acclaim. T. V. Chandran won the Kerala State Film Award for Best Director. The film won the National Film Award for Best Feature Film in Malayalam. Revathi's performance is widely regarded as one of the best in her career.

== Cast ==
- Revathi as Mangamma
- Nedumudi Venu as Nair
- Vijayaraghavan as Balan, Mangamma's ex-lover
- Thilakan as Karuppan Mooppar, Mangamma's father
- M. G. Sasi as Velayudhan, Nair's adopted son
- Oduvil Unnikrishnan as Mannadiyar
- Anitha as Sundari, Mangamma's younger sister(Voice By Bhagyalekshmi)
- Gopakumar as Varghese Mapla, Nair's friend
- V. K. Sriraman as contractor
- Jagadeesh
- Ravi Vallathol as Dr. M. S. Menon
- James

Other major characters are

- Sankaran, Nair and Mangamma's son
- Licy, Varghese Mapla's daughter
- Kuttisankara Menon, the wicked landlord and MLA
- Prasad, Kuttisankara Menon's son
