= Bhavam =

- Directed by: Sathish Menon
- Starring: Murali Menon, Jyothirmayi
- Edited by: B. Ajithkumar
- Release date: 24 May 2002
- Country: India
- Language: Malayalam

Bhavam is a 2002 Indian Malayalam film, directed by Sathish Menon, starring Murali Menon and Jyothirmayi in the lead role.

== Plot synopsis ==
Journalist Joy and his professor wife, Latha, live a comfortable if unremarkable life in coastal India. When Latha's sister, Subadra, unexpectedly arrives, the strain on Joy and Latha's troubled marriage is further exacerbated by this new development. Seemingly on the run from a murder investigation, Subadra draws Joy's attention away from Latha. Joy also struggles with his employer, who is linked to a company suspected of poisoning a water supply.

== Cast ==
- Jyothirmayi as Latha
- Murali Menon as Joy
- Siddique as Matthew
- Ambika Mohan as Teacher
- Irshad as Shyam
- Mita Vasisht as Subadra
- Vijayan Peringodu as MD
- Sindhu Biju as News Presenter
- Koothatukulam Leela as Kochamma
- K.M. Thomas as Krishnan Nair
- Bhavani Amma as Kalyani
- Chandrika Das as Doctor
- Johnson Manjali as Krishnanandan

== Awards ==
- Kerala State Film Award for Best Film – Sathish Menon
- Kerala State Film Award for Best Debut Director – Sathish Menon
- Kerala State Film Award for Second Best Actress – Jyothirmayi
- Kerala State Film Award for Best Editor – B. Ajithkumar
- Kerala State Film Award for Best Background Music – Isaac Thomas Kottukapally and
- National Film Award – Special Jury Award – Jyothirmayi
