= Boomi Malayalam =

Bhoomi Malayalam
- Directed by: T. V. Chandran
- Written by: T. V. Chandran
- Produced by: Revathi Chandran; V. P. Abeesh
- Starring: Padmapriya; Suresh Gopi; Samvrutha Sunil
- Cinematography: K. G. Jayan
- Edited by: Venugopal
- Music by: Isaac Thomas Kottukapally
- Release date: 1 May 2009
- Country: India
- Language: Malayalam

Bhoomi Malayalam is a 2009 Malayalam film directed by T. V. Chandran. The film features Suresh Gopi in a dual role along with Nedumudi Venu, Samvrutha Sunil, Padmapriya, and other actors. The film won the Kerala State Film Award for Second Best Film in 2008. It also won the John Abraham Award for Best Malayalam Film in 2008.

Bhoomi Malayalam depicts the plight of seven different women, each of whom represents different periods. Starting from the early 1980s, the film moves down to the present era.

== Plot ==
The movie recounts an incident that took place in Thillenkeri in Kannur district on 1948 April 15. The Communist Party was struggling against the rule of Jawaharlal Nehru at that period. In Thillenkeri, comrade Ananthan Master was the leader of the Communist Party.

He was shot dead while leading a demonstration against feudals. His wife Meenakshi was pregnant at that time and later gave birth to a baby girl Janaki Amma. Janaki Amma's son is Narayanan Kutty. From the first generation Ananthan to third generation Narayanan Kutty, the film attempts to capture the fear that has been pervading the life of women living in different periods, at different places.

== Cast ==
- Suresh Gopi in a dual role as:
  - Ananthan
  - Narayanan Kutty
- Nedumudi Venu
- Arun as Rahul
- Samvrutha Sunil as Nirmala
- Padmapriya as Fousia
- Priyanka Nair as Annie
- Lakshmi Sharma
- Manikandan Pattambi
- Jishnu Kollan Valappil as 8th ranker
- Kripa as Sathi
- Nanda
- Jasna
- Lakshmipriya

== See also ==
- Malayalam films of 2009
