= Chidambaram (film) =

1985 film by G. Aravindan

- Promotional poster
- Directed by: G. Aravindan
- Screenplay by: G. Aravindan
- Story by: C. V. Sreeraman
- Produced by: G. Aravindan
- Starring: Bharath Gopi; Smita Patil; Sreenivasan; Mohan Das
- Cinematography: Shaji N. Karun
- Music by: G. Devarajan
- Production company: Sooryakanthi
- Distributed by: Saj Movies
- Release date: 8 March 1985
- Running time: 100 min
- Country: India
- Language: Malayalam

Chidambaram. is a 1985 Malayalam film written, directed and produced by G. Aravindan. It is the film adaptation of a short story by C. V. Sreeraman. The film explores various aspects of relations between men and women through the lives of three people living in a cattle farm. Themes of guilt and redemption are also dealt with. Bharath Gopi, Smita Patil, Sreenivasan and Mohan Das play the lead roles. It won the National Film Award for Best Feature Film and five Kerala State Film Awards including Best Film and Best Direction.

== Plot ==
On a vast government-own farm situated in the Western Ghats, on the border of Kerala and Tamil Nadu, Muniyandi, a worker who tends to the farm's cattle, tells the superintendent, Shankaran that he is getting married and that he needs money. Shankaran agrees, but Jacob, the supervisor under him, is not particularly excited. He demands that Muniyandi return to the farm as soon as his wedding is over. Shankaran invites Muniyandi to drink with him, and when Jacob shows up, him as well; Jacob refuses, taking offense at drinking in the company of a "menial". Muniyandi falls at Shankaran's feet and sings a song about Shiva in repentance.

Shankaran travels to Muniyandi's village to attend the wedding and volunteers to take pictures. The couple go back to the farm on a bullock cart and then a jeep. Shivakami, Muniyandi's wife, is astounded by the lush landscape of Kerala. She discovers a flower garden and eagerly tells Muniyandi about her exploration of the farm. He takes it poorly, implying to Shivakami that she shouldn't wander the farm without him. Later, she decides to write a letter back home and approaches Shankaran to write the address on the envelope in English. Shankaran takes pictures of Shivakami, who gives up her typical reservations.

The actors Nedumudi Venu and Innocent show up at the farm for an event. Shankaran throws a picnic for them, which Jacob joins. Jacob passes a remark on Shivakami's character, which enrages Shankaran, who tries to punch Jacob.

Against Muniyandi's wishes, Jacob gives Shivakami a job in the estate's hay-making unit and moves Muniyandi's own shift to the night. That night, Muniyandi is startled by the sound of a motorbike heading towards the hay-making unit. Suspecting that Shivakami is cheating on him with Jacob, he goes in to check, only to find that it is his trusted Shankaran instead. Overcome with deception, he slashes Shivakami's face and hangs himself.

Shankaran runs away from the estate and ends up in the house of two of his colleagues. They do not understand what has happened. He eventually leaves and goes to the city where he becomes an alcoholic and finds a job in a printing press. His alcoholism eventually gets to his liver, at which point his doctor advises him to become religious to cure his addiction. After his attempts at reading Hindu scripture ends in vain, his doctor tells him to go on pilgrimages.

On a visit to the Thillai Nataraja Temple, Chidambaram, Shankaran finds Shivakami, her face slashed, now living off alms.

== Cast ==
- Bharath Gopi as Shankaran
- Sreenivasan as Muniyaandi
- Smita Patil as Shivakaami (Voice dubbed by Durga Sundararajan)
- Innocent as himself
- Nedumudi Venu as himself
- Murali as Cheriyan
- Dr Mohandas as Jacob
- James (Malayalam actor) as Johnson

== Soundtrack ==
The music was composed by G. Devarajan.

No.	Song	Singers	Lyrics	Length (m:ss)
1	Aattilepokum thanni	Seerkazhi Shivachidambaram		
2	Anithinudai (Bit)		Traditional	
3	Marghazhi (Bit)		Traditional	
4	Thalir	P. Madhuri	Traditional	
5	Thonda randum	P. Madhuri		
6	Unnamulai umayaalodum	P. Madhuri		

== Production ==
Aravindan wanted to make a film adaptation of the story written by C. V. Sreeraman. For three years he unsuccessfully tried to get a producer for the project. Then he decided to produce the film himself. The film was made with a tight budget. Filming was primarily held in Mattupetty, near Munnar in Idukki District.

=== Casting ===
Unlike earlier films directed by Aravindan, Chidambaram featured a cast consisting of many popular actors. Smitha Patil, who had expressed her desire to work with Aravindan and Gopy joined the project. More actors came forward after learning that Aravindan is producing the film himself. According to Aravindan, "Smita Patil had expressed her desire to act in one of my films much before this. Gopi was also willing to come. When they learned that it is my own production, many artists came forward to help. No one acted in the film expecting any financial returns from me. They did it for me."

== Themes ==
The film's two halves deal with two different major themes. The first half primarily explores man-woman relations. Even though Shivakami is loved by Muniyandi, she is drawn towards a more charismatic Shankaran. Shankaran is not too serious about his relation with Shivakami. According to Aravindan, "Shankaran's affinity to Shivakami at best is an infatuation. May be that is why he was unprepared and unable to face up to the eventualities." The second half concentrates on Shankaran's response to the events after he runs away from the farm, and it deals with the themes of guilt and redemption. Then there are minor themes such as fading of caste barriers, represented by Shankaran with his relaxed attitude towards people from lower castes, like Muniyandi and Shivakami.

Chidambaram is a temple town located in Tamil Nadu. Shankaran finds Shivakami at Chidambaram in the end of his journey. The legend of Chidambaram temple revolves around a dance contest held between Lord Shiva and Goddess Kali. Kali, the reigning goddess of Thillai forest near Chidambaram witnessed the Ananda Thandava (dance of bliss, as depicted in the famous Nataraja posture) by Shiva and challenged him to a contest. Shiva, wishing to eliminate her arrogance agreed under the condition that whoever wins would become the Lord of Thillai. During the contest, Shiva performed the Urdhva Tandava (one leg pointed straight up), which Kali couldn't perform. Some legends suggest she was unable to do it out of modesty, and Shiva deliberately performed it with Kali's gender in mind. However, Kali conceded defeat, felt guilt for her arrogance and became a devotee for Shiva. Shankaran, the name of the protagonist is another name of Shiva. The name Shivakami means either one who loves Shiva or one who is loved by Shiva and is the name of the female deity in the Chidambaram Temple. The uneven relationship between Shiva and Kali is reflected in the relationship between Shankaran and Shivakami as well.

Various Shaivite musical pieces can be found in the movie's background. Gopalakrishna Bharati's kritis "Margazhi Matham Thiruvathirai Naal" in Navroj, "Vazhi Maraithirikkudu" in Todi, and "Sivaloganathanai Kandu" in Mayamalavagowla, and the Thevaram hymn "Thondar Anju Kalirum Adakki" (which discusses the Kedarnath Temple) are featured in the first half.

== Reception ==
Chidambaram was met with critical acclaim upon its release. Film critic Bikram Singh wrote, "Chidambaram is without doubt Aravindan’s best film. The richness of visuals here surpasses even those in Pokkuveyil, the suggestion of the inscrutable mystery at the heart of human affairs is conveyed unambiguously than in Estheppan. If it were to be narrated in a few words, the story of Chidambaram would sound banal. It takes a genius to turn it into an occasion for solemn reflection upon love, life, nature and death." Several renowned critics like Iqbal Masud and Ravindran praised the film.

Chidambaram, unlike Aravindan's earlier films was a commercial success. He attributed the popularity of the film to a "sustained story line" and the casting of well-known cine artistes. However, Aravindan himself was surprised at the film's success and was often critical of the film saying that, " I don't know why people like the film so much, it isn't that great of a film. It isn't even my best work."

== Awards ==
Year	Nominee / work	Award	Result
1985	G. Aravindan	National Film Award for Best Feature Film	Won
1985	G. Aravindan	Kerala State Film Award for Best Director	Won
1985	G. Aravindan	Kerala State Film Award for Best Film	Won
1985	Bharath Gopi	Kerala State Film Award for Best Actor	Won
1985	G. Devarajan	Kerala State Film Award for Best Music Director	Won
