= Kerala State Film Award for Best Director =

Annual Indian film award

- State award for contributions to Malayalam cinema
- Awarded for: Award for excellence in direction
- Sponsored by: Kerala State Chalachitra Academy
- First award: 1969
- Final award: 2024
- Most recent winner: Chidambaram S. Poduval (Manjummel Boys)

Highlights
- Total awarded: 54
- First winner: A. Vincent ( Nadhi )

The Kerala State Film Award for Best Director has been presented annually at the Kerala State Film Awards of India since 1969. It is given to a film director who has exhibited outstanding direction while working in the Malayalam film industry. Until 1997, the awards were managed directly by the Department of Cultural Affairs of the Government of Kerala. Since 1998, the Kerala State Chalachitra Academy, an autonomous non-profit organisation functioning under the Department of Cultural Affairs, has been exercising control over the awards. The recipients are decided by an independent jury formed by the academy. They are declared by the Minister for Cultural Affairs and are presented by the Chief Minister.

The first Kerala State Film Awards ceremony was held in 1970 with cinematographer-director A. Vincent receiving the Best Director award for his work in Nadhi (1969). Throughout the years, accounting for ties and repeat winners, the Government of Kerala has presented a total of 50 best director awards to 25 different filmmakers. The recipients receive a figurine, a certificate, and a cash prize of ₹2 lakh (US$2,100). (Note: The average exchange rate in 2019 was 68.53 Indian rupees (₹) per 1 US dollar (US$))

G. Aravindan is the most frequent winner in this category with seven awards. He is followed by Adoor Gopalakrishnan (six awards), Shyamaprasad (five awards), K. S. Sethumadhavan (four awards) and Blessy (three awards). As of 2023, five directors—Shaji N. Karun, M. T. Vasudevan Nair, T. V. Chandran, Hariharan and Lijo Jose Pellissery— have won the award twice in their careers. The academy did not present the award at the 2002 ceremony. Vidhu Vincent was the first female director to win the award in 2016, for her debut film Manhole. The most recent recipient was Chidambaram S. Poduval, who received the award for his film Manjummel Boys in 2024.

== Winners ==
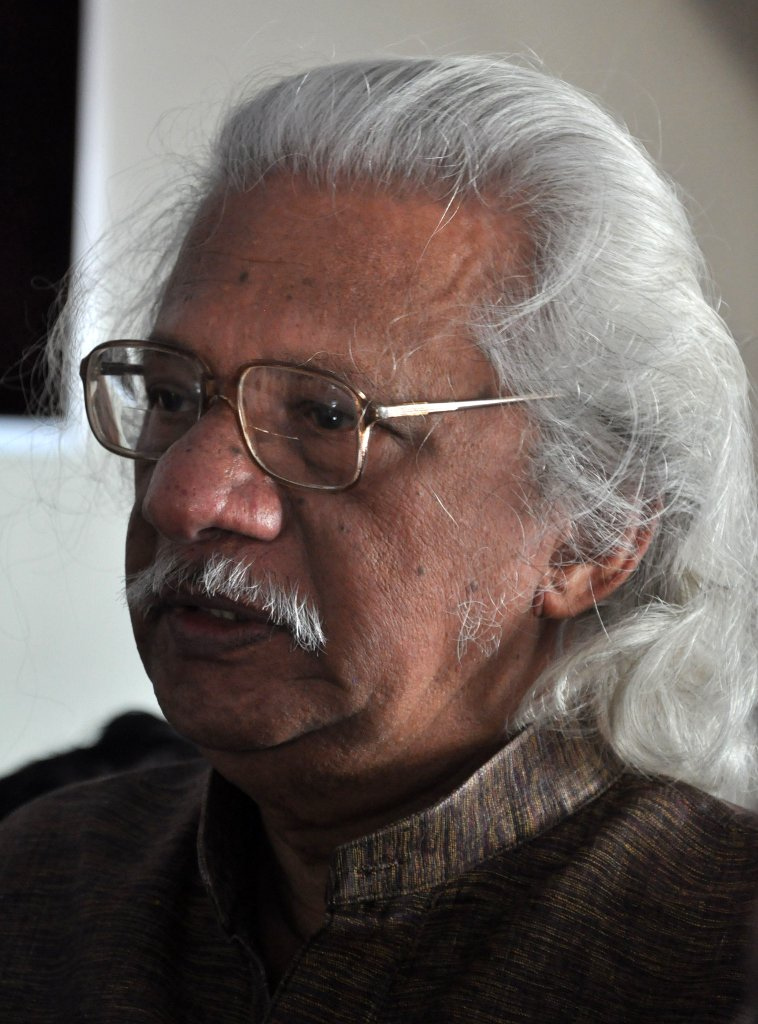
Adoor Gopalakrishnan and Aravindan has won the award six times.

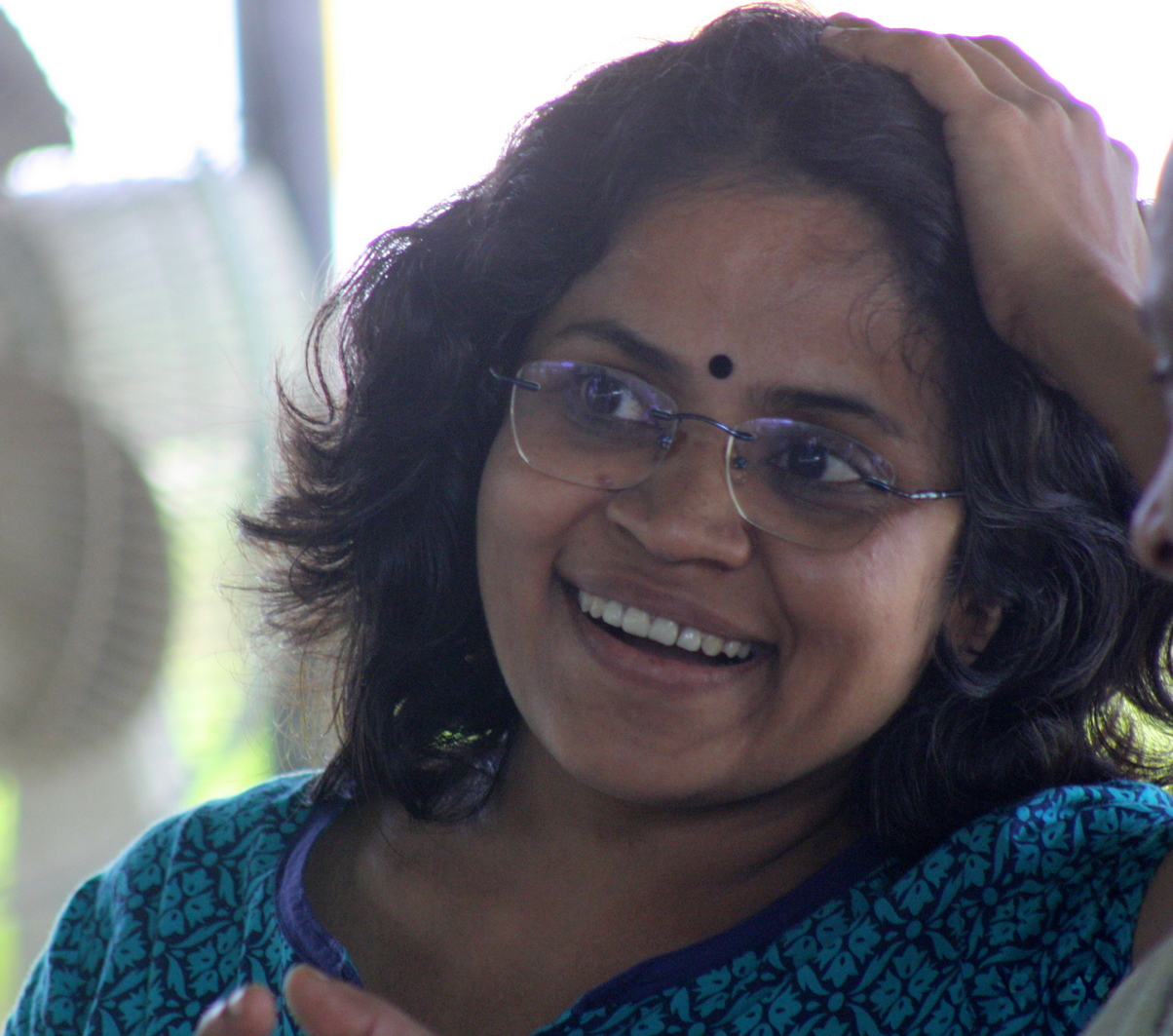
Vidhu Vincent is the only woman to receive the award.

List of award recipients, showing the year and film(s)
| Year | Recipient | Film | Ref. |
|---|---|---|---|
| 1969 | A. Vincent | Nadhi | |
| 1970 | K. S. Sethumadhavan | Aranazhika Neram | |
| 1971 | K. S. Sethumadhavan | Karakanakadal | |
| 1972 | K. S. Sethumadhavan | Panitheeratha Veedu | |
| 1973 | M. T. Vasudevan Nair | Nirmaalyam | |
| 1974 | G. Aravindan | Uttarayanam | |
| 1975 | P. A. Backer | Kabani Nadi Chuvannappol | |
| 1976 | T. Rajeevnath | Thanal | |
| 1977 | Adoor Gopalakrishnan | Kodiyettam | |
| 1978 | G. Aravindan | Thampu | |
| 1979 | G. Aravindan | Esthappan | |
| 1980 | K. S. Sethumadhavan | Oppol | |
| 1981 | G. Aravindan | Pokkuveyil | |
| 1982 | Bharathan | Marmaram | |
| 1983 | Fazil | Ente Mamattukkuttiyammakku | |
| 1984 | Adoor Gopalakrishnan | Mukhamukham | |
| 1985 | G. Aravindan | Chidambaram | |
| 1986 | G. Aravindan | Oridathu | |
| 1987 | Adoor Gopalakrishnan | Anantaram | |
| 1988 | K. P. Kumaran | Rugmini | |
| 1989 | I. V. Sasi | Mrugaya | |
| 1990 | G. Aravindan | Vasthuhara | |
| 1991 | Kamal | Ulladakkam | |
| 1992 | Hariharan | Sargam | |
| 1993 | Adoor Gopalakrishnan | Vidheyan | |
| 1994 | Shaji N. Karun | Swaham | |
| 1995 | Adoor Gopalakrishnan | Kathapurushan | |
| 1996 | Jayaraj | Desadanam | |
| 1997 | T. V. Chandran | Mangamma | |
| 1998 | Shyamaprasad | Agnisakshi | |
| 1999 | Shaji N. Karun | Vanaprastham | |
| 2000 | M. T. Vasudevan Nair | Oru Cheru Punchiri | |
| 2001 | T. V. Chandran | Dany | |
| 2002 | No winner | | |
| 2003 | Sibi Malayil | Ente Veedu Appuvinteyum | |
| 2004 | Shyamaprasad | Akale | |
| 2005 | Blessy | Thanmathra | |
| 2006 | Lenin Rajendran | Rathri Mazha | |
| 2007 | M. G. Sasi | Atayalangal | |
| 2008 | Adoor Gopalakrishnan | Oru Pennum Randaanum | |
| 2009 | Hariharan | Kerala Varma Pazhassi Raja | |
| 2010 | Shyamaprasad | Elektra | |
| 2011 | Blessy | Pranayam | |
| 2012 | Lal Jose | Ayalum Njanum Thammil | |
| 2013 | Shyamaprasad | Artist | |
| 2014 | Sanal Kumar Sasidharan | Oraalppokkam | |
| 2015 | Martin Prakkat | Charlie | |
| 2016 | Vidhu Vincent | Manhole | |
| 2017 | Lijo Jose Pellissery | Ee.Ma.Yau. | |
| 2018 | Shyamaprasad | Oru Njayarazhcha | |
| 2019 | Lijo Jose Pellissery | Jellikkettu | |
| 2020 | Sidhartha Siva | Ennivar | |
| 2021 | Dileesh Pothan | Joji | |
| 2022 | Mahesh Narayan | Ariyippu | |
| 2023 | Blessy | Aadujeevitham | |
| 2024 | Chidambaram S. Poduval | Manjummel Boys | |
