= Oridathu =

- Directed by: G. Aravindan
- Written by: G. Aravindan
- Starring: Nedumudi Venu; Sreenivasan; Thilakan; Vineeth; Krishnankutty Nair; Chandran Nair; Soorya
- Cinematography: Shaji N. Karun
- Edited by: K.R. Bose
- Music by: Hariprasad Chaurasia; Rajeev Taranath; Latif Ahmed
- Production company: Suryakanti Film Makers
- Release date: 29 May 1987
- Running time: 112 minutes
- Country: India
- Language: Malayalam

Oridathu (1987) is an Indian Malayalam satirical drama film written and directed by G. Aravindan. Nedumudi Venu, Sreenivasan, Thilakan, Vineeth, Krishnankutty Nair, Chandran Nair and Soorya form the cast. The story is about the problems faced by the people of a hamlet where electricity is unavailable when electric supply finally reaches there. The film reaches the conclusion that life is better without electricity. The indefinability of the human mind is the theme of the film. Though the film is discussing a serious issue, the treatment of it is very simplistic. Humour and intensity characterise the film that is set in the mid-fifties. The film is different from many of Aravindan's earlier works in that it deals with a broad range of characters and lacks a clear-cut linear story. It became a major critical success and earned the best director awards for Aravindan at the state and national film awards.

== Plot ==
The time is the mid-1950s when the Indian states were being reorganised. The place is a remote village in Kerala. There is a palpable hum of excitement as the village Panchayath, led by the Brahmin landlord (M. S. Thripunithura), is determined to bring the benefits of electricity to this backward place.

As the story unfolds, it introduces an array of characters in the village: the Communist tailor (Krishnankutty Nair) given to fiery speeches, laced with quotations; the landlord's manager Raman (Thilakan); Kuttan, the odd job man, hitching his star to the influential newcomers; the wise school teacher, the adolescent boy Josekutty and girl; and the braggart overseer. Families and groups are deftly sketched with a cartoonist's sharp eye. Each group has its own story to tell, in self-contained episodes that are all interrelated. The vela or the festival of the local temple is a symbol of the harmony that prevailed in the village in those pre-electricity days.

After the executive engineer from the Electricity, Department has surveyed the place with becoming solemnity, there follows a flurry of activity. The overseer, flatteringly called engineer by the villagers who do not know the distinction, has an eye for the girls. Kuttan, the man for all jobs, becomes the overseer's faithful servitor. He induces the girl he hopes to marry to join the electricity workforce. A doctor following in the wake of electricity sets up a dispensary in the village. Kuttan decides he is a more prestigious master to serve.

The village soon stops treating the overseer with awe. He displays a taste for the arts and theatricals, forms an amateur group and earnestly begins rehearsing for a romantic play about separated lovers. Young Jose plays the heroine's role. Jose is a bright, ambitious boy who plans to leave the village to work outside Kerala, once the coming festival is over.

Disenchantment with electricity is gradual. The location of the electric pole makes old friends and neighbours fall out. There are dire omens of death. At first, crows are electrocuted atop the wire, then a cow fell in a huddle. Death also comes to Kuttan's girlfriend who is pregnant. Kuttan cannot afford to support her, and abortion seems the only way out. Next morning, her dead body is found in the temple pond. The doctor, who has finalised marriage negotiations with the manager's daughter is unmasked - as a quack and a would-be bigamist to boot. Kuttan's simple trust is betrayed by the overseer who seduces his sister.

Before the larger calamity strikes, there is a symbolic burial of the beautiful temple lamppost, whose wick was ceremonially lit every evening. Its gentle glow has now been replaced by harsh electric glare. The story moves inexorably to its culmination. At the temple festival every year, Kuttan traditionally dons the vestments of the Kali, the avenging goddess. He decides to wreak vengeance on the overseer who he sees as the root cause of all calamities in the village. But in the clash, it is young Jose, who gets electrocuted. The cry of the innocent victim is drowned by the pyrotechnical dazzle of the festival fireworks, which are sparked off in the melee — a parable of nuclear holocaust. The frame freezes on a parachuting mannikin headed for the earth, arms outstretched as if in crucifixion.

== Cast ==
- Nedumudi Venu as Sundaresan, the electrical overseer
- Sreenivasan as Kuttan
- Thilakan as Raman, the Manager
- Vineeth as Jose "Josekutty"
- M. S. Thripunithura
- Sithara as Rema
- Innocent (actor) as Doctor Rajashekharan Pillai / Rajappan
- Cuckoo Parameswaran
- Krishnankutty Nair as Comrade Haridas
- Chandran Nair as School teacher
- Kunjandi as Thomas "Thomachan", Josekutty's father
- Valsala Menon as Rema's mother
- Zeenath
- Soorya as Kuttan's girlfriend

== Themes ==
The indefinability of the human mind is the theme of the film. The theme is introduced by depicting the story of electrification of a village and the changes this introduces in the village. Unlike Aravindan's previous films, humour and intensity characterise Oridathu. When asked about this deviation, Aravindan stated, "There is an element of caricature in all the characters. A little exaggeration and lot of humour were consciously introduced to make the last sequence effective, which is the explosion. In fact, the whole film moves towards the climax — the clash on the day of the festival and the breaking out of the fire."

The film is complex in that it has many characters and many incidents and therefore does not have a single motif. Hence, Aravindan had to use a number of shots in the film. The usual type of music is also absent. Instead, the sounds of the incidents are used to the maximum. In the film, different characters speak different dialects of Malayalam, for example, the villagers speak pure Valluvanadan Malayalam of South Malabar, the overseer uses the Trivandrum Malayalam the fake Doctor uses Travancore Malayalam etc.

== Development ==
Oridathu can be seen as a continuation of Aravindan's earlier film Thampu (The Circus Tent, 1978) and his cartoon series Cheriya Manushyarum Valiya Lokavum (The Small Man and the Big World). Thampu, shot in black and white in a direct documentary mode, dealt with the roving street circus of Kerala. Cheriya Manushyarum Valiya Lokavum, published in Mathrubhumi for several years, dealt with the adventures of the central characters Ramu and Guruji, mingled with political and social satires. The theme of Oridathu demanded a caricature treatment so Aravindan made it that way. The film is often described as "Ambiguous Humour Confronted by Modernisation". Aravindan says that the film is not against modernisation. In an interview, the director said, "My film is not against modernisation. I was trying to look at the changes taking place in the life of the people and the village. I still fear one day that technology will take over. I was born in a small village and up to the age of ten, I hadn't seen the electricity. I still remember with nostalgia those times, when people moved through the night with burning flares. When electricity came, they went out".

== Major awards ==
- National Film Award for Best Direction
- Kerala State Film Award for Best Film
- Kerala State Film Award for Best Director
