= Kerala State Film Award for Best Film =

Indian film award

- Awarded for: Best film in Malayalam cinema
- Sponsored by: Kerala State Chalachitra Academy
- Reward: ₹400,000 (US$4,300)
- First award: 1969
- Final award: 2024
- Most recent winner: Manjummel Boys

Highlights
- First winner: Kumara Sambhavam (1969)
- Website: keralafilm.com

The Kerala State Film Award for Best Film is an award presented annually at the Kerala State Film Awards of India to the best film in Malayalam cinema. The awards are managed directly by the autonomous Kerala State Chalachitra Academy, which works under the Department of Cultural Affairs of the Government of Kerala.

== Winners ==
Year	Film	Director	Producer	Ref.
1969	Kumara Sambhavam	P. Subramaniam	P. Subramaniam	
1970	Olavum Theeravum	P. N. Menon	P. A. Backer	
1971	Sarasayya	Thoppil Bhasi	P. V. Sathyan	
1972	Panitheeratha Veedu	K. S. Sethumadhavan	Chithrakalakendram	
1973	Nirmalyam	M. T. Vasudevan Nair	M. T. Vasudevan Nair	
1974	Uttarayanam	G. Aravindan	Pattathuvila Karunakaran	
1975	Swapnadanam	K. G. George	T. Mohammed Bappu	
1976	Manimuzhakkam	P. A. Backer	Cartoonist Thomas	
1977	Kodiyettam	Adoor Gopalakrishnan	Kulathoor Bhaskaran Nair	
1978	Ashwathama	K. R. Mohanan	P. T. Kunju Muhammed	
1978	Bandhanam	M. T. Vasudevan Nair	V. B. K. Menon	
1979	Esthappan	G. Aravindan	K. Ravindranathan Nair	
1980	Oppol	K. S. Sethumadhavan	Ms. Rosamma George	
1981	Elippathayam	Adoor Gopalakrishnan	K. Ravindranathan Nair	
1982	Marmaram	Bharathan	N. N. Films	
1982	Yavanika	K. G. George	Henry	
1983	Ente Mamattikkuttiyammakku	Fazil	M. C. Punnus	
1984	Mukhamukham	Adoor Gopalakrishnan	K. Ravindranathan Nair	
1985	Chidambaram	G. Aravindan	G. Aravindan	
1986	Oridathu	G. Aravindan	G. Aravindan	
1987	Purushartham	K. R. Mohanan	P. T. Kunju Muhammed	
1988	Ore Thooval Pakshikal	Chintha Ravi	Chintha Ravi	
1989	Vadakkunokkiyantram	Sreenivasan	Tophi Kannaara, T. C. Moni	
1990	Vasthuhara	G. Aravindan	T. Ravindranath	
1991	Kadavu	M. T. Vasudevan Nair	M. T. Vasudevan Nair	
1992	Daivathinte Vikrithikal	Lenin Rajendran	Lenin Rajendran	
1993	Vidheyan	Adoor Gopalakrishnan	K. Ravindranathan Nair	
1994	Parinayam	Hariharan	G. P. Vijayakumar	
1995	Kazhakam	M. P. Sukumaran Nair	M. P. Sukumaran Nair	
1996	No award			
1997	Bhoothakkannadi	Lohithadas	N. Krishnakumar	
1998	Agnisakshi	Shyama Prasad	V. V. Babu	
1999	Karunam	Jayaraj	Jayaraj	
2000	Sayahnam	R. Sarath	M. S. Nazeer	
2001	Sesham	T. K. Rajeev Kumar	Latha Kurian Rajeev, K. Madhavan	
2002	Bhavam	Sathish Menon	Sathish Menon	
2003	Margam	Rajeev Vijayaraghavan	Rajeev Vijayaraghavan	
2004	Akale	Shyamaprasad	Tom George	
2005	Thanmathra	Blessy	Raju Mathew	
2006	Drishtantham	M. P. Sukumaran Nair	M. P. Sukumaran Nair	
2007	Atayalangal	M. G. Sasi	Aravind Venugopal	
2008	Oru Pennum Randaanum	Adoor Gopalakrishnan	Adoor Gopalakrishnan, Benzy Martin	
2009	Paleri Manikyam: Oru Pathirakolapathakathinte Katha	Ranjith	A. V. Anoop, Maha Subair	
2010	Adaminte Makan Abu	Salim Ahamed	Salim Ahamed, Ashraf Bedi	
2011	Indian Rupee	Ranjith	Santhosh Sivan, Prithviraj Sukumaran, Shaji Nadeshan	
2012	Celluloid	Kamal	Kamal, Ubaid	
2013	CR No: 89	Sudevan	Pace Productions	
2014	Ottaal	Jayaraj	K Mohanan, Vinod Vijayan	
2015	Ozhivudivasathe Kali	Sanal Kumar Sasidharan	Niv Art Movies	
2016	Manhole	Vidhu Vincent	MP Vincent	
2017	Ottamuri Velicham	Rahul Riji Nair	Rahul Riji Nair	
2018	Kanthan - The Lover of Colour	Shareef Easa	Shareef Eesa	
2019	Vasanthi	Shinos Rahman, Sajas Rahman	Siju Wilson	
2020	The Great Indian Kitchen	Jeo Baby	Dijo Augustine, Jomon Jacob, Vishnu Rajan, Sajin S Raj	
2021	Aavasavyuham	Krishand R. K.	Krishand R. K.	
2022	Nanpakal Nerathu Mayakkam	Lijo Jose Pellissery	Mammootty Kampany	
2023	Kaathal – The Core	Jeo Baby	Mammootty Kampany	
2024	Manjummel Boys	Chidambaram S. Poduval	Soubin Shahir, Babu Shahir, Shawn Antony	

== See also ==
- Kerala State Film Award for Second Best Film
