= K. Ravindranathan Nair =

Indian film producer (1933–2023)

Krishna Ravindranathan Nair
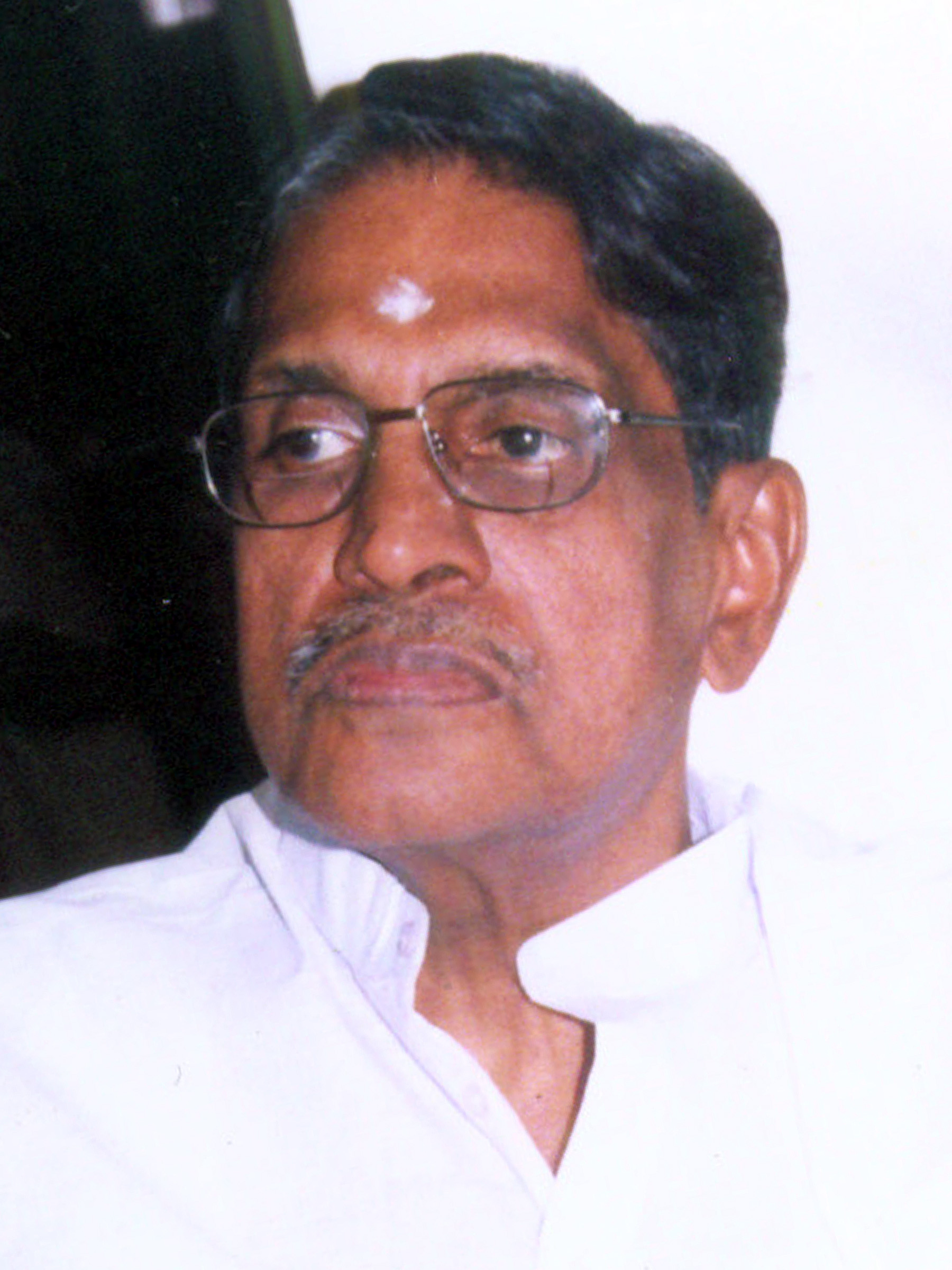
- Born: 3 July 1933; Kollam, Travancore
- Died: 8 July 2023 (aged 90)
- Other names: Achani Ravi; General Pictures Ravi
- Occupation: Film producer
- Years active: 1967–2023
- Spouse: Usha Ravi
- Children: 3
- Father: Krishna Pillai
- Awards: J. C. Daniel Award; National Film Award; Kerala State Film Award
- Website: Official web site

Krishna Ravindranathan Nair (3 July 1933 – 8 July 2023), also known as Achani Ravi or General Pictures Ravi, was an Indian film producer of Malayalam films, industrialist and philanthropist. He was known for a number of critically acclaimed films he produced, such as Kanchana Sita, Thampu, Kummatty, Esthappan, Pokkuveyil, Elippathayam, Manju, Mukhamukham, Anantaram and Vidheyan. Nair was credited with fostering the art film movement in Malayalam cinema during the period from the 1970s to the 1990s. A multiple recipient of National and State film awards, Nair was awarded the J. C. Daniel Award by the Government of Kerala, in 2008, for his contributions to Malayalam cinema.

== Biography ==
K. Ravindran Nair was the fifth son of Vendor Krishna Pillai, one of the cashew processing pioneers of Kerala. His passion for literature and arts brought him into Malayalam cinema and in 1967, he established General Pictures under the banner of which he produced his first movie, Anweshichu Kandethiyilla, directed by P. Bhaskaran. This was followed by two more films the next year, Kattukurangu and Lakshaprabhu, both directed by Bhaskaran. Ravi, as he is generally known, was silent for the next few years till he came out with his next film, Achani, an A. Vincent movie, in 1973, which earned him the moniker, Achani Ravi. The film was reported to be a commercial success like his earlier films and Ravi is known to have contributed the returns from the movie to building a Public Library in Kollam, of which he was a founder member and honorary secretary.

1977 marked a new chapter in Nair's life with the first of his films with the filmmaker G. Aravindan, Kanchana Sita releasing that year. This was followed by four more Aravindan films, Thampu (1978), Kummatty (1979), Esthappan (1979) and Pokkuveyil (1981). The next film he produced, Elippathayam (1981), was directed by Adoor Gopalakrishnan. Three more films, Mukhamukham (1984), Anantaram (1987) and Vidheyan (1993), with the same director were released in the ensuing years. In between, he also produced a film, Manju (1982) for the Jnanpith and National Film award winner, M. T. Vasudevan Nair.

Nair produced a total of 14 films for which he received 18 awards before he retired from cinema.

== Personal life and death ==
Usha Ravi, Nair's wife, was a playback singer having sung in movies such as Thampu, Aambal poovu and Detective 909. Usha died on 2 October 2013.

Nair died on 8 July 2023, at the age of 90.

== Filmography ==
Film	Year	Director	Awards
Anweshichu Kandethiyilla	1967	P. Bhaskaran	National Film Award
Kattukurangu	1968	P. Bhaskaran	-
Lakshaprabhu	1968	P. Bhaskaran	-
Achani	1973	A. Vincent	-
Kanchana Sita	1977	G. Aravindan	National Film Award for Best Direction
Thampu	1978	G. Aravindan	National Film Award
Kummatty	1979	G. Aravindan	Kerala State Film Award
Esthappan	1979	G. Aravindan	Kerala State Film Award
Pokkuveyil	1981	G. Aravindan	-
Elippathayam	1981	Adoor Gopalakrishnan	National Film Award; Kerala State Film Award
Manju	1982	M. T. Vasudevan Nair	-
Mukhamukham	1984	Adoor Gopalakrishnan	National Film Award
Anantaram	1987	Adoor Gopalakrishnan	National Film Award for Best Direction
Vidheyan	1993	Adoor Gopalakrishnan	National Film Award

== See also ==
- G. Aravindan
- Adoor Gopalakrishnan
- M. T. Vasudevan Nair
- P. Bhaskaran
- A. Vincent
