= Vasthuhara =

1991 film by G. Aravindan

- Directed by: G. Aravindan
- Screenplay by: G. Aravindan; Dialogues: C. V. Sreeraman; G. Aravindan; N. Mohanan
- Story by: C. V. Sreeraman
- Based on: Vasthuhara by C. V. Sreeraman
- Produced by: T. Ravindranath
- Starring: Mohanlal; Neena Gupta; Shobana; Neelanjana Mitra
- Cinematography: Sunny Joseph
- Edited by: K. R. Bose
- Music by: Salil Chowdhury
- Production company: Paragon Movie Makers
- Distributed by: Chandrakanth Release
- Release date: 3 June 1991
- Running time: 101 minutes
- Country: India
- Language: Malayalam

Vaasthuhara (transl. The dispossessed) is a 1991 Indian Malayalam-language social drama film written and directed by G. Aravindan. It is based on the short story of the same name by C. V. Sreeraman. The film looks into the lives of partition refugees from East Bengal to West Bengal. At a larger level, it's the universal story of refugees. The film stars Mohanlal, Neena Gupta, Neelanjana Mitra and Shobana. The dialogues were written by Sreeraman, Aravindan, and N. Mohanan.

The story is told through the eyes of Venu, a Malayali government officer send for a mission in Calcutta to rehabilitate refugees to the Andaman and Nicobar Islands. Vaasthuhara was released on 3 June 1991 to widespread critical acclaim. The film won the National Film Award for Best Feature Film in Malayalam and three Kerala State Film Awards—Best Film, Best Director, and Best Story (Sreeraman). Vasthuhara was the last work of Aravindan before his death.

== Plot ==
The film takes place in Calcutta in 1971. The story begins with rehabilitation official Venu (Mohanlal) coming to Calcutta on one of his regular visits to shift nearly 35 to 40 refugee families to the Andaman Islands. The current rehabilitation plan is for only those who fall under the category of scheduled caste farmers. People in Andaman, too, are not happy about taking in refugees. All the refugees have been staying in a Permanent Liability Camp in Rana Ghat, West Bengal, for the past two decades. Experiencing the shattered lives of poor displaced people deeply hurts Venu in his silent moments alone in his small lodge room. He frequently finds himself lost in the thoughts about the lives of the refuge seekers he meets during the day. Living an oppressed life, their only hope being the occasional promises of land, cattle, and other grants by the bureaucratic state.

Aravindan takes us closer into the life of a refugee when Venu realizes that the sorrow of one refugee family is his own. One day, an old lady, Arthi Panicker (Neelanjana Mitra), comes to meet Venu in his lodge. She speaks broken Malayalam which surprises Venu. She's a refugee from East Bengal. She desperately wants to move out of the wretched Calcutta for a better future for her children, a daughter (who's completed her MA but never appeared for the examination) and a son about whom she's sad. Her daughter Damayanti (Neena Gupta) quit her studies and is a communist revolutionary on parole. Venu realizes that they are no one but his own uncle's family, his uncle Kunjunni Panicker whom he admired so much. He was a poet and revolutionary who left home long back (probably to join Bose's INA) when Venu was a child.

Venu visits home in Kerala, a typical matrilineal Nair household, to discuss his chance meeting with Kunjunni uncle's family and also to secure their rightful share for them. Venu's mother has no sympathies for Arthi Panicker and her kids. Kunjunni uncle's land is in possession of Venu's aunt, Bhavani (Padmini), who, as a beautiful teenager, had loved Kunjunni. Venu remembers his childhood days when he used to run secret errands for a young Bhavani played by Shobana. Aunt Bhavani is more sympathetic towards Arthi. Having never met the wife and children of the man she once loved, she's curious about them. She agrees to give them the land or money, whatever is convenient to them. (One gets the impression that at the late time of her life, Bhavani is leading a lonely, guilt-ridden life, having destroyed the lives of both the brothers — she married Anandan who commits suicide, probably due to an unhappy marriage.)

Venu returns to Calcutta and reveals his identity to Aunt Arthi. She is pleasantly surprised; she and Damayanti finally feel a sense of security and belonging in their lives. But Arthi rejects the financial help from her husband's family who hadn't allowed her to enter the compound of the house when she visited them years back. Arthi narrates the humiliation of having to return on a hot summer afternoon from the locked gates of her husband's ancestral house, she and Kunjunni breaking down on their way back. Immediately after their return to East Bengal, the country gained independence and in the consequent partition, they sought refuge on the Indian side. Kunjunni dies of cholera in the refugee camp and a pregnant Arthi is left on her own in abject poverty, with two-year-old Damayanti by her side.

Venu meets Damayanti's brother who is also a communist revolutionary hiding from the police. Venu's arrival into their life brings long-lost hope and happiness. But it's short-lived as Venu has to return to the Andaman Islands with the selected refugees. As the rest of Calcutta celebrates Durga puja, a few bunch of refugee families are packed in the back of a goods truck and offloaded at the harbor. Arthi and Damayanti arrive at the harbor to see him off. Damayanti is not able to control her emotions and breaks down inconsolably as Venu hugs her, himself overcome by sadness. Arthi Panicker looks on emotionless, her face hardened by years of victimization.

The film ends tragically as Venu has to rush hastily into the ship about to depart, abruptly ending his goodbye to his uncle's family. As Venu rushes through the crowded stairways of the ship, a crying Damayanti shouts from behind, "Write to me Dada... Damayanti Panicker, Apilore Central Jail, Calcutta".

The ship moves towards Andaman, beginning a new journey, a new era for a few Vasthuharas, towards the green shores of a new promised land somewhere in the eastern islands, a land of new hope. But even as a handful of them find hope, another wave of exodus begins, which ends in the Indo-Pak Bangladesh liberation war in December 1971.

Displaced from their homes, unwanted outsiders in their land of refuge, doing sundry small-time jobs, working in abject conditions as bonded laborers, some wait to return to their land, some simply give up, and some others like Damayanti and her brother, become rebels.

== Cast ==
- Mohanlal as Venu
- Neelanjana Mitra as Arathi Panikkar
- Neena Gupta as Damayanthi
- Padmini as Bhavani
- Shobana as Young Bhavani
- Lakshmi Krishnamurthy as Devaki
- Shyama as Shantha
- N. L. Balakrishnan as Man at the Lodge
- C. V. Sreeraman

== Production ==
The film is based on the short story of the same name, written by C. V. Sreeraman. It was shot in Calcutta in 1990.

== Release ==
Vasthuhara was released on 3 June 1991 to widespread critical acclaim. Despite being an art film, Vasthuhara was a commercial success at the box office. The film is regarded as a classic in Malayalam cinema. Khalid Mohamed wrote in The Times of India, "Vasthuhara (The Dispossessed) is a moving, thought-out masterwork, clear and crystalline." Film critic Kozhikodan included the film on his list of the 10 best Malayalam movies of all time.

== Major awards ==
National Film Awards

- Best Feature Film in Malayalam – G. Aravindan, T. Ravindranath

Kerala State Film Awards

- Best Film – G. Aravindan, T. Ravindranath
- Best Director – G. Aravindan
- Best Story – C. V. Sreeraman
