= Unni (1989 film) =

- Directed by: G. Aravindan
- Written by: Bill Rothman; Kitty Morgan
- Produced by: Bill Rothman; Kitty Morgan; National Film Development Corporation of India
- Starring: Tara Johannessen; Gijie Abraham
- Cinematography: Sunny Joseph; Shaji N. Karun; Ajayakumar
- Edited by: Beena Venugopal; K. R. Bose
- Production company: Malabar Productions
- Release date: 1989
- Running time: 86 minutes
- Countries: India; United States
- Languages: English; Malayalam

Unni is a 1989 Indian feature film directed by G. Aravindan. William Rothman (Bill Rothman) and his wife, Kitty Morgan, wrote and co-produced (with the National Film Development Corporation of India) the film. The film was inspired by the experiences of students in the International Honours Programme on Film, Television and Social Change.

== Plot summary ==
The film is about a few American students studying in Kerala. Narrated by one of the students named Tara, the plot follows her relationship with a local boy named Unni.

== Cast ==
- Tara Johannessen as Tara
- Gijie Abraham as Unni
- Sethu as Sethu
- Chris Bonnell as Carol
- Vivian Colodro as Maggie
- Jordan Freid as Jorden
- Harold Linde as Hal
- Lori Wirth
