= Shaji N. Karun =

Indian film director and cinematographer (1952–2025)

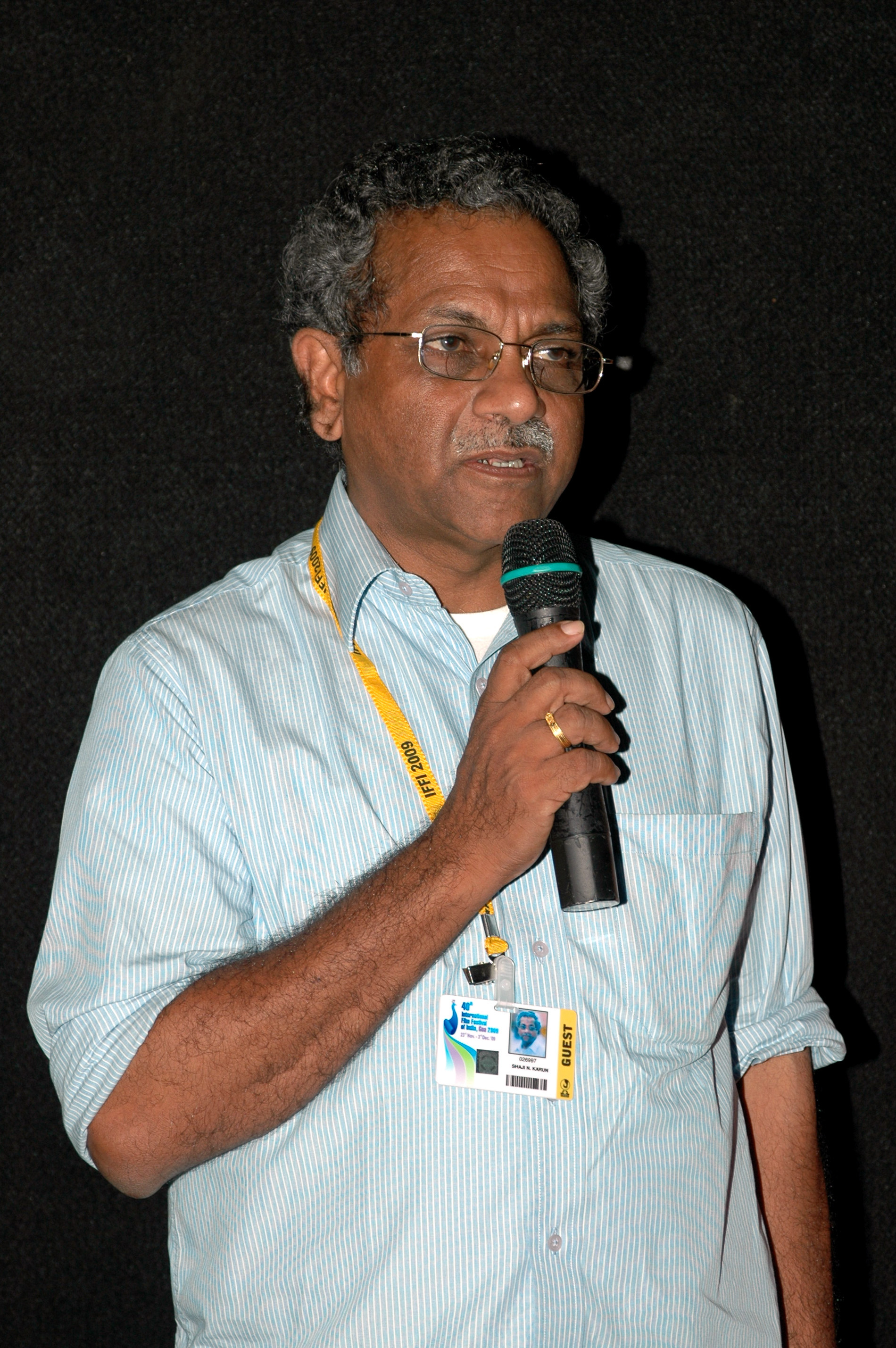
- Born: Shaji Neelakantan Karunakaran; 1 January 1952; Kollam, Travancore–Cochin, India
- Died: 28 April 2025 (aged 73); Thiruvananthapuram, Kerala, India
- Occupations: Film director, cinematographer
- Years active: 1974–2025
- Spouse: Anasuya Devaki Warrier
- Children: Anil Shaji; Appu Shaji
- Parents: N. Karunakaran (father); Chandramati (mother)
- Awards: 1989, Special Mention, Caméra d'Or, Cannes Film Festival (Piravi), FIRST Charlie Chaplin Award 1989 (Piravi) on Sir Chaplin's 100th birth day, Eastman Kodak Award for Excellence (Cinematography), Chevalier of the Ordre des Arts et Lettres from Govt of FRANCE, Padmashree by Govt of India 2011
- Website: www.shajinkarun.com

Shaji Neelakantan Karunakaran ISC (1 January 1952 – 28 April 2025), better known by his stage name Shaji N. Karun, was an Indian film director and cinematographer. His debut film Piravi (1988) won the Caméra d'Or – Mention d'honneur at the 1989 Cannes Film Festival. He was the inaugural chairman of the Kerala State Chalachitra Academy, the first academy for film and TV in India, and the executive chairman of the International Film Festival of Kerala (IFFK) from 1998 to 2001. He is best known for his award-winning films Piravi (1988), Swaham (1994), Vanaprastham (1999) and Kutty Srank (2009). He won the National Award for Best Director for Piravi and two Kerala State Film Awards for Best Director for Swaham and Vanaprastham. He was the Chairman of Kerala State Film Development Corporation from 2019 until his death in 2025.

== Early life and career ==
Shaji N. Karun was born on New Year's Day, 1952, as the eldest son of N. Karunakaran and Chandramati in present-day Kollam district in the former state of Travancore state (now Kerala), India. The family moved to Thiruvananthapuram, the capital of the state, in 1963. He did his schooling in Palkulangara High School and took a bachelor's degree from University College, Thiruvananthapuram. In 1971 he entered the Film and Television Institute of India, where he took his diploma in cinematography. His diploma film Genesis (1974), directed by Rahul Dasgupta, got many awards and started his career. He won the gold medal on graduation in 1974. After graduation, he worked in ISRO Ahmedabad, Mumbai TV, Madras Film Industry on contract basis until 1975 when Kerala State Film Development Corporation (KSFDC) was about to emerge. He became responsible with founder Chairman P R S Pillai, and its then Managing Director G.Vivekanandan for the planning, designing future visions of KSFDC to bring back the Film Industry that was until then rooted in Madras. His role with the participation in meaningful cinema activities through the contribution of KSFDC and well-known giants in Malayalam filmmakers resulted in many landmark achievements to the Malayalam Cinema nationally and internationally.

In 1998, he started and presided over the first film academy in India as Kerala State Chalachitra Academy. It was in the same year he started the International Film Festival (IFFK) as competitive that further FIAPF recognized the festival as internationally competitive under his tenure. He has presented three films: Piravi, Swaham, Vanaprastham consecutively to Cannes official sections, a rare achievement for any filmmakers worldwide, where the film Swaham was in the competition of Cannes in 1994. In August 2018, Karun was elected president of the Purogamana Kalasahitya Sangham (PUKASA), a progressive cultural organisation in Kerala. In 2023, he received the J. C. Daniel Award, the Government of Kerala's highest honour for lifetime achievement in Malayalam cinema. In 2024, Payal Kapadia's All We Imagine as Light became the first Indian film in 30 years to compete for the Palme d'Or at the Cannes Film Festival, following Karun's Swaham, which had competed in 1994. Karun's films Piravi, Vanaprastham, and Kutty Srank won the National Film Award for Best Feature Film, making him the only Malayalam filmmaker to have directed three winners of the award.

== Film direction ==
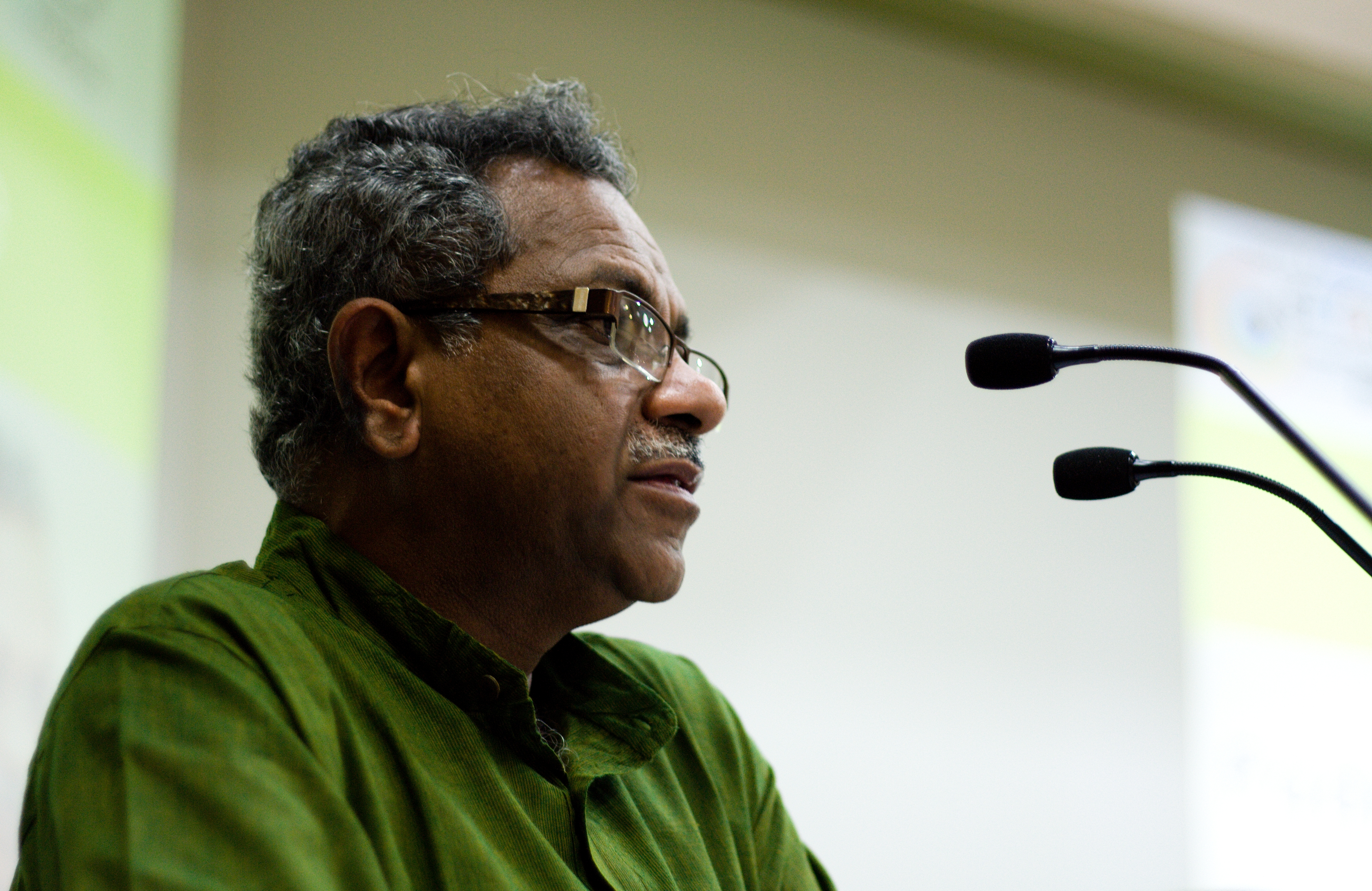
Shaji N. Karun giving a lecture at Saarang 2011, IIT Madras

Shaji made his directorial debut with the Malayalam film Piravi ("The Birth", 1988), which won him the prestigious Caméra d'Or – Mention d'honneur at the 1989 Cannes Film Festival. While Piravi was about the grief of a father who loses his son, Shaji's second film, Swaham (1994) continued with the theme of grief. Swaham was selected to compete at the 1994 Cannes Film Festival. Vanaprastham ("The Final Dance", 1999) dealt with the identity crisis faced by an actor. Mohanlal played the lead role in this film. He directed the film Nishad, made in Hindi, which was completed in May 2002, and premiered in the Fukuoka International Film Festival held in September 2002 in Japan. His latest film is titled Kutty Srank with Mammootty playing the lead role. The film was released theatrically in Kerala in July 2010. Swapaanam with Jayaram and Kadambari has premiered at Dubai International Film Festival on 8 December 2013, a rare recognition for Malayalam Cinema as the World premiere screening outside India. Olu, his latest film, under 'fantasy perception' and narrative, had chosen the inaugural film of Indian Panorama film selections presented in International Film Festival of India Goa-2018. OLU has also been chosen as the "OPENING FILMS" of TWO major International film festivals- International film festival of INNSBRUCK 2019, AUSTRIA, ISOLA Cinema International film festival 2019, SLOVENIA. Olu also won the National Film Award for Best Cinematography (2018) award in the 66th National Film Awards.

He also made around a dozen short films and documentaries. Besides making films, Shaji Karun has been active as a juror at many international film festivals and an active participant in governmental and academic arenas. He was the inaugural Chairman of the Kerala State Chalachitra Academy, the first academy for film and TV in India and was also the Executive Chairman of International Film Festival of Kerala from 1998 to 2001.

== Controversies ==
In 2022, several women filmmakers accused Shaji of workplace harassment. The allegations were made during wider discussions about workplace conduct in the Malayalam film industry.

== Further projects ==
As of January 2018, Shaji was completing the post-production of a new movie titled Olu with Shane Nigam and Esther Anil playing the lead roles. In an interview not long before his death, Shaji revealed that Olu is the tale of a girl who gets gang-raped and sank to the bottom of the backwaters where she can mysteriously survive and live for the next nine months – until she delivers her 'baby from rape'. The film attempts to convey her perception of innocent feminine desires – spiritual and transcendental feelings."

His project Gaadha was announced in September 2012, though was expected to commence shooting by November 2014, it has been postponed until further notice. Music was to be composed by the Polish composer Zbigniew Preisner.

In May 2022 Shaji N. Karun announced his next project based on the life of Amrita Sher-Gil, pioneer of Indian modern art. In an interview with Jisha Surya of News9Live the cinematographer-director said that the multilingual movie would be based on the biographical writings of Sher-Gil. Conceived as an Indo-French-US collaborative project, the movie would have international actors and technicians. Karun approached a Mexican actor to play the lead role of the Hungarian-Indian painter.

== Personal life and death ==
Shaji married Anasuya Warrier, daughter of P. K. R. Warrier, who was his neighbor in Trivandrum for quite some time, on 1 January 1975. After a brief stint in the south Indian city of Madras, he returned to Thiruvananthapuram in 1976 where he got an appointment as film officer in the newly formed state Film Development Corporation. They have 2 sons, Anil and Appu. His association with the legendary Malayalam filmmaker G. Aravindan began at this time. Then he continued working with notable directors like G. Aravindan, K. G. George and M. T. Vasudevan Nair as a cinematographer. His career also spread to many activities by the Government of India and Kerala where he served in the capacities of advisory status on policy decisions. The 20th International film festival of Kerala conducted by the government of Kerala, on 4–11 December 2015 under his advisory capacity was marked by the Press and film lovers as the best of the festivals held so far. In August 2018, he was selected for the position of 8th President of Purogamana Kala Sahitya Sangham (Progressive Arts & Literary Organization) an Association for Art and Letters. On 31 May 2019, the government of Kerala appointed him as the Chairman of Kerala State Film Development Corporation. He assumed the position on 17 June 2019 and held it until his death in April 2025.

Karun died at his home in Thiruvananthapuram on 28 April 2025, at the age of 73.

== Awards and milestones ==
=== National and international honours ===
- J. C. Daniel Award for Lifetime Achievement from the Government of Kerala 2024
- Life Time Achievement Aawrd- 10th International Youth Film Festival Colombo by Government of Sri Lanka-2024
- Life Time Achievement Award- 12th Jaipur International Film Festival INDIA-2020
- Life Time Achievement- Tyrol : IFFI Prize (2014) Innsbruck Film Festival, AUSTRIA
- Padma Shri in 2011 INDIA
- Ordre des Arts et des Lettres (1999) FRANCE
- The first Sir Charles Chaplin Award to commemorate the centenary of Chaplin's birth (1989) Edinburgh International Film Festival, UK

=== As a cinematographer ===
- Eastman Kodak Award for Excellence, Hawaii International Film Festival (1989)
- National Film Award: Thampu (Circus Tent) (1979)
- Awards from the Government of Kerala: Kanchana Sita (1977), Esthappan (1981), Onnu Muthal Poojyam Vare (1986)

=== As a director ===
- Cannes Film Festival, nominated for Palme d'Or (Best Film): Swaham (1994)
- Cannes Film Festival, Caméra d'Or (Special Mention): Piravi (1989)
- London Film Festival, Outstanding Film: Piravi (1989)
- Locarno International Film Festival, Grand Jury Prize (Silver Leopard): Piravi (1989)
- Hawaii International Film Festival , Best film Piravi (1989)
- Chicago International Film Festival , USA, Silver Hugo
- Fajr Film Festival. Iran Crystal Simorgh
- Bergamo Film Meeting , Italy Rosa Camuna 1990
- International Film Festival Innsbruck iffi.at, Austria Best Film 1995
- Bergamo Film Meeting , Italy Bronze Rosa Camuna 1995
- 1999 Cannes Film Festival: Vanaprastham was screened in the Un Certain Regard section of the festival (1999)
- Mumbai International Film Festival , FEPRISCI Prize, 1999
- International Istanbul Film Festival, Grand Jury Prize: Vanaprastham (2000)

National Film Awards:

- 2009 – Best Film – Kutty Srank
- 1999 – Best Film – Vanaprastham
- 1997 – Best Non-Feature Film – Sham's Vision (English)
- 1994 – Special Jury Award – Swaham
- 1988 – Best Film – (Producer) Piravi
- 1988 – Best Director – Piravi
- 1979 – Best Cinematographer (Black & White) – Thampu

Kerala State Film Awards:

- 1999 – Best Director – Vanaprastham
- 1994 – Second Best Film – Swaham
- 1994 – Best Director – Swaham
- 1988 – Second Best Film – Piravi
- 1986 – Best Cinematographer – Onnu Muthal Poojyam Vare
- 1979 – Best Cinematographer – Esthappan
- 1977 – Best Cinematographer – Kanchana Sita

Filmfare Awards Souths:

- 1989: Filmfare Award for Best Director – Malayalam – Piravi

== Filmography as director ==
=== Feature films ===
| Year | Title |
|---|---|
| 1988 | Piravi |
| 1994 | Swaham |
| 1999 | Vanaprastham' |
| 2002 | Nishad |
| 2007 | A.K.G |
| 2010 | Kutty Shranku' |
| 2014 | Swapaanam |
| 2018 | Oolu |

=== Documentaries ===
| Year | Title | Notes |
|---|---|---|
| 2025 | Pranan | World premiere at IDSFFK 2025 |

=== Short films ===
| Year | Title |
|---|---|
| 1979 | Wild Life of Kerala |
| 1980 | Kerala Carnival |
| 1986 | Kannikal |
| 1996 | Sham's Vision |
| 1998 | Bhavam |
| 2000 | G. Aravindan |
| 2002 | Big Man & Small World |
| 2004 | Yathrakkidayil |
| 2006 | Moving Focus – A Voyage with K. G. Subramanyan |
| 2007 | AKG |
| 2010 | Fine Balance |
| 2011 | Waiting |
| 2012 | Signature film for the International Film Festival of India |
| 2015 | Artist Namboodiri – Neruvara (True Line) |

== As a cinematographer ==
| Year | Film |
|---|---|
| 1974 | Genesis |
| 1976 | Lakshmi Vijayam |
| 1976 | Njavalppazhangal |
| 1977 | Muhoorthangal |
| 1978 | Thampu |
| 1978 | Kanchana Sita |
| 1979 | Kummatty |
| 1979 | Esthappan |
| 1981 | Pokkuveyil |
| 1982 | Enikku Vishakunnu |
| 1983 | Koodevide |
| 1983 | Manju |
| 1983 | Lekhayude Maranam Oru Flashback |
| 1984 | Mangalam Nerunnu |
| 1984 | Panchavadi Palam |
| 1985 | Chidambaram |
| 1985 | Meenamasathile Sooryan |
| 1985 | Principal Olivil |
| 1986 | Nakhakshathangal |
| 1986 | Arappatta Kettiya Gramathil |
| 1986 | Ek Chadar Maili Si |
| 1986 | Neram Pularumbol |
| 1986 | Meenamasathile Sooryan |
| 1986 | Onnu Muthal Poojyam Vare |
| 1986 | Panchagni |
| 1987 | Oridathu |
| 1988 | Marattam |
| 1989 | Unni |
| 1992 | Sargam |
| 1993 | Antim Nyay |
