= Vidheyan =

- Directed by: Adoor Gopalakrishnan
- Screenplay by: Adoor Gopalakrishnan
- Based on: Bhaskara Pattelarum Ente Jeevithavum by Paul Zacharia
- Produced by: K. Ravindran Nair
- Starring: Mammootty; M. R. Gopakumar; Tanvi Azmi; Sabitha Anand; Aliyar; K. P. A. C. Azeez
- Cinematography: Mankada Ravi Varma
- Edited by: M. Mani
- Music by: Vijaya Bhaskar
- Release date: January 27, 1994
- Running time: 112 minutes
- Country: India
- Language: Malayalam

Vidheyan (transl. The Servile) is a 1994 Indian Malayalam-language drama film directed and written by Adoor Gopalakrishnan. It is based on the novella Bhaskara Pattelarum Ente Jeevithavum by Paul Zacharia. The film, starring Mammootty and M. R. Gopakumar, explores the master-slave relationship in a South Karnataka setting.

Vidheyan won the National Film Award for Best Feature Film in Malayalam and Best Actor Award for Mammootty. It also won numerous awards at the Kerala State Film Awards, including the Best Film.

== Plot ==
Thommy, a migrant labourer from Wayanad, Kerala, comes to Patellar's town in South Karnataka for survival. Pattellar, the landlord of the town, abuses him. He is a psychopath who loves to rape beautiful women. After learning from Thommy about his wife Omana, Pattellar rapes her that night. He then offers Thommy a job and gifts him things. He becomes an obedient servant of Pattellar, who continues to have sex with Omana every night. On seeing Kuttaparai's newly wedded beautiful daughter, Pattellar, without regard to consequences, kidnaps & rapes her also.

On one occasion, Pattellar senselessly beats a wealthy man, Yusuf. Pattellar's wife advises him to change his ways and be a good man. She is a kind woman and treats Thommy with love and affection. Fed up with her advice, Pattellar decides to kill his wife and asks for Thommy's help to make it look like an accident. During the attempt, Thommy is injured by a gunshot, instead of Pattellar's wife. He considers killing Thommy, but his wife makes arrangements to take Thommy to the hospital. Once recovered, one night Pattellar again goes to Thommy's house, not to have sex with Omana again but to take Thommy fishing in the temple pond, which is forbidden. They return unsuccessful. Yusuf, Kuttaparai, and several prominent members of the town decide to kill Pattellar and ask for Thommy's help. Thommy brings Pattellar to his house as per plan, but he escapes. He murders his wife and takes Thommy's help to stage it as suicide. Thommy weeps at Pattellar's wife's death. But soon her brothers discover the truth of the death of their sister and retaliate. Bruised and battered, Pattellar takes Thommy with him in search of a safe haven. Fleeing through the jungle, Pattellar is killed by his brothers-in-law. At first, Thommy weeps for his master, Pattellar. He eventually exults in freedom.

== Cast ==
- Mammootty as Bhaskara Pattelar
- M. R. Gopakumar as Thommy
- Tanvi Azmi as Saroja, Bhaskara Patelar's Wife
- Sabitha Anand as Omana
- Aliyar
- Babu Namboothiri
- K. P. A. C. Azeez
- Prof. K. V. Thampi
- Krishnan Kutty Nair
- Naveen D. Padil
- Rohidas Kadri

== Production ==
The film is a cinematic adaptation of the novel Bhaskara Pattelarum Ente Jeevithavum by Malayalam writer Paul Zacharia. Zacharia's novella was inspired by a real-life character named Patela Shekhara Gowda alias Shiradi Shekhara. Zacharia happened to hear the stories of Patelar when he was residing near Shiradi village Mangalore in Karnataka. After the release of the film, Adoor had a tiff with Zacharia over the film. Zachariah said Adoor tainted his story with Hindutva.

== Accolades ==
- 1993 National Film Awards

| Category | Winner | Citation |
|---|---|---|
| Best Actor | Mammootty (also for Ponthan Mada) | Depiction of the relationship of power and terror at an existential level. |
| National Film Award for Best Feature Film in Malayalam | Director – Adoor Gopalakrishnan Producer: - K. Ravindranathan Nair | For its in-depth handling and complex delineation of the psychological evolution of two characters, representative of the transformation of terror into power and its hold over the life of the existentialist outsider. |

- Kerala State Film Awards

| Category | Winner |
|---|---|
| Best Film | Director – Adoor Gopalakrishnan Producer – K. Ravindran Nair (General Pictures) |
| Best Director | Adoor Gopalakrishnan |
| Best Actor | Mammootty |
| Best Screenplay | Adoor Gopalakrishnan |
| Best Story | Paul Zacharia |
| Special Jury Award | M. R. Gopakumar |

Other awards

Award
NETPAC Award at Rotterdam International Film Festival
INTER FILM Prize – Honourable Mention at the Mannheim-Heidelberg International Film Festival
Special Jury Mention, Singapore International Film Festival
NETPAC-FIPRESCI Award, Singapore International Film Festival
