= Kerala State Film Award for Best Documentary =

Annual Indian film award

The Kerala State Film Award for Best Documentary is presented annually at the Kerala State Film Awards of India.

== Winners ==
Year	Documentary	Director	Producer
1978	Vallathol	P. Bhaskaran	
1979	Koodiyattam	P. M. Aziss	
1980	Visala Cochi	VR GOPINATH	
1981	Homage to Trees	P. A. Iqball	
1982	Krishnanattam. Story of A Revolution	Adoor Gopalakrishnan VR GOPINATH	
1983	Rivers of Kerala	Mathew Paul	James Paul
1984	Kalamandalam Krishnan Nair. Manninte Makkal_	Mathew Paul. _VR GOPINATH	James Paul
1985	Brown Landscape	Aravindan	N. Madhavan Pillai
1986	The Catch	Aravindan	
1987	Basheer the Man	M. A. Rahman	Kannam Kulam Abdulla
1988	Panchavathyam	Mathew Paul	Doordharshan, Thiruvananthapuram
1989	Kala Mandalam Krishnan Kutty Pothuval	K. R. Mohan	
1990	Mohiniyattam	Sivan	
1991	Mulberriyum Pattunoolum	P. P. Govindan	K S F D C
1992	Noottandinte Sakshi	Salam Karasseri	Sasibooshan
1993	Thekku (Teak)	Majid Gulisthan	K S F D C
1994	Visudhavanangal	K. R. Mohanan	K S F D C
1995	Pakarnnattam	M. R. Rajan, C. S. Venkiteswaran	P. G. Mohanan
1996	Silent Screams (A Village Chronicle)	O. K. Johny	Jose Sebastian
1997	Ayyankali - Mizhavu	R. S. Madhu - K. R. Subhash	P. Sasidharan - P. D. Raphel
1998	Premji-Ithihasathinte Sparsam	M. R. Rajan	P. Appukkuttan, Secretary, Kerala Sangeetha Nataka Academy, Thrissur
1999	Kalamandalam Gopi	Adoor Gopalakrishnan	Films Division
2000	Palathulliperuvallom	K. Mohankumar	K. Sivaprasad
2001	Kanavumalayilekku	M. G. Sasi	Tomy Mathew
2002	Jeevanakalayude Pulluvageetham	M. Venukumar	L. Sivanandan
2003	Nishadam	Madhu Eravankara	Magic Lantern
2004	Kovilan Ente Achachan	M. A. Rahman	
2005			
2006	Minukku	M.R.Rajan	Devadasan Kizhapat
2007	Before the Brush Dropped	Vinod Mankara	
2008	No award		
2009	Ezhuthatha Kathukal	Vinod Mankara	
2010	Making of a Maestro - A documentary on Kalamandalam Gopi	Meena Das Narayan	K Narayan Nedungadi
