= William Rothman =

American film theorist and critic (born 1944)

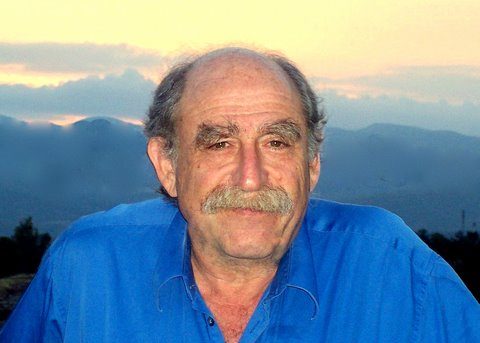
William Rothman (photo by Kitty Morgan)

William Rothman (born June 25, 1944) is an American film theorist and critic. Since receiving his Ph.D. in philosophy from Harvard University in 1974, he has authored numerous books, including Hitchcock: The Murderous Gaze (1982), The "I" of the Camera: Essays in Film Criticism, History and Aesthetic (1988), and Tuitions and Intuitions: Essays at the Intersection of Film Criticism and Philosophy (2019). He was "part of a modern wave of thinkers to apply questions of philosophy to the medium of movies" during the 1980s, and his work contributed to the emergence of the sub-discipline that has come to be known as "film-philosophy." Rothman has also written on aspects of film theory and on the writings of Stanley Cavell, an American philosopher who made film a major focus of his work. He is currently Professor of Cinematic Arts in the School of Communication at the University of Miami.

== Life ==
William Rothman received his Ph.D. from Harvard's Philosophy Department, where Stanley Cavell was his dissertation advisor. After submitting his dissertation in 1973, he accepted a position as assistant professor in Cinema Studies at New York University. In 1976, a National Endowment for the Humanities grant brought him back to Harvard, "to develop a set of eight courses to the present curriculum in film and to develop new teaching and research tools...to help secure the humanistic incorporation of film into universities."

In 1986, Rothman became Director of the International Honors Program on Film, Television and Social Change in Europe and Asia. In 1989, he and his wife, filmmaker Kitty Morgan, wrote and co-produced (with the National Film Development Corporation of India) Unni, a 35mm feature film shot in South India and directed by the Indian filmmaker G. Aravindan. In 1990, Rothman relocated to Florida to be a professor in the Motion Picture Program (now the Department of Cinematic Arts) at the University of Miami, where he served as Director of the Graduate Program in Film Studies for several years. He was the founding editor of the "Harvard Film Studies" series at Harvard University Press, and also served as series editor for the "Cambridge Studies in Film" series at Cambridge University Press.

== Writings ==
Rothman has published critical essays on films ranging from the works of Alfred Hitchcock and other "classical" directors (e.g., George Cukor, John Ford, Howard Hawks, Yasujiro Ozu, Jean Renoir, Billy Wilder) to more contemporary filmmakers (e.g., Chantal Akerman, the Dardenne brothers, Abbas Kiarostami, Terrence Malick).

In Rothman's first book, Hitchcock: The Murderous Gaze (1982), his stated goals were to achieve a philosophical perspective on Hitchcock's authorship and to investigate, philosophically, the conditions of authorship in film. In pursuit of these goals, he performed extended readings, incorporating over 600 frame enlargements of five Hitchcock films.

His 1997 book Documentary Film Classics was part of a revival of scholarly interest in the subject, focusing on historically significant documentaries (from Nanook of the North and Land without Bread to Night and Fog, "direct cinema" films of Richard Leacock and D. A. Pennebaker, ethnographic films of Jean Rouch and Robert Gardner, and personal documentaries by Alfred Guzzetti, Ross McElwee and Edward Pincus).

Rothman has also written on and edited collections of the writings of Cavell, which, according to scholar David LaRocca, have "helped the inheritance of Cavell's relationship to film and thinking about film." Rothman's later work focused on the implications of the affinities between Cavell's way of thinking and that of Ralph Waldo Emerson, a moral and philosophical outlook Cavell named "Emersonian perfectionism."

== Books ==
- Hitchcock—The Murderous Gaze, Harvard University Press, 1982
- The "I" of the Camera: Essays in Film History, Criticism and Aesthetics, Cambridge University Press, 1988; Expanded edition, 2004
- Documentary Film Classics, Cambridge University Press, 1997
- Reading Cavell's "The World Viewed": A Philosophical Perspective on Film (with Marian Keane), Wayne State University Press, 2000
- Cavell on Film (editor), State University of New York Press, 2005
- Jean Rouch: A Celebration of Life and Film, Schena Editore and Presses de l'Université de Paris-Sorbonne (editor), 2007
- Three Documentary Filmmakers: Errol Morris, Ross McElwee, Jean Rouch (editor), State University of New York Press, 2009
- Hitchcock—The Murderous Gaze (expanded edition), State University of New York Press, 2012
- Must We Kill the Thing We Love? Emersonian Perfectionism and the Films of Alfred Hitchcock, Columbia University Press, 2014
- Looking with Robert Gardner, State University of New York Press (co-editor), 2016
- Tuitions and Intuitions: Essays at the Intersection of Film Criticism and Philosophy, State University of New York Press, 2019
- The Holiday in His Eye: Stanley Cavell's Vision of Film and Philosophy, State University of New York Press (scheduled publication, November 2021)

== Selected Keynote Addresses, Special Lectures, and Other Professional Activities ==
- "Cavell's Two Takes on The Philadelphia Story," La pensée du cinema: International Conference in Honor of Stanley Cavell, Université Paris 1 Panthéon-Sorbonne, Paris, 2019
- "Pursuits of Happiness: Cavell in Transition," "The Thought of Movies" Conference, University of California at Santa Barbara, 2019
- "Cavell Reading Cavell," "The Thought of Movies" Conference, Boston University, 2019
- "Alfred Hitchcock's Signature Motifs," video essay for Criterion Collection DVD of Hitchcock's The Lodger, 2017
- "Silent Cinema in China," Columbia Global Center, Paris, 2017
- "Pursuing Pursuits of Happiness," Colloquium "À la recherche du bonheur. Stanley Cavell, le cinéma et la vie ordinaire," Université Paris 1 Panthéon-Sorbonne, Paris, 2017
- "Film, Philosophy, Education," the Gregynog Conference on the Philosophy of Education, Wales, 2016
- "Dardenne, Levinas, Cavell," Film-Philosophy conference, Edinburgh, 2016
- "Levinas and Cavell," the annual Wittgenstein Lecture, Centre de philosophie contemporaine de la Sorbonne, Université Paris 1 Panthéon-Sorbonne, 2016
- "Emerson, Film, Hitchcock," Colloquium on Philosophy and Film, Åbo Akademi University, Finland, 2015
- "Seeing the Light in The Tree of Life," International Colloquium on Film and Philosophy, Lima, Peru, 2014
- "Television Drama Then and Now," the Annual George Brandt Lecture, University of Bristol, UK, 2014
- "Marnie: Hitchcock's Last Masterpiece," closing evening address at the New York International Film Festival, 2012
- "Suspense and Temporality in the Films of Alfred Hitchcock," Conference on Suspenseful Times and the Moving Image, Tel Aviv University, 2010
- "Moral Perfectionism and the Films of Alfred Hitchcock," Conference on Philosophy and Criticism," The University of Sydney, August 2010
- "The Universal Hitchcock," the Annual Daphne Mayo Lecture, University of Queensland Art Museum, Brisbane, Australia, 2010
