= Kummatty =

- കുമ്മാട്ടി (Malayalam)
- Directed by: G. Aravindan
- Written by: G. Aravindan, Kavalam Narayana Panicker
- Produced by: K. Ravindran Nair
- Starring: Ramunni; Master Ashok; Vilasini Reema
- Cinematography: Shaji N. Karun
- Edited by: Ramesan Anand
- Music by: M. G. Radhakrishnan; G. Aravindan
- Production company: General Pictures
- Release date: 12 July 1979
- Running time: 90 minutes
- Country: India
- Language: Malayalam

Kummatty (transl. The Bogeyman) is a 1979 Malayalam fantasy film written and directed by G. Aravindan. Ramunni, Master Ashok and Vilasini Reema were cast in the film.

== Plot ==
The film opens with the rising sun depicting the beauty of a mountainous hamlet's brownish-green landscape and fresh skies as a man sings in the background. A young boy, Chindan, brushes his teeth, gets ready, and leaves for school as his mother peels vegetables. Chindan walks to a temple with his friend and consumes the offering given by the temple priest. As both the friends walk through the temple, they see an old woman sweeping the temple floor, and Chindan whispers "Kummatty" in her ear to annoy her, before running away.

Soon, a lot of children are seen, holding books at their chest, walking to school through luscious white fields. That day, they are taught about elections and the rules of voting. Chindan comes home and plays with his caged parrot. Then, he runs around freely and sees a black dog, which he thinks about hitting with a stone, but refrains, letting the dog run away.

Chindan gathers his school friends and plays with them around the river. The next day, while returning from school, Chindan and his friend follow three men who are discussing a woman's deteriorating health. They all go to the woman's house where the woman lies sweaty and unconscious, and the doctor starts moving his hand above her, trying to pull negative energy out from her body. Chindan looks at them with intrigue.

In the morning, the old woman from the temple brings a pot of water but the children snatch the pot away from her and run. The old woman curses them saying, "Just see, I'm going to send you to Kummatty." Chindan and his friends sing a song about Kummatty's descent as they prance through the grass, the fields, and around the huge trees.

An early dawn breaks, and a man enters the village with a cloth-sack on his shoulder, and bohemian animal masks hung on a rod under his arms. Chindan and two of his female friends spot the man and follow him as he keeps singing until he reaches the temple and rests under a tree. The old woman, Chindan, the two girls, keep staring at him with curiosity until he scares them away. During the stark night, as children study under oil lamps and candles in their own homes, the man's songs flutter through the air, catching the attention of every child.

In the morning, Chindan and his friends gather by the temple to see the man take a bath in the ancient pool, while the old woman peeks from behind the wall. Later, the man goes to the school and starts singing and flailing his tambourine, making all the children rush to him in amusement.

While returning from school, Chindan sees that the man has left his masks under the tree, and he touches them and inspects them before leaving for the market. As he returns from the market, he encounters the man and becomes scared of him, but the man tells him to walk on. From then on, Chindan and his friends name the man Kummatty (The Bogeyman). Chindan tells his friends about the incident and all of Kummatty's inexplicable abilities. But a couple days later, they secretly watch Kummatty getting his beard shaven by the bushes, and the friends refute Chindan's theory of the man/Kummatty having supernatural powers.

On another day, Chindan encounters Kummatty again. This time, Kummatty asks him to come closer and introduce himself. Then, out of nowhere, he conjures up a fruit and tells Chindan to eat it. This whole ordeal is seen by the old woman. Someplace else, Chindan's friends play hide and seek. He runs to them and spoils their game, and tells everyone about the magic Kummatty performed. He and his friends run through the jungle to Kummatty resting under the tree, who asks the children to sit. He unties a cloth bag revealing biscuits in shape of birds. He gives every child each, as a token of innocent friendship. Then, Kummatty, Chindan, and all of the friends play and sing together.

The next day, Chindan helps the old woman by bringing her a pot of water to the temple. While at recess, Chindan comes to know Kummatty is ill. He runs to the doctor and helps him get better. One of Chindan's friends takes part in a cultural festival where he dresses up as a deity and walks through the village with folks crowding around.

Finally, one day, Kummatty gathers his things, his rod of masks and sets out to another place again, but Chindan and his friends run up to him and hug him, asking him to stay.

As a parting gift before he leaves, Kummatty decides to perform a trick for his dearest children. The children sing and dance with Kummatty with utter joy. He makes them wear the masks and sit on all fours. He makes a fist, closes his eyes, and chants a mantra. Suddenly, all of the children, one by one, turn into animals - a monkey, a donkey, a goat, a cow, an orangutan, an elephant, a peacock, a horse, and Chintan turns into a dog.

As Kummatty rejoices, Chindan, now a dog, is chased by the black dog who he almost hit with a stone before. Chindan the dog runs away, while Kummatty returns children back to their original beings. All the children, except Chindan, have returned to being human. Kummatty forgets about Chindan, and leaves the village.

At night, all the villagers light up their torches and search for Chindan. The next morning, Chindan the dog lands up at a mansion, where a girl keeps a lot of dogs as her pets. The girl looks at him and decides to keep him as a pet. She chains him to a tree in the morning and at night the other dogs bark at him in the common kennel. Some days later, Chindan the dog falls ill. The girl's father brings a doctor who finds nothing wrong, but says the dog can only be healthy in open nature. The girl's father persuades the girl to let Chindan the dog go, in exchange for a Pomeranian.

Chindan the dog returns to his home and his mother realizes that the dog is her son. His mother and father decide to pray every deity and perform every ritual to turn Chindan back to human, but to no avail. Both his parents lose hope as Chindan the dog waits for Kummatty to come back. The old woman at the temple passes away.

One year later, Chindan hears the faint melodies his ears were aching to hear. Chindan the dog runs to the voice and finds Kummatty has returned to the village. Kummatty quickly recognizes that the dog is Chindan and hugs him tightly. With this, Chindan turns back to a human again. All the villagers crowd around both of them as they see the moment of marvel. At the end, Chindan goes home, unlatches the bird cage, and frees his parrot by throwing him up into the Malabar sky. The film ends with a montage of numerous birds flying through the limitless sky - some go west, some go south, some in flock, some independently, but all go with utter, pure freedom.

== Cast ==
- Ambalappuzha Ravunni as Kummatty
- Ashok Unnikrishnan
- Kottara Gopalakrishnan Nair
- Kuttyedathi Vilasini

== Soundtrack ==
The music was composed by M. G. Radhakrishnan and Kavalam Narayana Panicker, the latter also wrote the lyrics.

No.	Song	Singers	Lyrics	Length (m:ss)
1	"Aandiyambalam"	Kavalam Narayana Panicker	Kavalam Narayana Panicker	
2	"Aarambatheerambathu"	Kavalam Narayana Panicker	Kavalam Narayana Panicker	
3	"Aarambhathu"		Kavalam Narayana Panicker	
4	"Karukare Kaarmukil"	Kavalam Narayana Panicker	Kavalam Narayana Panicker	
5	"Karukare Kaarmukil" (Fast)	Chorus	Kavalam Narayana Panicker	
6	"Maanathe Macholam"	Kavalam Narayana Panicker	Kavalam Narayana Panicker	
7	"Maanathe Macholam"	Chorus	Kavalam Narayana Panicker	
8	"Muthassikkadhayile"	K. S. Chithra, Manju, Asha, Usha	Kavalam Narayana Panicker	
9	"Muthassikkadhayile" (Version 1)		Kavalam Narayana Panicker	
10	"Naadan Paattu"		Kavalam Narayana Panicker	
11	"Odiyodikkali"	Kavalam Narayana Panicker, Chorus	Kavalam Narayana Panicker	
12	"Paandeedem"	Kavalam Narayana Panicker	Kavalam Narayana Panicker	

== Awards ==
- Kerala State Film Award for Best Children's Film
- Kerala Film Critics Association Award for Best Children's Film

== 2021 restoration ==
In February 2020, K. Ravindranathan Nair of General Pictures, the movie's producer, agreed to grant authorization for the restoration and allow Film Heritage Foundation access to the prints from the National Film Archive of India (NFAI). The prints at the NFAI were examined and thus discovered to not be in a great condition. Since the prints were the best elements FHF could discover, they were sent to the L'Immagine Ritrovata lab in Bologna. The lack of an original sound negative and the lab's use of the less-than-ideal sound from the print complicated the restoration process.

On 19 July 2021, The Film Foundation's World Cinema Project, a program created by the filmmaker Martin Scorsese, announced that it would restore the film. Shivendra Singh Dungarpur of the Film Heritage Foundation and Italy-based Cineteca di Bologna collaborated to restore the film which had lost its rich color palette over the years. Using prints stored at the National Film Archive of India, and with funding from Olivia Harrison and her Material World Charitable Foundation, the film could finally be restored. Scorsese shared images from the restored film to his Instagram account and said in an interview: "Aravindan was a visionary director and Kummatty is considered among his greatest work. The Film Foundation's World Cinema Project will share this film with the wider audience it deserves, making it a true cinematic discovery." The film was restored at the L’Immagine Ritrovata lab in Bologna, Italy, and had its world restoration premiere at the Il Cinema Ritrovato festival later that month.
