= Nadi (film) =

- Directed by: A. Vincent
- Written by: P. J. Antony; Thoppil Bhasi (dialogues)
- Screenplay by: Thoppil Bhasi
- Produced by: Hari Pothan
- Starring: Prem Nazir; Sharada; Madhu; Kaviyoor Ponnamma
- Cinematography: P. N. Sundaram
- Edited by: G. Venkittaraman
- Music by: G. Devarajan
- Production company: Supriya
- Distributed by: Supriya
- Release date: 24 October 1969
- Country: India
- Language: Malayalam

Nadi (transl. The River) is a 1969 Indian Malayalam-language film, directed by A. Vincent and produced by Hari Pothan. The film stars Prem Nazir, Sharada, Madhu and Kaviyoor Ponnamma. The film has musical score by G. Devarajan. The film is best known for the performance by Prem Nazir.

== Cast ==
- Prem Nazir as Johnny
- Sharada as Stella
- Madhu as Sunny
- Ambika as Leela
- Baby Sumathi as Babymol
- P. J. Antony as Varkey
- T. R. Omana as Mariya
- Thikkurissy Sukumaran Nair as Thomachan
- Kaviyoor Ponnamma as Thresia
- Adoor Bhasi as Lasar
- Alummoodan as Paili
- Sankaradi as Ouseph
- Adoor Bhavani as Kunjeli
- Chachappan as Priest
- Jessy as Rosamma
- Nellikode Bhaskaran as Chacko
- Paravoor Bharathan as Neighbour
- Sankar Menon as Rappel
- T. K. Chellappan as Pareeth
- Kavara Sasankan

== Soundtrack ==
The music was composed by G. Devarajan and the lyrics were written by Vayalar Ramavarma. The songs of the film became chartbusters, and are still popular in Kerala. In a survey conducted in 2006 as a part of the 50th anniversary of the formation of Kerala state in 2006, the song Aayiram Padasarangal Kilungi, sung by K. J. Yesudas was selected as the song heard most of times by Malayalis.

No.	Song	Singers	Lyrics	Length (m:ss)
1	"Aayiram Paadasarangal"	K. J. Yesudas	Vayalar Ramavarma	
2	"Innee Vaasamenikkilla" (Bit)	C. O. Anto	Vayalar Ramavarma	
3	"Kaayaampoo" (Bit)	K. J. Yesudas	Vayalar Ramavarma	
4	"Kaayaampoo Kannil"	K. J. Yesudas	Vayalar Ramavarma	
5	"Nithyavishudhayaam"	K. J. Yesudas, Chorus	Vayalar Ramavarma	
6	"Panchathanthram Kadhayile"	P. Susheela	Vayalar Ramavarma	
7	"Puzhakal Malakal"	K. J. Yesudas	Vayalar Ramavarma	
8	"Thappukottaampuram"	P. Susheela, Chorus	Vayalar Ramavarma	
