= Cheriya Manushyarum Valiya Lokavum =

Cartoon by G. Aravindan

Cheriya Manushyarum Valiya Lokavum (Small Men and the Big World) is a cartoon by the film director G. Aravindan. The serial cartoon was published in the last page of Malayalam weekly, Mathrubhumi from 1961 to 1973.

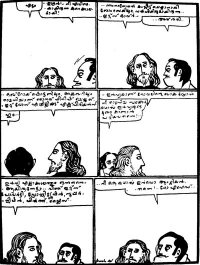

The cartoon dealt with the adventures of the central characters Ramu and Guruji, mingled with political and social satires. Characters in the cartoon literally depicted the socio-political and cultural issues of Kerala with a very special satiric touch. The series was preceded by two more cartoon series namely Ramuvinte Sahasika Yathrakal and Guruji featuring the central characters of Cheriya Manushyarum Valiya Lokavum. The strip split its readers into two equally enthusiastic categories: while many appreciated the strip for its thought-provoking, understated, subtle kind of humour there were as many readers who derided it for not being "funny". The translated version of Walt Disney's cartoon animals was the only other cartoon that this Mathrubhumi carried at that time.

A collected edition of these strips was first published by Bees Books in 1978 and subsequently by DC books in 1996.

Cheriya Manushyarum Valiya Lokavum is regarded by many as India's first graphic novel although the strip does not fall perfectly under the category of graphic novel.
