= Pokkuveyil =

- Poster
- Directed by: G Aravindan
- Written by: Dr. S. P. Ramesh; G. Aravindan
- Screenplay by: Dr. S. P. Ramesh; G Aravindan
- Produced by: K. Ravindran Nair
- Starring: Balachandran Chullikkad; Satish Kumar (currently EVP Asianet); Kalpana; Kalabhavan Ansar; Chavara V. P. Nair
- Cinematography: Shaji N. Karun
- Edited by: A. Ramesan
- Music by: Balachandran Chullikkad
- Production company: General Pictures
- Distributed by: General Pictures
- Release date: 22 January 1982
- Country: India
- Language: Malayalam

Pokkuveyil (transl. Twilight) is a 1982 Indian Malayalam-language film, directed by G. Aravindan and produced by General Pictures' Raveendranathan Nair. The film stars Balachandran Chullikkad, Kalpana, and S. Satish Kumar. Aravindan recorded its audio first as a composition for the flute by Hariprasad Chaurasia and the sarod by Rajeev Taranath. The visuals were 'composed' according to musical notations without any script.

Pokkuveyil won Aravindan the State Film Award for best director.

The film stars Balachandran Chullikad, Kalpana, S. Satish Kumar, Kalabhavan Ansar, and Chavara V. P. Nair. The score was composed by Rajeev Taranath and Hariprasad Chaurasia.

== Plot ==
The movie won the Rajat Kamal for the second-best movie in the country for the year 1982. It was screened at several international film festivals, including Cannes.

Pokkuveyil won Aravindan the State Film Award for best director. The background music was done by Hari Prasad Chaurasia with the flute. Shaji N. Karun's outstanding work behind the camera was one of the main highlights of this movie.

== Cast ==
- Balachandran Chullikkad
- Kalpana
- Kalabhavan Ansar
- Chavara V. P. Nair
- Vijayalakshmi
- Satish Kumar

== Accolades ==
- National Film Award for Second Best Feature Film
- Kerala State Film Award for Best Direction - G. Aravindan
- Kerala State Film Award for Best Sound Recordist - P. Devadas

== Soundtrack ==
The music and lyrics were created by Balachandran Chullikkad.

No.	Song	Singers	Lyrics	Length (m:ss)
1	"Amme Pinvili Vilikkaathe"	Balachandran Chullikkad	Balachandran Chullikkad	
2	"Oru Ormmathan"	Balachandran Chullikkad	Balachandran Chullikkad	
