= National Film Award for Best Direction =

Indian film award

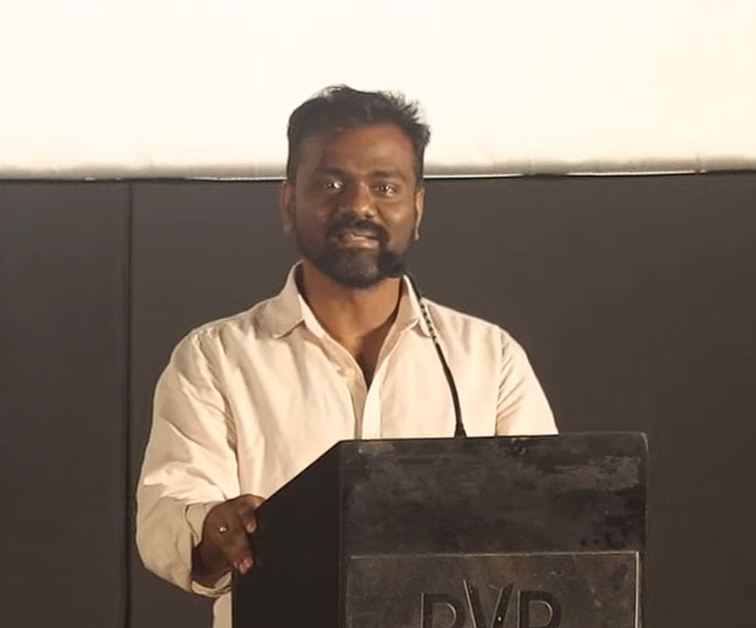
- The 2024 recipient: Rajkumar Periasamy
- Awarded for: Excellence in cinematic direction achievement
- Sponsored by: National Film Development Corporation of India
- Formerly called: Award for excellence in direction (1967–1976)
- Rewards: Swarna Kamal (Golden Lotus); ₹3,00,000
- First award: 1967
- Most recent winner: Rajkumar Periasamy, Amaran (2024)

The National Film Award for Best Direction is an honour presented annually at India's National Film Awards ceremony by the National Film Development Corporation of India (NFDC), an organisation set up by the Indian Ministry of Information and Broadcasting. Since 1967, the award is given by a national panel appointed annually by the NFDC to a director for their work within Indian cinema. It is presented by the president of India at a ceremony held in New Delhi.

The winner is given a "Swarna Kamal" (Golden Lotus) certificate and a cash prize of ₹3,00,000. (Note: The cash prize was ₹2,50,000, from 54th National Film Awards (2006) until 69th National Film Awards (2021). Before the 54th National Film Awards (2006), the cash prize was ₹50,000 (US$530), ₹25,000 (US$270) during the 35th National Film Awards, ₹20,000 (US$210) from 21st National Film Awards until 34th and ₹20,000 (US$210) from 1967 to 1972.) Including ties and repeat winners, the NFDC has presented a total of 57 Best Direction awards to 38 different directors. Although Indian cinema produces films in more than twenty languages, the performances of films that have won awards are of nine languages: Bengali (16 awards), Malayalam (14 awards), Hindi (11 awards), Tamil (5 awards), English, Kannada and Marathi (3 awards each), Assamese and Punjabi (1 award each).

The first recipient was Satyajit Ray, who was honoured at the 15th National Film Awards for directing the Bengali film Chiriyakhana (1967). Ray is also the most frequent recipient, with six wins. Adoor Gopalakrishnan has won 5 awards, which includes his debut Malayalam film Swayamvaram (1972). Mrinal Sen has been awarded four times. He is also the only recipient to win the award for directing films in two different languages: Bengali and Hindi. At the 19th National Film Awards, Girish Karnad and B.V. Karanth shared the award for co-directing the Kannada film Vamsha Vriksha (1972).

== Winners ==
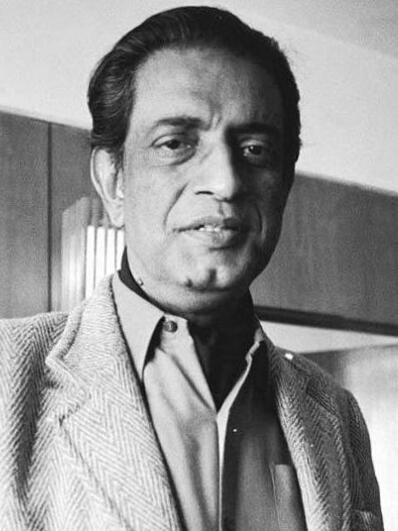
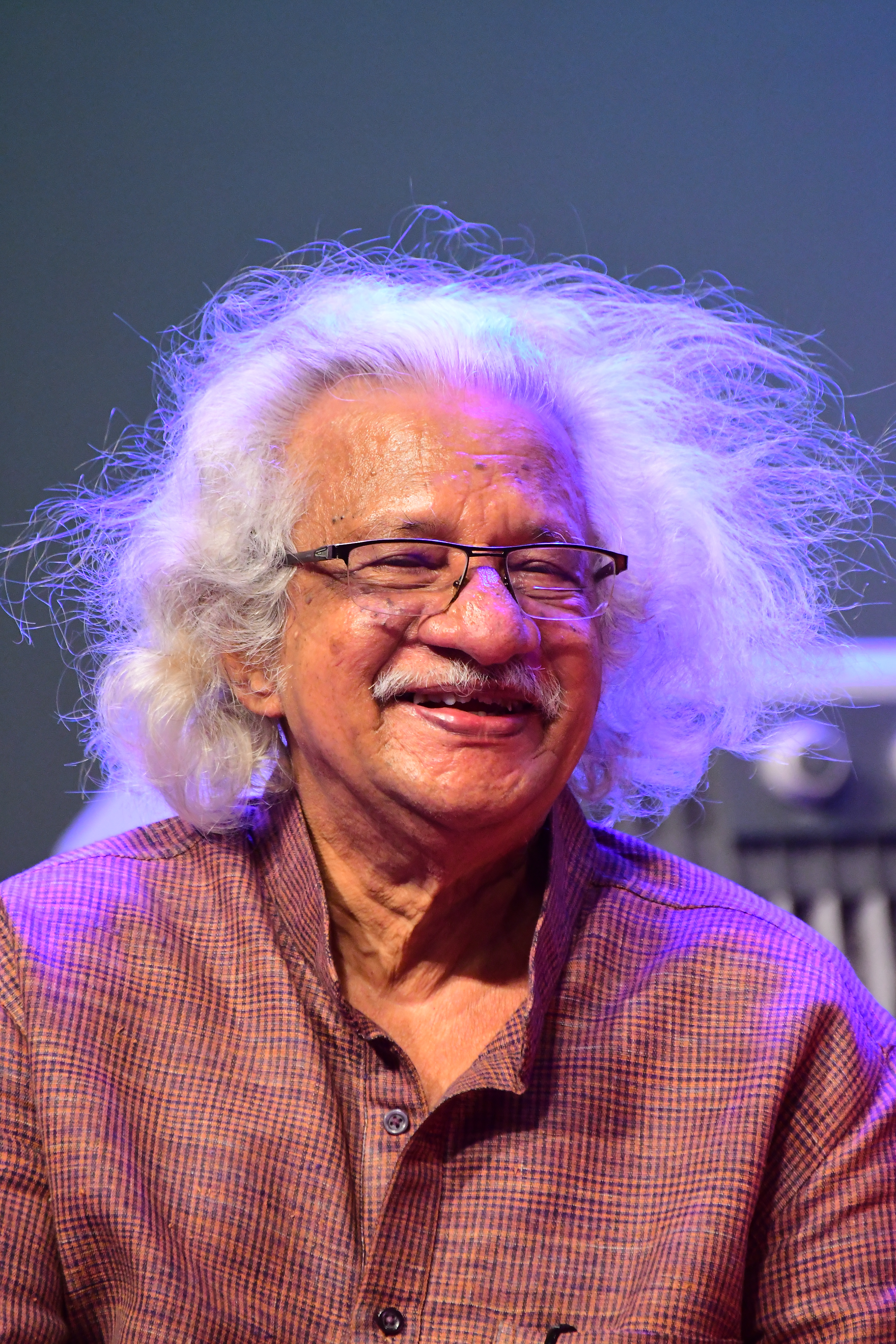
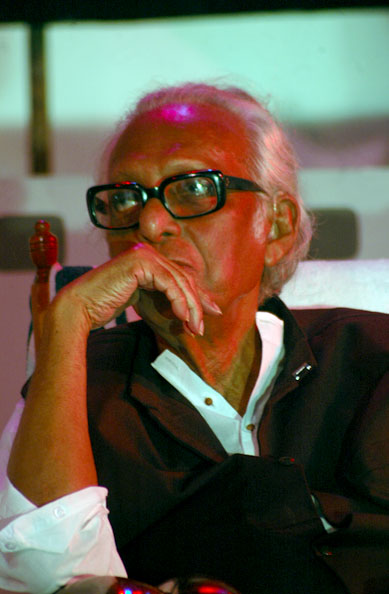
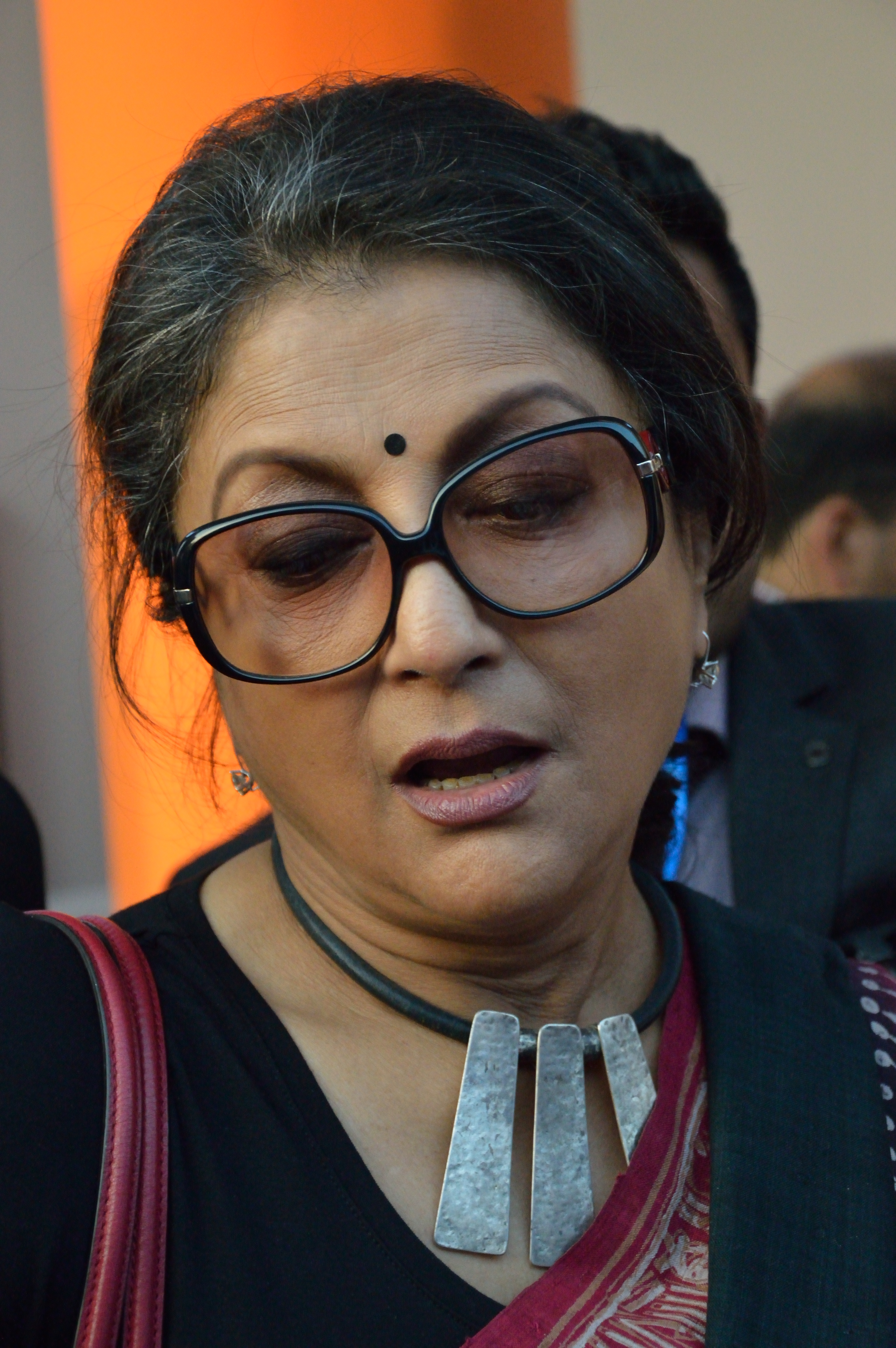
- Top left: Satyajit Ray is the most frequent recipient with six wins.
- Top right: Adoor Gopalakrishnan has received the honour five times.
- Bottom left: Mrinal Sen has been awarded four times.
- Bottom right: Aparna Sen is the only woman director honored by this award..

List of award recipients, showing the year, film and language
Year (Note: Denotes the year in which the film was censored by the Central Board of Film Certification.)	Recipient	Film	Language	Ref
1967 (15th)	Satyajit Ray	Chiriyakhana	Bengali	
1968 (16th)	Satyajit Ray	Goopy Gyne Bagha Byne	Bengali	
1969 (17th)	Mrinal Sen	Bhuvan Shome	Hindi	
1970 (18th)	Satyajit Ray	Pratidwandi	Bengali	
1971 (19th)	B. V. Karanth	Vamsha Vriksha	Kannada	
1971 (19th)	Girish Karnad	Vamsha Vriksha	Kannada	
1972 (20th)	Adoor Gopalakrishnan	Swayamvaram	Malayalam	
1973 (21st)	Mani Kaul	Duvidha	Hindi	
1974 (22nd)	Satyajit Ray	Sonar Kella	Bengali	
1975 (23rd)	Satyajit Ray	Jana Aranya	Bengali	
1976 (24th)	P. Lankesh	Pallavi	Kannada	
1977 (25th)	G. Aravindan	Kanchana Sita	Malayalam	
1978 (26th)	G. Aravindan	Thampu	Malayalam	
1979 (27th)	Mrinal Sen	Ek Din Pratidin	Bengali	
1980 (28th)	Mrinal Sen	Akaler Shandhaney	Bengali	
1981 (29th)	Aparna Sen	36 Chowringhee Lane	English	
1982 (30th)	Utpalendu Chakrabarty	Chokh	Bengali	
1983 (31st)	Mrinal Sen	Khandhar	Hindi	
1984 (32nd)	Adoor Gopalakrishnan	Mukhamukham	Malayalam	
1985 (33rd)	Shyam Benegal	Trikal	Hindi	
1986 (34th)	G. Aravindan	Oridathu	Malayalam	
1987 (35th)	Adoor Gopalakrishnan	Anantaram	Malayalam	
1988 (36th)	Shaji N. Karun	Piravi	Malayalam	
1989 (37th)	Adoor Gopalakrishnan	Mathilukal	Malayalam	
1990 (38th)	Tapan Sinha	Ek Doctor Ki Maut	Hindi	
1991 (39th)	Satyajit Ray	Agantuk	Bengali	
1992 (40th)	Goutom Ghosh	Padma Nadir Majhi	Bengali	
1993 (41st)	T. V. Chandran	Ponthan Mada	Malayalam	
1994 (42nd)	Jahnu Barua	Xagoroloi Bohudoor	Assamese	
1995 (43rd)	Saeed Akhtar Mirza	Naseem	Hindi	
1996 (44th)	Agathiyan	Kadhal Kottai	Tamil	
1997 (45th)	Jayaraj	Kaliyattam	Malayalam	
1998 (46th)	Rajeevnath	Janani	Malayalam	
1999 (47th)	Buddhadeb Dasgupta	Uttara	Bengali	
2000 (48th)	Rituparno Ghosh	Utsab	Bengali	
2001 (49th)	B. Lenin	Ooruku Nooruper	Tamil	
2002 (50th)	Aparna Sen	Mr. and Mrs. Iyer	English	
2003 (51st)	Goutom Ghosh	Abar Aranye	Bengali	
2004 (52nd)	Buddhadeb Dasgupta	Swapner Din	Bengali	
2005 (53rd)	Rahul Dholakia	Parzania	English	
2006 (54th)	Madhur Bhandarkar	Traffic Signal	Hindi	
2007 (55th)	Adoor Gopalakrishnan	Naalu Pennungal	Malayalam	
2008 (56th)	Bala	Naan Kadavul	Tamil	
2009 (57th)	Rituparno Ghosh	Abohomaan	Bengali	
2010 (58th)	Vetrimaaran	Aadukalam	Tamil	
2011 (59th)	Gurvinder Singh	Anhe Ghore Da Daan	Punjabi	
2012 (60th)	Shivaji Lotan Patil	Dhag	Marathi	
2013 (61st)	Hansal Mehta	Shahid	Hindi	
2014 (62nd)	Srijit Mukherji	Chotushkone	Bengali	
2015 (63rd)	Sanjay Leela Bhansali	Bajirao Mastani	Hindi	
2016 (64th)	Rajesh Mapuskar	Ventilator	Marathi	
2017 (65th)	Jayaraj	Bhayanakam	Malayalam	
2018 (66th)	Aditya Dhar	Uri: The Surgical Strike	Hindi	
2019 (67th)	Sanjay Puran Singh Chauhan	Bahattar Hoorain	Hindi	
2020 (68th)	Sachy	Ayyappanum Koshiyum	Malayalam	
2021 (69th)	Nikhil Mahajan	Godavari	Marathi	
2022 (70th)	Sooraj Barjatya	Uunchai	Hindi	
2023 (71st)	Sudipto Sen	The Kerala Story	Hindi	
2024 (72nd)	Rajkumar Periasamy	Amaran	Tamil	
