= Thampu =

- Poster
- Directed by: G. Aravindan
- Written by: G. Aravindan
- Produced by: K. Ravindran Nair
- Starring: Bharath Gopi; Nedumudi Venu; V. K. Sreeraman; Jalaja
- Cinematography: Shaji N. Karun
- Music by: M. G. Radhakrishnan
- Production company: General Pictures
- Release date: 1 September 1978
- Running time: 130 minutes
- Country: India
- Language: Malayalam

Thampu (transl. The Circus Tent) is a 1978 Indian Malayalam-language film written and directed by G. Aravindan. Bharath Gopi, Nedumudi Venu, V. K. Sreeraman, Jalaja and the artistes of the Great Chitra Circus form the cast. The film deals with the roving street circus of Kerala. It is shot in black and white in a direct documentary mode.

In 2021, Film Heritage Foundation decided to do a 4K restoration of the film. The restored film was selected for a world premiere in the Cannes Classic section of the Cannes Film Festival 2022.

== Plot ==
The arrival of a travelling circus troupe causes ripples in the idyllic existence of a village on the banks of a river, which is the setting for Aravindan Govindan's poetic, allegorical film Thamp. Through these ripples, the film explores the transience of human relationships and the rootlessness of the marginalised.

G. Aravindan assembled a group of real circus performers and travelled to the village of Thirunavaya on the banks of the Bharathapuzha river with them in a cinéma-vérité fashion. The circus was set up on the first day, and everyone in the hamlet was invited to see the performance. "We didn't have a script and we shot the incidents as they happened," Aravindan claimed in an interview.

Several attendees had never before attended a circus. When they watched, we recorded their comments. After a brief pause, they forgot about the shooting and the lights and thoroughly immersed themselves in the circus. For three days, the circus is the centre of village life. However, after that, the villagers lose interest and turn their attention to planning a local festival, and the circus group disperses without leaving any traces.

The irony of a young guy from the upper middle class finding himself alone in his own environment after returning from abroad to his hamlet further explores the issue of alienation. He then decides to join the travelling circus troupe in an effort to escape his unhappiness.

The film's beauty lies in its reflective pauses, its keenly perceptive but delicate gaze, and its juxtaposition of the pathos of the circus performers as they go about their daily business and, more starkly, as they speak directly to the camera in impassive close-ups. This black-and-white imagery leaves an impression long after the big tent has closed.

== Cast ==
- Nedumudi Venu
- Jalaja
- V. K. Sreeraman
- Bharath Gopi

== Soundtrack ==
The music was composed by M. G. Radhakrishnan and the lyrics were written by Kavalam Narayana Panicker.

No.	Song	Singers	Lyrics	Length (m:ss)
1	"Kaanakappennu"	Usha Ravi	Kavalam Narayana Panicker	
2	"Kaanakappennu" (No BGM)	Usha Ravi	Kavalam Narayana Panicker	
3	"Oru Yamunaanadi"	Usha Ravi	Kavalam Narayana Panicker	
4	"Sreepaalkkadalil"	M. G. Radhakrishnan, Kavalam Sreekumar	Kavalam Narayana Panicker	

== Major awards ==
- National Film Award for Best Direction – G. Aravindan
- National Film Award for Best Cinematography – Shaji N. Karun
- National Film Award for Best Feature Film in Malayalam
- Kerala State Film Award for Best Direction
- Kerala State Film Award for Second Best Film
- Kerala Film Critics Association Award for Best Film
- Kerala Film Critics Association Award for Best Director – G. Aravindan
- Kerala Film Critics Association Award for Best Cinematographer – Shaji N. Karun
- Kerala Film Critics Association Award for Best Editor – Ramesan

== Restoration of Thampu ==
The restoration of the film was done by Film Heritage Foundation and Davide Pozzi, the director of L’Immagine Ritrovata. While there was no original camera negative, the team found that they could use a dupe negative struck from a 35mm print that was at the NFAI. A second 35 mm print was used for comparison. As per the condition assessment report prepared by the Film Heritage Foundation conservators, there were tears and broken sprockets in the films which were repaired by conservators. The other complication was that as the dupe negative was struck from a print. Saiprasad Akkeneni of the Prasad Corporation Pvt. Ltd. in Chennai, who was partner with the team on the restoration. They scanned both the print and the dupe negative at Prasad Studios in Chennai. The scanning of the picture and sound and the hours of manual work that went into the digital clean-up of the scratches and tears and the image stabilisation was done at Prasad Studios.

Thampu had been shot in black and white by Shaji N. Karun on Indu Stock, an Indian brand of film stock that was manufactured in Ooty. The source material was in poor condition so the scanned film had thick black lines, very grainy images and required image stabilisation. In the print, the blacks were very black and the whites were very white, with no mid-tones and no details of shadows.

Aravindan was always very particular about the sound design in his films and the sound was especially crucial in Thampu as it was shot in a cinema-verité style with a cast primarily of non-actors of the circus troupe where the ambient sound and detailing and layering of small details like the sound of the water, the murmur of voices and the buzz of insects were integral to the artistry of the film. The sound restoration of the film was particularly difficult as there was no original sound negative. The film restoration was selected for a red- carpet world premiere at the Cannes Classic selection.

After restoration the film has shown at the Il Cinema Ritrovato in Bologna, the BFI London Film Festival, the Film Restored Festival in Berlin and the Festival des 3 Continents in Nantes. The film was also screened at the Museum of Modern Art and several universities in USA. In India, the film was screened at the International Film Festival of Kerala. At the Festival des 3 Continents in Nantes, France in 2022 too the film played to full houses.
