= G. Aravindan =

Indian film director

- Born: Govindan Aravindan; 23 January 1935; Kottayam, Kingdom of Travancore (present-day Kerala, India)
- Died: 15 March 1991 (aged 56); Trivandrum, Kerala, India
- Occupations: Director; Screenwriter; Musician; Cartoonist; Painter; Rubber Board officer
- Years active: 1974–1991 (in film)
- Spouse: Kaumudi Aravindan
- Children: Ramu Aravindan
- Parents: M. N. Govindan Nair; P. G. Thankamma

G. Aravindan (Govindan Aravindan in some references, 23 January 1935 – 15 March 1991) was an Indian film director, cartoonist, screenwriter and musician and one of the pioneers of parallel cinema in Malayalam. He was known for his unorthodox way of filmmaking; he changed his cinematic forms consistently, and experimented in storytelling without regular narrative styles.

He studied at the Karapuzha NSS English high school and CMS College in Kottayam and, in 1955, graduated in botany from the University College Trivandrum (University of Travancore at the time). Before venturing into films, he was an established cartoonist. He had also worked in theatre and occasionally directed music for other filmmakers. The Government of India awarded him the fourth highest civilian award of Padma Shri in 1990.

== Biography ==
G. Aravindan was the son of humorist and lawyer M. N. Govindan Nair, who was also one of the founders of the Sahitya Pravarthaka Co-operative Society, a writers co-op established in Kottayam in 1945. Aravindan had early exposure to the art and literary world through writers who visited his parents' home, and the home of writer Karoor Neelakanta Pillai, his neighbour and mother's relative. Aravindan has said in an interview he used to read syndicated comic strips like Blondie, Sad Sack, Donald Duck and Punch magazine his father would bring for him and his siblings. Many of his fellow students at the University college in Trivandrum also later became artists and writers, including painter A. Ramachandran and writers N. Mohanan, Sugathakumari, Thirunalloor Karunakaran, and O. N. V. Kurup. They were also part of his friend circle in their later years.

Aravindan started his professional life in 1956 as an officer at the Rubber Board, a Government of India organisation and was involved in Kerala's film society movement soon after Adoor Gopalakrishnan started his Chitralekha film society. In the late 1950s, he occasionally drew cartoons in periodicals like Kerala Bhushanam, Deshabandhu (both literary magazines published from Kottayam) and Mathrubhumi weekly (published from Kozhikode / Calicut).

In 1960, the then editor of Mathrubhumi weekly, N. V. Krishna Warrier, invited him to publish a cartoon series in the weekly. Subsequently, starting 22 January 1961, Aravindan began his 6-column, single-page, narrative cartoon series Cheriya Manushyarum Valiya Lokavum, (Small People and a Big World) which dealt with the social encounters of its central characters Ramu and Guruji, mingled with political and social satire. Aravindan was not an employee of Mathrubhumi and held a day job as a field officer at the Rubber Board during his cartooning days. When the series started in 1961, he was working at Kothamangalam, and then Kottayam and Trivandrum. He got a transfer to Kozhikode in 1969, during the latter part of the series' creation, and was in Kozhikode from 1969 to 1974. Though many references wrongly suggest the series began when he was working in Calicut. The cartoon series ended on 2 December 1973.

In the coming years, he drew occasional single cartoons for several little magazines and weeklies like Sankramanam, Bodhi, Malayalanadu, Kalakaumudi and on a couple of occasions in the late '80s, Mathrubhumi weekly as well. Aravindan was also active in theatre. He was associated with the theatre club Navarangam in the early '60s with playwright C. N. Sreekantan Nair (who had also started the Kottayam Film Society) and directed the play 'Kali'. In the late 70s and the 80s, he worked with eminent theatre figure Kavalam Narayana Panicker and his theatre group Sopanam and directed Avanavan Kadamba. Aravindan and Kavalam Narayana Panicker had a long and deep association with both of them collaborating often across various projects.

While living in Kozhikode, Aravindan shared a friendship with artist and illustrator Namboothiri, playwright Thikkodiyan, writer Pattathuvila Karunakaran, and several others in Kozhikode's artistic and literary circle, including M. T. Vasudevan Nair. The first film directed by Aravindan, Uttarayanam (1974), came out as a product of this association; the film was produced by Pattathuvila Karunakaran and the story was written by Thikkodiyan. The film, which exposes opportunism and hypocrisy set against the backdrop of the Independence struggle, also had evident influences from Aravindan's cartoon series Cheriya Lokavum Valiya Manushyarum. The film is about Ravi, an unemployed young man, who has to face a series of encounters during his search for a job. Ravi reflects on the past struggles of the anti-British freedom fighters he has learned about from his paralyzed father. He eventually meets Gopalan Muthalaly, a leader of Quit India movement, but now a corrupt contractor. The film garnered wide critical praise and several awards, including five Kerala State Film Awards upon release.

Aravindan's second film Kanchana Sita (1972) was an adaptation of C. N. Sreekantan Nair's play of the same name, which is a reworking of Valmiki's Ramayana. The film is credited with the formation of a new stream called independent filmmaking in Malayalam. It interprets a story from the Uttara Kanda of the epic poem, where Rama sends his wife Sita to the jungle to satisfy his subjects. Aravindan interweaves the Samkhya-Yoga philosophical concepts of Prakriti-Purusha bonds throughout the film. The film, told through a feminist perspective, significantly differs from all other adaptations of Ramayana in the characterisation of the central characters, including Rama and Lakshmana. The characters are humanised, contrary to the way divine characters from Indian mythology are usually depicted in visual media. The film was shot in the interior tribal areas of Andhra Pradesh and the roles of the epic heroes are played by Rama Chenchu tribal people (or Koyas), who claim lineage from the mythical Rama. Upper-class Hindu groups accused Aravindan of blasphemy for casting tribals in the role of Hindu epic heroes. But Aravindan never heeded them, saying the Rama Chenchus have classical features embodying the vitality of Indian sculptural traditions—as opposed to the more popular representations in Raja Ravi Varma's static paintings—and suited the film's theme.

While Kanchana Sita dealt with mythology, Aravindan's next film Thampu (1978) dealt with realism and told the story of suffering in a circus troupe. It was shot in black and white in a direct documentary mode. Aravindan won the award for Best Director at both National Film Awards and Kerala State Film Awards.

His 1979 films Kummatty and Esthappan also ran through different streams. Kummatty is a Pied Piper-like figment of Malabar's folklore about a partly mythic and partly real magician called Kummatty (bogeyman). Esthappan blends together the Biblical story of the deeds of Christ and the way society responded to him, with the life of Esthappan, whose life mystified others. Indefinability of the human mind was the theme of his next film Pokkuveyil (1981). The music for this film was composed by flautist Hariprasad Chaurasia. According to legend is, the visuals of this film were composed according to musical notations, without any script. The protagonist of the film is a young artist who lives with his father, a radical friend, a sportsman and a music-loving young woman. His world collapses when his father dies, the radical friend leaves him, the sportsman friend gets injured in an accident and has to give up sports and her family takes the woman away to another city. The lead role was played by poet Balachandran Chullikkadu.

His next film Chidambaram came after a gap of four years. The 1985 film was an adaptation of a short story by C. V. Sreeraman and was produced by Aravindan under the banner Suryakanthi. The film explores various aspects of relations between men and women through the lives of three people living in a cattle farm in the hilly areas on the border of Kerala and Tamil Nadu. Themes of guilt and redemption are also dealt with. Unlike earlier films directed by Aravindan, Chidambaram featured a cast consisting of many popular actors: Bharath Gopi, Smita Patil, Sreenivasan and Mohandas play the lead roles.

Released in 1986, Oridathu can be seen as a continuation of Aravindan's earlier film Thampu and his cartoon series Cheriya Manushyarum Valiya Lokavum (The Small Man and the Big World). The story is about the problems faced by the people of a hamlet with no electricity when electric supply finally reaches them. The film reaches a conclusion that life is better without electricity. Though the film is discussing a serious issue, the treatment of it is very simplistic. Humour and intensity characterise the film that is set in the mid-fifties. The film is different from many of Aravindan's earlier works as it deals with a broad range of characters and lacks a clear-cut linear story. The theme of Oridathu demanded a caricature treatment so Aravindan made it that way.

When asked about this deviation, Aravindan stated, "There is an element of caricature in all the characters. A little exaggeration and lot of humour was consciously introduced to make effective the last sequence, which is the explosion. In fact the whole film moves towards the climax — the clash on the day of the festival and the breaking out of the fire." The film is complex in that it has many characters and many incidents and therefore does not have a single motif. Hence, Aravindan had to use a number of shots in the film. The usual type of music is also absent. Instead, the sounds of the incidents are used to the maximum. In the film, different characters speak different dialects of Malayalam, for example the villagers speak pure Valluvanadan Malayalam of South Malabar, the overseer uses the Trivandrum Malayalam the fake Doctor uses Travancore Malayalam etc.

In this period Aravindan did a number of documentaries and short films. He composed music for films like Aaro Oral, Piravi and Ore Thooval Pakshikal. Aravindan's 1989 feature film Unni was an international co-production loosely based on experiences in Kerala of a group of American students, who played themselves. Aravindan's final project Vasthuhara (1991) about refugees in Bengal was based on C. V. Sreeraman's short story in the same name. The film had Mohanlal and Neena Gupta in major roles.

Aravindan died on 15 March 1991, before the release of Vasthuhara. The cause of death was a heart attack. He was aged just 55 when he died. The Kerala Chalachitra Film Society awards the Aravindan Puraskaram every year in the memory of G. Aravindan for the best debutant director in Indian languages.

== Awards ==
=== Civilian awards ===
- Padma Shri

=== National Film Awards ===
- 1974: Award for the Best Feature Film on the 25th Anniversary of India's Independence – Uttarayanam
- 1974: Best Feature Film in Malayalam – Uttarayanam
- 1978: Best Direction – Kanchana Sita
- 1979: Best Direction – Thampu
- 1986: Best Film – Chidambaram
- 1987: Best Direction – Oridathu
- 1991: Best Feature Film in Malayalam – Vasthuhara

=== Kerala State Film Awards ===
- 1974: Best Film – Uttarayanam
- 1974: Best Director – Uttarayanam
- 1974: Best Screenplay – Uttarayanam
- 1978: Second Best Film – Thampu
- 1978: Best Director – Thampu
- 1979: Best Film – Esthappan
- 1979: Best Children's Film – Kummatty
- 1979: Best Director – Esthappan
- 1981: Best Director – Pokkuveyil
- 1985: Best Film – Chidambaram
- 1985: Best Director – Chidambaram
- 1985: Best Documentary – The Brown Landscape
- 1986: Best Film – Oridathu
- 1986: Best Director – Oridathu
- 1986: Best Documentary – The Catch
- 1988: Best Music Director – Ore Thooval Pakshikal
- 1990: Best Film – Vasthuhara
- 1990: Best Director – Vasthuhara

=== Kerala Film Critics Association Awards ===
- 1978: Best Film – Thampu
- 1978: Best Director – Thampu
- 1979: Best Children's Film – Kummatty

== Filmography ==
=== Direction ===
Year	Title	English Title	Writer	Type
1974	Uttarayanam	Throne of Capricorn	Yes	Feature film
1977	Kanchana Sita	The Golden Substitute	Yes	Feature film
1978	Thampu	The Circus Tent	Yes	Feature film
1979	Kummatty	The Bogeyman		Feature film
1980	Esthappan	Stephen	Yes*	Feature film
1981	Pokkuveyil	Twilight	Yes	Feature film
1982	VT	V. T. Bhattathiripad		Documentary film
1985	The Seer Who Walks Alone	---		Documentary film
1985	Chidambaram	---	Yes	Feature film
1985	The Brown Landscape	---		Short film
1986	The Catch	---		Documentary film
1986	Oridathu	At a Place	Yes	Feature film
1987	Contours of Linear Rhythm	---		Documentary film
1988	Marattam	Masquerade	Yes	Television film
1988	Anadi-Dhara	---		Documentary film
1989	Unni	---		Feature film
1990	Sahaja	Spontaneous		Short film
1991	Vasthuhara	The Dispossessed	Yes*	Feature film

==== Notes ====
- He also wrote the story of Esthappan and the dialogues for Vasthuhara.

=== Other contributions ===
Year	Title	Director	Role
1978	Yaro Oraal	V. K. Pavithran	Composer
1980	Esthappan	Himself	Composer, editor
1988	Piravi	Shaji N. Karun	Composer
1989	Ore Thooval Pakshikal	K. Ravindran	Composer
