= Esthappan =

- Poster
- Directed by: G. Aravindan
- Written by: G. Aravindan
- Produced by: K. Ravindran Nair
- Starring: Rajan Kakkanadan; Krishnapuram Leela; Sudharma; Shobhana
- Cinematography: Shaji N. Karun
- Edited by: G. Aravindan
- Music by: Janardhan; G. Aravindan
- Production company: General Pictures
- Release date: 25 April 1980
- Country: India
- Language: Malayalam

Esthappan is a 1980 Malayalam film written and directed by G. Aravindan. Aravindan also co-composed the music and edited the film. Rajan Kakkanadan, Krishnapuram Leela, Sudharma and Shobhana form the cast. It won the Kerala State Film Awards for Best Film and Best Director.

== Synopsis ==
Esthappan, a fisherman, lives in a seashore colony of fishermen. The film presents him not as a conventional hero but as a mysterious figure remembered through the stories and opinions of the villagers. The first sequence of Esthappan is a long shot of him walking by the seashore, creating the illusion that he is walking over the waves and crossing the sea. Throughout the film, his life is recounted through anecdotes and local folklore. His supposed miraculous acts, such as printing his own money, drinking whisky without becoming intoxicated, calming rough seas, healing people, and appearing in different places at the same time, are narrated by members of the community. As a result, different people describe him in different ways: some see him as a prophet, saint, or miracle worker, while others view him as a thief, madman, or charlatan.

Esthappan remains an outsider who does not follow the ordinary routines of the fishing community. Instead of spending his life at sea like the other fishermen, he wanders along the shore, sings, helps children, and offers comfort to those in distress. His unusual behavior puzzles both the villagers and the local priest, who struggles to understand whether Esthappan's actions reflect holiness, eccentricity, or something else entirely. The conflicting stories about him reveal as much about the beliefs, fears, and hopes of the villagers as they do about Esthappan himself.

When Esthappan suddenly disappears from the colony, his absence creates anxiety and longing among the fishermen. The villagers are left wondering about his true nature and whether the stories surrounding him were fact or legend. As concern grows, the priest consoles them by saying that Esthappan will surely return. The film ends without resolving the mystery, leaving Esthappan transformed from a man into a legend whose memory lives on in the songs, stories, and expectations of the community.

== Cast ==
- Rajan Kakkanadan
- Krishnapuram Leela
- Sudharma
- Shobhana
- Gemini Ganesan

== Critical commentary ==
The character of Esthappan is always engaged in all sorts of things (in a moral way) to make people remind of Christ. The fishermen community of the place works (different sorts of ‘acts’) so hard and so do all other men and women of the locality. Yet the greatness of their acts is lost once the same community indulges without any moral concerns, in immoral and illegal acts. They lose the greatness of their effort (acts) through excessive drinking, gossiping, being promiscuous and through exploiting each other in many ways. This reprobate state of the people is what drives Esthappan to do what he does. He, who was once a fisherman now does no work other than doing things that will remind the people of Christ. He thinks that to work without a philosophy, is a waste. Therefore, his attempt is at the heart of the people who have forgotten Christ. In order to do that he comes to help people from diseases, from false acquisitions, from debt, from dangers etc. like Christ did. But his constant worries and thoughts while doing all these suggest us that he is not satisfied from these external acts alone. He is worried more about getting into the hearts of people where lay the real problem; the question of morality and conscience. Esthappan is not against established dogmas of the Church or against the practices of her. His attendance of mass celebrated in the church and his asking for the incenses are examples for this.
