= Kerala State Film Awards =

Award given by Kerala State Govt

- Current: 55th Kerala State Film Awards
- Kerala State Film Award Sculptures
- Awarded for: Excellence in cinematic achievements
- Country: India
- Presented by: Kerala State Chalachitra Academy
- First award: 1969
- Website: keralafilm.com

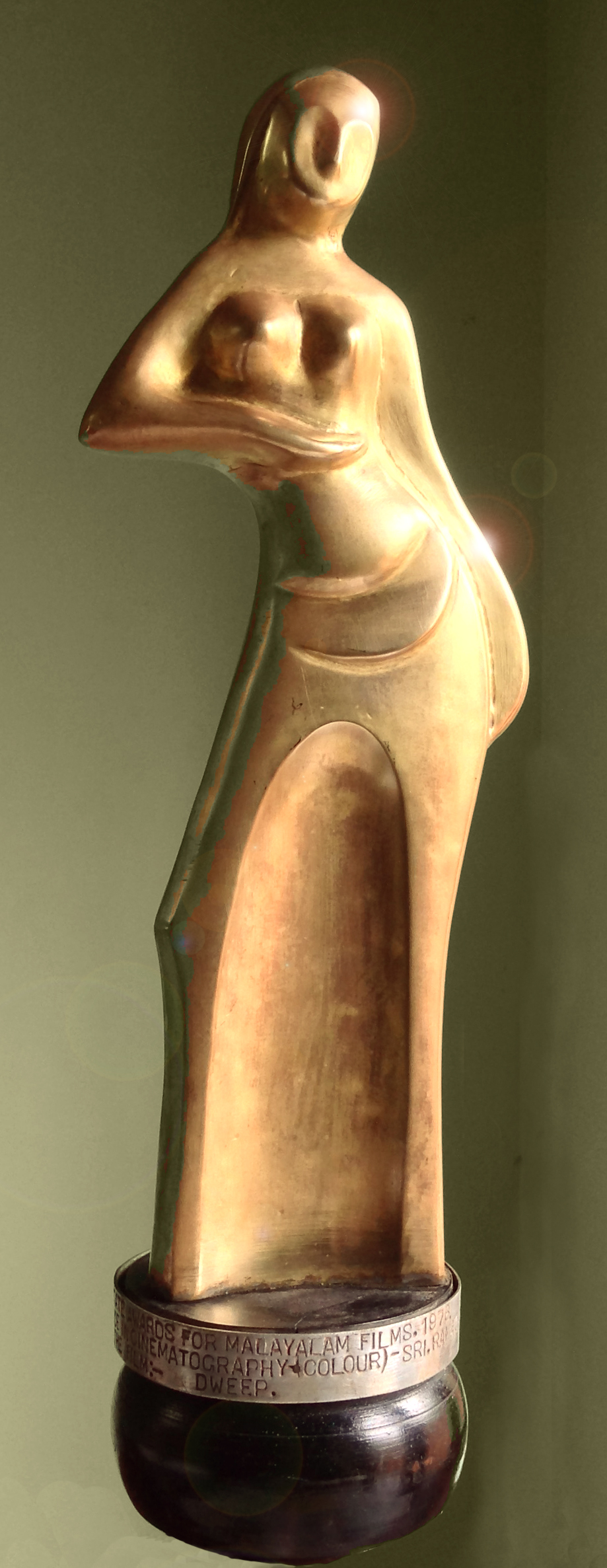
Award statuette, officially denoted as "replica" won by cinematographer Ramachandra Babu for Dweepu (1976).

The Kerala State Film Awards are the film awards for a motion picture made in Kerala. The awards were instituted in 1969 by the Department of Cultural Affairs, Government of Kerala and since 1998 have been bestowed by Kerala State Chalachitra Academy on behalf of the Department of Cultural Affairs.

The awardees are decided by an independent jury formed by the academy and the Department of Cultural Affairs, Kerala. The jury usually consists of eminent personalities from the film industry. For the awards for literature on cinema, a separate jury is formed. The academy annually invites submission for the awards and the jury analyses the films that are submitted before deciding the winners. The awards intend to promote films with artistic values and encourage artists, technicians and producers. The awards are declared by the Minister for Cultural Affairs and are presented by the Chief Minister of Kerala.

== List of awards ==
The number of awards varies from year to year, considering the changing scenario of motion picture arts within and outside the state of Kerala. The latest number of awards is over 30; the original number of awards in 1969 was 15.

- J. C. Daniel Award (Lifetime Achievement Awards) for "Outstanding contributions to Malayalam cinema".
- Best Film: A cash award of Rs.100,000/-, a replica and a certificate to the producer. A cash award of Rs.40,000/-, a replica and a certificate to the director
- Second Best Film: A cash award of Rs.60,000/-, a replica and a certificate to the producer. A cash award of Rs.30,000/-, a replica and a certificate to the director
- Kerala State Film Award for Best Short Film
- Best Director: A cash award of Rs.50,000/-, a replica
- Best Actor: A cash award of 1 Lakh, a replica and a certificate
- Best Actress: A cash award of 1 Lakh, a replica and a certificate
- Best Character Actor: A cash award of Rs.50000/-, a replica and a certificate
- Best Character Actress: A cash award of Rs.50000/-, a replica and a certificate
- Second Best Actor: A cash award of Rs.50000/-, a replica and a certificate
- Second Best Actress: A cash award of Rs.50000/-, a replica and a certificate
- Best Comedian: (1969-72, 2008-2013. Discontinued after 2013)
- Best Child Artist: A cash award of Rs.50000/-, a replica and a certificate
- Best Story: A cash award of Rs.50000/-, a replica and a certificate
- Best Screenplay: A cash award of Rs.15,000/-, a replica and a certificate
- Best Cinematography: A cash award of Rs.15,000/-, a replica and a certificate
- Best Lyrics: A cash award of Rs.15,000/-, a replica and a certificate
- Best Music Director: A cash award of Rs.15,000/-, a replica and a certificate
- Best Background Music: A cash award of Rs.15,000/-, a replica and a certificate
- Best Singer: A cash award of Rs.15,000/-, a replica and a certificate
- Best Film Editor: A cash award of Rs.15,000/-, a replica and a certificate
- Best Art Director: A cash award of Rs.15,000/-, a replica and a certificate
- Best Sound Recordist: A cash award of Rs.15,000/-, a replica and a certificate
- Best Processing Lab: A cash award of Rs.15,000/-, a replica and a certificate
- Best Makeup Artist: A cash award of Rs.15,000/-, a replica and a certificate
- Best Costume Designer: A cash award of Rs.15,000/-, a replica and a certificate
- Best Dubbing Artist: A cash award of Rs.7,500/-, a replica and a certificate each
- Best Choreography: A cash award of Rs.15,000/-, a replica and a certificate
- Best Film with Popular Appeal and Aesthetic Value: To the producer and directnor
- Best Children's Film: To the producer and director
- Best Debut Director
- Special Jury Award: A cash award of Rs.30,000/-, a replica and a certificate
- Special Mention: A replica and a certificate
- Best Documentary: A cash award of Rs.15,000/-, a replica and a certificate to the producer. A cash award of Rs.9,000/-, a replica and a certificate to the director
- Best Book on Cinema: A cash award of Rs.15,000/-, a replica and a certificate
- Best Article on Cinema: A cash award of Rs.8,000/-, a replica and a certificate

== Jury ==
Year	Chairperson	Designation	Ref.
1969	C. I. Parameswaran Pillai		
1970	M. K. Kumaran		
1971	K. A. Damodara Menon		
1972	P. K. Nair		
1973	P. R. S. Pillai	Director	
1974	P. R. S. Pillai	Director	
1975	P. R. S. Pillai	Director	
1976	K. P. Udayabhanu	Singer, Music Director	
1977	Prof. S. Gupthan Nair		
1978	K. M. George	Writer	
1979	Thakazhi Sivasankara Pillai	Writer	
1980	P. R. S. Pillai	Director	
1981	Dr. S. K. Nair		
1982	K. S. Sethumadhavan	Director	
1983	N. V. K. Murthy		
1984	M. V. Krishnaswamy	Director	
1985	Basu Bhattacharya	Director	
1986	Ashok Kumar	Actor	
1987	Komal Swaminathan	Theater personality, director, journalist	
1988	Buddhadeb Dasgupta	Director	
1989	M. S. Sathyu	Director	
1990	Bharath Gopi	Actor, Director	
1991	M. O. Joseph	Producer	
1992	Prema Karanth	Director	
1993	John Sankaramangalam	Director	
1994	K. G. George	Director	
1995	Malayatoor Ramakrishnan	Writer, I. A. S. Officer (Rtd)	
1996	Kumar Shahani	Director	
1997	K. P. Kumaran	Director	
1998	Balu Mahendra	Director	
1999	Sai Paranjpye	Director	
2000	Saeed Akhtar Mirza	Director	
2001	Priyadarshan	Director	
2002	K. G. George	Director	
2003	Hariharan	Director	
2004	Sreekumaran Thampi	Lyricist, Director	
2005	Sibi Malayil	Director	
2006	T. K. Rajeev Kumar	Director	
2007	Jahnu Barua	Director	
2008	Girish Kasaravalli	Director	
2009	Sai Paranjpye	Director	
2010	Buddhadeb Dasgupta	Director	
2011	K. Bhagyaraj	Actor, Director	
2012	I. V. Sasi	Director	
2013	Bharathi Raja	Director	
2014	John Paul Puthusery	Writer	
2015	M. Mohan	Director	
2016	A. K. Bir	Cinematographer, Director	
2017	T. V. Chandran	Director	
2018	Kumar Shahani	Director	
2019	Madhu Ambatt	Cinematographer	
2020	Suhasini Mani Ratnam	Actress, Director, Script Writer	
2021	Saeed Akhtar Mirza	Director	
2022	Goutam Ghose	Director	
2023	Sudhir Mishra	Director, Actor	
2024	Prakash Raj	Actor, Director	

== List of Movies with Most Awards in Each Year ==
Sl. No.	Year	Movie	No of Awards Won
1	1969	Kadalppalam	5
2	1970	Aranazhika Neram	5
3	1971	Karakanakadal; Sindooracheppu	4
4	1972	Panitheeratha Veedu	5
5	1973	Nirmaalyam	8
6	1974	Utharayanam	6
7	1975	Swapnadanam	6
8	1976	Manimuzhakkam; Aalinganam	4
9	1977	Kodiyettam	5
10	1978	Bandhanam	4
11	1979	Esthappan	4
12	1980	Manjil Virinja Pookkal; Oppol, Chamaram	6; 5
13	1981	Elippathayam	3
14	1982	Ormakkayi	7
15	1983	Ente Mamattikkuttiyammakku	5
16	1984	Mukhamukham	5
17	1985	Chidambaram	5
18	1986	Onnu Muthal Poojyam Vare	6
19	1987	Swathi Thirunal	5
20	1988	Ore Thooval Pakshikal; Piravi; Rugmini; Vaisali	3
21	1989	Oru Vadakkan Veeragatha	8
22	1990	Perumthachan	4
23	1991	Bharatham	5
24	1992	Daivathinte Vikrithikal; Aadhaaram	4
25	1993	Vidheyan; Ghazal, Sopanam	6; 5
26	1994	Swaham; Parinayam, Thenmavin Kombath	6; 5
27	1995	Kaalapani; Kazhakam	7; 5
28	1996	Desadanam; Kaanaakkinaavu	7; 5
29	1997	Bhoothakkannadi; Kaliyattam; Guru; Ennu Swantham Janakikutty; Janmadinam	3
30	1998	Agnisakshi	9
31	1999	Vanaprastham	6
32	2000	Sayahnam; Mazha, Madhuranombarakattu	7; 5
33	2001	Sesham	5
34	2002	Nizhalkuthu; Bhavam	7; 5
35	2003	Margam; Paadam Onnu: Oru Vilapam, Ente Veedu Appuntem	7; 5
36	2004	Akale; Oridam, Kaazhcha, Perumazhakkalam	6; 5
37	2005	Thanmathra; Anandabhadram	5
38	2006	Rathri Mazha	5
39	2007	Adayalangal	5
40	2008	Oru Pennum Randaanum; Bioscope	5
41	2009	Kerala Varma Pazhassi Raja	8
42	2010	Adaminte Makan Abu; Yugapurushan	4
43	2011	Ivan Megharoopan	4
44	2012	Celluloid	7
45	2013	Ayaal	5
46	2014	Iyobinte Pusthakam	5
47	2015	Charlie; Ennu Ninte Moideen	8; 7
48	2016	Guppy; Kaadu Pookkunna Neram	5
49	2017	Take Off	5
50	2018	Carbon; Sudani From Nigeria	6; 5
51	2019	Kumbalangi Nights	4
52	2020	Sufiyum Sujatayum	5
53	2021	Joji; Minnal Murali	4
54	2022	Nna Thaan Case Kodu	7
55	2023	Aadujeevitham	9
56	2024	Manjummel Boys	11

== Repeated wins ==
List of frequent winners
Artist	Wins
K. J. Yesudas	26
M. T. Vasudevan Nair	21
Adoor Gopalakrishnan	17
K. S. Chithra	16
G. Aravindan	16
O. N. V. Kurup	14
Bharathan	12
S. Janaki	11
M. Jayachandran	11
Mammootty	11

Most successive wins
Artist	Wins	Years
K. S. Chithra	11	1985-95
K. J. Yesudas	8	1979-86
S. Janaki	6	1979-84
K. J. Yesudas	6	1993-98

List of movies with most awards
Movie	Year	No. of Awards won
Manjummel Boys	2024	10
Agnisakshi	1998	9
Aadujeevitham	2023	9
Nirmalyam	1973	8
Oru Vadakkan Veeragatha	1989	8
Kerala Varma Pazhassi Raja	2009	8
Charlie	2015	8
Ormakkayi	1982	7
Kaalapani	1995	7
Desadanam	1996	7
Sayahnam	2000	7
Nizhalkuthu	2002	7
Margam	2003	7
Celluloid	2012	7
Ennu Ninte Moideen	2015	7
Nna Thaan Case Kodu	2022	7

== See also ==
- 2006 Kerala State Film Awards
- 2009 Kerala State Film Awards
- 2010 Kerala State Film Awards
- 2016 Kerala State Film Awards
