= P Raman Nair =

Indian film editor

P. Raman Nair
- Occupation: Film editor

P. Raman Nair was a film editor who was active in Malayalam cinema between 1966 and 1998. He edited at least 14 feature films during this period. He won the Kerala State Film Award for Best Editor in 1978 for his work on Yaro Oraal and Uthradarathri.

Films and documentaries edited by him have won 15 state, national, and international awards. These include Uthradarathri, Yaaro Oral, Ore Thoovalpakshikal, Basheer the Man, Unnikkuttanu Joli Kitti, Ilayum Mullum, Swaham, and Poothiruvathira Ravil. Poothiruvathira Ravil also won the Kerala State Film Award for the Best Story.

Films and documentaries edited by him have been nominated for the Palme d'Or, as well as entered into or screened at notable international film festivals (e.g., Cannes, Venice, Toronto, Montreal, Sydney, Cairo, and the International Film Festival of India, IFFI). These films and documentaries include Ilayum Mullum, Swaham, and Basheer the Man.

A Film and Television Institute of India (FTII) student film, The Betrayal (1966), edited by P. Raman Nair, has been digitized by the National Film Archive of India as part of the National Film Heritage Mission

In his two-decade career, he worked with film directors including VK Pavithran, Chintha Ravi, P. Sreekumar, V. R. Gopinath, M. G. Sasi, Shaji N. Karun, M. A. Rahman, G. S. Panicker, and Balachandra Menon. He directed the film Swarnapakshikal, in addition to editing it. He is also credited as the screenwriter for Ekakini and Ashwathama.

== Personal ==
P. Raman Nair is the brother of PK Nair, Indian film archivist, film scholar, and founder/director of the National Film Archive of India (NFAI).

== Critical responses ==
"P K Nair and his late brother and editor P R Nair will definitely remain as two luminous names in the history of Indian cinema,” said director K P Kumaran.

== Filmography ==
- The Betrayal (1966)- FTII Student film
- Uthradarathri (1978)
- Yaaro Oral (1978)
- Iniyum Marichittillatha Nammal (1980)
- Seetha (1980)
- Swarnappakshikal (1981)
- Sahyante Makan (1982)
- Kayyum Thalayum Purathidaruthu (1985)
- Basheer the Man (1987) - Documentary
- Ore Thoovalpakshikal (1988)
- Unnikkutanu Joli Kitti (1990)
- Ilayum Mullum (1994)
- Swaham (1994)
- Poothiruvathira Ravil (1998)
