= C. N. Karunakaran =

Indian painter and illustrator

C.N. Karunakaran
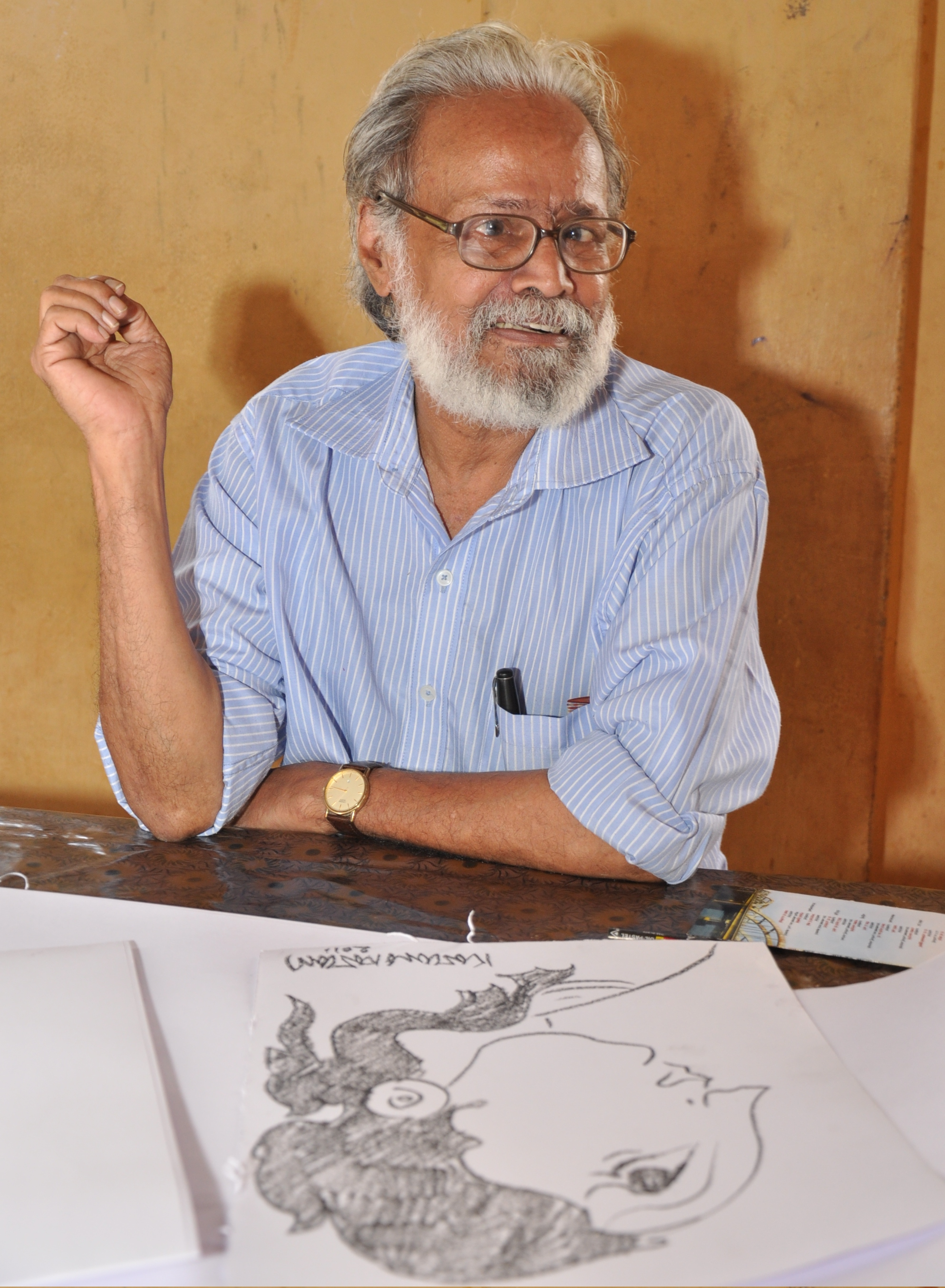
- Born: 1940; Brahmakulam, Thrissur, Kerala, India
- Died: 14 December 2013 (aged 73); Kochi, Kerala
- Resting place: Corporation of Cochin Ravipuram Crematorium
- Occupations: Painter, art director, illustrator
- Spouse: Easwari
- Children: 2
- Awards: 1956 Tamil Nadu State Gold Medal; 1964 Madras Lalit Kala Academy Award; 1971 Kerala Lalithakala Akademi Award; 1972 Kerala Lalithakala Akademi Award; 1975 Kerala Lalithakala Akademi Award); 2000 P. T. Bhaskara Panicker Award; 2003 Malayattoor Ramakrishnan Award; 2005 Kerala Lalithakala Akademi Fellowship

C. N. Karunakaran (1940 – 14 December 2013) was an Indian painter, illustrator and art director from Kerala. He was the chairman of the Kerala Lalitakala Academy and a recipient of several honours, including the Kerala Lalithakala Akademi Award, which he won three times. The Akademi honoured him again with the fellowship in 2005.

== Biography ==
C. N. Karunakaran was born in 1940 at Brahmakulam, a village near Guruvayur in Thrissur District of Kerala. He contracted typhoid while he was a child and the complications from the disease crippled him in one of his legs. Through most of his childhood, he was undergoing ayurvedic treatment, because of which he could not pursue academic studies. His formal training in art was at the Government College of Fine Arts, Chennai where he learned under such as D. P. Roy Choudhury and K. C. S. Paniker to secure two diplomas; one in design and another in advanced painting.

He stayed in Chennai after his studies, making advertisement films and working as an art director in a few Malayalam films. In 1970, he shifted his base to Kochi where he became involved with Kerala Kalapeedom (Kerala Institute of Arts). Here, he had the opportunity to interact with a host of like-minded people such as M. V. Devan, Kanayi Kunhiraman, A. C. K. Raja, Namboothiri, K. P. Soman, M. K. K. Nair, C. N. Sreekantan Nair, M. K. Sanu, Pattathuvila Karunakaran, M. Thomas Mathew and T. Ramachandran. Three years later, he founded Chitrakoodam, the first privately owned art gallery in Kerala, but the initiative ran only for four years until 1977. He was also involved with Ochre, another private art gallery in Kochi. Subsequently, he focused his career mainly on painting and illustrations; Manorama Weekly, Kalakaumudi, Kerala Kaumudi Weekly, Malayalanadu, Chintha, Deshabhimani Weekly, Kumkumam, Mathrubhumi Weekly, Bhashaposhini and India Today were some of the publications he illustrated for. He also illustrated Lore and Legends of Kerala, the English translation of Aithihyamala, published by Oxford University Press.

Karaunakaran as married to Easwari, and the couple had a son, Ayillyan and a daughter, Ammini. He died in Kochi on 14 December 2013, at the age of 73, succumbing to cardiac failure following a brief period of illness. He was cremated at the Corporation of Cochin Ravipuram Crematorium. His son, Ayillyan Karunakaran, is an advertisement filmmaker.

== Legacy ==
"the untiring cartographer of female geography… the essence of the subject remains a constant, it is the flavor of the subject that moves to create and recreate," said Tanya Abraham, art critic, on Karanakaran.

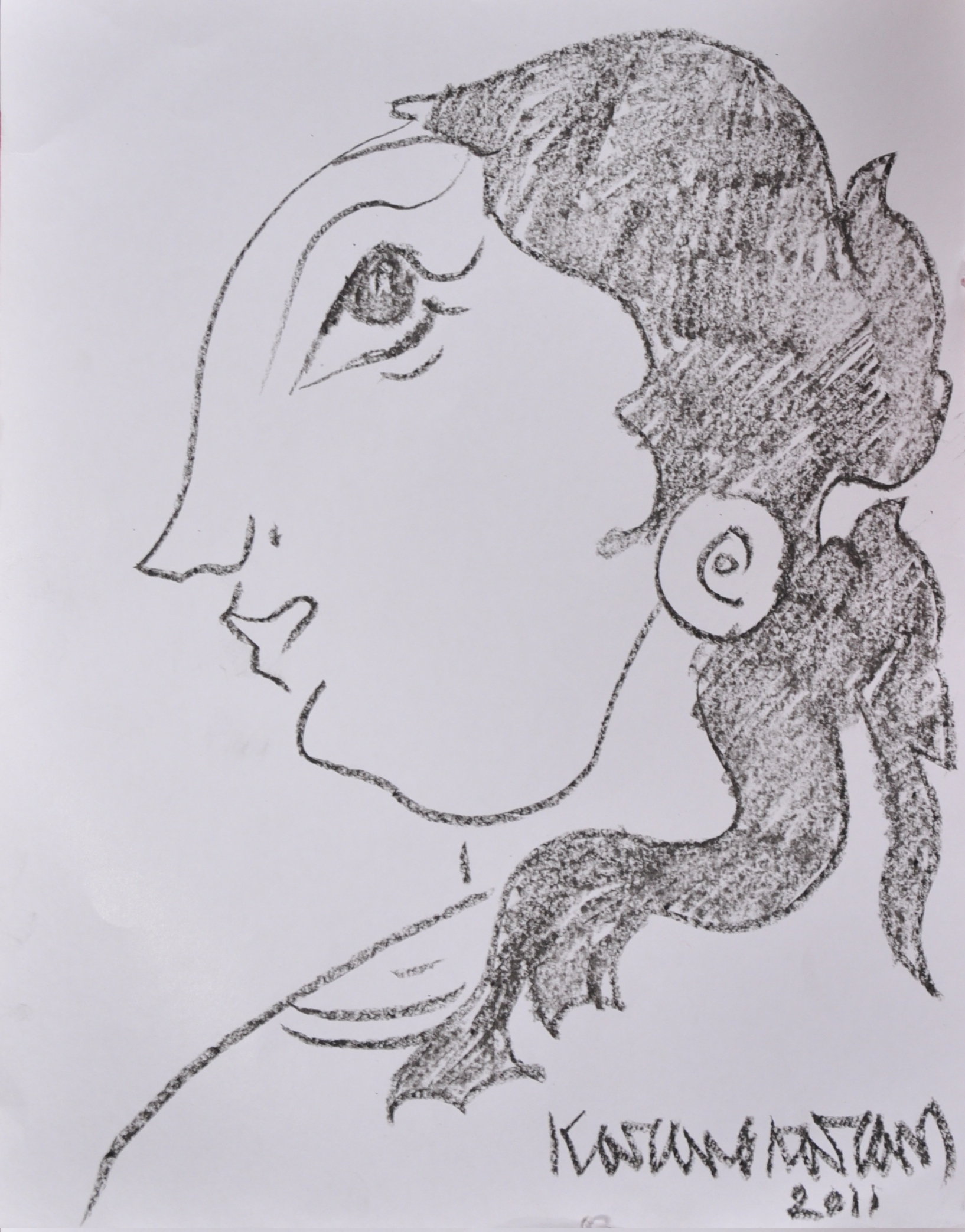
A drawing by C. N. Karunakaran

One of the first assignments Karunakaran undertook after returning to Kerala from Chennai was the restoration of murals at Guruvayur temple. He participated in several exhibitions, both group and solo, at various places in India and abroad, including the Embassy of India in Washington, Asian Art Gallery, Virginia, Brazilian cities like Rio de Janeiro, Paraty, São Paulo and Brasília, Asian Art Gallery, Vienna and Kuwait City. During his stay in Chennai, he was also involved with the Madras Design Demonstration Centre, a unit of the Government of Tamil Nadu where he assisted the centre in improving the handicrafts business and illustrated a number of literary works in book form.

Karaunakaran's debut in films was in 1978 when he designed the production of Ekakini, directed by G. S. Panicker. The next year, when K. R. Mohanan made his debut film, Ashwadhamavu, Karunakaran started his career as an art director, in which he also played a small part. He went on to work for four more films, Akkare (1984) by K. N. Sasidharan, Purushartham (1986) by K. R. Mohanan, Ore Thooval Pakshikal (1988) by Chintha Ravi and Alicinte Anveshanam (1989) by T. V. Chandran.

== Awards and honours ==
His performance during his student years at the Government College of Fine Arts, Chennai earned him the gold medal of the Government of Madras for the best outgoing student in 1956. Before he returned to Kerala, he received the annual award of Madras Lalit Kala Akademi in 1964. He received the Kerala Lalithakala Akademi Award three times, twice in succession in 1971 and 1972 and later, in 1975. He was selected for the P. T. Bhaskara Panicker Award in 2000 and for the Malayattoor Ramakrishnan Award in 2003. The Kerala Lalithakala Akademi indicted him as a distinguished fellow in 2005; Akademi honoured him again in 2009, with Raja Ravi Varma Puraskaram, their highest award. Artist Sathypal, the former chairman of the Kerala Lalithakala Akademi, has published a book, Mythic Imagination: Art of C.N. Karunakaran, which covers Karaunakaran's work from 1950s to 2011.

== Filmography ==
=== As art director ===
- Ashwadhamavu (1979)
- Akkare (1984)
- Purushartham (1986)
- Ore Thooval Pakshikal (1988)
- Alicinte Anveshanam (1989)

=== As designer ===
- Ekakini (1978)

=== As actor ===
- Ashwadhamavu (1979)

== Solo exhibitions ==
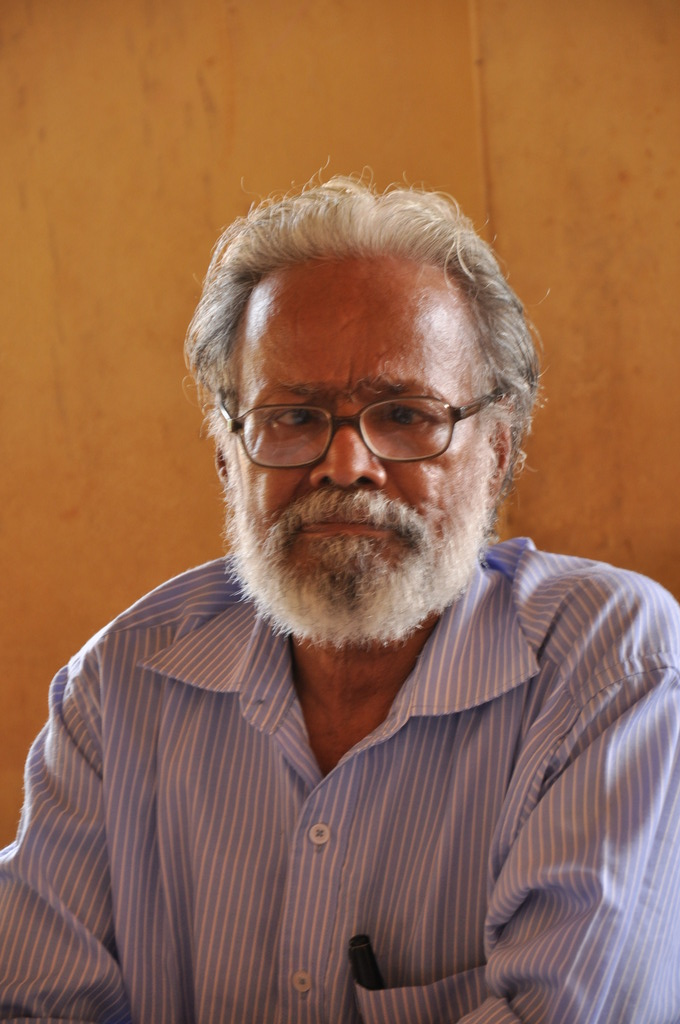
Karunakaran at Vidyarangam State Sahityolsavam, Alwaye

The following is a list of his solo exhibitions of paintings.

- Madras - 1968, 1975 & 1993
- Kochi - 1970, 1984, 1992, 1994, 1996, 1997, 1998, 2000, 2001 & 2005
- Calicut - 1973, 1993 & 1998
- Thiruvananthapuram - 1995, 1996, 1998 & 2000
- Jehangir Art Gallery, Mumbai - 1996, 2000 & 2005
- Taj Art Gallery, Mumbai - 1997 & 2000
- The Gallery Leela, Mumbai - 1997
- ABC Art Gallery, Varanasi - 1999
- Galeria Ralino, Goa - 1999
- Art Konsult Gallery, New Delhi - 2000
- Nehru Centre, Mumbai-2001, 2004
- Kottayam- 2001
- Thrissur- 2001
- Rio de Janeiro, Brazil - 2002
- Paraty, Brazil- 2002
- São Paulo, Brazil - 2002
- Brasília, Brazil - 2002
- Embassy of India Washington DC, USA - 2003
- Adithi Indian Cuisine, Washington DC, USA - 2003
- Asian Art Gallery, Vienna - 2003
- Kuwait City - 2003
- Travancore Gallery, New Delhi - 2006
