= GS Panicker =

Indian director (1944–2022)

- Born: 1944; Thiruvananthapuram
- Died: 22 August 2022 (aged 78); Chennai, India
- Occupations: Film director; Screen writer; film producer
- Years active: 1978-1991

GS Panicker was an Indian film director, screenwriter, and producer who was active primarily in his native Malayalam, apart from Kannada cinema, from 1978 to 1991. For Sahyante Makan (1982), he won the Kerala State Award for Best Children's Film. His films Prakrithi Manohari (1980) and Paandavapuram (1986) were selected to the Indian Panorama section of the International Film Festival of India (IFFI). His film Ekakini (1978) won the Kerala State Film Award for Best Editor.

== Early life ==
During his school and pre-graduation days, Panicker was active in amateur theater in his hometown of Chirayinkeezhu in the Thiruvananthapuram district of Kerala. He was an avid filmgoer. After graduating, he moved to Chennai to learn about cinema. A year later, he gained admission to the film direction and screenplay-writing program at FTII Pune.

== Career ==
His initial scripts did not receive much attention. He then moved to Canada and worked in the television sector for three years to secure the budget for his maiden movie.

On his return, he made his debut as a director and producer with Ekakini, considered the first road movie in Malayalam. Between 1980 and 1991, he directed three feature films (Prakrithi Manohari, Sahyante Makan, Paandavapuram); Vaasarashayya, a docu-fiction; and Neelavasantham, a telefilm, all in Malayalam. Sahyante Makan is a children's film. During the same period, he directed Romanchana (1985), a Kannada film.

All his films have been commercially successful, with Vaasarashayya bringing bumper collections and being dubbed into multiple Indian languages.

== Death ==
GS Panicker passed away while under treatment at a private hospital in Chennai in August 2022. He is survived by his wife, son, and daughter.

== Filmography ==
- Ekakini (1978)
- Prakrithi Manohari (1980)
- Sahyante Makan (1982)
- Romanchana (1985)
- Paandavapuram (1986)
- Vaasarashayya (1993)
- Neelavasantham (1991)
- Bhoothapandi
- Mid Summer Dreams (2018) – Shelved project
