= Government Engineering College, Thrissur =

Engineering college in Kerala, India

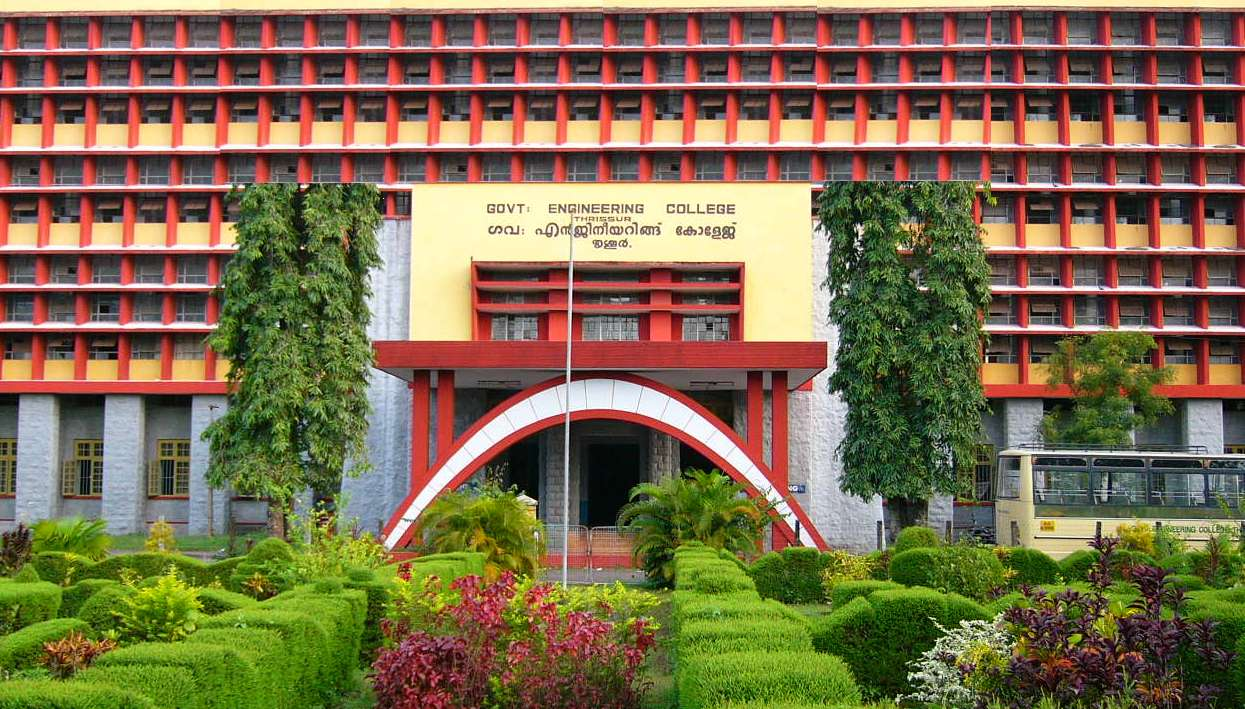
- Main block of the institute at Thrissur
- Other name: GEC-T
- Motto: Yoga Karmasu Kaushalam
- Motto in English: Perfection in skill through practice
- Type: Public Institute for Technology and Research
- Established: 1957
- Academic affiliations: University of Kerala (1957-1968); University of Calicut (1968-2015); APJ Abdul Kalam Technological University (since 2015)
- Principal: Dr. Solomon P A
- Location: Thrissur, Kerala, India
- Campus: 75 acres (0.30 km^{2})
- Website: gectcr.ac.in

The Government Engineering College Thrissur (GEC-T) is a public engineering and research institute located in Thrissur, Kerala, India. During its establishment in 1957, it was the second-oldest public engineering institute to be established in the state of Kerala after CET (1939) and the first public institute of technology to be established after the formation of the state in 1956. The institute is affiliated to the APJ Abdul Kalam Technological University (KTU) since its inception in 2015.

== History ==
The institute was originally located at the Chembukkavu campus of the Maharaja's Technological Institute in 1957. The foundation stone of the institute was laid by the late Pandit Jawarharlal Nehru, the first Prime Minister of India, on 26 April 1958. The institute was shifted into its present campus in October 1960. The institute was formally inaugurated by late Pattom A. Thanu Pillai, former Chief Minister of Kerala, on 2 February 1962. The campus is spread over an area of 75 acres (0.30 km^{2}) and is located at Ramavarmapuram which is 5 km from the centre of Thrissur and 6 km from Thrissur Railway station.

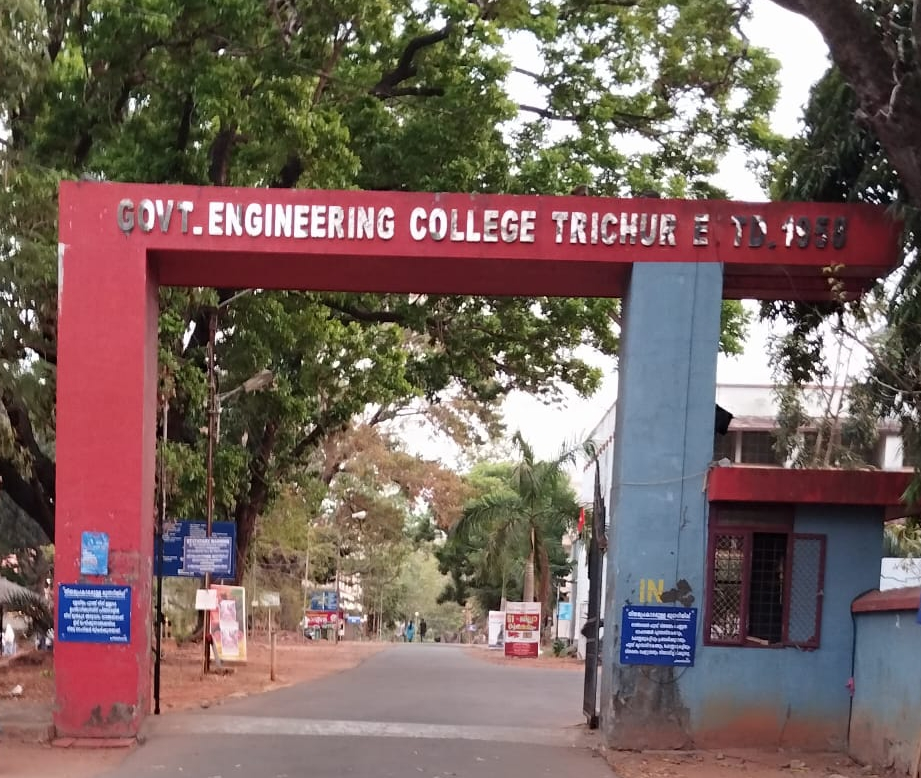
Entrance gate of Government engineering college Thrissur

Besides the regular B-Tech courses, the institute also offers a postgraduate Course in Computer Applications (MCA), and postgraduate programmes in other subjects. Courses offered by the institute have been accredited by the National Board of Accreditation, AICTE, and Council of Architecture (B.Arch).

=== Rankings ===
University and college rankings

Engineering – India
- NIRF (2024): 201-300

The National Institutional Ranking Framework (NIRF) ranked it between 201-300 band in engineering institutes of India in 2024.

== Student life ==
The College Union conducts the annual National Level Tech fest Dyuthi which includes technical, cultural as well as sporting events.

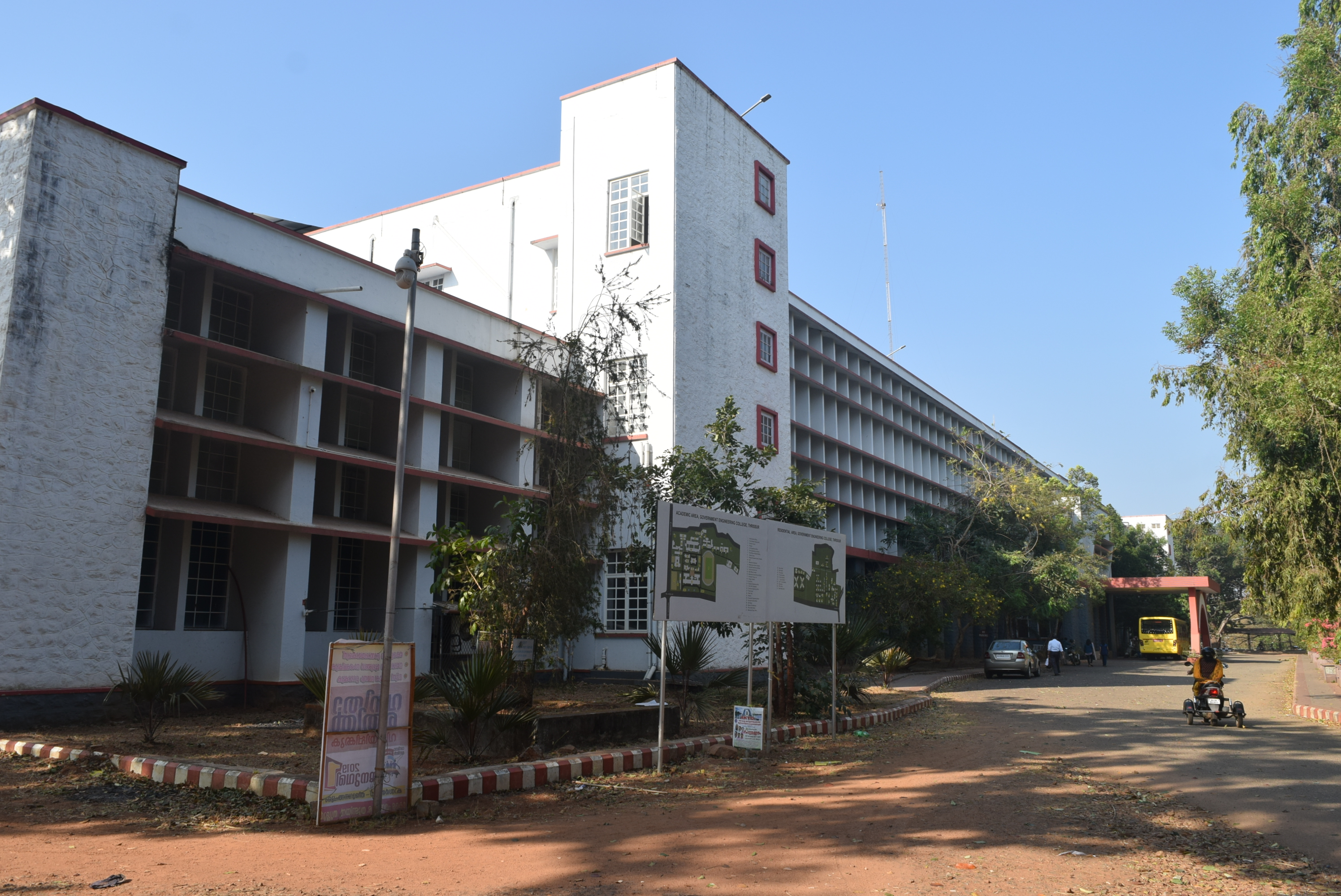
Main block of Government engineering college Thrissur

A TEDx event was organised by students of GEC, Thrissur in April 2018. The theme of the event was "Reality Check". This was the first TEDx event in Central Kerala.

== Notable alumni ==
- K Radhakrishnan, Padma Bhushan, Former Chairman, Indian Space Research Organisation
- M. Chandra Dathan, Padmashree, Former Director, Vikram Sarabhai Space Centre (VSSC)
- Babu Bharadwaj, writer and journalist
- T. G. Ravi, Malayalam film actor and MD of Suntec Tyres
- Anand Neelakantan, writer
- Sreekumaran Thampi, Lyricist, director, producer, screenwriter
- V. T. Balram, Former MLA, Kerala Legislative Assembly
- Sagar Surya, actor
