= Daaliya Pookkal =

- Directed by: Prathap Singh
- Written by: P. N. Chandran
- Screenplay by: P. N. Chandran
- Starring: Pappan; Roopesh; Shobha; Jameela Malik
- Cinematography: Beypore Mani
- Music by: Kanjangad Ramachandran
- Production company: Akshara Films
- Distributed by: Akshara Films
- Release date: 21 March 1980
- Country: India
- Language: Malayalam

Daaliya Pookkal is a 1980 Indian Malayalam film, directed by Prathap Singh. The film stars Pappan, Roopesh, Shobha and Jameela Malik in the lead roles. The film has musical score by Kanjangad Ramachandran.

== Cast ==
- Pappan
- Roopesh
- Shobha
- Jameela Malik
- M. G. Soman
- Mala Aravindan
- Mallika Sukumaran
- P. K. Venukkuttan Nair

== Soundtrack ==
Kanjangad Ramachandran composed the music and K. K. Venugopal wrote the lyrics for the film's songs.

No.	Song	Singers	Lyrics	Length (m:ss)
1	"Rajanigandhikal Vidarum"	Vani Jairam	K. K. Venugopal	
2	"Swapna Bhoovil"	Jolly Abraham	K. K. Venugopal	
