= Raja Ravi Varma Puraskaram =

Arts award in Kerala, India

- Award for individual contributions to art and culture
- Awarded for: Art and culture
- Sponsored by: Kerala Lalithakala Akademi
- Reward: ₹3 lakh
- First award: 2001
- Final award: 2022

Highlights
- First winner: K. G. Subramanyan

The Raja Ravi Varma Puraskaram is an annual award given by the Kerala Lalithakala Akademi to a person showing excellence in the field of art and culture. The award is named after Raja Ravi Varma, a Malayali painter and artist. It was instituted by the Government of Kerala in 2001 to honour outstanding painters and sculptors from Kerala. The first recipient was K. G. Subramanyan.

== List of winners ==
Year	Awardee	Image
2001	K. G. Subramanyan	
2002	M. V. Devan	
2003	A. Ramachandran	
2004	Karuvattu Mana Vasudevan Namboothiri	
2005	Kanayi Kunhiraman	
2006	V. S. Valiathan	
2007	M. F. Husain	
2008	Gulam Mohammed Sheikh	
2009	C. N. Karunakaran	
2010	Ganesh Pyne	
2011	C. L. Porinchukutty	
2012	Yusuf Arakkal	
2013	K. V. Haridasan	
2014	Balan Nambiar	
2015	Akkitham Narayanan	
2016	Anila Jacob	
2017	P. Gopinath	
2018	Paris Viswanathan	
2019	B. D. Dethan	
2020		
2021		
2022	Surendran Nair	
