= Babu Bharadwaj =

Malayalam–language writer and journalist (1948–2016)

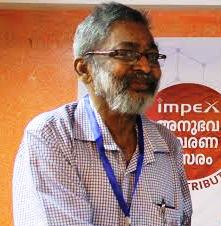
- Born: 15 January 1948; Chemancheri, Madras State, India
- Died: 30 March 2016 (aged 68); Calicut, Kerala, India
- Education: Malabar Christian College, Calicut; Government Engineering College, Trichur
- Occupations: Civil engineer, writer, journalist, film producer
- Writing career
- Language: Malayalam
- Notable works: Pravasiyude Kurippukal, Kalapangalkkoru Grihapadam
- Notable awards: Kerala Sahitya Akademi Award; Abu Dhabi Sakthi Award

Babu Bharadwaj (1948–2016) was a Malayalam-language writer and journalist from Kerala, India.

== Life ==
Born in Chemancheri, Calicut as the son of M. R. Vijayaraghavan and K. P. Bhavani, Bharadwaj studied at Poyilkavu High School and Malabar Christian College, Calicut and Government Engineering College, Trichur. He was actively involved in student politics and was the first national joint secretary of Students' Federation of India (SFI).

Bharadwaj started his journalistic career with the left-leaning Malayalam magazine Chintha. He also worked for the television media; he was the Programme Head for MediaOne TV and Creative Executive for Kairali TV. In 2006, he founded the Malayalam online news portal DoolNews.

A civil engineer by profession, he worked in Saudi Arabia for a long time and many of his literary works focused on the lives of Indian expatriates in the Persian Gulf region. He won the Kerala Sahitya Akademi Award for Novel for Kalapangalkkoru Grihapadam (2006). His other works include Pravasiyude Kurippukal, Shavaghoshayathra, Puppet Theatre, Pravasiyude Vazhiyambalangal, Panchakalyani and Adrushya Nagarangal. He also produced the Malayalam film Iniyum Marichittillatha Nammal (1980) directed by Chintha Ravi.

He died on 30 March 2016 of heart-related ailments.
