= Dethan =

Dethan is a surname. Notable people with the surname includes:

- B. D. Dethan (born 1946), Indian painter
- Isabelle Dethan (born 1967), French comic book artist
- Victor Dethan (born 2004), Indonesian professional footballer
