= Sathish Kalathil =

Indian film director

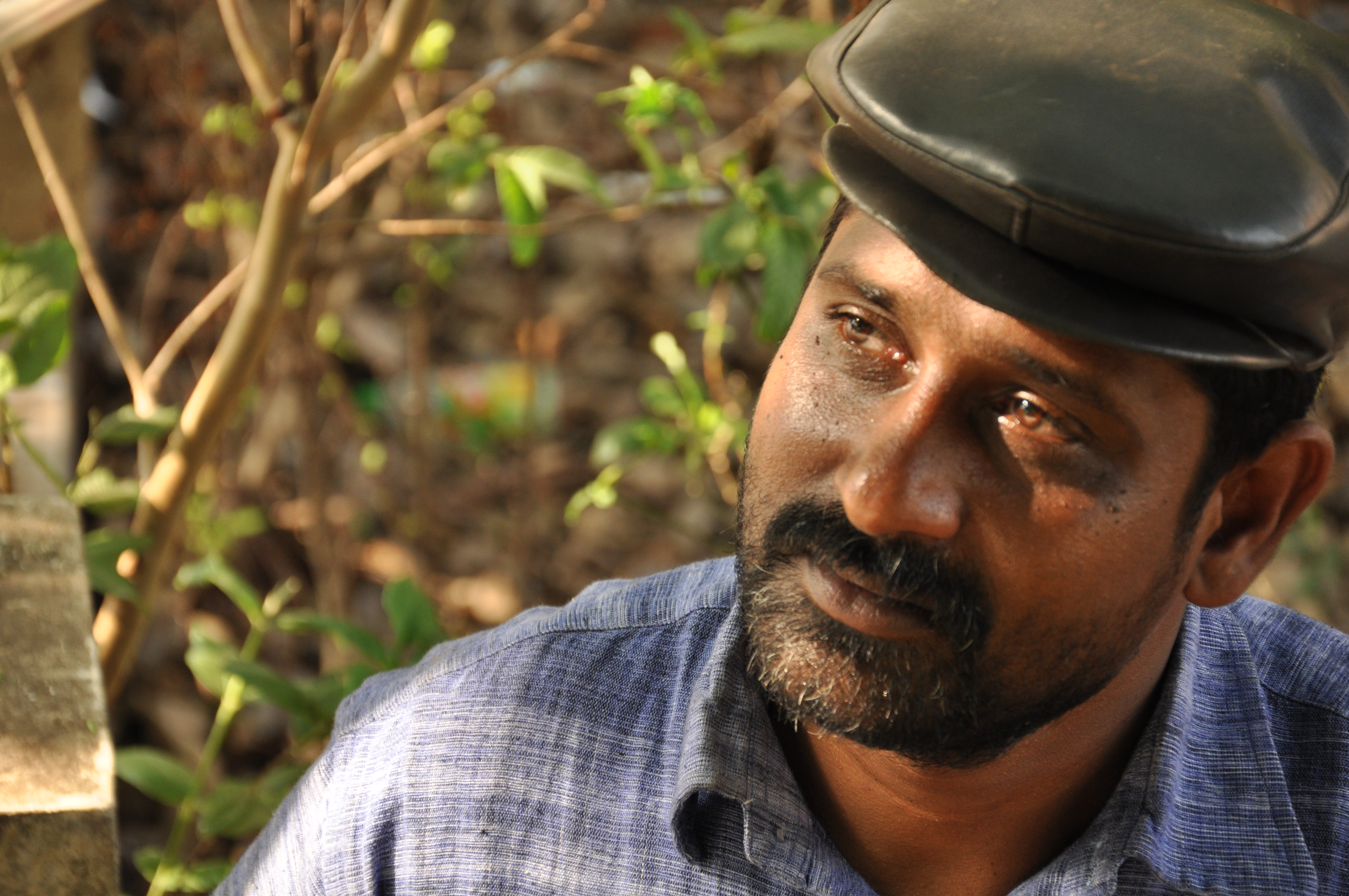
- Occupations: Director, lyricist, writer
- Years active: 2008–present
- Spouse: Rema K. P

Sathish Kalathil is an Indian film and documentary director and producer in Malayalam. His debut movie Jalachhayam (2010) was well discussed His first film was Veenavaadanam (2008), an experimental documentary about art (painting). He is also a story writer, poet, lyricist and journalist.

== Personal life ==
Sathish was born to K. P. Sankaran and K. M. Komalam in Thrissur district of Kerala, India. He is the editor at Prathibhavam online periodical and associate editor at Utthareeyam Magazine. He is also a political leader of Nationalist Congress Party with the post secretary of Nationalist Labour Congress, Kerala, a Labour wing of N.C.P and state working president of Kerala Vazhi Vanibha Sabha (H.M.S) union.

== Filmography ==
=== Direction ===
Year	Title	Writer	Script	Cinematography	Notes
2008	Veenavaadanam	Yes	Yes	Sunil.A.D	Documentary Film
2010	Jalachhayam	Sujith Aalungal	Sujith Aalungal	Pramod Vadakara	Feature Film
2012	Laloorinu Parayanullathu	Yes	Bhasi Pangil	Saju Pukikkottil, Sunil.A.D	Documentary Film
2022	Jnana Saradhi.	Yes	Bhasi Pangil	Navin Krishna	Documentary Film

== Lyrics ==
Sathish penned lyrics for his documentaries, Veenavaadanam and Jnana Saradhi. He has also written Ghazals for a musical documentary film, Arabikadalinte Ghazal Nilavu and Sithaye Suthanuve. He has experimented in song creation using Artificial intelligence and released an audio collection, Kannin Chirakiloru Mazhatthulli. He also released two video albums in the same year, Kadathanadan Thathamma and Pranayathinte neerazhiyil using various AI video generated websites. Sathish has published poems under the Pen Name 'Surya'.

Song	Film (Documentary)	Year	Singer	Composer
"Varakal Vaachaala Kadhakal"	Veenavaadanam	2008	Dr.B. Jayakrishnan	Baburaj Puthur
"Priyamullavane Nee Vida Chollave"	Jnana Saradhi	2022	Vineetha Joshi	Adv PK Sajeev, Vineetha Joshi
"Sithaye Suthanuve"	Arabikadalinte Ghazal Nilavu	2022	Sivadev Unnikumar	Adv. P.K Sajeev
"Kadatthanadan Kalariyile"	Kadathanadan Thathamma	2024	Suno AI	Suno AI

== Book ==
He wrote the book, 'Laloorinu Parayanullathu (What has Laloor To Say)' Published by Vidyaposhini Publications, Thrissur.

== Career ==
Sathish started the news magazine Prathibhavam in 2000., He established a trust in 2010, Digital Film Makers Forum (D.F.M.F.), to help amateur digital filmmakers make and promote digital films. The trust intervened against the termination of Sree Rama Varma Music School in 2013 and made many protests for the survival of the school.
