= Lakshmi (1979 film) =

- Title card
- Directed by: T. K. Mohan
- Written by: T. K. Mohan
- Produced by: S. V. Raju
- Starring: Sridevi; Jai Ganesh; Srikanth
- Cinematography: P. Rangan
- Edited by: D. S. Maniam
- Music by: Ilaiyaraaja
- Production company: Nageswari Films
- Release date: 2 March 1979
- Country: India
- Language: Tamil

Lakshmi is a 1979 Indian Tamil-language film written and directed by T. K. Mohan. The film stars Sridevi, Jai Ganesh and Srikanth. It was released on 2 March 1979.

== Cast ==
- Sridevi as Lakshmi
- Jai Ganesh
- Srikanth as Nagappan
- Suruli Rajan as Kannan
- Master Sridhar
- Jameela Malik
- Gandhimathi

== Soundtrack ==
The music was composed by Ilaiyaraaja. The song "Thennamarathile" was banned by All India Radio (AIR) due to its alleged suggestive lyrics; when its lyricist Gangai Amaran questioned M. S. Gopal, the then director of AIR Madras, Gopal responded that it was a committee decision. Amaran accused AIR of hypocrisy, noting that there were songs with more noticeably erotic lyrics such as "Chiththirame Solladi" from Vennira Aadai (1965) being aired.

Track listing
No.	Title	Lyrics	Singer(s)	Length
1.	"Velayee Veerayee"	Alangudi Somu	S. Janaki and chorus
2.	"Thennamarathile"	Gangai Amaran	P. Susheela, Ilaiyaraaja
3.	"Melamkotta Neram"	Alangudi Somu	B. S. Sasirekha
4.	"Panthayile Kalanthirukkira"	Alangudi Somu	Vani Jairam

== Release and reception ==
Lakshmi was released on 2 March 1979. P. S. M. of Kalki appreciated the music and said the film would appeal to those who are devoted to God.
