= Malabar Christian College =

Government college in Kozhikode, Kerala, India

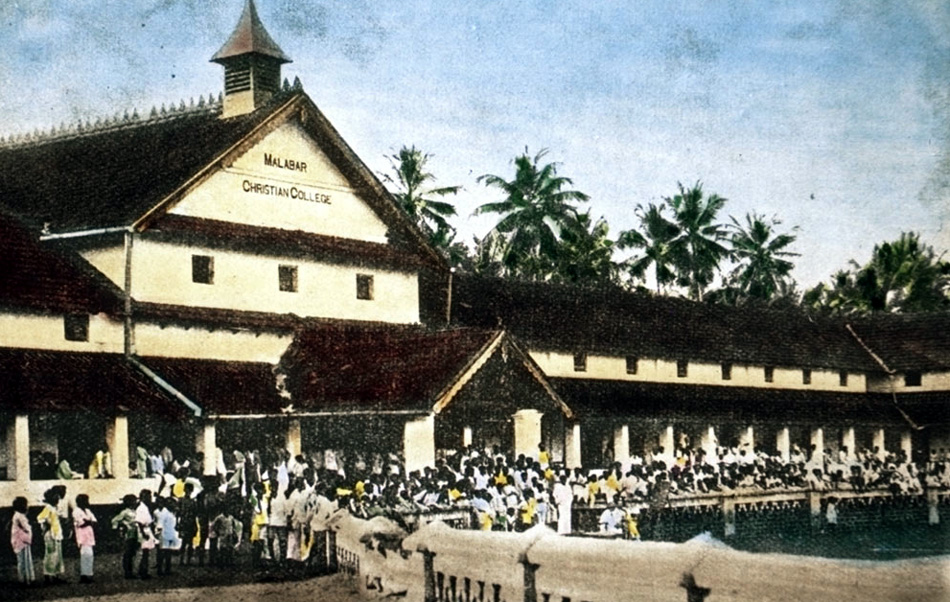
- Motto: Education without Discrimination
- Type: Government Aided
- Established: 1909; 117 years ago
- Affiliations: University of Calicut
- Chairman: Sneha B(2023-24)
- Principal: Dr.SACHIN P.JAMES
- Location: MCC Cross Rd, Kozhikode, Kerala, 673001, India; 11.2640651°N 75.7779202°E
- Campus: Urban
- Website: Malabar Christian College

The Malabar Christian College (MCC), established in 1909, is one of the oldest institutions located in Kozhikode, Kerala, India.

== History ==
It was established by Protestant Christian missionaries from Basel, Switzerland with the aim to impart education to the youth in Malabar region without discrimination. Initially, the college got affiliation of the University of Madras as a second-grade college and it was upgraded to a first-grade college in 1956.

== Academic programmes ==
The college offers undergraduates and postgraduate programmes in arts and science affiliated to the University of Calicut. It has been accredited by NAAC with an "A" Grade (CGPA 3.21 out of 4).

== Notable faculty and alumni ==
- Sahodaran Ayyappan
- Chintha Ravi
- P. V. Anvar
- K. K. Neelakantan
- Kutty
- Zacharias Aprem
- Anna Rajam Malhotra 1st women IAS officer
- Geetha Hiranyan
- Babu Bharadwaj
- Binu Pappu
- Chrysostom Arangaden
- Monisha Arshak
- K.K. Rema
- Rohan Kunnummal
- Attoor Ravi Varma
- V. P. Balagangadharan
- Moorkoth Ramunni
