= M. V. Devan =

Indian sculptor, (1928 – 2014)

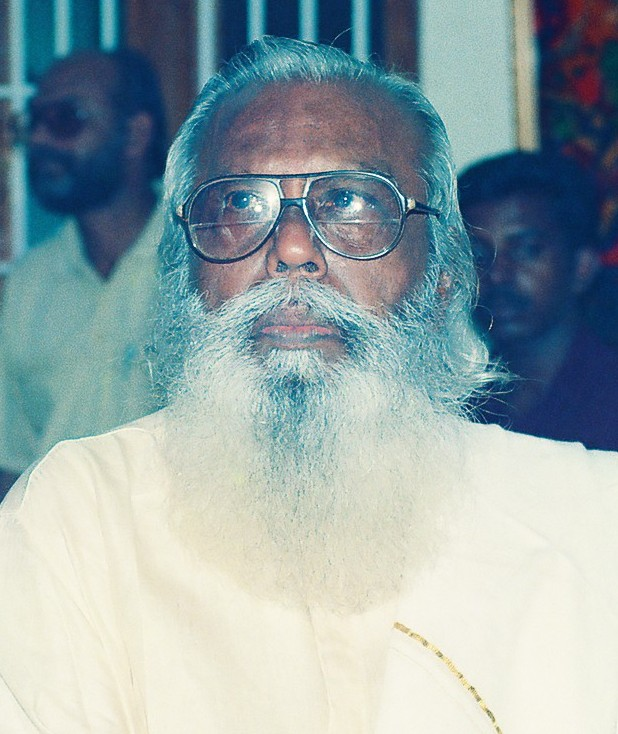
- Born: Madhathil Vasudevan; 15 January 1928; Panniyannur, Tellicherry, Malabar district, Madras Presidency, British India
- Died: 29 April 2014 (aged 86); Aluva, Ernakulam district, Kerala, India
- Occupations: Painter, sculptor, writer, art critic, orator
- Spouse: Sreedevi
- Children: Jameela M Devan, Shalini M Devan Grandchildren = Aparna P Kochumon, Ashwin P Kochumon, Sidharth Rajmohan
- Awards: 2000 Vayalar Award; 2002 Raja Ravi Varma Puraskaram; 2003 Mathrubhumi Literary Award; Kerala Lalithakala Akademi Fellowship; Chennai Lalitkala Akademi Fellowship; Malayattoor Award; Critics Award; M. K. K. Nair Award

Madathil Vasudevan, popularly identified as M. V. Devan (15 January 1928 – 29 April 2014), was an Indian painter, sculptor, writer, art critic and orator. Besides his artistic works, he was also known for his architectural designs for a number of cultural institutions as well as for his contributions in founding Kerala Kalapeetom, Kochi-based cultural organization, Malayala Kalagramam, an art village in New Mahe and Kalagramam, another art village in Kollam. A former chairman of the Kerala Lalithakala Akademi, he was a recipient of several honours including the Raja Ravi Varma Puraskaram of the Kerala Lalithakala Akademi, the Vayalar Award and the Mathrubhumi Literary Award.

== Biography ==
M. V. Devan was born on January 15, 1928, at Panniyannur, a small village in Thalassery in the south Indian state of Kerala. After completing high school in 1946, he left for Madras to study painting. At Chennai, he joined the Government College of Fine Arts, Chennai where he had the opportunity to study under D. P. Roy Choudhury and K. C. S. Paniker, the then principal and vice principal of the institution. It was during this time itself, he met M. Govindan, who influenced his thinking. Returning to Kerala, he was involved in many artistic, cultural and literary movements, besides his own artistic pursuits.

Devan was married to Sreedevi and the couple had two daughters, Jameela and Shalini. He died on April 29, 2014, at the age of 86, at his residence in Aluva, survived by his daughters; his wife had predeceased him.

== Career and legacy ==
On his return from Chennai in 1952, he joined Mathrubhumi daily at their Kozhikode office as a staff artist and stayed there until 1961 when he got an opportunity as an art consultant with Southern Languages Book Trust, Chennai. A year later, he quit the job when the Lalit Kala Akademi, Chennai was established to work as its founder secretary; during his tenure, the academy was a meeting point for the Chennai based artists and this was known to have served as an inspiration for the formation of Cholamandal Artists' Village, of which he was also a founder member. Later, he moved to the New Delhi office of the academy in 1996 for a two year stint and it was during this time he came in touch with M. K. K. Nair, the visionary civil servant, with whom he was involved in the organization of the All India Writers’ Conference in Aluva. Nair, who headed the Fertilizers and Chemicals Travancore Limited (FACT) during those days, invited Devan as an art consultant with Fact Engineering and Design Organisation (Fedo), a division of FACT and he worked for FACT till 1972, a year after Nair left the company to take up the position of a joint secretary at the Planning Commission of India.

In 1977, Devan was selected as the chairman of the Kerala Lalithakala Akademi, a post he held till 1977. Simultaneously, he ran an architectural design firm, Perunthachan, where he practised environment-friendly cost-effective construction techniques, a pioneering effort much before Laurie Baker popularised the concept in the state; he designed around 450 constructions, which include auditoria, hotels and church. After his tenure with Kerala Lalithakala Akademi ended in 1977, he continued his involvement with the fine arts, literature and cultural activities; the founding of Nadaka Kalari, a theatre group based in Vaikom, in 1967, along with M. Govindan, C. N. Sreekantan Nair, K. S. Narayana Pillai, K. Ayyappa Paniker and G. Sankara Pillai, was one among them.

Devan founded Kerala Kalapeedom, art and cultural centre based in Kochi, in 1978, where several artists such as T. Kaladharan, M. R. D. Dattan, C. N. Karunakaran and Artist Namboothiri; he would also chair the organization later. He was also involved in the founding of two art villages, Malayala Kalagramam, in New Mahe and Kalagramam, in Kollam. Navashakti, Gopuram, Sameeksha, Kerala Kavita and Jwala were some of the literary publications he was associated with. Devan compiled the articles he had published earlier, as an essay anthology, under the title, Devaspandanam, in 2001.

Devan's paintings and sculptures have been exhibited in many paces in India. T. Kaladharan, one of his proteges, has cataloged his drawings, paintings, graphic paints, and sculptures which has since been published by the Kerala Lalithakala Akademi, under the title, Remembering M. V. Devan.

In 2019, the family members of Devan, primarily his daughters and grandchildren, as a commemoration of Devan’s art and legacy, initiated the ‘M V Devan Puraskaram’ - an award in Devan’s name. It was envisaged to render recognition to exemplary icons in the field of visual arts. The primary M V Devan Puraskaram was presented to artist NKP Muthukoya on 29 April 2019, the death anniversary of Devan

== Awards and honours ==
Devaspandanam, which is considered by many the magnum opus of Devan, was selected for two awards, starting with the Vayalar Award in 2000, followed by the Mathrubhumi Literary Award in 2003. The book would also receive Malayattoor Award later. In between, he received the Raja Ravi Varma Puraskaram of the Kerala Lalithakala Akademi in 2002. He also received the fellowship of the academy as well as the fellowship of the Chennai Lalit Kala Akademi. The other honours received by Devan include the Critics Award and the M. K. K. Nair Award. On the occasion of his first death anniversary, an event was organized in Kochi, Remembering Devan, which featured several lectures and an exhibition of Devan's paintings as well as the works of some of his contemporaries including Tyeb Mehta, F. N. Souza, K. K. Hebbar, Laxma Goud, Bhupen Khakhar and Akbar Padamsee. Binuraj Kalapeedam, one of his students at Kerala Kalapeedam, has made a documentary on the life of Devan, titled Devaspandanam, the title of his award-winning book.
