= Ore Thooval Pakshikal =

Ore Thooval Pakshikal (Birds of the Same Feather)
- Directed by: Chintha Ravi
- Written by: Chintha Ravi
- Produced by: Chintha Ravi
- Starring: Balan K. Nair; Tom Alter; Nilambur Balan; Mokeri Ramachandran; Nedumudi Venu; Cuckoo Parameswaran
- Cinematography: Sunny Joseph
- Edited by: P. Raman Nair
- Music by: Background score: G. Aravindan; Songs: M. B. Sreenivasan
- Production company: Vichara Chalachithra
- Release date: 1988
- Country: India
- Language: Malayalam

Ore Thooval Pakshikal (English: Birds of the Same Feather) is a 1988 Malayalam film written, directed and produced by Chintha Ravi. The film, in a docu-drama style, depicts the last days of the British Raj. It stars Balan K. Nair, Tom Alter, Nilambur Balan and Ramachandran Mokeri in pivotal roles. The film features an original score composed by legendary filmmaker G. Aravindan.

== Awards ==
Kerala State Film Awards

- Best Film- Chintha Ravi
- Second Best Actress- Cuckoo Parameswaran
- Best Music Director- G. Aravindan
