= Prathibhavam =

Defunct Indian newspaper

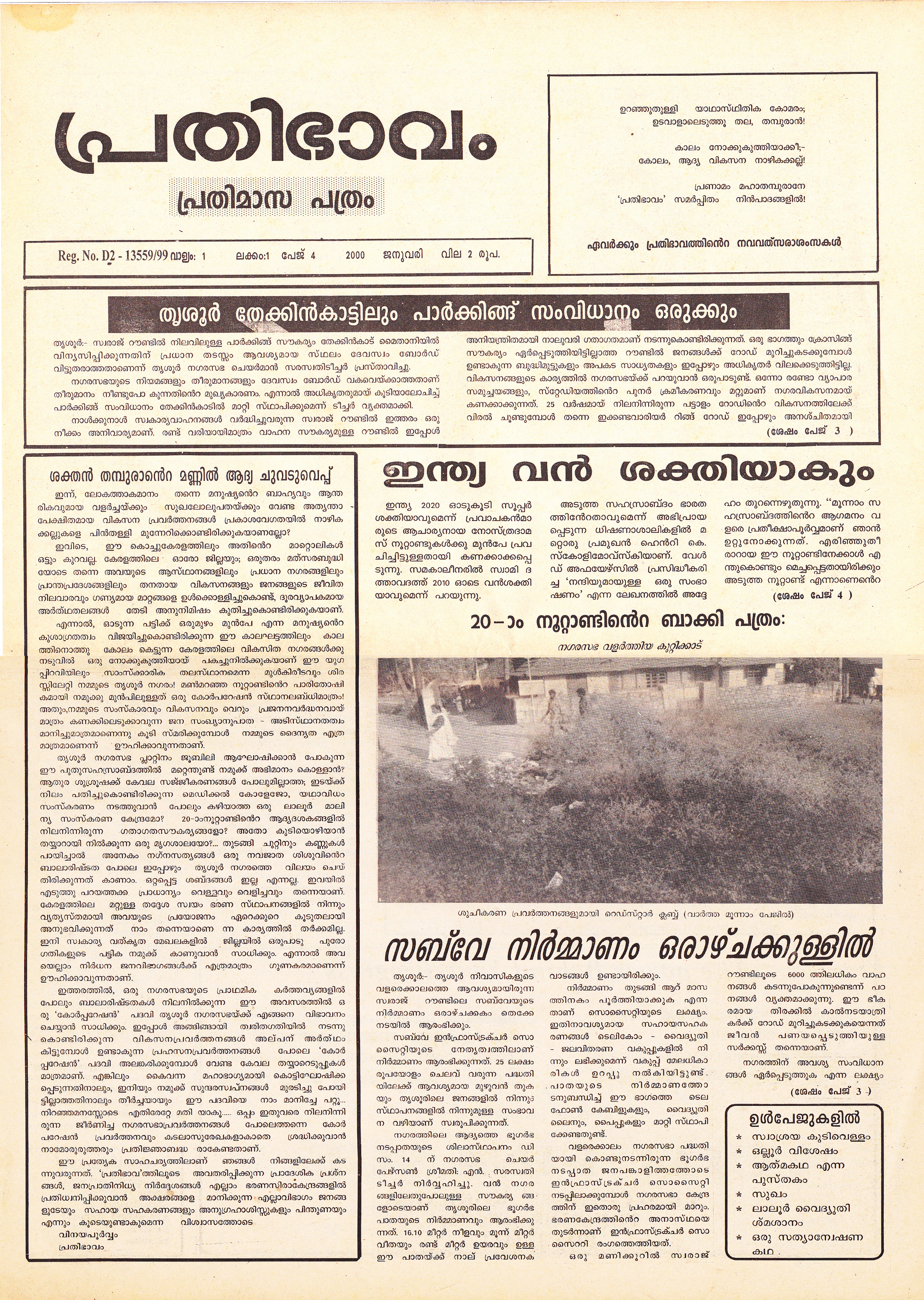
- Type: Newspaper: originally broadsheet, online only from 1 January 2025
- Format: Website
- Owner: Sathish Kalathil
- Publisher: Sathish Kalathil
- Editor-in-chief: Sathish Kalathil
- Founded: 1 January 2000; 26 years ago
- Language: Malayalam
- Headquarters: Thrissur, Kerala, India
- Website: prathibhavam.com

Prathibhavam is a Malayalam language Indian Online periodical for bilingual literature and news with defunct print editions. It was formerly a monthly newspaper that was established in January 2000 from Thrissur city, Kerala, India and the poem, Sukham, the last work of Geetha Hiranyan, the famous writer of Kerala was published in the first edition of the paper. After 25 years back, it was relaunched as e-newspaper on 1 January 2025. Sathish Kalathil is the owner and editor of the newspaper.

== History ==
Prathibhavam started as a monthly booklet on the rural issues of Thrissur Municipality. It was established by the Red Star Club, located in Thrissur city, on 8 September 1999. The publication was discontinued by the club and was taken over by Sathish Kalathil, one of the founders and the editor of the booklet. On 5 January 2000, Prathibhavam was registered with the Registrar of Newspapers for India.

== Popular column ==
Vocal circus
