= Vasanthathile Poomarangal =

2013 Malayalam novel by Praveen

Vasanthathile Poomarangal Maoist
- First edition (Green Books)
- Author: Roopesh
- Language: Malayalam
- Genre: Novel
- Published: 2013
- Publisher: Green Books, D. C. Books
- Publication place: India
- Media type: Print (Papercover)
- Pages: 166
- ISBN: 9788126440993

Vasanthathile Poomarangal (Flowering Trees of Spring; 2013), also published as Maoist, is a Malayalam novel written by Praveen under nom de guerre Roopesh. The novel is based on the report stating the presence of Maoists in Kerala. It narrates the activities of politicians and the interference of Police in this issue. It is authored by Roopesh, a political activist who is described as a Maoist.

The book was brought out by the two leading publishing companies in two different names. Kottayam-based DC Books has named the novel as Maoist while the title of the novel published by Thrissur-based Green Books is Vasanthathile Poomarangal.
