= Geetha Hiranyan =

Indian writer

- Born: Geetha Potti; 20 March 1956; Kottavattom, Kottarakkara, Kollam district, Kerala, India
- Died: 2 January 2002 (aged 45); Thrissur, Kerala, India
- Occupations: Writer, author
- Spouse: K. K. Hiranyan
- Children: Uma and Anand
- Relatives: Sreedharan Potti (father); Vasumathy Devi (mother)
- Writing career
- Notable works: Ottasnappil Othukkanavilla Janmasathyam; Asangaditha; Iniyum Veedaatha Hridayathinte Kadam
- Notable awards: 1994 Kunju Pilla Smaraka Award; 2001 G. Sankara Kurup Janmasathabdhi Kavitha Award; 2001 T. P. Kishor Award; 2001 Ankanam Award

Geetha Hiranyan (20 March 1956 – 2 January 2002) was an Indian writer of Malayalam literature. Known for her short stories, compiled in three books, Ottasnappil Othukkanavilla Janmasathyam, Asangaditha and Iniyum Veedatha Hrudayathinte Kadam, she was a recipient of a number of honours including G. Sankara Kurup Janmasathabdhi Kavitha Award and Kunju Pilla Smaraka Award.

== Biography ==
Geetha Hiranyan, née Geetha Potti, was born on 20 March 1956 at Kottavattom, near Kottarakara in Kollam district of the south Indian state of Kerala to Thottavttath C. Sreedharan Potti and Vasumathy Devi; she was related to the noted writer and social reformer, Lalithambika Antharjanam. After earning master's and MPhil degrees, she started her career as a lecturer at Malabar Christian College, simultaneously continuing her doctoral studies. Later she taught at various government colleges in Malappuram, Kalpetta, Perinthalmanna, Thrissur, Pattambi and Kodungalloor before joining Kerala Sahitya Akademi as the publications officer on deputation. It was at this time, she became ill due to which she could not continue her service.

Geetha was married to K. K. Hiranyan, a writer, critic and an academic, and the couple had a daughter, Uma and a son Ananthakrishnan. She died due to cancer on 2 January 2002, aged 43, at her home in Thrissur and her dead body was cremated at Ullannoor Mana, her ancestral house. She is survived by her daughter Uma and son Ananthakrishnan. Her husband, who outlived her for 22 years, died on 17 July 2024, aged 70.

== Legacy and honours ==
Geetha participated in a literary competition organized by Mathrubhumi for their Vishu edition in 1979 and her story, Deerghapankan, was selected for the consolation prize. Two decades later, in 1999, she published her first short story anthology, Ottasnappil Othukkanavilla Janmasathyam (It is not Possible to Frame Life's Truth in a Single Shot). Her next two anthologies, Iniyum Veedaattha Hridayathinte Kadam and Asangaditha were published in 2002, shortly after her death. Her last story, Shilpa is Writing a Story, was included in Asangaditha. In 2008, a complete collection was published under the title, Geetha Hiranyante Kathakal (The Stories Of Geetha Hiranyan). Her story was also included in the book, Daughters of Kerala : twenty-five short stories by award-winning authors, which contains the English translations of stories by women writers of Kerala.

Geetha received the Kunju Pilla Smaraka Puraskaram in 1994. She received three awards in 2001, the Ankanam Award, G. Sankara Kurup Centenary Award for Poetry and T. P. Kishore Award. Kerala Sahitya Akademi has instituted an annual award, Geetha Hiranyan Endowment Award, in her honour, for writers below the age of 35, to recognize excellence in Malayalam literature. Kerala Bhasha Institute has published her biography, under the title, Geetha Hiranyan:Jeeva Charithram, written by Sheeba Divakaran.

== Bibliography ==
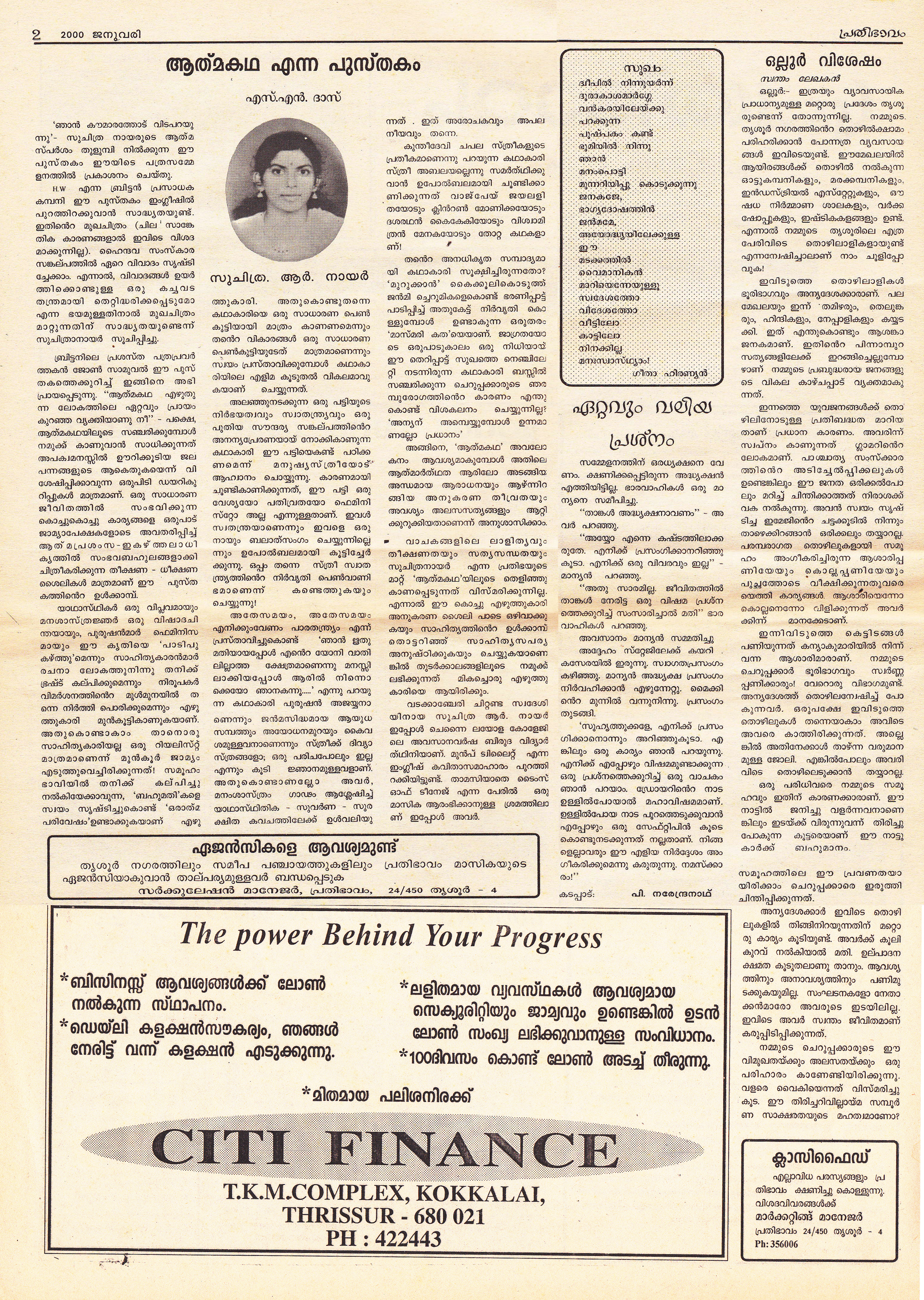
Sukham, the poem of Geetha Hiranyan in Prathibhavam newspaper.

=== Stories ===
- Geetha Hiranyan (1999). Otta Snapil Othukkanavilla Oru Janmasathyam. Current Books, Thrissur: Current Books.
- Geetha Hiranyan (2002). Asankhatitha. Current Books, Thrissur: Current Books.
- Geetha Hiranyan (2002). Iniyum Veedatha Hridayathinte Kadam. Kottayam: DC Books. ISBN 8126404485. OCLC 51086224.
- Geetha Hiranyan (2008). Geetha Hiranyante kadhakal. Thrissur: Current Books.

=== Poems ===
- Sukham (Prathibhavam-2000)

== See also ==
- List of Malayalam-language authors by category
- List of Malayalam-language authors
