= Unnikuttanu Joli Kitti =

- Directed by: V. R. Gopinath
- Written by: V. R. Gopinath
- Starring: Narendra Prasad; Murali; Jose Thomas; Krishnankutty Nair; K. P. Kumaran; P. A. Backer; Thara
- Cinematography: Sunny Joseph
- Edited by: P. Raman Nair
- Music by: Mohan Sithara
- Production company: Prasad Arts
- Release date: 1989
- Country: India
- Language: Malayalam

Unnikuttanu Joli Kitti is a 1989 Malayalam film written and directed by V. R. Gopinath. It tells the story of an unemployed youth becoming unemployable due to callous social attitudes. It won the National Film Award for Best Film on Other Social Issues.

== Cast ==
- Murali
- Jose Thomas
- KP Kumaran
- PA Bakker
- Krishnankutty Nair
- Baby Drisya G Nath
- Jameela Malik
- Narendra Prasad
- Thara
