= Prakriti Manohari =

- Directed by: GS Panicker
- Written by: G S Panicker
- Screenplay by: G S Panicker
- Starring: Jagannatha Varma; Lisha; Sujath
- Cinematography: Divakara Menon
- Edited by: Suresh Babu
- Music by: M. B. Sreenivasan
- Production company: Niyo Films
- Distributed by: Niyo Films
- Release date: 7 August 1980
- Country: India
- Language: Malayalam

Prakriti Manohari is a 1980 Indian Malayalam film, written and directed by GS Panicker. The film stars Jagannatha Varma, Lisha and Sujath in lead roles.

== Cast ==
- Jagannatha Varma
- Lisha
- Sujath
