= Ramachandran Mokeri =

Indian theatre director (c.1947–2022)

Ramachandran Mokeri (c. 1947 – 4 September 2022) was a theater person based in Kerala. He especially focused on revolutionary social theater practice in Kerala.

== Life ==
He was a theater activist, actor, director, writer and scholar from north Kerala, South India. Mokeri worked as director at School of Drama and Fine Arts which is University of Calicut's campus. The school located in Aranattukara, a suburb of Thrissur city this department of the university provides formal education and training in drama and theatre. The school is affiliated with National School of Drama.[3]

He collaborated with Malayalam film directors such as Chintha Ravi.

He is acted as the main Character Professor Isac in the Malayalam movie Heart of Dog directed by Sreekrishnan K P.
