= Iniyum Marichittillatha Nammal =

- Directed by: Chintha Ravi
- Written by: Chintha Ravi
- Screenplay by: Chintha Ravi
- Produced by: Babu Bharadwaj
- Starring: Sashi Kumar; T. V. Chandran; Kadammanitta Ramakrishnan; Vijayalakshmi
- Cinematography: R. M. Kasthoori (Moorthy)
- Edited by: P. Raman Nair
- Production company: Vichara Chalachithra
- Distributed by: Vichara Chalachithra
- Release date: 28 March 1980
- Country: India
- Language: Malayalam

Iniyum Marichittillatha Nammal is a 1980 Indian Malayalam film, directed by Chintha Ravi. The film stars Sashi Kumar, T. V. Chandran, Kadammanitta Ramakrishnan and Vijayalakshmi in the lead roles.

== Cast ==
- Sashi Kumar
- T. V. Chandran
- Kadammanitta Ramakrishnan
- Vijayalakshmi
