= Children's Museum, Siri Fort =

Museum for Children in India

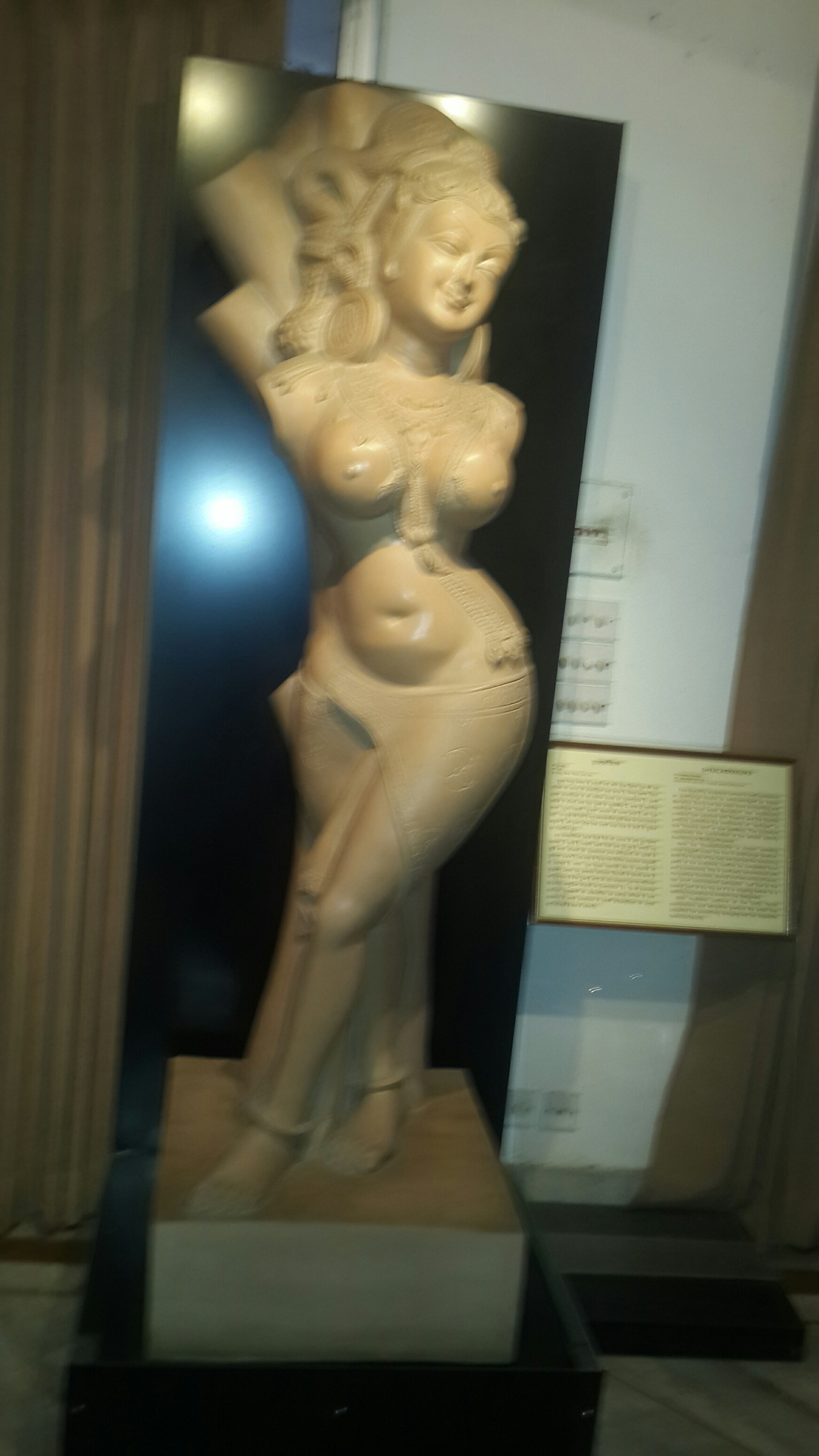
- A replica of Shalabhanjika from the Pratihara period of 9–10th century from Madhya Pradesh, in the posture of dvibhanga, known as "Indian Monalisa"

- Location within Delhi
- Established: 2011
- Location: Siri Fort, New Delhi, India
- Coordinates: 28.5518964°N 77.2163258°E
- Collection size: 30 replicas

The Children's Museum, Siri Fort, established by the Archaeological Survey of India (ASI) is a museum specifically created to educate children on the cultural, archaeological and historical heritage of India through replicated sculptures created from the existing well known sculptures in various museums and heritage sites in the country. The museum houses 30 such sculptures created by students of the College of Arts and Crafts, Patna, under the direction of K. K. Mohammed, an archaeologist who had formerly worked as Superintendent Archaeologist of ASI's Delhi circle. The museum is located in a lane adjoining the Siri Fort Auditorium and Siri Fort sports complex in South Delhi, New Delhi. A unique life-size sculpture created and exhibited in the museum is of Mughal Emperor Akbar which is not found anywhere else in the country. There are also statues of Emperor Ashoka, and Shah Jahan; these three statues were added when the museum was opened for public viewing in May 2011 and are located in the garden surrounding the museum.

== History ==
The plan to create this museum was first initiated by the ASI by acquiring a building which was under the control of the Delhi Development Authority Officer's Club. The ASI acquired it in 2003 after a case filed in the court by Ajeet Cour, writer and V. P. Singh, late former Prime Minister of India. The conceptual plans prepared in 2008 for creating the museum to house 100 exact reproduction of sculptures from India and another 100 from the heritage sites in the Asian region, is attributed to the National Museum and K.K.Muhammed who was then the Superintending Archaeologist of the Delhi Circle of ASI. The purpose was to show case at one place replicated sculptures from different places and of different historical periods. As the funds allotted for this project was limited, only 30 replica sculptures could be made and displayed in the museum.

The sculptures were replicated by the students of the College of Arts and Crafts, Patna only from photographs of the original sculptures, as none of them had seen them at their original locations.

== Exhibits ==
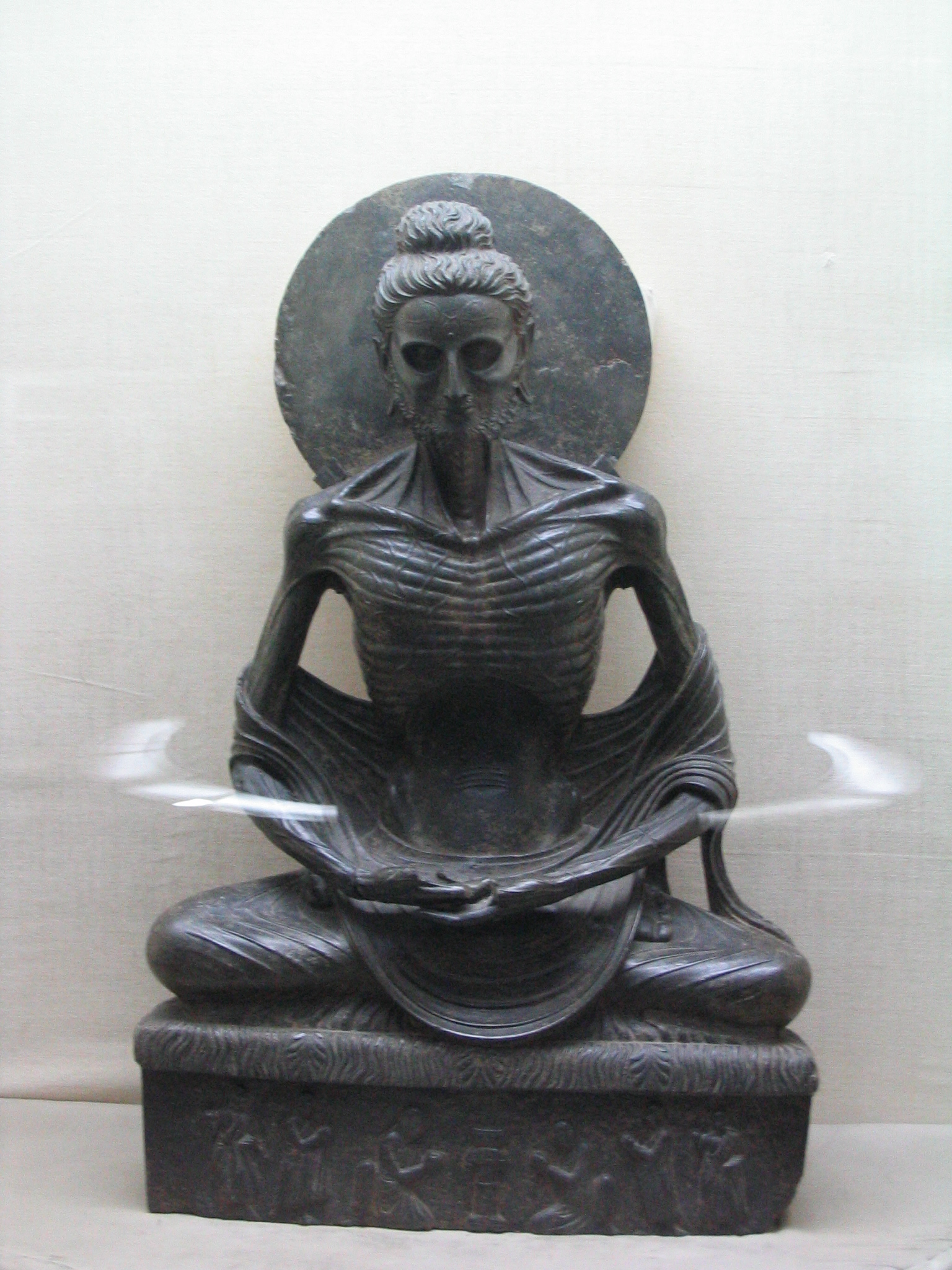
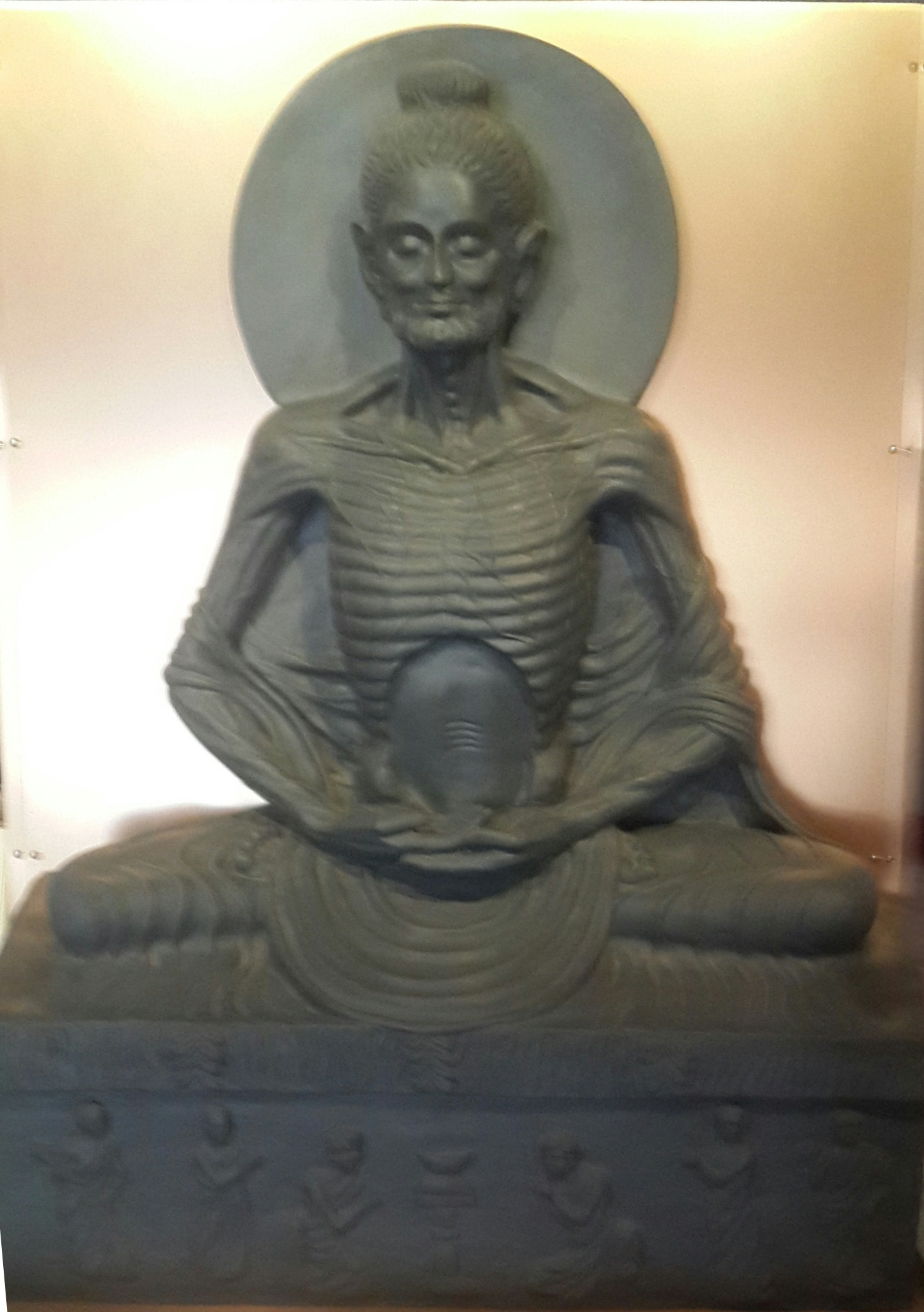
Left:Fasting Buddha in Lahore Museum in Pakistan, Right:Replica of fasting Buddha displayed at the Children Museum, Siri Fort, New Delhi

Some of the important original sculptures of different periods in history replicated and displayed in the museum are of: Arjuna's Penance (sculpture of the 7th century) at Mahabalipuram a part of the UNESCO World Heritage Site of the Group of Monuments at Mahabalipuram; Ugra Narasimha at Hampi of the Vijayanagara era temples; Gomteshwara (Jain Tirthankara) of 983 AD by the Ganga dynasty; Jesus Christ on the Cross of sixteenth century from Goa; Gudimallam Shivalinga from the first century BC from Chittoor in Andhra Pradesh; "Ravana Shaking Kailash" from the 5th century Dashavatara caves from Ellora; Trimurti from the Elephanta Caves of the Chalukyan rock-cut architecture; Rudra Shiva seventh century AD from Tala, in Chhattisgarh; Gyaraspur Yakshi from Madhya Pradesh of the Mauryan period; Shalabhanjika from the Pratihara period of 9–10th century from Madhya Pradesh, which is a voluptuous image of a woman without hands sculpted from buff sandstone in the posture of dvibhanga, known as "Indian Monalisa"; a Gandhara art form of fasting Buddha in a skeletal form from the Kushan period of 3rd Century AD (the original sculpture is in Lahore Museum in Pakistan); Preaching Buddha of thirteenth century from Sarnath of the Gandhara School of Art, Didarganj Yakshini from Bihar which unearthed in 1917 from the bank of Ganga River in 1917 and presently exhibited at Patna Museum, a drunken woman from Mathura. These sculptures represent many schools of art and architecture that existed in the past. The sculptures on display are made from fibreglass. There is also a gallery where photographs of the original monuments, before and after renovations done by ASI, are displayed. The artists who created the replicas have made improvements on the original sculptures such as in the case of Deedarganj Yakshni in the Patna Museum. The original sculpture had its nose and a hand damaged which was rectified in the replica. In the same manner, a replica of the Ashoka pillar at Sarnath is now made with the "wheel with four lions seated back to back", while the original does not have this feature.

There are plans to make and exhibit replicas of art works from China, Japan, Korea, Thailand, Cambodia, Malaysia, Burma and Sri Lanka for display at the museum.
