= Uthrada Rathri =

- Directed by: Balachandra Menon
- Written by: Balachandra Menon
- Screenplay by: Balachandra Menon
- Produced by: L. Rajalekshmi Kunjamma
- Starring: Madhu; Shobha; Sukumaran; Nangasserry Sasi
- Cinematography: Hemachandran
- Edited by: P. Raman Nair
- Music by: Jaya Vijaya; Lyrics: Bichu Thirumala
- Production company: Nangasserry Films
- Distributed by: Nangasserry Films
- Release date: 21 July 1978
- Country: India
- Language: Malayalam

Uthrada Rathri is a 1978 Indian Malayalam film, directed by Balachandra Menon in his directorial debut, produced by L. Rajalekshmi Kunjamma, and starring Madhu, Shobha, Sukumaran and Nangasserry Sasi. The film has musical score by Jaya Vijaya. The movie deals with the subject Hypochondriasis, a condition in which a person is excessively and unduly worried about having a serious illness, which is very rarely discussed seriously in movies. The film won Menon the Kerala state award for best screenplay. It is a lost film.

== Cast ==
- Madhu
- Shobha
- Sukumaran
- Nangasserry Sasi
- Kaviyoor Ponnamma
- Sankaradi
- Adoor Bhavani
- Aranmula Ponnamma
- Kanakadurga
- Kuthiravattam Pappu
- Mallika Sukumaran
- Ravi Menon

== Soundtrack ==
The music was composed by Jaya Vijaya.

No.	Song	Singers	Lyrics	Length (m:ss)
1	"Bhramanapadham Vazhi"	K. J. Yesudas	Bichu Thirumala	
2	"Manju Pozhiyunnu"	Vani Jairam	Bichu Thirumala	
