= Kalamandalam Kshemavathy =

Indian Mohiniyattam dancer

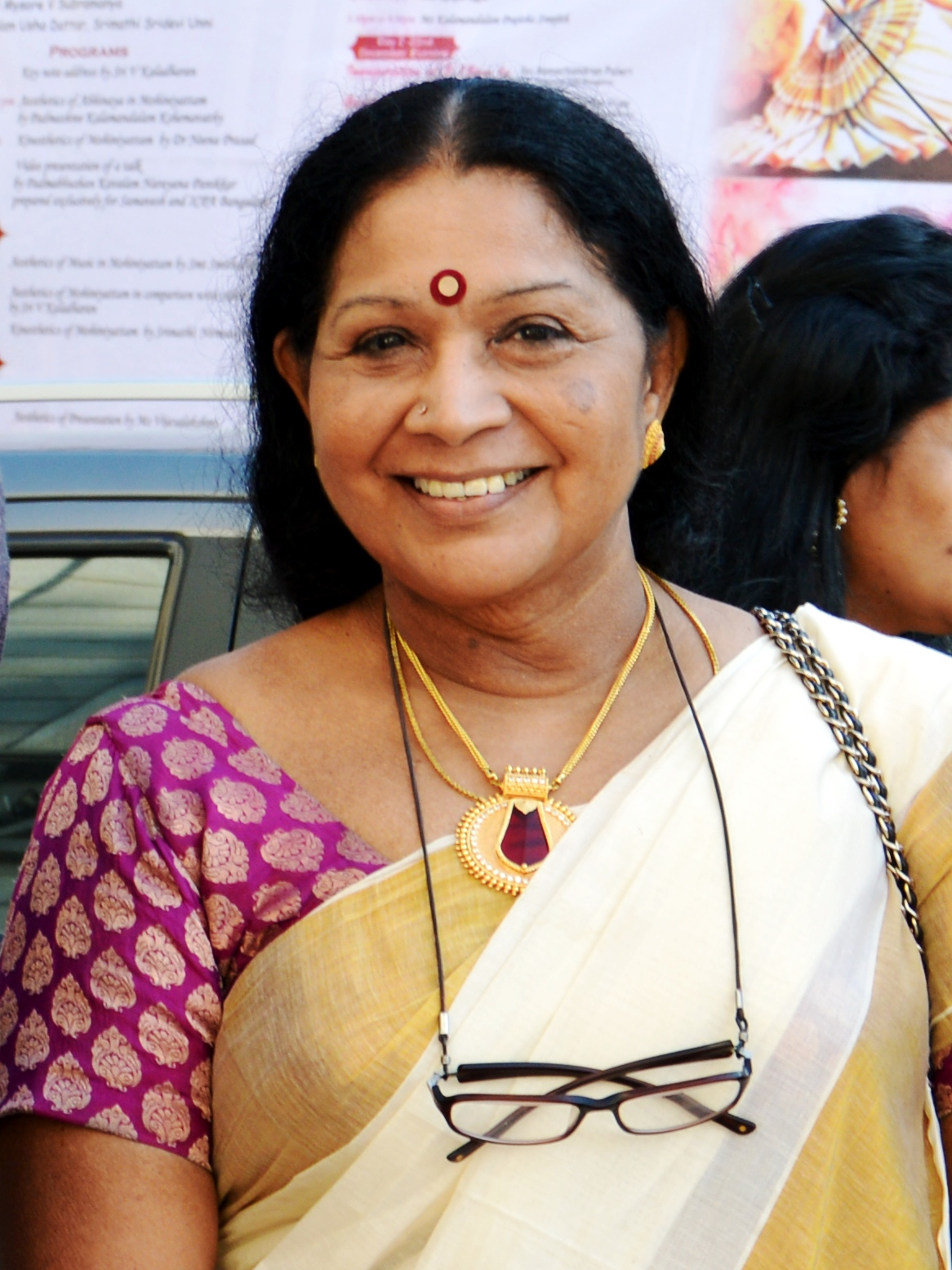
- Kalamandalam Kshemavathy
- Born: 1948 (age 77–78)
- Occupations: Danseuse, Actress
- Website: www.kshemavathy.com

Kalamandalam Kshemavathy (born 1948) is a Mohiniyattam dancer from Thrissur, Kerala, India. She is an alumna of the Kerala Kalamandalam. She joined the institute when she was ten. After completion of the course, she undertook advanced training in Bharata Natyam under Muthuswamy Pillai and Chitra Visweswaran, and in Kuchipudi under Vempati Chinna Satyam, but chose to remain within the Mohiniyattam tradition.

== Credentials ==
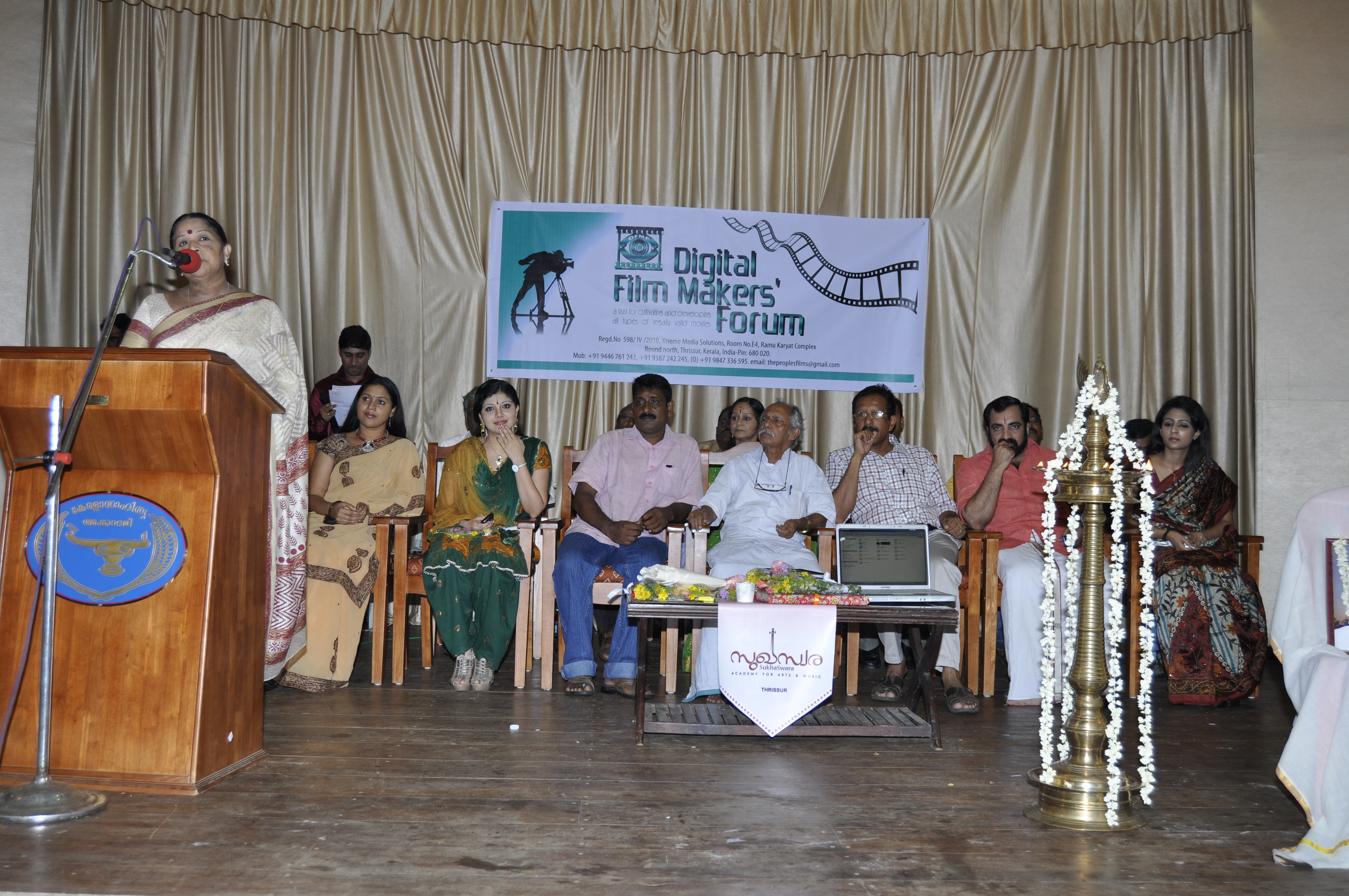
Kshemavathy inaugurating Digital Film Makers Forum Trust

She was awarded the Padma Shri in 2011 for her contributions to Mohinyattam. She has also received the Sangeet Natak Akademi Award, She received the Kerala Sangeetha Nataka Akademi Award in 1975 (for Bharatanatyam) and the Kerala Sangeetha Nataka Akademi Fellowship in 2015.

Kshemavathy is known for her abhinaya and traditionalist approach to the art form. She encourages research and believes that experimentation is inevitable, but must be explored leaving the basics of the art form untarnished. Her dance school has attracted students from Germany, France, Sweden and Finland in the past.

She has given a visual representation for about 100 poems, including those of cherrusseri and sugathakumari, "kuchelavrittam", classics like chinthavishtayaya seetha, leela etc., and even ghazals. She is a teacher with a large number of students.

== Personal life ==
Kshemavathy was the wife of V. K. Pavithran. She has two daughters, Eva Pavithran and Lakshmi Pavithran.

== Filmography ==
=== As actress ===
Year	Film
1972	Panimudakku
1973	Eanippadikal
1975	Niramaala
1978	Ahalya
1978	Paadasaram
1978	Samayamaayilla Polum
1980	Makara Vilakku

=== As Choreographer ===
Year	Film
1968	Karutha Pournami
1976	Njavalppazhangal
1977	Yudhakaandam
2014	Swapaanam
