= B. D. Dethan =

Indian painter

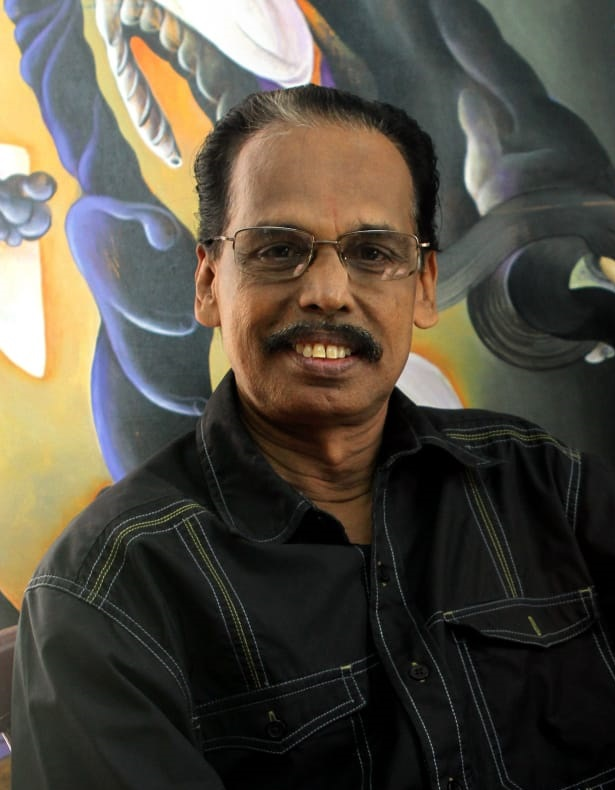
- B. D. Dethan
- Born: 1946 (age 79–80); Thiruvananthapuram, India
- Known for: Painting
- Spouse: Vasantha
- Children: Vidhu Deth, Veenadathen
- Parents: B. Bhaskaran (father); Bharathy (mother)

B. D. Dethan is an Indian painter from the state of Kerala. A recipient of several awards and Kerala Lalithakala Akademi Fellowship 2007, he was a member of the executive committee of Kerala Lalithakala Akademi thrice. His paintings are featured in several private and public collections in India and abroad including, the National Gallery of Modern Art, New Delhi; Parliament House, New Delhi; Lalit Kala Akademi, New Delhi and Lok Bhavan, Thiruvananthapuram. The Government of Kerala awarded him Raja Ravi Varma Puraskaram for his achievements in the field of visual arts in 2019.

== Biography ==
B. D. Dethan was born in 1946, at Thiruvanathapuram. He received formal training and secured a diploma in painting from the School of Arts, Thiruvananthapuram. Later, he participated in an orientation course conducted at the Balabhavan and Children's Museum, New Delhi during 1971–72. He worked as the Art Editor at State Institute of Encyclopedic Publications, Government of Kerala, Thiruvananthapuram from 1977 to 2001. Dethan also served as the Honorary Art Instructor at Jawahar Balabhavan, Thiruvananthapuram from 1971 to 83.

== Career ==
B. D. Dethan has held more than 20 solo exhibitions of his paintings and was part of nine group art shows held across India. He held solo exhibitions of his paintings at Thiruvananthapuram several times from 1972 to 2011 and at Ernakulam in 2006 and 2008. He has participated in group exhibitions held at several locations in India, Kuwait, Thailand, Malaysia and has taken part in Rashtriya Kala Mela held at Bangalore.

== Major works ==
- Kali
- Botanical Fantasies
- Nude Complexion - two
- Avastha
- Parinamam Noottiyonnu
- Sangharsham
- Mukhangal

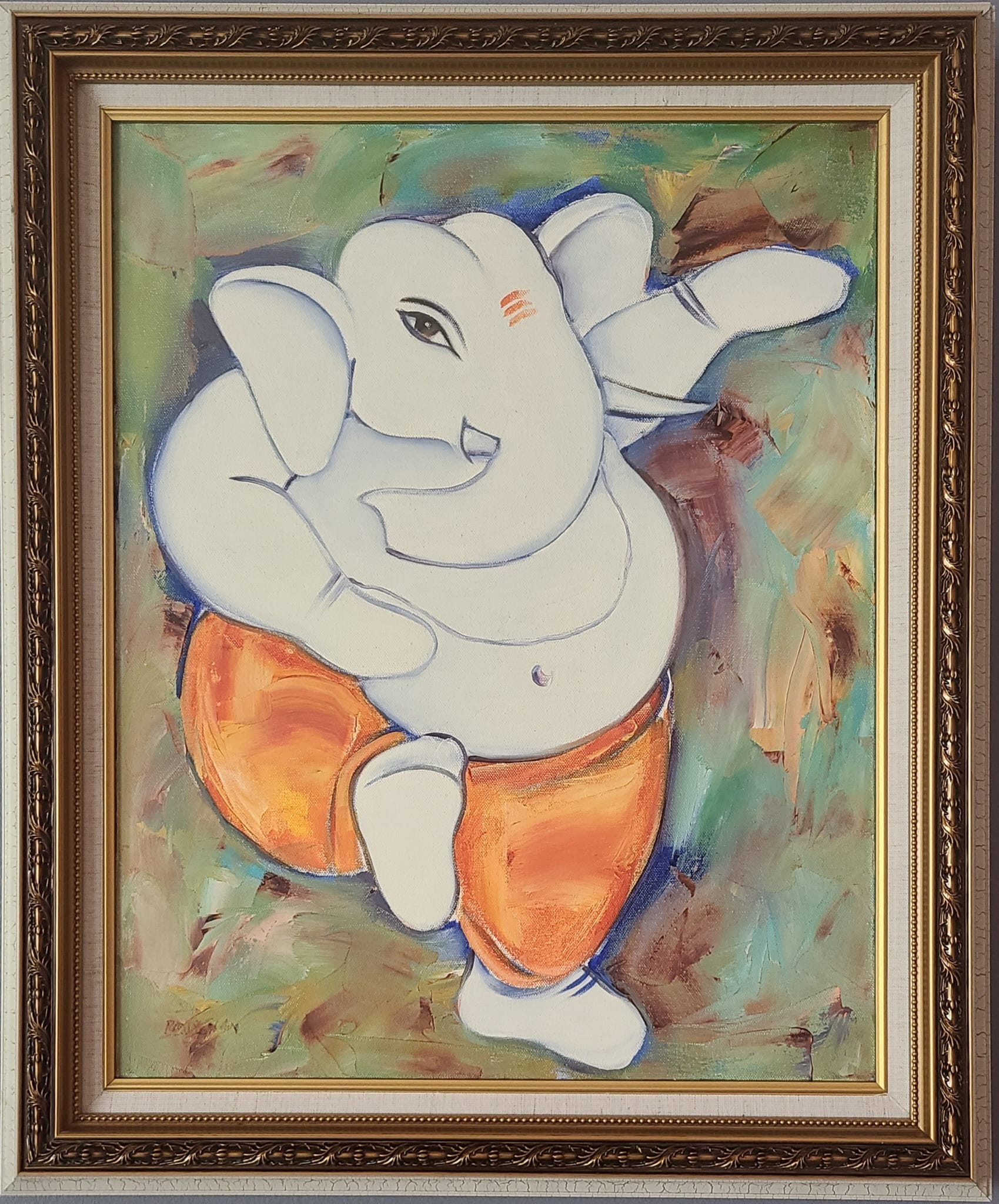

== Collections ==
- National Gallery of Modern Art, New Delhi Parliament House, New Delhi
- Kendra Lalit Kala Akademi, New Delhi
- Kerala Lalithakala Akademi, Ernakulam
- Sree Chithra Art Gallery, Thiruvananthapuram
- Raj Bhavan, Shillong
- Several private collections in India, and around the world.

== Awards ==
- Raja Ravi Varma Puraskaram - 2019
- Kerala Lalithakala Akademi Award - 1969, 1970, 1972, 1973, 1974, 1975 and 1984.
- Gandhi Lenin Centenary Celebrations Award - 1970.
- Gandhi Smaraka Nidhi Award - 1970
