= Anila Jacob =

Indian sculptor

- Born: c. 1941; Kottayam, Kingdom of Travancore, British India (present-day Kerala, India)
- Education: Government College of Fine Arts, Chennai (Diploma in Fine Arts, 1964)
- Known for: Sculpture
- Movement: Madras Art Movement
- Awards: National Award, Lalit Kala Akademi (1965); Madras State Lalit Kala Akademi Award (1968); Karnataka Chitra Kala Parishath Award (1976); Padmini Puraskaram, Kerala Lalithakala Akademi (2011); Raja Ravi Varma Puraskaram, Kerala Lalithakala Akademi (2018)

Anila Jacob (née Thomas, born c. 1941) is an Indian sculptor associated with the Madras Art Movement and Cholamandal Artists' Village.

== Early life and education ==
Anila Jacob was born in Kottayam, Kerala in 1941. Although she initially applied for painting, she was admitted to the sculpture course at the Government College of Arts & Crafts, Madras (now Chennai) by the principal K. C. S. Paniker. She graduated in 1960 with a First Class Diploma in Fine Arts, ranking first.

She is married to Jacob Thomas and has two children.

== Career ==
Jacob began her career working with concrete and clay, later creating sculptures in carved wood, such as Figure (1969). Subsequently, she transitioned to working with welded metals like copper and brass, exemplified by works like Fish (2008). Her sculptures often draw on abstract themes inspired by the nature, environment, art forms, festivals, and daily life of Kerala. Some works associated with the Madras Movement, including Jacob's, are noted for their linear quality and 'frontality'. She has also worked with granite, particularly during sculptors' camps.

Jacob was one of the founding members of the Cholamandal Artists' Village near Chennai in 1966, established under the guidance of K. C. S. Paniker. She was one of the first two women artists, along with Arnawaz Driver (later Arnawaz Vasudev), to purchase land and build a studio within the commune. She also served as treasurer for the Progressive Painters Association.

She has participated in numerous exhibitions throughout her career, including the National Exhibition of Art in New Delhi multiple times (1962, 1963, 1964, 1966, 1968, 1976, 1978), Expo '70 in Japan, and shows in Washington D.C. (1963), Dubai (1976, 1980), Prakrit Art Gallery (Chennai, 2009), Durbar Hall Art Centre (Kochi, 2011), and the National Gallery of Modern Art (Bengaluru, 2023). She has also participated in several sculptors' camps organized by the Lalit Kala Akademi and state bodies, leading to installations in public spaces, including a granite sculpture in Connaught Place, New Delhi (circa 1970), and later works at Tippu Sultan Fort, Palakkad, Kozhikode Beach, and Fort Kochi. In 2018, her large sculpture titled "Unity in Diversity", made of copper, bronze, brass, and teakwood, was installed at Terminal 3 of Cochin International Airport. Her work is included in the permanent collection of the Lalit Kala Akademi, New Delhi.

Jacob describes her themes as largely abstract, often drawing inspiration from the culture and environment of Kerala, including its nature, traditional art forms, festivals, and daily life. Her sculpture Ambience, for instance, was her interpretation of the Kozhikode beach environment.

== Awards ==
- (1963) Award at the Exhibition of Ceramic Art in Washington D.C.
- (1964) Artists Handicraft Association Award in Madras
- (1965) National Award from the Lalit Kala Akademi, the first woman sculptor to receive this honour
- (1968) Madras State Lalit Kala Akademi Award
- (1976) Karnataka Chitra Kala Parishath Award from Mysore State
- (2011) Padmini Puraskaram from Kerala Lalithakala Akademi
- (2018) Raja Ravi Varma Puraskaram

The Kerala Lalithakala Akademi has planned a 40-min documentary, ‘Anilam’ to showcase her journey in art.
