= Jameela Malik =

Indian actress (died 2020)

- Born: Kollam
- Died: 28 January 2020 (age 74); Thiruvananthapuram
- Resting place: Jonakapuram, Kollam
- Occupation: Film actor
- Years active: 1972–1986, 2016–2020

Jameela Malik (1945/1946 – 28 January 2020) was an Indian actress in south Indian movies. She acted in Malayalam and Tamil films in the 1970s and 1980s. She received critical acclaim and audiences appreciation for all the movies she acted in. She entered the film industry with the film Aadhyathe Katha in 1972. She was the first woman from Kerala to graduate from the Film and Television Institute of India. She worked as teacher in schools. She was married for a year and had a son. She had also acted in more than twenty television serials during the 1990s. She died on 28 January 2020 at the age of 74.

== Partial filmography ==
=== Malayalam ===
- Faces (FTII student diploma film)
- Line Bus (1971)
- Sathi (1972)
- Aadhyathe Katha (1972)
- Ragging (1973)
- Eanippadikal (1973)
- Rajahamsam (1974)
- Neelakannukal (1974)
- Rahasyarathri (1974)
- Boy Friend (1975)
- Niramaala (1975)
- Ullasa Yaathra (1975)
- Chottanikkara Amma (1976)
- Sexilla Stundilla (1976)
- Swarna Medal (1977)
- Society Lady (1978)
- Avakaasham (1978)
- Kazhukan (1979)
- Daaliya Pookkal (1980)
- Lahari (1982)
- Pandavapuram (1986) as Devi teacher
- Oru Maymasa Pulariyil (1989)
- Unnikuttanu Joli Kitti (1990)

=== Tamil ===
- Velli Ratham (1979)
- Adhisaya Raagam (1979)
- Lakshmi (1979)
- Nadhiyai Thedi Vandha Kadal (1980)
- Ponnazhagi (1981)
- Sriman Srimati (1982)

=== As a dubbing artist ===
- Mayura (1975)

== Television ==
- Kayar
- Sagarika
- Mangalyapattu (Mazhavil Manorama)
- Chempattu (Asianet)
