= Jose Thomas (actor) =

Indian actor (born 1952)

- Born: 8 March 1952
- Died: 9 November 2019 (aged 67); Trivandrum, Kerala, India
- Occupation: Actor

Jose Thomas (1952–2019) was a senior journalist and a film-theatre personality who appeared in several films, notably Unnikuttanu Joli Kitti (1989) and Daya (1998). Unnikuttanu Joli Kitti tells the story of an unemployed youth, a character portrayed by Jose Thomas, who is jobless primarily due to callous social attitudes. The film won the national film award for other social issues in 1989.

== Career ==
Jose Thomas attended a film institute in Trivandrum in the early 1980s, where Adam Ayub was one of his professors. After that, he worked as an assistant/associate director on more than 50 films.He had worked as a senior journalist at a Malayalam news channel for a long time.He has also acted in several telefilms, as well as directed many plays and television documentaries. He is a multiple-time winner of the Kerala State Television Awards.

== Death ==
Jose Thomas died in a road accident in Kilimanoor, Trivandrum district, on November 9, 2019. He is survived by his wife, son, and daughter.
