= Niramaala =

- Directed by: P. Ramdas
- Written by: K. B. Sreedevi; P. Ramdas (dialogues); Sherif (dialogues)
- Screenplay by: Sherif
- Produced by: P. Ramdas
- Starring: KPAC Lalitha; Raghavan; Priya; Jameela Malik
- Cinematography: K. K. Menon
- Edited by: K. K. Lawrence
- Music by: M. K. Arjunan
- Production company: Upasana
- Distributed by: Upasana
- Release date: 25 April 1975
- Country: India
- Language: Malayalam

Niramaala is a 1975 Indian Malayalam film, directed and produced by P. Ramdas. The film stars KPAC Lalitha, Raghavan, Priya and Jameela Malik in the lead roles. The film has musical score by M. K. Arjunan.

== Cast ==
- KPAC Lalitha
- Raghavan
- Priya
- Jameela Malik
- Kalamandalam Kshemavathy
- Latha
- Nellikode Bhaskaran
- Premji
- Ravi Menon
- Santha Devi
- Sujatha

== Soundtrack ==
The music was composed by M. K. Arjunan and the lyrics were written by Yusufali Kechery and O. Ramdas.

| No. | Song | Singers | Lyrics | Length (m:ss) |
|---|---|---|---|---|
| 1 | "Innaleyenna Sathyam" | K. J. Yesudas | Yusufali Kechery | |
| 2 | "Kanneerin Kavithayithe" | K. J. Yesudas | Yusufali Kechery | |
| 3 | "Mottuvirinju" | P. Madhuri | Yusufali Kechery | |
| 4 | "Parayaan Naanam" | P. Jayachandran | Yusufali Kechery | |
| 5 | "Ponaal Pokattum" | Padmanabhan | Yusufali Kechery | |
| 6 | "There Was A Tree" | L. R. Eeswari, Chorus | O. Ramdas | |
