= College of Arts and Crafts, Patna =

Art school in Patna, India

College of Arts and Crafts
- Type: Undergraduate College
- Established: 1939
- Chancellor: Shri Fagu Chauhan
- Vice-Chancellor: Prof. Girish Kumar Choudhary
- Location: Patna, Bihar, India
- Affiliations: Patna University
- Website: College of Arts and Crafts

College of Arts and Crafts, established in 1939, is a fine arts college in Patna, Bihar. It is affiliated to Patna University, and offers undergraduate and postgraduate courses in fine arts.

== Accreditation ==
College of Arts and Crafts was awarded B grade by the National Assessment and Accreditation Council (NAAC).
