= Pandavapuram =

- Directed by: G. S. Panicker
- Written by: Sethu; G. S. Panicker (dialogues); Sethu (dialogues)
- Screenplay by: G. S. Panicker; Sethu
- Produced by: G. S. Panicker
- Starring: James; Appu; Jameela Malik; Master Deepak
- Cinematography: Divakara Menon
- Edited by: Suresh Babu
- Release date: 28 December 1986
- Country: India
- Language: Malayalam

Pandavapuram is a 1986 Indian Malayalam-language film, directed and produced by G. S. Panicker. The film stars James, Appu, Jameela Malik and Master Deepak.

== Cast ==
- James as Kunjukuttan
- Appu
- Jameela Malik as Devi Teacher
- Master Deepak as Raghu Nair
- Murali Menon as Jaaran
