= Roopesh =

Communist Party of India (Maoist) leader and militant

- Born: Peringottukara, Thrissur District
- Education: (CUSAT) Cochin University of Science and Technology, Ernakulam
- Known for: Prominent figure of Maoist movement in India
- Political party: Communist Party of India (Maoist)
- Spouse: Shyna
- Children: Ami and Savera

Praveen, commonly known by his nom de guerre, Roopesh, is a Communist Party of India (Maoist) leader in Kerala, India. He was the most wanted Maoist leader in Kerala state by Kerala Police.

== Life ==
Roopesh was born and brought up in Peringottukra in Thrissur district. He is a law graduate and had worked in the students' organization of the CPI-ML (Red Flag), CPI-ML (Janashakthi), CPI-ML (Peoples War). He became the leader of the Communist Party of India (Maoist) when the party was formed in Kerala. He is married to Shyna, upper division clerk in the Kerala High Court. She also later joined the Maoist party. They have two kids, Ami and Savera.

He has authored a novel which was published by two publishing houses in Kerala under the titles Vasanthathile Poomarangal (Flowering Trees of Spring) and Maoist.

As Roopesh is known for being a Maoist leader, he and his wife Shyna were the most wanted by the Kerala police at one point. Some of the groups he led were accused of distributing handbills containing pro-maoist messages in them, to villagers in the border areas. As Roopesh became a leader, he started to get more involved with all the movements after they combined the Communist Party of India (Marxist–Leninist) People's War (People's War Group), which was an underground communist party in India, and the Maoist Communist Centre of India, which was one of the largest armed Maoist groups, to create the Communist Party of India (Maoist). Roopesh and the other Maoist supporters have been inspired by the political philosophy of China's late chairman Mao Zedong.

== Movements ==
Roopesh and his other pro-maoist supporters would go around different states of India, leaving pro-maoist movement signs on walls, buildings, street corners, and many other popular places, where other people would see it. They would have signs targeted at President Obama of the United States, to try and get more attention and possibly help, as more people started to see what their movements were doing. Not only would they put signs out in different areas, but they would tend to be destructive if they did not get any of their demands. Roopesh and his gang/Pro-Maoist supporters that listened to him, would usually demand money or food, with weapons in their hands to establish their dominance in the area. When they would not get what they wanted they would destroy the citizens computers and other valuable items, and also would crush things that would help give away their position, so that there would be no evidence of them ever being there.

While Roopesh was still making public acts, he released a video to the common people where he said that the guerrillas had the support of the common people, especially the farmers. Roopesh's goal for making this statement is to try and get more supporters on his side, so that his movements become more affective. Roopesh was also in charge of the movement in the Western Ghat region which has been actively traveling between Karnataka, Tamil Nadu, and Kerala. As Roopesh was in charge of the Western Ghats Zonal Committee, most of the comrades had been very loose while following the methods of secret practice.

Roopesh planned to continue the CPI-Maoist goals with the new 'democratic revolution', which is really just to show how they are against the ideas of imperialism, feudalism, and comprador bureaucratic capitalism. As the CPI was formed after the merger of the People's War Group and the Maoist Communist Centre of India, Roopesh had a lot to act with behind his back, as they brought fear to the ruling class in what they were putting together. They want to carry out this revolution with violence by making statements and acts. Many innocents have been killed and continue to be killed.

Pro-Maoist slogans were being raised in court when Roopesh was arrested for continuing his Maoist activities in Kodagu and other areas. These pro-maoist slogans brought in more conflict, as they made a slogan for Jaleel, who was following Roopesh's orders and was killed by the police when he was acting out for pro-maoist movements. Jaleel had a number of different cases against him, and was killed during a Pro-Maoist movement in a gun fight. Jaleel and a couple of other in the movement went into a resort demanding food and money. The resort alerted the Kerala Police, which is when the gun fire started, and resulted in killing the Maoist leader Jaleel and injuring another member of the gang. No police officers were injured. This is what Roopesh is making different groups of pro-maoist leaders and supporters do, by trying to take control over everything, while forcefully demanding to get free things.

== Territory ==
Not all of India has been smothered by the Maoist's, but a large portion has. The "red corridor" is what is known for being Maoist territory as it ranges from Andhra Pradesh in the south to West Bengal in the east. But, they do have 21 of the 28 states affected by some type of pro-maoist groups. Not all states are fully taken over, if any, but definitely have been affected. The Maoists have grown and spread throughout a lot of India ever since they started their movements decades ago

== His Arrest ==
Roopesh and the Communist Party of India (Maoist) are looked at as a terrorist outfit by the Indian government, because Roopesh is trying to overthrow them, which why some of their members have been arrested including Roopesh. Roopesh was accused of leading many Maoist groups including one in Kaluru in 2010. Finally, Roopesh was arrested along with his wife, when the Andhra Pradesh Police force found them in the middle of an operation in Coimbatore. Roopesh was heading the People's Liberation Guerrilla Army, and was in hiding for many years. Roopesh and Shyna were accused of harboring another Maoist leader in their home, named Malla Raji Reddy who was arrested in Angamali, who has also been hiding for many years.

Roopesh and his wife were arrested as they were being connected to at least 30 different cases or events that they participated in. It took a lot of work to catch both Roopesh and Shyna, where the arrests only occurred due to multiples police forces of several states, coming together and working together to catch both of them. Police forces of the Andhra Pradesh police, Tamil Nadu, Kerala, Karnataka, and Telangana were the ones that came together. The Andhra police took charge in taking Roopesh and Shyna back to Kerala for questioning for their roles in all the cases they were being accused for.

== Family ==
Roopesh and Shyna were known as Kariyan and Priya in this committee among the Maoists. Roopesh and Shyna started showing their over protected sides by increasing security norms. By increasing security norms, they established camps and shelters inside forests where they kept children whose parents were participating in these pro-maoist movements, including their own two children. Documents were found and seized from Roopesh and Shyna, that led officials to many other crucial findings in terms of Maoist movements in this region.

Roopesh and his wife are still alive, but were arrested, and Roopesh is being held in the Viyyur Central Prison, which has tight security. His wife Shyna was released on bail, after spending three years in prison. The only reason we know this, is because one of Roopesh's daughter's Ami was getting married. Usually, criminals are not let out of prison to go to their daughters wedding. But, in India, they let Roopesh attend, with tight police security. They let Roopesh arrive in the morning, and had to get him back to prison by 5pm that night. They only let around 19 people attend the wedding, strictly only close relatives of the bride and groom. The police were strict and did not let anyone else attend because they were afraid that someone that used to work for Roopesh or other active pro-maoist activists would try and help him escape. The wedding of Aami with a West Bengal native Arkadeep was conducted with help of Communist Party of India leader Binoy Viswam.

Malla Raji Reddy was a central committee member who was on the run for 30 years, for many cases, including the murder of Scripado Rao, the former speaker of the Andhra Pradesh, the same city that arrested Roopesh. As Roopesh was leading his Pro-Maoist movements in India, his wife Shyna was getting more involved as well. Shyna started a new women's wing called the 'Bhavani Wing'.

The home minister of India Shivraj Patil wrote a letter to both of Roopesh's and Shyna's daughters, Ami who is 19 and Savera who is 10. The Minister felt bad for the two young girls as he spoke about his concern because he believed that the two young girls did not get enough love and care from their parents. Ami read the letter and felt obligated to write back, as she said, she believed she and her sister received enough love and care from their parents than most of the other kids they knew. The only thing that made it hard for them was when the Home Minister started sending the police after her parents when Ami was only 10 years old. They took the younger sister and mother into custody, as she continued to question the Home Ministers sympathy towards her and her sister. Ami responded with much hatred and anger from this letter, as she described how poorly she was treated by the police officers and how disrespectful they were. They would make rude and uncomfortable comments to Ami, and did things illegally, such as breaking her front door down without a search warrant.

== Main Goal as Maoist Leader ==
The purpose of the Communist party of India (Maoist) was to overthrow the government of India. They believed that the state was being run incorrectly, as both parties (People's war group and Communist centre of India), had different views of communism. Both parties did agree on who their enemies were, and also agreed that they would use extreme violence to get what they wanted. The People's War Group took the Marxist–Leninist stance, and the Communist. Centre of India took a Maoist stance. Both different stances of communism, but the CPI concluded that they would take a Marxism–Leninism-Maoism to guide their activities and decision making.

As Roopesh was heading the People's Liberation Guerilla Army, he wanted to capture the Political Power through guerrilla warfare, this was the tactics and military strategies used by the Communist Party of India, which was helped run by Roopesh, since he was one of the leaders.

Roopesh was one of the few Maoist leaders that called for an armed revolution. This confused non maoist supporters as they were trying to figure out how Roopesh and the other Maoist leaders operate. They could not find out what their end goal was and what they were planning next.

== Tactics they had to overthrow Government ==
As Roopesh and other Maoist leaders want to overthrow the government of India, they had certain tactics to help give them progress that would ultimately give them more support from other citizens in India. As Roopesh and other Maoist leaders wanted to keep control of things, they had several cases of them blowing up schools and transportation systems just to keep a certain population of India under their power. They would block this population within their state where they had the most power, where they would educate them and teach them their ways. The kids would grow up thinking with similar minds and thoughts of people in the Communist Party of India (Maoism).

The Maoists were blamed for sabotaging a crowded train with 100 passenger killed when it was derailed, in West Bengal in 2013. Another movement that they had in 2013 was when they attacked another passenger train, killing three people in Bihar. In 2010, the Maoist rebels killed at least 75 policeman in Dantewada district, Chhattisgarh. Not only are they destroying trains and killing police officers, but are also attacking schools, hundreds of them, and other infrastructures to show people that they are dangerous and will do anything to get what they want This is why the Pro-Maoist leaders and people that are involved are looked at as terrorist by the Indian Government, but are gaining a lot of attention by committing these terrible crimes.

When Roopesh was active and was one of the main leaders in his movement's, he had a large force of Pro-Maoists behind him for support. There were up to around 40,000 Maoist rebels who would be armed with AK-47 machine guns or light machine-guns, that the people either stole from police headquarters or bought from dealers in Nepal. It was not just grown men involved with holding these weapons as a scare. Just like Roopesh and his wife were involved with the pro-maoist movements, women and children also participated in trying to acquire these weapons.

== See also ==
- Arikkad Varghese
- Binoy Viswam
- Kerala Thunderbolts
- Rajan case
