= P. T. Bhaskara Panicker =

Indian writer and activist

Puthanmadathil Thamme Bhaskara Panicker
- Born: 15 October 1921 (age 104); Palakkad, Kerala, India
- Education: Palakkad Victoria College
- Children: 2

P. T. Bhaskara Panicker (1921–1997) was a famous social activist and writer of Kerala, India.

He was born on 15 October 1921 in Adakkaputhur in Palakkad district to K.M.V.Namppoothiri and Kavukkutty amma. After passing BSc and BT, he worked as a school teacher for two years. He joined the Communist party and spent three years underground and in jail. When the ban on the party was lifted he worked again as teacher in various schools for two years.

In the 1954 elections to the Malabar District Board, Panicker contested as a Communist party candidate and won; he became the President of the Board. In 1958 he was posted as the secretary to the Minister for Education in the first ministry of Kerala state. From 1959 to 1965 he served as a member of the Kerala Public Service Commission, from 1969 to 1971, Editor of the Viswavijnana kosam (10 volumes), and from 1971 to 1974, President of Grandhasalasamgham. Panicker was one of the leaders of the science popularisation movement Kerala Sasthra Sahithya Parishad, in the 1960s and 1970s.

He was the founder editor of journals including Sasthra Keralam (science journal for children) Primary Teacher (journal for school teachers), and Pusthaka Sameeksha (journal for book review ). He was also the editor of encyclopedias like Jeevacharithra kosam for children, Science Encyclopedia for children, Balavijnana kosam, Sasthra Vijnana kosam, Dravida Vijnana kosam.

He has been an active leader member of many organizations including KANFED (Kerala Association for Nonformal Education), STEPS Publications, Inter Disciplinary Studies, Bharana Parishkara Vedi (forum for the study of civil service reforms), and Kerala Sthala Nama Samithi (body for research on place names). He has written more than 100 books, mostly scientific and educational. His elder brother was Professor P. Kochunni Panicker, former principal of Government Victoria College, Palakkad.

He died on 30 December 1997.

Dr. S. Rajendu collected P.T. Bhaskara Panicker's life and a few of his articles "P.T.B. Jeevacaritrakosam" പി.ടി.ബി. ജീവചരിത്രകോശം into four volumes in 2023.

Major Works

Sasthra Parichayam

Sciencinte Kadhakal (In 3 parts)

Jeevante Kadha

Manushyan Enna Yanthram

Grahanthara Yathra
