= Maharaja's Technological Institute =

School in Thrissur City, Kerala, India

Coordinates: 10.5315°N 76.2216°E

Maharaja's Technological Institute, Government Polytechnic College, Thrissur
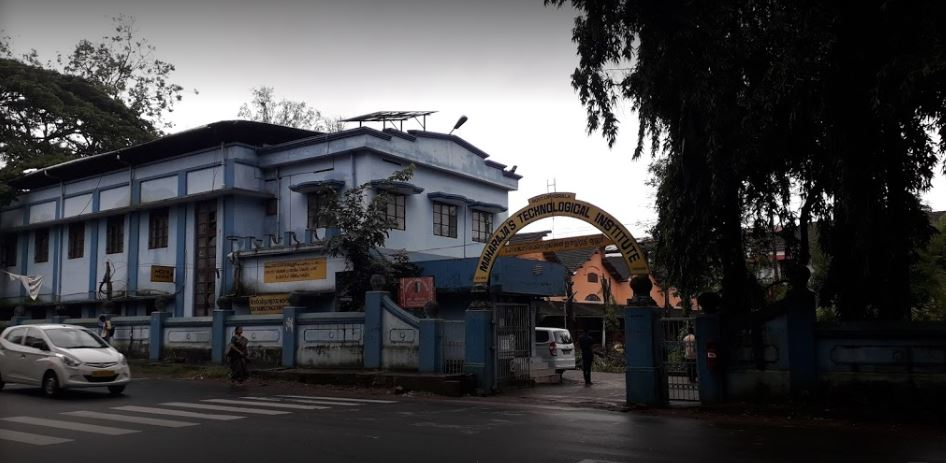
- Type: Government Polytechnic College
- Established: 1946
- Principal: Seena I T
- Location: Thrissur, Kerala, India
- Campus: Urban
- Nickname: MTI
- Website: www.mtithrissur.ac.in

Maharaja's Technological Institute known as MTI is a Government-run technical education institute situated in Thrissur City of Kerala, India. Founded in 1946 by Maharaja of Cochin to impart technical education for the people of the Kingdom of Cochin, it is the oldest technical institute and polytechnic in Kerala. The institution is now under the control of Directorate of Technical Education formed by the Government of Kerala.

== History ==
The polytechnic was started at the time of World War II as a training center for war technicians by the Government of India. The training center was named as Maharaja's Technological Institute in 1949. Diploma courses like Civil Engineering, Mechanical Engineering, Electrical Engineering, Electronics Engineering and Computer Engineering are also available at the institute.
