= V. K. Pavithran =

Indian film director

- Other name: Pavi
- Occupations: Director, Producer
- Years active: 1975-2002
- Spouse: Kalamandalam Kshemavathy
- Children: Eva Pavithran, Lakshmi

Vattamparambil Krishnan Pavithran, known mononymously as Pavithran (1950–2006), was an Indian cinema director. He primarily worked in Malayalam cinema.

== Career ==
After completing his graduation Pavithran made two unsuccessful attempts to get admission at the Pune Film Institute. This failure made him join a Law College nearby the film institute at Pune. Instead of studying law, he spent his time in the Film Institute seeing world classics and how films were made. He used this opportunity to befriend the institute students and understand cinema closely.

Sometime later, Pavithran applied to the Adyar Film Institute but failed to gain admission. During this time, he became friends with director P. A. Backer. His friendship with director P. A. Backer led to the making of the film Kabani Nadi Chuvannappol (When the River Kabani Turned Red, 1975), which he produced. He made his directorial debut with Yaro Oraal (Someone, 1978) for which G. Aravindan composed the music. The film was about the travails of urban life and identity crisis in the city. It introduced to Malayalam a genre of personal cinema, which is deliberately anti-realist. This won state awards for Best Direction, Best Editing and Best Cinematography. In 1981, he composed the music for T. V. Chandran's directorial debut Krishnankutty.

Later he made a shift in his form of filmmaking with Uppu (Salt, 1986), where he adopted the middle-stream cinema model. In Uppu, he told the story of the atavistic Muslim practice of male polygamy. It became controversial upon release. In an interview, Pavithran commented, "Salt is a trifle better - the truth always is. The religious laws are almost unknowingly misused by people, leading to the exploitation of those who succumb or resign themselves to religious and social pressures. Our intention was not to victimise or ridicule a minority." Uppu won the National Film Award for Best Regional Film.

In 1989, he directed Utharam which was written by M. T. Vasudevan Nair and featured Mammootty in the lead role. The film is about the investigative journey that the protagonist embarks on in order to find the reasons behind a poet's suicide, a bizarre step she took despite her picture-perfect life. The film became a major commercial and critical success. It has earned cult status and is now regarded as one of the best investigative thriller films in Malayalam cinema.

His last film Kuttappan Sakshi (Kuttappan, the Witness, 2002) begins in the pre-independence era when the communist movement was coming up in Kerala and inspiring poor peasants and other workers to raise their voice against the feudalism and the exploitation of the Nampoothiris.

== Death ==
Pavithran died on 26 February 2006. He was married to Kalamandalam Kshemavathy, with whom he had two daughters, Eva, an actress in South Indian films, and Lakshmi.

== Filmography ==
As director

- Yaro Oraal (1978) [Malayalam]
- Uppu (1986) [Malayalam]
- Uttaram (1989) [Malayalam]
- Bali (1991) [Malayalam]
- Kuttappan Sakshi (2002) [Malayalam]

As producer

- Kabani Nadi Chuvannappol (1976)
- Yaro Oraal (1978) [Malayalam]
