= Yaro Oraal =

1978 Malayalam film

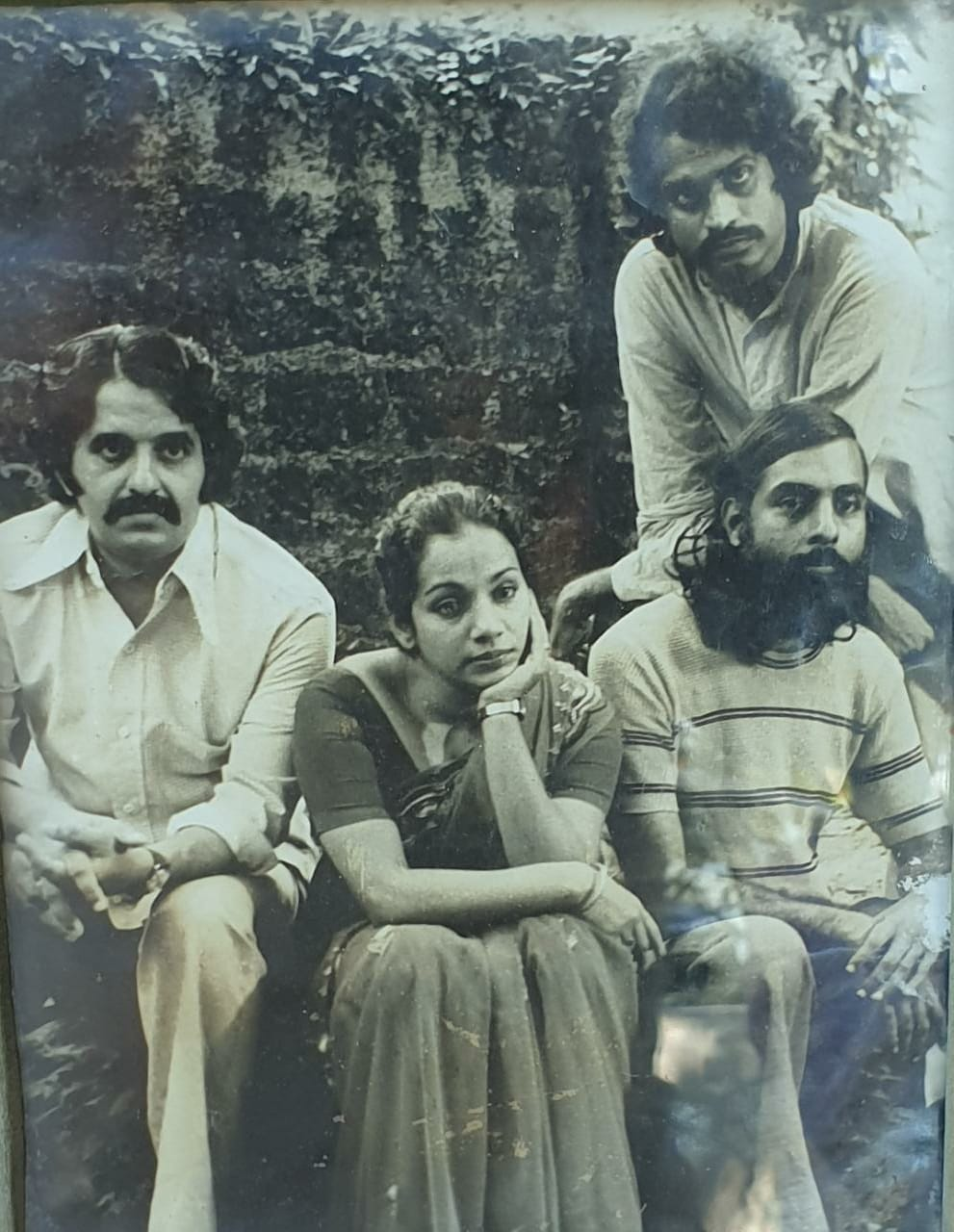
- Yaro Oraal production still with the cast (from left) Verma, Protima, ACK Raja and T. Ravindranath (above)
- Directed by: V. K. Pavithran
- Written by: V. K. Pavithran
- Produced by: V. K. Pavithran
- Starring: Protima; A. C. K. Raja; T. Ravindranath; Verma; Adam Ayub
- Cinematography: Madhu Ambat
- Edited by: P. Raman Nair
- Music by: G. Aravindan
- Production company: Saga Movies
- Release date: 1978
- Running time: 111 minutes
- Country: India
- Language: Malayalam

Yaro Oraal (English: Someone Unknown) is a 1978 Malayalam film written, produced and directed by V. K. Pavithran. It was his debut as a director. Employing a surrealist narrative, it deas with cynicism about death. The film's music is composed by acclaimed film director G. Aravindan.

== Cast ==
- Protima as Malathi
- T. Ravindranath as Hari
- Verma as Malathi's first husband
- A. C. K. Raja as Moorthy, the artist
- Adam Ayub

== Awards ==
1978 Kerala State Film Awards (India)

- Won – Kerala State Film Award – Special Jury Award – V. K. Pavithran
- Won – Kerala State Film Award for Best Cinematography – Madhu Ambat
- Won – Kerala State Film Award for Best Editor – P. Raman Nair

== Additional information ==
Actor T. Ravindranath ("Bank Ravi") later became a film producer, most notably with movies like Vasthuhara and Ponthan Mada; the documentary Mounam Sowmanasyam (1997); and Verukal (1997), a television series. Actor A. C. K. Raja later worked as an art director on KP Kumaran's Kattile Pattu (1982) Vipin Mohan was the associate cameraman on Yaro Oraal.
