= Ekakini =

- Directed by: G. S. Panicker
- Written by: P. Raman Nair
- Based on: "Karutha Chandran" by M. T. Vasudevan Nair
- Produced by: G. S. Panicker
- Starring: Shobha; Indra Balan; Ravi Menon
- Cinematography: Ramachandra Babu
- Edited by: Suresh Babu
- Music by: M. B. Sreenivasan
- Production company: Neo Films
- Distributed by: Neo Films
- Release date: 12 May 1978
- Country: India
- Language: Malayalam

Ekakini is a 1978 Indian Malayalam film, directed and produced by G. S. Panicker in his directorial debut. The film stars Shobha, Indra Balan and Ravi Menon in the lead roles. The film is an adaptation of the short story "Karutha Chandran" by M. T. Vasudevan Nair. Noted painter C. N. Karunakaran also made his debut as art director with this film. Suresh Babu won the Kerala State Film Award for Best Editor for Ekakini. It is considered the first road movie in Malayalam cinema.

== Cast ==
- Shobha
- Indra Balan
- Ravi Menon
