= Chintha Ravi =

Indian writer (1945–2011)

- Born: K. Ravindran; 1945; Kozhikode, Kerala, India
- Died: 4 July 2011 (aged 65); Thrissur, Kerala, India
- Education: Graduation in History, Diploma in Journalism
- Alma mater: Malabar Christian School (Kozhikode), Malabar Christian College (Kozhikode), Bharatiya Vidya Bhavan (Mumbai)
- Occupations: Writer, journalist, film critic, screenwriter, film director
- Writing career
- Language: Malayalam
- Notable awards: Best Film – Kerala State Film Awards; 1988 Ore Thooval Pakshikal Best Book on Cinema – Kerala State Film Awards; 1990 Cinemayude Rashtreeyam Best Travelogue – Kerala Sahitya Akademi Award; 2009 Ente Keralam

K. Ravindran (1945–2011), better known by his pen-name Chintha Ravi, was an Indian writer, journalist, film critic and film director.

== Biography ==
Born in Kannadikkal in Kozhikode as the son of Kunnummal Krishnan and Lakshmi, Ravindran studied at Kozhikode Malabar Christian School, Malabar Christian College, and did a journalism course at the Bharatiya Vidya Bhavan in Mumbai. He soon joined Communist Party of India's ideological journal Chintha and later became a member of the editorial board of the weekly, which earned him the pen-name Chintha Ravi. He also worked for a while with the Kalakaumudi weekly. As a writer, he is best known for his travelogues like Swiss Sketchukal, Akalangalile Manushyar and Buddha Patham. Ente Keralam won the Kerala Sahitya Akademi Award for Best Travelogue. His Cinemayude Rashtreeyam, a book on art criticism and cinema, won the Kerala State Film Award for Best Book on Cinema in 1990.

He debuted as a director with the Telugu film Harijan. His film Ore Thooval Pakshikal (1988), featuring music by G. Aravindan, won many accolades including the Kerala State Film Award for Best Film. He also directed several documentaries including the national award-winning Maunam Sowmanasyam, a documentary on G. Aravindan. His films were inspired by the Neo-Gramscianist theories. He also acted a small part in P.A. Backer's Kabani Nadi Chuvannappol (1975).

His visual travelogue serial entitled Ente Keralam was telecast in Asianet for many years. Ravi traveled even to the remote villages of Kerala for this programme.

Chintha Ravi died on 4 July 2011, aged 65, at a private hospital in Thrissur. He was under treatment for lung cancer. He is survived by wife N Chandrika, daughter of writer Devaki Nilayangode, and son Thathagathan, an anthropology research scholar in the University of Texas.

== Bibliography ==
Travelogues

- Akalangalile Manushyar
- Digaruvile Aanakal
- Swiss Sketchukal
- Mediterranean Venal
- Vazhikal Vyakthikal Ormakal
- Budhapatham
- Seethakala Yathrakal
- Ente Yathrakal
- Raveendrante Yathrakal (collection of all travelogues)

Others

- Athiranippookkal
- Kadine Nokkumbol Ilakale Kannunnathu
- Antonio Gramsci
- Cinemayude Rashtreeyam
- Kalavimarsam: Marxist Manadandam

== Filmography ==
- Harijan
- Iniyum Marichittillatha Nammal (1980)
- Ore Thooval Pakshikal (1988)
