= Sadasiva Brahmendra =

18th century Indian saint, composer of Carnatic music and philosopher

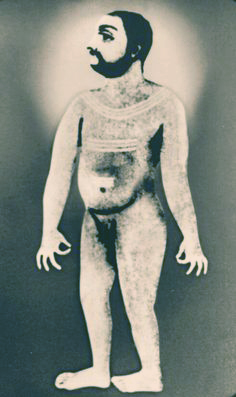
- Artist impression of Sadasiva Brahmendra. No contemporary portraits survive. He was generally described as naked just as many Sannyasas.
- Born: Madurai, Madurai Nayak Kingdom
- Died: Apr–May 1756; Nerur, Kingdom of Mysore (modern-day Tamil Nadu)
- Major shrine: Adishtanam at Nerur (Tamil Nadu), Manamadurai, Kashi, Omkareshwar, Karachi

Sadasiva Brahmendra (16th century) was a saint, composer of Carnatic music and Advaita philosopher and Sishya of the great saint Shri Paramasivendra Saraswati (57th Shankaracharya of Kanchi Kamakoti Peetham), who lived near Thiruvenkadu, Tamil Nadu. Even Today, many saints from big and small mathas come and prostrate at his adhisthanam to pay their respects to him and his guru parampara. Unfortunately only a few of his compositions have survived, but they are recognized as great compositions of Carnatic music.

== Life ==
Sadasiva was born in 16th Century into a Telugu Brahmin couple, Moksha Somasundara Avadhaani and Parvati. His initial name was Sivaramakrishna.

Sadasiva lived in Kumbakonam, in Tamil Nadu in the 16th to 18th century (Details which aren't traceable). He went to learn vedas and other various subjects in Sanskrit in Thiruvisanallur. His contemporaries such as Sridhara Venkatesa Ayyaval.

Sivaramakrishna left his home in search of truth. He took Sanyasa from a very Old Saint near Thiruvisanallur and reached Thiruvenkadu and in-turn became the sishya of Sri Paramasivendra Saraswati (57th Shankaracharya of Kanchi Kamakoti Peetham) who was staying there. He studied under his guidance for 18 years and attained knowledge comparable only to the Adi Shankara Himself. After leaving the Thiruvenkadu, he is said to have wandered around, naked or semi-naked, and often in a trance-like state. He was reclusive and often meditated, and was described as being in a "supremely intoxicated state". He is said to have performed many miracles whilst alive, some of the most prominent are provided below. His jiva samadhi site is briefly mentioned in 'Autobiography of a Yogi', Chapter 41 by Paramahamsa Yogananda.

On the river banks of Cauvery in Mahadhanapuram, he was asked by some children to be taken to Madurai, more than 100 miles away, for an annual festival. The saint asked them to close their eyes, and a few seconds later they reopened their eyes and found they were in Madurai. He also wrote the Atma Vidya Vilasa, an advaitic work.

There is an epilogue to this story. The next day, another youth, incredulous at hearing this story, asked Sadasiva to take him also to this festival. It is said that the youth immediately found himself in the distant city. When it was time to return, Sadasiva was nowhere to be found. The youth had to make his way back on foot.

Whilst relaxing near a heap of grains, he began meditating. The farmer who owned the land mistook Sadasiva for a thief, and confronted him. The farmer raised his stick to hit the saint, but became a statue. He remained in this state until the morning, when Sadasiva finished meditating and smiled at the farmer. The farmer was restored to his normal state, and asked the saint for forgiveness.

At another time, while meditating on the banks of the Cauvery river, he was carried away by a sudden flood. Weeks later, when some villagers were digging near a mound of earth, their shovels struck his body. He woke up and walked away.

== Temple service ==
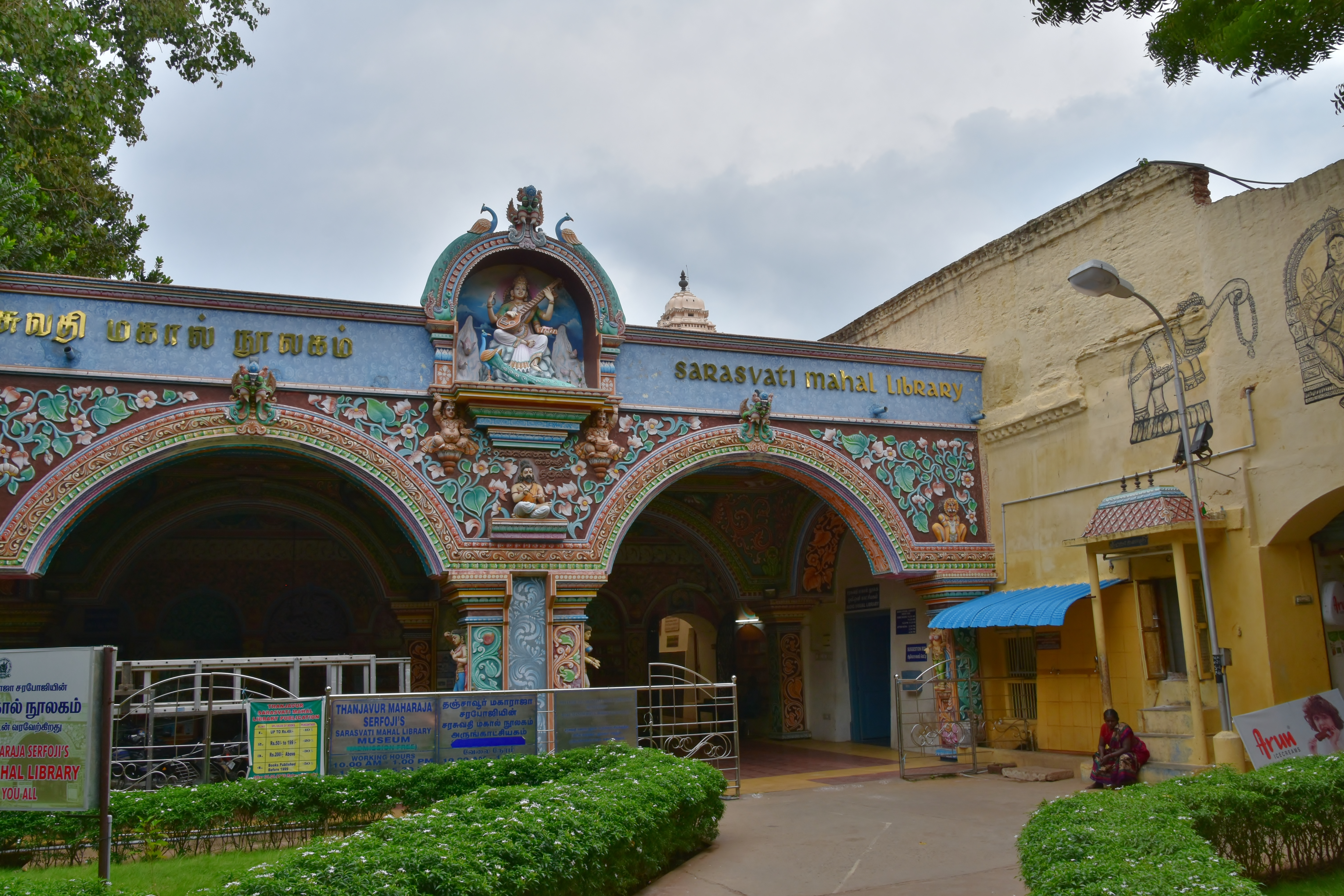
Sarasvati Mahal Library in Thanjavur, one of the oldest libraries in Asia was visited by Brahmendra

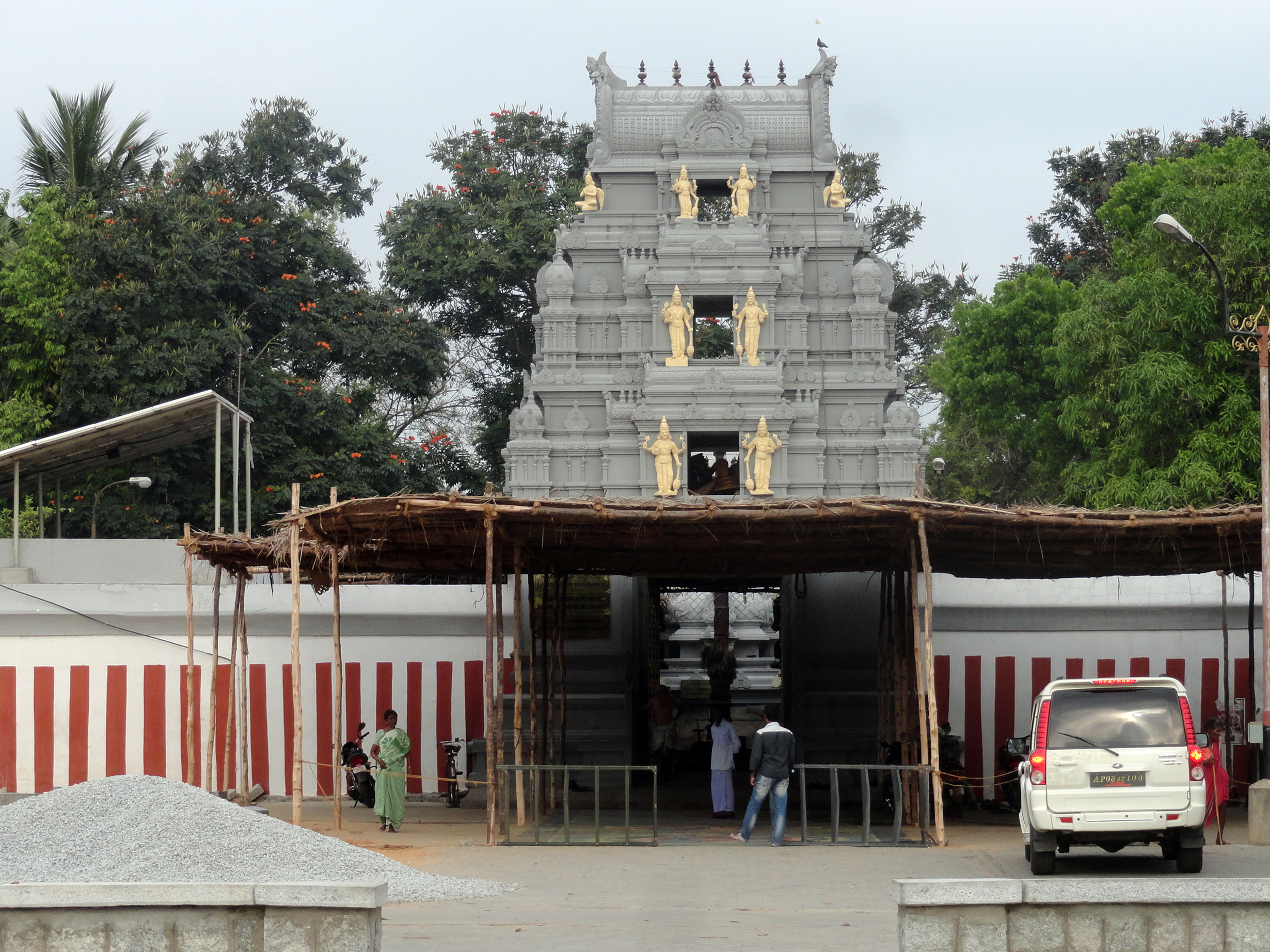
Prasanna Venkateswara temple

He is said to have met the Raja Thondaiman of Pudukottai and initiated him into the Dakshinamurthy Mantra. He is said to have written the mantra on sand. This sand was picked up by the king and it is in the worship of the royal family till now in the Dakshinamurthy temple inside the Pudukottai palace in Pudukottai.

He was responsible for installing the deity Punnainallur Mariamman near Thanjavur and guided the installation at Devadanapatti Kamakshi temple. He was also involved in the thanthonimalai Kalyana Venkatesa Perumal temple at Karur. He also installed the Hanuman Murthi in the Prasanna Venkateswara temple at Nalu Kal Mandapam in Thanjavur. He instructed the king of Tanjore to establish the Saraswathi Mahal Library, which still operates today.

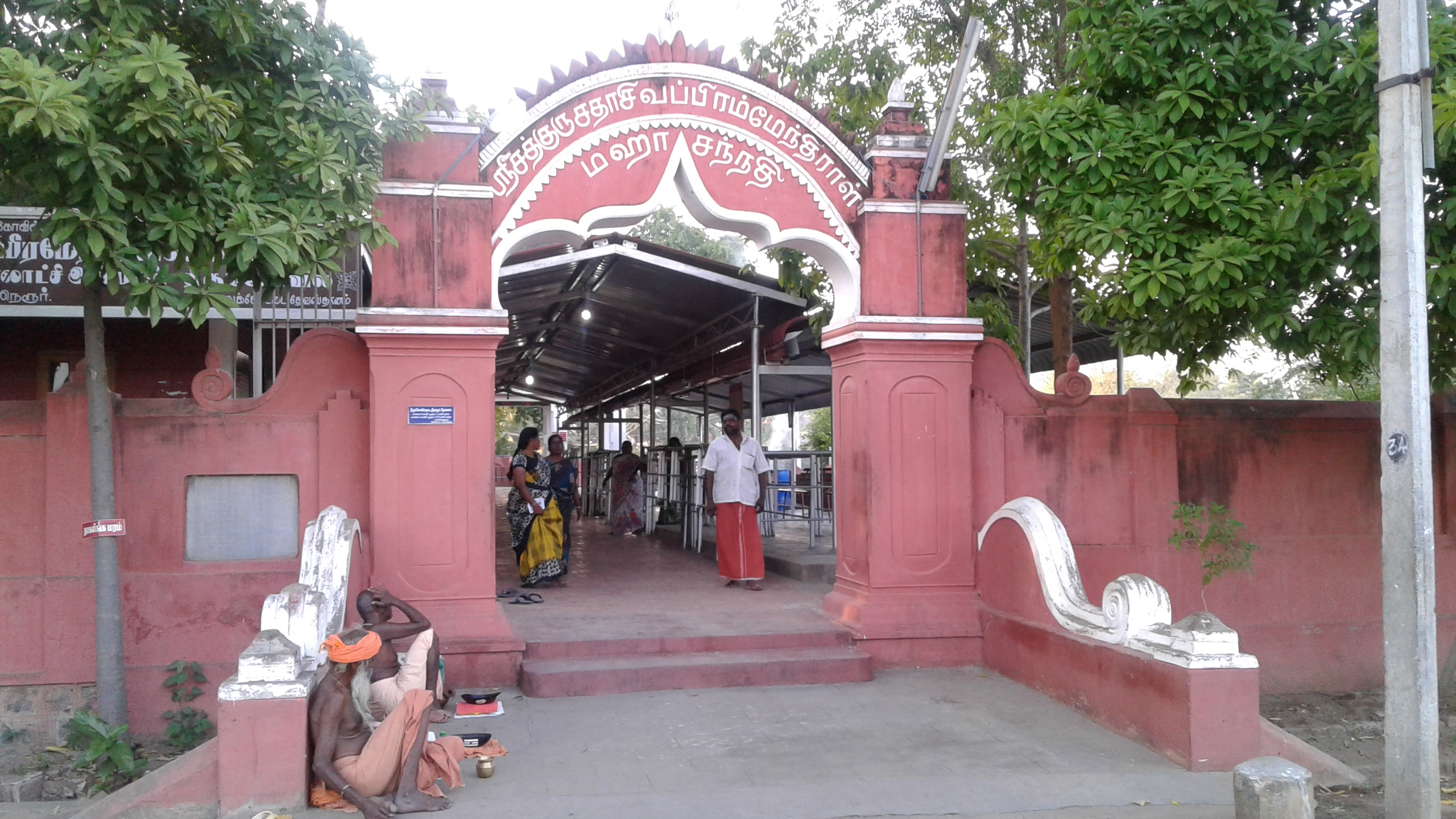
samathi of Sadasiva Brahmendra

He also installed Lord Ganesh and a powerful Ganesh Yantra at the Thirunageshwaram Rahu Stalam temple at Kumbakonam. An inscription in the temple bears testimony to this fact. The shrine can still be seen at the entrance to the temple.

There is a shrine for him in the Nandrudayan Vinayaka Temple, Trichy.

He has five samadhis :

- Nerur (Tamil Nadu)
- Manamadurai
- Omkareshwar
- Kashi
- Karachi – Details about this Samadhi are not much known. But it was active and there were visitors from India before Partition. It was supposed to be located close to the Indus river

Every year in Nerur and Manamadurai, music festivals are conducted in his honor. In Manamadurai, his samadhi is located at the Somanathar temple

Sri Sri Sacchidananda Shivabhinava Nrusimha Bharati, (fondly referred to as "Abhinava Shankara"), the 33rd Jagadguru of the Dakshinamnaya Sringeri Sharada Peetham had visited Nerur and composed two slokas in praise of Sri Sadasiva Bramhendra – Sadasivendra Stava and Sadasivendra Pancharatna

Sri Vasudevanand Saraswati, known as Tembe Swami, a great saint of Maharashtra, visited Nerur in the year 1907 and composed a hymn on Sadasiva Brahmendral. This incident is mentioned in his biography.
