= Sriya Reddy =

Indian actress (born 1978)

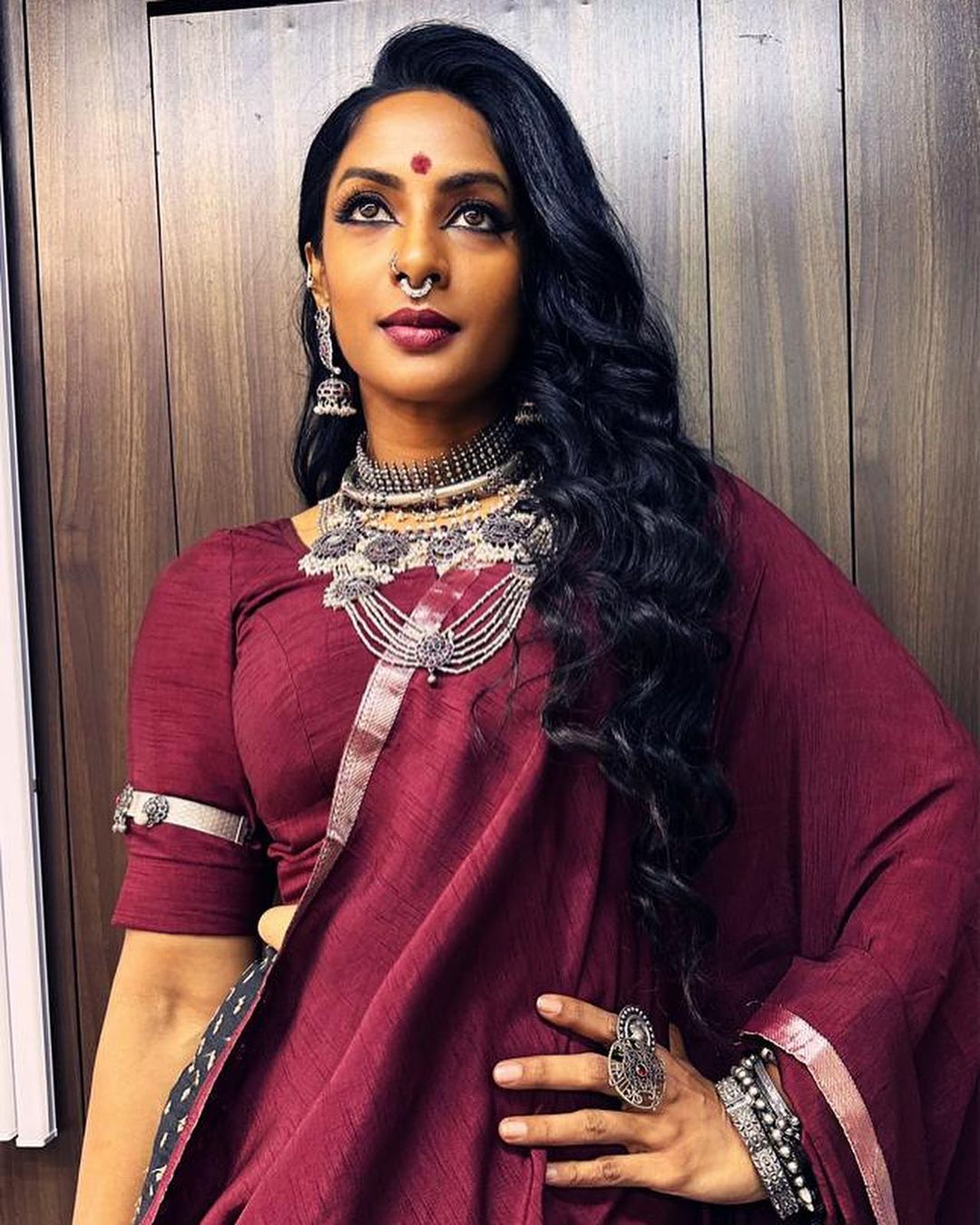
- Reddy in 2023
- Born: 3 April 1978 (age 48); Chennai, Tamil Nadu, India
- Education: Ethiraj College for Women
- Occupations: Actress, Model, VJ
- Years active: 2002–present
- Height: 168 cm (5 ft 6 in)
- Spouse: Vikram Krishna (m. 2008)
- Children: 1
- Father: Bharath Reddy
- Relatives: Vishal (brother-in-law); G. K. Reddy (father-in-law)

Sriya Reddy (born 3 April 1978) is an Indian actress, television presenter and video jockey who primarily works in Tamil and Telugu cinema. Born to former Indian test cricketer Bharath Reddy, Sriya worked as a successful video jockey at SS Music before pursuing an acting career in Tamil, Telugu and Malayalam films.

Following her debut in Samurai (2002), she appeared in nearly a dozen Tamil, Telugu and Malayalam films, with Black (2004), Thimiru (2006) and Kanchivaram (2008) and Salaar: Part 1 – Ceasefire (2023) being her best known productions.

== Early life ==
Sriya was born into a Telugu family to Bharath Reddy, an Indian cricketer. She did her schooling at Good Shepherd School and went on to study at Ethiraj College Chennai. When she was a child, cricketers Ravi Shastri and Sandeep Patil visited their home and complimented her good voice. During school, she received modelling offers, but had to decline them, since her father wanted her to finish her education first. When she was offered an audition for the leading music channel Southern Spice Music, she was able to convince her father that she would both study and be a VJ.

== Career ==
Sriya, after winning the VJ hunt by SS Music, started hosting shows such as Connect and Phonetastic. However, she cited that she needed five auditions before being selected. She became popular as 'VJ Sriya' on SS music, becoming familiar among young viewers. She then accepted her first acting assignment for a Telugu film, in spite of her parents' aversion to her acting in films, citing that she signed the contract when her father was asleep. Her debut release, however, happened to be Balaji Sakthivel's directorial debut Samurai, in which she played a supporting character alongside Vikram. Her maiden Telugu release Appudappudu failed at the box office, following which she did not work in films for over a year. Her next release was in 2004, when she debuted in Malayalam with the Mammootty-starrer Black. She played the role of a young Tamil village woman who comes to town in search of her missing husband, carrying a "thoroughly de-glamourized look" in the film, totally contrary to her real-life look, with director Renjith, on his decision to cast her for the role, citing that she had a "very Dravidian face". Sriya considered this film as her highest point of career for having acted alongside Malayalam actor Mammootty. Later that year, she also starred in an English film named 19 Revolutions, directed by Chicago-based Shridhar Reddy, which featured Sriya as a rich girl who wants to rob her father and did "very well in the US", according to Sriya.

In 2005, she had a single release, the Malayalam action film Bharathchandran I.P.S., which was very successful at the box office. Her performance as an IPS police officer gained positive remarks, with critics comparing her to Vijayashanti. In 2006, she had four film releases, with her two Tamil films gaining most fame. The action flick Thimiru, directed by Tarun Gopi and starring Vishal Krishna, her later brother-in-law, portrayed Sriya as a rustic, loud woman with negative shades, with her performance being widely critically acclaimed. In the other Tamil release, the S. Shankar-produced drama film Veyil, directed by Vasanthabalan, Sriya was part of an ensemble cast featuring Bharath, Pasupathy, Bhavana and Priyanka Nair. The film opened to rave reviews and became acknowledged with several noted film awards, including the National Film Award and two Filmfare Awards. She appeared in a pivotal role in Priyadarshan's art film Kanchivaram, which, too, became highly acclaimed and was honoured with the National Film Award, while Sriya received nominations for the Filmfare Award and the Vijay Award. After completing shooting for the film, she got married and stopped acting.

Eight years later, she made a comeback with a film titled Andaava Kaanom by director Vadivel, in which she will portray an angry village woman Shanthi.

== Personal life ==
Sriya married actor-producer Vikram Krishna on 9 March 2008 at Park Sheraton hotel in Chennai. Vikram Krishna is the son of veteran film producer G. K. Reddy and brother of actor Vishal Krishna and had starred in a couple of Tamil films, before turning full-time film producer, primarily producing films featuring his brother Vishal in the lead role under his GK Films Corporation. Sriya since has been co-producing films with her husband. The couple have a daughter, Amalia.

== Filmography ==
=== Film ===
Year	Title	Role	Language	Notes
2002	Samurai	Nisha	Tamil	Debut
2003	Appudappudu	Radhika	Telugu	
2004	Black	Anandam	Malayalam	
2004	19 Revolutions	Shirin Kolhatkar	English	
2005	Bharathchandran I.P.S.	Hema	Malayalam	
2006	Amma Cheppindi	Razia	Telugu	
2006	Oraal		Malayalam	
2006	Thimiru	Easwari	Tamil	
2006	Veyil	Paandiyammal	Tamil	
2007	Pallikoodam	Jhansi	Tamil	
2008	Kanchivaram	Annam Vengadam	Tamil	Nominated, Filmfare Award for Best Tamil Actress; Nominated, Vijay Award for Best Supporting Actress
2009	Thoranai	–	Tamil	Producer
2011	Vedi	–	Tamil	Producer
2018	Sila Samayangalil	Deepa	Tamil	
2023	Salaar: Part 1 – Ceasefire	Radha Rama Mannar	Telugu	Nominated, Filmfare Award for Best Supporting Actress-Telugu; Nominated, SIIMA Award for Best Supporting Actress - Telugu; Nominated, IIFA Utsavam Award for Best Supporting Actress- Telugu
2025	They Call Him OG	Geetha Chakri	Telugu	
TBA	Andava Kaanom †	Shanthi	Tamil	
TBA	Mahakali †	Goddess Kaali	Telugu	

=== Television ===
Year	Title	Role	Language	Network	Notes
2022–present	Suzhal: The Vortex	Regina Thomas	Tamil	Amazon Prime Video	
2024	Thalaimai Seyalagam	Kottravai Alias Shakthi Alias Durga	Tamil	Zee5	
2024	Sa Re Ga Ma Pa Seniors 4	Guest	Tamil	Zee Tamil	
