= Thalaimai Seyalagam =

- Genre: Political thriller
- Written by: G. Vasanthabalan
- Screenplay by: Dialogues: S.K. Jeeva; Bharani Giri
- Story by: S Jeyamohan; G. Vasanthabalan
- Directed by: G. Vasanthabalan
- Starring: Kishore; Sriya Reddy; Bharath; Kani Kusruti
- Theme music composer: Ghibran; Simon K. King
- Country of origin: India
- Original language: Tamil
- No. of seasons: 1
- No. of episodes: 8

Production
- Executive producers: Pooja Sarathkumar; Krishna Chandar Elango
- Producers: Radhika Sarathkumar; R. Sarathkumar
- Production location: Chennai
- Cinematography: Ravishankaran
- Editor: Ravikumar M
- Camera setup: Multi-camera
- Running time: approx.30-40 minutes per episode
- Production company: Radaan Mediaworks

Original release
- Network: ZEE5
- Release: 17 May 2024

Thalaimai Seyalagam (transl. Chief Secretariat) is a 2024 Indian Tamil-language political thriller streaming television series written and directed by Vasanthabalan for ZEE5. The show revolves around the cutthroat world of Tamil Nadu politics. The show is produced by Radhika Sarathkumar and R. Sarathkumar under the banner of Radaan Mediaworks.

The series explores the journey of one woman's quest for power, shedding light on the pivotal role of women in shaping political ideologies. The principal characters of the series include Kishore, Sriya Reddy, Bharath and Kani Kusruti. The eight episodic series premiered on ZEE5 on 17 May 2024.

== Synopsis ==
In the turbulent landscape of Tamil Nadu's political arena, Chief Minister Arunachalam finds himself entangled in a trial concerning a corruption scandal from fifteen years ago. With his hold on power slipping, ambitious individuals lurk like predators, eagerly eyeing the prestigious CM position. Arunachalam's foes, including opposition leader Amudhavalli, his daughter, and his scheming son-in-law Hariharan, plot to seize control. Meanwhile, Arunachalam's trusted ally Kotravai, an experienced journalist, encounters unexpected challenges. As the saga unfolds, diverse strands of inquiry converge, revealing long-concealed truths.

== Cast ==
- Kishore as Chief Minister Arunachalam
- Sriya Reddy as Kottravai
- Bharath as Inspector Manigandan and later DCP
- Dharsha Gupta as Sundari
- Kani Kusruti as Durga
- Remya Nambeesan as Amudhavalli
- Y. G. Mahendran as Advocate Rangarajan
- Santhana Bharathi as Minister Selvapuviarasan
- Shaji Chen as Political broker Krishnamurti
- Adithya Menon as CBI officer Nawaz Khan
- Niroop Nandakumar as Minister Hariharan
- Sara Black as Maya
- Siddharth Vipin as Pragadeesh
- Kanya Bharathi

== Development ==
=== Production ===
The series was announced as a part of ZEE5's future slate of content in April 2022. The series is Radhika and R. Sarathkumar`s first collaboration with ZEE5. The show based on the life of the politician in Tamil Nadu.

Vasanthabalan of Veyil (2006), Angaadi Theru (2008) and Kaaviya Thalaivan (2014) fame, has directed the series that deals with the politician. The music for the series was composed by Ghibran. The cinematography was handled by Ravishankar, editing by Ravikumar M and Producer by Radhika Sarathkumar and R. Sarathkumar under the banner of Radaan Mediaworks.

=== Casting ===
Kishore was cast in the leading role of Chief Minister Arunachalam. Sriya Reddy was cast as Journalist Kottravai. actors Bharath and Adithya Menon were selected as police officers. Veteran actors Y. G. Mahendran plays a lawyer and Santhana Bharathi plays an political leader. Bigg boss Tamil 5 fame Niroop Nandakumar makes his movie debut.

=== Release ===
It was announced in April 2022, by Radhika Sarathkumar that the series will be released on ZEE5. The first look Motion poster on 3 May 2024, The poster features a Kishore reading a newspaper which has a headline of his arrest and it also says that he has been accused of corruption and asks if the union government is responsible for this.

The same day, first Teaser was released and the series was scheduled for a worldwide release on 17 May on ZEE5. It has also been dubbed in Telugu.

== Reception ==
Abhinav Subramanian of The Times of India rated 2.5 out of 5 and stated that "Vasanthabalan’s efforts are evident in filming Thalaimai Seyalagam. However, the series struggles to find a balance between its promising premise and its flawed execution. It offers glimpses of interest and strong performances, but is hampered by predictable plot twists, stretched screenplay and moments of Tamil serial vibe."

Divya Nair of Rediff.com rated it 2/5 stars and suggested, "If you are looking for an average political thriller with good performances, Thalamai Seyalagam may interest you."
