= Nandrudayan Vinayaka Temple =

Hindu Temple

Nandrudayan Vinayaka Temple is a Hindu temple situated on East Boulevard road in the neighbourhood of Devathanam in Tiruchirappalli district. The presiding deity is the Hindu god Ganesha. The Nandrudayan Vinayaka temple is one of the few temples which contains an idol of Ganesha depicted in human form.

== History ==
The Nandrudayan Vinayaka temple is one of the oldest Hindu temples in Tiruchirappalli city. The 7th century Nayanmar, Campantar has sung in praise of it.

== Architecture ==
The temple is built in the Dravidian style of architecture and contains a 5-foot tall idol of Vinayaka in human form with an enormous Nandi facing it on the eastern side. There is also a separate shrine with a 4-foot statue of Adi Vinayaka within the temple complex. There are idols of Adi Sankara, Veda Vyasa, Gayatri, Sadasiva Brahmendra and Pattinathar within the smaller shrine.
