= Sridhara Venkatesa Ayyaval =

Hindu saint

Sridhara Venkatesa Dikshitar (13 August 1635–1720), popularly known as Ayyaval, was a Hindu saint and composer who lived in the village of Thiruvisanallur in the then Thanjavur Maratha kingdom.

== Ancestry and early life ==
Sridhara Ayyaval was born in Mysore and was the son of one Sridhara Lingarayar. Ayyaval's father was the Diwan of the Mysore kingdom. When Ayyaval, a staunch devotee of the Hindu god Shiva, was offered the post of Diwan upon his father's death, he rejected the offer and instead, chose to embark on a pilgrimage of the Saivite temples of the Cauvery Delta region.

== Events ==
On Ayyaval's arrival in Thanjavur, he was offered all assistance and respect by Shahuji, the then ruler of the Thanjavur Maratha kingdom. Shortly afterwards, he restored a Brahmin dead of snakebite to life and thus acquired a reputation as a miracle-worker. He was attracted to the Mahalingeswarar shrine at Thiruvidaimarudur and set up his house at the neighbouring village of Thiruvisainallur. He used to visit the nearby Karkateshwarar shiva temple daily.

Various events are associated with the life of Sridhara Ayyaval. Chastised for feeding a hungry beggar by giving food meant to be offered in Sraddha ceremony by Brahmins who insisted that Ayyaval should bath in holy Ganges and thus purify himself, Ayyaval prayed to Shiva and recited the Gangashtakam sloka appealing to the goddess Ganges. According to the traditions of the Sri Sridhara Ayyaval Mutt, when Ayyaval had finished reciting the Gangashtakam, water from the holy Ganges river flowed out of the well in his house. This festival is celebrated even today in the town of Thiruvisainallur.

Ayyaval outlived most of his contemporaries. He is believed to have died in 1720 at the age of 85. His wife also passed away on the same day. According to most accounts, he disappeared mysteriously while on a visit to the Mahalingeswarar Temple. On entering the temple, Ayyaval's soul entered the idol of the presiding deity, Mahalingeswarar, and became one with him.

Sridhara Ayyaval was a contemporary of Sri Bodhendra Saraswathi and Sadasiva Brahmendra. Sri Bodhendra, Sri Ayyaval and Sri Sadguru Swamikal is considered to be the trinity in Bhajana Sampradaya. There are mutt's in Govindapuram Village, Thiruvisanallur Village and Marudanallur Village accordingly for the trinity. All these three villages are situated in Kumbakonam, Tamil Nadu, India.

He also holds an important status in Dakshina Sampradaya Namasankirthanam and is a member of the "trinity". Several songs have been written and composed on him and are always sung in any proper Namasankirthanam. The krithis are almost always followed by the namavali "Gangadhara Gangadhara", referring to Ayyaval as the bearer and bringer of the Ganges.

He has composed a number of works and slokas (1) Akhyashashti (2) Daya shatakam (3) Matrubhtasatakam (4) Stuti paddati (5) Shivabhakthikalpalatha (6) Shivabhaktha lakshanam (7) Taravali stotram (8) Artihara stotram. (9) Kuleerashtakam (10) Jambhunathashtakam (11) Doshapariharashtakam (12) Gangashtakam (13) Krishnadwadasamanjari (14) Achyuthashtakam (15) Dola navarathnamala (16) Padamanimanjari - a Sanskrit dictionary (17) Shahajiraja charitam (18) Bhagavannama Bhushanam (19) Sohantra Vilasam (20) Namammruta rasayanam
