= Priyanka Nair =

Indian actress

- Nair in 2026
- Born: Vamanapuram, Kerala, India
- Occupations: Actress; model
- Years active: 2000–present
- Spouse: Lawrence Ram (m. 2012)
- Children: 1

Priyanka Nair is an Indian actress who predominantly works in the Malayalam film industry. She made her debut in the Tamil film Veyyil in 2006. She won the 2008 Kerala State Film Award for best actress for her role in Vilapangalkappuram.In September 2026, she was appointed as the vice-chairperson of the Kerala State Chalachitra Academy.

== Early and personal life ==
Priyanka completed her Higher Secondary School Certificate studies and studied Physics at the Mar Ivanios College, Thiruvananthapuram. During that time, she was also acting part-time in several Malayalam television series, including Umakkuyil, Megham and Akashadoothu. She considered acting in serials as "just time pass" and went on to add that she never intended to act in films, but rather wanted to be a lecturer.

Priyanka married Tamil film director and actor Lawrence Ram on 23 May 2012 at Attukal Temple in Thiruvananthapuram. They have a son Mukund, born on 18 May 2013. The couple filed for divorce in 2015.

== Career ==
=== Film ===
She made her feature film debut in the Vasanthabalan-directed Tamil drama film Veyyil (2006) that was produced by director Shankar, in which she starred along with Pasupathy. Her debut Malayalam film was Kichamani MBA (2007) that featured her in a supporting role. The following year she starred in T. V. Chandran's Vilapangalkkappuram along with Suhasini and Biju Menon; her performance earned her the Kerala State Film Award for Best Actress. Rediff named her the top Malayalam actress of 2009, citing that she "came up with a scintillating performance". She rose to popularity after appearing opposite Mohanlal in Ividam Swargamanu. Priyanka loves riding her Royal Enfield Bullet motorcycle.

=== Political ===
Priyanka Nair comes from a family with a background in the Indian National Congress. Her father was active in the party's district-level organisation in Vamanapuram. During her school years, she was involved with the children's organisation National Balatarangam, serving as its area and district president and twice as its state president. She was also active in the Kerala Students Union (KSU) during her college years.

During the 2026 Kerala Legislative Assembly election campaign, she campaigned for the United Democratic Front (UDF), visiting approximately nine constituencies where she had personal connections.

== Awards ==
Kerala State Film Award

- 2008 – Kerala State Film Award for Best Actress- Vilapangalkkappuram

== Filmography ==
Year	Title	Role	Language	Notes
2006	Veyyil	Thangam	Tamil	
2007	Tholaipesi	Anitha	Tamil	
2007	Thirutham	Vandana	Tamil	
2007	Kichamani MBA	Kalyani	Malayalam	
2008	Vilapangalkkappuram	Zahira	Malayalam	Kerala State Film Award for Best Actress
2009	Bhoomi Malayalam	Annie Joseph	Malayalam	
2009	Samastha Keralam PO	Radha	Malayalam	
2009	Keshu	Shalini	Malayalam	
2009	Ividam Swargamanu	Betsy Varghese	Malayalam	
2011	Orma Mathram	Deepa Pradeep	Malayalam	
2011	Zindagi	Sharmi	Kannada	
2012	Sengathu Bhoomiyilae	Vairasilai	Tamil	
2013	Pottas Bomb	Santhosh's friend	Malayalam	
2015	Kumbasaaram	Ayisha	Malayalam	
2016	Malgudi Days	Swathy	Malayalam	
2016	Jalam	Seetha Lakshmi	Malayalam	
2016	Leela	CK Bindu	Malayalam	
2017	Velipadinte Pusthakam	Jayanthi	Malayalam	
2017	Crossroad	Devi	Malayalam	Segment : "Kaaval"
2017	Mullappoo Pottu	Doctor	Malayalam	Short film
2018	Sukhamano Daveede	Jancy teacher	Malayalam	
2018	Aickarakkonathe Bhishaguaranmaar	Herself	Malayalam	
2019	Pengalila	Dr. Radhalekshmi	Malayalam	
2019	Mask	Dr. Rasiya Beegum	Malayalam	
2019	The Better Half	Lover / Wife	Malayalam	Short film
2020	Utraan	Kamali	Tamil	
2020	Joshua	Annie	Malayalam	
2021	Live Telecast	Shenbagam	Tamil	Disney+ Hotstar Web series
2021	Home	Young Annammachi	Malayalam	Prime Video film
2022	Antakshari	Chitra	Malayalam	Sony Liv film
2022	Jana Gana Mana	Anitha Nair	Malayalam	
2022	12th Man	Annie	Malayalam	Disney+ Hotstar film
2022	Kaduva	Merin Joseph	Malayalam	
2022	Varaal	Vrinda	Malayalam	
2024	Karnika	Ammu Swaminathan	Malayalam	
2025	Rekhachithram	Asha Pathrose	Malayalam	
2026	Achappa's Album	Rishi's mother	Malayalam	
TBA	Aa Mukham	Meera	Malayalam	
TBA	Ram	TBA	Malayalam	

== Television ==
Serials

- Thaarattu (DD)
- Sthreejanmam (Surya TV)
- Umakkuyil (DD)
- Megham (Asianet)
- Swarnamayooram (Asianet) as Thankam
- Thulasidalam (Surya TV)
- Sahadharmini (Asianet)
- Kurukshethram (Amrita TV)
- Aakashadoothu (Surya TV)

Program

- Celebrity Kitchen Magic (Kairali TV) as Judge
- Nostalgia (Kairali TV) as Anchor
- Your Choice (Asianet) as Anchor
- Priyabhavam (Kairali TV) as Presenter
- Page 3 (Kappa TV)
- Sell Me the Answer as Participant
- Comedy Stars (Asianet)
- Red Carpet (Amrita TV) as Mentor
- Parayam Nedam (Amrita TV)
- Let's Rock N Roll (Zee Keralam)
- Flowers Oru Kodi (Flowers TV)
- Fastest Family First Season 2 (Asianet)

Endorsements

- Maruthua Panjajeeraka Gudam
- Nana
- Kerala Kaumudi
- Vanitha
- Cream Life
- Manorama
- KSFE
