= Thiruvisanallur Sivayoginathar Temple =

Shiva temple in Thanjavur district, Tamil Nadu, India

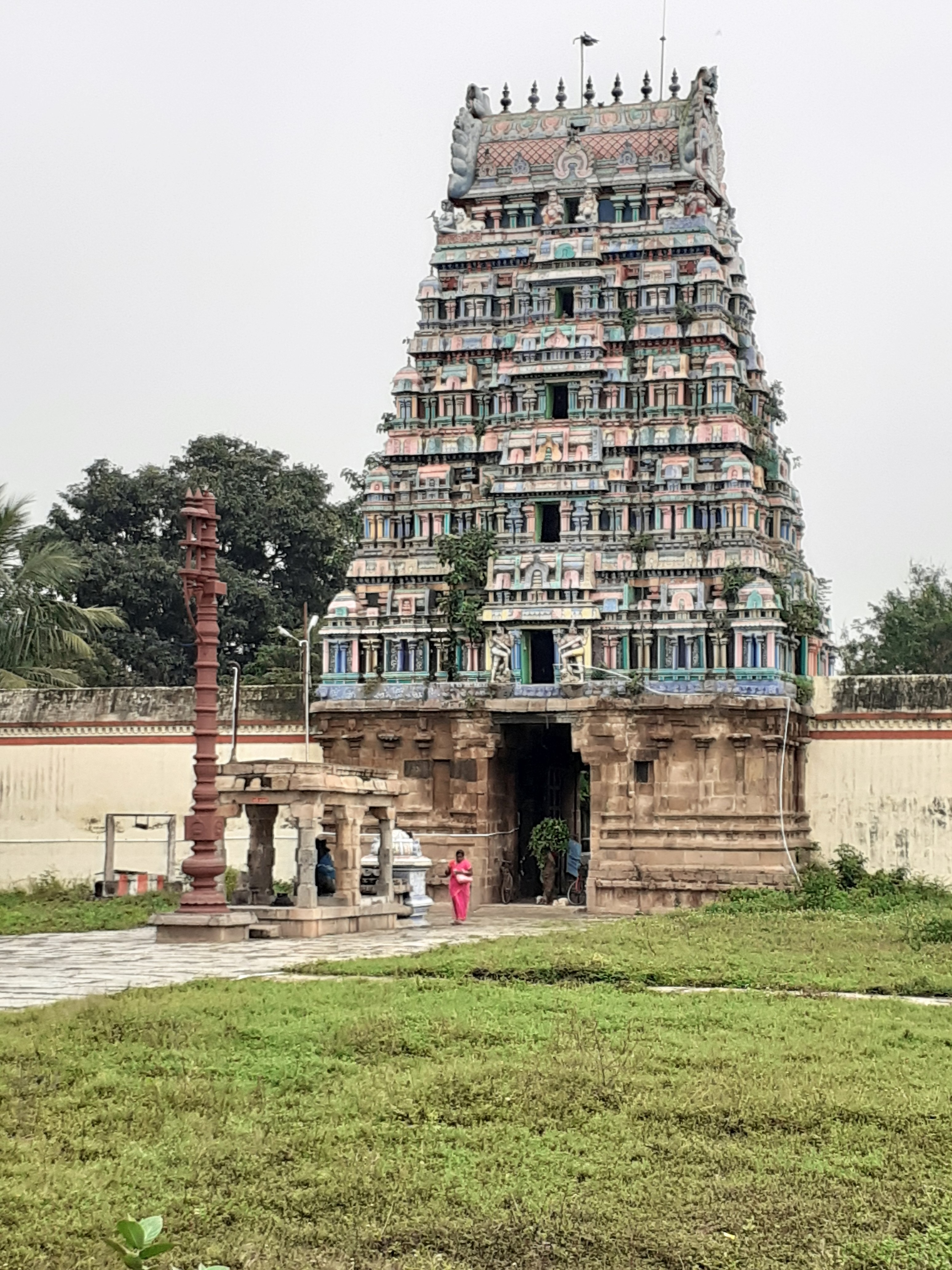

- Location in Tamil Nadu

Religion
- Affiliation: Hinduism
- District: Tanjore
- Deity: Sivayoganatha Swamy (Shiva), Soundaranayagi (Parvathi)
- Features: Tower: 05

Location
- Location: Thiruvisanallur, Tamil Nadu, India
- State: Tamil Nadu
- Country: India
- Coordinates: 11°0′N 79°27′E

Architecture
- Type: Tamil architecture
- Direction of façade: east

Sivayoginathar Temple also known as Yoganandeswarar temple is a Hindu temple to Shiva in Thiruvisanallur, Thanjavur district, Tamil Nadu, India. Shiva is represented by the lingam and his consort is Parvati. The presiding deity is revered in the 7th century Tamil Saiva canonical work, the Tevaram, and is therefore classified as Paadal Petra Sthalam.

There are many inscriptions associated with the temple indicating contributions from Pandyas Cholas, Thanjavur Nayaks and Thanjavur Marathas. The oldest parts of the present masonry structure were built during the Chola dynasty in the 9th century, while later expansions, are attributed to later periods, up to the Thanjavur Nayaks during the 16th century.

The temple house a five-tiered gateway tower known as gopurams.The temple is maintained and administered by Hindu Religious and Charitable Endowments Department of the Government of Tamil Nadu.

== Legend ==
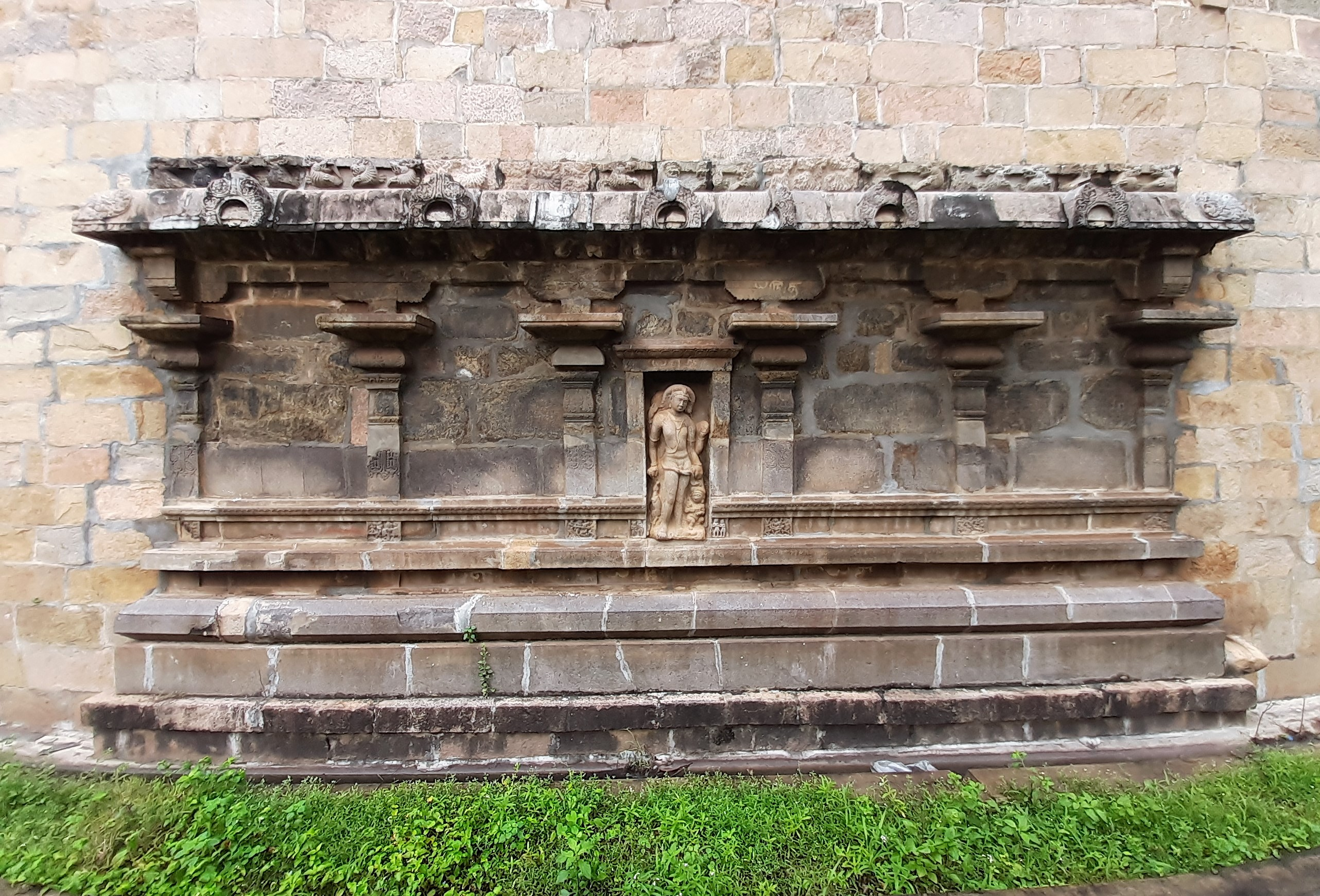
Panel on the second precinct showing Dakshinamurthy

As per Hindu legend, a king belonging to present day Kerala had illicit relation with lot of women. He also tortured and cheated many of them. At one stage, the king wanted to restore to a decent life and found a yogi who advised him to visit Thiruvisanallur. The king reached the place, had a dip in river Cauvery and worshipped Sivayoginathar to get rid of his curse. The legend leads to the belief that whoever incurs curse of women, gets curative visiting the temple. As per another legend, Nandi (the sacred bull of Shiva) got rid of Yama (Hindu god of death), who was approaching a worshipper of Shiva. This legend leads to the belief that a visit to the place is a curative to death related fears.

As per popular legend, a devotee who served in the temple of Tirumankalakkuti died there. He was brought back to life by the divine grace of Soundaranayagi. Brahma, who was born as the son of Vishnusarma, performed penance at this place along with his seven brothers and merged with the deity.

== Architecture ==
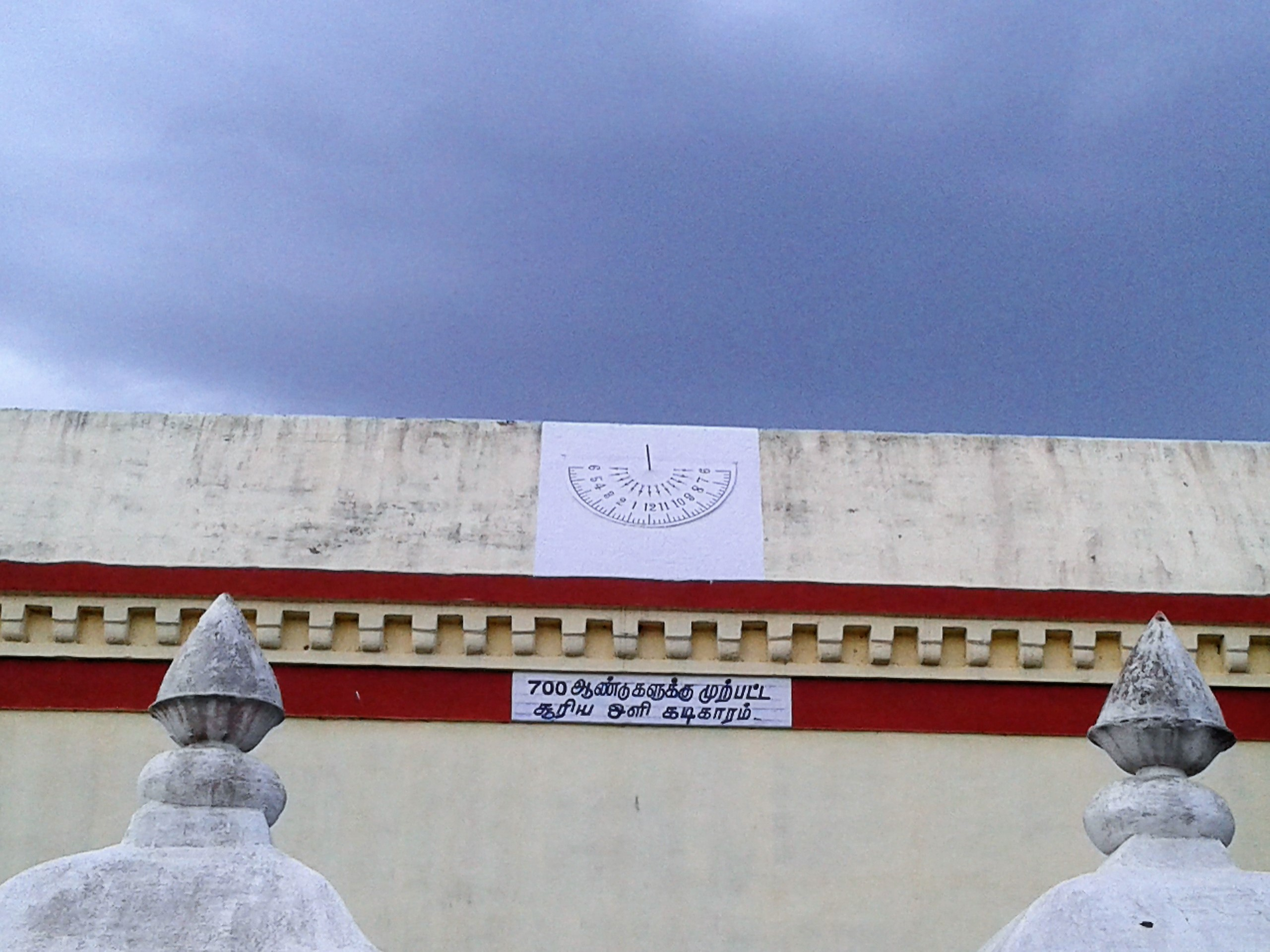
Image of the clock

Thiruvisanallur can be traced to the time of the Medieval Cholas having 97 inscriptions dating back to Parantaka I, Rajaraja Chola I and Rajendra Chola II. In modern times, the temple is now maintained and administered by Hindu Religious and Charitable Endowments Department of the Government of Tamil Nadu.

The Sivayoginathar Temple is believed to be built at the spot where eight Siva yogis attained salvation and merged with the lingam. The shrine is dedicated to Chatur Kala Bhairava, one of the four Bhairavas. The temple has a 5 tier rajagopuram with a large temple complex. The temple was erected during the Parantaka I reign 907-955 A.D. The sanctum is akin to Vaprabandha type with Arthapadma, a feature not mentioned in Vastu Shastra texts. The beautiful large vyalas in the prathimukha are among the most powerfully conceived of their kind. It is of modest proportions and consists of the sanctuary and its attached mandapam(hall). The two cover a total length of 15.3m, with its vimana measuring about 15.3 m. The mandapam is a hall of 4 central pillars, and a vestibule provided at its back, leading to the sanctum, which is a square chamber of 3.7 m. The lion motif is absent in the pillars though it reappeared in friezes where ever suited. The pillars in the interior are typical of Chola art. The usual deities are enshrined in the central niches outside the wall of the sanctum. The toranas over the south and west niches are of good workmanship, especially that on the west, which is perhaps the finest in South India.

== Literary mention ==
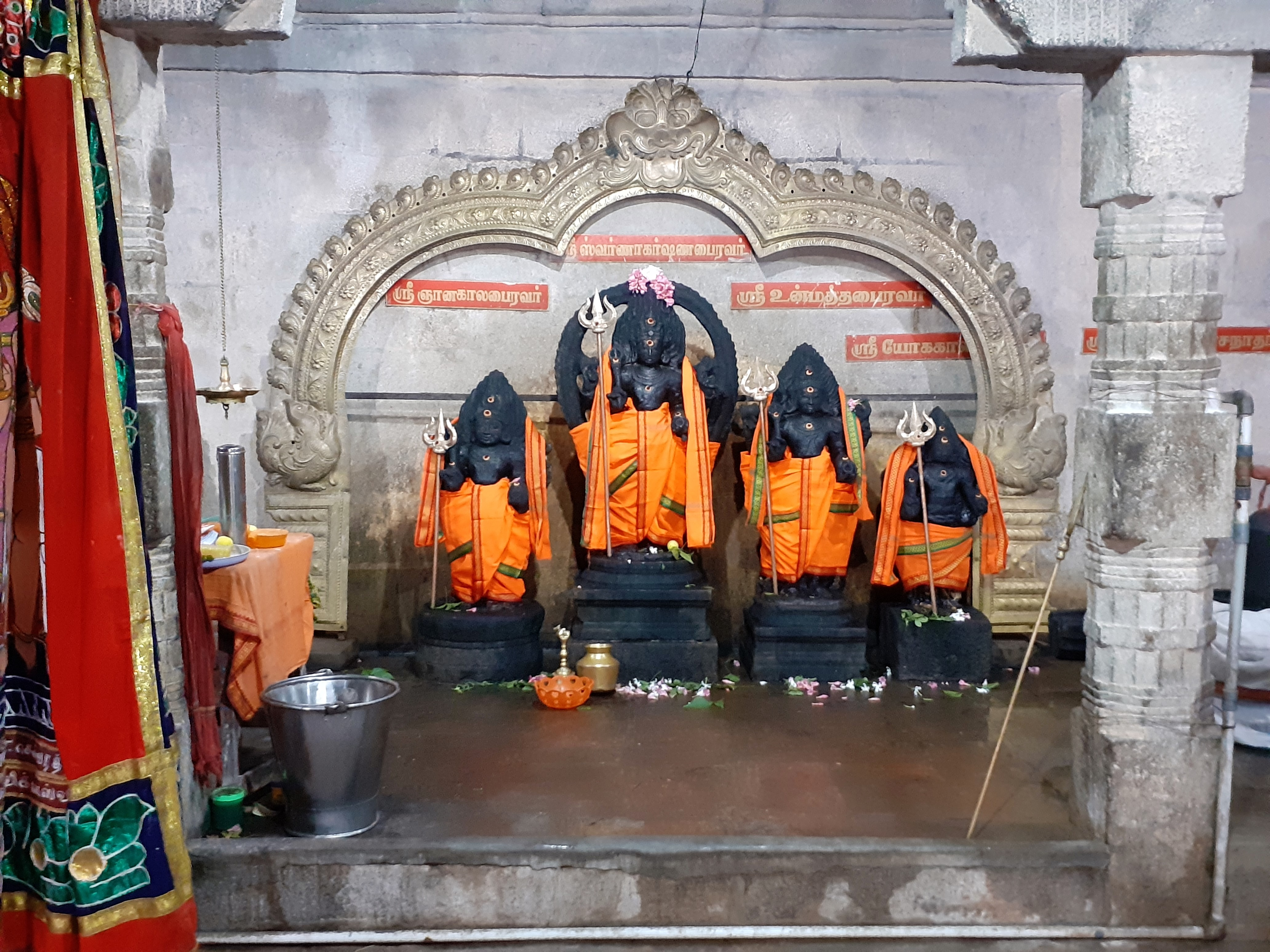
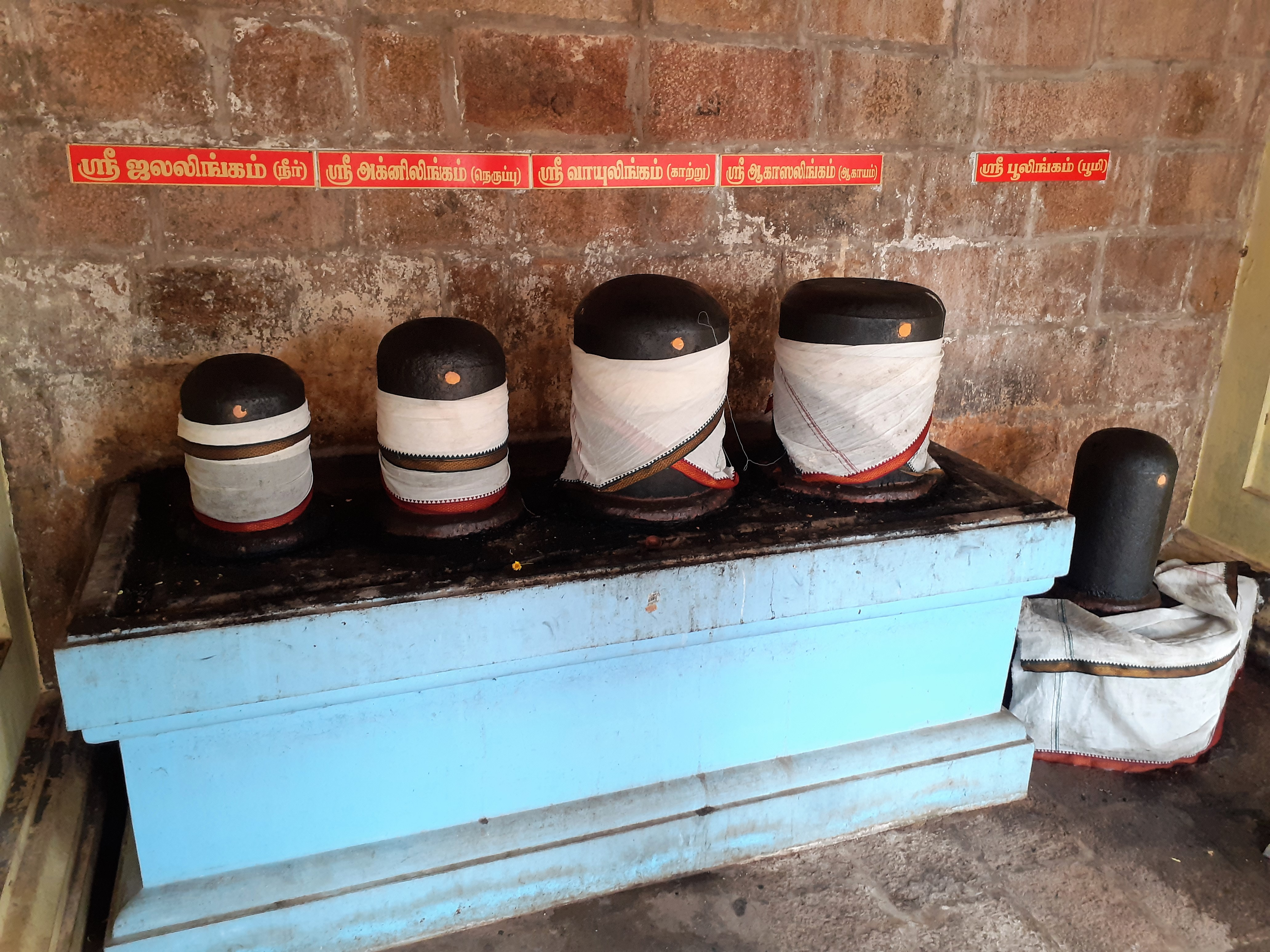
Images of shrines of the temple

The temple is mentioned in the verses of Tevaram, the 7th century Saivite canonical work, and therefore is Paadal Petra Sthalam, one of the 276 temples in the Saiva canon. The temple is on the northern bank of the River Kaveri.

== Palace Devasthanam ==
Thanjavur Palace Devasthanam comprises 88 temples, of which this temple is the one. They are combined and maintained share administrated with Hindu Religious and Charitable Endowments Department of the Government of Tamil Nadu.
