= Nerur (Tamil Nadu) =

Nerur is one of the villages in Karur taluk in Karur District in Tamil Nadu State. Nerur is located 10 km distance from Karur. It is 323 km far from Chennai. This village is known for the Samadhi of a 17th-century Hindu saint, Sri Sadasiva Brahmendra.
