= Vilapangalkkappuram =

- Directed by: T. V. Chandran
- Screenplay by: T. V. Chandran
- Story by: Aryadan Shoukath
- Produced by: Aryadan Shoukath
- Starring: Biju Menon; Priyanka Nair; Sudheesh; Suhasini
- Cinematography: M. J. Radhakrishnan
- Edited by: Beena Paul
- Music by: M. Jayachandran
- Release dates: December 2008 (IFFK); 12 June 2009
- Country: India
- Language: Malayalam

Vilapangalkkappuram (Beyond the Wail) is a 2008 Indian Malayalam-language film scripted and directed by T. V. Chandran in 2008. The film is based on the aftermath of the 2002 Gujarat riots of 2002. It was the second movie in the trilogy based on the riots by the director with the first one being Kadhavaseshan and the third and final one being Bhoomiyude Avakashikal. The main female lead Priyanka Nair won the Kerala State Film Award for Best Actress for her performance in this film.

== Plot ==
Zahira (Priyanka) lives happily with her parents and younger sister in Ahmedabad, until a group of communalists wreaks havoc. After being gang raped, she barely manages to escape from the criminals before they set her ablaze. In a fit of panic, she hides inside a lorry but it takes Zahira to her father's home-town in Kozhikode, Kerala.

As Zahira gradually recovers from her pathetic state, with the help of Dr. Mary Varghese (Suhasini) and Dr. Gopinath (Biju Menon), she has to face a new crisis. She soon realizes that in our society, most humans categorize themselves only on the basis of religions and castes.

Zahira learns more about the real world, where beastly minds are vying to pounce upon a helpless woman. Even during those tumultuous times, she comes across genuine souls like Gopalettan (Thilakan), who takes care of her like a daughter.

== Cast ==
- Priyanka Nair as Zahira
- Biju Menon as Dr. Gopinath
- Suhasini Maniratnam as Dr. Mary Varghese
- M. R. Gopakumar as Yusuf Ali (Zahira's father)
- V. K. Sreeraman as Salim Bhai
- Sudheesh as Khadar Kutty
- Thilakan as Gopalan
- Indrans
- Irshad
- Nandu
- Kozhikode Narayanan Nair
- Nilambur Ayisha
- Kozhikode Shantha Devi
- Praveena
- Zeenath

== Soundtrack ==
- "Mullulla Murikkinmel" - Manjari, M. Jayachandran (lyrics: Gireesh Pithenchery)

== Awards ==
- Kerala State Film Awards
  - Kerala State Film Award for Best Actress : Priyanka Nair
  - Kerala State Film Award for Best Story: Aryadan Shoukat
  - Kerala State Film Award for Best Female Singer: Manjari
  - Kerala State Film Award for Best Costume Designer: Kumar Edappal
