= Bharathchandran I.P.S. =

2005 film by Renji Panicker

Bharathchandran I.P.S
- VCD cover
- Directed by: Renji Panicker
- Written by: Renji Panicker
- Produced by: Renji Panicker
- Starring: Suresh Gopi; Sai Kumar; Rajan P. Dev; Lalu Alex
- Cinematography: Sanjeev Shankar
- Edited by: P. C. Mohanan
- Music by: Rajamani
- Production company: Voice Thoughts
- Distributed by: Lal Release
- Release date: 4 August 2005 (India)
- Running time: 125 minutes
- Country: India
- Language: Malayalam

Bharathchandran I.P.S is a 2005 Indian Malayalam-language action drama film written, directed and produced by Renji Panicker. It is a sequel to the 1994 film Commissioner and Suresh Gopi reprises the titular character, while Sai Kumar, Rajan P. Dev, Mamukkoya, Shreya Reddy and Lalu Alex appear in supporting roles. The background score was composed by C. Rajamani.

Bharathchandran I.P.S became the major highest-grossing film at that time.

== Plot ==
After killing Mohan Thomas to avenge his colleague Muhammad Iqbal's death. (Note: As depicted in Commissioner) Bharathchandran gets acquitted from suspension and gets married with his girlfriend Indu and leads a happy life. However, Indu is murdered by Mohan Thomas's goons and Bharathchandran decide to raises his 10-year-old daughter who is amusingly named as Indu .

Mayambaram Baba is an iconic Muslim leader in Malabar who gets murdered by a hired assassin named Kala Purohit Khan amidst tight security in the premises of a special court in Mangalore, where he was supposed to give evidence about the foul play behind an earlier communal riots by Janab Hyderali Hassan, who runs a crime syndicate. Hyderali felt that their existence would be questioned if Baba reveals the truths about the communal riots incited by them. As a matter of fact, the communal riots following Baba's murder are triggered and intensified by Hyderali to throw the region into a state of chaos.

Hyderali has other sinister motives like having the huge amount of land left behind by the fleeing population to himself for building a private sea port through which he hopes to pump illicit counterfeit money, drug trade and smuggling arms into the state. The state's CM Thomas Chacko entrusts the investigation of Mayambaram Baba's murder to Bharathchandran. Bharathchandran, along with officers ACP Anwar and DYSP Pookkoya report to IG Habib Basheer, who is entrusted as a guardian to Bharathchandran after the death of Bharathchandran's former mentor and I.G Balachandran. Bharathchandran works his way into the hierarchy of Hyderali's syndicate, starting with Shweta Nachappa, a Karnataka cop, who was on duty on the day of Baba's murder and actually seemed to know that he would be murdered earlier.

Hyderali kills Shweta after he finds that Bharathchandran is trailing her. It is later revealed that Thomas Chacko is also in cahoots with Hyderali. Habib Basheer is killed while trying to save Bharathchandran from Kala Purohit's gang. Enraged, Bharatchandran confronts Hyderali and also brings the captured Kala Purohit, with Anwar and Pookkoya's help. Bharathchandran gives an empty revolver to Kala Purohit and asks him to shoot Hyderali. Kala tries to shoot Bharathchandran, but is later killed by him. Bharathchandran soon kills Hyderali in front of a frightened Thomas Chacko.

== Cast ==
- Suresh Gopi as DIG Bharath Chandran IPS, City Police Commissioner
- Lalu Alex as IG Habeeb Basheer IPS
- Sai Kumar as Janab Hyderali Hassan
- Rajan P. Dev as DYSP Pookkoya
- Shreya Reddy as SP Hema Viswanath IPS
- Madhu Warrier as ACP Anwar IPS
- Vijayaraghavan as Thomas Chacko, Chief Minister of Kerala
- Akhila as Swetha Nachappa IPS
- Mamukkoya as Kunjeeswaran Pillai
- Niranjana as Indulekha, Bharathchandran's Daughter
- Prabha Dutt as Jasmine Mary Cherian
- Akhila as Swetha Nachappa IPS
- Urmila Unni as Subhadra, Habeeb's Wife
- Nivia Rebin as Habeeb's Daughter
- Kundara Johny as IG Rajan Koshy IPS
- Subair as MLA Mayin Kutty
- Ajay Rathnam as Kala Purohit Khan
- Kollam Ajith as Udayan Shetty
- V. K. Sreeraman as Mayamparam Baba
- Kozhikode Narayanan Nair as Shekharji, Chief Minister's P. A
- Ravindran as Devan Menon, Customs Officer
- T. P. Madhavan as Vakkalam Moosa (Minister)
- Balachandran Chullikkadu as Mundoor Sidhan
- Meghna Nair as Lekha, Journalist
- Priyanka as Susheela
- Santhakumari
- Ratheesh as Mohan Thomas (Mentioned Only)
- Shobhana as Indu Kurup, Bharathchandran's Wife (Photo Presence)
- Maniyanpilla Raju as Constable Gopinathan / Gopi (Mentioned Only)
- M. G. Soman as I. G. Balachandran Nair (Mentioned Only)

== Box office ==
The film collected ₹2.5 crore in distributor's share from 50 screens on the 7th day.
