= Veyil (2006 film) =

- Theatrical release poster
- Directed by: G. Vasanthabalan
- Written by: G. Vasanthabalan
- Produced by: S. Shankar
- Starring: Bharath; Pasupathy; Bhavana; Sriya Reddy; Priyanka
- Cinematography: R. Madhi
- Edited by: Mathan Gunadeva
- Music by: G. V. Prakash Kumar
- Production company: S Pictures
- Release date: 8 December 2006
- Country: India
- Language: Tamil

Veyil (transl. Sunshine) is a 2006 Indian Tamil-language crime drama film written and directed by G. Vasanthabalan. The film stars Bharath, Pasupathy, Bhavana, Sriya Reddy and Priyanka. The music was composed by G. V. Prakash Kumar with cinematography by R. Madhi and editing by Mathan Gunadeva.

Veyil was released on 8 December 2006 and was a commercial success. It is the first Tamil film screened at Cannes as part of the 2007 Cannes Film Festival in the 'Tous les Cinemas du Monde' section. The film was remade in Bangladeshi Bengali as Antor Jala (2017).

== Plot ==
Sivanandi Thevar is a butcher who works hard to raise his four children (two sons and two daughters) and has a happy family. Sivanandi's sons are Murugesan and Kathir, and Murugesan dotes on his younger brother Kathir. Murugesan's enjoyment is films (especially those of MGR) that are screened at a local theatre. One day, Murugesan's life changes when his father catches him watching a film in the theatre and smoking a cigarette. Murugesan is severely punished and runs away from home, stealing his family's money and jewels.

Along the way, Murugesan gets sidetracked from his intended destination of Chennai by an MGR movie poster. He is shown watching several MGR shows, buying a change of clothes, and eating a hearty meal with his ill-gotten money. After spending the night at the local temple, he wakes up to find his money and other possessions stolen. Murugesan is then taken under the wings of a theatre projectionist in a nearby town. Slowly, the theatre becomes his home.

As adults, Murugesan and Kathir fall in love with Thangam and Meenakshi, respectively. Thangam is a beautiful girl who lives opposite the theatre, and Meenakshi is an innocent girl. Kathir starts an advertising agency but faces opposition from Bose and Annachi, the local gangsters.

Murugesan's love ends in Thangam's suicide because her father and his relatives beat up and hang Murugesan as they are trying to kill him due to their dislike of him. At that moment, Thangam shows up with a knife and threatens to kill herself if they do not release Murugesan; when they do not release him, she slits her throat and dies. Murugesan is heartbroken and is released upon Thangam's death. He begins to drink heavily. Sometime later, the theatre is demolished, the owner citing loss of business.

Murugesan decides to return home after 20 years. The rest of the film follows Murugesan's mental turmoil as he is caught between the deep love showered by Kathir, his guilt over not being a responsible son or elder brother, and his remorse for his parents. Then there is Paandi, Murugesan's childhood sweetheart.

Bose, fearing Kathir will be a challenge to his advertising company, ruins Kathir's agency with Annachi's help. Kathir retaliates by trying to kill Bose, but gets stopped by Murugesan. One day, jewels go missing in Murugesan's family's house. Murugesan's father suspects Murugesan of being the thief and insults the latter in front of everyone, when their daughter arrives and tells her father that she took them. After an emotional conversation with his father, Murugesan decides to leave his family home.

Kathir learns of this and goes to the bus station to bring Murugesan back, but there, Bose's and Annachi's men stab Kathir. In retaliation, Murugesan beats a few thugs. Kathir is rushed to a hospital in a critical condition. That night, Murugesan decides to avenge his brother's injury. He goes to Annachi's place, engages in a duel with him, and becomes unconscious. Bose arrives there with his men and tells him that his brother is dead. Believing this, Murugesan kills Bose and the latter's men. However, Murugesan is stabbed by Bose in the fight and dies, while Kathir becomes stable and recovers in the hospital. The next day, all mourn Murugesan's death, and his father is filled with remorse for not having trusted his son when he was alive.

== Cast ==
- Bharath as Kathir
- Pasupathy as Murugesan
- Bhavana as Meenakshi
- Sriya Reddy as Paandiyamma
- Priyanka Nair as Thangam
- Ravi Mariya as Bose
- G. M. Kumar as Sivanandi Thevar
- T. K. Kala
- Bombay Gnanam
- Periya Karuppu Thevar
- Kadhal Sukumar
- Kottachi
- R. S. G. Chelladurai
- Kirupa as Aachi

Uncredited

- Chaams as Meenakshi's brother
- Karate Venkatesan

== Production ==
Veyil is the first Tamil film to be shot in Virudhunagar. Director and writer Vasanthabalan said that after he wrote the story, S. Shankar was impressed and asked him to expand it into a screenplay. Sandhya was supposed to play the female lead but was replaced by Bhavana. Vasanthabalan cast Sriya Reddy after being impressed with her performance in the 2004 Malayalam film Black.

== Soundtrack ==
The soundtrack was composed by debutant G. V. Prakash Kumar, the nephew of A. R. Rahman. The soundtrack received a positive review from Shyam Balasubramanian of Rediff.com.

Track listing
No.	Title	Lyrics	Singer(s)	Length
1.	"Veyilodu Vilaiyadi"	Na. Muthukumar	Tippu, Jassie Gift, Kailash Kher, V. V. Prasanna
2.	"Kaadhal Neruppin"	Na. Muthukumar	Karthik, Chinmayi, Nidheesh Gopalan
3.	"Urugudhe Maragudhe"	Na. Muthukumar	Shankar Mahadevan, Shreya Ghoshal
4.	"Sethavadam"	Ekadasi	Manikka Vinayagam
5.	"Iraivanai Unargira"	Na. Muthukumar	Prashanthini
6.	"Ooran Thotathhilae"	Na. Muthukumar	Palakkad Sreeram, Rakesh
7.	"Aruva Minuminuga"	Karisal Karunanidhi	Karisal Karunanidhi, Kottaisami, Madurai Chandran, Jayapal, Azhaguthai, Thillai Panneer
8.	"Kaatraaga Kadhal"	Na. Muthukumar	Rahul Nambiar

== Critical reception ==
Shwetha Bhaskar of Rediff.com wrote, "Director Vasantha Balan has deftly handled the script, making it his own. By maintaining an energetic pace throughout, he ensures the story doesn't become monotonous or conventional, despite the somewhat predictable plot. His characters are distinctly human with myriad personality flaws, so that the audience can identify with them". Sify wrote, "Once again Shankar has introduced Vasantha Balan a director who understands the nuances of making a realistic film with well-etched out characters and strong screenplay." Lajjavathi of Kalki praised the performances of star cast, Prakash Kumar's music, Madhi's cinematography while also praising for conveying emotions through visuals by lessening dialogues and concluded saying the cinema which used to portray only winners in life has first time portrayed a life of a loser, even that sadness feels good.

== Festivals ==
- Cannes International Film Festival 2007 – Screened under Tous les Cinemas du Monde
- Shanghai International Film Festival 2007 – Nominee under Asian New Talent Award
- Habitat International Film Festival 2007 – Screened
- Pune International Film Festival 2007 – Screened under Indian Bioscope

== Accolades ==
- National Film Award for Best Feature Film in Tamil – 2006
- Elemec's 3rd Amrita Film Awards — Won Best Other Language Film
- Filmfare Award for Best Tamil Film – S. Shankar
- Filmfare Award for Best Tamil Director – Vasanthabalan
- Tamil Nadu State Film Award for Best Film – 2006
