= Sri Sridhara Ayyaval Mutt =

Hindu monastery in Thiruvisanallur, India

The Sri Sridhara Ayyaval Mutt is a Hindu mutt in the village of Thiruvisanallur. The mutt was established by a Saivite saint Sridhara Venkatesa Ayyaval who lived and preached here in the late 17th century. The main duties of the mutt are to perpetuate the memory of Sridhara Ayyaval. The mutt also organizes philanthropic activities and holds pujas during major Hindu festivals.

The mutts in Tamil Nadu started for the purpose of developing Hinduism and serving the public. More are less than they are performing the welfare activities in the society. Constructing a temple in Tamil Nadu (by stone) is so expensive. Likewise maintaining the old temple showing the ancient Tamil Nadu culture and style is also expensive. The mutts are partially taking the service.

The following Navagraha temples are situated in the districts of Thanjavur, Nagapattinam, Thiruvarur, and Puducheri territory. But the Kumbakonam town is surrounded by all the Navagrasthalam. So we can take trip from Kumbakonam.

SL.No	Name of village	Navagraha Temple	Phone Number	Nearby town	Kilometers
1	Suriyanar koil	Temple of Sun	0435-2472349	Kumbakonam	15
2	Thingaloore	Temple of Moon	–	Thanjavur	14
3	Vaitheeswaran koil	Temple of Mars	04364-279423	Mailaduthurai	13
4	Thiruvenkadu	Temple of Mercury	04364-256424	Mailaduthurai	25
5	Alangudi	Temple of Jupiter	04374-269407	Kumbakonam	15
6	Kanjanur	Temple of Venus	0435-2473737	Kumbakonam	21
7	Thirunallar	Temple of Saturn	04368-236530	Karaikkal	05
8	Thirunageswaram	Temple of Raghu	0435-2463354	Kumbakonam	17
9	Keezha Perumpallam	Temple of Kedhu	04364-275222	Mailaduthurai	33
