= Thiruvisanallur =

Village in Tamil Nadu, India

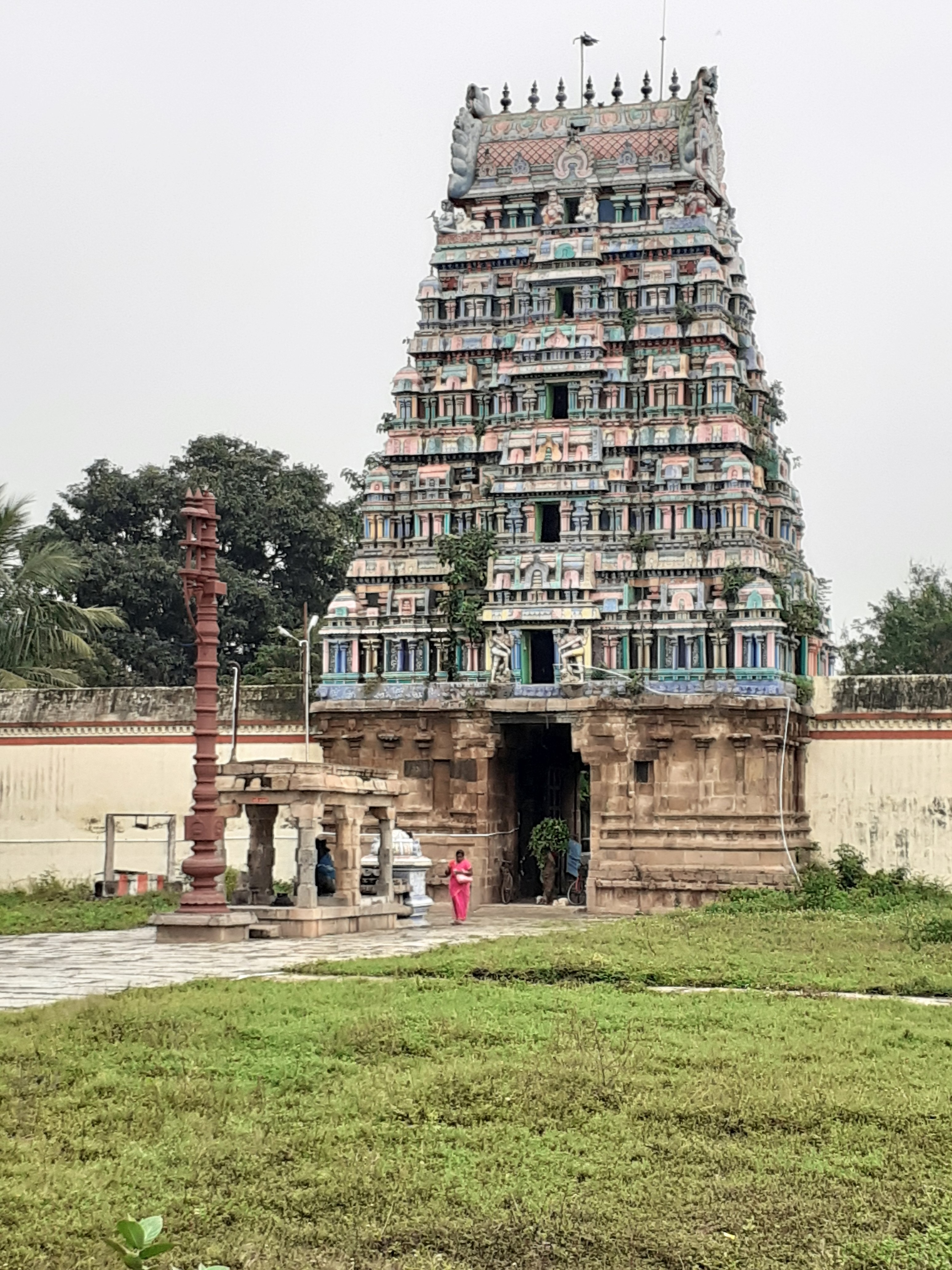
A view of the Sivayoginathar Temple from the entrance

Thiruvisanallur also called Thiruvisalur (formerly known as Shahajirajapuram) is a village in the Thanjavur district of Tamil Nadu. The village is known for the Sivayoginathar Temple, a Hindu Temple dedicated to Lord Siva. The Tirundudevankudi Karkadeswarar Temple is located nearby.

The history of Thiruvisanallur can be traced back to the time of the Medieval Cholas, who established the village as Vembarur or Solamarthanda Chaturvedimangalam. There are inscriptions dating back to the time of Raja Raja Chola I.

The Thanjavur Maratha king Shahuji I endowed Thiruvisanallur to forty-six Brahmins as a brahmadeya in the year 1695. Following this endowment, the name of the village was changed to Shahajirajapuram. At about this time, a Hindu saint by name Sridhara Venkatesa Ayyaval a companion of the Shankaracharya Bodhendra Saraswathi, settled in Thiruvisanallur and founded the Sri Sridhara Ayyaval Mutt.

== Sivayoginathar Temple & Clock ==
The Sivayoginathar Temple is old and is believed to be built at the spot where eight Siva yogis(sages) attained salvation and merged with the lingam. The shrine is dedicated to Chatur Kala Bhairavar, one of the four Bhairavas. The Sthala Vriksha(temple tree) of the temple is vilva. The temple is frequented by people who were born under the zodiac sign Vrishabha.

A 1,400-year-old sun clock mounted on the 35-feet-high inner wall, built during Parantaka Cholan’s rule does not require battery or electricity. Carved out of granite and shaped like a semi-circle, it has is a three inch-long brass needle permanently fixed at the center of a horizontal line. As the sun casts its rays on the needle, the shadow of the needle indicates the right time.

Tiruvasanallur is most famous for the Karkateswarar temple, the village deity of Tiruvisanallur, as well as for the notable figure Sridhar Ayyaval Mutt.
