= Prasanna Venkateswara Temple, Appalayagunta =

Hindu temple in India

Sri Prasanna Venkateswara Swamy Temple, Tirupati
- శ్రీ ప్రసన్న వేంకటేశ్వరస్వామి వారి ఆలయం
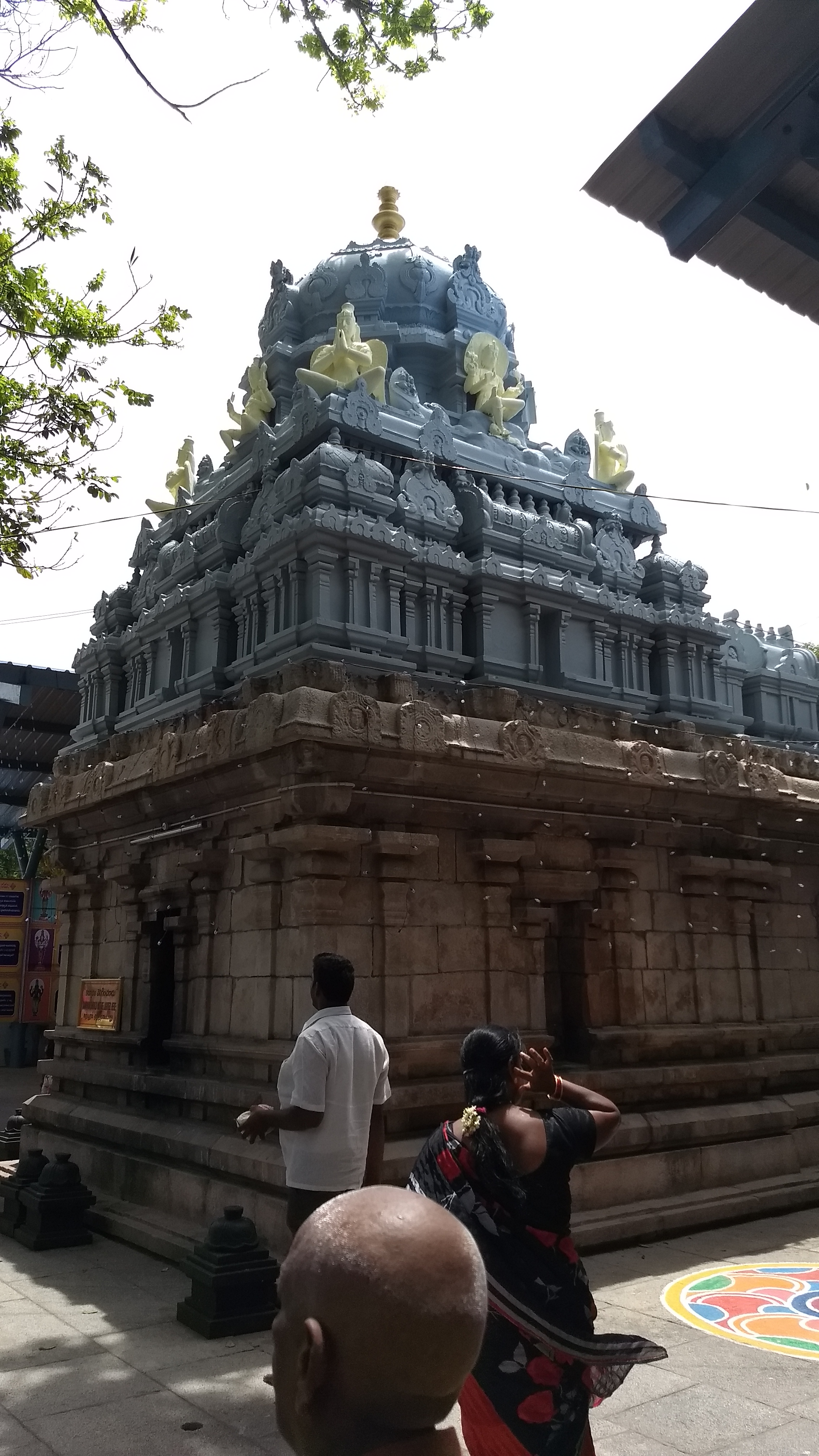

- Location in Andhra Pradesh

Religion
- Affiliation: Hinduism
- District: Tirupati
- Deity: Venkateswara, Padmavati
- Festivals: Brahmotsavams, Vaikuntha Ekadasi
- Governing body: Tirumala Tirupati Devasthanams

Location
- Location: Tirupati
- State: Andhra Pradesh
- Country: India
- Interactive map of Sri Prasanna Venkateswara Swamy Temple, Tirupati
- Coordinates: 13°32′14.7″N 79°28′39.4″E

Architecture
- Type: Dravidian architecture
- Completed: 1232 AD
- Temple: 4

Website
- tirumala.org

Sri Prasanna Venkateswara Swamy Temple is a temple at Appalayagunta, Tirupati located in Tirupati district of Andhra Pradesh, India. The temple is dedicated to the Hindu deity Venkateswara, referred to as Prasanna Venkateswara. Unlike other typical Venkateswara temples, the presiding deity has its right hand in Abhaya posture.

== History ==
The temple was constructed in 1232 AD by King of Karvetinagaram, Venkata Perumalaraju Brahmadeva.

== Administration ==
The temple has been managed by Tirumala Tirupati Devasthanams since 1988.

== See also ==
- Hindu Temples in Tirupati
- List of Temples under Tirumala Tirupati Devasthanams(TTD)
