= Black (2004 film) =

- DVD poster
- Directed by: Ranjith
- Written by: Ranjith
- Produced by: Lal
- Starring: Mammootty; Lal; Mohan Jose; Rahman; Babu Antony; Sriya Reddy; Janardanan
- Cinematography: Amal Neerad
- Edited by: L. Bhoominathan
- Music by: Songs: Alex Paul; Score: C. Rajamani
- Production company: Lal Creations
- Distributed by: Lal Release
- Release date: 10 November 2004
- Country: India
- Language: Malayalam

Black is a 2004 Indian Malayalam language neo-noir gangster drama film written and directed by Ranjith, and produced by Lal. Set in the brutal underworld of Kochi City it follows police Head constable Karaikkamuri Shanmughan who is an infamous hitman and enforcer. The film features cinematography by Amal Neerad. The film was a comeback for actor Rahman to Malayalam cinema. The film was released on 12 November on the occasion of Diwali.

== Plot ==
Adv. Devin Carlos Padaveedan, runs an organized crime syndicate in Kochi. Shanmughan alias "Kumbari" is a feared hitman and Padaveedan's business partner, who moonlights as a police constable, but wears his uniform only on January 26 (Republic Day) and on August 15 (Independence Day). Ashok Sreenivas is the new SI in Kasaba Police Station (Shanmughan's station) whose aim is to get rid of organized crime from Cochin. Ashok's elder brother (Who was rendered paralysed below the waist by Shanmughan) is requested by him to take care of Ashok. Partly out of regret and liking for Ashok Shanmughan agrees.

Ashok catches hold of one of Padaveedan's gang members and is kept at a secret location to reveal the gang's further whereabouts. Shanmughan warns Ashok about such a move will only attract more violence directed at him but Ashok is adamant. Shanmughan tries to reach where Ashok is to save him from the wrath of Padaveedan but is too late. The captive gang member lures Ashok into Padaveedan's lair and ambushes him. Ashok puts up a fight but is heavily outnumbered. Padaveedan brutally stabs Ashok to death by the time Shanmughan reaches the spot.

A local innocent Tamil laundryman is arrested for Ashok's murder and interrogated in jail. His hapless wife Anandam approaches Shanmughan to help release him. The interrogation methods prove too much which the laundryman is unable to withstand and dies due to the torture. The laundryman's custodial death is then portrayed as a custodial suicide by the cops. The subsequent incidents cause Shanmughan to go through a period of remorse with Ashok's death and also when he realizes a deaf and mute girl handed over to him by one of the respected political veterans is actually fathered by him. Shanmughan gives a piece of mind to the commissioner for letting the laundryman die and decides to leave his life of crime behind him. Padaveedan's gang member, Papalli Pappali Sabu has been eyeing Anandam for sexual favors for quite a while and when he becomes persistent in his efforts, Shanmughan intervenes and warns other gang members to stay away from her and also declares he will punish Sabu for his insolence.

Sabu is eventually killed by another gang when he is flung off a building while he is on his extortion rounds. The gang members complain to Padaveedan about Shanmughan's warning and also expresses doubts that Shanmughan's hand and connivance with the gang that threw Sabu from the building. Padaveedan suspects Shanmughan, because of his interaction with Ashok and his new found family. Padaveedan turns against Shanmughan and orders his lieutenants to finish him. Shanmughan still can't believe his betrayal, but eventually is sure about it when his daughter and Anandam are attacked by Padaveedan's men and is rescued in nick of time by two small time crooks .

Shanmughan has had enough when Padaveedan imports the trained killers from Tamil Nadu to finish off Shanmughan but he kills them all. He meets the commissioner and reveals he is going on a mission to finish Padaveedan's gang one by one. The commissioner tries to object by saying that the government hasn't given the police permission to do so. But, Shanmughan tells him to get lost and sets out on his mission.

Shanmughan then dismantles his syndicate by killing every member of the gang and finally sneaks into Padaveedan's home in full uniform while the commissioner and a battalion of police are guarding the place and kills him by slitting his throat. In the end, Shanmughan moves out to start a new life with his deaf daughter and Anandam.

== Cast ==
- Mammootty as HC Karaikkamuri Shanmughan (Kumbari)
- Lal as Adv. Devin Carlos Padaveedan "Padaveedan Vakkeel"
- Rahman as SI Ashok Srinivas
- Babu Antony as City Police Commissioner Govind Chengappa IPS
- Sriya Reddy as Anandam
- Mohan Jose as Mammali
- Janardhanan as Aashan, Communist Party District Secretary
- Janaki Krishnan as Anna
- Tom George Kolath as Ajay Srinivas
- Kulappully Leela as Veronica
- Sona Nair as Sheela
- T. P. Madhavan as Babu Mathew, a Businessman
- Prem Kumar as Unni
- Sadiq as Mustafa
- Ramu as K. E. Francis (Pranchi Manthri), Kerala State Minister of Fisheries and Tourism, and a close associate of Shanmughan and Padaveedan
- Niyas Musaliyar as Pappali Sabu
- Anoop Chandran as Pauly
- Kannan Pattambi as Auto Raju
- Daniel Balaji as Ezhumalai
- Joju George as Stephen, Ashok's friend
- Besant Ravi
- Meenakshi (Cameo appearance in the song Ambalakkara)

== Release ==
The film was released on 10 November 2004. Black opened with a record 50 prints had good opening day collection.

== Soundtrack ==
Music: Alex Paul
Lyrics: Ranjith, Kaithapram, Pirai Choodan

- "Ambalakkara" – M. G. Sreekumar, Chorus
- "Ambalakkara" (Extended) – M. G. Sreekumar
- "Thinkal Kalaye" – Sujatha Mohan
