= G. Vasanthabalan =

Indian film director and screenwriter

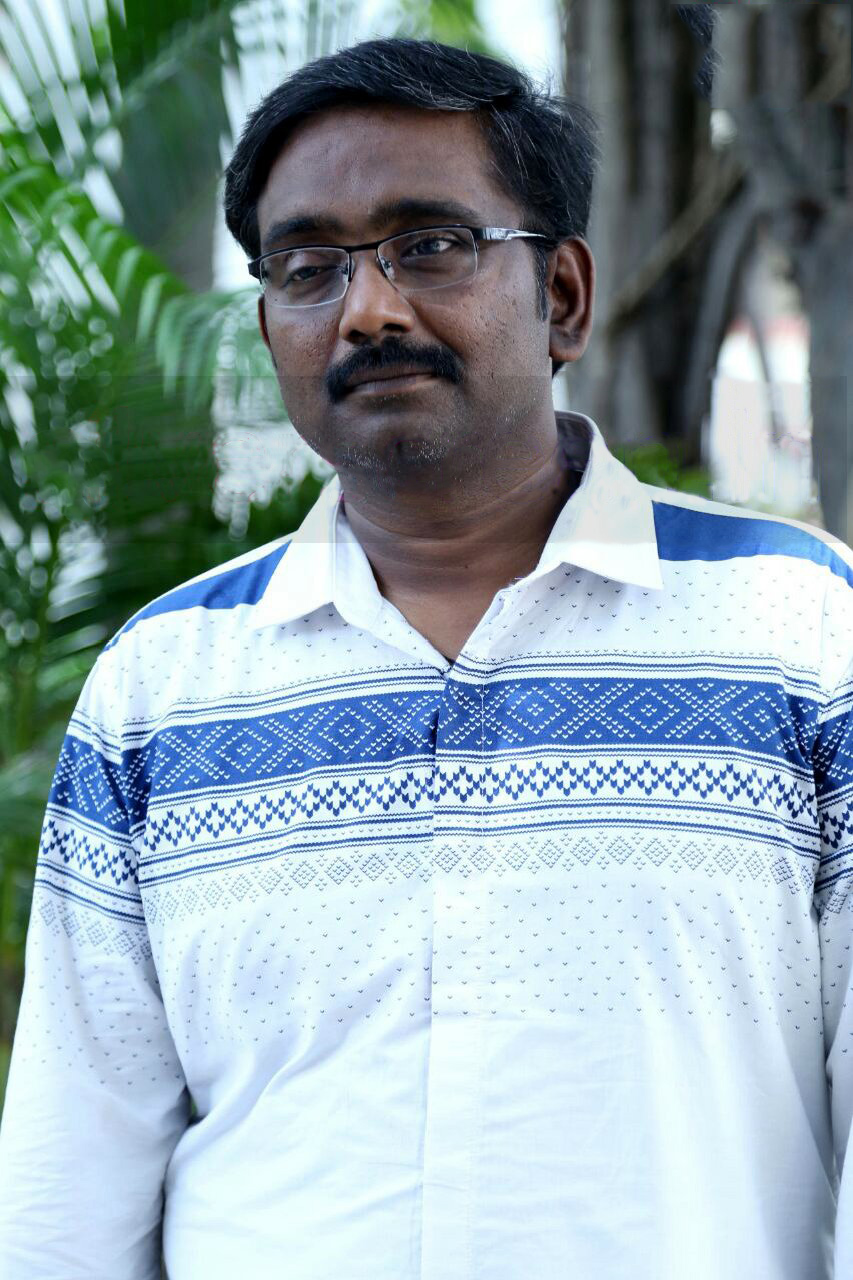
- Vasanthabalan in 2014
- Born: Devathanam, Rajapalayam, Tamil Nadu, India
- Occupations: Film director Screenwriter
- Years active: 2002 - present
- Website: https://www.directorvasanthabalan.com/

G. Vasanthabalan (credited as G. Vasanta Balan) is an Indian Tamil film director and screenwriter. He has made critically acclaimed films including Veyil (2006), Angadi Theru (2010) and Kaaviya Thalaivan (2014).

== Career ==
Vasanthabalan began his film career as an editing assistant and later became an assistant director to S.Shankar in the latter's directorial debut, Gentleman (1993). He continued to work under Shankar in three more films Kaadhalan (1994), Indian (1996) and Jeans (1998).

He later made his break as an independent director with the box-office failure Album (2002).

His second film, produced by Shankar's S Pictures, Veyil (2006) was both critically acclaimed and commercially successful. It was shown as the Indian representative at the 2007 Cannes Film Festival. His next release, Angadi Theru (2010), showcased a romantic tale set in the famous Ranganathan Street in the city of Chennai, Tamil Nadu. The film won critical acclaim and was a commercial success as well. It was shortlisted for India's submission for the Academy Award for Best Foreign Language Film. In 2012, he released Aravaan, a period film based on the novel Kaaval Kottam, that reflects the life of people of South Tamil Nadu in the 18th century. Following that, he made the period drama Kaaviya Thalaivan (2014), which won critical acclaim.

The crime drama Jail (2021) starring G. V. Prakash Kumar and Abarnathi in main roles, and the film didn't go well as expected. He later directed the psychological thriller film Aneethi starring Arjun Das and Dushara Vijayan in lead roles. Aneethi is an impressive and powerful take on exploitation, kindness and everything in between. In 2024, the political thriller streaming television series Thalaimai Seyalagam was released to average reviews.

== Filmography ==
Year	Film	Notes
2002	Album	
2006	Veyil	National Film Award for Best Feature Film in Tamil; Tamil Nadu State Film Award for Best Film; Filmfare Award for Best Director – Tamil
2010	Angaadi Theru	Vijay Award for Best Director; Filmfare Award for Best Director – Tamil; Tamil Nadu State Film Award for Best Director; Ananda Vikatan Cinema Award for Best Story
2012	Aravaan	
2014	Kaaviya Thalaivan	Norway Tamil Film Festival for Best Director
2021	Jail	
2023	Aneethi	
2024	Thalaimai Seyalagam	ZEE5 Original; Ananda Vikatan Cinema Award for Best Web Series

As an actor

- Jeans (1998) as Cashier in Pechiappan's Hotel
