= Devathanam =

Village in Rajapalayam Taluk, Virudhunagar district, Tamil Nadu, India

Devathanam Deiva vanam
- Village
- Location in Tamil Nadu, India Devathanam (India)
- Coordinates: 9.3860645°N 77.4630574°E
- Country: India
- State: Tamil Nadu
- District: Virudhunagar

Languages
  - Official: Tamil
- Time zone: UTC+5:30 (IST)

Devathanam is a neighbourhood Village of Rajapalayam in Virudhunagar district, Tamil Nadu, India.

The name is derived from Deiva vanam. It is 14 km (8.7 mi) from Rajapalayam on National Highway 208.

Devathanam Location has places to see Sastha Kovil, waterfalls, and water sources.

Sivan temple situated in this location name of Natchadai Thavirtharuliya swamy thirukkovil 2 km away from the devathanam location
